= 2004–05 FC Zürich season =

FC Zürich
2004–05 season
- Owner: FCZ AG
- Club president: Sven Hotz
- Head-coach: Lucien Favre
- Ground: Letzigrund
- 2004–05 Swiss Super League: 5th of 10
- 2004–05 Swiss Cup: Winners
- Top goalscorer: League: Alhassane Keita (11); All: Alhassane Keita (17)

The 2004–05 season was FC Zürich's 108th season in their existence, since their foundation in 1896. It was their fifteenth consecutive season in the top flight of Swiss football, following their promotion at the end of the 1989–90 season.

== Overview ==
In 1971, under the presidency of Edy Naegeli, FC Zürich established an operating company named FCZ AG, with an initial capital of one million Swiss francs. In doing so, the club broke into new grounds and became the first Swiss club to have a holding company. The operating company FCZ AG is responsible for all sporting activities, ranging from professional football to the "LetziKids" youth program and the FCZ women’s teams. The local businessman and property dealer Sven Hotz was the principal owner (majority shareholder) at this time. Hotz was the club's chairman and had taken over as club president at the AGM in 1986. The club's valid contract with previous season's head-coach Lucien Favre was extended before the season.

FCZ played their home games in the Letzigrund, a stadium also used by the athletics club LC Zürich. The stadium originally opened in 1925, was partially rebuilt in 1973 and was modernised during the mid-90's. The stadium is located in the west of Zurich in the district of Altstetten, which is about three kilometers from the city center.

The FCZ first team competed in this years domestic first-tier 2004–05 Swiss Super League with the clear intention of retaining their top level status and reaching one of the top three positions and so qualify for a UEFA European competition. The team also competed in 2004–05 Swiss Cup. The team had not qualified for any of the UEFA European tournaments and they had not applied to enter the 2004 UEFA Intertoto Cup.

== Players ==
The following is the list of the FCZ first team squad this season. It also includes players that were in the squad the day the domestic league season started, on 16 July 2003, but subsequently left the club after that date.

Note: Flags indicate national team as defined under FIFA eligibility rules; some limited exceptions apply. Players may hold more than one non-FIFA nationality.

No.	Pos.	Nation	Player
—	GK	SUI	Davide Taini (league games: 28)
—	GK	SUI	Johnny Leoni (league games: 8)
—	DF	SUI	Remo Buess (league games: 4)
—	DF	ARG	Diego Capria (league games: 11)
—	DF	ROU	Iulian Filipescu (league games: 21)
—	DF	SUI	Alain Nef (league games: 28)
—	DF	SUI	Giuseppe Rapisarda (league games: 3)
—	DF	SUI	Florian Stahel (league games: 21)
—	DF	SUI	Daniel Stucki (league games: 5)
—	MF	SUI	Almen Abdi (league games: 9)
—	MF	ARG	Sergio Bastida (league games: 1)
—	MF	BRA	César (league games: 10)
—	MF	SUI	Francesco Di Jorio (league games: 31)
—	MF	SUI	Blerim Džemaili (league games: 28)

No.	Pos.	Nation	Player
—	MF	SUI	Daniel Gygax (league games: 30)
—	MF	ROU	Adrian Ilie (league games: 23)
—	MF	SUI	Xavier Margairaz (league games: 16)
—	DF	SUI	David Pallas (league games: 9)
—	MF	ARM	Artur Petrosyan (league games: 13)
—	MF	SUI	Marc Schneider (league games: 29)
—	MF	ROU	Mihai Tararache (league games: 29)
—	MF	SUI	Daniel Tarone (league games: 28)
—	FW	GEO	Vladimir Akhalaia (league games: 5)
—	FW	ARG	Francisco Guerrero (league games: 16)
—	FW	SUI	Michael Hohl (league games: 0)
—	FW	GUI	Alhassane Keita (league games: 30)
—	FW	SUI	Krešimir Stanić (league games: 0)
—	FW	SUI	Ursal Yasar (league games: 9)

Players who joined the squad

The following is the list of players that joined the FCZ first team squad in the off or pre-season or during the winter-break transfer window. It also includes players that advanced from the youth team during the season and achieved at least one domestic league appearance.

Note: Flags indicate national team as defined under FIFA eligibility rules; some limited exceptions apply. Players may hold more than one non-FIFA nationality.

No.	Pos.	Nation	Player
—	FW	GEO	Vladimir Akhalaia (on loan from Dinamo Tbilisi)
—	DF	ARG	Diego Capria (from San Lorenzo de Almagro)
—	FW	SUI	Michael Hohl (returned after loan to Kriens)
—	MF	SUI	Xavier Margairaz (from Xamax)

No.	Pos.	Nation	Player
—	DF	SUI	Florian Stahel (from youth team)
—	DF	SUI	Daniel Stucki (on loan from Concordia Basel)
—	MF	ROU	Mihai Tararache (from Grasshopper Club)

Players who left the squad

The following is the list of the FCZ first team players that left the squad, either during the previous season or in the off-season, before the new domestic season began.

Note: Flags indicate national team as defined under FIFA eligibility rules; some limited exceptions apply. Players may hold more than one non-FIFA nationality.

No.	Pos.	Nation	Player
—	DF	MAR	Tariq Chihab (to Grasshopper Club)
—	DF	SUI	Ivan Dal Santo (to YF Juventus)
—	DF	SUI	Stephan Keller (on loan to Aarau)
—	DF	CRO	Stipe Matić (to Hapoel Be'er Sheva)
—	MF	ITA	Luca Iodice (to Winterthur)

No.	Pos.	Nation	Player
—	MF	SUI	Maxime Sanou (to Servette)
—	MF	CAM	Augustine Simo (to Aarau)
—	FW	TUR	Mahir Cayir (to Baden)
—	FW	SUI	André Muff (returned to Basel after loan)

== Results ==
Legend

Win Draw Loss Postponed

=== Super League ===
==== First half of season ====
The Super League started on 17 July 2004 and the first half was to be completed on 11 December, then came the winter break. The league season was originally contested by ten teams.

17 July 2004 Round 1	Grasshopper Club	1–1	Zürich	Hardturm, Zürich
19:30	Castillo (yellow card) 7'; Muff 6' (1:0); Cabanas (yellow card) 20'	FCZ summary	11' (1:1) Gygax; (yellow card) 29' Tarone; (yellow card) 33' Di Jorio; (yellow card) 39' Stahel; (yellow card) 90+3' César	Attendance: 13,100; Referee: (Switzerland) Nicole Petignat (Courgenay)
Note: FCZ youth player Stahel made his professional debut.

27 July 2004 Round 2	Zürich	3–1	St. Gallen	Letzigrund, Zürich
19:30	Keita 12' (1:0); César 22' (2:0); Pallas (yellow card) 53'; César (yellow card) 72'; Gygax 78' (3:1); Pallas (yellow card) (yellow-red card) 83'	FCZ summary	(yellow card) 19' Imhof; (yellow card) 62' Agouda; 71' (2:1) Agouda; (yellow card) 73' Schicker	Attendance: 10,800; Referee: (Switzerland) Claudio Circhetta (Muttenz)

31 July 2004 Round 3	Zürich	1–0	Thun	Letzigrund, Zürich
19:30	Nef 16' (1:0); Tararache (yellow card) 90+3'	FCZ summary	(yellow card) 51' Baykal; (yellow card) 65' Renggli	Attendance: 8,600; Referee: (Switzerland) Sascha Kever (Vezia)
Note: FCZ without Pallas (suspended).

6 August 2004 Round 4	Basel	2–1	Zürich	St. Jakob-Park, Basel
19:30	Giménez 16' (1:0); Delgado (yellow card) 27'; Chipperfield 48' (2:0); Cantaluppi (yellow card) 85'	FCB summary FCZ summary	(yellow card) 16' Filipescu; (yellow card) 43' Nef; 75' (2:1) Petrosyan	Attendance: 27,835; Referee: (Switzerland) Markus Nobs (Wohlen bei Bern)
Note: FCB without Atouba (abroad until Sunday for transfer negotiations) and Ergic (longterm illness). FCZ without Bastida, Stanic and Yasar (all injured). 67th minute: A lobbed ball from Ilie hit the crossbar.

14 August 2004 Round 5	Zürich	1–3	Aarau	Letzigrund, Zürich
19:30	Petrosyan 34' (pen.); Ilie (yellow card) 34'	FCZ summary FCA summary	(yellow card) 16' Varela; 22' (0:1) Bieli; (yellow card) 34' Bühler; (yellow card) 69' Bättig; 78' (1:2) Bieli; 81' (1:3) Dugić; (yellow card) 89' Vardanyan	Attendance: 9,200; Referee: (Switzerland) Philippe Leuba (Chexbres)

31 August 2004 Round 6	Servette	2–1	Zürich	Stade de Genève, Lancy
19:30	Oliveira (yellow card) 13'; Hassli 31' (1:0); Kader 74' (2:0)	FCZ summary	(yellow card) 66' Tararache; 78' (o.g.) (Furo); (yellow card) 80' Guerrero; (yellow card) 90+1' Di Jorio	Attendance: 8,750; Referee: (Switzerland) Guido Wildhaber (Kerzers)

28 August 2004 Round 7	Xamax	1–1	Zürich	Stade Charrière, La Chaux-de-Fonds
19:30	M'Futi (yellow card) 27'; Maraninchi 41' (1:1)	FCZ summary	41' (0:1) Ilie; (yellow card) 50' Nef; (yellow card) 70' Pallas	Attendance: 5,100; Referee: (Switzerland) Urs Meier (Wettingen and Würenlos)
Note: Xamax played their home games in la Charrière between July 2004 and February 2007 while the old Stade de la Maladière was demolished and the new stadium was constructed on the same site.

11 September 2004 Round 8	Zürich	2–3	Young Boys	Letzigrund, Zürich
19:30	Nef 10' (1:0); Di Jorio 28' (2:0); Capria (yellow card) 42'; Tararache (yellow card) 51'; Ilie (yellow card) 55'	FCZ summary	36' (2:1) Maksimović; 58' (2:2) Häberli; 81' (2:3) Carreño; (yellow card) 81' Carreño; (yellow card) 89' Häberli	Attendance: 7,500; Referee: (Switzerland) Claudio Circhetta (Muttenz)
Note: 13th minute, YB defender Sermeter substituted out injured.

22 September 2004 Round 9	Schaffhausen	2–1	Zürich	Stadion Breite, Schaffhausen
19:30	Franciel 28' (1:0); Tsawa (yellow card) 50'; Todisco 58' (2:0); Caló (yellow card) 68'	FCZ summary	(yellow card) 39' Nef; (yellow card) 40' Capria; (yellow card) 47' (yellow-red card) 52' Buess; (yellow card) 56' Yasar; 81' (2:1) César	Attendance: 3,850; Referee: (Switzerland) Martin Salm (Veltheim, Aargau)

26 September 2004 Round 10	Zürich	2–0	Grasshopper Club	Letzigrund, Zürich
16:15	Keita (yellow card) 12'; Keita 32' (1:0); Tararache (yellow card) 56'; César 80' (2:0); Capria (yellow card) 80'	FCZ summary	(yellow card) 50' Lichtsteiner; (yellow card) 82' Núñez	Attendance: 10,800; Referee: (Switzerland) Florian Etter
Note: FCZ without Buess (suspended).

12 October 2004 Round 11	St. Gallen	1–2	Zürich	Espenmoos, St. Gallen
19:30	Jenny (yellow card) 45'; Wolf (yellow card) 54'; Pavlovic 88' (1:2)	FCZ summary	(yellow card) 9' Tarone; (yellow card) 29' Di Jorio; (yellow card) 43' Keita; (yellow card) 55' Gygax; 62' (0:1) Di Jorio; (yellow card) 65' Nef; (yellow card) 70' Džemaili; 77' (0:2) Gygax	Attendance: 8,200; Referee: (Switzerland) Guido Wildhaber (Kerzers)

16 October 2004 Round 12	Thun	0–1	Zürich	Stadion Lachen, Thun
19:30	Deumi (yellow card) 37'	FCZ summary	(yellow card) 21' Petrosyan; (yellow card) 42' Filipescu; 60' (1:0) Di Jorio; (yellow card) 64' Di Jorio; (yellow card) 82' Gygax; (yellow card) 86' Nef; (red card) 90' Keita	Attendance: 4,000; Referee: (Switzerland) Jérôme Laperrière (Kerzers)

31 October 2004 Round 13	Zürich	0–0	Basel	Letzigrund, Zürich
16:15	Tararache (yellow card) 28'; Petrosyan (yellow card) 90+1'; César (yellow card) 90+2'	FCB summary FCZ summary	(yellow card) 60' Giménez; (red card) 88' Chipperfield; (yellow card) 90+2' Degen	Attendance: 19,200 (sold out); Referee: (Switzerland) Guido Wildhaber (Kerzers)
Note: FCZ without Keita, Di Jorio and Nef (all suspended), as well as Abdi and Stanic (both injured) and Bastida (not in the squad). FCB without Delgado and Murat Yakin (both injured) and Ergic (longterm illness). 19th minute, substituted out injured.

7 November 2004 Round 14	Aarau	3–1	Zürich	Stadion Brügglifeld, Aarau
16:15	Bieli 11' (1:0); Bieli (yellow card) 14'; Christ (yellow card) 16'; Giallanza 26' (2:0); Stahel 62' (o.g.)	FCZ summary FCA summary	(yellow card) 13' Petrosyan; (yellow card) 66' Filipescu; (yellow card) 70' Stahel; 74' (3:1) Ilie	Attendance: 5,100; Referee: (Switzerland) Claudio Circhetta (Muttenz)

14 November 2004 Round 15	Zürich	2–1	Servette	Letzigrund, Zürich
16:00	Tarone 16' (1:0); Pallas (red card) 63'; Ilie 72' (2:1)	FCZ summary	(yellow card) 13' Valdivia; 64' (pen.) Moldovan; (yellow card) 86' Oliveira	Attendance: 6,400; Referee: (Switzerland) Carlo Bertolini (Vira-Gambarogno)

28 November 2004 Round 16	Zürich	1–2	Xamax	Letzigrund, Zürich
16:00	Stahel 32' (1:1); Schneider (yellow card) 77'	FCZ summary	9' (0:1) Ielsch; (yellow card) 52' Griffiths; (yellow card) 55' Oppliger; (yellow card) 66' Margairaz; (yellow card) 68' Ielsch; 83' (og 1:2) (Stahel); (yellow card) 89' Zambaz	Attendance: 7,200; Referee: (Switzerland) Urs Meier (Wettingen and Würenlos)
Note: FCZ without Pallas (suspended)

5 December 2004 Round 17	Young Boys	2–4	Zürich	Stadion Neufeld, Bern
14:30	Rochat (yellow card) 15'; Carreño (yellow card) 23'; Chapuisat 44' (1:1); Chapuisat 64' (pen.) de Napoli (yellow card) 68'; Aziawonou (yellow card) 71'	FCZ summary	(yellow card) 14' Nef; (yellow card) 18' Tararache; 25' (0:1) Gygax; 53' (1:2) Keita; 59' (1:3) Keita; (yellow card) 73' Di Jorio; (yellow card) 74' Gygax; 83' (2:4) Ilie; (yellow card) 86' Filipescu	Attendance: 6,700; Referee: (Switzerland) Nicole Petignat (Courgenay)
Note: The Young Boys played their home games in the Stadion Neufeld after the Wankdorf Stadium was demolished in 2001 and the new Stadion Wankdorf was constructed on the same site.

12 December 2004 Round 18	Zürich	1–1	Schaffhausen	Letzigrund, Zürich
16:00	Keita 44' (1:1); Ilie (yellow card) 48'; Tararache (yellow card) 65'	FCZ summary	39' (0:1) Truckenbrod; (yellow card) 45' Franciel; (yellow card) 66' Todisco; (yellow card) 78' Tsawa; (yellow card) 90+1' Ademi	Attendance: 7,800; Referee: (Switzerland) Philippe Leuba (Chexbres)

==== Second half of season ====
On 4 February 2005 the parent company of Servette FC was declared bankrupt. It had run debts of over 10 million Swiss francs, having not paid the players since the previous November, and consequently the club suffered an exodus of players looking for paying clubs. As a consequence of the bankruptcy Servette FC had their license revoked, the club's second half matches were entirely cancelled. The second half of the season was therefore competed with only nine clubs. These each played another double round-robin. Each of the nine clubs had played 34 matches at the end of the season. This stage started on 20 February and the season was completed on 29 May.

20 February 2005 Round 19	Zürich	2–0	Schaffhausen	Letzigrund, Zürich
16:15	Filipescu (yellow card) 16'; Margairaz 73' (1:0); Margairaz 90+1' (2:0)	FCZ summary		Attendance: 4,800; Referee: (Switzerland) Markus Nobs (Wohlen bei Bern)
Note: Margairaz played his Super League debut for FCZ.

27 February 2005 Round 20	Thun	P–P	Zürich	Stadion Lachen, Thun
		[ FCZ summary]
Note: The match was postponed and rescheduled due to bad weather.

2 March 2005 Round 21	Aarau	P–P	Zürich	Stadion Brügglifeld, Aarau
		[ FCZ summary]
Note: The match was postponed and rescheduled to the 6 April 2005 due to bad weather.

6 March 2005 Round 22	Zürich	0–0	Xamax	Letzigrund, Zürich
16:00	Filipescu (yellow card) 74'	FCZ summary	(yellow card) 44' Cordonnier	Attendance: 4,800; Referee: (Switzerland) Carlo Bertolini (Vira-Gambarogno)

13 March 2005 Round 23	Zürich	0–5	Young Boys	Letzigrund, Zürich
16:15	Schneider (yellow card) 45'	FCZ summary	(yellow card) 3' Melunović; 14' (0:1) Neri; 21' (0:2) Neri; 25' (o.g.) (Nef); (yellow card) 26' de Napoli; 30' (0:4) Rochat; 72' (0:5) Sermeter	Attendance: 6,200; Referee: (Switzerland) Guido Wildhaber (Kerzers)

16 March 2005 Round 24	Servette	Cancelled	Zürich	Stade de Genève, Lancy
		[ FCZ summary]

20 March 2005 Round 25	Zürich	2–2	Basel	Letzigrund, Zürich
16:15	Margairaz 59' (1:0); Nef (yellow card) 85'; Cesar 90+3' (pen. 2:2)	FCB summary FCZ summary	(yellow card) 61' Kléber; (yellow card) 65' Zwyssig; 76' (1:1) Delgado; (yellow card) 81' P. Degen; 87' (1:2) Huggel; (yellow card) 90+2' Sterjovski	Attendance: 13,200; Referee: (Switzerland) Martin Salm (Veltheim, Aargau)
Note: FCZ without Tarone, Stanic, Petrosjan, Hohl and Capria (all injured). FCB without Yakin, Smiljanic, Rossi and Petric (all injured).

3 April 2005 Round 26	St. Gallen	4–5	Zürich	Espenmoos, St. Gallen
16:15	López 1' (1:0); Razzetti (yellow card) 23'; Hassli 64' (pen.); Merenda 65' (3:4); López 81' (4:5)	FCZ summary	23' (pen.) César; (yellow card) 25' Nef; 33' (1:2) Keita; (yellow card) 36' Džemaili; 42' (1:3) Džemaili; (yellow card) 45' César; 57' (1:4) César; (yellow card) 62' Taini; (yellow card) 66' Schneider; 69' (3:5) Keita	Attendance: 9,000; Referee: (Switzerland) Jérôme Laperrière (Kerzers)
Note: 23rd minute, foul by FCSG goalkeeper Razzetti, yellow card and penalty against him. 62nd minute, foul by FCZ goalkeeper Taini, yellow card and penalty against him.

6 April 2005 Round 21	Aarau	2–3	Zürich	Stadion Brügglifeld, Aarau
18:45	Fejzulahi 10' (pen.); Bieli 16' (2:0)	FCZ summary	60' (2:1) Gygax; 72' (o.g.) (Oliver Stöckli); 85' (2:3) Ilie	Attendance: 4,500; Referee: (Switzerland) Cyril Zimmermann (Bolligen)

10 April 2005 Round 27	Zürich	1–1	Grasshopper Club	Letzigrund, Zürich
14:15	Džemaili (yellow card) 4'; Tarone (red card) 8'; Ilie (yellow card) 42'; Ilie 64' (1:1)	FCZ summary	(yellow card) 22' Salatić; 56' (0:1) Mitreski; (yellow card) 77' Chihab; (yellow card) 80' Spycher	Attendance: 14,200; Referee: (Switzerland) René Rogalla (Wallisellen)

14 April 2005 Round 29	Zürich	0–2	St. Gallen	Letzigrund, Zürich
19:30	Filipescu (yellow card) 55'	FCZ summary	29' (0:1) Sutter; (yellow card) 58' Callà; 75' (0:2) Pavlović; (yellow card) 88' Pavlović	Attendance: 6,400; Referee: (Switzerland) Guido Wildhaber (Kerzers)
Note: This match was brought forward from 20 April.

17 April 2005 Round 28	Grasshopper Club	1–1	Zürich	Hardturm, Zürich
16:15	Muff (red card) 51'; Mitreski (yellow card) 60'; Rogério (yellow card) 64'; Eduardo 78' (1:1); Eduardo (yellow card) 84'; Cabanas (yellow card) 90'; Touré (yellow card) 90+1'	FCZ summary	8' (1:0) Keita; (yellow card) 19' Tararache; (yellow card) 45' Keita; (red card) 51' César; (yellow card) 84' Nef	Attendance: 13,500; Referee: (Switzerland) Carlo Bertolini (Vira-Gambarogno)

24 April 2005 Round 30	Basel	3–2	Zürich	St. Jakob-Park, Basel
16:15	Rossi (yellow card) 43'; Barberis (yellow card) 45'; Giménez 55' (1:2); Giménez 50' (2:2); Giménez (penalty missed) 59′ Smiljanić 75' (3:2)	FCB summary FCZ summary	3' (0:1) Margairaz; 30' (0:2) Gygax; (yellow card) 38' Di Jorio; (yellow card) 56' Taini; (yellow card) 61' Džemaili	Attendance: 25,768; Referee: (Switzerland) Massimo Busacca (Monte Carasso/Bellinzona)
Note: FCB without Carignano, Huggel and Petric (all injured), and Yakin (played with the reserve team on the day before). FCZ without Akalahia, Capria, Stanic, Hohl, Petrosjan and Schneider (all injured), as well as Abdi and César (both suspended). 3rd minute, a shot from Margairaz hit the post. 59th minute, the ball was shot wide of the goal by Gimenez, with the penalty awarded following a foul.

27 April 2005 Round 20	Thun	5–1	Zürich	Stadion Lachen, Thun
18:45	Lustrinelli 43' (1:1); Lustrinelli 58' (2:1); Gerber 69' (3:1); Gelson 74' (4:1); Gelson 88' (5:1)	FCZ summary	34' (0:1) Ilie; (red card) 56' Nef; (yellow card) 58' Gygax; (yellow card) 67' Margairaz	Attendance: 4,850; Referee: (Switzerland) Jérôme Laperrière (Kerzers)
Note: Match originally scheduled for 27 February, was rescheduled after postponement.

1 May 2005 Round 31	Zürich	Cancelled	Servette	Letzigrund, Zürich
		[ FCZ summary]

8 May 2005 Round 32	Young Boys	1–1	Zürich	Stadion Neufeld, Bern
16:15	Melunović (yellow card); Neri 20' (1:0)	FCZ summary	23' (pen. 1:1) César; (yellow card) 69' Ilie	Attendance: 5,500; Referee: (Switzerland) Sascha Kever (Vezia)
Note: The Young Boys played their home games in the Stadion Neufeld after the Wankdorf Stadium was demolished in 2001 and the new Stadion Wankdorf was constructed on the same site. FCZ without defender Alain Nef (suspended). 61st miniute, FCZ defender Filipescu substituted out injured.

11 May 2005 Round 33	Schaffhausen	2–1	Zürich	Stadion Breite, Schaffhausen
19:30	Leu (yellow card) 30'; Carlos 38' (pen. 1:1); Carlos 61' (2:0); Carlos (yellow card) 62'	FCZ summary	(yellow card) 32' Tararache; (yellow card) 37' Stahel; (yellow card) 43' Gygax; 90+1' (2:1) Tarone	Attendance: 2,650; Referee: (Switzerland) Carlo Bertolini (Vira-Gambarogno)

19 May 2005 Round 34	Zürich	6–3	Thun	Letzigrund, Zürich
19:30	Di Jorio 16' (1:1); Keita 24' (2:1); Margairaz 28' (3:1); Džemaili (yellow card) 31'; Tarone 44' (4:2); Di Jorio 70' (5:2); Keita 87' (6:2)	FCZ summary	3' (0:1) Raimondi; 34' (3:2) Gelson; (yellow card) 78' Milicevic; 90+1' (6:3) Raimondi	Attendance: 4,200; Referee: (Switzerland) Martin Salm (Veltheim, Aargau)

22 May 2005 Round 35	Xamax	1–2	Zürich	Stade Charrière, La Chaux-de-Fonds
16:30	Buengo 24' (1:0); Barea (yellow card) 88'; Cordonnier (yellow card) 39' (yellow-red card) 90+1'	FCZ summary	(yellow card) 8' Rapisarda; 48' (1:1) Gygax; 50' (1:2) Di Jorio	Attendance: 2,900; Referee: (Switzerland) Florian Etter
Note: Xamax played their home games in la Charrière between July 2004 and February 2007 while the old Stade de la Maladière was demolished and the new stadium was constructed on the same site.

29 May 2005 Round 36	Zürich	2–0	Aarau	Letzigrund, Zürich
16:15	Džemaili (yellow card) 64'; César 90' (pen.); Keita 90+1' (2:0)	FCZ summary FCA summary		Attendance: 7,800; Referee: (Switzerland) Guido Wildhaber (Kerzers)
Note: 30th minute, a shot from Keita hit the post. 83 minute FCA striker Dugić was substituted out injured.

==== Final league table ====
Pos	Team	Pld	W	D	L	GF	GA	GD	Pts	Qualification or relegation
1	Basel	34	21	7	6	81	45	+36	70	Swiss champions qualification to Champions League third qualifying round
2	Thun	34	18	6	10	69	42	+27	60	qualification to Champions League second qualifying round
3	Grasshopper Club	34	12	14	8	51	50	+1	50	qualification to UEFA Cup second qualifying round
4	Young Boys	34	12	13	9	60	52	+8	49	entered Intertoto Cup second round
5	Zürich	34	13	9	12	55	57	−2	48	Swiss Cup winners qualification to UEFA Cup second qualifying round (Note: Qualified as 2004–05 Swiss Cup winners)
6	Xamax	34	10	8	16	36	48	−12	38	entered Intertoto Cup first round
7	St. Gallen	34	8	12	14	51	60	−9	36	
8	Aarau	34	7	11	16	42	64	−22	32	
9	Schaffhausen	34	7	11	16	36	59	−23	32	qualification to relegation play-off
10	Servette (Note: Servette were docked three points for financial irregularities.) (R)	18	6	5	7	24	28	−4	20	relegated to 2005–06 1. Liga (Note: Servette went bankrupt during the winter break and did not play the second half of the season. Restart in the 3rd level (1. Liga) in 2005/06)

Source: RSSSF
Rules for classification: 1) points; 2) goal difference; 3) number of goals scored.
(R) Relegated

=== Swiss Cup ===
This season's Swiss Cup was the 80th edition of the annual cup competition. It began on 17/18/19 September with the games of Round 1 and ended on 16 May 2005 with the final held at St. Jakob-Park, Basel. The winners earned a place in the second qualifying round of the UEFA Cup. Teams from Super League and Challenge League were seeded in the first round. In a match, the home advantage was granted to the team from the lower league, if applicable.

17 September 2004 Round 1	FC Kickers Luzern	1–4	Zürich	Stadion Auf Tribschen, Lucerne
19:30	(Capria) 18' (o.g.); Ribeiro (yellow card) 55'	FCZ summary SFV summary	16' (0:1) Capria; 65' (1:2) Di Jorio; (yellow card) 73' Buess; (yellow card) 75' Di Jorio; 78' (1:3) Tarone; 84' (1:4) Keita	Attendance: 1,800; Referee: (Switzerland) Massimo Busacca (Monte Carasso/Bellinzona)
Note: In the 2004/05 season, Kickers Luzern played in the 2. Liga interregional (at that time the fourth-highest tier in the Swiss football system).

24 October 2004 Round 2	FC Herisau	2–7	Zürich	Ebnet, Herisau
14:30	Golem (yellow card) 24'; Blazanovic 51' (1:4); Caliano 63' (2:5); Obrenovic (yellow card) 69'; Lapcevic (yellow card) 70'; Gambino (yellow card) 84'	FCZ summary SFL summary	11' (0:1) Petrosyan; 16' (0:2) Ilie; 18' (pen.) Tarone; 34' (0:4) Di Jorio; 62' (1:5) Ilie; 79' (2:6) Ilie; 83' (2:7) Ilie; (yellow card) 84' César	Attendance: 2,400; Referee: (Switzerland) Nicole Petignat (Courgenay)
Note: In the 2004/05 season, FC Herisau played in the 1. Liga (Group 3), which was the third-highest tier of Swiss football at the time.

21 November 2005 Round 3	Xamax	0–2	Zürich	Stade Charrière, La Chaux-de-Fonds
14:30	von Bergen (yellow card) 18'; M'Futi (yellow card) 57'; Soufiani (yellow card) 67'; Maraninchi (yellow card) 83'; Ielsch (yellow card) 90+1'	FCZ summary SFL summary	(yellow card) 3' Di Jorio; (yellow card) 18' Nef; 36' (0:1) Keita; (yellow card) 67' Gygax; 90+2' (pen.) César	Attendance: 2,100; Referee: (Switzerland) Massimo Busacca (Monte Carasso/Bellinzona)

13 February 2005 Quarter-final	AC Bellinzona	0–2	Zürich	Stadio Comunale, Bellinzona
14:30	Melosi (yellow card) 47'; Cesaretti (yellow card) 75'; Grossi (yellow card) 85'	FCZ summary SFL summary	(yellow card) 5' Schneider; 15' (o.g.) (Bell); 41' (0:2) Keita; (yellow card) 57' Ilie; (yellow card) 88' Nef	Attendance: 4,000; Referee: (Switzerland) Guido Wildhaber (Kerzers)
Note: In the 2004/05 season, AC Bellinzona played in the Swiss Challenge League (the second-highest tier of Swiss football).

20 April 2005 Semi-final	Zürich	3–1	BSC Young Boys	Letzigrund, Zürich
20:15	Filipescu (yellow card) 13'; Tararache (yellow card) 38'; Džemaili (yellow card) 44'; Gygax 48'; Keita 70' (2:0); Keita 86' (3:1)	FCZ summary SFL summary	(yellow card) 19' Rochat; (yellow card) 22' Carreño; (yellow card) 50' Disler; (yellow card) 56' de Napoli; 75' Urdaneta; (yellow card) 77' Urdaneta	Attendance: 9,800; Referee: (Switzerland) Claudio Circhetta (Muttenz)

16 May 2005 Final	Luzern	1–3	Zürich	St. Jakob-Park, Basel
15:00	Andreoli (yellow card) 22'; Andreoli 87'	FCZ summary SFL summary	(yellow card) 19' Tararache; 19' Schneider; 62' Keita; (yellow card) 67' César; 74' Tararache	Attendance: 33,433 (sold out); Referee: (Switzerland) Philippe Leuba (Chexbres)
Note: 24th minute, FCL midfielder Pirmin Schwegler substituted out injured. 29th minute, FCZ defender Alain Nef substituted out injured.

FCZ won the cup and qualified for the 2005–06 UEFA Cup second qualifying round. This was FCZ's seventh cup win to this date.

=== Friendly matches ===
==== Pre-season ====
12 June 2004 Exhibition game	St. Gallen	3–4	Zürich	Wattwil
	Njanke 49' (1:1); Tachie-Mensah 51' (2:1); Tachie-Mensah 53' (3:1); Jenny (red card) 79'	FCZ summary	20' (0:1) Petrosyan; 55' (3:2) Karen Aleksanyan; 66' (3:3) Guerrero; 86' (3:4) Keita	Attendance: 850; Referee: (Switzerland) Reto Rutz (Amriswil)
Note: Both teams with various test players.

19 June 2004 Exhibition game	Young Boys	3–2	Zürich	Stucki, Thörishaus, Köniz
	Magnin 24' (1:1); Magnin 54' (2:1); Knez 84' (3:2); Coubageat (yellow card) 88'	FCZ summary	9' (0:1) Marquinhos; (yellow card) 19' Aleksanyan; 80' (2:2) Tarone	Attendance: 1,000; Referee: (Switzerland) Cyril Zimmermann (Bolligen)
Note: Both teams with various youth ans test players.

23 June 2004 Exhibition game	SV Wörgl	2–2	Zürich	Seefeld in Tirol
	Muslić 53' (1:2); Schwarz 55' (2:2)	FCZ summary	32' (0:1) Guerrero; 52' (0:2) Petrosyan
Note: Training camp in Seefeld in Tirol, Austria.

26 June 2004 Exhibition game	Zürich	1–3	Dinamo București	Peterswinkel , Lachen, Switzerland
18:00	César 21' (1:1)	FCZ summary	7' (0:1) Dănciulescu; 64' (1:2) Alistar; 75' (1:3) Dănciulescu	Attendance: 1,200; Referee: (Switzerland) Daniel Haas
Note: Match held as part of the opening of the Peterswinkel sports ground.

3 July 2004 Exhibition game	Zürich	2–1	Aarau	Gerbihof, Ibach
	Filipescu 16' (1:0); Petrosyan 56' (2:0)	FCZ summary	90+1' (2:1) Menezes	Attendance: 586; Referee: (Switzerland) Reto Rutschi

8 July 2004 Exhibition game	Zürich	4–2	Schaffhausen	Prakerwiesen, Diessenhofen
	Petrosyan 11' (1:0); Nogueira 28' (2:1); Nogueira 42' (3:1); Gygax 54' (4:1)	FCZ summary	21' (1:1) Franciel; 60' (4:2) Todisco	Attendance: 1,035; Referee: (Switzerland) René Rogalla (Wallisellen)
Note: Maximiliano Ayala: Argentine trialist; Jackson Nogueira: Brazilian trialist.

11 July 2004 Exhibition game	Zürich	0–2	Köln	Letzigrund, Zürich
		FCZ summary	13' (0:1) Guié-Mien; 33' (0:2) Guié-Mien	Attendance: 5,500; Referee: (Switzerland) Urs Meier (Wettingen and Würenlos)

13 July 2004 Exhibition game	Zürich	3–2	FC Red Star Zürich	Letzigrund, Zürich
	Haziri 2' (1:0); Guerrero 38' (2:0); Guerrero 89' (3:2)	FCZ summary	(2:1) (2:2)	Attendance: 380
Note: Both teams with various youth ans test players.

31 August 2004 Mid-season	Chiasso	0–4	Zürich	Stadio Comunale Riva IV, Chiasso
		FCZ summary	19' (0:1) Yasar; 39' (0:2) Keita; 70' (0:3); 89' (0:4) Abdi	Attendance: 300; Referee: (Switzerland) Sascha Kever (Vezia)

==== Winter break ====
16 January 2005 Exhibition game	Karlsruher SC	5–5	Zürich	Wildparkstadion, Karlsruhe
	Masmanidis 22' (1:1); Kapllani 56' (2:2); Männer 62' (3:2); Kapllani 70' (4:2); Reule 82' (5:2); Kritzer (yellow card)	FCZ summary	14' (0:1) Ilie; 44' (1:2) Ilie; 83' (5:3) Guerrero; 85' (pen.) César; 88' (5:5) Akhalaia	Attendance: 1,900
Note: Sub-zero temperatures in Karlsruhe. The match took place on the outdoor pitch.

19 January 2005 Exhibition game	Vaduz	2–3	Zürich	Rheinpark Stadion, Vaduz
	Sumiala 61' (1:1); Sumiala 80' (2:3)	FCZ summary	12' (0:1) Keita; 64' (1:2) Guerrero; 67' (1:3) Ilie	Attendance: 350
Note: The game took place on an outdoor pitch that was difficult to play on. The first goal for Vaduz was scored by a player named Edu. No information available anywhere…

25 January 2005 Exhibition game	Zürich	3–0	Dinamo Zagreb	Camp de futbol La Figuereta, Canet d’en Berenguer
	Nef (1:0); Di Jorio (2:0); Ilie (3:0)	FCZ summary
Note: Match as part of the training camp in Spain.

28 January 2005 Exhibition game	Zürich	0–4	Shakhtar Donetsk	Camp de futbol La Figuereta, Canet d’en Berenguer
		FCZ summary	5' (0:1) Aghahowa; 11' (0:2) Aghahowa; 38' (0:3) Aghahowa; 81' (0:4) Moldovan
Note: Match as part of the training camp in Spain.

30 January 2005 Exhibition game	Zürich	0–3	Sparta Prague	Parador de El Saler, El Saler (Valencia)
		FCZ summary	35' (pen.) Rezek; 52' (0:2) Meduna; 54' (0:3) Jun
Note: Match as part of the training camp in Spain.

6 February 2005 Exhibition game	Zürich	0–0	Bregenz	Letzigrund, Zürich
		FCZ summary		Attendance: 500; Referee: (Switzerland) René Rogalla (Wallisellen)

9 February 2005 Exhibition game	Zürich	3–0	Winterthur	Letzigrund, Zürich
	Schneider 45' (1:0); Gavric 77' (2:0); Di Jorio 84' (3:0)	FCZ summary		Attendance: 500; Referee: (Switzerland) Claudio Bernold

== Sources ==
- dbFCZ Homepage
- Switzerland 2004–05 at RSSSF

Preceded by 2003–04	FC Zürich seasons	Succeeded by 2005–06
