= 2004–05 in Swiss football =

Football in Switzerland
- Season: 2004–05

Men's football
- Super League: Basel
- Challenge League: Yverdon-Sport
- 1. Liga: Group 1: Lausanne-Sport; Group 2: Biel-Bienne; Group 3: Tuggen
- Swiss Cup: Zürich

Women's football
- Swiss Women's Super League: SC LUwin.ch Luzern
- Swiss Cup: SC LUwin.ch Luzern

The following is a summary of the 2004–05 season of competitive football in Switzerland.

== Super League ==
=== Final league table ===
Pos	Team	Pld	W	D	L	GF	GA	GD	Pts	Qualification or relegation
1	Basel (C)	34	21	7	6	81	45	+36	70	Qualification to Champions League third qualifying round
2	Thun	34	18	6	10	69	42	+27	60	Qualification to Champions League second qualifying round
3	Grasshopper	34	12	14	8	51	50	+1	50	Qualification to UEFA Cup second qualifying round
4	Young Boys	34	12	13	9	60	52	+8	49	Qualification to Intertoto Cup second round
5	Zürich	34	13	9	12	55	57	−2	48	Qualification to UEFA Cup second qualifying round (Note: via 2004–05 Swiss Cup)
6	Neuchâtel Xamax	34	10	8	16	36	48	−12	38	Qualification to Intertoto Cup first round
7	St. Gallen	34	8	12	14	51	60	−9	36	
8	Aarau	34	7	11	16	42	64	−22	32	
9	Schaffhausen (O)	34	7	11	16	36	59	−23	32	Qualification to relegation play-off
10	Servette (Note: Servette were docked three points for financial irregularities.) (R, R)	18	6	5	7	24	28	−4	20	Not admitted to Swiss Challenge League and withdrew (Note: Servette was forced to withdraw from the championship at the end of the first round of the season and demoted to the Second Division.)

Source: RSSSF
Rules for classification: 1) points; 2) goal difference; 3) number of goals scored.
(C) Champions; (O) Play-off winners; (R) Relegated

== Challenge League ==
=== Final league table ===
Pos	Team	Pld	W	D	L	GF	GA	GD	Pts	Promotion or relegation
1	Yverdon-Sport FC (C, P)	34	20	10	4	59	26	+33	70	Promotion to 2005–06 Swiss Super League
2	FC Vaduz	34	21	6	7	58	28	+30	69	Qualification for Promotion play-off
3	FC Sion	34	19	11	4	63	33	+30	68	
4	FC Chiasso	34	20	5	9	60	37	+23	65	
5	FC Lucerne	34	19	2	13	73	53	+20	59	
6	AC Bellinzona	34	17	6	11	58	46	+12	57	
7	FC Concordia Basel	34	13	12	9	52	40	+12	51	
8	AC Lugano	34	14	8	12	49	46	+3	50	
9	SC Kriens	34	11	15	8	46	37	+9	48	
10	FC La Chaux-de-Fonds	34	12	7	15	57	56	+1	43	
11	FC Winterthur	34	11	8	15	46	53	−7	41	
12	FC Baulmes	34	12	5	17	31	54	−23	41	
13	FC Wil	34	10	10	14	45	54	−9	40	
14	FC Meyrin	34	9	8	17	39	61	−22	35	
15	FC Wohlen	34	8	7	19	38	63	−25	31	
16	SC YF Juventus	34	8	5	21	43	71	−28	29	
17	FC Baden	34	7	7	20	39	62	−23	28	
18	FC Bulle (R)	34	6	6	22	43	79	−36	24	Relegated to 2005–06 Swiss 1. Liga

Source: RSSSF
(C) Champions; (P) Promoted; (R) Relegated

=== Promotion/relegation play-offs ===
The ninth-placed team in the 2004–05 Swiss Super League, Schaffhausen, played a two-legged play-off against the Challenge League runners-up, Vaduz, for a spot in the 2005–06 Super League.

1 June 2005
19:30 CEST

Schaffhausen	1–1	Vaduz
dos Santos 8'		Zarn 78'

Stadion Breite, Schaffhausen
Attendance: 4,000
Referee: Massimo Busacca

12 June 2005
16:15 CEST

Vaduz	0–1	Schaffhausen
		Senn 73'

Rheinpark Stadion, Vaduz
Attendance: 5,066
Referee: Philippe Leuba

Schaffhausen won 2–1 on aggregate and remained in the top level. Vaduz remained in the second tier.

== 1. Liga ==
=== Group 1 ===
Pos	Team	Pld	W	D	L	GF	GA	GD	Pts	Qualification or relegation
1	FC Lausanne-Sport	30	20	3	7	64	27	+37	63	Play-off to Challenge League
2	FC Serrières	30	16	10	4	53	31	+22	58	Play-off to Challenge League
3	Étoile Carouge FC	30	18	3	9	76	49	+27	57	Play-off to Challenge League
4	FC Echallens	30	15	11	4	60	41	+19	56	
5	FC Bex	30	14	8	8	55	43	+12	50	
6	CS Chênois	30	14	4	12	53	53	0	46	
7	Young Boys U-21	30	12	8	10	48	43	+5	44	
8	FC Martigny-Sports	30	11	11	8	46	43	+3	44	
9	FC Stade Nyonnais	30	10	6	14	52	59	−7	36	
10	Grand-Lancy FC	30	9	9	12	43	51	−8	36	
11	FC Fribourg	30	9	6	15	40	49	−9	33	
12	FC Naters	30	9	5	16	54	67	−13	32	
13	Urania Genève Sport	30	8	8	14	49	62	−13	32	
14	Servette U-21	30	9	5	16	50	71	−21	32	
15	ES FC Malley	30	8	6	16	54	74	−20	30	Relegation to 2. Liga Interregional
16	FC Stade Lausanne Ouchy	30	3	7	20	31	65	−34	16	Relegation to 2. Liga Interregional

Source: Erste Liga official website
Rules for classification: 1) Points; 2) Goal difference within the league or play-off for qualifiers.

=== Group 2 ===
Pos	Team	Pld	W	D	L	GF	GA	GD	Pts	Qualification or relegation
1	FC Biel-Bienne	30	21	7	2	77	24	+53	70	Play-off to Challenge League
2	FC Wangen bei Olten	30	15	6	9	55	41	+14	51	Play-off to Challenge League
3	FC Grenchen	30	14	8	8	53	39	+14	50	
4	FC Solothurn	30	14	7	9	55	44	+11	49	
5	Zug 94	30	13	8	9	60	47	+13	47	
6	FC Münsingen	30	14	5	11	43	43	0	47	
7	Luzern U-21	30	12	6	12	50	52	−2	42	
8	FC Schötz	30	10	11	9	47	46	+1	41	
9	SC Zofingen	30	11	7	12	46	45	+1	40	
10	Basel U-21	30	10	9	11	60	49	+11	39	
11	SC Dornach	30	11	6	13	56	66	−10	39	
12	SC Cham	30	10	6	14	40	50	−10	36	
13	SR Delémont	30	10	5	15	37	53	−16	35	
14	SC Buochs	30	9	6	15	40	55	−15	33	
15	FC Alle	30	4	10	16	36	62	−26	22	Relegation to 2. Liga Interregional
16	FC Langenthal	30	5	7	18	35	74	−39	22	Relegation to 2. Liga Interregional

Source: Erste Liga official website
Rules for classification: 1) Points; 2) Goal difference within the league or play-off for qualifiers.

=== Group 3 ===
Pos	Team	Pld	W	D	L	GF	GA	GD	Pts	Qualification or relegation
1	FC Tuggen	30	21	3	6	70	37	+33	66	Play-off to Challenge League
2	FC Locarno	30	15	7	8	54	36	+18	52	Play-off to Challenge League
3	FC Red Star Zürich	30	14	9	7	64	35	+29	51	Play-off to Challenge League
4	FC Mendrisio	30	11	15	4	40	31	+9	48	
5	FC Kreuzlingen	30	13	8	9	52	48	+4	47	
6	Zürich U-21	30	12	9	9	46	40	+6	45	
7	Grasshopper Club U-21	30	13	6	11	39	36	+3	45	
8	St. Gallen U-21	30	12	6	12	43	47	−4	42	
9	GC Biaschesi	30	10	10	10	35	41	−6	40	
10	FC Herisau	30	9	10	11	38	46	−8	37	
11	FC Altstetten	30	9	7	14	29	48	−19	34	
12	FC Brugg	30	8	9	13	34	53	−19	33	
13	FC Frauenfeld	30	9	5	16	45	53	−8	32	
14	FC Seefeld Zürich	30	8	7	15	44	52	−8	31	
15	FC Chur 97	30	6	12	12	42	53	−11	30	Relegation to 2. Liga Interregional
16	FC Gossau	30	6	5	19	41	60	−19	23	Relegation to 2. Liga Interregional

Source: Erste Liga official website
Rules for classification: 1) Points; 2) Goal difference within the league or play-off for qualifiers.

=== Promotion play-off ===
Qualified for the play-offs were the first two teams from group 1; Lausanne-Sport and Serrières, from group 2; Biel-Bienne and Wangen b.O. and from group 3; Tuggen and Locarno. The two best third best teams were Étoile Carouge from group 1 and Red Star from group 3.

==== Qualification round ====
Team 1	Score	Team 2
Étoile Carouge	1–0	Tuggen
Tuggen	1–2	Étoile Carouge

Étoile Carouge win 3–1 on aggregate and advance to Finals.

Team 1	Score	Team 2
Wangen b.O.	2–2	Lausanne-Sport
Lausanne-Sport	6–1	Wangen b.O.

Lausanne-Sport win 8–3 on aggregate and advance to Finals.

Team 1	Score	Team 2
Locarno	1–1	Serrières
Serrières	0–1	Locarno

Locarno win 2–1 on aggregate and advance to Finals.

Team 1	Score	Team 2
Red Star	4–1	Biel-Bienne
Biel-Bienne	1–2	Red Star

Red Star win 6–2 on aggregate and advance to Finals.

==== Final round ====
Team 1	Score	Team 2
Locarno	2–1	Red Star
Red Star	0–2	Locarno

Locarno win 4–1 on aggregate and are promoted to 2005–06 Challenge League.

Team 1	Score	Team 2
Lausanne-Sport	2–1	Étoile Carouge
Étoile Carouge	3–3	Lausanne-Sport

Lausanne-Sport win 5–4 on aggregate and are promoted to 2005–06 Challenge League.

== Swiss Cup ==
The game was played in the St. Jakob-Park Basel on 16 May 2005. The advantage of the home team was granted to the team that won the first drawn semi-final. The first drawn semi-final was FC Aarau drawn at home against FC Luzern, which FCL won 2–1. The other semi-final saw FC Zürich drawn at home against BSC Young Boys and the home team were successful winning 3–1.

=== Final ===
16 May 2005
15:00 CEST

FC Luzern	1 – 3	FC Zürich
Andreoli 87'	Report	19' Schneider; 62' Keita; 74' Tararache

St. Jakob-Park, Basel
Attendance: 33,433
Referee: (Switzerland) Philippe Leuba

GK	(Switzerland) David Zibung
DF	(Switzerland) Christian Schwegler
DF	(Switzerland) Pascal Castillo
DF	(Switzerland) Genc Mehmeti
MF	(Switzerland) Ronny Hodel
MF	(Croatia) Marko Sucic		(substituted off) 69'
MF	(Switzerland) Pirmin Schwegler		(substituted off) 24'
MF	(Brazil) Ratinho		(substituted off) 58'
MF	(Italy) David Andreoli	(yellow card) 22'
ST	(Cameroon) Jean-Michel Tchouga
ST	(Brazil) Paulo Vogt
Substitutes:
DF	(Oman) Michael Diethelm		(substituted in) 24'
MF	(Liberia) Alsény Këïta		(substituted in) 58'
DF	(Switzerland) André Niederhäuser		(substituted in) 69'
Manager:
(Netherlands) René van Eck

GK	(Switzerland) Davide Taini
DF	(Switzerland) Alain Nef		(substituted off) 29'
DF	(Romania) Iulian Filipescu
DF	(Switzerland) Florian Stahel
DF	(Switzerland) Marc Schneider
MF	(Switzerland) Blerim Džemaili		(substituted off) 80'
MF	(Romania) Mihai Tararache	(yellow card) 19'
MF	(Switzerland) Daniel Gygax
MF	(Switzerland) Xavier Margairaz
MF	(Switzerland) Francesco Di Jorio		(substituted off) 80'
ST	(Guinea) Alhassane Keita
Substitutes:
MF	(Brazil) Cesar	(yellow card) 67'	(substituted in) 29'
MF	(Switzerland) Daniel Tarone		(substituted in) 80'
ST	(Romania) Adrian Ilie		(substituted in) 80'
Manager:
(Switzerland) Lucien Favre

== Swiss Clubs in Europe ==
- Basel as 2003–04 champions: Champions League third qualifying round
- Young Boys as runners-up: Champions League second qualifying round
- Servette as third placed team: UEFA Cup second qualifying round
- Thun: Intertoto Cup second round
- FC Wil as 2003–04 Swiss Cup winners: UEFA Cup second qualifying round
- FC Vaduz as 2003–04 Liechtenstein Cup winners: UEFA Cup first qualifying round

=== Basel ===
==== UEFA Champions League ====
===== Third qualifying round =====
11 August 2004 First Leg	Basel (Switzerland)	1 – 1	(Italy) Internazionale	St. Jakob-Park, Basel
20:45	Cantaluppi (yellow card) 23'; Huggel 25' (1:1); Yakin (yellow card) 58'; Smiljanić (yellow card) 87'	Report	19' (0:1) Adriano; (yellow card) 30' Stanković	Attendance: 29,500 (sold out); Referee: Graham Poll

25 August 2004 Second Leg	Internazionale (Italy)	4 – 1	(Switzerland) Basel	San Siro, Milan
21:00	Adriano 1' (1:0); Stanković 12' (2:0); Adriano 52' (3:1); Álvaro Recoba 59' (4:1); Álvaro Recoba (yellow card) 60'; Edgar Davids (yellow card) 82'	Report	(yellow card) 32' Huggel; 49' (2:1) Sterjovski; (yellow card) 73' P. Degen	Attendance: 50,000; Referee: Anders Frisk

F.C. Internazionale Milano won 5 – 2 on aggregate and advance. Basel transfer to UEFA Cup.

==== UEFA Cup ====
===== First round =====
16 September 2004 First Leg	Terek Grozny (Russia)	1 – 1	(Switzerland) Basel	Lokomotiv Stadium (Moscow)
18:00	Andrei Fedkov 38' (1:0)	Report	(yellow card) 29' Rossi; 57' (1:1) Giménez	Attendance: 3,500; Referee: Tommy Skjerven

30 September 2004 Second Leg	Basel (Switzerland)	2 – 0	(Russia) Terek Grozny	St. Jakob-Park, Basel
20:15	Rossi 11' (1:0); Petrić (yellow card) 35'; Kléber 89' (2:0)	Report	(yellow card) 30' Ruslan Azhinzhal	Attendance: 15,895; Referee: Georgios Douros (Greece)

Basel won 3 – 1 on aggregate and advance to group stage.

===== Group stage / Group A =====
21 October 2004 Matchday 1	Schalke 04 (Germany)	1 – 1	(Switzerland) Basel	Arena AufSchalke, Gelsenkirchen
20:30	Kobiaschwili 8' (1:0); Altıntop (yellow card) 42'; Hanke (yellow card) 88'	Report	(yellow card) 30' Huggel; (yellow card) 66' Smiljanić; (yellow card) 70' Kléber; (yellow card) 79' D. Degen; 82' (1:1) Delgado	Attendance: 52,870; Referee: Johan Verbist

25 November 2004 Matchday 3	Basel (Switzerland)	1 – 2	(Scotland) Hearts	St. Jakob-Park, Basel
20:15	Giménez (yellow card) 65'; Carignano 76' (1:1)	Report	31' (0:1) Wyness; 89' (1:2) Neilson	Attendance: 21,645; Referee: Kristinn Jakobsson, (Iceland)

1 December 2004 Matchday 4	Ferencvárosi TC (Hungary)	1 – 2	(Switzerland) Basel	Ferenc Puskás Stadium, Budapest
20:45	Rósa 22' (1:0); Huszti (yellow card) 27'; Kapic (yellow card) 34'; Zováth (yellow card) 38'	Report	(yellow card) 52' Quennoz; (yellow card) 53' P. Degen; 59' (1:1) Rossi; (yellow card) 67' Zwyssig; (yellow card) 68' Rossi; 79' (1:2) Huggel; (yellow card) 82' Chipperfield; (yellow card) 86' D. Degen	Attendance: 22,000; Referee: Vitaliy Godulyan, (Ukraine)

16 December 2004 Matchday 5	Basel (Switzerland)	1 – 0	(Netherlands) Feyenoord	St. Jakob-Park, Basel
20:45	Carignano 53' (1:0)	Report	(yellow card) 79' Smolarek; (yellow card) 89' Bosschaart	Attendance: 25,660; Referee: Carlos Megía Dávila, (Spain)

Group A final table

Pos	Team	Pld	W	D	L	GF	GA	GD	Pts	Qualification	FEY	SCH	BSL	FER	HOM
1	(Netherlands) Feyenoord	4	2	1	1	6	3	+3	7	Advance to knockout stage	—	2–1	—	—	3–0
2	(Germany) Schalke 04	4	2	1	1	5	3	+2	7	Advance to knockout stage	—	—	1–1	2–0	—
3	(Switzerland) Basel	4	2	1	1	5	4	+1	7	Advance to knockout stage	1–0	—	—	—	1–2
4	(Hungary) Ferencváros	4	1	1	2	3	5	−2	4		1–1	—	1–2	—	—
5	(Scotland) Heart of Midlothian	4	1	0	3	2	6	−4	3		—	0–1	—	0–1	—

Source: RSSSF

===== Round of 32 =====
17 February 2005 First leg	Basel (Switzerland)	0 – 0	(France) Lille OSC	St. Jakob-Park, Basel
20:30		Report	(yellow card) 16' Debuchy; (yellow card) 69' Chalmé; (yellow card) 88' Brunel; (yellow card) 90' Cabaye	Attendance: 19,092; Referee: Anton Genov (Bulgaria)

24 February 2005 Second leg	Lille OSC (France)	2 – 0	(Switzerland) Basel	Stadium Nord Lille Métropole, Lille
21:00	Moussilou 37' (1:0); Ačimovič 78' (pen. 2:0); Bodmer (yellow card) 87'	Report	(yellow card) 78' P. Degen	Attendance: 12,000; Referee: Pedro Proença (Portugal)

Lille OSC won 2 – 0 on aggregate.

=== Young Boys ===
==== UEFA Champions League ====
===== Second qualifying round =====
28 July 2004 First leg	Young Boys (Switzerland)	2–2	(Serbia and Montenegro) Red Star Belgrade	Hardturm, Zürich (Note: Young Boys played their home match at Hardturm stadium in Zürich, instead of their regular home venue Stadion Neufeld in Bern.)
20:15	Chapuisat 6'; Eugster 65'	Report	Žigić 79', 88'	Attendance: 10,350; Referee: Pieter Vink (Netherlands)

4 August 2004 Second leg	Red Star Belgrade (Serbia and Montenegro)	3–0	(Switzerland) Young Boys	Red Star Stadium, Belgrade
20:15	Miladinović 39'; Dudić 49'; Žigić 69'	Report		Attendance: 38,500; Referee: Damien Ledentu (France)

Red Star Belgrade won 5–2 on aggregate.

=== Servette ===
==== UEFA Cup ====
===== Second qualifying round =====
12 August 2004 First leg	Újpest (Hungary)	3–1	(Switzerland) Servette	Ferenc Puskás Stadium, Budapest
20:00	Polonkai 42'; Rajczi 56'; Tóth 63'	Report	Alicarte 58' (pen.)	Attendance: 3,136; Referee: Jonas Eriksson (Sweden)

26 August 2004 Second leg	Servette (Switzerland)	0–2	(Hungary) Újpest	Stade de Genève, Geneva
20:00		Report	Bükszegi 82'; Feczesin 90'	Attendance: 5,680; Referee: Ceri Richards (Wales)

Újpest won 5–1 on aggregate.

=== Thun ===
==== UEFA Intertoto Cup ====
===== Second round =====
3 July 2004 First leg	VfL Wolfsburg (Germany)	2–3	(Switzerland) Thun	Volkswagen Arena, Wolfsburg
	Schnoor 75'; Präger 88'		Baykal 15'; Ojong 60'; Raimondi 71'	Attendance: 5,087; Referee: Anton Stredák (Slovakia)

11 July 2004 Second leg	Thun (Switzerland)	4–1	(Germany) VfL Wolfsburg	Stadion Lachen, Thun
	Lustrinelli 21'; Renggli 35' dos Santos 42'; Raimondi 45'		Sarpei 78'	Attendance: 2,870; Referee: Ben Haverkort (Netherlands)

Thun won 7–3 on aggregate.

===== Third round =====
17 July 2004 First leg	Thun (Switzerland)	2–2	(Germany) Hamburger SV	Stadion Lachen, Thun
	dos Santos 28'; Raimondi 31' (pen.)		Romeo 50', 85'	Attendance: 4,150; Referee: Selçuk Dereli (Turkey)

24 July 2004 Second leg	Hamburger SV (Germany)	3–1	(Switzerland) Thun	AOL Arena, Hamburg
	Romeo 2', 72'; Mpenza 66'		Moser 81'	Attendance: 27,200; Referee: Pascal Garibian (France)

Hamburger SV won 5–3 on aggregate.

=== Wil ===
==== UEFA Cup ====
===== Second qualifying round =====
12 August 2004 First leg	Dukla Banská Bystrica (Slovakia)	3–1	(Switzerland) Wil	Stiavnicky Stadion, Banská Bystrica
17:00	Semeník 75', 79' (pen.); Jakubko 90'	Report	Nushi 71'	Attendance: 6,210; Referee: Alexandru Tudor (Romania)

26 August 2004 Second leg	Wil (Switzerland)	1–1	(Slovakia) Dukla Banská Bystrica	Hardturm, Zürich
20:00	Zverotić 67'	Report	Semeník 61'	Attendance: 1,200; Referee: Costas Kapitanis (Cyprus)

Dukla Banská Bystrica won 4–2 on aggregate.

=== Vaduz ===
==== UEFA Cup ====
===== First qualifying round =====
15 July 2004 First leg	Vaduz (Liechtenstein)	1–0	(Republic of Ireland) Longford Town	Rheinpark Stadion, Vaduz
19:30	Polverino 73'	Report		Attendance: 1,120; Referee: Merab Malaguradze (Georgia)

29 July 2004 Second leg	Longford Town (Republic of Ireland)	2–3	(Liechtenstein) Vaduz	Tolka Park, Dublin
20:00	Fitzgerald 86'; Ferguson 88'	Report	Zarn 5'; Burgmeier 49'; Weller 54'	Attendance: 2,736; Referee: Ghenadie Orlic (Moldova)

Vaduz won 4–2 on aggregate.

===== Second qualifying round =====
12 August 2004 First leg	Beveren (Belgium)	3–1	(Liechtenstein) Vaduz	Freethiel Stadion, Beveren
20:00	Tokpa 22'; Romaric 26'; Né 65'	Report	Zarn 56'	Attendance: 2,590; Referee: Raivo Lattik (Estonia)

26 August 2004 Second leg	Vaduz (Liechtenstein)	1–2	(Belgium) Beveren	Rheinpark Stadion, Vaduz
19:00	Zarn 78'	Report	Djiré 32'; Romaric 56'	Attendance: 1,050; Referee: Novo Panić (Bosnia and Herzegovina)

Beveren won 5–2 on aggregate.

== Sources ==
- Switzerland Cup 2004–05 at RSSSF
- 1. Liga season 2004–05 at the official website
- Cup finals at Fussball-Schweiz
- Josef Zindel (2018). FC Basel 1893. Die ersten 125 Jahre (in German). Basel: Friedrich Reinhardt Verlag. ISBN 978-3-7245-2305-5.

Preceded by 2003–04	Seasons in Swiss football	Succeeded by 2005–06
