= 2004–05 Swiss Cup =

Tournament details
- Country: Switzerland

Final positions
- Champions: FC Zürich
- Runners-up: FC Luzern

Tournament statistics
- Top goal scorer: Alhassane Keita (6)

The 2004–05 Swiss Cup was the 80th season of Switzerland's annual cup competition. It began on 17 September with the first games of Round 1 and ended on 16 May 2005 with the Final held at St. Jakob-Park, Basel. The winners earned a place in the second qualifying round of the UEFA Cup.

== Overview ==
In this season's cup competition all the professional clubs joined in the first round. The first round of this season's cup competition started on 17, 18 and 19 September and ended on 16 May 2005 with the final, that was held at St. Jakob-Park in Basel.

== Round 1 ==
The first-tier teams were seeded in this first round and cound not be drawn against each other. The draw respected regionalities, when possible, and the lower classed team was granted home advantage.

=== Summary ===
Team 1	Score	Team 2
17 September 2004
FC Martigny-Sports	0–6	BSC Young Boys
FC Porrentruy	1–3	FC Concordia Basel
FC Schötz	1–4 (a.e.t.)	FC Baden
FC Kickers Luzern	1–4	FC Zürich
FC Signal	0–3	FC Meyrin
18 September 2004
FC Saint-Imier	2–5	FC La Chaux-de-Fonds
FC Epalinges	2–4	Yverdon-Sport FC
FC Collex-Bossy	0–3	FC Baulmes
FC Lausanne-Sport	1–2	Neuchâtel Xamax
FC Konolfingen	0–4	FC Sion
FC Biel-Bienne	0–2	FC Thun
FC Visp	0–1	FC Bex
FC Sierre	1–1 (a.e.t.) (p. 2–4)	FC Massongex
FC Muri	2–2 (a.e.t.) (p. 3–5)	FC Wohlen
FC Niedergösgen	0–9	FC Aarau
FC Oberdorf	0–4	FC Basel
FC Grenchen	1–3	SC Zofingen
FC Luterbach	2–1	FC Laufen
Inter Club Zurigo	0–7	Grasshoppers
FC Küssnacht a/R	1–2	SC YF Juventus
SC Cham	2-4	SC Kriens
Zug 94	0–2	FC Luzern
FC Affoltern	1–5	FC Winterthur
FC Wolhusen	2–1	FC Uster
FC Bazenheid	0–1 (a.e.t.)	AC Lugano
FC Altstätten	1–4	AC Bellinzona
FC Goldach	0–3	FC Chiasso
SC Brühl	2–4	FC Schaffhausen
FC Herisau	2–1	FC Wil 1900
19 September 2004
US Arbedo	1–3	FC St. Gallen
FC Stade Nyonnais	1–2	Servette FC
ES Belfaux	1–4	FC Bulle

=== Matches ===
17 September 2004

FC Martigny-Sports	0–6	Young Boys
Raczynski (yellow card) 28'	YB summary	10' (0:1) Maksimović; 30' (0:2) Chapuisat; 67' (0:3) Maksimović; 72' (0:4) Rochat; 88' (0:5) Chapuisat; 89' (0:6) Roman Friedli

Stade d'Octodure, Martigny
Attendance: 1,150
Referee: (Switzerland) Philippe Leuba (Chexbres)

During the 2004/05 season, FC Martigny-Sports played in the Swiss 1. Liga (Group 1). At that time, the 1. Liga served as the third tier of the Swiss football league system.

17 September 2004
19:30

FC Kickers Luzern	1–4	Zürich
(Capria) 18' (o.g.); Ribeiro (yellow card) 55'	FCZ summary SFV summary	16' (0:1) Capria; 65' (1:2) Di Jorio; (yellow card) 73' Buess; (yellow card) 75' Di Jorio; 78' (1:3) Tarone; 84' (1:4) Keita

Stadion Auf Tribschen, Lucerne
Attendance: 1,800
Referee: (Switzerland) Massimo Busacca (Monte Carasso/Bellinzona)

In the 2004/05 season, Kickers Luzern played in the 2. Liga interregional (at that time the fourth-highest tier in the Swiss football system).

18 September 2004
16:15

FC Niedergösgen	0–9	Aarau
	FCA summary	6' (0:1) Beqiri; 20' (0:2) Bieli; 34' (0:3) Bieli; 40' (0:4) Giallanza; 65' (0:5) Dugić; 68' (0:6) Giallanza; 73' (0:7) Giallanza; 82' (8:0) Beqiri; 87' (0:9) Dugić

Inseli, Niedergösgen
Attendance: 2,100
Referee: (Switzerland) Thomas Meier

During the 2004/05 season, FC Niedergösgen played in the 2. Liga interregional (Group 4), the fourth tier of Swiss football at the time.

18 September 2004
17:00

FC Oberdorf	0–4	Basel
	FCB summary	3' (0:1) Rossi; 23' (0:2) Rossi; 69' (0:3) Sterjovski; 69' (0:4) D. Degen

z' Hof, Oberdorf
Attendance: 5,100 (stadium record)
temporory stands were built
Referee: (Switzerland) Martin Salm (Veltheim, Aargau)

FC Oberdorf played the 2004/05 season in the 2. Liga regional (fifth-tier). Oberdorf without Mundschin (injured). FCB without Carignano, Chipperfield and Delgado (all injured), Ergic (longterm illness), as well as Huggel, Murat Yakin and Zuberbühler (all rested). 13th minute, a shot from Rossi hit the outside of the post. 26th minute, a shot from Rossi hit the inside of the post. 80th minute: Smilanic headed the ball against the crossbar.

== Round 2 ==
Teams from Super League were seeded in this round and could not play against each other. In a match, the home advantage was granted to the team from the lower league, if applicable.

=== Summary ===
Team 1	Score	Team 2
22 October 2004
SC Kriens	3–4 (a.e.t.)	SC YF Juventus
23 October 2004
FC Luterbach	0–7	Neuchâtel Xamax FC
FC Massongex	0–8	FC Thun
FC Sion	4–2	Servette FC
FC Wohlen	0–1	BSC Young Boys
FC Baulmes	1–0	FC La Chaux-de-Fonds
AC Lugano	1–1 (a.e.t.) (p. 8–9)	FC Aarau
FC Winterthur	1–3	FC Luzern
FC Wolhusen	1–3	FC Chiasso
24 October 2004
FC Meyrin	1–3	FC Basel
FC Bex	1–7	FC Concordia Basel
FC Bulle	0–4	Yverdon-Sport FC
SC Zofingen	1–5	FC Schaffhausen
FC Baden	1–5 (a.e.t.)	FC St.Gallen
FC Herisau	2–7	FC Zürich
AC Bellinzona	2–2 (a.e.t.) (p. 4–3)	Grasshoppers

=== Matches ===
23 October 2004

FC Wohlen	0–1	Young Boys
Markovic (yellow card) 69'; Sant´Anna (yellow card) 83'	summary	52' (0:1) Rochat; (yellow card) 62' Roman Friedli; (yellow card) 80' Urdaneta; (yellow card) 90' Melunović

Stadion Niedermatten, Wohlen
Attendance: 2,600
Referee: (Switzerland) Carlo Bertolini (Vira-Gambarogno)

In the 2004/05 season, FC Wohlen played in the Swiss Challenge League, the second-highest tier of Swiss football. YB without Sermeter (was ill), as well as De Napoli, Neri, J. Berisha, and Coubageat (all injured). In the 64th minute, Wölfli was substituted off after gettiing a knock.

23 October 2004
15:30

Lugano	1–1 (a.e.t.)	Aarau
Bugnard 68' (pen. 1:1); Viola (yellow card) 76'; Bugnard (yellow card) 111'; Immersi (yellow card) 120'	FCA summary	55' (0:1) Bättig; (yellow card) 66' Vanetta; (yellow card) 80' Beqiri; (yellow card) 120+1' Colomba
Penalties
Bugnard (penalty missed); Mollard (penalty missed); Miccolis (penalty scored); Botta (penalty scored); Viola (penalty scored); Rota (penalty scored); Weber (penalty scored); Immersi (penalty scored); Jelmorini (penalty scored); Penzavalli (penalty missed); Cataldo (penalty missed)	7–8	(penalty scored) Beqiri; (penalty scored) Opango; (penalty missed) Giallanza; (penalty missed) Simo; (penalty scored) Christ; (penalty scored) Vanetta; (penalty scored) Bättig; (penalty scored) Bieli; (penalty scored) Vardanyan; (penalty missed) Varela; (penalty scored) Colomba

Cornaredo, Lugano
Attendance: 880
Referee: (Switzerland) Guido Wildhaber (Kerzers)

During the 2004/05 season, Lugano played in the Swiss Challenge League, the second tier of Swiss football.

24 October 2004
15:30

Meyrin	1–3	Basel
Njanke (yellow card) 35'; Petrini 45' (1:1); Diouf (yellow card) 82'	FCB summary	11' (0:1) Rossi; 69' (1:2) Giménez; 76' (1:3) Giménez

Stade de Bois-Carré, Meyrin
Attendance: 3,145 (record attendance)
temporory stands were built
Referee: (Switzerland) Jérôme Laperrière (Kerzers)

During the 2004/05 season, FC Meyrin played in the Swiss Challenge League, the second tier of Swiss football. Meyrin without Ansah (absent), as well as Gil, Wohlschlag and N'Togué (all injured); FCB without Yakin (injured) and Ergic (longterm illness). 29th minute, Delgado was substitued out due to an injury.

24 October 2004
14:30

FC Herisau	2–7	Zürich
Golem (yellow card) 24'; Blazanovic 51' (1:4); Caliano 63' (2:5); Obrenovic (yellow card) 69'; Lapcevic (yellow card) 70'; Gambino (yellow card) 84'	FCZ summary SFL summary	11' (0:1) Petrosyan; 16' (0:2) Ilie; 18' (pen.) Tarone; 34' (0:4) Di Jorio; 62' (1:5) Ilie; 79' (2:6) Ilie; 83' (2:7) Ilie; (yellow card) 84' César

Ebnet, Herisau
Attendance: 2,400
Referee: (Switzerland) Nicole Petignat (Courgenay)

In the 2004/05 season, FC Herisau played in the 1. Liga (Group 3), which was the third-highest tier of Swiss football at the time.

== Round 3 ==
The ties were drawn, there was no seeding, everyone could meet everyone. The home advantage was granted to the team from the lower league, otherwise to the team that drawn first.

=== Summary ===
Team 1	Score	Team 2
20 November 2004
FC Baulmes	0–2	FC Aarau
FC Chiasso	1–0	Yverdon-Sport FC
FC Sion	1–2	BSC Young Boys
FC Thun	1–1 (a.e.t.) (p. 4–3)	FC Basel
21 November 2004
SC YF Juventus	0–2	AC Bellinzona
FC Luzern	4–1	FC Concordia Basel
Neuchâtel Xamax FC	0–2	FC Zürich
FC Schaffhausen	2–2 (a.e.t.) (p. 3–5)	FC St.Gallen

=== Matches ===
20 November 2005
16:15

FC Baulmes	0–2	Aarau
R. Cottens (yellow card) 61'; C. Cottens (yellow card) 67'	FCA summary	9' (0:1) Bieli; 11' (0:2) Vanetta; (yellow card) 67' Schenker; (yellow card) 90+1' Vardanyan; (yellow card) 90+2' Paulinho

Stade Sous-Ville, Baulmes
Attendance: 1,550
Referee: (Switzerland) Cyril Zimmermann (Bolligen)

In the 2004/05 season, FC Baulmes played in the Swiss Challenge League (the second-highest tier of Swiss football).

20 November 2005
17:30

Sion	1–2	Young Boys
Regazzoni (yellow card) 23'; Delgado (yellow card) 40'; Gaspoz 85' (1:2)	summary	42' (0:1) Neri; 70' (0:2) Häberli; (yellow card) 80' Joël Magnin

Stade Tourbillon, Sion
Attendance: 16,100
Referee: (Switzerland) Urs Meier (Wettingen and Würenlos)

In the 2004/05 season, Sion played in the Swiss Challenge League (the second-highest tier of Swiss football). Sion without Leandro (recovering) and Meoli (was ill), while YB without Carreño (suspended) as well as Eugster, Coubageat, Berisha, Wölfli, Maksimovic and Urdaneta (all injured). In the 44th minute, a shot by Bühler hit the post. In the 82nd minute, a goal by Thurre was disallowed due to offside.

20 November 2004
17:30

Thun	1–1 (a.e.t.)	Basel
Raimondi 57' (1:0); Hodžić (yellow card) 98'	FCB summary	(yellow card) 42' D. Degen; 67' (1:1) Rossi; (yellow card) 90' P. Degen
Penalties
Zanni (penalty scored); Renggli (penalty scored); Carlos (penalty scored); Raimondi (penalty missed); Baykal (penalty scored)	4–3	(penalty scored) Giménez; (penalty missed) Smiljanić; (penalty scored) Rossi; (penalty scored) Carignano; (penalty missed) Sterjovski

Stadion Lachen, Thun
Attendance: 5,000
Referee: (Switzerland) Nicole Petignat (Courgenay)

Thun without Lustrinelli and Sinani (both injured) and Milicevic (recovering). FCB without Petric, Yakin and Mesbah (all injured), Huggel (suspended), and Ergic (recovering). 93rd minute, a shot by Gimenez hit the crossbar.

21 November 2005
14:30

Xamax	0–2	Zürich
von Bergen (yellow card) 18'; M'Futi (yellow card) 57'; Soufiani (yellow card) 67'; Maraninchi (yellow card) 83'; Ielsch (yellow card) 90+1'	FCZ summary SFL summary	(yellow card) 3' Di Jorio; (yellow card) 18' Nef; 36' (0:1) Keita; (yellow card) 67' Gygax; 90+2' (pen.) César

Stade Charrière, La Chaux-de-Fonds
Attendance: 2,100
Referee: (Switzerland) Massimo Busacca (Monte Carasso/Bellinzona)

== Quarter-finals ==
The ties were drawn, there was no seeding, everyone could meet everyone. The home advantage was granted to the team that drawn first.

=== Summary ===
Team 1	Score	Team 2
13 February 2005
FC Chiasso	0–4	Luzern
Young Boys	2–0	Thun
St. Gallen	3–3 (a.e.t.) (p. 3–4)	Aarau
Bellinzona	0–2	Zürich

=== Matches ===
13 February 2005
14:30 CET

FC Chiasso	0–4	FC Luzern
Arnold (yellow card) 32'; Saviozzi (yellow card) 76'	SFL summary	37' Vogt; 39' (pen.) Tchouga; 63' (0:3) Tchouga; 78' Castillo

Stadio Comunale, Chiasso
Attendance: 3,000
Referee: (Switzerland) Markus Nobs (Wohlen bei Bern)

FC Chiasso and FC Luzern both played in the Swiss Challenge League (the second tier of Swiss football) during the 2004/05 season.

13 February 2005
14:30 CET

Young Boys	2–0	Thun
Neri 52' (1:0); Neri 90' (2:0)	SFL summary YB summary

Stadion Neufeld, Bern
Attendance: 8,415
Referee: (Switzerland) Philippe Leuba (Chexbres)

The Young Boys played their home games in the Stadion Neufeld after the Wankdorf Stadium was demolished in 2001 and the new Stadion Wankdorf was constructed on the same site. YB without Friedli, Berisha, and Aziawonou (all injured). Thun without Sinani and Schenkel (both injured). 44th minute: A goal by Neri is disallowed due to a preceding foul.

13 February 2005
14:30 CET

St. Gallen	3–3 (a.e.t.)	Aarau
Tachie-Mensah 5', 67'; Merenda 107'	FCA summary SFL summary	3' Vanetta; 57' Beqiri; 106' Fejzulahi
Penalties
Zellweger (penalty scored); Imhof (penalty missed); Schicker (penalty scored); Tachie-Mensah (penalty scored); Lopez (penalty missed)	3–4	(penalty scored) Beqiri; (penalty scored) Vanetta; (penalty scored) Opango; (penalty scored) Fejzulahi

Espenmoos, St. Gallen
Attendance: 7,000
Referee: (Switzerland) René Rogalla (Wallisellen)

13 February 2005
14:30

AC Bellinzona	0–2	Zürich
Melosi (yellow card) 47'; Cesaretti (yellow card) 75'; Grossi (yellow card) 85'	FCZ summary SFL summary	(yellow card) 5' Schneider; 15' (o.g.) (Bell); 41' (0:2) Keita; (yellow card) 57' Ilie; (yellow card) 88' Nef

Stadio Comunale, Bellinzona
Attendance: 4,000
Referee: (Switzerland) Guido Wildhaber (Kerzers)

In the 2004/05 season, AC Bellinzona played in the Swiss Challenge League (the second-highest tier of Swiss football).

== Semi-finals ==
The ties were drawn, there was no seeding, everyone could meet everyone. The home advantage was granted to the team that drawn first.

=== Summary ===
Team 1	Score	Team 2
14 April and 20 April 2005
Aarau	1–2	Luzern
Zürich	3–1	Young Boys

=== Matches ===
14 April 2005
20:15 CEST

FC Aarau	1–2	FC Luzern
Bieli 3'	FCA summary SFL summary	24' Vogt; 30' Sucic

Stadion Brügglifeld, Aarau
Attendance: 9,250
Referee: (Switzerland) Jérôme Laperrière (Kerzers)

20 April 2005
20:15

Zürich	3–1	BSC Young Boys
Filipescu (yellow card) 13'; Tararache (yellow card) 38'; Džemaili (yellow card) 44'; Gygax 48'; Keita 70' (2:0); Keita 86' (3:1)	FCZ summary SFL summary	(yellow card) 19' Rochat; (yellow card) 22' Carreño; (yellow card) 50' Disler; (yellow card) 56' de Napoli; 75' Urdaneta; (yellow card) 77' Urdaneta

Letzigrund, Zürich
Attendance: 9,800
Referee: (Switzerland) Claudio Circhetta (Muttenz)

FCZ without Cesar and Ilie (both suspended), Capria, Stanic, Petrosyan, Hohl and Akhalaia (all injured). YB without Coubageat, Eugster and Friedli (all injured), as well as Berisha and Aziawonou (both U-21).

== Final ==
The game was played in the St. Jakob-Park Basel. The advantage of the home team was granted to the team that won semi-final number one.

=== Summary ===
Team 1	Score	Team 2
16 May 2005
Luzern	1–3	Zürich

=== Telegram ===
16 May 2005
15:00

Luzern	1–3	Zürich
Andreoli (yellow card) 22'; Andreoli 87'	FCZ summary SFL summary	(yellow card) 19' Tararache; 19' Schneider; 62' Keita; (yellow card) 67' César; 74' Tararache

St. Jakob-Park, Basel
Attendance: 33,433 (sold out)
Referee: (Switzerland) Philippe Leuba (Chexbres)

24th minute, FCL midfielder Pirmin Schwegler substituted out injured. 29th minute, FCZ defender Alain Nef substituted out injured.

GK	(Switzerland) David Zibung
DF	(Switzerland) Christian Schwegler
DF	(Switzerland) Pascal Castillo
DF	(Switzerland) Genc Mehmeti
MF	(Switzerland) Ronny Hodel
MF	(Croatia) Marko Sucic		(substituted off) 69'
MF	(Switzerland) Pirmin Schwegler		(substituted off) 24'
MF	(Brazil) Ratinho		(substituted off) 58'
MF	(Italy) David Andreoli	(yellow card) 22'
ST	(Cameroon) Jean-Michel Tchouga
ST	(Brazil) Paulo Vogt
Substitutes:
DF	(Switzerland) Michael Diethelm		(substituted on) 24'
MF	(Liberia) Alsény Këïta		(substituted on) 58'
DF	(Switzerland) André Niederhäuser		(substituted on) 69'
Manager:
(Netherlands) René van Eck

GK	(Switzerland) Davide Taini
DF	(Switzerland) Alain Nef		(substituted off) 29'
DF	(Romania) Iulian Filipescu
DF	(Switzerland) Florian Stahel
DF	(Switzerland) Marc Schneider
MF	(Switzerland) Blerim Džemaili		(substituted off) 80'
MF	(Romania) Mihai Tararache	(yellow card) 19'
MF	(Switzerland) Daniel Gygax
MF	(Switzerland) Xavier Margairaz
MF	(Switzerland) Francesco Di Jorio		(substituted off) 80'
ST	(Guinea) Alhassane Keita
Substitutes:
MF	(Brazil) Cesar	(yellow card) 67'	(substituted on) 29'
MF	(Switzerland) Daniel Tarone		(substituted on) 80'
ST	(Romania) Adrian Ilie		(substituted on) 80'
Manager:
(Switzerland) Lucien Favre

FCZ won the cup and qualified for the 2005–06 UEFA Cup second qualifying round. This was FCZ's seventh cup win to this date.

== Further in Swiss football ==
- 2004–05 Swiss Super League
- 2004–05 Swiss Challenge League
- 2004–05 Swiss 1. Liga
