= 2004–05 Swiss Super League =

108th season of top-tier Swiss football

Swiss Super League
- Season: 2004–05
- Champions: Basel; 11th title
- Relegated: Servette
- Champions League: Basel; Thun
- UEFA Cup: Grasshopper; Zurich (via Swiss Cup)
- Intertoto Cup: Young Boys; Neuchâtel Xamax
- Matches: 170
- Goals: 505 (2.97 per match)
- Top goalscorer: Christian Giménez (27)

The 2004–05 Swiss Super League was the 108th season of top-tier football in Switzerland. The competition was officially named AXPO Super League due to sponsoring purposes. It began on 17 July 2004 and has ended on 29 May 2005. This second season as Swiss Super League.

== Overview ==
The Swiss Super League season 2004–05 was originally contested by ten teams. On 4 February 2005 the parent company of Servette FC was declared bankrupt. As a consequence of the bankruptcy Servette FC had their license revoked. The eighteen results from the team's first half of the season remained in the league table. The club's second half matches were cancelled entirely and so the second half of the season was competed with only nine clubs. These each played another double round-robin schedule. Each of the nine clubs had played 34 matches at the end of the season. Servettes parent company had run up debts of over 10 million Swiss francs and had not paid the players wages since the previous November. FC Servette were subsequently demoted to the Second Tier. The championship was won by FC Basel.

== League table ==
| Pos | Team | Pld | W | D | L | GF | GA | GD | Pts | Qualification or relegation |
|---|---|---|---|---|---|---|---|---|---|---|
| 1 | Basel (C) | 34 | 21 | 7 | 6 | 81 | 45 | +36 | 70 | Qualification to Champions League third qualifying round |
| 2 | Thun | 34 | 18 | 6 | 10 | 69 | 42 | +27 | 60 | Qualification to Champions League second qualifying round |
| 3 | Grasshopper | 34 | 12 | 14 | 8 | 51 | 50 | +1 | 50 | Qualification to UEFA Cup second qualifying round |
| 4 | Young Boys | 34 | 12 | 13 | 9 | 60 | 52 | +8 | 49 | Qualification to Intertoto Cup second round |
| 5 | Zürich | 34 | 13 | 9 | 12 | 55 | 57 | −2 | 48 | Qualification to UEFA Cup second qualifying round (Note: via 2004–05 Swiss Cup) |
| 6 | Neuchâtel Xamax | 34 | 10 | 8 | 16 | 36 | 48 | −12 | 38 | Qualification to Intertoto Cup first round |
| 7 | St. Gallen | 34 | 8 | 12 | 14 | 51 | 60 | −9 | 36 | |
| 8 | Aarau | 34 | 7 | 11 | 16 | 42 | 64 | −22 | 32 | |
| 9 | Schaffhausen (O) | 34 | 7 | 11 | 16 | 36 | 59 | −23 | 32 | Qualification to relegation play-off |
| 10 | Servette (Note: Servette were docked three points for financial irregularities.) (R, R) | 18 | 6 | 5 | 7 | 24 | 28 | −4 | 20 | Not admitted to Swiss Challenge League and withdrew (Note: Servette was forced to withdraw from the championship at the end of the first round of the season and demoted to the Second Division.) |

Source: RSSSF
Rules for classification: 1) points; 2) goal difference; 3) number of goals scored.
(C) Champions; (O) Play-off winners; (R) Relegated

== Results ==
=== First half of season ===
| Home \ Away | AAR | BAS | GCZ | NEU | SHA | SER | STG | THU | YB | ZÜR |
|---|---|---|---|---|---|---|---|---|---|---|
| Aarau | | 1–0 | 1–2 | 0–0 | 2–1 | 4–0 | 4–1 | 0–1 | 1–3 | 3–1 |
| Basel | 6–0 | | 8–1 | 1–1 | 1–1 | 2–1 | 1–0 | 3–3 | 2–1 | 2–1 |
| Grasshopper | 1–1 | 2–3 | | 2–1 | 1–0 | 0–2 | 0–0 | 0–0 | 0–1 | 1–1 |
| Neuchâtel Xamax | 2–1 | 1–2 | 2–0 | | 1–0 | 3–0 | 3–0 | 0–2 | 3–1 | 1–1 |
| Schaffhausen | 3–3 | 1–0 | 1–2 | 1–1 | | 1–4 | 3–2 | 0–1 | 1–1 | 2–1 |
| Servette | 1–0 | 1–2 | 2–2 | 1–2 | 1–1 | | 1–1 | 3–1 | 2–1 | 2–1 |
| St. Gallen | 2–1 | 0–1 | 0–0 | 4–2 | 2–2 | 1–1 | | 3–1 | 3–3 | 1–2 |
| Thun | 0–0 | 4–1 | 0–1 | 3–0 | 2–1 | 3–0 | 1–1 | | 3–1 | 0–1 |
| Young Boys | 1–1 | 1–1 | 1–1 | 2–1 | 6–1 | 1–1 | 0–1 | 2–1 | | 2–4 |
| Zürich | 1–3 | 0–0 | 2–0 | 1–2 | 1–1 | 2–1 | 3–1 | 1–0 | 2–3 | |

Legend: Blue = home team win; Yellow = draw; Red = away team win.

=== Second half of season ===
| Home \ Away | AAR | BAS | GCZ | NX | SHA | STG | THU | YB | ZÜR |
|---|---|---|---|---|---|---|---|---|---|
| Aarau | | 0–5 | 2–3 | 1–2 | 0–1 | 3–1 | 1–7 | 1–1 | 2–3 |
| Basel | 4–2 | | 4–1 | 2–0 | 4–3 | 3–1 | 4–1 | 1–1 | 3–2 |
| Grasshopper | 1–1 | 4–1 | | 1–1 | 3–1 | 4–0 | 1–0 | 1–1 | 1–1 |
| Neuchâtel Xamax | 1–1 | 0–4 | 1–2 | | 0–1 | 2–1 | 0–0 | 0–1 | 1–2 |
| Schaffhausen | 1–1 | 0–2 | 2–2 | 2–1 | | 0–0 | 0–1 | 0–1 | 2–1 |
| St. Gallen | 0–0 | 3–1 | 3–3 | 5–0 | 1–1 | | 1–2 | 2–2 | 4–5 |
| Thun | 5–0 | 3–0 | 2–5 | 2–1 | 4–0 | 3–1 | | 1–1 | 5–1 |
| Young Boys | 1–1 | 2–5 | 3–2 | 1–0 | 4–1 | 2–3 | 2–4 | | 1–1 |
| Zürich | 2–0 | 2–2 | 1–1 | 0–0 | 2–0 | 0–2 | 6–3 | 0–5 | |

Legend: Blue = home team win; Yellow = draw; Red = away team win.

== Relegation play-offs ==
1 June 2005
19:30 CEST

| Schaffhausen | 1–1 | Vaduz |
|---|---|---|
| dos Santos 8' | | Zarn 78' |

Stadion Breite, Schaffhausen
Attendance: 4,000
Referee: Massimo Busacca

12 June 2005
16:15 CEST

| Vaduz | 0–1 | Schaffhausen |
|---|---|---|
| | | Senn 73' |

Rheinpark Stadion, Vaduz
Attendance: 5,066
Referee: Philippe Leuba

Schaffhausen won 2–1 on aggregate.

== Season statistics ==
=== Top goalscorers ===
| Rank | Player | Club | Goals |
|---|---|---|---|
| 1 | (Argentina) Christian Giménez | FC Basel | 27 |
| 2 | (Switzerland) Mauro Lustrinelli | FC Thun | 20 |
| 3 | (Switzerland) Stéphane Chapuisat | BSC Young Boys | 15 |
| 4 | (Brazil) Francisco Neri | BSC Young Boys | 13 |
| 5 | (Switzerland) Thomas Häberli | BSC Young Boys | 12 |
| 6 | (Argentina) Matías Delgado | FC Basel | 11 |
| 6 | (Guinea) Alhassane Keita | FC Zurich | 11 |
| 6 | (Brazil) Gelson Rodrigues | FC Thun | 11 |
| 9 | (Switzerland) Mobulu M'Futi | Neuchâtel Xamax | 10 |

== Attendances ==
| # | Club | Average |
|---|---|---|
| 1 | Basel | 24,928 |
| 2 | Zürich | 8,794 |
| 3 | Servette | 8,587 |
| 4 | St. Gallen | 8,265 |
| 5 | Young Boys | 7,385 |
| 6 | GCZ | 7,024 |
| 7 | Thun | 5,242 |
| 8 | Aarau | 5,091 |
| 9 | Xamax | 4,353 |
| 10 | Schaffhausen | 3,515 |
