= Mihai Tararache =

Romanian footballer

Personal information
- Date of birth: 25 October 1977 (age 49)
- Place of birth: București, Romania
- Height: 1.80 m (5 ft 11 in)
- Position: Defensive midfielder

Youth career
- 1986–1993: Dinamo București

Senior career*
Years	Team	Apps	(Gls)
1993–1994	Gloria Bistrița	7	(0)
1994–1998	Dinamo București	87	(7)
1998–2004	Grasshoppers	157	(5)
2004–2006	FC Zürich	44	(2)
2006–2011	MSV Duisburg	103	(10)
Total		398	(24)

International career
2001–2005	Romania	4	(0)
- * Club domestic league appearances and goals

Mihai Tararache (born 25 October 1977) is a Romanian former professional footballer who played as a defensive midfielder for Gloria Bistriţa, Dinamo București, Grasshoppers, FC Zürich, and MSV Duisburg.

== International career ==
Tararache played four matches for Romania, making his debut when he came as a substitute and replaced Dorinel Munteanu in the 57th minute of a friendly which ended 2–2 against Slovenia. His following game was also a friendly, a 3–0 victory against Georgia, and the last two games were a 1–1 against Armenia and a 2–0 victory against Andorra at the 2006 FIFA World Cup qualifiers.

== Honours ==
Gloria Bistrița

- Cupa României: 1993–94

Grasshoppers

- Swiss Championship: 2000–01, 2002–03

FC Zürich

- Swiss Super League: 2005–06
- Swiss Cup: 2004–05
