= Florian Stahel =

Swiss footballer (born 1985)

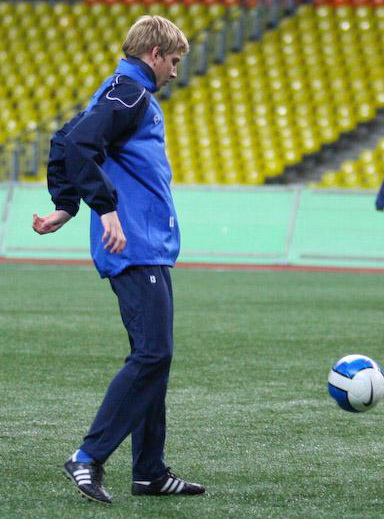

Personal information
- Full name: Florian Stahel
- Date of birth: 10 March 1985 (age 41)
- Place of birth: Switzerland
- Height: 1.84 m (6 ft 1/2 in)
- Position: Right back

Youth career
- FC Zurich

Senior career*
| Years | Team | Apps | (Gls) |
| 2004–2011 | FC Zürich | 180 | (7) |
| 2011–2014 | FC Luzern | 80 | (6) |
| 2014–2016 | FC Vaduz | 50 | (2) |
| 2016–2017 | FC Wohlen | 32 | (4) |
| 2017–2018 | FC Zürich U21 | 27 | (2) |
- * Club domestic league appearances and goals as of 23 September 2018

Florian Stahel (born 10 March 1985) is a retired footballer from Switzerland.

== Career ==
Stahel signed for FC Zurich playing against Grasshopper Zurich's youth academy and scoring an individual goal in a 2–6 loss.

In July 2016, he signed a two-year contract with FC Wohlen.

== Honours ==
FC Zürich

- Swiss Cup: 2004–05
- Super League/Nationalliga A: 2005–06, 2006–07, 2008–09
