= Julien Cordonnier =

French footballer (born 1980)

Personal information
- Full name: Julien Cordonnier
- Date of birth: June 27, 1980 (age 46)
- Place of birth: Chartres, France
- Height: 1.90 m (6 ft 3 in)
- Positions: Defender; defensive midfielder

Team information
- Current team: LB Châteauroux (chief-scout)

Senior career*
Years	Team	Apps	(Gls)
2000–2002	LB Châteauroux	30	(0)
2002–2004	AS Beauvais	32	(1)
2004–2006	Neuchâtel Xamax	53	(1)
2006–2008	Clermont Foot	29	(1)
2008–2011	LB Châteauroux	85	(7)
2011–2012	US Orléans	55	(2)

Managerial career
- 2013–2016: US Orléans (sporting director)
- 2018–2020: Saint-Étienne (scout)
- 2020–2021: Saint-Étienne (sporting director)
- 2021–: LB Châteauroux (chief-scout)
- * Club domestic league appearances and goals

Julien Cordonnier (born June 27, 1980 in Chartres) is a retired French professional football player.

== Later career ==
After retiring from football at the end of 2013 due to injuries, Cordonnier was appointed sporting director of US Orléans at the end of January 2013. He was fired at the end of 2016 due to the teams poor results.

At the end of February 2018, Cordonnier was hired as a scout at AS Saint-Étienne. On 5 March 2020, he got a new position as a sporting director of the club. On 7 May 2021, Cordonnier returned to his former club, LB Châteauroux, as a chief-scout.
