= Alain Nef =

Swiss footballer (born 1982)

Personal information
- Date of birth: 6 February 1982 (age 44)
- Place of birth: Wädenswil, Switzerland
- Height: 1.91 m (6 ft 3 in)
- Position: Defender

Youth career
- Wädenswil
- Zürich

Senior career*
Years	Team	Apps	(Gls)
2001–2006	Zürich	130	(10)
2006–2008	Piacenza	69	(5)
2008–2010	Udinese	3	(0)
2009	→ Recreativo (loan)	8	(0)
2009–2010	→ Triestina (loan)	35	(1)
2010–2013	Young Boys	91	(8)
2013–2019	Zürich	147	(9)

International career^{‡}
2008–2009	Switzerland	4	(1)
- * Club domestic league appearances and goals as of 10 June 2019 ‡ National team caps and goals as of 10 August 2012

Alain Nef (born 6 February 1982) is a retired Swiss football defender. He last played for FC Zürich.

== Career ==
Alain Nef played in the youth teams of Wädenswil and FC Zürich where he started his professional career in 2001. He won the Swiss Super League with Zürich in 2006. After that he moved to Piacenza Calcio. After two seasons with Piacenza he moved to Udinese Calcio in 2008. On 14 January 2009, Nef went on loan to Spanish club Recreativo de Huelva.

In summer 2009 he was loaned out to Italian Serie B side Triestina. He made his league debut for the club on 21 August 2009 in a 0–0 away draw with AC Mantova. He played all ninety minutes of the match. He scored his first league goal for the club just eight days later in a 1–0 home victory over Grosseto. His goal was scored in the 30th minute.

In November 2010, BSC Young Boys bought him outright and agreed a new contract which last until 30 June 2015. He made his league debut for the club on 12 September 2010 in a 2–2 home draw with FC Basel. He was subbed on in the 38th minute for Emiliano Dudar. He scored his first league goal for the club on 12 December 2010 in a 1–1 home draw with St. Gallen. His goal, scored in the 89th minute, made the score 1–1.

In July 2013, Nef was sold back to FC Zürich for €200,000. His first league appearance upon returning to the club came on 14 July 2013 in a 3–2 home victory over FC Thun. He played all ninety minutes of the match and picked up a yellow card in the 88th minute. He scored his first league goal upon returning to the club on 4 August 2013 in a 3–1 home defeat to his former club BSC Young Boys. His goal, scored in the 60th minute, made the score 2–1. With Zürich he won the Swiss Cup three times: in 2014, 2016 and 2018.

On 23 May 2019, Nef announced his retirement from professional football.

== International ==
He made his senior Switzerland international debut against Cyprus on 20 August 2008.

== Style of play ==
Nef played as a striker in his youth. After that, he played as a winger and then a defender. He lists his position as right-back and his main strength as ball control.

== Honors ==
=== Club ===
FC Zürich

- Super League: 2005–06
- Challenge League: 2016–17
- Swiss Cup (4): 2004–05, 2013–14, 2015–16, 2017–18
