= Giuseppe Rapisarda =

Swiss footballer (born 1985)

Personal information
- Date of birth: 6 September 1985 (age 41)
- Place of birth: Switzerland
- Height: 1.84 m (6 ft 0 in)
- Position: Defender

Senior career*
Years	Team	Apps	(Gls)
2004–2006	FC Zürich	11	(0)
2006–2007	FC Wohlen	23	(1)
2007–2011	FC Aarau	52	(5)
2011	FC Baden	6	(0)
2012	FC Chiasso	12	(1)
2012–	FC Wohlen		
- * Club domestic league appearances and goals as of 21 June 2012

Giuseppe Rapisarda (born 6 September 1985) is a Swiss football player. He currently plays for FC Wohlen.
