= Matías Emilio Delgado =

Argentine footballer

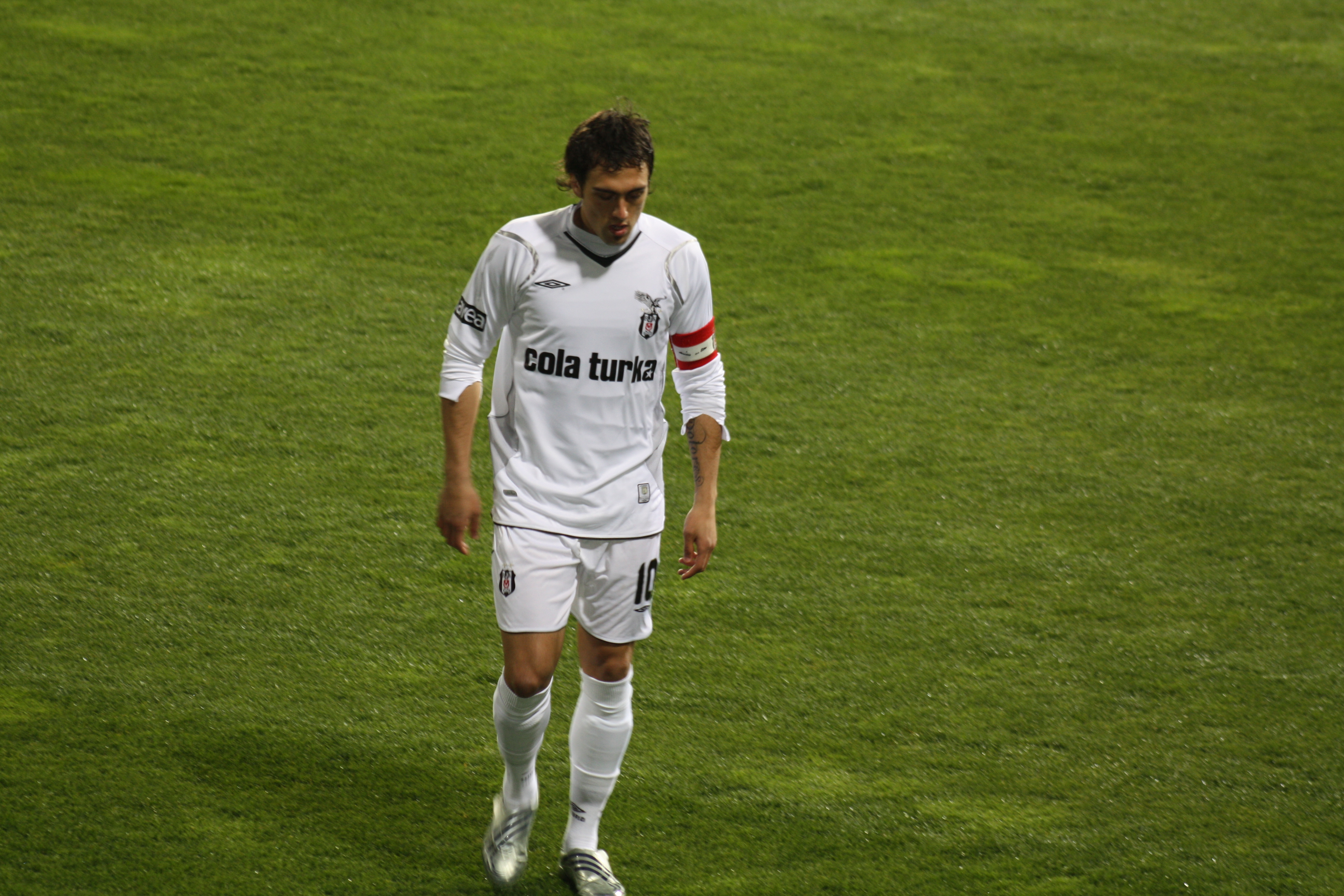

Personal information
- Full name: Matías Emilio Delgado
- Date of birth: 15 December 1982 (age 43)
- Place of birth: Rosario, Argentina
- Height: 1.82 m (5 ft 11 1/2 in)
- Position: Attacking midfielder

Youth career
- River Plate

Senior career*
| Years | Team | Apps | (Gls) |
| 2000–2003 | Chacarita | 52 | (5) |
| 2003–2006 | Basel | 85 | (31) |
| 2006–2010 | Beşiktaş | 83 | (18) |
| 2010–2013 | Al-Jazira | 64 | (14) |
| 2013–2017 | Basel | 108 | (31) |
| Total | | 392 | (99) |
- * Club domestic league appearances and goals as of 31 July 2017

Matías Emilio Delgado (born 15 December 1982) is a retired Argentine footballer who last played as an attacking midfielder for Swiss Super League Club FC Basel.

== Club career ==
Delgado, originally from Rosario, relocated to Buenos Aires with his family at the age of two when his father, the football player Eduardo Emilio Delgado, joined All Boys. Although he initially began his football journey in the renowned academy of River Plate, he transitioned to the Argentinos Juniors youth team in 1998.

=== Chacarita Juniors ===
Delgado made his professional debut with Chacarita Juniors in 2000 at the age of 17.

==== Season 2002–03 ====
His breakthrough performance came in the Torneo Apertura of the 2002–03 Argentine Primera División when he recorded a goal and an assist in the Round 8 loss to Independiente, which was followed by a superb curling effort that found the back of the net in the Round 13 loss to Boca Juniors. Ahead of the Torneo Clausura, Delgado was given the number 10 jersey after previously wearing number 11. This also marked a shift in his on-field position towards a more playmaking role in the centre of midfield for the latter half of the season, having primarily operated on the left wing before. One of his standout performances came in the Round 5 trashing of Huracán when he scored two goals while also being a constant threat to the opposition with his incisive passing in the final third and long-range shot attempts. He added one more goal in the Round 18 draw with Racing, bringing his total goal tally to five.

==== Season 2003–04 ====
Delgado started the 2003–04 season with Chacarita, featuring in three games. In Round 1, he provided a crucial assist with an exquisitely executed through ball to secure a crucial win against San Lorenzo. In Round 2, Delgado was instrumental in helping the team attain a draw versus Gimnasia, assisting for a 90th-minute equaliser. However, he soon left the club, sealing a move to Europe at the age of 20.

=== FC Basel ===
Delgado's performances in Argentine Primera División caught the eye of several European clubs, but it was the Swiss giants FC Basel that signed him on a four-year contract in August 2003 for a reported fee of 1.2 million Swiss francs, after their chief scout Ruedi Zbinden watched him live in Argentina on several occasions and invited him for a trial. He emerged as the club's marquee signing for the 2003–04 season, shouldering the weight of expectations to fill the void left by the departure of star player Hakan Yakin.

==== Season 2003–04 ====
Delgado made his debut with RotBlau at St. Jakob-Park on 3 September 2003 when he was brought on for Sébastien Barberis in the 68th minute. Just two minutes later, he played a decisive ball to Hervé Tum for the team's third goal as Basel beat St. Gallen 4–1 in Round 9 of the 2003–04 Swiss Super League. Despite a promising start, Basel's coach, Christian Gross, had often left Delgado on the substitutes' bench, aiming to better integrate him into the system before granting him more starting opportunities. Delgado scored his first goal for Basel on 2 October in the Round 12 away win against Neuchâtel Xamax, unleashing a powerful shot from the edge of the box following a cross from Scott Chipperfield. His exceptional performance in that game won him the hearts of the fans, who clamored for him to be a regular starter. The fans' sentiment did not go unnoticed by Gross, who decided to give Delgado more playing time from then on. Nonetheless, the dynamics between the player and the coach retained a challenging undertone, even though Delgado conceded the necessity of Gross's stringent approach in certain moments.

Delgado made his debut in European competitions on 24 September, playing full 90 minutes in the team's first leg victory against Malatyaspor in the first round of the 2003–04 UEFA Cup. Despite a solid start to his career in Switzerland, Delgado faced an unfortunate setback when an untimely injury caused him to miss some crucial matches, including the team's decisive games in the UEFA Cup and the Swiss Cup. The unexpected return of Hakan Yakin, whose contract with PSG was cancelled, also meant that he was deployed in a less attacking role than usual, which limited his offensive contribution. Delgado finished the season featuring in 20 league games and scoring twice in the process as Basel was crowned league champions.

==== Season 2004–05 ====
In the 2004–05 season, Delgado solidified his position in the first team, gradually seeing an increase in his playing time to complete 90 minutes on a regular basis during the latter half of the season. Following the departure of Hakan Yakin to VfB Stuttgart the previous winter, manager Christian Gross also granted him greater playing freedom, predominantly deploying him in a No. 10 role within the 4–4–2 diamond-wide formation. Delgado opened his goalscoring account for the season during Round 3 of the Swiss Super League 2004-05, contributing to the away triumph over Servette FC. Demonstrating his playmaking prowess, he followed it up in the subsequent round by providing two crucial assists that led to the team's 2–1 win against bitter rivals FC Zürich. The standout moment of the season happened during Round 8 when Basel delivered a resounding 8–1 victory over Grasshopper, with Delgado making a notable impact by contributing both a goal and an assist. However, his most exceptional performance came against another Swiss powerhouse, as he showcased his talent by scoring two goals and providing an assist in the Round 27 triumph over Young Boys. The second goal was particularly spectacular, as Delgado displayed his exceptional technique by volleying home a rebound from the edge of the box with both power and finesse. Basel concluded the season in triumphant fashion, clinching the Super League title. Delgado played a pivotal role in the team's success, finishing as their second-highest scorer with 11 goals in 32 league games, only behind Christian Gimenez, who netted 27 goals. Additionally, he showcased his playmaking abilities by providing 10 assists, which made him the league's joint second most influential contributor after his Basel teammate Julio Hernán Rossi with 12 passes that led to a goal.

Delgado also scored once in the 2004–05 UEFA Cup group stage when he showcased his exceptional free-kick prowess by curling a superbly taken set-piece into the net in the 82nd minute, securing the crucial equalizer in a 1–1 draw against FC Schalke.

==== Season 2005–06 ====
In the 2005–06 season, Delgado resumed his impressive form and wasted no time in making his impact felt, netting the decisive winning goal in the Swiss Super League 2005-06 Round 3 encounter with FC Zurich. This early success was just a glimpse of what was to come for Delgado in the 2005–06 season. In the Round 8 match against FC Aarau, he proved to be a dominant force on the pitch, scoring two goals and providing an assist in Basel's impressive 7–2 victory, a feat he would replicate in the following round against Xamax. Delgado's penchant for delivering standout performances in big games was evident once again in the Round 12 clash with FC Zurich when he rose to the occasion by scoring two goals and delivering two assists, contributing significantly to a crucial 4–2 win. Another memorable display came in the Round 18 encounter against Young Boys, where he orchestrated a dominant performance, showcasing his exceptional playmaking skills by providing an impressive three assists and netting a goal in a resounding 6–1 victory. Despite Basel falling short of clinching the league title in the final game of the season, Delgado experienced his most remarkable individual campaign, finding the back of the net 18 times in 33 league appearances. This achievement secured him a joint second-place finish in the league's scoring charts, with FC Zurich's Alhassane Keita surpassing him by two goals. In addition to his goalscoring exploits, the Argentine playmaker registered 12 assists throughout the season, placing him joint-top in the league. This adeptness at both scoring and assisting made him the most influential player in the Swiss Super League 2005-06 in terms of direct goal involvement. His outstanding performances were duly recognized, and he was honoured with the Swiss Super League Player of the Year award at the end of the season while previously being named the Super League's Most Exciting Player.

Delgado also left his mark in the 2005–06 Swiss Cup, scoring two goals against archrivals FC Zurich in the round of 16. Despite his efforts, Basel would ultimately suffer a narrow 3–4 defeat, resulting in their elimination from the tournament.

Delgado's exceptional individual performances extended beyond domestic competitions and resonated on the European stage, where he emerged as the top scorer of the 2005–06 UEFA Cup. His tally of 7 goals surpassed the likes of renowned stars, including Aleksandr Kerzhakov, Mark Viduka, Frederic Kanoute, and Javier Saviola. With an additional two assists to his name, Delgado firmly established himself as the single most influential performer of the tournament. He made a strong start to the competition by netting three goals in the home game against NK Široki Brijeg in the first qualifying round, which marked his first official hattrick. Delgado solidified his reputation as a lethal set-piece taker, contributing two of the three goals from impeccably executed free kicks. His fourth goal came from a calmly executed penalty kick during the group stage match against Red Star Belgrade. In the same game, Delgado demonstrated exceptional flair and vision in the dying minutes of the game, using a deft backheel pass on his first touch to send the ball through the legs of Milan Biševac and onto the path of Julio Hernán Rossi, who made no mistake in slotting it home, sealing a dramatic 2–1 triumph for the team. He added another goal to his tally in the next fixture as Basel rallied back to secure a remarkable 4–3 comeback against Tromso IL, overturning a 1–3 deficit. In the round of 16, Delgado demonstrated his prowess in big games by delivering a spectacular goal from a beautifully struck free kick and providing an assist, propelling Basel to a convincing 2–0 victory over RC Strasbourg, the team they had previously lost to by the same result in the group stage. His final goal in the 2005–06 UEFA Cup came in the quarter-final encounter with Middlesbrough F.C., where he unleashed a remarkable long-range effort to open the scoring and pave the way to a dominant 2–0 triumph. Unfortunately, Basel would face a setback in the return leg, suffering a 4–1 defeat and subsequently exiting the competition.

Despite not winning any silverware, Delgado finished the 2005–06 season with a personal record of 27 goals in 50 appearances across all competitions, along with a tally of 14 assists. His exceptional form caught the attention of numerous foreign clubs, fueling speculations that he might depart Basel for the prospect of playing in the UEFA Champions League.

=== Beşiktaş JK ===
Despite having extended his contract with Basel in January 2006, committing to stay with RotBlau until June 2008, Delgado's impressive achievements caught the attention of numerous foreign clubs, making his eventual departure inevitable. After amassing a record of 113 competitive games and 41 goals across all competitions during three seasons, the club decided to capitalize on the player's success. On 28 June 2006, Beşiktaş J.K. announced the signing of Matias Delgado for a fee of €5.5m (or 7.5m Swiss francs). This made the player the club's second most expensive acquisition (after Ayhan Akman's €6.5m transfer from Gaziantepspor in 1998) and FC Basel's record departure at the time (a record previously held by Timothée Atouba's €4.5m transfer to Tottenham in 2004). The transfer was notably influenced by the insistence of head coach Jean Tigana, who held a deep admiration for the player's exceptional qualities. Delgado was assigned the coveted number 10 jersey at Besiktas, and the media drew comparisons to fellow Argentine playmaker Juan Román Riquelme, who had excelled with Villarreal in the Champions League earlier that year.

==== Season 2006–07 ====
Delgado made his official debut with Black Eagles on June 30, playing the full 90 minutes in the Turkish Super Cup victory over arch-rivals Galatasaray at Deutsche Bank Park in Frankfurt. His first appearance in the Süper Lig took place in Round 1, during an away loss to Manisaspor. He was named in the starting lineup in the attacking midfielder role and played the full game. Delgado quickly solidified his position as a consistent first-team player, leaving an early impact in Round 3 of the 2006–07 Süper Lig with a goal and an assist in a 2–0 victory over Denizlispor. This great performance was carried on into the next round, which was marked with an assist to Burak Yilmaz to seal a 3–1 triumph over Konyaspor. However, Delgado's solid start to the season was soon disrupted by a string of unfortunate injuries, limiting his playing time to only four league games between early October and late January of the following year. He featured regularly again in the second half of the season but struggled to recapture his early form. Nonetheless, the Argentine playmaker still demonstrated glimpses of brilliance, like his superb match-winning goal in the final minutes against Ankaragücü in Round 24. Eventually, Delgado managed to regain his prowess later in the campaign, which began with a key assist to Ibrahim Toraman for a late equalizer against Sakaryaspor in Round 28. This was followed by a decisive goal to secure a victory over Antalyaspor in the subsequent round. Unfortunately, Delgado soon faced yet another injury setback, limiting his playing time in the final stretches of the season. With Besiktas finishing second and with only four goals and six assists in 26 games, the league campaign proved underwhelming for the player, marred by a series of sporadic injuries that hindered him from finding consistent form. In the first ten rounds, before the injuries took their toll, he played the full 90 minutes in eight games, whereas he featured in only three full games for the rest of the season.

Delgado was also off to a flying start in Turkish Cup. In the opening game of the group stage, he shone by scoring once through a beautifully executed free kick and providing an assist in a dominant 5–1 victory over Bucaspor. Despite missing the next two games due to a shoulder injury, Delgado made a triumphant return in the final group stage match against Ankaragücü, contributing a game-winning goal that secured a critical victory for the Black Eagles and propelled them into the knockout stage. After playing the full 90 minutes in both quarter-final games against Manisaspor, the Argentine playmaker maintained his impactful presence in the intense semi-final showdown against arch-rivals Fenerbahçe. He was a constant threat to the opposition with impressive long-range shooting, incisive passing, and skilful dribbling. His influence on the game was further highlighted by a crucial contribution – assisting Bobô for a game-winning goal in the first leg of the matchup. This would prove to be a decisive moment as Besiktas advanced to the finals after rescuing a 1–1 draw in the overtime of the return leg. Unfortunately, that marked the end of Delgado's campaign in the tournament due to Achilles tendon problems, and he was unable to participate in the finals against Kayseri, a match the Black Eagles won in extra time to be crowned cup champions.

Injury issues hindered Delgado from leaving his mark in European competitions, with only two appearances for the team in the 2006–07 UEFA Cup, a tournament in which he had been the top goalscorer the previous year. After making a single appearance in the qualifying round victory over CSKA Sofia, he played only one game in the group stage, marked with an assist for the team's only goal in a 2–1 away loss to Dinamo București.

==== Season 2007–08 ====
Delgado started the new season by playing the full 90 minutes in the Turkish Super Cup clash against Galatasaray, where Besiktas suffered a 2–1 defeat. Despite the loss, the Argentine showcased a diverse set of skills in this match, nearly finding the back of the net on two occasions. One notable attempt included a remarkable long-range effort that beat the goalkeeper but unfortunately struck the crossbar. The player also faced a slow start to the Süper Lig campaign, struggling to earn the trust of the new head coach and Besiktas legend Ertuğrul Sağlam, which led to a restricted playing time in the early rounds of the competition. However, as the season unfolded, Delgado's playing time saw a gradual increase, and he soon solidified his position as a regular starter. He left his mark on the competition during the Round 9 encounter with Trabzonspor, where he earned a penalty for the team and adeptly converted it to secure a 3–2 win. Two rounds later, he delivered a stellar assist, setting up Bobô for an early goal in the encounter with Fenerbahçe, but it was not sufficient for the team to avoid a narrow defeat. Delgado hit his stride as the season advanced, embarking on a three-game scoring spree, which commenced with a remarkable long-range effort that secured a draw against Rizespor in Round 14, followed by a crucial late winner against Bursaspor and a powerful long-distance strike in a comfortable victory over Ankaragücü. However, the highlight of the season came in the Round 26 showdown with Trabzonspor, as the Argentine maestro not only delivered an assist but also showcased his brilliance with a phenomenal free-kick goal. Despite his best effort, the precision of the strike left Tolga Zengin helpless and superbly curled into the far top corner in a moment of sheer excellence. Delgado concluded the season in remarkable fashion, netting a crucial goal in Round 31 for a comeback 2–1 victory over Rizespor before keeping cool composure and confidently converting a penalty in a 2–0 win against Ankaragücü in Round 33. In the final game of the competition, he showcased his playmaking prowess by providing two assists within a span of three minutes, contributing to the emphatic 5–1 triumph over Manisaspor. Delgado concluded the league campaign as the team's third-highest goalscorer, notching up eight goals, which placed him behind Bobô and Mert Nobre, who both secured ten goals each during the season. He also added five assists to this record.

In the Turkish Cup, Delgado was absent for the initial two games of the group stage but made a comeback for the final matches against Ankaraspor and Ankaragücü. He played a crucial role by providing an assist to Rodrigo Tello for the opening goal in the former, contributing to a commanding 3–1 victory that secured the team's qualification for the knockout stage. In the first leg of the quarter-finals loss to Rizespor, Delgado was not featured. However, he made a return for the second leg, providing an assist that secured a 3–2 win, but Besiktas was eliminated from the competition due to the away goal rule.

Delgado's prowess shone brightly in European competitions, propelling the Black Eagles to the UEFA Champions League. This marked a defining moment in his career as he stepped onto the grand stage of the prestigious club competition for the very first time. His impact was palpable in both games of the second qualifying round against Sherriff Tiraspol, where he notched a crucial assist in the return leg. However, Delgado saved the best for last, delivering a remarkable performance that nearly single-handedly led to the defeat of FC Zurich in the playoffs. The significance of the opponent was not lost on the player, considering his prior association with FC Basel. This added depth to his impactful performance and further solidified his reputation as someone who excels in crucial moments and big games. During the first leg of the encounter, he secured a lead for the team with a poacher's finish inside the box. However, victory would elude the Black Eagles as the opponents managed to equalize in the 97th minute. Undeterred by the setback, Delgado stepped up and showcased his mastery in the return leg with two well-executed headers, securing a 2–0 triumph and qualification to the group stage. During the group stage, Besiktas encountered formidable competition against renowned teams such as Liverpool, Olympique Marseille, and Porto. Despite securing two victories, the team faced four defeats, leading to an early exit from the tournament. Delgado played in all six games, delivering some notable performances. A standout moment occurred in the dying minutes of the home match against Marseille when his masterful pass connected with Bobô, who made no mistake in slotting it home to secure a 2–1 victory.

==== Season 2008–09 ====
The 2008–09 season proved fruitful for Delgado; however, it was marred by injuries that significantly limited his impact on the pitch. Before the start of the season, he was named the club's new captain, replacing the standard skipper İbrahim Üzülmez, who had been involved in a fight with the vice-captain, Ibrahim Toraman, resulting in both of them being stripped of their captaincy roles.

Delgado kicked off the 2008–09 Süper Lig season in stellar form, netting in consecutive matches to ignite the Black Eagles' league campaign. In the Round 1 clash against Antalyaspor, he orchestrated two golden opportunities for Filip Hološko in the early stages, but the Slovak winger failed to convert one-on-one situations with the goalkeeper. Undeterred, Delgado slammed home a powerful rebound in the second half, sparking a remarkable comeback from a 2–0 deficit. In the following round, the Argentine maestro showcased his brilliance once again, breaking the deadlock with a sublime long-range effort. Despite having a penalty saved by Jefferson later in the match, Delgado's standout performance helped secure a comfortable victory over Konyaspor, establishing himself as a key player on the pitch. Delgado adopted a more playmaking role during Rounds 6 and 7, impressing with his exceptional passing ability and vision. In the first fixture, he delivered a pivotal pass to Mert Nobre, securing a hard-fought 2–1 triumph over Hacettepe. In the subsequent match against Gençlerbirliği, he delivered a pinpoint corner kick, connecting perfectly with Tomáš Sivok, who headed home with precision as the Black Eagles soared to a commanding lead, finding the net three times within the opening 13 minutes of the encounter. Delgado carried his fine form into the next round, as his strike cancelled out Sivasspor's early lead. Despite his efforts, Besiktas could not secure a win as the scoreline held firm until the final whistle. In the thrilling Round 10 showdown against Kocaelispor, the Argentine maestro delivered his standout performance. With a goal and two assists, he was the focal point in the 5–2 scoring spectacle. After trailing by two goals in a span of two minutes, the Black Eagles orchestrated a remarkable comeback, led by Delgado's stellar display. He initiated the turnaround by delivering a pinpoint cross from a free kick to set up Mert Nobre, followed by a stunning long-range strike from the left-hand side that curled into the far top corner of the goal. Delgado wrapped up his phenomenal display by providing another assist for Nobre while he also came close to adding to his tally with a superb first touch to control a challenging cross inside the box but was unable to find the back of the net on that occasion. The Argentine playmaker also left his mark on the Round 16 showdown against arch-rivals Galatasaray, scoring an early equalizer. However, his impactful performance was cut short as he received a second yellow for asking the referee Cüneyt Çakır to show one to the opponent, a decision many commentators found too harsh. Unfortunately, the sending-off was just the beginning of Delgado's woes, as he endured cartilage damage as well. This not only halted his impressive form but also foreshadowed further injuries later in the season. Following a three-game absence due to injury, Delgado faced another setback with a strained calf, sidelining him for the Round 20 clash against Trabzonspor. Despite returning to score a spectacular long-range goal against Hacettepe in Round 23, his comeback was short-lived as he succumbed to yet another undisclosed injury. However, it was not long before he returned to action. Following a full 90-minute performance in the Round 29 fixture against Eskişehirspor and an assist in the clash with Ankaraspor two rounds later, it appeared that Delgado's troubles were finally behind him. Regrettably, Delgado's fortunes took a sharp turn when he suffered a severe groin injury that would keep him off the pitch for a very long time. This marked the end of the season for the Argentine maestro, whose solid start to the league campaign was cut short by a series of unfortunate injuries. Throughout the initial 16 fixtures, Delgado was a mainstay in the starting lineup, completing the full 90 minutes on eleven occasions and never being substituted before the 80th-minute mark. During this run of games, he notched 5 goals and provided 4 assists. However, his contributions were limited to one goal and a single assist in the remaining 18 fixtures, where he featured just 10 times, completing a full game only once and struggling to find consistent form. Nevertheless, despite his limited playing time, Delgado played a crucial role in Besiktas' league triumph, securing the championship title with a six-point lead over Trabzonspor. Although his statistics of 6 goals and 5 assists may not appear remarkable, his contributions made him one of the team's standout performers.

Due to several untimely injuries, Delgado was sidelined for all of Beşiktaş's group-stage games in the 2008–09 Turkish Cup and both quarter-final matches against Antalyaspor. He made his return only for the semi-final clash with Ankaraspor, where he played a pivotal role in helping the team secure a spot in the finals with two outstanding performances. In the first leg of the encounter, he broke the deadlock with a magnificent long-range strike, paving the way for a commanding 3–1 triumph. Despite Beşiktaş enduring a 2–1 loss in the return leg, with the Argentine maestro assisting Filip Hološko for the equalizer, the team still progressed to the finals. Unfortunately, a late-season groin injury sidelined Delgado, preventing him from helping the Black Eagles in the finals, where they clinched a magnificent 4–2 victory over their archrivals, Fenerbahçe.

==== Season 2009–10 ====
At the end of the season 2008/2009. Delgado sustained a hard groin injury. He underwent an operation in Barcelona and was expected to get well somewhere around the end of 2009 or the beginning of 2010, sometime around the month of December or January. At that time there was a great dilemma around Delgado's contract with the club. Delgado refused to have his contract suspended. Although, the club needed a number 10 player. Delgado was blocking a transfer option for Beşiktaş J.K. After a lot of thinking and discussing, including bringing in Delgado's father and manager Eduardo Delgado, they finally came to a conclusion. They had his contract frozen until January 2010. The fans say about the star player: We believe that it is not fair for the club to do this after the great performance he has been giving. He got injured playing for the team, not playing football on the beach. But we believe that he will reclaim his club shirt after he gets well. The club can buy a lot of new players but taking his number will be a hard thing to accomplish. By June 2010, Delgado started to train with Beşiktaş J.K. again.

==== Season 2010–11 ====
At the beginning of 2010/2011. season Delgado was in first eleven again captaining the team on four occasions and scoring four times in the process. But Beşiktaş J.K. was not satisfied with him and bringing in Guti to the club forced Delgado to leave.

=== Al Jazira ===
Delgado signed for Abu Dhabi-based club Al Jazira on 23 August 2010 for a fee estimated around €2.250.000 . He was given number 22 shirt. Since his arriving to the club he was almost ever present first eleven player. As usually, he played a playmaker role pulling strings in the midfield. In his first season at Mohammed bin Zayed Stadium he won UAE Pro-League and UAE Predsident's Cup scoring 8 times in 27 matches. Delgado continued with his great plays in the following 2011–12 season scoring 7 times on 28 occasions and club awarded him with a new 2 years contract extension. In that season club added another UAE President's Cup to its silverware and reached Round of 16 of AFC Champions League, but could not manage to retain UAE Pro-League title. In the season 2012/2013. Delgado once again displayed his fenomenal individual performances scoring 6 times in 32 matches while making plentiful of assists (and finishing some matches with a three or four assists). However, that did not satisfied Al Jazira which decided to terminate his contract at 10 June 2013.

=== Return to FC Basel ===
On 13 July 2013 Basel announced that they had successfully arranged the return of Delgado to the club. He played his first match after his return on 11 August 2013, as he was used as a sub in the 61st minute, against Zürich. At the end of the 2013–14 Super League season Delgado won his third league championship with Basel. Delgado scoring 2 goals and making 6 assists in 25 appearances. Basel also reached the final of the 2013–14 Swiss Cup, but were beaten 2–0 by Zürich after extra time. In Swiss Cup he scored once converting a penalty kick. In the 2013–14 Champions League season Basel in the group stage finished the group in third position to qualify for Europa League knockout phase and here they advanced as far as the quarter-finals. Delgado played all 6 games in the Champions League Group Stage contributing to the team with one assist. He scored two goals in first Basel's match of UEFA Europa League's Quarter-finals versus Valencia of which the first was a beautiful 20-meters placed shot. He finished the 2013/2014 season with 5 goals and 9 assists to his name in 40 matches for the club.

The season 2014–15 was a very successful one for Delgado and for Basel. The Club won the championship for the sixth time in a row that season (twice in a row for Delgado) and in the 2014–15 Swiss Cup they reached the final. But for the third season in a row, they finished as runners-up, losing 0–3 to FC Sion in the final. Basel entered the Champions League in the group stage and reached the knockout phase as on 9 December 2014 they managed a 1–1 draw at Anfield against Liverpool. But then Basel lost to Porto in the Round of 16. Basel played a total of 65 matches (36 Swiss League fixtures, 6 Swiss Cup, 8 Champions League and 15 test matches). Under trainer Paulo Sousa Delgado totaled 46 appearances, 26 League, 6 Cup, 2 Champions League, as well 12 in test games. He scored 16 goals in these matches, of which 8 in the Swiss Super League, 2 in the Cup and 6 in test games.

On 10 July 2015 Basel announced that Delgado was named as new captain for the 2015–16 season after Marco Streller retired. On 19 August 2015, Delgado scored a penalty in a 2–2 draw against Israeli side Maccabi Tel Aviv in the St. Jakob-Park in the first leg of the Champions League playoffs. Under trainer Urs Fischer Delgado won the Swiss Super League championship at the end of the 2015–16 Super League season for the fifth time On 10 December 2016 Delgado played his 250th game for Basel. and at the end of the 2016–17 Super League season for the sixth time, his Fourth in series. For the club this was the eighth title in a row and their 20th championship title in total. They also won the Swiss Cup for the twelfth time, which meant they had won the double for the sixth time in the club's history.

== Career statistics ==
=== Club ===
As of 31 July 2017

| Club | Season | League | | Cup | | International | | Total | |
| Club | Season | Apps | Goals | Apps | Goals | Apps | Goals | Apps | Goals |
|---|---|---|---|---|---|---|---|---|---|
| Basel | 2003–04 | 20 | 2 | 1 | 0 | 1 | 0 | 22 | 2 |
| Basel | 2004–05 | 32 | 11 | 2 | 0 | 8 | 1 | 42 | 12 |
| Basel | 2005–06 | 33 | 18 | 3 | 2 | 14 | 7 | 50 | 27 |
| Basel | 2013–14 | 25 | 2 | 4 | 1 | 11 | 2 | 40 | 5 |
| Basel | 2014–15 | 26 | 8 | 6 | 2 | 2 | 0 | 34 | 10 |
| Basel | 2015–16 | 28 | 11 | 4 | 3 | 7 | 1 | 39 | 15 |
| Basel | 2016–17 | 29 | 10 | 3 | 2 | 6 | 0 | 38 | 12 |
| Basel | Total | 194 | 62 | 23 | 10 | 49 | 11 | 266 | 83 |
| Beşiktaş | 2006–07 | 26 | 4 | 7 | 2 | 2 | 0 | 35 | 4 |
| Beşiktaş | 2007–08 | 29 | 8 | 4 | 0 | 10 | 3 | 43 | 11 |
| Beşiktaş | 2008–09 | 26 | 6 | 2 | 1 | 4 | 1 | 32 | 7 |
| Beşiktaş | 2009–10 | 0 | 0 | 0 | 0 | 0 | 0 | 0 | 0 |
| Beşiktaş | 2010–11 | 2 | 0 | 0 | 0 | 4 | 2 | 6 | 2 |
| Beşiktaş | Total | 83 | 18 | 13 | 2 | 18 | 6 | 116 | 27 |
| Al Jazira | 2010–11 | 20 | 6 | 2 | 2 | 2 | 0 | 24 | 8 |
| Al Jazira | 2011–12 | 20 | 4 | 8 | 4 | 6 | 1 | 34 | 9 |
| Al Jazira | 2012–13 | 24 | 4 | 7 | 3 | 5 | 0 | 36 | 7 |
| Al Jazira | Total | 64 | 14 | 17 | 9 | 13 | 1 | 94 | 24 |
| Career total | | 341 | 94 | 43 | 21 | 80 | 18 | 464 | 123 |

== Honours ==
=== Club ===
Basel

- Swiss Super League: 2003–04, 2004–05, 2013–14, 2014–15, 2015–16, 2016–17
- Swiss Cup: 2016–17

Beşiktaş JK

- Turkish Super League: 2008–09
- Turkish Cup: 2006–07, 2008–09
- Turkish Super Cup: 2006

Al-Jazira Club

- UAE Pro-League: 2010–11
- UAE President's Cup: 2010–11, 2011–12

=== Individual ===
Basel

- Swiss Footballer of the Year: 2005–06
- UEFA Cup Top Goalscorer: 2005–06
- Swiss Super League Team of the Year: 2016–17

Sporting positions
| Preceded by İbrahim Üzülmez | Beşiktaş JK captain 2008–2009 | Succeeded by İbrahim Üzülmez |

Sporting positions
| Preceded by Marco Streller | FC Basel captain 2015–2017 | Succeeded by Marek Suchý |

== Sources and references ==
- All scorers 2005–06 UEFA Cup according to (excluding preliminary round) according to protocols UEFA + all scorers preliminary round
