= André Niederhäuser =

Swiss footballer (born 1977)

Personal information
- Full name: André Niederhäuser
- Date of birth: 21 August 1977 (age 49)
- Place of birth: Bern, Switzerland
- Height: 1.86 m (6 ft 1 in)
- Position: Defender

Team information
- Current team: BSC Young Boys II (manager)

Youth career
- –1997: BSC Young Boys II

Senior career*
Years	Team	Apps	(Gls)
1997–2000	BSC Young Boys	32	(2)
2000–2001	FC Schaffhausen	27	(6)
2001–2004	FC Vaduz	60	(10)
2004	SC Kriens	21	(3)
2004–2006	FC Luzern	24	(4)
2006	SC Kriens	2	(1)
2006–2007	FC Grenchen	14	(1)

Managerial career
- 2007–2009: BSC Young Boys II (assistant)
- 2009–2024: BSC Young Boys (youth)
- 2024–: BSC Young Boys II
- * Club domestic league appearances and goals

André Niederhäuser (born 21 August 1977) is a retired Swiss footballer who played as a defender. As of 2025 he is the manager for the B team of BSC Young Boys.

During his career, Niederhäuser played for BSC Young Boys, FC Schaffhausen, FC Vaduz, SC Kriens, FC Luzern and FC Grenchen.
