= Fernando Carreño =

Italian-Uruguayan footballer (born 1979)

Personal information
- Full name: Fernando Carreño Colombo
- Date of birth: 15 January 1979 (age 47)
- Place of birth: Montevideo, Uruguay
- Height: 1.87 m (6 ft 1 1/2 in)
- Position: Central defender

Youth career
- C.A. Peñarol

Senior career*
Years	Team	Apps	(Gls)
2001–2002	C.A. Peñarol	10	(0)
2002–2003	Qingdao Zhongneng	20	(2)
2003–2004	Sud América	18	(3)
2004–2005	BSC Young Boys	25	(3)
2005–2007	FC Aarau	45	(2)
2007–2009	SC Rheindorf Altach	27	(3)
2009–2010	Cerro	1	(0)
- * Club domestic league appearances and goals as of 28 June 2009

Fernando Carreño Colombo (born 15 January 1979) is an Italian-Uruguayan footballer who lately played as defender for Cerro. He previously spent his career at various foreign clubs.
