= Jean-François Bell =

Cameroonian footballer

Personal information
- Full name: Jean-François Bell
- Date of birth: October 7, 1981 (age 45)
- Place of birth: Cameroon
- Height: 1.84 m (6 ft 0 in)
- Position: Defender

Youth career
- 2000–2002: Team Genève-Servette-Carouge U18

Senior career*
Years	Team	Apps	(Gls)
2002–2004	Étoile Carouge FC		
2002	→ AC Bellinzona (loan)		
2003	→ BSC Young Boys (loan)		
2004–2005	AC Bellinzona	6	(0)
2005–2006	FC Vaduz	12	(2)
2006	→ FC Wil 1900 (loan)	1	(0)
2006–2007	Tonnerre Yaoundé		
2007–2010	Urania Genève Sport	35	(2)
2010–2012	FC Plan-les-Ouates		
- * Club domestic league appearances and goals as of 16 June 2013

Jean-François Bell (born October 6, 1981) is a retired Cameroonian football (soccer) defender.

== Playing career ==
During his career, Bell played for Étoile Carouge FC, AC Bellinzona, BSC Young Boys, FC Vaduz, FC Wil 1900, Tonnerre Yaoundé, Urania Genève Sport and FC Plan-les-Ouates.
