= Diego Capria =

Argentinian association football player

Personal information
- Full name: Diego Raul Capria Labiste
- Date of birth: 27 August 1972 (age 54)
- Place of birth: Argentina
- Position: Defender

Senior career*
| Years | Team | Apps | (Gls) |
| -1995 | Estudiantes de La Plata | 37 | (2) |
| 1995-1997 | Club Atlético Huracán | 54 | (4) |
| 1997-1999 | Racing Club de Avellaneda | 30 | (4) |
| 1999 | Chacarita Juniors | 17 | (4) |
| 2000 | Clube Atlético Mineiro | | |
| 2001-2002 | San Lorenzo de Almagro | | |
| 2002-2003 | Querétaro F.C. | 38 | (3) |
| 2003-2004 | San Lorenzo de Almagro | | |
| 2004-2005 | FC Zürich | 11 | (0) |
| 2005 | Instituto Atlético Central Córdoba | 15 | (0) |
| 2006-2007 | Quilmes Atlético Club | 22 | (1) |
- * Club domestic league appearances and goals

Diego Capria (born 27 August 1972 in Argentina) is an Argentinean retired footballer.
