= Michael Diethelm =

Swiss footballer (born 1985)

Personal information
- Full name: Michael Diethelm
- Date of birth: 24 January 1985 (age 41)
- Place of birth: Switzerland
- Height: 1.80 m (5 ft 11 in)
- Position: Defender

Team information
- Current team: FC Wohlen
- Number: 24

Youth career
- 1991–2003: FC Luzern

Senior career*
| Years | Team | Apps | (Gls) |
| 2003–2008 | FC Luzern | 111 | (3) |
| 2008–2011 | FC Wohlen | 48 | (5) |
| 2011–2012 | SC Cham | 21 | (2) |

International career
- Switzerland U-17
Medal record
Men's football
Representing Switzerland
UEFA European Under-17 Championship
| Winner | 2002 Denmark |
- * Club domestic league appearances and goals as of 21 April 2012, 24:00 (UTC)

Michael Diethelm (born 24 January 1985) is a footballer from Switzerland. He played as a defender for SC Cham in the Swiss 1. Liga.

He previously played for FC Luzern in the Swiss Super League and for FC Wohlen.

Diethelm is a former youth international and was in the Swiss U-17 squad that won the 2002 U-17 European Championships.

== Honours ==
- UEFA U-17 European Champion: 2002
