= César (footballer, born July 1979) =

Brazilian footballer

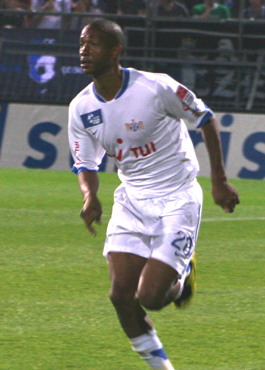
- César in 2007

Personal information
- Full name: Clederson César de Souza
- Date of birth: 14 July 1979 (age 47)
- Place of birth: Santos, São Paulo, Brazil
- Height: 1.88 m (6 ft 2 in)
- Position: Left winger

Youth career
- 1995–1998: Santos

Senior career*
Years	Team	Apps	(Gls)
1999	Santos		
1999–2002	Internacional		
2003	Portuguesa	18	(5)
2003–2007	FC Zürich	104	(28)
2007–2009	Al-Ahli Dubai	41	(26)
2009–2010	Hertha BSC	3	(0)
2010	Al-Ahli Dubai	3	(0)
Total		169	(59)
- * Club domestic league appearances and goals

Clederson César de Souza (born 14 July 1979), known as just César, is a Brazilian former professional footballer who played as a left winger.

== Career ==
He was part of the 2005–06 and 2006–07 Swiss Championship winning team, FC Zürich. On 31 January 2010, Al-Ahli Dubai signed the Brazilian midfielder from Hertha BSC until the end of the season.

== Honours ==
- Swiss Super League: 2005–06, 2006–07
- Swiss Cup: 2004–05
- UAE President cup: 2007–08
- UAE Supercup: 2008
- UAE Professional League Etisalat: 2008–09
