= Neri (footballer) =

Brazilian footballer (born 1976)

Neriana
Personal information
- Full name: Francisco Valmerino
- Date of birth: 15 February 1976 (age 50)
- Place of birth: Rio de Janeiro, Brazil
- Height: 1.82 m (5 ft 11 1/2 in)
- Position: Striker

Senior career*
Years	Team	Apps	(Gls)
1998–2000	FC St. Gallen	12	(1)
2000–2001	FC Wil 1900	29	(10)
2001–2003	SC Kriens	46	(26)
2003–2004	FC Schaffhausen	29	(17)
2004–2005	BSC Young Boys	34	(16)
2006	FC Aarau	10	(1)
2006–2007	FC Schaffhausen	29	(6)
2007	Enosis Neon Paralimni	10	(2)
2008	AC Bellinzona	16	(10)
- * Club domestic league appearances and goals as of 22 June 2008

Francisco Valmerino (born February 15, 1976), known as Neri, is a footballer from Brazil who last played as striker for AC Bellinzona.

== Career ==
He won the Swiss Super League in 2000 with FC St. Gallen.
