= Alhassane Keita =

Guinean footballer (born 1983)

Personal information
- Full name: Alhassane Keita Otchico
- Date of birth: 26 June 1983 (age 43)
- Place of birth: Conakry, Guinea
- Height: 1.69 m (5 ft 6 1/2 in)
- Position: Striker

Youth career
- 1999–2000: Horoya AC

Senior career*
Years	Team	Apps	(Gls)
2000–2001	Olympique Khouribga	15	(7)
2001–2006	Zürich	131	(58)
2006–2008	Ittihad	40	(19)
2008–2011	Mallorca	47	(8)
2010–2011	→ Valladolid (loan)	6	(0)
2011	Al-Shabab	6	(5)
2011–2012	Emirates Club	6	(2)
2012–2013	Dubai Club	10	(1)
2013–2014	St. Gallen	20	(4)
2015–2016	Jacksonville Armada	43	(13)
2017	Al-Watani		
2018	Jacksonville Armada	5	(2)

International career
2000–2009	Guinea	10	(0)
- * Club domestic league appearances and goals as of 1 July 2018

Alhassane Keita Otchico (born 26 June 1983), known as Keita, is a Guinean footballer who most recently played as a striker for American club Jacksonville Armada FC.

== Club career ==
Keita was born in Conakry. After beginning his professional career in Morocco with Olympique Khouribga, he moved to Switzerland in 2001 joining FC Zürich; during his five-season stay he scored goals at an extraordinary rate, including 20 in 2005–06 as the club emerged champions and the player was crowned league top scorer.

Keita started the 2006–07 campaign still in Zürich, netting four in as many games, but signed with Saudi Arabian side Ittihad FC, in Jeddah. In late June 2008 he joined Spain's RCD Mallorca on a five-year link, being irregularly used in his first year – he did manage, however, to score twice as a second-half substitute in a 2–0 La Liga home win over Real Valladolid.

In July 2009, Keita was initially banned for four months after it was found out he signed with Umm-Salal Sports Club in Qatar after he had already committed to Mallorca. As the appeals begun, though, he was able to start the new season with the team, appearing in several matches from the bench; in late January 2010, the situation was resolved favorably to the Spaniards.

Keita was loaned to Valladolid in the second division, initially in a season-long move. However, in late January 2011, he cancelled his loan agreement, terminated his contract with Mallorca and joined Al-Shabab Riyadh from Saudi Arabia until 2013.

In August 2011, Keita left Saudi Arabia for Emirates Club in the UAE Arabian Gulf League, following a short spell. The same month in the following year, he moved to Dubai CSC.

In early January 2015, Keita moved clubs and countries again, signing with Jacksonville Armada FC from the North American Soccer League. He left two years later, as their all-time leading scorer.

In July 2017, Keita joined Prince Mohammad bin Salman League's Al-Watani. On 28 March of the following year, he returned to the Armada.

== International career ==
Keita was part of the Guinean squad at the 2004 Africa Cup of Nations as they reached the competition's quarter-finals, with an exit against Mali. He did not play in the tournament, however.

== Club statistics ==
As of 30 May 2009

Season	club	championship
2000–01	Olympique Khouribga	15 games/7 goals
2001–02	Zürich	8/2
2002–03	Zürich	29/17
2003–04	Zürich	28/4
2004–05	Zürich	30/11
2005–06	Zürich	32/20
2006–07	Zürich	4/4
2006–07	Ittihad	22/12
2007–08	Ittihad	18/7
2008–09	Mallorca	24/5

== Honours ==
FC Zürich

- Swiss Super League: 2005–06, 2006–07
- Swiss Cup: 2004–05

Al-Ittihad

- Saudi Premier League: 2006–07

Individual

- Swiss Super League top goalscorer: 2005–06
