= 2005–06 Swiss Super League =

109th season of top-tier Swiss football

Swiss Super League
- Season: 2005–06
- Dates: 13 July 2005 – 14 May 2006
- Champions: Zürich; 10th title
- Relegated: Yverdon-Sport; Neuchâtel Xamax
- Champions League: Zürich
- UEFA Cup: Basel; Young Boys; Thun
- Intertoto Cup: Grasshopper
- Matches: 180
- Goals: 518 (2.88 per match)
- Top goalscorer: Alhassane Keita (20 goals)
- Biggest home win: St. Gallen 7–1 Neuchâtel Xamax
- Biggest away win: Thun 1–6 Zürich; Young Boys 1–6 Basel
- Highest scoring: Basel 7–2 Aarau
- Highest attendance: 32,712 (Basel vs. Zürich, 13 May 2006)

The 2005–06 Swiss Super League season was the 109th season of top-tier football in Switzerland. The competition was officially named AXPO Super League due to sponsoring purposes. It began on 13 July 2005 and has ended on 14 May 2006.

== Teams ==
Location of teams in the 2005–06 Swiss Super League

The 2005-06 Super League was contested by 10 teams. These being the first eight from the previous season, the winner of the previous season relegation play-off and one promoted team.

Basel were the defending champions, Thun were the previous runners-up. The next six teams were Grasshoppers (previous third) and FC Zürich (fifth) both of whom played in the UEFA Cup, Young Boys (fourth) and Neuchâtel Xamax (sixth) both of whom played in the UEFA Intertoto Cup and St. Gallen (seventh) and Aarau (eighth.

Because the parent company of Servette FC was declared bankrupt during the previous February and because the consequence was that the team had their license revoked, they did not finish the previous season and were relegated. The Challenge League 2004–05 champions Yverdon-Sport FC replaced them. FC Schaffhausen retained their position in the Super League by beating Challenge League runners-up FC Vaduz 2–1 in a two-legged relegation play-off.

== Overview ==
=== Season ===
The first round of the season was played on 19 July 2005. During the first half of the season the tens teams played a double round robin (home and away round) which was played through till 11 December. Then there was a winter break until the second half began on 12 February 2006. Again the tens teams played a double round robin. The last round of the season was played on 13 May 2006. The highest attendance at a match was 32,712 on the final day of the season in the game Basel against Zürich on 13 May 2006.

The league championship was decided by goal difference, with FC Zürich being named champions. Thus Zürich qualified for the 2006–07 Champions League, Basel and Young Boys qualified for the 2006–07 UEFA Cup and the Grasshoppers qualified for the 2006 UEFA Intertoto Cup. Yverdon-Sport were relegated and Xamax played in the Relegation play-off.

=== Basel hooligan incident ===
On the final day of the season, Basel were in first position in the league table, three points clear, and they had a home fixture in the sold out St. Jakob-Park against their sole remaining rivals for the championship title Zürich. A last-minute goal from Iulian Filipescu gave Zürich their first national championship since the 1980–81 season. The last minute loss of the Championship resulted in subsequent riots, the so-called Basel hooligan incident. Basel were punished because of their inability to control its own fans.

== League table ==
Pos	Team	Pld	W	D	L	GF	GA	GD	Pts	Qualification or relegation
1	Zürich (C)	36	23	9	4	86	36	+50	78	Qualification to Champions League second qualifying round
2	Basel	36	23	9	4	87	42	+45	78	Qualification to UEFA Cup first qualifying round
3	Young Boys	36	17	11	8	60	46	+14	62	Qualification to UEFA Cup first qualifying round
4	Grasshopper	36	14	13	9	44	33	+11	55	Qualification to Intertoto Cup second round
5	Thun	36	14	7	15	50	53	−3	49	
6	St. Gallen	36	11	7	18	51	56	−5	40	
7	Aarau	36	8	11	17	29	63	−34	35	
8	Schaffhausen	36	7	12	17	32	55	−23	33	
9	Neuchâtel Xamax (R)	36	9	6	21	41	70	−29	33	Qualification to relegation play-off
10	Yverdon-Sport (R)	36	9	5	22	38	64	−26	32	Relegation to Swiss Challenge League

Source: RSSSF
Rules for classification: 1) points; 2) goal difference; 3) number of goals scored.
(C) Champions; (R) Relegated

== Results ==
Teams play each other four times in this league. In the first half of the season each team played every other team twice (home and away) and then do the same in the second half of the season.

=== First half of season ===
Home \ Away	AAR	BAS	GCZ	NX	SHA	STG	THU	YB	YS	ZÜR
Aarau		0–2	0–1	2–0	0–2	1–4	2–1	1–0	1–1	1–1
Basel	7–2		1–0	3–0	1–0	1–0	5–1	1–1	3–1	2–1
Grasshopper	1–1	2–2		3–0	1–1	3–1	2–0	1–1	3–2	1–0
Neuchâtel Xamax	2–0	3–2	0–0		1–0	0–1	0–2	1–3	4–0	3–5
Schaffhausen	0–1	1–2	0–2	1–1		1–1	0–4	3–2	1–2	0–2
St. Gallen	2–1	3–3	1–1	7–1	0–0		5–1	0–1	2–1	1–3
Thun	2–0	3–0	2–1	2–3	0–3	5–1		1–1	3–0	1–6
Young Boys	0–0	1–6	0–3	3–2	3–1	1–0	0–0		2–2	3–1
Yverdon-Sport	4–1	1–2	2–0	4–1	0–1	1–0	2–0	0–3		0–2
Zürich	3–0	2–4	4–2	3–2	5–0	3–0	2–2	1–1	1–1	

Legend: Blue = home team win; Yellow = draw; Red = away team win.

=== Second half of season ===
Home \ Away	AAR	BAS	GCZ	NX	SHA	STG	THU	YB	YS	ZÜR
Aarau		1–5	1–0	3–1	1–1	1–0	0–1	1–5	1–0	1–1
Basel	1–1		2–1	2–1	1–1	3–1	2–0	2–0	2–1	1–2
Grasshopper	0–0	1–1		2–2	0–1	2–1	3–1	1–0	1–1	0–0
Neuchâtel Xamax	2–0	1–5	1–0		2–0	2–2	0–0	1–3	2–0	0–1
Schaffhausen	0–0	0–4	1–1	0–0		1–3	2–3	1–1	1–1	1–4
St. Gallen	1–1	2–2	0–2	1–0	3–0		1–0	1–3	2–0	2–3
Thun	1–1	1–1	0–1	3–0	2–1	3–1		1–1	1–0	1–3
Young Boys	2–1	4–2	1–1	1–0	1–2	2–0	2–1		2–1	0–2
Yverdon-Sport	3–1	1–3	0–1	2–1	0–4	2–1	0–1	1–3		0–3
Zürich	6–0	1–1	2–0	4–1	0–0	1–0	1–0	3–3	4–1	

Legend: Blue = home team win; Yellow = draw; Red = away team win.

== Relegation play-offs ==
18 May 2006
19:30 CEST

Sion	0–0	Neuchâtel Xamax

Stade Tourbillon, Sion
Attendance: 12,300
Referee: Massimo Busacca

21 May 2006
16:00 CEST

Neuchâtel Xamax	0–3	Sion
		Vogt 38', 59'; Gaspoz 68'

Stade de la Maladière, Neuchâtel
Attendance: 7,000
Referee: René Rogalla

Sion won 3–0 on aggregate.

== Top goalscorers ==
Rank	Player	Club	Goals
1	(Guinea) Alhassane Keita	FC Zurich	20
2	(Argentina) Matías Delgado	Basel	18
2	(Brazil) João Paulo	Young Boys	18
4	(Croatia) Mladen Petrić	Basel	14
4	(Brazil) Raffael	FC Zürich	14
5	(France) Eric Hassli	St. Gallen	13
5	(Argentina) Francisco Aguirre	Yverdon-Sport FC	13

== Attendances ==
#	Club	Average
1	Basel	21,806
2	Young Boys	14,139
3	Zürich	10,008
4	St. Gallen	8,589
5	GCZ	6,139
6	Thun	4,850
7	Aarau	4,656
8	Yverdon	3,475
9	Schaffhausen	3,306
10	Xamax	2,967

== Sources and references ==
- an English link to footballviolence.wordpress.com
