= António Carlos (footballer, born 1979) =

Brazilian footballer

Personal information
- Full name: António Carlos Dos Santos
- Date of birth: 3 October 1979 (age 47)
- Place of birth: Guaíra, Paraná, Brazil
- Height: 1.87 m (6 ft 1 1/2 in)
- Position: Midfielder

Youth career
- Marechal Rondon

Senior career*
Years	Team	Apps	(Gls)
1999	Winterthur	15	(2)
2000	Frauenfeld	20	(9)
2000–2001	Schaffhausen	16	(7)
2001–2002	Baden	14	(0)
2002–2003	Schaffhausen	34	(14)
2003–2004	Thun	45	(4)
2005	Schaffhausen	15	(5)
2005–2010	Grasshoppers	119	(38)
2009–2010	→ Sion (loan)	2	(0)
2010–2011	Chernomorets Burgas	12	(0)
2011	Audax		
2011–2015	Schaffhausen	56	(9)
2015–2017	Schaffhausen II	17	(8)
- * Club domestic league appearances and goals

Antonio Carlos Dos Santos (born 3 October 1979), known as just António Carlos, is a Brazilian former footballer who played as a midfielder. He was feared for his dangerous free kicks.
