= 2006–07 FC Basel season =

FC Basel
2006–07 season
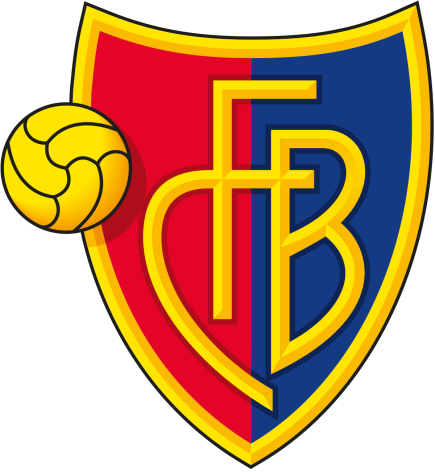
- Chairman: Gisela Oeri
- Manager: Christian Gross
- Stadium: St. Jakob-Park
- Swiss Super League: Runners-up
- Swiss Cup: Winners
- UEFA Cup: Group Stage
- Top goalscorer: League: Mladen Petrić (19); All: Mladen Petrić (36)
- Highest home attendance: 34,070 vs Zürich (22.04.2007)
- Lowest home attendance: 0 vs Schaffhausen (22.07.2006); 0 vs Grasshoppers (05.08.2006); 11,643 vs Tobol (13.07.2006)
- Average home league attendance: 20,105

The 2006–07 season is Fussball Club Basel 1893's 114th in existence and the club's 13th consecutive season in the top flight of Swiss football. FCB played their home matches in the St. Jakob-Park, in the Basel quarter St. Alban in the south-east of the city. After four season as Basel's chairman Werner Edelmann stood down and Mrs Gisela Oeri was voted as the club's very first chairwoman at the AGM.

== Overview ==
Christian Gross was head coach for the eighth successive season. Ahead of the new season Basel made a number of transfers. The most notable was the replacement of Swiss international goalkeeper Pascal Zuberbühler, who transferred to West Bromwich Albion, with the Argentinian international Franco Costanzo who came from Deportivo Alavés. Delron Buckley was signed on loan from Borussia Dortmund. Cristiano dos Santos Rodrigues was signed in from Roda JC and Franz Burgmeier was signed in from FC Aarau.

Other players who transferred out were Matias Emilio Delgado who went to Beşiktaş Istanbul. Djamel Mesbah and Samuele Preisig both moved onto FC Aarau and both on a free transfer. Zdravko Kuzmanović left the club during the winter break for Fiorentina. Mikhail Kavelashvili also left the club in the winter break and retired from his active football career.

FCB started the season with various warm-up matches. These included teams from the Swiss lower league as well as teams from France, Croatia and Ukraine. The FC Basel had set three aims for the 2006–07 season, these were to win back the league and cup titles and thirdly to stay in the UEFA Cup over the winter break.

Franco Costanzo was voted to player of season

== The Campaign ==
=== Domestic League ===
Following the last minute loss of the 2005–06 Super League Championship as a result of the 1–2 home defeat against FC Zürich on 13 May 2006 and the subsequent riots, the so-called Basel Hooligan Incident, the club had to carry consequences. As well as the big fine, the first two home games of the 2006–07 Super League season were held completely without fans, as so called "ghost matches". The following three matches were held with just a part of the stadium capacity, without the fans from the "Muttenzer Kurve" (the eastern fan block).

There were ten teams competing in the top tier 2006–07 Swiss Super League. The teams played a double round-robin in the first half of the season and then another double round-robin in the second half. There were three points for a victory and one each for a draw. The champions would enter the third qualifying round of the 2007–08 UEFA Champions League. The championship runners-up would enter the UEFA Cup second qualifying round. The third placed team would enter the UEFA Cup first qualifying round. The bottom placed team would be relegated, the second last team would play a play-off against relegation.

Following a very poor start to the season, five defeats in the first ten rounds, Basel were ten championship points behind the table leaders. They started a catch up race after the winter break and finished the league campaign as runners-up, just one point behind champions FC Zürich. This was despite the fact that they defeated Zürich in three of the four direct matches during that league season. Basel missed their championship aim.

=== Domestic Cup ===
FC Liestal

In the early rounds of the 2006–07 Swiss Cup Basel were drawn with away games against lower league teams. Basel started in the third round against local team FC Liestal. Cristiano dos Santos Rodrigues played his team debut on 26 August 2006 in the Cup match against local club FC Liestal. He scored three goals for his new club, during the first 27 minutes of the game, as Basel advanced with the end score 6–1 to the next round. Delron Buckley (19), captain Ivan Ergić (20) and Daniel Majstorović (66) scored the other goals. It was also Majstorović who was responsible for the final result with an own goal in the 70th minute.

AC Lugano

In the second-round opponents were second tier Lugano. Basel clearly won this tie as well 4–0 and goal scorers were Delron Buckley, Filipe Caicedo, Mladen Petrić and Franz Burgmeier, whereas the last three goals weren't scored until the last 15 minutes of the match. The match was noted as being very rough, referee René Rogalla showed the yellow card to five Lugano players.

FC Baulmes

However, in the third-round game on 12 November away against second tier FC Baulmes extra time was needed before the tie was decided. Basel played a bad first half, Bruno Berner had to clear a ball off the line, with goalkeeper Franco Costanzo already beaten. Head coach Christian Gross made three early substitutions, but despite these changes, the hosts went two goals up in the 72nd minute. Filipe Caicedo, who had been substituted in at half time, reacted quickly and scored within a minute and Mladen Petrić equalised within another few minutes. During the extra time the hosts were visibly tired and Mile Sterjovski was able to score the winning goal for the visitors.

FC Aarau

After the New Year, the quarterfinal was a home tie against FC Aarau on the 14 March 2007. The match was decided very early, Mile Sterjovski netted the first attacking move in the first minute of the game. Aarau tried everything afterwards to get level. Goalkeeper Franco Costanzo had a good day and made good saves. Aarau complained for a penalty as Demetrio Greco was brought down five minutes from the end, but referee Sascha Kever did not blow his whistle. Two minutes into the over-time nearly the decider, but Eren Derdiyok's shot hit the post. Four minutes into the over-time Costanzo made another good save and Basel were through to the next round.

FC Wil

The semifinal was an away tie against FC Wil on 26 April. Basel took the lead 5 minutes before half-time as Scott Chipperfield netted and Franz Burgmeier netted the second five minutes after the break. Kristian Nushi pulled one back for the home team after 57 minutes. But Delron Buckley put his side two goals ahead again some 10 minutes later. This was the final score and Basel advanced to the final

FC Luzern

The Final took place at Stade de Suisse, Wankdorf in Bern on Whit Monday 28 May 2007 in front of 30,000 spectators. Basel won the Cup by beating Luzern 1–0.

Most of the time it was a close game, Basel controlled the game, both teams had chances. Luzern's keeper David Zibung became the tragic hero in the sold-out Stade de Suisse in Bern, who, according to the interpretation of referee Nicole Petignat, in the 90th minute pulled Scott Chipperfield off his feet. Zibung was sent off and Besnik Zukaj was substituted in. The winning goal came from the penalty spot through Daniel Majstorović in the 93rd minute, Zukaj had no chance of saving it. Basel manager Christian Gross said the game afterwards: "We really didn't have an easy task with FC Luzern, they managed to close the room very well."

Conclusion

Basel had missed the championship just four days earlier, but they achieved their aim of winning the cup on this Whit Monday.

=== Europe ===
FC Basel's European campaign started in the first qualifying stage of the UEFA Cup, here they beat Kazakhi side FC Tobol 3–1 on aggregate. In the second qualifying round they drawn against FC Vaduz from Liechtenstein, narrowly progressing on the away goals rule after a 2–2 aggregate draw. In the first round of the competition Basel were drawn against Macedonians FK Rabotnički. Basel won 6–2 at St. Jakob-Park and 1–0 at the Skopje City Stadium. Thus they qualified for the group stages where they faced tough opposition. Together with Blackburn Rovers of England, AS Nancy of France, Feyenoord of The Netherlands and Wisła Kraków of Poland, Basel were drawn into Group E. In the Group stage, the teams played a single round-robin, each with two home games.

Feyenoord

Basel's first game was at home against Feyenoord. The Dutch side were second best for much of the game and the only surprise was that it took Basel an hour before they edged ahead. A draw had looked highly unlikely for much of the match and goalkeeper Henk Timmer was the busiest man on the field. Mladen Petrić, Scott Chipperfield and Mile Sterjovski all had shots at his goal in the opening 12 minutes. With more accuracy Petrić could have had a hat-trick inside 20 minutes, as he headed wide and then drove over the crossbar. Basel dominated the match and it was not a surprise as Eduardo struck on the hour, tapping in after Timmer could only parry Petrić's shot. Stein Huysegems came off the substitutes' bench to earn Feyenoord a 1–1 draw with a goal within five minutes of coming on and with only 14 minutes remaining. The last action belonged to Timmer, who acrobatically kept out Petrić's free-kick as the Dutch side held on.

Blackburn Rovers

Their next group match was an away tie at Ewood Park against Blackburn Rovers. Basel played reasonably well but shaky defending towards the end of the game sealed their downfall. Australian defender Lucas Neill had the first goal chance for the home team after four minutes, but goalkeeper Franco Costanzo held. Turckish midfielder Tugay Kerimoğlu tried an overhead kick after eight minutes, but it went far off. Zdravko Kuzmanović saw the yellow card just after that, but only the referee knew why. Morten Gamst Pedersen tried a wide range shot one minute later again Costanzo held. Eduardo had Basel's first chance, the Blackburn defence could clear, but it went off for a corner. There was a great chance after Eduardo crossed, but Mladen Petrić put the ball next to the goal. 32nd Minute offside, a clear wrong decision, as Eduardo started off alone towards the Blackburn goal. There were chances on both sides. Blackburn had 20 attempts, 11 of which on target. Basel had ten, but only four on target. 15 minutes from time Tugay Kerimoğlu scored in the top left corner with a good 25 meter Sunday shot. The disastrous referee Oleh Oriekhov gave a penalty against Basel after a clear dive and Francis Jeffers scored from the spot in the 90th minute. Benni McCarthy added a third goal in the third minute of over time as the defence oversaw him.

AS Nancy

Their next opponents were AS Nancy in a home game at the St. Jakob-Park on 23 November. Basel went behind twice, but were able to draw level both times. Basel had two early chances, captain Ivan Ergić in the 14th minute and another in the 21st, but the game started rather slow. It exploded into life just after the half-hour when Monsef Zerka broke down the right for the French team and cut into the area before laying off a perfectly weighted pass for Kim, who finished off nicely. The lead did not quite correspond to the course of the game. The Basel response was immediate, Reto Zanni supplying Scott Chipperfield as the Australian international broke from midfield to fire past Olivier Sorin from inside the area. But Nancy were back in front within two minutes. Pascal Berenguer curled in a superb free-kick after he had been upended by Papa Malick Ba. After the restart, Basel pressed for the second equaliser through a shot from Kōji Nakata. Parity was restored, however, on 56 minutes as Mile Sterjovski got the final touch to a free-kick from the influential Mladen Petrić. Basel were pushing for the winning goal, as during the last minute of the game they were caught by a counterattack. Goalkeeper Franco Costanzo was only able to stop the Nancy attack by fouling Issiar Dia, which resulted in his sending off and a penalty against Basel. They had already used all three substitutes, therefore striker Mladen Petrić donned the goalkeeper shirt and stood between the posts. He was able to save the penalty kick taken by Mickaël Chrétien, thus helping his team to the 2–2 draw.

Wisła Kraków

Basel's last group game was played away against Wisła Kraków at the Wisła Stadium. FCB needed a win to qualify for the next round. The hosts had the first good chance, but Basel started better into the game. Basel's striker Mladen Petrić netted the first goal after a corner in the 8th minute. Daniel Majstorović header was a very good pass and Petrić easily pushed the ball over the line. Wisla, who lost the other three games in the group stage, but had scored one goal in each, pressed hard and scored the equaliser within just two minutes. Paweł Brożek pushed the ball between goalkeeper Louis Crayton legs in their next attack. Paweł Brożek then had another three or four good chances before the half time whistle from Hungarian referee Viktor Kassai. In the second period Wisła central defender Cléber saw a yellow card for a foul in the 46th minute. Then midfielder Radosław Sobolewski saw a yellow card in the 50th minute and five minutes later he had a good chance, but he took a hand to help and the referee had seen this. Paweł Brożek's twin brother and striking campagnion Piotr Brożek had had a good first half, but after the break he wasn't in the game any longer and was substituted out after 67 minutes. His replacement was Jean Paulista and he had the first good scene in the second half and scored Wisla's second goal on 71 minutes. Paweł Brożek then had another good chance in the 80th minute. Crayton rescues sensationally, but remained somewhat dazed lying on the pitch, because Brozek did not jump up properly and accidentally hit him on the head with his boot. Paweł Brożek became man of the match just three minutes later as he took the pass from Jakub Błaszczykowski and netted the team's third goal, for Wisla to win, with the end result 3–1.

Conclusion

Basel's poor European campaign came to an end after losing 3–1 to Wisla, despite taking an early lead. Basel missed their aim to remain in European competition over the winter break. Despite everything, it was a disappointing European campaign.

== Club ==
=== The Management ===
Position	Staff
Manager	(Switzerland) Christian Gross
Assistant manager	(Switzerland) Fritz Schmid
Fitness Coach	(Switzerland) Thomas Grüter
Fitness Coach	(Switzerland) Romain Crevoisier
Youth Team Coach	(Switzerland) Heinz Hermann
Youth Team Co-Coach	(Switzerland) Sandro Kamber

Last updated: 17 May 2008
Source: Homepage FCB

=== Kit ===
Supplier: Nike
Sponsor(s): Novartis

Home	Away

Source: Homepage FCB

=== Other information ===
Chairman	(Switzerland) Mrs Gisela Oeri
Ground (capacity and dimensions)	St. Jakob-Park (42,500 / 120x80 m)

Updated to match played 19 July 2007
Source: Homepage FCB

== Players ==
=== First team squad ===
Note: Flags indicate national team as defined under FIFA eligibility rules; some limited exceptions apply. Players may hold more than one non-FIFA nationality.

No.	Pos.	Nation	Player
1	GK	ARG	Franco Costanzo
3	DF	BIH	Damir Džombić
4	DF	SUI	Michel Morganella
5	DF	SWE	Daniel Majstorović (vicecaptain)
6	DF	JPN	Kōji Nakata
8	MF	AUS	Mile Sterjovski
9	MF	SRB	Marko Perović
10	FW	CRO	Mladen Petrić
11	MF	AUS	Scott Chipperfield
12	MF	SEN	Papa Malick Ba
15	MF	LIE	Franz Burgmeier
17	MF	CRO	Ivan Rakitić
18	GK	LBR	Louis Crayton
19	DF	RSA	Delron Buckley

No.	Pos.	Nation	Player
20	MF	ECU	Filipe Caicedo
21	DF	FRA	François Marque
22	MF	SRB	Ivan Ergić (captain)
23	FW	BRA	Eduardo
28	DF	SUI	Patrik Baumann
29	DF	SUI	Simone Grippo
30	DF	SUI	Boris Smiljanić
31	FW	SUI	Eren Derdiyok
32	DF	SUI	Reto Zanni (vicecaptain)
34	GK	SUI	Oliver Stöckli
—	MF	GEO	Mikhail Kavelashvili
—	MF	BRA	Cristiano dos Santos Rodrigues
—	MF	SRB	Zdravko Kuzmanović
—	FW	ARG	César Carignano

==== Multiple Nationality ====
- 1 (Argentina) (Italy) Franco Costanzo
- 5 (Sweden) (Croatia) Daniel Majstorović
- 9 (Serbia) (Kosovo) Marko Perović
- 10 (Croatia) (Switzerland) Mladen Petrić
- 11 (Australia) (Switzerland) Scott Chipperfield
- 17 (Croatia) (Switzerland) Ivan Rakitić
- 18 (Liberia) (Switzerland) Louis Crayton
- 22 (Serbia) (Australia) Ivan Ergić
- 31 (Switzerland) (Turkey) Eren Derdiyok

=== Transfers summer 2006 ===
==== In ====
—	MF	LIE	Franz Burgmeier (from FC Aarau)
1	GK	ARG	Franco Costanzo (from Deportivo Alavés)
—	MF	BRA	Cristiano dos Santos Rodrigues (from Roda JC)
—	DF	RSA	Delron Buckley (from Borussia Dortmund on loan)

==== Out ====
—	GK	SUI	Pascal Zuberbühler (to West Bromwich Albion)
—	MF	SUI	Djamel Mesbah (to FC Aarau – Free)
—	MF	SUI	Samuele Preisig (to FC Aarau – Free)
—	MF	ARG	Matias Emilio Delgado (to Beşiktaş Istanbul – n/a)

=== Transfers winter 2006–07 ===
==== In ====
—	FW	SUI	Eren Derdiyok (from Basel U-21)
—	DF	FRA	François Marque (from FC Baulmes)

==== Out ====
—	MF	SRB	Zdravko Kuzmanović (to Beşiktaş – n/a)
—	MF	GEO	Mikhail Kavelashvili (end of contract)

== Results and fixtures ==
=== Friendlies ===
==== Pre- and mid-season friendlies ====
21 June 2006 Pre-season friendly	Celerina Selection	0–11	Basel	San Gian, Celerina
18:30		Summary	8' (0:1) Kavelashvili; 13' (0:2) Carignano; 19' (0:3), 82' Kavelashvili; 21' (0:4) Petrić; 33' (0:5) Petrić; 41' (0:6) Carignano; 54' (0:7), 80' Carignano; 65' (0:8) Ba; 76' (0:9) Delgado; 80' (0:10) Carignano; 82' (0:11) Kavelashvili	Attendance: 500; Referee: Patrick Collet

24 June 2006 Pre-season friendly	FC Wil	0–2	Basel	Sportplatz Kett, Sirnach
18:30		Summary	15' (0:1) Carignano; 38' (0:2) Petrić	Attendance: 500; Referee: Sasa Ratkovic

1 July 2006 Pre-season friendly	Basel	2–0	Auxerre	Stade Léon Burrus, Boncourt
16:00	Berner 38' (1:0); Petrić 38' (2:0)	Summary		Attendance: 500; Referee: Alain Bieri

4 July 2006 Pre-season friendly	Basel	2–2	Dinamo Zagreb	Stadion FC Solothurn, Solothurn
18:30	Rakitić 62' (1:2); Petrić 90+3' (2:2)	Summary	33' (0:1) Vugrinec; 39' (pen. 0:2) da Silva	Attendance: 800; Referee: Claudio Circhetta

8 July 2006 Pre-season friendly	Basel	0–0	Shakhtar Donetsk	Stade de Delley-Portalban
17:00		Report		Attendance: 800; Referee: Guido Wildhaber

15 August 2006 Friendly	Frauenfeld	1–4	Basel	Sportplatz Kleine Allmend, Frauenfeld
19:00	Kern 49' (1:3)	Summary	10' (0:1) Derdiyok; 21' (0:2) Kavelashvili; 23' (0:3) Läng; 55' (1:4) Derdiyok	Attendance: 1,200; Referee: Claudio Bernold

5 September 2006 Friendly	FC Laufen	1–6	Basel	Sportplatz Nau, Laufen
18:30	Cosic 12' (1:0)	Summary	21' (1:1) Cristiano; 49' (og 1:2) Friedli; 53' (1:3) Cristiano; 68' (1:4) Buckley; 86' (1:5) Kavelashvili; 90' (1:6) Kavelashvili	Attendance: 1,035; Referee: Laffranchi

10 October 2006 Friendly	BSC Old Boys	0–8	Basel	Schützenmatte, Basel
19:00		Summary	9' (pen. 0:1) Nakata; 10' (0:2), 78' Kavelashvili; 11' (0:3) Cristiano; 43' (0:4) Grippo; 53' (0:5) Grossklaus; 58' (og 0:6) Boumelaha; 69' (0:7) Lang; 78' (0:8) Kavelashvili	Attendance: 525; Referee: Lanfranchi

==== Winter break and mid-season friendlies ====
16 January 2007 Winter break	Basel	9–2	Wohlen	Stadion Rankhof, Basel
18:30	Petrić 5' (1:0); Ergić 7' (2:0); Petrić 16' (3:0); Sterjovski 36' (4:0); Zanni 41' (5:0); Rakitić 53' (6:2); Cristiano 62' (7:2); Rakitić 65' (8:2); Cristiano 79' (9:2)	Summary	44' (5:1) Schultz; 47' (5:2) Knežević	Attendance: 600; Referee: Claudio Circhetta

21 January 2007 Winter break	Basel	4–1	Yverdon-Sport	Stadion Rankhof, Basel
15:00	Sterjovski 12' (1:0); Petrić 25' (2:0); Petrić 51' (3:0); Ergić 63' (4:1)	Summary	50' (3:1) Moser	Attendance: 1,200; Referee: B. Jenzer

24 January 2007 Training camp	Hércules Alicante	2–2	Basel	Sportplatz La Manga, La Manga
16:30	Ariel Montenegro 18' (pen. 1:0); Moisés 53' (2:2)	Summary	34' (1:1) Kuzmanović; 38' (1:2) Smiljanić	Attendance: 30; Referee: José Maria Frutos Orenes

28 January 2007 Training camp	Copenhagen	3–3	Basel	Sportplatz La Manga, La Manga
15:30	Aílton Almeida 18' (1:0); Marcus Allbäck 32' (2:0); Silberbauer 80' (3:3)	Summary	34' (2:1) Petrić; 44' (2:2) Derdiyok; 69' (2:3) Derdiyok	Attendance: 20; Referee: Avilés Nebra (Murcia)

31 January 2007 Training camp	Basel	2–2	Hoffenheim	Sportplatz La Manga, La Manga
	Derdiyok 42' (1:0); Burgmeier 50' (2:0)	Summary	66' (2:1) Salihović; 72' (2:2)Salihović	Attendance: 30; Referee: Alfonso Melgares De Aguilar Fernández

3 February 2007 Winter break	Basel	6–1	Solothurn	Schützenmatte, Basel
15:00	Petrić 12' (1:0); Petrić 21' (2:0); Caicedo 27' (3:0); Chipperfield 50' (4:0); Petrić (penalty missed) 71′ Derdiyok 77' (5:0); Frei 89' (6:1)	Summary	80' (pen. 5:1) P. Hasler	Attendance: 1,500; Referee: Adrien Jaccottet

6 February 2007 Winter break	Basel	2–0	Xamax	Schützenmatte, Basel
15:00	Frei 39' (1:0); Grossklaus 63' (2:0)	Summary		Attendance: 500; Referee: Bruno Grossen
Note: Basel with test player Tim Grossklaus from youth team

6 March 2007 Mid-season	BSC Old Boys	1–6	Basel	Schützenmatte, Basel
19:00	Schwery 88' (pen. 1:6)	Summary	4' (0:1) Derdiyok; 14' (pen. 0:2) Buckley; 20' (0:3) Frei; 53' (0:4) Derdiyok; 56' (0:5) Derdiyok; 64' (0:6) Caicedo; (penalty missed) 80′ Caicedo	Attendance: 400; Referee: Claudio Circhetta

23 March 2007 Mid-season	SC Kriens	1–1	Basel	Sportplatz Wissenhusen, Schötz
19:00	Piu 41' (1:0)	Summary	81' (1:1) Ferreira da Costa	Attendance: 1,000; Referee: Marco Peranda (Emmenbrücke)
Note: Basel with test player Talisson Ferreira da Costa from youth team

=== Swiss Super League ===
==== First half of season ====
19 July 2006 Round 1	Young Boys	1–1	Basel	Wankdorf, Bern
19:45	Varela 38' (1:0); Dos Santos (yellow card) 66'	Summary	45' (1:1) Ergić; (yellow card) 55' Sterjovski	Attendance: 20,693; Referee: (Switzerland) René Rogalla

22 July 2006 Round 2	Basel	3–0	Schaffhausen	St. Jakob-Park, Basel
17:45	Sterjovski 4' (1:0); Kuzmanović (yellow card) 37'; Rakitić (yellow card) 49'; Chipperfield 82' (2:0); Petrić 90+2' (3:0)	Summary	(yellow card) 52' Weller; (yellow card) 90+2' Pires	Attendance: 349; Referee: (Switzerland) Daniel Wermelinger
Note: Game without supporters

30 July 2006 Round 3	St. Gallen	3–2	Basel	Espenmoos, St. Gallen
16:00	Aguirre 8' (1:0); Koubský (yellow card) 20'; Montandon (yellow card) 29'; Aguirre (yellow card) 44'; Aguirre 44' (2:0); Aguirre 52' (3:1)	Summary	(yellow card) 14' Kuzmanović; 49' (2:1) Petrić; 86' (3:2) Ergić	Attendance: 10,000; Referee: (Switzerland) Nicole Petignat

5 August 2006 Round 4	Basel	2–3	Grasshoppers	St. Jakob-Park, Basel
17:45	Majstorović 30' (1:0); Petrić (yellow card) 45'; Petrić 81' (2:3)	Summary	37' (1:1) Ristić; 47' (1:2) dos Santos; 49' (1:3) Renggli; (yellow card) 70' Sutter; (yellow card) 81' Coltorti	Attendance: 0 Referee: (Switzerland) Sasa Kever
Note: Game without supporters

18 August 2006 Round 5	Basel	4–1	Thun	St. Jakob-Park, Basel
16:00	Ergić 28' (1:0); Petrić 30' (2:0); Kuzmanović 32' (3:0); Chipperfield 45' (4:0); Ergić (yellow card) 46'; Ba (yellow card) 8' (red card) 69'	Summary	(yellow card) 29' Deumi; (yellow card) 47' Leandro; 73' (4:1) Deumi	Attendance: 19,321; Referee: (Switzerland) René Rogalla

20 August 2006 Round 6	Sion	4–2	Basel	Tourbillon, Sion
16:00	Di Zenzo 2' (1:0); Reset 8' (2:0); Regazzoni 50' (3:2); Regazzoni 65' (pen. 4:2)	Summary	9' (2:1) Burgmeier; (yellow card) 16' Berner; 45' (pen. 2:2) Majstorović; (yellow card) 33' (red card) 60' Burgmeier; (yellow card) 63' Zanni; (yellow card) 65' Majstorović; (yellow card) 72' Sterjovski	Attendance: 12,500; Referee: (Switzerland) Bertolini

10 September 2006 Round 7	Basel	2–1	Zürich	St. Jakob-Park, Basel
16:00	Petrić 2' (1:0); Petrić 47' (2:1); Majstorović (yellow card) 62'; Costanzo (yellow card) 90+2'	Summary	20' (1:1) Raffael; (yellow card) 62' Raffael; (yellow card) 61' (red card) 93' Cesar	Attendance: 19,897; Referee: (Switzerland) Cyril Zimmermann

18 September 2006 Round 8	Luzern	2–0	Basel	Stadion Allmend, Luzern
19:45	Tchouga 62' (1:0); Paquito 78' (2:0); (yellow card) 89' Zibung	Summary	(yellow card) 11' Ba; (yellow card) 73' Berner; (yellow card) 86' Kavelashvili	Attendance: 10,089; Referee: (Switzerland) Massimo Busacca

23 September 2006 Round 9	Basel	3–1	Aarau	St. Jakob-Park, Basel
17:45	Buckley 40' (1:1); Zanni (yellow card) 56'; Petrić 62' (2:1); Petrić 79' (3:1)	Summary	17' (0:1) Antić; (yellow card) 26' Achiou; (yellow card) 35' Preisig; (yellow card) 72' Brabec; (yellow card) 90' Fotheringham	Attendance: 15,872; Referee: (Switzerland) Kever

3 October 2006 Round 10	Basel	P – P	Young Boys	St. Jakob-Park, Basel

1 October 2006 Round 11	Schaffhausen	4–2	Basel	Stadion Breite, Schaffhausen
16:00	Tarone 26' (1:0); Tarone 31' (2:0); Sereinig 43' (3:1); Kamanan 90' (4:2)	Summary	34' (2:1) Nakata; 54' (3:2) Petrić	Attendance: 4,250; Referee: (Switzerland) Guido Wildhaber

22 October 2006 Round 12	Basel	2–1	St. Gallen	St. Jakob-Park, Basel
16:00	Rakitić 30' (1:0); Ergić 60' (2:0); (yellow card) 68'	Summary	(yellow card) 27' Di Jorio; (yellow card) 29' Gelabert; 72' (pen. 2:1) Aguirre	Attendance: 21,084; Referee: (Switzerland) Reto Rutz

28 October 2006 Round 13	Grasshoppers	1–2	Basel	Hardturm, Zürich
17:45	Langkamp 37' (1:2); Salatić (yellow card) 51'	Summary	10' (0:1) Petrić; 25' (0:2) Kuzmanović; (yellow card) 35' Eduardo	Attendance: 13,800; Referee: (Switzerland) Massimo Busacca

5 November 2006 Round 14	Thun	1–1	Basel	Stadion Lachen, Thun
16:00	Rama 38' (1:0); Galli (yellow card) 59'	Summary	(yellow card) 30' Zanni; 81' (1:1) Eduardo	Attendance: 6,100; Referee: (Switzerland) Claudio Circhetta

9 November 2006 Round 10	Basel	2–2	Young Boys	St. Jakob-Park, Basel
19:45	Eduardo (yellow card) 43'; Caicedo 62' (1:2); Cristiano 85' (2:2)	Summary	(yellow card) 7' (yellow-red card) 25' Yapi; 55' (0:1) Jun; 56' (0:2) Marcos; (yellow card) 89' (yellow-red card) 90' Chiumiento	Attendance: 20,130; Referee: (Switzerland) Laperrière

18 November 2006 Round 15	Basel	3–1	Sion	St. Jakob-Park, Basel
17:45	Sterjovski 1' (1:0); Petrić 30' (2:0); Majstorović (yellow card) 63'; Petrić 81' (3:0)	Summary	(yellow card) 40' Sarni; (yellow card) 82' Mijadinoski; 90' (3:1) Kuljić	Attendance: 22,925; Referee: (Switzerland) Guido Wildhaber

26 November 2006 Round 16	Zürich	3–2	Basel	Hardturm, Zürich
16:00	Eudis 43' (1:0); Džemaili 44' (2:0); Margairaz 72' (3:1); Džemaili (yellow card) 85'; Cesar (yellow card) 89'	Summary	(yellow card) 6' Kuzmanović; (yellow card) 65' Zanni; 67' (2:1) Sterjovski; 73' (3:2) Caicedo; (yellow card) 89' Sterjovski	Attendance: 18,100 (sold out); Referee: (Switzerland) Reto Rutz

4 December 2006 Round 17	Basel	3–0	Luzern	St. Jakob-Park, Basel
19:45	Ergić 2' (1:0); Rakitić 55' (2:0); Chipperfield 72' (3:0)	Summary	(yellow card) 65' N'Tiamoah	Attendance: 19,200; Referee: (Switzerland) Nicole Petignat

10 December 2006 Round 18	Aarau	2–3	Basel	Stadion Brügglifeld, Aarau
16:00	Achiou 45' (1:2); Zanni 68' (o.g. 0:2)	Summary	25' (0:1) Petrić; 35' (0:2) Kuzmanović; (yellow card) 37' Sterjovski; 81' (2:3) Petrić; (yellow card) 83' Majstorović; (yellow card) 92' Petrić	Attendance: 8,600; Referee: (Switzerland) Laperrière

==== Second half of season ====
11 February 2007 Round 19	Young Boys	0–3	Basel	Wankdorf, Bern
16:00	Shi Jun (yellow card) 54'; Yakin (yellow card) 65'; Tiago (yellow card) 90'	Summary	(yellow card) 13' Chipperfield; (yellow card) 18' Ba; 24' (0:1) Chipperfield; 39' (0:2) Caicedo; 69' (0:3) Chipperfield	Attendance: 18,549; Referee: (Switzerland) Jérôme Laperrière

17 February 2007 Round 20	Basel	1–0	Luzern	St. Jakob-Park, Basel
17:45	Petrić 40' (pen. 1:0); Smiljanić (yellow card) 92'	Summary	(yellow card) 31' Seoane; (yellow card) 57' C. Lustenberger; (yellow card) 71' Mettomo; (yellow card) 76' (yellow-red card) 78' Cantaluppi; (yellow card) 78' Dal Santo; (yellow card) 84' Makanaki	Attendance: 19,851; Referee: (Switzerland) Cyril Zimmermann

25 February 2007 Round 21	Sion	0–0	Basel	Tourbillon, Sion
16:00	Nwaneri (yellow card) 7'; Gelson (yellow card) 49'; Obradović (yellow card) 76'; João Pinto (yellow card) 82'	Summary	(yellow card) 26' Sterjovski; (yellow card) 73' Smiljanić; (yellow card) 90' Zanni	Attendance: 12,800; Referee: (Switzerland) René Rogalla

4 March 2007 Round 22	Grasshoppers	1–5	Basel	Hardturm, Zürich
16:00	Salatić (red card) 18'; Rinaldo (yellow card) 40'; Aílton 90' (1:5)	Summary	(yellow card) 5' Ba; 11' (0:1) Rakitić; (yellow card) 13' Sterjovski; 45' (0:2) Sterjovski; 50' (0:3) Petrić; 56' (0:4) Petrić; 88' (0:5) Majstorović	Attendance: 15,500; Referee: (Switzerland) Wildhaber

10 March 2007 Round 23	Basel	0–0	Schaffhausen	St. Jakob-Park, Basel
17:45	Caicedo (yellow card) 32'; Smiljanić (yellow card) 36'; Nakata (yellow card) 51'	Summary	(yellow card) 20' (yellow-red card) 24' Bochud; (yellow card) 83' Todisco	Attendance: 20,299; Referee: (Switzerland) Daniel Wermelinger

18 March 2007 Round 24	Aarau	0–1	Basel	Brügglifeld, Aarau
16:00	Hima (yellow card) 90+3' (yellow-red card) 90+3'	Summary	27' (0:1) Rakitić; (yellow card) 58' Costanzo	Attendance: 7,000; Referee: (Switzerland) Cyril Zimmermann

1 April 2007 Round 25	Basel	4–1	Thun	St. Jakob-Park, Basel
16:00	Smiljanić 12' (1:0); Caicedo 54' (2:0); Rakitić 62' (3:0); Rakitić 82' (4:0)	Summary	(yellow card) 32' Gerber; (yellow card) 53' Deumi; 89' (4:1) Mäkelä	Attendance: 20,655; Referee: (Switzerland) Studer

9 April 2007 Round 26	Zürich	0–1	Basel	Hardturm, Zürich
16:00	Stahel (yellow card) 26'; Raffael (yellow card) 38'; Eudis (yellow card) 54'; Džemaili (yellow card) 77'	Summary	(yellow card) 2' Sterjovski; (yellow card) 53' Ba; 70' (0:1) Rakitić	Attendance: 18,137 (sold out); Referee: (Switzerland) Laperriere

14 April 2007 Round 27	Basel	3–3	St. Gallen	St. Jakob-Park, Basel
17:45	Caicedo 8'; (yellow card) 9' Caicedo; Ergić 36'; Derdiyok 69'; Zanni (yellow card) 82'	Summary	34' Marazzi; 53' (2:2) Alex; 54' (2:3) Alex; (yellow card) 56' Cerrone; (yellow card) 67' Gelabert; (yellow card) 83' Feutchine	Attendance: 25,001; Referee: (Switzerland) René Rogalla

17 April 2007 Round 28	St. Gallen	0–0	Basel	Espenmoos, St. Gallen
20:45	Gelabert (yellow card) 21'; Aguirre (penalty missed) 76′	Summary	(yellow card) 40' Rakitić; (yellow card) 63' Smiljanić; (yellow card) 76' Nakata; (yellow card) 87' Burgmeier	Attendance: 11,300; Referee: (Switzerland) Bertolini

22 April 2007 Round 29	Basel	4–2	Zürich	St. Jakob-Park, Basel
14:00	Rakitić 8' (1:0); Caicedo 32' (2:1); Marque (yellow card) 58'; Rakitić 65' (3:1); Zanni (yellow card) 88'; Majstorović 92' (pen. 4:2)	Summary	24' (1:1) Schneider; (yellow card) 20' Stahel; (yellow card) 23' Abdi; 82' (3:2) Kollar	Attendance: 34,070; Referee: (Switzerland) Cyril Zimmermann

29 April 2007 Round 30	Thun	0–2	Basel	Stadion Lachen, Thun
16:00	Ferreira (yellow card) 21'	Summary	25' (0:1) Smiljanić; (yellow card) 77' Chipperfield; (yellow card) 87' Majstorović; 90' (0:2) Caicedo	Attendance: 6,750; Referee: (Switzerland) Sascha Kever

5 May 2007 Round 31	Basel	2–0	Aarau	St. Jakob-Park, Basel
17:45	Petrić 7' (1:0); Majstorović 90+3' (2:0)	Summary	(yellow card) 11' Carreño; (yellow card) 43' (yellow-red card) 82' Hima	Attendance: 21,085; Referee: (Switzerland) Grossen

9 May 2007 Round 32	Schaffhausen	2–2	Basel	Stadion Breite, Schaffhausen
19:45	El Haimour 11' (1:0); Truckenbrod (yellow card) 24'; De Souza (yellow card) 25'; Montandon 43' (2:0); El Haimour (yellow card) 58'; Rosemir (yellow card) 74'	Summary	(yellow card) 21' Ba; 45' (2:1) Petrić; 59' (2:2) Petrić; (yellow card) 71' Zanni; (yellow card) 90' Nakata	Attendance: 3,900; Referee: (Switzerland) Jérôme Laperrière

13 May 2007 Round 33	Basel	3–0	Grasshoppers	St. Jakob-Park, Basel
16:00	Majstorović 8' (1:0); Ba (yellow card) 22'; Rakitić 54' (2:0); Majstorović 90' (pen. 3:0)	Summary	(yellow card) 90+3' Coltorti	Attendance: 26,625; Referee: (Switzerland) Bertolini

16 May 2007 Round 34	Basel	2–0	Sion	St. Jakob-Park, Basel
19:45	Chipperfield 40' (1:0); Majstorović 56'	Summary	(yellow card) 36' (yellow-red card) 58' Alioui; (yellow card) 43' Chihab; (yellow card) 44' Sarni; (yellow card) 54' Mijadinoski	Attendance: 24,743; Referee: (Switzerland) Wildhaber

19 May 2007 Round 35	Luzern	0–3	Basel	Stadion Allmend, Luzern
17:45	Bader (yellow card) 13'; F. Lustenberger (yellow card) 39'	Summary	4' (0:1) Sterjovski; 10' (0:2) Ergić; 66' (0:3) Rakitić	Attendance: 9,558; Referee: (Switzerland) Massimo Busacca

24 May 2007 Round 36	Basel	2–0	Young Boys	St. Jakob-Park, Basel
20:15	Sterjovski 2' (1:0); Buckley (yellow card) 15'; Eduardo 16' (2:0); Smiljanić (yellow card) 42'; Zanni (yellow card) 52'; Sterjovski (yellow card) 62'	Summary	(yellow card) 15' Varela	Attendance: 31,136; Referee: (Switzerland) Carlo Bertolin

==== Final league table ====
Pos	Team	Pld	W	D	L	GF	GA	GD	Pts	Qualification or relegation
1	Zürich	36	23	6	7	67	32	+35	75	Swiss champions Qualification to Champions League third qualifying round
2	Basel	36	22	8	6	77	40	+37	74	Swiss Cup winners Qualification to UEFA Cup second qualifying round
3	Sion	36	17	9	10	57	42	+15	60	Qualification to UEFA Cup second qualifying round
4	Young Boys	36	17	8	11	52	42	+10	59	Qualification to UEFA Cup first qualifying round
5	St. Gallen	36	14	13	9	47	44	+3	55	Qualification to Intertoto Cup second round
6	Grasshopper	36	13	11	12	54	41	+13	50	
7	Thun	36	10	7	19	30	58	−28	37	
8	Luzern	36	8	9	19	31	58	−27	33	
9	Aarau	36	6	8	22	28	55	−27	26	To relegation play-off
10	Schaffhausen	36	4	13	19	27	58	−31	25	Relegation to Swiss Challenge League

Source: RSSSF
Rules for classification: 1) points; 2) goal difference; 3) number of goals scored.

=== Swiss Cup ===
==== 2006–07 Swiss Cup ====
26 August 2006 Round 1	FC Liestal	1–6	Basel	Stadion Gitterli, Liestal
18:30	Spitz (yellow card) 48'; Wahl 70' (1:6)	Summary	7' (0:1) Cristiano; 12' (0:2) Cristiano; (yellow card) 15' Cristiano; 19' (0:3) Buckley; 21' (0:4) Ergić; 27' (0:5) Cristiano; 66' (0:6) Majstorović	Attendance: 5,150; Referee: (Switzerland) Bruno Grossen

1 October 2006 Round 2	Lugano	0–4	Basel	Stadio Cornaredo, Lugano
14:30	Rota (yellow card) 6'; Mollard (yellow card) 7'; Bullo (yellow card) 43'; Sucic (yellow card) 62'; Silveira (yellow card) 84'	Summary	40' Buckley; (yellow card) 68' Ergić; 77' Caicedo; 77' Petrić; 92' Burgmeier	Referee: (Switzerland) Rogalla

12 November 2006 Round 3	FC Baulmes	2–3 (a.e.t.)	Basel	Stade Sous-Ville, Baulmes
15:00	Drago 51'; Pascucci 71'; Cottens (yellow card) 94'	Summary	(yellow card) 42' Majstorović; (yellow card) 62' Sterjovski; 72' Caicedo; (yellow card) 75' Berner; 79' Petrić; (yellow card) 92' Marque; 103' Sterjovski; (yellow card) 105' Petrić	Attendance: 1,900; Referee: (Switzerland) Rogalla

14 March 2007 Quarter-final	Basel	1–0	Aarau	St. Jakob-Park, Basel
19:45	Sterjovski 1' (1:0); Sterjovski (yellow card) 54'; Zanni (yellow card) 66'	Summary	(yellow card) 33' Brabec; (yellow card) 43' Sermeter	Attendance: 11,280; Referee: (Switzerland) Sascha Kever

26 April 2007 Semi-final	Wil	1–3	Basel	Stadion Bergholz, Wil
18:45	Nushi (yellow card) 41'; Nushi 56' (1:2)	Summary	40' (0:1) Chipperfield; 51' (0:2) Burgmeier; 68' (1:3) Buckley	Attendance: 6,500; Referee: (Switzerland) Wildhaber
Note: Debut for Serdal Kül from Basel youth team

2007 Final	Basel	1–0	Luzern	Stade de Suisse, Wankdorf, Bern
15:00	Majstorović (yellow card) 74'; Majstorović 90+3' (pen.), 1:0'	Summary	(yellow card) 34' Diethelm; (red card) 90+1' Zibung	Attendance: 30,000 (sold out); Referee: (Switzerland) Nicole Petignat

=== UEFA Cup ===
==== Qualifying rounds ====
13 July 2006 First qualifying first leg	Basel (Switzerland)	3–1	(Kazakhstan) Tobol Kostanay	St. Jakob-Park, Basel
20:00	Petrić 20' (1:0); Petrić 67' (pen 2:1); Eduardo 69'	UEFA summary FCB summary	49' Zhumaskaliyev; (yellow card) 63' Meshkov; (yellow card) 66' Mukanov; (yellow card) 79' Morev; (yellow card) 80' Familtsev	Attendance: 11,643; Referee: (Portugal) De Sousa (PFF)

27 July 2006 First qualifying second leg	Tobol Kostanay (Kazakhstan)	0–0	(Switzerland) Basel	Kostanay Central Stadium
15:00	Kharabara (yellow card) 29'; Yurin (yellow card) 60'	UEFA summary FCB summary	(yellow card) 6' Berner; (yellow card) 75' Nakata; (yellow card) 89' Sterjovski	Attendance: 9,000; Referee: (Luxembourg) Luc Wilmes (LUX)

Basel won 3–1 on aggregate.

10 August 2006 Second qualifying first leg	Basel (Switzerland)	1–0	(Liechtenstein) Vaduz	St. Jakob-Park, Basel
20:00	Majstorović 58' (1:0); Ba (yellow card) 69'; Kuzmanović (yellow card) 76'; Chipperfield (yellow card) 90+1'	UEFA summary FCB summary	(yellow card) 6' Hasler; (yellow card) 90+2' Alastra	Attendance: 14,296; Referee: (Czech Republic) Radek Matejek (CZE)

24 August 2006 Second qualifying second leg	Vaduz (Liechtenstein)	2–1	(Switzerland) Basel	Rheinpark Stadion, Vaduz
19:30	López (yellow card) 16'; Sara 49' (1:0); Ritzberger 63' (2:1)	UEFA summary FCB summary	(yellow card) 24' Majstorović; Kuzmanović 56' (1:1)	Attendance: 3,660; Referee: (England) Mark Clattenburg (FA)

2–2 on aggregate, Basel win on away goals

==== First round ====
14 September 2006 First leg	Basel (Switzerland)	6–2	(North Macedonia) Rabotnički	St. Jakob-Park, Basel
20:00	Kuzmanović 2' (1:0); Chipperfield 6' (2:0); Majstorović 58' (pen. 3:0); Petrić 40' (4:0); Petrić (yellow card) 61'; Cristiano 71' (5:0); Cristiano 73' (6:0)	UEFA summary FCB summary	(yellow card) 65' Pejčić; 89' (6:1) Pejčić; 90+4' (o.g. 6:2) Buckley	Attendance: 11,945; Referee: (Romania) Alex Tudor, (FRF)

28 September 2006 Second leg	Rabotnički (North Macedonia)	0–1	(Switzerland) Basel	Gradski Stadion, Skopje
19:30	Vajs (yellow card) 11'	UEFA summary FCB Summary	(yellow card) 70' Petrić; 75' Sterjovski	Attendance: 1,133; Referee: Richards (Wales)

Basel won 7–2 on aggregate.

==== Group stage / Group E ====
19 October 2006 First round	Basel (Switzerland)	1–1	(Netherlands) Feyenoord	St. Jakob-Park, Basel
20:15	Eduardo 60' (1:0); Ba (yellow card) 73'	UEFA summary FCB summary	(yellow card) 12' Léonard; (yellow card) 56' Bahia; 76' (1:1) Huysegems; (yellow card) 90+1' Greene	Attendance: 15,428; Referee: (Scotland) Dougie McDonald (SFA)

2 November 2006 Second round	Blackburn Rovers (England)	3–0	(Switzerland) Basel	Ewood Park, Blackburn
21:00	Gray (yellow card) 65'; Mokoena (yellow card) 68'; Tugay 75' (1:0); Jeffers 89' (pen. 2:0); McCarthy 90+2' (3:0)	UEFA summary FCB summary	(yellow card) 8' Kuzmanović; (yellow card) 64' Costanzo	Attendance: 13,789; Referee: Oleh Orekhov (Ukraine)

23 November 2006 Third round	Basel (Switzerland)	2–2	(France) Nancy	St. Jakob-Park, Basel
20:15	Chipperfield 32' (1:1); Sterjovski 56' (2:2); Costanzo (red card) 90+1'	UEFA summary FCB summary	31' (0:1) Kim; 34' (1:2) Berenguer; (yellow card) 69' Luiz; (penalty missed) 90+3′ Chrétien	Attendance: 14,497; Referee: (Portugal) Bruno Paixão (PFF)

30 November 2006 Fourth round	Wisła Kraków (Poland)	3–1	(Switzerland) Basel	Stadion Wisly Kraków, Kraków
20:45	Pa. Brożek 11' (1:1); Sobolewski (yellow card) 49'; Burns (yellow card) 70'; Jean Paulista 71' (2:1); Pa. Brożek 83' (3:1); Cléber (yellow card) 42' (yellow-red card) 88'	UEFA summary FCB summary	8' (0:1) Petrić; (yellow card) 90+3' Sterjovski	Attendance: 8,000; Referee: Viktor Kassai (Hungary)

==== Group E table ====
Team	Pld	W	D	L	GF	GA	GD	Pts	Qualification
(England) Blackburn Rovers	4	3	1	0	6	1	+5	10	Advance to Round of 32
(France) Nancy	4	2	1	1	7	4	+3	7	Advance to Round of 32
(Netherlands) Feyenoord	4	1	2	1	4	5	−1	5	Advance to Round of 32
(Poland) Wisła Kraków	4	1	0	3	6	8	−2	3	
(Switzerland) Basel	4	0	2	2	4	9	−5	2	

== Sources ==
- Rotblau: Jahrbuch Saison 2015/2016. Publisher: FC Basel Marketing AG. ISBN 978-3-7245-2050-4
- Rotblau: Jahrbuch Saison 2017/2018. Publisher: FC Basel Marketing AG. ISBN 978-3-7245-2189-1
- Die ersten 125 Jahre / 2018. Publisher: Josef Zindel im Friedrich Reinhardt Verlag, Basel. ISBN 978-3-7245-2305-5
- FCB squad 2006–07 at fcb-archiv.ch
- Switzerland 2006–07 at RSSSF
