= Eren Derdiyok =

Swiss footballer (born 1988)

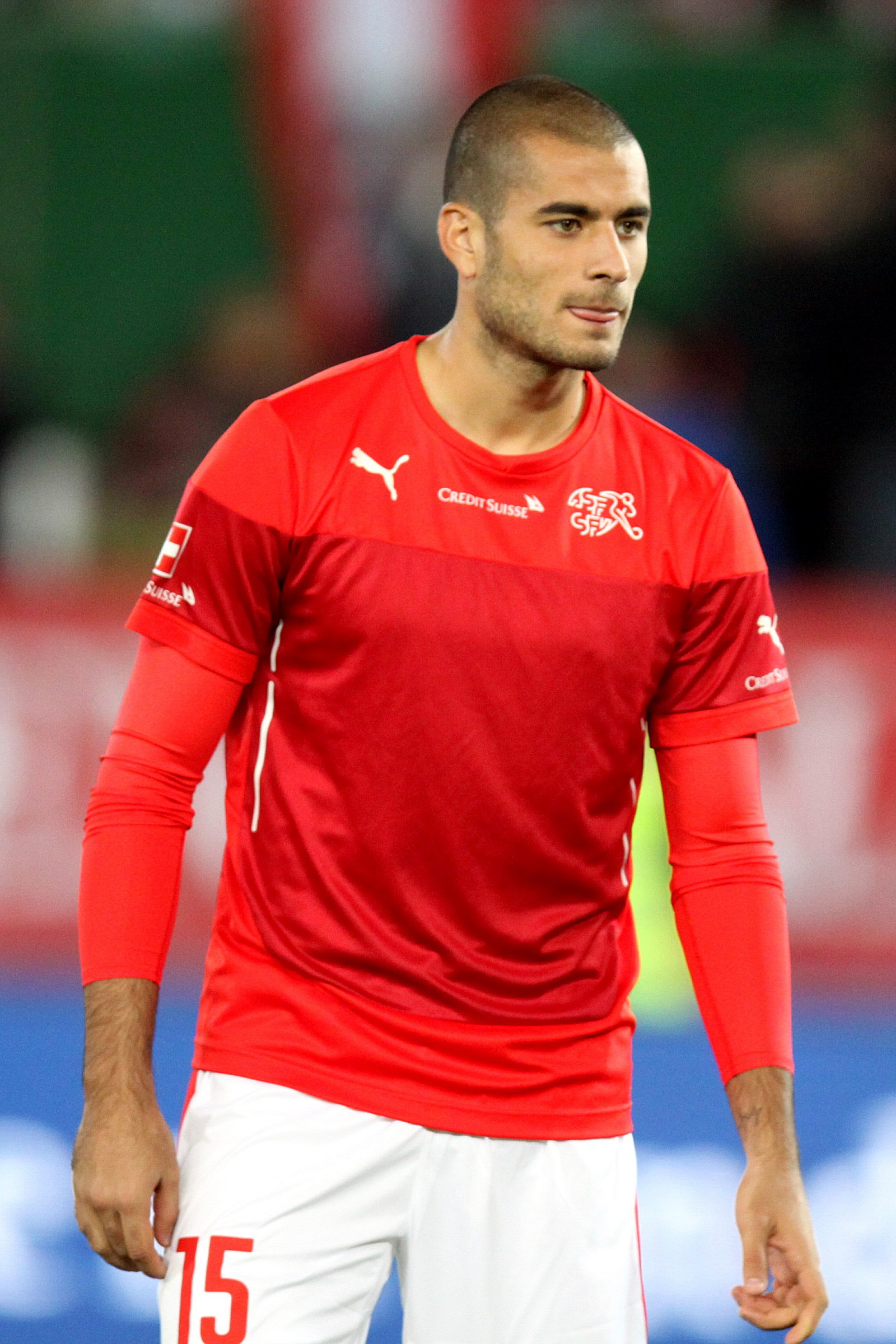
- Derdiyok with Switzerland in 2015

Personal information
- Full name: Eren Derdiyok
- Date of birth: 12 June 1988 (age 38)
- Place of birth: Basel, Switzerland
- Height: 1.91 m (6 ft 3 in)
- Position: Striker

Youth career
- 1994–2005: Old Boys

Senior career*
| Years | Team | Apps | (Gls) |
| 2005–2006 | Old Boys | 18 | (10) |
| 2006 | FC Basel U-21 | 17 | (10) |
| 2007–2009 | FC Basel | 63 | (17) |
| 2009–2012 | Bayer Leverkusen | 90 | (25) |
| 2012–2014 | 1899 Hoffenheim | 19 | (1) |
| 2013–2014 | → Bayer Leverkusen (loan) | 18 | (1) |
| 2014–2016 | Kasımpaşa | 40 | (15) |
| 2016–2019 | Galatasaray | 63 | (20) |
| 2019–2020 | Göztepe | 5 | (0) |
| 2020–2021 | Pakhtakor FC | 29 | (12) |
| 2021–2023 | Ankaragücü | 32 | (10) |
| 2023–2024 | Schaffhausen | 4 | (0) |
| Total | | 398 | (121) |

International career
| 2006–2007 | Switzerland U19 | 7 | (7) |
| 2007–2009 | Switzerland U21 | 7 | (8) |
| 2008–2018 | Switzerland | 60 | (11) |
- * Club domestic league appearances and goals

Eren Derdiyok (born 12 June 1988) is a Swiss former professional footballer who played as a striker. He is a former Swiss international. Derdiyok has played for ten different clubs in Europe, as well as a one year stint in Uzbekistan's capital with Pakhtakor FC.

== Early life ==
Derdiyok was born in Basel, Switzerland, into a Kurdish family from Silvan, Diyarbakır, Turkey. He also holds Turkish citizenship.

== Club career ==
=== Old Boys Basel ===
From an early age Derdiyok played his youth football for the Basel local football club BSC Old Boys Basel and advanced through the ranks. In summer 2005 he advanced from their U-18 team to the first team, who played in the Swiss 1. Liga the fourth tier of Swiss football. He immediately became regular player and scored 10 goals in just 18 appearances in the first half of the season. In the second round of the 2005–06 Swiss Cup OB were drawn at home in the Schützenmatte against FC Basel. The match took place on 22 October and Basel walked away with a 6–1 victory. It was Derdiyok who scored the consolation goal.

=== Basel ===
Basel's head coach Christian Gross noticed Derdiyok's goal scoring instinct and persuaded him to join the club for their 2006–07 season. Derdiyok joined Basel's U-21 team, who played in the third tier. Under team coach Heinz Hermann, the striker scored 10 goals in 17 appearances in just six months. Derdiyok was then called up by Gross into Basel's first team. After playing in five test games, in which he netted six times, he played his domestic league debut for the club, coming on as substitute in the 82nd minute, in the away game in the Stadion Wankdorf on 11 February 2007 as Basel won 3–0 against Young Boys. The next match for Basel was a transfer supplement match against Derdiyok's former club Old Boys which Basel won 6–1, with Derdiyok scoring a hat-trick within less than an hour.

He scored his first league goal for his new club on 14 April in the home game in the St. Jakob-Park as Basel played a 3–3 draw with St. Gallen. At the end of the 2006–07 Super League season Basel were runners-up, one point behind championship winners Zürich. During the second half of the season Derdiyok was used mainly as a substitute, playing only one full game, and averaging a total of 220 play minutes. In the Swiss Cup Basel advanced to the final, where they played Luzern. Derdiyok was in the starting eleven, substituted out after 58 minutes, but the game was won 1–0 thanks to a penalty goal in the third minute of added time.

For Derdiyok, the 2007–08 season proved to be a lot more fruitful and he received more regular playing time. Basel played in the 2007–08 UEFA Cup. Winning both matches in the qualification round and both matches in the play-off round, they advanced to the group stage, which they ended undefeated in second position, to continue the knockout stage. But then they were eliminated here by Sporting CP. Derdiyok had seven appearances in the ten games. In his first league match of the season, an away game at the Espenmoos Derdiyok scored a brace as Basel won 3–0 against St. Gallen. He scored his first hat-trick in the away match on 2 March 2008 as Basel won 3–1 against FC Thun. At the end of the 2007–08 season, he won the Double with the club. They won the League Championship title with four points advantage over second placed Young Boys. Derdiyok had 27 league appearances, scoring seven times. In the Swiss Cup via FC Léchelles, SC Binningen, Grasshopper Club, Stade Nyonnais and in the semi-final Thun, Basel advanced to the final, and winning this 4–1 against AC Bellinzona they won the competition. In the final, on 6 April 2008, Derdiyok was in the starting eleven and he netted the first goal of the game.

To the beginning of the 2008–09 season, he was member of the Basel team that won the Uhrencup. They beat Legia Warsaw 6–1 and played a 2–2 draw with Borussia Dortmund to end the table on top slot above Dortmund and Luzern. Basel joined the 2008–09 UEFA Champions League in the second qualifying round and with an aggregate score of 5–3 they eliminated IFK Göteborg. In the next round they played against Vitória de Guimarães, but the first leg ended in a goalless draw. In the second leg in the St. Jakob-Park on 27 August 2008, despite an early Basel lead, Vitória equalised in the 14th minute. After half time, Derdiyok scored the winning goal, and with a 2–1 win they eliminated Vitória, and advanced to the group stage. Here Basel were matched with Barcelona, Sporting CP and Shakhtar Donetsk, but ended the group in last position winning just one point after a 1–1 draw in Camp Nou. Derdiyok scored the Basel equaliser. At the end of the 2008–09 Super League season Basel were third in the table, seven points behind new champions Zürich and one adrift of runners-up Young Boys. In the 2008–09 Swiss Cup, Basel advanced via Schötz, Bulle, Thun and Zurich to the semi-finals. But here they were stopped by YB. After a goalless 90 minutes and extra time, YB decided the penalty shoot-out 3–2 and advanced to the final to become runners-up, as Sion became cup winners.

Derdiyok left the club at the end of the season. During his two and a half years with the team, Derdiyok played a total of 119 games for Basel scoring a total of 43 goals. 63 of these games were in the Swiss Super League, 11 in the Swiss Cup, 16 in the UEFA competitions (Champions League and UEFA Cup) and 29 were friendly games. He scored 17 goals in the domestic league, six in the cup, two in the European games and the other 16 were scored during the test games.

=== Bayer Leverkusen ===
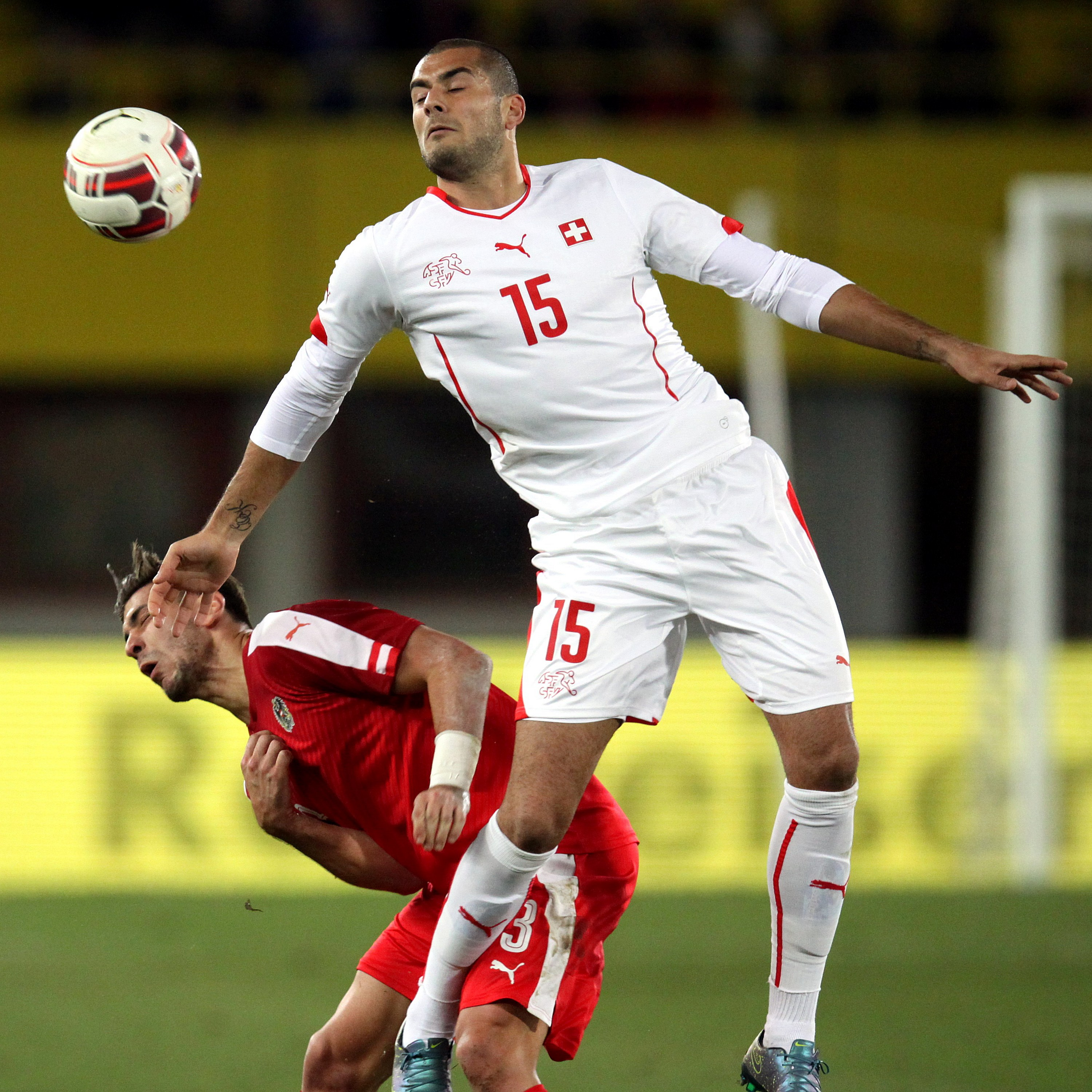
Derdiyok in action against Austria in 2015

On 28 May 2009, Bayer Leverkusen secured Derdiyok's signature, committing him to a four-year contract until 30 June 2013, after attracting major European clubs attention, including Galatasaray and some Serie A clubs, he finally joined his Swiss teammate Tranquillo Barnetta. Prior moving to Bayer 04 Leverkusen, Derdiyok was linked with joining English side Everton but he however rejected a move, stating he is adamant that he is eager to make a proposed summer switch to Leverkusen. Derdiyok made his debut in the DFB-Pokal on 31 July in a match against SV Babelsberg 03, he scored the winning goal in the 67th minute to make the score 1–0. On 8 August 2009, he scored his first goal in the league on his league debut in a 2–2 draw against Mainz 05. He replaced the long-term absentee Patrick Helmes in the starting lineup. His goals contributed to the fact that Bayer Leverkusen was ranked first after the first leg of this season. In the end, Bayer finished fourth this season, qualifying for the 2010–11 UEFA Europa League. During the 2009–10 season, Derdiyok scored 12 goals in 33 Bundesliga matches.

In the first half of his second season, Derdiyok again was a regular in the starting lineup, but was increasingly used as a substitute in the second leg of this season. He played alternately with Stefan Kießling. On 14 August 2010, Derdiyok scored his first goal of 2010–11 season debut when scoring twice against FK Pirmasens for an 11–1 win in the DFB-Pokal. On matchday 2 of the Bundesliga, Derdiyok scored in the league-match against Borussia Mönchengladbach. Derdiyok scored six goals in 32 Bundesliga matches. In his third and final season, Derdiyok scored his first goal of 2011–12 season in a DFB-Pokal against Dynamo Dresden but only to lose 4–3 after extra time. On 1 October 2011, Derdiyok scored in a 3–1 win over VfL Wolfsburg when he stretched to take down a long pass at the edge of the box, flipped the ball back over his head with two defenders around him and buried it in the back of the net with an overhead kick. On 23 November 2011, he scored a headed equalizing goal against Chelsea in the group stage of the Champions League. Bayer Leverkusen went on to win this match 2–1 as Manuel Friedrich scored the winning goal. Bayer Leverkusen qualified for the last 16 of this competition. Three days later, playing away in a draw 3–3 with the Hertha BSC in the Bundesliga, Derdiyok scored his first hat-trick with Leverkusen. Later this season Derdiyok ended up in the hospital, needing seven stitches for a cut that he suffered in a freak injury when he knocked over the glass in which he keeps his toothbrush and then overlooked a shard of glass and cut his foot open on it. His injury made him miss three weeks; he returned from injury when he was on the bench in a match against 1. FC Köln but he wasn't fit enough to play. Derdiyok made his return in a match against FC Bayern Munich where Derdiyok provided an assist for Stefan Kießling. The 2–0 win ended a spate of 14 matches of Bayer Leverkusen without a win against Bayern Munich. In the 2011–12 Bundesliga, Derdiyok scored seven goals.

=== Hoffenheim ===
In April 2012, TSG 1899 Hoffenheim have confirmed their interests signing Derdiyok. On 2 May 2012, Derdiyok signed a contract for TSG 1899 Hoffenheim for the 2012–13 season until June 2016. He transferred for an unknown price tag. Hoffenheim had been looking for a new striker since the winter transfer window when the then injured Vedad Ibišević joined VfB Stuttgart in the winter transfer window. On 21 July 2012, Derdiyok scored on his debut for Hoffenheim, a 2–0 win against SV Waldhof Mannheim. He made his league debut in the opening game of the season, setting up a goal in a 2–1 loss against Borussia Mönchengladbach. Derdiyok would struggle to score his first goal until matchday 11 (on 18 November 2012) in a 3–1 loss against Wolfsburg. However, his poor performance at Hoffenheim was criticised that Markus Babbel regretted signing him and Tim Wiese. Following this, Derdiyok's playing time was soon reduced. Derdiyok would also be demoted to the reserve side because his higher wages were affecting the club's finance and he was no longer included in the first team under manager Markus Gisdol. Then, Derdiyok suffered an abdominal problems, which ruled him out for the 2012–13 season. Derdiyok quoted admitting about his move: "We have to be ashamed of us, especially me. We cannot play the remaining games in such a way. I earn my bread here, I have to give something in return."

After one season with Hoffenheim, Derdiyok was among nine players to be left out for the club's training camp ahead of the 2013–14 season. Derdiyok told Sport1 in an interview, quoting: "We have all disappointed. It can not be that I'm the bogeyman. Things were promised to him, "have not been complied with at the end. There has been much done wrong." After being told by Switzerland's manager Ottmar Hitzfeld to leave as soon as possible. Derdiyok found himself being linked with Hamburg. Derdiyok was sent to the club's reserve side by Manager Gisdol.

=== Return to Bayer Leverkusen (loan) ===
On 30 August 2013, Derdiyok returned to Bayer Leverkusen on a season long loan until the end of the 2013–14 season. Upon his loan move, Derdiyok vowed: "I will be as strong as never before!"

However, Derdiyok featured less and only appeared on the bench instead. Manager Sami Hyypiä quoted on Derdiyok about his recent attitude: "Eren must focus even more, then he is a very good player. He has quality. We all need to help him get this quality." After the end of the 2013–14 season, Derdiyok's loan spell with the club came to an end and he returned to Hoffenheim.

=== Kasımpaşa ===
A few days after the end of Bundesliga season, Derdiyok left Hoffenheim to join Süper Lig Turkish side Kasımpaşa ahead of a new season. Derdiyok cited moving to Turkey as "target and ideal" Derdiyok would spend the next three seasons at the Istanbul club.

=== Galatasaray ===
Derdiyok signed a three-year contract with Turkish club Galatasaray on 5 August 2016 for an initial fee of €4 million.

=== Göztepe ===
On 10 July 2019, Derdiyok completed a free transfer with Göztepe on a two-year deal with an option to extend by an additional season.

=== Ankaragücü ===
On 23 January 2023, Derdiyok's contract with Ankaragücü was terminated.

=== FC Schaffhausen ===
On 23 June 2023, FC Schaffhausen presented Derdiyok as their new striker. On 3 January 2024, Derdiyok announced his retirement from professional football, after managing only four games in the six months at Schaffhausen. However, he will remain at the club, acting as assistant to head coach Christian Wimmer, while pursuing his own coaching license.

== International career ==
Derdiyok made his international debut for Switzerland on 6 February 2008, as a second-half substitute against England at Wembley Stadium in London. He scored with his first touch of the ball to equalise, but they eventually lost 2–1. He was named as part of the Switzerland squad to play at UEFA Euro 2008 and was the youngest player at the tournament at 19 years old. He made a big impact at the tournament and became better known because of it. He was also in the Switzerland 23-man squad for the 2010 World Cup where he played twice. On 26 May 2012, Derdiyok scored his first ever international hat-trick as Switzerland beat Germany to win 5–3 in a friendly at St. Jakob-Park in Basel.

As a result of his performance in his club career, Derdiyok was not included in the squad for the 2014 FIFA World Cup by manager Ottmar Hitzfeld.

His performances improved for Kasımpaşa, which resulted in him being included in the squad for Euro 2016.

== Career statistics ==
=== Club ===
As of match played 4 September 2022

Appearances and goals by club, season and competition
| Club | Season | League | | | National cup (Note: Includes Swiss Cup, DFB-Pokal, Turkish Cup, Uzbek Cup) | | Continental | | Other | | Total | |
| Club | Season | Division | Apps | Goals | Apps | Goals | Apps | Goals | Apps | Goals | Apps | Goals |
|---|---|---|---|---|---|---|---|---|---|---|---|---|
| FC Basel | 2006–07 | Swiss Super League | 12 | 1 | 2 | 0 | 2 (Note: Appearances in UEFA Cup) | 0 | — | | 16 | 1 |
| FC Basel | 2007–08 | Swiss Super League | 27 | 7 | 5 | 3 | 5 | 0 | — | | 37 | 10 |
| FC Basel | 2008–09 | Swiss Super League | 24 | 9 | 4 | 3 | 9 (Note: Appearances in UEFA Champions League) | 2 | — | | 37 | 14 |
| FC Basel | Total | | 63 | 17 | 11 | 6 | 16 | 2 | — | | 90 | 25 |
| Bayer Leverkusen | 2009–10 | Bundesliga | 33 | 12 | 2 | 1 | 0 | 0 | — | | 35 | 13 |
| Bayer Leverkusen | 2010–11 | Bundesliga | 32 | 6 | 2 | 3 | 10 (Note: Appearances in UEFA Europa League) | 2 | — | | 44 | 11 |
| Bayer Leverkusen | 2011–12 | Bundesliga | 25 | 7 | 1 | 1 | 7 | 2 | — | | 33 | 10 |
| Bayer Leverkusen | Total | | 90 | 25 | 5 | 5 | 17 | 4 | — | | 112 | 34 |
| 1899 Hoffenheim | 2012–13 | Bundesliga | 19 | 1 | 1 | 0 | — | | — | | 20 | 1 |
| Bayer Leverkusen (loan) | 2013–14 | Bundesliga | 18 | 1 | 3 | 0 | 5 | 0 | — | | 26 | 1 |
| Kasımpaşa | 2014–15 | Süper Lig | 7 | 2 | 0 | 0 | — | | — | | 7 | 2 |
| Kasımpaşa | 2015–16 | Süper Lig | 32 | 13 | 1 | 1 | — | | — | | 34 | 14 |
| Kasımpaşa | Total | | 40 | 15 | 1 | 1 | — | | — | | 41 | 16 |
| Galatasaray | 2016–17 | Süper Lig | 31 | 10 | 6 | 2 | — | | 1 (Note: Appearance in Turkish Super Cup) | 0 | 38 | 12 |
| Galatasaray | 2017–18 | Süper Lig | 19 | 3 | 7 | 1 | 2 | 0 | — | | 28 | 4 |
| Galatasaray | 2018–19 | Süper Lig | 13 | 7 | 0 | 0 | 4 | 2 | 1 | 1 | 18 | 10 |
| Galatasaray | Total | | 63 | 20 | 13 | 3 | 6 | 2 | 2 | 1 | 84 | 26 |
| Göztepe | 2019–20 | Süper Lig | 5 | 0 | 4 | 3 | — | | — | | 9 | 3 |
| Pakhtakor | 2020 | Uzbekistan Super League | 22 | 9 | 4 | 3 | 8 (Note: Appearances in AFC Champions League) | 2 | — | | 34 | 14 |
| Pakhtakor | 2021 | Uzbekistan Super League | 7 | 3 | 1 | 0 | 5 | 1 | 1 (Note: Appearance in Uzbekistan Super Cup) | 0 | 14 | 4 |
| Pakhtakor | Total | | 29 | 12 | 5 | 3 | 13 | 3 | 1 | 0 | 48 | 18 |
| Ankaragücü | 2021–22 | TFF First League | 31 | 10 | 0 | 0 | — | | — | | 31 | 10 |
| Ankaragücü | 2022–23 | Süper Lig | 1 | 0 | 0 | 0 | — | | — | | 1 | 0 |
| Ankaragücü | Total | | 32 | 10 | 0 | 0 | — | | — | | 32 | 10 |
| Career total | | | 359 | 101 | 43 | 21 | 57 | 11 | 3 | 1 | 462 | 134 |

=== International ===
Scores and results list Switzerland's and Switzerland U21's goal tally first, score column indicates score after each Derdiyok goal.

List of international goals scored by Eren Derdiyok
| No. | Date | Venue | Opponent | Score | Result | Competition |
Switzerland goals
| 1 | 6 February 2008 | London, England | England | 1–1 | 1–2 | Friendly |
| 2 | 9 September 2009 | Riga, Latvia | Latvia | 2–2 | 2–2 | 2010 FIFA World Cup qualification |
| 3 | 10 August 2011 | Vaduz, Liechtenstein | Liechtenstein | 1–0 | 1–2 | Friendly |
| 4 | 11 October 2011 | Basel, Switzerland | Montenegro | 1–0 | 2–0 | UEFA Euro 2012 qualifying |
| 5 | 26 May 2012 | Basel, Switzerland | Germany | 1–0 | 5–3 | Friendly |
| 6 | 26 May 2012 | Basel, Switzerland | Germany | 2–0 | 5–3 | Friendly |
| 7 | 26 May 2012 | Basel, Switzerland | Germany | 3–1 | 5–3 | Friendly |
| 8 | 14 November 2012 | Sousse, Tunisia | Tunisia | 1–0 | 2–1 | Friendly |
| 9 | 9 October 2015 | St. Gallen, Switzerland | San Marino | 7–0 | 7–0 | UEFA Euro 2016 qualifying |
| 10 | 13 November 2015 | Trnava, Slovakia | Slovakia | 1–3 | 2–3 | Friendly |
| 11 | 13 November 2016 | Lucerne, Switzerland | Faroe Islands | 1–0 | 2–0 | 2018 FIFA World Cup qualification |
Switzerland U21 goals
| 1 | 22 August 2007 | Kortrijk, Belgium | Belgium | 2–0 | 2–1 | Friendly |
| 2 | 8 September 2007 | Wohlen, Switzerland | North Macedonia | 1–0 | 1–1 | 2009 UEFA European Under-21 Football Championship qualification |
| 3 | 12 October 2007 | Fredrikstad, Norway | Norway | 1–2 | 1–2 | 2009 UEFA European Under-21 Football Championship qualification |
| 4 | 16 October 2007 | Tallinn, Estonia | Estonia | 1–0 | 4–0 | 2009 UEFA European Under-21 Football Championship qualification |
| 5 | 16 October 2007 | Tallinn, Estonia | Estonia | 2–0 | 4–0 | 2009 UEFA European Under-21 Football Championship qualification |
| 6 | 17 November 2007 | Delemont, Switzerland | Estonia | 1–0 | 5–0 | 2009 UEFA European Under-21 Football Championship qualification |
| 7 | 17 November 2007 | Delemont, Switzerland | Estonia | 4–0 | 5–0 | 2009 UEFA European Under-21 Football Championship qualification |
| 8 | 5 June 2009 | Wil, Switzerland | Armenia | 1–0 | 2–1 | 2011 UEFA European Under-21 Football Championship qualification |

== Honours ==
Basel

- Swiss Super League: 2006–07, 2007–08
- Swiss Cup: 2007–08

Galatasaray

- Süper Lig: 2017–18, 2018–19
- Turkish Cup: 2018–19
- Turkish Super Cup: 2016

Pakhtakor

- Uzbekistan Super League: 2020
- Uzbekistan Cup: 2020
- Uzbekistan Super Cup: 2021

Ankaragücü

- TFF First League: 2021–22

Individual

- Swiss Super League Youngster of the Year: 2007–08

== Sources ==
- Die ersten 125 Jahre. Publisher: Josef Zindel im Friedrich Reinhardt Verlag, Basel. ISBN 978-3-7245-2305-5
- Verein "Basler Fussballarchiv" Homepage
