= Serdal =

Serdal is a Turkish given name for males. It is directly derived from the name Serdar and is used interchangeably of each other. People named Serdal include:

- Serdal Güvenç, Turkish footballer
- Serdal Kül, Turkish footballer
