= Delron Buckley =

South African bruinou footballer

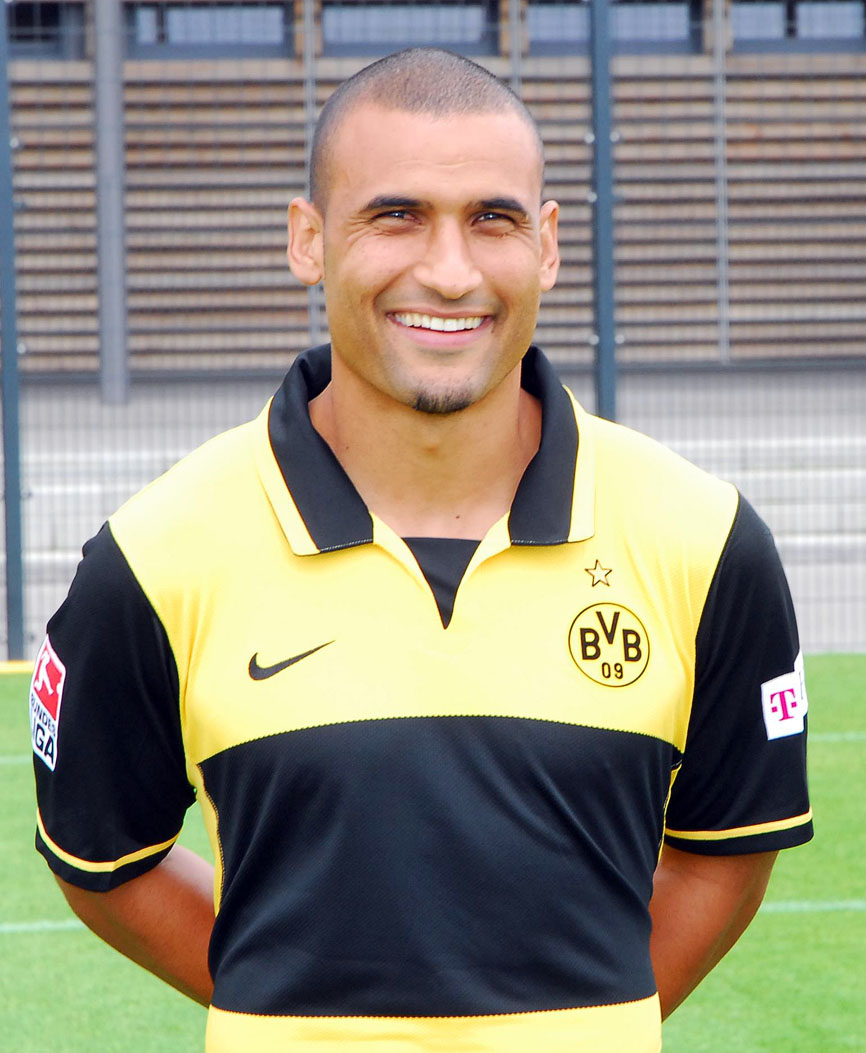
- Buckley with Borussia Dortmund in 2007

Personal information
- Full name: Delron Sebastian Buckley
- Date of birth: 7 December 1977 (age 48)
- Place of birth: Durban, South Africa
- Height: 1.77 m (5 ft 10 in)
- Position: Winger

Youth career
- 1994–1995: Butcherfille Rovers Durban
- 1995–: VfL Bochum

Senior career*
Years	Team	Apps	(Gls)
–1998	VfL Bochum II		
1995–2004	VfL Bochum	177	(20)
2004–2005	Arminia Bielefeld	29	(15)
2005–2009	Borussia Dortmund	59	(1)
2006–2007	→ Basel (loan)	22	(1)
2008–2009	Borussia Dortmund II	2	(0)
2009	→ Mainz 05 (loan)	12	(1)
2009–2010	Anorthosis Famagusta	20	(2)
2011–2012	Karlsruher SC	34	(2)
2012–2014	Maritzburg United	43	(3)
Total		398	(45)

International career
1998–2012	South Africa	73	(10)

Managerial career
- 2020–2021: Maritzburg United
- 2021–2023: KwaZulu-Natal; Soccer Team (assistant coach)
- * Club domestic league appearances and goals

Delron Sebastian Buckley (born 7 December 1977) is a South African former professional soccer player. His preferred position was the left wing although he could also play as a striker. In September 2021, he was appointed Head Coach of the University of KwaZulu-Natal soccer team.

== Playing career ==
Born in Durban, Buckley's football career began with his local team Butcherfille Rovers Durban. At the age of 17 he was signed by German club VfL Bochum. Buckley spent most of his career in Germany, going through Bochum's youth teams and debuting in the Bundesliga in 1995. Buckley finally broke into the first squad in 1998 and remained a starter for much of his time at Bochum.

Having spent nine professional seasons with Bochum, Buckley left in 2004 for Arminia Bielefeld where he enjoyed his most successful season personally, scoring 15 goals and helping the team avoid relegation. Buckley quickly picked up interest from higher-rated clubs. After only one season at Bielefeld, Buckley joined Borussia Dortmund for a reported transfer fee of €425,000, and signed a four-year contract.

Buckley's first season at Borussia Dortmund was largely unsuccessful as he failed to score in 28 league matches. Widely regarded as bad signing, Buckley was loaned to Swiss club FC Basel 1893.

He joined Basel's first team during their 2006–07 season under head coach Christian Gross, who was starting his eighth season in that position. Gross relied on Buckley from the first moment and he played his team debut in the Swiss Cup away game on 26 August. He also scored his first goal with the team in the same game as Basel won 6–1 against local amateur club FC Liestal. He played his domestic league debut for Basel on 10 September 2006 at home in the St. Jakob-Park as Basel won 2–1 against FC Zürich. In the first round of the 2006–07 UEFA Cup Basel won 7–2 on aggregate against FK Rabotnički to qualified for the group stage. Here Basel played their first match at home against Feyenoord, this ended in a 1–1 draw. The second was away and lost 3–0 away against Blackburn Rovers. At home against AS Nancy the match was drawn 2–2 and the final game ended with a 3–1 defeat against Wisła Kraków. Basel ended the group stage in last position in the table and were eliminated. Bukley played in all six of these matches. At the end of the 2006–07 Super League season Basel were runners-up, one point behind championship winners Zürich. In the Swiss Cup Basel advanced to the final, beating FC Liestal in the first round, Lugano, FC Baulmes, Aarau and Wil in the semi-final. In the final they played Luzern and won this 1–0 thanks to a penalty goal in the third minute of added time. In his loan period with the club, Buckley played a total of 41 games for Basel scoring a total of six goals. 22 of these games were in the Swiss Super League, five in the Swiss Cup, six in the UEFA Cup and eight were friendly games. He scored one goal in the domestic league, three in the cup and the other three were scored during the test games.

After returning to Dortmund in July 2007, Buckley was able to regain his place in the Borussia squad for the 2007–08 season, but fell out of favour after the arrival of new manager Jürgen Klopp.

In February 2009, he signed for 1. FSV Mainz 05 for the remainder of the season and was released on 30 June 2009. He then moved to Cyprian club Anorthosis Famagusta FC where he played until the end of 2010–11 season.

In January 2011, he transferred to 2. Bundesliga team Karlsruher SC.

On 26 June 2012, he signed for Maritzburg United, playing for the first time in his career in South Africa.

Buckley announced his retirement as an active player in 2015.

== International career ==
Buckley made his international debut for the South Africa national team in a friendly against Zambia on 20 May 1998. He played 73 games and scored 10 goals for South Africa. Buckley represented his country at the 1998 FIFA World Cup, 2002 FIFA World Cup and the 2004 African Nations Cup.

== Managerial career ==
In 2020, he was appointed head coach of Maritzburg United.

After one season, he became assistant coach of KwaZulu Football Team. Due to an altercation with a match official, he was suspended from University Football for five years in January 2024.

== Career statistics ==
Scores and results list South Africa's goal tally first, score column indicates score after each Buckley goal.

List of international goals scored by Delron Buckley
No.	Date	Venue	Opponent	Score	Result	Competition
1	18 June 2000	Johann van Riebeeck Stadium, Witbank, South Africa	Swaziland	1–0	2–0	2000 COSAFA Cup
2	18 June 2000	Johann van Riebeeck Stadium, Witbank, South Africa	Swaziland	2–0	2–0	2000 COSAFA Cup
3	9 July 2000	National Sports Stadium, Harare, Zimbabwe	Zimbabwe	1–0	2–0	2002 FIFA World Cup qualification
4	9 July 2000	National Sports Stadium, Harare, Zimbabwe	Zimbabwe	1–0	2–0	2002 FIFA World Cup qualification
5	13 January 2001	Sir Anerood Jugnauth Stadium, Belle Vue, Mauritius	Mauritius	1–0	1–1	2002 African Nations Cup qualification
6	27 March 2002	Lokomotivi Stadium, Tbilisi, Georgia	Georgia	1–2	1–4	Friendly
7	12 October 2002	Vodacom Park, Bloemfontein, South Africa	Burundi	1–0	1–0	2004 African Nations Cup qualification
8	4 June 2005	Estádio da Várzea, Praia, Cape Verde	Cape Verde	1–0	1–1	2006 World Cup qualification
9	17 August 2005	Laugardalsvöllur, Reykjavík, Iceland	Iceland	1–1	1–4	Friendly
10	24 March 2007	Stade Omnisports Idriss Mahamat Ouya, N'Djamena, Chad	Chad	1–0	3–0	2008 African Nations Cup qualification

== Honours ==
Borussia Dortmund

- DFB-Pokal runner-up: 2007–08
