= 2010–11 FC Luzern season =

FC Luzern
- Chairman: Walter Stierli
- Manager: Rolf Fringer
- Stadium: Stadion Gersag
- Swiss Super League: 6th
- Swiss Cup: Round 3
- UEFA Europa League: Third qualifying round
- Top goalscorer: League: Hakan Yakin (12); All: Hakan Yakin (12)
- Average home league attendance: 7,993
- Biggest win: Luzern 4–0 St. Gallen; Luzern 6–2 Bellinzona; St. Gallen 0–4 Luzern
- Biggest defeat: Luzern 0–5 Zürich
Home colours	Away colours

The 2010–11 season was the 86th season in the history of Fussball-Club Luzern and the club's fifth consecutive season in the top flight of Swiss football.

== Players ==
=== First-team squad ===
Note: Flags indicate national team as defined under FIFA eligibility rules; some limited exceptions apply. Players may hold more than one non-FIFA nationality.

No.	Pos.	Nation	Player
1	GK	SUI	David Zibung
2	DF	SUI	Daniel Fanger
3	DF	NGR	Adekunle Lukmon
4	DF	SWE	Benjamin Kibebe
5	MF	SUI	Michel Renggli
6	DF	CRO	Tomislav Puljić
7	DF	SUI	Claudio Lustenberger
8	MF	AUT	Thomas Prager
10	FW	SUI	Hakan Yakin (Captain)
11	MF	SUI	Daniel Gygax
13	DF	SUI	Christophe Lambert
14	FW	POR	João Paiva

No.	Pos.	Nation	Player
15	FW	SUI	Janko Pacar
16	FW	ROU	Cristian Ianu
17	DF	SRB	Dušan Veškovac
19	DF	MNE	Elsad Zverotić
21	MF	SUI	Nelson Ferreira
22	MF	KOS	Burim Kukeli
24	MF	SUI	Alain Wiss
25	FW	SUI	Nico Siegrist
26	FW	CRO	Dejan Sorgić
28	DF	POR	Sava Bento
30	GK	SUI	Gabriel Wüthrich

== Pre-season and friendlies ==
Win Draw Loss

19 June 2010 Friendly	Luzern (Switzerland)	1–1	(Switzerland) St. Gallen	Switzerland
17:20 CEST (UTC+2)

23 June 2010 Friendly	Zürich (Switzerland)	1–0	(Switzerland) Luzern	Switzerland
19:30 CEST (UTC+2)

2 July 2010 Friendly	Luzern (Switzerland)	3–3	(Switzerland) Kriens	Switzerland
20:00 CEST (UTC+2)

== Competitions ==
=== Overall record ===
Competition	First match	Last match	Starting round	Final position	Record							
Competition	First match	Last match	Starting round	Final position	Pld	W	D	L	GF	GA	GD	Win %
Swiss Super League	18 July 2010	25 May 2011	Matchday 1	6th	36	13	9	14	62	57	+5	36.11
Swiss Cup	19 September 2010	21 November 2010	Round 1	Round 3	3	2	1	0	7	3	+4	66.67
UEFA Europa League	29 July 2010	5 August 2010	Third qualifying round	Third qualifying round	2	0	0	2	1	4	−3	0.00
Total					41	15	10	16	70	64	+6	36.59

Source: Competitions

=== Swiss Super League ===
==== League table ====
Pos	Team	Pld	W	D	L	GF	GA	GD	Pts	Qualification or relegation
4	Sion	36	15	9	12	47	36	+11	54	Qualification to Europa League play-off round (Note: By winning the 2010–11 Swiss Cup were won the qualification to Europa League play-off round. However, after the two play-off games had been played the following season, the team was disqualified from the Europa League following Celtic's successful protest over the team's use of ineligible players.)
5	Thun	36	11	16	9	48	43	+5	49	Qualification to Europa League second qualifying round
6	Luzern	36	13	9	14	62	57	+5	48	
7	Grasshopper	36	10	11	15	45	54	−9	41	
8	Neuchâtel Xamax	36	8	8	20	44	67	−23	32	

Source: Super League
Rules for classification: 1) points; 2) goal difference; 3) number of goals scored.

==== Results summary ====
Overall								Home						Away					
Pld	W	D	L	GF	GA	GD	Pts	W	D	L	GF	GA	GD	W	D	L	GF	GA	GD
36	13	9	14	62	57	+5	48	8	5	5	32	25	+7	5	4	9	30	32	−2

Source: Swiss Super League

==== Results by round ====
Round	1	2	3	4	5	6	7	8	9	10	11	12	13	14	15	16	17	18	19	20	21	22	23	24	25	26	27	28	29	30	31	32	33	34	35	36
Ground	H	A	H	H	A	A	H	H	A	A	H	A	A	H	H	A	A	H	A	H	A	H	A	H	A	H	H	A	H	H	A	H	A	A	H	A
Result	W	D	W	L	W	W	D	W	D	W	W	L	L	D	W	D	W	D	L	W	L	L	D	W	L	D	L	L	L	W	L	D	L	W	L	L
Position																																				

Source: Swiss Super League
A = Away; H = Home; W = Win; D = Draw; L = Loss

==== Matches ====
18 July 2010 Round 1	Luzern	4–0	St. Gallen	Lucerne
16:00 CEST (UTC+2)		Report		Stadium: Stadion Gersag; Attendance: 8,013; Referee: (Switzerland) Jérôme Laperrière

24 July 2010 Round 2	Young Boys	1–1	Luzern	Bern
17:45 CET (UTC+1)		Report		Stadium: Stade de Suisse; Attendance: 22,590; Referee: (Switzerland) Claudio Circhetta

1 August 2010 Round 3	Luzern	4–2	Neuchâtel Xamax	Lucerne
16:00 CEST (UTC+2)		Report		Stadium: Stadion Gersag; Attendance: 7,156; Referee: (Switzerland) Nikolaj Hänni

8 August 2010 Round 4	Luzern	2–3	Sion	Lucerne
13:45 CEST (UTC+2)		Report		Stadium: Stadion Gersag; Attendance: 7,783; Referee: (Switzerland) Adrien Jaccottet

14 August 2010 Round 5	Basel	1–4	Luzern	St. Jakob-Park, Basel
17:45	Chipperfield (yellow card) 45'; Costanzo (red card) 52'; Tembo 90' (1:4) (yellow card) 64'	Summary	13' (0:1) Gygax; (yellow card) 25' Puljić; (yellow card) 31' Ferreira; 33' (0:2) Yakin; 55' (pen. 0:3) Yakin; (yellow card) 59' Lustenberger; (yellow card) 64' Gygax; (yellow card) 66' Zibung; 72' (0:4) Pacar	Attendance: 29,049; Referee: (Switzerland) Massimo Busacca

22 August 2010 Round 6	Grasshopper	0–3	Luzern	Zürich
16:00 CEST (UTC+2)		Report		Stadium: Letzigrund; Attendance: 5,500; Referee: (Switzerland) Damien Carrel

29 August 2010 Round 7	Luzern	1–1	Thun	Lucerne
16:00 CEST (UTC+2)		Report		Stadium: Stadion Gersag; Attendance: 8,700; Referee: (Switzerland) Cyril Zimmermann

12 September 2010 Round 8	Luzern	6–2	Bellinzona	Lucerne
16:00 CEST (UTC+2)				Stadium: Stadion Gersag

25 September 2010 Round 10	St. Gallen	1–2	Luzern	St. Gallen
17:45 CEST (UTC+2)				Stadium: Kybunpark

3 October 2010 Round 11	Luzern	2–0	Young Boys	Lucerne
16:00 CEST (UTC+2)				Stadium: Stadion Gersag

23 October 2010 Round 12	Neuchâtel Xamax	2–1	Luzern	Neuchâtel
17:45 CEST (UTC+2)				Stadium: Stade de la Maladière

27 October 2010 Round 9	Zürich	2–2	Luzern	Zürich
19:45 CEST (UTC+2)				Stadium: Letzigrund

30 October 2010 Round 13	Sion	4–1	Luzern	Sion
17:45 CEST (UTC+2)				Stadium: Stade Tourbillon

7 November 2010 Round 14	Luzern	1–1	Basel	Stadion Allmend, Luzern
12:45	Veskovac (yellow card) 25'; Kibebe (yellow card) 45'; Pulji (yellow card) 53'; Ferreira 64' (1:0); Luqmon (yellow card) 92'	Summary	(yellow card) 25' Stocker; (yellow card) 54' Tembo; (yellow card) 90+2' Abraham; 90+4' (1:1) Almerares; (yellow card) 90+4' Almerares	Attendance: 8,700; Referee: (Switzerland) Stephan Studer
Note: Game interrupted for almost 6 minutes after 8 minutes play, because hundreds of tennis balls from the FCB fan sector flew onto the terrain (protest against the early play-off time, due to a tennis match).

14 November 2010 Round 15	Luzern	3–2	Grasshopper	Lucerne
16:00 CET (UTC+1)				Stadium: Stadion Gersag

27 November 2010 Round 16	Thun	1–1	Luzern	Thun
17:45 CET (UTC+1)				Stadium: Stadion Lachen

5 December 2010 Round 17	Bellinzona	0–2	Luzern	Bellinzona
16:00 CET (UTC+1)				Stadium: Stadio Comunale Bellinzona

11 December 2010 Round 18	Luzern	1–1	Zürich	Lucerne
17:45 CET (UTC+1)				Stadium: Stadion Gersag

5 February 2011 Round 19	Zürich	2–0	Luzern	Zürich
17:45 CET (UTC+1)				Stadium: Letzigrund

13 February 2011 Round 20	Luzern	3–1	Neuchâtel Xamax	Lucerne
17:45 CET (UTC+1)				Stadium: Stadion Gersag

20 February 2011 Round 21	Bellinzona	2–0	Luzern	Bellinzona
16:00 CET (UTC+1)				Stadium: Stadio Comunale Bellinzona

27 February 2011 Round 22	Luzern	0–1	Basel	Stadion Gersag, Lucerne
16:00	Zverotić (yellow card) 56'; H. Yakin (yellow card) 70'; Puljić (yellow card) 90+4'; Zibung (yellow card) 90+6'	Summary	14' (0:1) A. Frei; (yellow card) 80' A. Frei; (yellow card) 90+1' Steinhöfer; (yellow card) 90+3' Yapi; (yellow card) 90+3' Chipperfield; (yellow card) 90+4' Dragović	Attendance: 8,700; Referee: (Switzerland) Alain Bieri

6 March 2011 Round 23	Thun	3–3	Luzern	Thun
16:00 CET (UTC+1)				Stadium: Stadion Lachen

12 March 2011 Round 24	Luzern	1–0	Grasshopper	Lucerne
17:45 CET (UTC+1)				Stadium: Stadion Gersag

20 March 2011 Round 25	Young Boys	3–1	Luzern	Bern
16:00 CET (UTC+1)				Stadium: Stade de Suisse

3 April 2011 Round 26	Luzern	1–1	St. Gallen	Lucerne
16:00 CEST (UTC+2)				Stadium: Stadion Gersag

9 April 2011 Round 27	Luzern	0–1	Sion	Lucerne
17:45 CEST (UTC+2)				Stadium: Stadion Gersag

17 April 2011 Round 28	Neuchâtel Xamax	2–1	Luzern	Neuchâtel
16:00 CEST (UTC+2)				Stadium: Stade de la Maladière

20 April 2011 Round 29	Luzern	0–1	Thun	Lucerne
19:45 CEST (UTC+2)				Stadium: Stadion Gersag

23 April 2011 Round 30	Luzern	3–2	Bellinzona	Lucerne
17:45 CEST (UTC+2)				Stadium: Stadion Gersag

30 April 2011 Round 31	Grasshopper	2–1	Luzern	Zürich
17:45 CEST (UTC+2)				Stadium: Letzigrund

7 May 2011 Round 32	Luzern	1–1	Young Boys	Lucerne
17:45 CEST (UTC+2)				Stadium: Stadion Gersag

10 May 2011 Round 33	Sion	3–2	Luzern	Sion
19:45 CEST (UTC+2)				Stadium: Stade Tourbillon

14 May 2011 Round 34	St. Gallen	0–4	Luzern	St. Gallen
17:45 CEST (UTC+2)				Stadium: Kybunpark

22 May 2011 Round 35	Luzern	0–5	Zürich	Lucerne
16:00 CEST (UTC+2)				Stadium: Stadion Gersag

25 May 2011 Round 36	Basel	3–0	Luzern	St. Jakob-Park, Basel
20:00	A. Frei 6' (1:0); Shaqiri 45' (2:0); Zoua 54' (3:0)	Summary	(yellow card) 41' Kukeli; (yellow card) 51' Puljić; (yellow card) 53' Urtić	Attendance: 37,500 (sold out); Referee: (Switzerland) Massimo Busacca

=== Swiss Cup ===
19 September 2010 Round 1	FC Entfelden	0–3	Luzern	Oberentfelden
21:00 CEST (UTC+2)				Stadium: Schützenrain; Attendance: 3,700; Referee: Daniel Wermelinger

17 October 2010 Round 2	Stade Nyonnais	0–3	Luzern	Nyon
15:00 CEST (UTC+2)				Stadium: Colovray Sports Centre; Attendance: 1,230; Referee: Nikolaj Hänni

21 November 2010 Round 3	FC Biel-Bienne	2–2 (a.e.t.) (5–3 p)	Luzern	Biel/Bienne
15:00 CET (UTC+1)				Stadium: Tissot Arena; Attendance: 3,794; Referee: Bruno Grossen

=== UEFA Europa League ===
==== Third qualifying round ====
29 July 2010 First leg	Utrecht (Netherlands)	1–0	(Switzerland) Luzern	Utrecht, Netherlands
18:45 CEST (UTC+2)	Mertens 35'	Report		Stadium: Stadion Galgenwaard; Attendance: 12,100; Referee: Peter Rasmussen (Denmark)

5 August 2010 Second leg	Luzern (Switzerland)	1–3 (1–4 agg.)	(Netherlands) Utrecht	Zürich, Switzerland
19:45 CEST (UTC+2)	Pacar 53'	Report	Asare 13'; Van Wolfswinkel 22'; Silberbauer 28'	Stadium: Letzigrund (Note: Played in Zürich at Letzigrund as Luzern's Stadion Allmend did not meet UEFA criteria.); Attendance: 7,100; Referee: Aleksei Kulbakov (Belarus)
