= Boris Smiljanić =

Swiss footballer (born 1976)

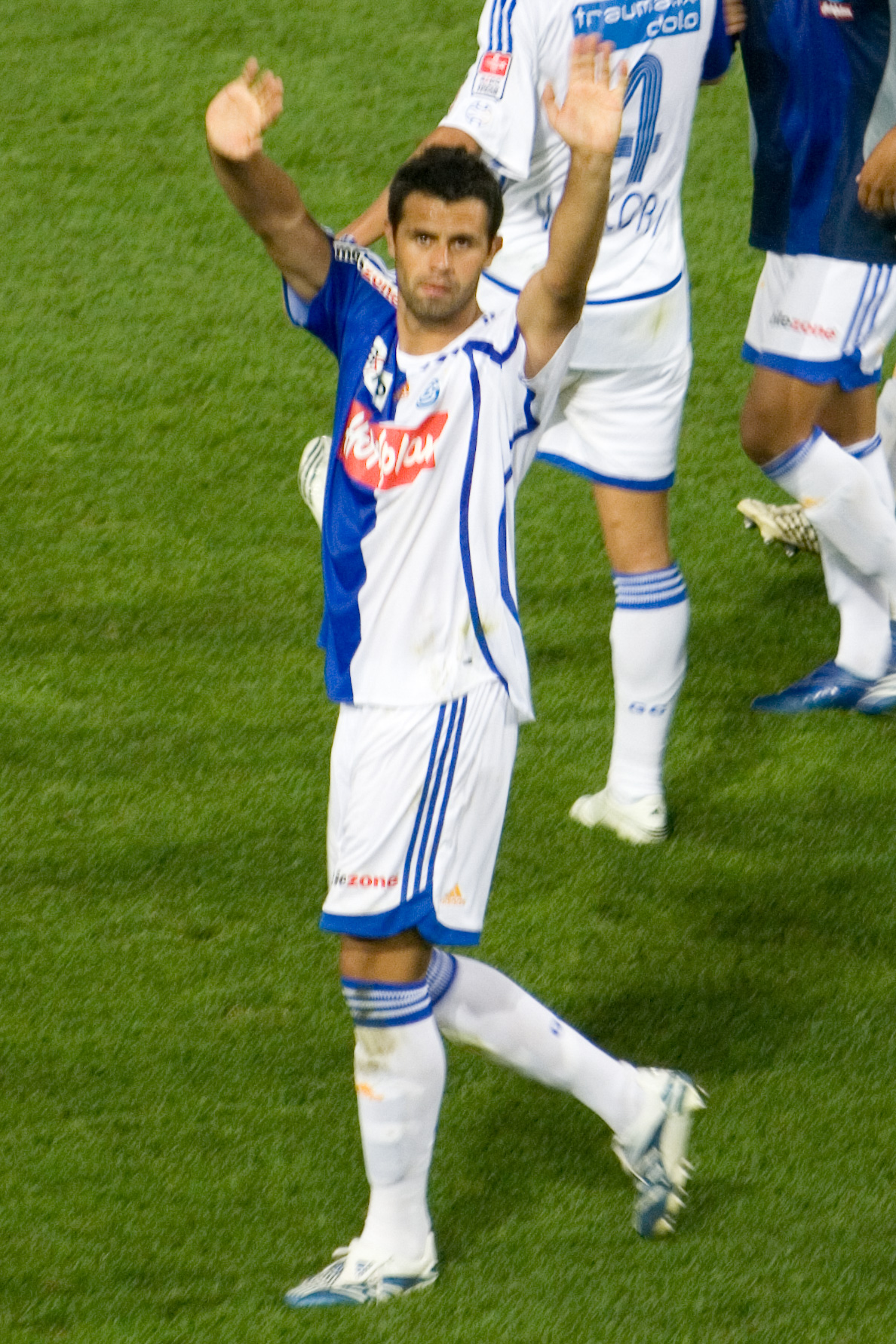
- Smiljanić in 2007

Personal information
- Date of birth: 28 September 1976 (age 50)
- Place of birth: Baden, Switzerland
- Height: 1.90 m (6 ft 3 in)
- Positions: Centre-back; left back

Youth career
- 1984–1990: FC Neuenhof
- 1990–1993: FC Wettingen

Senior career*
| Years | Team | Apps | (Gls) |
| 1993–1995 | Grasshopper Club U-21 | | |
| 1994–2002 | Grasshopper Club | 200 | (11) |
| 2003–2007 | FC Basel | 106 | (11) |
| 2007–2012 | Grasshopper Club | 120 | (13) |
| Total | | 426 | (35) |

International career
| 1999–2006 | Switzerland | 3 | (0) |

Managerial career
- 2013–2014: Grasshopper Club U-21 (assistant)
- 2014–2017: Grasshopper Club U-21
- 2017–2019: Schaffhausen
- 2022: Basel (assistant)
- 2022–2023: Aarau
- * Club domestic league appearances and goals

Boris Smiljanić (born 28 September 1976) is a Swiss football coach and a former player of Croatian descent who played in defence. He last coached Swiss Challenge League side FC Aarau.

== Club career ==
=== Grasshoppers ===
Smiljanić played his children's football with local club FC Neuenhof. During the summer of 1990 he moved to the youth department of FC Wettingen and in summer 1993 to the youth department of Grasshopper Club Zürich playing for their U-21 team. Towards the end of the 1994–95 league season he was called up into their first team for trials. He played in friendly games and had two appearances in the domestic league, as the team won the championship. Head coach Christian Gross then added Smiljanić permanently into the first team squad and used him as a substitute after a number of injuries in the squad and the team won the championship for the second time in succession. From the 1996–97 Nationalliga A season Smiljanić played as regular starter. He was eventually made captain of the GC team and he made over 200 appearances for the club winning five championships.

During his time by GC, Smiljanić could not win the Swiss Cup. In 1995 they reached the final, but lost 4–2 against Sion. In 1999 they reached the final again, but this time lost 2–0 against Lausanne-Sport. In the 2001–02 season, GC had advanced to the final again. Here they played FC Basel. It came to extra time because the game had ended one goal a piece. In the 113th minute Basel's Scott Chipperfield played a high ball from the left, over goalie Fabrice Borer, which GC captain Smiljanic punched over the cross bar with his last effort, this because he assumed that Hervé Tum, who was positioned behind him, would nod the ball effortlessly into the goal. This opened the stage for the Basel captain, Murat Yakin ran-up and safely converted the penalty kick to win the final 2–1 and thus the Trophy.

=== Basel ===
In January 2003 Smiljanić signed for FC Basel. He joined Basel's first team during their 2002–03 season under head coach Christian Gross. His former manager by GC, Gross had remembered his no-nonsense defending techniques and bought him strengthen his Basel defence. After playing in seven test games. Smiljanić played his debut for his new team in the Swiss Cup away game as Basel won 3–0 against lower tier Yverdon-Sport on 22 February 2003. He played his domestic league debut for the club one week later in the away game in the Stade de la Maladière as Basel were defeated 3–1 by Xamax coming on as substitute. Basel advanced to the cup final and here they were matched against Xamax. Smiljanić scored his first goal for the team in the final, played in the St. Jakob-Park, as Basel won 6–0. Basel ended the league season as runners-up.

In their league season the team started well, winning their first 13 matches straight out. The first defeat came on matchday 24. Basel won the championship with 26 victories and seven draws, the team had suffered just three away defeats, and obtained 85 points. Smiljanić had 23 league appearances, scoring twice. However, in the cup they were eliminated in round three and in the 2003–04 UEFA Cup they reached only the second round.

As reigning Swiss champions, Basel entered 2004–05 UEFA Champions League in the third qualifying round, however, drawn against Internazionale, who won the qualifier 5–2 on aggregate. Basel subsequently dropped into the 2004–05 UEFA Cup. Beating Terek Grozny in the first round, Basel qualified for the group stage. A 1–1 draw away against Schalke 04 was followed by a home defeat against Hearts. But with two victories, 2–1 away against Ferencvárosi TC and 1–0 at home against Feyenoord, saw Basel rise to third place in the group table and advance to the knock-out stage. In the round of 32 in the 2004–05 UEFA Cup, a home game in the St. Jakob-Park on 17 February 2005, Basel played a goalless draw against Lille OSC, but the return leg were defeated 2–0 and were eliminated. Smiljanić played eight of ten European matches He had 24 league appearances and won the championship for the second season running.

Basel started into the 2005–06 Super League season well and led the championship right until the last day of the league campaign. On the final day of the league season Basel played at home against Zürich. Mladen Petrić had scored an equaliser after FCZ had taken an early lead. But then a last-minute goal from Zürich's Iulian Filipescu meant the final score was 1-2 in favour of the away team and it gave FCZ their first national championship since 1980–81. The title for Basel was lost on goal difference. The last minute loss of the Championship and the subsequent riots, the so-called Basel Hooligan Incident, meant that the club would suffer the consequences.

Smiljanić injured himself to the beginning of their 2006–07 season and he missed the entire first half. His recovery allowed him to play the second half of the season. Basel ended the league as runners-up, one point behind championship winners Zürich. In the Swiss Cup Basel advanced to the final, beating Aarau in the quarter-final and Wil in the semi-final. In the final they played Luzern and won this 1–0 thanks to a penalty goal in the third minute of added time.

At the end of the season Smiljanić left the club. During his four and a half years with the club, he played a total of 203 games for Basel scoring a total of 16 goals. 106 of these games were in the Swiss Super League, 17 in the Swiss Cup, 22 in the UEFA competitions (Champions League and UEFA Cup) and 58 were friendly games. He scored 11 goals in the domestic league, one in the cup and the other four were scored during the test games.

=== Grasshoppers ===
Smiljanić returned to the Grasshoppers at the beginning of the 2007–08 season. Back with GC, he inherited his old number 6 and became team captain again. He had a further 120 league appearances, scoring 13 times in his second period with them. He retired from his active career at the end of the 2011–12 Super League season.

== International career ==
Although he was eligible to play for Croatia or Serbia, the countries of his parents, he chose to play for Switzerland, the country of his birth. He made his international debut in a 3–0 friendly defeat against the Czech Republic on 18 August 1999. He played two more games for Switzerland under Gilbert Gress, but when Enzo Trossero took over he was forced out of the squad. He made a shock return to the Switzerland squad in 2006.

== Coaching career ==
After retiring in July 2012, Smiljanić began working as a youth coach for Grasshopper. He was promoted to manager for the reserve team (U-21 squad) for the 2014/15 season. He worked for the club until 24 August 2017, where he was appointed as the manager of FC Schaffhausen. Smiljanić was fired on 27 February 2019.

On 31 December 2021, he was hired by then FC Basel head coach Patrick Rahmen as assistant coach. Following Rahmen's dismissal shortly after, on 21 February 2021, he asked for his contract with Basel to be cancelled for personal reasons.

On 3 November 2022, he was announced as the new head coach of Swiss Challenge League side FC Aarau. At the time of his appointment, Aarau sat in sixth place with eight points deficit to a promotion spot. Despite winning eleven out of the 22 matches at the Aarau sideline (six draws, five losses) and managing to shrink the gap to the second place and promotion to four points, Aarau still ended in fourth place, narrowly missing a place in the promotion playoff. As a result, Smiljanić and FC Aarau agreed to end their collaboration at the end of the season.

== Honours ==
Grasshopper

- Swiss Championship: 1994–95, 1995–96, 1997–98, 2000–01

Basel

- Swiss Super League: 2003–04, 2004–05
- Swiss Cup: 2002-03, 2006-07

== Coaching record ==
As of 27 May 2023

| Team | From | To | Record | | | | | | | |
| Team | From | To | G | W | D | L | GF | GA | GD | Win % |
|---|---|---|---|---|---|---|---|---|---|---|
| Grasshopper U21 | 1 July 2014 | 24 August 2017 | 83 | 41 | 23 | 19 | 177 | 111 | +66 | 49.40 |
| Schaffhausen | 25 August 2017 | 27 February 2019 | 55 | 23 | 7 | 25 | 86 | 87 | −1 | 41.82 |
| Aarau | 3 November 2022 | 28 May 2023 | 22 | 11 | 6 | 5 | 38 | 33 | +5 | 50.00 |
| Total | | | 158 | 75 | 36 | 47 | 299 | 230 | +69 | 47.47 |

== Sources ==
- Die ersten 125 Jahre. Publisher: Josef Zindel im Friedrich Reinhardt Verlag, Basel. ISBN 978-3-7245-2305-5
- Verein "Basler Fussballarchiv" Homepage
