= 2008–09 Swiss Cup =

Tournament details
- Country: Switzerland

Final positions
- Champions: FC Sion
- Runners-up: BSC Young Boys

The 2008–09 Swiss Cup was the 84th season of Switzerland's annual cup competition. It began on 20 September with the first games of Round 1 and ended on 20 May 2009 with the Final held at Stade de Suisse, Bern. The winners earned a place in the play-off round of the UEFA Europa League. FC Basel were the defending champions.

== Participating clubs ==
Nine Super League teams (FC Vaduz are from Liechtenstein and thus play in the 2008–09 Liechtenstein Cup) and all sixteen Challenge League clubs entered this year's competition, as well as thirteen teams from 1. Liga and 26 teams from lower leagues (their level within the Swiss league pyramid is given in parentheses below). Teams from 1. Liga and below had to qualify through separate qualifying rounds within their leagues.

2008–09 Super League; 9 teams	2008–09 Challenge League; 16 teams	2008–09 1. Liga; 13 teams	Amateur teams 26 teams
FC Aarau; FC Basel; AC Bellinzona; Grasshoppers Zürich; FC Luzern; Neuchâtel Xamax; FC Sion; BSC Young Boys; FC Zürich	FC Biel-Bienne; FC Concordia Basel; FC Gossau; FC La Chaux-de-Fonds; FC Lausanne-Sport; FC Locarno; AC Lugano; FC St. Gallen; FC Schaffhausen; Servette FC Genève; Stade Nyonnais; FC Thun; FC Wil; FC Winterthur; FC Wohlen; Yverdon-Sport FC	FC Baulmes; GC Biaschesi; FC Bulle; CS Chênois; FC Echallens; Etoile-Carouge FC; FC Grenchen; SV Höngg; FC Le Mont, Lausanne; ES FC Malley, Lausanne; FC Kreuzlingen; FC Schötz; SC Zofingen	Fourth level: FC Alle; FC Bavois; FC Bazenheid; SC Binningen; SC Brühl, St. Gallen; FC Grand-Lancy; FC Ibach; FC Liestal; FC Plan-les-Ouates; Racing Club, Geneva; FC Seefeld, Zürich; FC Sursee; FC Thalwil; Fifth level: FC Allmendingen; FC Amriswil; FC Bassersdorf; FC La Sarraz-Eclépens; Le Locle Sports; FC Oerlikon/Polizei, Zürich; FC Plaffeien; FC Saxon Sports; FC Tavannes/Tramelan; FC Wacker Grenchen; FC Widnau; FC Windisch; Sixth level: AC Vallemaggia

== Round 1 ==
Teams from Super League and Challenge League were seeded in this round. In a match, the home advantage was granted to the team from the lower league, if applicable.

Team 1	Score	Team 2
19 September 2008
FC Grand-Lancy	0–3	FC Lausanne-Sport
FC Sursee	0–2	FC Wohlen
Racing Club Genève	1–2	FC Echallens
FC Windisch	1–5	FC Thun
20 September 2008
Le Locle Sports	0–7	Yverdon-Sport FC
SC Binningen	2–6	FC Aarau
FC Oerlikon/Polizei	1–5	AC Bellinzona
FC Allmendingen	0–2	SC Zofingen
FC Wacker Grenchen	1–3 (a.e.t.)	FC Alle
FC Amriswil	0–0 (a.e.t.) (p. 2–4)	FC Schaffhausen
FC Seefeld	0–0 (a.e.t.) (p. 3–2)	FC Winterthur
FC Thalwil	1–3	FC Gossau
FC Bavois	3–1	FC Baulmes
CS Chênois	1–3	ES FC Malley
FC Bazenheid	0–2 (a.e.t.)	FC St. Gallen
FC Kreuzlingen	1–3	FC Locarno
SC Brühl	0–5	Grasshopper Club Zürich
FC Le Mont	2–0	Stade Nyonnais
FC Liestal	0–3	FC Concordia Basel
FC Schötz	0–1	FC Basel
FC Bassersdorf	0–2	SV Höngg
FC Tavannes/Tramelan	0–2	FC Bulle
FC Saxon-Sports	0–2	Neuchâtel Xamax
Etoile-Carouge FC	0–5	FC Sion
FC Grenchen	3–2 (a.e.t.)	FC Biel-Bienne
21 September 2008
FC Widnau	0–6	FC Zürich
FC Ibach	0–6	BSC Young Boys Bern
FC La Sarraz-Ecléplens	1–6	Servette FC Genève
FC Plaffeien	0–3	FC Luzern
GC Biaschesi	0–1	FC Wil 1900
FC Plan-les-Ouates	0–3	FC La Chaux-de-Fonds
AC Vallemaggia	0–5	AC Lugano

- ^1The match between Wacker Grenchen and FC Alle was abandoned after 119 minutes because of violent altercations among players, coaches and spectators. Both teams had originally been expelled from the competition. However, upon a successful appeal, FC Alle were awarded the victory and gained permission to compete in the second round.

== Round 2 ==
The winners of Round 1 played in this round. Teams from Super League were seeded. In a match, the home advantage was granted to the team from the lower league, if applicable.

Team 1	Score	Team 2
17 October 2008
FC Bulle	1–4	FC Basel
18 October 2008
SV Höngg	0–3	FC Wil
FC Seefeld	1–3	FC Gossau
FC Zofingen	2–3	AC Bellinzona
FC Wohlen	2–3	Grasshoppers Zürich
FC Concordia Basel	3–1	Servette FC Genève
FC Lausanne-Sport	1–2	Neuchâtel Xamax
Yverdon Sports	1–2	FC La Chaux-de-Fonds
FC St. Gallen	2–0	FC Aarau
ES FC Malley	3–2	FC Echallens
19 October 2008
FC Grenchen	0–3	FC Luzern
FC Schaffhausen	0–1 (a.e.t.)	FC Zürich
FC Bavois	0–1	FC Thun
FC Le Mont	2–5	FC Sion
FC Locarno	3–1	AC Lugano
29 October 2008
FC Alle	0–5	BSC Young Boys

== Round 3 ==
The winners of Round 2 played in this round. In a match, the home advantage was granted to the team from the lower league, if applicable. Some games were postponed due to snow, and subsequently played elsewhere.

Team 1	Score	Team 2
22 November 2008
FC Concordia Basel	4–0	Neuchâtel Xamax
FC Thun	0–4	FC Basel
FC St. Gallen	2–0	FC Locarno
23 November 2008
Grasshoppers Zürich	2–1	AC Bellinzona
ES FC Malley	0–1	FC Sion
FC Wil	0–1	FC Zürich
10 December 2008
FC La Chaux-de-Fonds	0–4	FC Luzern
FC Gossau	0–1	BSC Young Boys

- ^1The match was played at Stade de la Maladière, Neuchâtel.
- ^2The match was played at Stade de Suisse, Bern.

== Quarter-finals ==
The winners of Round 3 played in this round.

4 March 2009
20:15 CET

BSC Young Boys	3 – 0	Grasshoppers Zürich
Ghezal 56'; Hochstrasser 67'; Seydou 70'

Stade de Suisse, Bern
Attendance: 10758

17 March 2009
20:15 CET

FC St. Gallen	1 – 2	FC Sion
Sarni 12' (o.g.)		Monterrubio 53'; Dominguez 66'

AFG Arena, St. Gallen

18 March 2009
19:30 CET

FC Concordia Basel	0 – 2	FC Luzern
		Schwegler 65'; João Paiva 88'

Rankhof, Basel
Attendance: 950

18 March 2009
20:15 CET

FC Zürich	0 – 1	FC Basel
		Huggel 67' (pen.)

Letzigrund, Zürich
Attendance: 16200

== Semi-finals ==
The winners of the quarter-finals played in this round. As in the previous round, matches were openly drawn, meaning that the team drawn first in a match earned the home game.

13 April 2009
20:15 CEST

FC Luzern	1 – 1 (a.e.t.)	FC Sion
Lustenberger 90+5'		Monterrubio 85'
Penalties
Gajić (penalty scored); Paiva (penalty missed); Pacar (penalty missed); Renggli (penalty scored)	2 – 4	(penalty scored) Obradović; (penalty scored) Fermino; (penalty scored) Afonso; (penalty scored) Paíto

Stadion Allmend, Lucerne
Attendance: 12,500

16 April 2009
20:15 CEST

BSC Young Boys	0 – 0 (a.e.t.)	FC Basel
Penalties
Yapi Yapo (penalty scored); Hochstrasser (penalty missed); Bastians (penalty scored); Schneuwly (penalty scored)	3 – 2	(penalty missed) Huggel; (penalty scored) Ergić; (penalty missed) Abraham; (penalty scored) Chipperfield; (penalty missed) Gjasula

Stade de Suisse, Bern
Attendance: 31,120

== Final ==
20 May 2009
20:30 CEST

BSC Young Boys	2 – 3	FC Sion
Yapi Yapo 22' (pen.); Alioui 36' (o.g.)		Obradović 41'; Sarni 53'; Afonso 88'

Stade de Suisse, Bern
Attendance: 31,789
Referee: Claudio Circhetta
