= Enes Fermino =

Swiss–Congolese footballer (born 1987)

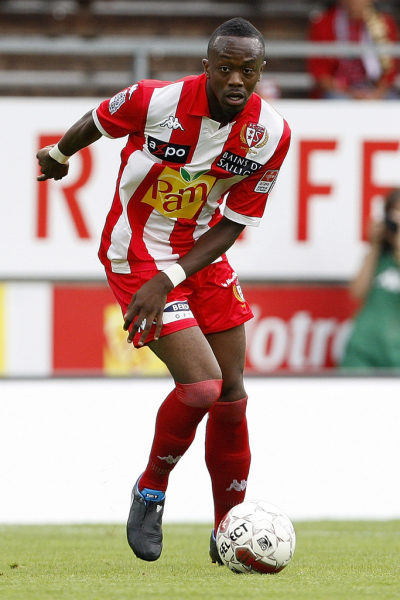
- Fermino in 2009

Personal information
- Date of birth: 29 May 1987 (age 39)
- Place of birth: Lausanne, Switzerland
- Height: 1.85 m (6 ft 1 in)
- Position: Defensive midfielder

Youth career
- 2000–2003: Lausanne-Sport

Senior career*
Years	Team	Apps	(Gls)
2003–2004	Lausanne-Sport	21	(1)
2004–2006	Malley	24	(0)
2006–2008	La Chaux-de-Fonds	77	(4)
2009–2011	Sion	38	(1)
2010–2012	Sion II	22	(0)
2010–2011	→ FC Locarno (loan)	14	(0)
2013	Macclesfield Town	4	(0)
2013–2014	Droylsden		
2014–2015	FC Köniz	15	(0)
2015	FC Le Mont	2	(0)
2015–2016	FC Azzurri 90		
2016	Fribourg		
2017–2018	FC La Sarraz-Eclépens		

International career
2005–2007	Switzerland U19	2	(0)
2006–2007	Switzerland U20	4	(0)
2007–2008	DR Congo U21	4	(1)
- * Club domestic league appearances and goals

Enes Fermino (born 29 May 1987) is a Congolese and Swiss former professional footballer who played as a defensive midfielder.

== Club career ==
Fermino began his career in the youth at FC Lausanne-Sport and was promoted to the first team in 2004. In 2005 he joined ES FC Malley, also in Lausanne.

He was scouted by FC La Chaux-de-Fonds, where he signed his first professional contract. On 6 January 2009, He left the club after 49 games and four goals and signed a contract by FC Sion between 30 June 2013.

== International career ==
Fermino represented Switzerland at U-19 and U-20 level, before switching nationality to DR Congo, who he represented at U-21 level. He never played senior international football.

== Honours ==
Sion

- Swiss Cup: 2008–09
