= Dollhouse Museum =

Coordinates: 47°33′14″N 7°35′20″E

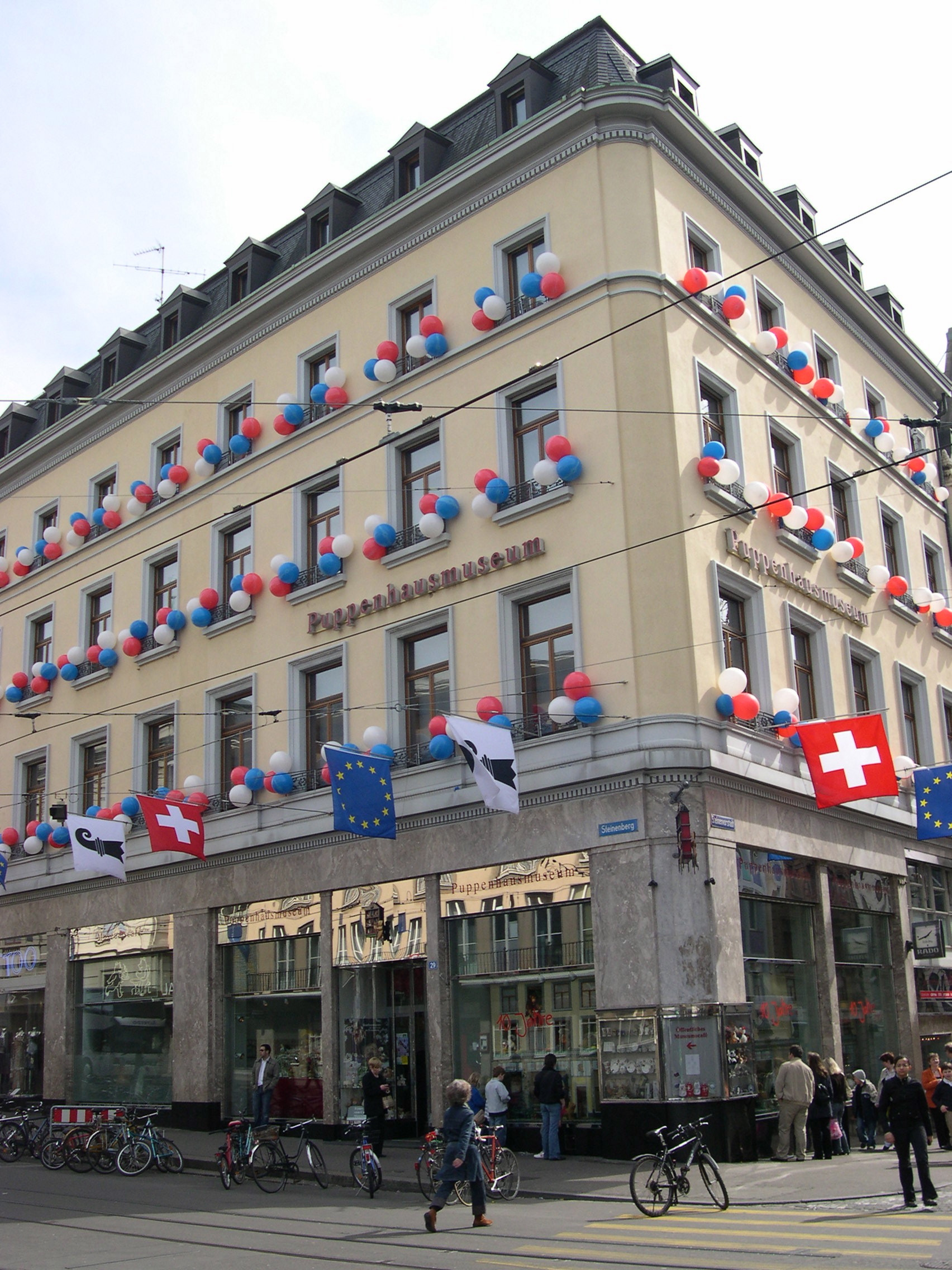
- Location: Basel, Switzerland
- Type: Toy museum
- Website: https://www.toy-worlds-museum-basle.ch/

The Dollhouse Museum (German: Puppenhausmuseum) in Basel is the largest museum of its kind in Europe. Now known as the Spielzeug Welten Museum Basel (Toy Worlds Museum Basle). The museum is located at Barfüsserplatz in the city center.

== Collection ==
The museum displays over 6,000 exhibits (teddy bears, dolls, play shops, dollhouses and miniatures) in arranged vignettes. It also regularly organizes special exhibitions on individual themes. In particular, the teddy bear collection is unique the world over in terms of variety and quality.

Gisela Oeri, honorary president of local football club FC Basel, is heavily involved in the museum on a financial level.

== See also ==
- Museums in Basel
- List of museums in Switzerland
