= Gisela Oeri =

Swiss-German football chairwoman and philanthropist

- Born: November 8, 1955 (age 70); Germany Schopfheim
- Spouse: Andreas Oeri

Gisela "Gigi" Oeri (born 1955) is a Swiss-German football chairwoman and philanthropist born 8 November 1955 in Schopfheim, Baden-Württemberg, Germany. She was the chairwoman of FC Basel from 2006 until 2012. At the club's Extraordinary General Assembly on 16 January 2012 the 601 attending members appointed Oeri as honorary president.

Oeri is a trained physiotherapist although she no longer practices. She is married to Andreas Oeri, one of the heirs of the Basel pharmaceutical company F. Hoffmann-La Roche AG. According to the business magazine Bilanz the couple are the richest Swiss people.

Oeri is heavily involved financially with the Puppenhausmuseum, the largest collection of teddy bears in Europe.

The foundation Youth Campus Basel was brought to life by Ms Gigi Oeri in 2010, with the aim to continuously develop FC Basel’s youth division on a long-term basis. The foundation runs the campus grounds in Münchenstein and the Wohnhuus in Basel and aids in the administration of the youth department. The foundation aids in the integral training and promotion of young football talents.
