= Sebastian Kollar =

Swiss footballer (born 1987)

Personal information
- Full name: Sebastian Kollar
- Date of birth: 23 February 1987 (age 39)
- Place of birth: Switzerland
- Height: 1.83 m (6 ft 0 in)
- Position: Defensive midfielder

Youth career
- 1993–1998: SC Binningen
- 1998–2003: FC Basel
- 2003–2004: FC Concordia Basel

Senior career*
Years	Team	Apps	(Gls)
2004–2006	FC Concordia Basel	19	(0)
2006–2007	FC Zürich	21	(1)
2008	FC Wil	6	(2)
2008–2009	FC St. Gallen	25	(1)
2010	FC Zürich	0	(0)
Total		71	(4)

International career
2006–2008	Switzerland U-21	9	(0)
- * Club domestic league appearances and goals

Sebastian Kollar (born 23 February 1987) is a Swiss former professional footballer who played as defensive midfielder. He was part of the 2006–07 Swiss Championship winning team. He moved to FC Wil on 4 April 2008.
