= Armand Deumi =

Cameroonian footballer

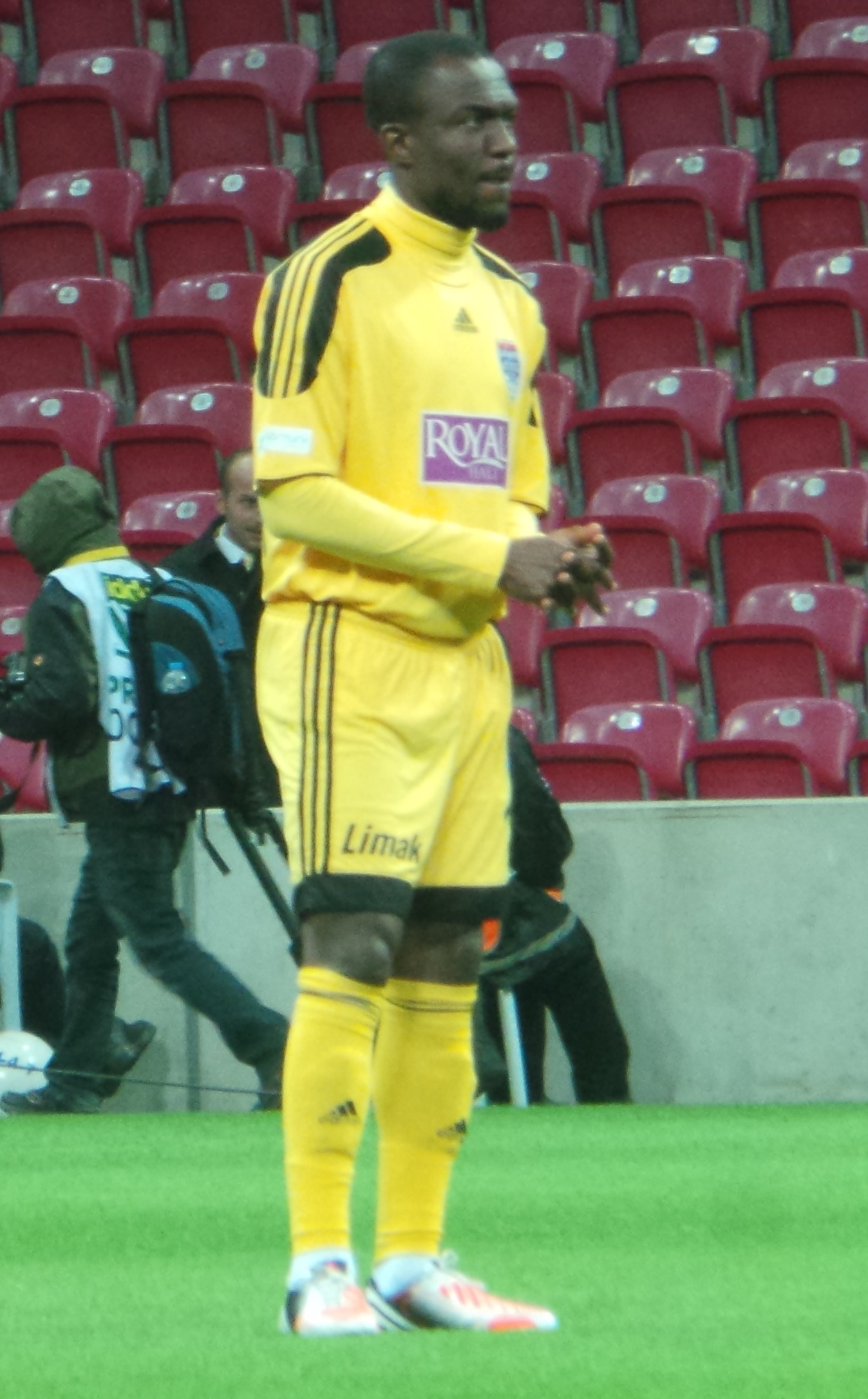
- Deumi December 2013

Personal information
- Full name: Armand Deumi Tchani
- Date of birth: 12 March 1979 (age 47)
- Place of birth: Douala, Cameroon
- Height: 1.80 m (5 ft 11 in)
- Position: Defender

Senior career*
Years	Team	Apps	(Gls)
- UCB Douala
1997–2000	Kadji Sports Academy		
2000–2002	FC Sion	56	(5)
2002–2007	FC Thun	140	(8)
2007–2010	Gaziantepspor	88	(2)
2010–2013	Karabükspor	64	(2)
2013–2015	Gaziantep BB	20	(0)

International career
2005–2009	Cameroon	3	(0)
- * Club domestic league appearances and goals

Armand Deumi Tchani (born 12 March 1979) is a Cameroonian former professional footballer who played as a defender. He made three FIFA-official appearances for the Cameroon national team.

== Club career ==
Deumi started his career in his native country of Cameroon playing for UCB Douala and Kadji Sport Academy de Douala. In 1999, he transferred to Switzerland to play for FC Sion. Deumi spent three years at FC Sion and was impressive enough to earn a move to Swiss league rivals FC Thun. He became a crucial part of the team but missed a large part of the 2003–04 season after suffering a ruptured knee ligament. After recovering from the injury, Deumi quickly reestablished himself in the FC Thun side and was considered by many to be the best defender playing in Switzerland as FC Thun achieved a second-place finish and a spot in next year's UEFA Champions League.

In June 2007, it was announced that Deumi had left FC Thun and signed a three-year deal with Gaziantepspor. In July 2010, he joined Karabükspor.

== International career ==
Deumi came into the Cameroon team for the 2006 FIFA World Cup qualifier against Sudan in March 2005, and made his first start in June in the victory against Benin.
