= Tim Grossklaus =

German footballer

Personal information
- Date of birth: 22 July 1987 (age 39)
- Place of birth: Freiburg, West Germany
- Height: 1.80 m (5 ft 11 in)
- Position: Forward

Senior career*
Years	Team	Apps	(Gls)
2005–2007	FC Basel U21	47	(25)
2007–2009	FC Vaduz	23	(3)
2009	→ FC Wil (loan)	11	(1)
2009–2011	FC Wil	32	(14)
2011–2012	BSC Old Boys	6	(2)
Total		119	(45)

Managerial career
- 2014–2015: SpVgg Untermünstertal (playing manager)
- * Club domestic league appearances and goals

Tim Grossklaus (born 22 July 1987) is a German former professional footballer who played as a forward.

== Career ==
Grossklaus was born in Freiburg, West Germany. He started his career at FC Basel's youth team in 2005 and had a successful second season there in which he scored 21 goals in 29 appearances for FC Basel Under-21s. His goal-scoring form caught the eye of many Austrian and Swiss clubs and he eventually joined Liechtenstein side FC Vaduz in summer 2007. He helped the club secure promotion to the Swiss Super League from the Swiss Challenge League in the 2007–08 season. On 15 January 2009, he moved to FC Wil on loan along with teammate Diren Akdemir.
