= Hervé Bochud =

Swiss footballer (born 1980)

Personal information
- Date of birth: 15 November 1980 (age 45)
- Place of birth: Chambéry, France
- Height: 1.82 m (6 ft 0 in)
- Position: Centre-back

Youth career
- 1991–1994: FC Nivolet Bassens
- 1994–1995: SO Chambéry Foot
- 1995–1999: Auxerrre

Senior career*
Years	Team	Apps	(Gls)
1999–2000	Neuchâtel Xamax	2	(0)
2001–2003	Young Boys II	9	(3)
2001–2003	Young Boys	0	(0)
2003–2004	Yverdon-Sport	9	(0)
2003–2004	FC Solothurn	18	(0)
2004–2005	SR Delémont	9	(0)
2005–2006	FC Baden	13	(2)
2005–2006	FC Wil	29	(4)
2006–2008	FC Schaffhausen	48	(2)
2008–2009	Carl Zeiss Jena	5	(0)
2008–2009	Carl Zeiss Jena II	4	(1)
2009–2010	FC Le Mont	11	(0)
2010	SC Kriens	6	(0)
2010–2011	FC La Tour/Le Pâquier		
- * Club domestic league appearances and goals

Hervé Bochud (born 15 November 1980) is a former professional footballer who played as a centre-back, who spent most of his career in Switzerland. He was also ambassador for the Swiss Association of Football Players (SAFP).
