= Kristian Nushi =

Kosovan footballer

Personal information
- Full name: Kristian Nushi
- Date of birth: 21 July 1982 (age 44)
- Place of birth: Gjakova, SFR Yugoslavia
- Height: 1.75 m (5 ft 9 in)
- Position: Midfielder

Youth career
- –1999: Prishtina
- 1999–2002: Spiez

Senior career*
Years	Team	Apps	(Gls)
2002–2007	Wil	89	(18)
2007–2009	Aarau	59	(4)
2009–2014	St. Gallen	143	(13)
2014–2015	Winterthur	15	(1)
2016	Tuggen	9	(0)
2016–2023	Uzwil	135	(36)
Total		460	(72)

International career^{‡}
2007–2014	Kosovo	5	(1)
- * Club domestic league appearances and goals as of 28 October 2017 ‡ National team caps and goals as of 7 September 2014

Kristian Nushi (born 21 July 1982) is a Kosovan former professional footballer who played as a midfielder.

== Club career ==
=== Early career ===
Nushi began his career at the Prishtina. In 1999, he moved to Switzerland and played for Spiez until 2002.

=== Wil ===
After playing well in Kosovo, Nushi was alerted to SWil in the Swiss Super League and was invited to take part in a week-long trial. On 1 July 2002. Nushi signed to for Wil and took part in the 2003 UEFA Intertoto Cup and became win the 2004 Swiss Cup.

=== Aarau ===
In summer 2007. Nushi signed to Swiss Super League side Aarau.

=== St. Gallen ===
On 30 May 2009. Nushi signed to Swiss Super League side St. Gallen.

=== Winterthur ===
In September 2014. Nushi signed to Swiss Challenge League side Winterthur.

=== Tuggen ===
On 15 February 2016. Nushi signed to Swiss Promotion League side Tuggen.

=== Uzwil ===
On 1 July 2016. Nushi signed to 2. Liga Interregional side Uzwil. He won the 2. Liga Interregional title in 2020–21.

== International career ==
On 15 June 2007, Nushi making his debut with Kosovo in a friendly match against Saudi Arabia and score his side's only goal during a 1–0 winning. He returned to the Kosovo national team after they were admitted into UEFA in 2014.

== Career statistics ==
=== International ===
Appearances and goals by national team and year
National team	Year	Apps	Goals
Kosovo	2007	1	1
Kosovo	2014	4	0
Total		5	1

Scores and results list Kosovo's goal tally first, score column indicates score after each Nushi goal.

List of international goals scored by Kristian Nushi
No.	Date	Venue	Cap	Opponent	Score	Result	Competition
1.	15 June 2007	Ankara, Turkey	1	Saudi Arabia	1–0	1–0	Friendly
