= Stéphane Sarni =

Swiss-Italian footballer

Personal information
- Date of birth: 31 August 1980 (age 46)
- Height: 1.80 m (5 ft 11 in)
- Positions: Centre-back; right-back

Senior career*
Years	Team	Apps	(Gls)
1997–2000	Sion	57	(5)
2001	Bellinzona	8	(0)
2001–2002	CD Onda	23	(0)
2002–2003	Sion	16	(0)
2003–2004	Servette	13	(0)
2004–2010	Sion	91	(1)
2011	Stade Nyonnais	11	(1)
2011–2012	Lugano	19	(1)
2013	FC Monthey		
2014–2015	Martigny Sports		
Total		238	(8)

Managerial career
- 2019–2020: Sion U16
- 2020–2021: Sion U19
- * Club domestic league appearances and goals

Stéphane Sarni (born 31 August 1980) is a Swiss-Italian former professional footballer who played as defender.

In 2009 he came on as a substitute and scored one of Sion's goals as they defeated BSC Young Boys 3-2 in the Swiss Cup Final.

== Honours ==
Sion

- Swiss Cup: 2005–06, 2008–09
