= Serdal Kül =

Turkish footballer (born 1987)

Personal information
- Date of birth: November 26, 1987 (age 38)
- Place of birth: Turkey
- Height: 1.81 m (5 ft 11 in)
- Position: Midfielder

Team information
- Current team: FC St. Gallen
- Number: 17

Senior career*
Years	Team	Apps	(Gls)
2007–	FC St. Gallen		
- * Club domestic league appearances and goals as of 5 January 2008

Serdal Kül (born 26 November 1987) is a Turkish football midfielder, who currently plays for FC St. Gallen in the Swiss Super League.
