= Janko Pacar =

Swiss football forward (born 1990)

Personal information
- Full name: Janko Pacar
- Date of birth: 18 August 1990 (age 36)
- Place of birth: Luzern, Switzerland
- Height: 1.81 m (5 ft 11 in)
- Position: Forward

Team information
- Current team: FC Emmenbrücke

Youth career
- 2005–2007: FC Luzern

Senior career*
Years	Team	Apps	(Gls)
2007–2014	FC Luzern	45	(3)
2009–2010	→ SC Kriens (loan)	19	(4)
2011–2012	→ SC Kriens (loan)	18	(5)
2012–2014	→ FC Winterthur (loan)	45	(4)
2014–2015	FC Chiasso	28	(4)
2015	Servette FC	12	(6)
2016	Petrolul Ploiești	14	(1)
2016–2018	FC Wohlen	39	(12)
2018–2019	Yverdon-Sport	28	(8)
2019–	FC Emmenbrücke	0	(0)
- * Club domestic league appearances and goals as of 15:29, 24 July 2019 (UTC)

Janko Pacar (born 18 August 1990) is a Swiss football forward who currently plays for FC Emmenbrücke.

== Career ==
In January 2016, he joined Petrolul Ploiești on an 18-month loan deal but the contract expired when the club relegated at the end of the 2015–16 season. In July 2016, he signed a three-year contract with FC Wohlen.

Ahead of the 2019/20 season, Pacar joined FC Emmenbrücke.
