= 2006–07 Swiss Super League =

110th season of top-tier Swiss football

Swiss Super League
- Season: 2006–07
- Dates: 19 July 2006 – 24 May 2007
- Champions: Zürich; 11th title
- Relegated: Schaffhausen
- Champions League: Zürich
- UEFA Cup: Basel; Sion; Young Boys
- Intertoto Cup: St. Gallen
- Matches: 180
- Goals: 470 (2.61 per match)
- Top goalscorer: Mladen Petrić (19 goals)

The 2006–07 Swiss Super League was the 110th season of top-tier football in Switzerland. The competition was officially named AXPO Super League due to sponsoring purposes. It began on 19 July 2006 and has ended on 24 May 2007.

== Teams ==
Location of teams in the 2006–07 Swiss Super League

== League table ==
Pos	Team	Pld	W	D	L	GF	GA	GD	Pts	Qualification or relegation
1	Zürich (C)	36	23	6	7	67	32	+35	75	Qualification to Champions League third qualifying round
2	Basel	36	22	8	6	77	40	+37	74	Qualification to UEFA Cup second qualifying round
3	Sion	36	17	9	10	57	42	+15	60	Qualification to UEFA Cup second qualifying round
4	Young Boys	36	17	8	11	52	42	+10	59	Qualification to UEFA Cup first qualifying round
5	St. Gallen	36	14	13	9	47	44	+3	55	Qualification to Intertoto Cup second round
6	Grasshopper	36	13	11	12	54	41	+13	50	
7	Thun	36	10	7	19	30	58	−28	37	
8	Luzern	36	8	9	19	31	58	−27	33	
9	Aarau	36	6	8	22	28	55	−27	26	Qualification to relegation play-off
10	Schaffhausen (R)	36	4	13	19	27	58	−31	25	Relegation to Swiss Challenge League

Source: RSSSF
Rules for classification: 1) points; 2) goal difference; 3) number of goals scored.
(C) Champions; (R) Relegated

== Results ==
Teams play each other four times in this league. In the first half of the season each team played every other team twice (home and away) and then do the same in the second half of the season.

=== First half of season ===
Home \ Away	AAR	BAS	GCZ	LUZ	SHA	SIO	STG	THU	YB	ZÜR
Aarau		2–3	1–0	0–1	1–0	1–3	0–3	1–1	0–1	0–4
Basel	3–1		2–3	3–0	3–0	3–1	2–1	4–1	2–2	2–1
Grasshopper	3–1	1–2		2–0	5–0	0–0	4–1	4–1	1–2	0–1
Luzern	2–1	2–0	0–1		1–1	1–1	0–1	2–1	3–1	0–3
Schaffhausen	0–1	4–2	3–3	1–1		1–3	1–1	0–0	1–0	0–2
Sion	2–1	4–2	2–2	3–2	2–2		4–0	3–0	1–0	2–2
St. Gallen	1–0	3–2	0–0	1–0	3–1	5–1		1–2	2–1	3–1
Thun	2–1	1–1	0–1	1–1	1–0	0–1	0–2		0–0	0–2
Young Boys	2–1	1–1	1–3	3–2	3–2	2–1	3–0	5–0		2–0
Zürich	3–0	3–2	2–1	2–1	0–1	2–1	2–1	5–0	3–1	

Legend: Blue = home team win; Yellow = draw; Red = away team win.

=== Second half of season ===
Home \ Away	AAR	BAS	GCZ	LUZ	SHA	SIO	STG	THU	YB	ZÜR
Aarau		0–1	0–0	4–1	3–2	0–2	1–1	0–0	1–1	0–3
Basel	2–0		3–0	1–0	0–0	2–0	3–3	4–1	2–0	4–2
Grasshopper	1–0	1–5		5–0	1–2	0–0	1–1	0–3	1–2	0–0
Luzern	1–0	0–3	1–6		0–0	2–0	1–1	1–2	1–1	2–0
Schaffhausen	0–2	2–2	1–1	0–0		0–1	0–1	1–2	0–1	0–4
Sion	1–1	0–0	1–1	2–0	3–0		0–2	2–1	2–0	1–2
St. Gallen	1–0	0–0	0–0	0–0	1–1	0–3		2–0	1–1	2–2
Thun	1–0	0–2	0–2	2–1	2–0	1–3	3–1		0–1	0–1
Young Boys	1–1	0–3	1–0	3–1	2–0	2–0	1–1	3–1		2–3
Zürich	2–2	0–1	2–0	2–0	0–0	2–1	3–0	0–0	1–0	

Legend: Blue = home team win; Yellow = draw; Red = away team win.

== Relegation play-offs ==
FC Aarau as 9th-placed team of the Super League were played a two-legged play-off against Challenge League runners-up AC Bellinzona.

30 May 2007
20:15 CEST

Bellinzona	1–2	Aarau
Gomes 47'		Rogério 21'; Mesbah 36'

Stadio Comunale, Bellinzona
Attendance: 7,537
Referee: Claudio Circhetta

3 June 2007
16:00 CEST

Aarau	3–1	Bellinzona
Mesbah 68', 89'; Sermeter 90+1'		Ianu 52'

Stadion Brügglifeld, Aarau
Attendance: 9,250
Referee: Guido Wildhaber

Aarau won 5–2 on aggregate and retain their place in the Swiss Super League.

== Top goal scorers ==
Last updated on May 20, 2007

Rank	Player	Club	Goals
1	(Croatia) Mladen Petrić	FC Basel	19
2	(Argentina) Francisco Aguirre	FC St. Gallen	16
3	(Brazil) Raffael	FC Zürich	14
4	(Costa Rica) Álvaro Saborío	FC Sion	13
4	(Ghana) Alex Tachie-Mensah	FC St. Gallen	13
6	(Austria) Sanel Kuljić	FC Sion	12
7	(Croatia) Ivan Rakitić	FC Basel	11
7	(Cameroon) Jean-Michel Tchouga	FC Luzern	11
9	(Switzerland) Thomas Häberli	BSC Young Boys	10
9	(Switzerland) Hakan Yakin	BSC Young Boys	10

== Attendances ==
#	Club	Average	Highest
1	Basel	20,144	34,070
2	Young Boys	15,517	26,157
3	Sion	12,304	15,200
4	Zürich	10,871	18,137
5	St. Gallen	9,454	11,300
6	Luzern	7,733	10,617
7	GCZ	6,920	17,666
8	Aarau	5,478	8,600
9	Thun	5,159	7,500
10	Schaffhausen	3,146	5,050
