= 2005–06 FC Basel season =

FC Basel
2005–06 season
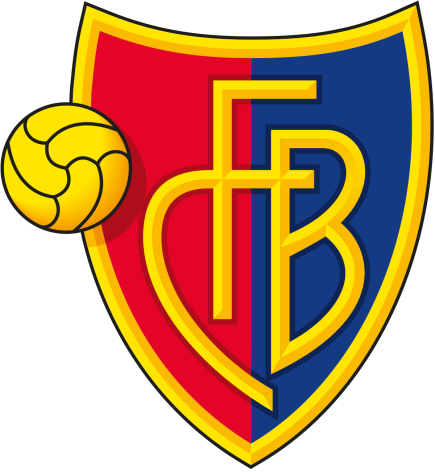
- Chairman: Werner Edelmann
- Manager: Christian Gross
- Stadium: St. Jakob-Park
- Swiss Super League: 2nd
- Swiss Cup: Round of 16
- Champions League: Third qualifying round
- UEFA Cup: Quarter-finals
- Top goalscorer: League: Matías Emilio Delgado (18); All: Matías Emilio Delgado (27)
- Highest home attendance: 32,712 (vs. Zürich, 13 May 2006)
- Lowest home attendance: 12,947 (vs. Yverdon-Sport, 26 February 2006)
- Average home league attendance: 21,807

The 2005–06 season was Fussball Club Basel 1893's 113th in existence and the club's 12th consecutive season in the top flight of Swiss football. Werner Edelmann was confirmed as the club's chairman for the fourth successive season at the AGM. FCB played their home matches in the St. Jakob-Park, in the Basel quarter St. Alban in the south-east of the city.

== Overview ==
Christian Gross was head coach for the seventh successive season. A number of players left the squad. Marco Zwyssig retired from active football. Sébastien Barberis was released on a free transfer, after eight years with the club and he moved on to FC Bulle. Philipp Degen transferred to Borussia Dortmund and Benjamin Huggel transferred to Eintracht Frankfurt. Goalkeeper Thomas Mandl returned to Austria and signed for Admira Wacker Mödling and defender Kléber returned to Brazil, signing for Santos. The two Argentinian strikers Christian Giménez and Julio Hernán Rossi also left the club, Giménez in August and Rossi during the winter break. Giménez parting was somewhat peculiar, he forced his immediate departure to the French team Olympique de Marseille by refusing to play against Werder Bremen.

Basel made a few signings before the start of the 2005–06 season. For example, forward Eduardo, who was signed permanently from Toulouse, following his successful loan spell. The young forward Felipe Caicedo was signed in from Rocafuerte Fútbol Club. Midfielders Baykal Kulaksızoğlu was signed in from FC Thun and Papa Malick Ba from CS Sfaxien, goalkeeper Louis Crayton was signed in from Concordia Basel and a number of youngsters advanced from the U-21 team including Ivan Rakitić and Zdravko Kuzmanović.

The FC Basel aims for the 2005–06 season were to retain the league title, win the cup and as well as to qualify for the UEFA Champions League group stage.

FC Basel started the season with various warm-up matches. These included teams from the Swiss lower league as well as teams from France, Croatia and Ukraine. They played six pre-season friendlies including the Uhrencup in Grenchen, winning four matches, but losing in the Uhrencup 0–2 against 1. FC Kaiserslautern and drawing the second match in this competition 2–2 against Trabzonspor. The six mid-season friendlies all ended with a victory.

During the winter break, the team had their traditional winter break soccer camp in La Manga, Spain. The defenders Daniel Majstorović and Kōji Nakata were brought in to replace Lyon-bound Patrick Müller and Murat Yakın who was to retire at the end of the season. The team played two games in their soccer camp, drawing 2–2 against German team Hamburger SV and beat local team Ciudad de Murcia 2–1. The other three winter break matches were played in Switzerland. Basel beat Locarno and beat Wohlen, bur lost against Rapid București. Of their 17 friendlies in this season, Basel won 13 matches, drew two and lost two.

== The Campaign ==
=== Domestic league ===
There were ten teams competing in the top tier 2005–06 Swiss Super League. The teams played a double round-robin in the first half of the season and then another double round-robin in the second half. There were three points for a victory and one each for a draw. The champions would enter the second qualifying round of the 2006–07 UEFA Champions League. The championship runners-up and the third placed team would enter the UEFA Cup first qualifying round. The bottom placed team would be relegated, the second last team would play a play-off against relegation.

Basel's priority aim for the season was to win the league championship for the third time in a row. Despite the 3–0 defeat by FC Thun in the second round, Basel started the season well and led the championship right until the last day of the league campaign. On 26 February 2006, FC Basel broke their own club record of 52 unbeaten league games at St. Jakob Park, later extending it to 59. The unbeaten home run ended on the final day of the season with a last-minute goal from Zürich's Iulian Filipescu giving Zürich their first national championship since 1980–81. A 60th straight home league match undefeated, would have made Basel champions for third time in a row. The final score was 1–2 in favour of Zürich. The title was lost on goal difference.

The last minute loss of the Championship and the subsequent riots, the so-called Basel Hooligan Incident, meant that the club would suffer the consequences. As well as a huge fine, the first two home games of their 2006–07 season were held completely without fans, behind closer doors. The following three matches were held with just a part of the stadium capacity, without the fans from the "Muttenzer Kurve" (the eastern fan block).

=== Domestic cup ===
Basel's clear aim for the Swiss Cup was to win it. In the first round of the 2005–06 Cup Basel were drawn away against lower league team Solothurn. Basel won this 4–1, with goals from David Degen, and Eduardo and twice Mladen Petrić. In round two they were drawn away against local lower league team Old Boys. Basel won this 6–1 and here Mile Sterjovski scored four goals and Zdravko Kuzmanović scored the other two. However, despite an early goal from Julio Hernán Rossi and two further goals from Matías Delgado, Basel were defeated in the third round home tie against FC Zürich 3–4. Basel's domestic cup aim was clearly missed. Second tier Sion won the trophy at the end of the season, beating Young Boys in the final after a penalty shoot-out.

=== Europe ===
==== Champions League qualifying round ====
As Swiss champions, Basel entered the UEFA Champions League third qualifying round and their aim was to reach the group stage. However, they were drawn against German Bundesliga club Werder Bremen and they lost 4–2 on aggregate. Three goals in eight second-half minutes in the return leg swung the tie decisively in the German side's favour.

Werder Bremen (10 August 2005)

Goals in either half from David Degen and substitute Julio Hernán Rossi ensured Christian Gross's side the advantage before the return leg at the Weserstadion on 24 August. However, the German team still had every confidence of overturning the deficit, thanks to Miroslav Klose's strike on 72 minutes. Thomas Schaaf's men were behind after 27 minutes after some lax defending. Goalkeeper Andreas Reinke was stranded after Scott Chipperfield's shot had been blocked and Degen made no mistake when well placed. The wayward defending continued into the second half, allowing Argentinian striker Rossi to double the home team's advantage on 52 minutes by drilling through Reinke's legs to the obvious delight of a sell-out 29,000 crowd at St. Jakob Park. Yet the home fans were given pause for thought when Germany forward Klose pulled one back in the closing stages.

Return match (24 August 2005)

Three goals in eight second-half minutes swing the tie decisively in the German side's favour. Until the opening goal Basel had protected Pascal Zuberbühler's goal with some ease, but a fortuitous deflection unhinged their defence after 63 minutes. A clearance from the Basel defence hit Patrick Owomoyela on the chest and the ball bounced into the penalty area, Bremen striker Ivan Klasnić was quickest to react and he tapped the ball into the empty net from close range. Basel found themselves further in arrears moments later when Johan Micoud was fouled in the penalty area by Reto Zanni. Tim Borowski made no mistake, slotting the ball into the bottom left-hand corner. The home side then guaranteed their spot into the draw for the next round, with Klasnić's second goal after 72 minutes. The striker latched on to Daniel Jensen's pass to send a left-footed strike in off the post beyond Zuberbühler from 15 metres.

==== UEFA Cup ====
Subsequently Basel dropped into the 2005–06 UEFA Cup, where they met Bosnian club NK Široki Brijeg in the first round.

NK Široki Brijeg (15 September 2005, 29 September 2005)

In the first leg of the first round Basel played at home in the St. Jakob-Park and Matías Delgado scored a hat-trick as Basel won 5–0. The return match in Široki Brijeg was also won. Basel sealed a 6–0 aggregate win to qualify for the Group stage.

Group stage

Here Basel were then drawn into Group E, alongside Strasbourg, Roma, Red Star Belgrade and Tromsø.

RC Strasbourg (20 October 2005)

Basel lost their first home match against Strasbourg 0–2 after defender Patrick Müller was sent off for pulling down Amara Diané in the 33rd minute. Diané himself had put the guests one up in the 15th minute and fellow Ivorian Arthur Boka scored a second ten minutes later.

Red Star Belgrade (3 November 2005)

An away win against Red Star Belgrade in the second match day. Rossi ran on to a pin-point pass from Matías Delgado with just two minutes remaining as Basel vanquished memories of their 0–2 defeat by RC Strasbourg on Matchday 1. It completed a well-earned turnaround after Milan Purović had given the home side the lead midway through the first half. Basel soon drew level when Delgado converted a penalty on the half-hour mark, paving the way for a thrilling win.

Tromsø IL (1 December 2005)

The Basel side rallied from being 1–3 down after 29 minutes to secure an unlikely 4–3 win to move second, while eliminating Tromsø. Tromsø had gone ahead as early as the second minute when Lars Iver Strand headed in Ole Andreas Nilsen's cross. Basel attempted to respond and came close a minute later, only for Eduardo to header over the bar, while 60 seconds later Matías Delgado also shot wide. Petrić did equalise as he fired in a left-footed shot after Smiljanić had headed Patrick Müller's free-kick into his path. However, Tromsø regained their lead three minutes later when Ole Martin Årst collected Joachim Walltin's pass before hitting an angled shot into the net from 12 metres. After 29 minutes the visitors opened up a 3–1 lead and this time Årst was the provider, playing the ball from the right for Strand to score his second of the evening. Basel piled on the pressure in the second half but were almost caught out when Patrice Bernier's header forced a save from Pascal Zuberbühler. Delgado reduced arrears when he converted a cross from Petrić just after the hour and it was all-square six minutes later when Scott Chipperfield headed in a Julio Hernán Rossi cross. With 16 minutes remaining, Basel took the lead for the first time as David Degen collected an Eduardo pass and scored from close range. Basel secured the most unlikely of wins to move into second place in the standings.

AS Roma (14 December 2005)

An away defeat against Roma followed. Roma pressed from the very first moment and it was inevitable that Rodrigo Taddei put the home team one up after just 12 minutes. But Basel reacted and fought back. Ivan Ergić saw his header rebound from the cross bar after 25 minutes and Delgado's shot rebounded from the post just two minutes later, but the equaliser did not fall. In fact Francesco Totti put the home team two up just seconds before the half time whistle and shortly after the start of the second period Shabani Nonda added a third goal. With this three goal lead, AS Roma just tried to control the game and played just in midfield. Towards the end of the game Basel turned up their efforts and after 78 minutes Mladen Petrić pulled a goal back. But it wasn't enough to turn the game and Basel lost 1–3. Because, at the same time, Strasbourg scored the 2–2 equaliser in the fourth minute of over time against Red Star Belgrade, with some luck Basel qualified for the knock-out stages.

AS Monaco (15 February 2006)

In the round of 32 Basel were drawn against AS Monaco and the first leg of this tie was played in St. Jakob-Park. Having dropped to ninth spot in the domestic league, Monaco were eager to impress on the continental stage, but always appeared vulnerable against a solid Basel outfit. The Swiss side took control of the match from the off, and went close to breaking the deadlock in the 19th minute as Lucas Bernardi cleared Eduardo's goalbound header from Mladen Petrić's long free-kick. Six minutes later Petrić dispossessed Monaco's Maicon and fizzed a fierce shot narrowly wide. Monaco playmaker Camel Meriem tested Pascal Zuberbühler in the 31st minute, and teenager Serge Gakpé was close to scoring on his European debut as the visitors pressed. Petrić, Matías Delgado and Mile Sterjovski all threatened Guillaume Warmuz's goal early in the second half, while the Monaco keeper also frustrated Bruno Berner and Petrić again before he was finally beaten by David Degen, the midfielder finishing coolly following Eduardo's pass in the 78th minute.

AS Monaco return match (23 February 2006)

After being eliminated from the Champions League in the third qualifying round back in August, Monaco president Michal Pastor had made UEFA Cup success the club's main priority, saying: "We must win it. It's a question of honour." AS Monaco FC's pledge to win the UEFA Cup this season was broken as FC Basel 1893's Swedish defender Daniel Majstorović secured a priceless equaliser at the Stade Louis II. The home side had been handed a 21st-minute lead when on-loan striker Christian Vieri converted from the penalty spot after Jaroslav Plašil was brought down by Matías Delgado. However, Basel took what proved to be the decisive advantage eleven minutes into the second period as Mladen Petrić's cross from the left was headed by Majstorović past Flavio Roma to leave Monaco needing at least two goals for victory. While substitute Olivier Kapo had a couple of good efforts late on, but Basel's nerve held and another goal was not scored. Basel won 2–1 on aggregate.

RC Strasbourg (9 March 2006)

Then, in the round of 16 Basel were drawn against Strasbourgh and were able to revenge themselves for the defeat in the Group stage. Matías Delgado scored one and set up the other as the Swiss side took the initiative, right from the start. Just eight minutes had elapsed when Argentinian midfielder Delgado picked himself up after an Edgar Loué foul and curled a superb free-kick around the wall to break the deadlock. The French team fought back in the second half, before Zdravko Kuzmanovic scored following another Delgado free kick to secure a healthy two-goal lead to take to Stade de la Meinau a week later.

RC Strasbourg return match (16 March 2006)

In the Stade de la Meinau in front of just 8,000 spectators, Brazilian striker Eduardo gave the visitors a third-minute advantage, tapping in Mladen Petrić's unselfish square ball. However, Rudy Carlier soon levelled for the home team. That lifted Strasbourg and Alexander Farnerud saw three efforts denied, before Eduardo destroyed their hopes with an emphatic volley from David Degen's left-wing cross. There were still only 26 minutes on the clock and although the game calmed down before half-time, Basel began the second period with renewed verve as Boris Smiljanić and Mile Sterjovski forced impressive saves from Nicolas Puydebois. Cédric Kanté eventually made it 2–2 at the other end with 12 minutes remaining, but it was too little, too late as the Swiss side progressed to the quarter-finals.

Middlesbrough (30 March 2006)

Basel were drawn against Middlesbrough in the quarter-finals and played the first leg at home at St. Jakob-Park. Two goals just before half-time inflicted a serious blow to the English Premiership side as Basel made the best of difficult conditions. On 43 minutes Matías Delgado collected his seventh goal of the competition when his hopeful long-range effort took a wicked bounce off the greasy surface and arced over the unfortunate Mark Schwarzer. The Australian international was beaten again before the interval as David Degen earned Basel a valuable first-leg two goal cushion. It was a deserved strike for Degen, whose tireless running proved a constant threat to the visitors' shaky defence. After Eduardo glanced a header wide on ten minutes, he was given a clearer opening when he met Degen's pullback, before testing Schwarzer with a shot on the turn. Middlesbrough, meanwhile, were limited to half-chances as Jimmy Floyd Hasselbaink drove a free-kick off target midway through the half, while a swerving attempt from Gaizka Mendieta forced Pascal Zuberbühler to tip over. With opportunities at a premium for Middlesbrough, Basel were rewarded for their endeavour through Delgado's opener, before Degen outpaced a sluggish back line to latch on to Eduardo's through-ball and drill a low shot beyond Schwarzer. The timing was terrible for Steve McClaren's men, but they responded well after the break. Hasselbaink drew a diving stop from Zuberbühler three minutes into the second period and Chris Riggott went even closer as he met a corner with a towering header. It cannoned off the crossbar, however, and Delgado repeated the feat at the other end with a free-kick as the game opened up. Riggott was on more familiar defensive duty on 70 minutes, his goalline block denying substitute Scott Chipperfield.

Middlesbrough return match (6 April 2006)

Travelling to the Riverside Stadium for the return match, Basel took an early lead. Christian Gross' Basel always looked in control, having earned a 2–0 victory on home soil during the previous week, and their grip on the tie was further strengthened by Eduardo's close-range finish midway through the first half. Mark Viduka struck twice either side of half-time to breathe fresh life into the Middlesbrough's challenge, however, and when Jimmy Floyd Hasselbaink found the net with a thunderous strike moments after the dismissal of Basel's Swedish defender Daniel Majstorovic, the momentum was with the home side. With time almost up, Massimo Maccarone slid in the winning goal from a tight angle to crown a remarkable comeback and earn a last-four tie against Steaua Bucuresti. The home team came close to halving their deficit in the opening seconds as Pascal Zuberbühler failed to collect George Boateng's high ball under pressure from Yakubu Ayegbeni, but the Nigerian international's angled shot towards the unguarded goal rolled into the side-netting. Basel then served notice of their attacking intent as Mile Sterjovski was left unmarked from a free-kick to flick an effort wide, but Middlesbrough failed to heed the warning and another set-piece proved their undoing in the 23rd minute, Boris Smiljanić nodding Mladen Petrić's free-kick across goal for Eduardo to tap in at the far post. That left the home side needing to score four times to stay in the competition, and they replied rapidly as Yakubu's physical presence unsettled the Basel defence and Viduka collected the loose ball before drilling a shot past Zuberbühler. The Basel goalkeeper preserved his side's two-goal aggregate advantage as the interval approached, however, stretching to palm Yakubu's effort around the post after a slick passing move had sliced open the visitors.

Urged on by tremendous home support Middlesbrough began the second period in frenetic fashion, with half-time substitute Hasselbaink and Viduka both forcing Zuberbühler into action. However, the Basel goalkeeper was powerless three minutes before the hour, Viduka collecting Yakubu's defence-splitting pass and rounding the goalkeeper to roll in before Majstorovic was sent off for a second bookable offence. Hasselbaink raised home hopes almost immediately with a thunderous shot from the edge of the area and just as it seemed Basel would hold out, Zuberbühler parried Fábio Rochemback's effort and Maccarone slid in the rebound from an acute angle to spark wild celebrations. Middlesbrough had fought back to win the match 4–1 and the tie 4–3.

Conclusion

Middlesbrough beat Steaua București 4–3 in the semi-final and advanced to the final, but here they were beaten 4–0 by Sevilla. In spite of being knocked out in the quarter-finals, the cup run was considered a success for Basel. Matías Emilio Delgado ended the 2005–06 UEFA Cup season as the contest's top goal scorer.

== Club ==
=== Management ===
Position	Staff
Manager	(Switzerland) Christian Gross
Assistant manager	(Switzerland) Fritz Schmid
Fitness coach	(Switzerland) Thomas Grüter
Fitness coach	(Switzerland) Romain Crevoisier
Youth team coach	(Switzerland) Heinz Hermann
Youth team co-coach	(Switzerland) Sandro Kamber

Last updated: May 2006

=== Kit ===
Supplier: Nike
Sponsor(s): Novartis

Home	Away

Source: Homepage FCB

=== Other information ===
Chairman	(Switzerland) Mr Werner Edelmann
Ground (capacity and dimensions)	St. Jakob-Park (42,500 / 120x80 m)

Source: Homepage FCB

== Players ==
=== First team squad ===
Note: Flags indicate national team as defined under FIFA eligibility rules; some limited exceptions apply. Players may hold more than one non-FIFA nationality.

No.	Pos.	Nation	Player
1	GK	SUI	Pascal Zuberbühler
3	DF	BIH	Damir Džombić
4	DF	SUI	Michel Morganella
5	DF	SWE	Daniel Majstorović
6	DF	JPN	Kōji Nakata
8	MF	AUS	Mile Sterjovski
9	FW	ARG	César Carignano
10	FW	CRO	Mladen Petrić
11	MF	AUS	Scott Chipperfield
12	MF	SEN	Papa Malick Ba
13	FW	ARG	Christian Eduardo Giménez
14	DF	ALG	Djamel Mesbah
15	DF	SUI	Murat Yakin
16	DF	SUI	Patrick Müller

No.	Pos.	Nation	Player
17	MF	CRO	Ivan Rakitić
18	GK	LBR	Louis Crayton
19	GK	BRA	Kléber
20	MF	ARG	Matías Emilio Delgado
21	MF	SUI	David Degen
22	MF	SCG	Ivan Ergić
23	FW	BRA	Eduardo
24	DF	SUI	Bruno Berner
25	GK	SUI	Riccardo Meili
27	MF	SCG	Zdravko Kuzmanović
29	MF	SUI	Baykal Kulaksızoğlu
30	DF	SUI	Boris Smiljanić
32	DF	SUI	Reto Zanni
33	FW	ARG	Julio Hernán Rossi

=== Transfers ===
==== Summer ====
===== In =====
12	MF	SEN	Papa Malick Ba (from CS Sfaxien)
23	FW	BRA	Eduardo (from Toulouse)
—	MF	SUI	Baykal Kulaksızoğlu (from FC Thun)
—	MF	CRO	Ivan Rakitić (from FC Basel U-21)
—	MF	SCG	Zdravko Kuzmanović (from FC Basel U-21)
18	GK	LBR	Louis Crayton (from FC Concordia Basel)
—	GK	ARG	Caicedo (from Rocafuerte Fútbol Club)

===== Out =====
—	DF	SUI	Sébastien Barberis (to FC Bulle – Free)
—	DF	SUI	Philipp Degen (to Borussia Dortmund – n/a)
13	FW	ARG	Christian Giménez (to Marseille)
—	DF	SUI	Benjamin Huggel (to Eintracht Frankfurt – n/a)
—	DF	BRA	Kléber (to Santos – (loan))
—	GK	AUT	Thomas Mandl (to Admira Wacker Mödling – (loan)))
—	MF	SUI	Djamel Mesbah (to FC Aarau – Free)
—	DF	SUI	Marco Zwyssig (end of career)

==== Winter ====
===== In =====
—	MF	GEO	Mikhail Kavelashvili
5	DF	SWE	Daniel Majstorović (from Twente)
6	DF	JPN	Kōji Nakata (from Marseille)

===== Out =====
16	DF	SUI	Patrick Müller (to Lyon)
33	FW	ARG	Julio Rossi (to Nantes)

== Results ==
=== Friendlies ===
==== Pre-season ====
22 June 2005 Pre-season friendly	Celerina Auswahl	0–15	Basel	San Gian, Celerina
18:30		Summary	14' (0:1) Rossi; 15' (0:2) Rossi; 18' (0:3) Rossi; 28' (0:4) Petrić; 30' (5:0) Rossi; 34' (0:6) Degen; 42' (pen. 0:7) Yakin; 47' (0:8) Giménez; 49' (0:9) Delgado; 51' (0:10) Kléber; 53' (0:11) Petrić; 63' (0:12) Giménez; 66' (0:13) Petrić; 75' (0:14) Petrić; 90' (0:15) Petrić	Attendance: 921; Referee: Patric Collet

25 June 2005 Pre-season friendly	Vaduz	2–3	Basel	Sportanlage Rheinwiese, Schaan
17:30	Pohja 11' (1:0); Stocklasa (yellow card); Polverino 74' (2:3)	Summary	26' (1:1) Petrić; 36' (1:2) Petrić; 58' (3:1) D. Degen	Attendance: 920; Referee: Valerio Figaroli

1 July 2005 Pre-season friendly	Basel	4–3	Shakhtar Donetsk	Stadion Gitterli, Liestal
20:00	Giménez 18' (1:0); Petrić 23' (2:0); Sterjovski 66' (3:2); Sterjovski 73' (4:2)	Summary	43' (2:1) Srna; 61' (2:2) Ruslan; 81' (pen. 4:3) Stoican	Attendance: 1,800; Referee: Claudio Circhetta

6 July 2005 Uhrencup	Basel	0–2	1. FC Kaiserslautern	Stadion Brühl, Grenchen
20:15		Summary	56' (0:1) Altıntop; 73' (0:2) Seitz	Attendance: 4,868; Referee: Guido Wildhaber

8 July 2005 Uhrencup	Basel	2–2	Trabzonspor	Stadion Brühl, Grenchen
20:45	Giménez 9' (pen. 1:0); Chipperfield 35' (2:0)	Summary	(penalty missed) 50′ Yattara; 52' (pen. 2:1) Karadeniz; 55' (2:2) Yılmaz	Attendance: 6,912

12 July 2005 Pre-season friendly	Basel	4–2	Sochaux	Stade Léon Burrus, Boncourt
19:20	Chipperfield 1' (1:0); Delgado 33' (2:0); Sterjovski 53' (3:0); Rossi 64' (pen. 4:1)	Summary	54' (3:1) Kader; 83' (4:2) Kader	Attendance: 2,500; Referee: Guido Wildhaber

26 July 2005 Mid-season friendly	Basel	2–0	SC Freiburg	Stadion Schützenmatte, Basel
19:30	Sterjovski 25' (1:0); Degen 32' (2:0); Degen (yellow card) 85'	Summary	(yellow card) 90' Wolfarth	Attendance: 3,400; Referee: Nicole Petignat

2 August 2005 Mid-season friendly	Basel	2–1	Parma	Stadion Rankhof, Basel
19:00	Delgado 33' (1:0); Petrić 70' (2:1)	Summary	63' (1:1) Rosina	Attendance: 926; Referee: René Rogalla

16 August 2005 Mid-season friendly	SV Muttenz	1–3	Basel	Margelacker, Muttenz
19:00	Leganyi 36' (1:0)	Summary	41' (1:1) Rossi; 74' (1:2) Eduardo; 78' (1:3) Sterjovski	Attendance: 1,400; Referee: Claudio Circhetta

6 September 2005 Mid-season	Kreuzlingen	1–6	Basel	Sportplatz Burgerfeld, Kreuzlingen
19:00	Šabanović 67' (1:5)	Summary	16' (0:1) Rossi; 57' (0:5) Delgado; 36' (0:3) Rossi; 41' (0:4) Eduardo; 57' (0:5) Delgado; 70' (1:6) Zanni	Attendance: 1,500; Referee: Nikolaj Hänni

11 October 2005 Mid-season	FC Aesch	0–12	Basel	Löhrenacker, Aesch
17:00		Summary	11' (0:1) Sterjovski; 23' (0:2) Eduardo; 35' (0:3) Delgado; 36' (0:4) Ergić; 42' (0:5) Sterjovski; 62' (0:7) Mesbah; 68' (0:8) Eduardo; 75' (0:9) De Ferreira; 80' (0:10) Thüring; 86' (0:11) Sterjovski; 88' (0:12) Eduardo	Attendance: 2,200 (sold out); Referee: Adrien Jaccottet

15 November 2005 Mid-season	Nordstern	0–5	Basel	Rankhof, Basel
18:30		Summary	37' (0:1) Zanni; 39' (0:2) Petrić; 42' (0:3) Rossi; 58' (0:4) Sterjovski; 80' (0:5) Delgado	Attendance: 500; Referee: Adrien Jaccottet

==== Winter break friendlies ====
17 January 2006 Winter camp	Hamburger SV	2–2	Basel	Sportplatz La Manga, La Manga
20:15	Takahara 10' (1:0); Takahara 62' (2:2)	Summary	14' (1:1) Petrić; 51' (1:2) Eduardo	Attendance: 100; Referee: Diego Lopez Martinez

19 January 2006 Winter camp	Ciudad de Murcia	1–2	Basel	Sportplatz La Manga, La Manga
16:30	Jiménez 76' (1:1)	Summary	10' (0:1) Eduardo; 85' (1:2) Berner	Attendance: 150; Referee: Juan Perez Perentiguez (Alicante)

29 January 2006 Winter break	Basel	5–1	Locarno	Stadion Schützenmatte, Basel
13:00	Sterjovski 16' (1:0); Caicedo 36' (2:0); Caicedo 40' (3:0); Kuzmanović 58' (4:1); Delgado 72' (5:1)	Summary	51' (3:1) Arnold	Attendance: 450; Referee: Daniel Wermelinger

1 February 2006 Winter break	Basel	2–0	Wohlen	Stadion Schützenmatte, Basel
19:00	Degen 8' (1:0); Delgado 77' (pen. 2:0)	Summary		Attendance: 200; Referee: Markus Von Känel

5 February 2006 Winter break	Basel	1–2	Rapid București	Stâde Municipal Payerne
14:30	Delgado 46' (1:1)	Summary	8' (0:1) Burdujan; 62' (pen. 1:2) Nicoliță	Attendance: 186; Referee: Bruno Grossen

=== Swiss Super League ===
==== First half of season ====
19 July 2005 Round 1	Basel	1–0	Schaffhausen	St. Jakob-Park, Basel
19:30	Ergić 36' (1:0)	Summary	(yellow card) 56' Maric; (yellow card) 81' Sereinig	Attendance: 20,884; Referee: (Switzerland) Cyril Zimmermann
Note: 8 – 2 Corners

22 July 2005 Round 2	Thun	3–0	Basel	Stadion Lachen, Thun
19:30	Adriano (yellow card) 31'; Lustrinelli 61' (1:0); Lustrinelli 69' (2:0); Vieira 80' (3:0)	Summary	(yellow card) 11' Kulaksızoğlu	Attendance: 8,000; Referee: (Switzerland) Massimo Busacca

30 July 2005 Round 3	Basel	2–1	Zürich	St. Jakob-Park, Basel
19:30	Degen 20' (1:0); Delgado 49' (2:0); Chipperfield (yellow card) 54'; Delgado (yellow card) 79'	Summary	42' (2:1) Tararache; (yellow card) 53' Nef; (yellow card) 54' Džemaili; (yellow card) 84' Schneider; (yellow card) 85' Akihalaia; (yellow card) 85' Margairaz	Attendance: 25,939; Referee: (Switzerland) Markus Nobs, (Wohlen)

6 August 2005 Round 4	Yverdon-Sport	1–2	Basel	Stade Municipal, Yverdon-les-Bains
19:30	Gomes 60' (1:1); Marazzi (yellow card) 87'; N'Diaye (yellow card) 90'	Summary	19' (0:1) Sterjovski; (yellow card) 30' Petrić; 69' (1:2) Sterjovski; (yellow card) 73' Ba	Attendance: 4,060; Referee: (Switzerland) Nicole Petignat

14 August 2005 Round 5	St. Gallen	3–3	Basel	Espenmoos, St. Gallen
16:15	Hassli 35' (1:2); Koubský 60' (2:3); Marić (yellow card) 78'; Hassli 83' (pen. 3:3)	Summary	5' (0:1) Petrić; 13' (0:2), 58' (1:3) Giménez; (yellow card) 51' Ba; (yellow card) 71' (yellow-red card) 82' Kulaksızoğlu; (yellow card) 79' Degen; (yellow card) 81' Rossi	Attendance: 11,300; Referee: (Switzerland) Jérôme Laperrière

20 August 2005 Round 6	Basel	7–2	Aarau	St. Jakob-Park, Basel
19:30	Giménez 17' (1:0); Giménez 49' (2:0); Giménez 56' (3:0); Chipperfield (yellow card) 51'; Delgado 69' (4:1); Petrić 75' (5:1); Sterjovski 79' (6:0); Delgado 90+1' (7:2)	Summary	(yellow card) 14' Inler; 64' (3:1) Giallanza; 76' (5:2) Bieli; (yellow card) 62' Simo; (yellow card) 88' Vardanyan	Attendance: 22,258; Referee: (Switzerland) Massimo Busacca

27 August 2005 Round 7	Basel	3–0	Neuchâtel Xamax	St. Jakob-Park, Basel
19:30	Delgado 41' (1:0); Eduardo 51' (2:0); Delgado 65' (3:0)	Summary	(yellow card) 26' Mangane; (yellow card) 47' Besle	Attendance: 20,413; Referee: (Switzerland) Markus Nobs, (Wohlen)

11 September 2005 Round 8	Grasshoppers	2–2	Basel	Hardturm, Zürich
16:15	Cabanas 29' (1:2); Mitreski (yellow card) 44'; Rogério (yellow card) 71'; Rogério 90+6' (2:2)	Summary	6' (pen. 0:1) Delgado; 22' (0:2) Rossi; (yellow card) 83' Chipperfield	Attendance: 11,800; Referee: (Switzerland) Leuba

22 September 2005 Round 9	Basel	1–1	Young Boys	St. Jakob-Park, Basel
	Rossi (yellow card) 4'; Rossi 7' (1:0); Degen (yellow card) 59'; Chipperfield (red card) 62'		(yellow card) 4' Varela; (yellow card) 5' Schwegler; (yellow card) 24' Magnin; 53' (1:1) João Paulo; (yellow card) 67' Daniel	Attendance: 24,226; Referee: (Switzerland) Bertolini

25 September 2005 Round 10	Schaffhausen	1–2	Basel	Stadion Breite, Schaffhausen
16:15	Bunjaku 68' (1:2); Tarone (yellow card) 90'	Summary	34' (0:1) Delgado; 55' (0:2) Eduardo; (yellow card) 62' Smiljanić; (yellow card) 90' Sterjovski	Attendance: 5,200; Referee: (Switzerland) Kever

2 October 2005 Round 11	Basel	5–1	Thun	St. Jakob-Park, Basel
16:00	Müller (yellow card) 7'; Degen 36' (1:0); Petrić 60' (2:0); Petrić 63' (3:0); Petrić 79' (4:0); Ba 88' (5:1)	Summary	(yellow card) 22' Deumi; 86' (4:1) Şen	Attendance: 24,525; Referee: (Switzerland) Massimo Busacca

16 October 2005 Round 12	Zürich	2–4	Basel	Hardturm, Zürich
16:15	Stucki (yellow card) 17'; Filipescu (yellow card) 27'; Margairaz 70' (1:4); Di Jorio (yellow card) 89'; Raffael 90+4' (2:4)	Summary	21' (0:1) Degen; 27' (0:2) Delgado; 33' (0:3) Eduardo; (yellow card) 36' Rossi; 66' (0:4) Delgado	Attendance: 18,400 (sold out); Referee: (Switzerland) Guido Wildhaber

29 October 2005 Round 13	Basel	3–1	Yverdon-Sport	St. Jakob-Park, Basel
19:30	Degen 4' (1:0); Chipperfield 18' (2:0); Kulaksızoğlu (yellow card) 34'; Delgado 66' (3:1); Smiljanić (yellow card) 74'	Summary	35' (2:1) Aguirre; (yellow card) 51' Jaquet	Attendance: 18,929; Referee: (Switzerland) Jérôme Laperrière

6 November 2005 Round 14	Basel	1–0	St. Gallen	St. Jakob-Park, Basel
16:15	Zanni 6' (1:0); Chipperfield (yellow card) 14'; Sterjovski (yellow card) 86'	Summary	(yellow card) 4' Marić; (yellow card) 56' Tachie-Mensah	Attendance: 23,132; Referee: (Switzerland) René Rogalla

20 November 2005 Round 15	Aarau	0–2	Basel	Stadion Brügglifeld, Aarau
16:00	Tcheutchoua (yellow card) 10'	Summary	18' (0:1) Ba; (yellow card) 20' Degen; (yellow card) 35' Smiljanić; 82' (0:2) Rossi	Attendance: 6,600; Referee: (Switzerland) Reto Tutz

28 November 2005 Round 16	Neuchâtel Xamax	P – P	Basel	Stade de la Maladière (1924), Neuchâtel

4 December 2005 Round 17	Basel	1–0	Grasshoppers	St. Jakob-Park, Basel
	Delgado 6' (pen.); Ba (yellow card) 44'; Eduardo (yellow card) 73'		(yellow card) 3' Sutter; (yellow card) 56' Touré; (yellow card) 61' Stepanovs	Attendance: 25,270; Referee: (Switzerland) Massimo Busacca

7 December 2005 Round 16	Neuchâtel Xamax	3–2	Basel	Stade Olympique de la Pontaise, Lausanne
20:00	Lubamba 33' (pen. 1:1); Rey 43' (2:0); Rey (yellow card) 54'; Mangane (yellow card) 60'; Coly 78' (3:1)	Summary	24' (0:1) Smiljanić; 89' (3:2) Petrić	Attendance: 1,500; Referee: (Switzerland) Salm

11 December 2005 Round 18	Young Boys	1–6	Basel	Stade de Suisse, Bern
	Raimondi 20' (1:1); Tiago (yellow card) 23'		10' (0:1) Degen; 22' (1:2) Smiljanić; (yellow card) 28' Delgado; 26' (1:3) Ergić; 44' (1:4) Eduardo; 60' (1:5) Delgado; 80' (1:6) Sterjovski	Attendance: 27,547; Referee: (Switzerland) René Rogalla

==== Second half of season ====
12 February 2006 Round 19	Zürich	1–1	Basel	Hardturm, Zürich
16:15	Džemaili 74' (1:1); Von Bergen (yellow card) 65'; Filipescu (yellow card) 66'	Summary	(yellow card) 8' Degen; 71' (0:1) Petrić	Attendance: 18,400 (sold out); Referee: (Switzerland) Jérôme Laperrière

19 February 2006 Round 20	Basel	1–1	Schaffhausen	St. Jakob-Park, Basel
16:00	Majstorović 3' (1:0); Kuzmanović (yellow card) 36'; Delgado (yellow card) 75'	Summary	30' (1:1) Pires; (yellow card) 22' Diogo; (yellow card) 82' Pires; (yellow card) 90' Truckenbrod	Attendance: 17,644; Referee: (Switzerland) René Rogalla

26 February 2006 Round 21	Basel	2–1	Yverdon-Sport	St. Jakob-Park, Basel
16:00	Zanni (yellow card) 25'; Degen (yellow card) 34'; Nakata 45' (1:1); Sterjovski 63' (2:1)	Summary	16' (o.g. 0:1) Smiljanić; (yellow card) 18' El Haimour; (yellow card) 34' Dugić; (yellow card) 49' Marcão; (red card) 90' Tournut	Attendance: 12,947; Referee: (Switzerland) Reto Rutz

4 March 2006 Round 22	Thun	1–1	Basel	Stadion Lachen, Thun
17:30	Deumi (yellow card) 50' (yellow-red card) 75'; Gelson 90+2' (1:1)	Summary	7' (0:1) Eduardo; (yellow card) 23' Duruz; (yellow card) 37' Degen	Attendance: 4,300; Referee: (Switzerland) Salm

12 March 2006 Round 23	Basel	2–1	Grasshoppers	St. Jakob-Park, Basel
16:15	Eduardo 21' (1:0); Eduardo (yellow card) 21'; Delgado (yellow card) 67'; Kavelashvili 90' (2:1)	Summary	(yellow card) 16' Seoane; (yellow card) 24' Muff; 35' (1:1) dos Santos; (yellow card) 42' dos Santos; (yellow card) 55' Leandro	Attendance: 21,042; Referee: (Switzerland) Markus Nobs, (Wohlen)

19 March 2006 Round 24	St. Gallen	2–2	Basel	Espenmoos, St. Gallen
16:15	Calla 1' (1:0); Tachie-Mensah 69' (2:1)	Summary	52' (1:1) Ergić; 90+2' Smiljanić; (red card) 90+3' Sterjovski	Referee: (Switzerland) Guido Wildhaber

22 March 2006 Round 25	Basel	1–1	Aarau	St. Jakob-Park, Basel
19:30	Nakata (yellow card) 39'; Kavelashvili 82' (1:1)	Summary	(yellow card) 38' Carreño; 53' (0:1) Bieli; (yellow card) 77' Colomba; (yellow card) 80' Baning; (yellow card) 85' Simo	Attendance: 17,232; Referee: (Switzerland) Salm

26 March 2006 Round 26	Neuchâtel Xamax	P – P	Basel	La Charrière, La Chaux-de-Fonds

2 April 2006 Round 27	Basel	2–0	Young Boys	St. Jakob-Park, Basel
16:00	Berner (yellow card) 54'; Petrić 86' (1:0); Majstorović 90' (pen. 2:0)	Summary	(yellow card) 39' P. Schwegler; (yellow card) 72' Everson	Attendance: 24,425; Referee: (Switzerland) Massimo Busacca

2 April 2006 Round 28	Young Boys	P – P	Basel	Stade de Suisse, Bern

9 April 2006 Round 29	Basel	2–1	Neuchâtel Xamax	St. Jakob-Park, Basel
16:00	Chipperfield 27' (1:0); Ba (yellow card) 28'; Majstorović 49' (2:1)	Summary	(yellow card) 14' Šehić; 37' (1:1) Šehić; (yellow card) 50' Geiger; (yellow card) 80' Aka'a	Attendance: 17,855; Referee: (Switzerland) Nicole Petignat

12 April 2006 Round 30	Aarau	1–5	Basel	Stadion Brügglifeld, Aarau
19:30	Bieli 43' (1:2); Christ (red card) 66'	Summary	14' (0:1) Chipperfield; (yellow card) 28' Eduardo; 35' (0:2) Petrić; 48' (1:3) Chipperfield; 54' (1:4) Ergić; (yellow card) 69' Delgado; 87' (1:5) Kavelashvili	Attendance: 5,300; Referee: (Switzerland) Jérôme Laperrière

15 April 2006 Round 26	Neuchâtel Xamax	1–5	Basel	La Charrière, La Chaux-de-Fonds
18:45	Maraninchi (yellow card) 8'; Coly 76' (1:5)	Summary	8' (0:1) Petrić; 10' (0:2) Chipperfield; 20' (0:3) Delgado; 50' (0:4) Sterjovski; (yellow card) 52' Nakata; 54' (0:5) Degen	Attendance: 3,500; Referee: (Switzerland) René Rogalla

20 April 2006 Round 31	Basel	3–1	St. Gallen	St. Jakob-Park, Basel
19:30	Majstorović 40' (1:0); Chipperfield (yellow card) 56'; Delgado 61' (2:1); Petrić 63' (3:1)	Summary	(yellow card) 56' Cerrone; 55' (1:1) Ljubojević	Attendance: 21,779; Referee: (Switzerland) Sascha Kever

23 April 2006 Round 32	Grasshoppers	1–1	Basel	Hardturm, Zürich
16:15	Touré 32' (1:0); Denicolà (yellow card) 82'	Summary	70' (o.g. 1:1) Mitreski; (yellow card) 62' Petrić; (yellow card) 86' Degen	Attendance: 11,800; Referee: (Switzerland) Massimo Busacca

29 April 2006 Round 33	Basel	2–0	Thun	St. Jakob-Park, Basel
17:45	Delgado 6' (1:0); Petrić 8' (2:0)	Summary		Attendance: 21,229; Referee: (Switzerland) Cyril Zimmermann
Note: No yellow cards

3 May 2006 Round 34	Yverdon-Sport	1–3	Basel	Stade Municipal, Yverdon-les-Bains
20:15	N'Diaye (yellow card) 8'; Rogério 89' (1:3)	Summary	35' (0:1) Majstorović; 51' (0:2) Petrić; 87' (0:3) Sterjovski	Attendance: 4,320; Referee: (Switzerland) René Rogalla

6 May 2006 Round 35	Schaffhausen	0–4	Basel	Stadion Breite, Schaffhausen
17:45	Silva (yellow card) 16'; Sereinig (yellow card) 53'	Summary	4' (0:1) Delgado; 53' (0:2) Kuzmanović; 63' (0:3) Delgado; 88' (0:4) Kavelashvili	Attendance: 6,100; Referee: (Switzerland) Reto Rutz

10 May 2006 Round 28	Young Boys	4–2	Basel	Stade de Suisse, Bern
19:30	Yapi 28' (1:0); Yakin 41' (2:0); Tiago 69' (3:1); João Paulo 78' (4:1); Varella (yellow card) 53' (yellow-red card) 90+2'	Summary	(yellow card) 20' Degen; (yellow card) 50' Zanni; 51' (2:1) Petrić; (yellow card) 60' Kuzmanović; 90+3' (4:2) Delgado	Attendance: 24,809; Referee: (Switzerland) Jérôme Laperrière

13 May 2006 Round 36	Basel	1–2	Zürich	St. Jakob-Park, Basel
17:45	Delgado (yellow card) 6'; Petrić 72' (1:1); Petrić (yellow card) 80'	Summary	(yellow card) 25' Von Bergen; 30' (0:1) Keita; (yellow card) 38' Schneider; (yellow card) 45' Margairaz; (yellow card) 59' Leoni; (yellow card) 83' Filipescu; 90+2' (1:2) Filipescu	Attendance: 32,712 (sold out); Referee: (Switzerland) Massimo Busacca

==== Final league table ====
Pos	Team	Pld	W	D	L	GF	GA	GD	Pts	Qualification or relegation
1	Zürich (C)	36	23	9	4	86	36	+50	78	Qualification to Champions League second qualifying round
2	Basel	36	23	9	4	87	42	+45	78	Qualification to UEFA Cup first qualifying round
3	Young Boys	36	17	11	8	60	46	+14	62	Qualification to UEFA Cup first qualifying round
4	Grasshopper	36	14	13	9	44	33	+11	55	Qualification to Intertoto Cup second round
5	Thun	36	14	7	15	50	53	−3	49	
6	St. Gallen	36	11	7	18	51	56	−5	40	
7	Aarau	36	8	11	17	29	63	−34	35	
8	Schaffhausen	36	7	12	17	32	55	−23	33	
9	Neuchâtel Xamax (R)	36	9	6	21	41	70	−29	33	Qualification to relegation play-off
10	Yverdon-Sport (R)	36	9	5	22	38	64	−26	32	Relegation to Swiss Challenge League

Source: RSSSF
Rules for classification: 1) points; 2) goal difference; 3) number of goals scored.
(C) Champions; (R) Relegated

=== Swiss Cup ===
==== 2005–06 Swiss Cup ====
19 September 2005 Round 1	Solothurn	1–4	Basel	Stadion FC Solothurn, Solothurn
19:00	Rickli (yellow card) 30'; Mendi 66' (1:2)	Summary	57' (0:1) Degen; 65' (0:2) Eduardo; 67' (1:3) Petrić; (yellow card) 77' Zanni; 85' (1:4) Petrić	Attendance: 4,950; Referee: (Switzerland) Cyril Zimmermann

22 October 2005 Round 2	Old Boys	1–6	Basel	Stadion Schützenmatte, Basel,
17:30	Meyer (yellow card) 40'; Roussel (yellow card) 59'; Derdiyok 75' (1:5); Derdiyok (yellow card) 76'	Summary	11' (0:1) Sterjovski; 16' (0:2) Sterjovski; 50' (0:3) Sterjovski; 60' (0:4) Kuzmanović; 73' (0:5) Sterjovski; 81' (2:6) Kuzmanović	Attendance: 6,200; Referee: (Switzerland) Claudio Circhetta

18 December 2005 Round 3	Basel	3–4	Zürich	St. Jakob-Park, Basel
16:00	Rossi 12' (1:0); Delgado 32' (2:1); Ba (yellow card) 37'; Smiljanić (yellow card) 61'; Degen (yellow card) 80'; Delgado 70' (3:4); Rossi (yellow card) 90+2'	Summary	(yellow card) 9' Stahel; (yellow card) 13' Keita; 23' (1:1) Tararache; (yellow card) 31' Filipescu; 42' (2:2) César; 51' (2:3) Raffael; 69' (2:4) Džemaili; (yellow card) 83' Nef	Attendance: 17,469; Referee: (Switzerland) Guido Wildhaber

=== UEFA Champions League ===
For more information, see 2005–06 UEFA Champions League

==== Third qualifying round ====
10 August 2005 First Leg	Basel (Switzerland)	2–1	(Germany) Werder Bremen	St. Jakob-Park, Basel
20:45	D. Degen 28' (1:0); Rossi 52' (2:0); Quennoz (yellow card) 84'	UEFA summary FCB summary	(yellow card) 23' Jelle Van Damme; (yellow card) 62' Davala; 74' (2:1) Klose	Attendance: 28,101; Referee: (Belgium) Paul Allaerts, (KBVB)

24 August 2005 Second Leg	Werder Bremen (Germany)	3–0	(Switzerland) Basel	Weserstadion, Bremen
20:45	Klose (yellow card) 28' (yellow-red card) 79'; Klasnić 65' (1:0); Borowski 68' (pen. 2:0); Klasnić 73' (3:0)	UEFA summary FCB summary	(yellow card) 2' D. Degen; (yellow card) 40' Eduardo	Attendance: 30,000; Referee: (Denmark) Kim Milton Nielsen (DBU)

Werder Bremen won 4–2 on aggregate.

=== UEFA Cup ===
==== First round ====
All times CET

15 September 2005 First Leg	Basel (Switzerland)	5–0	(Bosnia and Herzegovina) Široki Brijeg	St. Jakob-Park, Basel
19:30	Delgado 10' (1:0); Ergić 70' (2:0); Delgado 78' (3:0); Eduardo 85' (4:0); Delgado 88' (5:0)	UEFA summary FCB summary	(yellow card) 15' (yellow-red card) 53' Rezic; (yellow card) 23' Kozul	Attendance: 14,458; Referee: (Hungary) Zsolt Szabo (MLSZ)

29 September 2005 Second Leg	Široki Brijeg (Bosnia and Herzegovina)	0–1	(Switzerland) Basel	Stadion Pecara, Široki Brijeg
19:30		UEFA summary FCB summary	Petrić 8' (0:1)	Referee: (Finland) Tony Asumaa (SPL)

Basel won 6–0 on aggregate.

==== Group stage / Group E ====
20 October 2005 First match day	Basel (Switzerland)	0–2	(France) Strasbourg	St. Jakob-Park, Basel
19:30	Müller (red card) 30'; Degen (yellow card) 55'; Chipperfield (yellow card) 76'	UEFA summary FCB summary	15' (0:1) Diané; 25' (0:2) Boka; (yellow card) 68' Johansen	Attendance: 16,623; Referee: (England) Mark Halsey (FA)

3 November 2005 Second match day	Red Star Belgrade (Serbia and Montenegro)	1–2	(Switzerland) Basel	Stadion FK Crvena zvezda, Belgrade
17:00	Purović 25' (1:0); Mladenović (yellow card) 54'; Basta (yellow card) 59'; Dudić (yellow card) 65'	UEFA summary FCB summary	30' (pen. 1:1) Delgado; (yellow card) 57' Delgado; (yellow card) 77' Zanni; 88' (1:2) Rossi	Attendance: 0 (closed doors); Referee: (Denmark) Knud Erik Fisker (DBU)

1 December 2005 Fourth match day	Basel (Switzerland)	4–3	(Norway) Tromsø	St. Jakob-Park, Basel
20:45	Petrić 17' (1:1); Delgado 61' (2:3); Chipperfield 67' (3:3); Degen 75' (4:3)	UEFA summary FCB summary	2' (0:1) Strand; 19' (1:2) Årst; 29' (1:3) Strand; (yellow card) 82' Kibebe	Attendance: 14,887; Referee: (Poland) Krzysztof Slupik (PZPN)

14 December 2005 Fifth match day	Roma (Italy)	3–1	(Switzerland) Basel	Stadio Olimpico, Rome
20:45	Taddei 12' (1:0); Totti 45' (2:0); Nonda 49' (3:0); Chivu (yellow card) 61'	UEFA summary FCB summary	78' (3:1) Petrić; (yellow card) 82' Eduardo	Attendance: 16,000; Referee: (Germany) Helmut Fleischer (DFB)

Pos	Team	Pld	W	D	L	GF	GA	GD	Pts	Qualification
1	(France) Strasbourg	4	2	2	0	7	3	+4	8	Advance to knockout stage
2	(Italy) Roma	4	2	1	1	7	6	+1	7	Advance to knockout stage
3	(Switzerland) Basel	4	2	0	2	7	9	−2	6	Advance to knockout stage
4	(Serbia and Montenegro) Red Star Belgrade	4	1	1	2	7	8	−1	4	
5	(Norway) Tromsø	4	1	0	3	7	9	−2	3	

==== Round of 32 ====
15 February 2006 First Leg	Basel (Switzerland)	1–0	(France) Monaco	St. Jakob-Park, Basel
18:00	Degen 78' (1:0)	UEFA summary FCB summary		Attendance: 14,143; Referee: (Netherlands) Pieter Vink (KNVB)
Note: No yellow cards

23 February 2006 Second Leg	Monaco (France)	1–1	(Switzerland) Basel	Stade Louis II, Monaco
20:45	Bernardi (yellow card) 9'; Vieri 21' (pen. 1:0); Chevantón (yellow card) 76'	UEFA summary FCB summary	(yellow card) 38' Smiljanić; 56' (1:1) Majstorović; (yellow card) 56' Majstorović; (yellow card) 71' Zanni	Attendance: 11,955; Referee: (Cyprus) Costas Kapitanis (CFA)

Basel won 2–1 on aggregate.

==== Round of 16 ====
9 March 2006 First Leg	Basel (Switzerland)	2–0	(France) Strasbourg	St. Jakob-Park, Basel
20:15	Delgado 8' (1:0); Ba (yellow card) 22'; Kuzmanović 89' (2:0)	UEFA summary FCB summary	(yellow card) 14' P. Farnerud; (yellow card) 57' Lacour; (yellow card) 69' Deroff; (yellow card) 73' Abdessadki; (yellow card) 90+2' Bellaïd	Attendance: 14,243; Referee: (Italy) Stefano Farina (FIGC)

15 March 2006 Second Leg	Strasbourg (France)	2–2	(Switzerland) Basel	Stade de la Meinau, Strasbourg
18:00	Carlier 11' (1:1); Kanté 78' (2:2)	UEFA summary FCB summary	3' (0:1) Eduardo; 26' (1:2) Eduardo	Referee: (Portugal) Olegário Benquerença (FPF)
Note: No yellow cards

Basel won 4–2 on aggregate.

==== Quarter-finals ====
30 March 2006 First Leg	Basel (Switzerland)	2–0	(England) Middlesbrough	St. Jakob-Park, Basel
20:45	D. Degen (yellow card) 29'; Majstorović (yellow card) 40'; Delgado 43'; D. Degen 45+1'	UEFA summary FCB summary	(yellow card) 53' Downing; (yellow card) 77' Riggott	Attendance: 23,639; Referee: (Italy) Roberto Rosetti (FIGC)

6 April 2006 Second Leg	Middlesbrough (England)	4–1	(Switzerland) Basel	Riverside Stadium, Middlesbrough
21:00	Riggott (yellow card) 24'; Viduka 33' (1:1); Parnaby (yellow card) 44'; Viduka 57' (2:1); Hasselbaink 79' (3:1); Maccarone 90' (4:1); Maccarone (yellow card) 90+1'	UEFA summary FCB summary	23' (0:1) Eduardo; (yellow card) 55' (yellow-red card) 74' Majstorović; (yellow card) 58' D. Degen; (yellow card) 90+3' Zuberbühler	Attendance: 24,521; Referee: (Russia) Yuri Baskakov (RFS)

Middlesbrough won 4–3 on aggregate.

== Sources ==
- Rotblau: Jahrbuch Saison 2015/2016. Publisher: FC Basel Marketing AG. ISBN 978-3-7245-2050-4
- Rotblau: Jahrbuch Saison 2017/2018. Publisher: FC Basel Marketing AG. ISBN 978-3-7245-2189-1
- Die ersten 125 Jahre / 2018. Publisher: Josef Zindel im Friedrich Reinhardt Verlag, Basel. ISBN 978-3-7245-2305-5
- FCB squad 2005–06 at fcb-archiv.ch
- Switzerland 2005–06 at RSSSF
