= 2007–08 Swiss Cup =

Tournament details
- Country: Switzerland
- Teams: 64

Final positions
- Champions: FC Basel
- Runners-up: AC Bellinzona

Tournament statistics
- Top goal scorer: Jocelyn Roux (7)

The 2007–08 Swiss Cup (Swisscom Cup) was the 83rd season of Switzerland's football knockout competition. The winner was FC Basel. AC Bellinzona qualified for the UEFA Cup after finishing as runner-up due to Basel qualifying for the UEFA Champions League.

== Format ==
In season 2007-08 the tournament structure was changed. The 10 clubs from the Swiss Super League as well as the 17 clubs of the Swiss Challenge League qualified directly for the cup and entered in the round of 64. FC Vaduz were not included in the cup as they play in the Liechtenstein Cup. 11 clubs from the 1st league as well as 26 clubs from the amateur leagues had to qualify in regional tournaments for the Swisscom Cup. This was played in the knockout system. Each round was held earlier because of the Euro 2008. The final was held in April instead of May or June.

Each match was played over ninety minutes with extra time and a penalty shootout if required.

Round of 64 (15 and 16 September 2007) : The winning teams qualify for the 1/32 Finals.

Round of 32 (20 and 21 October 2007) : The winning teams qualify for the 1/16 Finals.

Round of 16 (24 and 25 of November 2007) : The winning teams qualify for the Quarter-Finals.

Quarter Finals (15 and 16 of December 2007) : The winning teams qualify for the Semi-Finals.

Semifinals (27 and 28 of February 2008) : 4 teams, the victors qualify for the Final.

Final (6 April 2008) : The victor wins the 83rd Swiss cup.

== Participating clubs ==
2007–08 Super League; 10 teams	2007–08 Challenge League; 17 teams	2007–08 1. Liga; 11 teams	Amateur teams 24 teams
BSC Young Boys; FC Aarau; FC Basel; Grasshoppers Zürich; FC Luzern; Neuchâtel Xamax; FC Sion; FC St. Gallen; FC Thun; FC Zürich	AC Bellinzona; SC Cham; FC Chiasso; FC Concordia Basel; SR Delémont; FC Gossau; SC Kriens; FC La Chaux-de-Fonds; FC Lausanne-Sport; FC Locarno; AC Lugano; FC Schaffhausen; Servette FC; FC Wil; FC Winterthur; FC Wohlen; Yverdon-Sport FC	GC Biaschesi; Etoile-Carouge FC; FC Baden; FC Baulmes; FC Biel-Bienne; SC Düdingen; FC Echallens; FC Red Star Zürich; Stade Nyonnais; FC Tuggen; Urania Genève Sport	Fourth level: FC Bavois; FC Bazenheid; FC Hägendorf; FC Langenthal; FC Le Mont, Laussanne; AC Malcantone; FC Massongex; FC Porrentruy; Racing Club Genève; FC Sarnen; FC Seefeld, Zürich; FC Stade Lausanne Ouchy; FC Versoix; Fifth level: FC Bern; SC Binningen; ASC Gordola; FC Colombier; FC Flawil; FC Léchelles; FC Lusitanos; FC Orpund; FC Töss; FC Winkeln, St. Gallen; Sixth level: FC Herrliberg

== Round 1 ==
Teams in the Super League and Challenge league are seeded cannot play each other. The team that is in a lower league plays at home advantage.

Team 1	Score	Team 2
14 September 2007
FC Biel Bienne	1–1 (a.e.t.) (p. 6–7)	Yverdon-Sport FC
FC Baulmes	2–1	SR Delémont
FC Wettingen 93	1–3	SC Kriens
Racing Club GE	4–1	FC La Chaux-de-Fonds
15 September 2007
FC Bazenheid	0–7	AC Bellinzona
FC Echallens	0–3 (a.e.t.)	FC Lausanne-Sport
FC Red Star Zürich	0–5	FC Winterthur
FC Seefeld ZH	0–4	Grasshopper Club Zürich
FC Versoix	0–5	Stade Nyonnais
FC Winkeln SG	2–6	FC Gossau
FC Herrliberg	0–6	FC Zürich
SC Düdingen	1–3 (a.e.t.)	FC Concordia BS
FC Bern	1–2	FC Langenthal
FC Orpund	1–2	SC Binningen
FC Sarnen	1–7	FC Aarau
SC Brühl SG	4–6	FC Schaffhausen
FC Baden	1–2	FC Locarno
FC Le Mont LS	0–2	Neuchâtel Xamax
FC Töss	0–8	FC St. Gallen
FC UGS	0–7	FC Sion
FC Flawil	2–3	FC Wil
FC Stade LS Ouchy	0–4	Servette FC
FC Hägendorf	1–5	SC Cham
FC Massongex	0–5	Etoile-Carouge FC
16 September 2007
FC Bavois	1–3	BSC Young Boys
FC Léchelles	0–9	FC Basel
FC Porrentruy	0–4	FC Thun
FC Lusitanos	0–6	FC Colombier
GC Biaschesi	1–3	FC Luzern
AC Malcantone	0–4	FC Wohlen
ASC Gordola	1–5	FC Chiasso
FC Tuggen	2–2 (a.e.t.) (p. 2–4)	AC Lugano

== Round 2 ==
Super League teams cannot play each other. A team in a lower league plays at home.

Team 1	Score	Team 2
20 October 2007
SC Binningen	1–6	FC Basel
FC Baulmes	0–2 (a.e.t.)	FC Lausanne-Sport
FC Winterthur	2–3	Grasshopper Club Zürich
FC Wohlen	0–0 (a.e.t.) (p. 4–5)	AC Bellinzona
SC Kriens	1–0	FC Aarau
Etoile-Carouge FC	0–2	FC Sion
21 October 2007
FC Concordia BS	1–1 (a.e.t.) (p. 5–6)	FC Zürich
FC Colombier	1–3	Yverdon-Sport FC
FC Gossau	2–0	FC St. Gallen
FC Langenthal	2–5	FC Luzern
FC Locarno	0–2	BSC Young Boys
Racing Club GE	2–5 (a.e.t.)	Neuchâtel Xamax FC
SC Cham	0–1	FC Thun
FC Schaffhausen	3–1	FC Wil
Stade Nyonnais	2–1	Servette FC
FC Chiasso	3–1	AC Lugano

== Round 3 ==
In this round there is no seeding. Lower league teams play at home.

Team 1	Score	Team 2
24 November 2007
FC Schaffhausen	0–1	Neuchâtel Xamax
FC Lausanne-Sport	0–2	FC Gossau
FC Luzern	0–1	FC Thun
25 November 2007
AC Bellinzona	2–1	FC Sion
FC Chiasso	0–1	BSC Young Boys
Grasshopper Club Zürich	0–1	FC Basel
SC Kriens	0–3	FC Zürich
Stade Nyonnais	2–1	Yverdon-Sport FC

== Quarter-finals ==
In this round there is no seeding.

Team 1	Score	Team 2
15 December 2007
FC Thun	2–1 (a.e.t.)	FC Zürich
FC Basel	2–0	Stade Nyonnais
16 December 2007
AC Bellinzona	2–1	FC Gossau
Neuchâtel Xamax	3–2 (a.e.t.)	BSC Young Boys

== Semi-finals ==
In this round there is no seeding.

Team 1	Score	Team 2
27 February 2008
AC Bellinzona	0–0 (a.e.t.) (p. 4–2)	Neuchâtel Xamax
FC Basel	1–0	FC Thun

== Final ==
This final did not take place in the traditional location of the Stade de Suisse in Bern. The pitch was being changed at the Stade de Suisse in order to be able to ready in June for the UEFA Euro 2008. As the replacement the St. Jakob-Park in Basel was picked. Also the date of the match was moved because of Euro 2008. The Final took place on 6 April 2008.

6 April 2008
15:45

AC Bellinzona	1 – 4	FC Basel
Pouga 58'	FCB Summary	Derdiyok 30'; Majstorović 62'; Streller 64'; Huggel 66'

St. Jakob-Park, Basel
Attendance: 33,000
Referee: (Switzerland) Cyril Zimmermann (Münsingen)

GK	(Italy) Lorenzo Bucchi
DF	(Italy) Davide Belotti	(yellow card) 20'	(substituted off) 46'
DF	(Switzerland) Alessandro Mangiarratti
DF	(Italy) Paolo Carbone
MF	(Italy) Giuseppe Miccolis		(substituted off) 69'
MF	(Peru) Manuel Rivera Garrido		(substituted off) 73'
MF	(Italy) Jacopo La Rocca
MF	(Bosnia and Herzegovina) Senad Lulić
MF	(Germany) Ifet Taljević
ST	(Brazil) Neri
ST	(Cameroon) Christian Pouga
Substitutes:
DF	(Italy) Ludovico Moresi		(substituted on) 46'
MF	(Italy) Angelo Raso		(substituted on) 69'
FW	(Switzerland) Andrea Conti		(substituted on) 73'
Manager:
(Switzerland) Vladimir Petković

GK	(Argentina) Franco Costanzo
DF	(Switzerland) Reto Zanni
DF	(Sweden) Daniel Majstorović
DF	(France) François Marque
DF	(Japan) Kōji Nakata
MF	(Cameroon) Papa Malick Ba
MF	(Switzerland) Eren Derdiyok	(substituted off) 46'
MF	(Switzerland) Benjamin Huggel
MF	(Serbia) Ivan Ergić
MF	(Portugal) Carlitos	(substituted off) 55'
ST	(Brazil) Eduardo	(substituted off) 76'
Substitutes:
MF	(Switzerland) Marco Streller	(substituted on) 46'
MF	(Switzerland) David Degen	(substituted on) 55'
MF	(Serbia) Marko Perović	(substituted on) 76'
Manager:
(Switzerland) Christian Gross
