= Louis Crayton =

Liberian footballer

Personal information
- Full name: Louis Crayton
- Date of birth: 26 October 1977 (age 49)
- Place of birth: Monrovia, Liberia
- Height: 6 ft 0 in (1.83 m)
- Position: Goalkeeper

Senior career*
Years	Team	Apps	(Gls)
1995–1997	St. Joseph Warriors	33	(0)
1997–1998	Lucerne	4	(0)
1998–2000	Grasshopper	3	(0)
2000	Schaffhausen	13	(0)
2001	Wangen bei Olten	6	(0)
2001–2002	YF Juventus	15	(0)
2002–2003	Zug	13	(4)
2003–2005	Concordia Basel	44	(0)
2005–2008	Basel	12	(0)
2008–2009	D.C. United	18	(0)
2010	NSC Minnesota Stars	1	(0)
Total		162	(4)

International career
1999–2008	Liberia	36	(0)
- * Club domestic league appearances and goals

Louis Crayton (born 26 October 1977 in Monrovia) is a Liberian former footballer.

== Career ==
=== Early years ===
Crayton started his career playing for St. Joseph Warriors in Liberia before moving to his first Swiss club, Luzern in 1997. He left the club in 1998 to spend two seasons as back-up keeper at Grasshoppers Zürich until 2000 before going on to spend one half-season apiece at FC Schaffhausen, in the third tier, and FC Wangen bei Olten, in the second tier, in 2000 and 2001. He then moved to YF Juventus and spent the 2001–02 season with the club, in the third tier, before going on to spend the 2002–03 season at Zug. For Zug he was also selected to take the spot kicks, which he did on four occasions successfully. In the summer of 2003, he moved to Concordia Basel, in the second tier, and spent two seasons with the club as first-choice goalkeeper.

=== Basel ===
On 27 June 2005 it was announced that FC Basel had signed a three-year contract with Crayton as reserve goalkeeper behind first-choice keeper Pascal Zuberbühler. He joined Basel's first team during their 2005–06 season under head coach Christian Gross, who had started his seventh season with the club in that position. After playing in eight test games, Crayton played his debut for the club in a Swiss Cup away game in the Stadion Schützenmatte on 22 October 2005 as Basel won 6–1 against local amateur club Old Boys. Crayton spent the rest of his first season with Basel on the bench as a backup, because Zuberbühler played in all the other competitive matches.

To the beginning of their 2006–07 season Zuberbühler transferred out and Franco Costanzo was brought in as replacement. Until he was eligible to play, Crayton played the first two games in the 2006–07 Super League and two UEFA Cup matches. He also played one match in the UEFA Cup group stage in November 2006, due to a red-card suspension of the first-choice keeper Franco Costanzo. At the end of the 2006–07 Super League season Basel were runners-up, one point behind championship winners Zürich. In the Swiss Cup Basel advanced to the final, beating FC Liestal in the first round, Lugano, FC Baulmes, Aarau and Wil in the semi-final. In the final they played Luzern and won this 1–0 thanks to a penalty goal in the third minute of added time.

Due to a re-occurring injury to Costanzo's knee, Crayton came to a number of appearances in the new season. At the end of the 2007–08 season he won the Double with the club. They won the League Championship title with four points advantage over second placed Young Boys. In the Swiss Cup via FC Léchelles, SC Binningen, Grasshopper Club, Stade Nyonnais and in the semi-final Thun, Basel advanced to the final, and winning this 4–1 against AC Bellinzona they won the competition.

At the end of the season, it was Crayton's wish to leave the club. During his time with them, Crayton played a total of 55 games for Basel without scoring a goal. 11 of these games were in the Swiss Super League, five in the Swiss Cup, five in the UEFA Cup and 34 were friendly games.

=== D.C. United ===
On 7 August 2008, Basel announced they were allowing Crayton to move to Major League Soccer and on 15 August 2008 Crayton had signed with D.C. United. He made his first start against Chicago Fire on 16 August 2008, and secured his first MLS shutout in the process. During the 2009 season, Crayton has been caught in a three-way competition with Josh Wicks and Milos Kocic for the starting goalkeeper position for United. It appeared that Crayton would get the starting spot in goal for the 2009 season however a hip injury along with Crayton's high salary proved to much for DC which resulted in Crayton's contract being terminated.

=== Minnesota Stars ===
In the winter/spring of 2010 Crayton tried out with the Kansas City Wizards of Major League Soccer but was eventually released. On 16 March 2010 the new expansion NASL team, NSC Minnesota Stars announced that they had signed Crayton to a 1-year deal. Crayton made his debut for the team in its opening game of the 2010 season against the Vancouver Whitecaps, but suffered a serious season-ending knee injury just minutes into the game.

=== International ===
Crayton made his international debut for Liberia in a 2000 African Cup of Nations qualifying match against Tunisia. Crayton went on to represent his country 36 times, often serving as captain, before announcing his retirement from international football in May 2008.

In addition to his national team appearances, Crayton has also played in two FIFA World All-Star games, in South Africa in 1999, and in Hong Kong in 2008.

== Personal life ==
Having spent so much time playing for various clubs in Switzerland between 1997 and 2008, Crayton now also holds Swiss citizenship.

== Honors ==
Basel

- Swiss Super League: 2007–08
- Swiss Cup: 2006–07, 2007–08
- Uhren Cup: 2006

DC United

- Lamar Hunt U.S. Open Cup (1): 2008

== Sources ==
- Die ersten 125 Jahre. Publisher: Josef Zindel im Friedrich Reinhardt Verlag, Basel. ISBN 978-3-7245-2305-5
- Verein "Basler Fussballarchiv" Homepage
