= Papa Malick Ba =

Senegalese footballer (born 1980)

Personal information
- Date of birth: 11 November 1980 (age 45)
- Place of birth: Pikine, Senegal
- Height: 1.76 m (5 ft 9 in)
- Position: Defensive midfielder

Team information
- Current team: CS Sfaxien (Sporting director)

Youth career
- 1987–1994: AS Pikine
- 1995–1997: Juventus Dakar

Senior career*
Years	Team	Apps	(Gls)
1997–2005	CS Sfaxien	46	(1)
2005–2008	FC Basel	79	(2)
2009	Dinamo București	9	(0)
2009–2012	Nantes	35	(1)
2013–2016	Mulhouse	65	(3)
Total		234	(7)

International career
2006–2008	Senegal	11	(0)

Managerial career
- 2016–: CS Sfaxien (sporting director)
- * Club domestic league appearances and goals

Papa Malick Ba (born 11 November 1980) is a Senegalese former professional footballer who played as a defensive midfielder. He is contracted with CS Sfaxien as director of football. Between 2006 and 2008 he made 11 appearances for the Senegal national team.

== Career ==
=== Early years ===
Ba was born in Pikine, Senegal. He played his children's football with local club AS Pikine and between 1995 and 1997 his youth football with Juventus Dakar. When he was offered the chance to play professionally, he took it and joined the Tunisian club Club Sportif Sfaxien in 1997. He did not play any games until he was 19 and in his third season at the club. He started coming off the bench, impressing the fans after doing so. By his fourth season at the club, he was a first-team regular and was the team's main holding midfield player. He then collected some valuable titles with the Tunisians, twice the Arab Club Champions Cup in 2000 and 2004, the Tunisian League Cup in 2003, the Tunisian Cup in 2004 and the Tunisian championship in 2005.

=== Basel ===
It was reported that in 2004 numerous Swiss clubs had chased his signature, but Sfaxien turned down all offers initially. Eventually it was FC Basel and AJ Auxerre who were at loggerheads and there was a real tug of war for the services of the midfielder, who finally chose to accept a three-year contract with the reigning Swiss champions. He joined Basel's first team for their 2005–06 season under head coach Christian Gross, who started his seventh season with the club in that position. After playing in one test game, Ba played his domestic league debut for the club in the home game at the St. Jakob-Park on 30 July 2005, coming on as the substitute for the injured Murat Yakin at half time, as Basel won 2–1 against Zürich. He scored his first goal for his new club in the home game in the St. Jakob-Park on 2 October. It was the last goal of the game as Basel won 5–1 against Thun.

As Swiss champions, Basel entered the 2005–06 Champions League third qualifying round. However, they were drawn against German Bundesliga club Werder Bremen and they lost 4-2 on aggregate. Subsequently Basel dropped into the 2005–06 UEFA Cup, where against NK Široki Brijeg in the first round, they sealed a 6–0 aggregate win to qualify for the Group stage. Here Basel was then drawn into Group E, alongside Strasbourg, Roma, Red Star Belgrade and Tromsø. Basel qualified for the knock-out stage and in the round of 32 Basel was drawn against AS Monaco, this was won 2-1 on aggregate. In the round of 16 Basel was drawn against Strasbourg winning 4-2 on aggregate. In the quarter-finals, drawn against Middlesbrough they won the first leg 2–0, but Middlesbrough fought back to win the return match 4–1 and the tie 4–3 on aggregate. Ba played in all 14 European games. Basel had started the season well and were joint leaders of the championship with Zürich right until the last day of the league campaign. On the final day of the league season FCB played at home against FCZ. A last-minute goal from Zürich's Iulian Filipescu meant the final score was 1–2 in favour of the away team and it gave FCZ their first national championship since 1980–81. The title for Basel was lost on goal difference.

Ba won the Uhren Cup with Basel in 2006 in advance of the new season. FC Basel's European campaign started in the first qualifying stage of the 2006–07 UEFA Cup, here they beat Kazakhi side FC Tobol 3–1 on aggregate. In the second qualifying round they were drawn against FC Vaduz from Liechtenstein, narrowly progressing on the away goals rule after a 2–2 aggregate draw. In the first round Basel won 7–2 on aggregate against FK Rabotnički to qualify for the group stage. Here Basel played their first match at home against Feyenoord, which ended in a 1–1 draw. Their second was away and FCB lost 3–0 against Blackburn Rovers. At home against AS Nancy the match was drawn 2–2 and the final game ended with a 3–1 defeat against Wisła Kraków. Basel ended the group stage in the last position in the table and was eliminated. Ba played in nine of these ten matches, missing only the very first game due to an injury. At the end of the 2006–07 Super League season Basel was runners-up, one point behind championship winners Zürich. Ba had 33 appearances in the 36 league matches In the Swiss Cup Basel advanced to the final, beating FC Liestal in the first round, Lugano, FC Baulmes, Aarau and Wil in the semi-final. In the final they played Luzern and won 1–0 thanks to a penalty goal in the third minute of added time.

In the third match of the 2007–08 season, Ba suffered an injury and was out of the game for four months. Nevertheless, at the end of the season he won the Double with the club. They won the League Championship title with four points advantage over second placed Young Boys. In the Swiss Cup via FC Léchelles, SC Binningen, Grasshopper Club, Stade Nyonnais and in the semi-final Thun, Basel advanced to the final. But Ba missed all these games due to his injury. However, he was fit to play in the final and winning this 4–1 against AC Bellinzona they won the competition.

As his contract expired, Basel offered him an extension, up until 2010 with an option for 2011, but the Senegalese hesitated. His wife had completed an economics degree and wanted to start her working life. During his three seasons with the club, Ba played a total of 135 games for Basel scoring a total of three goals. 79 of these games were in the Swiss Super League, seven in the Swiss Cup, 26 in the UEFA competitions (Champions League and UEFA Cup) and 23 were friendly games. He scored two goals in the domestic league and the other was scored during the test games.

=== Later years ===
After being unemployed for more than six months, Ba found a new club. On 16 February 2009 it was announced that Ba had signed for FC Dinamo București of Romania on a free transfer. He played nine league and two cup games for them and then he left the club to return to France.

On 28 August 2009, he left Dinamo București to join FC Nantes. His contract with Nantes expired in June 2012

In January 2013 Ba joined FC Mulhouse, at that time in the Championnat National 2, the fourth tier of French football, as a semi-professional player.

=== International ===
He was a Senegalese international and participated in the 2008 Africa Cup of Nations.

== Honours ==
Sfaxien

- Arab Champions League: 2000, 2004
- Tunisian Cup: 2004
- Tunisian Ligue Professionnelle 1: 2005

Basel

- Swiss Super League: 2007–08
- Swiss Cup: 2006–07, 2007–08
- Uhren Cup: 2006

== Sources ==
- Die ersten 125 Jahre. Publisher: Josef Zindel im Friedrich Reinhardt Verlag, Basel. ISBN 978-3-7245-2305-5
- Verein "Basler Fussballarchiv" Homepage
