= Eduardo (footballer, born 1979) =

Brazilian footballer

Personal information
- Full name: Eduardo Adelino da Silva
- Date of birth: October 13, 1979 (age 47)
- Place of birth: Rio de Janeiro, Brazil
- Height: 1.83 m (6 ft 0 in)
- Positions: Striker; midfielder

Youth career
- 1996–1999: Bangu

Senior career*
Years	Team	Apps	(Gls)
1999–2000	Vasco da Gama	3	(0)
2000–2003	Charleroi	84	(24)
2003–2006	Toulouse	57	(8)
2005–2009	Basel	96	(17)
2010	San Jose Earthquakes	8	(0)
2011	Brasil de Farroupilha		
- * Club domestic league appearances and goals

Eduardo Adelino da Silva (born October 13, 1979), better known as simply Eduardo, is a former Brazilian footballer. He played as forward or as an attacking midfielder.

== Career ==
=== Early career ===
Eduardo started out as a youngster at his home-town club Club de Regatas Vasco da Gama in 1999. He started out in the reserves originally but soon broke into the first team because of his goalscoring ability. He made his debut at the age of 20 and made an impact. He grew stronger with every game and by the end of the season he had a respectable goal tally. His goalscoring talent had got him noticed in Europe and in 2000 he signed for Belgian Jupiler League side R. Charleroi S.C. at the age of 21. He was a substitute for the first few games of the season but when he eventually did start in the black and white shirt he impressed both the management and the fans. He kept up his good performances and stayed in the first team not just that season but for the 2001/02 and the 2002/03 too.

=== Toulouse ===
After becoming a fans' favorite in Charleroi he was spotted and snapped up by French Ligue 1 club Toulouse FC. He seemed to have left his shooting boots in Belgium however, after failing to live up to his "goalmachine" reputation. His pace and accurate passing had impressed the coach in training, though. He and the coach agreed that trying a new position may help him and he turned out as a left-winger in the next match. He played well there and kept his place in the first team. The next season did not turn out as well as first. He lost his place after a few big-money signings came to the club.

=== Basel ===
On 26 July 2005, FC Basel announced that Eduardo had signed a one-year contract coming in on a free transfer. He joined Basel's first team during their 2005–06 season under head coach Christian Gross, who started his seventh season with the club in that position. After playing in two test games Eduardo played his domestic league debut for the club in the home game in the St. Jakob-Park on 20 August, coming on in the 81st minute as Basel won 7–2 against Aarau. He scored his first goal for his new club one week later, in the home game, on 27 August as Basel won 3–0 against Xamax. As Swiss champions, Basel entered the 2005–06 Champions League third qualifying round. However, they were drawn against German Bundesliga club Werder Bremen and they lost 4-2 on aggregate. Subsequently Basel dropped into the 2005–06 UEFA Cup, where against NK Široki Brijeg in the first round, they sealed a 6–0 aggregate win to qualify for the Group stage. Here Basel were then drawn into Group E, alongside Strasbourg, Roma, Red Star Belgrade and Tromsø. Basel qualified for the knock-out stage and in the round of 32 Basel were drawn against AS Monaco, this was won 2-1 on aggregate. In the round of 16 Basel were drawn against Strasbourgh winning the first leg 2–0. In the return leg in Stade de la Meinau on 15 March 2006 Eduardo scored both goals as Basel played a 2–2 draw to win 4–2 on aggregate. In the quarter-finals, drawn against Middlesbrough they won the first leg 2–0, but Middlesbrough fought back to win the return match 4–1 and the tie 4–3 on aggregate. Eduardo played in 11 of the 12 European games. Basel had started the season well and were joint leaders of the championship with Zürich right until the last day of the league campaign. On the final day of the league season FCB played at home against FCZ. A last-minute goal from Zürich's Iulian Filipescu meant the final score was 1–2 in favour of the away team and it gave FCZ their first national championship since 1980–81. The title for Basel was lost on goal difference. During the season Basel and Eduardo signed a new, over two-years extended contract.

FC Basel's European campaign started in the first qualifying stage of the 2006–07 UEFA Cup, here they beat Kazakhi side FC Tobol 3–1 on aggregate. In the second qualifying round they were drawn against FC Vaduz from Liechtenstein, narrowly progressing on the away goals rule after a 2–2 aggregate draw. In the first round Basel won 7–2 on aggregate against FK Rabotnički to qualified for the group stage. Here Basel played their first match at home against Feyenoord, this ended in a 1–1 draw. Their second was away and FCB lost 3–0 against Blackburn Rovers. At home against AS Nancy the match was drawn 2–2 and the final game ended with a 3–1 defeat against Wisła Kraków. Basel ended the group stage in last position in the table and were eliminated. Due to an injury that he had in Autumn, Eduardo played only in four of these ten matches, scoring twice. At the end of the 2006–07 Super League season Basel were runners-up, one point behind championship winners Zürich. In the Swiss Cup Basel advanced to the final, beating FC Liestal in the first round, Lugano, FC Baulmes, Aarau and Wil in the semi-final. In the final they played Luzern and won this 1–0 thanks to a penalty goal in the third minute of added time.

Basel played in the 2007–08 UEFA Cup. Winning both matches in the qualification round and both matches in the play-off round, they team advanced to the group stage, which they ended undefeated in second position, after playing 1–0 at home against Stade Rennes, 0–0 away against Dinamo Zagreb, 1–0 at home against Brann and 1–1 away against Hamburger SV, to continue the knockout stage. But then they were eliminated here by Sporting CP. Eduardo played in all 10 of these European matches. At the end of the 2007–08 season Eduardo won the Double with the club. They won the League Championship title with four points advantage over second placed Young Boys. Eduardo had 35 appearances in the 36 league matches. In the Swiss Cup via FC Léchelles, SC Binningen, Grasshopper Club, Stade Nyonnais and in the semi-final Thun, Basel advanced to the final, and winning this 4–1 against AC Bellinzona they won the competition. Eduardo played in all six cup games.

To the beginning of the 2008–09 season he was member of the Basel team that won the Uhrencup. They beat Legia Warsaw 6–1 and played a 2–2 draw with Borussia Dortmund to end the table on top slot above Dortmund and Luzern. Eduardo injured himself in the 10th minute of the second game and he was substituted out. This injury would hamper him throughout the season. At the end of the 2008–09 Super League season Basel were third in the table, seven points behind new champions Zürich and one adrift of runners-up Young Boys. Eduardo had only 12 appearances during the league season.

On June 18, 2009, he was released by Basel after newly appointed manager Thorsten Fink decided not to offer him a new contract. During his period with the club, Eduardo played a total of 180 games for Basel scoring a total of 42 goals. 96 of these games were in the Swiss Super League, 13 in the Swiss Cup, 31 in the UEFA competitions (Champions League and UEFA Cup) and 40 were friendly games. He scored 17 goals in the domestic league, four in the cup, six in the European games and the other 15 were scored during the test games.

=== San Jose Earthquakes ===
After his release by Basel, Eduardo signed with the Major League Soccer club San Jose Earthquakes on 10 February 2010. After struggling with injury, and with getting playing time, Eduardo was released at the end of the 2010 MLS season.

=== Brasil de Farroupilha ===
In April 2011 Eduardo joined Brasil de Farroupilha and November he retired from his active football career.

== Honours ==
Vasco da Gama

- Campeonato Brasileiro Série A: 2000
- Copa Mercosur: 2000
- Taça Guanabara: 2000
- Taça Rio: 1999
- Torneio Rio-São Paulo: 1999

Toulouse

- Ligue 2: 2002-03

Basel

- Swiss Super League: 2007-08
- Swiss Cup: 2006-07, 2007-08
- Uhren Cup: 2006, 2008

== Sources ==
- Die ersten 125 Jahre. Publisher: Josef Zindel im Friedrich Reinhardt Verlag, Basel. ISBN 978-3-7245-2305-5
- Verein "Basler Fussballarchiv" Homepage
