= Baykal Kulaksızoğlu =

Swiss footballer (born 1983)

Baykal
Personal information
- Full name: Baykal Kulaksızoğlu
- Date of birth: 12 May 1983 (age 43)
- Place of birth: Istanbul, Turkey
- Height: 1.85 m (6 ft 1 in)
- Position: Midfielder

Youth career
- –1996: FC Bethlehem
- 1996–2000: SC Bümpliz 78
- 2000–2001: Grasshopper Club

Senior career*
Years	Team	Apps	(Gls)
2001–2003	Grasshopper Club	8	(0)
2003–2005	FC Thun	57	(2)
2005–2006	FC Basel	15	(0)
2006–2007	1. FC Köln	11	(0)
2008–2009	Young Boys	29	(2)
2009–2010	FC Aarau	24	(0)
2010–2011	Karşıyaka	22	(0)
2011	Lokomotiv Sofia	8	(0)
2012–2013	FC Schaffhausen	40	(6)
2013–2014	FC Tuggen	24	(8)
2014–2016	FC Linth 04	43	(5)
2016–2017	FC Muri	13	(0)

International career
2003–2006	Switzerland U-21	23	(4)
- * Club domestic league appearances and goals

Baykal Kulaksızoğlu (born 12 May 1983) is a footballer who currently plays for FC Schaffhausen. Born in Turkey, he was a youth international for Switzerland.

== Career ==
=== Early years ===
Baykal started his children's football by local club FC Bethlehem and after a few years moved on to the youth department of SC Bümpliz 78. In summer 2000 he moved to the youth department of Grasshopper Club and joined their U-21 team. One year later he advanced to their first team, where he stayed for two seasons. At the end of the 2002–03 Nationalliga A season GC won the championship and Baykal had seven appearances that season under head coach Marcel Koller. Baykal then moved to Thun in summer 2003, under head coach Hanspeter Latour he made regular appearances in their first team. They finished the 2003–04 Swiss Super League season in sixth position and one year later, under new head coach Urs Schönenberger, as runners-up.

=== Basel ===
Baykal joined FC Basel's first team for their 2005–06 season under head coach Christian Gross, who had started his seventh season with the club in that position. Basel had just won the championship for the second time in a row and Gross had to replace a number of midfielders who had left the club. After playing in six test games Baykal played his domestic league debut for the club in the home game in the St. Jakob-Park on 16 July 2005 as Basel won 1–0 against Schaffhausen. To the beginning of the season he played in the starting eleven, but soon found himself on the bench and in the second half of the season he was only used five times as joker. Basel started the season well and led the championship right until the last day of the league campaign. On the final day of the league season Basel played at home against Zürich. A last-minute goal from Zürich's Iulian Filipescu meant the final score was 1-2 in favour of the away team and it gave FCZ their first national championship since 1980–81. The title for Basel was lost on goal difference.

At the end of the season the club let Baykal move on for a moderate fee. During his time with the club, Baykal played a total of 39 games for Basel without scoring a goal. 15 of these games were in the Swiss Super League, two in the Swiss Cup, nine in the UEFA Cup and 13 were friendly games.

=== Later career ===
In June 2006, he signed with 2nd Bundesliga club 1. FC Köln. He left Cologne in January 2008 and joined Young Boys on a free transfer. He stayed with them until June 2009 and transferred to FC Aarau for one year.

In summer 2010 Baykal signed a two-year contract, dated to the end of June 2012, with Karşıyaka Spor Kulübü in Turkey. However, he left the club in May 2011 and joined PFC Lokomotiv Sofia. He was released in early January 2012. Baykal returned to Switzerland and joined semi-professional club Schaffhausen, who at that time played in the 1. Liga, the fourth tier of Swiss football. Schaffhausen won the division and were promoted to the 1. Liga Promotion and the following season they were division winners here too.

Baykal played one season for FC Tuggen, two seasons for FC Linth 04 and one season for FC Muri, before retiring from active football.

Baykal played in Switzerland's U21-National squad and featured in 2004 UEFA European Under-21 Football Championship.

== Sources ==
- Die ersten 125 Jahre. Publisher: Josef Zindel im Friedrich Reinhardt Verlag, Basel. ISBN 978-3-7245-2305-5
- Verein "Basler Fussballarchiv" Homepage
