= Bruno Berner =

Swiss footballer (born 1977)

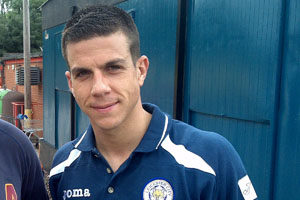
- Berner with Leicester City in 2009

Personal information
- Full name: Bruno Georg Berner
- Date of birth: 21 November 1977 (age 49)
- Place of birth: Zurich, Switzerland
- Height: 1.85 m (6 ft 1 in)
- Position: Left-back

Team information
- Current team: Xamax (manager)

Youth career
- –1992: FC Glattbrugg
- 1992–1997: Grasshoppers

Senior career*
Years	Team	Apps	(Gls)
1997–2002	Grasshoppers	72	(2)
2000	→ Real Oviedo (loan)	1	(1)
2002–2005	SC Freiburg	76	(3)
2005–2007	Basel	32	(0)
2007	→ Blackburn Rovers (loan)	1	(0)
2007–2008	Blackburn Rovers	2	(0)
2008–2012	Leicester City	84	(8)
Total		272	(13)

International career
2001–2004	Switzerland	16	(0)

Managerial career
- 2016–2017: FC Tuggen
- 2017–2021: SC Kriens
- 2021–2022: Switzerland U19
- 2022: Switzerland U20
- 2022–2023: Winterthur
- 2023–2024: Grasshoppers
- 2025–2026: Macarthur (assistant)
- 2026–: Xamax
- * Club domestic league appearances and goals

Bruno Georg Berner (born 21 November 1977) is a Swiss professional football manager and former player who is the manager of Swiss Challenge League club Xamax. He had senior management experience with Swiss Super League sides Grasshopper Club Zürich and FC Winterthur.

Throughout his playing career, Berner played predominantly as a left back, but was also deployed in other roles, such as central defence, left wing and also in central midfield towards the end of his career at Leicester City. He spent most of his career playing for Grasshopper Club Zürich, SC Freiburg, FC Basel and Leicester City.

== Club career ==
=== Grasshoppers ===
Berner started his children's football with local club FC Glattbrugg and in 1992 he moved to the youth department of Grasshopper Club Zürich continuously advancing through the ranks. In the 1997–98 Nationalliga A season, he advanced from their U-21 team to their first team under head coach Rolf Fringer and they won the Swiss championship. In January 2000, Berner was loaned out to Real Oviedo, but he returned four months later. He won the championship a second time with GC at the end of the 2000–01 season. Berner had 28 appearances, scoring one goal. In the 2001–02 season GC were runners-up.

=== SC Freiburg ===
In 2002 Berner went to Germany, transferred to SC Freiburg in the 2. Bundesliga. At the end of the 2002–03 season Berner and Freiburg were division champions and secured promotion. Freiburg finished the 2003–04 Bundesliga season in 13th position, but after the 2004–05 Bundesliga season, the team was in last position and suffered relegation.

=== FC Basel ===
On 23 June 2005, it was announced that Berner had joined FC Basel from SC Freiburg. He joined Basel's first team during their 2005–06 season under head coach Christian Gross, who started his seventh season with the club in that position. The two knew each other from Berner's early days by GC. After playing in seven test games, Berner played his domestic league debut for the club in the away game in the Stade Municipal on 6 August as Basel won 2–1 against Yverdon-Sport. Berner was injured in this game, he was substituted out in the 20th minute and could not play again until November. Berner had more appearances in the second half of the season, but never made it to becoming a regular starter. Basel had started the season well and were joint leaders of the championship with Zürich right until the last day of the league campaign. On the final day of the league season FCB played at home against FCZ. A last-minute goal from Zürich's Iulian Filipescu meant the final score was 1–2 in favour of the away team and it gave FCZ their first national championship since 1980–81. The title for Basel was lost on goal difference.

FC Basel's European campaign started in the first qualifying stage of the 2006–07 UEFA Cup, here they beat Kazakhi side FC Tobol 3–1 on aggregate. In the second qualifying round they were drawn against FC Vaduz from Liechtenstein, narrowly progressing on the away goals rule after a 2–2 aggregate draw. In the first round Basel won 7–2 on aggregate against FK Rabotnički to qualified for the group stage. Here Basel played their first match at home against Feyenoord, this ended in a 1–1 draw. Their second was away and FCB lost 3–0 against Blackburn Rovers. At home against AS Nancy the match was drawn 2–2 and the final game ended with a 3–1 defeat against Wisła Kraków. Basel ended the group stage in last position in the table and were eliminated. Berner played in six of these ten matches.

Berner had 15 appearances in the 18 league matches in the first half of the season, but only eight in the starting eleven. He decided to leave the club. During his short period with the club, Berner played a total of 16 games for Basel scoring two goals. 32 of these games were in the Swiss Super League, two in the Swiss Cup, 12 in the UEFA Cup and 23 were friendly games. Both his goals were scored during the test games.

=== Blackburn Rovers ===
Berner moved to Blackburn Rovers for a nominal fee from FC Basel on 30 January 2007. He was given the squad number 25. On 10 February 2007, he played his first Premiership match for Blackburn, in a 1–0 defeat to Everton. He made his second start against Manchester City on 27 December 2007. He was released from his contract on 19 May 2008, along with fellow Switzerland defender Stéphane Henchoz. On 3 July 2008, Berner joined Norwich City on trial, joining up with the squad for pre-season training, however he failed to gain a contract.

=== Leicester City ===
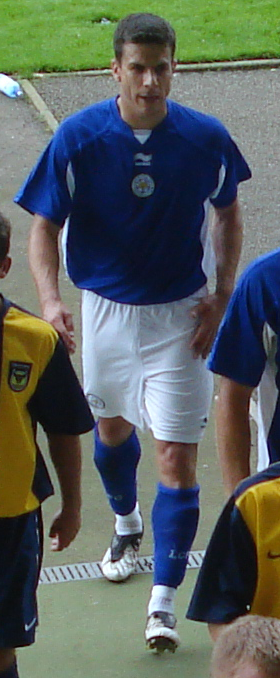
Berner playing against Oxford United in a pre-season friendly, 24 July 2010

On 12 September 2008, Berner joined Leicester City on a three-year contract and was issued the number 31 shirt. The club had beaten the likes of Aston Villa and Nottingham Forest for his signature. He made his debut in a Football League Trophy match against Lincoln City at the Walkers Stadium on 23 September, drawing 0–0 but winning 3–1 on penalties. He scored a league goal in a 4–2 win over Huddersfield Town on 24 January 2009, his first in four years. He made a total of 32 league appearances, scoring 3 goals to help Leicester secure their promotion as League One champions.

Berner was issued the number 15 shirt for the 2009–10 season, with an aim to reach the Championship play-offs. After Leicester reached sixth in the table by 12 September, it came as no surprise to Berner, who insisted their promising start to the season is no more than they expected. He scored his first goal of the season in a 2–1 defeat to Preston North End on 26 September. When Berner was absent with injury in December, the club failed to keep a clean sheet for seven matches. It was not until he returned to the first team that Leicester finally kept a clean sheet in a 0–0 draw against Newcastle United on 30 January 2010. He scored a goal and assisted another in a 3–0 win over Nottingham Forest on 27 February 2010, helping the club finish the month undefeated. Berner scored a penalty kick in a 4–3 defeat on penalties to Cardiff City in the Championship play-offs semi-final second leg on 12 May 2010.

In the 2010–11 season, Berner revealed with reluctance the likelihood he would leave the club in the January transfer window due to lack of regular football, having lost his place to loanee Greg Cunningham. He made his first start since October 2010 against Swansea City on 3 January 2011, scoring in a 2–1 win. Cunningham's loan soon ended due to injury and despite Berner being offered a new contract, he still maintained the possibility of leaving, having received interest from "a few Championship clubs". He finally signed the one-year contract on 20 January.

However, Berner announced his retirement from professional football on 1 March 2012 after failing to make an appearance for the Foxes in the 2011–12 season.

== International career ==
Berner made his international debut for Switzerland in a 2–1 win over Austria on 15 August 2001. He was a participant in the 2004 UEFA European Championship, but was an unused substitute in all three Group B matches. Despite being hopeful of winning his place back in the national team for the 2010 FIFA World Cup, Berner was not among the 23 players selected on 11 May 2010.

== Managerial career ==
Between November 2016 and June 2017, Berner was the first team manager of Swiss club FC Tuggen.

In June 2017, Berner left FC Tuggen to take up the role of first team manager at Swiss Challenge League club SC Kriens.

In the 2021–22 season, he coached the U-19 and U-20 teams of the Swiss national team.

On 30 May 2022, he was confirmed as the head coach of newly promoted FC Winterthur, replacing Alex Frei.

On 9 June 2023, he was appointed as the new head coach of his childhood club Grasshopper Club Zürich, for the next two year. At the time of his departure from Winterthur, he still had one year left on his contract, but neither club made the details of this appointment public. Following a poor run of form following the winter break in 2024, he was finally dismissed from his position on 9 April 2024. In his final 13 games, all played in 2024, Grasshoppers only managed two wins and three draws. As a result, the team slipped from eight to eleventh place in the league, which puts them on the relegation playoff spot.

On 23 June 2025, he joined Macarthur FC as assistant to head coach Mile Sterjovski. Berner and Sterjovski had previously played together at FC Basel.

On 28 April 2026, he was announced as the new head coach of Swiss Challenge League side Neuchâtel Xamax for the upcoming season. He will take up his duties starting on 1 June 2026.

== Honours ==
Grasshoppers

- Nationalliga A: 1997–98, 2000–01

SC Freiburg

- 2. Bundesliga: 2002–03

Leicester City

- Football League One: 2008–09

== Sources ==
- Die ersten 125 Jahre. Publisher: Josef Zindel im Friedrich Reinhardt Verlag, Basel. ISBN 978-3-7245-2305-5
- Verein "Basler Fussballarchiv" Homepage
