= Daniel Majstorović =

Swedish footballer (born 1977)

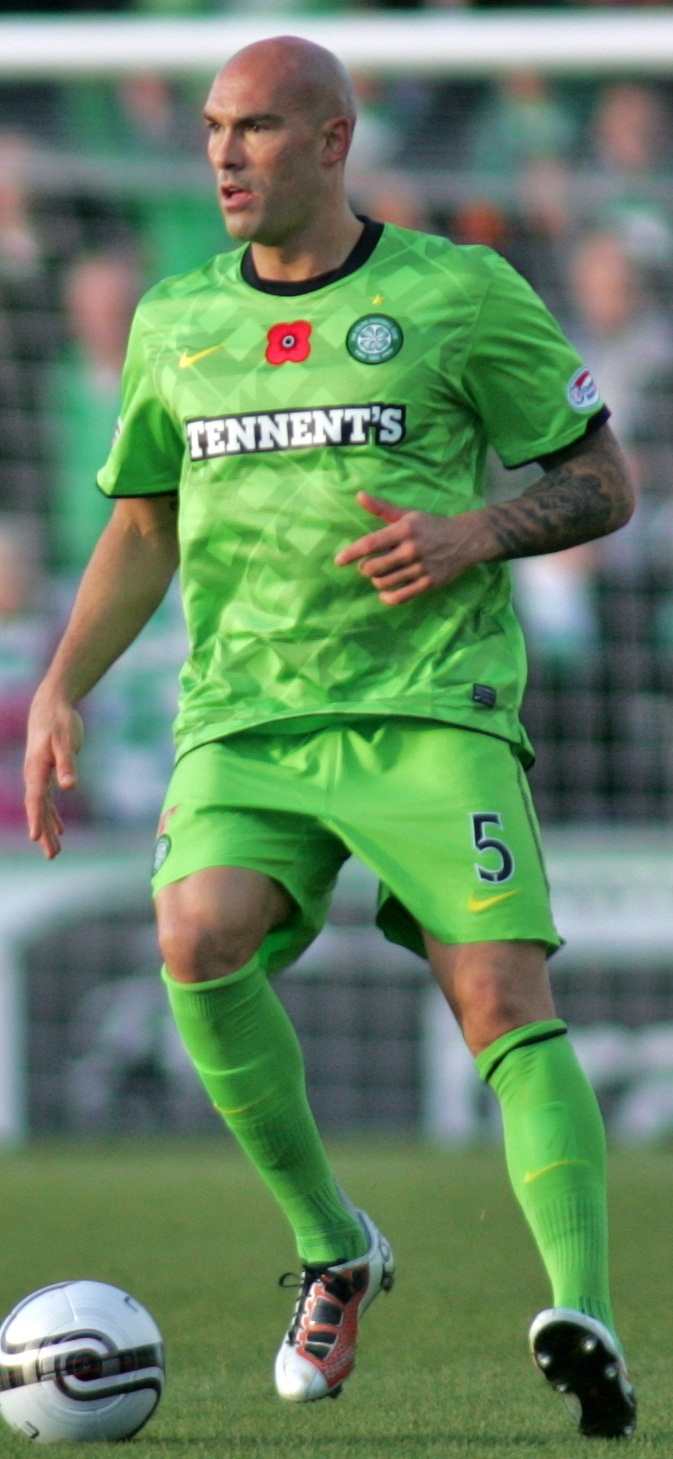
- Majstorović playing for Celtic

Personal information
- Full name: Daniel Majstorović
- Date of birth: 5 April 1977 (age 49)
- Place of birth: Stockholm, Sweden
- Height: 1.90 m (6 ft 3 in)
- Position: Centre back

Youth career
- Övergrans IF

Senior career*
Years	Team	Apps	(Gls)
1996–1997	IF Brommapojkarna	34	(1)
1997–1998	Fortuna Köln	24	(2)
1998–2000	Västerås SK	44	(9)
2001–2004	Malmö FF	86	(9)
2004–2006	Twente	49	(4)
2006–2008	Basel	86	(23)
2008–2010	AEK Athens	56	(4)
2010–2012	Celtic	49	(1)
2012–2013	AIK	12	(1)
Total		433	(53)

International career
1997	Sweden U21	1	(0)
2003–2013	Sweden	50	(2)

Managerial career
- 2016–2017: AEK Athens (technical director)
- 2017–2018: IF Brommapojkarna (sporting director)
- * Club domestic league appearances and goals

Daniel Majstorović (born 5 April 1977) is a Swedish former professional footballer who played as a centre back.

He started his career with IF Brommapojkarna in his native Sweden. After a year with the club, he moved to German side SC Fortuna Köln in 1997, subsequently moving back to Sweden just a year later when he signed for Västerås SK. His form then earned him a move to Malmö FF, where he won his first trophy, the 2004 Allsvenskan, and his first international call-up for the Sweden national team in 2003.

In 2004, he moved to Dutch Eredivisie club FC Twente for a fee of €800,000, and after one season he signed for Swiss Super League side FC Basel for €1.3 million. He won the double of league and cup in the 2007–08 season. He scored 11 goals in the double-winning season, and finished as the club's second top goalscorer. In 2008, then he moved to Super League Greece side AEK Athens on a free transfer. He was released in 2010 due to financial problems at the club and was then signed by Scottish Premier League team Celtic. In Scotland, he won the 2010–11 Scottish Cup and 2011–12 Scottish Premier League.

A full international between 2003 and 2013, he won 50 caps and scored two goals for the Sweden national team and represented his country at UEFA Euro 2008.

== Club career ==
=== Early career ===
Before starting his football career, Majstorović played at the youth level at Övergrans IF and Håbo FF. He began his professional career with IF Brommapojkarna in 1995, playing 20 games in his debut season. The next year, he only played 14 games and scored once but was still spotted German side Fortuna Köln, who secured his signature in 1997. On 15 February 1998, Majstorović made his debut for the club in a 2–2 draw against KFC Uerdingen 05. Since making his debut, Majstorović was a first-team regular, scoring his first goal for the club on 14 March 1998 in a 1–1 draw against FC St. Pauli, his only goal in German professional football.

=== Västerås SK ===
Majstorović did not play many more games in Germany, where in his second year he made just seven, scoring one goal. He then returned to Sweden the following year, signing with Västerås SK. The club was in the pre-season from the Allsvenskan gone and missed with a third party as a table Majstorović just the direct re-emergence. The following year was only a midfield place after all of the qualifications for the new single-track second division meant. He became a fans' favourite at Västerås and was watched by scouts from the Sweden national team and Malmö FF.

=== Malmö FF ===
Majstorović's good performances for Västerås earned him a move to Swedish club Malmö FF—just promoted to Allsvenskan—where he rose to become a cult hero. There were also economic reasons behind Majstorović's transfer to the club—Västerås were in deep economic trouble and in risk of relegation. Malmö FF would lose six points in the league if this happened and thus made a bid to save the club and purchase a quality player simultaneously. At the club, the emergence of young talent Zlatan Ibrahimović led to the return to Allsvenskan in 2001.

With the club, Majstorović could lay down in front of the table with 18 games of the season and he carried in his 2004 season with the championship title for the first time in 15 years. That same year he was elected by the opponents in the league at the worst possible opponent. Majstorović spent four years at Malmö, playing 86 games and scoring nine goals. He then sought a bigger challenge and a better league to play in so he could earn more international caps.

=== Twente ===
Majstorović moved to Dutch club FC Twente in 2004 for €800,000, with whom he played 50 games, accompanied by four goals. His most notable moment with the club was when they won the UEFA Intertoto Cup 2006. Although he played well at Twente, his time there was shrouded in controversy — in March 2005, he was cleared of a seven-game Eredivisie ban for allegedly elbowing FC Groningen forward Martin Drent and in December of the same year he was involved in a training ground confrontation with team-mate Blaise Nkufo. A week later, Majstorović later came too late for training and he was released because of this lack of discipline by the club.

=== Basel ===
In January 2006, Majstorović signed for reigning Swiss champions FC Basel for a reported €3.3 million, despite interest from Ajax, PSV, and Newcastle United. He joined Basel's first team during their 2005–06 season under head coach Christian Gross. After playing in two test games Majstorović played his domestic league debut for his new club in the away game in the Hardturm on 12 February 2006 as Basel played a 1–1 draw with Zürich. He scored his first league goal for his new team one week later on 19 February in the home game in the St. Jakob-Park as Basel drew 1–1 with Schaffhausen.

During the autumn, Basel had qualified themselves for the knock-out stage of the 2005–06 UEFA Cup. In the round of 32 Basel were drawn against Monaco, Basel won the first leg 1-0 and in the second leg Majstorović scored the equaliser in the 1–1 draw. In the round of 16 Basel advanced to the quarter-finals beating Strasbourg 4–2 on aggregate. In the quarter-final Basel won the first leg 2–0 against Middlesbrough. Majstorović was sent off during the second leg at the Riverside Stadium while Basel were leading still leading on the away goals rule. Middlesbrough went on to win the match 4–1 with a last minute goal, therefore the tie 4–3 on aggregate, and many of the Basel supporters held Majstorović partly responsible.

Basel had started well into the 2005–06 Super League season and led the championship right until the last day of the league campaign. On the closing day of the league season, Basel played a finalissima at home against Zürich. Mladen Petrić had scored the equaliser for FCB after FCZ had taken an early lead. But then a 93rd-minute goal from Zürich's Iulian Filipescu meant the final score was 1–2 in favour of the away team and it gave FCZ their first national championship since 1980–81. The title for Basel was lost on goal difference. Majstorović had played in all 18 league games since he joined the club, scoring five league goals. The last-minute loss of the Championship and the subsequent riots, the so-called Basel Hooligan Incident, meant that the club would suffer consequences.

FC Basel's European campaign started in the first qualifying stage of the 2006–07 UEFA Cup, here they beat Kazakhi side FC Tobol 3–1 on aggregate. In the second qualifying round they were drawn against FC Vaduz from Liechtenstein, narrowly progressing on the away goals rule after a 2–2 aggregate draw. In the first round Basel won 7–2 on aggregate against FK Rabotnički to qualified for the group stage. Here Basel played their first match at home against Feyenoord, this ended in a 1–1 draw. Their second was away and FCB lost 3–0 against Blackburn Rovers. At home against AS Nancy the match was drawn 2–2 and the final game ended with a 3–1 defeat against Wisła Kraków. Basel ended the group stage in last position in the table and were eliminated. Majstorović played in nine of these ten matches, scoring twice. At the end of the 2006–07 Super League season Basel were runners-up, one point behind championship winners Zürich. Majstorović played in 35 of these 36 matches, scoring eight times. In the 2006–07 Swiss Cup Basel advanced to the final, beating FC Liestal in the first round, Lugano, FC Baulmes, Aarau and Wil in the semi-final. In the final they played Luzern and won this 1–0 thanks to a penalty goal, scored by Majstorović, in the third minute of added time. Majstorović had played in all six of these games.

Basel played in the 2007–08 UEFA Cup. Winning both matches in the qualification round and both matches in the play-off round, they team advanced to the group stage, which they ended undefeated in second position, after playing 1–0 at home against Stade Rennes, 0–0 away against Dinamo Zagreb, 1–0 at home against Brann and 1–1 away against Hamburger SV, to continue the knockout stage. But then they were eliminated here by Sporting CP. Majstorović played in all ten of these games. At the end of their 2007–08 season he won the Double with the club. They won the League Championship title with four points advantage over second placed Young Boys. In the Swiss Cup via FC Léchelles, SC Binningen, Grasshopper Club, Stade Nyonnais and in the semi-final Thun, Basel advanced to the final this season as well, and winning this 4–1 against AC Bellinzona they won the competition.

Majstorović was also vice-captain and led the team out whenever Ivan Ergić was not playing. Majstorović had an excellent scoring record at Basel. He regularly lingered in the opposition's penalty area when attacking corners and due to his great heading ability, he often converted high balls into the back of the net. He was also a spot-kick specialist. At the end of the 2007–08 season, he was Basel's second top goal-scorer with 10 goals, behind 12-goal Marco Streller. The explanation for his many goals is because during his time with Basel, Majstorović was the club's first choice penalty taker. On 19 May 2008 the UEFA announced that AEK Athens had signed the Swedish international Majstorović from FC Basel 1893 and that the central defender had signed on a three-year contract.

During his time with the club, Majstorović had played a total of 142 games for Basel scoring a total of 32 goals. 85 of these games were in the Swiss Super League, 10 in the Swiss Cup, 25 in the UEFA Cup and 22 were friendly games. He scored 23 goals in the domestic league, four in the cup, three in the European games and the other two were scored during the test games.

=== AEK Athens ===
On 19 May 2008, Majstorović signed a three-year contract with Greek club AEK Athens, having turned down an offer from Lazio. He played his first competitive match for AEK on 14 August 2008, in a 1–0 defeat to Cypriot side AC Omonia at the Olympic Stadium in a UEFA Cup qualifying match. Majstorović's first goal for AEK was against Asteras Tripolis. He scored again against Asteras Tripolis giving the win to his team on 22 February 2009. He co-operated in the defence with the Greek international defender Sotiris Kyrgiakos, and Geraldo Alves. Majstorović scored his third goal for AEK in the Greek Cup semi-finals against Panserraikos on 18 March 2009. Majstorović scored the winning goal against Benfica in the Europa League on 1 October 2009.

=== Celtic ===
On 16 August 2010, Majstorović signed a two-year deal with Scottish Premier League club Celtic on a free transfer. Majstorović made his Celtic debut in the Europa League match against Dutch side FC Utrecht on 19 August 2010 in a 2–0 victory and his SPL debut three days later in a 4–0 win at home against St Mirren. Majstorović captained the side to a 2–1 victory over Kilmarnock when captain Scott Brown went off injured, captained the side again three days later against Inverness Caledonian Thistle in a League Cup tie which ended in a 6–0 win for Celtic. Majstorović scored his first goal for Celtic on 9 January 2011 in a 2–0 Scottish Cup win against Third Division side Berwick Rangers. He scored his first league goal for Celtic in a 3–1 win over Dundee United on 13 February 2011 at Tannadice. Majstorović played the full 90 minutes, picking up a yellow card, as Celtic won 3–0 against Motherwell in the 2011 Scottish Cup Final.

On 18 December 2011, Majstorović suffered a fractured cheekbone after a collision with St Johnstone midfielder David Robertson. After nearly eight weeks out injured, he returned to the first team on 8 February 2012, playing 27 minutes in a 4–0 win over Hearts. On 28 February 2012, Majstorović was ruled out for the remainder of the Scottish Premier League, due to rupturing his cruciate ligament after colliding with Zlatan Ibrahimović and Anders Svensson in training. The injury threw Majstorović's Celtic career into jeopardy as his contract is set to run out at the end of the 2011–12 campaign.

After a lot of speculation he decided not to extend his contract with the Glasgow club.

=== AIK ===
On 15 May 2012, it was confirmed that Majstorović was leaving Celtic to join Allsvenskan outfit AIK in August 2012, signing a 2 1/2-year deal at the Swedish club. He parted ways with them on mutual consent, 6 January 2014.

On 4 February 2014, Majstorovic announced his retirement as a player and stated that he intended to become an agent.

== International career ==
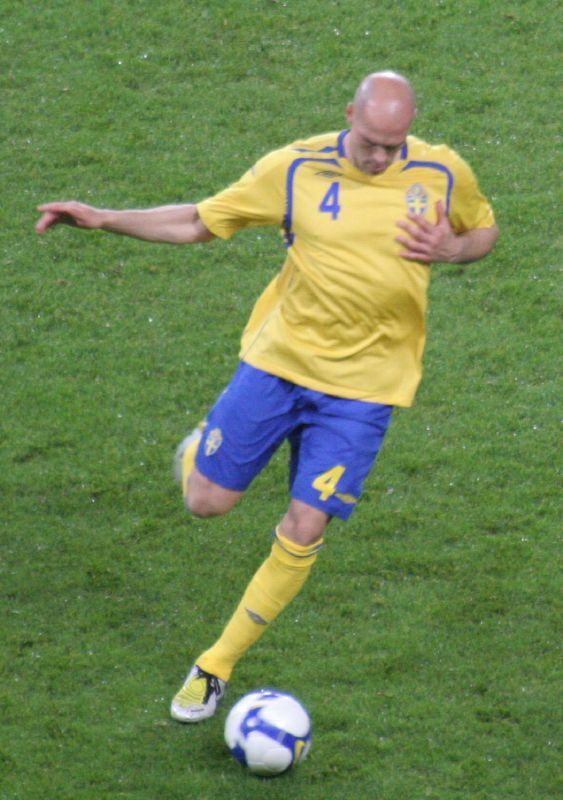
Majstorović playing for Sweden

Majstorović was selected for the Sweden squad after turning in good performances for Malmö in the UEFA Cup and Swedish Allsvenskan. He made his international debut in the 3–2 King's Cup win against Qatar and scored in his second match against Thailand in a 4–1 victory. Majstorović was on stand-by for Euro 2004 in Portugal and the 2006 World Cup in Germany.

He made substitute appearances against Iceland in Reykjavík and Northern Ireland in Belfast during the Euro 2008 qualifiers, as well as starting against Liechtenstein in Vaduz and Latvia in Solna. Majstorović was finally called into the squad for a major tournament, taking part at Euro 2008 in Austria and Switzerland. Sweden failed to qualify for the 2010 FIFA World Cup, but qualified as best runner-up for UEFA Euro 2012. In scoring an own goal against England in November 2011, he became the goalscorer of the 2000th goal in England's history. While preparing for a friendly match against Croatia in Zagreb on 28 February 2012, Majstorović ruptured a cruciate ligament, which prevented him from playing in Euro 2012.

== Personal life ==
Majstorović is a father of three; he has a son, Antonio, and two daughters, Danielle and Celine. He has appeared in Swedish sport documentaries Malmö FF – Allsvenskan 2004 and Vägen tillbaka – Blådårar 2. He speaks seven different languages: Serbian, Danish, Dutch, English, Norwegian, German, Greek and his native Swedish. He is of Serb descent.

== Career statistics ==
=== Club ===
As of 8 November 2012

Appearances and goals by club, season and competition
Club	Season	League			National Cup		League Cup		Europe		Total	
Club	Season	Division	Apps	Goals	Apps	Goals	Apps	Goals	Apps	Goals	Apps	Goals
Brommapojkarna	1996	Division 1 Norra	20	0	–	–	–	–	–	–	20	0
Brommapojkarna	1997	Division 1 Norra	14	1	–	–	–	–	–	–	14	1
Brommapojkarna	Total		34	1	–	–	–	–	–	–	34	1
Fortuna Köln	1997–98	2. Bundesliga	17	1	4	1	–	–	–	–	21	2
Fortuna Köln	1998–99	2. Bundesliga	7	1	–	–	–	–	–	–	7	1
Fortuna Köln	Total		24	2	4	1	–	–	–	–	28	2
Västerås	1999	Division 1 Norra	19	4	–	–	–	–	–	–	19	4
Västerås	2000	Superettan	25	5	–	–	–	–	–	–	25	5
Västerås	Total		44	9	–	–	–	–	–	–	44	9
Malmö	2001	Allsvenskan	23	3	–	–	–	–	–	–	23	3
Malmö	2002	Allsvenskan	24	4	–	–	–	–	–	–	24	4
Malmö	2003	Allsvenskan	21	0	–	–	–	–	2	0	23	0
Malmö	2004	Allsvenskan	18	2	–	–	–	–	–	–	18	2
Malmö	Total		86	9	–	–	–	–	2	0	88	9
FC Twente	2004–05	Eredivisie	30	2	3	0	–	–	–	–	33	2
FC Twente	2005–06	Eredivisie	19	2	2	0	–	–	0	0	21	2
FC Twente	Total		49	4	5	0	–	–	0	0	54	4
Basel	2005–06	Swiss Super League	18	5	–	–	–	–	6	1	24	6
Basel	2006–07	Swiss Super League	35	8	–	–	–	–	6	1	41	9
Basel	2007–08	Swiss Super League	32	10	4	2	–	–	6	0	42	12
Basel	Total		85	23	4	2	–	–	18	2	107	27
AEK Athens	2008–09	Super League Greece	34	2	6	1	–	–	2	0	42	3
AEK Athens	2009–10	Super League Greece	33	2	1	1	–	–	6	1	40	4
AEK Athens	Total		67	4	7	2	–	–	8	1	82	7
Celtic	2010–11	Scottish Premier League	32	1	5	1	2	0	1	0	40	2
Celtic	2011–12	Scottish Premier League	17	0	0	0	2	0	6	0	25	0
Celtic	Total		49	1	5	1	4	0	7	0	65	2
AIK	2012	Allsvenskan	4	0	1	0	-	-	2	0	7	0
AIK	2013	Allsvenskan	8	1	0	0	-	-	0	0	8	1
AIK	Total		12	1	1	0	-	-	2	0	15	1
Career total			450	54	26	6	4	0	37	3	517	62

=== International ===
Appearances and goals by national team and year
National team	Year	Apps	Goals
Sweden	2003	3	1
Sweden	2004	0	0
Sweden	2005	2	0
Sweden	2006	2	0
Sweden	2007	5	0
Sweden	2008	8	0
Sweden	2009	11	1
Sweden	2010	8	0
Sweden	2011	9	0
Sweden	2012	0	0
Sweden	2013	2	0
Total		50	2

Scores and results list Sweden's goal tally first, score column indicates score after each Majstorović goal.

List of international goals scored by Daniel Majstorović
#	Date	Venue	Opponent	Score	Result	Competition
1.	20 February 2003	Suphachalasai Stadium, Bangkok, Thailand	Thailand	4–0	4–1	2003 King's Cup
2.	10 June 2009	Ullevi, Gothenburg, Sweden	Malta	2–0	4–0	2010 FIFA World Cup qualifier

== Honours ==
Malmö

- Allsvenskan: 2004

Basel

- Swiss Championship: 2007–08
- Swiss Cup: 2006–07, 2007–08

Celtic

- Scottish Cup: 2011
- Scottish Premier League: 2011–12

Sweden

- King's Cup: 2003

Individual

- Swedish Goal of the Year: 2002

== Sources ==
- Josef Zindel (2018). FC Basel 1893. Die ersten 125 Jahre (in German). Basel: Friedrich Reinhardt Verlag. ISBN 978-3-7245-2305-5.
