= 2003–04 Arab Champions League =

دوري أبطال العرب 2003–04

Tournament details
- Dates: 24 October 2003 – 27 June 2004
- Teams: 32 (from 1 association)

Final positions
- Champions: (Tunisia) CS Sfaxien (2nd title)
- Runners-up: (Egypt) El-Ismaily
- Third place: (Egypt) Zamalek SC
- Fourth place: (Saudi Arabia) Al-Hilal

Tournament statistics
- Matches played: 104
- Goals scored: 277 (2.66 per match)
- Top scorer: (Senegal) Tanem N'Daye (8 goals)

The 2003–04 Arab Champions League is the first edition of a new format called Arab Champions League replacing the former Arab Unified Club Championship. The teams represented Arab nations from Africa and Asia. CS Sfaxien of Tunisia won the final against El-Ismaily of Egypt.

== First round ==
Qatar and UA Emirates forfeited for undisclosed reasons. Dahak Club (Djibouti) were originally announced as participants but apparently not included in the draw.

=== Zone Asia ===
Team 1	Agg.	Team 2	1st leg	2nd leg
Al-Jaish (Syria)	3–3 (a)	(Saudi Arabia) Al-Hilal	2–2	1–1
Al-Aqsa SC (Palestine)	3–4	(Iraq) Al-Zawra'a	1–3	2–1
Olympic Beirut (Lebanon)	2–2 (a)	(Jordan) Al-Wehdat	1–2	1–0
Al-Qadsia (Kuwait)	1–3	(Saudi Arabia) Al-Ahli Jeddah	1–2	0–1
Riffa SC (Bahrain)	4–4 (a)	Kuwait SC	4–2	0–2
Al-Nasr (Oman)	3–4	(Jordan) Al-Faisaly	2–0	1–4
Al-Ittihad Aleppo (Syria)	0–2	(Saudi Arabia) Al-Ittihad Jeddah	0–0	0–2
Shaab Ibb (Yemen)	2–5	(Iraq) Al-Talaba	1–1	1–4

=== Zone Africa ===
Team 1	Agg.	Team 2	1st leg	2nd leg
CS Sfaxien (Tunisia)	5–3	(Libya) Al-Hilal Benghazi	3–1	2–2
FC Nouadhibou (Mauritania)	2–7	(Egypt) Zamalek SC	1–2	1–5
Al-Hilal Club (Sudan)	3–7	(Tunisia) Espérance de Tunis	3–1	0–6
MAS Fez (Morocco)	2–3	(Algeria) USM Blida	1–3	1–0
Al-Ittihad Tripoli (Libya)	2–5	(Tunisia) Étoile du Sahel	1–5	1–0
MC Oran (Algeria)	3–7	(Egypt) El-Ismaily	1–1	2–6
Hassania Agadir (Morocco)	0–3	(Egypt) Al Ahly	0–0	0–3
Al-Merrikh (Sudan)	1–5	(Algeria) NA Hussein Dey	0–2	1–3

== Second round ==
=== Group A ===
Team	Pld	W	D	L	GF	GA	GD	Pts	HIL	AHL	ZSC	WEH
(Saudi Arabia) Al-Hilal	6	4	2	0	10	1	+9	14		3–0	3–0	2–0
(Saudi Arabia) Al-Ahli Jeddah	6	3	2	1	9	8	+1	11	1–1		2–2	2–1
(Iraq) Al-Zawra'a	6	1	3	2	8	10	−2	6	0–0	1–3		3–0
(Jordan) Al-Wehdat	6	0	1	5	3	11	−8	1	0–1	0–1	2–2	

Legend: Blue = home team win; Yellow = draw; Red = away team win.

=== Group B ===
Team	Pld	W	D	L	GF	GA	GD	Pts	ITT	TSC	KSC	FAI
(Saudi Arabia) Al-Ittihad Jeddah	6	3	3	0	6	1	+5	12		0–0	3–1	3–0
(Iraq) Al-Talaba	6	3	3	0	8	4	+4	12	0–0		2–1	2–0
Kuwait SC	6	2	1	3	10	9	+1	7	0–1	2–2		5–1
(Jordan) Al-Faisaly	6	0	1	5	2	13	−11	1	0–0	1–2	0–1	

Legend: Blue = home team win; Yellow = draw; Red = away team win.

=== Group C ===
Team	Pld	W	D	L	GF	GA	GD	Pts	ZSC	CSS	EST	USMB
(Egypt) Zamalek SC	6	4	1	1	11	5	+6	13		0–2	3–0	1–1
(Tunisia) CS Sfaxien	6	3	1	2	9	7	+2	10	1–3		0–1	1–0
(Tunisia) Espérance de Tunis	6	3	0	3	10	9	+1	9	1–2	1–3		2–1
(Algeria) USM Blida	6	0	2	4	4	13	−9	2	0–2	2–2	0–5	

Legend: Blue = home team win; Yellow = draw; Red = away team win.

=== Group D ===
Team	Pld	W	D	L	GF	GA	GD	Pts	ISC	AHL	ESS	NAHD
(Egypt) Al-Ismaily	6	2	3	1	8	4	+4	9		4–0	2–2	1–0
(Egypt) Al Ahly	6	2	3	1	3	5	−2	9	1–0		0–0	1–1
(Tunisia) Étoile du Sahel	6	1	4	1	5	4	+1	7	1–1	0–0		2–0
(Algeria) NA Hussein Dey	6	1	2	3	2	5	−3	5	0–0	0–1	1–0	

Legend: Blue = home team win; Yellow = draw; Red = away team win.

== Group stage ==
=== Group 1 ===
Team	Pld	W	D	L	GF	GA	GD	Pts	CSS	ISC	AHL	ITT
(Tunisia) CS Sfaxien	6	3	3	0	12	4	+8	12		4–0	1–1	2–1
(Egypt) Al-Ismaily	6	2	2	2	7	12	−5	8	0–3		1–0	1–0
(Saudi Arabia) Al-Ahli Jeddah	6	1	4	1	9	9	0	7	1–1	3–3		1–1
(Saudi Arabia) Al-Ittihad Jeddah	6	0	3	3	7	10	−3	3	1–1	2–2	2–3	

Legend: Blue = home team win; Yellow = draw; Red = away team win.

=== Group 2 ===
Team	Pld	W	D	L	GF	GA	GD	Pts	HIL	ZSC	TSC	AHL
(Saudi Arabia) Al-Hilal	4	2	1	1	5	4	+1	7		2–0	1–0	
(Egypt) Zamalek SC	4	2	1	1	5	4	+1	7	1–1		2–0	
(Iraq) Al-Talaba	4	1	0	3	4	6	−2	3	3–1	1–2		
(Egypt) Al Ahly	0	0	0	0	0	0	0	0	0–0			

Legend: Blue = home team win; Yellow = draw; Red = away team win.

Al Ahly withdrew after the first match of the group against Al-Hilal, the result of this match was not counted.

== Knock-out stage ==
Knock-out stage held in Beirut, Lebanon.

Semifinals
(Egypt) Zamalek SC	0	1	1
(Tunisia) CS Sfaxien	2	2	4
(Saudi Arabia) Al-Hilal	0	2	2
(Egypt) El-Ismaily	2	1	3

Finals
(Tunisia) CS Sfaxien (p)	0 (4)
(Egypt) El-Ismaily	0 (3)
Third place
(Egypt) Zamalek SC	3
(Saudi Arabia) Al-Hilal	2

=== Semifinals ===
23 June 2004

Zamalek SC (Egypt)	0–2	(Tunisia) CS Sfaxien
		Ba 18'; N'Daye 85'

Camille Chamoun Stadium, Beirut
23 June 2004

Al-Hilal (Saudi Arabia)	0–2	(Egypt) El-Ismaily
		Gamal 53'; Al-Dossari 64' (o.g.)

Camille Chamoun Stadium, Beirut

25 June 2004

CS Sfaxien (Tunisia)	2–1	(Egypt) Zamalek SC
Ba 85'; N'Daye 90+17'		Ali 35'

Camille Chamoun Stadium, Beirut
25 June 2004

El-Ismaily (Egypt)	1–2	(Saudi Arabia) Al-Hilal
Gamal 29'		Ceesay 67'; Al-Ali 90+1'

Camille Chamoun Stadium, Beirut

=== Third place match ===
27 June 2004

Zamalek SC (Egypt)	3–2	(Saudi Arabia) Al-Hilal
Saleh 6'; El-Tabei 26'; Seddek 83'		Al-Shalhoub 15'; Al-Swaileh 40'

Camille Chamoun Stadium, Beirut

=== Final ===
27 June 2004

CS Sfaxien (Tunisia)	0–0 (a.e.t.)	(Egypt) El-Ismaily
Penalties
N'Daye (penalty scored) – (penalty scored); Abdi (penalty scored); Ba (penalty missed); El Taib (penalty scored)	4–3	(penalty scored) Said; (penalty scored) Fathy; (penalty scored) Homos; (penalty missed) Abougrisha; (penalty missed) Gamal

Camille Chamoun Stadium, Beirut
Referee: Mohamed Guezzaz (Morocco)

== Winners ==
2003–04 Arab Champions League
(Tunisia)
CS Sfaxien
Second title
