= David Degen =

Swiss footballer (born 1983)

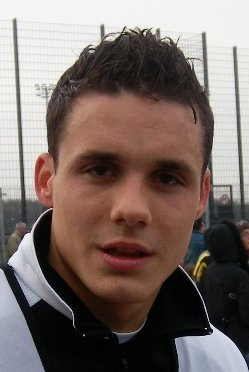
- Degen in January 2007

Personal information
- Full name: David Degen
- Date of birth: 15 February 1983 (age 43)
- Place of birth: Liestal, Switzerland
- Height: 1.83 m (6 ft 0 in)
- Position: Right winger

Youth career
- 1990–1996: Oberdorf
- 1996–1999: FC Basel
- 1999–2000: FC Aarau

Senior career*
Years	Team	Apps	(Gls)
2000–2003	FC Aarau	30	(3)
2003–2006	FC Basel	61	(8)
2006–2008	Borussia Mönchengladbach	18	(2)
2007–2008	→ FC Basel (loan)	20	(3)
2008–2012	Young Boys	106	(17)
2012–2014	FC Basel	34	(3)
Total		269	(36)

International career
2000–2001	Switzerland U17	10	(3)
2001	Switzerland U19	4	(0)
2002–2003	Switzerland U20	6	(0)
2003–2005	Switzerland U21	24	(6)
2006–2011	Switzerland	17	(0)
- * Club domestic league appearances and goals

David Degen (born 15 February 1983) is a Swiss former footballer who played mostly as a right midfielder. His twin brother Philipp Degen was also a professional football player.

== Club career ==
Degen started his youth football with local club FC Oberdorf. In 1996, he transferred to the youth teams of FC Basel playing in their U-18 and U-21 teams. He started his professional career at FC Aarau in 2000 but returned to Basel in 2003. With the club, during the Super League season 2003–04 and 2004–05, Degen won two domestic league titles.

Degen moved to Bundesliga club Borussia Mönchengladbach in 2006. He played his debut for Mönchengladbach on 14 October 2006 in the game against VfL Wolfsburg and scored his first goal for his new club in that game. However, after the club's relegation in the Bundesliga season 2006–07 into the 2. Bundesliga, Borussia manager Jos Luhukay loaned him out to his former club, Basel for the 2007–08 season. On 22 August 2008, he returned to Switzerland on a permanent deal with BSC Young Boys. Degen spent four seasons in Bern playing 106 league matches and scoring 17 goals.

On 31 May 2012, Basel announced that they had signed Degen on a contract up until June 2015 together with his brother Philipp. He started his first game for his team following his return against Servette FC on 13 July and scored the winning goal to the 1–0 victory. At the end of the Swiss Super League season 2012–13 Degen won the Championship title and was Swiss Cup runner up with Basel. In the 2012–13 UEFA Europa League Basel advanced as far as the semi-finals, there being matched against the reigning UEFA Champions League holders Chelsea, but were knocked out being beaten 2–5 on aggregate.

At the end of the 2013–14 Super League season Degan won his fifth league championship with Basel. They also reached the final of the 2013–14 Swiss Cup, but were beaten 2–0 by Zürich after extra time. In the 2013–14 Champions League season Basel in the group stage finished the group in third position to qualify for Europa League knockout phase and here they advanced as far as the quarter-finals. After the season Degen retired from professional football.

== International career ==
Degen was selected for the Swiss 2006 World Cup squad. However, he only played in the warm-up games. Degen was left out of the squad to play at UEFA Euro 2008.

== Career statistics ==
Club performance			League		Cup		Continental		Total	
Club	League	Season	Apps	Goals	Apps	Goals	Apps	Goals	Apps	Goals
FC Aarau	Nationalliga A	2000–01	5	1						
FC Aarau	Nationalliga A	2001–02	2	0						
FC Aarau	Nationalliga A	2002–03	23	2						
Total			30	3						
FC Basel	Swiss Super League	2003–04	22	2						
FC Basel	Swiss Super League	2004–05	16	1						
FC Basel	Swiss Super League	2005–06	23	5						
Total			61	8						
Borussia Mönchengladbach	Bundesliga	2006–07	18	2	1	0	–	–	19	2
Total			18	2	1	0	–	–	19	2
FC Basel	Swiss Super League	2007–08	20	3						
Total			20	3						
BSC Young Boys	Swiss Super League	2008–09	19	5						
BSC Young Boys	Swiss Super League	2009–10	30	6						
BSC Young Boys	Swiss Super League	2010–11	32	4						
BSC Young Boys	Swiss Super League	2011–12	25	2						
Total			106	17						
FC Basel	Swiss Super League	2012–13	26	3	1	0	8	1	35	3
FC Basel	Swiss Super League	2013–14	6	0	3	0	1	0	10	0
Total			32	3	4	0	9	1	45	3
Career Total			267	33						

== Honours ==
Basel

- Swiss Super League: 2003–04, 2004–05, 2007–08, 2012–13, 2013–14
- Swiss Cup: 2002–03, 2007–08
- Uhren Cup: 2003, 2013
