= Angelo Raso =

Italian footballer (born 1981)

Personal information
- Date of birth: 20 July 1981 (age 45)
- Height: 1.70 m (5 ft 7 in)
- Position: Defender

Team information
- Current team: AC Bellinzona
- Number: 7

Senior career*
Years	Team	Apps	(Gls)
2003–present	AC Bellinzona	170	(5)
- * Club domestic league appearances and goals as of 14 May 2012

Angelo Raso (born 20 July 1981) is an Italian football defender who plays for AC Bellinzona in the Swiss Challenge League.

== Career ==
Raso has spent his entire career with AC Bellinzona, only leaving on loan three times (to FC Chiasso, GC Biaschesi and FC Bodio). He stayed with the club after relegation from the Swiss Super League in 2011.
