= Racing Club Genève =

Swiss football club

- Full name: Racing Club Genève
- Founded: 1951
- Ground: Centre sportif du Bout-du-Monde, Genève
- Capacity: 1,000
- Chairman: Chagna, Khalid
- Manager: --
- League: 2. Liga Interregional (Retired)
Home colours	Away colours

Racing Club is a football club from Genève, Switzerland; the club was founded in 1951, and is currently playing in the 2. Liga Interregional.

== Players ==
Note: Flags indicate national team as defined under FIFA eligibility rules; some limited exceptions apply. Players may hold more than one non-FIFA nationality.

No.	Pos.	Nation	Player
8		SUI	Rami Chaer

== Presidents ==
Name	From	To
Chagna, Khalid	unknown	current

== Honours ==
=== Domestic ===
==== League ====
- None

==== Cups ====
- None
