= Cyril Zimmermann =

Swiss football referee (born 1976)

Cyril Zimmermann (born 16 January 1976) is a Swiss football referee. He became a FIFA referee in 2007. Previously he was a football player.
