= 2007–08 Swiss Super League =

111th season of top-tier Swiss football

Swiss Super League
- Season: 2007–08
- Dates: 18 July 2007 – 10 May 2008
- Champions: Basel; 12th title
- Relegated: Thun; St. Gallen
- Champions League: Basel
- UEFA Cup: Young Boys; Zürich; Bellinzona (via Swiss Cup)
- Intertoto Cup: Grasshopper
- Matches: 180
- Goals: 522 (2.9 per match)
- Top goalscorer: Hakan Yakin (24 goals)

The 2007–08 Swiss Super League was the 111th season of top-tier football in Switzerland. The competition was officially named AXPO Super League due to sponsoring purposes. It began on 18 July 2007 and has ended on 10 May 2008.

== League table ==
| Pos | Team | Pld | W | D | L | GF | GA | GD | Pts | Qualification or relegation |
|---|---|---|---|---|---|---|---|---|---|---|
| 1 | Basel (C) | 36 | 22 | 8 | 6 | 73 | 39 | +34 | 74 | Qualification to Champions League second qualifying round |
| 2 | Young Boys | 36 | 21 | 7 | 8 | 82 | 49 | +33 | 70 | Qualification to UEFA Cup second qualifying round |
| 3 | Zürich | 36 | 15 | 11 | 10 | 58 | 43 | +15 | 56 | Qualification to UEFA Cup second qualifying round |
| 4 | Grasshopper | 36 | 15 | 9 | 12 | 57 | 49 | +8 | 54 | Qualification to Intertoto Cup second round |
| 5 | Aarau | 36 | 11 | 14 | 11 | 47 | 48 | −1 | 47 | |
| 6 | Luzern | 36 | 10 | 14 | 12 | 40 | 49 | −9 | 44 | |
| 7 | Sion | 36 | 11 | 10 | 15 | 48 | 51 | −3 | 43 | |
| 8 | Neuchâtel Xamax | 36 | 10 | 11 | 15 | 48 | 55 | −7 | 41 | |
| 9 | St. Gallen (R) | 36 | 9 | 7 | 20 | 39 | 69 | −30 | 34 | Qualification to relegation play-off |
| 10 | Thun (R) | 36 | 6 | 9 | 21 | 30 | 70 | −40 | 27 | Relegation to Swiss Challenge League |

Source: RSSSF
Rules for classification: 1) points; 2) goal difference; 3) number of goals scored.
(C) Champions; (R) Relegated

== Results ==
Teams play each other four times in this league. In the first half of the season each team played every other team twice (home and away) and then do the same in the second half of the season.

=== First half of season ===
| Home \ Away | AAR | BAS | GCZ | LUZ | NX | SIO | STG | THU | YB | ZÜR |
|---|---|---|---|---|---|---|---|---|---|---|
| Aarau | | 0–3 | 2–2 | 0–0 | 3–2 | 2–0 | 2–2 | 5–0 | 1–1 | 1–1 |
| Basel | 1–1 | | 2–0 | 3–2 | 0–1 | 3–2 | 3–0 | 2–1 | 4–0 | 1–0 |
| Grasshopper | 1–1 | 2–0 | | 1–1 | 1–2 | 0–1 | 2–0 | 2–1 | 3–3 | 2–1 |
| Luzern | 0–0 | 2–4 | 3–3 | | 1–1 | 1–1 | 1–1 | 1–2 | 2–2 | 2–2 |
| Neuchâtel Xamax | 2–1 | 0–3 | 4–1 | 3–3 | | 1–3 | 1–1 | 1–1 | 3–1 | 1–1 |
| Sion | 3–0 | 1–1 | 0–1 | 0–0 | 1–1 | | 5–1 | 2–1 | 1–2 | 0–5 |
| St. Gallen | 1–1 | 0–3 | 5–3 | 1–2 | 2–1 | 1–0 | | 0–4 | 2–7 | 2–3 |
| Thun | 2–5 | 0–2 | 1–0 | 0–1 | 1–1 | 0–1 | 1–0 | | 0–0 | 1–1 |
| Young Boys | 4–1 | 5–1 | 3–2 | 6–1 | 3–2 | 1–0 | 3–1 | 0–0 | | 1–1 |
| Zürich | 0–1 | 2–2 | 4–0 | 4–1 | 1–0 | 4–1 | 3–1 | 3–1 | 5–1 | |

Legend: Blue = home team win; Yellow = draw; Red = away team win.

=== Second half of season ===
| Home \ Away | AAR | BAS | GCZ | LUZ | NX | SIO | STG | THU | YB | ZÜR |
|---|---|---|---|---|---|---|---|---|---|---|
| Aarau | | 2–2 | 1–2 | 2–1 | 2–2 | 2–0 | 3–1 | 3–0 | 0–2 | 1–0 |
| Basel | 2–1 | | 2–1 | 1–0 | 3–0 | 1–1 | 2–1 | 3–1 | 2–0 | 4–0 |
| Grasshopper | 2–0 | 1–1 | | 2–0 | 2–0 | 2–0 | 2–3 | 4–0 | 3–3 | 1–1 |
| Luzern | 2–0 | 1–0 | 0–0 | | 0–2 | 1–1 | 1–0 | 4–0 | 0–3 | 2–1 |
| Neuchâtel Xamax | 1–2 | 2–2 | 1–3 | 0–1 | | 1–1 | 1–0 | 0–2 | 3–1 | 3–1 |
| Sion | 1–0 | 4–2 | 0–2 | 0–0 | 2–0 | | 1–2 | 5–0 | 1–2 | 3–3 |
| St. Gallen | 0–0 | 1–4 | 0–2 | 2–1 | 0–0 | 1–2 | | 3–0 | 2–0 | 1–0 |
| Thun | 1–1 | 1–3 | 0–2 | 0–1 | 2–1 | 2–2 | 1–1 | | 0–4 | 1–1 |
| Young Boys | 4–0 | 2–0 | 2–0 | 0–1 | 1–3 | 3–1 | 3–0 | 4–2 | | 3–0 |
| Zürich | 0–0 | 1–1 | 1–0 | 1–0 | 2–1 | 2–1 | 1–0 | 1–0 | 1–2 | |

Legend: Blue = home team win; Yellow = draw; Red = away team win.

== Relegation play-offs ==
FC St. Gallen as 9th-placed team of the Super League were played a two-legged play-off against Challenge League runners-up AC Bellinzona.

17 May 2008
17:45 CEST

| Bellinzona | 3–2 | St. Gallen |
|---|---|---|
| Pouga 4'; Taljević 61'; Lulić 89' | | Ural 71'; Gelabert 76' |

Stadio Comunale, Bellinzona
Attendance: 7,000
Referee: René Rogalla

20 May 2008
19:45 CEST

| St. Gallen | 0–2 | Bellinzona |
|---|---|---|
| | | Neri 36'; Lulić 90+2' |

Espenmoos, St. Gallen
Attendance: 11,300
Referee: Jérôme Laperrière

Bellinzona won 5–2 on aggregate. St. Gallen are relegated to the Swiss Challenge League.

== Top goalscorers ==
| Rank | Player | Club | Goals |
|---|---|---|---|
| 1 | (Switzerland) Hakan Yakin | BSC Young Boys | 24 |
| 2 | (Switzerland) Thomas Häberli | BSC Young Boys | 18 |
| 2 | (Argentina) Raúl Bobadilla | Grasshopper Club Zürich | 18 |
| 4 | (Costa Rica) Álvaro Saborío | FC Sion | 17 |
| 5 | (Switzerland) Mauro Lustrinelli | FC Luzern | 14 |
| 6 | (Switzerland) Marco Streller | FC Basel | 12 |
| 6 | (Brazil) Raffael | FC Zürich | 12 |
| 6 | (Brazil) Rogério | FC Aarau | 12 |
| 9 | (Argentina) Francisco Aguirre | FC St. Gallen | 11 |
| 10 | (Sweden) Daniel Majstorović | FC Basel | 10 |

== Attendances ==
| # | Club | Average attendance | Highest attendance |
|---|---|---|---|
| 1 | Basel | 23,539 | 38,015 |
| 2 | Young Boys | 18,571 | 30,233 |
| 3 | Zürich | 12,186 | 25,200 |
| 4 | Sion | 11,056 | 16,000 |
| 5 | St. Gallen | 10,022 | 11,300 |
| 6 | Luzern | 9,181 | 13,000 |
| 7 | GCZ | 7,257 | 14,300 |
| 8 | Xamax | 6,582 | 11,997 |
| 9 | Aarau | 6,011 | 8,900 |
| 10 | Thun | 4,761 | 8,850 |

== Awards ==
- Super League Player of the Year: Hakan Yakin (BSC Young Boys)
- Goal of the Year: Mauro Lustrinelli (FC Lucerne, scored against FC Basel)
- Coach of the Year: Christian Gross (FC Basel)
- Youngster of the Year: Eren Derdiyok (FC Basel)
- Fair Play Trophy: FC Aarau
