= Iulian Filipescu =

Romanian footballer (born 1974)

Personal information
- Full name: Iulian Sebastian Filipescu
- Date of birth: 29 March 1974 (age 52)
- Place of birth: Slatina, Romania
- Height: 1.87 m (6 ft 2 in)
- Position: Centre back

Youth career
- –1991: Faur București

Senior career*
Years	Team	Apps	(Gls)
1991–1992	Faur București		
1992–1996	Steaua București	112	(8)
1997–1999	Galatasaray	59	(0)
1999–2003	Betis	126	(8)
2004–2006	FC Zürich	64	(1)
2006–2008	MSV Duisburg	52	(1)
Total		413	(18)

International career
1992–1995	Romania U21	19	(1)
1996–2003	Romania	52	(1)
- * Club domestic league appearances and goals

Iulian Sebastian Filipescu (born 29 March 1974) is a Romanian former professional footballer who played as a centre back.

== Club career ==
Filipescu was born in Slatina, Olt County.

He debuted in Divizia A with Steaua București in 1992, where he won seven domestic trophies. In 1997, he moved abroad joining Turkish team Galatasaray where he won three trophies. Later he joined Primera División club Real Betis, and played four and a half seasons there before joining FC Zürich. He retired in 2008 after he spent two seasons at MSV Duisburg.

During the 2006 Swiss Championship FC Basel 1893 were atop the league table, leading Zürich by three points heading into the last game of the season. Both teams met at that last game at St. Jakob Park, where Zürich needed to win to tie with Basel on points and take the title on superior goal differential. Alhassane Keita scored in the 31st minute and gave Zurich the advantage, Mladen Petrić tying it at 1–1 in the 73rd minute. In the 93rd, Filipescu scored the game-winning goal past Pascal Zuberbühler, with Zürich winning both the game 2–1 and the Swiss Super League title. After the final whistle, Basel fans stormed the pitch and chased the Zürich players and officials. Filipescu was the main target for scoring the winning goal and was almost hit by a large firework.

== International career ==
Filipescu made his debut for the Romania national team in 1996 against Yugoslavia, and represented his country at the UEFA Euro 1996, 1998 FIFA World Cup and UEFA Euro 2000. He played his last international match in 2003, earning 52 caps and scoring one goal.

== Career statistics ==
National team	Year	Apps	Goals
Romania	1996	9	0
Romania	1997	4	0
Romania	1998	10	0
Romania	1999	7	1
Romania	2000	11	0
Romania	2001	6	0
Romania	2002	2	0
Romania	2003	3	0
Total		52	1

Romania score listed first, score column indicates score after each Filipescu goal.

Goal	Date	Venue	Opponent	Score	Result	Competition
1	18 August 1999	Tsirio Stadium, Limassol, Cyprus	Cyprus	2–2	2–2	Friendly

== Honours ==
Steaua București

- Divizia A: 1992–93, 1993–94, 1994–95, 1995–96
- Cupa României: 1995–96
- Supercupa României: 1994, 1995

Galatasaray

- 1.Lig: 1996–97, 1997–98
- Turkish Cup runner-up: 1997–98

Zürich

- Swiss Super League: 2005–06
- Swiss Cup: 2004–05
