= 2007–08 FC Basel season =

FC Basel
2007–08 season
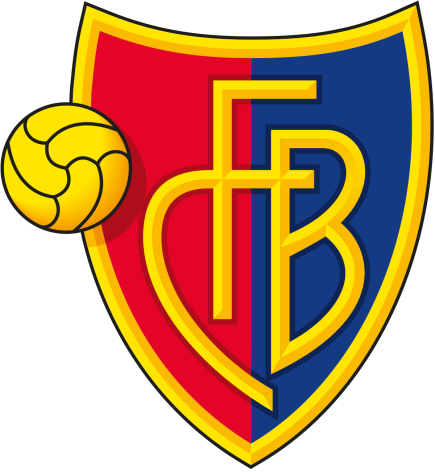
- Chairman: Gisela Oeri
- Manager: Christian Gross
- Swiss Super League: 1st (champions)
- Swiss Cup: Winners
- UEFA Cup: Round of 32
- Top goalscorer: League: Marco Streller (12); All: Marco Streller (17)
- Highest home attendance: Swiss Super League; 38,015 vs Young Boys (10 May 2008); UEFA Cup; 16,360 vs Sporting CP (13 February 2008)
- Lowest home attendance: Swiss Super League; 17,845 vs Xamax (9 February 2008); UEFA Cup; 9,203 vs Mattersburg (16 August 2007)
- Average home league attendance: 23,539
- Biggest win: 4–0 on 8 October 2007 vs Young Boys; 4–0 on 2 May 2008 vs Zürich
- Biggest defeat: 1–5 on 5 August 2007 away vs Young Boys

FC Basel started the 2007–08 season, the 115th season in their existence and 13th consecutive in the top flight of Swiss football, with various warm-up matches against Swiss lower league teams as well as Austrian Bundesliga, German Bundesliga, Scottish Premier League and French Ligue 1 clubs. FCB were looking to win the Swiss championship title for the first time since 2005 and regain the cup title that they won the year before. They also had the opportunity to compete in the UEFA Cup.

== Overview ==
At the beginning of the 2007–08 season, Basel strengthened their team by signing Swiss internationalists Benjamin Huggel from Eintracht Frankfurt, Marco Streller from VfB Stuttgart and David Degen on loan from Borussia Mönchengladbach. Carlitos transferred from Benfica in for an estimated €1.5 million (CHF 1,610,000). Five young talents were brought up from the under-21 team. In the other direction, fans' favourites Ivan Rakitić transferred to Schalke 04 (for an estimated CHF 4,830,000) and Mladen Petrić joined Borussia Dortmund (for an estimated CHF 5,635,000). Influential defender Boris Smiljanić returned to his former club, Grasshoppers.

During the winter break, highly rated Switzerland U-21 defender Beg Ferati arrived at St. Jakob-Park from feeder club Concordia Basel on a three-and-a-half-year contract. He was joined by midfielder Marko Perović from Red Star Belgrade and veteran striker Vratislav Lokvenc, on loan from Red Bull Salzburg. Also during the winter break Felipe Caicedo transferred to Manchester City on a four-and-a-half-year deal with a £5.2 million transfer fee (CHF 10 million), which made his sale one of the highest transfers in the history of the Swiss League.

== The campaign ==
=== Domestic league ===
Basel's priority for the season was to win the league championship. The Swiss Super League season began on 22 July. Basel's first game was at home to FC Zürich which was won 1–0. In the fourth and sixth round of the championship, Basel suffered two defeats, 1–5 against BSC Young Boys and 0–2 against Grasshopper Club, and slid down to the fourth position in the league table. It took them two months before they climbed back to the leading position. In this period they won nine and drew two of eleven games. Basel suffered a home defeat against Xamax directly before the winter break and the suffered another defeat in the away match against Young Boys directly as the second half of the season began. Nevertheless Basel stayed in top position in the league table until virtually the end of the championship, slipping to second position twice. The first time as they lost an away match against Luzern and the second time after an away draw against Aarau. In the last eight games of the season, Basel achieved only four victories and four draws. But the team played strong enough to regain the lead. Basel won the Swiss Super League for the first time since 2005 on the 10 May 2008 at St. Jakob-Park after a 2–0 win over their main title threats BSC Young Boys.

The championship decision was made in the last game of the season. FCB needed only a point from the match to win the Championship, however if YB won then they would have become champions. This was exactly the same situation as the end of the 2005–06 season, then the final match was between Basel and Zürich then. The memories of losing the league on the last day of the season in 2006 and the resulting 2006 Basel hooligan incident seemed to spur FCB on. Basel took an early lead through Valentin Stocker and a second goal scored by Marco Streller just a few minutes later wrapped up the victory well before half time.

FCB obtained 74 points to win the championship and qualify for Champions League second qualifying round. They were four points above YB with 70 points and 18 points ahead of third placed FCZ, who obtained 56 points. These two teams qualified to UEFA Cup second qualifying round. The bottom placed Thun suffered relegation and second last St. Gallen advanced to the relegation/promotion play-pff against Bellinzona. Bellinzona won the play-off and were promoted FCSG suffered relegation.

=== Domestic Cup ===
Basel's clear aim for the 2007–08 Swiss Cup was to retain the title that they had won the year before. The 10 clubs from the Swiss Super League as well as the 17 clubs of the Swiss Challenge League qualified directly for the cup and entered in the round of 64.

FC Léchelles

Basel were paired away against 5th tier FC Léchelles on 19 September 2007 and won with ease. Carlitos, Scott Chipperfield and Eduardo each scored two goals and David Degen, Kōji Nakata and team captain Ivan Ergić each scored one as Basel achieved the end result 9–0.

SC Binningen

They then faced local club SC Binningen, also from the 5th tier, away from home at the newly built Spiegelfeld stadium, on 20 October. This time captain Ivan Ergić scored two goals and David Degen, Carlitos, Eduardo and Benjamin Huggel each added another as Basel cruised to a 6–1 victory.

Grasshopper Club

Basel then faced a much tougher test in the third round. An away match against the Grasshoppers at the Letzigrund took place on 25 October. The game was equally balanced in a first half low on events. The best chance came from a bicycle kick from Scott Chipperfield. In the second half Basel put on the pressure and after 55 minutes were not awarded a penalty despite a foul on Streller. But nonetheless Basel won 1–0. The goal coming from the penalty spot, scored by Daniel Majstorović after a hand-ball from Guillermo Vallori.

Stade Nyonnais

On 15 December, third tier Stade Nyonnais travelled to St. Jakob-Park for the quarter-final. Basel played with second goalkeeper Louis Crayton in place of Franco Costanzo, who was rested in advance of the Uefa Cup game against Hamburger SV, which was a few days later. But it was the Nyonnaise keeper Mathey who saved four, five good attempts alone in the first half. He kept the game goalless at halftime. Stade Nyonnais fought hard as Basel added more pressure. Eren Derdiyok eventually put the hosts one up in the 53rd minute and they kept pressing giving keeper Mathey more chances to show his abilities. Derdiyok finished the game off with another goal in the 90th minute.

Thun

The semi-final saw Basel beat FC Thun 1–0 on 27 February. Again played in the St. Jakob-Park Vratislav Lokvenc, who was on loan from Red Bull Salzburg scored the only game of the match as early as the 12th minute.

Bellinzona

Basel were heavy favourites before the kick-off, not just because they were facing a lower league side but as the cup final was also being held in their home stadium, which is where UEFA Euro 2008 kicked off nine weeks later. It was Bellinzona, though, who had the better of the opening stages with Basel goalkeeper Franco Costanzo called into action several times. However, Eren Derdiyok scored the opening goal on 31 minutes to calm down things for the Swiss league leaders. Bellinzona equalised after 58 minutes through Christian Pouga but their euphoria was short-lived as they conceded three times in as many minutes to lose any chance of causing an upset. Four minutes later Daniel Majstorovic headed in, substitute Marco Streller made it 3–1 and fellow Swiss international Benjamin Huggel put the match beyond doubt in the 66th minute to make the final scoreline 4–1 in Basel's favour. Basel won the Swiss Cup for the second consecutive season after beating second-tier side AC Bellinzona 4–1 at St. Jakob-Park on 6 April 2008.

Conclusion

Basel's aim for the Swiss Cup was to retain the title and this was achieved with ease.

=== Europe ===
Because Basel entered the 2007–08 UEFA Cup in the second qualifying round, the club set their aim as to reach the group stage. The draw was held on Friday, 3 August 2007 at 13:00 CET in Nyon, Switzerland. It was conducted by UEFA General Secretary David Taylor and Giorgio Marchetti, UEFA's director of professional football. The matches were to be played on 16 and 30 August 2007.

Mattersburg

Basel were drawn against a tough opponent in the form of SV Mattersburg of Austria. Mattersburg were Austrian league leaders at the time, with an unbeaten run. The first leg was held at the St. Jakob-Park on 16 August 2007 under referee Martin Ingvarsson of the Swedish Football Association. Basel began strongly, had their fifth corner in the twelfth minute but Scott Chipperfield's good shot was deflected only a short distance wide of the goal. Mattersburg's defender Cem Atan saw his second yellow card after just 17 minutes and was sent off. Nevertheless it was the Austrian team who shortly afterwards took the lead. Basel's defender Nakata deflected a shot into their own goal after 20 minutes. Basel's reply was immediate, capitan Ergić equalised just three minutes later. Mattersburg goalkeeper Robert Almer played strongly, showing six or seven good saves and denying Basel the lead. This eventually came in the 57th minute from Caicedo. Mattersburg were overwhelmed but their keeper kept showing good work. In the end the 2–1 victory meant a lot of work, but too little yield.

Return match

Basel won the tie straight off with an easy away win in the Pappelstadion on 30 August, under referee Selçuk Dereli from the Turkish Football Federation. Felipe Caicedo put the visitors one up after 22 minutes, captain Ergić added a second after 36 and Streller netted the third after 40. Basel had decided the game before half time and they played the rest of the game in a lower gear. Eight minutes after the break Carlitos increased the score to the final score of 4–0 and 6–1 on aggregate.

FK Sarajevo

In the next round, Basel were drawn against Bosnian minnows FK Sarajevo in the first round. The first leg was played on 20 September in front of 6,000 spectators in the Asim Ferhatović Hase Stadium in Sarajevo under referee Lajuks of the Latvian Football Federation. Carlitos put the visitors in the lead in the 11th minute and captain Ergić added a second after 63 minutes. Basel again played the rest of the game in a lower gear. In the third minute of added time Semjon Milošević scored for the hosts, but this was much too late to make a difference.

Return match

The return leg was played on 4 October in the St. Jakob-Park. Basel started quickly. Carlitos netted the first goal in the eighth minute and added a second just one minute later. Then came Swiss international Streller double into the scorers list, scoring his first in the 19th minute and his second ten minutes later. This was the half time score. Basel played as though it was a friendly match, not wishing to hurt themselves or be injured by their opponents, so not really entering the tackles. Huggel scored the team's fifth goal on 75 minutes and then Felipe Caicedo added a sixth as the game entered the added time. The game ended 6–0 and Basel won 8–1 on aggregate.

Basel advanced to the group stage. Due to the fact that they had reached the group stage their aim was modified and was set as to remain in the competition over the winter break. The draw for the group stage, which was conducted by UEFA's director of professional football Giorgio Marchetti and Michele Centenaro, UEFA's head of club competitions, was held on Tuesday, 9 October 2007 at 12:00 CET in Nyon, Switzerland. Basel were then drawn into a group of death, Group D, alongside Brann, Dinamo Zagreb, Hamburger SV and Rennes, all of which were ranked within the top three of their respective leagues at the start of the stage.

Rennes

The first group match was at home, in front of a small crowd of just 11,407 spectators, on 27 October against French team Rennes under referee Nicola Rizzoli from the Italian Football Federation. Basel started well into the match and almost worked themselves an early advantage when Ivan Ergić's fierce free-kick was tipped around the post by Rennes goalkeeper Patrice Luzi. Rennes were second best at the beginning, but gradually began to work their way into the game with Franco Costanzo having to move quickly to save Sylvain Marveaux's effort on 27 minutes, before watching Bruno Cheyrou's powerful shot sail over the bar three minutes later. However, Basel ended the first half as they had begun it, strong. Scott Chipperfield hit a long-range shot that was well caught by Luzi and minutes later Felipe Caicedo fired an effort narrowly wide of the left-hand post. After the restart, Rennes again worked Costanzo, but the goalkeeper was more than equal to Jimmy Briand's strike. The decisive moment came soon after as Marco Streller jumped higher than the Rennes defencef's to head in Chipperfield's corner. Caicedo almost doubled Basel's lead soon after, with a shot out of the distance that flew narrowly wide. Having survived that, Rennes pressed for an equaliser but the closest they came was a shot by Mickaël Pagis that drifted wide as Basel achieved their victory.

Dinamo Zagreb

Their next game was away to Dinamo Zagreb, in the Maksimir Stadium, in which Basel earned a valuable away point because of on form goalkeeper Franco Costanzo, who kept the game at 0–0 for 90 minutes. On the 8 November, in front of 28,000 spectators, FC Basel goalkeeper Costanzo was in inspired form as the Swiss side earned a valuable point. The Argentinian keeper twice tipped good drives over the bar to keep the visitors in the match, but the hosts only had themselves to blame for not capitalising on a dominant performance. Gordon Schildenfeld and Mario Mandžukić were both guilty of bad misses and Dinamo's evening was summed up in the final minute when Ognjen Vukojević saw his effort cannon back off the post. Yet it was Basel that begun the brightest as they sought to build on their 1–0 victory against Stade Rennes a fortnight before. Scott Chipperfield was the instigator of much of their attacking play, and Daniel Majstorovic twice headed over crosses from the Australian when he should have done better. It proved a false dawn, however, and Dinamo soon found their rhythm as Mandžukić and Hrvoje Čale both tried their luck from distance. Ivan Ergić warmed Dinamo keeper George Koch's hands at the other end, though Basel found relief harder and harder to come by as the game went on. Midway through the first half Schildenfeld contrived to head Luka Modrić's corner wide, while Mandžukić, Vukojević and Franck Manga Guela all fired long-distance efforts off target. Costanzo was called upon soon after half-time to tip over Vukojević's curling effort and was on hand to collect Schildenfeld's header soon after. It was all Dinamo as Costanzo made further stops to deny substitute Carlos and then Mandžukić yet again. It was an evening to forget for the 21-year-old Mandžukić who headed a glorious chance wide and when Vukojević saw his effort hit the post, Dinamo knew their luck was out as Basel held on.

SK Brann

Basel then faced Brann at St. Jakob-Park on 5 December, where they won 1–0 through a Carlitos free-kick and were highly praised for playing attractive and flowing football. Both teams made enterprising starts, although chances were chiefly of the half variety, usually shots from range. Brann midfielder Petter Vaagan Moen and Carlitos traded such efforts before the Basel man broke the deadlock in the 39th minute. Having been fouled by Ramiro Corrales, Carlitos took the free-kick himself and fired beyond Håkon Opdal. The goalkeeper then had to be at his best to ensure Brann went in just a goal behind, diving to keep out a powerful Reto Zanni drive. The Norwegian champions pressed for an equaliser in the second half, but were largely frustrated by a Basel defence that was content to hold on to the narrow advantage. Joakim Sjöhage, Vaagan Moen and Huseklepp all had chances but Franco Costanzo was equal to all of them.

Hamburger SV

Basel then went to Germany to face Hamburger SV at the HSH Nordbank Arena on 20 December in front of 48,917 spectators under referee Nicolai Vollquartz from the Danish Football Association. Both clubs had already qualified for the knock out phase, and it was the home side who began better, Nigel de Jong meeting Rafael van der Vaart's free-kick with his head and forcing Franco Costanzo to save with his right foot before he reacted smartly to keep out Bastian Reinhardt's follow-up effort. The Basel goalkeeper held Hamburg at bay throughout the first half, despite the fact that Ivica Olić and Var der Vaart had three presentable chances in quick succession after about half-hours play. Because Basel playmaker Carlitos was well marked by the home defence, Basel struggled to create much in attack and their prospects looked bad when Reto Zanni brought down Vincent Kompany and then saw his second yellow card in the 50th minute. However, eight minutes later Ivan Ergić reacted fastest to push in Benjamin Huggel's mis-hit shot from a Michel Morganella cross. Just as Basel might have been thinking about holding on for the three points, Romeo Castelen raced down the right wing and crossed for the waiting Olić to shoot in the equaliser and ensured his side would finish above their opponents. Hamburger SV claimed first place Group D as Olić's late goal earned a 1–1 draw against ten-man FC Basel.

The draw for the round of 32 was held on Friday, 21 December 2007 at 13:00 CET in Nyon, Switzerland. The eight group winners were drawn against the eight third-placed teams, while the eight second-placed teams were drawn against the eight teams who finished third in the Champions League groups. Teams from the same group or the same country cannot be drawn together. Basel then faced Sporting CP in the round of 32 after qualifying in second position in the group alongside Hamburg and Brann. Sporting CP finished third in their group in the UEFA Champions League, which is why they were dropped into the UEFA Cup.

Sporting CP

The first leg took place on the 13 February 2008 at the Estádio José Alvalade in Lisbon with referee Kevin Blom from Royal Dutch Football Association. The visitors almost went into the lead inside three minutes when Carlitos' corner came to captain Ivan Ergić whose header went just over. Instead it was Sporting who took went ahead in the eighth minute, Simon Vukčević finishing into the bottom corner after being set up by Leandro Romagnoli's neat pass. But that was a rare foray forward for the home side as Basel dominated possession early on. David Degen going closest to bringing them level with a volley which fizzed over. The visitors suffered a blow a minute before the break when goalkeeper Franco Costanzo was forced off with injury to be replaced by Liberia international Louis Crayton. Vukčević gave the new goalkeeper no chance as he doubled the lead after 58 minutes, drilling João Moutinho's right-wing cross high into the top corner from the right side of the area.

Return match

One week later, on 21 February 2008, the return leg did not fare any better for Basel. Costanzo was still out injured and Basel lost 3–0 in the home match, resulting in them being knocked out 5–0 on aggregate. The visitors enjoyed a perfect start at St. Jakob-Park when Bruno Pereirinha broke the deadlock after just two minutes. It left Basel needing to score four times. Sporting's keeper Rui Patrício was tested twice after quarter of an hour, first by Eduardo's long-range effort and then Eren Derdiyok's shot from the left side of the area. Patrício also blocked well to deny Ivan Ergić's volley from ten metres. Liédson ended home hopes with two goals either side of half-time.

Conclusion

This rounded off a successful season for Basel, as they won both the Swiss Super League and Swiss Cup, and reaching the last 32 of the UEFA Cup. Basel achieved all of their aims. Next season they had the opportunity to qualify for the 2008–09 UEFA Champions League.

== Club ==
=== The Management ===
Position	Staff
Manager	(Switzerland) Christian Gross
Assistant manager	(Switzerland) Fritz Schmid
Fitness Coach	(Switzerland) Thomas Grüter
Fitness Coach	(Switzerland) Romain Crevoisier
Youth Team Coach	(Switzerland) Patrick Rahmen
Youth Team Co-Coach	(Switzerland) Sandro Kamber

Last updated: 17 May 2008

=== Kit ===
Supplier: Nike
Sponsor(s): Novartis

Home	Away

Source: Homepage FCB

=== Other information ===
Chairman	(Switzerland) Mrs Gisela Oeri
Ground (capacity and dimensions)	St. Jakob-Park (42,500 / 120x80 m)

Source: Homepage FCB

== Players ==
=== First team squad ===
Note: Flags indicate national team as defined under FIFA eligibility rules; some limited exceptions apply. Players may hold more than one non-FIFA nationality.

No.	Pos.	Nation	Player
1	GK	ARG	Franco Costanzo
3	DF	SUI	Ronny Hodel
4	DF	SUI	Michel Morganella
5	DF	SWE	Daniel Majstorović (vicecaptain)
6	DF	JPN	Kōji Nakata
8	MF	SUI	Benjamin Huggel
9	FW	ARG	César Carignano
9	MF	SRB	Marko Perović
10	FW	SUI	Marco Streller
11	MF	AUS	Scott Chipperfield
12	MF	SEN	Papa Malick Ba
14	MF	SUI	Valentin Stocker
15	MF	LIE	Franz Burgmeier
16	MF	SUI	Fabian Frei
17	DF	SUI	Patrik Baumann

No.	Pos.	Nation	Player
18	GK	LBR	Louis Crayton
19	FW	CZE	Vratislav Lokvenc
20	MF	ECU	Felipe Caicedo
21	DF	FRA	François Marque
22	MF	SRB	Ivan Ergić (captain)
23	FW	BRA	Eduardo
24	MF	SUI	Cabral
25	GK	SUI	Jayson Leutwiler
(25)	GK	SUI	Riccardo Meili
28	DF	SUI	Beg Ferati
30	MF	POR	Carlitos
31	FW	SUI	Eren Derdiyok
32	DF	SUI	Reto Zanni (vicecaptain)
34	GK	SUI	Oliver Stöckli
37	MF	SUI	David Degen

==== Multiple Nationality ====
- 1 (Argentina) (Italy) Franco Costanzo
- 5 (Sweden) (Serbia) Daniel Majstorović
- 9 (Serbia) (Kosovo) Marko Perović
- 11 (Australia) (Switzerland) Scott Chipperfield
- 18 (Liberia) (Switzerland) Louis Crayton
- 22 (Serbia) (Australia) Ivan Ergić
- 24 (Switzerland) (Cape Verde) Cabral
- 28 (Switzerland) (Kosovo) Beg Ferati
- 31 (Switzerland) (Turkey) Eren Derdiyok

=== Transfers summer 2007 ===
==== In ====
3	DF	SUI	Ronny Hodel (from Young Boys – for 483,000 SFr)
4	DF	SUI	Michel Morganella (from FC Basel II (U21))
8	MF	SUI	Benjamin Huggel (from Eintracht Frankfurt – for 805,000 SFr)
10	FW	SUI	Marco Streller (from Stuttgart – for 2,415,000 SFr)
14	MF	SUI	Valentin Stocker (from FC Basel II (U21))
16	MF	SUI	Fabian Frei (from FC Basel II (U21))
24	MF	SUI	Cabral (from Lausanne-Sport – free transfer)
25	GK	SUI	Jayson Leutwiler (from FC Basel II (U21))
30	MF	POR	Carlitos (from Benfica – for 1,610,000 SFr)
31	FW	SUI	Eren Derdiyok (from FC Basel II (U21))
9	FW	ARG	César Carignano (return from loan to América)

==== In on loan ====
7	MF	SUI	David Degen (loan from Borussia Mönchengladbach – Loan)
(25)	GK	SUI	Riccardo Meili (on loan from FC Concordia Basel 18 July to 7 August)

==== Out ====
—	MF	BIH	Damir Džombić (to Vaduz)
—	FW	BRA	Cristiano (to Willem II)
—	MF	AUS	Mile Sterjovski (to Gençlerbirliği – free transfer)
—	FW	CRO	Mladen Petrić (to Borussia Dortmund – 5,635,000 SFr)
—	MF	CRO	Ivan Rakitić (to Schalke 04 – for 4,830,000 SFr)
—	FW	RSA	Delron Buckley (returned to Borussia Dortmund after loan)
—	DF	SUI	Boris Smiljanić (to Grasshopper Club Zürich – 966,000 SFr)

==== Out on loan ====
(25)	GK	SUI	Yann Sommer (on loan to Vaduz)
29	MF	SUI	Simone Grippo (on loan to FC Concordia Basel)
(25)	GK	SUI	Jayson Leutwiler (on loan to FC Concordia Basel 18 July to 7 August)

=== Transfers winter 2007–08 ===
==== In ====
9	MF	SRB	Marko Perović (from Red Star Belgrade)

==== In on loan ====
19	FW	CZE	Vratislav Lokvenc (on loan from Red Bull Salzburg from 14 February until 30 June 2008)
34	GK	SUI	Oliver Stöckli (on loan from FC Winterthur from 19 February until 30 June 2008)

==== Out ====
9	FW	ARG	César Carignano (released from contract)
20	MF	ARG	Caicedo (to Manchester City)
--	FW	SUI	Danijel Subotić (to Portsmouth F.C.)

==== Out on loan ====
17	DF	SUI	Patrik Baumann (on loan to FC Concordia Basel 1 January to 30 June)
15	MF	LIE	Franz Burgmeier (on loan to Thun 5 January to 30 June)

== Results and fixtures ==
=== Friendly matches ===
==== Pre- and mid-season friendlies ====
27 June 2007 Pre-season	Basel	2–0	Wil	San Gian, Celerina
18:30	F. Frei 1' (1:0); Hodel (yellow card) 30'; Stocker 32' (2:0)	Summary		Attendance: 600; Referee: Patrick Collet

30 June 2007 Pre-season	Basel	1–3	Concordia Basel	Stadion Rankhof, Basel
17:00	Chipperfield 1' (1:0)	Summary	37' (1:1) Kolling; 38' (1:2) Sprunger; 53' (1:3) Sprunger	Attendance: 3,000

3 July 2007 Uhrencup; Round 1	Basel	3–1	Red Bull Salzburg	Stadion Brühl, Grenchen
20:15	F. Frei 21' (1:0); Eduardo 71' (2:0), 80' (3:0)	Summary	83' (pen. 3:1) Santos	Attendance: 2,754; Referee: Nicole Petignat

5 July 2007 Uhrencup; Round 2	Basel	0–1	Celtic	Stadion Brühl, Grenchen
20:45		Summary	42' Miller	Attendance: 8,612 (sold out); Referee: Guido Wildhaber

7 July 2007 Pre-season	Luzern	1–1	Basel	Seefeld, Horw
18:30	Mendes (yellow card) 45'; Lustrinelli 54' (1:0)	Summary	(yellow card) 72' Eduardo; (yellow card) 75' Huggel; 82' (1:1) Eduardo	Attendance: 3,126; Referee: Guido Wildhaber

11 July 2007 Pre-season	Basel	1–2	RC Lens	Stampfi, Rothrist
19:45	Derdiyok 20' (1:0); Ba (yellow card) 38'	Summary	31' (1:1) Monterrubio; 49' (1:2) Sablé	Attendance: 2,000; Referee: (Switzerland) Nicole Petignat
Note: Anniversary game for 50 years of FC Rothrist.

14 July 2007 Pre-season	Basel	2–0	Werder Bremen	Sportpark Eschen-Mauren, Liechtenstein
19:00	Huggel 27' (1:0); F. Frei 29' (2:0)	Summary		Attendance: 1,600; Referee: Nicole Petignat
Note: Corners 1:5 (1:2). Fair game, no yellow cards.

11 September 2007 Mid-season	SC Dornach	1–5	Basel	Gigersloch, Dornach
19:00	Dario Di Giovine 66' (1:4)	Summary	3' (0:1) Carlitos; 12' (0:2) Carlitos; 25' (pen. 0:3) Ergić; 27' (0:4) Chipperfield; 83' (1:5) Halimi	Attendance: 500; Referee: Claudio Circhetta
Note: Corners 4:4

16 October 2007 Mid-season	FC Rothrist	0–11	Basel	Sportplatz Stampfi
19:15		Summary	14' (0:1) Eduardo; 16' (0:2) Ergić; 22' (0:3) Nakata; 24' (0:4) Caicedo; 31' (0:5) Eduardo; 37' (o.g. 0:6) Della Porta; 45' (0:7) Caicedo; 48' (o.g. 0:8) Mijatovic; 67' (0:9) F. Frei; 81' (0:10) Carlitos; 86' (0:11) Ivo Pedro	Attendance: 380; Referee: Sascha Amhof
Note: FCB with test players Ivo Pedro (Ivo Pedro Krenczynski Welter) and Samet Gündüz from youth team

20 November 2007 Mid-season	FC Solothurn	1–5	Basel	Stadion FC Solothurn
18:00	Hasler 56' (1:2)	Summary	(penalty missed) 20′ Ergić; 25' (0:1) Carlitos; 50' (0:2) Ergić; 64' (1:3) Derdiyok; 80' (1:4) Carlitos; 84' (1:5) F. Frei	Attendance: 3,500; Referee: Daniel Käser

==== Winter break and mid-season friendlies ====
12 January 2008 Winter break	Basel	6–0	FC Solothurn	Schützenmatte, Basel
15:00	Eduardo 8' (1:0); D. Degen 25' (2:0); D. Degen 26' (3:0); Caicedo 29' (4:0); D. Degen 43' (5:0); Derdiyok 87' (6:0)	Summary		Attendance: 650; Referee: Martin Schneider
Note: Corners: 5:1 (3:0)

17 January 2008 Training camp	VfL Bochum	2–2	Basel	Sportplatz La Manga, La Manga
16:00	Šesták 8' (1:0); Mięciel 70' (2:1)	Summary	50' (1:1) Derdiyok; 90+1' (pen. 2:2) Majstorović	Attendance: 250; Referee: Sanchez Canovas Edward (Alicante)

20 January 2008 Training camp	1899 Hoffenheim	3–2	Basel	Sportplatz La Manga, La Manga
11:00	Teber 4' (1:0); Carlos Eduardo 22' (pen. 2:0); Obasi 40' (3:1)	Summary	35' (2:1) Marque; 71' (pen. 3:2) D. Degen	Attendance: 100; Referee: Lopez Martinez (Murcia)

22 January 2008 Training camp	Wisła Kraków	1–2	Basel	Stadium Campoamor, Alicante
16:00	Díaz (63.)	Summary	28' (0:1) Brożek; 49' (0:2) Zienzczuk	Attendance: 50; Referee: Canovas Edward (Alcante)

25 January 2008 Winter break	Schalke 04	1–0	Basel	Veltins-Arena, Gelsenkirchen
19:00	Asamoah 44' (1:0)	Summary	(yellow card) 32' Caicedo	Attendance: 39,158; Referee: Dirk Margenberg (Wermelskirchen)

29 January 2008 Winter break	Basel	1–0	Yverdon-Sport	Schützenmatte, Basel
15:00	Caicedo 81' (1:0)	Summary	(yellow card) 88' Sejmenovic	Attendance: 250; Referee: Claudio Circhetta

12 March 2008 Mid-season	Sochaux	3–1	Basel	Espace 2000, Bartenheim
16:00	Traoré 34'; Dramé 64'; Sène (yellow card) 67'; Pancrate 84'	Summary	53' D. Degen; (yellow card) 76' Lokvenc	Attendance: 150; Referee: Fatih Kiligoglu (Strasbourg)

=== Swiss Super League ===
==== First half of season ====
22 July 2007 Round 1	Basel	1–0	Zürich	St. Jakob-Park, Basel
20:15	Streller 69'; Burgmeier (yellow card) 88'	Summary	(yellow card) 26' Rochat; (yellow card) 90+1' Tico	Attendance: 27,680; Referee: (Switzerland) Carlo Bertolini

25 July 2007 Round 2	St. Gallen	0–3	Basel	Espenmoos, St. Gallen
19:45	Gelabert (yellow card) 59' (yellow-red card) 78'; Marazzi (yellow card) 61'	Summary	16' (0:1) Chipperfield; 26' (0:2) Derdiyok; (yellow card) 40' Marque; 45' (0:3) Derdiyok; (yellow card) 49' Ba; (yellow card) 51' Majstorović	Attendance: 10,500; Referee: (Switzerland) Jérôme Laperrière

28 July 2007 Round 3	Basel	1–1	Aarau	St. Jakob-Park, Basel
17:45	Zanni (yellow card) 47'; Chipperfield 64' (1:1)	Summary	45' (0:1) Rogério; (yellow card) 88' Mesbah	Attendance: 20,841; Referee: (Switzerland) Bruno Grossen

5 August 2007 Round 4	BSC Young Boys	5–1	Basel	Stade de Suisse, Bern
16:00	João Paulo 2' (1:0); Schneuwly (yellow card) 11'; Raimondi 17' (2:0); João Paulo 57' (3:0); Frimpong 71' (4:0); Frimpong 75' (5:0)	Summary	(yellow card) 12' Nakata; (yellow card) 19' Zanni; (yellow card) 34' Majstorović; (yellow card) 80' Costanzo; 87' (5:1) Chipperfield	Attendance: 25,020; Referee: (Switzerland) Massimo Busacca

11 August 2007 Round 5	Basel	3–2	Sion	St. Jakob-Park, Basel
17:45	Majstorović 28' (1:0); Eduardo 39' (2:0); Carlitos (yellow card) 83'; Ergić 90+1' (3:2)	Summary	(yellow card) 44' Reset; (yellow card) 54' Obradović; 69' (2:1) Vanczák; (yellow card) 75' M'Futi; 84' (2:2) Chedli	Attendance: 23,583; Referee: (Switzerland) Cyril Zimmermann

19 August 2007 Round 6	Grasshopper Club	2–0	Basel	Hardturm, Zürich
16:00	Touré 25' (1:0); Smiljanić (yellow card) 45'; Eduardo 63' (2:0); Eduardo (yellow card) 68'	Summary	(red card) 63' Zanni; (yellow card) 66' Majstorović; (yellow card) 81' Huggel	Attendance: 12,700; Referee: (Switzerland) Jérôme Laperrière

25 August 2007 Round 7	Luzern	2–4	Basel	Stadion Allmend Luzern
17:45	Lustrinelli 13' (1:0) (yellow card) 18'; Cantaluppi 31' (2:2)	Summary	22' (pen. 1:1) Majstorović; 27' (1:2) Streller; 56' (2:3) Chipperfield; 63' (2:4) Chipperfield; (yellow card) 73' Morganella	Attendance: 10,287; Referee: (Switzerland) Massimo Busacca

2 September 2007 Round 8	Basel	2–1	Thun	St. Jakob-Park, Basel
16:00	Caicedo 44' (1:0); Chipperfield (yellow card) 75'; Chipperfield 90+1' (2:1)	Summary	70' (1:1) Faye; (yellow card) 73' Glarner	Attendance: 22,119; Referee: (Switzerland) Daniel Wermelinger

23 September 2007 Round 9	Xamax	0–3	Basel	Stade de la Maladière, Neuchâtel
16:00	Everson (red card) 74'; Rak (yellow card) 74'	Summary	(yellow card) 10' Zanni; 20' (0:1) Carlitos; (yellow card) 63' Huggel; 76' (0:2) Ergić; 90+3' (pen. 0:3) Huggel	Attendance: 11,997; Referee: (Switzerland) Guido Wildhaber

26 September 2007 Round 10	Zürich	2–2	Basel	Letzigrund, Zürich
20:15	Chikhaoui 62' (1:0); Raffael (yellow card) 75'; Hassli 90+2' (2:2)	Summary	(yellow card) 33' D. Degen; (yellow card) 60' Huggel; 67' (1:1) Eduardo; 77' (1:2) Streller; (yellow card) 88' Majstorović	Attendance: 14,500; Referee: (Switzerland) Massimo Busacca

30 September 2007 Round 11	Basel	3–0	St. Gallen	St. Jakob-Park, Basel
16:00	Streller 2' (1:0); Streller 65' (2:0); Caicedo 75' (3:0); Caicedo (yellow card) 75'	Summary	(yellow card) 20' Garat; (yellow card) 21' Muntwiler; (yellow card) 27' (red card) 52' Longo; (yellow card) 71' Fernando	Attendance: 23,491; Referee: (Switzerland) Carlo Bertolini

7 October 2007 Round 12	Aarau	0–3	Basel	Stadion Brügglifeld, Aarau
16:00		Summary	17' (0:1) Nakata; 37' (0:2) Eduardo; 41' (0:3) Streller; (yellow card) 42' Majstorović	Attendance: 8,900; Referee: (Switzerland) Sascha Kever

28 October 2007 Round 13	Basel	4–0	BSC Young Boys	St. Jakob-Park, Basel
19:30	Majstorović 17' (pen. 1:0); Caicedo (yellow card) 30'; Streller 34' (2:0); Chipperfield 52' (3:0); Carlitos 74' (4:0)	Summary	(yellow card) 26' (yellow-red card) 31' Varela; (yellow card) 45' Regazzoni; (yellow card) 46' Zayatte; (red card) 84' João Paulo	Attendance: 24,720; Referee: (Switzerland) Massimo Busacca

31 October 2007 Round 14	Sion	1–1	Basel	Stade Tourbillon, Sion
19:45	Galindo (yellow card) 55'; Saborío 57' (1:1); Obradović (yellow card) 66'; Alioui (yellow card) 69'	Summary	43' (0:1) Streller; (yellow card) 46' Caicedo; (yellow card) 57' Eduardo; (yellow card) 84' Costanzo	Attendance: 10,500; Referee: (Switzerland) Nicole Petignat

3 November 2007 Round 15	Basel	2–0	Grasshopper Club	St. Jakob-Park, Basel
17:45	Majstorović 25' (1:0); Marque (yellow card) 30'; D. Degen (yellow card) 44'; Caicedo 90+2' (2:0)	Summary	(yellow card) 24' Feltscher; (yellow card) 40' Bobadilla; (yellow card) 87' Smiljanić	Attendance: 24.851; Referee: (Switzerland) Guido Wildhaber

11 November 2007 Round 16	Basel	3–2	Luzern	St. Jakob-Park, Basel
16:00	Streller 3' (1:0); Caicedo 15' (2:0); Majstorović (yellow card) 44'; D. Degen 56' (3:1)	Summary	(yellow card) 27' (red card) 81' Marić; 49' (2:1) Wiss; 62' (3:2) Tchouga	Attendance: 21,575; Referee: (Switzerland) René Rogalla

2 December 2007 Round 17	Thun	0–2	Basel	Stadion Lachen, Thun
16:00	Lüthi (yellow card) 59'	Summary	27' (0:1) Eduardo; 74' (0:2) Carlitos	Attendance: 5,000; Referee: (Switzerland) Cyril Zimmermann

9 December 2007 Round 18	Basel	0–1	Xamax	St. Jakob-Park, Basel
16:00	Ba (yellow card) 28'; Huggel (yellow card) 36'; Nakata (yellow card) 58'; Carlitos (yellow card) 72'	Summary	(yellow card) 32' (yellow-red card) 90+2' Everson; (yellow card) 40' Jenny; 65' (pen. 0:1) Rossi	Attendance: 22,022; Referee: (Switzerland) Bruno Grossen

==== Second half of season ====
3 February 2008 Round 19	BSC Young Boys	2–0	Basel	Stade de Suisse, Bern
16:00	Baykal (yellow card) 15'; Häberli 48' (1:0); Hochstrasser (yellow card) 69'; H. Yakin (yellow card) 68', (goal) 78' (pen. 2:0); Doubai (yellow card) 75'; Hodel (yellow card) 90+2'	Summary	(yellow card) 75' (red card) 79' Majstorović	Attendance: 19,768; Referee: (Switzerland) Carlo Bertolini

9 February 2008 Round 20	Basel	3–0	Xamax	St. Jakob-Park, Basel
17:45	Carlitos 9' (1:0); Zanni (yellow card) 19'; Huggel 74' (2:0); Marque (yellow card) 77'; Quennoz (yellow card) 45' (red card) 93'; Perović 90+4' (4:0)	Summary	(yellow card) 77' Rossi; (yellow card) 79' Zuberbühler	Attendance: 17,845; Referee: (Switzerland) Jérôme Laperrière

17 February 2008 Round 21	Zürich	1–1	Basel	Letzigrund, Zürich
16:00	Stucki (yellow card) 29'; Tihinen (yellow card) 45'; Chikhaoui (yellow card) 38', (goal) 90+1' (pen. 1:1); Abdi (yellow card) 78' (red card) 90+2'	Summary	(yellow card) 37' Derdiyok; 41' Derdiyok; (yellow card) 64' Perović; (yellow card) 84' Carlitos; (yellow card) 94' Huggel	Attendance: 14,100; Referee: (Switzerland) Massimo Busacca

24 February 2008 Round 22	Basel	2–1	Aarau	St. Jakob-Park, Basel
16:00	Majstorović 14' (pen. 1:0); Eduardo (yellow card) 49'; Perović (yellow card) 65'; Carlitos 71' (2:1); Crayton (yellow card) 83'	Summary	(yellow card) 13' Christ; 27' (1:1) Page; (yellow card) 88' Mutsch	Attendance: 20,521; Referee: (Switzerland) Carlo Bertolini

2 March 2008 Round 23	Thun	1–3	Basel	Stadion Lachen, Thun
16:00	Burgmeier (yellow card) 27'; Zakrzewski 58' (1:0)	Summary	66' (1:1) Derdiyok; 79' (1:2) Derdiyok; 88' (1:3) Derdiyok	Attendance: 5,050; Referee: (Switzerland) Guido Wildhaber

9 March 2008 Round 24	Basel	2–1	St. Gallen	St. Jakob-Park, Basel
16:00	Carlitos (yellow card) 13'; Eduardo 16' (1:0); Marque (yellow card) 18'; Carlitos 48' (2:0); Hodel (yellow card) 77'	Summary	(yellow card) 7' Muntwiler; (yellow card) 53' Gelabert; 64' (2:1) Schneider	Attendance: 23,491; Referee: (Switzerland) Cyril Zimmermann

16 March 2008 Round 25	Sion	4–2	Basel	Stade Tourbillon, Sion
16:00	Domínguez 11' (1:0); M'Futi (yellow card) 17'; Saborío 44' (2:1); Domínguez 66' (3:2); Reset 82' (4:2)	Summary	27' (1:1) Eduardo; 53' (2:2) Stocker; (yellow card) 63' Stocker	Attendance: 13,000; Referee: (Switzerland) René Rogalla

19 March 2008 Round 26	Basel	2–1	Grasshopper Club	St. Jakob-Park, Basel
19:45	Ergić 25' (1:0); Eduardo 36' (2:0); Ba (yellow card) 66'	Summary	(yellow card) 19' Feltscher; (yellow card) 42' Jakupović; 67' (2:1) Cabanas; (yellow card) 82' Colina	Attendance: 22,019; Referee: (Switzerland) Nikolaj Hänni

22 March 2008 Round 27	Basel	1–0	Luzern	St. Jakob-Park, Basel
17:45	Majstorović 45' (pen. 1:0); Costanzo (yellow card) 94'	Summary	(yellow card) 75' Diarra	Attendance: 20,331; Referee: (Switzerland) Daniel Wermelinger

29 March 2008 Round 28	Luzern	1–0	Basel	Stadion Allmend Luzern
17:45	Lustrinelli 62' (1:0)	Summary	(yellow card) 24' Stocker; (yellow card) 79' Zanni	Attendance: 11,623; Referee: (Switzerland) Bruno Grossen

2 April 2008 Round 29	Grasshopper Club	1–1	Basel	Hardturm, Zürich
18:45	Bobadilla (yellow card) 79'; Bobadilla 91' (1:1)	Summary	(yellow card) 60' Majstorović; (yellow card) 64' Marque; 70' (0:1) Derdiyok; (yellow card) 89' Huggel; (yellow card) 92' Streller	Attendance: 6,700; Referee: (Switzerland) Sascha Kever

13 April 2008 Round 30	Basel	1–1	Sion	St. Jakob-Park, Basel
16:00	Eduardo 6' (1:0); Marque (yellow card) 27'; Streller (yellow card) 31'; Huggel (yellow card) 74'	Summary	(yellow card) 28' Brellier; (yellow card) 52' Nwaneri; (yellow card) 62' Kali; 68' (1:1) Saborío; (yellow card) 89' Sarni	Attendance: 23,113; Referee: (Austria) Gerhard Grobelnik (ÖFB)

16 April 2008 Round 31	St. Gallen	1–4	Basel	Espenmoos, St. Gallen
19:45	Aquirre 32' (pen. 1:1); Callà (yellow card) 54'; Koubský (yellow card) 59'; Zé Vítor (yellow card) 62'	Summary	10' (0:1) Carlitos; 37' (1:2) Majstorović; (yellow card) 39' D. Degen; 43' (1:3) D. Degen; (yellow card) 77' Derdiyok; 90' (1:4) Perović	Attendance: 11,300; Referee: (Switzerland) Carlo Bertolini

19 April 2008 Round 32	Basel	3–1	Thun	St. Jakob-Park, Basel
17:45	Ergić 10' (1:0); Majstorović 17' (pen. 2:0); D. Degen (yellow card) 66'; Perović (yellow card) 67'; D. Degen 77' (3:1)	Summary	(yellow card) 16' Stulz; (yellow card) 27' Andrist; 38' (pen. 2:1) Scarione	Attendance: 19,437; Referee: (Switzerland) Stephan Studer

26 April 2008 Round 33	Aarau	2–2	Basel	Stadion Brügglifeld, Aarau
17:45	Rogério 50' (1:1); Sermeter 64' (pen. 2:1)	Summary	19' (0:1) Streller; (yellow card) 63' Costanzo; 70' (2:2) Ergić	Attendance: 7,900; Referee: (Switzerland) Jérôme Laperrière

2 May 2008 Round 34	Basel	4–0	Zürich	St. Jakob-Park, Basel
19:45	Streller 16' (1:0); Stocker 21' (2:0); Huggel (yellow card) 44'; Majstorović 50' (pen. 3:0); Majstorović (yellow card) 54'; Huggel 78'	Summary	(yellow card) 19' Stahel; (yellow card) 38' Tico; (yellow card) 46' Rochat; (yellow card) 53' Abdi	Attendance: 29,098; Referee: (Switzerland) Sascha Kever

6 May 2008 Round 35	Xamax	2–2	Basel	Stade de la Maladière, Neuchâtel
20:45	Rossi 20' (1:0); Rossi (yellow card) 22'; El Haimour (yellow card) 23'; Nuzzolo (yellow card) 38'; Coly 52' (2:0); Rak (yellow card) 76'	Summary	(yellow card) 10' Ba; (yellow card) 70' Zanni; 72' (2:1) Majstorović; (yellow card) 72' Majstorović; 90+1' (2:2) Ergić	Attendance: 8,454; Referee: (Switzerland) Stephan Studer

10 May 2008 Round 36	Basel	2–0	BSC Young Boys	St. Jakob-Park, Basel
20:15	Streller (yellow card) 16'; Stocker 19' (1:0); Streller 23' (2:0); Stocker (yellow card) 32'	Summary	(yellow card) 19' Ghezal; (yellow card) 60' Schwegler; (yellow card) 81' Regazzoni; (yellow card) 82' Zayatte; (yellow card) 83' Hochstrasser	Attendance: 38,015; Referee: (Switzerland) Massimo Busacca

==== League table ====
Pos	Team	Pld	W	D	L	GF	GA	GD	Pts	Qualification or relegation
1	Basel (C)	36	22	8	6	73	39	+34	74	Swiss champions and Swiss Cup winners Qualification to Champions League second qualifying round
2	Young Boys	36	21	7	8	82	49	+33	70	Qualification to UEFA Cup second qualifying round
3	Zürich	36	15	11	10	58	43	+15	56	Qualification to UEFA Cup second qualifying round
4	Grasshopper	36	15	9	12	57	49	+8	54	Qualification to Intertoto Cup second round
5	Aarau	36	11	14	11	47	48	−1	47	
6	Luzern	36	10	14	12	40	49	−9	44	
7	Sion	36	11	10	15	48	51	−3	43	
8	Neuchâtel Xamax	36	10	11	15	48	55	−7	41	
9	St. Gallen (R)	36	9	7	20	39	69	−30	34	Continue to relegation play-off
10	Thun (R)	36	6	8	22	30	70	−40	26	Relegation to Swiss Challenge League

Source: RSSSF
Rules for classification: 1) points; 2) goal difference; 3) number of goals scored.
(C) Champions; (R) Relegated

=== 2007–08 Swiss Cup ===
for main article, see 2007–08 Swiss Cup

16 September 2007 Round 1	FC Léchelles	0–9	Basel	Stade Universitaire Saint-Léonard, Fribourg
15:00		Summary	7' (0:1) Carlitos; 21' (0:2) Chipperfield; 32' (0:3) Ergić; 57' (0:4) D. Degen; 62' (0:5) Chipperfield; 64' (0:6) Carlitos; 66' (0:7) Eduardo; 69' (0:8) Eduardo; (yellow card) 74' Cabral; 75' (0:9) Nakata	Attendance: 3,549; Referee: (Switzerland) Guido Wildhaber

20 October 2007 Round 2	SC Binningen	1–6	Basel	Spiegelfeld, Binningen
15:00	Tobias Fumagalli 35' (1:2)	Summary	7' (0:1) Ergić; 23' (0:2) Eduardo; 39' (1:3) Carlitos; 47' (1:4) Ergić; 72' (1:5) D. Degen; 82' (1:6) Huggel	Attendance: 6,450; Referee: (Switzerland) Claudio Circhetta

25 November 2007 Round 3	Grasshopper Club	0–1	Basel	Letzigrund, Zürich
14:30	Rinaldo (yellow card) 19'	Summary	(yellow card) 2' Zanni; (yellow card) 56' D. Degen; (yellow card) 58' Streller; (yellow card) 65' Eduardo; (yellow card) 66' Carlitos; 90' (pen. 0:1) Majstorović	Attendance: 8,400; Referee: (Switzerland) Jérôme Laperrière

15 December 2007 Quarterfinal	Basel	2–0	Stade Nyonnais	St. Jakob-Park, Basel
19:30	Derdiyok 53' (1:0); Carlitos (yellow card) 83'; Derdiyok 90' (2:0)	Summary	(yellow card) 39' Germanier; (yellow card) 52' Roux	Attendance: 8,430; Referee: (Switzerland) Guido Wildhaber

27 February 2008 Semifinal	Basel	1–0	Thun	St. Jakob-Park, Basel
20:15	Lokvenc 12' (1:0); D. Degen (yellow card) 91'	Summary	(yellow card) 22' Zakrzewski; (yellow card) 33' Gavatorta; (yellow card) 73' Burgmeier	Attendance: 10,759; Referee: (Switzerland) René Rogalla

6 April 2008 Final	AC Bellinzona	1–4	Basel	St. Jakob-Park, Basel
15:45	Carbone (yellow card) 20'; Pouga 58' (1:1)	Summary	30' (0:1) Derdiyok; 62' (1:2) Marque Majstorović; 64' (1:3) Streller; 66' (1:5) Huggel	Attendance: 33,000; Referee: (Switzerland) Cyril Zimmermann (Münsingen)

=== 2007–08 UEFA Cup ===
For more information, see 2007–08 UEFA Cup

==== Second qualifying round ====
For more information, see 2007–08 UEFA Cup qualifying rounds

16 August 2007 First leg	Basel (Switzerland)	2–1	(Austria) SV Mattersburg	St. Jakob-Park, Basel
20:15 CET	Ergić 23'; Caicedo 53'; Carlitos (yellow card) 63'	UEFA summary FCB summary	(yellow card) 8' (yellow-red card) 17' Atan; 20' (o.g.) Nakata; (yellow card) 35' Sedloski; (yellow card) 78' Kovrig	Attendance: 9,203; Referee: (Sweden) Martin Ingvarsson (Swedish Football Association)

30 August 2007 Second leg	SV Mattersburg (Austria)	0–4	(Switzerland) Basel	Pappelstadion, Mattersburg
18:15 CET	Pauschenwein (yellow card) 12'; Pöllhuber (yellow card) 64'; Bürger (yellow card) 74'; Naumoski (yellow card) 82'	UEFA summary FCB summary	(yellow card) 10' Chipperfield; (yellow card) 17' Huggel; 22' Caicedo; (yellow card) 28' Caicedo; 36' Ergić; 41' Streller; 53' Carlitos	Attendance: 4,600; Referee: (Turkey) Selçuk Dereli (Turkish Football Federation)

Basel win 6–1 on aggregate

==== First round ====
20 September 2007 1st Leg	Sarajevo (Bosnia and Herzegovina)	1–2	(Switzerland) Basel	Asim Ferhatović Hase Stadium, Sarajevo
20:00	Bašić (yellow card) 32'; Repuh (yellow card) 62'; Šaraba (yellow card) 86'; Milošević 90+3'	UEFA summary FCB summary	11' Carlitos; 63' Ergić	Attendance: 6,000; Referee: (Latvia) Romāns Lajuks (Latvian Football Federation)

4 October 2007 2nd leg	Basel (Switzerland)	6–0	(Bosnia and Herzegovina) Sarajevo	St. Jakob-Park, Basel
19:30	Carlitos 8'; Carlitos 9'; Streller 19'; Streller 29'; Huggel 75'; Caicedo 90+1'	UEFA summary FCB summary	(yellow card) 21' Bučan; (yellow card) 66' Kurto	Attendance: 15,124; Referee: (Portugal) Paulo Costa (Portuguese Football Federation)

==== Group stage ====
===== Group D =====
25 October 2007 Round 1	Basel (Switzerland)	1–0	(France) Rennes	St. Jakob-Park, Basel
20:45	Streller 55' (1:0)	UEFA summary FCB summary	(yellow card) 38' Briand; (yellow card) 44' Cyril Jeunechamp	Attendance: 11,407; Referee: (Italy) Nicola Rizzoli (Italian Football Federation)

8 November 2007 Round 2	Dinamo Zagreb (Croatia)	0–0	(Switzerland) Basel	Maksimir Stadium, Zagreb
20:15		UEFA summary FCB summary		Attendance: 28,000; Referee: (Belgium) Serge Gumienny (Royal Belgian Football Association)
Note: Fair game, no yellow cards

5 December 2007 Round 4	Basel (Switzerland)	1–0	(Norway) Brann	St. Jakob-Park, Basel
20:45	D. Degen (yellow card) 76'; Carlitos 40' (1:0)	UEFA summary FCB summary	(yellow card) 20' Bjarnason; (yellow card) 76' Vaagan Moen; (yellow card) 77' Solli	Attendance: 13,731; Referee: (Russia) Igor Egorov (Russian Football Union)

20 December 2007 Round 5	Hamburger SV (Germany)	1–1	(Switzerland) Basel	HSH Nordbank Arena, Hamburg
20:45	Kompany (yellow card) 31'; Olić 73' (1:1)	UEFA summary FCB summary	(yellow card) 20' (red card) 49' Zanni; (yellow card) 43' Huggel; 58' (0:1) Ergić; (yellow card) 88' Costanzo	Attendance: 48,917; Referee: (Denmark) Nicolai Vollquartz (Danish Football Association)

===== Final table =====
Team	Pld	W	D	L	GF	GA	GD	Pts	Qualification
(Germany) Hamburg	4	3	1	0	7	1	+6	10	Advance to Round of 32
(Switzerland) Basel	4	2	2	0	3	1	+2	8	Advance to Round of 32
(Norway) Brann	4	1	1	2	3	4	−1	4	Advance to Round of 32
(Croatia) Dinamo Zagreb	4	0	2	2	2	5	−3	2	
(France) Rennes	4	0	2	2	2	6	−4	2	

==== Knockout stage ====
13 February 2008 1st Leg	Sporting CP (Portugal)	2–0	(Switzerland) Basel	Estádio José Alvalade, Lisbon
21:45	Vukčević 8' (1:0); Vukčević 58' (2:0)	UEFA summary FCB summary	(yellow card) 29' Carlitos	Attendance: 16,639; Referee: Kevin Blom (Netherlands)

21 February 2008 2nd Leg	Basel (Switzerland)	0–3	(Portugal) Sporting CP	St. Jakob-Park, Basel
21:00		UEFA summary FCB summary	Pereirinha 2' (0:1); Liédson 41' (0:2); Liédson 51' (0:3); (yellow card) 80' Abel	Attendance: 16,360; Referee: Tommy Skjerven (Norway)

Sporting won 5–0 on aggregate.

=== Overall ===
Basel participated in the following major competitions: the Swiss Super League, the Swiss Cup and the UEFA Cup.

Competition	Started round	Final position / round	First match	Last match
Swiss Super League	—	Winner	22 July 2007	10 May 2008
Swiss Cup	Round of 64	Winner	16 September 2007	6 April 2008
UEFA Cup	Second qualifying round	Round of 32	16 August 2007	21 February 2008

Source: Competitions

== Statistics ==
=== Total goalscorers ===
Updated to games played 10 May 2008

All Game Scorer	Goals
(Switzerland) Marco Streller	17
(Portugal) Carlitos	15
(Serbia) Ivan Ergić	13
(Sweden) Daniel Majstorović	12
(Brazil) Eduardo	11
(Switzerland) Eren Derdiyok	10
(Australia) Scott Chipperfield	9
(Ecuador) Felipe Caicedo	7
(Switzerland) Benjamin Huggel	6
(Switzerland) David Degen	5
(Switzerland) Valentin Stocker	3
(Serbia) Marko Perović	2
(Japan) Kōji Nakata	2
(Czech Republic) Vratislav Lokvenc	1
Total goals scored	113

=== Swiss Super League goalscorers/assists ===
Updated to games played 10 May 2008

League Scorer	Goals
(Switzerland) Marco Streller	12
(Sweden) Daniel Majstorović	10
(Brazil) Eduardo	8
(Switzerland) Eren Derdiyok	7
(Australia) Scott Chipperfield	7
(Portugal) Carlitos	7
(Serbia) Ivan Ergić	6
(Ecuador) Felipe Caicedo	4
(Switzerland) Valentin Stocker	3
(Switzerland) David Degen	3
(Switzerland) Benjamin Huggel	3
(Serbia) Marko Perović	2
(Japan) Kōji Nakata	1
Total goals scored	73

Name	League Assists
(Serbia) Ivan Ergić	12
(Portugal) Carlitos	11
(Switzerland) Marco Streller	7
(Switzerland) David Degen	7
(Switzerland) Eren Derdiyok	5
(Australia) Scott Chipperfield	5
(Ecuador) Felipe Caicedo	3
(Brazil) Eduardo	3
(Switzerland) Valentin Stocker	2
(Switzerland) Benjamin Huggel	2
(Switzerland) Reto Zanni	2
(Sweden) Daniel Majstorović	1
(Switzerland) Cabral	1
(Serbia) Marko Perović	1
(Czech Republic) Vratislav Lokvenc	1
Total Assist Made	63

=== Swiss Cup goalscorers ===
Updated to games played 6 April 2008

Cup Scorer	Goals
(Brazil) Eduardo	3
(Switzerland) Eren Derdiyok	3
(Portugal) Carlitos	3
(Serbia) Ivan Ergić	3
(Sweden) Daniel Majstorović	2
(Australia) Scott Chipperfield	2
(Switzerland) David Degen	2
(Switzerland) Benjamin Huggel	2
(Switzerland) Marco Streller	1
(Japan) Kōji Nakata	1
(Czech Republic) Vratislav Lokvenc	1
Total goals scored	23

=== European goalscorers ===
Updated to games played 21 February 2008

European Scorer	Goals
(Portugal) Carlitos	5
(Switzerland) Marco Streller	4
(Serbia) Ivan Ergić	4
(Ecuador) Felipe Caicedo	3
(Switzerland) Benjamin Huggel	1
Total goals scored	17

== Honours and awards ==
- Swiss League Champions 2007–08
- Swiss Cup Champions 2007–08
- Swiss Youngster of the Year 2007/08 – Eren Derdiyok
- Swiss Coach of the Year 2007/08 – Christian Gross

== See also ==
- History of FC Basel
- List of FC Basel players
- List of FC Basel seasons

== Sources ==
- Rotblau: Jahrbuch Saison 2017/2018. Publisher: FC Basel Marketing AG. ISBN 978-3-7245-2189-1
- Die ersten 125 Jahre. Publisher: Josef Zindel im Friedrich Reinhardt Verlag, Basel. ISBN 978-3-7245-2305-5
- FCB squad on homepage: Verein "Basler Fussballarchiv" homepage
