= Benjamin Huggel =

Swiss footballer (born 1977)

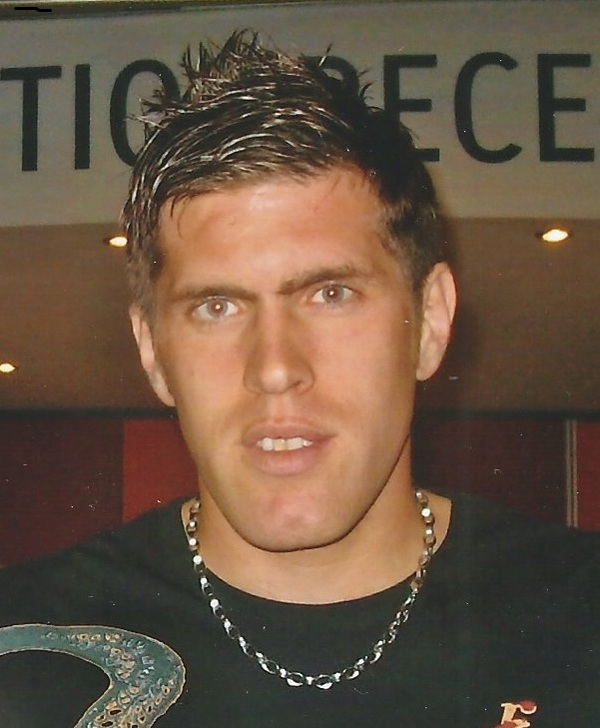

Personal information
- Date of birth: 7 July 1977 (age 49)
- Place of birth: Dornach, Switzerland
- Height: 1.90 m (6 ft 3 in)
- Position: Defensive midfielder

Youth career
- 1987–1996: FC Münchenstein
- 1996–1998: FC Arlesheim

Senior career*
Years	Team	Apps	(Gls)
1998–2005	Basel	153	(31)
2005–2007	Eintracht Frankfurt	53	(1)
2007–2012	Basel	144	(31)
Total		350	(63)

International career
2003–2010	Switzerland	41	(2)
- * Club domestic league appearances and goals

Benjamin "Beni" Huggel (born 7 July 1977) is a Swiss former footballer who played as a defensive midfielder for FC Basel in the Swiss Super League and for Eintracht Frankfurt in the Bundesliga.

He won a total of twelve titles with Basel, seven League Championships and five Swiss Cup titles. He played in four Swiss Cup Finals (he missed one due to an injury) and scored a goal in each Final. For Frankfurt he played in the 2006 DFB-Pokal Final, but the team finished as runner-up. Huggel played 41 times as a Swiss international scoring two goals, the second of which being the 1000th goal in the history of the Swiss national team. He was well known because of his height, his strength and for being a fearless fighter in the centre of the pitch. He now works for Basel as assistant trainer for the U-21 team.

== Early life ==
Born in Dornach, Huggel grew up and went to School in suburban Münchenstein, ten minutes from Basel and close to the borders of France and Germany. He has a younger brother. Their parents are both teachers and his mother is a well known local politician. Huggel completed his apprenticeship as Landscape Gardener before he became professional footballer.

== Club career ==
=== Early years and Basel ===
Huggel began his youth football with local club FC Münchenstein and came through the ranks between 1987 and 1996. He was loaned out to FC Arlesheim for two years (the price of which was a match ball), before completing his move to FC Basel in 1998. In his first year in Basel, under Manager Guy Mathez, he was solely a reserve player. Huggel made his debut for Basel on 6 December 1998, as he was transferred in during the 65th minute, in the 2–1 away win in the Wankdorf Stadium against Young Boys. In the 1998–99 season he made just three short appearances as substitute in the first team. But during the following year in the 1999–2000 Nationalliga A, under new Manager Christian Gross, he advanced into the starting team and played 34 of the 36 league games, scoring four goals. He scored his first goal for the team on 15 August 1999 as Basel won 2–0 against Luzern at home in the Schützenmatte Stadion. Huggel enjoyed his best campaign in 2000–01 when he scored eight goals in 29 league games from the centre of midfield.

Huggel was part of the side that won the Double in the year 2002. But he missed the Cup Final due to an injury. He first rose to international prominence with his displays for FC Basel during their Champions League run in the 2002–03 season. A series of injuries had previously badly hampered his progress and the midfielder struggled in the face of stiff competition to win his way back into the side. However, he did play as Basel knocked Liverpool out of the Champions League in 2002. Basel finished second in the Swiss Super League that season and won the Swiss Cup after beating Neuchâtel Xamax 6–0 in the final, thus Huggel won his second Cup title. Huggel scored the first goal in that final.

During the following year, Huggel had another successful season, scoring eight times in 32 games during the 2003–04 League season, as Basel won the Swiss title back from Grasshopper Club Zürich. Another year later Huggel won his third Championship title at the end of the 2004–05 season.

=== Eintracht Frankfurt ===
In 2005, Huggel transferred to the newly promoted German club Eintracht Frankfurt, in the Bundesliga. In that season he played 28 Bundesliga games and, with the team, he reached the DFB-Pokal Final in the Olympic Stadium (Berlin) against Bayern Munich, but this ended in a 0–1 defeat. On 5 May 2007, he scored his first (and only) Bundesliga goal, in his 51st League game for Frankfurt, in the match against Alemannia Aachen. In June 2007, Eintracht announced that Huggel was transferred back to his home club Basel, for an estimated fee of €400,000.

=== Return to Basel ===
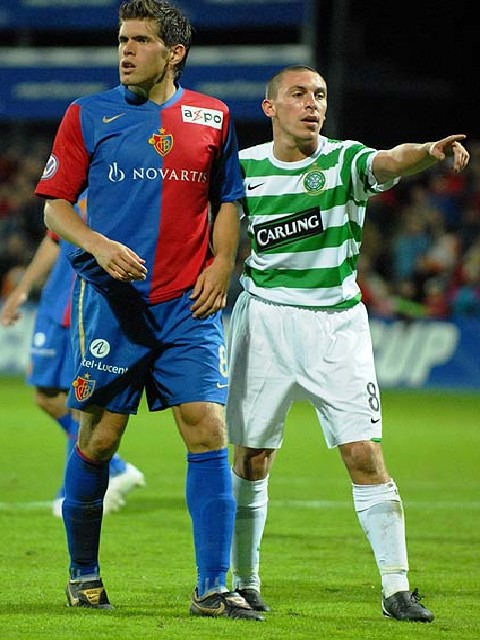
Huggel (left) in action for Basel against Celtic in the Uhrencup in July 2007.

Following Huggels return to Basel for the 2007–08 season, he became a constant fixture in the centre of midfield in their domestic and European encounters. That year he won the Swiss Super League for the fourth time and the Swiss Cup for a third. In the 2008 cup final on 6 April 2008, he scored Basel's fourth goal as they beat AC Bellinzona 4–1.

During Basel's 2008–09 season, Huggel showed his goal scoring qualities. Basel played their opening game of the season in Bern on 18 July 2008 against BSC Young Boys, which they won 2–1. Basel's goals were scored by Marko Perović and Benjamin Huggel. Basel entered the Champions League in the Second Qualifying Round and were drawn against IFK Göteborg of the Allsvenskan. The first leg was on 30 July 2008 at Ullevi and finished 1–1. Huggel scored the Basel goal. The second leg was played on 6 August at St. Jakob-Park. Basel came from behind twice to win 4–2, Huggel scored the equaliser to 1–1, and Basel qualified for the UEFA Champions League Group Stages against FC Barcelona, FC Shakhtar Donetsk and Sporting Clube de Portugal. In the League. despite remaining in first or second position for most of the season, Basel finished only in third position behind FC Zürich and Young Boys. Huggel scored ten league goals that season, only second behind Scott Chipperfield, who scored 12 times.

Thorsten Fink was appointed as Basel's new manager on 9 June 2009. Basel entered the Europa League in the second qualifying round playing against Andorrans Santa Colma, against KR Reykjavík of Iceland in the third round, against FK Baku of Azerbaijan in the play-offs and they qualified for the Europa League group stage. FCB were then drawn into Group E alongside A.S. Roma (Serie A), Fulham (Premier League) and CSKA Sofia (Bulgarian A Professional Football Group). But they only finishing in third place. Huggel played all twelve Europa League matches. In domestic affairs Basel swept the board. Despite a poor start to the season they came back to win the title on the last day of the season in the match against favourites BSC Young Boys at the Stade de Suisse. Huggel played 32 League matches, scoring eleven goals. At the end of Basel's 2009–10 season Huggel also won the Swiss Cup and yet again he scored a goal in the cup final as they beat Lausanne-Sport 6–0. At the end of the season, the goal that Huggel scored in the 2–2 away draw on 28 October 2009 against Zürich was voted "Best European Goal of the Season 2009–2010" on guardian.co.uk, where it was chosen by a massive lot of over 84%.

Huggel won his sixth league championship in 2011, playing 26 games and scoring three goals. Basel ended the 2010–11 Swiss Super League only one point ahead of Zürich winning the last game of the season 3–0 against Luzern in front of 37,500 spectators in the sold-out St. Jakob-Park Stadium. Huggel missed that game due to a one match ban because he received his fourth yellow card of the season during the penultimate game away to FC St. Gallen.

The following season turned out to be his last as professional footballer as he announced his retirement on 30 March 2012. The 2010–11 season was Basel's most successful season in the club's history. Huggel won his fourth Double, the League Championship title and the Swiss Cup with the club. He played 23 league games scoring four goals. He played four of the six cup games, scoring an away goal against FC Schötz in the second round and a goal in the final. The final was played against Luzern in the Stade de Suisse, Bern, and this goal meant that had scored a goal in each of the four Swiss Cup finals that he had played in. The game was drawn 1–1, but Basel won the title in a penalty shoot-out.

Basel also played very impressive away games in the 2011–12 UEFA Champions League and Huggel scored his first Champions League goal on 2 November 2011, the equaliser, during a group stage match away to Benfica. Thus Basel remained undefeated in the away games, winning against Oțelul Galați and drawing against Manchester United and Benfica and they qualified for the knockout phase. In the Round of 16 they were drawn against Bayern Munich. Despite a 1–0 home win they lost the second leg in the Allianz Arena and were knocked out.

At the end of their 2011–12 season Huggel retired from his active career and on 1 July 2012 became assistant to coach Carlos Bernegger of the U-21 team. Huggel's last professional match came on 23 May 2012 when he was substituted out in the 73rd minute. Between the years 1998 to 2005 and again from 2007 to 2012 Huggel played a total of 536 games for Basel scoring a total of 102 goals. 297 of these games were in the Swiss Super League, 30 in the Swiss Cup, 74 in the European competitions (Champions League, Europa League and UIC) and 135 were friendly games. He scored 62 goals in the domestic league, 9 in the cup, 8 in the European competitions and the other 23 were scored during the test games. Huggel won the Swiss championship seven times and the cup five times.

== International career ==
Huggel had a tough introduction to international football on 20 August 2003 as the Swiss lost 2–0 against France. He also appeared in Switzerland's final two matches during the Euro 2004 qualification campaign – a 4–1 defeat against Russia and 2–0 victory over the Republic of Ireland.

He appeared in all three of Switzerland's Euro 2004 matches. However, he was unable to prevent the Swiss having a disappointing tournament – they were eliminated at the group stage following defeats to France and England and a draw with Croatia.

However, Huggel did not start in any Switzerland's qualifying games for the 2006 World Cup. He also missed the tournament after receiving a six-game ban for kicking a Turkish coach Mehmet Özdilek, after his nation's play-off victory over Turkey. The FIFA Appeal Committee later reduced the ban to four matches. Huggel was included in the squad to play at Euro 2008, but did not play a game.

Huggel's second national goal was also the 1000th goal in the history of the Swiss national team. He scored it, a header from a set piece, on 10 October 2009 against Luxembourg during the 3–0 away win in the 2010 World Cup qualifier. Huggel was in the squad for the 2010 FIFA World Cup, he was in the starting eleven in all three games. But after they were eliminated during the Group Stage, he announced his international retirement. Huggel played 41 games for the national team, in which he scored two goals and was yellow carded only four times.

== Coaching career ==
At the end of the 2011–2012 season Huggel retired from active professional football and started working as assistant manager for the Basel U-21 team on 1 July 2012. He was also eligible to play for the U-21 team and he made his debut for the team on 8 September 2012 in the 3–1 away win against Young Fellows Juventus. He also worked as a youth coach at the club, before becoming youth coach at FC Luzern in 2014. In May 2015, he was appointed head coach of FC Black Stars Basel, before being dismissed against in February 2016.

== Career statistics ==
=== International ===
Appearances and goals by national team and year
National team	Year	Apps	Goals
Switzerland	2003	3	0
Switzerland	2004	9	0
Switzerland	2005	4	0
Switzerland	2006	2	0
Switzerland	2007	4	0
Switzerland	2008	7	0
Switzerland	2009	7	2
Switzerland	2010	5	0
Total		41	2

Scores and results lists Switzerland's goal tally first.

International goals scored by Benjamin Huggel
No.	Date	Venue	Opponent	Score	Result	Competition
1	11 February 2009	Stade de Genève, Geneva, Switzerland	Bulgaria	1–1	1–1	Friendly
2	10 October 2009	Stade Josy Barthel, Luxembourg City, Luxembourg	Luxembourg	3–0	3–0	2010 FIFA World Cup qualification

== Honours ==
Basel

- Swiss Super League: 2001–02, 2003–04, 2004–05, 2007–08, 2009–10, 2010–11, 2011–12
- Swiss Cup: 2001–02, 2002–03, 2007–08, 2009–10, 2011–12

Eintracht Frankfurt

- DFB-Pokal: Runner-up 2005–06

Individual

- Credit Suisse Player of the Year: 2010
- Guardian European Goal of the Season: 2009–10
