= Sprunger =

Sprunger is a surname. Notable people with the surname include:

- Ellen Sprunger (born 1986), Swiss heptathlete, older sister of Léa
- Julien Sprunger (born 1986), Swiss ice hockey player
- Léa Sprunger (born 1990), Swiss heptathlete turned sprinter, youner sister of Ellen
- Michel Sprunger (born 1985), Swiss footballer

== See also ==
- Springer (surname)
