= Ronny Hodel =

Swiss footballer (born 1982)

Personal information
- Full name: Ronny Hodel
- Date of birth: 27 October 1982 (age 44)
- Place of birth: Horw, Switzerland
- Height: 1.82 m (6 ft 0 in)
- Position: Left-back

Youth career
- 1990–2000: FC Luzern

Senior career*
Years	Team	Apps	(Gls)
2000–2005	FC Luzern	110	(2)
2005–2007	Young Boys	59	(0)
2007–2009	FC Basel	25	(0)
2009–2010	Ventspils	5	(0)
2010	SC Cham	24	(0)

International career
2002	Switzerland U-20	1	(0)
2003–2004	Switzerland U-21	3	(0)
- * Club domestic league appearances and goals

Ronny Hodel (born 27 October 1982) is a Swiss former professional footballer who played as a left-back. He started out with local club FC Luzern in 2000 before moving on to BSC Young Boys in 2005. He played there for two years until he was signed by FC Basel at the end of the 2006/07 season. He was considered one of the best left-backs in Switzerland despite never making his full international debut.

== Football career ==
Born in Horw, Lucerne, Hodel played his youth football with local club Luzern coming through the ranks. In summer 2000 he advanced from their U-21 team and joined their first team under head coach Andy Egli. In his second season with the team he became a regular player in the starting eleven. After the season 2002–03 Luzern suffered relegation. Hodel stayed with the team another two seasons. Then he felt he had to move to a bigger club if he wanted to improve as a footballer and he made this known. In 2005 Luzern advanced to the final of the Swiss Cup, but they lost the game 3–1. Hodel won the runners-up medal.

BSC Young Boys signed him at the start of the 2005/06 season where he quickly broke into first team. He started to push for a place in the international set-up and was tipped to be included in the Swiss squad for the 2006 FIFA World Cup in Germany but left-backs Christoph Spycher and Ludovic Magnin were chosen instead. Hodel remains uncapped at full international stage but has one U-20 and three U-21 caps.

On 13 June 2007 FC Basel announced that they had signed Hodel on a three-year contract. He was given the No.3 shirt. He is left-footed and was used primarily in the left corridor as a defender or midfielder. He joined Basel's first team for their 2007–08 season under head coach Christian Gross. After playing in seven test games Hodel played his domestic league debut for the club in the away game in the Stadion Wankdorf on 5 August as Basel were defeated 1–5 against Hodel's ex-club Young Boys. At the end of the 2007–08 season he won the Double with the club. They won the League Championship title with four points advantage over second placed Young Boys. In the Swiss Cup via FC Léchelles, SC Binningen, Grasshopper Club, Stade Nyonnais and in the semi-final Thun, Basel advanced to the final, and winning this 4–1 against AC Bellinzona they won the competition. Hodel played in four of the six cup matches but not in the final.

To the beginning of the 2008–09 season he was member of the Basel team that won the Uhrencup. They beat Legia Warsaw 6–1 and played a 2–2 draw with Borussia Dortmund to end the table on top slot above Dortmund and Luzern. But as the season progressed Hodel became increasingly less playing time and in the second half of the season he was not considered for play at all, which also had to do with a knee injury. On 18 June 2009, he was released by Basel after newly appointed manager Thorsten Fink decided not to offer him a new contract.

During his time with the club, Hodel played a total of 62 games for Basel without scoring a goal. 25 of these games were in the Swiss Super League, four in the Swiss Cup, six in the UEFA competitions (Champions League and Europa League) and 27 were friendly games.

He then signed for FK Ventspils of the Latvian Higher League. In February 2010 he left Ventspils.

He had expected to sign for Servette FC from Switzerland but during the medical tests an anomaly in his knee was found and it was not known whether he would be able to continue his career or not. Hodel joined SC Cham, who at that time played in the Promotion League, the third tier of Swiss football. However, due to continuous knee problems, at the end of 2010 he ended his professional career.

== Honours ==
FC Luzern

- Swiss Cup runner-up: 2005

Basel

- Swiss Super League: 2008
- Swiss Cup: 2008
- Uhren Cup: 2008

== Sources ==
- Die ersten 125 Jahre. Publisher: Josef Zindel im Friedrich Reinhardt Verlag, Basel. ISBN 978-3-7245-2305-5
- Verein "Basler Fussballarchiv" Homepage
