= Beg Ferati =

Swiss footballer (born 1986)

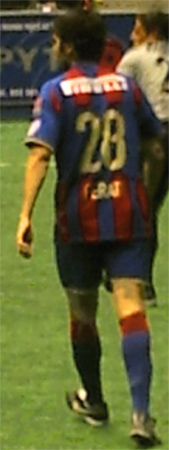
- Ferati in 2009

Personal information
- Date of birth: 10 November 1986 (age 40)
- Place of birth: Pristina, SFR Yugoslavia
- Height: 1.86 m (6 ft 1 in)
- Position: Centre-back

Youth career
- 1996–2001: FC Pratteln
- 2001–2005: Concordia

Senior career*
Years	Team	Apps	(Gls)
2005–2006	→ FC Basel U-21 (loan)	28	(0)
2006–2007	FC Concordia Basel	45	(1)
2008–2011	FC Basel	56	(0)
2011–2013	SC Freiburg	6	(0)
2013	→ FC Winterthur (loan)	17	(2)
2013–2018	Sion	31	(0)
2015	→ FC Biel-Bienne (loan)	12	(0)
2017	→ Chiasso (loan)	2	(0)
Total		197	(3)

International career
2006–2008	Switzerland U-21	12	(1)
2011	Switzerland	1	(0)
- * Club domestic league appearances and goals

Beg Ferati (born 10 November 1986) is a Swiss former professional footballer who played as a centre-back.

== Club career ==
Born in Pristina, Ferati moved with his family to Pratteln, Switzerland, while he was still a child. He started his children's football with local club FC Pratteln and moved to the youth department of FC Concordia Basel in summer 2001. In summer 2005 Concordia loaned Ferati out to FC Basel to play in their U-21 team, with team coach Heinz Hermann, in the third tier of Swiss football. Ferati played 28 games with Basel's reserve squad during his loan period and afterwards he returned to Concordia, who at that time played in the Challenge League. The two clubs signed an agreement and Basel secured half the transfer rights of the defensive full back, with an option of a definitive take over. Ferati played for Concordia for one and a half years.

FC Basel took their option and on 1 January 2008 took over Ferati on a permanent basis. After playing in five test games, Ferati played his domestic league debut for the club in the home game in the St. Jakob-Park on 9 February 2008 as Basel won 3–0 against Xamax. But played only five league games during that season. At the end of the 2007–08 season he won the League Championship title with four points advantage over second placed Young Boys.

To the beginning of the 2008–09 season Ferati was member of the Basel team that won the Uhrencup. They beat Legia Warsaw 6–1, Ferati played in that match, and played a 2–2 draw with Borussia Dortmund, Ferati was on the bench, to end the table on top slot above Dortmund and Luzern. Basel joined the 2008–09 UEFA Champions League in the second qualifying round and with an aggregate score of 5–3 they eliminated IFK Göteborg. In the next round they played against Vitória de Guimarães. The first leg ended in a goalless draw, but with a 2–1 win in the second leg they eliminated Vitória and advanced to the group stage. Here Basel were matched with Barcelona, Sporting CP and Shakhtar Donetsk. Ferati was surprisingly in the starting eleven in their 2–0 defeat to Sporting Lisbon at the Estádio José Alvalade as a replacement for the injured François Marque on 1 October 2008 and despite the defeat, played as a first team regular from then on. He received very good critiques for the UEFA Champions League Group C match on 4 November 2008 in Camp Nou in the 1–1 draw against FC Barcelona. However, the team ended the group in last position winning just one point after their 1–1 draw in Camp Nou.

At the end of the 2008–09 Super League season Basel were third in the league table, seven points behind new champions Zürich and one adrift of runners-up Young Boys. In the 2008–09 Swiss Cup Basel advanced via Schötz, Bulle, Thun and Zurich to the semi-finals. But here they were stopped by YB. After a goalless 90 minutes and extra time, YB decided the penalty shoot-out 3–2 and advanced to the final to become runners-up, as Sion became cup winners.

Basel joined the 2009–10 UEFA Europa League in the second qualifying round. Basel advanced to the group stage, in which despite winning three of the six games the ended in third position and were eliminated. They finished four points behind group winners Roma and one behind Fulham, against whom they lost 3–2 in the last game of the stage.

On 9 August 2009, Ferati and teammate Franco Costanzo were involved in a scuffle after a 1–1 with FC Zürich. The pair began arguing on the pitch, and then Ferati shoved Costanzo who responded by pulling Ferati's hair. Other players then pulled them apart before the situation escalated. At the end of the 2009–10 season he won the Double with his club. They won the League Championship title with 3 points advantage over second placed Young Boys. In the Swiss Cup via SC Cham, FC Le Mont, Zürich, FC Biel-Bienne and in the semi-final SC Kriens, Basel advanced to the final, and winning this 6–0 against Lausanne-Sport they won the competition.

Basel started in the 2010–11 UEFA Champions League third qualifying round and advanced to the group stage but ended the group in third position. Therefore, they dropped to the 2010–11 Europa League knockout phase, but here they were eliminated by Spartak Moscow due to a last minute goal against them. Ferati played in six of the ten Champions League matches. With Basel, Ferati won the Swiss championship for the third time at the end of the 2010–11 season, topping the table just one point clear of rivals Zürich.

As early as in January 2011 it was announced that Ferati would leave FCB at the end of the season and would transfer to Germany. During his time with Basel's first team, Ferati played a total of 147 games for Basel scoring two goals. 56 of these games were in the Swiss Super League, 11 in the Swiss Cup, 13 in the UEFA competitions (Champions League and Europa League) and 67 were friendly games. He scored his two goals during the test games.

On 1 July 2011, Ferati joined SC Freiburg of the German Bundesliga on a three-year contract. On 1 February 2013, Freiburg loaned out Ferati until the end of the season to the Swiss Challenge League-Club FC Winterthur.

On 19 June 2013 it was announced that Ferati had signed a three-year contract with Sion. In his first season he was a regular starter and played 31 of the 36 games. However, at the beginning of his second season with Sion, Ferati became ill with glandular fever. The recovery took a long time and afterwards he never returned to form again, it wasn't even good enough for Sion's second team. On 6 August 2015 it was announced that Sion loaned Ferati to Biel-Bienne. Following the loan he returned to Sion, but his situation had not altered. In February 2017 Ferati was loaned to Chiasso, but the contract was ended prematurely.

Ferati retired from professional football and from summer 2018 he was listed as a player of FC Pratteln in the 2. Liga (regional), sixth tier of Swiss football.

== International career ==
Ferati was capped twelve times by the Switzerland under-21 national team, scoring once. He made his senior debut against Liechtenstein on 10 August 2011 coming on as a second-half substitute in the 63rd minute.

== Honours ==
Basel

- Swiss Super League: 2007–08, 2009–10, 2010–11
- Swiss Cup: 2007–08, 2009–10
- Uhren Cup: 2008

== Sources ==
- Die ersten 125 Jahre. Publisher: Josef Zindel im Friedrich Reinhardt Verlag, Basel. ISBN 978-3-7245-2305-5
- Verein "Basler Fussballarchiv" Homepage
