= Roberto Merino (footballer) =

Peruvian footballer (born 1982)

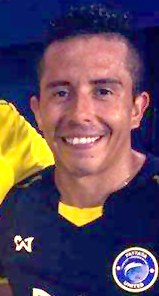

Personal information
- Full name: Roberto Merino Ramírez
- Date of birth: 19 May 1982 (age 44)
- Place of birth: Chiclayo, Peru
- Height: 1.67 m (5 ft 6 in)
- Position: Attacking midfielder

Youth career
- 1997–1998: Barcelona
- 1998–2000: Mallorca

Senior career*
Years	Team	Apps	(Gls)
2000–2002	Mallorca B	42	(2)
2003–2004	Málaga B	55	(8)
2004–2005	Servette	12	(3)
2005	Ciudad Murcia	8	(0)
2005–2006	Akratitos	8	(0)
2006–2008	Atromitos	42	(8)
2008–2011	Salernitana	47	(5)
2011	→ Al-Nasr (loan)	3	(0)
2011	Unión Comercio	8	(3)
2011	Juan Aurich	7	(0)
2012	Nocerina	29	(8)
2013	Deportes Tolima	8	(2)
2013–2014	Juan Aurich	12	(3)
2014	UTC	10	(1)
2015	Pattaya United	11	(2)
2015–2016	Unión Comercio	14	(3)
2016	Torres	2	(0)
2019	Puteolana 1902	0	(0)
2019	Spoleto		
2019	Sora		

International career
2000–2001	Spain U18	9	(3)
2009	Peru	1	(0)
- * Club domestic league appearances and goals as of 26 March 2017

Roberto Merino Ramírez (born 19 May 1982) is a Peruvian former professional footballer who played as an attacking midfielder.

He also holds Spanish citizenship, due to the many years spent in the country.

== Club career ==
Having moved to Spain in his teens after being born in Chiclayo, Lambayeque Region, Merino played youth football with FC Barcelona (only one year) and RCD Mallorca. He made his senior debuts with the latter's reserves, in Segunda División B.

In January 2003, Merino joined Atlético Malagueño, being an important midfielder element as Málaga CF's B-team retained their newly acquired status in Segunda División, with the player having contributed with 20 games and five goals to the promotion (play-offs included). Subsequently, he moved to Switzerland and signed with Servette FC but, with the club facing bankruptcy, left in the following transfer window to Ciudad de Murcia – also in Spain's second level – alongside teammate João Paulo Daniel.

Merino was signed by Atromitos in January 2006, from fellow Super League Greece side Akratitos. In February 2009, after two full seasons and two halves, he changed teams (and countries) again, joining U.S. Salernitana 1919 in Italy.

On 8 January 2011, Merino signed with Al-Nasr SC of the Kuwait Premier League, on loan from Salernitana. Less than one month after, however, he left the Asian club; according to the player, he decided to leave because he did not feel comfortable and had other objectives for his football career.

On 28 February 2011, Merino signed a half-season contract with Unión Comercio– at almost 29, this marked the first time he would be playing in the Peruvian Primera División. He stated that his main reason for joining was to earn a regular starting spot on the Peru national team.

== International career ==
Merino represented Spain at under-18 level, having already spent several years living in the country. He decided to play for Peru as a senior, earning his first and only cap on 7 June 2009 in a 1–2 home loss against Ecuador for the 2010 FIFA World Cup qualifiers.

== Personal life ==
Merino's younger brother, Iván, was also a footballer. A defender, he too represented Mallorca B and Salernitana.

== Honours ==
=== Club ===
Juan Aurich

- Peruvian Primera División: 2011
