= Franco Costanzo =

Argentine footballer (born 1980)

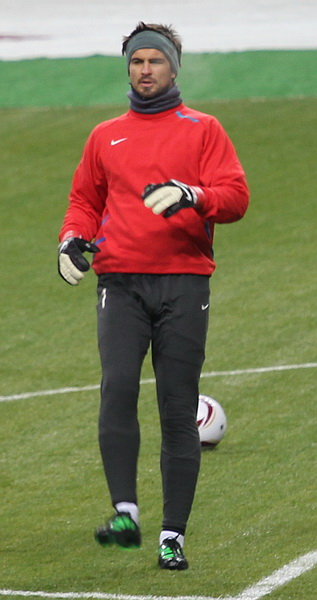

Personal information
- Full name: Franco Costanzo Geymonat
- Date of birth: 5 September 1980 (age 46)
- Place of birth: Río Cuarto, Argentina
- Height: 1.88 m (6 ft 2 in)
- Position: Goalkeeper

Senior career*
Years	Team	Apps	(Gls)
1998–2005	River Plate	87	(0)
2005–2006	Alavés	31	(0)
2006–2011	FC Basel	141	(0)
2011–2012	Olympiacos	6	(0)
2013–2017	Universidad Católica	44	(0)
Total		309	(0)

International career^{‡}
1999	Argentina U-20	4	(0)
2003	Argentina	1	(0)
- * Club domestic league appearances and goals as of 15 October 2017 ‡ National team caps and goals as of 12 December 2010

Franco Costanzo Geymonat (born 5 September 1980) is an Argentine former football goalkeeper who last played for Chilean club Universidad Católica of the Primera División.

== Club career ==
=== River Plate and Alavés ===
Costanzo started playing professionally with Buenos Aires giants Club Atlético River Plate in 2000 and made his first-team debut in 2001. He had become the first-choice goalkeeper by 2002 and was looked upon by many as one of the most talented goalkeepers in South America. However, injury started to plague him and when he returned from the sidelines, Germán Lux had established himself as River Plate's Number 1. His search for first-team action then took him to Spain's La Liga as he transferred to Deportivo Alavés in 2005. He was first choice at Alavés straight away, but when they were relegated into the Segunda División, he asked the manager, José María Salmerón, to be put on the transfer list.

=== Basel ===
Swiss side FC Basel acquired his services in July 2006 for £1.4 million after the departure of veteran goalkeeper Pascal Zuberbühler. Costanzo joined Basel's first team for their 2006–07 season under head coach Christian Gross, who was starting his eighth season in that position. Costanzo's Basel career did not get off to a great start, he made a blunder in his first match against FC St. Gallen on 30 July 2006 and caused the 3–2 away defeat. However, he played excellent in the second half of the 2006–07 season and was voted the FCB Player of the Year. In the second qualifying round of the 2006–07 UEFA Cup Basel were drawn against FC Vaduz from Liechtenstein, narrowly progressing on the away goals rule after a 2–2 aggregate draw. In the first round Basel won 7–2 on aggregate against FK Rabotnički to qualified for the group stage. Here Basel played their first match at home against Feyenoord, this ended in a 1–1 draw. Their second was away and FCB lost 3–0 against Blackburn Rovers. At home against AS Nancy the match was drawn 2–2 and the final game ended with a 3–1 defeat against Wisła Kraków. Basel ended the group stage in last position in the table and were eliminated. Costanzo played in seven of these eight matches, missing the Kraków match due to him being dismissed with a red card in the match against Nancy. At the end of the 2006–07 Super League season Basel were runners-up, one point behind championship winners Zürich. Castanzo played in 33 of the 34 possible league matches. In the Swiss Cup Basel advanced to the final, beating FC Liestal in the first round, Lugano, FC Baulmes, Aarau and Wil in the semi-final. In the final they played Luzern and won this 1–0 thanks to a penalty goal in the third minute of added time. Costanzo played in all six cup games.

Basel played in the 2007–08 UEFA Cup. Winning both matches in the qualification round and both matches in the play-off round, they advanced to the group stage, which they ended undefeated in second position. Costanzo earned much praise, especially for his part in helping the team earn a valuable away point against NK Dinamo Zagreb in the hostile atmosphere of the Maksimir Stadium on 8 November 2007. Basel continued to the knockout stage, But they were eliminated here by Sporting CP. Costanzo missed the second leg due to a knee injury in the first leg. At the end of the 2007–08 season Costanzo won the Double with the club. They won the League Championship title with four points advantage over second placed Young Boys. In the Swiss Cup via FC Léchelles, SC Binningen, Grasshopper Club, Stade Nyonnais and in the semi-final Thun, Basel advanced to the final, and winning this 4–1 against AC Bellinzona they won the competition.

To the beginning of the 2008–09 season he was member of the Basel team that won the Uhrencup. They beat Legia Warsaw 6–1 and played a 2–2 draw with Borussia Dortmund to end the table on top slot above Dortmund and Luzern. On 17 July 2008, the day before the start of the 2008–09 Swiss Super League season, Costanzo was named Basel captain and he signed a new contract until 2011. His first game as captain was on 18 July 2008, in a 2–1 win over BSC Young Boys at the Stade de Suisse, Wankdorf, in which he was named Man of the Match. Basel joined the 2008–09 UEFA Champions League in the second qualifying round and with an aggregate score of 5–3 they eliminated IFK Göteborg. In the next round they played against Vitória de Guimarães. The first leg ended in a goalless draw, but with a 2–1 win in the second leg they eliminated Vitória and advanced to the group stage. Here Basel were matched with Barcelona, Sporting CP and Shakhtar Donetsk but ended the group in last position winning just one point after a 1–1 draw in Camp Nou. Costanzo played all ten games. At the end of the 2008–09 Super League season Basel were third in the table, seven points behind new champions Zürich and one adrift of runners-up Young Boys. In the 2008–09 Swiss Cup Basel advanced via Schötz, Bulle, Thun and Zurich to the semi-finals. But here they were stopped by YB. After a goalless 90 minutes and extra time, YB decided the penalty shoot-out 3–2 and advanced to the final to become runners-up, as Sion became cup winners.

Basel joined the 2009–10 UEFA Europa League in the second qualifying round. Basel advanced to the group stage, in which despite winning three of the six games the ended in third position and were eliminated. They finished four points behind group winners Roma and one behind Fulham, against whom they lost 3–2 in the last game of the stage.

On 9 August 2009, Costanzo and teammate Beg Ferati were involved in a scuffle after a 1–1 with FC Zürich. The pair began arguing on the pitch, and then Ferati shoved Costanzo who responded by pulling Ferati's hair. Other players then pulled them apart before the situation escalated. Costanzo was fined by the club and given a three match ban by the Swiss Football Association. During the Autumn Costanzo's knee problems, that had first occurred over a year earlier, started reoccurring. In October he had to undergo surgery and this kept him out for four months. Basel joined the 2009–10 UEFA Europa League in the second qualifying round. Basel advanced to the group stage, in which despite winning three of the six games the ended in third position and were eliminated. They finished four points behind group winners Roma and one behind Fulham, against whom they lost 3–2 in the last game of the stage. At the end of the 2009–10 season he won the Double with his club. They won the League Championship title with 3 points advantage over second placed Young Boys. In the Swiss Cup via SC Cham, FC Le Mont, Zürich, FC Biel-Bienne and in the semi-final SC Kriens, Basel advanced to the final, and winning this 6–0 against Lausanne-Sport they won the competition.

Basel started in the 2010–11 UEFA Champions League third qualifying round and advanced to the group stage but ended the group in third position. Therefore, they dropped to the 2010–11 Europa League knockout phase, but here they were eliminated by Spartak Moscow due to a last-minute goal against them. Costanzo played in all of the 12 European matches. With Basel, Costanzo won his third Swiss Championship at the end of the 2010–11 season, topping the table just one point clear of rivals Zürich.

At the end of the season Costanzo left the club. Costanzo played for FC Basel for five years, in which time they won the Swiss Cup three times and the national Championship also three times. He also played twice in the Champions League group-stages in the 2008–09 season and the 2010/–11 season where FC Basel did a couple of huge sensations like the draw in the Nou Camp in Barcelona where they tied 1–1 or in the Stadio Olimpico in Rome where they beat AS Roma 3–1. He played his last match for the team on 25 May 2011 and was substituted out in the 87th minute to a standing ovation. He was replaced by his designated successor Yann Sommer. During his time with the club Costanzo played a total of 235 games for Basel. 141 of these games were in the Swiss Super League, 12 in the Swiss Cup, 46 in the UEFA competitions (Champions League, UEFA Cup and Europa League) and 36 were friendly games.

=== Olympiacos and Universidad Católica ===
On 9 June 2011, it was revealed that Costanzo came to an agreement with Greek champions Olympiacos for a three-year contract. Six months later, on 26 January 2012, Costanzo's contract was terminated by mutual consent.

On 21 May 2012, Costanzo retired from professional football without saying clearly the reason of his decision.

On 29 June 2013, Costanzo returned to football signing for Universidad Católica a one-and-a-half-year contract.

== International career ==
Costanzo was an Argentine international at Under-20 level, and was part of the Argentina squad that took part at the 1999 FIFA World Youth Championship. At senior level, he made his only main team appearance in Argentina's 4–2 2006 World Cup Qualifying win over Uruguay at the River Plate Stadium on 9 October 2004.

== Personal life ==
Costanzo is married to Carla. The couple have three children. Their two daughters are named Emma and Zoe, and their son named Ciro. All three children were born in Basel.

== Honours ==
River Plate

- Primera Division Argentina: Clausura 2002, Clausura 2003, Clausura 2004

FC Basel

- Swiss Super League: 2007–08, 2009–10, 2010–11
- Swiss Cup: 2006–07, 2007–08, 2009–10

FC Barcelona

- La Liga: 2009–10, 2010–11, 2010–11
- Champions League: 2009–10, 2010–11, 2011–12

Olympiacos

- Super League Greece: 2011–12
- Greek Cup: 2011–12

Universidad Católica

- Primera División de Chile: Clausura 2015–16, Apertura 2016–17
- Supercopa de Chile: 2016

Sporting positions
Preceded by Ivan Ergić	FC Basel captain 2008–2011	Succeeded by Marco Streller
