= François Marque =

French footballer (born 1983)

Personal information
- Date of birth: 31 July 1983 (age 43)
- Place of birth: Troyes, France
- Height: 1.87 m (6 ft 2 in)
- Position: Centre-back

Team information
- Current team: FC Courtételle (Manager)

Youth career
- Troyes

Senior career*
Years	Team	Apps	(Gls)
2002–2004	RCS La Chapelle	55	(2)
2004–2005	Libourne-Saint-Seurin	0	(0)
2005–2007	FC Baulmes	45	(1)
2007–2010	FC Basel	58	(0)
2010–2011	Grenoble	28	(1)
2011–2013	Bastia	23	(2)
2013–2014	1. FC Saarbrücken	7	(0)
2014–2015	Amiens	12	(1)
2015	Istres	11	(0)
2015–2017	Le Mont	39	(0)
2017	DPMM	1	(0)
2017–2020	Yverdon-Sport	13	(0)
2020–2022	Stade Nyonnais	29	(2)
2022	Stade-Payerne		
2023	FC Thierrens		
2023–2024	Concordia Basel	12	(1)

Managerial career
- 2024–: FC Courtételle
- * Club domestic league appearances and goals

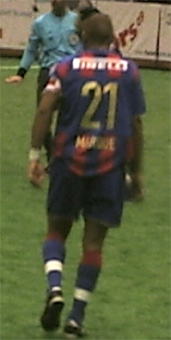

François Marque (born 31 July 1983) is a retired French professional footballer who played as a defender and current manager of FC Courtételle in Switzerland.

== Football career ==
Marque was born in Troyes. He started his career in his native France with amateur club RCS La Chapelle in 2002 where he played 55 games over the course of two seasons. His good performances there caught the eye of Ligue 2 club FC Libourne-Saint-Seurin for whom he signed for in 2004. Marque did not play any games there and left after just one season to join Swiss Challenge League side FC Baulmes in 2005. He impressed at Baulmes and gathered interest from several Swiss Super League teams. On 12 November 2006 Baulmes played in the Swiss Cup third round against Basel, who needed extra time to win the match 3–2 and proceed to the next round. Therefore, Basel were also one of the clubs who showed an interest in the centre back.

After much speculation about his future Marque joined FC Basel in January 2007. At first, on 24. January, he signed a contract that was valid from July 2007 until 30 June 2010. But then Bruno Berner transferred out from Basel, to Blackburn Rovers for a nominal fee, and this move required an immediate replacement. So, in agreement with FC Baulmes, FCB made use of their opportunity to take over the defender with an immediate effect. A corresponding agreement with all parties was reached on 30 January, which meant that Marque was immediately available. He joined Basel's first team during the winter break of their 2007–08 season under head coach Christian Gross.

During his first six months with the club, Marque played just two league and one cup games. He played his league debut with the team in the away game in the Hardturm on 4 March as Basel won 5–1 against Grasshopper Club coming on as substitute for Scott Chipperfield. Basel ended the league season as runners-up and the Swiss Cup as winners. Marque played the full 90 minutes in the semi-final against Wil but was on the bench during the final.

During the 2007–08 season Marque progressed and formed an effective central defensive partnership with Sweden international Daniel Majstorović and this saw him become a first-team regular. Basel played in the 2007–08 UEFA Cup. Winning both matches in the qualification and both matches in the play-off round, they ended the group stage undefeated in second position to advance to the knockout stage. But then they were eliminated here by Sporting CP. Marque played the full 90 minutes in all ten games. At the end of the 2007–08 season he won the Double with the club. They won the League Championship title with four points advantage over second placed Young Boys. In the Swiss Cup via FC Léchelles, SC Binningen, Grasshopper Club, Stade Nyonnais and in the semi-final Thun, Basel advanced to the final, and winning this 4–1 against AC Bellinzona they won the competition.

Majstorović left Basel in Summer 2008 and Marque formed a new partnership with David Abraham. To the beginning of the season, they were members of the Basel team that won the Uhrencup. They beat Legia Warsaw 6–1 and played a 2–2 draw with Borussia Dortmund to end the table on top slot above Dortmund and Luzern.

Basel joined the 2008–09 UEFA Champions League in the second qualifying round and with an aggregate score of 5–3 they eliminated IFK Göteborg. In the next round they played against Vitória de Guimarães. The first leg ended in a goalless draw, but with a 2–1 win in the second leg they eliminated Vitória and advanced to the group stage. Here Basel were matched with Barcelona, Sporting CP and Shakhtar Donetsk but ended the group in last position winning just one point after a 1–1 draw in Camp Nou. Marque played in nine of the ten games, missing only the away game to Sporting due to an injury. At the end of the 2008–09 Super League season Basel were third in the table, seven points behind new champions Zürich and one adrift of runners-up Young Boys. Marque suffered a cruciate ligament rupture in an away match in April and missed the last nine games of the season. In the 2008–09 Swiss Cup Basel advanced via Schötz, Bulle, Thun and Zurich to the semi-finals. But here they were stopped by YB. After a goalless 90 minutes and extra time, YB decided the penalty shoot-out 3–2 and advanced to the final to become runners-up, as Sion became cup winners.

Marque missed all the games during the first half of the following season due to the ligament injury and after he recovered, he moved on. During his time with the team Marque played a total of 120 games for Basel scoring one goal. 58 of these games were in the Swiss Super League, eight in the Swiss Cup, 19 in the UEFA competitions (Champions League and Europa League) and 35 were friendly games. He scored his one-goal during a test game.

On 1 February 2010, the central defender signed a three-and-a-half-year contract with Grenoble Foot. On 19 July 2011, he played in a friendly for Crystal Palace. On 5 August 2011, he signed with French second league team SC Bastia. In October 2013 he signed for 1. FC Saarbrücken but was released four months later after failing a doping test.

Marque signed for S.League side Brunei DPMM FC for the 2017 S.League season. His debut on 3 March against Home United only lasted half-an-hour as he went off with an injury, but not before conceding a penalty. He was released later that month and was replaced by Serbian Željko Savić.

== Later career ==
In the second half of 2022, Marque played for Swiss amateur club FC Stade-Payerne. In the first half of 2023, he played for FC Thierrens. After that he moved to FC Concordia Basel, where he played until the summer of 2024.

Already in April 2024, it was confirmed that Marque had been hired as manager of the Swiss club FC Courtételle from the 2024-25 season.

== Honours ==
Basel

- Swiss Cup: 2008
- Swiss Super League: 2008
- Uhren Cup: 2008
