= Patrik Baumann =

Swiss footballer (born 1986)

Personal information
- Date of birth: 29 July 1986 (age 40)
- Place of birth: Basel, Switzerland
- Height: 1.85 m (6 ft 1 in)
- Positions: Centre-back; right-back; defensive midfielder

Youth career
- FC Amicitia Riehen
- FC Concordia Basel
- –2005: FC Basel

Senior career*
Years	Team	Apps	(Gls)
2005–2006	FC Basel U-21	78	(18)
2006–2009	FC Basel	2	(0)
2008–2009	→ Concordia (loan)	35	(1)
2009–2010	FC Solothurn	4	(1)
2010	SC Kriens	10	(1)
2010–2012	Servette FC	33	(3)
2013–2015	FC Winterthur	14	(1)
2015	YF Juventus		
2016–2017	Servette FC	3	(0)

International career
2007–2008	Switzerland U-21	2	(0)
- * Club domestic league appearances and goals

Patrik Baumann (born 29 July 1986) is a former Swiss footballer who played as a defender. He usually played as a centre-back, but was also deployed at right-back or in midfield.

== Football career ==
Baumann started his children's football with local club Amicitia Riehen. He then moved to FC Concordia Basel and later joined the youth department of FC Basel. Here he advanced through the ranks and won the U-18 championship in 2004. He advanced to the U-21 team during spring of 2004, where he played three successful seasons in the third tier of Swiss football. He advanced to Basel's first team toward the end of their 2006–07 season under head coach Christian Gross, who was in his eighth season in that position. After playing in six test games Baumann played his domestic league debut for the club in the away game in the Stade Tourbillon on 20 August 2006 as Basel suffered a 4–2 defeat against Sion. In January 2008 Baumann was loaned out to FC Concordia Basel, who played second tier, for six months to gain first-team experience. He became an important player for Concordia, playing thirteen games and scoring one goal, during his time there. He returned to FC Basel in the summer but Concordia were keen to acquire his services for another season and Basel allowed him to move there on another six-month loan spell.

He returned to Basel in the Summer of 2009 and on 2 September 2009 he went on trial to FC Schalke 04. But this was not successful. After failed negotiations to extend his contract for a further three years with Basel, Baumann was without a club for a few months due to a foot operation. During his time with their first team, Baumann played a total of 19 games for Basel without scoring a goal. Two of these games were in the Swiss Super League, three in the Swiss Cup and 14 were friendly games.

After spells with FC Solothurn and SC Kriens, Baumann joined Servette FC in 2010. He was one of Servette's most used players during the 2010-11 Swiss Challenge League season. In the club's promotion/relegation play-off against AC Bellinzona, Baumann scored Servette's second and third goals as the club won 3–1, gaining promotion to the Swiss Super League. After a promising start in the top flight in the 2011–12 season, Baumann severely injured his knee in a match against FC Lucerne, and missed the rest of the season.

In January 2016 Servette FC announced that they were re-signing Patrick Baumann. He initially signed on a 6-month contract with an option for 2 more seasons as well as integration into the academy.
