= Ivan Ergić =

Serbian footballer

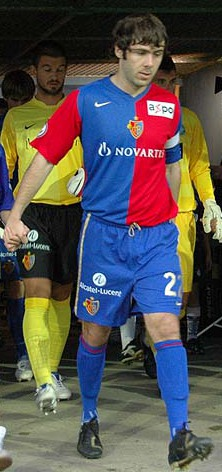
- Ergić captaining Basel in 2007

Personal information
- Full name: Ivan Ergić
- Date of birth: 21 January 1981 (age 45)
- Place of birth: Šibenik, SR Croatia, SFR Yugoslavia
- Height: 1.85 m (6 ft 1 in)
- Position: Midfielder

Youth career
- 1997–1998: AIS

Senior career*
Years	Team	Apps	(Gls)
1999–2000	Perth Glory	23	(10)
2000–2001	Juventus	0	(0)
2001–2009	FC Basel	202	(31)
2009–2011	Bursaspor	58	(9)
Total		283	(50)

International career
1999	Australia U20	1	(1)
2006–2008	Serbia (Note: Including 3 caps for Serbia and Montenegro)	11	(0)
- * Club domestic league appearances and goals

Ivan Ergić (Serbian Cyrillic: Иван Ергић, pronounced [ǐvan êrgitɕ]; born 21 January 1981) is a retired Serbian footballer who played as a midfielder.

Born in modern-day Croatia and raised in Australia, he began his career at Perth Glory and was briefly with Juventus before moving to Switzerland's FC Basel in 2001, where he played 202 league matches. He left in 2009 for Bursaspor, where he spent two seasons, winning the Turkish Süper Lig in the first.

Ergić was a member of the Serbia and Montenegro squad at the 2006 FIFA World Cup, and earned 11 international caps between 2006 and 2008.

== Club career ==
=== Perth Glory ===
Ergić was born in the coastal town of Šibenik in SR Croatia, SFR Yugoslavia but was raised in the near-by village of Gaćelezi.

Following the Breakup of Yugoslavia family Ergić fled from the Yugoslav wars to Australia and settled in Carnarvon, Western Australia in 1997. The young Ergić later and trained at the Australian Institute of Sport on a government-funded football scholarship.

Ergić signed his first professional football contract with Perth Glory in 1999 and helped the club finish the regular 1999–2000 NSL season as division winners. In the final-series he scored a 'golden goal' in the semi-final to send the club into their first ever final. The 2000 NSL Grand Final was held on 11 June and Glory took a three-goal lead by half time, but their opponents Wollongong Wolves pulled the game back and it ended in a 3–3 draw. The score remained level, even after extra time. The Wolves won the penalty shoot-out and Scott Chipperfield won the Joe Marston Medal as man of the match.

=== Basel ===
==== 2000–01 ====
In July 2000, Ergić signed for Italian Serie A team Juventus. However, he was immediately loaned out to Swiss side FC Basel, so that he could gain playing experience. He joined Basel's first team for their 2000–01 season under head coach Christian Gross, who started his second season with the club in that position. After playing in one test game, Ergić played his domestic league debut for his new club in the away game on 5 August as Basel were defeated 1–0 by Yverdon-Sport. Basel started somewhat irregularly into the season, a number of high scoring games, three victories, three defeats. They then gathered themselves and climbed to the top of the table. However, four defeats in the last five games, through them back to fifth position, at the end of the qualifying stage. Ergić scored his first goal with his new team in the home game in the Stadion Schützenmatte on 10 December. But his goal could not help the team as Basel were defeated 3–2 by Lausanne-Sport. Basel were able to play their home games of the championship group in their new stadium, the St. Jakob-Park which opened on 15 March 2001 and it was sold out with 33,433 spectators on three occasions. However, in the second half of the season, the team played eight draws in their 14 matches and so ended the season in fourth position.

==== 2001–02 ====
Basel played in the 2001 UEFA Intertoto Cup. Basel advanced to the final but were defeated by Aston Villa. Ergić played in six of these UIC matches, but missed the return leg of the final due to injury. The 2001–02 league season started in the worst possible way. In their first game away against FC Sion, Basel suffered a humiliating 8–1 defeat. They also lost two of the next four games. The team then started an eleven-match unbeaten run, winning nine of these games. Basel ended the qualification as league leaders, five points ahead of Lugano. Ergić advanced to become regular starter, in his first season he had been used mainly as substitute. Basel started well into the second part of the season and during this period FCB played their best football, pulling away at the top of the table and subsequently achieved the championship title prematurely. Basel won the last game of the season, on 8 May 2002, and became champions ten points clear at the top of the table. Just four days later they played in the cup final against Grasshopper Club, winning 2–1 after extra time, thus they won the domestic double.

==== 2002–03 and 03–04 ====
Basel's 2002–03 UEFA Champions League season started in the second qualifying round. After beating Žilina 4–1 on aggregate and Celtic on the away goals rule after a 3–3 aggregate, Basel advanced to the group stage. They ended this in second position behind Valencia, but ahead of Liverpool and Spartak Moscow to advance to the second group stage. Ergić quickly became one of the team's main players. In the Champions League he played nine of the team's first eleven games and showed strong performances. As Juventus wanted to re-call him to them, he injured himself. After operations on both groins, he also fell ill with glandular fever. He missed the rest of the season and the entire of the following, with them exception of one match at the end of the 2003–04 season.

==== 2004–05 ====
In the summer of 2004, because of his depression, Ergić was sent to the University Psychiatric Clinics "UPK" Basel, where he spent four months with inpatient treatment. When he made his illness public, FC Basel stood to him. The then patron Gigi Oeri visited Ergić several times in the clinic and the head Christian Gross gave him the required time and campaigned for a contract extension. He signed definitive for FCB for a suspected CHF1.6 million.

Ergić returned to the team during the winter break of their 2004–05 season and appeared in ten league matches, always as substitute. They ended the season as Swiss champions with 10 points advantage over second placed Thun.

==== 2005–06 ====
To the beginning of their 2005–06 season, he was fully integrated in the team again. In their first game Ergić scored their winning goal as FCB were 1–0 victors over Schaffhausen. As Swiss champions, Basel entered the 2005–06 Champions League third qualifying round. However, they were drawn against German Bundesliga club Werder Bremen and they lost 4–2 on aggregate. Subsequently, Basel dropped into the 2005–06 UEFA Cup, where against NK Široki Brijeg in the first round, they sealed a 6–0 aggregate win to qualify for the Group stage. Here Basel were then drawn into Group E, alongside Strasbourg, Roma, Red Star Belgrade and Tromsø. Basel qualified for the knock-out stage and in the round of 32 Basel were drawn against AS Monaco, this was won 2–1 on aggregate. In the round of 16 Basel were drawn against Strasbourgh winning 4–2 on aggregate. In the quarter-finals, drawn against Middlesbrough they won the first leg 2–0, but Middlesbrough fought back to win the return match 4–1 and the tie 4–3 on aggregate. Ergić appeared in all of these games bar one.

Basel started into the 2005–06 Super League season well and led the championship right until the last day of the league campaign. On the final day of the league season Basel played at home against Zürich. Mladen Petrić had scored an equaliser after FCZ had taken an early lead. But then a last-minute goal from Zürich's Iulian Filipescu meant the final score was 1–2 in favour of the away team and it gave FCZ their first national championship since 1980–81. The title for Basel was lost on goal difference. Ergić played in 31 of the team's 36 league games, scoring four goals. The last minute loss of the Championship and the subsequent riots, the so-called Basel Hooligan Incident, meant that the club would suffer the consequences.

==== 2006–07 ====
Ergić was given the captaincy as Pascal Zuberbühler transferred to West Bromwich Albion in the summer of 2006. FC Basel's European campaign started in the first qualifying stage of the 2006–07 UEFA Cup, here they beat Kazakhi side FC Tobol 3–1 on aggregate. In the second qualifying round they were drawn against FC Vaduz from Liechtenstein, narrowly progressing on the away goals rule after a 2–2 aggregate draw. In the first round Basel won 7–2 on aggregate against FK Rabotnički to qualified for the group stage. Here Basel played their first match at home against Feyenoord, this ended in a 1–1 draw. Their second was away and FCB lost 3–0 against Blackburn Rovers. At home against AS Nancy the match was drawn 2–2 and the final game ended with a 3–1 defeat against Wisła Kraków. Basel ended the group stage in last position in the table and were eliminated. Captain Ergić played in all of these ten matches. At the end of the 2006–07 Super League season Basel were runners-up, one point behind championship winners Zürich. In the Swiss Cup Basel advanced to the final, beating FC Liestal in the first round, Lugano, FC Baulmes, Aarau and Wil in the semi-final. In the final they played Luzern and won this 1–0 thanks to a penalty goal in the third minute of added time.

==== 2007–08 ====
Basel played in the 2007–08 UEFA Cup. Winning both matches in the qualification round and both matches in the play-off round, they team advanced to the group stage, which they ended undefeated in second position, after playing 1–0 at home against Stade Rennes, 0–0 away against Dinamo Zagreb, 1–0 at home against Brann and 1–1 away against Hamburger SV, to continue the knockout stage. But then they were eliminated here by Sporting CP. Ergić played in nine of these ten matches, scoring four goals. At the end of the 2007–08 season he won the Double with the club. They won the League Championship title with four points advantage over second placed Young Boys. In the Swiss Cup via FC Léchelles, SC Binningen, Grasshopper Club, Stade Nyonnais and in the semi-final Thun, Basel advanced to the final, and winning this 4–1 against AC Bellinzona they won the competition.

==== 2008–09 ====
To the beginning of the 2008–09 season he was member of the Basel team that won the Uhrencup. They beat Legia Warsaw 6–1 and played a 2–2 draw with Borussia Dortmund to end the table on top slot above Dortmund and Luzern. But in advance of their 2008–09 season Ergić resigned from being team captain and handed this job over to his teammate, Franco Costanzo. Basel joined the 2008–09 UEFA Champions League in the second qualifying round and with an aggregate score of 5–3 they eliminated IFK Göteborg. In the next round they played against Vitória de Guimarães. The first leg ended in a goalless draw, but with a 2–1 win in the second leg they eliminated Vitória and advanced to the group stage. Here Basel were matched with Barcelona, Sporting CP and Shakhtar Donetsk, but ended the group in last position winning just one point after a 1–1 draw in Camp Nou. Ergić appeared in nine of these 10 European games, scoring two goals. At the end of the 2008–09 Super League season Basel were third in the table, seven points behind new champions Zürich and one adrift of runners-up Young Boys.

Head coach Christian Gross left the club at the end of the season. Then on 16 June 2009, Ergić was released by FC Basel after newly hired manager Thorsten Fink decided not to offer him a new contract. He had spent nine years with the club. Between the years 2000 and 2009 he played a total of 365 games for Basel scoring a total of 64 goals. 202 of these games were in the Swiss Super League, 23 in the Swiss Cup, 58 in the UEFA competitions (Champions League, UEFA Cup and UIC) and 82 were friendly games. He scored 31 goals in the domestic league, five in the cup, nine in the European games and the other 19 were scored during the test games.

=== Bursaspor ===
He then signed for Bursaspor of the Turkish Süper Lig. In Ergić's first season with Bursaspor, the club won the 2009–10 Süper Lig, the first time in Bursaspor's history of winning the league. He featured in five games of the 2010–11 UEFA Champions League.

== International career ==
Ergić represented the Australian under-20 national team in a friendly against South Korea in February 1999, scoring in a 3–2 loss.

However, Ergić did not choose to play international football for Australia, and instead chose Serbia. On 15 May 2006, he was named as a member of the squad to take part at the 2006 FIFA World Cup in Germany. He made his international debut in Serbia & Montenegro's 1–1 draw with Uruguay at the Red Star Stadium in Belgrade on 27 May 2006. He left the national team 2007, but he returned in 2008.

== Outside football ==
Ergić self-identifies as a Yugoslav.

=== Depression ===
In June 2004, Ergić was treated for depression in the psychiatric university clinic in Basel, and his further career as a football player was in question at the time. Nevertheless, FC Basel kept him as a player and eventually made him club captain. He is also close friends with Ljubo Miličević. He appeared on the Swiss late night show Aeschbacher, stating that football players earn too much money and expressing sympathies for the ideas of Karl Marx. He also appeared on RTS (Serbian public broadcaster) programme Ključ where he openly discussed his battle with depression as well as treatment he had undergone.

=== Journalism ===
Since December 2008, Ergić has been writing an irregular column for Serbian daily newspaper Politika. His contributions are about issues related to professional sports, written from an insider's viewpoint. He's touched on various topics such as: male chauvinism in sports, raw competitive spirit he considers to be unhealthy, corporate machinery behind institutionalized sports, and lack of public's understanding for professional athletes who do not subscribe to a cliché lifestyle created by sports media, fans, club leadership, and leagues stakeholders and officials.

== Honours ==
Perth Glory

- National Soccer League: 1999–2000

Basel

- Schweizer Cup: 2002, 2003, 2007, 2008
- Swiss Super League: 2002, 2004, 2005, 2008
- Uhrencup: 2003, 2006, 2008

Bursaspor

- Turkish Super League: 2009–10

== Sources ==
- Die ersten 125 Jahre. Publisher: Josef Zindel im Friedrich Reinhardt Verlag, Basel. ISBN 978-3-7245-2305-5
- Verein "Basler Fussballarchiv" Homepage

Sporting positions
Preceded by Pascal Zuberbühler	FC Basel captain 2006–2008	Succeeded by Franco Costanzo
