= João Paulo (footballer, born January 1981) =

Brazilian footballer

Personal information
- Full name: João Paulo Daniel
- Date of birth: 12 January 1981 (age 45)
- Place of birth: Araras, Brazil
- Height: 1.80 m (5 ft 11 in)
- Position: Forward

Senior career*
Years	Team	Apps	(Gls)
2000–2004	Paulista		
2002	→ União São João (loan)		
2003	→ Juventude (loan)	20	(1)
2004–2005	Servette	10	(5)
2005	Ciudad de Murcia	16	(4)
2005–2007	Young Boys	57	(25)
2007	→ Strasbourg (loan)	13	(3)
2008	Neuchâtel Xamax	16	(2)
2009–2010	Portimonense	17	(2)
2010	Desportivo Brasil	0	(0)
2010	São Caetano	9	(0)
2011	PAEC		
2011–2012	Wisła Płock	32	(5)
2013	Grêmio Recreativo		
- * Club domestic league appearances and goals

João Paulo Daniel (born 12 January 1981) is a Brazilian former professional footballer who played as a forward.

== Career ==
Born in Araras, São Paulo state, João Paulo started his career at Paulista Futebol Clube. He was loaned to União São João and Juventude in 2002 and 2003 season. In September 2004 he left for Servette FC of Swiss Super League. In mid-season, he left for Ciudad de Murcia of Spanish Segunda División along with Roberto Merino due to bankrupt of the club.

In mid-2005, he was signed by Young Boys. In 2006 he helped Young Boys reach the Swiss Cup Final, however he missed his penalty in the shootout and they were defeated by FC Sion. He was loaned to Strasbourg in January 2007. He signed a two-year contract extension in the June 2007. but left for league rival Neuchâtel Xamax in December, on a reported 3 1/2-year contract. However, he left the club in January 2009.

In October 2009 he left for Liga de Honra side Portimonense and finished as the runner-up of the league and promoted to Primeira Liga.

In August 2010 he returned to Brazil, signed a contract until end of year with Desportivo Brasil of Campeonato Paulista Segunda Divisão. He played 4 times for the club at the state league 4th level. The team finished as the losing side of the second stage (round of 24), finished as the bottom of the group.

In September, he left for São Caetano.

=== Wisła Płock ===
In July 2011, he joined Polish club Wisła Płock on a one-year contract.
