= Dominique Longo =

Swiss footballer (born 1983)

Personal information
- Date of birth: 12 January 1983 (age 43)
- Place of birth: Switzerland
- Height: 1.81 m (5 ft 11 in)
- Position: Defender

Team information
- Current team: FC Frauenfeld
- Number: 4

Senior career*
Years	Team	Apps	(Gls)
2003–2004	FC St. Gallen	4	(0)
2004–2005	FC St. Gallen II	12	(3)
2005–2007	FC Wil 1900	41	(3)
2007–2008	FC St. Gallen	4	(1)
2008–2009	FC Gossau	9	(0)
2009–	FC Frauenfeld		
- * Club domestic league appearances and goals

Dominique Longo (born 12 January 1983) is a Swiss football defender, who currently plays for FC Frauenfeld.
