= Virgile Reset =

French footballer (born 1985)

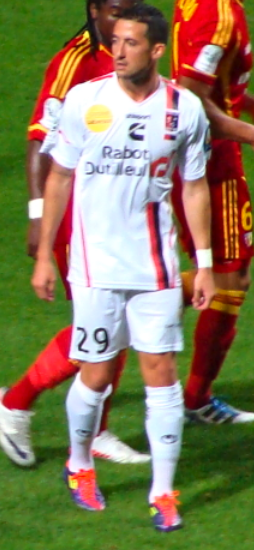

Personal information
- Date of birth: 3 August 1985 (age 41)
- Place of birth: Les Lilas, France
- Height: 1.76 m (5 ft 9 in)
- Position: Winger

Team information
- Current team: Toulon

Senior career*
Years	Team	Apps	(Gls)
2003–2006	Lorient	43	(5)
2006–2009	Sion	88	(7)
2009–2011	Vannes	67	(13)
2011–2013	Boulogne	35	(5)
2012–2013	→ Sedan (loan)	12	(0)
2013–2014	Fréjus Saint-Raphaël	13	(2)
2014–2016	Toulon	36	(8)
- * Club domestic league appearances and goals as of 15:48, 11 October 2013 (UTC)

Virgile Reset (born 3 August 1985) is a French football midfielder, who currently plays for Sporting Toulon Var.

== Career ==
Reset began his career with Lorient and joined than in summer 2006 to Sion. On 21 July 2009 the 24-year-old forward has left FC Sion to sign a three-year deal with Vannes OC.

== Honours ==
- Swiss Cup: 2008–09
