= Fritz Schmid (football manager) =

Swiss football manager (born 1959)

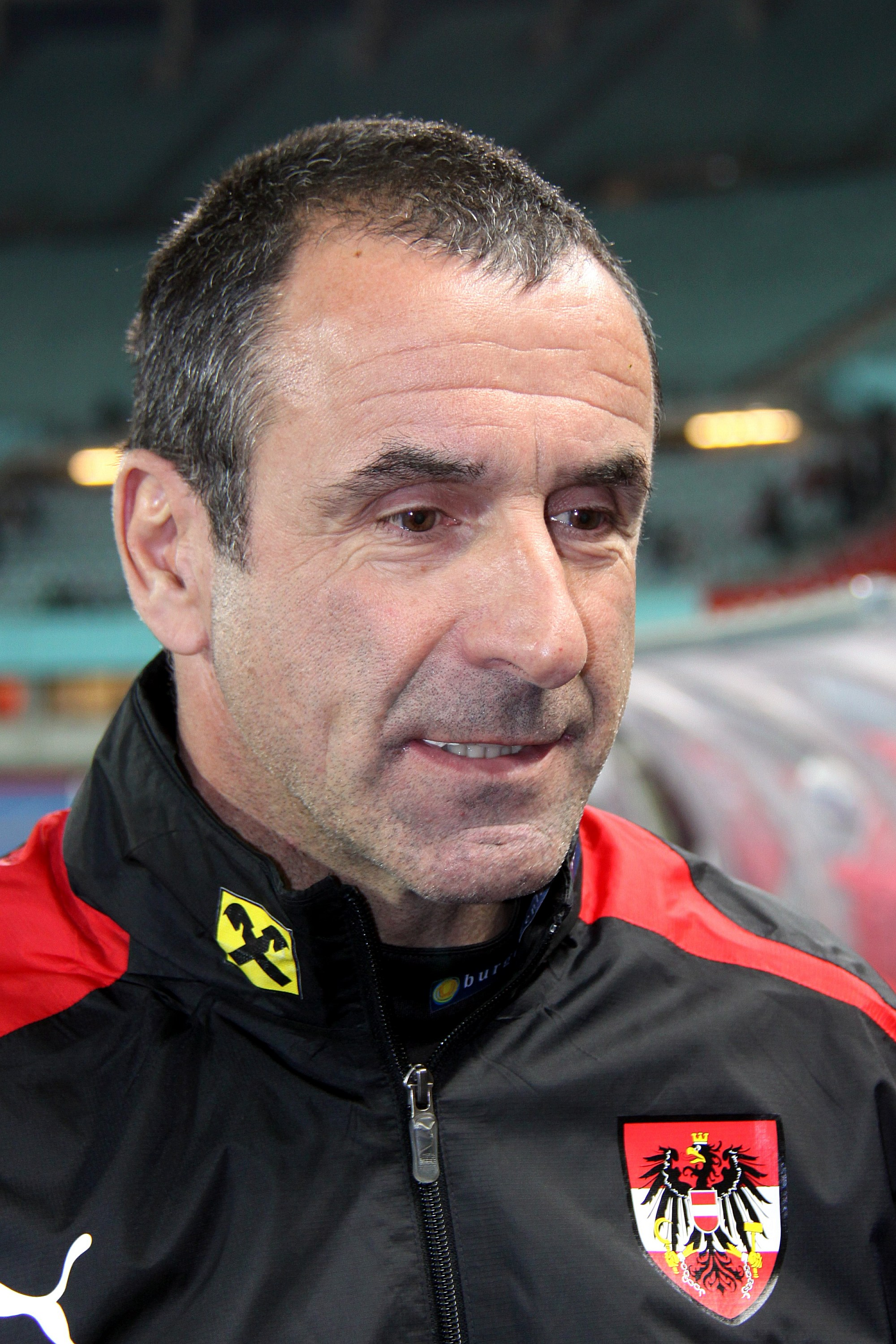
- Schmid with the Austria national team in 2013

Personal information
- Full name: Fritz Markus Schmid
- Date of birth: 10 September 1959 (age 67)
- Place of birth: Zug, Switzerland

Managerial career
- Years: Team
- 1981–1984: Racing Zürich
- 1986–1990: Grasshoppers (youth)
- 1991–1994: Racing Zürich
- 1994–1995: Grasshoppers (youth)
- 1997–1998: Tottenham Hotspur (assistant)
- 1998–1999: FC Aarau (assistant)
- 1998–1999: Team Aargau
- 2000–2001: SC Kriens
- 2002–2009: FC Basel (assistant)
- 2011–2013: Austria (assistant)
- 2014–2017: Malaysia (technical director)
- 2018–2019: New Zealand
- 2022: Kotoku Royals (interim)
- 2024–: Grasshoppers (academy director)

Fritz Schmid (born 10 September 1959) is a Swiss football coach.

He spent seven years as the assistant manager of FC Basel under head coach Christian Gross, a period in which the club won the Swiss Cup four times and qualified for the UEFA Champions League twice. In 2018, he was appointed manager of the New Zealand national team.

In April 2022, Schmid stepped in as interim head coach of Ghanaian team Kotoku Royals for the remainder of the 2021–22 season.

On 15 February 2024, he was appointed as the technical director of Grasshopper Club Zürich's academy.

== Managerial Statistics ==
As of Match played 21 June 2019

Team	From	To	Record				
Team	From	To	G	W	D	L	Win %
New Zealand	23 February 2018	2019	4	2	0	2	50.00
