= Richmond Rak =

Ghanaian-Swiss footballer (born 1985)

Personal information
- Full name: Richmond Ageymang-Rak
- Date of birth: 10 March 1985 (age 41)
- Place of birth: Accra, Ghana
- Height: 1.73 m (5 ft 8 in)
- Position: Midfielder

Team information
- Current team: FC Le Mont
- Number: 16

Youth career
- Lausanne Sports

Senior career*
Years	Team	Apps	(Gls)
?–2002	FC Montreux-Sports		
2002–2006	Lausanne Sports	82	(12)
2006	Grasshopper Club Zürich	1	(0)
2007–2011	Neuchâtel Xamax	36	(0)
2011–	FC Le Mont	-	(-)

International career
	Switzerland U-20	7	(0)
- * Club domestic league appearances and goals as of 15 July 2008

Richmond Ageymang-Rak (born 10 March 1985) is a Ghanaian-Swiss footballer, who currently plays as midfielder for FC Le Mont in the Swiss Challenge League. He holds both a Ghanaian passport and a Swiss passport.

== Career ==
Rak signed a 3 1/2-year contract with Neuchâtel Xamax in January 2007. In August 2011, he signed with Swiss side FC Le Mont for the 2011–2012 Swiss Challenge League season after his contract with Neuchâtel Xamax had expired and was not renewed.
