= Cem Atan =

Turkish-Austrian footballer (born 1985)

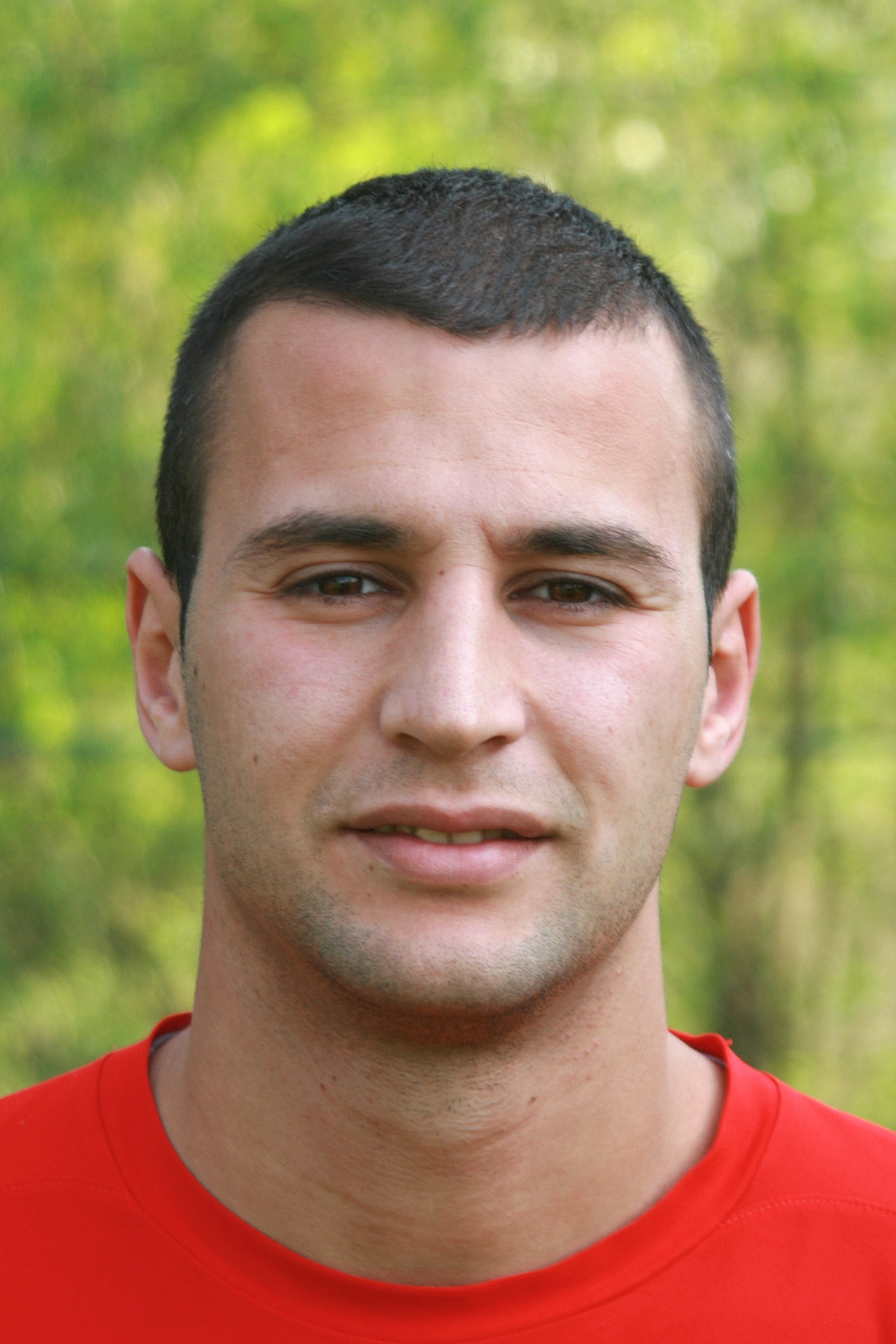

Personal information
- Date of birth: 30 June 1985 (age 41)
- Place of birth: Wiener Neustadt, Austria
- Height: 1.84 m (6 ft 0 in)
- Position: Midfielder

Youth career
- 1993–2002: Wiener Neustädter

Senior career*
Years	Team	Apps	(Gls)
2002–2003	Wiener Neustädter	28	(16)
2003–2005	Rapid Wien II	40	(7)
2005–2006	TSV Hartberg	13	(2)
2006–2010	SV Mattersburg	137	(14)
2010–2011	Gençlerbirliği	1	(0)
2011	LASK Linz	8	(0)
2011–2012	TSV Hartberg	12	(1)
2012–2013	Kızılcahamamspor	9	(0)
2013	Fethiyespor	13	(0)
2014	Gümüşhanespor	13	(1)
2015	St. Pölten II	8	(0)
2015–2016	FC Stadlau	27	(11)
2016–2017	FCM Traiskirchen	14	(1)
2017	FC Stadlau	28	(3)
2018–	ASK Eggendorf		

International career
2007	Austria	2	(0)
- * Club domestic league appearances and goals as of 23 March 2016

Cem Atan (born 30 June 1985 in Wiener Neustadt) is a Turkish-Austrian footballer who plays as a midfielder for ASK Eggendorf.

== Career ==
=== ASK Eggendorf ===
In January 2018, Atan joined ASK Eggendorf.
