= Fernando de Souza =

Brazilian footballer (born 1980)

Personal information
- Full name: Fernando César de Souza
- Date of birth: 12 September 1980 (age 46)
- Place of birth: Jardinopolis, Brazil
- Height: 1.76 m (5 ft 9 1/2 in)
- Position: Defender

Senior career*
Years	Team	Apps	(Gls)
1999–2001	SC Kriens	55	(2)
2001–2003	Comercial-SP		
2003–2007	FC Schaffhausen	113	(3)
2007–2011	FC St. Gallen	97	(0)
2012–2013	Toledo	26	(0)
2014	Maringá	22	(0)
2014	→ Inter de Lages (loan)	13	(0)
- * Club domestic league appearances and goals as of 11 September 2016

Fernando César de Souza (born 12 September 1980 in Jardinopolis) is a footballer from Brazil who plays as a defender. He has spent much of his playing career in the Swiss Super League.
