= Michel Sprunger =

Swiss footballer (born 1985)

Personal information
- Full name: Michel Sprunger
- Date of birth: 30 April 1985 (age 41)
- Height: 1.77 m (5 ft 10 in)
- Position: Midfielder

Team information
- Current team: SC Dornach

Senior career*
Years	Team	Apps	(Gls)
2005–2008	FC Concordia Basel	77	(7)
2008–2013	FC Winterthur	76	(14)
2013–	SC Dornach		
- * Club domestic league appearances and goals as of 18 July 2013

Michel Sprunger (born 30 April 1985) is a Swiss footballer who plays as a midfielder for SC Dornach.
