= Christian Gross =

Swiss football manager (born 1954)

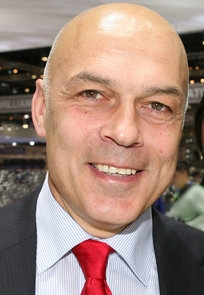
- Gross in 2009

Personal information
- Full name: Christian Jürgen Gross
- Date of birth: 14 August 1954 (age 72)
- Place of birth: Zürich, Switzerland
- Height: 1.83 m (6 ft 0 in)
- Positions: Sweeper; central midfielder

Youth career
- –1965: SV Höngg
- 1965–1972: Grasshopper

Senior career*
Years	Team	Apps	(Gls)
1972–1976	Grasshopper		
1976–1978	Lausanne-Sport		
1978–1980	Neuchâtel Xamax	50	(3)
1980–1981	VfL Bochum	29	(4)
1981–1985	St. Gallen	109	(11)
1985–1987	Lugano		
1987–1988	Yverdon-Sport		

International career
1978	Switzerland	1	(0)

Managerial career
- 1988–1993: Wil
- 1993–1997: Grasshopper
- 1997–1998: Tottenham Hotspur
- 1999–2009: Basel
- 2009–2010: VfB Stuttgart
- 2011–2012: Young Boys
- 2014–2017: Al-Ahli
- 2018–2019: Zamalek
- 2019–2020: Al-Ahli
- 2020–2021: Schalke 04
- 2024–2025: Zamalek
- * Club domestic league appearances and goals

Christian Jürgen Gross (born 14 August 1954) is a football manager and former player from Switzerland. He played as a sweeper and central midfielder. Gross was manager of Basel from 1999 to 2009, winning four Swiss Super Leagues and four Swiss Cups. As manager of Tottenham Hotspur between November 1997 and September 1998, Gross became the first Swiss to manage in the Premier League.

== Playing career ==
Gross began his playing career at SV Höngg before moving to Grasshopper in 1965, which he left in 1976. After two years at Lausanne-Sport and two seasons at Neuchâtel Xamax, he moved to Germany in 1980 to play for VfL Bochum of the Bundesliga. In two seasons Gross made 29 appearances in the Bundesliga and scored four goals. He then returned to Switzerland and spent three years at St. Gallen, Lugano and Yverdon-Sport. Gross was capped once for Switzerland, making his debut on 8 March 1978 in a 3–1 friendly away defeat to East Germany.

== Managerial career ==
=== Early career ===
Gross began his managerial career at Swiss side Wil in the 2. Liga (then the fourth-highest level), for whom he was active as player-manager. During his reign from 1988 to 1993, Wil climbed into the 1. Liga and then the Nationalliga B (now the Challenge League). While at Wil, Gross developed a reputation for an emphasis on fitness and hard work. He then joined Grasshopper as head coach in 1993. Under Gross, Grasshopper won two Swiss championships and the Swiss Cup. Gross's success with Grasshopper meant he was a very highly rated coach in his native Switzerland, but he was still little-known outside central Europe and it was a major shock when in November 1997 he was chosen to succeed Gerry Francis as manager of Tottenham Hotspur.

=== Tottenham Hotspur ===
Gross was hired on 19 November 1997, with Tottenham in the relegation zone. Swiss fitness coach Fritz Schmid, who had been an integral part of Gross' training plans at Grasshopper, was denied a work permit by the British government and so was unable to take up this role at Tottenham.

Gross' initial fortunes were mixed; his debut was a 2–0 win over Everton at Goodison Park, followed by a heavy 6–1 home defeat at the hands of Chelsea. However, despite some signs of improvement, he was relentlessly ridiculed by the British tabloids. The ridicule was often linked to his poor grasp of English and first Spurs press conference, where he arrived late from Heathrow Airport brandishing a London Underground ticket with the words: "I want this to become my ticket to the dreams".

Gross' position became increasingly untenable as the 1998–99 season approached, and when Spurs lost two of their opening three matches, chairman Alan Sugar ended Gross' contract on 5 September 1998. In a statement, Sugar blamed the media for destroying Gross' reputation. He had won three of his last ten matches.

=== Basel ===
Gross returned to his native Switzerland, finding work as the manager of Basel on 15 June 1999. He worked to rebuild Basel into the premier force in Swiss football and achieved greater success than when manager of Grasshopper.

Under Gross' guidance, Basel won four Swiss championships, four Swiss Cups, and mounted a fairytale run in the UEFA Champions League in the 2002–03 season, beating eventual finalists Juventus as well as knocking out Celtic and drawing with Liverpool (twice) and Manchester United. Gross' success in these games against British sides went a long way towards restoring his reputation among the British media and fans. He took Basel on another European adventure three seasons later as they reached the quarter finals of the UEFA Cup in 2005–06, before bowing out to English side Middlesbrough 4–3 on aggregate despite leading 2–0 after the first leg at St. Jakob-Park.

On 17 May 2009, Gross was attacked by fans of Zürich on a tram after Basel defeated Zürich that day. He received no serious injuries. On 27 May, he was sacked after ten years at the club.

=== VfB Stuttgart ===
On 6 December 2009, Gross was revealed as the new manager of VfB Stuttgart. Sensationally, he guided the team to qualification to the UEFA Europa League. Gross was dismissed from his managerial job on 13 October 2010 after six defeats in seven matches, when Stuttgart found itself at the bottom of the table.

=== Young Boys ===
Gross signed a two-year contract on 8 May 2011 to become the new manager of Young Boys, following the sacking of former manager Vladimir Petković. However, after a run of poor results, Gross was sacked on 30 April 2012.

=== Al-Ahli ===
Gross was appointed manager of Al-Ahli on 18 June 2014, He achieved with Al-Ahli the Saudi Professional League, the King Cup and the Saudi Crown Prince Cup but refused to renew his contract allowing him to leave on 30 May 2016. On 3 October 2016, with the sacking of José Gomes, Gross returned to the club for a second spell.

=== Zamalek ===
In April 2018, Gross signed a two-year contract with the Egyptian club Zamalek. He won The Egyptian-Saudi Supercup 2018, and followed that up with a win in the African Confederation Cup in May 2019, which was the first African title for the Egyptian giants since 2002. The deal appeared to collapse in May after the confederation cup final, but it was confirmed to be a one-year deal on 3 July 2018. On 1 June 2019, Egypt Today confirmed that Gross had been fired from his position, President Mortada Mansour of the club told Mehwar TV that "Gross is specialist in failure".

=== Third spell at Al-Ahli ===
On 16 October 2019, Gross returned to Al-Ahli for a third spell. On 17 February 2020, Al-Ahli terminated his contract.

=== Schalke 04 ===
On 27 December 2020, Gross became the fourth head coach for Schalke 04 during the 2020–21 season. On 28 February 2021, Gross was sacked.

=== Second spell at Zamalek ===
On 15 December 2024, Gross returned to Zamalek for a second spell.

== Managerial statistics ==
As of 11 February 2025

Managerial record by team and tenure
Team	From	To	Record					Ref.
Team	From	To	P	W	D	L	Win %	Ref.
Wil	1 July 1988	30 June 1993	69	28	20	21	40.58	–
Grasshopper	1 July 1993	19 November 1997	194	105	51	38	54.12	
Tottenham Hotspur	19 November 1997	5 September 1998	30	10	8	12	33.33	
Basel	15 June 1999	27 May 2009	498	289	115	94	58.03	
VfB Stuttgart	6 December 2009	13 October 2010	36	20	7	9	55.56	
Young Boys	8 May 2011	30 April 2012	36	14	13	9	38.89	
Al-Ahli	18 June 2014	30 May 2016	83	58	19	6	69.88	
Al-Ahli	3 October 2016	20 June 2017	37	24	6	7	64.86	
Zamalek	3 July 2018	1 June 2019	51	30	14	7	58.82	
Al-Ahli	16 October 2019	17 February 2020	16	10	2	4	62.50	
Schalke 04	27 December 2020	28 February 2021	11	1	2	8	9.09	
Zamalek	15 December 2024	13 February 2025	14	9	3	2	64.29	
Total			1,074	597	260	217	55.59	—

== Honours ==
=== Player ===
Grasshopper

- Swiss League Cup: 1974–75

=== Manager ===
Grasshopper

- Swiss Super League: 1994–95, 1995–96
- Swiss Cup: 1993–94

Basel

- Swiss Super League: 2001–02, 2003–04, 2004–05, 2007–08
- Swiss Cup: 2001–02, 2002–03, 2006–07, 2007–08

Al-Ahli

- Saudi Crown Prince Cup: 2014–15
- Saudi Professional League: 2015–16
- King Cup: 2016

Zamalek

- Saudi-Egyptian Super Cup: 2018
- CAF Confederation Cup: 2018–19

Individual

- Swiss Super League Coach of the Year: 1994, 1996, 1997, 2001, 2002, 2003, 2004, 2005, 2008
