= 2022–23 in Swiss football =

Football in Switzerland
- Season: 2022–23

Men's football
- Super League: Young Boys
- Challenge League: Yverdon-Sport
- Promotion League: Luzern II
- Swiss Cup: Young Boys

Women's football
- Swiss Women's Super League: Zürich
- Swiss Women's Cup: Servette Chênois

The following is a summary of the 2022–23 season of competitive football in Switzerland.

== National teams ==
=== Men's senior national team ===
The men's national team participated in three tournaments during the 2022–23 season. The following table shows their record in each competition for games played during the 2022–23 season.

Competition	First match	Last match	Starting round	Final position	Record							
Competition	First match	Last match	Starting round	Final position	Pld	W	D	L	GF	GA	GD	Win %
UEFA Nations League A	24 September 2022	27 September 2022	Matchday 1	3rd	2	2	0	0	4	2	+2	100.00
FIFA World Cup	24 November 2022	2 December 2022	Group stage	Last 16	4	2	0	2	5	9	−4	50.00
UEFA Euro Qualifying	25 March 2023	19 June 2023	Matchday 1	1st	4	3	1	0	12	3	+9	75.00
International Friendlies	17 November 2022	17 November 2022		–	1	0	0	1	0	2	−2	0.00
Total					11	7	1	3	21	16	+5	63.64

Last updated: complete
Source: Soccerway

==== Friendlies ====
17 November 2022	Ghana	2–0	Switzerland	Abu Dhabi, United Arab Emirates
14:00 UTC+4	Salisu 70'; Semenyo 74'	Report		Stadium: Zayed Sports City Stadium; Attendance: 650; Referee: Ahmed Issa (United Arab Emirates)

==== UEFA Nations League ====
Group 2

Pos	Team	Pld	W	D	L	GF	GA	GD	Pts	Qualification or relegation	(Spain)	(Portugal)	(Switzerland)	(Czech Republic)
1	Spain	6	3	2	1	8	5	+3	11	Qualification for Nations League Finals	—	1–1	1–2	2–0
2	Portugal	6	3	1	2	11	3	+8	10		0–1	—	4–0	2–0
3	Switzerland	6	3	0	3	6	9	−3	9		0–1	1–0	—	2–1
4	Czech Republic (R)	6	1	1	4	5	13	−8	4	Relegation to League B	2–2	0–4	2–1	—

Source: UEFA
(R) Relegated

24 September 2022	Spain	1–2	Switzerland	Spain
20:45		Report

27 September 2022	Switzerland	2–1	Czech Republic	St. Gallen, Switzerland
20:45		Report		Stadium: Kybunpark

==== 2022 FIFA World Cup ====
===== Group stage =====
Pos	Team	Pld	W	D	L	GF	GA	GD	Pts	Qualification
1	Brazil	3	2	0	1	3	1	+2	6	Advance to knockout stage
2	Switzerland	3	2	0	1	4	3	+1	6	Advance to knockout stage
3	Cameroon	3	1	1	1	4	4	0	4	
4	Serbia	3	0	1	2	5	8	−3	1	

Source: FIFA
Rules for classification: Group stage tiebreakers

24 November 2022	Switzerland	1–0	Cameroon	Al Wakrah, Qatar
13:00 UTC+3	Embolo 48'	Report		Stadium: Al Janoub Stadium; Attendance: 39,089; Referee: Facundo Tello (Argentina)

28 November 2022	Brazil	1–0	Switzerland	Doha, Qatar
19:00 UTC+3	Casemiro 83'	Report		Stadium: Stadium 974; Attendance: 43,649; Referee: Iván Barton (El Salvador)

2 December 2022	Serbia	2–3	Switzerland	Doha, Qatar
22:00 UTC+3	A. Mitrović 26'; Vlahović 35'	Report	Shaqiri 20'; Embolo 44'; Freuler 48'	Stadium: Stadium 974; Attendance: 41,378; Referee: Fernando Rapallini (Argentina)

===== Knockout stage =====
6 December 2022 R16	Portugal	6–1	Switzerland	Lusail, Qatar
22:00 AST (UTC+03:00)	Ramos 17', 51', 67'; Pepe 33'; Guerreiro 55'; Leão 90+2'	Report	Akanji 58'	Stadium: Lusail Iconic Stadium; Attendance: 83,720; Referee: César Arturo Ramos (Mexico)

==== UEFA Euro 2024 qualifying ====
===== Group stage =====
Pos	Team	Pld	W	D	L	GF	GA	GD	Pts	Qualification	(Romania)	(Switzerland)	(Israel)	(Belarus)	(Kosovo)	(Andorra)
1	Romania	10	6	4	0	16	5	+11	22	Qualify for final tournament	—	1–0	1–1	2–1	2–0	4–0
2	Switzerland	10	4	5	1	22	11	+11	17	Qualify for final tournament	2–2	—	3–0	3–3	1–1	3–0
3	Israel	10	4	3	3	11	11	0	15	Advance to play-offs via Nations League	1–2	1–1	—	1–0	1–1	2–1
4	Belarus	10	3	3	4	9	14	−5	12		0–0	0–5	1–2	—	2–1	1–0
5	Kosovo	10	2	5	3	10	10	0	11		0–0	2–2	1–0	0–1	—	1–1
6	Andorra	10	0	2	8	3	20	−17	2		0–2	1–2	0–2	0–0	0–3	—

Source: UEFA
Rules for classification: Qualification tiebreakers

25 March 2023 UEFA Euro 2024 qualifying	Belarus	0–5	Switzerland	Novi Sad, Serbia
18:00 UTC+1		Report	Steffen 4', 17', 29'; Xhaka 62'; Amdouni 65'	Stadium: Karađorđe Stadium; Attendance: 0 (Note: Due to the Belarusian country's involvement in the Russian invasion of Ukraine, Belarus are required to play their home matches at neutral venues and behind closed doors until further notice.); Referee: Alejandro Hernández Hernández (Spain)

28 March 2023 UEFA Euro 2024 qualifying	Switzerland	3–0	Israel	Geneva, Switzerland
20:45 UTC+1		Report		Stadium: Stade de Genève

16 June 2023 UEFA Euro 2024 qualifying	Andorra	1–2	Switzerland	Andorra la Vella, Andorra
20:45 UTC+2		Report		Stadium: Estadi Nacional

19 June 2023 UEFA Euro 2024 qualifying	Switzerland	2–2	Romania	Lucerne, Switzerland
20:45 UTC+2		Report		Stadium: Swissporarena

=== Men's U21 national team ===
Competition	First match	Last match	Starting round	Final position	Record							
Competition	First match	Last match	Starting round	Final position	Pld	W	D	L	GF	GA	GD	Win %
2023 U21 Euro	22 June 2023	21 April 2023	Matchday 1	Last Eight	4	1	0	3	6	10	−4	25.00
International Friendlies	22 September 2022	24 September 2022	–	–	2	1	0	1	4	4	+0	50.00
Total					6	2	0	4	10	14	−4	33.33

Last updated: 1 July 2023
Source: Soccerway

==== Friendlies ====
22 September 2022	Japan	1–2	Switzerland
22:00

24 September 2022	Norway	3–2	Switzerland
22:00

==== 2023 UEFA European Under-21 Championship ====
===== Group stage =====
Pos	Team	Pld	W	D	L	GF	GA	GD	Pts	Qualification
1	France	3	3	0	0	7	2	+5	9	Advance to knockout stage
2	Switzerland	3	1	0	2	5	8	−3	3 (Note: Tied on head-to-head points (3) and head-to-head goal difference (0). Head-to-head goals scored: Switzerland 4, Italy 3, Norway 2.)	Advance to knockout stage
3	Italy	3	1	0	2	4	5	−1	3	
4	Norway	3	1	0	2	2	3	−1	3	

Source: UEFA
Rules for classification: Tiebreakers
Notes:

22 June 2023	Norway	1–2	Switzerland	Cluj-Napoca
19:00	Ceide 19'	Report	Ndoye 36'; Imeri 56'	Stadium: Stadionul Dr. Constantin Rădulescu; Attendance: 1,279; Referee: João Pinheiro (Portugal)

25 June 2023	Switzerland	2–3	Italy	Cluj-Napoca
19:00	Imeri 47'; Amdouni 52'	Report	Pirola 6'; Gnonto 11'; Parisi 45+4'	Stadium: Cluj Arena; Attendance: 4,339; Referee: Mohammed Al-Hakim (Sweden)

28 June 2023	Switzerland	1–4	France	Cluj-Napoca
21:45	Ndoye 35'	Report	Gouiri 16' (pen.); Barcola 65'; Cherki 76'; Caqueret 81'	Stadium: Stadionul Dr. Constantin Rădulescu; Attendance: 1,652; Referee: Morten Krogh (Denmark)

==== Knockout phase ====
1 July 2023	Spain	2–1 (a.e.t.)	Switzerland	Bucharest
22:00	Gómez 68'; Miranda 103'	Report	Amdouni 90+1'	Stadium: Stadionul Rapid-Giulești; Attendance: 3,861; Referee: Erik Lambrechts (Belgium)

=== Overview ===
Competition	First match	Last match	Starting round	Final position	Record							
Competition	First match	Last match	Starting round	Final position	Pld	W	D	L	GF	GA	GD	Win %
2022 Women's Euro	9 July 2022	21 April 2024	Matchday 1	3rd in Group C	3	0	1	2	4	10	−6	0.00
2023 WWC Qualifier	2 September 2022	6 September 2022	Matchday 9	Qualified	3	3	0	0	19	1	+18	100.00
International Friendlies	11 November 2022	30 June 2023	–	–	6	0	4	2	6	8	−2	0.00
Total					12	3	5	4	29	19	+10	25.00

Last updated: 22 June 2023
Source: Soccerway

==== Friendlies ====
11 November 2022 Friendly	Switzerland	1–2	Denmark	Schaffhausen, Switzerland
	Reuteler 51'		Bruun 65', 80'	Stadium: Wefox Arena Schaffhausen

17 February Friendly	Poland	0–0	Switzerland	Algeciras, Spain
15:30 UTC+1		Report		Stadium: Estadio Nuevo Mirador; Referee: Jason Barcelo (Gibraltar)

21 February Friendly	Switzerland	1–1	Poland	San Pedro Alcántara, Spain
16:00 UTC+1	Stierli 78'	Report	Pajor 70'	Stadium: Marbella Football Center; Referee: Jason Barcelo (Gibraltar)

6 April Friendly	Switzerland	0–0	China	Luzern, Switzerland
--:-- UTC+2				Stadium: Swissporarena; Attendance: 4,290; Referee: Katalin Kulcsár (Hungary)

11 April Friendly	Switzerland	1–2	Iceland	Zürich, Switzerland
	Piubel 39'		Viggósdóttir 18'; Jónsdóttir 73'	Stadium: Letzigrund; Attendance: 4,023; Referee: Riem Hussein (Germany)

30 June Friendly	Switzerland	3–3	Zambia	Biel, Switzerland
				Stadium: Tissot Arena

==== 2023 FIFA Women's World Cup qualification ====
Pos	Team	Pld	W	D	L	GF	GA	GD	Pts	Qualification	(Italy)	(Switzerland)	(Romania)	(Croatia)	(Lithuania)	(Moldova)
1	Italy	10	9	0	1	40	2	+38	27	2023 FIFA Women's World Cup	—	1–2	2–0	3–0	7–0	3–0
2	Switzerland	10	8	1	1	44	4	+40	25	Play-offs	0–1	—	2–0	5–0	4–1	15–0
3	Romania	10	6	1	3	21	11	+10	19		0–5	1–1	—	2–0	3–0	3–0
4	Croatia	10	3	1	6	6	18	−12	10		0–5	0–2	0–1	—	0–0	4–0
5	Lithuania	10	1	2	7	7	35	−28	5		0–5	0–7	1–7	0–1	—	4–0
6	Moldova	10	0	1	9	1	49	−48	1		0–8	0–6	0–4	0–1	1–1	—

Source: UEFA
Rules for classification: Tiebreakers

2 September 2022	Croatia	0–2	Switzerland	Stadion Branko Čavlović-Čavlek, Karlovac
19:00		Report (FIFA); Report (UEFA)	Bachmann 53'; Calligaris 65'	Referee: Eleni Antoniou (Greece)

6 September 2022	Switzerland	15–0	Moldova	Stade de la Tuilière, Lausanne
18:30	Calligaris 2', 62'; Bachmann 23'; Bühler 38'; Sow 32', 42', 45'; Reuteler 45+3', 45+4', 88'; Xhemaili 53', 75', 81'; Crnogorčević 57', 78' (pen.)	Report (FIFA); Report (UEFA)		Referee: Réka Molnar (Hungary)

===== UEFA play-offs =====
11 October 2022	Switzerland	2–1 (a.e.t.)	Wales	Zürich, Switzerland
	Bachmann 45'; Humm 120+1'	Report	Roberts 19'	Stadium: Letzigrund; Referee: Tess Olofsson (Sweden)

==== UEFA Women's Euro ====
===== Group C =====
Pos	Team	Pld	W	D	L	GF	GA	GD	Pts	Qualification
1	Sweden	3	2	1	0	8	2	+6	7	Advance to knockout stage
2	Netherlands	3	2	1	0	8	4	+4	7	Advance to knockout stage
3	Switzerland	3	0	1	2	4	8	−4	1	
4	Portugal	3	0	1	2	4	10	−6	1	

Source: UEFA
Rules for classification: Group stage tiebreakers

9 July 2022	Portugal	2–2	Switzerland	Leigh, England
	Gomes 58'; J. Silva 65'	Report	Sow 2'; Kiwic 5'	Stadium: Leigh Sports Village; Attendance: 5,902; Referee: Jana Adámková (Czech Republic)

13 July 2022	Sweden	2–1	Switzerland	Sheffield, England
	Rolfö 53'; Bennison 79'	Report	Bachmann 55'	Stadium: Bramall Lane; Attendance: 12,914; Referee: Marta Huerta de Aza (Spain)

17 July 2022	Switzerland	1–4	Netherlands	Sheffield, England
	Reuteler 53'	Report	Crnogorčević 49' (o.g.); Leuchter 84', 90+5'; Pelova 89'	Stadium: Bramall Lane; Attendance: 22,596; Referee: Iuliana Demetrescu (Romania)

== Club Football ==
=== Men ===
==== Swiss Cup ====
BSC Young Boys won the Swiss Cup on 4 June 2023 and thus achieved their third domestic double.

4 June 2023
14:00 CEST (UTC+1)
Final

BSC Young Boys	3–2	FC Lugano
Nsame 20', 45+3'; Elia 85'	Report	53' Bottani; 87' Steffen

Stadion Wankdorf, Bern
Attendance: 31,500
Referee: Lukas Fähndrich

==== Credit Suisse Super League ====
BSC Young Boys were crowned Swiss champions. They had secured championship already after matchday 31, on 30 April 2023. It is their fourth championship victory in five years.

Pos	Team	Pld	W	D	L	GF	GA	GD	Pts	Qualification or relegation
1	Young Boys (C)	36	21	11	4	82	30	+52	74	Qualification for the Champions League play-off round
2	Servette	36	14	16	6	53	48	+5	58	Qualification for the Champions League second qualifying round
3	Lugano	36	15	12	9	59	47	+12	57	Qualification for the Europa League play-off round
4	Luzern	36	13	11	12	56	52	+4	50	Qualification for the Europa Conference League second qualifying round
5	Basel	36	11	14	11	51	50	+1	47	Qualification for the Europa Conference League second qualifying round
6	St. Gallen	36	11	12	13	66	52	+14	45	
7	Grasshopper	36	12	8	16	56	64	−8	44	
8	Zürich	36	10	14	12	41	55	−14	44	
9	Winterthur	36	8	8	20	32	66	−34	32	
10	Sion (R)	36	7	10	19	41	73	−32	31	Qualification for the relegation play-off

Source: Swiss Super League
Rules for classification: 1) Points; 2) Goal difference; 3) Goals scored; 4) Head-to-head goal difference; 5) Away goals scored; 6) Draw.
(C) Champions; (R) Relegated

==== dieci Challenge League ====
Yverdon-Sport FC were crowned champions of the Challenge League. They had already secured promotion on matchday 35. FC Lausanne-Sport will join them in the Super League for the next season.

Pos	Team	Pld	W	D	L	GF	GA	GD	Pts	Promotion or qualification
1	Yverdon (C, P)	36	20	6	10	64	53	+11	66	Promotion to Swiss Super League
2	Lausanne (P)	36	17	10	9	58	43	+15	61	Promotion to Swiss Super League
3	Lausanne-Ouchy (Note: Lausanne-Ouchy were deducted 3 points on 1 November 2022, due to license violations. This decision was overturned following the team's appeal on 22 November 2022.) (O, P)	36	17	9	10	70	53	+17	60	Qualification for the promotion play-off
4	Aarau	36	15	12	9	63	57	+6	57	
5	Wil	36	16	8	12	62	52	+10	56	
6	Thun	36	12	13	11	62	55	+7	49	
7	Schaffhausen	36	12	8	16	51	59	−8	44	
8	Vaduz	36	7	16	13	54	56	−2	37	Qualification for the Europa Conference League first qualifying round (Note: Vaduz qualified for the Europa Conference League first qualifying round by winning the 2022–23 Liechtenstein Cup.)
9	Bellinzona	36	11	4	21	38	71	−33	37	
10	Xamax (O)	36	4	12	20	42	65	−23	24	Qualification for the relegation play-off

Source: Swiss Challenge League
Rules for classification: 1) Points; 2) Goal difference; 3) Goals scored; 4) Head-to-head goal difference; 5) Away goals scored; 6) Draw.
(C) Champions; (O) Play-off winners; (P) Promoted

==== YAPEAL Promotion League ====
Pos	Team	Pld	W	D	L	GF	GA	GD	Pts	Promotion, qualification or relegation
1	FC Luzern II (Note: Reserve teams are ineligible to qualify for promotion and Swiss Cup.) (C)	34	24	4	6	95	53	+42	74	
2	Stade Nyonnais (P)	34	21	5	8	83	45	+38	66	Promotion to Swiss Challenge League and qualification for 2023–24 Swiss Cup
3	FC Baden (P)	34	18	6	10	61	48	+13	58	Promotion to Swiss Challenge League and qualification for 2023–24 Swiss Cup
4	SC Cham (Note: SC Cham are ineligible for promotion as they did not apply for an SFL license.)	34	17	5	12	60	47	+13	54	Qualification for 2023–24 Swiss Cup
5	FC Rapperswil-Jona	34	17	5	12	59	54	+5	54	Qualification for promotion play-off and 2023–24 Swiss Cup
6	Étoile Carouge FC	34	15	9	10	63	38	+25	52	Qualification for 2023–24 Swiss Cup
7	SC Brühl	34	14	12	8	59	45	+14	52	Qualification for 2023–24 Swiss Cup
8	FC Breitenrain	34	15	8	11	57	57	0	51	Qualification for 2023–24 Swiss Cup
9	FC Basel II	34	12	10	12	53	57	−4	44	
10	SC Kriens	34	13	6	15	53	58	−5	43	
11	BSC Young Boys II	34	11	8	15	64	67	−3	39	
12	FC Zürich II	34	11	7	16	53	56	−3	38	
13	FC Bulle	34	11	6	17	49	57	−8	37	
14	FC Bavois	34	10	9	15	45	65	−20	37	
15	FC St. Gallen II	34	9	7	18	57	86	−29	32	
16	FC Biel-Bienne	34	6	10	18	32	60	−28	26	
17	SC YF Juventus (R)	34	4	5	25	27	77	−50	15	Relegation to the 1. Liga Classic
18	FC Chiasso (Note: FC Chiasso filed for bankruptcy on 14 February 2023. They are placed at the bottom of the league with 34 points. All of their games are set to 0–0 with 0 points awarded to their opponents.)	34	0	34	0	0	0	0	34	Withdrew from the league

Source: Erste Liga - Match center
Rules for classification: 1) Points; 2) Goal difference; 3) Goals scored; 4) Head-to-head goal difference; 5) Away goals scored; 6) Draw.
(C) Champions; (P) Promoted; (R) Relegated

==== Relegation/Promotion play-offs ====
===== Super League-Challenge League play-off =====
Lausanne-Ouchy wins 6–2 on aggregate and win promotion, while Sion are relegated.

3 June 2023	Sion	0–2	Lausanne-Ouchy	Stade Tourbillon, Sion
18:00 CEST (UTC+2)		Report	26' Mulaj; 57' Bamba	Attendance: 9,050; Referee: Luca Cibelli; Assistant referees: Sandro Schärer (VAR)

6 June 2023	Lausanne-Ouchy	4–2	Sion	Stade Olympique de la Pontaise, Lausanne
20:30 CEST (UTC+2)	Mulaj 6', 89'; Ajdini 34'; Okou 81'	Report	23' Zuffi; 39' (pen.) Grgic	Attendance: 10,754; Referee: Urs Schnyder; Assistant referees: Esther Staubli (VAR)

===== Challenge League-Promotion League play-off =====
Xamax beat Rapperswil-Jona 6–1 on aggregate and remain in the Challenge League.

31 May 2023	Rapperswil-Jona	1–3	Xamax	Stadium Grünfeld, Rapperswil
19:30 CEST (UTC+2)	Volkart 54'	Report	7' Aliu; 20' Bakayoko; 26' Del Toro	Attendance: 2,154

3 June 2023	Xamax	3–0	Rapperswil-Jona	Stade de la Maladière, Neuchâtel
19:00 CEST (UTC+2)	Hammerich 58'; Del Toro 69'; Pinga 73'	Report		Attendance: 6,414

=== Women ===
==== Axa Women's Super League ====
On 2 June 2023, FC Zürich Frauen became Swiss women's champion, beating Servette FC Chênois Féminin 0–3 in the play-off final.

2 June 2023
20:00
Play-off Final

Servette FC Chênois Féminin	0–3	FC Zürich Frauen
	Report	Höbinger 45'; Humm 75'; Pilgrim 90+2'

Kybunpark
Attendance: 1,937

Pos	Team	Pld	W	D	L	GF	GA	GD	Pts	Qualification or relegation	SFC	ZUR	GCZ	STG	YBF	BAS	LUZ	AAR	YVE	RAP
1	Servette Chênois	18	16	2	0	56	15	+41	50	Advance to Playoffs		1–1	2–1	2–1	3–0	5–2	3–1	6–1	6–0	4–0
2	Zürich (C, O)	18	14	2	2	68	20	+48	44	Advance to Playoffs	2–4		3–1	6–1	7–2	8–0	4–1	3–0	6–0	7–0
3	Grasshopper	18	12	2	4	60	29	+31	38	Advance to Playoffs	2–2	2–0		3–4	8–2	4–5	3–1	5–1	3–1	5–0
4	St. Gallen	18	9	2	7	37	35	+2	29	Advance to Playoffs	2–3	3–5	2–2		2–0	3–1	1–3	3–2	6–0	3–1
5	YB Frauen	18	8	3	7	40	34	+6	27	Advance to Playoffs	1–2	1–2	2–3	4–0		2–2	1–0	0–0	5–0	3–1
6	Basel	18	5	7	6	31	35	−4	22	Advance to Playoffs	1–2	2–2	3–4	2–0	1–1		1–1	0–0	3–0	3–0
7	Luzern	18	6	1	11	28	33	−5	19	Advance to Playoffs	0–1	0–2	0–5	0–3	2–3	1–0		6–0	5–0	3–0
8	Aarau	18	4	4	10	20	44	−24	16	Advance to Playoffs	0–4	2–5	0–2	0–1	0–5	0–0	3–1		1–1	5–1
9	Yverdon (R)	18	1	3	14	4	59	−55	6	Relegation Playoff	0–2	0–3	0–5	0–1	0–1	1–1	1–0	0–3		0–0
10	Rapperswil-Jona (O)	18	1	2	15	18	58	−40	5	Relegation Playoff	0–4	0–2	1–2	1–1	1–7	1–4	2–3	1–2	8–0	

Source: Meisterschaft
Legend: Blue = home team win; Yellow = draw; Red = away team win.
Rules for classification: 1) Points; 2) Goal difference; 3) Goals scored; 4) Head-to-head goal difference; 5) Away goals scored; 6) Draw.
(C) Champions; (O) Play-off winners; (R) Relegated

Quarter-finals
Aarau	0	1	1
Servette	4	8	12
Young Boys	2	0	2
St. Gallen	3	4	7
Basel	0	0	0
Grasshopper	3	1	4
Luzern	0	0	0
Zürich	7	1	8

Semi-finals
Servette	2	2	4
St. Gallen	1	2	3
Grasshopper	2	1	3
Zürich	3	5	8

Final
Servette	0
Zürich	3

==== Promotion/Relegation play-off ====
Pos	Team	Pld	W	D	L	GF	GA	GD	Pts		RAP	TBO	YVE	SIO
1	FC Rapperswil-Jona	5	4	1	0	7	1	+6	13	2023–24 Swiss Women's Super League			2–1	3–0
2	Frauenteam Thun Berner-Oberland (P)	5	3	1	1	5	3	+2	10	2023–24 Swiss Women's Super League	0–1		1–1	1–0
3	FC Yverdon Féminin (R)	5	1	2	2	8	7	+1	5	2023–24 Nationalliga B	0–0	1–2		5–2
4	FC Sion	5	0	0	5	2	11	−9	0	2023–24 Nationalliga B	0–1	0–1		

Updated to match(es) played on 3 June 2023. Source: Meisterschaft
Legend: Blue = home team win; Yellow = draw; Red = away team win.
Rules for classification: 1) Points; 2) Goal difference; 3) Goals scored; 4) Head-to-head goal difference; 5) Away goals scored; 6) Draw.
(P) Promoted; (R) Relegated

== Swiss Clubs in Europe ==
=== UEFA Champions League ===
Reigning Swiss champions FC Zürich enter the Champions League in the second qualifying round.

==== Qualifying phase and play-off round ====
===== Second qualifying round =====
Team 1	Agg.	Team 2	1st leg	2nd leg
Qarabağ (Azerbaijan)	5–4	(Switzerland) Zürich	3–2	2–2 (a.e.t.)

=== UEFA Europa League ===
FC Zürich are transferred to the Europa League third qualifying round after losing in Champions League qualifying.

==== Qualifying phase and play-off round ====
===== Third qualifying round =====
Team 1	Agg.	Team 2	1st leg	2nd leg
Linfield (Northern Ireland)	0–5	(Switzerland) Zürich	0–2	0–3

===== Play-off round =====
Team 1	Agg.	Team 2	1st leg	2nd leg
Zürich (Switzerland)	3–1	(Scotland) Heart of Midlothian	2–1	1–0

==== Group stage ====
Pos	Team	Pld	W	D	L	GF	GA	GD	Pts	Qualification	ARS	PSV	BOD	ZUR
1	(England) Arsenal	6	5	0	1	8	3	+5	15	Advance to round of 16	—	1–0	3–0	1–0
2	(Netherlands) PSV Eindhoven	6	4	1	1	15	4	+11	13	Advance to knockout round play-offs	2–0	—	1–1	5–0
3	(Norway) Bodø/Glimt	6	1	1	4	5	10	−5	4	Transfer to Europa Conference League	0–1	1–2	—	2–1
4	(Switzerland) Zürich	6	1	0	5	5	16	−11	3		1–2	1–5	2–1	—

Source: UEFA
Rules for classification: Group stage tiebreakers

=== UEFA Europa Conference League ===
BSC Young Boys and FC Basel enter the UECL in the second qualifying round, as runners-up and third placed teams of the 2021–22 Swiss Super League. FC Lugano enter in the third qualifying round, as winners of the 2021–22 Swiss Cup. Basel nearly made history as the first Swiss team to advance to the final of a European competition, only losing to ACF Fiorentina in the final minutes of extra time on 18 May 2023.

==== Qualifying phase and play-off round ====
===== Second qualifying round =====
Team 1	Agg.	Team 2	1st leg	2nd leg
Liepāja (Latvia)	0–4	(Switzerland) Young Boys	0–1	0–3
Basel (Switzerland)	3–1	(Northern Ireland) Crusaders	2–0	1–1

===== Third qualifying round =====
Team 1	Agg.	Team 2	1st leg	2nd leg
KuPS (Finland)	0–5	(Switzerland) Young Boys	0–2	0–3
Brøndby (Denmark)	2–2 (1–3 p)	(Switzerland) Basel	1–0	1–2 (a.e.t.)
Lugano (Switzerland)	1–5	(Israel) Hapoel Be'er Sheva	0–2	1–3

===== Play-off round =====
Team 1	Agg.	Team 2	1st leg	2nd leg
CSKA Sofia (Bulgaria)	1–2	(Switzerland) Basel	1–0	0–2
Young Boys (Switzerland)	1–1 (1–3 p)	(Belgium) Anderlecht	0–1	1–0 (a.e.t.)

==== Group stage ====
===== Group H =====
Pos	Team	Pld	W	D	L	GF	GA	GD	Pts	Qualification	SLO	BSL	PYU	ZAL
1	(Slovakia) Slovan Bratislava	6	3	2	1	9	7	+2	11 (Note: Head-to-head points: Slovan Bratislava 4, Basel 1.)	Advance to round of 16	—	3–3	2–1	0–0
2	(Switzerland) Basel	6	3	2	1	11	9	+2	11	Advance to knockout round play-offs	0–2	—	3–1	2–2
3	(Armenia) Pyunik	6	2	0	4	8	9	−1	6		2–0	1–2	—	2–0
4	(Lithuania) Žalgiris	6	1	2	3	5	8	−3	5		1–2	0–1	2–1	—

Source: UEFA

==== Knockout phase ====
===== Knockout round play-offs =====
Team 1	Agg.	Team 2	1st leg	2nd leg
Trabzonspor (Turkey)	1–2	(Switzerland) Basel	1–0	0–2

===== Round of 16 =====
Team 1	Agg.	Team 2	1st leg	2nd leg
Basel (Switzerland)	4–4 (4–1 p)	(Slovakia) Slovan Bratislava	2–2	2–2 (a.e.t.)

===== Quarter-finals =====
Team 1	Agg.	Team 2	1st leg	2nd leg
Basel (Switzerland)	4–3	(France) Nice	2–2	2–1 (a.e.t.)

===== Semi-finals =====
Team 1	Agg.	Team 2	1st leg	2nd leg
Fiorentina (Italy)	4–3	(Switzerland) Basel	1–2	3–1 (a.e.t.)

=== UEFA Women's Champions League ===
FC Zürich Frauen and Servette FC Chênois Féminin enter the UWCL in the first qualifying round. Zürich enters qualifying in the champions path, as Swiss champion, while Servette enter in the league path, as winner of the regular season.

==== Qualifying round ====
===== Round 1 =====
Champions Path Tournament 4

Hosted by Apollon Limassol.

Semi-finals
18 August
(Cyprus) Apollon Limassol	3
(Latvia) Rīgas FS	0
18 August
(Switzerland) Zürich	6
(Faroe Islands) KÍ	0

Final
21 August
(Cyprus) Apollon Limassol	0
(Switzerland) Zürich	1
Third place
21 August
(Latvia) Rīgas FS (a.e.t.)	2
(Faroe Islands) KÍ	1

League Path Tournament 1

Hosted by Glasgow City.

Semi-finals
18 August
(France) Paris FC	3
(Switzerland) Servette	0
18 August
(Scotland) Glasgow City	1
(Italy) Roma	3

Final
21 August
(France) Paris FC	0 (4)
(Italy) Roma (a.e.t.) (p)	0 (5)
Third place
21 August
(Switzerland) Servette	1
(Scotland) Glasgow City	0

===== Round 2 =====
Champions Path
Team 1	Agg.	Team 2	1st leg	2nd leg
SFK 2000 (Bosnia and Herzegovina)	0–10	(Switzerland) Zürich	0–7	0–3

==== Group stage ====
Pos	Team	Pld	W	D	L	GF	GA	GD	Pts	Qualification	ARS	LYO	JUV	ZÜR
1	(England) Arsenal	6	4	1	1	19	5	+14	13	Advance to Quarter-finals	—	0–1	1–0	3–1
2	(France) Lyon	6	3	2	1	10	6	+4	11	Advance to Quarter-finals	1–5	—	0–0	4–0
3	(Italy) Juventus	6	2	3	1	9	3	+6	9		1–1	1–1	—	5–0
4	(Switzerland) Zürich	6	0	0	6	2	26	−24	0		1–9	0–3	0–2	—

Source: UEFA
Rules for classification: Group stage tiebreakers

=== UEFA Youth League ===
==== Domestic Champions Path ====
===== First round =====
Team 1	Agg.	Team 2	1st leg	2nd leg
Young Boys (Switzerland)	5–2	(Slovenia) Domžale	3–0	2–2

===== Second round =====
Team 1	Agg.	Team 2	1st leg	2nd leg
Young Boys (Switzerland)	3–3 (9–8 p)	(Sweden) AIK	0–3	3–0

==== Knockout rounds ====
===== Playoffs =====
Team 1	Score	Team 2
Young Boys (Switzerland)	2–3	(Austria) Red Bull Salzburg

Preceded by 2021–22	Seasons in Swiss football	Succeeded by 2023–24
