= Oliwia Woś =

Polish footballer (born 1999)

Personal information
- Full name: Oliwia Maria Woś
- Date of birth: 15 August 1999 (age 27)
- Place of birth: Olesno, Poland
- Height: 1.82 m (6 ft 0 in)
- Position: Defender

Team information
- Current team: Bristol City
- Number: 15

Youth career
- FSV Witten
- –2016: VfL Bochum

College career
Years	Team	Apps	(Gls)
2018	Wake Forest Demon Deacons	16	(0)
2019–2022	Indiana Hoosiers	48	(1)

Senior career*
Years	Team	Apps	(Gls)
2016	VfL Bochum	2	(0)
2016–2017	Herforder SV	21	(1)
2017–2018	Arminia Bielefeld	22	(0)
2022–2024	Zürich	38	(7)
2024–2025	Basel	20	(4)
2025–2026	1. FC Nürnberg	16	(1)
2026–	Bristol City	11	(0)

International career^{‡}
2016–2017	Poland U17	3	(0)
2017–2018	Poland U19	12	(1)
2023	Poland U23	1	(0)
2017–	Poland	36	(0)
- * Club domestic league appearances and goals as of 10:49, 6 October 2026 (UTC) ‡ National team caps and goals as of 22:36, 13 October 2026 (UTC)

Oliwia Maria Woś (born 15 August 1999) is a Polish professional footballer who plays as a defender for Women's Super League 2 club Bristol City and the Poland national team.

Woś has played in America, Germany, Switzerland and England, and was named in the Poland squad for the UEFA Women's Euro 2025.

== College career ==
Woś was a regular player for Indiana Hoosiers, being named to the Big Ten Preseason Honors List in 2019 and the All-Big Ten Second Team during the 2020–21 season. During the 2020–21 season, she played every single minute and assisted twice.

== Club career ==
Born in the Opole region, Woś was raised in Germany. She has dual Polish-German citizenship, though chose to represent Poland. Woś started her career as a youth at FSV Witten.

Woś joined Herforder SV in 2016. She made her league debut for the club against Turbine Potsdam's reserves. Woś made 21 league appearances and scored 1 goal during her time for the club.

In 2022, Woś was announced at FC Zürich Frauen on a two-year contract. She won the 2022–23 Swiss Women's Super League with the club, playing in 14 league matches. During her time with the club, she played in the UEFA Women's Champions League, making three appearances.

On 26 June 2024, Woś was announced at FC Basel on a two-year contract.

On 10 June 2025, Woś was announced at 1. FC Nürnberg. She was signed after scoring 5 goals and assisting 3 times in 25 matches for FC Basel.

On 3 February 2026, Woś signed with Bristol City for an undisclosed fee under a three and a half year deal, pending international clearance. She made her debut for the Women's Super League 2 club in a 2–1 loss against Crystal Palace on 8 February 2026. Her first start for Bristol came in a 2–0 WSL2 loss against Southampton on 15 February 2026.

== International career ==
In 2017, Woś made her senior Poland international debut against Estonia.

On 13 June 2025, Woś was called up to the Poland squad for the UEFA Women's Euro 2025.

== Career statistics ==
=== Club ===
As of match played 26 September 2026

Appearances and goals by club, season and competition
Club	Season	League			National cup (Note: Includes DFB-Pokal Frauen, Swiss Women's Cup, FA Women's Cup)		Continental		Playoffs		Total	
Club	Season	Division	Apps	Goals	Apps	Goals	Apps	Goals	Apps	Goals	Apps	Goals
VfL Bochum II	2015–16	Verbandsliga Westfalen	1	0	—		—		—		1	0
VfL Bochum	2015–16	Regionalliga West	2	0	0	0	—		—		2	0
Herforder SV	2016–17	2. Bundesliga	21	1	1	0	—		—		22	1
Arminia Bielefeld	2017–18	2. Bundesliga	22	0	3	0	—		—		25	0
Zürich	2022–23	Swiss Super League	14	2	3	0	6 (Note: Appearances in UEFA Women's Champions League)	1	1	1	24	3
Zürich	2023–24	Swiss Super League	18	4	2	3	2	0	5	0	27	7
Zürich	Total		32	6	5	4	8	1	6	1	51	10
Basel	2024–25	Swiss Super League	18	4	5	1	—		2	0	25	5
1. FC Nürnberg	2025–26	Bundesliga	16	1	1	1	—		—		17	2
Bristol City	2025–26	Women's Super League 2	8	0	1	0	—		—		9	0
Bristol City	2026–27	Women's Super League 2	3	0	0	0	—		—		3	0
Bristol City	Total		11	0	1	0	—		—		12	10
Career total			123	12	16	4	8	1	8	1	155	18

=== International ===
As of match played 13 October 2026

Appearances and goals by national team and year
National team	Year	Apps	Goals
Poland	2017	1	0
Poland	2022	1	0
Poland	2023	4	0
Poland	2024	11	0
Poland	2025	11	0
Poland	2026	8	0
Total		36	0

== Honours ==
Zürich

- Swiss Super League: 2022–23
