= 2024–25 Swiss Women's Super League =

Swiss women's football league season

Swiss Women's Super League
- Season: 2024–25
- Dates: 9 August 2024 – 17 May 2025
- Champions: BSC YB Frauen
- Champions League: BSC YB Frauen
- Europa Cup: GC Zürich
- Matches: 25
- Goals: 78 (3.12 per match)
- Top goalscorer: (United States) Courtney Strode (Switzerland) Stephanie Waeber (10 goals)
- Biggest home win: FC St. Gallen 1879 5–0 FC Aarau; 24 August 2024
- Biggest away win: Thun Berner-Oberland 1–8 GC Zürich; 17 August 2024
- Highest scoring: Thun Berner-Oberland 1–8 GC Zürich; 17 August 2024
- Longest winning run: 4 matches Servette Chênois
- Longest unbeaten run: 5 matches GC Zürich; FC Zürich
- Longest winless run: 5 matches Thun Berner-Oberland
- Longest losing run: 5 matches Thun Berner-Oberland
- Highest attendance: 4,033; FC Basel 1893 2–1 BSC YB Frauen; 9 August 2024
- Lowest attendance: 50; Thun Berner-Oberland 0–3 FC St. Gallen 1879; 31 August 2024
- Attendance: 12,226 (489 per match)
- All statistics correct as of 14 September 2024.

The 2024–25 season of the Super League, also known as AXA Women's Super League for sponsorship reasons, is the 55th edition of the Swiss top-tier women's football league.

Servette Chênois are the defending champions, having won their second title in the 2023–24 season.

The 2024–25 season has started on 9 August 2024 with FC Basel 1893 hosting BSC YB Frauen. The regular season is set to conclude on 22 March 2025, followed by the play-offs.

== Tiebreakers for league ranking ==
The following criteria are applied to determine the order of the teams in all rounds of the leagues:

1. The total number of points;
2. Goal difference in all league matches;
3. Number of goals scored in all league matches;
4. Goal difference in head-to-head matches;
5. Number of away goals scored in all league matches;

== Teams ==
Locations of teams in the 2024–25 Super League.

The home grounds of the ten teams participating in the 2024–25 season were confirmed on 2 August 2024.

Team	Home city	Home ground	Capacity	2023–24 finish
FC Aarau	Aarau	Sportanlage Schachen	1,500	8th
FC Basel 1893	Münchenstein	Leichtathletik-Stadion, St. Jakob	6,000	3rd
GC Zürich	Niederhasli	GC/Campus	1,300	5th
FC Luzern	Luzern	Leichtathletik-Stadion Hubelmatt	7,000	7th
FC Rapperswil-Jona	Rapperswil-Jona	Stadion Grünfeld	2,700	9th
Servette Chênois	Chêne-Bourg	Stade des Trois-Chêne	4,000	1st
FC St. Gallen 1879	St. Gallen	Espenmoos	5,350	6th
Thun Berner-Oberland	Thun	Stadion Lachen	10,350	10th
BSC YB Frauen	Bern	Stadion Wankdorf	31,500	4th
FC Zürich	Zürich	Heerenschürli	1,120	2nd

=== Team changes ===
There have been no team changes from the 2023–24 season as both FC Rapperswil-Jona and Thun Berner-Oberland managed to save their spots in the 2023–24 qualification round.

== Regular season ==
=== League table ===
Pos	Team	Pld	W	D	L	GF	GA	GD	Pts	Qualification
1	BSC YB Frauen	18	12	3	3	46	18	+28	39	Advances to play-offs
2	FC Basel 1893	18	12	3	3	42	14	+28	39	Advances to play-offs
3	Servette Chênois	18	12	2	4	37	10	+27	38	Advances to play-offs
4	FC St. Gallen 1879	18	9	5	4	33	12	+21	32	Advances to play-offs
5	FC Zürich	18	10	2	6	29	25	+4	32	Advances to play-offs
6	GC Zürich	18	8	4	6	40	24	+16	28	Advances to play-offs
7	FC Aarau	18	8	2	8	24	28	−4	26	Advances to play-offs
8	FC Luzern	18	2	4	12	18	45	−27	10	Advances to play-offs
9	Thun Berner-Oberland	18	2	2	14	16	61	−45	8	Participates in the qualifying round
10	FC Rapperswil-Jona	18	1	1	16	6	54	−48	4	Participates in the qualifying round

Source: AWSL.ch
Rules for classification: Tiebreakers

=== Results ===
Home \ Away	AAR	BAS	GCZ	LUZ	RAP	SER	STG	THU	YBF	ZÜR
FC Aarau		2–1	1–3	4–1	3–1	2–1	1–2	3–1	0–2	2–1
FC Basel 1893	2–0		2–1	3–0	2–0	2–1	2–1	0–0	5–0	2–1
GC Zürich	1–1	2–6		4–3	3–0	0–0	0–1	2–1	0–3	1–1
FC Luzern	1–1	1–6	0–6		0–1	1–1	0–2	1–4	0–1	1–2
FC Rapperswil-Jona	0–1	0–3	0–6	0–3		1–6	0–2	2–2	0–4	1–3
Servette Chênois	2–0	1–2	2–3	1–1	5–0		2–0	2–0	3–0	1–2
FC St. Gallen 1879	5–0	1–1	1–0	0–1	4–0	1–0		4–0	2–2	1–0
Thun Berner-Oberland	1–3	0–3	1–8	1–1	1–0	0–3	0–3		1–7	0–3
BSC YB Frauen	2–0	1–1	1–0	5–1	3–0	0–0	0–0	6–2		4–1
FC Zürich	1–0	1–0	0–0	3–2	3–0	0–2	0–4	5–1	1–4	

Updated to match(es) played on 22 March 2025. Source: AWSL.ch
Legend: Blue = home team win; Yellow = draw; Red = away team win.

== Play-offs ==
The winner of the play-offs secures a spot in the Champions League first qualifying round. The runner-up qualifies for the Europa Cup first qualifying round.

=== Bracket ===
Quarter-finals
2025
Young Boys	2	1	3
Luzern	1	0	1
2025
St. Gallen	1	0	1
FC Zürich	3	0	3
2025
Servette Chenois	1	1	2
GC Zürich	1	2	3
2025
Basel	2	4	6
Aarau	1	0	1

Semi-finals
2025
Young Boys	3	1	4
FC Zürich	1	1	2
2025
GC Zürich	1	4	5
Basel	2	1	3

Final
2025
YB Frauen (p)	2 (6)	0
GC Zürich	1 (5)	1

=== Quarter-finals ===
Team 1	Agg.	Team 2	1st leg	2nd leg
Young Boys Bern	3–1	FC Luzern	2–1	1–0
FC Basel	6–1	FC Aarau	2–1	4–0
Servette Chênois	2–3	Grasshoppers Club Zürich	1–1	1–2
FC St. Gallen	1–3	FC Zürich	1–3	0–0

=== Semi-finals ===
Team 1	Agg.	Team 2	1st leg	2nd leg
Young Boys Bern	4–2	FC Zürich	3–1	1–1
FC Basel	3–5	Grasshoppers Club Zürich	2–1	1–4

=== Final ===
11 May 2025
15:00 CEST (UTC+2)

GC Zürich	1–0	YB Frauen

Letzigrund, Zürich
17 May 2025
17:00 CEST (UTC+2)

YB Frauen	2–1	GC Zürich
Penalties
	6–5

Stadion Wankdorf, Bern

2–2 on aggregate. YB Frauen won 6–5 on penalties.

== Qualifying round ==
Pos	Team	Pld	W	D	L	GF	GA	GD	Pts	Promotion or relegation	THU	RAP	YVE	SCH
1	Thun Berner-Oberland	6	3	3	0	13	7	+6	12	Promotion to 2025–26 Super League		1–1	2–2	3–1
2	Rapperswil-Jona	6	0	6	0	6	6	0	6	Promotion to 2025–26 Super League	1–1		1–1	0–0
3	Yverdon Féminin	6	1	3	2	9	10	−1	6	Relegation to 2025–26 Nationalliga B	2–4	1–1		1–2
4	Schlieren	6	1	2	3	5	10	−5	5	Relegation to 2025–26 Nationalliga B	0–2	2–2	0–2	

Updated to match(es) played on 18 May 2025. Source: AWSL.ch
Rules for classification: Tiebreakers

== Top goalscorers ==
As of 17 May 2025

Rank	Player	Team	Goals
1	(United States) Courtney Strode	BSC YB Frauen	10
1	(Switzerland) Stephanie Waeber	BSC YB Frauen	10
3	(Switzerland) Emanuela Pfister	GC Zürich	9
4	(Switzerland) Janina Egli	GC Zürich	8
4	(Switzerland) Naomi Luyet	BSC YB Frauen	8
4	(Bosnia and Herzegovina) Milena Nikolić	FC Basel 1893	8
7	(Switzerland) Iman Beney	BSC YB Frauen	7
7	(Spain) Paula Serrano	Servette Chênois	7
9	(Sweden) Cassandra Korhonen	Servette Chênois	6
9	(Switzerland) Coumba Sow	FC Basel 1893	6

=== Hat-tricks ===
Player	Club	Against	Result	Date	Round	Report
(Switzerland) Géraldine Ess	GC Zürich	FC Luzern	4–3 (H)	24 August 2024	3	
(Bosnia and Herzegovina) Milena Nikolić	FC Basel 1893	FC Luzern	1–6 (A)	31 August 2024	4	
(Switzerland) Naomi Luyet	BSC YB Frauen	Thun Berner-Oberland	1–7 (A)	21 September 2024	6	
