= 2022–23 Swiss Women's Super League =

Swiss Women's Super League
- Season: 2022–23
- Dates: 20 August 2022–10 June 2023
- Champions: Zürich
- Matches: 117
- Goals: 450 (3.85 per match)
- All statistics correct as of 5 June 2023.

The 2022–23 Swiss Women's Super League (referred to as the Axa Women's Super League for sponsoring reasons) was the 53nd season of top-tier competitive women's football in Switzerland.

== Format ==
In the regular season, the eight teams of the 2021–22 Playoffs joined by the two winners of relegation/promotion playoff, Yverdon and Rapperswil-Jona. At the end of the first phase, the eight top teams advance to the playoffs. The bottom two teams are joined by the top two teams of the Nationalliga B in the relegation playoff. The regular season starts on 20 August 2022 and ends on 22 April 2023.

Playoff schedule and bracket were drawn following conclusion of the regular season.

The winner of the playoffs is crowned Swiss Champion. The champion qualifies to the UEFA Champions League.

The top two teams of the Relegation Playoff are qualified for the 2023–24 Swiss Women's Super League, the bottom two are relegated to 2023-24 Nationalliga B. FC Yverdon Féminin and FC Rapperswil-Jona are joined by Frauenteam Thun Berner-Oberland and FC Sion from the Nationalliga B. The four teams will play each play home and away games against each other. Top two teams will play the 2023–24 Swiss Women's Super League, bottom two are relegated to the Nationalliga B.

== Teams ==
Location of the 2022–23 Swiss Women's Super League teams

Team	Location	Stadium
Aarau	Aarau	Sportanlage Schachen
FC Basel	Basel	Sportanlagen St. Jakob
Grasshoppers Club Zürich	Niederhasli	GC/Campus
FC Luzern	Lucerne	Sportanlagen Allmend
Rapperswil-Jona	Rapperswil-Jona	Stadion Grünfeld
Servette FC Chênois Féminin	Grand-Lancy	Stade de Marignac
FC St. Gallen Frauen	St. Gallen	Stadion Espenmoos
FC Yverdon	Yverdon	Stade Municipal
BSC YB Frauen	Bern	Wyler
FC Zürich Frauen	Zürich	Heerenschürli

== Regular season ==
Pos	Team	Pld	W	D	L	GF	GA	GD	Pts	Qualification or relegation	SFC	ZUR	GCZ	STG	YBF	BAS	LUZ	AAR	YVE	RAP
1	Servette Chênois	18	16	2	0	56	15	+41	50	Advance to Playoffs		1–1	2–1	2–1	3–0	5–2	3–1	6–1	6–0	4–0
2	Zürich (C, O)	18	14	2	2	68	20	+48	44	Advance to Playoffs	2–4		3–1	6–1	7–2	8–0	4–1	3–0	6–0	7–0
3	Grasshopper	18	12	2	4	60	29	+31	38	Advance to Playoffs	2–2	2–0		3–4	8–2	4–5	3–1	5–1	3–1	5–0
4	St. Gallen	18	9	2	7	37	35	+2	29	Advance to Playoffs	2–3	3–5	2–2		2–0	3–1	1–3	3–2	6–0	3–1
5	YB Frauen	18	8	3	7	40	34	+6	27	Advance to Playoffs	1–2	1–2	2–3	4–0		2–2	1–0	0–0	5–0	3–1
6	Basel	18	5	7	6	31	35	−4	22	Advance to Playoffs	1–2	2–2	3–4	2–0	1–1		1–1	0–0	3–0	3–0
7	Luzern	18	6	1	11	28	33	−5	19	Advance to Playoffs	0–1	0–2	0–5	0–3	2–3	1–0		6–0	5–0	3–0
8	Aarau	18	4	4	10	20	44	−24	16	Advance to Playoffs	0–4	2–5	0–2	0–1	0–5	0–0	3–1		1–1	5–1
9	Yverdon (R)	18	1	3	14	4	59	−55	6	Relegation Playoff	0–2	0–3	0–5	0–1	0–1	1–1	1–0	0–3		0–0
10	Rapperswil-Jona (O)	18	1	2	15	18	58	−40	5	Relegation Playoff	0–4	0–2	1–2	1–1	1–7	1–4	2–3	1–2	8–0	

Source: Meisterschaft
Rules for classification: 1) Points; 2) Goal difference; 3) Goals scored; 4) Head-to-head goal difference; 5) Away goals scored; 6) Draw.
(C) Champions; (O) Play-off winners; (R) Relegated

== Playoffs ==
=== Bracket ===
Quarter-finals
Aarau	0	1	1
Servette	4	8	12
Young Boys	2	0	2
St. Gallen	3	4	7
Basel	0	0	0
Grasshopper	3	1	4
Luzern	0	0	0
Zürich	7	1	8

Semi-finals
Servette	2	2	4
St. Gallen	1	2	3
Grasshopper	2	1	3
Zürich	3	5	8

Final
Servette	0
Zürich	3

=== Results ===
==== Quarter-finals ====
6 May 2023
16:00

FC Aarau	0–4	Servette FC Chênois Féminin
	Report	4', 31' Bourma; 53' Sow; 77' Saoud

Sportanlage Schachen Aarau
Attendance: 135
13 May 2023
20:00

Servette FC Chênois Féminin	8–1	FC Aarau
Padilla 16', 74', 78'; Clémaron 42', 45+1'; Sow 52', 62'; Serrano 82'	Report	36' (o.g.) Hurni

Stade de la Fontenette
Attendance: 183

Servette win 12–1 on aggregate.

6 May 2023
16:00

BSC YB Frauen	2–3	FC St. Gallen Frauen
Beney 12'; Ueltschi 74'	Report	60' Bernet; 75' Iseni; 82' Ess

Kunstrasenfeld Wyler
Attendance: 1,070
13 May 2023
18:00

FC St. Gallen Frauen	4–0	BSC YB Frauen
Aeberhard 1', 15'; Iseni 34' (pen.); Bernet 62'	Report

Stadion Espenmoos
Attendance: 563

St. Gallen win 7–2 on aggregate.

6 May 2023
18:00

FC Basel 1893	0–3	Grasshopper Club Zürich
	Report	13', 29' (pen.) Cazalla; 53' Linyan

Sportanlagen St. Jakob
13 May 2023
19:00

Grasshopper Club Zürich	1–0	FC Basel 1893
Linyan 31'	Report

GC/Campus

Grasshoppers win 4–0 on aggregate.

6 May 2023
16:00

FC Luzern	0–7	FC Zürich Frauen
	Report	50' Pinther; 51' Humm; 65', 84', 85' (pen.) Höbinger; 70' Egli; 88' Schertenleib

Sportanlagen Allmend
Attendance: 200
13 May 2023
14:30

FC Zürich Frauen	1–0	FC Luzern
Humm 34'	Report

Heerenschürli
Attendance: 520

Zürich win 8–0 on aggregate.

==== Semi-finals ====
20 May 2023
18:00

FC St. Gallen Frauen	1–2	Servette FC Chênois Féminin
Glanzmann 45+1'	Report	46' Nakkach; 52' Padilla

Stadion Espenmoos
Attendance: 724
27 May 2023
20:00

Servette FC Chênois Féminin	2–2	FC St. Gallen Frauen
Tufo 13'; Nakkach 24'	Report	37' Bachmann; 55' Batliner

Stade de la Fontenette
Attendance: 1052

Servette win 4–3 on aggregate.

20 May 2023
19:00

Grasshopper Club Zürich	2–3	FC Zürich Frauen
Rinast 31'; Linyan 68'	Report	45+1' Vetterlein; 61', 73' Piubel

GC/Campus
27 May 2023
16:00

FC Zürich Frauen	5–1	Grasshopper Club Zürich
Pinther 28'; Humm 31'; Riesen 64'; Woś 88'; Höbinger 90+1'	Report	86' (pen.) Cazalla

Heerenschürli
Attendance: 1400

Zürich win 8–3 on aggregate.

==== Final ====
2 June 2023
20:00

Servette FC Chênois Féminin	0–3	FC Zürich Frauen
	Report	Höbinger 45'; Humm 75'; Pilgrim 90+2'

Kybunpark
Attendance: 1,937

== Placement Games ==
Eliminated teams of the playoff quarter finals play placement games to determine placement between ranks 5-8.

20 May 2023
16:00

FC Aarau	1–2	BSC YB Frauen
Petkova 29'	Report	45+2' Carp; 78' Sahlmann

Sportanlage Schachen, Aarau
Attendance: 85
27 May 2023
16:30

BSC YB Frauen	3–2 (a.e.t.)	FC Aarau
Frey 72', 94'; Krawczyk 97'	Report	42' Petkova; 82' Enz

Kunstrasenfeld Wyler

Young Boys win 5–3 on aggregate.

21 May 2023
14:00

FC Luzern	0–2	FC Basel 1893
	Report	Strode 59', 63' (pen.)

Sportanlagen Allmend
Attendance: 150
27 May 2023
18:00

FC Basel 1893	0–1	FC Luzern
	Report	20' Klotz

Sportanlagen St. Jakob
Attendance: 300

Basel win 2–1 on aggregate.

== Final standings ==
Pos.	Team	Pld	W	D	L	Pts	GF	GA	GD
1st place, gold medalist(s)	Zürich	23	19	2	2	59	87	23	+64
2nd place, silver medalist(s)	Servette	23	19	3	1	60	72	22	+50
3rd place, bronze medalist(s)	Grasshopper	22	14	2	6	44	67	37	+30
4	St. Gallen	22	11	3	8	36	47	41	+6
5	Young Boys	22	10	3	9	33	47	44	+3
6	Basel	22	6	7	9	25	33	40	−7
7	Luzern	22	7	1	14	22	29	43	−14
8	Aarau	22	4	4	14	16	24	61	−37
9	Yverdon	18	1	3	14	6	4	59	−55
10	Rapperswil-Jona	18	1	2	15	5	18	58	−40

== Relegation Playoff ==
Pos	Team	Pld	W	D	L	GF	GA	GD	Pts		RAP	TBO	YVE	SIO
1	FC Rapperswil-Jona	5	4	1	0	7	1	+6	13	2023–24 Swiss Women's Super League			2–1	3–0
2	Frauenteam Thun Berner-Oberland (P)	5	3	1	1	5	3	+2	10	2023–24 Swiss Women's Super League	0–1		1–1	1–0
3	FC Yverdon Féminin (R)	5	1	2	2	8	7	+1	5	2023–24 Nationalliga B	0–0	1–2		5–2
4	FC Sion	5	0	0	5	2	11	−9	0	2023–24 Nationalliga B	0–1	0–1		

Updated to match(es) played on 3 June 2023. Source: Meisterschaft
Rules for classification: 1) Points; 2) Goal difference; 3) Goals scored; 4) Head-to-head goal difference; 5) Away goals scored; 6) Draw.
(P) Promoted; (R) Relegated
