= 2021–22 Swiss Women's Super League =

Swiss Women's Super League
- Season: 2021–22
- Dates: 12 August 2021–6 June 2022
- Champions: FC Zürich Frauen; 23rd title
- UEFA Women's Champions League: Servette FC Chênois Féminin; FC Zürich Frauen
- Matches played: 105
- All statistics correct as of 28 April 2022.

The 2021–22 Swiss Women's Super League (referred to as the Axa Women's Super League for sponsoring reasons) is the 52nd season of top-tier competitive women's football in Switzerland.

== Format ==
In the regular season, ten teams (eight teams from the previous season and two teams from the 2020-21 Nationalliga B) play a round-robin league, with home and away games, for a total of 18 games each. At the end of the first phase, the eight top teams advance to the playoffs. The bottom two teams are joined by the top two teams of the Nationalliga B in the relegation playoff.

The winner of the playoffs is crowned Swiss Champion. The champion and the winner of the regular season qualify to the UEFA Champions League.

The top two teams of the Relegation Playoff are qualified for the 2022–23 Swiss Women's Super League, the bottom two are relegated to 2022-23 Nationalliga B.

== Teams ==
Team	Location	Stadium
FC Aarau Frauen	Aarau	Sportanlage Schachen
FC Basel 1893	Basel	Sportanlagen St. Jakob
Grasshopper Club Zürich	Niederhasli	GC/Campus
FC Lugano Femminile	Lugano	Stadio Comunale Cornaredo
FC Luzern	Lucerne	Sportanlagen Allmend
Servette FC Chênois Féminin	Grand-Lancy	Stade de Marignac
FC St. Gallen-Staad	St. Gallen	Stadion Espenmoos
FC Yverdon Féminin	Yverdon	Stade Municipal
BSC YB Frauen	Bern	Wyler
FC Zürich Frauen	Zürich	Heerenschürli

== Regular season ==
=== League table ===
Pos	Team	Pld	W	D	L	GF	GA	GD	Pts	Qualification or relegation	SFC	ZUR	GCZ	BAS	STG	LUZ	YBF	AAR	YVE	LUG
1	Servette FC Chênois Féminin (Q)	18	15	1	2	44	9	+35	46	UWCL Round 1 and Playoffs		1–1	0–2	3–0	5–0	1–0	2–1	2–0	6–0	3–1
2	FC Zürich Frauen	18	14	2	2	65	13	+52	44	Advance to Playoffs	2–1		2–0	2–0	1–0	4–0	7–0	4–1	6–0	7–0
3	Grasshopper Club Zürich	18	12	1	5	49	22	+27	37	Advance to Playoffs	0–2	1–0		2–4	0–0	4–2	8–0	3–0	5–0	2–0
4	FC Basel 1893	18	11	2	5	40	20	+20	35	Advance to Playoffs	0–2	3–3	7–0		1–2	1–0	3–1	1–0	0–0	2–0
5	FC St. Gallen-Staad	18	11	2	5	37	19	+18	35	Advance to Playoffs	0–3	1–3	2–0	2–2		4–0	1–0	5–0	3–1	3–0
6	FC Luzern	18	7	2	9	32	32	0	23	Advance to Playoffs	0–1	2–3	2–4	1–3	2–1		3–0	3–1	2–1	5–1
7	BSC YB Frauen	18	6	1	11	21	51	−30	19	Advance to Playoffs	0–3	0–5	1–8	1–0	0–2	2–2		2–3	2–1	3–0
8	FC Aarau Frauen	18	4	3	11	18	36	−18	15	Advance to Playoffs	1–2	2–1	0–2	0–3	1–3	1–1	2–3		3–0	1–1
9	FC Yverdon Féminin	18	2	0	16	10	63	−53	6	Relegation Playoff	1–4	1–8	0–5	0–4	0–4	0–3	1–3	0–2		2–0
10	FC Lugano Femminile (R)	18	0	2	16	3	54	−51	2	Relegation to 2022-23 Nationalliga B (Note: FC Lugano Femminile withdrew from the Axa Women's Super League and are relegated directly, without going through the relegation playoff.)	0–3	0–6	0–3	0–3	0–4	0–4	0–2	0–0	0–1	

Source: Meisterschaft
Rules for classification: 1) Points; 2) Goal difference; 3) Goals scored; 4) Head-to-head goal difference; 5) Away goals scored; 6) Draw.
(Q) Qualified for the phase indicated; (R) Relegated

== Playoffs ==
=== Bracket ===
Quarter-finals
Servette	1	4	5
FC Aarau	0	0	0
Basel	3	4	7
St. Gallen-Staad	0	1	1
Grasshopper	5	3	8
Luzern	2	3	5
Zürich	2	7	9
Young Boys	1	0	1

Semi-finals
Servette (a.e.t.) (p)	0	2	2 (4)
Basel	2	0	2 (3)
Grasshopper	0	0	0
Zürich	1	3	4

Final
Servette	2	(4)
Zürich (a.e.t.) (p)	2	(5)

=== Results ===
==== Quarter-finals ====
7 May 2022
16:00

FC Aarau	0–1	Servette FC Chênois Féminin
	Report

Sportanlage Schachen Aarau
14 May 2022
18:00

Servette FC Chênois Féminin	4–0	FC Aarau
	Report

Stade de la Fontenette

Servette FC Chênois Féminin won 5–0 on aggregate.

8 May 2022
16:00

FC St. Gallen-Staad	0–3	FC Basel 1893
	Report

Stadion Espenmoos
14 May 2022
18:00

FC Basel 1893	4–1	FC St. Gallen-Staad
	Report

Sportanlage "Nachwuchs-Campus" Basel

FC Basel 1893 won 7–1 on aggregate.

7 May 2022
18:00

FC Luzern	2–5	Grasshopper Club Zürich
	Report

Sportanlagen Allmend
14 May 2022
19:00

Grasshopper Club Zürich	3–3	FC Luzern
	Report

GC/Campus

Grasshopper Club Zürich won 8–5 on aggregate.

7 May 2022
15:30

BSC YB Frauen	1–2	FC Zürich Frauen
	Report

Stadion Wankdorf
14 May 2022
14:30

FC Zürich Frauen	7–0	BSC YB Frauen
	Report

Heerenschürli

FC Zürich Frauen won 9–1 on aggregate.

==== Semi-finals ====
21 May 2022
20:15

FC Basel 1893	2–0	Servette FC Chênois Féminin
	Report

Sportanlagen St. Jakob
28 May 2022
20:00

Servette FC Chênois Féminin	2–0 (a.e.t.)	FC Basel 1893
	Report
Penalties
	4–3

Stade de la Fontenette

2–2 on aggregate. Servette FC Chênois Féminin won 4–3 on penalties.

21 May 2022
17:00

Grasshopper Club Zürich	0–1	FC Zürich Frauen
	Report

GC/Campus
28 May 2022
20:15

FC Zürich Frauen	3–0	Grasshopper Club Zürich
	Report

Heerenschürli

FC Zürich Frauen won 4–0 on aggregate.

==== Final ====
6 June 2022
15:00 CEST

Servette FC Chênois Féminin	2–2 (a.e.t.)	FC Zürich Frauen
Schnider 18'; Lagonia 99'	Report	82' (pen.) Moser; 105+6' Humm
Penalties
Lagonia (penalty scored); Jade (penalty missed); Mendes (penalty scored); Padilla (penalty scored); Pereira (penalty scored); Felber (penalty missed)	4–5	(penalty scored) Vetterlein; (penalty scored) Stierli; (penalty scored) Humm; (penalty scored) Dubs; (penalty missed) Moser; (penalty scored) Höbinger

Stade de la Tuilière, Lausanne
Attendance: 2,642

== Placement Games ==
Eliminated teams of the playoff quarter finals play placement games to determine placement between ranks 5–8.

21 May 2022
16:00

BSC YB Frauen	1-5	FC Luzern
	Report

Kunstrasenfeld Wyler
28 May 2022
16:00

FC Luzern	3-1	BSC YB Frauen
	Report

Sportanlagen Allmend

FC Luzern won 8–2 on aggregate.

21 May 2022
16:00

FC Aarau Frauen	0–3	FC St. Gallen-Staad
	Report

Sportanlage Schachen Aarau
28 May 2022
17:00

FC St. Gallen-Staad	2–1	FC Aarau Frauen
	Report

Stadion Espenmoos

FC St. Gallen-Staad won 5–1 on aggregate.

== Relegation playoff ==
As FC Lugano Femminile withdrew from the Axa Women's Super League and are relegated directly, only the 9th place team of the Women's Super League will play against the top two teams of the Nationalliga B. The three teams will play a round-robin playoff with home and away games. The first and second ranked teams will be promoted or remain in the AWSL, while the last placed will be relegated.

=== Table ===
Pos	Team	Pld	W	D	L	GF	GA	GD	Pts		YVE	RAP	TBO
1	FC Yverdon Féminin (P)	4	3	0	1	6	5	+1	9	2022–23 Swiss Women's Super League		2–1	2–1
2	FC Rapperswil-Jona (P)	4	2	0	2	9	7	+2	6	2022–23 Swiss Women's Super League	2–0		1–4
3	Frauenteam Thun Berner-Oberland (R)	4	1	0	3	7	10	−3	3	2022-23 Nationalliga B	1–2	1–5	

Source: Meisterschaft
Rules for classification: 1) Points; 2) Goal difference; 3) Goals scored; 4) Head-to-head goal difference; 5) Away goals scored; 6) Draw.
(P) Promoted; (R) Relegated
