= Mickaëla Bottega =

Senegalese footballer (born 1993)

Personal information
- Full name: Mickaëla Victoria Maeva Bottega
- Date of birth: 29 December 1993 (age 32)
- Place of birth: Marseille, France
- Height: 1.76 m (5 ft 9 in)
- Position: Goalkeeper

Team information
- Current team: Servette
- Number: 32

Senior career*
Years	Team	Apps	(Gls)
2015–2017	Toulon	12	(0)
2017–2018	Nîmes	3	(0)
2018–2021	Soyaux	0	(0)
2021–2022	Nice	6	(0)
2022–2023	Sion	6	(0)
2023–	Servette	14	(0)

International career^{‡}
2026–	Senegal	1	(0)
- * Club domestic league appearances and goals as of 31 May 2026 ‡ National team caps and goals as of 31 May 2026

Mickaëla Victoria Maeva Bottega (born 29 December 1993) is a professional footballer who plays as a goalkeeper for Swiss Women's Super League club Servette. Born in France, she plays for the Senegal national team.

== Club career ==
Bottega began her senior career in France with Toulon, making 12 appearances in the 2016–17 Division 2 Féminine season.

In 2017, Bottega moved to Nîmes, where she made three league appearances.

In 2018, she signed for Soyaux, where she was registered as a backup goalkeeper for three seasons.

In 2021, Bottega signed with Nice, making six league appearances. The following season, she moved to Swiss club Sion.

In 2023, she joined Swiss Women's Super League club Servette.

== International career ==
Bottega made her debut for the Senegal national team in 2026, having joined in February of that year.

== Personal life ==
Bottega is of Italian, German and Senegalese descents, the latter coming from her maternal grandmother, with whom she was raised.

== Career statistics ==
=== Club ===
Appearances and goals by club, season and competition
Club	Season	League			Cup		Continental		Total	
Club	Season	Division	Apps	Goals	Apps	Goals	Apps	Goals	Apps	Goals
Toulon	2016–17	Division 2 Féminine	12	0	0	0	0	0	12	0
Nîmes	2017–18	Division 2 Féminine	3	0	0	0	0	0	3	0
Soyaux	2018–19	Division 1 Féminine	0	0	0	0	0	0	0	0
Soyaux	2019–20	Division 1 Féminine	0	0	0	0	0	0	0	0
Soyaux	2020–21	Division 1 Féminine	0	0	0	0	0	0	0	0
Nice	2021–22	Division 2 Féminine	6	0	1	0	0	0	7	0
Sion	2022–23	Nationalliga B	6	0	0	0	0	0	6	0
Servette	2023–24	Swiss Women's Super League	3	0	1	0	0	0	4	0
Servette	2024–25	Swiss Women's Super League	7	0	3	0	3	0	13	0
Servette	2025–26	Swiss Women's Super League	4	0	4	0	0	0	8	0
Total			41	0	9	0	3	0	53	0

=== International ===
Team	Year	Apps	Goals
Senegal	2026	1	0
Total		1	0
