= 2025–26 Nationalliga B (women's football) =

Nationalliga B
- Season: 2025–26

The 2025–26 Nationalliga B was the 2025–26 season of the Nationalliga B, the second-tier women's association football competition in Switzerland.

== Team changes ==
Despite two teams finishing in relegation positions at the end of the previous season, no third-tier team met the requirements to be promoted, and either were not granted a license or did not apply for one to play in the second division. Wil and Solothurn were the two teams who finished in the relegation positions.

Two teams had a chance to be promoted, Yverdon Féminin and FC Schlieren, but neither were successful following the 2024–25 Women's Super League qualifying round.

== League table ==
Pos	Team	Pld	W	D	L	GF	GA	GD	Pts	Status
1	Yverdon	22	19	3	0	85	14	+71	60	Qualification to promotion play-offs
2	Sion	22	15	3	4	64	30	+34	48	Qualification to promotion play-offs
3	Winterthur	22	15	1	6	77	34	+43	46	Qualification to placement 3rd-7th round
4	Schlieren	22	12	4	6	47	36	+11	40	Qualification to placement 3rd-7th round
5	Küssnacht	22	12	2	8	46	37	+9	38	Qualification to placement 3rd-7th round
6	Wil	22	10	6	6	58	36	+22	36	Qualification to placement 3rd-7th round
7	Ostermundigen	22	9	2	11	44	54	−10	29	Qualification to placement 3rd-7th round
8	Lugano	22	8	4	10	39	43	−4	28	Qualification to placement 8th-12th round
9	Étoile Carouge	22	6	2	14	22	65	−43	20	Qualification to placement 8th-12th round
10	Oerlikon/Polizei	22	3	7	12	30	49	−19	16	Qualification to placement 8th-12th round
11	Wädenswil	22	4	3	15	33	63	−30	15	Qualification to placement 8th-12th round
12	Solothurn	22	0	1	21	8	92	−84	1	Qualification to placement 8th-12th round

Source: SFA

== Placement round ==
=== Places 3–7 ===
Pos	Team	Pld	W	D	L	GF	GA	GD	Pts
1	Winterthur	26	18	2	6	86	38	+48	56
2	Schlieren	26	13	4	9	59	50	+9	43
3	Wil	26	12	6	8	66	45	+21	42
4	Küssnacht	26	12	4	10	51	45	+6	40
5	Ostermundigen	26	11	3	12	56	65	−9	36

Source: SFA

=== Places 8–12 ===
Pos	Team	Pld	W	D	L	GF	GA	GD	Pts	
1	Lugano	26	11	5	10	55	46	+9	38	
2	Étoile Carouge	26	9	2	15	31	71	−40	29	
3	Oerlikon/Polizei	26	5	7	14	42	56	−14	22	
4	Wädenswil	26	5	4	17	39	68	−29	19	Relegated to the 1. Liga
5	Solothurn	26	0	1	25	9	115	−106	1	Relegated to the 1. Liga

Source: SFA
