= Nadine Riesen =

Swiss footballer (born 2000)

Personal information
- Full name: Nadine Andrina Riesen
- Date of birth: 11 April 2000 (age 26)
- Place of birth: St. Gallen, Switzerland
- Height: 1.68 m (5 ft 6 in)
- Position: Defender

Team information
- Current team: West Ham United
- Number: 22

Youth career
- 2009–2015: FC Buehler

Senior career*
Years	Team	Apps	(Gls)
2015–2019	FC St. Gallen/FC St. Gallen-Staad	43	(7)
2019–2021	BSC Young Boys	39	(8)
2021–2023	FC Zürich	46	(8)
2023–2026	Eintracht Frankfurt	49	(1)
2026-	West Ham United	10	(0)

International career^{‡}
2016	Switzerland U16	3	(0)
2016–2017	Switzerland U17	10	(0)
2017–2019	Switzerland U19	17	(0)
2019–	Switzerland	46	(2)
- * Club domestic league appearances and goals as of 17:10, 21 November 2026 (UTC) ‡ National team caps and goals as of 08:20, 14 October 2026 (UTC)

Nadine Andrina Riesen (born 11 April 2000) is a Swiss footballer who plays as a defender for Women's Super League club West Ham United and the Switzerland national team.

== Early life ==
Riesen grew up in Niederteufen, Appenzell. She has an older sister named Selina. Sje began playing football at the age of 9 at FC Bühler, winning two junior cups with the team.

== Club career ==
In 2015, Riesen moved to FC St. Gallen's first team. She made her debut in the Swiss Women's Super League aged 15. St. Gallen was relegated to Nationalliga B ahead of the 2016–17 season. In 2017, FC St. Gallen merged with FC Staad to form FC St. Gallen-Staad.

In 2019, Riesen joined BSC Young Boys, returning to the Super League. In May 2021, she was voted into the Swiss Association of Football Players' team of the season (the Golden 11).

In June 2021, Riesen moved to FC Zürich. In her first season with the club, she earned the domestic double as FCZ won both the league title and the Swiss Cup. Riesen signed a two year contract extension with the club in May 2022. The team would again win the league in the 2022–23 season.

In August 2023, Riesen joined Frauen Bundesliga club Eintracht Frankfurt. She played alongside Swiss teammate Géraldine Reuteler; they would both go on to leave Frankfurt in the summer of 2026.

On 22 June 2026, it was announced that Riesen would join West Ham United in the English Women's Super League on a 3 year deal following her departure from Eintracht Frankfurt.

== International career ==
In 2018, Riesen was called up to the home under-19 European Championship. The Swiss team was eliminated following the conclusion of the group stage.

On 14 June 2019, at age 19, Riesen made her senior debut against Serbia. In June 2022, due to an injury to Ella Touon, she was called up to the Swiss squad during final preparations for Euro 2022.

Riesen scored her first senior international goal in April 2024, during a 4–0 victory over Azerbaijan in a Euro 2025 qualifying match.

On 23 June 2025, Riesen was called up to the squad for the Euro 2025, a home tournament for Switzerland. She scored in Switzerland's opening match, the only goal for the Swiss during a 1–2 defeat to Norway. In the quarter-finals, Switzerland were defeated 2–0 by Spain and exited the competition.

== International goals ==
No.	Date	Venue	Opponent	Score	Result	Competition
1.	9 April 2024	Dalga Arena, Baku, Azerbaijan	Azerbaijan	4–0	4–0	UEFA Women's Euro 2025 qualifying
2.	2 July 2025	St. Jakob-Park, Basel, Switzerland	Norway	1–0	1–2	UEFA Women's Euro 2025

== Honours ==
FC Zürich

- Swiss Super League: 2021–22, 2022–23
- Swiss Cup: 2022
