= Laura Felber =

Swiss footballer (born 2001)

Personal information
- Full name: Laura Felber
- Date of birth: 17 August 2001 (age 25)
- Place of birth: Geneva, Switzerland
- Position: Defender

Team information
- Current team: Pogoń Szczecin
- Number: 4

Youth career
- –2017: Compesières FC

Senior career*
| Years | Team | Apps | (Gls) |
| 2017–2026 | Servette | | |
| 2026– | Pogoń Szczecin | 0 | (0) |

International career^{‡}
| 2022– | Switzerland | | |
- * Club domestic league appearances and goals as of 20:14, 7 August 2026 (UTC) ‡ National team caps and goals as of 20:14, 7 August 2026 (UTC)

Laura Felber (born 17 August 2001) is a Swiss professional footballer who plays as a defender for Ekstraliga club Pogoń Szczecin and the Switzerland national team.

== Club career ==
Laura Felber made her debut for Servette on 2 September 2017 against Thun Berner-Oberland. She started featuring for the club's senior team in Switzerland's top division in the 2018–19 season, and qualified for the UEFA Women's Champions League in the 2019–20 season. In 2021, she won her first Swiss league title with Servette.

On 5 August 2026, Felber moved to Polish Ekstraliga club Pogoń Szczecin on a one-year contract, with an option for another year.

== International career ==
Felber was called up for the first time to the Switzerland national team for the 2023 World Cup qualification games. In 2022, she made her senior debut for Switzerland.

== Honours ==
Servette

- Swiss Super League: 2020–21, 2023–24, 2025–26
- Nationalliga B: 2017–18
- Swiss Cup: 2022–23, 2023–24, 2025–26
