= Stenia Michel =

Swiss footballer (born 1987)

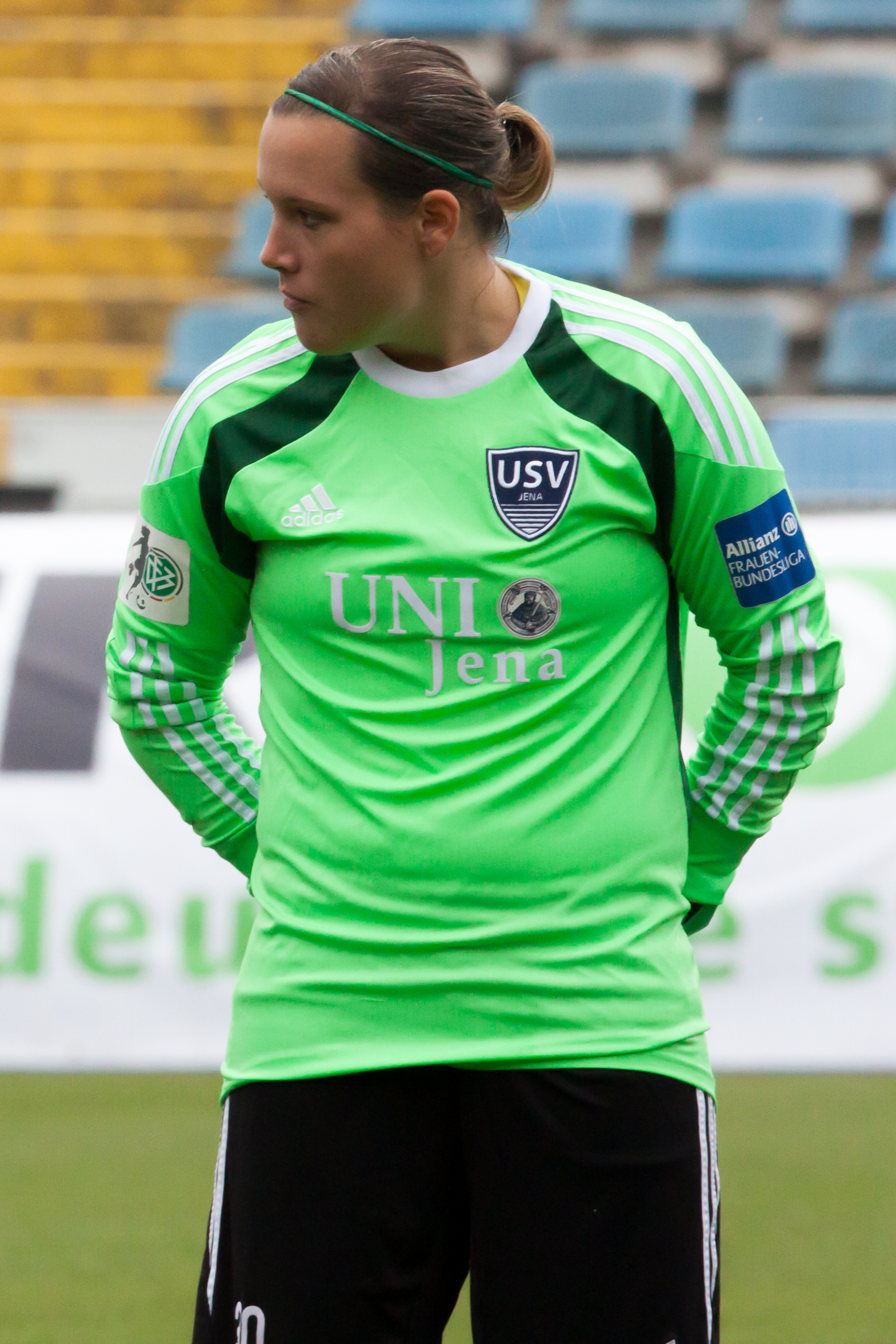
- Michel in 2014

Personal information
- Full name: Stenia Liliane Michel
- Date of birth: 23 October 1987 (age 39)
- Place of birth: Uster, Switzerland
- Height: 1.61 m (5 ft 3 in)
- Position: Goalkeeper

Youth career
- 1996–2000: FC Uster
- 2000–2002: FC Wetzikon

Senior career*
Years	Team	Apps	(Gls)
2001–2013	Zürich		
2013–2016	USV Jena	72	(0)
2016–2018	Basel	46	(0)

International career^{‡}
2004–2006	Switzerland U19	9	(0)
2006	Switzerland U20	1	(0)
2014–2017	Switzerland	14	(0)

Managerial career
- 2018–2020: Grasshopper Club Zürich (goalkeeping coach)
- 2021–: Basel (goalkeeping coach)
- * Club domestic league appearances and goals as of 30 July 2023 ‡ National team caps and goals as of 29 July 2023

Stenia Liliane Michel (born 23 October 1987) is a retired Swiss footballer who last played as a goalkeeper for FC Basel of the Swiss Nationalliga A. She previously played for FF USV Jena of the German Bundesliga, and FC Zürich of Switzerland's Nationalliga A, who were known as SV Seebach until 2008. Michel has been a member of the Switzerland national team since 2005, but did not make her debut until March 2014, a 1–1 draw with South Korea at the 2014 Cyprus Cup.

Michel became Switzerland's first-choice goalkeeper in the run up to the 2015 FIFA Women's World Cup, because rival Gaëlle Thalmann had suffered an anterior cruciate ligament injury.

== Honours ==
=== Zürich ===
Swiss Super League

- Champion (5): 2007/08, 2008/09, 2009/10, 2011/12, 2012/13
- Runner-up (1): 2006/07

Swiss Cup

- Champion (3): 2006/07, 2011/12, 2012/13
- Runner-up (2): 2004/05, 2005/06,

=== Basel ===
Swiss Super League

- Runner-up: 2017/18
