= Betschart =

Betschart is a surname. Notable people with the surname include:

- Hermann Betschart (1910–1950), Swiss rower
- Kurt Betschart (born 1968), Swiss professional cyclist
- Nina Betschart (born 1995), Swiss professional beach volleyball player
- Sandra Betschart (born 1989), Swiss footballer
- Herbert Betschart (born 1953), Entrepreneur
