= Jehona Mehmeti =

Swiss footballer (born 1990)

Personal information
- Full name: Jehona Mehmeti
- Date of birth: 25 September 1990 (age 36)
- Place of birth: Switzerland
- Position: Midfielder

Senior career*
Years	Team	Apps	(Gls)
2005–2007	YB Frauen		
2007–2008	Rot-Schwarz		
2008–2009	Zuchwil 05		
2009–2011	YB Frauen	11	(3)
2011–2012	Basel	11	(12)
2012	Yverdon	5	(2)
2013	Basel		
2015–2016	YB Frauen	10	(1)
2017–2018	Aarau	3	(0)
2018–	Ostermundigen		

International career
2010–	Switzerland	31	(3)
- * Club domestic league appearances and goals

Jehona Mehmeti is a Swiss football midfielder currently playing for FC Ostermundigen in the Swiss third division. She is a member of the Swiss national team since debuting at 19 in 2010, and played the 2010 U-20 World Cup as a junior international.
