= Alayah Pilgrim =

Swiss footballer (born 2003)

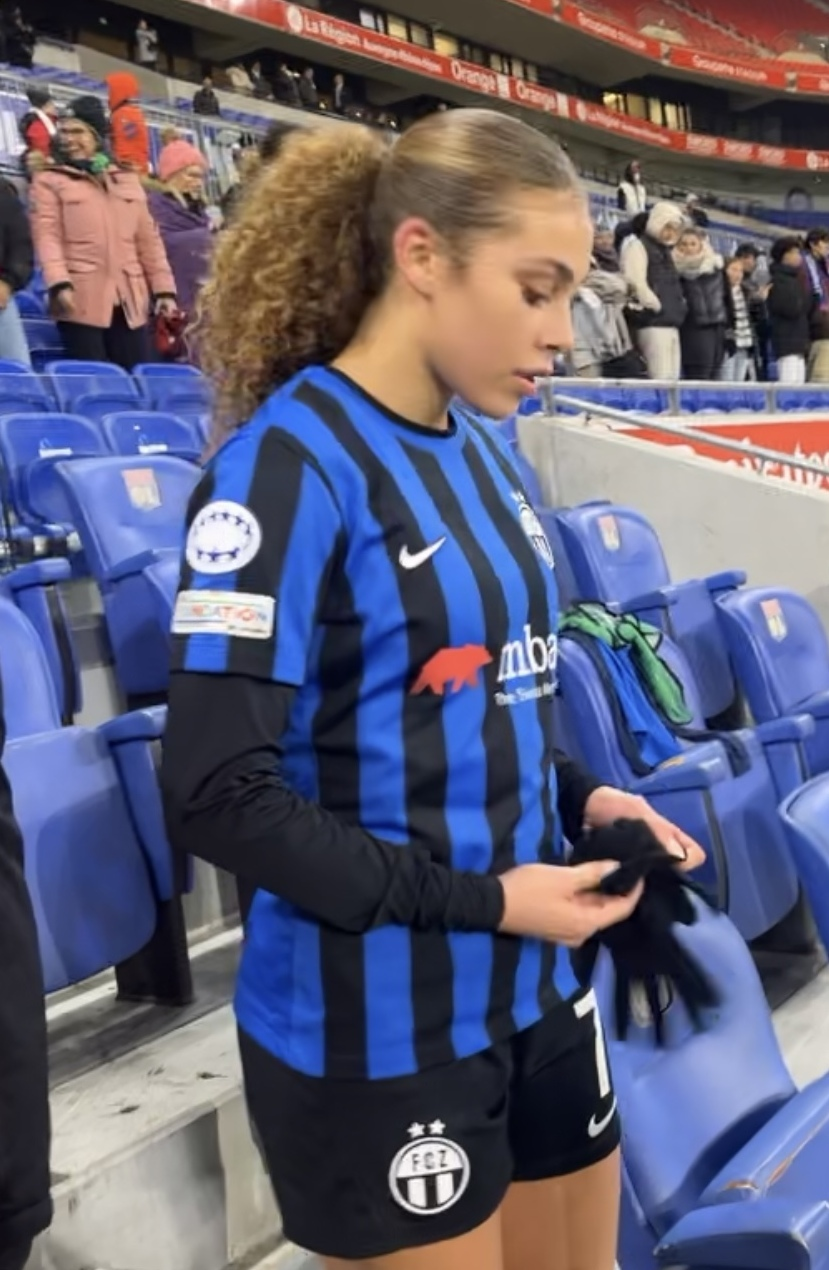

Personal information
- Date of birth: 29 April 2003 (age 23)
- Place of birth: Muri, Switzerland
- Height: 1.71 m (5 ft 7 in)
- Position: Forward

Team information
- Current team: Roma
- Number: 17

Youth career
- 2012–2017: Muri

Senior career*
Years	Team	Apps	(Gls)
2017–2020	Aarau	27	(18)
2020–2022	Basel	34	(13)
2022–2024	Zürich	37	(11)
2024–	Roma	29	(2)

International career^{‡}
2018–2019	Switzerland U16	5	(1)
2019–2020	Switzerland U17	6	(7)
2021	Switzerland U19	3	(2)
2023–	Switzerland	13	(5)
- * Club domestic league appearances and goals as of 05:29, 4 December 2025 (UTC) ‡ National team caps and goals as of 23:00, 28 October 2025 (UTC)

Alayah Pilgrim (Arabic: عالية بيلكريم, pronounced [ʕaːliya bilkriːm]; born 29 April 2003) is a Swiss professional footballer who plays as a forward for Roma and the Switzerland women's national team.

== Club career ==
Pilgrim is a youth product of her local club FC Muri. She was not allowed to play football as a youngster, and so secretly started playing with Muri until a coach intervened and convinced her family. She played with the boys until the maximum allowable age, as the club did not have a women's section. In 2017, she began her senior career with Aarau in the Ligue Nationale B at the age of 15. In 2020 at the age of 17, she moved to Basel on a 2-year contract.

On 10 October 2022, Pilgrim moved to Zürich, where she played in the UEFA Women's Champions League for the first time. She helped Zürich win the 2022–23 Swiss Women's Super League, scoring in the final - a 3–0 win over Servette FC Chênois Féminin on 2 June 2023.

On 26 January 2024, AS Roma announced the signing of Pilgrim.

== International career ==
Pilgrim was a youth international for Switzerland, having played up to the Switzerland U19s. In August 2022, she was called up to the Morocco women's national team for the first time. She declined the invitation, as she received it last minute and didn't have time to decide. A couple of months later in October 2022, she was called up to the Switzerland women's national team for the first time, but did not make an appearance.

Just before the 2023 FIFA Women's World Cup, she opted to formally represent Switzerland internationally. She debuted with them as a substitute in a UEFA Women's Nations League loss to Italy in September 2023.

On 23 June 2025, Pilgrim was called up to the Switzerland squad for the UEFA Women's Euro 2025.

== Honours ==
Zürich

- Swiss Women's Super League: 2022–23

Roma

- Serie A: 2023–24
- Coppa Italia: 2023–24

== Personal life ==
Pilgrim was born in Switzerland to a Moroccan father and Swiss mother. She studied as a health professional and had an internship at the Muri Hospital in the summer of 2021. Outside of football, she also works as an influencer.

== International goals ==
No.	Date	Venue	Opponent	Score	Result	Competition
1.	31 October 2023	Letzigrund, Zürich, Switzerland	Spain	1–4	1–7	2023–24 UEFA Women's Nations
2.	23 February 2024	Marbella Football Center, Marbella, Spain	Poland	2–0	4–1	Friendly
3.	9 April 2024	Dalga Arena, Baku, Azerbaijan	Azerbaijan	3–0	4–0	UEFA Women's Euro 2025 qualifying
4.	6 July 2025	Stade de Tourbillon, Sion, Switzerland	Iceland	2–0	2–0	UEFA Women's Euro 2025
5.	24 October 2025	Swissporarena, Lucerne, Switzerland	Canada	1–0	1–0	Friendly
