= Katja Orschmann =

German footballer

Personal information
- Full name: Katja Nicola Orschmann
- Date of birth: 1 January 1998 (age 28)
- Place of birth: Berlin, Germany
- Height: 1.65 m (5 ft 5 in)
- Position: Centre-back

Team information
- Current team: FC Luzern
- Number: 2

Youth career
- 2003–2013: SFC Stern 1900
- 2013–2016: 1.FC Union Berlin

Senior career*
Years	Team	Apps	(Gls)
2014–2017	1. FC Union Berlin	42	(11)
2017-2020	1. FFC Turbine Potsdam II	41	(7)
2020–2026	1. FC Union Berlin	67	(8)
2026–	FC Luzern	8	(0)

International career^{‡}
2016-2017	Germany U19	2	(0)
2016–2018	Germany U20	2	(0)
- * Club domestic league appearances and goals as of 21 November 2026 ‡ National team caps and goals as of 9 June 2019

Katja Nicola Orschmann (born 8 January 1998) is a German footballer who plays as a Centre-back for FC Luzern in the Swiss Super League.

== Club career ==
Orschmann started her career with her twin sister Dina, in the youth team of SFC Stern 1900, before moving to 1. FC Union Berlin in 2013 and went through several Berlin selection teams up to U-18. At Union, she moved up to the senior team in October 2014. After being relegated to the Regional North League, she decided to transfer to Turbine Potsdam to continue playing in the 2. Bundesliga with their reserve team and to try and earn a place on the first team. In Potsdam, she made 41 appearances and scored seven goals over three seasons, but was unable to qualify for the first team. She returned to Union Berlin for the 2020/21 season and has played there alongside her twin sister since their return in January 2023. After nine and a half years, Katja Orschmann left Union Berlin and joined the Swiss top-flight club FC Luzern on 1 September 2026.

== International career ==
Orschmann made her international debut on July 25, 2016, for the U-19 national team in a 3–1 victory over Austria in Senica, Slovakia, during the 2016 UEFA Women's Under-19 Championship. She and her twin sister Dina were selected for the 2016 FIFA U-20 Women's World Cup World Cup in Papua New Guinea later that year, but she only made a brief appearance on November 21, coming on in the 80th minute of a 2-0 group stage win against South Korea in Port Moresby. In total, she has played two matches each for the U-19 and U-20 national teams.
