= Marie Höbinger =

Austrian footballer

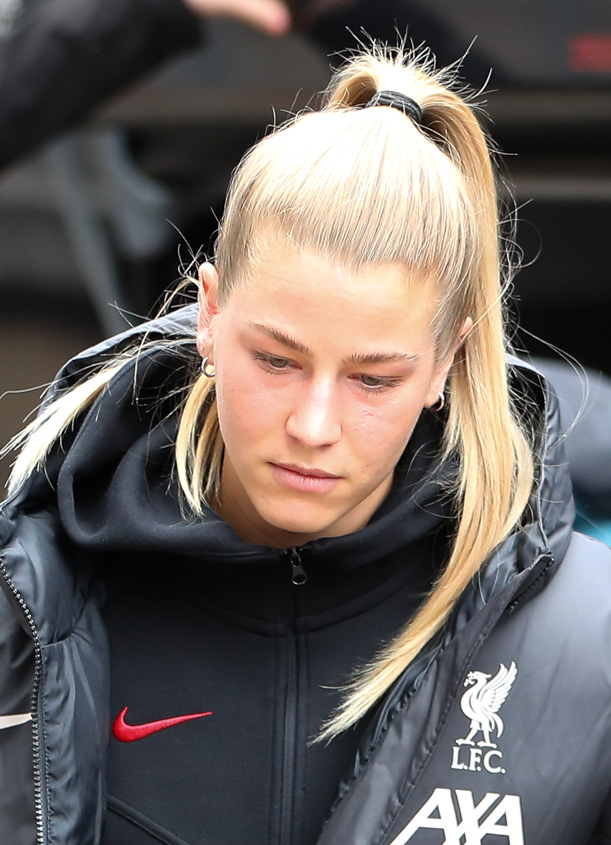
- Marie Höbinger in 2024.

Personal information
- Full name: Marie Therese Höbinger
- Date of birth: 1 July 2001 (age 25)
- Place of birth: Vienna, Austria
- Height: 1.62 m (5 ft 4 in)
- Positions: Midfielder; forward

Team information
- Current team: Liverpool
- Number: 14

Youth career
- 200?–2008: ASV Hinterbrühl
- 2008–2010: 1. SV Wiener Neudorf
- 2010–2015: FC Stadlau
- 2015–2017: Turbine Potsdam

Senior career*
Years	Team	Apps	(Gls)
2017–2019	Turbine Potsdam II	29	(2)
2019–2022	Turbine Potsdam	45	(4)
2022	→ FC Zürich (loan)	8	(1)
2022–2023	FC Zürich	11	(3)
2023–	Liverpool	53	(8)

International career^{‡}
2016–2017	Austria U16	5	(1)
2016–2018	Austria U17	20	(10)
2018–2019	Austria U19	7	(6)
2020–	Austria	53	(8)
- * Club domestic league appearances and goals as of 20:45, 8 November 2026 (UTC) ‡ National team caps and goals as of 14 October 2026

Marie Therese Höbinger (German: [maˈʁiː teˈʁeːzə ˈhøːbɪŋɐ]; born 1 July 2001) is an Austrian footballer who plays as a midfielder or forward for Women's Super League club Liverpool and the Austria national team. Höbinger previously played for FC Zürich where she won two Swiss Women's Super League titles and the Swiss Women's Cup.

== Career ==
=== Youth career ===
Höbinger started her youth football career at ASV Hinterbrühl in Mödling, Austria. At the age of 13, Höbinger moved to Germany.

=== Turbine Potsdam ===
She lived in a boarding house and went to school at German women's club Turbine Potsdam, where she progressed her way from their academy teams up to the first team.

=== FC Zürich ===
After two and a half seasons with Potsdam, Höbinger signed on loan for FC Zürich in 2022, helping the club to win the Swiss Super League and Swiss Cup double and receiving a nomination for AXA Women's Super League Player of the Year. After making the transfer permanent that summer, the club retained the league title in 2022-23.

=== Liverpool FC ===
In July 2023, Höbinger signed for Women's Super League club Liverpool F.C. She made her Reds debut on 1 October 2023 in a 1-0 league win over Arsenal F.C. at the Emirates Stadium. A week later, she marked her home debut with her first goal in a 2–0 win against Aston Villa. In the 2023–24 home game against Tottenham Hotspur, she scored the equaliser making it 1–1 in the 91st minute. On 1 May 2024, Höbinger became the first player in Women's Super League history to assist three goals from corner kicks in a single match during a 4–3 win against eventual champions Chelsea.

Höbinger played in every league game during her first season with Liverpool and made the joint-most appearances for the team in all competitions, featuring 29 times and scoring five goals. Marie's impressive year saw her win the club's Young Player of the Season and Fans' Player of the Season awards.

In January 2025, having established herself as a key player for the team over her first 18 months, Höbinger signed a contract extension with Liverpool.

On 14 October 2025, Liverpool announced that Höbinger had suffered an injury to her anterior cruciate ligament (ACL).

== International career ==
Höbinger made her debut for the Austria women's national team on 8 November 2019 during a 3–0 UEFA Women's Euro 2022 qualifying match victory away to North Macedonia, replacing Lisa Makas in the 82nd minute.

On 23 February 2021, she scored her first goal for Austria; the winner in a 1–0 home win against Slovakia. The midfielder has since established herself as a regular in the side.

Höbinger was part of the Austrian squad that competed at the 2022 UEFA Women's Euros.

== Personal life ==
Höbinger is also a German citizen.

== Career statistics ==
=== Club ===
As of match played 8 November 2026

Appearances and goals by club, season and competition
Club	Season	League			National cup (Note: Includes DFB-Pokal, Swiss Women's Cup, FA Cup,)		League cup (Note: Includes FA Women's League Cup)		Continental (Note: Includes UEFA Women's Champions League)		Total	
Club	Season	Division	Apps	Goals	Apps	Goals	Apps	Goals	Apps	Goals	Apps	Goals
Turbine Potsdam II	2017–18	2. Frauen-Bundesliga	13	2	—		—		—		13	2
Turbine Potsdam II	2018–19	2. Frauen-Bundesliga	16	0	—		—		—		16	0
Turbine Potsdam II	Total		29	2	0	0	0	0	0	0	29	2
Turbine Potsdam	2019–20	Frauen-Bundesliga	20	2	3	1	—		—		23	3
Turbine Potsdam	2020–21	Frauen-Bundesliga	15	0	2	0	—		—		17	0
Turbine Potsdam	2021–22	Frauen-Bundesliga	11	2	2	1	—		—		13	3
Turbine Potsdam	Total		46	4	7	2	0	0	0	0	53	6
FC Zürich (loan)	2021–22	Swiss Women's Super League	8	1	2	0	—		0	0	10	1
FC Zürich	2022–23	Swiss Women's Super League	15	9	0	0	—		4	0	19	9
FC Zürich	Total		23	10	2	0	0	0	4	0	29	10
Liverpool	2023–24	Women's Super League	22	5	3	0	4	0	—		29	5
Liverpool	2024–25	Women's Super League	20	3	4	1	2	0	—		26	4
Liverpool	2025–26	Women's Super League	4	0	0	0	0	0	—		4	0
Liverpool	2026–27	Women's Super League	7	0	0	0	3	4	—		10	4
Liverpool	Total		53	8	7	1	9	4	0	0	69	13
Career total			151	24	16	3	9	4	4	0	177	31

=== International ===
As of match played 21 February 2025

Appearances and goals by national team and year
National team	Year	Apps	Goals
Austria	2019	2	0
Austria	2020	3	0
Austria	2021	10	5
Austria	2022	9	1
Austria	2023	10	1
Austria	2024	10	0
Austria	2025	1	0
Total		45	7

Scores and results list Austria's goal tally first, score column indicates score after each Höbinger goal.

List of international goals scored by Marie Höbinger
No.	Date	Venue	Opponent	Score	Result	Competition	Ref.
1	23 February 2021	Hibernians Stadium, Paola, Malta	Slovakia	1–0	1–0	Friendly	
2	11 April 2021	Sonnenseestadion, Ritzing, Austria	Finland	2–0	2–2	Friendly	
3	17 September 2021	Daugava Stadium, Liepāja, Latvia	Latvia	1–1	8–1	2023 FIFA Women's World Cup qualification	
4	21 September 2021	Toše Proeski Arena, Skopje, North Macedonia	North Macedonia	1–0	6–0	2023 FIFA Women's World Cup qualification	
5	30 November 2021	Stade de Luxembourg, Luxembourg City, Luxembourg	Luxembourg	6–0	8–0	2023 FIFA Women's World Cup qualification	
6	6 September 2022	Stadion Wiener Neustadt, Wiener Neustadt, Austria	North Macedonia	6–0	10–0	2023 FIFA Women's World Cup qualification	
7	11 April 2023	Stadion Wiener Neustadt, Wiener Neustadt, Austria	Czech Republic	1–0	2–0	Friendly	
8	13 October 2026	Sportclub-Platz Dornbach, Vienna, Austria	Kosovo	1–0	4–0	2027 FIFA Women's World Cup qualification	

== Honours ==
FC Zürich

- Swiss Super League: 2021-22, 2022-23
- Swiss Cup: 2022

Individual

- Liverpool Fans' Player of the Season: 2023–24
- Liverpool Young Player of the Season: 2023–24
- Liverpool Player of the Month: October 2023
