= Sandra Betschart =

Swiss footballer (born 1989)

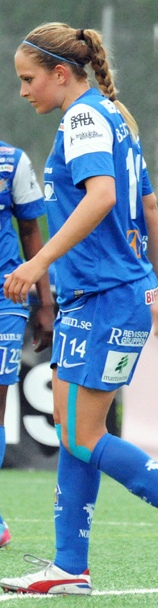

Personal information
- Date of birth: 30 March 1989 (age 37)
- Place of birth: Lucerne, Switzerland
- Height: 1.68 m (5 ft 6 in)
- Positions: Defender; midfielder

Youth career
- 1998–2004: SC Cham

Senior career*
Years	Team	Apps	(Gls)
2004–2005	FC Malters		
2005–2010	FC Zürich		
2011	Kristianstad	9	(0)
2012	FC Yverdon		
2012–2013	VfL Sindelfingen	6	(0)
2013–2016	Sunnanå SK	67	(4)
2016–2017	MSV Duisburg	27	(1)

International career^{‡}
2007–2015	Switzerland	66	(2)
- * Club domestic league appearances and goals as of 1 April 2013 ‡ National team caps and goals as of 19:56, 23 June 2015 (UTC)

Sandra Betschart (born 30 March 1989) is a Swiss former footballer who played as a defender.

== Club career ==
Betschart joined FC Zürich in 2005, having previously played for SC Cham and FC Malters. After playing for Zürich for five years, in 2011 she moved to Kristianstads DFF in Sweden's Damallsvenskan. Following the end of the season, she was transferred to FC Yverdon back in Switzerland, where she played the second half of the 2011–12 Nationalliga before signing for VfL Sindelfingen, a newly promoted team in the German Bundesliga. The midfielder announced her re-signing with VfL Sindelfingen on 25 March 2013. The Switzerland national team member Betschart signed then on 27 March 2013 with Sunnanå SK, a one-year contract running from 1 April 2013.

She returned to Germany for the second half of the 2015–16 season to play for MSV Duisburg of the 2. Bundesliga. The team was promoted back to the Bundesliga for the 2016–17 season.

== International career ==
She made her senior debut for the Swiss national team in February 2007 against Malta. As of January 2013 she had played 49 games and scored two goals since.

== Honours ==
FC Zürich

- Nationalliga A (2): 2008–09, 2009–10
