= Erica Cunningham =

Nicaraguan footballer (born 1993)

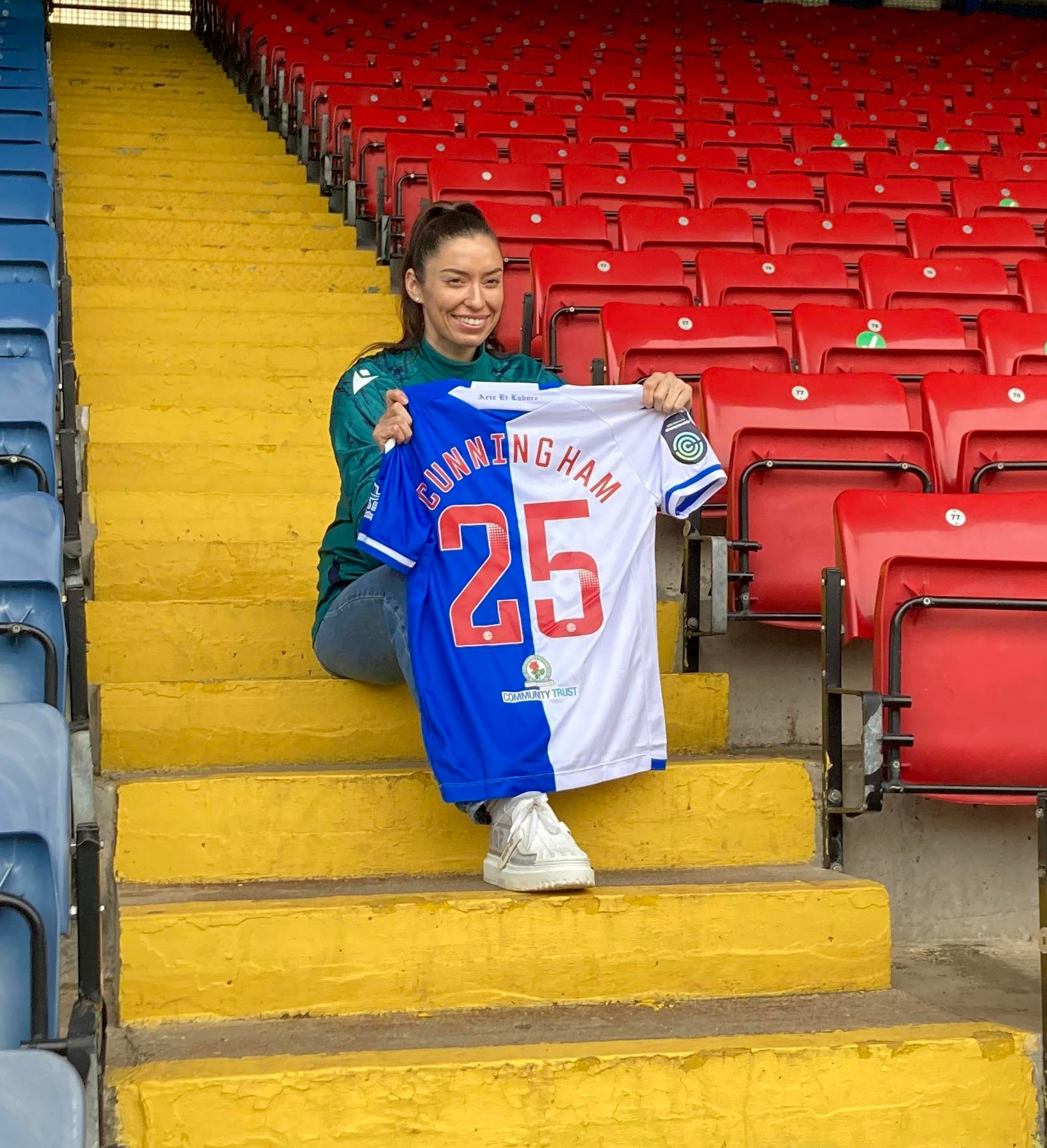
- Cunningham being unveiled by Blackburn Rovers in 2022

Personal information
- Full name: Erica Alicia Cunningham
- Birth name: Erica Alicia Cunningham
- Date of birth: 25 March 1993 (age 33)
- Place of birth: San Francisco, California, U.S.
- Position: Defender

Team information
- Current team: Athlone Town
- Number: 24

Youth career
- Santa Rosa United

College career
Years	Team	Apps	(Gls)
2012–2013	Santa Rosa Bear Cubs		

Senior career*
Years	Team	Apps	(Gls)
2017–2019	Lugano	33	(2)
2019–2020	FC Zürich	9	(1)
2021	Norrköping	12	(0)
2022	Blackburn Rovers	5	
2023–2024	Eastern Flames	7	(0)
2025–	Athlone Town	8	(0)

International career^{‡}
2024–	Nicaragua	6	(0)
- * Club domestic league appearances and goals as of 14 September 2024 ‡ National team caps and goals as of 14 July 2024

Erica Alicia Cunningham Rodríguez (born 25 March 1993) is a professional footballer who plays as a defender for League of Ireland Women's Premier Division club Athlone Town. Born in the United States, she plays for the Nicaragua national team. Cunningham has previously played professionally in Europe for FF Lugano, Zurich and IFK Norrkoping. She is best known for her athleticism, physical strength on the ball, and abilities to use both feet.

== Youth career ==
Cunningham played for Santa Rosa United before moving to the Santa Rosa Junior College where she won the state championship. She transferred to study at the University of San Francisco and represent San Francisco Dons women's soccer in the NCAA Division I.

== Club career ==
Cunningham started her professional playing career with FF Lugano 1976 between 2017 and 2019 in the Swiss Women's Super League before transferring to rivals FC Zurich for the 2019/20 season. She played for Zurich in the 2019/20 UEFA Women's Champions League season.

On 13 July 2021, she was signed by Swedish Elitettan side, IFK Norrkoping.

On 28 January 2022, Cunningham was signed by Blackburn Rovers on a short-term contract ahead of the remainder of the 2021–22 FA Women's Championship season.

== International career ==
Cunningham is eligible to play for either the United States, the Republic of Ireland, Northern Ireland, Mexico or Nicaragua. She made her debut for the latter on 14 July 2024 as a second-half substitution in a 0–0 friendly home draw against Panama.

== Personal life ==
Cunningham can speak Chinese. She is of Mexican, Irish, and Nicaraguan descent.
