= FC Zürich Frauen =

Zürich Frauen
- Full name: Fussballclub Zürich Frauen
- Founded: 21 February 1968; 58 years ago (DFC Zürich); 24 April 1970; 56 years ago (SV Seebach women)
- Ground: Heerenschürli
- Capacity: 1120
- Chairman: Ancillo Canepa
- Manager: Martina Voss-Tecklenburg
- League: Super League
- 2025–26: Swiss Women's Super League 5th of 10
- Website: http://www.fcz.ch

FC Zürich Frauen is a women's association football club from Zürich, Switzerland. Its first team plays since the founding of the Swiss national league in 1970 in the first division. It is the most successful women's football club in the country, with a total of 24 league titles and 16 Cup titles.

== History ==
FC Zürich Frauen was founded on 24 April 1970 as a section of SV Seebach, a football club founded 1916 from the Zurich city quarter of Seebach. In 1980 the team won its first championship; one year later the team won the double. By 2005 it had achieved 12 championships and 7 cup wins.

That year the women's team of SV Seebach Zürich was spun off from the original club and rebranded under the name FFC Zürich Seebach. Between 2005 and 2008, both the 13th championship and the 8th win of the Swiss Cup followed.

In summer 2008, the team was combined with FC Zürich. The name FFC Zürich Seebach was changed into FC Zürich Frauen. The first Swiss women's football team had been founded on 21 February 1968 under the helm of FC Zürich as DFC Zürich, but later discontinued. In summer 2010, FC Zürich Frauen moved its home for league games and practice from Seebach to the Heerenschürli sport park in the city quarter of Hirzenbach, where youth teams of FC Zürich were already based. In 2021, the club opened a new "Home of FC Zürich" to bring the men's, women's and youth teams under one roof.

FC Zürich Frauen is Swiss record champion before the women's team of BSC YB Frauen (including titles of FFC Bern and DFC Bern). After 10 years without the championship title the team won it in 2008 and was able to defend it in 2009 and 2010.

In the UEFA competitions, Zürich reached the 2nd qualifying round in the 2008–09 UEFA Women's Cup. In the 2009-10 and 2010–11 UEFA Women's Champions League they reached the round of 32, and lost there to Linköping and Torres. In 2012-2013, the team played 1:1 and 0:1 in the round of 32 against the French top team Juvisy. In the 2013-2014 Champions League competition, FC Zürich was the first Swiss women's team to reach the Champions League round of 16 after playing 2:1 and 1:1 against Sparta Prague in the round of 32. In the following stage, the team lost against FC Barcelona 0:3 and 1:3.

After winning the double on the national stage in 2022 with wins in the Swiss Cup final against local rival Grasshopper Club Zürich (4–1) in front of a record crowd for a national women's football game of 7,916 people at the Letzigrund and a win against Servette FCCF in the penalty shoot-out in the Playoff-Final of the Women's Super League, the team of coach Inka Grings could qualify for the only recently introduced group stage of the UEFA Women's Champions League for the very first time. Despite some good efforts and an outstanding goal from Seraina Piubel at the London's Emirates Stadium against Arsenal, the team lost all of their six games against three opponents that are considered heavy-weights in European football.

In January 2023 Inka Grings was appointed as new national coach of the Swiss women's national team and FC Zürich presented Jacqueline Dünker as their manager. After a 0–3 away defeat in the Cup semi-final against main rival Servette in March, the team could once again bounce back and won all remaining games of the season including the final of the Swiss Women's Super League 2022-23. Just like the year before, Zürich qualified as second-ranked team for the playoffs, but then beat the slightly favored Servette FCCF in the final for the second year in a row.

Dünker's team reached the Playoff final for the third time in a row in 2023-2024, despite finishing the regular season only as third. However, this time they were eventually beaten by Servette.

This game also marked the end of an era. Captain Fabienne Humm announced her retirement in May 2024, ending her career after playing over 400 games and scoring more than 300 goals for the club since 2009.

In summer 2024 the club went through some major changes. First coach Jacqueline Dünker announced her departure. During the summer longtime players like Julia Stierli or Seraina Piubel also left the club to find new challenges in bigger leagues abroad.

Under the new direction of Dünker's successor Renato Gligoroski, the club's philosophy focused more on developing and integrating own academy players into their first squad. This came also after the termination of the FC Zürich U21 team, which was for years the only academy team playing in Switzerland's second tier.

Despite a very young and mostly inexperienced squad, FC Zürich managed to win the Swiss Cup again in March 2025 against heavily favored FC Basel. The 1–0 win in the final not only marked the first win of the competition since 2022, but with 16 wins it also made FC Zürich the sole record champion of the competition.

== Stadium ==
The Heerenschürli sport park serves as home ground for most of the national league and cup games women's team of FC Zürich. International games were played first at the Schützenwiese stadium in Winterthur, but since 2012, the games are hosted at the Letzigrund stadium in Zürich.

On 13 November 2013, 7,304 fans watched the round of 16 second leg game against FC Barcelona, which was a record attendance for Swiss women's football for many years. Servette FC Chênois Féminin broke the record in 2021, when they had 12,782 people at their home game against Chelsea F.C. Women in the newly introduced group stage of the UEFA Women's Champions League.

However, when FC Zürich Frauen also qualified for the group stage a year later in 2022, the club's home stadium Letzigrund was not available due to scheduling issues. The three matches against Juventus, Lyon and Arsenal then were played at the FCS Arena Schaffhausen, about 40 km away from Zürich. The stadium's capacity of 8,000 then prevented another record attendance.

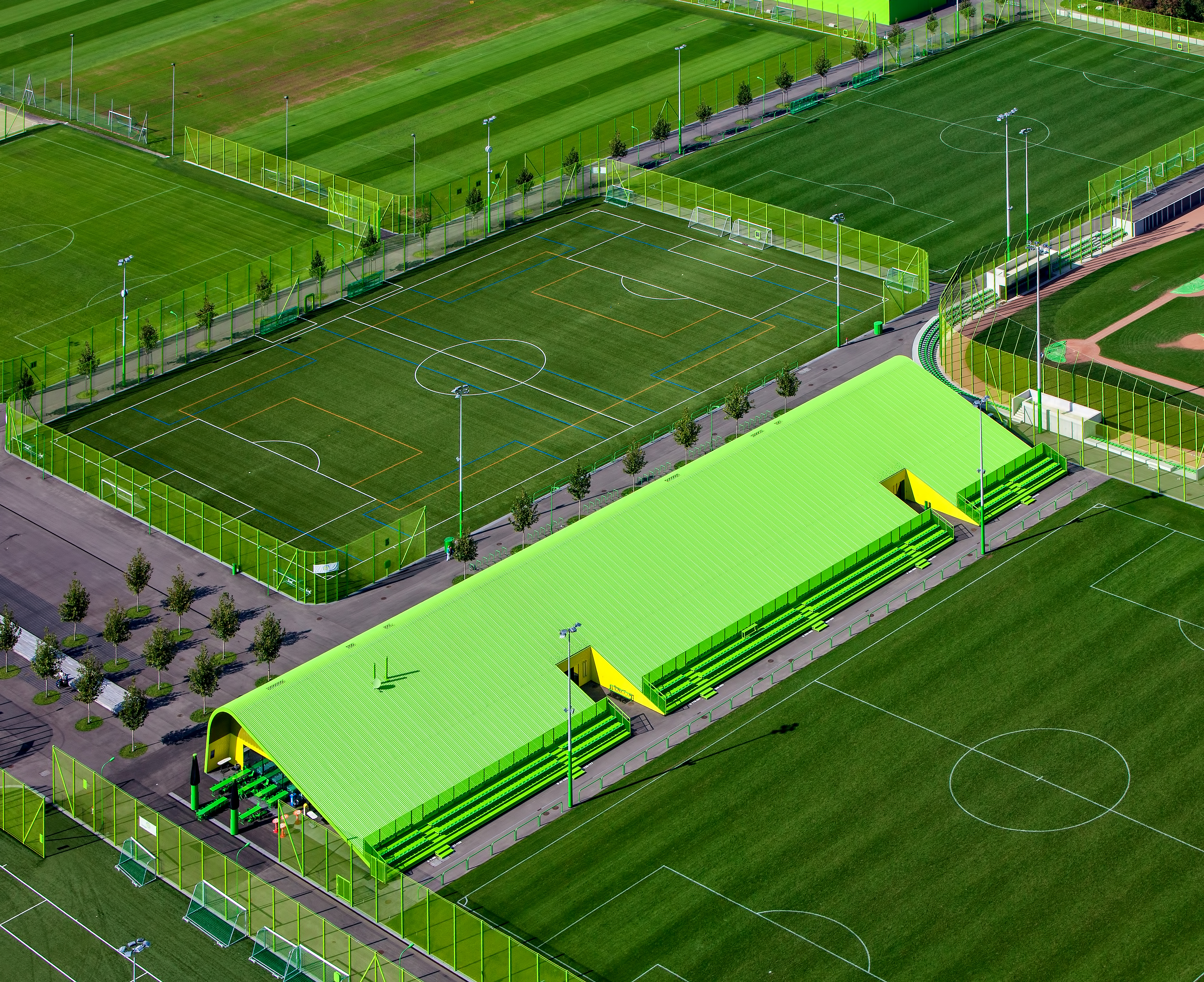
The sport park Heerenschürli is FC Zürich Frauen's home ground for their league and cup games.

== Titles ==
=== Official ===
- Swiss Champion (24):
  - as SV Seebach Zürich: 12 (1980, 1981, 1982, 1983, 1985, 1987, 1988, 1990, 1991, 1993, 1994, 1998)
  - as FFC Zürich Seebach: 1 (2008)
  - as FC Zürich Frauen: 11 (2009, 2010, 2012, 2013, 2014, 2015, 2016, 2018, 2019, 2022, 2023)
- Swiss Cup Champion (16):
  - as SV Seebach Zürich: 7 (1981, 1986, 1987, 1988, 1989, 1990, 1993)
  - as FFC Zürich Seebach: 1 (2007)
  - as FC Zürich Frauen: 8 (2012, 2013, 2015, 2016, 2018, 2019, 2022, 2025)

=== Invitational ===
- Menton Tournament: 1 (1990)

== Current squad ==
As of 2 July 2026

Note: Flags indicate national team as defined under FIFA eligibility rules; some limited exceptions apply. Players may hold more than one non-FIFA nationality.

| No. | Pos. | Nation | Player |
|---|---|---|---|
| 1 | GK | USA | Faith Hutchins |
| 2 | DF | USA | Briana Eads |
| 4 | DF | SUI | Riana Brändle |
| 5 | DF | SUI | Naomi Mégroz (captain) |
| 6 | DF | SUI | Luana Bürge |
| 7 | DF | IRL | Diane Caldwell |
| 8 | MF | GER | Amelie Schuster |
| 9 | FW | GER | Chiara Bücher |
| 10 | FW | AUT | Amelie Roduner |
| 11 | FW | GHA | Wasiima Mohammed |
| 12 | GK | SUI | Yasmine Ammar |
| 13 | MF | SUI | Joy Lysser |
| 14 | FW | SVN | Nina Kajzba |
| 15 | FW | SUI | Rahel Hinder |

| No. | Pos. | Nation | Player |
|---|---|---|---|
| 16 | MF | SUI | Shanae Tsawa |
| 17 | MF | SUI | Derin Degirmenler |
| 18 | MF | SUI | Zoe Dönni |
| 19 | FW | HUN | Borbála Vincze |
| 20 | FW | SUI | Martina Cavar |
| 21 | GK | SUI | Riana Gmür |
| 22 | DF | SUI | Larissa Uetz |
| 23 | MF | SUI | Anna Matsushita |
| 24 | FW | SUI | Kim Dubs |
| 26 | MF | SRB | Sanja Kovačević |
| 28 | MF | SUI | Nevia Stoob |
| 29 | DF | SUI | Luisa Blumenthal |
| 30 | FW | ITA | Sury Lamontana |

=== Former players ===
- (Canada) Adriana Leon
- (Switzerland) Alayah Pilgrim
- (Switzerland) Elvira Herzog
- (Nicaragua) Erica Cunningham
- (Switzerland) Livia Peng
- (Switzerland) Luana Bühler
- (Austria) Marie Höbinger
- (Switzerland) Nadine Riesen
- (Switzerland) Noelle Maritz
- (Poland) Oliwia Wos
- (Switzerland) Seraina Piubel
- (Switzerland) Sydney Schertenleib
- (Finland) Susanna Heikari
