= Alyssa Lagonia =

Canadian soccer player

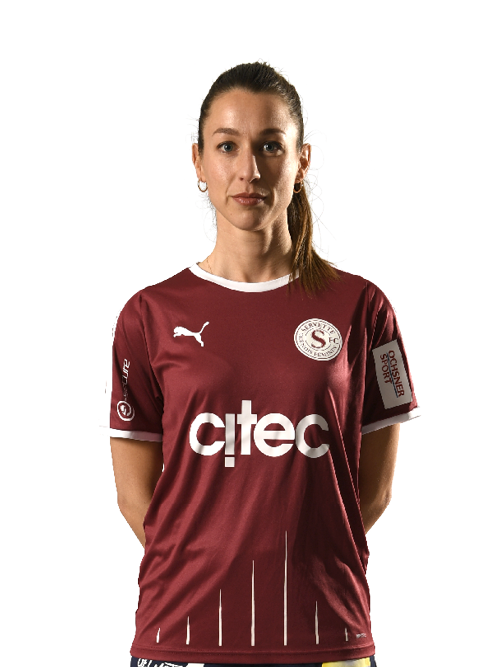

Personal information
- Full name: Alyssa Ann Lagonia
- Date of birth: 30 June 1989 (age 37)
- Place of birth: Kitchener, Ontario, Canada
- Height: 1.67 m (5 ft 6 in)
- Position: Midfielder

Youth career
- 2007–2011: Wilfrid Laurier Golden Hawks

Senior career*
Years	Team	Apps	(Gls)
2008–2009	Toronto Lady Lynx	16	(1)
2010–2011	Ottawa Fury	22	(1)
2012	Doncaster Rovers Belles	14	(2)
2013–2014	Bardolino Verona	39	(8)
2014–2017	Neunkirch		
2017–2019	Apollon Ladies		
2019–2022	Servette Chênois		

International career^{‡}
2008	Canada U20	2	(0)
2009	Canada	4	(0)
- * Club domestic league appearances and goals as of 15:11, 15 December 2022 (UTC) ‡ National team caps and goals as of 15:11, 15 December 2022 (UTC)

Alyssa Ann Lagonia (born 30 June 1989) is a Canadian former professional soccer player who was a midfielder for Swiss Women's Super League club Servette Chênois and the Canada national team. She previously played for Apollon Ladies in Cyprus, Bardolino Verona in Italy, Doncaster Rovers Belles in England and in the W-League for Toronto Lady Lynx and Ottawa Fury.

== Club career ==
=== Early career ===
From 2008 to 2011, Lagonia played in the W-League for both the Toronto Lady Lynx and the Ottawa Fury. In March 2012, Lagonia signed a professional contract with Doncaster Rovers Belles. In January 2013, she signed for Italian club Bardolino Verona. She would go on to a play for Swiss club Neunkirch and Apollon Ladies F.C. in the Cypriot First Division.

=== Servette Chênois ===
In 2019, she signed a contract to join Swiss club Servette Chênois. She announced her playing retirement in July 2022, but she continued to be employed at UEFA headquarters in Nyon.

== International career ==
Lagonia made her senior international debut for Canada in March 2009, playing against New Zealand at the Cyprus Cup.

== Honours ==
=== Club ===
Servette Chênois

- Swiss Women's Super League: 2020-21

== See also ==
- Foreign players in the FA WSL
