= Sanja Kovačević =

Serbian politician (born 1968)

Sanja Kovačević (Serbian Cyrillic: Сања Ковачевић; born 29 December 1968) is a politician in Serbia. She has served in the Assembly of Vojvodina since 2016 as a member of the Serbian Progressive Party.

== Private career ==
Kovačević holds a bachelor's degree in agricultural economics and engineering. She lives in the town of Mačvanska Mitrovica in Sremska Mitrovica.

== Politician ==
Kovačević entered politics as a member of the far-right Serbian Radical Party and was a party candidate in the 2008 Serbian local elections in Sremska Mitrovica. The Radicals experienced a serious split later in 2008, with several members joining the more moderate Progressive Party under the leadership of Tomislav Nikolić and Aleksandar Vučić. Kovačević sided with the Progressives.

She appeared in the thirtieth position on the Progressive Party's electoral list in Sremska Mitrovica for the 2012 local elections and was not elected when the list won only twelve mandates. She worked in the city administration for economy and entrepreneurship during this period, and in 2015 she was appointed to a newly formed council addressing the problems of refugees and internally displaced persons in the city.

Kovačević received the thirty-seventh position on the Progressive Party's list in the 2016 Vojvodina provincial election and was elected when the list won a majority victory with sixty-three out of 120 mandates. She was later given the seventy-third position on the party's list in the 2020 provincial election and was narrowly re-elected when the list won an increased majority with seventy-six mandates. She is currently a member of the assembly committee on agriculture.
