= 2023–24 Swiss Women's Super League =

Swiss Women's Super League
- Season: 2023–24
- Dates: 26 August 2023 – 26 May 2024
- Champions: Servette (2nd title)
- UEFA Women's Champions League: Servette
- Matches played: 105

The 2023–24 Swiss Women's Super League (referred to as the Axa Women's Super League for sponsoring reasons) was the 54nd season of top-tier competitive women's football in Switzerland.

== Format ==
In the regular season, the eight teams of the 2022–23 Playoffs are joined by the two winners of relegation/promotion playoff, Rapperswil-Jona and Thun. At the end of the first phase, the eight top teams advance to the playoffs. The bottom two teams are joined by the top two teams of the Nationalliga B in the relegation playoff.

The winner of the playoffs is crowned Swiss Champion and qualifies to the UEFA Women's Champions League.

The top two teams of the Relegation Playoff are qualified for the 2024–25 Swiss Women's Super League, the bottom two are relegated to 2023–24 Nationalliga B. The four teams will play each play home and away games against each other. Top two teams will play the 2023–24 Swiss Women's Super League, bottom two are relegated to the Nationalliga B.

== Teams ==
Location of the 2023–24 Swiss Women's Super League teams

Team	Location	Stadium
FC Aarau Frauen	Aarau	Sportanlage Schachen
FC Basel	Basel	Sportanlagen St. Jakob
Grasshoppers Club Zürich	Niederhasli	GC/Campus
FC Luzern	Lucerne	Sportanlagen Allmend
FC Rapperswil-Jona	Rapperswil-Jona	Stadion Grünfeld
Servette FC Chênois Féminin	Grand-Lancy	Stade de la Fontenette
FC St. Gallen Frauen	St. Gallen	Stadion Espenmoos
FC Rot-Schwarz Thun	Thun	Stadion Lachen
BSC YB Frauen	Bern	Stadion Wankdorf
FC Zürich Frauen	Zürich	Heerenschürli
