= Renato Gligoroski =

Macedonian football player, coach (born 1976)

Personal information
- Full name: Renato Gligoroski; Ренато Глигороски
- Date of birth: 4 November 1976 (age 49)
- Place of birth: Vienna, Austria
- Height: 1.93 m (6 ft 4 in)
- Position: Midfielder

Youth career
- SC Perchtoldsdorf

Senior career*
Years	Team	Apps	(Gls)
1995–1997	Mödling	25	(3)
1997–2003	SC Perchtoldsdorf	155	(63)
2003	L.A. Riverside	10	(2)
2003–2007	Brunn/Geb. SC	40	(5)
2007–2008	ASK Marienthal	13	(2)
2008–2009	SC Ritzing	15	(0)
2009–2011	Union AC Mauer	45	(7)

Managerial career
- 2011–2012: SC Perchtoldsdorf
- 2014: SKN St. Pölten (assistant)
- 2014-2015: Austria Wien (assistant)
- 2017–2018: Mattersburg (assistant)
- * Club domestic league appearances and goals

Renato Gligoroski (Macedonian: Ренато Глигороски) was born (4 November 1976 in Vienna, Austria) and is currently a UEFA "A" licensed football/soccer coach from the Republic of Macedonia. Apart from his professional coaching license he is also a professional engineer in Austria.

== Playing career ==
As a player, he played professionally in the Austrian Football Second League for VfB Mödling. He also played for other clubs in lower leagues in Austria such as: SC Perchtoldsdorf, L.A. Riverside, Brunn/Geb. SC, ASK Marienthal, SC Ritzing, and Union AC Mauer.

== Managerial career ==
After Gligoroski ended his playing career he took over the coaching position in SC Perchtoldsdorf, where he played during his youth years. Prior to taking the head coach position at SC Perchtoldsdorf, Gligoroski was team manager for the Austria national under-17 football team and head of department for children and youth football/soccer in the Austrian Football Association. During his time at the Austrian Football Association, he visited several conferences and symposiums throughout the world, some of which include: FIFA Women's Football Symposium in 2003, UEFA Grassroots Conference in 2004, and UEFA Futsal Conference in 2005.
