= Paula Serrano =

Spanish footballer (born 1991)

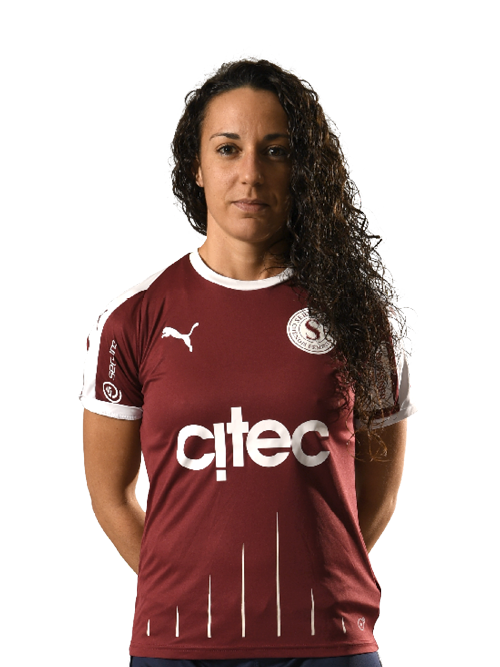
- Serrano in 2020

Personal information
- Full name: Paula Serrano Castaño
- Date of birth: 27 January 1991 (age 35)
- Place of birth: Plasencia, Spain
- Height: 1.63 m (5 ft 4 in)
- Position: Midfielder

Team information
- Current team: Servette
- Number: 8

Senior career*
Years	Team	Apps	(Gls)
2007–2014	Atlético Madrid		
2014–2015	Torres	23	(6)
2015–2016	Granada		
2016–2017	FC Neunkirch		
2017–2018	Madrid CFF	23	(1)
2018–	Servette		
- * Club domestic league appearances and goals

Paula Serrano Castaño is a Spanish football midfielder, currently playing for Servette in the Swiss Nationalliga A.

Serrano played for Atlético Madrid in the Spanish First Division. In 2014, she moved to Torres Calcio of the Italian Serie A, returning to Spain a year later where she played for Granada CF.

In 2016, she signed with FC Neunkirch of the Swiss Nationalliga A.

As an Under-19 international she played the 2010 U-19 European Championship.
