= Nationalliga B (women's football) =

- Country: Switzerland
- Confederation: UEFA
- Level on pyramid: 2
- Relegation to: 1. Liga
- Domestic cup: Swiss Cup
- Current champions: FC Yverdon Féminin (2023–24)
- Current: 2026–27 Nationalliga B

Nationalliga B is the second-tier women's league in the Swiss football league system.

== Champions ==
- 1999/00 - FC Rot-Schwarz
- 2024/25 - FC Yverdon Féminin
