= FC Luzern Frauen =

- Founded: 26 April 2004
- Ground: Stadion Allmend, Lucerne
- Capacity: 13,000
- Manager: Luzia Odermatt
- League: Swiss Women's Super League
- 2025–26: 9th
- Website: https://fcl-spitzenfussballfrauen.ch/
| Home colours | Away colours |

FC Luzern Frauen is a women's football club from Lucerne, Switzerland. The team is the successor of the women's section of FC Sursee, and was named SC LUwin.ch at the start.

== History ==
=== LUwin.ch ===
After the Swiss Football Association allowed dedicated women's football clubs to be founded in 2004, SC LUwin.ch announced independence by founding Switzerland's first purely women's club. In the club's former name LU stands for Luzern, win shows the team's winner mentality, .ch is for Switzerland.

The team was 2 time Swiss champion, when LUwin.ch was founded and three titles followed directly in the next seasons. In 2007-08 the team began to struggle with a 7th-place finish in the Nationalliga A (women's football). Only a better goal difference than FC Rot-Schwarz Thun prevented relegation. The next season Luwin.ch finished last and was relegated to the Nationalliga B. The 2009–10 season was a disaster for the team. After 18 games, the team only had 5 points to its name and was relegated into the local 1. Liga, the third level of Swiss women's football.

=== Merger with SC Kriens ===
For the 2014–15 season three teams of SC Kriens joined FC Luzern. They were a team in the Nationalliga A, and Under-18 and U-16 youth teams. The merger was agreed on to join forces in the central Switzerland region.

== European Record ==
UEFA Women's Cup:

- 2002-03: Second qualifying round, 2nd place (as FC Sursee)
- 2005-06: Second qualifying round, 3rd place (as FC Lucerne)

== Players ==
=== Current squad ===
As of 2 June 2026

Note: Flags indicate national team as defined under FIFA eligibility rules; some limited exceptions apply. Players may hold more than one non-FIFA nationality.

| No. | Pos. | Nation | Player |
|---|---|---|---|
| 1 | GK | SUI | Lea Kramoviku |
| 2 | DF | GER | Katja Orschmann |
| 3 | DF | SUI | Lena Wälti |
| 7 | DF | SUI | Rahel Sager |
| 8 | DF | GER | Romy Baraniak |
| 16 | MF | GER | Barbara Reger |
| 17 | DF | SWE | Jennie Egeriis |
| 18 | MF | GER | Aldiana Amuchie |
| 19 | FW | SUI | Sarah Schildknecht |
| 20 | MF | SUI | Ana Meyer |

| No. | Pos. | Nation | Player |
|---|---|---|---|
| 21 | MF | SUI | Melissa Rondalli |
| 22 | FW | SUI | Fiona Sperlich |
| 26 | DF | SUI | Liel Rickenbach |
| 28 | FW | ROU | Cristina Carp |
| 36 | MF | SUI | Ramona Schallberger |
| 38 | MF | SUI | Chiara Schmid |
| 99 | FW | SUI | Alyssa Keller |
| — | MF | GRE | Athanasia Moraitou |
| — | GK | SUI | Laura Vogt |
| — | FW | KOS | Alketa Rama |

== Titles ==
- Swiss Super League (5):

2002, 2003 (as FC Sursee), 2004, 2005, 2006 (as LUwin.ch)

- Swiss Cup (4):

2002, 2004 (as FC Sursee), 2005, 2006 (as LUwin.ch)
