= Swiss Women's Cup =

Schweizer Cup Frauen / Coupe Suisse Femmes / Coppa Svizzera Donne / Cuppa Svizra Dunna
- Founded: 1975
- Region: Switzerland
- Teams: 60
- Current champions: FC Zürich Frauen (16th title)
- Most championships: FC Zürich Frauen (16 titles)
- Broadcaster(s): SRG SSR (Final) abseits.ch (selected Games)
- 2024–25 Women's Cup

The Swiss Women's Cup (German: Schweizer Cup; French: Coupe de Suisse; Italian: Coppa Svizzera; Romansh: Cuppa Svizra) is a women's football cup tournament that has been organised annually since 1975 by the Swiss Football Association (SFV-ASF).

== Finals ==
All final matches are:

Season	Cupwinner	Runner-up	Result	Location
1976	DFC Sion	DFC Aarau	5–1	Willisau
1977	DFC Sion	SV Seebach Zürich	7–2	Näfels
1978	FC Bern	SV Seebach Zürich	4–3 (a.e.t.)	Herzogenbuchsee
1979	FC Spreitenbach	FC Zürich	1–0	Stans
1980	FC Bern	FC Therwil	4–0	Bad Ragaz
1981	SV Seebach Zürich	FC Blue Stars Zürich	4–1	Winterthur
1982	FC Bern	SV Seebach Zürich	0–0 (a.e.t.), 3–1 (p)	Zug
1983	FC Bern	FC Blue Stars Zürich	1–0	Volketswil
1984	FC Bern	FC Rudolfstetten	3–0	Stäfa
1985	FC Bern	SV Seebach Zürich	5–4 (a.e.t.)	Sursee
1986	SV Seebach Zürich	FC Bern	3–0	Seebach
1987	SV Seebach Zürich	FC Bern	2–2 (a.e.t.), 4–2 (p)	Derendingen
1988	SV Seebach Zürich	FC Rapid Lugano	4–0	Alterswil
1989	SV Seebach Zürich	FC Rapid Lugano	2–0	Baden
1990	SV Seebach Zürich	FC Bern	3–3 (a.e.t.), 4–3 (p)	Gossau
1991	FC Bern	SV Seebach Zürich	6–2	Locarno
1992	FC Schwerzenbach	FC Bern	1–0 (a.e.t.)	Baden
1993	SV Seebach Zürich	FC Blue Stars Zürich	3–2	Zürich
1994	FC Bern	SV Seebach Zürich	1–0	Bern
1995	FC Bern	SV Seebach Zürich	4–2	Bern
1996	FC Bern	FC Rapid Lugano	5–1	Muri bei Bern
1997	FC Bern	FC Blue Stars Zürich	6–0	Thun
1998	FC Bern	SV Seebach Zürich	1–0	La Chaux-de-Fonds
1999	FC Bern	FC Schwerzenbach	3–3 (a.e.t.) 4–2 (p)	Effretikon
2000	FC Bern	FC Schwerzenbach	2–0	Rapperswil
2001	FC Bern	FC Sursee	4–0	Basel
2002	FC Sursee	FC Bern	2–1	Basel
2003	FC Schwerzenbach	FC Bern	1–1 (a.e.t.), 4–1 (p)	Basel
2004	FC Sursee	FC Malters	2–0	Basel
2005	SC LUwin.ch Luzern	SV Seebach Zürich	3–1	Basel
2006	SC LUwin.ch Luzern	FFC Zürich Seebach	5–0	Bern
2007	FFC Zürich Seebach	FFC Zuchwil 05	2–1	Bern
2008	FFC United Schwerzenbach	FFC Bern	4–2	Bern
2009	FC Rot-Schwarz Thun	FC Schlieren	8–0	Bern
2010	Yverdon Féminin	YB Frauen	3–2 (a.e.t.)	Bern
2011	Yverdon Féminin	YB Frauen	2–0	Winterthur
2012	FC Zürich Frauen	SC Kriens	2–1 (a.e.t.)	Aarau
2013	FC Zürich Frauen	FC Basel	5–0	
2014	FC Basel	SC Kriens	2–1	
2015	FC Zürich Frauen	FC Basel	5–0	Jona
2016	FC Zürich Frauen	FC Neunkirch	2–0	Biel/Bienne
2017	FC Neunkirch	FC Zürich Frauen	1–1 (a.e.t.), 7–6 (p)	Biel/Bienne
2018	FC Zürich Frauen	FF Lugano	1–0 a.e.t.	Biel/Bienne
2019	FC Zürich Frauen	YB Frauen	5–0	Biel/Bienne
2020	abandoned			
2021	FC Luzern Frauen	FC Zürich Frauen	2–0	Zürich
2022	FC Zürich Frauen	GC Frauen	4–1	Zürich
2023	Servette FC Chênois Féminin	FC St.Gallen 1879	1–0	Zürich
2024	Servette FC Chênois Féminin	YB Frauen	3–2	Zürich
2025	FC Zürich Frauen	FC Basel	1–0	Zürich

=== Titles by club ===
Club	Winners	Winning years
FC Zürich Frauen (incl. FFC Zürich-Seebach)	16	1981, 1986, 1987, 1988, 1989, 1990, 1993, 2007, 2012, 2013, 2015, 2016, 2018, 2019, 2022, 2025
YB Frauen (incl. FFC Bern)	15	1978, 1980, 1982, 1983, 1984, 1985, 1991, 1994, 1995, 1996, 1997, 1998, 1999, 2000, 2001
FC Luzern Frauen (incl. FC Sursee and SC LUwin.ch)	5	2002, 2004, 2005, 2006, 2021
FC Schwerzenbach	3	1992, 2003, 2008
FC Sion	2	1976, 1977
Yverdon Féminin	2	2010, 2011
Servette FC Chênois Féminin	2	2023, 2024
FC Spreitenbach	1	1979
FC Rot-Schwarz Thun	1	2009
FC Basel	1	2014
FC Neunkirch	1	2017
