= FC Yverdon Féminin =

Swiss football club

- Full name: FC Yverdon Féminin
- Founded: February 1986
- League: Nationalliga A
- 2022–24: 9th
- Website: http://www.fcyverdonfeminin.ch/
Home colours	Away colours

FC Yverdon Féminin is a Swiss women's football team from the town of Yverdon-les-Bains. Founded in 1986 as the women's section of Yverdon-Sport FC has played in Switzerland's highest league, the Nationalliga A since the 2006–07 season. In July 2007 it became an independent club, taking its current name.

In 2010, the team won the Swiss Cup against Young Boys Bern, a feat which they repeated in 2011, when they were also the championship's runner-up. In subsequent seasons it has returned to mid-table positions.

== Honours ==
=== Trophies ===
- 2 Swiss Cups

2010, 2011

=== Competition record ===
Season	Division	Place	Coupe de Suisse
1994–95	3	?	
1995–96	2	4 / 10	
1996–97	2	3 / 10	
1997–98	2	2 / 10	
1998–99	1	10 / 10	
1999–00	2	2 / 10	Semifinals
2000–01	1	10 / 10	Quarterfinals
2001–02	2	5 / 12	Round of 32
2002–03	2	3 / 12	Round of 32
2003–04	2	4 / 12	Round of 32
2004–05	2	6 / 12	Round of 32
2005–06	2	1 / 12	Round of 32
2006–07	1	5 / 8	Round of 32
2007–08	1	4 / 8	Round of 16
2008–09	1	4 / 10	Semifinals
2009–10	1	3 / 10	Champion
2010–11	1	2 / 10	Champion
2011–12	1	6 / 10	Quarterfinals
2012–13	1	5 / 10	Round of 16

== 2022–23 squad ==
According to the club's website Note: Flags indicate national team as defined under FIFA eligibility rules; some limited exceptions apply. Players may hold more than one non-FIFA nationality.

No.	Pos.	Nation	Player
—	GK	SUI	Anaëlle Nicli
—	GK	SUI	Claudine Grand
—	DF	SUI	Audrey Duclos
—	DF	SUI	Carolyn Mallaun
—	DF	SUI	Cristel Miocevic
—	DF	SUI	Mirjana Pajovic
—	DF	SUI	Aline Pinferetti
—	DF	SUI	Joanna Putzeys
—	MF	SUI	Smiljana Bartlomé
—	MF	SUI	Virginie Clivaz
—	MF	SUI	Annouck Darbellay
—	MF	SUI	Marianne Di Pasquale

No.	Pos.	Nation	Player
—	MF	SUI	Gwendoline Fai
—	MF	SUI	Valérie Gillioz
—	MF	SUI	Cindy Maerchy
—	MF	SUI	Camille Monti
—	MF	SUI	Vanessa Pittet
—	MF	SUI	Audrey Riat
—	MF	SUI	Sophie Tardy
—	FW	SUI	Anne-Sophie Morand
—	FW	SUI	Audrey Wuichet

=== Former internationals ===
- Switzerland: Sandra Betschart, Jehona Mehmeti
