= Servette FC Chênois Féminin =

Swiss women's football club

- Full name: Servette FC Chênois Féminin
- Nickname: Les Grenat
- Founded: 1974
- Ground: Stade des Trois-Chêne
- Capacity: 4,000
- Chairman: Yoann Brigante
- Manager: José Barcala
- League: Swiss Women's Super League
- 2025–26: Swiss Women's Super League, Champions of 10
- Website: https://www.servettefc.ch/index.php/actualites-feminin
| Home colours | Away colours | Third colours |

Servette FC Chênois Féminin (French pronunciation: [sɛʁvɛt ɛfse ʃɛnwa feminɛ̃]) is a women's football club from Geneva, Switzerland. Its first team plays in the top tier in Switzerland and often in UEFA Champions League.

== History ==
Servette FC Chênois was founded in 1974 as the women's section of Club Sportif Chênois, named for the Chêne area. In 2012, it was spun off from the original club and rebranded under the name Football Féminin Chênois Genève. In 2017, the team was combined with Servette FC and renamed Servette FC Chênois Féminin.

In 2018, the club was promoted for the first time in National League A and reached the 4th rank. The next season, when the tournament had to be stopped due to COVID-19, Servette was standing at the first rank, and was therefore qualified for 2020–21 Champions League. The club reached the round of 32 and was eliminated by Atlético Madrid.

Servette FC Chênois won their first Super League title in the 2020–21 season.

== Titles ==
- Swiss Women's Super League (3) : 2020–21, 2023–24, 2025–26
- Swiss Women's Cup (2) : 2023, 2024
- National League B: 2018

== Current squad ==
As of 23 July 2026

Note: Flags indicate national team as defined under FIFA eligibility rules; some limited exceptions apply. Players may hold more than one non-FIFA nationality.

| No. | Pos. | Nation | Player |
|---|---|---|---|
| 1 | GK | ESP | Enith Salón |
| 2 | MF | SUI | Laura Tufo |
| 3 | DF | SUI | Léa Sergeant-Huet |
| 4 | DF | FRA | Daïna Bourma |
| 6 | MF | ESP | Paola Hernández |
| 7 | FW | MTQ | Maëva Salomon |
| 8 | FW | ESP | Asun Martinez |
| 9 | FW | ITA | Gloria Marinelli |
| 10 | MF | ALG | Ghoutia Karchouni |
| 11 | FW | POL | Magdalena Sobal |
| 13 | GK | NED | Jacintha Weimar |
| 14 | MF | ESP | Cristina Librán (on loan from Juventus) |

| No. | Pos. | Nation | Player |
|---|---|---|---|
| 18 | DF | VEN | Yenifer Giménez |
| 19 | MF | ESP | Paula Serrano |
| 21 | MF | NED | Laura Strik |
| 22 | DF | SUI | Chiara Wallin |
| 23 | DF | SUI | Amina Muratović |
| 24 | DF | POR | Joana Marchão |
| 30 | GK | SEN | Mickaëla Bottega |
| 31 | GK | SUI | Leyla Laubscher |
| 32 | GK | SUI | Abby Blanco |
| 38 | FW | SUI | Garance Nein |
| 66 | MF | MAR | Elodie Nakkach |
| 78 | DF | GHA | Bénédicte Simon |

== Former players ==
- (Canada) Alyssa Lagonia
- (Poland) Natalia Padilla

== See also ==
- Servette FC
- Swiss Women's Super League
