= FC Basel Frauen =

- Founded: 2009
- Ground: Leichtathletik-Stadion St. Jakob
- Capacity: 6,000
- Manager: Kim Kulig
- League: Swiss Women's Super League
- 2025–26: Swiss Women's Super League 3rd of 10
- Website: https://www.fcb.ch/en-US/Teams/Frauen

FC Basel Frauen is a women's football team of the club FC Basel from Basel, Switzerland. It competes in the Swiss Women's Super League.

== History ==
They finished second in the 2017–18 season and made their European debut in the 2018–19 UEFA Women's Champions League.

== Titles ==
- Swiss Women's Cup winner: 1 (2014)

== Players ==
=== Current squad ===
As of 9 September 2026

Note: Flags indicate national team as defined under FIFA eligibility rules; some limited exceptions apply. Players may hold more than one non-FIFA nationality.

No.	Pos.	Nation	Player
1	GK	SUI	Selina Wölfle
4	DF	SUI	Andrea Jäggi
5	DF	LIE	Lena Göppel
6	MF	SUI	Fabia Reinschmidt
7	FW	SUI	Tyara Buser
8	FW	NZL	Jacqui Hand
9	FW	DEN	Anna Krog
10	FW	POL	Julia Matuschewski
11	FW	SUI	Mara Tauriello
13	MF	SUI	Lena Bucher
14	MF	JPN	Mai Hirata
15	MF	ENG	Romia Gagliano

No.	Pos.	Nation	Player
17	FW	EST	Anželinka Jotkina
18	MF	SUI	Coumba Sow (captain)
19	FW	ITA	Alice Berti
21	MF	USA	Alisa Arthur
22	FW	GER	Zita Rurack
23	FW	SUI	Lea Eisenring
24	DF	SUI	Lola Brügger
25	GK	FIN	Nanna Leivonen
26	DF	SUI	Mia Bennewitz
27	MF	SUI	Emilia Soiron
28	DF	SUI	Elea Hagmann
30	DF	POL	Krystyna Flis
31	MF	BIH	Una Rankić
32	GK	SUI	Lena Steiner
34	DF	SUI	Carla Christen

=== Out on loan ===
Note: Flags indicate national team as defined under FIFA eligibility rules; some limited exceptions apply. Players may hold more than one non-FIFA nationality.

No.	Pos.	Nation	Player
—	DF	SUI	Nora Raemy (at New Stars Basel until 31 December 2026)

=== Former players ===
For details of current and former players, see Category:FC Basel Frauen players.

- (Brazil) Ivana Fuso
- (New Zealand) Ria Percival
- (Greece) Eleni Markou
- (Algeria) Sonja Merazguia
- (Slovakia) Lucia Ondrusova
- (Hungary) Réka Szőcs

== Coaching staff ==
As of 29 July 2023

Position	Name
Head coach	(Germany) Kim Kulig
Assistant coach	(Germany) Francesco Continolo
Assistant coach	(Croatia) Kristina Šundov
Athletic trainer	(Switzerland) Colin Kohler
Athletic trainer	(Switzerland) Valentina Mühlebach
Goalkeeping coach	(Switzerland) Nadine Krattiger
Goalkeeping coach	(Switzerland) Stenia Michel
Sporting director	(Greece) Thodoris Karapetsas
Club doctor	(Germany) Cathrin Drewitz
Head of Physio	(Switzerland) Bianca Weisskopf
Physiotherapist	(Switzerland) Dominik Friebolin
Massage therapist	(Switzerland) Stefani Liebhardt
Materials manager	(Switzerland) Najim Hamdani
