= 2025–26 in Swiss football =

Football in Switzerland
- Season: 2025–26

Men's football
- Super League: Thun
- Challenge League: Vaduz
- Promotion League: Kriens
- Swiss Cup: St. Gallen

Women's football
- Swiss Super League: Servette Chênois
- Swiss Cup: Zürich

The following is a summary of the 2025–26 season of competitive football in Switzerland.

== National teams ==
=== Men's national team ===
==== Friendlies ====
27 March 2026	Switzerland	3–4	Germany	Basel, Switzerland
20:45 UTC+1	Ndoye 17'; Embolo 41'; Monteiro 79'	Report	Tah 26'; Gnabry 45+2'; Wirtz 61', 85'	Stadium: St. Jakob-Park; Attendance: 34,316; Referee: Chris Kavanagh (England)

31 March 2026	Norway	0–0	Switzerland	Oslo, Norway
18:00 UTC+2		Report		Stadium: Ullevaal Stadion; Attendance: 23,913; Referee: Jasper Vergoote (Belgium)

31 May 2026	Switzerland	4–1	Jordan	St. Gallen, Switzerland
15:00 UTC+2	Embolo 28' (pen.); Ndoye 33'; Xhaka 45+9' (pen.); Fassnacht 79'	Report	Al-Fakhouri 52'	Stadium: Kybunpark; Attendance: 13,380; Referee: Rohit Saggi (Norway)

6 June 2026	Australia	1–1	Switzerland	San Diego, California, United States
12:00 UTC−7	Ndoye 14'	Report	Yengi 56'	Stadium: Snapdragon Stadium; Attendance: 6,107; Referee: Katja Koroleva (United States)

==== FIFA World Cup Qualification ====
===== Group B =====
Pos	Team	Pld	W	D	L	GF	GA	GD	Pts	Qualification	(Switzerland national football team)	(Kosovo national football team)	(Slovenia national football team)	(Sweden men's national football team)
1	Switzerland	6	4	2	0	14	2	+12	14	Qualification for 2026 FIFA World Cup	—	4–0	3–0	4–1
2	Kosovo	6	3	2	1	6	5	+1	11	Advance to play-offs	1–1	—	0–0	2–0
3	Slovenia	6	0	4	2	3	8	−5	4		0–0	0–2	—	2–2
4	Sweden	6	0	2	4	4	12	−8	2	Advance to play-offs via Nations League	0–2	0–1	1–1	—

Source: FIFA, UEFA

==== FIFA World Cup ====
===== Group B =====
Pos	Team	Pld	W	D	L	GF	GA	GD	Pts	Position will qualify for:
1	Switzerland	2	1	1	0	5	2	+3	4	Knockout stage
2	Canada (H)	1	0	1	0	1	1	0	1 (Note: FIFA Ranking: Canada 30th, Qatar 56th.)	Knockout stage
3	Qatar	1	0	1	0	1	1	0	1	Possible knockout stage based on ranking
4	Bosnia and Herzegovina	2	0	1	1	2	5	−3	1	

Updated to match(es) played on June 18, 2026. Source: FIFA
Rules for classification: Group stage tiebreakers
(H) Hosts
Notes:

13 June 2026	Qatar	1–1	Switzerland	Santa Clara, California, United States
12:00 UTC−7	Khoukhi 90+4'	Report	Embolo 17' (pen.)	Stadium: Levi's Stadium; Attendance: 67,966; Referee: Saíd Martínez (Honduras)

18 June 2026	Switzerland	4–1	Bosnia and Herzegovina	Inglewood, California, United States
12:00 UTC−7	Manzambi 74', 90'; Vargas 84'; Xhaka 90+7' (pen.)	Report	Mahmić 90+3'	Stadium: SoFi Stadium; Referee: João Pinheiro (Portugal)

24 June 2026	Switzerland	v	Canada	Vancouver, Canada
12:00 UTC−7		Report		Stadium: BC Place

==== Nations League ====
26 September 2026	North Macedonia	v	Switzerland	Skopje, North Macedonia
20:45 UTC+2		Report		Stadium: Toše Proeski Arena

29 September 2026	Scotland	v	Switzerland	Glasgow, Scotland
19:45 UTC+1		Report		Stadium: Hampden Park

3 October 2026	Switzerland	v	Slovenia	Switzerland
20:45 UTC+2		Report

6 October 2026	Switzerland	v	North Macedonia	Switzerland
20:45 UTC+2		Report

13 November 2026	Slovenia	v	Switzerland	Ljubljana, Slovenia
20:45 UTC+1		Report		Stadium: Stožice Stadium

16 November 2026	Switzerland	v	Scotland	Switzerland
20:45 UTC+1		Report

=== Women's national team ===
==== Friendlies ====
26 June 2025	Switzerland	4–1	Czech Republic	Winterthur, Switzerland
18:00 UTC+0	Xhemaili 24'; Reuteler 42'; Vallotto 56'; Fölmli 89'	Report	Polcarova 27'	Stadium: Stadion Schützenwiese; Attendance: 7,778; Referee: Michalina Diakow (Poland)

24 October 2025	Switzerland	1–0	Canada	Lucerne, Switzerland
19:30 UTC+0	Pilgrim 12'	Report		Stadium: Swissporarena; Attendance: 10,025; Referee: Maika Vanderstichel (France)

28 October 2025	Scotland	3–4	Switzerland	Dunfermline, Scotland, United Kingdom
19:30 UTC+0	McGovern 35'; Reuteler 45+2' (o.g.); Weir 90+3'	Report	Schertenleib 24', 52'; Beney 41'; Vallotto 72'	Stadium: East End Park; Referee: Abigail Byrne (England)

28 November 2025	Switzerland	1–2	Belgium	Jerez, Spain
19:00 UTC+0	Lehmann 64'	Report	Deloose 36'; Tine De Caigny 72'	Stadium: Estadio Municipal de Chapín

2 December 2025	Wales	3–2	Switzerland	Jerez, Spain
12:00 UTC+0	Ingle 15'; Cain 35'; Woodham 46'	Report	Csillag 18'; Beney 71'	Stadium: Estadio Municipal de Chapín

==== Nations League ====
30 May 2026	France	4–0	Switzerland	Tomblaine, France
21:10 UTC+0	Mateo 11'; de Almeida 16'; Baltimore 19'; Geyoro 56'	Report		Stadium: Stade Marcel-Picot; Attendance: 12,359; Referee: Iuliana Demetrescu (Romania)

3 June 2026	Switzerland	0–1	Norway	Sion, Switzerland
20:00 UTC+0		Report	Bøe Risa 4'	Stadium: Stade de Tourbillon; Attendance: 6,888; Referee: Maria Sole Ferrieri Caputi (Italia)

==== UEFA Women's Euro ====
===== UEFA Women's Euro 2025 Group A =====
Pos	Team	Pld	W	D	L	GF	GA	GD	Pts	Qualification
1	Norway	3	3	0	0	8	5	+3	9	Advance to knockout stage
2	Switzerland (H)	3	1	1	1	4	3	+1	4 (Note: Tied on head-to-head result (Finland 1–1 Switzerland). Overall goal difference was used as the tiebreaker.)	Advance to knockout stage
3	Finland	3	1	1	1	3	3	0	4	
4	Iceland	3	0	0	3	3	7	−4	0	

Source: UEFA
Rules for classification: Group stage tiebreakers
(H) Hosts

===== Knockout Stage =====
18 July 2025	Spain	2–0	Switzerland	Bern, Switzerland
21:00 UTC+0	Athenea 66'; Pina 71'	Report		Stadium: Stadion Wankdorf; Attendance: 29,734; Referee: Maria Sole Ferrieri Caputi (Italy)

==== 2027 FIFA Women's World Cup qualification ====
===== 2027 FIFA Women's World Cup qualification – UEFA League B Group B2 =====
Pos	Team	Pld	W	D	L	GF	GA	GD	Pts	Promotion, qualification or relegation
1	Switzerland (P)	6	5	1	0	18	5	+13	16	Advance to play-offs and promotion to League A
2	Turkey	6	4	1	1	11	5	+6	13	Advance to play-offs
3	Northern Ireland	6	2	0	4	10	9	+1	6	Advance to play-offs
4	Malta (R)	6	0	0	6	4	24	−20	0	Relegation to League C

Source: UEFA
Rules for classification: Tiebreakers
(P) Promoted; (R) Relegated

== Club Football ==
=== Men ===
==== Credit Suisse Super League ====
Pos	Team	Pld	W	D	L	GF	GA	GD	Pts	Qualification or relegation (Note: Teams play each other three times (33 matches), before the league is split into two groups (the top six and the bottom six).)
1	Thun (C)	38	24	3	11	80	52	+28	75	Qualification for the Champions League second qualifying round
2	St. Gallen	38	20	10	8	72	47	+25	70	Qualification for the Europa League second qualifying round (Note: St. Gallen won the 2025–26 Swiss Cup and qualified for the Europa League second qualifying round as cup winners. Since they finished in the top three, the second Conference League berth was passed to the fourth-placed team, Sion.)
3	Lugano	38	19	10	9	59	42	+17	67	Qualification for the Conference League second qualifying round
4	Sion	38	16	15	7	63	40	+23	63	Qualification for the Conference League second qualifying round
5	Basel	38	16	8	14	55	58	−3	56	
6	Young Boys	38	15	10	13	80	69	+11	55	
7	Luzern	38	14	11	13	76	66	+10	53	
8	Servette	38	13	14	11	71	63	+8	53	
9	Lausanne-Sport	38	11	9	18	53	67	−14	42	
10	Zürich	38	11	5	22	49	72	−23	38	
11	Grasshopper (O)	38	8	9	21	48	74	−26	33	Qualification for the Relegation play-off
12	Winterthur (R)	38	5	8	25	44	100	−56	23	Relegation to 2026–27 Swiss Challenge League

Source: Brack Super League - Tabelle
Rules for classification: 1) Points; 2) Goal difference; 3) Goals scored; 4) Head-to-head goal difference; 5) Head-to-head goals scored 6) Away goals scored; 7) Draw.
(C) Champions; (O) Play-off winners; (R) Relegated

==== dieci Challenge League ====
Pos	Team	Pld	W	D	L	GF	GA	GD	Pts	Promotion, qualification or relegation
1	Vaduz (C, P)	36	25	6	5	75	41	+34	81	Promotion to Swiss Super League and qualification for the Conference League second qualifying round (Note: Vaduz qualified for the Conference League second qualifying round by winning the 2025–26 Liechtenstein Cup.)
2	Aarau	36	25	5	6	77	47	+30	80	Qualification for promotion play-off
3	Yverdon-Sport	36	20	7	9	75	48	+27	67	
4	Lausanne Ouchy	36	14	8	14	59	51	+8	50	
5	Xamax	36	14	7	15	55	56	−1	49	
6	Rapperswil-Jona	36	14	2	20	52	62	−10	44	
7	Wil	36	10	10	16	39	55	−16	40	
8	Étoile Carouge	36	10	10	16	46	54	−8	40	
9	Nyon	36	5	13	18	33	60	−27	28	
10	Bellinzona (R)	36	5	8	23	40	77	−37	23	Relegation to Swiss Promotion League

Source: Swiss Challenge League
Rules for classification: 1) Points; 2) Goal difference; 3) Goals scored; 4) Head-to-head goal difference; 5) Head-to-head goals scored 6) Away goals scored; 7) Draw.
(C) Champions; (P) Promoted; (R) Relegated

==== Hoval Promotion League ====
Pos	Team	Pld	W	D	L	GF	GA	GD	Pts	Promotion, qualification or relegation
1	Kriens (C, P)	32	23	4	5	96	42	+54	73	Promotion to Challenge League and qualification for Swiss Cup
2	Brühl	32	21	6	5	87	43	+44	69	Qualification for Swiss Cup
3	Biel-Bienne	32	18	7	7	72	43	+29	61	Qualification for Swiss Cup
4	Basel II	32	16	8	8	62	47	+15	56	Ineligible for promotion
5	Young Boys II	32	15	9	8	66	47	+19	54	Ineligible for promotion
6	Bavois	31	16	4	11	59	45	+14	52	Qualification for Swiss Cup
7	Schaffhausen	32	15	5	12	47	44	+3	50	Qualification for Swiss Cup
8	Cham	32	13	8	11	57	56	+1	47	Qualification for Swiss Cup
9	Bulle	32	13	6	13	64	61	+3	45	Qualification for Swiss Cup
10	Zürich II	32	11	8	13	55	56	−1	41	Ineligible for promotion
11	Grand-Saconnex	32	10	10	12	68	64	+4	40	
12	Breitenrain	32	10	8	14	44	47	−3	38	Ineligible for promotion
13	Luzern II	32	9	10	13	75	78	−3	37	
14	Lugano II	32	8	10	14	42	72	−30	34	Ineligible for promotion
15	Kreuzlingen	31	7	12	12	38	60	−22	33	
16	Paradiso	32	6	11	15	45	65	−20	29	
17	Lausanne-Sport II (R)	32	8	3	21	56	81	−25	27	Relegation to the 1. Liga Classic
18	Vevey-Sports (R)	32	1	5	26	28	110	−82	5 (Note: A 3-point deduction was set for Vevey-Sports due to non-compliance with the specific rules governing the league.)	Relegation to the 1. Liga Classic

Updated to match(es) played on 2 May 2026. Source: Erste Liga/Premiere Ligue/Prima Lega - Match center
Rules for classification: 1) Points; 2) Goal difference; 3) Goals scored; 4) Head-to-head goal difference; 5) Away goals scored; 6) Draw.
(C) Champions; (P) Promoted; (R) Relegated

=== Women ===
==== Axa Women's Super League ====
Pos	Team	Pld	W	D	L	GF	GA	GD	Pts	Qualification
1	Servette Chênois	17	15	2	0	42	4	+38	47	Advances to play-offs
2	BSC YB Frauen	17	10	3	4	29	13	+16	33	Advances to play-offs
3	GC Zürich	17	10	2	5	33	22	+11	32	Advances to play-offs
4	FC Basel 1893	17	9	5	3	22	13	+9	32	Advances to play-offs
5	FC Zürich	17	8	4	5	33	20	+13	28	Advances to play-offs
6	FC St. Gallen 1879	17	7	4	6	25	28	−3	25	Advances to play-offs
7	FC Rapperswil-Jona	17	3	6	8	17	28	−11	15	Advances to play-offs
8	FC Aarau	17	2	4	11	11	28	−17	10	Advances to play-offs
9	FC Luzern	17	2	4	11	21	47	−26	10	Participates in the qualifying round
10	FC Thun	17	1	2	14	15	45	−30	5	Participates in the qualifying round

Updated to match(es) played on 28 March 2026. Source: AWSL.ch
Rules for classification: Tiebreakers

== Swiss Clubs in Europe ==
=== UEFA Champions League ===
Play-off round
Team 1	Agg.	Team 2	1st leg	2nd leg
Champions Path
Basel (Switzerland)	1–3	(Denmark) Copenhagen	1–1	0–2

Second qualifying round
Team 1	Agg.	Team 2	1st leg	2nd leg
Champions Path
Viktoria Plzeň (Czech Republic)	3–2	(Switzerland) Servette	0–1	3–1

=== UEFA Europa League ===
Matchday 1
Home team	Score	Away team
SC Freiburg (Germany)	2–1	(Switzerland) Basel
Young Boys (Switzerland)	1–4	(Greece) Panathinaikos

Second qualifying round
Team 1	Agg.	Team 2	1st leg	2nd leg
Lugano (Switzerland)	0–1	(Romania) CFR Cluj	0–0	0–1 (a.e.t.)

=== UEFA Conference League ===
7 August 2025	Lausanne-Sport (Switzerland)	3–1	(Kazakhstan) Astana	Stade de la Tuilière, Lausanne
20:15	Roche 24'; Sène 43'; Ajdini 72'	Report	Bašić 90'	Attendance: 9,008; Referee: Łukasz Kuzma (Poland)

14 August 2025	Astana (Kazakhstan)	0–2	(Switzerland) Lausanne-Sport	Astana Arena, Astana
16:00 (19:00 UTC+5)		Report	Lekweiry 48'; Diakité 66'	Attendance: 27,985; Referee: Martin Matoša (Slovenia)

21 August 2025	Lausanne-Sport (Switzerland)	1–1	(Turkey) Beşiktaş	Stade de la Tuilière, Lausanne
20:15	Okoh 83'	Report	Rashica 45'	Attendance: 11,931; Referee: Sigurd Kringstad (Norway)

28 August 2025	Beşiktaş (Turkey)	0–1	(Switzerland) Lausanne-Sport	Beşiktaş Stadium, Istanbul
19:00 (20:00 UTC+3)		Report	Butler-Oyedeji 45+1'	Attendance: 27,031; Referee: Jakob Kehlet (Denmark)

28 August 2025	Beşiktaş (Turkey)	0–1	(Switzerland) Lausanne-Sport	Beşiktaş Stadium, Istanbul
19:00 (20:00 UTC+3)		Report	Butler-Oyedeji 45+1'	Attendance: 27,031; Referee: Jakob Kehlet (Denmark)

=== UEFA Women's Champions League ===
==== Bracket ====
Hosted by Apollon Ladies.

Semi-finals
27 August
(Cyprus) Apollon Ladies	0
(Switzerland) Young Boys	1
27 August
(Denmark) Fortuna Hjørring	2
(Scotland) Hibernian	1

Final
30 August
(Switzerland) Young Boys	0
(Denmark) Fortuna Hjørring	1
Third place
30 August
(Cyprus) Apollon Ladies	2
(Scotland) Hibernian	3

==== Semi-finals ====
27 August 2025	Apollon Ladies (Cyprus)	0–1	(Switzerland) Young Boys	Stelios Kyriakides Stadium, Paphos
16:00 (17:00 UTC+3)		Report	Waeber 71' (pen.)	Attendance: 250; Referee: Emilie Torkelsen (Norway)

==== Final ====
30 August 2025	Fortuna Hjørring (Denmark)	1–0	(Switzerland) Young Boys	Stelios Kyriakides Stadium, Paphos
20:30 (21:30 UTC+3)	Ogochukwu 58'	Report		Attendance: 40; Referee: Shona Shukrula (Netherlands)

Preceded by 2024–25	Seasons in Swiss football	Succeeded by 2026–27
