= 2025–26 Swiss Women's Super League =

Swiss Women's Super League
- Season: 2025–26
- Dates: 23 August 2025 – 19 May 2026
- Biggest away win: FC Luzern 2–8 GC Zürich; 24 September 2025
- All statistics correct as of 25 May 2026.

The 2025–26 season of the Super League, also known as AXA Women's Super League for sponsorship reasons, is the 56th edition of the Swiss top-tier women's football league.

BSC YB Frauen are the defending champions.

The 2025–26 season has started on 23 August 2025. The regular season is set to conclude on 22 March 2026, followed by the play-offs.

== Tiebreakers for league ranking ==
The following criteria are applied to determine the order of the teams in all rounds of the leagues:

1. The total number of points;
2. Goal difference in all league matches;
3. Number of goals scored in all league matches;
4. Goal difference in head-to-head matches;
5. Number of away goals scored in all league matches;

== Teams ==
Locations of teams in the 2024–25 Super League.

The home grounds of the ten teams participating in the 2025–26 season were confirmed on 2 August 2025.

Team	Home city	Home ground	Capacity	2024–25 finish
FC Aarau	Aarau	Sportanlage Schachen	1,500	5–8th
FC Basel 1893	Münchenstein	Leichtathletik-Stadion, St. Jakob	6,000	3rd
GC Zürich	Niederhasli	GC/Campus	1,300	2nd
FC Luzern	Luzern	Leichtathletik-Stadion Hubelmatt	7,000	5–8th
FC Rapperswil-Jona	Rapperswil-Jona	Stadion Grünfeld	2,700	9th
Servette Chênois	Chêne-Bourg	Stade des Trois-Chêne	4,000	5–8th
FC St. Gallen 1879	St. Gallen	Espenmoos	5,350	5–8th
Thun Berner-Oberland	Thun	Stadion Lachen	10,350	10th
BSC YB Frauen	Bern	Stadion Wankdorf	31,500	1st
FC Zürich	Zürich	Heerenschürli	1,120	3rd

== Regular season ==
=== League table ===
Pos	Team	Pld	W	D	L	GF	GA	GD	Pts	Qualification
1	Servette Chênois	17	15	2	0	42	4	+38	47	Advances to play-offs
2	BSC YB Frauen	17	10	3	4	29	13	+16	33	Advances to play-offs
3	GC Zürich	17	10	2	5	33	22	+11	32	Advances to play-offs
4	FC Basel 1893	17	9	5	3	22	13	+9	32	Advances to play-offs
5	FC Zürich	17	8	4	5	33	20	+13	28	Advances to play-offs
6	FC St. Gallen 1879	17	7	4	6	25	28	−3	25	Advances to play-offs
7	FC Rapperswil-Jona	17	3	6	8	17	28	−11	15	Advances to play-offs
8	FC Aarau	17	2	4	11	11	28	−17	10	Advances to play-offs
9	FC Luzern	17	2	4	11	21	47	−26	10	Participates in the qualifying round
10	FC Thun	17	1	2	14	15	45	−30	5	Participates in the qualifying round

Updated to match(es) played on 28 March 2026. Source: AWSL.ch
Rules for classification: Tiebreakers

=== Results ===
Home \ Away	AAR	BAS	GCZ	LUZ	RAP	SER	STG	THU	YBF	ZÜR
Aarau			0–1	1–1	1–1				0–2	
Basel	2–0			2–2				1–0	0–3	2–1
GC Zürich		0–1			2–0	2–3	1–1	2–0		2–0
Luzern			2–8		2–0	0–4	0–3			1–4
Rapperswil-Jona		2–0				0–0	3–5	3–1	0–3	
Servette Chênois	4–1	0–0					3–0	4–0		
St. Gallen	1–0	1–1						3–2	1–1	1–3
Thun	1–1			1–2					1–4	1–3
YB Frauen			1–2	2–1		0–3				
Zürich	3–2				5–1	0–1			0–0	

Updated to match(es) played on 1 November 2025. Source: Spielplan
Legend: Blue = home team win; Yellow = draw; Red = away team win.

== Play-offs ==
Both the winner of the play-offs and the runner-up secure spots in the 2026–27 UEFA Women's Champions League second qualifying round, in the Champions Path and League Path respectively.

=== Bracket ===
Quarter-finals
2026
Servette Chênois	2	4	6
Aarau	1	0	1
2026
GC Zürich	0	0	0
Zürich	2	0	2
2026
YB Frauen	1	4	5
FC Rapperswil-Jona	0	1	1
2026
Basel	0	0	0
St. Gallen (Note: Basel originally won the return leg 2-1 after extra-time, and came out victorious in the penalty shoot-out. However, after the match St. Gallen launched an appeal, and the Women's Football Directorate of the Swiss Football Association ruled that Basel had both exceeded the number of allowed substitutions as well as fielded a player who was not listed on the match sheet and was therefore not eligible to play. St. Gallen was awarded a 3-0 forfeit win in the return leg. Basel did not protest the decision and St. Gallen progressed to the semi-finals.)	1	3	4

Semi-finals
2026
Servette Chênois	4	2	6
Zürich	0	0	0
2026
YB Frauen	3	1	4
St. Gallen	1	0	1

Final
2026
Servette Chênois	2
YB Frauen	1

== Qualifying round ==
Pos	Team	Pld	W	D	L	GF	GA	GD	Pts	Promotion or relegation	TBD1	THU	YVE	TBD2
1	TBD	0	0	0	0	0	0	0	0	Promotion to 2026–27 Super League				
2	Thun Berner-Oberland	0	0	0	0	0	0	0	0	Promotion to 2026–27 Super League				
3	Yverdon Féminin	0	0	0	0	0	0	0	0	Relegation to 2026–27 Nationalliga B				
4	TBD	0	0	0	0	0	0	0	0	Relegation to 2026–27 Nationalliga B				

Updated to match(es) played on unknown. Source: AWSL.ch
Legend: Blue = home team win; Yellow = draw; Red = away team win.
Rules for classification: Tiebreakers

== Season statistics ==
=== Top goalscorers ===
As of 1 November 2025

Rank	Player	Team	Goals
1	(Sweden) Therese Simonsson	Servette FC Chênois	8
2	(Jamaica) Kayla McKenna	GC Zürich	7
3	(Romania) Cristina Carp	FC Luzern	5
4	(Switzerland) Sina Cavelti	FC St. Gallen	4
4	(Italy) Gloria Marinelli	Servette FC Chênois	4
4	(Switzerland) Naomi Mégroz	FC Zürich	4
4	(Switzerland) (Croatia) Martina Cavar	FC Zürich	4
4	(Switzerland) Luisa Blumenthal	FC Zürich	4
9	(Spain) Paula Serrano	Servette FC Chênois	3
9	(Jamaica) Paige Bailey-Gayle	FC Rapperswil-Jona	3

=== Clean sheets ===
Rank	Player	Club	Clean sheets
1	(Spain) Enith Salón	Servette FC Chênois	7
2	(Germany) (Switzerland) Selina Wölfle	FC Basel	4
3	(Denmark) Amanda Brunholt	BSC YB	3
4	(Switzerland) Isabel Rutishauser	GC Zürich	2
4	(United States) Lauren Kozal	GC Zürich	2
4	(Switzerland) Serena Proplesch	FC St. Gallen	2
7	(Switzerland) Laura Vogt	FC Rapperswil-Jona	1
7	(Switzerland) Laura Schneider	FC Luzern	1
7	(Switzerland) Lea van Weezenbeek	FC Rapperswil-Jona	1
7	(United States) Faith Hutchins	FC Zürich	1
7	(Liechtenstein) Jara Ackermann	BSC YB	1
