= 2010–11 Nationalliga A (women's football) =

The 2010–11 Nationalliga A was the 41st edition of the premier category of the Swiss women's football national championship, organized by the Swiss Football Association. It took place from 7 August 2010 to 28 May 2011. Ten teams took part in the competition, with FC Saint Gallen replacing relegated Rapperswil Jona. It marked a reform in the competition system, with the introduction of a second stage comprising an eight-teams round-robin championship play-off and a promotion confronting the first stage's two bottom teams and the Nationalliga B's two top teams.

YB Frauen won its tenth title ten years later with an 18–6–1 record, qualifying for the 2011-12 Champions League. FC Yverdon Féminin was the runner-up tied at points with Basel, while defending champion FC Zürich was fourth. 2007 champion FFC Zuchwil and Rot-Schwarz Thun were relegated. YB Frauen's Veronica Maglia was the championship's top scorer with 16 goals.

== First stage ==
#	Team	Pld	W	D	L	GF	GA	Pt
1	YB Frauen	18	13	4	1	59	19	43
2	Yverdon	18	12	5	1	51	17	41
3	Grasshopper	18	12	0	6	36	15	36
4	Zürich	18	9	4	5	49	19	31
5	Basel	18	7	7	4	39	27	28
6	Kriens	18	5	7	6	27	25	22
7	Staad	18	6	1	11	19	39	19
8	Saint Gallen	18	4	2	12	22	44	14
9	Zuchwil	18	3	5	10	14	41	14
10	Rot-Schwarz Thun	18	1	1	16	11	81	4

	YBF	YVE	GRA	ZUR	BAS	KRI	STA	SGA	ZUC	RST
YB Frauen		2–1	3–1	2–1	2–2	2–1	4–2	8–0	6–0	5–0
Yverdon	2–2		2–0	4–1	6–2	2–1	4–0	4–1	4–2	8–0
Grasshopper	3–0	–		1–3	2–0	2–0	4–0	3–1	0–1	4–1
Zürich	1–3	1–1	1–2		2–0	2–2	5–0	3–0	1–2	12–0
Basel	2–2	1–1	0–2	2–2		1–1	1–0	2–0	3–3	8–0
Kriens	1–1	2–2	0–1	0–0	0–3		2–2	2–1	1–1	4–1
Staad	0–1	0–2	1–0	0–4	1–3	2–3		1–4	2–0	3–0
Saint Gallen	2–4	0–2	0–4	0–4	1–1	1–2	0–1		2–0	3–2
Zuchwil	0–6	1–1	0–3	0–4	1–3	1–0	1–2	0–0		0–2
Rot-Schwarz Thun	0–6	1–3	0–4	0–2	1–5	0–5	1–2	1–6	1–1	

== Final stage ==
=== Championship round ===
#	Team	Pld	W	D	L	GF	GA	Pt	PS	Q / R
1	YB Frauen	7	5	2	0	17	4	39 (22+17)	2	Qualified for the 2011-12 Champions League
2	Yverdon	7	3	0	4	12	10	30 (21+9)	2	
3	Basel	7	5	1	1	24	10	30 (14+16)	6	
4	Zürich	7	4	1	2	14	8	29 (16+13)	3	
5	Grasshopper	7	1	2	4	6	18	23 (18+5)	3	
6	Kriens	7	2	2	3	8	12	19 (11+8)	1	
7	Staad	7	1	1	5	3	12	14 (10+4)		
8	Saint Gallen	7	2	1	4	8	17	14 (7+7)	3	

=== Promotion ===
#	Team	Pld	W	D	L	GF	GA	Pt	Q / R
1	Schwyz	6	3	2	1	10	9	11	
2	Schlieren	6	2	3	1	13	11	9	
3	Zuchwil	6	1	4	1	8	8	7	Relegated to Nationalliga B
4	Rot-Schwarz Thun	6	0	3	3	6	9	3	Relegated to Nationalliga B

	SCW	SCL	ZUC	RST
Schwyz		3–3	1–1	2–1
Schlieren	0–2		2–2	4–3
Zuchwil	4–1	0–3		1–1
Rot-Schwarz Thun	0–1	1–1	0–0	

== Top scorers ==
Rank	Player	Team	Goals
1	(Switzerland) Veronica Maglia	YB Frauen	16
2	(Switzerland) Maeva Sarrasin	Yverdon	13
3	(Switzerland) Chantal Fimian	Grasshopper	12
+	(Switzerland) Annina Spahr	YB Frauen	12
+	(Switzerland) Petra Tamagni	Yverdon	12
6	(Switzerland) Konstoula Frangouli	Basel	11
7	(Switzerland) Romana Lendenmann	Zürich	7
+	(Switzerland) Sandy Mändly	YB Frauen	7
+	(Switzerland) Michelle Probst	Zuchwil	7
+	(Switzerland) Selina Zumbühl	Zürich	7
+	(Switzerland) Manuela Zürcher	Zürich	7
