= 2024–25 in Swiss football =

Football in Switzerland
- Season: 2024–25

The following is a summary of the 2024–25 season of competitive football in Switzerland.

== National teams ==
=== Men's national team ===
==== Friendlies ====
21 March	Northern Ireland	1–1	Switzerland	Belfast, Northern Ireland
19:45 UTC+0		Report		Stadium: Windsor Park

25 March	Switzerland	v	Luxembourg	St. Gallen, Switzerland
20:45 UTC+1		Report		Stadium: Kybunpark

7 June	Mexico	v	Switzerland	Salt Lake City, United States
				Stadium: Rice–Eccles Stadium

10 June	United States	v	Switzerland	Nashville, United States
				Stadium: Geodis Park

==== UEFA Euro 2024 ====
===== Knockout stage =====
6 July 2024 QF	England	1–1 (a.e.t.) (5–3 p)	Switzerland	Düsseldorf, Germany
18:00		Report		Stadium: Merkur Spiel-Arena

==== 2024–25 UEFA Nations League ====
===== 2024–25 UEFA Nations League A Group 4 =====
Pos	Team	Pld	W	D	L	GF	GA	GD	Pts	Qualification or relegation	(Spain)	(Denmark)	(Serbia)	(Switzerland)
1	Spain	6	5	1	0	13	4	+9	16	Advance to quarter-finals	—	1–0	3–0	3–2
2	Denmark	6	2	2	2	7	5	+2	8	Advance to quarter-finals	1–2	—	2–0	2–0
3	Serbia (O)	6	1	3	2	3	6	−3	6	Qualification for relegation play-offs	0–0	0–0	—	2–0
4	Switzerland (R)	6	0	2	4	6	14	−8	2	Relegation to League B	1–4	2–2	1–1	—

Source: UEFA
Rules for classification: Tiebreakers
(O) Play-off winners; (R) Relegated

5 September 2024	Denmark	2–0	Switzerland	Copenhagen, Denmark
20:45 UTC+2		Report		Stadium: Parken Stadium

8 September 2024	Switzerland	1–4	Spain	Bern, Switzerland
20:45 UTC+2		Report		Stadium: Stadion Wankdorf

12 October 2024	Serbia	2–0	Switzerland	Belgrade, Serbia
20:45 UTC+2		Report		Stadium: Partizan Stadium

15 October 2024	Switzerland	2–2	Denmark	Thun, Switzerland
20:45 UTC+2		Report		Stadium: Stockhorn Arena

15 November 2024	Switzerland	1–1	Serbia	Switzerland
20:45 UTC+1		Report		Stadium: TBD

18 November 2024	Spain	3–2	Switzerland	Burgos, Spain
20:45 UTC+1		Report		Stadium: Estadio El Plantío

=== Women's national team ===
==== Friendlies ====
25 October 2024	Switzerland	1–1	Australia	Zurich
20:00 UTC+2		Source		Stadium: Stadion Letzigrund

29 October 2024	Switzerland	2–1	France	Geneva
21:00				Stadium: Stade de Genève

29 November 2024	Switzerland	0–6	Germany	Zürich
20:00				Stadium: Letzigrund

3 December 2024	England	1–0	Switzerland	Sheffield, England
19:45				Stadium: Bramall Lane

==== UEFA Women's Euro 2025 qualifying League B ====
Pos	Team	Pld	W	D	L	GF	GA	GD	Pts	Qualification	(Switzerland)	(Turkey)	(Hungary)	(Azerbaijan)
1	Switzerland (H, P)	6	5	0	1	14	3	+11	15	Qualify for final tournament as host and promotion to League A	—	3–1	2–1	3–0
2	Turkey	6	3	0	3	8	8	0	9	Advance to play-offs	0–2	—	2–1	1–0
3	Hungary	6	2	1	3	10	9	+1	7	Advance to play-offs	1–0	1–4	—	1–1
4	Azerbaijan (R)	6	1	1	4	2	14	−12	4	Relegation to League C and advance to play-offs (Note: Since Switzerland (who qualified as hosts) finished in the top three places in their group, the best-ranked fourth-placed team qualified for the play-offs.)	0–4	1–0	0–5	—

Source: UEFA
Rules for classification: Tiebreakers
(H) Hosts of final tournament; (P) Promoted; (R) Relegated
Notes:

12 July 2024	Turkey	0–2	Switzerland	İzmit
TBC		Report		Stadium: Kocaeli Stadium

16 July 2024	Switzerland	3–0	Azerbaijan	Lausanne
19:00		Report		Stadium: Stade Olympique de la Pontaise

==== 2025 UEFA Women's Nations League ====
===== 2025 UEFA Women's Nations League A Group A2 =====
Pos	Team	Pld	W	D	L	GF	GA	GD	Pts	Qualification or relegation	(France)	(Norway)	(Iceland)	(Switzerland)
1	France	6	6	0	0	14	2	+12	18	Qualification for Nations League Finals	—	1–0	3–2	4–0
2	Norway	6	2	2	2	4	5	−1	8		0–2	—	1–1	2–1
3	Iceland (O)	6	0	4	2	6	9	−3	4	Qualification for relegation play-offs	0–2	0–0	—	3–3
4	Switzerland (R)	6	0	2	4	4	12	−8	2	Relegation to League B	0–2	0–1	0–0	—

Source: UEFA
Rules for classification: Tiebreakers
(O) Play-off winners; (R) Relegated

19 February 2025	Switzerland	v	Iceland

26 February 2025	Norway	v	Switzerland

2 April 2025	Switzerland	v	France

8 April 2025	Iceland	v	Switzerland

26 May 2025	France	v	Switzerland

3 June 2025	Switzerland	v	Norway

== Club Football ==
=== Men ===
==== Credit Suisse Super League ====
Pos	Team	Pld	W	D	L	GF	GA	GD	Pts	Qualification or relegation (Note: Teams play each other three times (33 matches), before the league is split into two groups (the top six and the bottom six).)
1	Basel (C)	38	22	7	9	91	43	+48	73	Qualification for the Champions League play-off round
2	Servette	38	17	12	9	64	55	+9	63	Qualification for the Champions League second qualifying round
3	Young Boys	38	17	10	11	60	49	+11	61	Qualification for the Europa League play-off round (Note: The 2024–25 Swiss Cup winner (Basel) qualifies for the Europa League play-off round. Since the cup winner finished in the top three, the remaining European berths were passed down to the next highest qualifying teams.)
4	Lugano	38	15	9	14	55	58	−3	54	Qualification for the Europa League second qualifying round
5	Lausanne-Sport	38	14	11	13	62	54	+8	53	Qualification for the Conference League second qualifying round
6	Luzern	38	14	10	14	66	64	+2	52	
7	Zürich	38	15	8	15	56	57	−1	53	
8	St. Gallen	38	13	13	12	52	53	−1	52	
9	Sion	38	11	11	16	47	57	−10	44	
10	Winterthur	38	11	7	20	43	68	−25	40	
11	Grasshopper (O)	38	9	12	17	43	53	−10	39	Qualification for the Relegation play-off
12	Yverdon-Sport (R)	38	9	12	17	40	68	−28	39	Relegation to Swiss Challenge League

Source: Swiss Super League
Rules for classification: 1) Points; 2) Goal difference; 3) Goals scored; 4) Head-to-head goal difference; 5) Head-to-head goals scored 6) Away goals scored; 7) Draw.
(C) Champions; (O) Play-off winners; (R) Relegated

==== dieci Challenge League ====
Pos	Team	Pld	W	D	L	GF	GA	GD	Pts	Promotion, qualification or relegation
1	Thun (C, P)	36	21	9	6	70	39	+31	72	Promotion to Swiss Super League
2	Aarau (Q)	36	16	13	7	63	45	+18	61	Qualification for promotion play-off
3	Étoile Carouge	36	15	9	12	57	46	+11	54	
4	Lausanne Ouchy	36	14	11	11	54	43	+11	53	
5	Wil	36	14	11	11	60	55	+5	53	
6	Vaduz	36	13	12	11	48	49	−1	51	Qualification for Conference League second qualifying round (Note: Vaduz qualified for the Conference League second qualifying round by winning the 2024–25 Liechtenstein Cup.)
7	Bellinzona (Note: Bellinzona were deducted 3 points on 16 December 2024 (confirmed on 22 January 2025), for failing to report social contribution payments. This decision was partially overturned by CAS on 25 April 2025 (Bellinzona are still fined SFr 30,000).)	36	11	11	14	47	60	−13	44	
8	Xamax	36	12	5	19	57	65	−8	41	
9	Nyon	36	10	6	20	44	69	−25	36	
10	Schaffhausen (R)	36	7	7	22	40	69	−29	25 (Note: Schaffhausen were deducted 3 points on 26 February 2025 (confirmed on 25 March 2025), for failing to report social contribution payments.)	Relegation to Swiss Promotion League

Source: Swiss Challenge League
Rules for classification: 1) Points; 2) Goal difference; 3) Goals scored; 4) Head-to-head goal difference; 5) Head-to-head goals scored 6) Away goals scored; 7) Draw.
(C) Champions; (P) Promoted; (Q) Qualified for the phase indicated; (R) Relegated

==== Hoval Promotion League ====
Pos	Team	Pld	W	D	L	GF	GA	GD	Pts	Promotion, qualification or relegation
1	Rapperswil-Jona (C, P)	34	21	6	7	72	35	+37	69	Promotion to Swiss Challenge League and qualification for Swiss Cup
2	Kriens (Q)	34	20	8	6	72	45	+27	68	Qualification for Swiss Cup
3	Biel-Bienne (Q)	34	20	5	9	65	44	+21	65	Qualification for Swiss Cup
4	Basel U21	34	15	11	8	59	47	+12	56	
5	Breitenrain (Q)	34	15	8	11	61	64	−3	53	Qualification for Swiss Cup
6	Cham (Q)	34	11	11	12	48	51	−3	44	Qualification for Swiss Cup
7	Grand-Saconnex (Q)	34	9	15	10	67	60	+7	42	Qualification for Swiss Cup
8	Vevey-Sports	34	11	12	11	60	70	−10	42 (Note: Vevey-Sports were deducted 3 points.)	
9	Paradiso	34	11	9	14	31	41	−10	42	
10	Bulle	34	10	11	13	44	49	−5	41	
11	Bavois	34	10	10	14	41	46	−5	40	
12	Young Boys U21	34	11	7	16	40	47	−7	40	
13	Bruhl	34	11	7	16	54	72	−18	40	
14	Luzern U21	34	9	12	13	62	65	−3	39	
15	Lugano U21	34	10	9	15	46	51	−5	39	
16	Zürich U21	34	11	6	17	51	59	−8	39	
17	Baden (R)	34	11	6	17	34	52	−18	39	Relegation to the 1. Liga Classic
18	Delémont (R)	34	10	7	17	43	52	−9	37	Relegation to the 1. Liga Classic

Source: Erste Liga - Match center
Rules for classification: 1) Points; 2) Goal difference; 3) Goals scored; 4) Head-to-head goal difference; 5) Away goals scored; 6) Draw.
(C) Champions; (P) Promoted; (Q) Qualified for the phase indicated; (R) Relegated

=== Women ===
==== Axa Women's Super League ====
Pos	Team	Pld	W	D	L	GF	GA	GD	Pts	Qualification
1	BSC YB Frauen	18	12	3	3	46	18	+28	39	Advances to play-offs
2	FC Basel 1893	18	12	3	3	42	14	+28	39	Advances to play-offs
3	Servette Chênois	18	12	2	4	37	10	+27	38	Advances to play-offs
4	FC St. Gallen 1879	18	9	5	4	33	12	+21	32	Advances to play-offs
5	FC Zürich	18	10	2	6	29	25	+4	32	Advances to play-offs
6	GC Zürich	18	8	4	6	40	24	+16	28	Advances to play-offs
7	FC Aarau	18	8	2	8	24	28	−4	26	Advances to play-offs
8	FC Luzern	18	2	4	12	18	45	−27	10	Advances to play-offs
9	Thun Berner-Oberland	18	2	2	14	16	61	−45	8	Participates in the qualifying round
10	FC Rapperswil-Jona	18	1	1	16	6	54	−48	4	Participates in the qualifying round

Source: AWSL.ch
Rules for classification: Tiebreakers

== Swiss Clubs in Europe ==
=== UEFA Champions League ===
==== Qualifying rounds ====
===== Second qualifying round =====
Team 1	Agg.	Team 2	1st leg	2nd leg
Lugano (Switzerland)	4–6	(Turkey) Fenerbahçe	3–4	1–2

===== Play-off round =====
Team 1	Agg.	Team 2	1st leg	2nd leg
Young Boys (Switzerland)	4–2	(Turkey) Galatasaray	3–2	1–0

==== League phase ====
===== Young Boys =====
Pos	Team	Pld	W	D	L	GF	GA	GD	Pts
32	(German Football Association) RB Leipzig	8	1	0	7	8	15	−7	3
33	(Royal Spanish Football Federation) Girona	8	1	0	7	5	13	−8	3
34	(Austrian Football Association) Red Bull Salzburg	8	1	0	7	5	27	−22	3
35	(Slovak Football Association) Slovan Bratislava	8	0	0	8	7	27	−20	0
36	(Swiss Football Association) Young Boys	8	0	0	8	3	24	−21	0

Source: UEFA
Rules for classification: League phase tiebreakers

Home team	Score	Away team
Young Boys (Switzerland)	0–3	(England) Aston Villa
Barcelona (Spain)	5–0	(Switzerland) Young Boys
Young Boys (Switzerland)	0–1	(Italy) Inter Milan
Shakhtar Donetsk (Ukraine)	2–1	(Switzerland) Young Boys
Young Boys (Switzerland)	1–6	(Italy) Atalanta
VfB Stuttgart (Germany)	5–1	(Switzerland) Young Boys
Celtic (Scotland)	1–0	(Switzerland) Young Boys
Young Boys (Switzerland)	0–1	(Serbia) Red Star Belgrade

=== UEFA Europa League ===
==== Qualifying rounds ====
===== Third qualifying round =====
Team 1	Agg.	Team 2	1st leg	2nd leg
Partizan (Serbia)	2–3	(Switzerland) Lugano	0–1	2–2 (a.e.t.)
Braga (Portugal)	2–1	(Switzerland) Servette	0–0	2–1

===== Play-off round =====
Team 1	Agg.	Team 2	1st leg	2nd leg
Lugano (Switzerland)	4–8	(Turkey) Beşiktaş	3–3	1–5

=== UEFA Conference League ===
==== Qualifying phase and play-off round ====
===== Second qualifying round =====
Team 1	Agg.	Team 2	1st leg	2nd leg
St. Gallen (Switzerland)	5–1	(Kazakhstan) Tobol	4–1	1–0
Zürich (Switzerland)	3–0	(Republic of Ireland) Shelbourne	3–0	0–0

===== Third qualifying round =====
Team 1	Agg.	Team 2	1st leg	2nd leg
Zürich (Switzerland)	0–5	(Portugal) Vitória de Guimarães	0–3	0–2
St. Gallen (Switzerland)	4–3	(Poland) Śląsk Wrocław	2–0	2–3

===== Play-off round =====
Team 1	Agg.	Team 2	1st leg	2nd leg
St. Gallen (Switzerland)	1–1 (5–4 p)	(Turkey) Trabzonspor	0–0	1–1
Chelsea (England)	3–2	(Switzerland) Servette	2–0	1–2

==== League phase ====
===== St. Gallen =====
Pos	Team	Pld	W	D	L	GF	GA	GD	Pts
27	(Football Association of the Czech Republic) Mladá Boleslav	6	2	0	4	7	10	−3	6
28	(Kazakhstan Football Federation) Astana	6	1	2	3	4	8	−4	5
29	(Swiss Football Association) St. Gallen	6	1	2	3	10	18	−8	5
30	(Football Association of Finland) HJK	6	1	1	4	3	9	−6	4
31	(Football Federation of Armenia) Noah	6	1	1	4	6	16	−10	4

Source: UEFA
Rules for classification: League phase tiebreakers

Home team	Score	Away team
Cercle Brugge (Belgium)	6–2	(Switzerland) St. Gallen
St. Gallen (Switzerland)	2–4	(Italy) Fiorentina
Larne (Northern Ireland)	1–2	(Switzerland) St. Gallen
St. Gallen (Switzerland)	2–2	(Serbia) TSC
St. Gallen (Switzerland)	1–4	(Portugal) Vitória de Guimarães
1. FC Heidenheim (Germany)	1–1	(Switzerland) St. Gallen

===== Lugano =====
Pos	Team	Pld	W	D	L	GF	GA	GD	Pts	Qualification
4	(Austrian Football Association) Rapid Wien	6	4	1	1	11	5	+6	13	Advance to round of 16 (seeded)
5	(Swedish Football Association) Djurgårdens IF	6	4	1	1	11	7	+4	13 (Note: Away goals scored: Djurgårdens IF 5, Lugano 4.)	Advance to round of 16 (seeded)
6	(Swiss Football Association) Lugano	6	4	1	1	11	7	+4	13	Advance to round of 16 (seeded)
7	(Polish Football Association) Legia Warsaw	6	4	0	2	13	5	+8	12	Advance to round of 16 (seeded)
8	(Royal Belgian Football Association) Cercle Brugge	6	3	2	1	14	7	+7	11	Advance to round of 16 (seeded)

Source: UEFA
Rules for classification: League phase tiebreakers
Notes:

Home team	Score	Away team
Lugano (Switzerland)	3–0	(Finland) HJK
Mladá Boleslav (Czech Republic)	0–1	(Switzerland) Lugano
TSC (Serbia)	4–1	(Switzerland) Lugano
Lugano (Switzerland)	2–0	(Belgium) Gent
Legia Warsaw (Poland)	1–2	(Switzerland) Lugano
Lugano (Switzerland)	2–2	(Cyprus) Pafos

==== Knockout phase ====
===== Round of 16 =====
Team 1	Agg.	Team 2	1st leg	2nd leg
Celje (Slovenia)	5–5 (3–1 p)	(Switzerland) Lugano	1–0	4–5 (a.e.t.)

=== UEFA Women's Champions League ===
==== Qualifying rounds ====
===== Round 1 =====
====== Semi-finals ======
Team 1	Score	Team 2
Servette (Switzerland)	1–0	(Poland) Pogoń Szczecin

====== Final ======
Team 1	Score	Team 2
PAOK (Greece)	0–2	(Switzerland) Servette

===== Round 2 =====
Team 1	Agg.	Team 2	1st leg	2nd leg
Roma (Italy)	10–3	(Switzerland) Servette	3–1	7–2

=== UEFA Youth League ===
==== UEFA Champions League Path ====
===== Young Boys =====
Pos	Team	Pld	W	D	L	GF	GA	GD	Pts
28	(Football Association of Serbia) Red Star Belgrade	6	1	2	3	7	11	−4	5 (Note: Away goals scored: Milan 5; Red Star Belgrade 4.)
29	(Royal Dutch Football Association) Feyenoord	6	1	1	4	7	14	−7	4
30	(Swiss Football Association) Young Boys	6	1	0	5	11	17	−6	3
31	(Royal Belgian Football Association) Club Brugge	6	0	3	3	5	11	−6	3
32	(German Football Association) RB Leipzig	6	1	0	5	10	18	−8	3

Source: UEFA
Rules for classification: League phase tiebreakers
Notes:

Home team	Score	Away team
Young Boys (Switzerland)	2–1	(England) Aston Villa
Barcelona (Spain)	4–2	(Switzerland) Young Boys
Young Boys (Switzerland)	2–3	(Italy) Inter Milan
Shakhtar Donetsk (Ukraine)	3–2	(Switzerland) Young Boys
Young Boys (Switzerland)	2–4	(Italy) Atalanta
VfB Stuttgart (Germany)	2–1	(Switzerland) Young Boys

==== Domestic Champions Path ====
===== Second round =====
Team 1	Agg.	Team 2	1st leg	2nd leg
Basel (Switzerland)	8–1	(Azerbaijan) Sabah	6–0	2–1

===== Third round =====
Team 1	Agg.	Team 2	1st leg	2nd leg
Basel (Switzerland)	1–5	(Austria) Rapid Wien	1–2	0–3

Preceded by 2023–24	Seasons in Swiss football	Succeeded by 2025–26
