= Athanasia Moraitou =

Greek footballer

Personal information
- Full name: Athanasia Moraitou
- Date of birth: 2 April 1997 (age 29)
- Place of birth: Waiblingen, Germany
- Height: 1.70 m (5 ft 7 in)
- Position: Midfielder

Team information
- Current team: FC Luzern

Youth career
- 2011–2012: FSV Waiblingen
- 2012–2014: VfL Sindelfingen

College career
Years	Team	Apps	(Gls)
2019–2020	South Alabama Jaguars	24	(2)

Senior career*
Years	Team	Apps	(Gls)
2013–2017	VfL Sindelfingen	66	(14)
2017–2019	Cloppenburg	30	(1)
2019	VfL Sindelfingen	10	(2)
2021–2023	SV Meppen	50	(0)
2023–2026	Union Berlin	51	(8)
2026–	Luzern	11	(0)

International career^{‡}
2013	Germany U16	2	(1)
2013	Greece U17	6	(1)
2014–2016	Greece U19	9	(2)
2014–	Greece	71	(2)
- * Club domestic league appearances and goals as of 21 November 2026 ‡ National team caps and goals as of 14 April 2026

Athanasia Moraitou (born 2 April 1997) is a footballer who plays as a midfielder for Luzern in the Swiss Super League. Born in Germany, she represents Greece at international level.

== Career ==
Moraitou has been capped for the Greece national team, appearing for the team during the 2019 FIFA Women's World Cup qualifying cycle.

== Honours ==
=== Club ===
South Alabama Jaguars

- Sun Belt Conference Women's Soccer Tournament (2): 2019, 2020

Meppen

- 2. Frauen-Bundesliga (1): 2021/22

Union Berlin

- 2. Frauen-Bundesliga (1): 2024/25
- Regionalliga Nordost (1): 2023/24

=== Individual ===
- Sun Belt Newcomer of the Year: 2019
- All-Sun Belt first team: 2019

== Career statistics ==
=== College ===
Team	Season	NCAA Regular Season			Sun Belt Tournament		NCAA Tournament		Total	
Team	Season	Division	Apps	Goals	Apps	Goals	Apps	Goals	Apps	Goals
South Alabama Jaguars	2019	Div. I	16	1	0	0	1	0	17	1
South Alabama Jaguars	2020	Div. I	7	1	0	0	0	0	7	1
South Alabama Jaguars	Total		23	2	0	0	1	0	24	2

=== Club ===
As of 14 November 2026

Appearances and goals by club, season and competition
Club	Season	League			National Cup		Total	
Club	Season	Division	Apps	Goals	Apps	Goals	Apps	Goals
Sindelfingen	2013–14	Bundesliga	8	0	0	0	8	0
Sindelfingen	2014–15	2. Bundesliga	15	4	1	0	16	4
Sindelfingen	2015–16	2. Bundesliga	21	3	2	1	23	4
Sindelfingen	2016–17	2. Bundesliga	22	7	2	0	24	7
Sindelfingen	Total		66	14	5	1	71	15
Cloppenburg	2017–18	2. Bundesliga	21	1	3	1	24	2
Cloppenburg	2018–19	2. Bundesliga	9	0	0	0	9	0
Cloppenburg	Total		30	1	3	1	33	2
Sindelfingen	2018–19	Regionalliga	10	2	0	0	10	2
Meppen	2020–21	Bundesliga	7	0	1	0	8	0
Meppen	2021–22	2. Bundesliga	24	0	2	0	26	0
Meppen	2022–23	Bundesliga	19	0	2	0	21	0
Meppen	Total		50	0	5	0	55	0
Union Berlin	2023–24	Regionalliga	18	7	2	0	20	7
Union Berlin	2024–25	2. Bundesliga	26	1	3	1	29	2
Union Berlin	2025–26	Bundesliga	7	0	2	0	9	0
Union Berlin	Total		51	8	7	1	58	9
Luzern	2026–27	Swiss Super League	11	0	1	0	12	0
Career total			218	26	20	3	239	28

== International goals ==
No.	Date	Venue	Opponent	Score	Result	Competition
1.	8 November 2018	Georgios Makris Stadium, Prosotsani, Greece	Slovakia	1–0	1–1	Friendly
2.	14 April 2026	Tórsvøllur, Tórshavn, Faroe Islands	Faroe Islands	1–0	3–2	2027 FIFA Women's World Cup qualification
