= 2026–27 Swiss Cup =

Tournament details
- Country: Switzerland
- Date: 14 August 2026 – 6 June 2027
- Teams: 64

Tournament statistics
- Matches played: 48
- Goals scored: 224 (4.67 per match)

The 2026–27 Swiss Cup is the 102nd edition of the Swiss Cup, the premier annual association football cup for clubs in Switzerland. The competition began on 14 August 2026 with the first round and is scheduled to conclude with the final on 6 June 2027. A total of 64 teams are competing. St. Gallen are the defending champions, having defeated Stade Lausanne Ouchy 3–0 in the 2026 final.

Times up to 24 October 2026 and from 28 March 2027 are CEST (UTC+2). Times from 25 October 2026 to 27 March 2027 are CET (UTC+1).

== Overview ==
=== Participating teams ===
64 teams participate in the Swiss Cup. They come from across the three levels of the Swiss football pyramid:

- The 21 eligible members of the Swiss Football League are automatically entered
  - Twelve from the Super League
  - Nine teams from the Challenge League (Note: Liechtenstein club and Challenge League member FC Vaduz is not eligible to participate in the Swiss Cup. This spot is awarded to the Promotion League)
- 17 teams can qualify from the First League (Promotion League and 1. Liga) (Note: U21 squads of SFL teams are not eligible to participate in the Swiss Cup.)
  - Seven top ranked eligible teams of the 2025–26 Swiss Promotion League
  - Ten 1. Liga Classic teams qualified through the qualifying tournament
- 25 teams can qualify from the Amateur League
  - Nine 2. Liga Interregional teams qualified through the qualifying tournament
  - 16 teams from the 13 regional football associations (regional associations of Bern-Jura, Zürich and Eastern Switzerland (Note: Includes the Cantons of St. Gallen, Thurgau, Appenzell Innerrhoden, Appenzell Ausserrhoden, Glarus, and Grisons.) have two participants)
- Final spot is awarded to the winner of the Suva Fairplay Trophy, awarded to the fairest football club of the last season

Super League; 11 teams	Challenge League; 10 teams	Promotion League; 9 teams	1. Liga; 8 teams	2. Liga Interregional; 10 teams	2. Liga; 14 teams	3. Liga/4. Liga; 2 teams
BSC Young Boys; FC Basel 1893; FC Sion; FC Thun; FC St. Gallen 1879; FC Zürich; Grasshopper Club Zürich; FC Lausanne-Sport; Servette FC; FC Lugano; FC Luzern	FC Aarau; FC Winterthur; FC Wil 1900; FC Rapperswil-Jona; Étoile Carouge FC; FC Stade-Lausanne-Ouchy; FC Stade Nyonnais; Yverdon Sport FC; Neuchâtel Xamax FCS; SC Kriens	FC Biel-Bienne; FC Bulle; SC Brühl SG; FC Schaffhausen; SC YF Juventus; FC Bavois; FC Amical Saint-Prex; AC Bellinzona; SC Cham	FC Münsingen; FC Langenthal; FC Courtételle; FC Tuggen; FC Thalwil; Meyrin FC; SC Buochs; AC Taverne	BSC Old Boys; FC Liestal; FC Köniz; FC Grenchen 15; Zürich City SC; FC Rorschach-Goldach 17; FC Rotkreuz; US Terre Sainte; FC Collex-Bossy; Pully Football	FC Interlaken; FC Courrendlin-Courroux; FC Aesch; FC Kerzers; FC Saxon-Sports; FC Mutschellen; FC Winkeln SG; FC Rebstein; FC Regensdorf; FC Wiesendangen; CS Italien GE; FC Kosova Neuchâtel; FC Genolier-Begnins; FC Brunnen	SV Kaufdorf; Vedeggio Calcio

=== Schedule ===
The following table shows the scheduling of the individual rounds of the competitions:

Round	Match date	Draw date
Round 1 (round of 64)	14–16 August 2026	1 July 2026
Round 2 (round of 32)	16–18 October 2026	16 August 2026
Round 3 (round of 16)	1–3 December 2026	18 October 2026
Round 4 (quarter-finals)	2–4 February 2027	3 December 2026
Round 5 (semi-finals)	1–2 May 2027	4 February 2027
Round 6 (final)	6 June 2027	—

=== Format ===
All rounds are drawn following the conclusion of the previous round. All participating teams enter the tournament in round 1. Matchup restrictions apply in the first two rounds:

- In Round 1, clubs of the Swiss Football League (SL and ChL) cannot be drawn against each other. Furthermore, matchups are regionally drawn.
- In Round 2, teams of the Swiss Super League cannot be drawn against each other.
- From Round 3 onward, no more matchup restrictions apply.

The competitor of the lower league (Note: League rankings: (SL): Swiss Super League (ChL): Swiss Challenge League (PL): Swiss Promotion League (1): 1. Liga (2I): 2. Liga Interregional (2): 2. Liga (3): 3. Liga) has home ground advantage in all rounds except the final, if applicable.

== Results ==
=== First round ===
The first round was drawn on 1 July 2026 at the Haus des Schweizer Fussballs in Muri. The matches were played from 14 to 16 August 2026. Teams' league is indicated in brackets.

Team 1	Score	Team 2
FC Tuggen (1) (Canton of Schwyz)	1–2	(Canton of Zurich) FC Zürich (SL)
FC Rotkreuz (2I) (Canton of Zug)	4–1	(Ticino) AC Bellinzona (PL)
FC Kosova Neuchâtel (2) (Canton of Neuchâtel)	0–6	(Vaud) FC Lausanne-Sport (SL)
FC Wiesendangen (2) (Canton of Zurich)	0–6	(Canton of St. Gallen) SC Brühl SG (PL)
FC Bavois (PL) (Vaud)	0–7	(Canton of Geneva) Servette FC (SL)
Meyrin FC (1) (Canton of Geneva)	3–4 (p)	(Canton of Neuchâtel) Neuchâtel Xamax FCS (ChL)
FC Liestal (2I) (Basel-Landschaft)	0–4	(Canton of Bern) BSC Young Boys (SL)
FC Mutschellen (2) (Aargau)	3–4 (a.e.t.)	(Canton of St. Gallen) FC Winkeln SG (2)
FC Rorschach-Goldach 17 (2I) (Canton of St. Gallen)	2–4	(Canton of Schaffhausen) FC Schaffhausen (PL)
FC Interlaken (2) (Canton of Bern)	1–4	(Canton of Fribourg) FC Bulle (PL)
SC YF Juventus (PL) (Canton of Zurich)	1–6	(Canton of St. Gallen) FC Rapperswil-Jona (ChL)
FC Courtételle (1) (Canton of Jura)	1–6	(Basel-Stadt) FC Basel 1893 (SL)
FC Amical Saint-Prex (PL) (Vaud)	1–3	(Vaud) FC Stade Nyonnais (ChL)
FC Aesch (2) (Basel-Landschaft)	1–5	(Canton of Bern) FC Langenthal (1)
Zürich City SC (2I) (Canton of Zurich)	1–3	(Canton of Zurich) FC Winterthur (ChL)
FC Regensdorf (2) (Canton of Zurich)	0–5	(Canton of Zurich) Grasshopper Club Zürich (SL)
FC Brunnen (2) (Canton of Schwyz)	1–2 (a.e.t.)	(Ticino) AC Taverne (1)
FC Genolier-Begnins (2) (Vaud)	0–2	(Vaud) Pully Football (2I)
FC Collex-Bossy (2I) (Canton of Geneva)	0–2	(Canton of Geneva) Étoile Carouge FC (ChL)
SC Cham (PL) (Canton of Zug)	2–0	(Canton of Lucerne) SC Kriens (ChL)
FC Kerzers (2) (Canton of Fribourg)	1–6	(Valais) FC Sion (SL)
FC Köniz (2I) (Canton of Bern)	3–1	(Canton of Bern) FC Münsingen (1)
SC Buochs (1) (Nidwalden)	0–3	(Canton of Lucerne) FC Luzern (SL)
US Terre Sainte (2I) (Vaud)	0–5	(Vaud) Yverdon Sport FC (ChL)
FC Rebstein (2) (Canton of St. Gallen)	2–6	(Canton of St. Gallen) FC Wil 1900 (ChL)
FC Thalwil (1) (Canton of Zurich)	0–3	(Canton of St. Gallen) FC St. Gallen 1879 (SL)
SV Kaufdorf (4) (Canton of Bern)	0–5	(Basel-Stadt) BSC Old Boys (2I)
FC Biel-Bienne (PL) (Canton of Bern)	4–7 (p)	(Aargau) FC Aarau (ChL)
CS Italien GE (2) (Canton of Geneva)	1–8	(Vaud) FC Stade-Lausanne-Ouchy (ChL)
FC Courrendlin-Courroux (2) (Canton of Jura)	0–1	(Canton of Solothurn) FC Grenchen 15 (2I)
Vedeggio Calcio (2) (Ticino)	1–10	(Ticino) FC Lugano (SL)
FC Saxon Sports (2) (Valais)	0–6	(Canton of Bern) FC Thun (SL)

Last updated: 16 August 2026
Source: Resultate

=== Second round ===
The second round was drawn on 16 August 2026, following the conclusion of the first round. The matches were played from 16 to 18 October 2026. Teams' league is indicated in brackets.

16 October 2026	Stade Lausanne-Ouchy (2)	3–0	Étoile Carouge (2)	Lausanne
19:00 CEST	Freitas 11'; Dantas 13'; Bouchlarhem 34'			Stadium: Pontaise

16 October 2026	Stade Nyonnais (2)	0–3	Basel (1)	Nyon
19:00 CEST			Akpe Victory 6'; Celar 17'; Malouda 87'	Stadium: Colovray; Attendance: 2,093; Referee: Schärer

16 October 2026	Rotkreuz (2I)	0–4	Servette (1)	Rotkreuz
19:00 CEST			Mutandwa (?); Naressi (?); ? (?)	Stadium: Sportpark

17 October 2026	Köniz (2I)	0–2	Brühl (PL)	Köniz
16:00 CEST			Dorta 58' (pen.); Zumberi 90+1'	Stadium: Liebefeld; Attendance: 150; Referee: Wyss

17 October 2026	Bulle (PL)	0–1	Wil (2)	Bulle
16:00 CEST			Rupp 68'	Stadium: Bouleyres

17 October 2026	Old Boys (2I)	1–2	Yverdon-Sport (2)	Basel
17:00 CEST	Türkes 71'		Sessolo 55'; Tasar 67'	Stadium: Schützenmatte

17 October 2026	Rapperswil-Jona (2)	0–2	St. Gallen (1)	Rapperswil-Jona
17:00 CEST			Görtler 32'; Vandermersch 84'	Stadium: Grünfeld

17 October 2026	Winterthur (2)	0–1	Luzern (1)	Winterthur
18:00 CEST			Dorn 90+2'	Stadium: Schützenwiese

17 October 2026	Grenchen (2I)	0–8	Grasshoppers (1)	Grenchen
18:00 CEST			Clemente 13', 37'; Krasniqi 19', 66'; Rissi 31'; Morandi 54'; Lee 69', 78'	Stadium: Brühl

17 October 2026	Cham (PL)	0–2	Sion (1)	Cham
19:00 CEST			Chipperfield 48'; Kololli 90+3'	Stadium: Eizmoos

18 October 2026	Aarau (2)	2–0	Zürich (1)	Aarau
14:00 CEST	Afriyie 67', 83'			Stadium: Brügglifeld

18 October 2026	Schaffhausen (PL)	2–2 (a.e.t.) (9–10 p)	Thun (1)	Schaffhausen
14:00 CEST	Chiappetta 49'; Volkart 120'		Dursun 71' (pen.); Braschi 93' (pen.)	Stadium: FCS Arena; Attendance: 4,358
	Penalties
	? (penalty scored); ? (penalty scored); Saliji (penalty missed); ? (penalty scored); ? (penalty scored); ? (penalty scored); ? (penalty scored); ? (penalty scored); ? (penalty scored); ? (penalty scored); ? (penalty scored)		? (penalty scored); ? (penalty scored); ? (penalty scored); ? (penalty scored); ? (penalty scored); ? (penalty scored); ? (penalty scored); ? (penalty scored); ? (penalty scored); Maier (penalty scored); ? (penalty scored)

18 October 2026	Langenthal (1)	2–3	Neuchâtel Xamax (2)	Langenthal
15:00 CEST	Gülen 45'; Anliker 46'		Bourezak 5'; Abedini 50' (pen.); Neuenschwander 90+1' (o.g.)	Stadium: Rankmatte

18 October 2026	Pully (2I)	0–4	Lugano (1)	Pully
14:00 CEST			Marques 5', 56'; Alioski 16' (pen.); Beausire 45' (o.g.)	Stadium: Pully

18 October 2026	Taverne (1)	0–5	Young Boys (1)	Taverne
14:00 CEST			Jenz 17'; Sanches 23'; Sène 30', 43'; Etoski 32'	Stadium: Taverne

18 October 2026	Winkeln (2)	0–7	Lausanne-Sport (1)	St. Gallen
14:00 CEST			Molebe (?), 54'; Nene 48'; Traoré 72', 73', 84'; ? (?)	Stadium: Gründenmoos; Referee: Von Mandach

=== Third round ===
The third round was drawn on 18 October 2026 during the Schweizer Cup Highlights broadcast on SRF zwei, following the conclusion of the second round earlier that day. The matches are scheduled to be played from 1 to 3 December 2026. Teams' league is indicated in brackets.

1–3 December 2026	Yverdon-Sport (2)	v	Thun (1)	Yverdon-les-Bains
TBD				Stadium: Stade Municipal

1–3 December 2026	Lausanne-Sport (1)	v	Grasshoppers (1)	Lausanne
TBD				Stadium: Stade de la Tuilière

1–3 December 2026	Brühl (PL)	v	Aarau (2)	St. Gallen
TBD				Stadium: Paul-Grüninger-Stadion

1–3 December 2026	St. Gallen (1)	v	Lugano (1)	St. Gallen
TBD				Stadium: Kybunpark

1–3 December 2026	Wil (2)	v	Luzern (1)	Wil
TBD				Stadium: Lidl Arena

1–3 December 2026	Young Boys (1)	v	Basel (1)	Bern
TBD				Stadium: Stadion Wankdorf

1–3 December 2026	Stade Lausanne-Ouchy (2)	v	Sion (1)	Lausanne
TBD				Stadium: Stade Olympique de la Pontaise

1–3 December 2026	Neuchâtel Xamax (2)	v	Servette (1)	Neuchâtel
TBD				Stadium: Stade de la Maladière
