= Lara Keller =

Swiss footballer (born 1991)

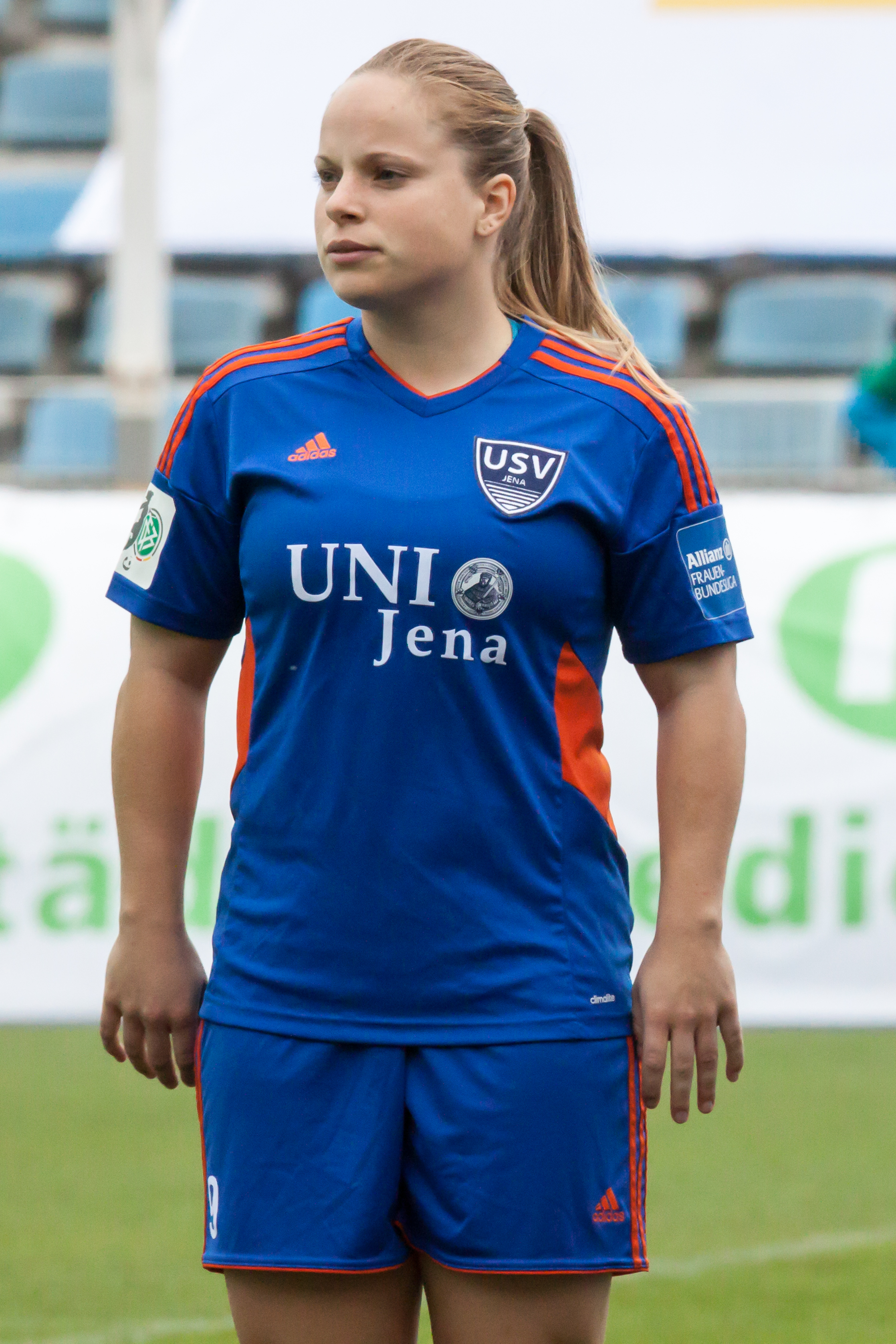
- Keller in 2014

Personal information
- Full name: Lara Keller
- Date of birth: 13 April 1991 (age 35)
- Place of birth: Switzerland
- Height: 1.57 m (5 ft 2 in)
- Positions: Midfielder; striker

Team information
- Current team: FC Zürich
- Number: 10

Youth career
- 2004–2005: FC Erlinsbach
- 2005–2006: FC Baden

Senior career*
Years	Team	Apps	(Gls)
2006–2008	SK Root		
2008–2013	Kriens		
2013	FSV Gütersloh 2009	10	(0)
2013–2015	FF USV Jena	16	(0)
2015–	FC Zürich		

International career
2010–	Switzerland	37	(0)
- * Club domestic league appearances and goals

Lara Keller (born 13 April 1991) is a Swiss football striker currently playing for FC Zürich in the Nationalliga A. She previously played for FF USV Jena of the German Frauen-Bundesliga and before moving to Germany she played for SC Kriens in the Nationalliga A.

She is a member of the Swiss national team since 2010. As an under-19 international she played in the 2010 U-20 World Cup.
