= Stefanie da Eira =

Swiss footballer (born 1992)

Personal information
- Full name: Stefanie de Além da Eira
- Date of birth: 25 September 1992 (age 34)
- Place of birth: Thun, Switzerland
- Height: 1.78 m (5 ft 10 in)
- Position: Attacking midfielder

Team information
- Current team: Alavés

Senior career*
Years	Team	Apps	(Gls)
2008–2009	FC Rot-Schwarz		
2009–2011	Thun	15	(3)
2011–2015	Basel	68	(15)
2015–2016	Zürich	10	(3)
2016–2018	Basel	13	(11)
2018–2020	Grasshoppers	41	(11)
2020–2021	YB Frauen	30	(23)
2021–2022	Real Betis	29	(0)
2022–2023	Sporting de Huelva	6	(2)
2023–	Alavés	7	(0)

International career^{‡}
	Switzerland U17	7	(0)
2009	Switzerland U19	3	(1)
2011–2014	Portugal	3	(0)
2021–	Switzerland	8	(0)
- * Club domestic league appearances and goals as of 29 November 2023 ‡ National team caps and goals as of 29 July 2023

Stefanie de Além da Eira (born 25 September 1992) is a professional footballer who plays as an attacking midfielder for Spanish Primera División club Sporting de Huelva and the Switzerland national team – she has also represented Portugal at international level.

== Early life ==
Da Eira was born in Thun to Portuguese parents.

== Club career ==
Da Eira has played for FC Thun, FC Basel, FC Zürich, Grasshopper Club Zürich and BSC Young Boys in Switzerland and for Real Betis in Spain.

== International career ==
Da Eira played for the Switzerland women's national under-19 football team at the 2010 UEFA Women's Under-19 Championship first qualifying round. She represented Portugal at the UEFA Women's Euro 2013 qualifying and Switzerland at the 2023 FIFA Women's World Cup qualification (UEFA Group G).

== Honours ==
Rot-Schwarz

- Swiss Cup (1): 2008/09

Basel

- Swiss Super League; runner-up: 2012/13, 2014/15, 2017/18
- Swiss Cup (1): 2013/14; runner-up: 2012/13, 2014/15

Zürich

- Swiss Super League (1): 2015/16
- Swiss Cup (1): 2015/16
