= Cavelti =

Cavelti is a surname. Notable people with the surname include:

- Bruno Cavelti (born 1961), Swiss gymnast
- Elsa Cavelti (1907–2001), Swiss opera singer
- Sina Cavelti (born 1998), Swiss footballer
