= Alexandra Szarvas =

Hungarian footballer (born 1992)

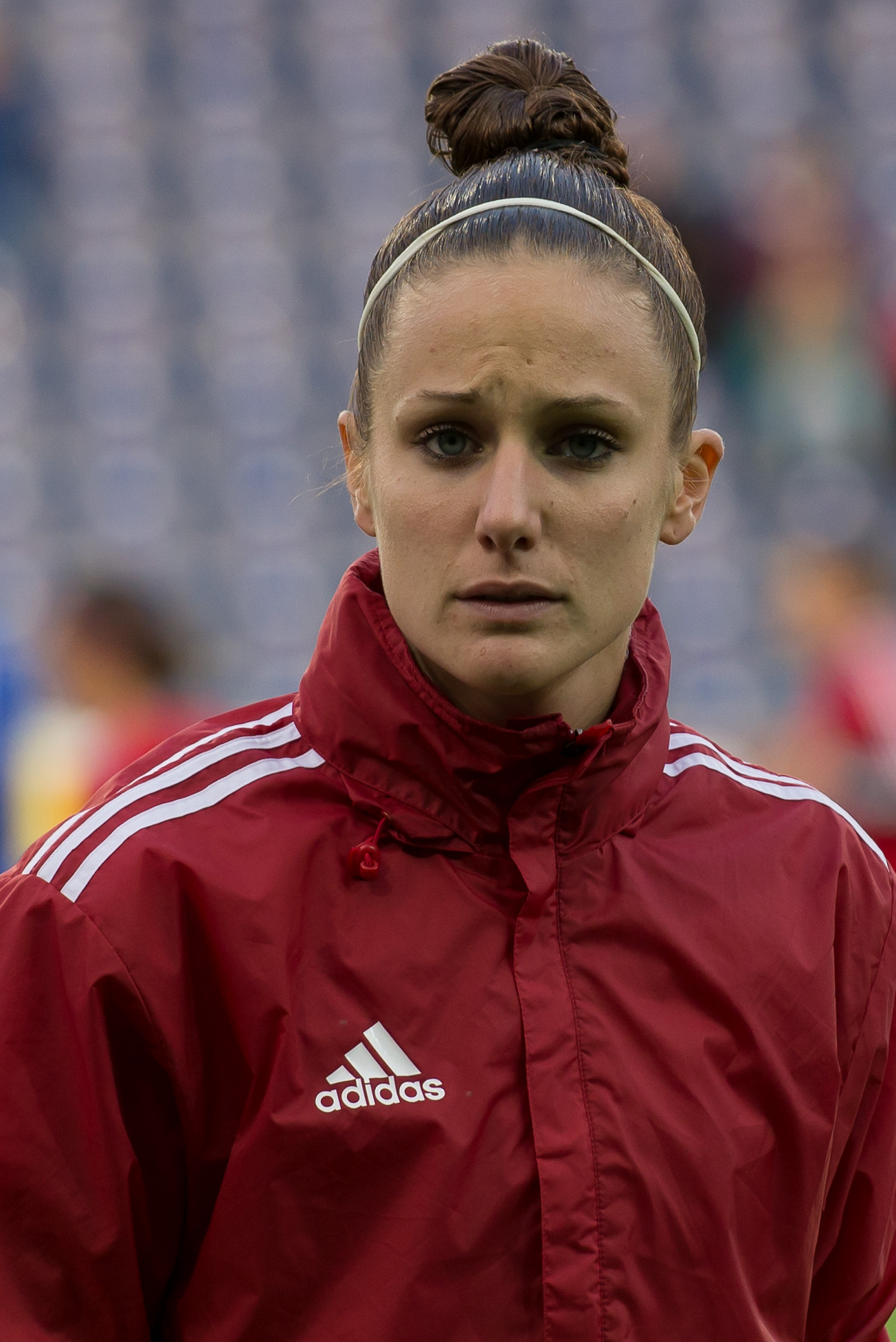
- Alexandra Szarvas 2014

Personal information
- Full name: Alexandra Szarvas
- Date of birth: 7 September 1992 (age 34)
- Place of birth: Budapest, Hungary
- Height: 1.76 m (5 ft 9 1/2 in)
- Position: Striker

Youth career
- 2003: Fót Sportegyesület
- 2003–2005: Gödöllő Goliath DSE
- 2005–2007: Ferencváros

Senior career*
Years	Team	Apps	(Gls)
2007–2008	Ferencváros		
2008–2011	Viktória FC-Szombathely	79	(51)
2011–2012	Bayern Munich II	16	(7)
2012–2013	Sindelfingen	18	(1)
2013–2014	SC Kriens	25	(18)
2014–2017	Basel	56	(21)

International career
2010–2017	Hungary	30	(1)

Managerial career
- 2024–: Hungary
- * Club domestic league appearances and goals

Alexandra Szarvas (born 7 September 1992 in Budapest) is a Hungarian football manager and former striker who is currently the head coach of the Hungary national women's football team.

== Playing career ==
Raised in Ferencváros, Szarvas moved in 2008 to Viktória FC-Szombathely, with which she won the Hungarian Championship and played the UEFA Champions League. In 2011 Bayern Munich, which had knocked out Viktoria in the Champions League, signed Szarvas for its farm team in the 2nd Bundesliga, where she scored 7 goals in 16 appearances. For the 2012–13 season she was transferred to newly promoted VfL Sindelfingen. Later on, Szarvas went to play in Switzerland for SC Kriens and Basel.

She played her first match for the Hungarian national team in November 2010 in a friendly against the Czech Republic.

== Managerial career ==
She was announced to take over the Hungary women's national football team in 2024.

== Titles ==
- 1 Hungarian league: 2009
- 2 Hungarian national cup: 2009, 2011
