= Rahel Graf =

Swiss football player (born 1989)

Personal information
- Date of birth: 1 February 1989 (age 37)
- Place of birth: Pfaffnau, Switzerland
- Position: Midfielder

Team information
- Current team: SC Kriens

Senior career*
Years	Team	Apps	(Gls)
2004–2006	LUwin.ch		
2008	SC Freiburg	6	(0)
2008–2014	SC Kriens		
2014–	FC Luzern		

International career
- Switzerland U-19
2007–2012	Switzerland	62	
- * Club domestic league appearances and goals

Rahel Graf (born 1 February 1989) is a Swiss women's footballer, who has 62 appearances for the national team. At club level, she plays for FC Luzern Frauen.

== Personal life ==
Graf grew up in Pfaffnau, Switzerland, and her father is a Lucerne councillor. As of 2016, she lives in Ennetbürgen, and was studying social security.

== Career ==
=== Domestic ===
Graf played for LUwin.ch from 2004 to 2006. (Note: LUwin.ch was known as FC Sursee until 2004, and then as FC Luzern, before being renamed LUwin.ch.) She won the Nationalliga A, and won the Swiss Women's Cup three times with them. In 2005, Graf made her first appearance in the UEFA Women's Champions League, in a 5–1 win for LUwin.ch.

In 2008, Graf transferred to German Frauen-Bundesliga team SC Freiburg, before moving to SC Kriens. In 2014, she transferred to FC Luzern Frauen. She captained FC Luzern as they reached the Swiss Women's Cup semi-final in 2018.

=== International ===
Graf has 62 appearances for the Switzerland. She played for Switzerland U-19 at the 2006 UEFA Women's Under-19 Championship. She made her senior debut in 2007. She played for the senior team in 2011 FIFA Women's World Cup qualification matches, and was sent off in the first-leg playoff against Italy. Switzerland lost the match 1–0. She made 19 further appearances for the national team between 2011 and 2013.
