= Therese Simonsson =

Swedish footballer (born 1998)

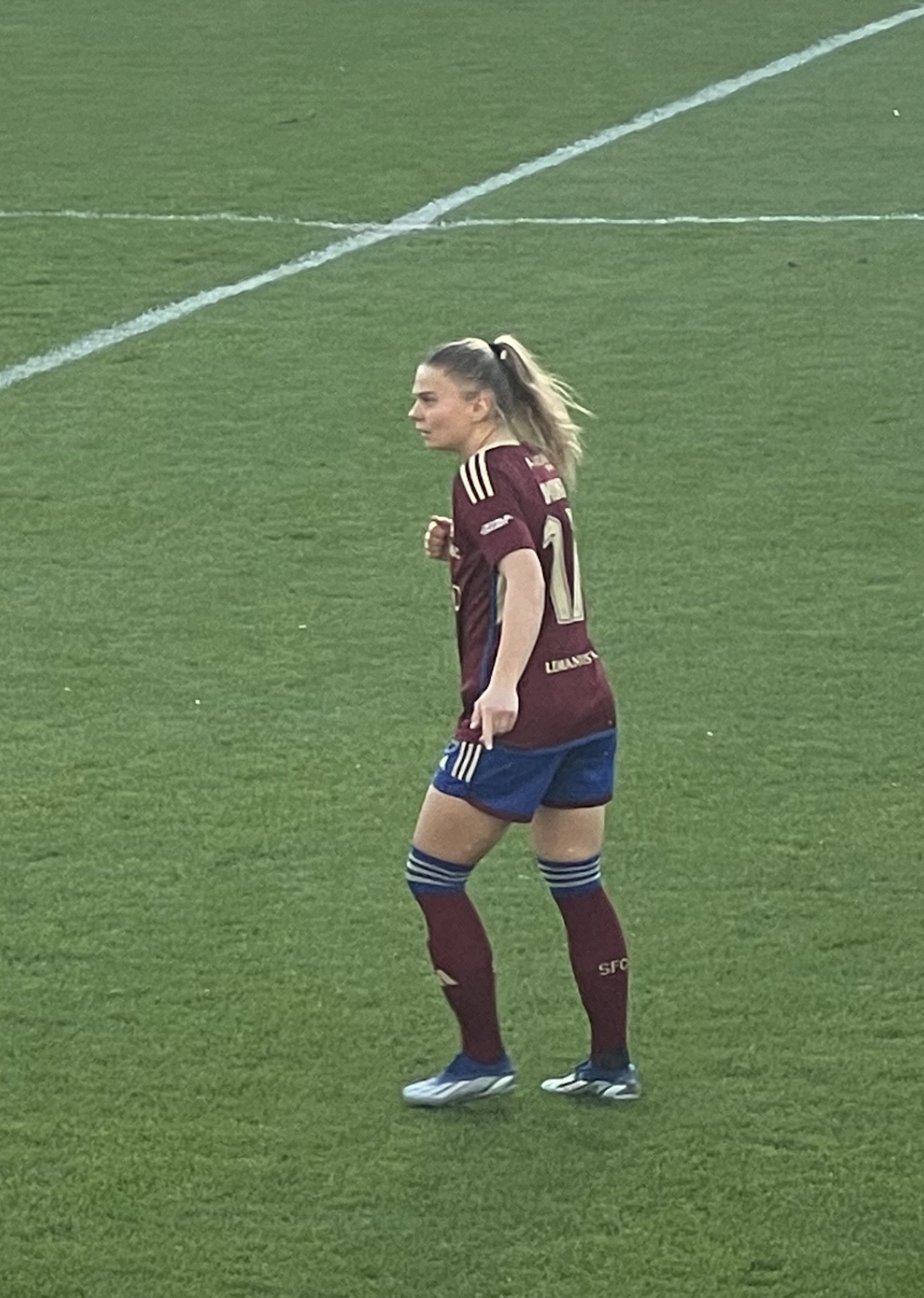
- Simonsson with Servette in 2024

Personal information
- Full name: Anna María Therese Simonsson
- Date of birth: 3 May 1998 (age 28)
- Place of birth: Stockholm, Sweden
- Height: 1.75 m (5 ft 9 in)
- Position: Forward

Team information
- Current team: RB Leipzig
- Number: 27

Senior career*
Years	Team	Apps	(Gls)
2012–2015	Vasalund	3+	(0)
2016	Älta	26	(11)
2017	Uppsala	26	(9)
2018–2019	AIK	51	(28)
2020	Umeå	21	(8)
2021–2022	Linköping	40	(8)
2022–2023	Sporting de Huelva	11	(1)
2023-2026	Servette	66	(25)
2026–	RB Leipzig	6	(0)

International career
2014	Sweden U17	11	(5)
2016–2017	Sweden U19	7	(1)
2018–2021	Sweden U23	4	(0)
- * Club domestic league appearances and goals as of 21:44, 7 October 2026 (UTC)

Therese Simonsson (born 3 May 1998) is a Swedish professional footballer who plays as a forward for Frauen-Bundesliga club RB Leipzig.

== Honours ==
Servette

- Swiss Women's Super League: 2023–24, 2025–26
- Swiss Women's Cup: 2023–24, 2025–26

Individual

- Swiss Women's Super League Golden 11: 2025–26
- Swiss Women's Super League Best Player: 2025–26
- Swiss Women's Super League top scorer: 2025–26
