= Zumberi =

Zumberi is a surname. Notable people with the surname include:

- Lavdim Zumberi (born 1999), Swiss footballer
- Valon Zumberi (born 2002), Kosovan footballer
