= SC Kriens (women) =

Female association football club in Switzerland

- Full name: Sport Club Kriens Frauen
- Ground: Stadion Kleinfeld, Kriens, Switzerland
- Capacity: 5,100
- Chairman: Peter Glur
- Manager: René Müller
- League: Nationalliga A
- 2010-11: 6th
Home colours	Away colours

SC Kriens Frauen is a Swiss women's football club from Kriens representing SC Kriens in the Frauen Nationalliga A. It was founded as SK Root. The team has been active in the Swiss women's leagues since at least 1985.

Root appeared for the first time in the Nationalliga A in 2000 and 2002, but it wasn't able to avoid relegation both times. Its third appearance in 2008 marked its first successful campaign in the category. Following the end of the season, Root became Kriens' women's team, with Root's former farm team representing the former club in the lower categories. It has since established itself in the NLA with 4th, 5th, and 6th spots in the next three seasons.

In 2012, the team finished runners-up to Zürich.

For the 2014/15 season, three teams of SC Kriens joined FC Luzern Frauen. They were a team in the Nationalliga A, and Under-18 and U-16 youth teams. The merger was agreed on to join forces in the central Switzerland region.

== 2011-12 squad ==
Note: Flags indicate national team as defined under FIFA eligibility rules; some limited exceptions apply. Players may hold more than one non-FIFA nationality.

No.	Pos.	Nation	Player
—	GK	(Switzerland) SUI	Sabina Odermatt
—	DF	(Switzerland) SUI	Marijana Brezovski
—	DF	(Switzerland) SUI	Marie Andrea Egli
—	DF	(Switzerland) SUI	Rahel Graf
—	DF	(Switzerland) SUI	Vera Lötscher
—	DF	(Switzerland) SUI	Natalie Maurer
—	DF	(Switzerland) SUI	Rahel Sager
—	MF	(Switzerland) SUI	Beatrice Burger
—	MF	(Switzerland) SUI	Nicole Heer
—	MF	(Switzerland) SUI	Medina Mehmedagic

No.	Pos.	Nation	Player
—	MF	(Switzerland) SUI	Luzia Odermatt
—	MF	(Switzerland) SUI	Carole Renggli
—	MF	(Portugal) POR	Ana Rita da Silva
—	MF	(Switzerland) SUI	Valerie Zürny
—	FW	(Switzerland) SUI	Nicole Gassmann
—	FW	(Switzerland) SUI	Scilla Grossi
—	FW	(Switzerland) SUI	Nadja Hegglin
—	FW	(Switzerland) SUI	Lara Keller
—	FW	(Switzerland) SUI	Cristina Afonso
—	FW	(Switzerland) SUI	Angela Stocker
