= Monica Di Fonzo =

Swiss footballer and manager (born 1977)

Personal information
- Full name: Monica Di Fonzo
- Date of birth: 14 February 1977 (age 49)
- Place of birth: Switzerland
- Position: Striker

Senior career*
Years	Team	Apps	(Gls)
- Sursee
2003–2004	Freiburg	28	(0)

International career
- Switzerland U-17
- Switzerland

Managerial career
- 2011: Schlieren
- * Club domestic league appearances and goals

Monica Di Fonzo is a Swiss former football striker and current manager who played for FC Sursee in the Nationalliga A and SC Freiburg in the German Bundesliga, taking part in the UEFA Women's Cup with the former. Named Swiss Footballer of the Year in 2002, she was a member of the Swiss national team.
