= 2026–27 Swiss Women's Super League =

Swiss Women's Super League
- Season: 2026–27

The 2026–27 season of the Super League, also known as AXA Women's Super League for sponsorship reasons, is the 57th edition of the Swiss top-tier women's football league.

== Team changes ==
=== Relegated to 2026–27 Nationalliga B ===
- FC Sion Féminin

== League table ==
Pos	Team	Pld	W	D	L	GF	GA	GD	Pts	Status
1	Servette Chênois	9	7	1	1	22	9	+13	22	Qualification to play-offs
2	Zürich	9	5	3	1	24	11	+13	18	Qualification to play-offs
3	YB Frauen	9	5	3	1	17	12	+5	18	Qualification to play-offs
4	GC Zürich	9	5	2	2	25	11	+14	17	Qualification to play-offs
5	Basel	9	3	3	3	13	13	0	12	Qualification to play-offs
6	Luzern	9	3	2	4	14	15	−1	11	Qualification to play-offs
7	Rapperswil-Jona	9	3	2	4	17	21	−4	11	Qualification to play-offs
8	Yverdon	9	2	2	5	15	18	−3	8	Qualification to play-offs
9	St. Gallen	9	1	1	7	8	24	−16	4	Qualification to qualifying round
10	Aarau	9	1	1	7	10	31	−21	4	Qualification to qualifying round

Updated to match(es) played on 18 October 2026. Source: AWSL

== Results ==
Home \ Away	AAR	BAS	GCZ	LUZ	RAP	SER	STG	YBF	YVE	ZÜR
Aarau		3–1	1–5	0–1				1–2		0–8
Basel			1–1		2–2		1–0	2–0		
GC Zürich				0–0	6–0	1–3				4–1
Luzern		1–2			2–0		3–1		3–3	
Rapperswil-Jona	5–2					1–2	4–1	1–1		2–4
Servette Chênois	3–0	2–1		4–1					3–2	0–0
St. Gallen	2–2		1–4			0–3			1–0	
YB Frauen			3–2	2–1		3–2	4–1		1–1	
Yverdon	4–1	3–2	1–2		1–2					0–3
Zürich		1–1		3–2			3–1	1–1		

Updated to match(es) played on 18 October 2026. Source: AWSL
Legend: Blue = home team win; Yellow = draw; Red = away team win.

== Qualifying round ==
Pos	Team	Pld	W	D	L	GF	GA	GD	Pts	Promotion or relegation	TBD1	TBD2	TBD3	TBD4
1	TBD	0	0	0	0	0	0	0	0	Promotion to 2027–28 Super League				
2	TBD	0	0	0	0	0	0	0	0	Promotion to 2027–28 Super League				
3	TBD	0	0	0	0	0	0	0	0	Relegation to 2027–28 Nationalliga B				
4	TBD	0	0	0	0	0	0	0	0	Relegation to 2027–28 Nationalliga B				

Updated to match(es) played on unknown. Source: AWSL.ch
Legend: Blue = home team win; Yellow = draw; Red = away team win.
Rules for classification: Tiebreakers
