= 2025–26 Promotion League =

Promotion League
- Season: 2025–26
- Dates: 2 August 2025 – 30 May 2026
- Champions: SC Kriens
- Promoted: SC Kriens
- Relegated: FC Lausanne-Sport II; Vevey-Sports
- Matches: 306
- Top goalscorer: Omer Dzonlagic (29)
- Biggest home win: Kriens 8-0 Vevey-Sports
- Biggest away win: Lugano II 0-6 Young Boys II
- Total attendance: 4,963
- Average attendance: 496
- All statistics correct as of 27 July 2026.

The 2025–26 Promotion League season (known as the Hoval Promotion League for sponsorship reasons) is the 14th edition (12th under its current name) of the 3rd tier of the Swiss football league system under its current format.

== Overview ==
Eighteen teams competed in the league, 15 from the previous season, one team relegated from the 2024–25 Swiss Challenge League and two teams promoted from the 2024–25 Swiss 1. Liga Classic.

== Team changes ==
=== Outgoing ===
==== Promoted to 2025–26 Challenge League ====
- FC Rapperswil-Jona

==== Relegated to 2025–26 1. Liga Classic ====
- FC Baden
- SR Delémont

=== Incoming ===
==== Relegated from 2024-2025 Swiss Challenge League ====
- FC Schaffhausen

==== Promoted from 1st League Classic ====
- FC Kreuzlingen
- FC Lausanne-Sport II

== Teams ==
Location of the 2025–26 Promotion League teams

Club	Canton	Stadium	Capacity
FC Basel II	Basel-City	Stadion Rankhof or Youth Campus Basel	7,000; 1,000
FC Bavois	Vaud	Terrain des Peupliers	659
FC Biel-Bienne	Biel/Bienne	Tissot Arena	5,200
FC Breitenrain Bern	Bern	Spitalacker	1,450
SC Brühl	St. Gallen	Paul-Grüninger-Stadion	4,200
FC Bulle	Fribourg	Stade de Bouleyres	7,000
SC Cham	Zug	Stadion Eizmoos	1,800
Grand-Saconnex	Geneva	Stade du Blanché	1,000
SC Kriens	Lucerne	Stadion Kleinfeld	5,360
FC Kreuzlingen	Thurgau	Sportplatz Hafenareal	1,200
Lausanne-Sport II	Vaud	Stade du Bois-Gentil	3,500
FC Lugano II	Ticino	Cornaredo Stadium	6,330
FC Luzern II	Lucerne	Swissporarena or Allmend Süd	16,800; 2,000
FC Paradiso	Ticino	Campo Pian Scairolo	1,000
FC Schaffhausen	Schaffhausen	Berformance Arena	8,200
Vevey-Sports	Vaud	Stade de Copet	4,000
BSC Young Boys II	Bern	Stadion Wankdorf	32,000
FC Zürich II	Zürich	Sportplatz Heerenschürli	1,120

== League table ==
Pos	Team	Pld	W	D	L	GF	GA	GD	Pts	Promotion, qualification or relegation
1	Kriens (C, P)	34	25	4	5	100	43	+57	79	Promotion to Challenge League and qualification for Swiss Cup
2	Brühl	34	22	6	6	89	46	+43	72	Qualification for Swiss Cup
3	Biel-Bienne	34	19	7	8	78	46	+32	64	Qualification for Swiss Cup
4	Basel II	34	17	8	9	65	48	+17	59	Ineligible for promotion
5	Bavois	34	17	4	13	64	53	+11	55	Qualification for Swiss Cup
6	Young Boys II	34	15	9	10	66	52	+14	54	Ineligible for promotion
7	Schaffhausen	34	16	5	13	51	46	+5	53	Qualification for Swiss Cup
8	Bulle	34	15	6	13	70	64	+6	51	Qualification for Swiss Cup
9	Cham	34	14	8	12	62	61	+1	50	Qualification for Swiss Cup
10	Grand-Saconnex	34	11	10	13	71	69	+2	43	
11	Zürich II	34	11	8	15	59	62	−3	41	Ineligible for promotion
12	Breitenrain	34	11	8	15	47	51	−4	41	
13	Luzern II	34	10	10	14	80	83	−3	40	Ineligible for promotion
14	Kreuzlingen	34	8	13	13	43	66	−23	37	
15	Lugano II	34	8	12	14	45	75	−30	36	Ineligible for promotion
16	Paradiso	34	8	11	15	51	65	−14	35	
17	Lausanne-Sport II (R)	34	9	4	21	60	84	−24	31	Relegation to the 1. Liga Classic
18	Vevey-Sports (R)	34	1	5	28	28	115	−87	5 (Note: A 3-point deduction was set for Vevey-Sports due to non-compliance with the specific rules governing the league.)	Relegation to the 1. Liga Classic

Source: Erste Liga/Premiere Ligue/Prima Lega - Match center
Rules for classification: 1) Points; 2) Goal difference; 3) Goals scored; 4) Head-to-head goal difference; 5) Away goals scored; 6) Draw.
(C) Champions; (P) Promoted; (R) Relegated

== Results ==
Home \ Away	BAS	BAV	BIE	BRE	BRU	BUL	CHA	GSA	KRE	KRI	LS	LUG	LUZ	PAR	FCS	VEV	YB	ZUR
Basel II	—	1–4	1–3	0–0	2–2	2–1	3–0	0–1	2–4	3–1	2–1	3–2	3–2	5–0	2–1	3–0	1–0	4–4
Bavois	0–2	—	3–2	1–1	1–2	0–0	3–2	2–0	1–3	2–0	2–1	4–1	3–1	3–2	3–0	3–1	0–0	2–3
Biel-Bienne	1–2	5–2	—	3–1	1–0	4–1	3–1	1–1	4–0	3–1	4–1	1–1	4–2	0–0	1–0	4–1	3–2	2–4
Breitenrain	1–0	1–0	2–2	—	1–3	2–1	3–1	1–1	2–0	0–2	1–0	2–3	2–3	0–1	1–2	3–0	3–0	3–1
Brühl	1–0	3–1	2–0	1–0	—	2–1	4–0	4–3	5–0	4–1	3–1	4–1	0–0	2–1	1–1	7–1	2–2	3–1
Bulle	2–3	3–0	1–4	1–0	3–1	—	2–4	3–1	1–2	1–2	5–1	2–0	4–2	2–1	2–0	5–0	3–4	1–3
Cham	1–1	0–2	3–2	2–2	0–5	4–1	—	2–1	2–2	2–2	3–5	6–0	3–1	2–1	0–2	3–1	1–1	2–0
Grand-Saconnex	1–1	1–3	3–2	1–1	3–1	3–4	1–0	—	6–3	3–4	1–1	2–3	3–2	2–3	3–0	7–0	2–3	3–2
Kreuzlingen	2–2	4–1	1–1	1–0	0–2	1–1	2–1	2–2	—	1–5	2–0	1–1	1–1	0–4	2–2	2–1	0–2	1–3
Kriens	3–2	2–1	2–0	5–1	4–0	2–2	2–3	4–1	5–1	—	3–0	5–2	4–0	4–0	2–1	8–0	2–1	6–2
Lausanne-Sport II	0–1	1–4	2–2	3–1	3–5	1–1	0–2	5–1	3–0	4–5	—	2–0		5–0	2–1	2–1	2–4	0–4
Lugano II	4–2	1–1	1–0	0–4	4–2	1–1	0–3	0–3	1–0	1–1	2–2	—	2–2	2–2	0–0	0–0	0–6	0–0
Luzern II	1–1	3–1	1–4	2–3	2–2	2–3	3–3	4–4	3–0	2–2	4–2	4–2	—	2–2	3–2	8–1	0–4	0–0
Paradiso	2–3	2–1	2–2	4–0	2–5	3–3	0–2	0–0	1–1	0–1	3–0	1–1	7–5	—	1–2	3–0	2–4	1–2
Schaffhausen	1–6	3–1	0–2	1–1	1–1	1–2	3–0	3–0	1–0	0–2	2–1	4–2	2–1	1–0	—	4–0	0–1	2–0
Vevey-Sports	2–1	0–4	1–3	2–2	0–1	2–3	1–2	1–3	1–2	0–2	4–5	1–3	2–3	0–2	0–2	—	0–0	1–1
Young Boys II	0–0	0–2	0–2	3–2	4–2	4–1	1–1	2–2	1–1	0–2	3–1	3–2	3–2	1–1	3–5	4–1	—	0–3
Zürich II	0–1	2–3	1–3	1–0	1–3	2–3	1–1	2–2	1–1	0–4	2–1	1–2	2–3	1–1	0–1	8–1	1–0	—

Updated to match(es) played on 21 November 2025. Source: Erste Liga - Match center
Legend: Blue = home team win; Yellow = draw; Red = away team win.
