= David Mištrafović =

Swiss footballer (born 2001)

David Mistrafović
Personal information
- Date of birth: 25 May 2001 (age 25)
- Place of birth: Lucerne, Switzerland
- Height: 1.86 m (6 ft 1 in)
- Position: Midfielder

Team information
- Current team: Brühl
- Number: 20

Youth career
- 2009–2011: Emmen
- 2011–2019: Luzern

Senior career*
Years	Team	Apps	(Gls)
2019–2022	Luzern	16	(0)
2020–2022	→ Kriens (loan)	69	(2)
2022–2023	Helmond Sport	12	(0)
2023–2025	Varaždin	13	(0)
2025–2026	Posušje	6	(0)
2026–	Brühl	9	(0)

International career^{‡}
2016	Switzerland U15	2	(0)
2017	Switzerland U17	2	(0)
2019–2020	Switzerland U19	8	(0)
2020	Switzerland U20	1	(0)
- * Club domestic league appearances and goals as of 28 September 2026 ‡ National team caps and goals as of 7 October 2020

David Mistrafović (born 25 May 2001) is a Swiss professional footballer who plays as a midfielder for Brühl.

== Club career ==
He joined Kriens on loan before the 2020–21 season. On 23 July 2021, the loan was extended for another year.

Mistrafović joined Dutch Eerste Divisie club Helmond Sport on 22 June 2022, signing a three-year deal.

On 23 August 2023, Helmond Sport announced Mistrafović's transfer to Varaždin in Croatia.

== International career ==
Mistrafović was born in Switzerland and is of Bosnian and Croatian descent. He is a youth international for Switzerland
