= Wibke Meister =

German footballer

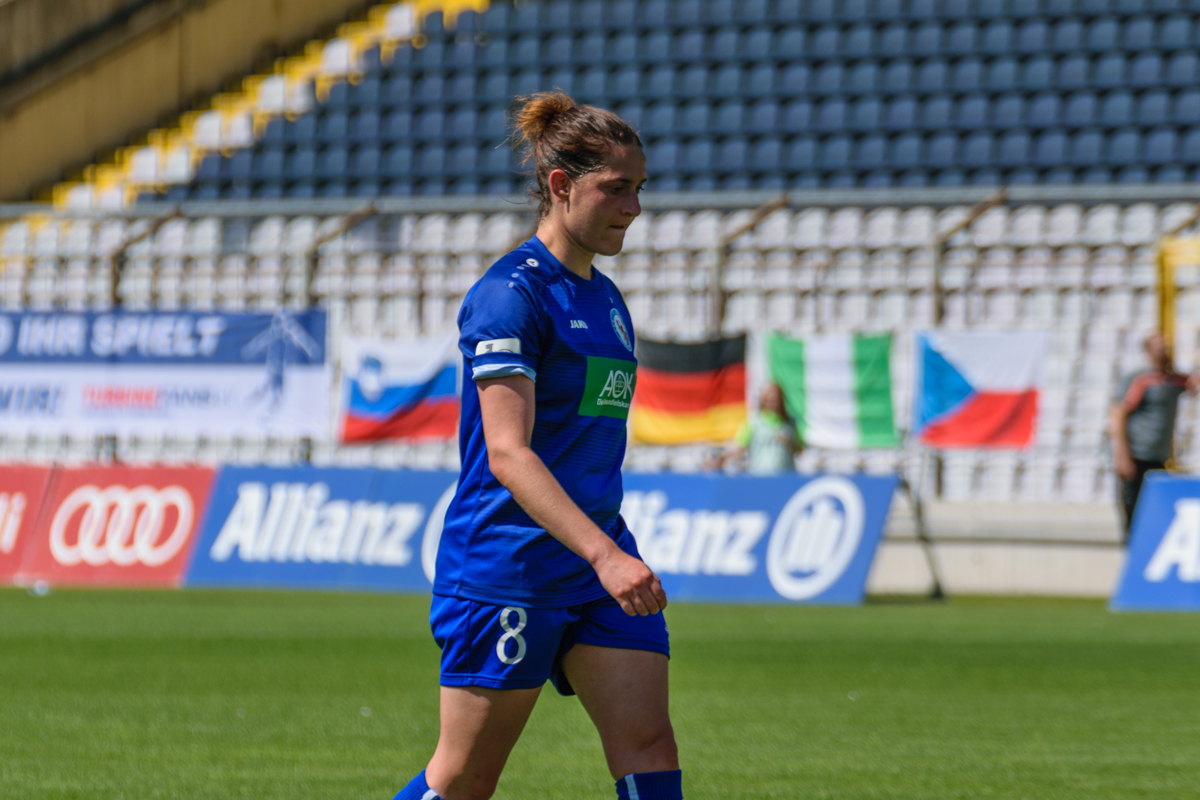

Personal information
- Date of birth: 12 March 1995 (age 31)
- Place of birth: Bergen, Germany
- Height: 1.61 m (5 ft 3 in)
- Position: Defender

Team information
- Current team: YB Frauen
- Number: 18

Senior career*
Years	Team	Apps	(Gls)
2010–2019	1. FFC Turbine Potsdam	45	(3)
2019–2021	Sporting CP		
2021–2023	1. FFC Turbine Potsdam	24	(1)
2023-	YB Frauen	7	(0)

International career
2012	Germany U17		
2014	Germany U20		
- * Club domestic league appearances and goals

Wibke Meister (born 12 March 1995) is a German footballer who plays as a defender for BSC YB Frauen.

== Career ==
Meister started her career playing with 1. FFC Turbine Potsdam from 2010 to 2019, after which she played for Sporting CP for two years before transferring back to 1. FFC Turbine Potsdam.
