= Veronica Maglia =

Swiss footballer (born 1989)

Personal information
- Full name: Veronica Maglia
- Date of birth: 1 December 1989 (age 36)
- Place of birth: Münsterlingen, Switzerland
- Height: 1.70 m (5 ft 7 in)
- Position: Striker

Senior career*
Years	Team	Apps	(Gls)
- YB Frauen
2011–2015	Torres	11	(0)
2015–2016	Transportes Alcaine		
- * Club domestic league appearances and goals

Veronica Maglia is a Swiss striker currently playing in Italy's Serie A for Torres CF, with whom she has also played the Champions League. She previously played for YB Frauen in the Swiss Nationalliga A.
