= Maria Macri =

Italian footballer (born 1966)

Personal information
- Date of birth: 17 January 1966 (age 60)
- Position: Forward

Maria Macri (born 17 January 1966) is an Italian manager and former player. A forward, she played for FCF Rapid Lugano in the Swiss Women's Super League.
