= 2026–27 Nationalliga B (women's football) =

Nationalliga B
- Season: 2026–27
- Dates: 8 August 2026 –
- Matches: 78
- Goals: 306 (3.92 per match)
- Biggest home win: Küssnacht 6–0 Oerlikon/Polizei (9 September 2026); Thun 6–0 Sion (9 September 2026); Winterthur 6–0 Gambarogno (4 October 2026); Winterthur 6–0 Oerlikon/Polizei (18 October 2026)
- Biggest away win: Oerlikon/Polizei 2–9 Thun (29 August 2026)
- Highest scoring: Oerlikon/Polizei 2–9 Thun (29 August 2026)
- Longest winning run: 9 matches Winterthur
- Longest unbeaten run: 12 matches Thun
- Longest winless run: 10 matches Oerlikon/Polizei
- Longest losing run: 10 matches Oerlikon/Polizei
- All statistics correct as of 14 November 2026.

The 2026–27 Nationalliga B is the 2026–27 season of the Nationalliga B, the second-tier women's association football competition in Switzerland.

== Team changes ==
=== Promoted to 2026–27 Swiss Women's Super League ===
- FC Yverdon Féminin

=== Relegated to 2026–27 1. Liga ===
- FC Solothurn Frauen
- FC Wädenswil

== League table ==
Pos	Team	Pld	W	D	L	GF	GA	GD	Pts	Status
1	Thun	13	11	1	1	54	13	+41	34	Qualification to promotion play-offs
2	Winterthur	13	10	0	3	41	17	+24	30	Qualification to promotion play-offs
3	Küssnacht	13	8	2	3	34	16	+18	26	Qualification to placement 3rd-7th round
4	Wil	13	8	2	3	28	15	+13	26	Qualification to placement 3rd-7th round
5	Schlieren	13	6	2	5	26	22	+4	20	Qualification to placement 3rd-7th round
6	Sion	13	6	1	6	24	30	−6	19	Qualification to placement 3rd-7th round
7	Ostermundigen	13	5	3	5	23	22	+1	18	Qualification to placement 3rd-7th round
8	Basel	13	5	2	6	18	29	−11	17	Qualification to placement 8th-12th round
9	Étoile Carouge	13	4	3	6	19	26	−7	15	Qualification to placement 8th-12th round
10	Lugano	13	2	1	10	17	34	−17	7	Qualification to placement 8th-12th round
11	Gambarogno	13	2	1	10	9	37	−28	7	Qualification to placement 8th-12th round
12	Oerlikon/Polizei	13	2	0	11	13	45	−32	6	Qualification to placement 8th-12th round

Updated to match(es) played on 14 November 2026. Source: SFA

=== Results ===
Home \ Away	BAS	CAR	GAM	KUS	LUG	OER	OST	SCH	SIO	THU	WIL	WIN
Basel				0–4	0–2		1–5	2–1	2–0		2–0	
Étoile Carouge	3–0			3–2	4–2		1–1	0–1		1–4		
Gambarogno	0–1	2–2		1–2		2–1		0–2			1–6	
Küssnacht		2–0			1–0	6–0	0–0	5–2	3–0		2–2	
Lugano	3–3		1–3	2–4						1–7	1–2	0–2
Oerlikon/Polizei	2–5	0–2	1–0		2–1				1–3	2–9	1–4	
Ostermundigen			4–0		1–0	3–1		3–3			0–1	2–0
Schlieren			4–0		4–0	2–1	3–2			1–3		1–2
Sion		3–2	4–0		1–4	2–1	5–0	2–2				2–1
Thun	1–1	5–0	3–0	2–1			4–1		6–0			0–1
Wil	3–0	0–0					3–1	2–0	2–1	2–4		1–2
Winterthur	5–1	4–1	6–0	4–2		6–0			6–1	2–6		

Updated to match(es) played on 14 November 2026. Source: SFA
Legend: Blue = home team win; Yellow = draw; Red = away team win.

== Placement round ==
=== Places 3–7 ===
Pos	Team	Pld	W	D	L	GF	GA	GD	Pts
1	TBD	0	0	0	0	0	0	0	0
2	TBD	0	0	0	0	0	0	0	0
3	TBD	0	0	0	0	0	0	0	0
4	TBD	0	0	0	0	0	0	0	0
5	TBD	0	0	0	0	0	0	0	0

Source: SFA

=== Places 8–12 ===
Pos	Team	Pld	W	D	L	GF	GA	GD	Pts	
1	TBD	0	0	0	0	0	0	0	0	
2	TBD	0	0	0	0	0	0	0	0	
3	TBD	0	0	0	0	0	0	0	0	
4	TBD	0	0	0	0	0	0	0	0	Relegated to the 1. Liga
5	TBD	0	0	0	0	0	0	0	0	Relegated to the 1. Liga

Source: SFA
