= Lisa Josten =

German footballer (born 1993)

Personal information
- Date of birth: 7 January 1993 (age 33)
- Height: 1.60 m (5 ft 3 in)
- Position: Forward

Team information
- Current team: BSC YB Frauen

Senior career*
Years	Team	Apps	(Gls)
2010–2011	VfL Bochum II		
2011–2015	VfL Bochum		
2015–2017	BV Cloppenburg	41	(7)
2017–2018	Werder Bremen	13	(0)
2018–2019	BV Cloppenburg	35	(5)
2021–2023	SV Meppen	46	(6)
2023–2024	Werder Bremen	7	(0)
2024	MSV Duisburg	9	(0)
2024–	BSC YB Frauen		
- * Club domestic league appearances and goals

Lisa Josten (born 7 January 1993) is a German footballer who plays as a forward for BSC YB Frauen.
