= Jara Ackermann =

Liechtensteiner footballer (born 2004)

Personal information
- Date of birth: 20 May 2004 (age 22)
- Place of birth: Walenstadt, Switzerland
- Height: 1.75 m (5 ft 9 in)
- Position: Goalkeeper

Team information
- Current team: Young Boys
- Number: 1

Youth career
- –2020: Sargans

Senior career*
Years	Team	Apps	(Gls)
2020–2022	St. Gallen-Staad	0	(0)
2022–	Young Boys	42	(0)

International career^{‡}
2019	Liechtenstein U-16	3	(0)
2021–2023	Liechtenstein U-19	9	(0)
2021–	Liechtenstein	2	(0)
- * Club domestic league appearances and goals as of 6 June 2026 ‡ National team caps and goals as of 6 June 2026

Jara Ackermann (born 20 May 2004) is a Liechtensteiner footballer who plays as a goalkeeper for Young Boys and the Liechtenstein national football team.

== Career statistics ==
=== International ===
Liechtenstein
Year	Apps	Goals
2021	2	0
Total	2	0
