= Seydou Traoré =

Seydou Traoré may refer to:

- Seydou Traoré (politician) (born 1936), veterinarian and politician from Upper Volta (now Burkina Faso)
- Seydou Traoré (footballer) (born 1970), footballer for Burkina Faso
- Seydou Traore (American football) (born 2002), English player of American football
