= 2026–27 Swiss Super League =

130th season of top-tier Swiss football

Swiss Super League
- Season: 2026–27
- Dates: 24 July 2026 – 30 May 2027
- Top goalscorer: Samuel Essende (4 goals)
- Biggest home win: Lugano 5–0 Zürich (9 August 2026)
- Biggest away win: Thun 0–6 Young Boys (1 August 2026)
- Highest scoring: Young Boys 4–2 Sion (26 July 2026); Thun 0–6 Young Boys (1 August 2026); Basel 4–2 Thun (9 August 2026)
- Longest winning run: 3 matches Lugano
- Longest unbeaten run: 3 matches Young Boys; Lugano; St. Gallen; Lausanne-Sport
- Longest winless run: 3 matches Grasshoppers; Vaduz; Luzern
- Longest losing run: 3 matches Vaduz
- Highest attendance: 26,572; Young Boys 4–2 Sion (26 July 2026)
- Lowest attendance: 5,878; Lausanne-Sport 1–1 Grasshopper (25 July 2026)
- Average attendance: 12,124
- All statistics correct as of 24 May 2026.

The 2026–27 Swiss Super League (referred to as the Brack Super League for sponsoring reasons) will be the 130th season of top-tier competitive football in Switzerland, and the 24th under its current name. It will be the third season featuring a new format and increased number of participants, since the beginning of the Super League era in 2003. The defending champions are Thun.

== Overview ==
=== Format and schedule ===
The Swiss Football League (SFL) released a detailed schedule on 28 November 2025:

- The season will begin on 24 July 2026 and conclude on 30 May 2027.
- The league will go on winter break after matchday 19 on 20 December 2026 and resume on 16 January 2027. The final matchday of the relegation group will take place on 27 May, while the championship group will hold its last matches 30 May 2026.
- The two legs of the relegation play-offs are scheduled for 1 and 4 June 2027, respectively.

The season is divided into two phases:

- In a first phase all twelve teams play each other three times each, for a total of 33 matchdays and concludes on 12 April 2026.
- Following that, the league is split into two groups of six each, one championship group and one relegation group. The second phase begins on 25 April 2026.
  - Each team will play every other team in their group one time (five matches each), for a total of 38 matchdays.
  - The championship group will play for the title of Swiss Football Champion and qualification for European championships. Final matchday is on 17 May 2026.
  - The relegation group will play against relegation (last place) and the relegation play-off (second-to-last place). Final matchday will be on 4 June 2027.
- Points won in the first phase are carried over to the second phase.

=== Team changes ===
FC Vaduz return to the top tier after a five-year absence. FC Winterthur were relegated to Challenge League after four years in the top tier.

== Teams ==
=== Stadia and locations ===
FC Basel	Grasshopper Club Zurich	FC Zürich	FC Lausanne-Sport	FC Lugano
St. Jakob-Park	Letzigrund		Stade de la Tuilière	AIL Arena
Basel	Zurich		Lausanne	Lugano
Capacity: 37,994	Capacity: 26,103		Capacity: 12,544	Capacity: 8,793
FC Luzern	Location of the 2025–26 Swiss Super League teams			Servette FC
Thermoplan Arena	Location of the 2025–26 Swiss Super League teams			Stade de Genève
Luzern	Location of the 2025–26 Swiss Super League teams			Geneva
Capacity: 16,490	Location of the 2025–26 Swiss Super League teams			Capacity: 28,833
FC Sion	FC St. Gallen	FC Thun	(Liechtenstein) FC Vaduz	BSC Young Boys
Stade de Tourbillon	Berit Sitterstadion	Visana Stadion	Rheinpark Stadion	Stadion Wankdorf
Sion	St. Gallen	Thun	Vaduz	Bern
Capacity: 14,283	Capacity: 19,455	Capacity: 10,000	Capacity: 7,584	Capacity: 31,120

=== Personnel and kits ===
Team	Manager	Captain	Kit manufacturer	Shirt sponsor(s)	
Team	Manager	Captain	Kit manufacturer	Main	Other(s)
Basel	(Serbia) Slaviša Jokanović	(Swiss Football Association) Xherdan Shaqiri	Macron	Bitpanda	List: Front: None; Back: None; Sleeves: None; Shorts: None
Lausanne-Sport	(Swiss Football Association) Ludovic Magnin	(Swiss Football Association) Olivier Custodio	Macron	BCV	List: Front: None; Back: None; Sleeves: None; Shorts: None
Lugano	(Switzerland) Mattia Croci-Torti	(Switzerland) Renato Steffen	Erreà	Lugano's Plan B	List: Front: None; Back: None; Sleeves: None; Shorts: None
Luzern	(Switzerland) Jörg Portmann	(Germany) Pius Dorn	Erreà	Otto's	List: Front: None; Back: None; Sleeves: None; Shorts: None
Servette	(France) Jocelyn Gourvennec	(Switzerland) Jérémy Frick	Adidas	MSC	List: Front: None; Back: None; Sleeves: None; Shorts: None
Sion	(France) Didier Tholot	(Switzerland) Ali Kabacalman	Macron	Alloboissons	List: Front: None; Back: None; Sleeves: None; Shorts: None
St. Gallen	(Germany) Enrico Maaßen	(Germany) Lukas Görtler	Puma	St. Galler Kantonalbank	List: Front: None; Back: None; Sleeves: None; Shorts: None
Thun	(Switzerland) Gian Luca Privitelli	(Switzerland) Marco Bürki	Macron	Visana	List: Front: None; Back: None; Sleeves: None; Shorts: None
Vaduz	(Switzerland) Marc Schneider	(Liechtenstein) Nicolas Hasler	Puma	MBPI AG	List: Front: None; Back: None; Sleeves: None; Shorts: None
Young Boys	(Switzerland) Gerardo Seoane	(Switzerland) Loris Benito	Nike	Yuh	List: Front: None; Back: None; Sleeves: None; Shorts: None
Zürich	(Switzerland) Marcel Koller	(Kosovo) Lindrit Kamberi	Castore	None	List: Front: None; Back: None; Sleeves: None; Shorts: None
Grasshopper	(Germany) Olaf Janßen	(Albania) Amir Abrashi	Adidas	ELCA Informatik	List: Front: None; Back: None; Sleeves: None; Shorts: None

=== Managerial changes ===
Team	Outgoing manager	Manner of departure	Date of departure	Position in table	Incoming manager	Date of appointment	Ref.
Luzern	(Liechtenstein Football Association) Mario Frick	End of contract	31 May 2026	Pre-season	(Swiss Football Association) Jörg Portmann	1 May 2026	
Thun	(Swiss Football Association) Mauro Lustrinelli	Resigned	26 May 2026	Pre-season	(Swiss Football Association) Gian Luca Privitelli	4 June 2026	
Zürich	(Argentine Football Association) Carlos Bernegger (interim)	End of interim spell	31 May 2026	Pre-season	(Swiss Football Association) Marcel Koller	1 June 2026	
Lausanne	(Albanian Football Federation) Migjen Basha (German Football Association) Markus Neumayr (interim)	End of interim spell	31 May 2026	Pre-season	(Football Association of Slovenia) Luka Elsner	1 June 2026	
Basel	(Swiss Football Association) Stephan Lichtsteiner	Sacked	09 September 2026	5th	(Football Association of Serbia) Slaviša Jokanović	25 September 2026	
Grasshopper	(German Football Association) Peter Zeidler	Sacked	21 September 2026	10th	(German Football Association) Olaf Janßen	3 October 2026	
Lausanne	(Football Association of Slovenia) Luka Elsner	Sacked	3 November 2026	12th	(Swiss Football Association) Ludovic Magnin	4 November 2026	

== League table ==
Pos	Team	Pld	W	D	L	GF	GA	GD	Pts	Qualification or relegation (Note: Teams play each other three times (33 matches), before the league is split into two groups (the top six and the bottom six).)
1	Lugano	14	12	1	1	38	16	+22	37	Qualification for the Champions League second qualifying round
2	Young Boys	14	9	4	1	44	27	+17	31	Qualification for the Conference League second qualifying round (Note: The 2026–27 Swiss Cup winner will qualify for the Europa League first qualifying round. If the cup winner finishes in the top three, the second Conference League berth will be passed to the fourth place team.)
3	Sion	14	9	2	3	31	18	+13	29	Qualification for the Conference League second qualifying round
4	St. Gallen	13	7	1	5	24	22	+2	22	
5	Zürich	13	6	3	4	25	26	−1	21	
6	Servette	14	5	2	7	17	18	−1	17	
7	Basel	13	4	3	6	21	25	−4	15	
8	Thun	14	4	2	8	29	40	−11	14	
9	Luzern	13	3	4	6	21	28	−7	13	
10	Grasshopper	14	2	5	7	17	31	−14	11	
11	Vaduz	13	3	1	9	24	29	−5	10	Qualification for the Relegation play-off
12	Lausanne-Sport	13	1	4	8	12	23	−11	7	Relegation to 2027–28 Swiss Challenge League

Updated to match(es) played on 21 November 2026. Source: Brack Super League - Tabelle
Rules for classification: 1) Points; 2) Goal difference; 3) Goals scored; 4) Head-to-head goal difference; 5) Head-to-head goals scored 6) Away goals scored; 7) Draw.

== Results ==
=== First and second rounds ===
Home \ Away	BAS	GCZ	LS	LUG	LUZ	SER	SIO	STG	THU	VAD	YB	ZÜR
Basel		0–0	0–1	1–3	—	—	1–2	1–3	4–2	—	—	—
Grasshopper	—		1–1	1–4	—	—	2–5	2–0	—	2–2	0–2	2–2
Lausanne-Sport	—	1–1		0–4	—	0–1	—	—	4–5	—	2–2	2–3
Lugano	2–1	2–1	—		4–0	1–0	—	4–1	—	2–1	—	5–0
Luzern	2–4	5–1	1–0	—		—	1–1	—	1–3	2–1	2–3	—
Servette	0–1	2–1	—	—	1–1		3–0	0–2	—	2–1	—	0–0
Sion	—	—	1–0	1–2	3–0	2–0		—	3–2	3–2	—	—
St. Gallen	—	—	1–0	5–0	2–2	2–1	0–3		3–4	—	—	2–1
Thun	3–3	0–1	0–0	2–3	—	2–4	—	—		—	0–6	—
Vaduz	3–0	5–2	3–1	—	—	—	0–4	2–3	1–2		—	—
Young Boys	3–3	—	—	—	3–3	3–2	4–2	2–0	3–2	4–2		3–5
Zürich	1–2	a	—	—	2–1	2–1	—	—	4–2	2–1	2–4	

Updated to match(es) played on 21 November 2026. Source: Swiss Football League
Legend: Blue = home team win; Yellow = draw; Red = away team win.
For upcoming matches, an "a" indicates there is an article about the rivalry between the two participants.
