= Felipe Dorta =

Austrian footballer

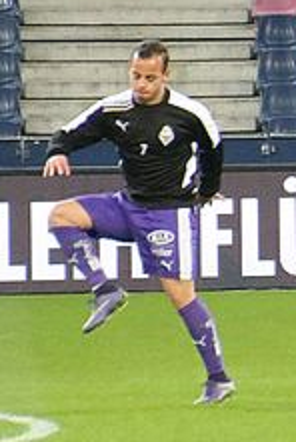

Personal information
- Full name: Felipe Martins Dorta
- Date of birth: 17 June 1996 (age 30)
- Place of birth: Erechim, Brazil
- Height: 1.70 m (5 ft 7 in)
- Positions: Left winger; attacking midfielder

Team information
- Current team: Brühl
- Number: 10

Senior career*
Years	Team	Apps	(Gls)
2012–2014	SC Rheindorf Altach	24	(1)
2014–2016	LASK	6	(1)
2014–2017	FC Pasching	32	(11)
2016	→ Austria Salzburg (loan)	14	(1)
2017	→ Wacker Innsbruck (loan)	4	(0)
2018	Athletico Paranaense	0	(0)
2018	→ CSA (loan)	0	(0)
2018–2019	Brühl	10	(2)
2019	Ansan Greeners	5	(0)
2019	Balzers	14	(5)
2020–2022	Eschen/Mauren	29	(10)
2022–	Brühl	136	(46)

International career
2014	Austria U18	3	(2)
2015	Austria U19	1	(0)
- * Club domestic league appearances and goals as of 28 September 2026

Felipe Dorta (born 17 June 1996) is a professional footballer who plays as a left winger or attacking midfielder for Swiss Promotion League club Brühl. Born in Brazil, he represented Austria at youth level.

== Club career ==
In July 2019, Dorta joined Liechtensteiner club FC Balzers after a spell with South Korean club Ansan Greeners FC. He left the club in July 2019 and joined FC Balzers.

He left Balzers at the end of 2019 and joined fellow league club USV Eschen/Mauren.

In June 2022, Dorta returned to Brühl.
