= Anouk Macheret =

Swiss footballer (born 1975)

Personal information
- Full name: Anouk Macheret Chatton
- Date of birth: 21 June 1975 (age 51)
- Place of birth: Marly, Fribourg, Switzerland
- Position: Forward

Senior career*
| Years | Team | Apps | (Gls) |
| 1994–2001 | FC Bern | | |

International career
| 1996–2001 | Switzerland | 24 | (8) |
- * Club domestic league appearances and goals

Anouk Macheret (21 June 1975) is a Swiss former footballer who was a prominent figure in Swiss women's football during the 1990s. She played as a striker, joined the FC Bern at the age of 19, and was discovered by the swiss national coach at the age of 21. She then joined the Switzerland national team and became a regular player. She retired as a footballer in 2001.

== Club career ==
Macheret began her football journey playing with boys' team in Marly (junior E), Le Mouret and Chevrilles/Tinterin. In 1994, she joined FC Bern, and then the top-tier Switzerland national team. Quickly after joining, she became a regular player for the national team and scored a goal as a striker in her first appearance. During her time, she contributed to the team's dominance, securing three league and cup doubles. Notably, she scored the opening goal in the 1996 Swiss Cup final, leading FC Bern to a decisive victory over Rapid Lugano.

== International career ==
Macheret made her international debut on May 13, 1996, against Austria, marking the occasion by scoring her first goal with the Switzerland national team. One of her international highlights was a match against Croatia in 1996, almost at her doorstep in Marly. She made a goal at the UEFA Women's EURO Qualifiers 1999 - Group 7, 1st Round, at the Köflach Stadium, when the Swiss national team was playing against Austria. In total, Anouk Macheret scored four goals for the Switzerland women's national team during the UEFA Women's EURO qualifying matches.

== Post-football career ==
After retiring from professional football in 2001, Macheret continued with her career in education, working as a schoolteacher.
