= Maeva Sarrasin =

Swiss footballer (born 1987)

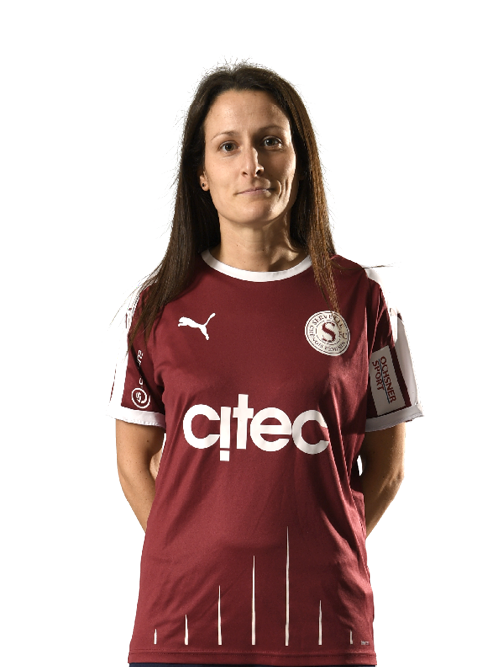

Personal information
- Full name: Maeva Sarrasin
- Date of birth: 10 June 1987 (age 39)
- Place of birth: Chêne-Bougeries, Switzerland
- Height: 1.69 m (5 ft 7 in)
- Position: Forward

Senior career*
Years	Team	Apps	(Gls)
- Chênois
2006–2014	Yverdon		
2014–	Servette		(17)

International career
- Switzerland
- * Club domestic league appearances and goals

Maeva Sarrasin (born 10 June 1987) is a Swiss football forward currently playing in the Nationalliga A for Servette. She has been a member of the Swiss national team. As a junior international she played the 2006 U-19 European Championship.
