= Lavdim Zumberi =

Swiss footballer (born 1999)

Personal information
- Date of birth: 27 November 1999 (age 26)
- Place of birth: Uzwil, Switzerland
- Height: 1.78 m (5 ft 10 in)
- Position: Attacking midfielder

Team information
- Current team: Brühl
- Number: 8

Youth career
- Bazenheid
- –2015: Wil
- 2015–2017: Zürich

Senior career*
Years	Team	Apps	(Gls)
2017–2019	Zürich U21	43	(10)
2019–2020	Zürich	6	(0)
2020–2023	Wil	69	(6)
2024	Baden	12	(0)
2024–2025	Feronikeli	22	(2)
2026–	Brühl	16	(3)

International career^{‡}
2018	Switzerland U20	1	(1)
- * Club domestic league appearances and goals as of 28 September 2026 ‡ National team caps and goals as of 19 November 2018

Lavdim Zumberi (born 27 November 1999) is a Swiss footballer who plays as an attacking midfielder for Swiss Promotion League club Brühl.

== Club career ==
=== FC Zürich ===
Zumberi started his footballing career with FC Bazenheid and later FC Wil, before moving to the academy of FC Zürich in 2015. His competitive debut for the first team was on 17 February 2019 in an away game against the BSC Young Boys. Zumberi signed his first professional contract on 22 May 2019 keeping him in Zürich until June 2022 and was permanently promoted to the first team squad. In September 2020 he moved to FC Wil where he signed a 2-year-contract.
