= SC Brühl =

Swiss football club

- Full name: Sport Club Brühl
- Founded: 1901; 125 years ago
- Ground: Paul-Grüninger-Stadion; St. Gallen, Switzerland
- Capacity: 4,200 (900 seated)
- Chairman: Christoph Zoller
- Manager: Denis Sonderegger
- League: Promotion League
- 2025-26: 2nd of 18
Home colours	Away colours

Sportclub Brühl St. Gallen, commonly known as SC Brühl is a football club based in St. Gallen, Switzerland. The team competes in the Promotion League, the third tier of Swiss football.

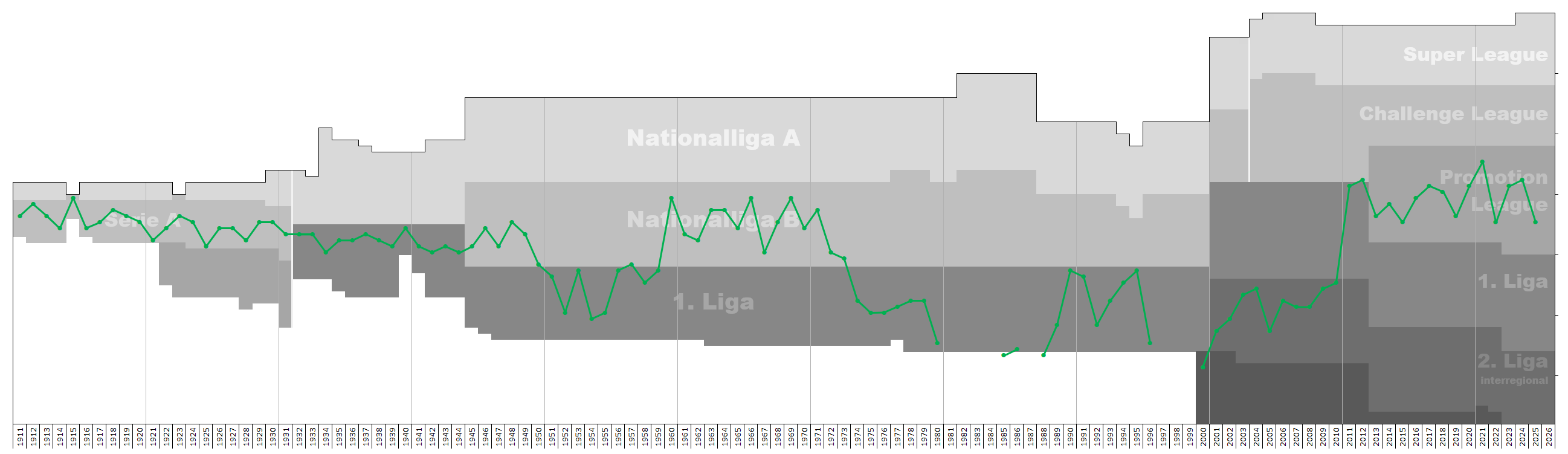
Chart of SC Brühl table positions in the Swiss football league system

== History ==
SC Brühl was founded in 1901.

In 1915, the club became Swiss champions and is the club's only major honour to date.

== Players ==
=== Current squad ===
As of 22 September 2026

Note: Flags indicate national team as defined under FIFA eligibility rules; some limited exceptions apply. Players may hold more than one non-FIFA nationality.

No.	Pos.	Nation	Player
1	GK	SUI	Nikola Rakic
5	DF	SUI	Fuad Rahimi
7	DF	SUI	Sanijel Kucani
8	MF	SUI	Lavdim Zumberi
9	FW	SUI	Metin Bahtiyari
10	FW	AUT	Felipe Dorta
11	MF	SUI	Fabio Lymann
12	DF	SUI	Jan Wörnhard
13	DF	SUI	Fabian Stöber
14	MF	SUI	Dario Stadler
15	DF	SUI	Amir Abdiji
17	MF	SUI	Tunahan Cicek (captain)

No.	Pos.	Nation	Player
18	FW	AUT	Nico Grabic
20	MF	SUI	David Mištrafović
21	MF	ITA	Gioele Parente
22	MF	KOS	Rafet Baralija
23	GK	SUI	Calvin Heim
24	MF	SUI	Aadil Alleheri
25	GK	SUI	Christoph Gschwend
27	MF	ITA	Gabriele Razzetti
28	DF	LIE	Lars Traber
30	MF	SUI	Samet Çiçek
51	FW	SUI	Momodou Jaiteh

== Staff and board members ==
- Trainer: (Switzerland) Denis Sonderegger
- Assistant Trainer: Alex DeFreitas
- Assistant Trainer: Pietro Minneci
- Goalkeeper Coach: Daniel Manser
- Fitness Coach: Marcel Alder

== Honours ==
- Swiss Serie A
  - Champions (1): 1914–15
