= Sina Cavelti =

Swiss association football player

Personal information
- Date of birth: 7 June 1998 (age 28)
- Height: 1.69 m (5 ft 7 in)
- Position: Forward

Team information
- Current team: FC St. Gallen 1879
- ‡ National team caps and goals as of 21 July 2023

Sina Cavelti (born 7 June 1998) is a Swiss footballer who plays for FC St. Gallen 1879.
