= Swiss Women's Super League =

Women's Super League
- Founded: 24 April 1970; 56 years ago as Nationalliga A 2020; 6 years ago as Super League
- Country: Switzerland
- Confederation: UEFA
- Number of clubs: 10
- Level on pyramid: 1
- Relegation to: Nationalliga B
- Domestic cup: Swiss Cup
- International cup: UEFA Champions League
- Current champions: BSC YB Frauen (12th title) (2024–25)
- Most championships: FC Zürich Frauen (24 titles)
- Website: Official website
- Current: 2026–27 Women's Super League

The Women's Super League is the highest-level league competition for women's football clubs in Switzerland. It was established in 1970 (formerly named Nationalliga A).

League winners qualify for the UEFA Women's Champions League. The team that end as number 10 relegate to the Nationalliga B.

The Super League replaced the Nationalliga A as the highest level of women's football in Switzerland from 2020–21 onwards.

== History ==
The founder and first president was Ursula Moser. On 24 April 1970, the Schweizerische Damenfussball-Liga (SDFL), today's Nationalliga A, was founded. A year earlier, the clubs of Yverdon, Serrières, Sainte-Croix, Boudry, La-Chaux-de-Fonds and Sion had merged to form the Association Romande de Football Féminin (ARFF). The first unofficial championship in French-speaking Switzerland in 1969/70 was won by DFC Sion. The Swiss Women's Football League initially consisted of 18 clubs divided into three regions. The first official champion was DFC Aarau. In 1975, the Swiss Cup was launched. The first cup winner was DFC Sion. On 15 May 1993, the decision was made to integrate the clubs into the Swiss Football Association.

== Women's Super League teams 2024–25 ==
Location of the 2022–23 Women's Super League teams

Club	Location	Stadium	Manager	2023–24 finish
FC Aarau Frauen	Aarau	Sportanlage Schachen	Charles Grütter	Playoffs: Quarter-Final
FC Basel Frauen	Basel	LA-Stadion St.Jakob	Katja Greulich	Playoffs: Semifinal
Grasshopper Club Zürich	Niederhasli	GC/Campus	Anne Pochert	Playoffs: Semifinal
FC Luzern Frauen	Lucerne	Stadion Allmend	Urs Bachmann	Playoffs: Quarter-Final
FC Rapperswil-Jona	Jona	Grünfeld Platz 2	Leandro Simonelli	2nd Nationalliga B (promoted)
Servette FC Chênois Féminin	Geneva	Stade des Trois-Chêne	José Barcala	Playoffs: Champions
FC St.Gallen Frauen	St. Gallen	Espenmoos	Marisa Wunderlin	Playoffs: Quarter-Final
FC Thun	Thun	Stadion Lachen - Platz 2	Roland Getzmann	
BSC YB Frauen	Bern	Kunstrasenfeld Wyler	Imke Wübbenhorst	Playoffs: Semi-Finals
FC Zürich Frauen	Zürich	Stadion Heerenschürli	Jacqueline Dünker	Playoffs: Runner-Up

== Format ==
Starting with the 2010–11 season, a play-off system was adopted. After the regular season, where the teams play each other twice, the top 8 teams play a final round which decides the champion. The two last placed teams and the winners of both Nationalliga B play each other twice. The top 2 teams of that group will stay in the Nationalliga A with the bottom 2 playing in next season's Nationalliga B. Tiebreakers in the playoffs are points and then better regular season standings.

From the 2017–18 season the league was reduced from 10 to 8 teams to increase competitiveness. The eight teams play each other four times. The leading team then is champion.

Even if there were plenty of formats through the years, 2021–22 was the first season in Swiss football history that was decided by playoffs. The completely new format was introduced mainly due to promotional reasons. The number of teams was increased to 10 again. They all face each other twice in a home and an away game. The table after these 22 games is the base for the playoff-quarterfinals where the 1st ranked team plays the 8th, the 2nd against the 7th, the 3rd against 6th and the 4th against the 5th. The 9th and 10th ranked play a relegation league against the two best teams from Nationalliga B. The better two qualify for next season's Super League, the other two will play in the second division.

All duels of the playoff, relegation, and classification matches are played with one first and one second leg game at each team's home ground. Only the playoff-final is a one-off game that takes place on a neutral ground.

== League Champions ==
The list of all champions:

- 1971: DFC Aarau
- 1972: DFC Aarau
- 1973: DFC Aarau
- 1974: DFC Aarau
- 1975: DFC Alpnach
- 1976: DFC Sion
- 1977: DFC Sion
- 1978: DFC Bern
- 1979: DFC Bern
- 1980: SV Seebach Zürich
- 1981: SV Seebach Zürich
- 1982: SV Seebach Zürich
- 1983: SV Seebach Zürich
- 1984: DFC Bern
- 1985: SV Seebach Zürich
- 1986: DFC Bern
- 1987: SV Seebach Zürich
- 1988: SV Seebach Zürich
- 1989: FC Rapid Lugano
- 1990: SV Seebach Zürich
- 1991: SV Seebach Zürich
- 1992: DFC Bern
- 1993: SV Seebach Zürich
- 1994: SV Seebach Zürich
- 1995. FFC Bern
- 1996: FFC Bern
- 1997: FFC Bern
- 1998: SV Seebach Zürich
- 1999: FC Schwerzenbach
- 2000: FFC Bern
- 2001: FFC Bern
- 2002: FC Sursee
- 2003: FC Sursee
- 2004: FC Sursee
- 2005: SC LUwin.ch Luzern
- 2006: SC LUwin.ch Luzern
- 2007: FFC Zuchwil 05
- 2008: FFC Zürich Seebach
- 2009: FC Zürich Frauen
- 2010: FC Zürich Frauen
- 2011: BSC YB Frauen
- 2012: FC Zürich Frauen
- 2013: FC Zürich Frauen
- 2014: FC Zürich Frauen
- 2015: FC Zürich Frauen
- 2016: FC Zürich Frauen
- 2017: FC Neunkirch
- 2018: FC Zürich Frauen
- 2019: FC Zürich Frauen
- 2020: abandoned due to COVID-19 pandemic in Switzerland
- 2021: Servette
- 2022: FC Zürich Frauen
- 2023: FC Zürich Frauen
- 2024: Servette
- 2025: BSC YB Frauen

== Performance by club ==
- 24 Titles: FC Zürich Frauen (incl. FFC Zürich Seebach and SV Seebach Zürich)
- 12 Titles: YB Frauen (incl. FFC Bern and DFC Bern)
- 5 Titles: SC LUwin.ch Luzern (incl. FC Sursee)
- 4 Titles: DFC Aarau
- 2 Titles: DFC Sion, Servette
- 1 Title: DFC Alpnach, FC Rapid Lugano, FC Schwerzenbach, FFC Zuchwil 05, FC Neunkirch

== Top scorers ==
The record for most goals in a season was set by German Inka Grings in 2012/13. She surpassed the previous record of Vanessa Bürki with 28 in 2003/04.

The latest topscorers were:

Season	Topscorer	Club	Goals
1998–99	(Italy) Maria Macri	FCF Rapid Lugano	18
1999–00	(Switzerland) Anouk Macheret	FC Bern	17
2000–01	(Switzerland) Sylvie Gaillard	FC Bern	21
2001–02	(Switzerland) Monica Di Fonzo (Switzerland) Corina Theiler	FC Sursee; FC Bern	22
2002–03	(Switzerland) Monica Di Fonzo	FC Sursee	25
2003–04	(Switzerland) Vanessa Bürki	FC Zuchwil	28
2004–05	(Switzerland) Isabelle Meyer	SC LUwin	19
2005–06	(Switzerland) Vanessa Bürki	FFC Zuchwil 05	23
2006–07	(Croatia) Kristina Šundov	FFC Zuchwil 05	18
2007–08	(Switzerland) Veronica Maglia	FFC Bern	18
2008–09	(Switzerland) Ana-Maria Crnogorčević	FC Thun	24
2009–10	(Switzerland) Caroline Abbé (Switzerland) Isabelle Meyer	FC Yverdon Féminin; Grasshopper Club	14
2010–11	(Switzerland) Veronica Maglia	BSC Young Boys	24
2011–12	(Switzerland) Nadja Hegglin	SC Kriens	27
2012–13	(Germany) Inka Grings	FC Zürich Frauen	38
2013–14	(Switzerland) Fabienne Humm	FC Zürich Frauen	19
2014–15	(Switzerland) Patricia Willi	FC St. Gallen Frauen	17
2015–16	(Switzerland) Fabienne Humm	FC Zürich Frauen	18
2016–17	(Italy) Valentina Bergamaschi	FC Neunkirch	20
2017–18	(Germany) Eunice Beckmann (Switzerland) Caroline Müller (Switzerland) Patricia Willi	FC Basel Frauen; Grasshopper Club Zürich; FC Zürich Frauen	25
2018–19	(Switzerland) Irina Pando (United States) Cara Curtin (Switzerland) Fabienne Humm (Albania) Kristina Maksuti (Switzerland) Maeva Sarrasin	FC Luzern Frauen; FF Lugano; FC Zürich Frauen; FF Lugano; Servette FC	17
2019–20	abandoned due to COVID-19 pandemic in Switzerland		
2020–21	(Switzerland) Stefanie de Além da Eira	BSC Young Boys	23
2021–22	(Switzerland) Sina Cavelti	FC Luzern	17
2022–23	(Switzerland) Fabienne Humm; Natalia Padilla-Bidas	FC Zürich Frauen; Servette FC	21
2023–24	(United States) Courtney Strode	BSC Young Boys	14
2024–25	(United States) Courtney Strode (Switzerland) Stephanie Waeber	BSC Young Boys (2)	10
