= BSC YB Frauen =

YB Frauen
- Full name: Berner Sport Club Young Boys Frauen
- Founded: 1970
- Ground: Stadion Neufeld, Bern
- Capacity: 14,000
- Chairman: Werner Müller
- Manager: Rolf Kirchhofer
- League: Swiss Women's Super League
- 2025–26: Swiss Women's Super League 2nd of 10
- Website: https://www.bscyb.ch/frauen
Home colours	Away colours

BSC YB Frauen is a Swiss women's football team representing BSC Young Boys in the Nationalliga A.

Founded in 1970 as women's division of FC Bern, it is the second most successful team in the championship with 11 titles between 1978 and 2011, and the most successful team in the national Cup with 15 trophies, including 8 titles in a row between 1994 and 2001. This last year saw FC Bern win the last of its 7 doubles to date and become the first Swiss team to take part in the UEFA Women's Cup. However, the 2000s proved less fruitful, and Bern wasn't able to win any titles. In 2009 the club was absorbed by Young Boys, taking its current name, and two years later it ended its decade-long unlucky streak winning its 11th Nationalliga trophy.

== Honours ==
- 12 Swiss Leagues (1978, 1979, 1984, 1986, 1992, 1995 — 1997, 2000, 2001, 2011, 2024–25)
- 15 Swiss Cups (1978, 1980, 1982 — 1985, 1991, 1994 — 2001)

=== Record in UEFA competitions ===
Season	Competition	Stage	Result	Opponent
2001–02	UEFA Women's Cup	Group Stage	0–4	(England) Arsenal
2001–02	UEFA Women's Cup	Group Stage	3–1	(Poland) Wrocław
2001–02	UEFA Women's Cup	Group Stage	7–0	(Israel) Hapoel Tel Aviv
2011–12	Champions League	Qualifying Stage	3–1	(North Macedonia) Naše Taksi
2011–12	Champions League	Qualifying Stage	7–0	(Moldova) Goliador Chişinău
2011–12	Champions League	Qualifying Stage	1–1	(Greece) PAOK
2011–12	Champions League	Round of 32	0–3 1–2	(Denmark) Fortuna Hjørring
2025–26	Champions League	Qualifying Stage	1–0	(Cyprus) Apollon Ladies
2025–26	Champions League	Qualifying Stage	0–1	(Denmark) Fortuna Hjørring
2025–26	Europa Cup	Qualifying Stage	2–0 1–0	(Bosnia and Herzegovina) SFK 2000
2025–26	Europa Cup	Round of 16	3–0 0–4	(Czech Republic) Sparta Prague

== Current squad ==
As of 7 July 2026

Note: Flags indicate national team as defined under FIFA eligibility rules; some limited exceptions apply. Players may hold more than one non-FIFA nationality.

No.	Pos.	Nation	Player
1	GK	LIE	Jara Ackermann
8	MF	SUI	Noa Münger
11	MF	SUI	Stéphanie Waeber (captain)
13	FW	SUI	Malaurie Granges
17	FW	SUI	Ramona Bachmann
18	DF	GER	Wibke Meister
19	MF	SUI	Audrey Remy
24	FW	GER	Lisa Josten
26	DF	SUI	Laura Frey
27	GK	SUI	Tamara Biedermann
29	FW	SUI	Jana Kohler

No.	Pos.	Nation	Player
31	DF	SUI	Giulia Schlup
39	GK	FIN	Iina Rautiainen
—	DF	SUI	Caterina Tramezzani
—	MF	GER	Carla Schwarz
—	MF	GRE	Georgia Chalatsogianni
—	FW	SUI	Selina Ueltschi
—	FW	SUI	Céline Schmid
—	FW	SUI	Géraldine Ess
—	DF	ESP	María Jiménez
—	FW	BIH	Maja Jelčić

=== Former players ===
- Wielle Douma
