= Liechtenstein women's national football team results =

This is an all-time list of the Liechtenstein women's national football team results.

== Results ==
=== 2021 ===
11 April International friendly	Liechtenstein	1–2	Luxembourg	Eschen, Liechtenstein
	Gerner 35'	Report (LFV); Report (SW)	Estevez Garcia 46'; Marques Abreu 60'	Stadium: Sportpark Eschen-Mauren; Attendance: 0 Referee: Simona Ghisletta (Switzerland)

24 June International friendly	Liechtenstein	4–1	Gibraltar	Ruggell, Liechtenstein
	Göppel 3', 53'; Gerner 29'; Tschupp 66'	Report (LFV); Report (SW)	Robba 75'	Stadium: Freizeitpark Widau; Attendance: 111; Referee: Michèle Schmölzer (Switzerland)

27 June International friendly	Liechtenstein	2–1	Gibraltar	Ruggell, Liechtenstein
	Gerner 40'; Batliner 45'	Report (LFV); Report (SW)	Gilbert 50'	Stadium: Freizeitpark Widau; Attendance: 200; Referee: Simona Ghisletta (Switzerland)

18 September International friendly	Liechtenstein	2–4	Andorra	Triesen, Liechtenstein
	Vogt 41'; Müssner 68'	Report (LFV)	Morató 6', 26' (pen.), 36'; Gonçalves 60'	Stadium: Sportanlage Blumenau; Attendance: 150; Referee: Michèle Schmölzer (Switzerland)

26 November International friendly	Gibraltar	1–0	Liechtenstein	Gibraltar
	Pizzarello 83'	Report (LFV)		Stadium: Victoria Stadium; Referee: Lorraine Watson (Scotland)

29 November International friendly	Gibraltar	2–3	Liechtenstein	Gibraltar
	Robba 45+2'; Gilbert 85' (pen.)	Report (LFV)	Vogt 19'; Müssner 29'; Stampfli 82'	Stadium: Victoria Stadium; Referee: Sandra Baros (Portugal)

=== 2022 ===
3 September International friendly	Andorra	3–1	Liechtenstein	Andorra la Vella, Andorra
	Fernández 53'; Tizón 79'; Ruzafa 90+2' (pen.)	Report	Fasel 31'	Stadium: Center FAF

6 October International friendly	Cyprus	5–0	Liechtenstein	Larnaca, Cyprus
	Chrysostomou 13'; Violari 32'; Freda 55', 56'; Lohner 64' (o.g.)	Report (LFV)		Stadium: GSZ Stadium; Attendance: 40; Referee: Ioanna Allayiotou (Cyprus)

9 October International friendly	Cyprus	2–1	Liechtenstein	Larnaca, Cyprus
	Freda 45+2'; Violari 85'	Report; Report (LFV)	Vogt 45'	Stadium: GSZ Stadium; Attendance: 50; Referee: Zoe Stavrou (Cyprus)

=== 2023 ===
13 July International friendly	Kosovo	4–0	Liechtenstein	Hajvalia, Kosovo
	Memeti 42'; Kastrati 59' (pen.); Biqkaj 63' (pen.); Shala 88' (pen.)	Report (Soccerway) Report (LFV)		Stadium: FFK National Educational Camp; Attendance: 150; Referee: Emanuela Rusta (Albania)

16 July International friendly	Kosovo	2–0	Liechtenstein	Hajvalia, Kosovo
	Halilaj 75'; Ramadani 80'	Report (Soccerway) Report (LFV)		Stadium: FFK National Educational Camp; Attendance: 40; Referee: Emanuela Rusta (Albania)

=== 2024 ===
22 February International friendly	Gibraltar	2–3	Liechtenstein	Gibraltar
	Olivero 38'; Gilbert 90+3'	Report (LFV)	Risch 15'; Fasel 45+1'; Göppel 74'	Stadium: Victoria Stadium; Attendance: 150; Referee: Catarina Campos (Portuguese Football Federation)

25 February International friendly	Gibraltar	1–1	Liechtenstein	Gibraltar
	Gilbert 51'	Report (LFV)	Hürlimann 15'	Stadium: Victoria Stadium; Attendance: 300; Referee: Teresa Oliveira (Portuguese Football Federation)

11 July International friendly	Liechtenstein	1–1	Namibia	Ruggell, Liechtenstein
17:00	Stampfli 78'	Report (FIFA) Report (LFV)	Amukoto 14'	Stadium: Freizeitpark Widau; Attendance: 200; Referee: Deborah Anex (Switzerland)

14 July International friendly	Liechtenstein	0–2	Namibia	Ruggell, Liechtenstein
09:00		Report (FIFA) Report (LFV)	Kahiriri 22'; Ngonda 37'	Stadium: Freizeitpark Widau; Attendance: 300; Referee: Désirée Grundbacher (Switzerland)

=== 2025 ===
21 February 2025 UEFA Nations League group stage	Armenia	6–1	Liechtenstein	Armavir, Armenia
	Artin 7'; Pizlova 13'; Kazandjian 44', 53', 71'; Dallakyan 51' (pen.)	Report (UEFA) Report (LFV)	Risch 52'	Stadium: Armavir City Stadium; Referee: Tjaša Misja (Slovenia)

25 February 2025 UEFA Nations League group stage	Luxembourg	7–0	Liechtenstein	Esch-sur-Alzette, Luxembourg
	Jorge 16', 39'; Thompson 44'; Estévez García 48' (pen.); Barbosa Abreu 68'; Miller 75'; C. Schmit 87'	Report (UEFA)		Stadium: Stade Emile Mayrisch; Referee: Jeļena Jermolajeva (Latvia)

4 April 2025 UEFA Nations League group stage	Liechtenstein	0–4	Kazakhstan	Eschen, Liechtenstein
17:30		Report	Nurusheva 5', 36' (pen.); Berikova 26'; Bibossynova 90+4'	Stadium: Sportpark Eschen-Mauren; Attendance: 412; Referee: Mariia Glekova (Israel)

8 April 2025 UEFA Nations League group stage	Liechtenstein	2–3	Luxembourg	Eschen, Liechtenstein
17:30	Risch 31'; Kindle 61'	Report	Thompson 11', 14'; Jorge 77'	Stadium: Sportpark Eschen-Mauren; Attendance: 384; Referee: Anastasiya Romanyuk (Ukraine)

30 May 2025 UEFA Nations League group stage	Kazakhstan	4–0	Liechtenstein	Almaty, Kazakhstan
14:00 UTC+5	Berikova 44', 55'; Turlybekova 46'; Zhanatayeva 57'	Report		Stadium: Almaty Central Stadium; Attendance: 282; Referee: Anna Adamska (POL) (Poland)

3 June 2025 UEFA Nations League group stage	Liechtenstein	2–2	Armenia	Eschen, Liechtenstein
19:00	Hürlimann 5'; Göppel 61'	Report	Dallakyan 10'; Davtyan 89'	Stadium: Sportpark Eschen-Mauren; Attendance: 423; Referee: Abbie Hendry (Scotland)

29 November Friendly	Liechtenstein	1–4	Hong Kong	Eschen, Liechtenstein
14:00	Hürlimann 90+3'	Report	Leung H.K. 45', 54', 83' (pen.); Wong T.K. 90+1'	Stadium: Sportpark Eschen-Mauren; Attendance: 170; Referee: Déborah Anex (Switzerland)

=== 2026 ===
3 March 2027 FIFA Women's World Cup qualification	Liechtenstein	1–6	Lithuania	Vaduz, Liechtenstein
	Risch 30'	Report	Jonušaitė 3', 64', 77', 83'; Lazdauskaitė 43'; Petrauskaitė 90+1'	Stadium: Rheinpark Stadion; Attendance: 604; Referee: Teresa Oliveira (Portugal)

7 March 2027 FIFA Women's World Cup qualification	Bosnia and Herzegovina	13–1	Liechtenstein	Zenica, Bosnia and Herzegovina
	Milinković 6'; Frick 9' (o.g.); Hamzić 43'; Nikolić 17', 31'; M. Hasanbegović 24'; Ekić 33', 35'; Aleksić 45' (pen.); Grebenar 45+3'; Gačanica 58'; Rankić 66' (pen.); Crnoja 83' (pen.)	Report	Göppel 13'	Stadium: Bosnia and Herzegovina FA Training Centre; Attendance: 100; Referee: Asen Albayrak (Turkey)

14 April 2027 FIFA Women's World Cup qualification	Estonia	2–1	Liechtenstein	Tallinn, Estonia
17:00 (18:00 UTC+3)	Kubassova 44' (pen.); Kirpu 84'	Report (UEFA)	Steck 50'	Stadium: Lilleküla Stadium; Attendance: 502; Referee: Rita Vehapi (Kosovo)

18 April 2027 FIFA Women's World Cup qualification	Liechtenstein	0–6	Bosnia and Herzegovina	Vaduz, Liechtenstein
16:00		Report (FIFA); Report (UEFA)	Nikolić 5', 24', 35'; Kapetanović 6'; Milinković 9'; Ekić 64'	Stadium: Rheinpark Stadion; Attendance: 764; Referee: Frederikke Lydia Søkjær (Denmark)

5 June 2027 FIFA Women's World Cup qualification	Liechtenstein	0–5	Estonia	Vaduz, Liechtenstein
19:00		Report (FIFA); Report (UEFA)	Kubassova 6'; Kirpu 29'; Tammik 50'; Merisalu 60'; Teern 83'	Stadium: Rheinpark Stadion; Attendance: 695; Referee: Araksya Saribekyan (Armenia)

9 June 2027 FIFA Women's World Cup qualification	Lithuania	2–0	Liechtenstein	Druskininkai, Lithuania
19:00 (20:00 UTC+3)	Lazdauskaitė 7'; Vaitukaitytė 50'	Report (FIFA); Report (UEFA)		Stadium: LSC Druskininkai Stadium; Referee: Lena Hirtl (Austria)

10 October Friendly	Liechtenstein	3–0	Gibraltar	Schaan, Liechtenstein
16:00	Göppel 6', 47'; Strunk 67'	*Soccerway: LFV		Stadium: Rheinwiese Stadion; Attendance: 450; Referee: Fabienne Hofer (Austria)
