= Football in Liechtenstein =

- Country: Liechtenstein
- Governing body: Liechtenstein Football Association
- National teams: men's national team women's national team

National competitions
- Liechtenstein Football Cup

Club competitions
- Swiss Super League

International competitions
- Champions League; Europa League; Europa Conference League; Super Cup; FIFA Club World Cup; FIFA World Cup (national team); European Championship (national team); UEFA Nations League (national team)

The most popular sport in the Principality of Liechtenstein is football. Liechtenstein has no national association football league; instead, the country's seven clubs compete within the Swiss football league system. The country is represented internationally by both a men's national football team and, more recently, a women's national football team, both governed by the Liechtenstein Football Association, which was founded in 1934 and became affiliated with FIFA in 1976.

Because Liechtenstein lacks its own league, it is the only UEFA member nation without a domestic top flight. The principal domestic competition is the Liechtenstein Football Cup, established in 1945, the winners of which gain entry into UEFA Europa Conference League qualification. FC Vaduz is the dominant club in Liechtenstein football, having won 15 of the last 16 cup competitions, and currently competes in the Swiss Challenge League, the second tier of Swiss football.

The women's game was formally established in 1998 and has grown steadily, with women's clubs competing in Swiss leagues and a domestic women's league operating with four teams by 2017. Development of women's football in the country has been supported by both the Liechtenstein Football Association and FIFA.

== Men's national football team ==
In the qualification for the World Cup in Germany in 2006, they achieved two victories and two draws (2–2 against Portugal and 0–0 Slovakia). In the qualification for the EURO 2008 they gained seven points in a tough group with Spain, Sweden, Northern Ireland, Denmark, Latvia and Iceland.

== Women's national football team ==
Liechtenstein did not have a team by 2006 on either the senior or youth level. The women's national team has never competed at the Women's World Cup nor entered the European Championship for Women. The team did not play in any FIFA sanctioned matches between 1970 and the present. In 2013, President of the Liechtenstein Football Association Matthias Voigt said he was committed towards working on the creation of a women's national team, and pointed to the activity level in the women's domestic competition. Despite this comment, the federation had no staff dedicated to women's football by 2017 and also did not have a women's football committee. Inclusion of women in governance was also limited, with only one woman serving on a committee and only 5 women serving in managerial positions within the organization. Progress on the development front as a result of activities by the LFV were part of the reason that Radio Liechtenstein cited in September 2017 the time to create a senior women's national team.

Liechtenstein's U16 and U18 girls' national teams have been in existence by 2017. UEFA listed the senior national women's side as a U19 B team.

== Men's domestic football ==
Due to lack of active football teams, Liechtenstein is the only UEFA member nation not to have their own league and hence does not have any spots in the UEFA Champions League. Club sides play in the Swiss leagues, with FC Vaduz currently playing in the highest Swiss division. Between 1934 and 1937, beside the Swiss Football Association, Liechtenstein's clubs were affiliates of St. Gallen Cantonal Football Association, where they had a tournament of Liechtenstein's clubs only, that determined the Liechtenstein's Champion. FC Triesen won the competition in 1934, 1935 and 1937. Since 1945, the tiny principality has had its own cup competition, the winners of which are guaranteed entry into the Europa Conference League qualification.

FC Vaduz have become the dominant force within the Liechtenstein Football Cup, winning 15 of the last 16 competitions.

Mario Frick holds the record for most appearances and goals scored for Liechtenstein, and also played in football leagues around Europe.

Clubs in Liechtenstein can qualify for the UEFA Champions League through a technicality, with it being possible should the club win the UEFA Conference League then the UEFA Europa League back-to-back. In order to remain in the UCL, the club would need to win the competition. This is due to the complicated situation involving Liechtensteiner clubs, which participate in the Swiss leagues as guest clubs. As a result, none of the clubs can participate in UEFA competitions as a representative from Switzerland.

=== Clubs ===
Location of the seven football clubs in Liechtenstein

There are seven football teams in Liechtenstein:

Club	Current level	Stadium	Capacity
FC Balzers	5 - Swiss 2. Liga Interregional	Sportplatz Rheinau	2,000
USV Eschen/Mauren	4 - Swiss 1. Liga	Sportpark Eschen-Mauren	2,000
FC Ruggell	6 - Swiss 2. Liga	Freizeitpark Widau	500
FC Schaan	6 - Swiss 2. Liga	Sportanlage Rheinwiese	1,500
FC Triesen	7 - Swiss 3. Liga	Sportanlage Blumenau	2,100
FC Triesenberg	7 - Swiss 3. Liga	Sportanlage Leitawies	800
FC Vaduz	1 - Swiss Super League	Rheinpark Stadion	7,584

== Women's domestic football ==
Women's football officially began in the country in 1998, and faced a number of structural, population and geographic hurdles. Representatives from the country participated in a 2014 study group called "Women´s football in Iceland" as visitors. Their delegation was headed by Monika Burgmeier, along with top level women's club coaches Stefan Negele, Anton Kindle and Walter Vogt. Burgmeier presented a session called "Women’s football in Liechtenstein". The following year, the Liechtenstein Football Association formally created a program to work towards the development of women's football in the country. According to the Liechtenstein Football Association, this began to bear fruit in 2017. In September 2017, as part of a program with FIFA, kits. safety equipment and training materials were provided to 200 girls in the country to encourage their participation in the sport.

Volleyball was the most popular women's sport in the country, with football ranking in the 6th or 7th most popular in the country. By 2017, football had supplanted volleyball as the most popular women's sport. In 2006, there were 165 registered female players in the country. This represented growth from 72 players in 2000. Liechtenstein Football Association was founded in 1934, and became affiliated with FIFA in 1976. Less than 3% of the national federation's budget is earmarked for women's football, compared to 9% for men and 17% for youth. There were 283 registered female players in 2016, with a decline in 2017 to 259 registered players. 61 of these players in 2017 were 18+, while 198 were youth players. The ratio of male to female coaches was 89:11 in 2017. 4 of these women coaches were UEFA B licence holders while another 4 were National C licence holders. There was one qualified female referee in the country in 2017, and she only worked women's games. Girls played football in mixed groups as part of their organized school curriculum.

The women's version of sport had developed enough that there were two women's club sides, FC Ruggell and Triesen/Balzers who had played in Nationalliga B Women in Switzerland. FC Ruggell was active in 2008 while Triesen/Balzers was active in 2014. Playing in Switzerland is the norm for most women's clubs in the country as a result of the size of their population and its location. There is also an active women's league supported by the Liechtenstein Football Association. It had 4 teams in 2017. The league was not professional, with all the players being domestic ones. Average attendance at league matches was 30 people in 2017.

== Attendances ==
The football club from Liechtenstein with the highest average home attendance per league season:

Season	Club	Average
2024-25	FC Vaduz	1,334
2023-24	FC Vaduz	1,516
2022-23	FC Vaduz	1,491
