= Liechtenstein women's national football team =

Women's national association football team representing Liechtenstein

Liechtenstein
- Nickname(s): Blau-Rot (The Blue-Reds)
- Association: Liechtenstein Football Association (Liechtensteiner Fussballverband)
- Confederation: UEFA (Europe)
- Head coach: Adrienne Krysl
- Captain: Sophia Hürlimann
- Most caps: Julia Benneckenstein (26)
- Top scorer: Lena Göppel (7)
- Home stadium: Rheinwiese Schaan
- FIFA code: LIE
| First colours | Second colours | Third colours |

FIFA ranking
- Current: 190 (16 June 2026)
- Highest: 187 (August 2024)
- Lowest: 191 (December 2025)

First international
- Liechtenstein 1–2 Luxembourg (Eschen, Liechtenstein; 11 April 2021)

Biggest win
- Liechtenstein 4–1 Gibraltar (Ruggell, Liechtenstein; 24 June 2021); Liechtenstein 3–0 Gibraltar (Schaan, Liechtenstein; 10 October 2026)

Biggest defeat
- Bosnia and Herzegovina 13–1 Liechtenstein (Zenica, Bosnia and Herzegovina; 7 March 2026)
- Website: lfv.li

The Liechtenstein women's national football team (German: Liechtensteinische Fussballnationalmannschaft) is the national women's football team of the Principality of Liechtenstein and is controlled by the Liechtenstein Football Association. The organisation is known as the Liechtensteiner Fussballverband in German. The team's first match was an unofficial friendly against FFC Vorderland in Triesen, Liechtenstein, a 2–3 defeat in June 2019. Their first official match was on 11 April 2021, a 2–1 defeat against Luxembourg.

== History ==
Liechtenstein did not have a women's national team by 2006 at either the senior or youth level. In 2013, President of the Liechtenstein Football Association (LIV) Matthias Voigt said he was committed to working on the creation of a women's national team, and pointed to the activity level in the women's domestic competition. Despite this comment, the federation had no staff dedicated to women's football as of 2017 and also did not have a women's football committee. Inclusion of women in governance was also limited, with only one woman serving on a committee and only five women serving in managerial positions within the organization. Progress on the development front as a result of activities by the LFV were part of the reason that Radio Liechtenstein cited in September 2017 the time to create a senior women's national team.

Liechtenstein's U16 and U18 girls' national teams had already been in existence by 2017. UEFA listed the senior national women's side as a U19 B team.

Starting line-up for first ever international.

On 11 April 2021, the team played their first official match, a 2–1 defeat against Luxembourg. Liechtenstein took the lead in the 35th minute with a goal by Viktoria Gerner, the first official goal in the team's history.

Liechtenstein entered the UEFA Women's Nations League for the first time in the 2025 edition, marking their first official competitive international tournament.

== Team image ==
=== Nicknames ===
The Liechtenstein women's national football team has been known or nicknamed as "The Blue-Reds".

=== Home stadium ===
Liechtenstein play its home matches at the Rheinwiese Schaan.

== Results and fixtures ==
The following is a list of match results in the last 12 months, as well as any future matches that have been scheduled.

Legend

Win Draw Lose Void or Postponed Fixture

=== 2025 ===
| 29 November Friendly | Liechtenstein | 1–4 | Hong Kong | Eschen, Liechtenstein |
| 14:00 | Hürlimann 90+3' | Report | Leung H.K. 45', 54', 83' (pen.); Chan T.S. 90+1' | Stadium: Sportpark Eschen-Mauren; Attendance: 170; Referee: Déborah Anex (Switzerland) |

=== 2026 ===
| 3 March 2027 FIFA Women's World Cup qualification | Liechtenstein | 1–6 | Lithuania | Vaduz, Liechtenstein |
| | Risch 30' | Report | Jonušaitė 3', 64', 77', 83'; Lazdauskaitė 43'; Petrauskaitė 90+1' | Stadium: Rheinpark Stadion; Attendance: 604; Referee: Teresa Oliveira (Portugal) |

| 7 March 2027 FIFA Women's World Cup qualification | Bosnia and Herzegovina | 13–1 | Liechtenstein | Zenica, Bosnia and Herzegovina |
| | Milinković 6'; Frick 9' (o.g.); Hamzić 43'; Nikolić 17', 31'; M. Hasanbegović 24'; Ekić 33', 35'; Aleksić 45' (pen.); Grebenar 45+3'; Gačanica 58'; Rankić 66' (pen.); Crnoja 83' (pen.) | Report | Göppel 13' | Stadium: Bosnia and Herzegovina FA Training Centre; Attendance: 100; Referee: Asen Albayrak (Turkey) |

| 14 April 2027 FIFA Women's World Cup qualification | Estonia | 2–1 | Liechtenstein | Tallinn, Estonia |
| 17:00 (18:00 UTC+3) | Kubassova 44' (pen.); Kirpu 84' | Report (UEFA) | Steck 50' | Stadium: Lilleküla Stadium; Attendance: 502; Referee: Rita Vehapi (Kosovo) |

| 18 April 2027 FIFA Women's World Cup qualification | Liechtenstein | 0–6 | Bosnia and Herzegovina | Vaduz, Liechtenstein |
| 16:00 | | Report (FIFA); Report (UEFA) | Nikolić 5', 24', 35'; Kapetanović 6'; Milinković 9'; Ekić 64' | Stadium: Rheinpark Stadion; Attendance: 764; Referee: Frederikke Lydia Søkjær (Denmark) |

| 5 June 2027 FIFA Women's World Cup qualification | Liechtenstein | 0–5 | Estonia | Vaduz, Liechtenstein |
| 19:00 | | Report (FIFA); Report (UEFA) | Kubassova 6'; Kirpu 29'; Tammik 50'; Merisalu 60'; Teern 83' | Stadium: Rheinpark Stadion; Attendance: 695; Referee: Araksya Saribekyan (Armenia) |

| 9 June 2027 FIFA Women's World Cup qualification | Lithuania | 2–0 | Liechtenstein | Druskininkai, Lithuania |
| 19:00 (20:00 UTC+3) | Lazdauskaitė 7'; Vaitukaitytė 50' | Report (FIFA); Report (UEFA) | | Stadium: LSC Druskininkai Stadium; Referee: Lena Hirtl (Austria) |

| 10 October Friendly | Liechtenstein | 3–0 | Gibraltar | Schaan, Liechtenstein |
| 16:00 | Göppel 6', 47'; Strunk 67' | *Soccerway: LFV | | Stadium: Rheinwiese Stadion; Attendance: 450; Referee: Fabienne Hofer (Austria) |

| 28 November Friendly | San Marino | v | Liechtenstein |

- Official Liechtenstein Results and Fixtures
- Liechtenstein Results and Fixtures – Soccerway.com

== All-time record ==
As of 10 October 2026
Key

Positive balance
Neutral balance
Negative balance

| Opponent | P | W | D | L | GF | GA | GD | Win % |
|---|---|---|---|---|---|---|---|---|
| Andorra | 2 | 0 | 0 | 2 | 3 | 7 | −4 | 0.00 |
| Armenia | 2 | 0 | 1 | 1 | 3 | 8 | −5 | 0.00 |
| Bosnia and Herzegovina | 2 | 0 | 0 | 2 | 1 | 19 | −18 | 0.00 |
| Cyprus | 2 | 0 | 0 | 2 | 1 | 7 | −6 | 0.00 |
| Estonia | 2 | 0 | 0 | 2 | 1 | 7 | −6 | 0.00 |
| Gibraltar | 7 | 5 | 1 | 1 | 16 | 8 | +8 | 71.43 |
| Hong Kong | 1 | 0 | 0 | 1 | 1 | 4 | −3 | 0.00 |
| Kazakhstan | 2 | 0 | 0 | 2 | 0 | 8 | −8 | 0.00 |
| Kosovo | 2 | 0 | 0 | 2 | 0 | 6 | −6 | 0.00 |
| Lithuania | 2 | 0 | 0 | 2 | 1 | 8 | −7 | 0.00 |
| Luxembourg | 3 | 0 | 0 | 3 | 3 | 12 | −9 | 0.00 |
| Namibia | 2 | 0 | 1 | 1 | 1 | 3 | −2 | 0.00 |
| Total | 29 | 5 | 3 | 21 | 31 | 97 | −66 | 17.24 |

== Coaching staff ==
=== Current coaching staff ===
As of 7 July 2024

| Position | Name |
|---|---|
| Head coach | (Switzerland) Adrienne Krysl |
| Assistant coach | (Hungary) Áron Horvath |
| Goalkeeping coach | (Switzerland) Claudio Moffa |
| Physio | (Poland) Oliwia Vetter |
| Physio | (Switzerland) Jana Elvedi |
| Team doctor | (Netherlands) Inge Liem |
| Equipment manager | (Liechtenstein) Eduard Fried |
| Team manager | (Liechtenstein) Marco Vögeli |

=== Manager history ===
- (Switzerland) Philipp Riedener (2020–2023)
- (Switzerland) Florian Holenstein (caretaker) (2023)
- (Switzerland) Adrienne Krysl (2023–)

== Players ==
=== Current squad ===
- The following players were called up for the friendly match against Gibraltar on 10 October 2026.
- Caps and goals are current as of 10 October 2026 after the match against Gibraltar.

| No. | Pos. | Player | Date of birth (age) | Caps | Goals | Club |
|---|---|---|---|---|---|---|
| | GK | Marcia Bischofberger | 17 January 2004 (age 22) | 14 | 0 | (Swiss Football Association) Wil |
| | GK | Marie Göldi | 2 January 2007 (age 19) | 1 | 0 | (Liechtenstein Football Association) Triesenberg |
| | DF | Julia Benneckenstein | 8 March 2000 (age 26) | 26 | 0 | (Swiss Football Association) Wil |
| | DF | Elena Lohner | 19 July 2001 (age 25) | 25 | 0 | (Liechtenstein Football Association) Triesen |
| | DF | Mia Hammermann | 19 March 1997 (age 29) | 18 | 0 | (Liechtenstein Football Association) Triesen |
| | DF | Sophia Blumenthal | 6 February 2002 (age 24) | 17 | 0 | (Swiss Football Association) Staad |
| | DF | Eva Beck | 25 November 1997 (age 28) | 7 | 0 | (Swiss Football Association) Oerlikon/Polizei |
| | DF | Julia Beck | 10 May 2008 (age 18) | 6 | 0 | (Liechtenstein Football Association) Triesenberg |
| | MF | Viktoria Gerner | 22 April 1989 (age 37) | 25 | 3 | (Swiss Football Association) Staad |
| | MF | Eva Fasel | 1 September 1994 (age 32) | 22 | 1 | (Liechtenstein Football Association) Triesen |
| | MF | Lena Göppel | 11 August 2001 (age 25) | 20 | 7 | (Swiss Football Association) Basel |
| | MF | Katharina Risch | 9 November 2004 (age 21) | 18 | 4 | (Swiss Football Association) St. Gallen |
| | MF | Salomé Stampfli | 9 June 2005 (age 21) | 16 | 2 | (Austrian Football Association) Altach |
| | MF | Valennia Göldi | 2 January 2007 (age 19) | 6 | 0 | (Liechtenstein Football Association) Triesenberg |
| | MF | Enya Strunk | 5 December 2009 (age 16) | 3 | 1 | (Swiss Football Association) St. Gallen |
| | MF | Julia Suhner | 14 May 2008 (age 18) | 2 | 0 | (Liechtenstein Football Association) Triesen |
| | MF | Lilly Falk | 11 December 2007 (age 18) | 0 | 0 | (Liechtenstein Football Association) Triesen |
| | FW | Joy Steck | 18 August 2003 (age 23) | 7 | 1 | (Swiss Football Association) Aarau |
| | FW | Lia Hermann | 26 June 2005 (age 21) | 6 | 0 | (Austrian Football Association) Altach |

=== Recent call-ups ===
- The following players were called up in the last 12 months.

| Pos. | Player | Date of birth (age) | Caps | Goals | Club | Latest call-up |
|---|---|---|---|---|---|---|
| GK | Irina Wohlwend | 11 September 2009 (age 17) | 0 | 0 | (Liechtenstein) Ruggell | v. Lithuania, 9 June 2026 |
| GK | Lara Loos | 20 September 2004 (age 22) | 1 | 0 | (Liechtenstein) Triesen | v. Bosnia and Herzegovina, 18 April 2026 |
| DF | Sophia Hürlimann (captain) | 30 March 2000 (age 26) | 25 | 3 | (Switzerland) Winterthur | v. Lithuania, 9 June 2026 |
| DF | Sina Kollmann | 12 May 2003 (age 23) | 23 | 0 | (Liechtenstein) Triesen | v. Lithuania, 9 June 2026 |
| DF | Vanessa Wenger | 19 April 2009 (age 17) | 4 | 0 | (Switzerland) Thun | v. Lithuania, 9 June 2026 |
| DF | Flavia Scherrer | 13 November 2005 (age 20) | 4 | 0 | (Switzerland) Mels | v. Bosnia and Herzegovina, 18 April 2026 |
| DF | Iman Abidi | 12 January 2004 (age 22) | 1 | 0 | (Liechtenstein) Triesen | v. Hong Kong, 29 November 2025 |
| MF | Elis Eiler | 13 August 1990 (age 36) | 13 | 0 | (Switzerland) Staad | v. Lithuania, 9 June 2026 |
| MF | Camilla Kind | 24 December 2003 (age 22) | 6 | 0 | (Liechtenstein) Triesen | v. Lithuania, 9 June 2026 |
| MF | Felicia Frick | 13 November 2003 (age 22) | 19 | 0 | (United States) Carson–Newman University | v. Bosnia and Herzegovina, 18 April 2026 |
| MF | Isabelle Wiebach | 14 June 1994 (age 32) | 11 | 0 | (Liechtenstein) Triesen | v. Armenia, 3 June 2025 |
| FW | Anika Wohlwend | 11 September 2009 (age 17) | 1 | 0 | (Switzerland) St. Gallen | v. Lithuania, 9 June 2026 |
| FW | Naomi Kindle | 13 October 2001 (age 24) | 10 | 1 | (Liechtenstein) Triesen | v. Bosnia and Herzegovina, 18 April 2026 |
| FW | Melina Meyer | 13 November 1996 (age 29) | 5 | 0 | (Liechtenstein) Triesen | v. Bosnia and Herzegovina, 18 April 2026 |
| FW | Dorentina Marina | 24 August 2006 (age 20) | 1 | 0 | (Liechtenstein) Triesen | v. Bosnia and Herzegovina, 18 April 2026 |
| FW | Shania Vogt^{RET} | 15 February 1999 (age 27) | 19 | 3 | (Switzerland) Staad | v. Hong Kong, 29 November 2025 |

Notes:

- PRE = Preliminary squad
- INJ = Injured
- RET = Player has retired from the national team

=== Captains ===
- Viktoria Gerner (2021–2025)
- Sophia Hürlimann (2025–)

== Records ==
Source: LFV Statistics

As of 10 October 2026
Players in bold are still active and available for selection.

=== Most capped players ===
| Rank | Player | Caps | Goals | Years |
|---|---|---|---|---|
| 1 | **Julia Benneckenstein** | 26 | 0 | 2021– |
| 2 | **Sophia Hürlimann** | 25 | 2 | 2021– |
| 2 | **Viktoria Gerner** | 25 | 3 | 2021– |
| 2 | **Elena Lohner** | 25 | 0 | 2021– |
| 5 | **Sina Kollmann** | 23 | 0 | 2021– |
| 6 | **Eva Fasel** | 22 | 1 | 2021– |
| 7 | **Lena Göppel** | 20 | 7 | 2021– |
| 8 | Shania Vogt | 19 | 3 | 2021–2025 |
| 8 | **Felicia Frick** | 19 | 0 | 2021– |
| 10 | **Katharina Risch** | 18 | 4 | 2023– |
| 10 | **Mia Hammermann** | 18 | 0 | 2021– |

=== Top goalscorers ===
| # | Player | Caps | Goals | Ratio | Career |
|---|---|---|---|---|---|
| 1 | **Lena Göppel** | 20 | 7 | 0.35 | 2021– |
| 2 | **Katharina Risch** | 18 | 4 | 0.22 | 2023– |
| 3 | Shania Vogt | 19 | 3 | 0.16 | 2021–2025 |
| 3 | **Viktoria Gerner** | 25 | 3 | 0.12 | 2021– |
| 3 | **Sophia Hürlimann** | 25 | 3 | 0.13 | 2021– |
| 6 | Fiona Batliner | 10 | 2 | 0.2 | 2021–2023 |
| 6 | **Christina Müssner** | 11 | 2 | 0.18 | 2021– |
| 6 | **Salomé Stampfli** | 16 | 2 | 0.13 | 2021– |
| 9 | **Enya Strunk** | 3 | 1 | 0.33 | 2026– |
| 9 | **Joy Steck** | 7 | 1 | 0.14 | 2026– |
| 9 | **Naomi Kindle** | 10 | 1 | 0.1 | 2021– |
| 9 | **Katharina Tschupp** | 10 | 1 | 0.1 | 2021– |
| 9 | **Eva Fasel** | 22 | 1 | 0.05 | 2021– |

== Competitive record ==
=== FIFA Women's World Cup ===
| FIFA Women's World Cup record | | | | | | | | Qualification record | | | | | | |
| Year | Result | P | W | D | L | GF | GA | P | W | D | L | GF | GA | GD |
|---|---|---|---|---|---|---|---|---|---|---|---|---|---|---|
| (China); 1991 to (France); 2019 | Team did not exist | | | | | | | Team did not exist | | | | | | |
| (Australia) (New Zealand); 2023 | Did not enter | | | | | | | Did not enter | | | | | | |
| (Brazil); 2027 | Did not qualify | | | | | | | 6 | 0 | 0 | 6 | 3 | 34 | −31 |
| (Costa Rica) (Jamaica) (Mexico) (United States); 2031 | To be determined | | | | | | | To be determined | | | | | | |
| (United Kingdom); 2035 | To be determined | | | | | | | To be determined | | | | | | |
| Total | 0/4 | | | | | | | | | | | | | |

=== UEFA Women's Championship ===
| UEFA Women's Championship record | | | | | | | | Qualification record | | | | | |
| Year | Result | P | W | D | L | GF | GA | P | W | D | L | GF | GA |
|---|---|---|---|---|---|---|---|---|---|---|---|---|---|
| (Europe); 1984 to (Netherlands); 2017 | Team did not exist | | | | | | | Team did not exist | | | | | |
| (England); 2022 | Did not enter | | | | | | | Did not enter | | | | | |
| (Switzerland); 2025 | Did not enter | | | | | | | Did not enter | | | | | |
| (Germany); 2029 | To be determined | | | | | | | To be determined | | | | | |
| Total | 0/3 | | | | | | | | | | | | |

=== UEFA Women's Nations League ===
UEFA Women's Nations League record
| Year | Lg | Gp | Pos | P | W | D | L | GF | GA | P/R | Rnk |
|---|---|---|---|---|---|---|---|---|---|---|---|
| 2023–24 | Did not enter | | | | | | | | | | |
| 2025 | C | 3 | 3rd | 6 | 0 | 1 | 5 | 5 | 26 | Same position | 52nd |
| Total | | | | – | – | – | – | – | – | – | |

| ▲ | Promoted at end of season |
| Same position | No movement at end of season |
| ▼ | Relegated at end of season |
| * | Participated in promotion/relegation play-offs |

== See also ==
- Sport in Liechtenstein
  - Football in Liechtenstein
    - Women's football in Liechtenstein
- Liechtenstein women's national under-21 football team
- Liechtenstein women's national under-17 football team
- Liechtenstein men's national football team
