= Women's football in Liechtenstein =

- Country: Liechtenstein
- Governing body: Liechtenstein Football Association
- National team: women's national team
- Nickname: The Blues-Reds

International competitions
- Champions League; FIFA Women's World Cup (national team); European Championship (national team); Olympics (national team)

Women's football in Liechtenstein faces challenges because it is not amongst the most popular sports for women. However, in recent years there have been national teams formed in various age groups, and the sport is gaining popularity.

== History ==
Women's football officially began in the country in 1998, and faced a number of structural, population and geographic hurdles. Starting in 2003, LFV organized a girls' football tournament as part of their schools tournament. Participation increased for several years, with girls eligible to play on school teams with boys at the F, E and D junior levels. In 2007, some of the teams including girls that competed in the tournament included "Herzensbrecherinnen", "Die wilden Sieger", "Die wilden Mädchen", "Dia guata Schällabärgerinna", "Sheep to sheep", "Hip-Hop Girls" and "Ice Girls". In 2008, LFV created "Mädchen am Ball", a project designed to encourage girls to take up the sport. One of the outcomes of the program was the creation of junior girls teams affiliated with football clubs in the country including FC Schaan, USV Eschen/Mauren and FC Ruggell. This program was still active in 2011, with LFV holding a pair of introductory training courses for girls in grades 2 to 5 in May of that year. This followed several events for girls earlier in the year to encourage them to take up a sport traditionally associated with boys. These courses were seen as part of a step towards creating a youth player base that would assist in the creation of a women's national team that could compete in the UEFA Women's Championship and the FIFA Women's World Cup. That year, a women's football program was held during Sarganser Sport Week. It was organized by Monika Zuppiger, LFV's Youth Talent Coordinator. In 2010, FC Triesen held a training day for junior and senior women's players, with the goal of encouraging them to get more involved in the sport and get in the practice of playing every Saturday.

In 2012, the program saw FC Triesenberg become the first junior girls team to participate in an LFV sponsored tournament. Representatives from the country participated in a 2014 study group called "Women´s football in Iceland" as visitors. Their delegation was headed by Monika Burgmeier, along with top level women's club coaches Stefan Negele, Anton Kindle and Walter Vogt. Burgmeier presented a session called, "Women’s football in Liechtenstein". The following year, the Liechtenstein Football Association formally created a program to work towards the development of women's football in the country. According to the Liechtenstein Football Association, this began to bear fruit in 2017. In September 2017, as part of a program with FIFA, kits, safety equipment and training materials were provided to 200 girls in the country to encourage their participation in the sport.

== Popularity and participation ==
Volleyball was the most popular women's sport in the country, with football ranking as the 6th or 7th most popular. By 2017, football had supplanted volleyball as the most popular women's sport. In 2006, there were 165 registered female players in the country. This represented growth from 72 players in 2000. Less than 3% of the national federation's budget is earmarked for women's football, compared to 9% for men and 17% for youth. There were 283 registered female players in 2016, with a decline in 2017 to 259 registered players. 61 of these players in 2017 were 18+, while 198 were youth players. The ratio of male to female coaches was 89:11 in 2017. 4 of these women coaches were UEFA B licence holders while another 4 were National C licence holders. There was one qualified female referee in the country in 2017, and she only worked women's games. Girls played football in mixed groups as part of their organized school curriculum.

== Club football ==
The first women's club side in the country was FC Ruggell, who were founded in 1987 and played in the first division of the Meisterschaftsbetrieb des Ostschweizer Fussballverbandes (OFV) in eastern Switzerland. The team continued to play in that division for a number of years. For the 2003–04 season, they merged with FC Bad Ragaz and in 2007 they were known as FC Ruggell-Liechtenstein. They play at the highest level from 2003–04 on before being relegated for the 2006–07 season to the NLB. The team qualified for the 2003 and 2008 Swiss Cup, making it to the quarterfinals both years. In 2003–04 and 2004–05, they qualified for the semi-finals of the Swiss Cup. In 2008, the team disbanded for financial reasons.

The second club to form was FC Vaduz, which was created in 1990. The women's club existed for only a year and a half before it was dissolved. The third club to be created was FC Triesen. It was founded in 1996. When FC Ruggel dissolved in 2008, it left FC Triesen as the only senior women's club side in the country. In 2012, FC Sulz was created. This was the first women's football club created in the country that was not affiliated with a men's club. The organization was created to promote the development of women's football in Vorarlberg.

Playing in Switzerland is the norm for most women's clubs in the country as a result of the size of their population and its location. Liechtenstein women's clubs that have played in Switzerland based leagues include FC Ruggell and Triesen/Balzers. Women from Liechtenstein have also played for clubs in Switzerland. In 2017, three women from the country played for FC St. Gallen / Staad including Katja Beck, Sophia Hürlimann and Lena Göppel.

Liechtenstein women also play in a domestic league. The league is supported by the Liechtenstein Football Association. It had 4 teams in 2017. The league was not professional, with all the players being domestic ones. Average attendance at league matches was 30 people in 2017.

=== FC Triesen ===
FC Triesen is one of the football clubs in the country that has been working on developing female players on the grassroots level. They have several women's and girls teams affiliated with them, including a women's side playing in Switzerland. This team has players from several countries including Colombia, Switzerland, Turkey, the Netherlands and Italy. There is also a second level women's team called FC Balzers / FC Triesen.

== National teams ==
Liechtenstein did not have a national team by 2006 on either the senior or youth level. The women's national team did not play in any FIFA-sanctioned matches until early 2020. In 2013, President of the Liechtenstein Football Association (LFV) Matthias Voigt said he was committed towards working on the creation of a women's national team, and pointed to the activity level in the women's domestic competition. Despite this comment, the federation had no staff dedicated to women's football as of 2017 and also did not have a women's football committee. Inclusion of women in governance was also limited, with only one woman serving on a committee and only 5 women serving in managerial positions within the organization. Progress on the development front as a result of activities by the LFV were part of the reason that Radio Liechtenstein cited as why in September 2017, it was the time to create a senior women's national team.

U-16 and U-18 girls' national teams have been in existence by 2017. UEFA listed the senior national women's side as a U-19 B team.

=== Senior team ===
The LFV took the initial steps in building the national women's team for the first time in January 2020, starting with a training camp where older players were called up from clubs in Austria or Switzerland, joining their under-19 compatriots. Liechtenstein played their first matches, both unofficial, against Grasshopper Club Zürich Frauen U17s and FC Bühler on 12 and 26 January. They will make their senior debut in international women's football with a friendly against Luxembourg in Ruggell on 11 April 2021.

=== National U-16 team ===
The women's national U-16 team was formally created by the LFV in 2014. They had their first team training session in August of that year. The timing of their creation was so they could try to participate in the April 2015 UEFA Women's Under-16 Development tournament. The team's first coach was 29-year-old Tanja Herrmann, and the roster included 30 players. Herrman, a former player in the top women's league in the country, chose Monica Burgmeier to serve as her assistant coach. She had a UEFA B+ coaching license. They were the first women's national football team on any level for the country.

Players were first called up to the national side in October and November 2014. Some of the earliest players named to the squad included 7 players from FC Schaan.

The team competed in the UEFA Women's Under 16's Development tournament, the first tournament appearance by any women's national team for the country. Their competition included Montenegro, Macedonia and Luxembourg. They were coached by Tanja Herrmann. They lost their opener 1–5 to Montenegro. This match was the first in the country's history on any level for a women's national football team. They lost to Luxembourg 4–5, after initially leading 4–0 at the half. They lost to Macedonia 1–4, going down 0–4 in the first ten minutes of the game.

In November 2015, the team participated in a blitz tournament Lucerne, where they competed against domestic club teams including Rapperswil, Luzern, Genf and YB. They ended the tournament with a win, a draw and a pair of losses.

The team was back for the 2016 edition of UEFA Women's Under 16's Development tournament. Their competition included Azerbaijan and Malta. The team only lost to Malta 1-2 after conceding a goal in the final minute of the game. They lost to Austria 0–4.

=== National U-17 team ===
The team participated in the 2017 UEFA Development Tournament in Macedonia. They were in a group with Israel, Romania and host Macedonia. They defeated Macedonia 3–2, lost to Israel 0–3 and lost to Romania 0–2. Their victory against Macedonia was the first time a Liechtenstein women's national football team had ever won an international match across all age levels. They were coached in the tournament by Selina Ruckstuhl.

=== National U-19 team ===
FIFA, UEFA and LFV committed to working on the development of women's football in the country, including the creation of youth women's national teams as part of efforts to create a senior national team. Among other things, this resulted in girls and women players jerseys, shin guards and shoes so all players would have access to the same level of equipment and consistency of materials across the local women's football ecosystem. These materials were distributed at a ceremony in September 2017. Following this ceremony at Sportplatz Blumenau in Triesen, the national U-19 team played their first game in their history against East Switzerland women's U-19 club side St.Gallen-Goldach. The U-19 team lost 4–3. They had led 0–2 going into the end of the first half.

The team played a friendly in October 2017 against Luxembourg which they drew 3–3. This game was their first official international match in their history. The national team is scheduled to play in the 2018–19 Women's Euro Under-19 Championship. Their qualification group, Group 6, included Denmark, Serbia and Greece. This competition served as the team's international debut. The team was coached by Selina Ruckstuhl, who also coaches OFV Under-15 girls' regional selection and FC Bühler.
