= 2024–25 Swiss Women's Cup =

Swiss women's football cup season

Tournament details
- Country: Switzerland
- Dates: 7 September 2024 – 29 March 2025
- Teams: 60

Tournament statistics
- Matches played: 30
- Goals scored: 187 (6.23 per match)
- All statistics correct as of 11 September 2024. Goals scored in penalty shoot-outs not included.

The 2024–25 season of the Swiss Women's Cup, also known as AXA Women's Cup for sponsorship reasons, is the 55th season of Swiss national women's football cup competition.

The first round pairings for the 2024–25 season were drawn on 1 July 2024. The first round takes place on 7–8 September 2024. The final is planned for 19 March 2025.

Servette Chênois are the defending champion, having defended their title in the 2023–24 season, their second triumph overall.

== Teams ==
Super League		Nationalliga B	
The 10 teams in the 2024–25 season.		The 10 teams in the 2024–25 season.	
FC Aarau; FC Basel 1893; GC Zürich; FC Luzern; FC Rapperswil-Jona; Servette Chênois (Note: The finalists of the 2023–24 Super League play-offs get a bye in the first round.); FC St. Gallen 1879; Thun Berner-Oberland; BSC YB Frauen; FC Zürich		Étoile Carouge FC; FC Küssnacht a/R; FC Lugano; FC Oerlikon/Polizei ZH; FC Schlieren; FC Sion; FC Solothurn; FC Wil 1900; FC Winterthur; Yverdon Sport FC	
1. Liga		2. & 3. Liga	
23 of 24 teams playing in the 2024–25 season. (Note: Reserve teams are not eligible, FC Schlieren II is therefore not competing.)		The 19 Regional Association Nominees.	
Avanchet-Sport FC; FC Baar; FFV Basel; FC Biel-Bienne 1896; FC Blue Stars Zürich 1968; SC Düdingen; FC Eschenbach; FC Erlinsbach; AS Gambarogno; SC Holligen 94; FC Luzern Frauen; FC Lausanne-Sport	FC Ostermundigen; FC Renens; SC Schwyz; FC Sempach; SV Sissach; FC Staad; FF Toggenburg; FC Vuisternens/Mézières; FC Wädenswil; FC Widnau; Zürisee-United	2. Liga; ASI Audax-Friul; SC Blustavia; FC Bühler; FC Effretikon; SV Höngg; SC Nebikon; FC Niederlenz; FC Printse Val d’Hérens; FC Romanshorn; FC Schwarz-Weiss Basel; SG Stans-Engelberg; US Terre Sainte	3. Liga; FC Ascona; FC Breitenrain Bern; FC Champel; FC Clos du Doubs; FC Cugy-Montet-Aumont-Murist; FC Entfelden; Suva Fairplay Trophy: FC Blau-Weiss Oberburg

== Round 1 ==
The teams competing in the Super League or the Nationalliga B could not be drawn against each other. The lower-ranked team always gets the home advantage.

4 September 2024	FC Renens	1–2	Étoile Carouge FC	Renens
20:00 CEST (UTC+2)	Jesic 58'	Report	Sogan 34', 71'	Stadium: Zone sportive du Censuy

5 September 2024	FC Widnau	2–7	FC Oerlikon/Polizei ZH	Widnau
20:15 CEST (UTC+2)	Walt 4'; Falcón 45+2'	Report	Zehnder 2'; Moser 11', 59', 62'; Akyol 22', 70' (pen.); Hurni 64'	Stadium: Aegeten; Attendance: 111

6 September 2024	FC Bühler	3–2	FF Toggenburg	Bühler
20:15 CEST (UTC+2)	Heeb 6'; Hangartner 50' (o.g.); Hörler 90'	Report	Brändle 75'; Loser 87' (o.g.)	Stadium: Göbsimühle

7 September 2024	SV Höngg	2–4	FC Winterthur	Zürich
16:00 CEST (UTC+2)	Kressig 12'; Deplazes 89'	Report	Beer 50'; Van Niekerk 69', 87'; Bösiger 85'	Stadium: Hönggerberg

7 September 2024	FC Blau-Weiss Oberburg	1–3	FC Biel-Bienne 1896	Oberburg
17:00 CEST (UTC+2)	Haller 79'	Report	Bosshard 48'; Grundbacher 63' (o.g.); Tschanz 67'	Stadium: Emme Oberburg

7 September 2024	FC Schwarz-Weiss Basel	0–4	FC Lausanne-Sport	Allschwil
17:00 CEST (UTC+2)		Report	Ferreira 16', 81'; Geiser 39'; Khiri 89'	Stadium: Bachgraben

7 September 2024	SC Blustavia	0–8	FC Luzern	Solothurn
17:00 CEST (UTC+2)		Report	Jost 37', 67' (pen.); Kenel 39', 82'; Sager 45+2', 89'; Ueltschi 59', 72'	Stadium: Mittleres Brühl

7 September 2024	US Terre Sainte	2–3	Zürisee-United	Coppet
17:00 CEST (UTC+2)	Jacobs 31'; Poacher 49'	Report	Wittwer 8'; Moore 29'; Löser 60'	Stadium: Centre Sportif des Rojalets

7 September 2024	FC Champel	0–6	SC Düdingen	Veyrier
17:30 CEST (UTC+2)		Report	Morina 6', 29'; Vonlanthen 12'; Moser 61'; Qaja 79'; Raetzo 90+1'	Stadium: Centre sportif de Vessy

7 September 2024	FC Ostermundigen	2–5	BSC YB Frauen	Ostermundigen
17:30 CEST (UTC+2)		Report		Stadium: Oberfeld

7 September 2024	FC Staad	1–2	FC Rapperswil-Jona	Staad
18:00 CEST (UTC+2)	Wehrle 15'	Report	Kleinlercher 4'; Weber 58'	Stadium: Bützel

7 September 2024	FC Erlinsbach	2–1 (a.e.t.)	FC Baar	Niedererlinsbach
18:00 CEST (UTC+2)	Zeravica 7'; De Abreu 117'	Report	Grässli 14'	Stadium: Sportplatz Breite

7 September 2024	FC Sempach	1–5	FC Solothurn	Sempach
18:00 CEST (UTC+2)	Marti 51'	Report	Cremona 7'; Adam 41'; Bohner 82', 90+4'; Siepe 83'	Stadium: Sportanlage Seeland

7 September 2024	ASI Audax-Friul	2–12	FC Basel 1893	Neuchâtel
18:00 CEST (UTC+2)	Bajrami 11', 90+1'	Report	Ugochukwu 12', 43', 50', 75', 89'; Krasniqi 16', 22'; Rudelic 36'; Nikolić 53', 68', 74', 88'	Stadium: Pierre-à-Bot

7 September 2024	Avanchet-Sport FC	1–8	FFV Basel	Vernier
18:00 CEST (UTC+2)	Almeida Albuquerque 20'	Report	Vonmoos 3', 25'; Messerli 7'; Di Bella 44', 77'; Niederberger 80'; Rothen 87', 90'	Stadium: Stade municipal de Vernier

7 September 2024	FC Entfelden	2–1	FC Romanshorn	Unterentfelden
18:30 CEST (UTC+2)		Report		Stadium: Bächen

7 September 2024	FC Printse Val d’Hérens	0–10	FC Sion	Euseigne
19:00 CEST (UTC+2)		Report	Fontannaz 20', 39', 50', 60', 65'; Diakite 25', 51'; Figueiras 34'; Aristodimou 72'; Grivaz 84'	Stadium: Stade Saint-Georges

7 September 2024	FC Cugy-Montet-Aumont-Murist	0–10	SV Sissach	Cugy
19:00 CEST (UTC+2)		Report	Metzger 2', 88'; Sanchéz Puig 25'; Pricoli 39', 44', 51', 61', 65', 76'; Aktas 90+1'	Stadium: Stade des Abattoires

7 September 2024	FC Vuisternens/Mézières	3–7	Yverdon Sport FC	Vuisternens-devant-Romont
19:00 CEST (UTC+2)	Thomann 7'; Ferraz 17'; Brügger 58'	Report	Cakic 2'; Silvestri 6'; Warpelin 18'; Boccali 52'; Grande 71'; Bodenmann 74'; Savoie 89'	Stadium: Stade Condémine

7 September 2024	SC Nebikon	0–1	SC Schwyz	Nebikon
19:30 CEST (UTC+2)		Report	Thalmann 55'	Stadium: Stämpfel

7 September 2024	SC Holligen 94	1–6	Thun Berner-Oberland	Bern
19:30 CEST (UTC+2)	Villars 27'	Report	Aeberhard 12'; Ueltschi 25', 34'; Petkova 32'; Ferrara 83'; Minnig 90+2'	Stadium: Steigerhubel

7 September 2024	SG Stans-Engelberg	0–6	FC Küssnacht a/R	Stans
19:30 CEST (UTC+2)		Report	Weber 18', 27'; Schilliger 53', 62'; Ulrich 66'; Mazza 87'	Stadium: Eichli

7 September 2024	FC Eschenbach	1–0	FC Schlieren	Eschenbach
20:00 CEST (UTC+2)	Diethelm 80'	Report		Stadium: Eschewies

7 September 2024	FC Wädenswil	2–2 (a.e.t.) (1–2 p)	FC Wil 1900	Wädenswil
20:00 CEST (UTC+2)	Trajkovska 34'; Mächler 45'	Report	Di Gaetano 41'; Böhi 77'	Stadium: Beichlen

8 September 2024	FC Blue Stars Zürich 1968	0–5	FC St. Gallen 1879	Zürich
14:00 CEST (UTC+2)		Report	Bernet 14'; Glanzmann 18'; Nilsson 33'; Iseni 57'; de Freitas 78'	Stadium: Hardhof

8 September 2024	FC Clos du Doubs	0–6	FC Breitenrain Bern	Saint-Ursanne
14:30 CEST (UTC+2)		Report	Dubach 7'; Motta 25', 28', 41'; Oesch 37'; Frey 50'	Stadium: Champs-Fallats

8 September 2024	FC Niederlenz	0–13	FC Aarau	Niederlenz
15:00 CEST (UTC+2)		Report	Friedli 22'; Mujela 25', 71', 87'; Dössegger 33' (o.g.); Klingenstein 48'; Avduli 67', 78'; Deda 72'; Flückiger 76'; Tauriello 83'; Steck 84', 86'	Stadium: Altfeld

8 September 2024	FC Ascona	0–5	FC Luzern Frauen	Ascona
15:00 CEST (UTC+2)		Report	Höltschi 6'; Sowe 33'; Remund 37'; Haller 60'; Stuparevic 68'	Stadium: Stadio Comunale Ascona

8 September 2024	AS Gambarogno	0–0 (a.e.t.) (5–4 p)	FC Lugano	Magadino
16:00 CEST (UTC+2)		Report		Stadium: Centro Sportivo Regionale Magadino

11 September 2024	FC Effretikon	1–13	GC Zürich	Effretikon
20:00 CEST (UTC+2)		Report		Stadium: Sportzentrum Eselriet

== Round 2 ==
The draw for round 2 was conducted on 10 September 2024.

5–6 October 2024	FC Bühler	v	GC Zürich
CEST (UTC+2)

5–6 October 2024	FC Breitenrain Bern	v	FC Küssnacht a/R
CEST (UTC+2)

5–6 October 2024	SC Schwyz	v	Zürisee-United
CEST (UTC+2)

5–6 October 2024	FC Biel-Bienne 1896	v	FC Oerlikon/Polizei ZH
CEST (UTC+2)

5–6 October 2024	SC Düdingen	v	Étoile Carouge FC
CEST (UTC+2)

5–6 October 2024	FC Lausanne-Sport	v	SV Sissach
CEST (UTC+2)

5–6 October 2024	FC Erlinsbach	v	FFV Basel
CEST (UTC+2)

5–6 October 2024	FC Eschenbach	v	Thun Berner-Oberland
CEST (UTC+2)

5–6 October 2024	FC Wil 1900	v	FC Luzern
CEST (UTC+2)

5–6 October 2024	FC Sion	v	BSC YB Frauen
CEST (UTC+2)

5–6 October 2024	FC Winterthur	v	FC Zürich
CEST (UTC+2)

5–6 October 2024	FC Luzern Frauen	v	Servette Chênois
CEST (UTC+2)

5–6 October 2024	FC Entfelden	v	FC Aarau
CEST (UTC+2)

5–6 October 2024	AS Gambarogno	v	FC Basel 1893
CEST (UTC+2)

5–6 October 2024	Yverdon Sport FC	v	FC Rapperswil-Jona
CEST (UTC+2)

5–6 October 2024	FC Solothurn	v	FC St. Gallen 1879
CEST (UTC+2)

== Round 3 ==
The draw for round 3 is scheduled for 15 October 2024.

9–10 November 2024	–
CET (UTC+1)

9–10 November 2024	–
CET (UTC+1)

9–10 November 2024	–
CET (UTC+1)

9–10 November 2024	–
CET (UTC+1)

9–10 November 2024	–
CET (UTC+1)

9–10 November 2024	–
CET (UTC+1)

9–10 November 2024	–
CET (UTC+1)

9–10 November 2024	–
CET (UTC+1)

== Round 4 (quarter-finals) ==
The draw for round 4 is scheduled for 12 November 2024.

15 February 2025	–
CET (UTC+1)

15 February 2025	–
CET (UTC+1)

15 February 2025	–
CET (UTC+1)

15 February 2025	–
CET (UTC+1)

== Final Rounds ==
=== Bracket ===
Semi-finals
15–16 March 2025
15–16 March 2025

Final
29 March 2025

=== Semi-finals ===
15–16 March 2025
CET (UTC+1)

–

15–16 March 2025
CET (UTC+1)

–

=== Final ===
29 March 2025
CET (UTC+1)

–
