= 2026–27 Swiss Women's Cup =

Swiss women's football cup season

Tournament details
- Country: Switzerland
- Dates: 22 August 2026 – 30 May 2027
- Teams: 62

Tournament statistics
- Matches played: 54
- Goals scored: 365 (6.76 per match)
- All statistics correct as of 31 October 2026. Goals scored in penalty shoot-outs not included.

The 2026–27 season of the Swiss Women's Cup, also known as AXA Women's Cup for sponsorship reasons, is the 57th season of Swiss national women's football cup competition. The cup runs from 22 August 2026 to 30 May 2027.

== Teams ==
| Super League | | Nationalliga B | |
| The 10 teams in the 2026–27 season. | | The 12 teams in the 2026–27 season. | |
| FC Aarau; FC Basel 1893; GC Zürich; FC Luzern; FC Rapperswil-Jona; Servette Chênois (Note: Received a bye in the first round.); FC St. Gallen 1879; BSC YB Frauen; Yverdon Sport FC; FC Zürich | | Étoile Carouge FC; FFV Basel; AS Gambarogno; FC Küssnacht a/R; FC Lugano; FC Oerlikon/Polizei ZH; FC Ostermundigen; FC Schlieren; FC Sion; Thun Berner-Oberland; FC Wil 1900; FC Winterthur | |
| 1. Liga | | 2., 3. & 4. Liga | |
| 23 teams playing in the 2026–27 season. | | The 17 Regional Association Nominees. | |
| SC Balerna; FC Baar; FC Biel-Bienne 1896; FC Blue Stars Zürich 1968; FC Bühler; FC Concordia Basel; FC Courrendlin-Courroux; SC Düdingen; FC Erlinsbach; FC Eschenbach; Lausanne Nord; FC Lausanne-Sport | FC Luzern Frauen; FC Mels; FC Renens; SC Schwyz; FC Sempach; SV Sissach; FC Solothurn; FC Staad; US Terre Sainte; FF Toggenburg; FC Wädenswil | 2. Liga; Gäu Selection; SC Holligen 94; CS Interstar; Frauenfussball Seetal; FC Uster; FC Uzwil; FC Vétroz; FC Villars-sur-Glâne; FC Widnau; FC Wiedikon ZH; FC Wohlen; Xamax Audax Féminin | 3. Liga; FC Alle; AF LUC-Dorigny; FC Gelterkinden; 4. Liga; FC Malcantone; Team Gürbetal |

== Round 1 ==
| 22 August 2026 | FC Alle | 0–7 | AS Gambarogno |
| 16:00 CEST (UTC+2) | | Report |

| 22 August 2026 | AF LUC-Dorigny | 0–4 | FC Biel-Bienne 1896 |
| 17:00 CEST (UTC+2) | | Report |

| 22 August 2026 | SC Balerna | 0–4 | FC Küssnacht a/R |
| 17:30 CEST (UTC+2) | | Report |

| 22 August 2026 | FC Uster | 0–14 | FC Zürich |
| 18:00 CEST (UTC+2) | | Report |

| 22 August 2026 | FC Wiedikon ZH | 0–11 | FC St. Gallen 1879 |
| 18:00 CEST (UTC+2) | | Report |

| 22 August 2026 | FC Baar | 0–6 | Thun Berner-Oberland |
| 18:00 CEST (UTC+2) | | Report |

| 22 August 2026 | FC Luzern Frauen | 1–4 | FC Ostermundigen |
| 18:00 CEST (UTC+2) | | Report |

| 22 August 2026 | FC Uzwil | 2–7 | FC Wil 1900 |
| 18:15 CEST (UTC+2) | | Report |

| 22 August 2026 | FC Staad | 0–6 | FC Schlieren |
| 18:30 CEST (UTC+2) | | Report |

| 22 August 2026 | FC Erlinsbach | 0–6 | FC Oerlikon/Polizei ZH |
| 19:00 CEST (UTC+2) | | Report |

| 22 August 2026 | FF Toggenburg | 0–7 | GC Zürich |
| 19:00 CEST (UTC+2) | | Report |

| 22 August 2026 | FC Widnau | 1–4 | FC Eschenbach |
| 19:00 CEST (UTC+2) | | Report |

| 22 August 2026 | FC Mels | 0–13 | FC Rapperswil-Jona |
| 19:15 CEST (UTC+2) | | Report |

| 22 August 2026 | FC Malcantone | 1–4 | Team Gürbetal |
| 19:30 CEST (UTC+2) | | Report |

| 22 August 2026 | SC Holligen 94 | 0–2 | Frauenfussball Seetal |
| 19:30 CEST (UTC+2) | | Report |

| 22 August 2026 | Lausanne Nord | 0–10 | Yverdon Sport FC |
| 20:00 CEST (UTC+2) | | Report |

| 22 August 2026 | SV Sissach | 0–1 | Étoile Carouge FC |
| 20:00 CEST (UTC+2) | | Report |

| 22 August 2026 | FC Villars-sur-Glâne | 0–8 | FC Lausanne-Sport |
| 20:00 CEST (UTC+2) | | Report |

| 22 August 2026 | FC Solothurn | 0–8 | FC Luzern |
| 20:15 CEST (UTC+2) | | Report |

| 22 August 2026 | FC Renens | 0–1 | FFV Basel |
| 20:15 CEST (UTC+2) | | Report |

| 22 August 2026 | Xamax Audax Féminin | 0–6 | FC Sion |
| 20:30 CEST (UTC+2) | | Report |

| 23 August 2026 | FC Bühler | 0–3 | FC Winterthur |
| 14:00 CEST (UTC+2) | | Report |

| 23 August 2026 | FC Blue Stars Zürich 1968 | 2–3 (a.e.t.) | FC Wädenswil |
| 14:00 CEST (UTC+2) | | Report |

| 23 August 2026 | FC Sempach | 1–0 | SC Schwyz |
| 14:00 CEST (UTC+2) | | Report |

| 23 August 2026 | FC Gelterkinden | 0–6 | FC Courrendlin-Courroux |
| 14:00 CEST (UTC+2) | | Report |

| 23 August 2026 | FC Wohlen | 0–11 | FC Aarau |
| 14:30 CEST (UTC+2) | | Report |

| 23 August 2026 | FC Vétroz | 1–7 | CS Interstar |
| 15:00 CEST (UTC+2) | | Report |

| 23 August 2026 | SC Düdingen | 0–10 | FC Basel 1893 |
| 15:30 CEST (UTC+2) | | Report |

| 23 August 2026 | Gäu Selection | 0–7 | FC Lugano |
| 16:00 CEST (UTC+2) | | Report |

| 23 August 2026 | US Terre Sainte | 4–3 (a.e.t.) | FC Concordia Basel |
| 16:00 CEST (UTC+2) | | Report |

== Round 2 ==
| 25 September 2026 | Team Gürbetal | 0–26 | BSC YB Frauen |
| 19:30 CEST (UTC+2) | | Report |

| 25 September 2026 | FC Wädenswil | 0–6 | GC Zürich |
| 20:00 CEST (UTC+2) | | Report |

| 25 September 2026 | Frauenfussball Seetal | 0–5 | FC Luzern |
| 20:00 CEST (UTC+2) | | Report |

| 26 September 2026 | FC Schlieren | 1–2 (a.e.t.) | FC St. Gallen 1879 |
| 16:30 CEST (UTC+2) | | Report |

| 26 September 2026 | FC Oerlikon/Polizei ZH | 1–3 | FC Küssnacht a/R |
| 17:30 CEST (UTC+2) | | Report |

| 26 September 2026 | AS Gambarogno | 0–12 | Servette Chênois |
| 19:00 CEST (UTC+2) | | Report |

| 26 September 2026 | CS Interstar | 1–5 | FC Aarau |
| 20:30 CEST (UTC+2) | | Report |

| 27 September 2026 | FC Sempach | 0–7 | FC Zürich |
| 12:00 CEST (UTC+2) | | Report |

| 27 September 2026 | FC Ostermundigen | 0–3 | Thun Berner-Oberland |
| 13:30 CEST (UTC+2) | | Report |

| 27 September 2026 | FC Lausanne-Sport | 3–3 (a.e.t.) (6–8 p) | FC Winterthur | Lausanne |
| 14:00 CEST (UTC+2) | Nzeza 61'; Morina 90+1'; Jesic 100' | Report | Huber 11' (pen.); Hürlimann 70'; Van Niekerk 92' | Stadium: Stade de la Tuilière |

| 27 September 2026 | FC Biel-Bienne 1896 | 1–3 | FC Sion |
| 15:00 CEST (UTC+2) | | Report |

| 27 September 2026 | FC Courrendlin-Courroux | 5–3 | FFV Basel |
| 15:00 CEST (UTC+2) | | Report |

| 27 September 2026 | FC Eschenbach | 1–3 | Yverdon Sport FC |
| 15:30 CEST (UTC+2) | | Report |

| 27 September 2026 | Étoile Carouge FC | 0–4 | FC Rapperswil-Jona |
| 16:00 CEST (UTC+2) | | Report |

| 27 September 2026 | US Terre Sainte | 1–4 | FC Wil 1900 |
| 16:00 CEST (UTC+2) | | Report |

| 27 September 2026 | FC Lugano | 0–8 | FC Basel 1893 |
| 16:30 CEST (UTC+2) | | Report |

== Round 3 ==
| 24 October 2026 | FC Aarau | 3–4 | FC Basel 1893 | Aarau |
| 16:30 CEST (UTC+2) | Ragusa 17'; Schütt 46'; Elezi 85' | Report | Matuschewski 36', 43'; Arthur 76'; Göppel 90' | Stadium: Schachen |

| 24 October 2026 | FC Sion | 2–10 | FC St. Gallen 1879 | Ayent |
| 18:00 CEST (UTC+2) | Salomon 31', 88' | Report | Ammann 9', 89'; Aeberhard 14', 50', 63', 85'; Koopman 26', 35'; Wyser 48'; Ibishaj 66' | Stadium: Stade Saint-Jacques |

| 24 October 2026 | FC Wil 1900 | 0–8 | Servette Chênois | Wil |
| 18:00 CEST (UTC+2) | | Report | Sobal 28'; Karchouni 41'; Marinelli 59' (pen.), 72'; Andonova 66'; Marchão 69' (pen.); Terchoun 77', 87' | Stadium: Bergholz |

| 24 October 2026 | FC Luzern | 2–4 (a.e.t.) | FC Rapperswil-Jona | Lucerne |
| 19:00 CEST (UTC+2) | Egeriis 30'; Baraniak 64' (pen.) | Report | Wälti 3' (o.g.); McFarland 61' (pen.); Deda 101'; Way 115' | Stadium: Hubelmatt |

| 24 October 2026 | FC Zürich | 1–3 | BSC YB Frauen | Zürich |
| 20:30 CEST (UTC+2) | Hinder 77' | Report | Bonsu 49', 66', 78' | Stadium: Letzigrund |

| 25 October 2026 | FC Winterthur | 3–1 | FC Küssnacht a/R | Winterthur |
| 14:00 CET (UTC+1) | Dahinden 45'; La Bella 76'; Van Niekerk 77' | Report | Scherrer 60' | Stadium: Schützenwiese |

| 25 October 2026 | FC Courrendlin-Courroux | 1–10 | Yverdon Sport FC | Courroux |
| 15:00 CET (UTC+1) | Brosy 46' | Report | Sogan 4', 16', 41', 54', 59'; Velkova 11'; Gaillard Mauron 51'; von Dach 72' (pen.); Le Franc 74'; Warpelin 82' | Stadium: Bellevie |

| 25 October 2026 | Thun Berner-Oberland | 1–5 | GC Zürich | Thun |
| 17:00 CET (UTC+1) | Jud 88' | Report | Cazalla 18'; McKenna 21', 39', 60'; Storni 82' | Stadium: Visana Stadion |

== Round 4 (quarter-finals) ==
| 13 February 2027 | Servette Chênois | – | FC Basel 1893 |
| CET (UTC+1) | | Report |

| 13 February 2027 | FC Winterthur | – | FC St. Gallen 1879 |
| CET (UTC+1) | | Report |

| 13 February 2027 | GC Zürich | – | BSC YB Frauen |
| CET (UTC+1) | | Report |

| 13 February 2027 | Yverdon Sport FC | – | FC Rapperswil-Jona |
| 18:00 CET (UTC+1) | | Report |

== Final Rounds ==
=== Bracket ===
Semi-finals

Final

=== Semi-finals ===
| – |

| – |

=== Final ===
| – |
