= Salomé Stampfli =

Liechtensteiner footballer (born 2005)

Personal information
- Date of birth: 9 June 2005 (age 21)
- Height: 1.61 m (5 ft 3 in)
- Position: Midfielder

Team information
- Current team: Altach
- Number: 24

Youth career
- –2022: Mels
- 2022–2025: St. Gallen

Senior career*
Years	Team	Apps	(Gls)
2025–	Altach	0	(0)

International career^{‡}
2019	Liechtenstein U-16	3	(0)
2021–2024	Liechtenstein U-19	14	(1)
2021–	Liechtenstein	16	(2)
- * Club domestic league appearances and goals as of 6 June 2026 ‡ National team caps and goals as of 10 October 2026

Salomé Stampfli (born 9 June 2005) is a Liechtensteiner footballer who plays as a midfielder for the ÖFB Frauen Bundesliga club Altach and for the Liechtenstein national football team.

== International career ==
Stampfli made her senior debut for Liechtenstein in a friendly against Gibraltar on 26 November 2021.

== Career statistics ==
=== International ===
Liechtenstein
Year	Apps	Goals
2021	2	1
2022	1	0
2023	2	0
2024	4	1
2025	4	0
2026	3	0
Total	16	2

=== International goals ===
#	Date	Venue	Opponent	Score	Result	Competition
1.	29 November 2021	Victoria Stadium, Gibraltar	Gibraltar	3–1	3–2	Friendly
2.	11 July 2024	Freizeitpark Widau, Ruggell, Liechtenstein	Namibia	1–1	1–1	Friendly
