= Viktoria Gerner =

Liechtensteiner footballer

Personal information
- Full name: Viktoria Viga Anna Gerner
- Date of birth: 22 April 1989 (age 37)
- Position: Midfielder

Team information
- Current team: Staad

Senior career*
Years	Team	Apps	(Gls)
2004–2021	Triesen		
2021–2023	Wil	9	(2)
2023–	Staad		

International career^{‡}
2021–	Liechtenstein	25	(3)
- * Club domestic league appearances and goals as of 6 June 2026 ‡ National team caps and goals as of 10 October 2026

Viktoria Viga Anna Gerner (born 22 April 1989) is a Liechtensteiner footballer who plays as a midfielder for FC Staad and the Liechtenstein women's national team.

On 11 April 2021, she scored the first official goal for the women's national team, in an international friendly match against Luxembourg.

== Career statistics ==
=== International ===
Liechtenstein
Year	Apps	Goals
2021	3	3
2022	3	0
2023	2	0
2024	4	0
2025	7	0
2026	6	0
Total	25	3

=== International goals ===
#	Date	Venue	Opponent	Score	Result	Competition
1.	11 April 2021	Sportpark Eschen-Mauren, Eschen, Liechtenstein	Luxembourg	1–0	1–2	Friendly
2.	24 June 2021	Freizeitpark Widau, Ruggell, Liechtenstein	Gibraltar	2–0	4–1	Friendly
3.	27 June 2021	Freizeitpark Widau, Ruggell, Liechtenstein	Gibraltar	1–0	2–1	Friendly
