= Lia Hermann =

Liechtensteiner footballer

Personal information
- Full name: Lia Hermann
- Date of birth: 26 June 2005 (age 21)
- Position: Forward

Team information
- Current team: Altach
- Number: 27

Youth career
- –2021: FC Mels
- 2021–2025: St. Gallen

Senior career*
| Years | Team | Apps | (Gls) |
| 2025– | Altach | 2 | (0) |

International career^{‡}
| 2021–2022 | Liechtenstein U19 | 6 | (1) |
| 2025– | Liechtenstein | 6 | (0) |
- * Club domestic league appearances and goals as of 6 June 2026 ‡ National team caps and goals as of 10 October 2026

Lia Hermann (born 26 June 2005) is a Liechtensteiner footballer who plays as a forward for the ÖFB Frauen Bundesliga club Altach and the Liechtenstein national football team.

== Career ==
Hermann made her professional debut for Altach on 22 March 2026 in a match against First Vienna.

Hermann's senior international debut for Liechtenstein came in a friendly match against Hong Kong on 29 November 2025.

== Career statistics ==
=== International ===
Liechtenstein
| Year | Apps | Goals |
|---|---|---|
| 2025 | 1 | 0 |
| 2026 | 5 | 0 |
| Total | 6 | 0 |
