= Vanessa Wenger =

Liechtensteiner footballer

Personal information
- Full name: Vanessa Wenger
- Date of birth: 19 April 2009 (age 17)
- Position: Defender

Team information
- Current team: Thun
- Number: 20

Youth career
- –2026: St. Gallen

Senior career*
Years	Team	Apps	(Gls)
2026–	Thun	4	(1)

International career^{‡}
2025–	Liechtenstein U-19	6	(0)
2026–	Liechtenstein	4	(0)
- * Club domestic league appearances and goals as of 6 June 2026 ‡ National team caps and goals as of 10 June 2026

Vanessa Wenger (born 19 April 2009) is a Liechtensteiner footballer who plays as a defender for the Swiss Women's Super League club Thun and the Liechtenstein national football team.

== Career ==
In 2026, Wenger joined Thun from St. Gallen.

She made her professional debut and scored her first goal on 7 February 2026 against Luzern.

Wenger's senior international debut came in a 2027 FIFA Women's World Cup qualification match against Estonia women's national football team on 14 April 2026.

== Career statistics ==
=== International ===
Liechtenstein
Year	Apps	Goals
2026	4	0
Total	4	0
