= Goppel =

Goppel or Göppel is a surname. Notable people with the surname include:

- Alfons Goppel (1905–1991), German politician
- Josef Göppel (1950–2022), German politician
- Lena Göppel (born 2001), Liechtensteiner football player
- Maximilian Göppel (born 1997), Liechtensteiner football player
- Thijmen Goppel (born 1997), Dutch football player
- Thomas Goppel (born 1947), German politician

== Fictional characters ==
- Agnes Goppel, played by Juliet Aykroyd in Man of Straw, a British TV series
