= Katharina Risch =

Liechtensteiner footballer

Personal information
- Full name: Katharina Teresa Risch
- Date of birth: 9 November 2004 (age 21)
- Place of birth: Vaduz, Liechtenstein
- Height: 1.63 m (5 ft 4 in)
- Position: Midfielder

Team information
- Current team: St. Gallen
- Number: 24

Youth career
- –2020: Vaduz

Senior career*
Years	Team	Apps	(Gls)
2020–	St. Gallen	73	(3)

International career^{‡}
2018–2019	Liechtenstein U-16	7	(0)
2020	Switzerland U-17	1	(1)
2021	Switzerland U-19	2	(0)
2022–2023	Liechtenstein U-19	5	(0)
2023–	Liechtenstein	18	(4)
- * Club domestic league appearances and goals as of 6 June 2026 ‡ National team caps and goals as of 10 October 2026

Katharina Risch (born 9 November 2004) is a Swiss-Liechtensteiner footballer who plays as a midfielder for the Swiss Women's Super League club St. Gallen and the Liechtenstein national football team.

== Career ==
In 2020, Risch joined St. Gallen from FC Vaduz.

In late 2020, she switched international allegiances and represented Switzerland at the under-17 and under-19 levels through 2021.

Risch returned to representing Liechtenstein in 2022, and made her debut for the senior team in a 0-4 friendly loss against Kosovo.

== Career statistics ==
=== International ===
Liechtenstein
Year	Apps	Goals
2023	2	0
2024	4	1
2025	5	2
2026	7	1
Total	18	4

=== International goals ===
#	Date	Venue	Opponent	Score	Result	Competition
1.	22 February 2024	Victoria Stadium, Gibraltar	Gibraltar	1–0	3–2	Friendly
2.	21 February 2025	Armavir City Stadium, Armavir, Armenia	Armenia	1–4	1–6	2025 UEFA Nations League
3.	8 April 2025	Sportpark Eschen-Mauren, Eschen, Liechtenstein	Luxembourg	1–2	2–3	2025 UEFA Nations League
4.	3 March 2026	Rheinpark Stadion, Vaduz, Liechtenstein	Lithuania	1–1	1–6	2027 FIFA Women's World Cup qualification
