= Fiona Batliner =

Liechtensteiner footballer (born 2003)

Personal information
- Date of birth: 22 December 2003 (age 22)
- Height: 1.70 m (5 ft 7 in)
- Position: Midfielder

Youth career
- 2018–2020: St. Gallen

Senior career*
Years	Team	Apps	(Gls)
2020–2025	St. Gallen	64	(2)

International career^{‡}
2018–2019	Liechtenstein U-16	7	(2)
2021	Liechtenstein U-19	3	(0)
2021–2023	Liechtenstein	10	(2)
- * Club domestic league appearances and goals as of 2 June 2025 ‡ National team caps and goals as of 17 July 2023

Fiona Batliner (born 22 December 2003) is a retired Liechtensteiner footballer who played as a midfielder for the Swiss club St. Gallen and the Liechtenstein national football team.

== Career ==
In 2022, Batliner was awarded the first Liechtenstein Women's Footballer of the Year award. She also received the award in 2023 and 2024.

Following a knee injury at the end of the 2023-2024 season that kept her out for the entire following season, Batliner decided to retire at the end of her contract with St. Gallen to focus on her medical studies.

== Career statistics ==
=== International ===
Liechtenstein
Year	Apps	Goals
2021	5	1
2022	3	1
2023	2	0
Total	10	2

=== International goals ===
#	Date	Venue	Opponent	Score	Result	Competition
1.	27 June 2021	Freizeitpark Widau, Ruggell, Liechtenstein	Gibraltar	2–0	2–1	Friendly
2.	3 September 2022	Center FAF, Andorra la Vella, Andorra	Andorra	1–0	1–3	Friendly

== Honours ==
=== Individual ===
- Liechtensteiner Footballer of the Year: 2022, 2023, 2024
