= Lena Göppel =

Liechtensteiner footballer

Personal information
- Full name: Lena Maria Göppel
- Date of birth: 11 August 2001 (age 25)
- Place of birth: St. Gallen, Switzerland
- Height: 1.70 m (5 ft 7 in)
- Positions: Midfielder; defender

Team information
- Current team: Basel
- Number: 5

Youth career
- 2011–2016: Schaan
- 2016–2017: St. Gallen

College career
Years	Team	Apps	(Gls)
2020–2023	Louisiana–Monroe Warhawks	73	(8)

Senior career*
Years	Team	Apps	(Gls)
2017–2020	St. Gallen	56	(5)
2024	Essen	2	(0)
2024–2026	Meppen	49	(5)
2026–	Basel	7	(1)

International career^{‡}
2016–2017	Liechtenstein U16	6	(1)
2017–2018	Liechtenstein U19	5	(0)
2021–	Liechtenstein	20	(7)
- * Club domestic league appearances and goals as of 8 October 2026 ‡ National team caps and goals as of 10 October 2026

Lena Göppel (born 11 August 2001) is a Liechtensteiner footballer who plays as a midfielder for the Basel in the Swiss Women's Super League and the Liechtenstein national football team.

== Club career ==
Göppel played a season in the Swiss Women's Super League for St. Gallen before attending university in Louisiana.

Upon graduation from Louisiana-Monroe with a bachelor's degree in business administration, she signed a deal with Frauen-Bundesliga side SGS Essen on 1 January 2024 becoming the first Liechtensteiner female footballer to sign with a top-flight club in Germany.

Following a half-season at Essen, Göppel moved to SV Meppen in the German second-tier.

Göppel signed for Basel back in the Swiss top-flight in time for the 2026/2027 campaign.

== Career statistics ==
=== International ===
Liechtenstein
Year	Apps	Goals
2021	3	2
2022	0	0
2023	2	0
2024	3	1
2025	7	1
2026	5	3
Total	20	7

=== International goals ===
#	Date	Venue	Opponent	Score	Result	Competition
1.	24 June 2021	Freizeitpark Widau, Ruggell, Liechtenstein	Gibraltar	1–0	4–1	Friendly
2.	24 June 2021	Freizeitpark Widau, Ruggell, Liechtenstein	Gibraltar	3–0	4–1	Friendly
3.	22 February 2024	Victoria Stadium, Gibraltar	Gibraltar	3–1	3–2	Friendly
4.	3 June 2025	Sportpark Eschen-Mauren, Eschen, Liechtenstein	Armenia	2–1	2–2	2025 UEFA Women's Nations League
5.	7 March 2026	Bosnia and Herzegovina FA Training Centre, Zenica, Bosnia and Herzegovina	Bosnia and Herzegovina	1–2	1–13	2027 FIFA Women's World Cup qualification
6.	10 October 2026	Rheinwiese Schaan, Schaan, Liechtenstein	Gibraltar	1–0	3–0	Friendly
7.	10 October 2026	Rheinwiese Schaan, Schaan, Liechtenstein	Gibraltar	2–0	3–0	Friendly

== Personal life ==
She is the younger sister of Liechtenstein men's international defender Maximilian Göppel.
