= Christina Müssner =

Liechtensteiner footballer

Personal information
- Date of birth: 10 December 1993 (age 32)
- Position: Striker

Team information
- Current team: Schlieren

Senior career*
Years	Team	Apps	(Gls)
–2020	Buchs		
2021–	Schlieren		

International career^{‡}
2021–	Liechtenstein	11	(2)
- * Club domestic league appearances and goals as of 15 April 2021 ‡ National team caps and goals as of 17 July 2023

Christina Müssner (born 10 December 1993) is a Liechtensteiner footballer who plays as striker for Schlieren in Switzerland and the Liechtenstein national football team.

== Career statistics ==
=== International ===
Liechtenstein
Year	Apps	Goals
2021	6	2
2022	3	0
2023	2	0
Total	11	2

=== International goals ===
#	Date	Venue	Opponent	Score	Result	Competition
1.	18 September 2021	Sportanlage Blumenau, Triesen, Liechtenstein	Andorra	2–4	2–4	Friendly
2.	29 November 2021	Victoria Stadium, Gibraltar	Gibraltar	2–0	3–2	Friendly
