= List of football stadiums in Liechtenstein =

The following is a list of football stadiums in Liechtenstein, ranked in order of capacity, with the minimum capacity being 1,000. The list includes total stadium capacity, not just seating capacity.

== Current stadiums ==
| # | Image | Stadium | Capacity | City | Home team |
|---|---|---|---|---|---|
| 1 | | Rheinpark Stadion | 7,584 | Vaduz | FC Vaduz and Liechtenstein national football team |
| 2 | | Sportplatz Rheinau | 2,000 | Balzers | FC Balzers |
| 3 | | Sportpark Eschen-Mauren | 2,000 | Eschen | USV Eschen/Mauren |
| 4 | | Sportanlage Blumenau | 2,100 | Triesen | FC Triesen |
| 5 | | Sportanlage Rheinwiese | 1,500 | Schaan | FC Schaan |

== See also ==
- Lists of stadiums
