= Katja Beck =

Liechtensteiner footballer

Personal information
- Date of birth: 17 January 1991 (age 35)
- Position: Defender

Team information
- Current team: Staad

Youth career
- 2000–2009: Triesen

Senior career*
Years	Team	Apps	(Gls)
2009–2015	Triesen		
2015–	Staad		

International career^{‡}
2021–2022	Liechtenstein	3	(0)
- * Club domestic league appearances and goals as of 18 September 2021 ‡ National team caps and goals as of 9 October 2022

Katja Beck (born 17 January 1991) is a Liechtensteiner footballer who plays as a defender for Staad and has been capped by the Liechtenstein national football team.

== Career statistics ==
=== International ===
Liechtenstein
Year	Apps	Goals
2021	1	0
2022	2	0
Total	3	0
