= Ruggeller Riet =

Wetland nature reserve in northern Liechtenstein

Ruggeller Riet Nature Reserve
- IUCN category Ia (strict nature reserve)
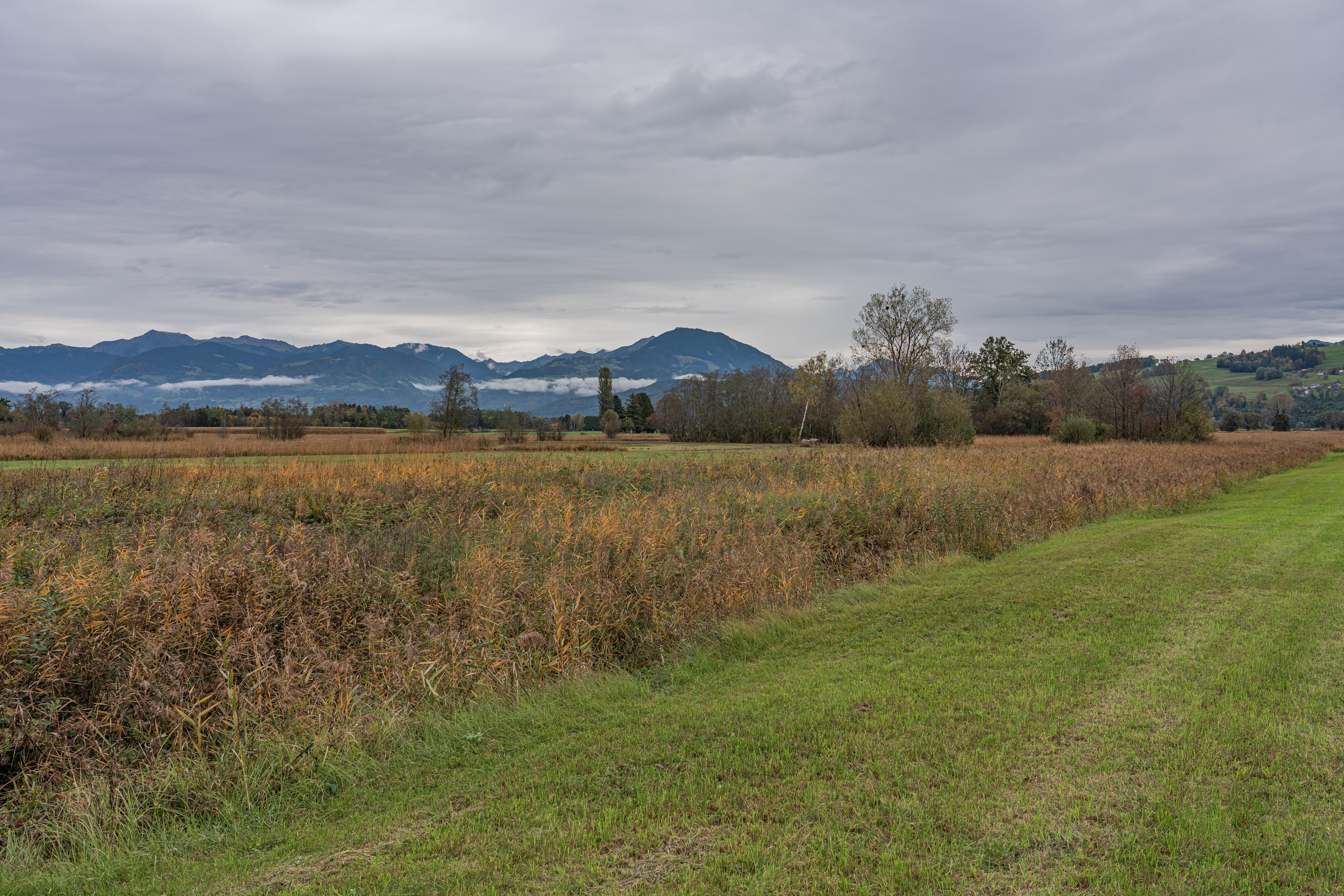

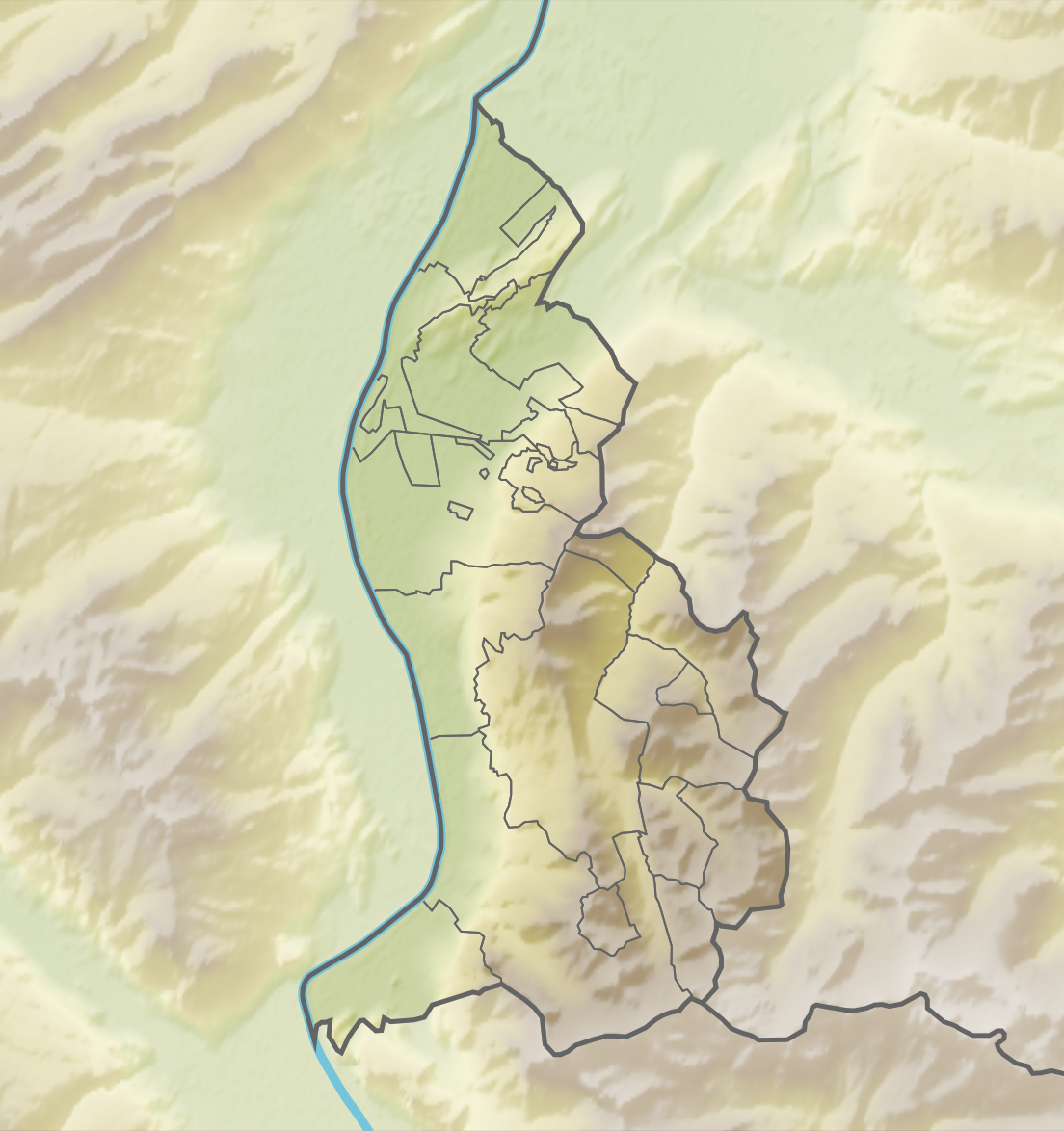
- Location within Liechtenstein
- Location: Ruggell, Liechtenstein
- Coordinates: 47°15′18″N 9°32′42″E
- Area: 88 ha (220 acres)
- Designated: 1978

Ramsar Wetland
- Official name: Ruggeller Riet
- Designated: 6 August 1991
- Reference no.: 529

Wild Siberian iris (Iris sibirica) in June

Ruggeller Riet Nature Reserve is a national nature reserve in Ruggell municipality, Liechtenstein. Located near the country's northern tripoint with Austria and Switzerland, Ruggeller Riet includes 88 hectares (220 acres) of wet meadows and moorland in the valley of the Alpine Rhine. The reserve was designated in 1978, and it has been protected as a Ramsar site since 1991.

== History ==
The name "Ruggeller Riet" is thought to refer to reeds that likely covered the region before the advent of intensive agriculture. The wetlands in this region of the Alpine Rhine valley began as shallow lakes formed after the melting of the Rhine Glacier some 16,500 years ago. Over time, silt deposition from the Rhine led to the development of bogs and the formation of peat. Pollen profiles show signs of human presence in the area as early as the 4th millennium BCE, and artifacts dating from the Bronze Age and Iron Age have been recovered from the peat. Since the late Middle Ages the area has been used for pasture and hay mowing by local farmers. A peat-cutting industry developed in the nineteenth century but declined after World War II.

== Flora and fauna ==
Ruggeller Riet is a complex of wet meadows situated atop a thick bed of peat in the most northerly region of Liechtenstein, at a relatively low (for Liechtenstein) elevation of around 430 metres (1,410 ft) above mean sea level. The dominant plant species include purple moor grass, brown bog-rush, and great fen-sedge, and other common species include crested wood fern, gladiolus, and Siberian iris.

The wetlands provide a stopover site supporting migratory birds, including storks. The site has been designated an Important Bird Area (IBA) by BirdLife International because it supports breeding corn crakes, common quails, whinchats and red-backed shrikes, as well as wintering hen harriers, and western marsh and Montagu's harriers on passage.

=== Conservation ===
Ruggeller Riet was designated as a national nature reserve by the Principality of Liechtenstein in 1978. The reserve covers roughly 88 hectares (220 acres) of wetland and moorland near the east bank of the Alpine Rhine. On 6 August 1991 the reserve was declared Liechtenstein's first and only Ramsar site when Liechtenstein acceded to the Ramsar Convention.
