= Katrin Kirpu =

Estonian footballer (born 2004)

Personal information
- Date of birth: 9 October 2004 (age 22)
- Position: Striker

Team information
- Current team: HJK

Senior career*
Years	Team	Apps	(Gls)
2022	HJK		
2024-2025	Åland United	42	(3)
2025-	Agram	6	(5)

International career^{‡}
2022–	Estonia	31	(4)
- * Club domestic league appearances and goals as of 14 April 2026 ‡ National team caps and goals as of 9 June 2026

Katrin Kirpu (born 9 October 2004) is an Estonian footballer who plays as a striker for LASK

== Early life ==
As a youth player, Kirpu joined the youth academy of Finnish side HJK, helping the club win the under-18 league.

== Club career ==
Kirpu was promoted to the HJK senior team during the 2022 season and was part of the squad that achieved second place.

Kirpu played for ŽNK Agram in Croatia during the 2024/25 season.

Kirpu joined ÖFB-Frauen Bundesliga team LASK on 7th July 2026.

== International career ==
In 2022, Kirpu debuted for the Estonia women's national football team during a 2–1 win over the Montenegro women's national football team.

== International goals ==
No.	Date	Venue	Opponent	Score	Result	Competition
1.	17 July 2023	Kadriorg Stadium, Tallinn, Estonia	Turkey	2–2	2–2	Friendly
2.	25 February 2025	Alcufer Stadion, Győr, Hungary	Israel	1–2	1–3	2025 UEFA Women's Nations League
3.	14 April 2026	Lilleküla Stadium, Tallinn, Estonia	Liechtenstein	2–1	2–1	2027 FIFA Women's World Cup qualification
4.	5 June 2026	Rheinpark Stadion, Vaduz, Liechtenstein	Liechtenstein	2–0	5–0	2027 FIFA Women's World Cup qualification

== Style of play ==
Kirpu mainly operates as a striker.

== Personal life ==
Kirpu attended Sotung High School in Finland.
