= Nadine Böhi =

Swiss footballer (born 2003)

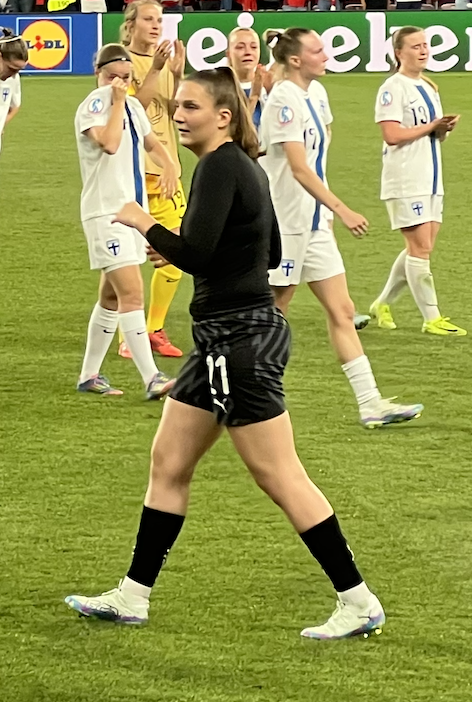
- Böhi with Switzerland in 2025

Personal information
- Full name: Nadine Katja Böhi
- Date of birth: 21 November 2003 (age 22)
- Height: 1.78 m (5 ft 10 in)
- Position: Goalkeeper

Team information
- Current team: 1. FC Union Berlin
- Number: 28

Youth career
- 2010–2016: Niederwil
- 2016–2020: St. Gallen

Senior career*
Years	Team	Apps	(Gls)
2020–2025	St. Gallen	66	(0)
2025–	1. FC Union Berlin	15	(0)
2025–	1. FC Union Berlin II	5	(0)

International career^{‡}
2019	Switzerland U16	3	(0)
2019	Switzerland U17	1	(0)
2021–2022	Switzerland U19	3	(0)
- * Club domestic league appearances and goals as of 20 November 2026 ‡ National team caps and goals as of 5 May 2026

Nadine Katja Böhi (born 21 November 2003) is a Swiss professional footballer who plays as a goalkeeper for Frauen-Bundesliga club 1. FC Union Berlin.

== Club career ==
Böhi began her career at Swiss Women's Super League club St. Gallen in 2020. In 2025, Böhi signed for Frauen-Bundesliga club Union Berlin.

== International career ==
Böhi was part of Switzerland's 23-player squad for the UEFA Women's Euro 2025, held on home soil.
