= Eva Beck =

Liechtensteiner footballer

Personal information
- Date of birth: 25 November 1997 (age 28)
- Positions: Midfielder; striker

Team information
- Current team: Oerlikon

Youth career
- 2009–2017: Zürich

Senior career*
Years	Team	Apps	(Gls)
2018–2019	Oerlikon		
2019–2022	Walperswil	35	(3)
2022–2023	Biel-Bienne		
2023–	Oerlikon	6	(0)

International career^{‡}
2021–	Liechtenstein	7	(0)
- * Club domestic league appearances and goals as of 6 June 2026 ‡ National team caps and goals as of 10 October 2026

Eva Beck (born 25 November 1997) is a Liechtensteiner footballer who plays as a midfielder for Oerlikon and the Liechtenstein national football team.

== Career statistics ==
=== International ===
Liechtenstein
Year	Apps	Goals
2021	4	0
2022	0	0
2023	0	0
2024	1	0
2025	0	0
2026	2	0
Total	7	0
