= Elis Eiler =

Liechtensteiner footballer

Personal information
- Date of birth: 13 August 1990 (age 36)
- Position: Midfielder

Team information
- Current team: FC Staad

Youth career
- –2004: FC Rot-Weiß Rankweil
- 2004–2006: FC Koblach
- 2006–2008: FC Ruggell

Senior career*
Years	Team	Apps	(Gls)
2008–2010	FC Widnau		
2010–2012	FC Staad	6	(0)
2012–2022	FC Rot-Weiß Rankweil	28	(7)
2022–	FC Staad		

International career^{‡}
2021–	Liechtenstein	13	(0)
- * Club domestic league appearances and goals as of 6 June 2026 ‡ National team caps and goals as of 5 June 2026

Elis Eiler (born 13 August 1990) is a Liechtensteiner footballer who plays as a midfielder for FC Staad and the Liechtenstein national football team.

Eiler previously played in the Swiss Women's Super League in her first stint with Staad and in the 2. ÖFB Frauen Bundesliga for Rot-Weiß Rankweil.

== Career statistics ==
=== International ===
Liechtenstein
Year	Apps	Goals
2021	1	0
2022	2	0
2023	0	0
2024	2	0
2025	3	0
2026	5	0
Total	13	0
