= Jana Brunner =

Swiss footballer (born 1997)

Personal information
- Date of birth: 20 January 1997 (age 29)
- Place of birth: Heiden, Switzerland
- Height: 1.78 m (5 ft 10 in)
- Position: Defender

Team information
- Current team: St. Gallen
- Number: 14

Youth career
- Altstätten
- Staad

Senior career*
Years	Team	Apps	(Gls)
2012–2017	Staad	72	(2)
2017–2021	Basel	84	(1)
2021–	St. Gallen	30	(2)

International career^{‡}
2016	Switzerland U19	7	(0)
2017–	Switzerland	14	(1)
- * Club domestic league appearances and goals as of 29 July 2023 ‡ National team caps and goals as of 29 July 2023

Jana Brunner (born 20 January 1997) is a Swiss footballer who plays for St. Gallen and the Switzerland national team.

She played for Switzerland at UEFA Women's Euro 2017.

== Honours ==
Basel

- Swiss Super League; runner-up: 2017/18

St. Gallen

- Swiss Cup; runner-up: 2022/23
