= Julia Benneckenstein =

Liechtenstein footballer (born 2000)

Personal information
- Date of birth: 8 March 2000 (age 26)
- Place of birth: Liechtenstein
- Height: 1.75 m (5 ft 9 in)
- Position: Defender

Team information
- Current team: Wil
- Number: 13

College career
Years	Team	Apps	(Gls)
2022–2023	Itawamba Indians		
2024–2026	Jefferson Rams	23	(0)

Senior career*
Years	Team	Apps	(Gls)
2026–	Wil	5	(0)

International career^{‡}
2021–	Liechtenstein	26	(0)
- * Club domestic league appearances and goals as of 8 October 2026 ‡ National team caps and goals as of 10 October 2026

Julia Benneckenstein (born 8 March 2000) is a Liechtenstein professional footballer who plays as a defender for Wil in the Swiss Nationalliga B.

== Early life ==
Benneckenstein was born on 8 March 2000 in Liechtenstein. The daughter of Wolfgang and Carmen, she is the younger sister of Constantin.

Growing up, she attended Itawamba Community College in the United States. Following her stint there, she attended Thomas Jefferson University in the United States.

== Club career ==
Benneckenstein played for Swiss side FC Wil, helping the club achieve promotion from the third tier to the second tier.

She would return to Wil upon completion of her studies in the United States in time for the 2026/2027 season.

== International career ==
Benneckenstein is a Liechtenstein international. During February, April, May, and June 2025, she played for the Liechtenstein women's national football team for the 2025 UEFA Women's Nations League C.
