= Joy Steck =

Liechtensteiner footballer

Personal information
- Full name: Joy Steck
- Date of birth: 18 August 2003 (age 23)
- Position: Forward

Team information
- Current team: Aarau
- Number: 17

Youth career
- 2008–2014: FC Meisterschwanden
- 2014–2017: SC Seengen
- 2017–2019: Aarau

Senior career*
Years	Team	Apps	(Gls)
2019–	Aarau	102	(13)

International career^{‡}
2026–	Liechtenstein	7	(1)
- * Club domestic league appearances and goals as of 6 June 2026 ‡ National team caps and goals as of 10 October 2026

Joy Steck (born 18 August 2003) is a Liechtensteiner footballer who plays as a forward for the Swiss Women's Super League club Aarau and the Liechtenstein national football team.

== Career ==
Steck made her professional debut for Aarau on 1 December 2019 in a Nationalliga B match against FC Schlieren.

She made her Swiss top-flight debut on 21 August 2021 against St. Gallen.

Steck's senior international debut for Liechtenstein came in a 2027 FIFA Women's World Cup qualification match against Lithuania on 3 March 2026.

== Career statistics ==
=== International ===
Liechtenstein
Year	Apps	Goals
2026	7	1
Total	7	1

=== International goals ===
#	Date	Venue	Opponent	Score	Result	Competition
1.	14 April 2026	Lilleküla Stadium, Tallinn, Estonia	Estonia	1–1	1–2	2027 FIFA Women's World Cup qualification
