= Euseigne =

- Village
- View of Euseigne from Saint-Martin

- Location of Euseigne in Switzerland Euseigne (Canton of Valais)
- Coordinates: 46°10′20″N 7°25′22″E
- Country: Switzerland
- Canton: Valais
- District: Hérens
- Municipality: Hérémence
- Elevation: 3,212 ft (979 m)
- Demonym: Les Euseignards

Languages
  - Official: French
- Time zone: UTC+1 (CET)
  - Summer (DST): UTC+2 (CEST)
- Postal code: 1982

Euseigne is a village in the Swiss Alps, located in the canton of Valais. The village is situated in the central part of the canton, in the Val d'Hérens, south of Sion. It belongs to the municipality of Hérémence. Euseigne lies at a height of 979 metres (3212 feet) above sea level, on the main road connecting Evolène from Sion. The village is well known for the hoodoo rock formations (also known as fairy chimneys) named Pyramides d'Euseigne.

Aerial view (1955)

== Situation ==
Situated at the split between val d'Hérens and Val d'Hérémence, it belongs to the district of Hérens, in Hérémence commune.

Euseigne is at 979 metres (3,212 ft) above sea level, on the left bank of the Borgnes river, and the right bank of the Dixence river.

== The Pyramids ==
The village is famous for its hoodoo rock formations named Pyramides d'Euseigne. These are relatively small natural reliefs, between 10 and 15 meters tall, which were formed by the deterioration of moraines. They are topped by large stones. Thanks to their relatively big weight, these boulders protect the pyramids from rain erosion and by compressing the underlying moraine. These pyramids were shaped after the last glaciation, and after the disappearance of the glaciers which were overwhelming Hérémence and Hérens valleys, between 10.000 and 80.000 years ago. The main road of the valley goes through a small tunnel dug under these rock formations.

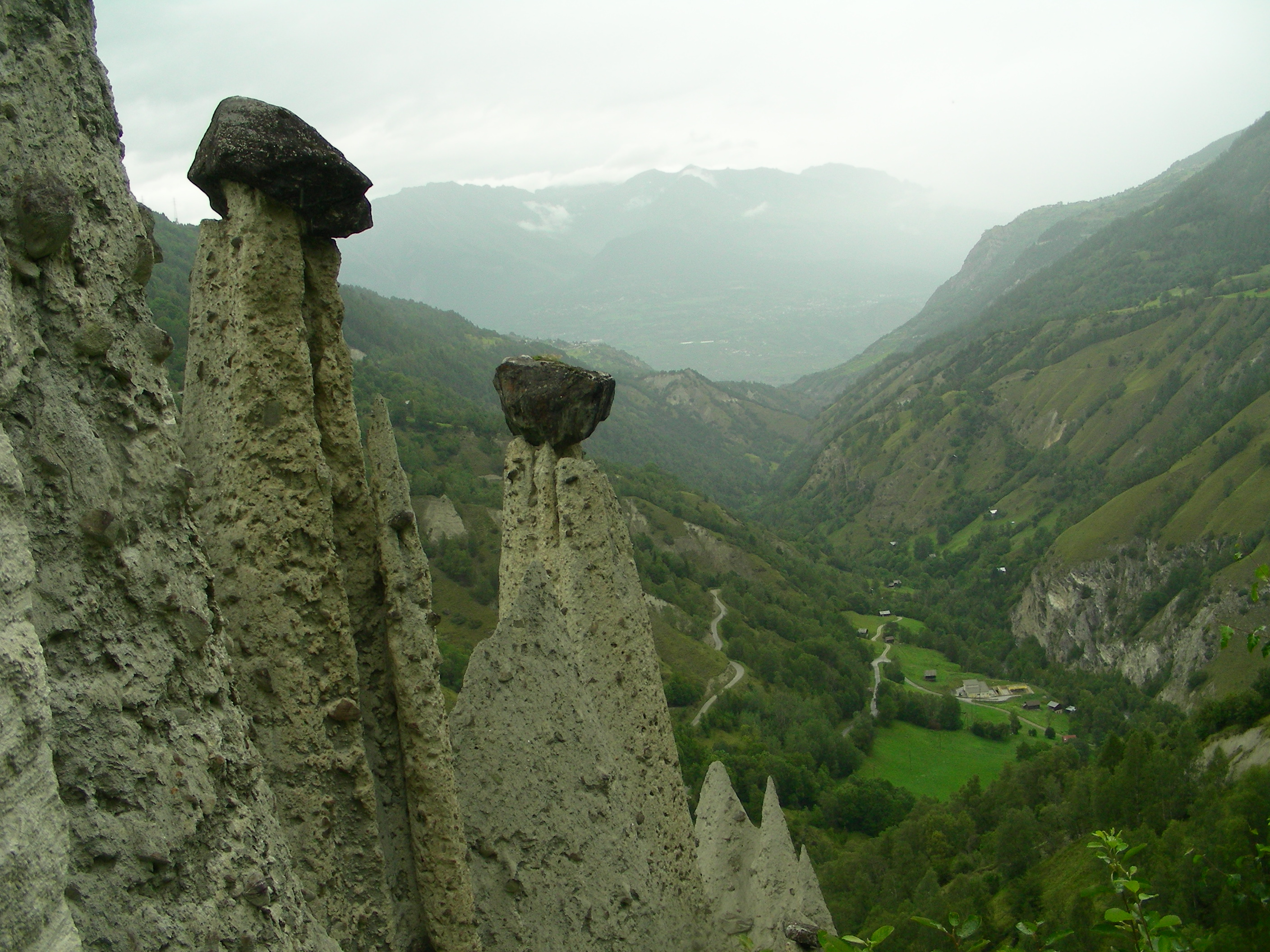
The Pyramides d'Euseigne

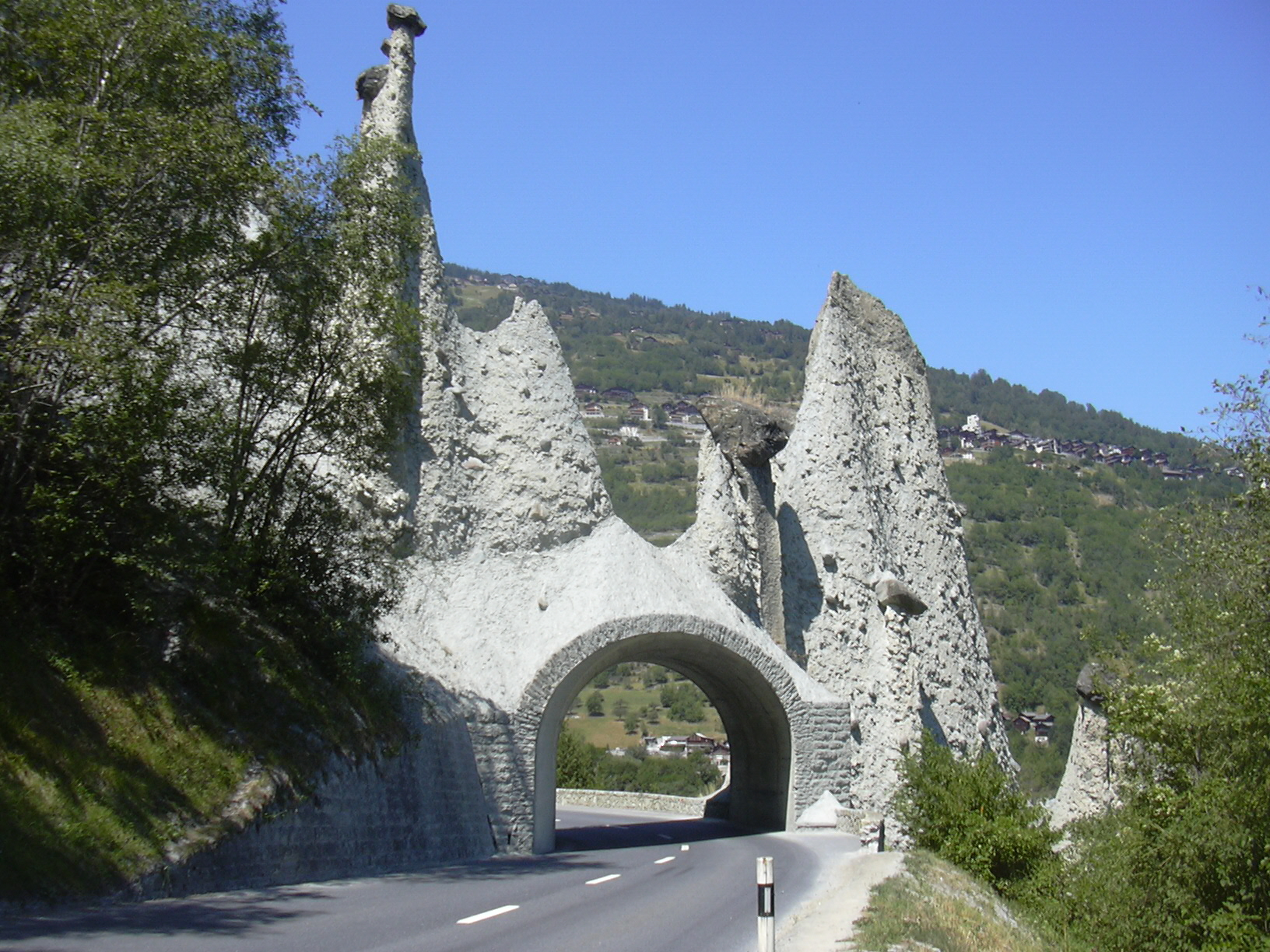
View of Euseigne pyramids
