= Elena Lohner =

Liechtensteiner footballer

Personal information
- Date of birth: 19 July 2001 (age 25)
- Position: Defender

Team information
- Current team: Triesen

Youth career
- 2013–2016: Triesenberg

Senior career*
Years	Team	Apps	(Gls)
2017–	Triesen		

International career^{‡}
2016–2017	Liechtenstein U-16	6	(0)
2018	Liechtenstein U-19	3	(0)
2021–	Liechtenstein	25	(0)
- * Club domestic league appearances and goals as of 15 April 2021 ‡ National team caps and goals as of 10 October 2026

Elena Lohner (born 19 July 2001) is a Liechtensteiner footballer who plays as a defender for Triesen and the Liechtenstein national football team.

== Career statistics ==
=== International ===
Liechtenstein
Year	Apps	Goals
2021	6	0
2022	3	0
2023	0	0
2024	2	0
2025	7	0
2026	7	0
Total	25	0
