= Sportanlage Rheinwiese =

Football stadium in Schaan, Liechtenstein

- Interactive map of Sportanlage Rheinwiese
- Location: Schaan, Liechtenstein
- Coordinates: 47°9′55.8″N 9°29′33.36″E
- Capacity: 1,500
- Surface: Grass

Tenant
- FC Schaan

Sportanlage Rheinwiese is a football stadium in Schaan, Liechtenstein. It is the home of FC Schaan and has a capacity of 1,500.

== See also ==
- List of football stadiums in Liechtenstein
