= Sportanlage Blumenau =

Football stadium in Triesen, Liechtenstein

- Interactive map of Sportanlage Blumenau
- Location: Triesen, Liechtenstein
- Coordinates: 47°6′36.72″N 9°31′10.2″E
- Capacity: 2,100
- Surface: Grass

Tenant
- FC Triesen

Sportanlage Blumenau is a football stadium in Triesen, Liechtenstein. It has a capacity of 2,100 and is the home of FC Triesen.

== See also ==
- List of football stadiums in Liechtenstein
