= Freizeitpark Widau =

Football stadium in Ruggell, Liechtenstein

- Interactive map of Freizeitpark Widau
- Location: Ruggell, Liechtenstein
- Coordinates: 47°14′39.12″N 9°31′25.68″E
- Capacity: 500
- Surface: Grass

Construction
- Opened: 2002

Tenant
- FC Ruggell

Freizeitpark Widau is a football stadium in Ruggell, Liechtenstein. It is the home ground of FC Ruggell and has a capacity of 500.

== See also ==
- List of football stadiums in Liechtenstein
