= Sportpark Eschen-Mauren =

Multi-sport complex in Eschen, Liechtenstein

Coordinates: 47°12′21″N 9°32′16″E

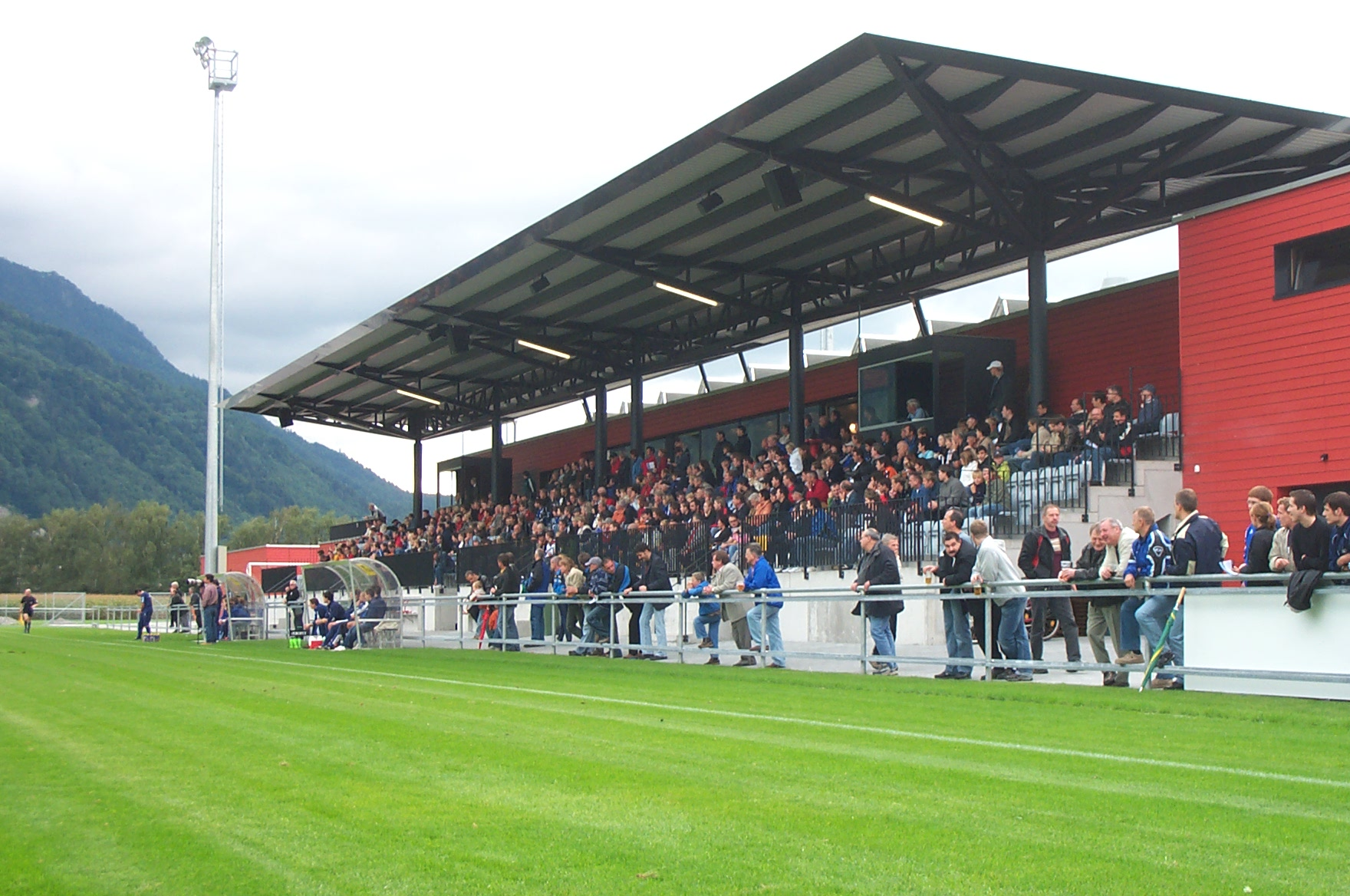
- Sportpark Eschen-Mauren
- Interactive map of Sportpark Eschen-Mauren
- Address: Rheinstrasse 30
- Location: Eschen, Liechtenstein
- Capacity: 2000 (500 seats)
- Type: Multi-use stadium
- Field size: 105 x 68 m

Construction
- Opened: 1975

Tenant
- USV Eschen/Mauren

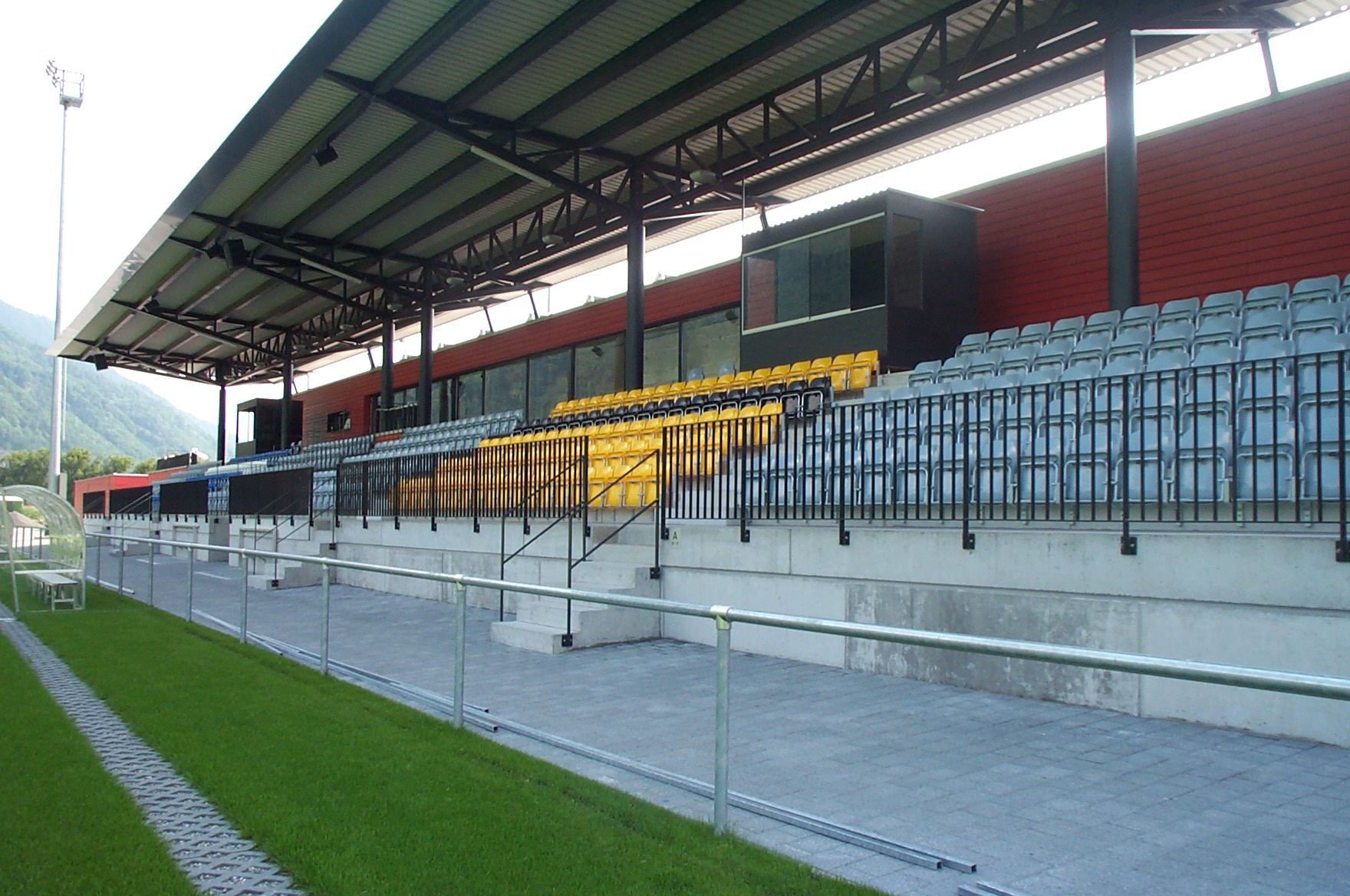
Grandstand of Sportpark Eschen-Mauren

Sportpark Eschen-Mauren is a multi-sport complex in Eschen, Liechtenstein. It is used mostly for football matches and is the home ground of USV Eschen/Mauren as well as the Liechtenstein national youth football teams. It was the national stadium of Liechtenstein national football team until 1998 when the Rheinpark Stadion in Vaduz opened. Sportpark Eschen-Mauren, opened in 1975, has 500 covered seats and a total capacity of 2000.

The stadium featured three group stage matches at the 2003 UEFA European Under-19 Championship and six group stage matches at the 2010 UEFA European Under-17 Championship.
