= Rheinpark Stadion =

National stadium of Liechtenstein

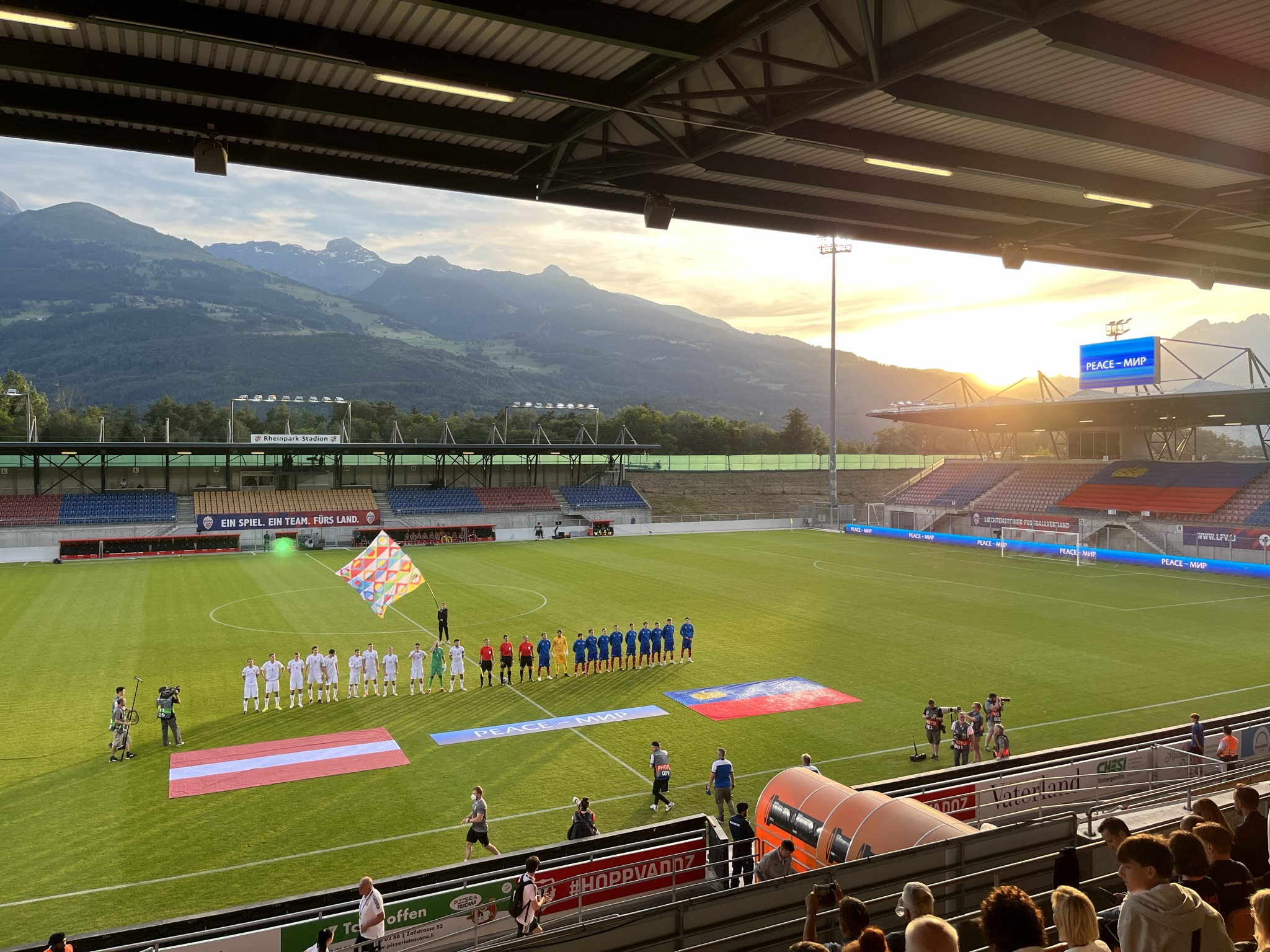
- Interactive map of Rheinpark Stadion
- Location: Vaduz, Liechtenstein
- Coordinates: 47°08′25″N 9°30′37″E
- Capacity: 7,584 (5,873 seated)
- Field size: 105 × 68 m

Construction
- Groundbreaking: 1 July 1997
- Opened: 31 July 1998
- Expanded: 2006
- Cost: CHF 19 million

Tenants
- FC Vaduz; Liechtenstein national football team

Rheinpark Stadion (Rhine Park Stadium) in Vaduz is the national stadium of Liechtenstein. It plays host to home matches of the Liechtenstein national football team, and is also the home of football club FC Vaduz. It lies on the banks of the river Rhine, just metres from the border with Switzerland.

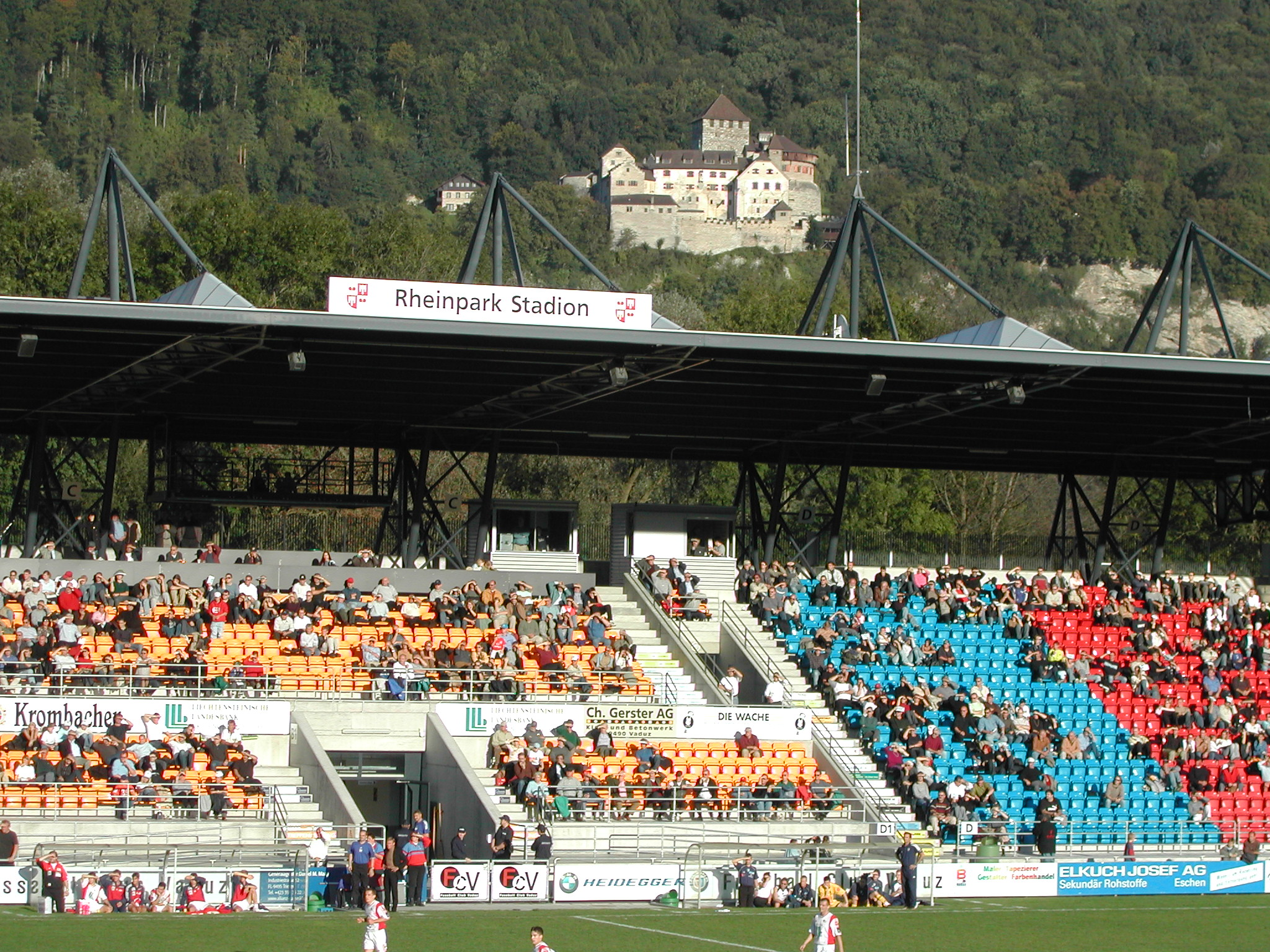
Main stand of the Rheinpark Stadion with Vaduz Castle behind

Rheinpark was officially opened on 31 July 1998 with a match between FC Vaduz, the Liechtenstein Cup holders at the time, and 1. FC Kaiserslautern, the then Bundesliga champions. 1. FC Kaiserslautern won 8–0.

The stadium has a seating capacity of 5,873, with additional standing room giving it a total capacity of 7,584. The stadium cost 19 million CHF to construct.

In 2006, the stadium was upgraded with the South and North grandstands gaining covers, and improvements to the training facilities. In June 2007, the stadium hosted concerts by Clueso and Herbert Grönemeyer.

== See also ==
- List of football stadiums in Liechtenstein
