= Ruggell =

- Municipality
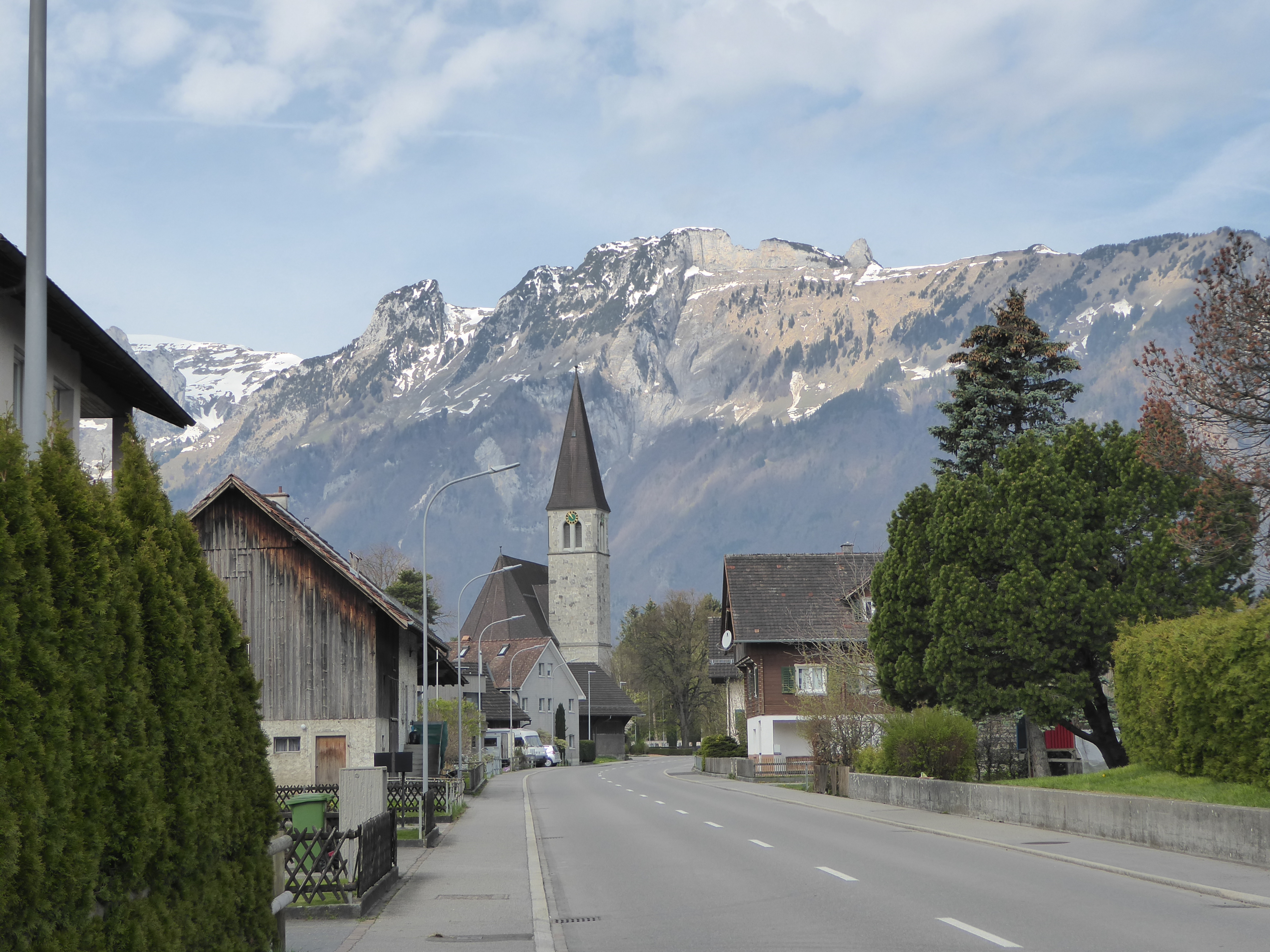
- Schellenbergstrasse, with the Ruggell Parish Church and Kreuzberge mountain in the background

- Flag Coat of arms
- Interactive map of Ruggell
- Coordinates: 47°14′36″N 9°31′48″E
- Country: Liechtenstein
- Electoral district: Unterland
- Villages: None

Government
  - Mayor: Christian Öhri (FBP)

Area
  - Total: 7.38 km^{2} (2.85 sq mi)
- Elevation: 433 m (1,421 ft)

Population (31-12-2019)
  - Total: 2,322
  - Density: 315/km^{2} (815/sq mi)
- Time zone: UTC+1 (CET)
  - Summer (DST): CEST
- Postal code: 9491
- Area code: 7010
- ISO 3166 code: LI-06
- Website: www.ruggell.li

Ruggell (Swiss Standard German pronunciation: [ruˈɡɛl]; dialectal: Ruggäll) is a municipality of Liechtenstein. It is the northernmost and lowest elevated municipality. As of 2019, it has a population of 2,322.

== History ==
Ruggell has an ancient history, with evidence of human activity preceding the Bronze Age. Recorded history begins with ties related to the Abbey of Saint Gall in Switzerland. The name comes from Old Romansh runcaglia, meaning "clearing". It is most known for conservation areas and the historic St. Fridolin's Parish Church.

Ruggell had 397 inhabitants in 1784. A bridge across the Rhine (to Salez in Sennwald, Switzerland) was built in 1929.

== Administration ==
Ruggell is administered by the mayor and a 8-person municipal council, elected every four years since 1975. The incumbent mayor is Christian Öhri, since 2023.

=== Last election ===
Party	Votes	%	Seats	+/–
Progressive Citizens' Party	4,284	51.64	4	0
Patriotic Union	4,012	48.36	4	0
Total	8,296	100.00	8	0
Valid votes	1,037	93.51		
Invalid votes	48	4.33		
Blank votes	24	2.16		
Total votes	1,109	100.00		
Registered voters/turnout	1,360	81.54		
Source: Gemeindewahlen

== Geography ==
Ruggell borders the Liechtenstein municipalities of Gamprin and Schellenberg. While Liechtenstein is known as a largely mountainous country, Ruggell is largely flat and is situated along the Rhine River, where the international borders with Switzerland and Austria meet. On 13 August 2003, Ruggell had a temperature of 37.4 °C (99.3 °F), which is the highest temperature recorded in Liechtenstein. Ruggell is the northernmost municipality of the Principality.

== Flora and fauna ==
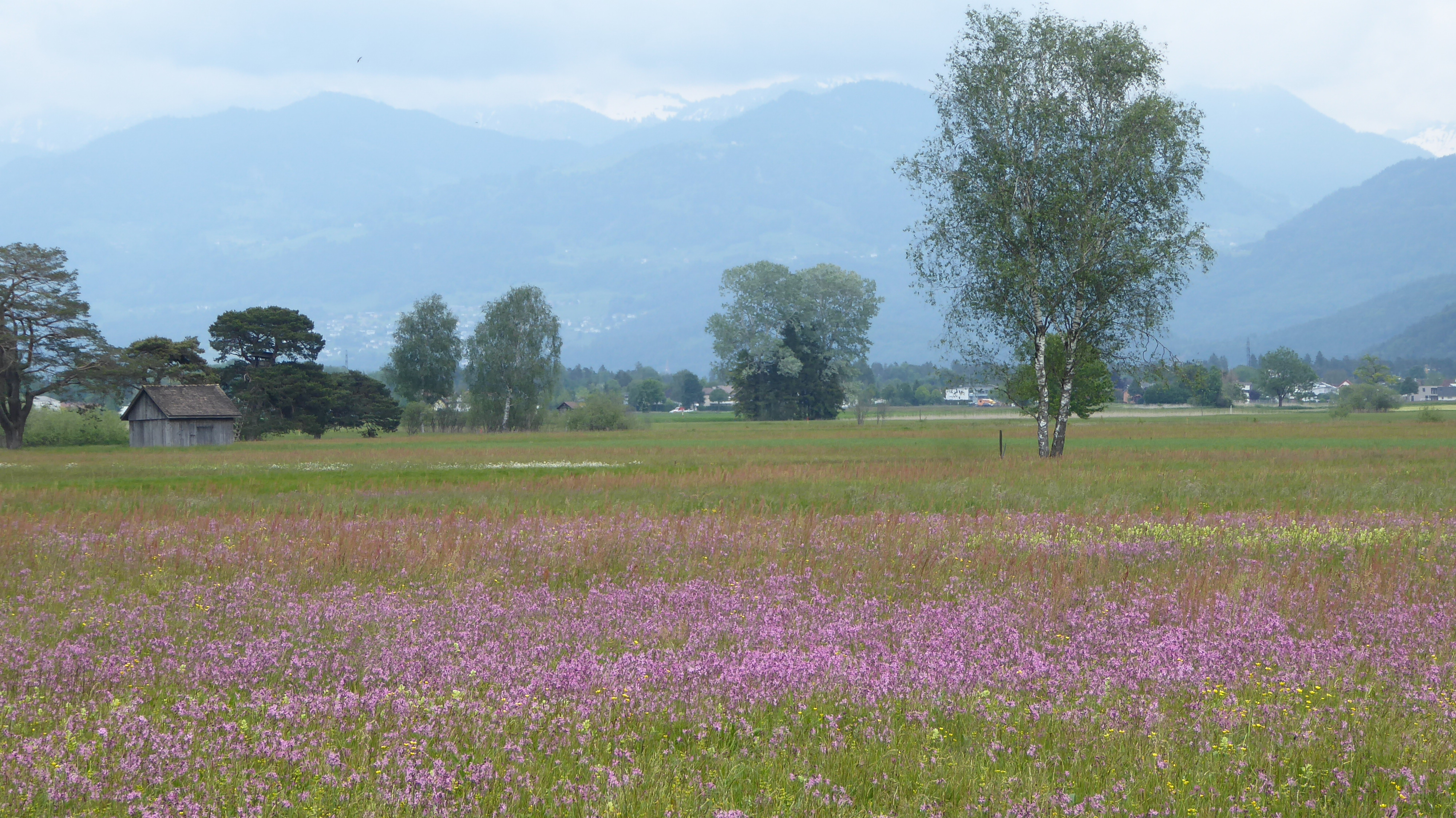
Ruggeller Riet

On the north side of the Eschnerberg mountain is located the roughly 90-hectare nature reserve Ruggeller Riet, which is rich in fauna and especially in flora, with 736 plant and 1,631 animal species occurring in the Ruggeller Riet. The great biodiversity of the Ruggeller Riets includes peat moss, moor grass, Kleinseggenrieder and bogrush. At the end of May to June, the siberian iris blooms in the large parts of the nature reserve. The white stork and the Eurasian curlew, which has disappeared as a breeding bird since 1997, live in the area.

The Ruggeller are popularly called "Lättaknätter". The loamy soil that occurs here is called "Lätta". In the past peat was used to heat houses during cold season. This ancient tradition has increasingly disappeared in recent years.

== Sport ==
Municipality is famous for FC Ruggell, one of the best teams in the country, although it plays in the sixth division of Switzerland. In other sporting areas cycling, field hockey, skiing, and other winter sports stand out. In addition, the town of Ruggell has one of the four sports halls of Liechtenstein; the others are in Schaan, Vaduz, and Balzers.

== Notable people ==
- Klaus Tschütscher (born 1967) a politician from Liechtenstein, twelfth Prime Minister of Liechtenstein 2009–2013, lives in Ruggell.
- Marcel Tschopp (born 1974 in Ruggell) a Liechtensteiner orienteer and track athlete, specializing in the marathon; was Liechtenstein's flag bearer for the opening ceremony of the 2008 Summer Olympics
- Benjamin Büchel (born 1989 in Ruggell) international footballer who plays for FC Vaduz.
