= FC St. Gallen Frauen =

Swiss football club

- Nickname: Espen
- Founded: 2017
- Ground: Espenmoos
- Capacity: 5,700
- Chairman: Matthias Hüppi
- Manager: Marisa Wunderlin
- League: Swiss Women's Super League
- 2025–26: Swiss Women's Super League 6th of 10
Home colours	Away colours

FC St. Gallen Frauen (formerly known as FC St.Gallen-Staad) is a women's football club from Switzerland. The club was founded in 2017 and was created through the merger of the women's football departments of FC St. Gallen and FC Staad. After the team was already integrated into the organization of FC St. Gallen in February 2021, the name "FC St.Gallen-Staad" was changed to "FC St. Gallen Frauen" in Summer 2022. The team currently competes in the Swiss Women's Super League, the highest division of the Swiss football pyramid.

== History ==
The women's division of FC Staad has existed since 1992. In 2001, it was promoted to the National League A for the first time. After two more relegations and re-promotions in 2003 and 2009, the team slipped again into the National League B in 2017. The women of FC St. Gallen were relegated to National League B in 2016.

With the relegation of the women of FC Staad, no team from Eastern Switzerland was represented in the top division of Swiss women's football, so the two clubs decided to join forces and merge their women's departments. The first joint training session was in July 2017. This merger, which had already been preceded by a certain cooperation at youth levels, also affected the U15, U17 and U19 teams, which have all competed under the name FC St. Gallen-Staad since then.

In its first season of 2017/18, FC St. Gallen-Staad landed in third place and just missed promotion from National League B. The club started the 2018/19 season under head coach Federico D'Aloia and went on to win promotion to National League A. In the Swiss Cup, St. Gallen-Staad reached the semifinals.

Marco Zwyssig replaced D'Aloia as head coach. The 2019/20 season was ultimately cancelled due to the coronavirus pandemic. At the time of cancellation, after 16 rounds, FC St. Gallen-Staad stood in 7th place on 11 points.

Before the start of the 20/21 season, the cooperation between FC St. Gallen and FC Staad was extended until 2023.

On August 13, St. Gallen-Staad won the season opening game of the newly founded Women's Super League in Kybunpark, which was broadcast live by SRF2, against Grasshopper Club Zürich, 2–0. It was the first game in the top division of Swiss women's football that SRF had ever shown.

In March 2021 it was announced that the club would part with Marco Zwyssig as head coach at the end of the season, with Marisa Wunderlin presented as successor.

In the cup, the team reached the round of 16, where they were eliminated at home against Basel.

The name "FC St. Gallen-Staad" was changed to "FC St.Gallen Frauen" in 2022 after the club was already a part of the FC St. Gallen organization since February 2021.

== Players ==
=== Current squad ===
As of 3 March 2024.

Note: Flags indicate national team as defined under FIFA eligibility rules; some limited exceptions apply. Players may hold more than one non-FIFA nationality.

No.	Pos.	Nation	Player
1	GK	SUI	Kim Bollmann
4	DF	GER	Rucy Grunenberg
5	DF	SUI	Naja Glanzmann
6	MF	SUI	Chantal Wyser
7	MF	SUI	Geraldine Ess
9	FW	SUI	Adelisa Hafizovic
10	FW	SUI	Stephanie Brecht
11	DF	GER	Franziska Gaus
13	DF	SUI	Karin Bernet
14	DF	SUI	Jana Brunner
15	MF	SUI	Alessandra de Freitas
16	DF	SUI	Larina Baumann
17	MF	SUI	Yael Aeberhard

No.	Pos.	Nation	Player
19	DF	SUI	Jasmin Colombo
21	FW	SUI	Fabienne Dörig
22	GK	SUI	Fabienne Oertle
23	FW	SUI	Serena Li Puma
24	MF	LIE	Katharina Risch
25	FW	SUI	Anna Sutter
26	DF	LIE	Fiona Batliner
28	MF	SUI	Noa Schärz
30	GK	SUI	Nadine Böhi
33	DF	SUI	Nerina Waldhart

== Former Players ==
- (Sweden) Sara Nilsson
