= Video assistant referee =

Association football official reviewing decisions

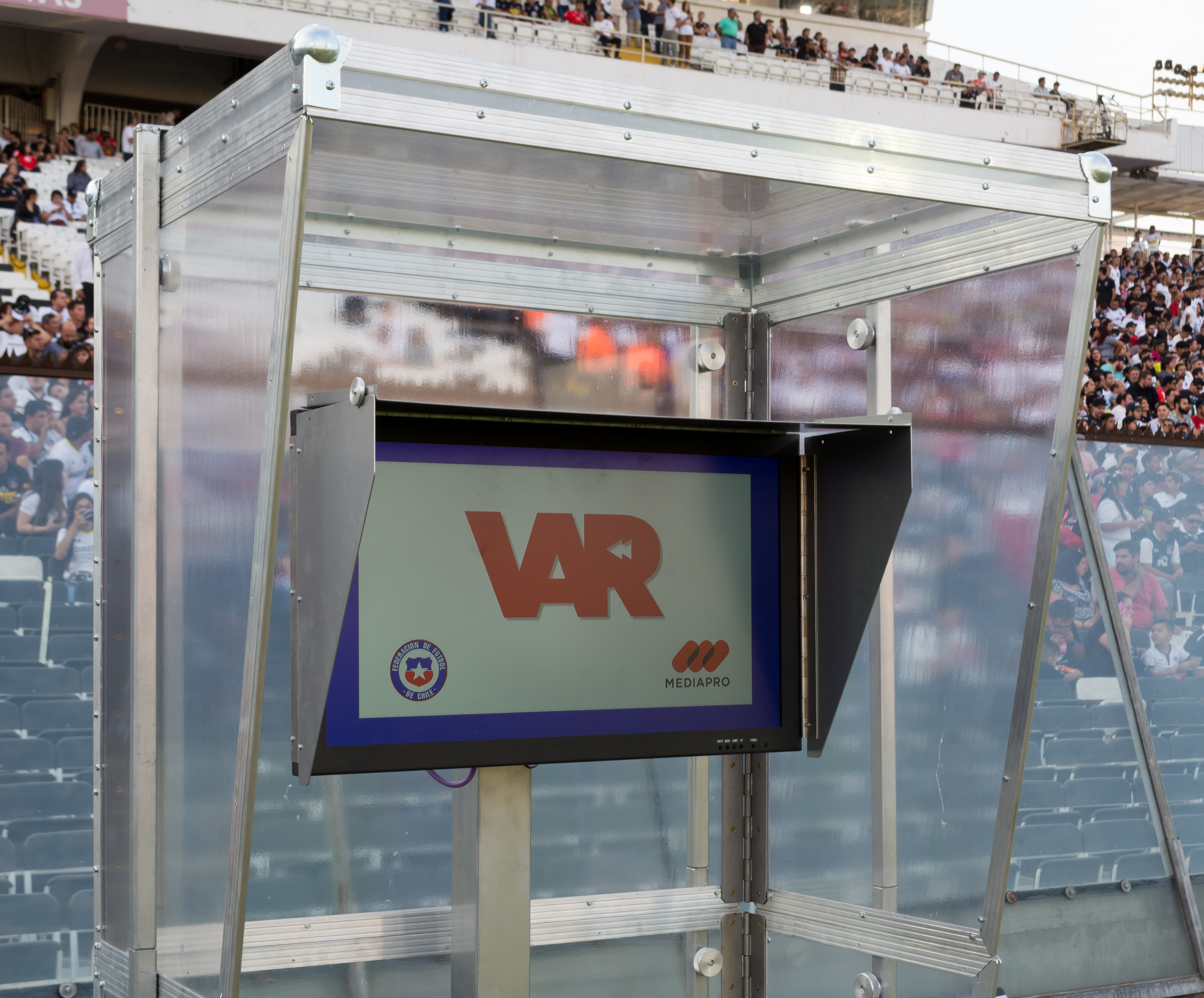
VAR monitor at the Estadio Monumental David Arellano in Santiago, Chile

The VAR symbol used at the 2018, 2022 and 2026 FIFA World Cups, appearing on-screen during the review process

The video assistant referee (VAR) is a match official in association football who assists the referee by reviewing decisions using video footage and providing advice to the referee based on those reviews.

The assistant video assistant referee (AVAR) is a match official appointed to assist the VAR in the video operation room and around the pitch. There are three AVARs (AVAR1, AVAR2, sometimes called the support video assistant referee, and AVAR3) who are assigned to different parts of the game that they are charged with reviewing and are in consistent communication with the VAR about possible situations that might warrant further review. The job of the AVAR1 is to watch the main camera and communicate some of the more obvious offenses within the game. The AVAR2 is located at the offside station and is responsible for assisting the VAR with offsides and reporting possible missed offside calls. The AVAR3 is responsible for monitoring the TV programs and assists in communication between the AVAR2 and the VAR since the AVAR2 is at the offside station.

In addition to the VAR and the AVARs there are three replay operators who help the VAR and AVARs select the cameras with the best angle.

Following extensive trialling in a number of major competitions, VAR was formally written into the Laws of the Game by the International Football Association Board (IFAB) on 3 March 2018. Operating under the philosophy of "minimal interference, maximum benefit", the VAR system seeks to provide a way for "clear and obvious errors" and "serious missed incidents" to be corrected.

== Procedure ==
There are four categories of decisions that can be reviewed.

- Goal/no goal – attacking team commits an offence, ball out of play, ball entering goal, offside, handball, offences and encroachment during penalty kicks.
- Penalty/no penalty – attacking team commits an offence, ball out of play, location of offence, incorrect awarding, offence not penalised.
- Direct red card – denial of obvious goal-scoring opportunity, serious foul play, violent conduct/biting/spitting, using offensive/insulting/abusive language or gestures.
- Mistaken identity in awarding a red or yellow card.

The original decision given by the referee will not be changed unless the video review clearly shows that the decision was a 'clear and obvious error.' The final decision is always taken by the referee, either based on information from the VAR or after the referee has undertaken an 'on field review' (OFR).

=== Check ===
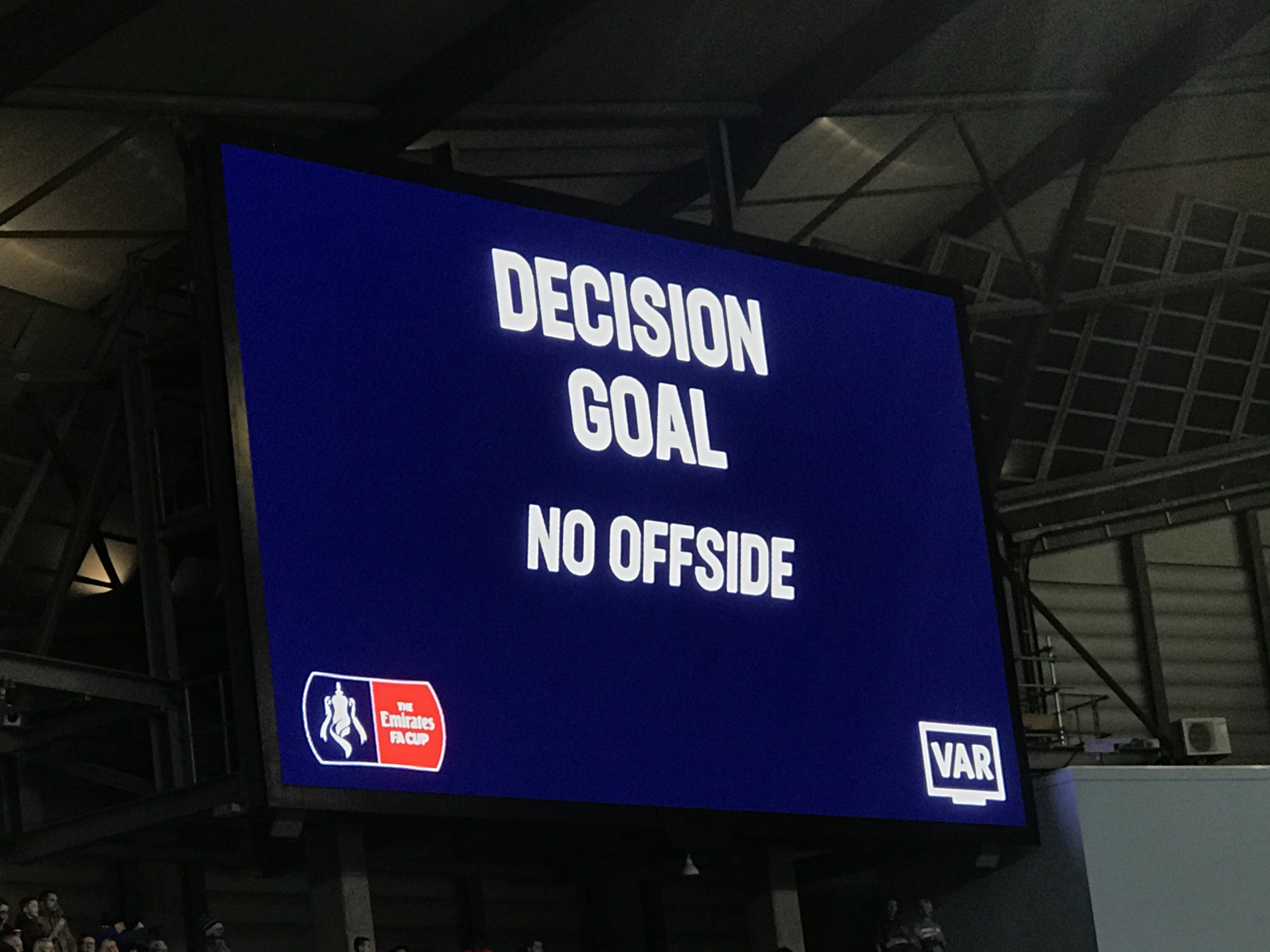
A VAR decision during an FA Cup match at the City of Manchester Stadium, Manchester.

The VAR and the AVARs automatically check every on-field referee decision falling under the four reviewable categories. The VAR may perform a "silent check," communicating to the referee that no mistake was made, while not causing any delay to the game. At other times, a VAR check may cause the game to be delayed while the VAR ascertains whether or not a possible mistake has occurred. The referee may delay the restart of play for this to occur, and indicates an ongoing check by pointing to their ear.

Where the VAR does identify a possible clear and obvious error, there are three possible scenarios:

- Decision overturned on advice of VAR
- On-field review (OFR) recommended
- Referee chooses to ignore VAR advice

A decision can generally be overturned without an OFR where it relates to a factual matter. For example, offside decisions or whether a foul occurred inside or outside the penalty area can be determined by the VAR to the referee without a review. VAR will recommend an OFR where there is a subjective decision to make, such as whether a foul was committed in the first place or whether a red card is warranted for a certain offence. In all cases, the final decision rests with the referee, and they can choose to ignore the advice of the VAR altogether.

=== On-field review (OFR) ===
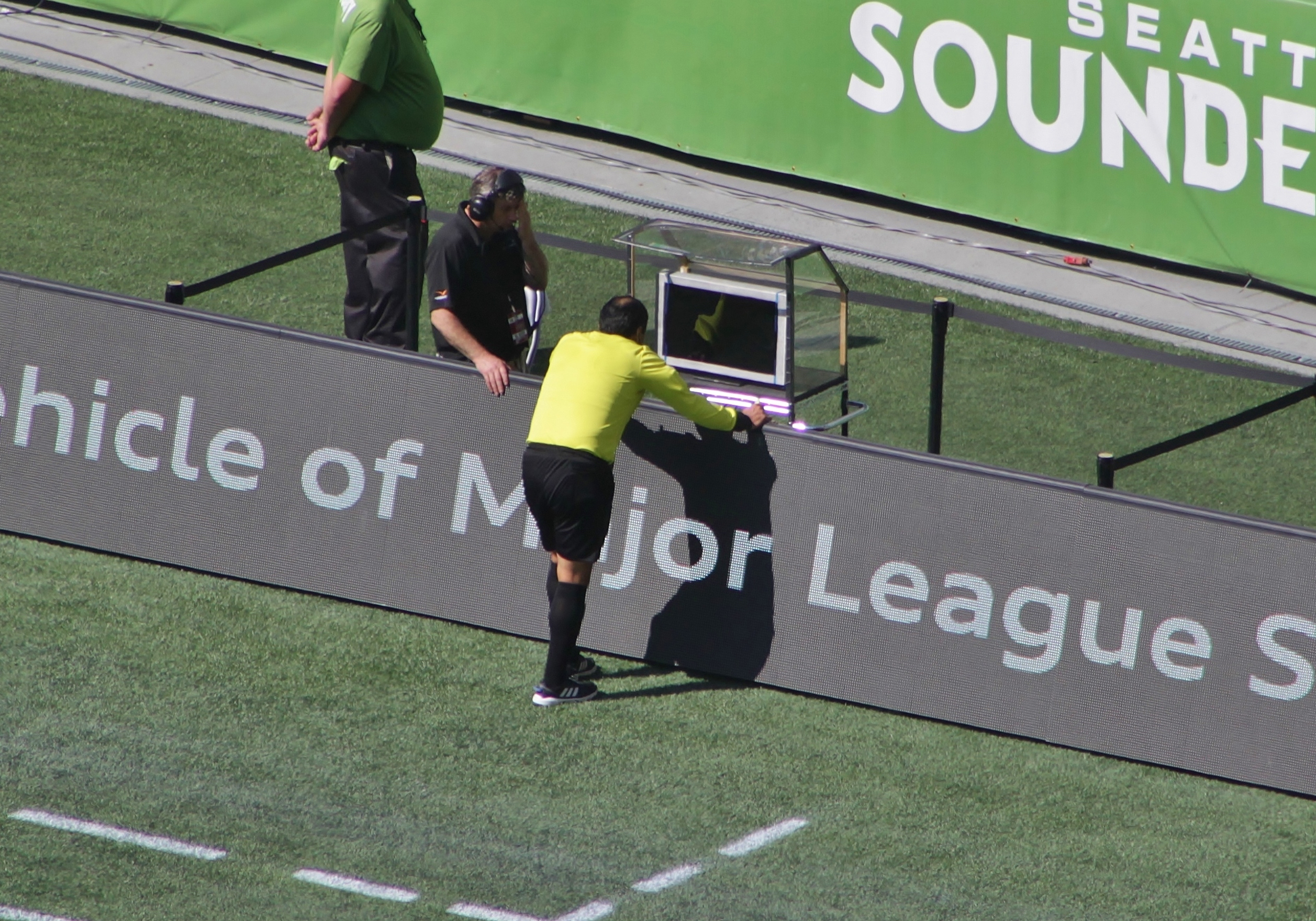
A Major League Soccer referee reviewing a play using a sideline monitor

An OFR can only be conducted on the recommendation of the VAR. This ensures that the referee always makes an on-field ruling and does not rely on OFRs for every close decision. An OFR can be conducted when the ball is out of play, or where the referee stops play for the express purpose of conducting one.

The referee signals an OFR by making the outline of a rectangle, indicating a video screen. The OFR takes place in a designated referee review area (RRA), adjacent to the field of play and in public view to ensure transparency. Slow motion replays are only used to establish point of contact for physical offences and handball, while full-speed replays are shown to determine the intensity of an offence or whether a handball occurred in the first place. During an OFR, the VAR transmits several video replays from different camera angles to assist the referee in making a decision.

Once an OFR is completed, the referee makes the TV signal again, before indicating the decision made. If the ball was out of play, it restarts with either the original decision or the new decision if the on-field one was changed. If play was stopped to conduct an OFR and the decision was not changed, a dropped ball occurs.

=== Offences ===
A number of offences relating to the VAR process are codified within the Laws of the Game. Both players and team officials can be cautioned for excessively protesting an on-field decision by making the TV signal. Any player or team official entering the RRA are also cautioned. Finally, entering the video operation room will cause a player or team official to be sent off.

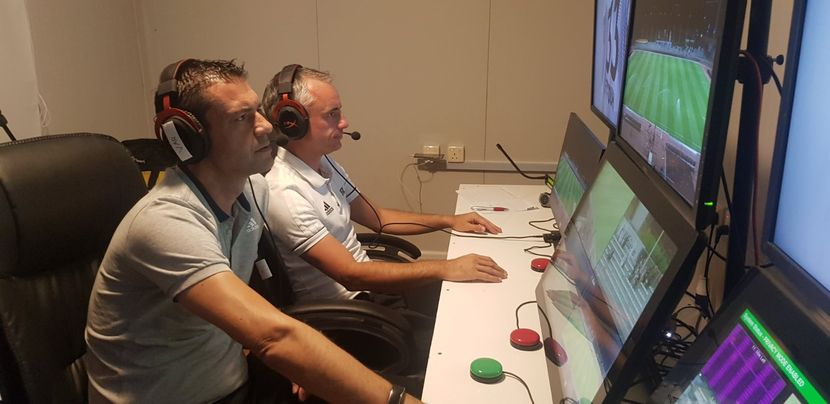
Assistant video assistant referees in action during a Saudi Professional League match

=== Location ===
The VAR and the AVARs are often located within the stadium where the match is being played. Certain leagues have begun using a centralized review location. For example, the English Premier League stations all its VAR teams in the video operation room (VOR) at Stockley Park in London and the German Football Association in Cologne-Deutz. During its 2022 season, Major League Soccer in the United States created a Video Review Center in Atlanta where all its VAR teams operate.

=== Camera setup ===
The VAR system consists of 42 cameras including slow and ultra slow motion cameras as well as the cameras used in offside technology, and all FIFA host broadcaster camera feeds to ensure the VAR has the best angle possible on every play.

== Glossary ==
A number of technical terms and abbreviations are used in reference to the VAR system. These include:

- Check – Process by which the VAR automatically inspects all reviewable decisions. A check can result in confirmation of the on-field decision (a "silent check"), a change in decision for factual matters (e.g. offside/not offside) or the recommendation of an OFR.
- Clear and obvious error – Degree required for an on-field decision to be overturned.
- OFR – On-field review; review process that occurs following recommendation by the VAR. Used where a clear and obvious mistake may have been made in regards to a subjective decision.
- RO – Replay operator; non-referee official who assists video officials by managing the broadcast and finding the best angles to allow for the right decision to be made
- RRA – Referee review area; area where an OFR is conducted, located adjacent to the field of play and in sight at all times
- VAR – Video Assistant Referee; main video official whose main role is to check all reviewable incidents and recommend an OFR where a possible clear and obvious error has occurred. The VAR is a current or former qualified referee.
  - AVAR – Assistant VAR; official that assists the VAR by watching the live action on the field while the VAR is undertaking a "check" or a "review".
    - Offside VAR – AVAR official that anticipates and checks any potential offside situations in game-changing situations.
    - Support VAR – AVAR official that coordinates communication between VAR officials and focuses on the television programme feed.
- Video official – Category of match official, alongside on-field officials. Consists of VAR and any AVARs.
- VOR – Video operation room; room where the VAR team is located. The VOR can be located in or near the stadium, or in a centralised location such as a broadcast centre.

== History ==
Before official VAR was developed, the concept of using video for refereeing decisions was arguably pioneered in Yemen. In 2006, former referee Ahmed Qaid Saif consulted a pitchside video monitor to determine the legitimacy of a disputed goal in a match between Al-Tilal and Al-Saqr in Aden. Although this broke conventional rules at the time, it was welcomed by players and the Yemeni FA and stands as one of the earliest known instances of a referee utilizing video tech to make a correct call in a competitive match.

After the previous incident in Yemen, the formalized VAR system was officially developed, used and tested under the International Football Association Board (IFAB)—the body that determines the Laws of the Game—as part of their "Minimise interference, maximise benefit" philosophy. The system was first used in an official match on September 21, 2016, in a Dutch cup match between Ajax and Willem II. It made its debut on the global stage at the 2018 FIFA World Cup in Russia. The video technology that powers the VAR setup today is largely supplied and patented by companies like Hawk-Eye Innovations (owned by Sony), which operates under licensing agreements with FIFA.

The moment when the referee decides to take a penalty kick as a result of VAR evaluation in the TFF First League.

VAR was conceived by the Refereeing 2.0 project in the early 2010s and under the direction of the Royal Netherlands Football Association (KNVB). The system was tested through mock trials during the 2012–13 season of the Eredivisie, the country's top football league. In 2014, the KNVB petitioned the International Football Association Board (IFAB) to amend its laws of the games to allow the system to be used during more extensive trials. The IFAB approved trials and a pathway to full implementation during its 2016 general meeting. Lukas Brud, IFAB secretary, said "With all the 4G and Wi-Fi in stadia today...we knew we had to protect referees from making mistakes that everyone can see immediately", such as Thierry Henry's handball that eliminated Ireland from qualifying for the 2010 FIFA World Cup where the on-field referees were not in a position to view the infraction.

Proposals to introduce any form of video review were consistently rejected by FIFA president Sepp Blatter. Throughout his presidency, Blatter was vehemently opposed to the introduction of any new technology to challenge the live decisions of referees in football, often even going to far as to intervene (or threaten to) in domestic competition matters where the only pertinent question was whether suspensions for questionable sendings off should be enforced. After Blatter was forced out of his post due to an unrelated corruption scandal in 2015, the VAR proposal received a warm reception under his successor Gianni Infantino.

The first live trial of the VAR system was in July 2016 in a friendly match between PSV and FC Eindhoven.

The next live trial of the VAR system began in August 2016 with a United Soccer League match between two Major League Soccer reserve sides. Match referee Ismail Elfath reviewed two fouls during the match and, after consultation with video assistant referee Allen Chapman, decided to issue a red card and a yellow card in the respective incidents.

Video reviews were introduced the following month during an international friendly between France and Italy.

The first professional "non-friendly" game was an official first round KNVB Cup tie between Ajax and Willem II on 21 September 2016. This match was the first match to include a "pitchside monitor". The pitchside monitor would allow the referee to review footage from the field. Based on VAR but not using the available pitchside monitor, a yellow card was turned into a red card and thus this was the first ever VAR based expulsion in a professional game. Interestingly, this professional and official Cup game was played before the official FIFA rule changes. Although viewers watching the match on television were made aware of the decision, the public in the stadium and, to a lesser extent, the players were confused as to what had happened. The major lesson from the confusion around this first major decision change was that VAR decisions needed to be clearly communicated to the players, the watching public inside the stadium, and on TV.

The next event that VAR was used, including a "pitchside monitor" was at the 2016 FIFA Club World Cup. Kashima Antlers were awarded a penalty after a video review in the 3–0 win of semi-final against Atlético Nacional.

The A-League in Australia became the first to use a VAR system in a top-flight professional club competition on 7 April 2017, when Melbourne City played Adelaide United though this game was completed without the VAR being called upon. The first intervention by a VAR in a professional national league game was seen on 8 April when Wellington Phoenix hosted Sydney FC. The VAR identified an illegal handball in the penalty area and awarded Sydney FC a penalty. The game finished in a 1–1 draw.

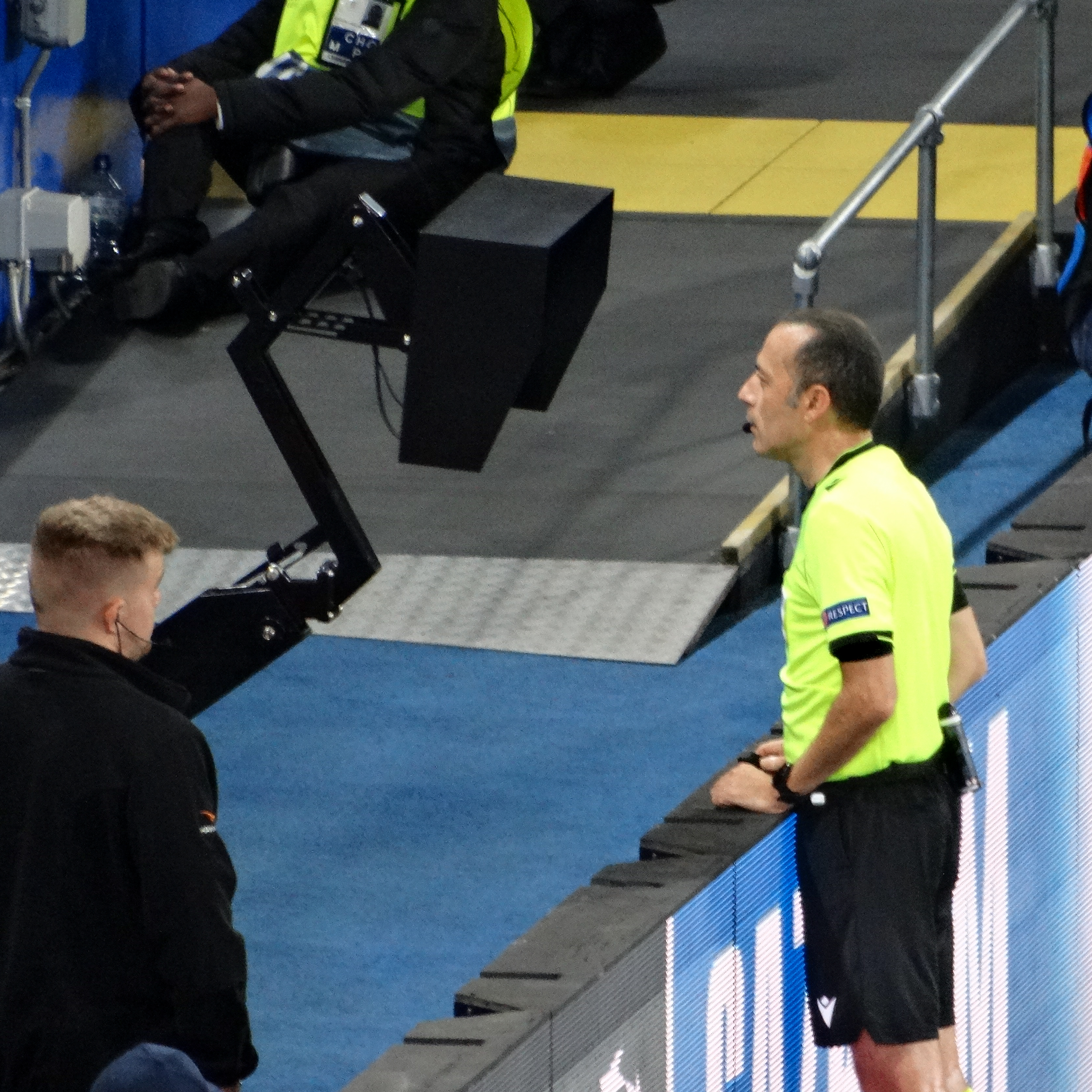
VAR in use in the UEFA Champions League group stage in 2019 by Cüneyt Çakır

Major League Soccer in the United States introduced VAR in competitive matches during its 2017 season after the 2017 MLS All-Star Game on 2 August 2017. Its first official use came during a match between the Philadelphia Union and FC Dallas, invalidating a goal from the latter over contact made between a Dallas player and Philadelphia's goalkeeper. VAR was used at an international level in the 2017 FIFA Confederations Cup in June, where it was praised, but its usefulness was questioned after a referee decision in the final match.

Also in 2017, Portuguese Football Federation (FPF) had its first official match using VAR, during Portuguese Cup Final between SL Benfica and Vitoria SC at Jamor Stadium on the 28 May 2017. Portuguese Football Federation was the first country in the world to use VAR in a Women's competition: one week after men's Cup final, in the same stadium, VAR was officially used in a Women's match between Sporting CP and SC Braga.

After the 2016 introduction in cup football in Europe, the VAR system was introduced in top-flight European football league competitions by Bundesliga and the Serie A at the beginning of the 2017–18 season and by La Liga at the beginning of the 2018–19 season. The system was also used at the 2017 FIFA U-20 World Cup in October. On 8 January 2018, VAR was trialled for the first time in England in the 2017–18 FA Cup game between Brighton & Hove Albion and Crystal Palace, and the following day it was trialled for the first time in France in the Côte d'Azur derby game in the 2017–18 French League Cup. It was said to have worked well.

Italy opened the world's first VAR training centre in Coverciano in January 2018.

The VAR system that is currently used was created by Hawk-Eye Innovations Limited and was tested according to FIFA's Quality Programme by a third party

On 3 March 2018, the IFAB wrote VAR into the Laws of the Game on a permanent basis. Its use remained optional for competitions, and the English Premier League and the UEFA Champions League were not expected to implement VAR for their 2018–19 season. However Premier League executive chairman Richard Scudamore described it as "inevitable" that VAR will be introduced to the Premier League. On 27 September 2018, UEFA announced that from the 2019–20 UEFA Champions League season, VAR will be used in the competition. Although VAR was not implemented in the group stages of the 2018–19 season, UEFA announced on 3 December 2018, that VAR would be used in the knockout stages, which commenced in February 2019.

On 15 November 2018, Premier League teams voted in principle to bring Video Assistant Referees to the Premier League from the 2019–20 season onwards pending approval of IFAB and FIFA; this came after a controversial decision from referee Simon Hooper to disallow a goal scored by Southampton F.C. striker Charlie Austin.

On 1 January 2020, the Emperor's Cup Final was the first Japanese football match to use VAR. This was also a preparation for the introduction of VAR into Olympic football.

In 2023, it was announced that the 2023 FIFA Women's World Cup for the first time the decision will be explained live in the stadium by the referee. This was also later used in the 2024 A-League finals series and also used in the MLS. Likewise, the Premier League introduced in-stadium announcements from the beginning of the 2025-26 season.

== Notable uses of VAR ==
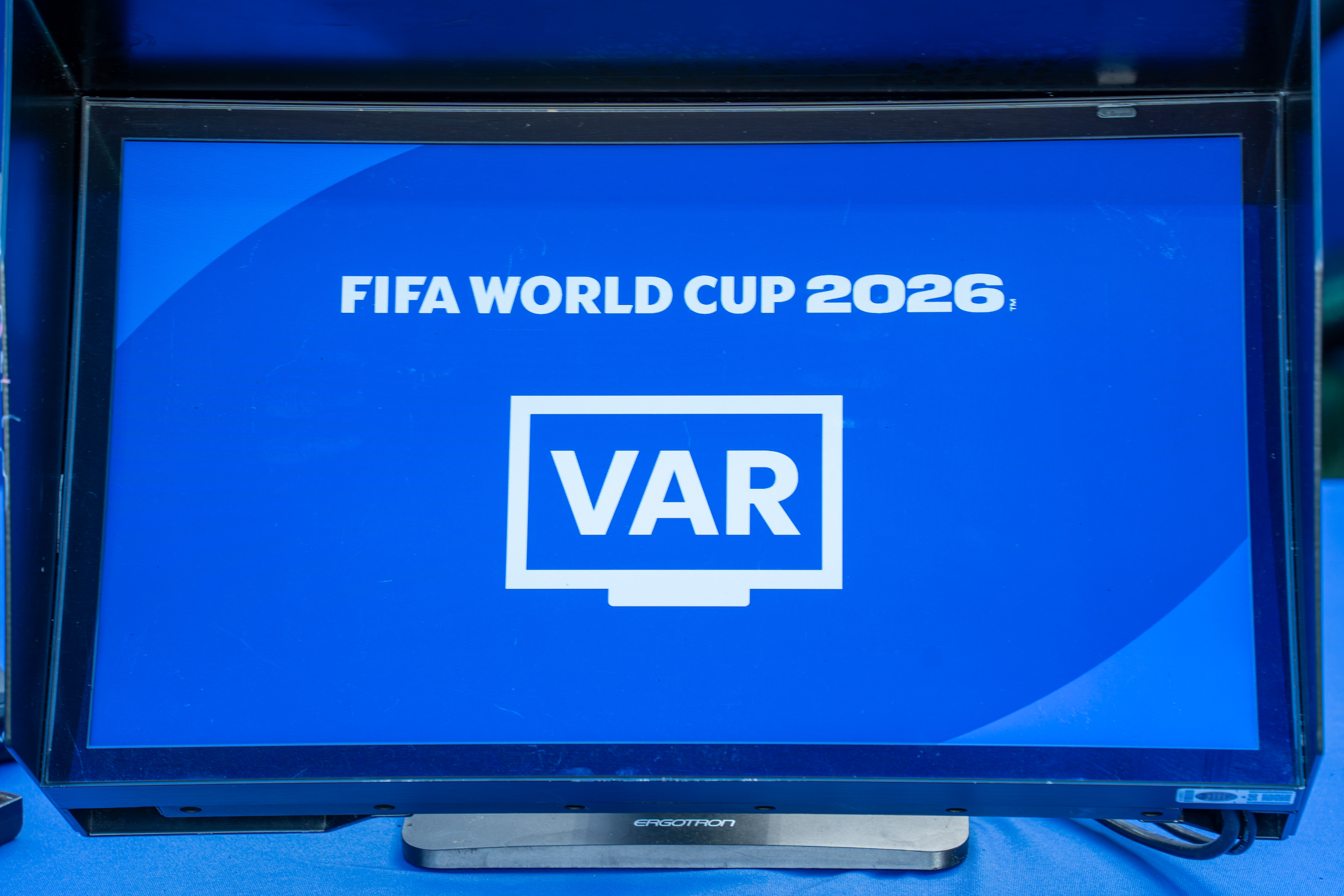
VAR monitor at the 2026 FIFA World Cup

=== 2018 FIFA World Cup ===
FIFA officially approved the use of VAR for the 2018 FIFA World Cup during the FIFA Council meeting on 16 March 2018 in Bogotá. This tournament became the first competition to use VAR in full (at all matches and in all venues).

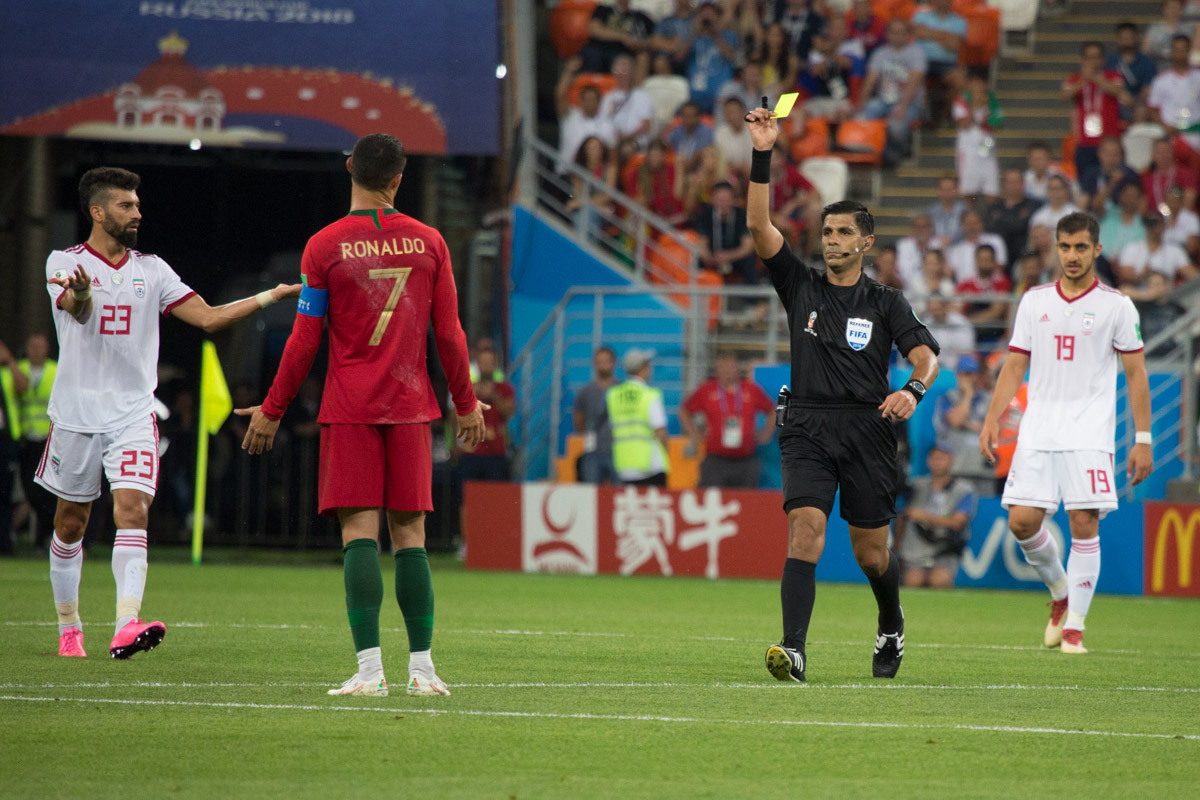
Cristiano Ronaldo of Portugal being shown a yellow card after a challenge with an Iranian player that was reviewed by referee Enrique Cáceres as a potential red card incident

The 2018 World Cup marked the system's World Cup debut. A total of 335 incidents were checked by the VAR over the course of the group stage, averaging seven per match, and fourteen calls made by referees were changed or overruled after being reviewed by the VAR. According to FIFA, the VAR system had a success rate of 99.3 percent, up from the 95 percent of correct calls by referees without VAR. The first VAR decision at the World Cup came on 16 June 2018 in a group stage match between France and Australia, where referee Andres Cunha awarded a penalty to France after consulting with the VAR. In the final, referee Néstor Pitana used the VAR to review a defensive foul for handling in the penalty area, awarding France a penalty, which gave them a 2–1 lead over Croatia. The final eventually ended with France prevailing 4–2.

The use of VAR has been credited with assisting the 2018 edition's status as the cleanest World Cup since 1986, after no red cards were issued in the opening 11 games and only four players were sent off in the entire tournament which was the fewest since 1978. 22 goals were scored from 29 awarded penalty kicks, beating the previous record of 17 penalty kick goals set in the 1998 tournament; the dramatic increase in the number of penalties awarded at the 2018 World Cup has been attributed to VAR catching fouls which would otherwise have remained unpunished. IFAB technical director and former Premier League referee David Elleray stated a belief that the presence of VAR meant that players would know that they would not be able to get away with anything under the new system.

=== 2026 FIFA World Cup ===
In his team's 2–0 victory against Bosnia & Herzegovina in the round of 32, U.S. national team forward Folarin Balogun received a red card following video review of a challenge in which he stepped on Bosnian center back Tarik Muharemović's ankle, despite play being allowed to continue in the moment. As a result, he was suspended and would have had to sit out the team's following round of 16 game against Belgium. On 5 July, FIFA announced it had overturned the suspension.

As in 2018, Croatia faced a controversial VAR decision. In the 103rd minute of their round of 32 contest against Portugal, Croatia's Josko Gvardiol scored an equalizer that was ruled offside after the newly-introduced snickometer system reported contact as the ball traveled near the head of his teammate Igor Matanovic before Gvardiol's goal. With the goal reversed, Portugal won the match 2-1 amid Croatia fans in attendance throwing garbage and yelling expletives at the officiating crew in protest. After the match, Matanovic stated that he thought he "felt a slight contact with [his] hair" and Croatia head coach Zlatko Dalić criticized the decision as "very bad refereeing" and "[taking] the joy out of football." FIFA responded to the controversy by stating that the "IMU sensors housed within the Trionda ball are capable of determining any slight contact" and that the referee's decision was correct.

In the quarterfinal match between Argentina and Switzerland, Argentine midfielder Leandro Paredes received a yellow card for a tackle against Swiss forward Breel Embolo. Under the new "mistaken identity" rule introduced for the tournament to allow decisions made against the wrong party to be overturned, VAR review determined that Embolo's fall was simulated and began before Paredes made contact with him. As a result, the yellow card given to Paredes was rescinded. Embolo, who had already received a yellow card earlier in the match, was ejected from the game after receiving his second yellow card for the simulation. Swiss coach Murat Yakin described the decision as "completely not understandable," and said that the Swiss team had played against "the referee and VAR" in addition to Argentina. On 28 July, the IFAB said that the red card had been given in error, as the Laws of the Game only permitted a mistaken identity review to transfer the penalty to another player, not to rescind the penalty entirely as it was in Paredes' case. A FIFA spokesperson responded that "FIFA's interpretation of Mistaken Identity was consistently applied during the FIFA World Cup," citing a second instance of a similar ruling in a United States v. Paraguay group-stage match. Additionally, they stated it was not a refereeing error, as Embolo's fall being simulated "cannot be disputed" and should not have resulted in Paredes being penalized, and that the decision was "well received" and would be considered in future updates to the VAR rules. The IFAB agreed that the decision was well received and confirmed that VAR review for simulation would be considered in the future, but clarified to referees that it "may not be used as such until that review is concluded."

== Issues and criticism ==
The use of video technology at the 2017 FIFA Confederations Cup was criticised by Lee Dixon and FIFA's head of refereeing Massimo Busacca after several contentious moments involving VAR at the tournament. It was accused of "creating as much confusion as clarity".

In some instances, VAR has suffered technical difficulties preventing its use. In a 2018 Primeira Liga match between Boavista F.C. and AVS Futebol SAD, a Boavista flag in the stands obscured a VAR camera that would have provided review for an offside call. In the 2018 A-League Grand Final between Newcastle Jets and Melbourne Victory, the VAR software suffered a technical malfunction which prevented the assistant referee from viewing the replay, allowing Melbourne Victory a wrongly awarded goal that won them the A-League Championship.

After the introduction of VAR in the 2018 World Cup, FIFA deemed it a success. Nevertheless, the use (or lack of use) of VAR has been criticised. Independent assessments note that while most decisions were made correctly as a result of VAR, some were wrong despite VAR review and some decisions which were called incorrectly were not even reviewed. There have also been incidents when there has been miscommunication between VAR and the referee, such as Liverpool FC v Tottenham FC in September 2023 which ended up being a crucial mistake after VAR told the referee the wrong decision after they thought the on-field decision was the other way about. The Guardian concludes that VAR has been most effective for factual decisions such as offsides and mistaken identities, while subjective decisions such as penalties or the disciplining of players have fared much worse. Lack of clarity and consistency are two main areas of weakness. This discrepancy has driven broader analytical efforts to evaluate how card-based disciplinary enforcement and refereeing standards are reviewed under video assistance systems. In addition, research from the University of Bath found that, on average, "participants thought the ball was kicked 132 miliseconds later than it actually was", proving that the technology at present has issues with accuracy.

Another line of criticism has been targeted at the effectiveness of the system in achieving its goal. In the opinion of Scott Stinson from the National Post, VAR, like any other replay system, fails to correct human error and instead only adds to the controversies because human judgment is still necessary. Human error has significant social causes as well, as a research study done in Italy found that players with darker skin complexion were "more likely to receive punishment for fouls" with all else held constant. Such bias, including unconscious bias, may not be removed entirely by VAR, as it still relies on human judgment to make the final call. Concerns also arise even with VAR's accuracy. In the 2018–19 Champions League quarterfinals, VAR ruled out a last-minute Manchester City goal against Tottenham due to Agüero's marginal offside. While technically correct, it highlighted issues with delayed flagging and ultra-tight decisions, leaving City’s fans devastated.

Lack of transparency is another contentious point, as teams have no way to know which incidents were reviewed by the VAR team. At a press conference held after the group stage, FIFA referees committee chairman Pierluigi Collina showed footage of the decision-making process accompanied with audio of the conversations between VAR officials and the referees. Asked if this audio could be made publicly available, as it is in rugby and cricket, Collina answered affirmatively but cautioned that it might still be too early. That said, in an attempt to provide more transparency to fans, sports broadcaster Sky Sports launched the controversial television programme "Match Officials Mic'd Up". Produced by the Premier League, the show aims to bring transparency and constructive discourse to the VAR process, with host Michael Owen and PGMOL Chief Howard Webb analysing VAR calls from previous game weeks.

Others have pointed to the game-changing nature of VAR. There is an increase in the number and duration of pause in the game with VAR system. Initial fears that using the system would lengthen the game considerably have not been confirmed, with every VAR review taking up an average of only 80 seconds. The dramatic increase in the number of penalties awarded at the 2018 World Cup has been attributed to VAR catching fouls which would otherwise have remained unpunished. Of the 169 goals scored in the tournament, 22 were from penalty kicks (with 29 being awarded in total), beating the previous record of 17 set in the 1998 FIFA World Cup. Jonathan Liew of The Independent compares the situation to the introduction of the Decision Review System in cricket and notes the changes it had on that sport, and suggests that it might lead to changes of a similar nature in football.

In a 2025/2026 Scottish Premiership game involving Motherwell and Celtic, Celtic were awarded a controversial last minute penalty by VAR, after Motherwell player Sam Nicolson was penalised for handball even though the ball hit his shoulder. The penalty was converted by Alex-Oxlade Chamberlain enabling them to keep the pressure on title rivals Hearts, Celtic would win the title by 2 points after a 3-1 win over Hearts in the last game of the season. Hearts manager at the time, Derek McInnes, branded the decision to award the penalty at Motherwell as "disgusting" and Gary Linekar branded it "the worst VAR decision ever".

VAR has not just affected the teams that are playing the game. English Premier league fans said that VAR has made the game less enjoyable since the introduction of it and will attend fewer games because of this. The increase in pauses during a game has also been a huge factor with the football fans, with a great number of fans saying that they would most likely support VAR if there was a time limit for the amount of time VAR takes when in use.

Use of VAR has actually been shown to increase playing time in both the first and second half, while not significantly altering the amount of other variable, such as penalties, offsides, fouls, and goals except for a considerable decrease in the number of offsides in Men's football matches, which could be contributed to video analysis being more reliable than human judgement in these scenarios.

In February 2019, UEFA issued guidance which stated that players who made a "TV-screen" hand gesture should result in a yellow card. "Excessively using the 'review' (TV screen) signal" is now listed as a caution for which a player may receive a yellow card in the Laws of the Game. Early uses of VAR in the Premier League, at the beginning of the 2019–20 season, were described as confusing to both coaches and fans with the decision making often inconsistent. By 2022 the application of VAR in the Premier League was still subject to criticism. On 3 September 2022, games involving Chelsea, West Ham United, Newcastle United, Crystal Palace, Brentford and Leeds United all contained contentious VAR decisions.

Premier League officials were criticized for taking lucrative jobs in the Middle East. In the match between Tottenham Hotspur and Liverpool on 30 September 2023, the VAR Darren England made a decision that led to the disallowance of a valid goal scored by Luis Diaz. England was alleged of losing focus because he had taken an eight-hour flight back from the United Arab Emirates along with Dan Cook, the assistant VAR. The situation further complicated when it was revealed that England and Cook had been in the UAE to supervise a Pro League game. They reportedly received a payment of £15–20k for this duty.

In VAR matches the assistant referees who decide on offsides are required to avoid raising the flag for an offside decision until the play proceeds to a natural conclusion, unless the offside is extremely obvious. This allows a team who might have been called for an offside offence to instead continue and score a goal to be checked by VAR. When play continues there is the chance of an injury occurring that might not before the introduction of VAR. Team-mates Rui Patricio and Conor Coady collided with each other in a game against Liverpool after a delayed offside call allowed play to continue and Fernando Muslera suffered a double leg break after a collision with opposition striker Milan Škoda following a delayed offside call in December 2021.

The Premier League introduced semi-automated offside technology on 12 April 2025. This technology removes the human error aspect of detecting when the ball has been kicked and placing the lines onto players and to pitch level, making it quicker and more accurate.

== See also ==
- List of association football competitions using VAR
- Football video support
- Goal-line technology
- Instant replay – describes other sports using video referees
- Semi-automated offside technology
- VAR in chess
