= 2019 Blue Stars/FIFA Youth Cup =

Tournament details
- Host country: Switzerland
- Dates: 30 – 31 May 2019
- Teams: Men:10; Women:6
- Venue: Zürich

Final positions
- Champions: Men: (Argentina) Boca Juniors (3rd title); Women: (Germany) VfL Wolfsburg (1st title)
- Runners-up: Men: (Portugal) Benfica; Women: (Switzerland) BSC YB Frauen

Tournament statistics
- Matches played: 36
- Goals scored: 81 (2.25 per match)
- Attendance: 14,000 (389 per match)
- Best player(s): Men: (Argentina) Lucas Brochero (Boca Juniors); Women: (Germany) Maria Christina Lange (VfL Wolfsburg)
- Best goalkeeper: Men: (Argentina) Matías Ramos Mingo (Boca Juniors); Women: (Switzerland) Saskia Bürki (Young Boys)
- Fair play award: Men: (Greece) PAOK; Women: (Canada) Vancouver Whitecaps

The 2019 Blue Stars/FIFA Youth Cup was the 81st edition of the Blue Stars/FIFA Youth Cup, an association football tournament organized by FIFA for clubs featuring players under the age of 21. It was held on Ascension Thursday, 30 May 2019 and 31 May 2019.

This year's women's tournament was the second edition after the 2018 edition which Young Boys women team won.

All matches were played in two 20-minute halves (except for the final which was 25 minutes), only players between 18 and 20 years were eligible to participate. However, each team may have up to five players under the age of 18 feature. All matches were played at the Buchlern sports stadium in Zürich.

== Men's tournament ==
Participating teams

- (Switzerland) FC Blue Stars Zürich
- (Switzerland) FC Basel
- (Portugal) SL Benfica
- (Argentina) Boca Juniors
- (Croatia) Dinamo Zagreb
- (Switzerland) FC Zürich
- (Switzerland) GC Zürich
- (Greece) PAOK
- (United States) Seattle Sounders
- (Spain) Sevilla

=== Group stage ===
==== Group A ====
Pos	Team	Pld	W	D	L	GF	GA	GD	Pts	Qualification
1	(Argentina) Boca Juniors (Q)	4	3	1	0	10	1	+9	10	Qualification to the Final
2	(Croatia) Dinamo Zagreb	4	3	1	0	7	0	+7	10	
3	(Switzerland) GC Zürich	4	2	0	2	9	5	+4	6	
4	(Spain) Sevilla	4	0	1	3	0	7	−7	1	
5	(Switzerland) FC Blue Stars Zürich	4	0	1	3	0	13	−13	1	

Source: FIFA
Rules for classification: 1) points; 2) goal difference; 3) number of goals scored
(Q) Qualified for the phase indicated

Times in UTC+, Switzerland local time.

30 May 2019	Dinamo Zagreb	2–0	FC Blue Stars Zürich
10:50	Kapitanović 12', 27'

30 May 2019	Boca Juniors	2–0	Sevilla
10:50	Fernandez 8'; Brochero 13'

30 May 2019	Sevilla	0–0	FC Blue Stars Zürich
13:30

30 May 2019	GC Zürich	0–2	Dinamo Zagreb
13:30			Kim 8'; Kapitanović 29'

30 May 2019	Boca Juniors	3–1	GC Zürich
16:00	Brochero 13'; Gerzel 27'; Bodencer 40'		Aliu 11'

30 May 2019	Sevilla	0–3	Dinamo Zagreb
16:00			Kapitanović 13', 35'; Dejanović 24'

30 May 2019	FC Blue Stars Zürich	0–5	Boca Juniors
18:55			Bodencer 11', 32', 37'; Roldán 31'

31 May 2019	GC Zürich	2–0	Sevilla
11:15	Rustemoski 13'; Bajrami 40'

31 May 2019	Dinamo Zagreb	0–0	Boca Juniors
13:00

31 May 2019	FC Blue Stars Zürich	0–6	GC Zürich
13:00			Rustemoski 8', 27'; Fehr 15', 18', 22'; Nwenyi 39'

==== Group B ====
Pos	Team	Pld	W	D	L	GF	GA	GD	Pts	Qualification
1	(Portugal) Benfica (Q)	4	3	0	1	3	1	+2	9	Qualification to the Final
2	(Greece) PAOK	4	2	2	0	4	2	+2	8	
3	(Switzerland) FC Zürich	4	1	2	1	5	3	+2	5	
4	(Switzerland) FC Basel	4	1	1	2	2	3	−1	4	
5	(United States) Seattle Sounders FC	4	0	1	3	1	6	−5	1	

Source: FIFA
Rules for classification: 1) points; 2) goal difference; 3) number of goals scored
(Q) Qualified for the phase indicated

Times in UTC+, Switzerland local time.

30 May 2019	Benfica	1–0	FC Zürich
11:40	Semedo 27'

30 May 2019	Seattle Sounders	1–1	PAOK
11:40	Malone 27'		Tzovaras 9'

30 May 2019	PAOK	1–1	FC Zürich
14:20	Doumtsis 11'		Ndau 19'

30 May 2019	FC Basel	0–1	Benfica
14:20			Pinto 36'

30 May 2019	Seattle Sounders	0–1	FC Basel
16:50			Marchand 38'

30 May 2019	PAOK	1–0	Benfica
16:50	Gaitanidis 11'

30 May 2019	FC Zürich	3–0	Seattle Sounders
18:55	Kamberi 15'; Stevic 18'; Nascimento Satorno 28'

31 May 2019	FC Basel	0–1	PAOK
11:15			Michailidis 39'

31 May 2019	Benfica	1–0	Seattle Sounders
13:50	Semedo 18'

31 May 2019	FC Zürich	1–1	FC Basel
13:50	Nascimento Satorno 10'		Vonmoos 16'

=== Final stage ===
Times in UTC+1, Switzerland local time.

Ninth place game

31 May 2019	FC Blue Stars Zürich	0–2	Seattle Sounders
15:40			Serrano Lopez 7', 19'

Seventh place game

31 May 2019	Sevilla	1–1 (7–6 p)	FC Basel
15:40	Peral Gallardo 28'		Martinovic 38'

Fifth place game

31 May 2019	GC Zürich	0–1	FC Zürich
16:40			Nascimento Satorno 5'

Third place game

31 May 2019	Dinamo Zagreb	0–0 (3–4 p)	PAOK
17:40

==== Final ====
31 May 2019	Boca Juniors	2–0	Benfica
20:10	Brochero 16', 51'

2019 FIFA Youth Cup winners

3rd title

=== Final standings ===
Pos.	Team	G	Pld	W	D	L	Pts	GF	GA	GD
1st place, gold medalist(s)	(Argentina) Boca Juniors	A	5	4	1	0	13	12	1	+11
2nd place, silver medalist(s)	(Portugal) Benfica	B	5	3	0	2	9	3	3	0
3rd place, bronze medalist(s)	(Greece) PAOK	B	5	2	3	0	9	4	2	+2
4	(Croatia) Dinamo Zagreb	A	5	3	2	0	11	7	0	+7
5	(Switzerland) FC Zürich	B	5	2	2	1	8	6	3	+3
6	(Switzerland) GC Zürich	A	5	2	0	3	6	9	6	+3
7	(Spain) Sevilla	A	5	0	2	3	2	1	8	−7
8	(Switzerland) FC Basel	B	5	1	2	2	5	3	4	−1
9	(United States) Seattle Sounders	B	5	1	1	3	4	3	6	−3
10	(Switzerland) FC Blue Stars Zürich	A	5	0	1	4	1	0	15	−15

== Women's tournament ==
Participating teams

- (Switzerland) FC Blue Stars Zürich
- (Italy) Internazionale
- (Canada) Vancouver Whitecaps
- (Germany) Wolfsburg
- (Switzerland) BSC YB Frauen
- (Switzerland) FC Zürich Frauen

=== Group stage ===
==== Group A ====
Pos	Team	Pld	W	D	L	GF	GA	GD	Pts	Qualification
1	(Germany) VfL Wolfsburg (Q)	2	2	0	0	13	1	+12	6	Qualification to the Semi-finals
2	(Canada) Vancouver Whitecaps (Q)	2	1	0	1	2	5	−3	3	Qualification to the Semi-finals
3	(Switzerland) FC Blue Stars Zürich	2	0	0	2	0	9	−9	0	

Source: FIFA
Rules for classification: 1) points; 2) goal difference; 3) number of goals scored
(Q) Qualified for the phase indicated

Times in UTC+, Switzerland local time.

30 May 2019	VfL Wolfsburg	8–0	FC Blue Stars Zürich
10:00	Jubel 5'; Lange 7', 15', 16'; Fischer 19'; Memeti 21'; Bartel 24'; Dönges 40'

30 May 2019	FC Blue Stars Zürich	0–1	Vancouver Whitecaps
12:40			Ganief 17'

30 May 2019	Vancouver Whitecaps	1–5	VfL Wolfsburg
15:10	Akindoju 28'		Cordes 4'; Baaß 12'; Schumacher 12'; Fischer 26', 40'

==== Group B ====
Pos	Team	Pld	W	D	L	GF	GA	GD	Pts	Qualification
1	(Switzerland) BSC YB Frauen (Q)	2	1	0	1	2	1	+1	3	Qualification to the Semi-finals
2	(Italy) Internazionale (Q)	2	1	0	1	1	1	0	3	Qualification to the Semi-finals
3	(Switzerland) FC Zürich Frauen	2	1	0	1	1	2	−1	3	

Source: FIFA
Rules for classification: 1) points; 2) goal difference; 3) number of goals scored
(Q) Qualified for the phase indicated

Times in UTC+1, Switzerland local time.

30 May 2019	Internazionale	0–1	FC Zürich Frauen
10:00			Graf 6'

30 May 2019	FC Zürich Frauen	0–2	BSC YB Frauen
12:40			Djeaid 8'; Schassberger 13'

30 May 2019	BSC YB Frauen	0–1	Internazionale
15:10			Coghetto 25'

=== Final stage ===
Times in UTC+1, Switzerland local time.

==== Semi-finals ====
30 May 2019	VfL Wolfsburg	5–0	Internazionale
18:05	Räcke 3'; Lange 5', 7'; Memeti 12'; Schumacher 39'

30 May 2019	Vancouver Whitecaps	0–1	BSC YB Frauen
18:05	Suter 25'

==== Play-off stage ====
Fifth place game

31 May 2019	FC Blue Stars Zürich	0–3	FC Zürich Frauen
12:05			Piubel 10'; Lempérière 20'; Casagrande 39'

Third place game

31 May 2019	Internazionale	0–1	Vancouver Whitecaps
14:40	Remington 4'

==== Final ====
31 May 2019	VfL Wolfsburg	4–0	BSC YB Frauen
18:50	Fischer 4'; Baaß 14', 24'; Lange 20'

2019 FIFA Youth Cup winners

1st title

=== Final standings ===
Pos.	Team	G	Pld	W	D	L	Pts	GF	GA	GD
1st place, gold medalist(s)	(Germany) VfL Wolfsburg	A	5	5	0	0	15	22	1	+21
2nd place, silver medalist(s)	(Switzerland) BSC YB Frauen	B	4	2	0	2	6	3	6	−3
3rd place, bronze medalist(s)	(Canada) Vancouver Whitecaps	A	4	2	0	2	6	3	6	−3
4	(Italy) Internazionale	B	4	1	0	3	3	1	7	−6
5	(Switzerland) FC Zürich Frauen	B	3	2	0	1	6	4	2	+2
6	(Switzerland) FC Blue Stars Zürich	A	3	0	0	3	0	0	12	−12
