= Football video support =

Sports officiating technology

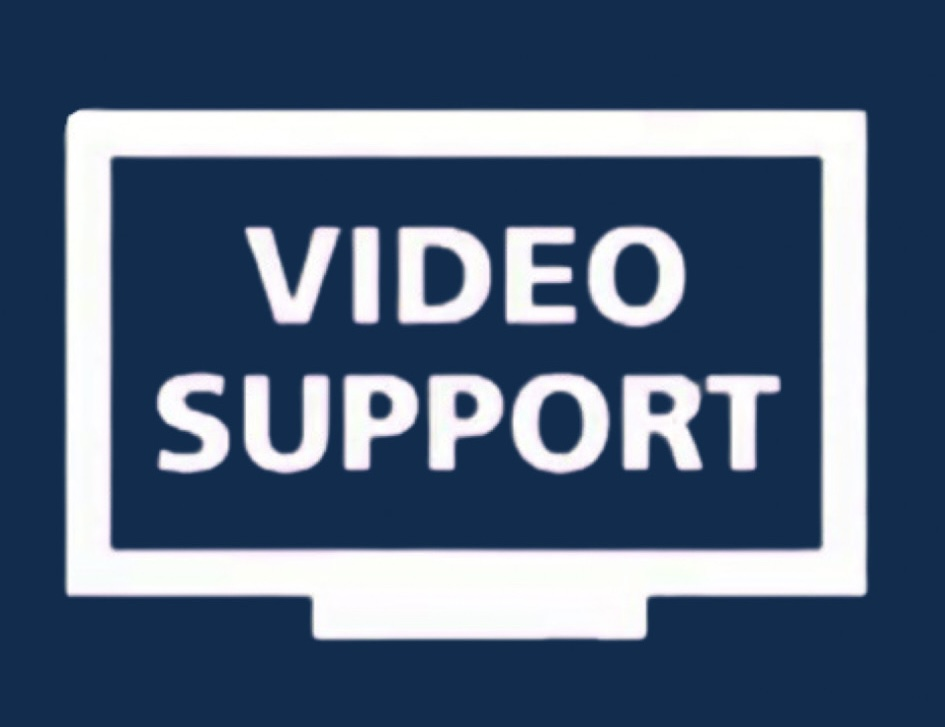
Video Support logo

The football video support (FVS), also simply video support (VS) is a system in football designed to help referees correct decisions by reviewing specific incidents upon a coach's request, rather than continuous monitoring by a video assistant referee (VAR). This system was first officially used at the 2021 FIFA Futsal World Cup in Lithuania. While less comprehensive, FVS is cheaper to implement than VAR.

== Procedure ==
There are four categories of decisions that can be reviewed.

- Goal/no goal – attacking team commits an offence, ball out of play, ball entering goal, offside, handball, offences and encroachment during penalty kicks.
- Penalty/no penalty – attacking team commits an offence, ball out of play, location of offence, incorrect awarding, offence not penalised.
- Direct red card – denial of obvious goal-scoring opportunity, serious foul play, violent conduct/biting/spitting, using offensive/insulting/abusive language or gestures.
- Mistaken identity in awarding a red or yellow card.

=== Check ===
The FVS procedure involves several steps:

1. Challenge Request: Unlike VAR, where decisions are automatically reviewed by a Video Assistant Referee, FVS is only initiated when a coach challenges a decision by presenting a review request card. Coaches are allowed two challenges for the regulation time, with an additional challenge in extra time.
2. Review Process: The referee watches the incident on a pitch-side monitor, utilizing various camera angles and speeds to determine whether the initial decision was correct.
3. Final Decision: The referee makes the final decision based on the video evidence. If the challenge is successful, the team retains the right to challenge again; if unsuccessful, the coach loses the ability to challenge for the remainder of that half or extra time.

== History ==
After Video Support was tested in the Spanish Futsal League, it made its debut in a FIFA tournament at the 2021 Futsal World Cup. Following its successful implementation in futsal, the system was renamed Football Video Support and tested in various FIFA association football tournaments. National federations soon expressed interest in adopting the technology for their own competitions.

=== Futsal ===
Football video support was first introduced in futsal at the 2021 FIFA Futsal World Cup in Lithuania. A notable instance of its use was during the final match between Portugal and Argentina, where the Argentine player Cristian Borruto was sent off following a successful challenge by the Portuguese team. Previously, FVS had already been tested in the Primera División de Futsal and other futsal competitions organized by the Royal Spanish Football Federation. FVS was used again during the 2024 FIFA Futsal World Cup.

=== Association football ===
After the successful implementation in futsal, FIFA also used the new system at the Blue Stars/FIFA Youth Cup in 2024 and then announced the implementation for the 2024 FIFA U-20 Women's World Cup. In October 2024, FIGC President Gabriele Gravina informed IFAB that they wanted to test FVS in Italy's Serie C. Knut Kircher, the sporting director of DFB Schiri GmbH, also expressed that they were open to introducing it in the German leagues. The system was used in the 2025–26 season of Liga F,, in the 2026 season of the Canadian Premier League, and in the semi-finals and final of 2026 edition of the Canadian Championship.

== Differences to VAR ==
While both FVS and VAR aim to correct clear and obvious errors, their implementation and operational procedures differ significantly:

- Initiation: VAR is automatically triggered by a video assistant referee, whereas FVS requires a coach's challenge.
- Final Decision: In both systems, the on-field referee has the final say, but in VAR, the process can include "silent checks" that do not delay the game, unlike the mandatory stop in play for a FVS challenge review.
- Location: The Replay Operator is positioned pitchside, behind the Referee Review Area (RRA), and is responsible for providing the best possible broadcast angles from that location.
