= Lucas Brochero =

Argentine footballer

Personal information
- Full name: Lucas Emanuel Brochero
- Date of birth: 23 January 1999 (age 27)
- Place of birth: La Para, Argentina
- Height: 1.72 m (5 ft 8 in)
- Position: Winger

Team information
- Current team: San Miguel (on loan from Boca Juniors)

Youth career
- Sportivo Belgrano (LP)
- 2012: Deportivo Atalaya
- 2013–2020: Boca Juniors

Senior career*
Years	Team	Apps	(Gls)
2020–	Boca Juniors	0	(0)
2020–2021	→ Central Córdoba (loan)	29	(1)
2022–2023	→ Arsenal Sarandí (loan)	60	(3)
2024	→ Barracas Central (loan)	31	(3)
2025	→ Chacarita Juniors (loan)	2	(0)
2026–	→ San Miguel (loan)	5	(0)
- * Club domestic league appearances and goals as of 18:02, 5 May 2026 (UTC)

Lucas Emanuel Brochero (born 23 January 1999) is an Argentine professional footballer who plays as a winger for San Miguel, on loan from Boca Juniors.

== Career ==
After spells with Sportivo Belgrano (LP) and Deportivo Atalaya, Brochero headed to Boca Juniors in January 2013; following a trial. For Boca, he notably won the Best Player award at the 2019 Blue Stars/FIFA Youth Cup after netting four goals; including two in the final against Benfica.

In July 2020, after signing a professional contract, Brochero was loaned to fellow Primera División team Central Córdoba until the end of 2021. He was initially an unused substitute for two matches, though soon made his senior debut in the Copa de la Liga Profesional during a win away to Defensa y Justicia on 29 November 2020. Brochero scored his first career goal with Central Córdoba on 20 March 2021 during a Copa de la Liga home draw with Estudiantes.

In January 2022, Brochero was loaned out to Arsenal de Sarandí until the end of the year.

== Personal life ==
In April 2016, Brochero starred - alongside Mario Bolatti and Juan Manuel Cavallo - in a television advert to support Bomberos Voluntarios de La Para; his hometown's local firefighters.

== Career statistics ==
As of 20 March 2021.

Appearances and goals by club, season and competition
Club	Season	League			Cup		League Cup		Continental		Other		Total	
Club	Season	Division	Apps	Goals	Apps	Goals	Apps	Goals	Apps	Goals	Apps	Goals	Apps	Goals
Boca Juniors	2020–21 (Note: Soccerway counts 2020 Copa de la Liga Profesional appearances as league appearances.)	Primera División	0	0	0	0	0	0	0	0	0	0	0	0
Boca Juniors	2021 (Note: Soccerway counts 2021 Copa de la Liga Profesional appearances as league appearances.)	Primera División	0	0	0	0	—		0	0	0	0	0	0
Boca Juniors	Total		0	0	0	0	0	0	0	0	0	0	0	0
Central Córdoba (loan)	2020–21	Primera División	4	0	0	0	0	0	—		0	0	4	0
Central Córdoba (loan)	2021	Primera División	3	1	0	0	—		—		0	0	3	1
Central Córdoba (loan)	Total		7	1	0	0	—		—		0	0	7	1
Career total			7	1	0	0	0	0	0	0	0	0	7	1

== Honours ==
Boca Juniors

- Blue Stars/FIFA Youth Cup: 2019
- Esad Osmanovski Memorial Cup: 2019

Individual

Boca Juniors

- Blue Stars/FIFA Youth Cup Best Player: 2019
