= 2023 Blue Stars/FIFA Youth Cup =

Tournament details
- Host country: Switzerland
- Dates: 17–18 May 2023
- Teams: Men: 8 Women: 8
- Venue: Zürich

Final positions
- Champions: Men: (Switzerland) Zürich (6th title); Women: (Canada) Vancouver Whitecaps (1st title)
- Runners-up: Men: (Brazil) Corinthians; Women: (Switzerland) Basel

Tournament statistics
- Matches played: 36
- Goals scored: 72 (2 per match)

The 2023 Blue Stars/FIFA Youth Cup was the 83rd edition of the Blue Stars/FIFA Youth Cup, an association football tournament organized by FIFA for clubs featuring players under the age of 21. It was held on 17 May and on Ascension Thursday, 18 May 2023. Participants were announced on 4 April 2023. The schedule was published on 13 April 2023.

FC Zurich and Vancouver Whitecaps claimed the men's and women's titles respectively at the final on 18 May.

== Participating teams ==
Eight men and women's teams are split into two groups of four each. Reigning champions FC Basel (men) and FC Zürich (women) return to defend their titles. Arsenal are participating for the first time, while Génération Foot is the first ever African team to join the tournament.

Group	Men	Women
A	(Senegal) Génération Foot	(England) Arsenal W.F.C.
A	(France) Olympique de Marseille	(Sweden) FC Rosengård
A	(Switzerland) FC Basel	(Switzerland) FC Basel Frauen
A	(Switzerland) FC Zürich	(Switzerland) FC Zürich Frauen
B	(England) Liverpool	(Canada) Vancouver Whitecaps
B	(Brazil) Corinthians Paulista	(Italy) Juventus
B	(Switzerland) FC Blue Stars	(Switzerland) BSC YB Frauen
B	(Switzerland) Grasshopper Club	(Switzerland) Grasshopper Club (women)

== Men's tournament ==
=== Group stage ===
==== Group A ====
Pos	Team	Pld	W	D	L	GF	GA	GD	Pts	Qualification	(Senegal) GFA	(Switzerland) ZUR	(Switzerland) BAS	(France) OMA
1	(Senegal) Génération Foot	3	2	0	1	3	3	0	6	Knockout stage	—		2–0	
2	(Switzerland) Zürich	3	1	2	0	5	2	+3	5	Knockout stage	3–0	—	1–1	
3	(Switzerland) Basel	3	1	1	1	3	3	0	4				—	2–0
4	(France) Marseille	3	0	1	2	1	4	−3	1		0–1	1–1		—

Source: FIFA
Rules for classification: 1) Points; 2) Goal difference; 3) Goals scored; 4) Head-to-head performance; 5) Fair play ranking; 6) Drawing of lots.
17 May 2023
15:25

Marseille (France)	1–1	(Switzerland) Zürich
	Report

17 May 2023
15:25

Génération Foot (Senegal)	2–0	(Switzerland) Basel
	Report

17 May 2023
19:00

Marseille (France)	0–1	(Senegal) Génération Foot
	Report

17 May 2023
19:00

Zürich (Switzerland)	0–0	(Switzerland) Basel
	Report

18 May 2023
11:00

Basel (Switzerland)	2–0	(France) Marseille
	Report

18 May 2023
11:00

Zürich (Switzerland)	3–0	(Senegal) Génération Foot
	Report

==== Group B ====
Pos	Team	Pld	W	D	L	GF	GA	GD	Pts	Qualification	(Switzerland) GCZ	(Brazil) COR	(England) LIV	(Switzerland) BSZ
1	(Switzerland) Grasshopper	3	1	2	0	4	1	+3	5	Knockout stage	—	0–0		3–0
2	(Brazil) Corinthians	3	1	2	0	3	0	+3	5	Knockout stage		—		3–0
3	(England) Liverpool	3	1	2	0	2	1	+1	5		1–1	0–0	—	
4	(Switzerland) Blue Stars	3	0	0	3	0	7	−7	0				0–1	—

Source: FIFA
Rules for classification: 1) Points; 2) Goal difference; 3) Goals scored; 4) Head-to-head performance; 5) Fair play ranking; 6) Drawing of lots.
17 May 2023
16:15

Liverpool (England)	1–1	(Switzerland) Grasshopper
	Report

17 May 2023
16:15

Corinthians (Brazil)	3–0	(Switzerland) Blue Stars
	Report

17 May 2023
19:50

Liverpool (England)	0–0	(Brazil) Corinthians
	Report

17 May 2023
19:50

Grasshopper (Switzerland)	3–0	(Switzerland) Blue Stars
	Report

18 May 2023
11:50

Blue Stars (Switzerland)	0–1	(England) Liverpool
	Report

18 May 2023
11:50

Grasshopper (Switzerland)	0–0	(Brazil) Corinthians
	Report

=== Placement game ===
==== Seventh place play-off ====
18 May 2023
15:00

Marseille (France)	3–0	(Switzerland) Blue Stars
	Report

==== Fifth place play-off ====
18 May 2023
16:00

Basel (Switzerland)	2–0	(England) Liverpool
	Report

==== Third place play-off ====
18 May 2023
18:20

Génération Foot (Senegal)	3–0	(Switzerland) Grasshopper
	Report

=== Knockout stage ===
==== Semi-finals ====
18 May 2023
15:00

Génération Foot (Senegal)	0–0	(Brazil) Corinthians
	Report
Penalties
	2–4

18 May 2023
16:00

Grasshopper (Switzerland)	0–2	(Switzerland) Zürich
	Report

==== Final ====
18 May 2023
18:20

Corinthians (Brazil)	0–0	(Switzerland) Zürich
	Report
Penalties
	0–2

2023 FIFA Youth Cup winners
(Switzerland)
Zürich
Sixth title

== Women's tournament ==
=== Group stage ===
==== Group A ====
Pos	Team	Pld	W	D	L	GF	GA	GD	Pts	Qualification	(Switzerland) ZUR	(Switzerland) BAS	(Sweden) ROS	(England) ARS
1	(Switzerland) Zürich	3	1	2	0	3	2	+1	5	Knockout stage	—			1–0
2	(Switzerland) Basel	3	1	2	0	2	1	+1	5	Knockout stage	1–1	—	1–0	
3	(Sweden) Rosengård	3	1	1	1	3	3	0	4		1–1		—	
4	(England) Arsenal	3	0	1	2	1	3	−2	1			0–0	1–2	—

Source: FIFA
Rules for classification: 1) Points; 2) Goal difference; 3) Goals scored; 4) Head-to-head performance; 5) Fair play ranking; 6) Drawing of lots.
17 May 2023
13:45

Arsenal (England)	0–0	(Switzerland) Basel
	Report

17 May 2023
13:45

Rosengård (Sweden)	1–1	(Switzerland) Zürich
	Report

17 May 2023
17:05

Arsenal (England)	1–2	(Sweden) Rosengård
	Report

17 May 2023
17:05

Basel (Switzerland)	1–1	(Switzerland) Zürich
	Report

18 May 2023
9:20

Zürich (Switzerland)	1–0	(England) Arsenal
	Report

18 May 2023
9:20

Basel (Switzerland)	1–0	(Sweden) Rosengård
	Report

==== Group B ====
Pos	Team	Pld	W	D	L	GF	GA	GD	Pts	Qualification	(Switzerland) YB	(Canada) VAN	(Switzerland) GCZ	(Italy) JUV
1	(Switzerland) YB Frauen	3	2	1	0	6	2	+4	7	Knockout stage	—	1–0	3–0	
2	(Canada) Vancouver Whitecaps	3	1	1	1	5	2	+3	4	Knockout stage		—	1–1	
3	(Switzerland) Grasshopper	3	1	1	1	5	5	0	4				—	4–1
4	(Italy) Juventus	3	0	1	2	3	10	−7	1		2–2	0–4		—

Source: FIFA
Rules for classification: 1) Points; 2) Goal difference; 3) Goals scored; 4) Head-to-head performance; 5) Fair play ranking; 6) Drawing of lots.
17 May 2023
14:35

Juventus (Italy)	2–2	(Switzerland) YB Frauen
	Report

17 May 2023
14:35

Vancouver Whitecaps (Canada)	1–1	(Switzerland) Grasshopper
	Report

17 May 2023
17:55

Juventus (Italy)	0–4	(Canada) Vancouver Whitecaps
	Report

17 May 2023
17:55

YB Frauen (Switzerland)	3–0	(Switzerland) Grasshopper
	Report

18 May 2023
10:10

Grasshopper (Switzerland)	4–1	(Italy) Juventus
	Report

18 May 2023
10:10

YB Frauen (Switzerland)	1–0	(Canada) Vancouver Whitecaps
	Report

=== Placement game ===
==== Seventh place play-off ====
18 May 2023
13:00

Arsenal (England)	0–2	(Italy) Juventus
	Report

==== Fifth place play-off ====
18 May 2023
14:00

Rosengård (Sweden)	2–0	(Switzerland) Grasshopper
	Report

==== Third place play-off ====
18 May 2023
17:00

Zürich (Switzerland)	0–1	(Switzerland) YB Frauen
	Report

=== Knockout stage ===
==== Bracket ====
Semi-finals
(Switzerland) Zürich	1 (3)
(Canada) Vancouver Whitecaps (p)	1 (5)
(Switzerland) YB Frauen	2 (4)
(Switzerland) Basel (p)	2 (5)

Final
(Canada) Vancouver Whitecaps (p)	1 (5)
(Switzerland) Basel	1 (4)
Third place
(Switzerland) Zürich	1
(Switzerland) YB Frauen	0

==== Semi-finals ====
18 May 2023
13:00

Zürich (Switzerland)	1–1	(Canada) Vancouver Whitecaps
	Report
Penalties
	3–5

18 May 2023
14:00

YB Frauen (Switzerland)	2–2	(Switzerland) Basel
	Report
Penalties
	4–5

==== Final ====
18 May 2023
17:00

Vancouver Whitecaps (Canada)	1–1	(Switzerland) Basel
	Report
Penalties
	5–4

2023 FIFA Youth Cup winners

Vancouver Whitecaps
First title

== Final standings ==
=== Men ===
Pos.	Team	G	Pld	W	D	L	Pts	GF	GA	GD
1st place, gold medalist(s)	(Switzerland) Zürich	A	5	2	3	0	9	7	2	+5
2nd place, silver medalist(s)	(Brazil) Corinthians	B	5	1	4	0	7	3	0	+3
3rd place, bronze medalist(s)	(Senegal) Génération Foot	A	5	3	1	1	10	6	3	+3
4	(Switzerland) Grasshopper	B	5	1	2	2	5	4	6	−2
5	(Switzerland) Basel	A	4	2	1	1	7	5	3	+2
6	(England) Liverpool	B	4	1	2	1	5	2	3	−1
7	(France) Marseille	A	4	1	1	2	4	4	4	0
8	(Switzerland) Blue Stars	B	4	0	0	4	0	0	10	−10

=== Women ===
Pos.	Team	G	Pld	W	D	L	Pts	GF	GA	GD
1st place, gold medalist(s)	(Canada) Vancouver Whitecaps	B	5	1	3	1	6	7	4	+3
2nd place, silver medalist(s)	(Switzerland) Basel	A	5	1	4	0	7	5	4	+1
3rd place, bronze medalist(s)	(Switzerland) YB Frauen	B	5	3	2	0	11	9	4	+5
4	(Switzerland) Zürich	A	5	1	3	1	6	4	4	0
5	(Sweden) Rosengård	A	4	2	1	1	7	5	3	+2
6	(Switzerland) Grasshopper	B	4	1	1	2	4	5	7	−2
7	(Italy) Juventus	B	4	1	1	2	4	5	10	−5
8	(England) Arsenal	A	4	0	1	3	1	1	5	−4
