= List of association football competitions using VAR =

Video assistant referee (VAR) technology is a relatively recent addition to the rules of association football, having only been officially codified in the Laws of the Game in 2018, and has been gradually adopted by an increasing number of competitions over time.

== Club competitions ==
=== International ===
- FIFA
  - FIFA Club World Cup
  - FIFA Intercontinental Cup
  - FIFA Women's Champions Cup
  - FIFA Women's Club World Cup
- UEFA–CONMEBOL
  - Under-20 Intercontinental Cup

=== Continental ===
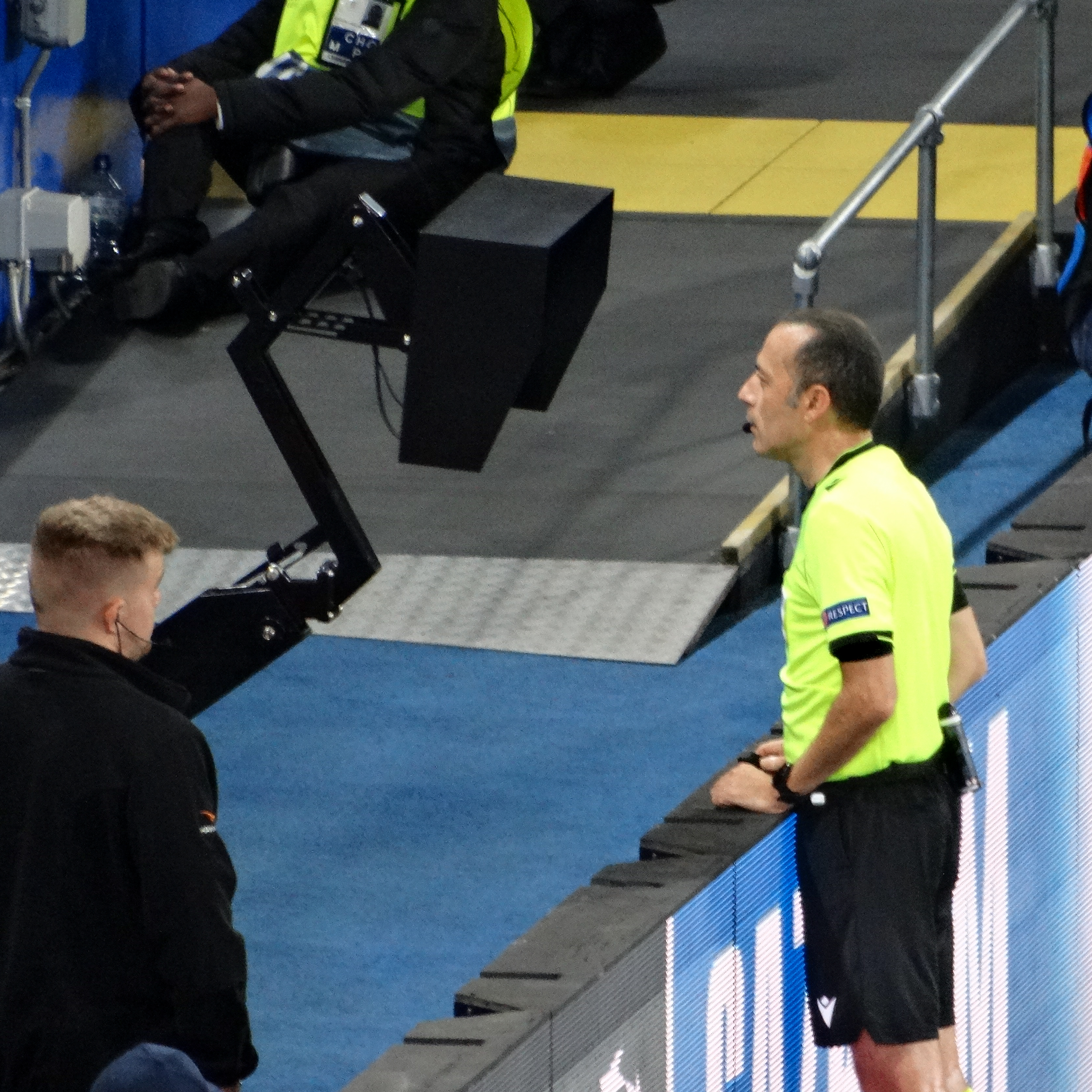
VAR in use in the UEFA Champions League group stage in 2019 by Cüneyt Çakır

- AFC
  - AFC Champions League Elite (Note: Competition proper only)
  - AFC Champions League Two (Note: Knockout stage and the final only)
  - AFC Challenge League (Note: Final only)
  - AFC Women's Champions League (Note: Semi-finals and the final only)
- CAF
  - CAF Champions League (Note: Competition proper only)
    - CAF Super Cup
  - CAF Confederation Cup
  - CAF Women's Champions League
- CONCACAF
  - CONCACAF Champions Cup
  - Leagues Cup
- CONMEBOL
  - CONMEBOL Copa Libertadores
    - CONMEBOL Recopa
  - CONMEBOL Copa Sudamericana
  - CONMEBOL Copa Libertadores Sub-20 (Note: Knockout stage and the final only)
  - CONMEBOL Copa Libertadores Femenina (Note: Semi-finals, 3rd place play-off and the final only)
- OFC
  - OFC Professional League
- UEFA
  - UEFA Champions League
    - UEFA Super Cup
  - UEFA Europa League
  - UEFA Conference League (Note: Third qualifying round onwards)
  - UEFA Youth League
  - UEFA Women's Champions League (Note: League phase onwards)

=== Regional ===
- AFF
  - ASEAN Club Championship
- UAFA
  - Arab Club Champions Cup

=== Domestic leagues ===
- (Albania) Kategoria Superiore
- (Algeria) Algerian Ligue 1
- (Argentina) AFA
  - Argentine Primera División
- Football Federation of Armenia
  - Armenian Premier League
- (Australia) Australian Professional Leagues
  - A-League Men
- (Austria) Österreichische Fußball Bundesliga
  - Austrian Bundesliga
- Azerbaijan Premier League
- (Belgium) RBFA
  - Pro League
- (Bolivia) Bolivian Primera División
- (Bosnia and Herzegovina) N/FSBiH
  - Bosnian Premier League
- (Brazil) CBF
  - Brasileirão
  - Brasileirão Série B
  - Brasileirão Série C (Note: Final stage only)
  - Brasileirão Série D (Note: Round of 16 in the play-off round onwards only)
  - Brasileirão Sub-20 (Note: Play-off final only)
  - Brasileirão Sub-17
  - Brasileirão Feminino A1
  - Brasileirão Feminino A2
  - Brasileirão Feminino A3
- (Brazil) FAF (Alagoas)
  - Campeonato Alagoano (Note: Semi-finals and final of the play-off round only)
- (Brazil) FAF (Amazonas)
  - Campeonato Amazonense
- (Brazil) FBF (Bahia)
  - Campeonato Baiano
- (Brazil) FCF (Santa Catarina)
  - Campeonato Catarinense (Note: Semi-finals and final of the play-off round and where requested and paid for by the clubs)
- (Brazil) FCF (Ceará)
  - Campeonato Cearense
- (Brazil) FERJ (Rio de Janeiro)
  - Campeonato Carioca
  - Campeonato Carioca Série A2
- (Brazil) FES (Espírito Santo)
  - Campeonato Capixaba
- (Brazil) FFDF (Federal District)
  - Campeonato Candango
- (Brazil) FGF (Rio Grande do Sul)
  - Campeonato Gaúcho (Note: Play-off round only)
- (Brazil) FGF (Goiás)
  - Campeonato Goiano
- (Brazil) FMF (Maranhão)
  - Campeonato Maranhense
- (Brazil) FMF (Minais Gerais)
  - Campeonato Mineiro
- (Brazil) FNF (Rio Grande do Norte)
  - Campeonato Potiguar
- (Brazil) FPF (Pará)
  - Campeonato Paraense
- (Brazil) FPF (Paraíba)
  - Campeonato Paraibano
- (Brazil) FPF (Paraná)
  - Campeonato Paranaense
- (Brazil) FPF (Pernambuco)
  - Campeonato Pernambucano (Note: Quarter-finals in the play-off round onwards only)
- (Brazil) FPF (São Paulo)
  - Campeonato Paulista
  - Campeonato Paulista Feminino
  - Campeonato Paulista Série A2
- (Brazil) FRF (Roraima)
  - Campeonato Roraimense
- (Brazil) FSF (Sergipe)
  - Campeonato Sergipano
- (Bulgaria) Bulgarian First League
- ANFP
  - Chilean Primera División
  - Primera B de Chile (Note: Promotion play-offs only)
  - Campeonato Chileno Feminino
- (China) Chinese Professional Football League
  - Chinese Super League
- (Colombia) DIMAYOR
  - Categoría Primera A
  - Categoría Primera B
- (Croatia) HNL
- (Cyprus) Cypriot First Division
- (Czech Republic) Czech First League
- (Denmark) DBU
  - Danish Superliga
- (Ecuador) Ecuadorian Football Federation
  - Ecuadorian Serie A
  - Ecuadorian Serie B
- (Egypt) EFA
  - Egyptian Premier League
- (England) Premier League
- (England) EFL
  - Championship
  - League One
  - League Two
- (Finland) Veikkausliiga
- (Estonia) EJL
  - Meistriliiga
- (France) Ligue de Football Professionnel
  - Ligue 1
- (France) FFF
  - Division 1 Féminine
- (Georgia (country)) Erovnuli Liga
- (Germany) Deutsche Fußball Liga
  - Bundesliga
  - 2. Bundesliga
- Super League Greece
  - Super League 1
- HKFA
  - Hong Kong Premier League
- (Hungary) MLSZ
  - Nemzeti Bajnokság I
- (Indonesia) I-League
  - Super League
  - Championship
- Iran Football League Organization
  - Persian Gulf Pro League
  - Azadegan League (in toss game)
- Iraq Stars League
- Israel Football Association
  - Israeli Premier League
- (Italy) Lega Serie A
  - Serie A
- (Italy) Lega B
  - Serie B
- (Italy) Lega Italiana Calcio Professionistico
  - Serie C (Note: Promotion play-offs and relegation play-outs only)
- (Japan) J.League
  - J1 League
  - J2 League
- (Jordan) Jordanian Pro League
- (Kazakhstan) Kazakh Premier League
- (Kosovo) Kosovar Superleague
- (Kuwait) Kuwaiti Premier League
- (Kuwait) Kuwaiti Division One
- (Latvia) Virslīga
- (Libya) Libyan Premier League
- (Lithuania) A Lyga
- Malaysian Football League
  - Malaysia Super League
- Football Federation of the Islamic Republic of Mauritania
  - Super D1
- (Mexico) Mexican Football Federation
  - Liga MX
  - Liga MX Femenil (Note: Liguilla only)
- (Morocco) FRMF
  - Botola
- (Netherlands) KNVB
  - Eredivisie
  - Eerste Divisie (Note: Promotion/relegation play-offs only)
- Nigeria Professional Football League
- (North Macedonia) Football Federation of Macedonia
  - 1. MFL
- (Norway) NFF
  - Eliteserien
- (Oman) Omani Professional League
- (Paraguay) Paraguayan Primera División
- (Peru) Liga 1
- (Poland) Ekstraklasa
- (Poland) PZPN
  - I Liga
  - II Liga
- Liga Portugal
  - Liga Portugal 1
  - Liga Portugal 2
- FPF
  - Liga 3 (Note: Promotion stage only)
  - Campeonato de Portugal (Note: Championship final only)
  - Campeonato Nacional Feminino
- QFA
  - Qatar Stars League
  - Qatari Second Division
- (Romania) LPF
  - Liga I
- (Russia) RFU
  - Russian Premier League
  - Russian First League (Note: Only for selected matches)
- (Saudi Arabia) SAFF
  - Saudi Pro League
  - Saudi First Division League
- (Scotland) SPFL
  - Scottish Premiership
- (Serbia) FSS
  - Serbian SuperLiga
- FAS
  - Singapore Premier League
- (South Korea) K League
  - K League 1
  - K League 2
- (Slovakia) SFZ
  - Slovak Super Liga
- (Slovenia) NZS
  - PrvaLiga
- (Spain) LaLiga
  - La Liga
  - La Liga 2
- (Spain) RFEF
  - RFEF Primera Federación
  - Liga F
- (Switzerland) ASF SFV
  - Swiss Super League
- (Tajikistan) Tajik Higher League
- (Thailand) Thai League
  - Thai League 1
  - Thai League 2
- (Tunisia) Tunisian Ligue 1
- (Turkey) TFF
  - Süper Lig
  - TFF 1. Lig
  - TFF 2. Lig
  - TFF 3. Lig (Note: Play-off finals only)
- (United Arab Emirates) UAE Pro League
- (Ukraine) Ukrainian Premier League
- (Ukraine) Ukrainian First League
- (United States) Major League Soccer
- (United States) National Women's Soccer League
- (Uruguay) Uruguayan Primera División
- Uzbekistan Super League
- (Venezuela) Venezuelan Primera División
- (Vietnam) VFF
  - V.League 1
  - V.League 2
  - Vietnamese Football League Second Division (Note: Only for selected matches)

=== Domestic cups ===
- (Albania) Albanian Cup (Note: Quarter-finals until final)
- (Albania) Albanian Super Cup
- (Algeria) Algerian Cup
- Football Australia
  - Australia Cup (Note: Certain finals only)
- (Austria) Austrian Cup
- AFA
  - Trofeo de Campeones
  - Supercopa Argentina
- (Belgium) RBFA
  - Belgian Cup
  - Belgian Super Cup
- (Brazil) CBF
  - Copa do Brasil (Note: Round of 32 ties until the final only)
  - Supercopa do Brasil
  - Supercopa do Brasil de Futebol Feminino
  - Copa do Nordeste
  - Copa Verde
  - Copa do Brasil Sub-20
  - Copa do Brasil Sub-17
- (Brazil) FPF (São Paulo)
  - Copa Paulista
  - Copinha
  - Copinha Feminina
- (Bulgaria) Bulgarian Cup
- (Bulgaria) Bulgarian Supercup
- Copa Chile
- Supercopa de Chile
- (Cyprus) Cypriot Super Cup
- (Denmark) DBU
  - DBU-Pokalen
  - Kvindepokalen
- EFA
  - Egypt Cup
  - Egyptian Super Cup
- (Egypt) Egyptian Professional Football Clubs Association
  - Egyptian League Cup
- (England) The Football Association
  - FA Cup (Note: Fifth round ties until the final only)
  - Women's FA Cup
  - Women's League Cup
  - FA Community Shield
- (England) EFL
  - EFL Cup
- (Finland) Finnish Cup
- FFF
  - Coupe de France (Note: Round of 8 ties until the final only)
  - Coupe de France Féminine
- (France) Ligue de Football Professionnel
  - Trophée des Champions
- (Germany) DFB
  - DFB-Pokal
  - DFB-Pokal Frauen
- (Germany) Deutsche Fußball Liga
  - Franz Beckenbauer Supercup
- (Greece) Greek Football Cup
- Hong Kong FA Cup
- Hong Kong Senior Challenge Shield
- (Indonesia) PSSI
  - Piala Presiden
- (Indonesia) Djarum Foundation
  - Srikandi Merdeka Cup
- IFA
  - Israel State Cup
  - Toto Cup (Note: Semi-finals and final as well as UEFA Conference League play-off only (Toto Cup Al))
  - Israel Super Cup
- (Italy) Lega Serie A
  - Coppa Italia (Note: Entire tournament bar the preliminary round)
  - Supercoppa Italiana
- (Italy) Coppa Italia Serie C
- (Japan) JFA
  - Emperor's Cup
- (Japan) J.League
  - J.League Cup
  - Japanese Super Cup
- (Kazakhstan) Kazakh Cup
- (Kazakhstan) Kazakh Super Cup
- (Kosovo) Kosovar Cup
- (Kuwait) Kuwaiti Emir Cup
- (Kuwait) Kuwaiti Crown Prince Cup
- (Kuwait) Kuwaiti Federation Cup
- (Kuwait) Kuwaiti Super Cup
- (Morocco) Moroccan Throne Cup
- (Netherlands) KNVB
  - KNVB Cup
  - Johan Cruyff Shield
- Malaysian Football League
  - Malaysia FA Cup
  - Malaysia Cup
  - MFL Challenge Cup
  - Piala Sumbangsih
- Northern Ireland Football League Cup (Note: Final only)
- (Norway) NFF
  - NM Cupen
  - NM Cupen (Women)
- (Oman) His Majesty's Cup
- (Poland) Polish Cup
- (Poland) Polish Super Cup
- FPF
  - Taça de Portugal
  - Supertaça de Portugal
  - Taça de Portugal Feminina
  - Taça da Liga Feminina
  - Supertaça de Portugal Feminina
- Liga Portugal
  - Taça da Liga
- (Qatar) Qatari Emir Cup
- (Qatar) Qatari FA Cup
- (Qatar) Qatari Stars Cup
- (Romania) Romanian Cup (Note: Group stage onwards (Liga I stadiums only))
- (Romania) Romanian Super Cup
- (Russia) Russian Cup (Note: Group stage onwards (Russian Premier League path) + selected matches of regions path)
- (Russia) Russian Super Cup
- (Saudi Arabia) King's Cup
- (Saudi Arabia) Saudi Super Cup
- (Scotland) Scottish Football Association
  - Scottish Cup (Note: Fourth round onwards, only at Premiership stadiums for televised matches or where agreed, plus the semi-finals and final)
  - Scottish Women's Cup
- (Scotland) SPFL
  - SPFL League Cup
- (Serbia) FSS
  - Serbian Cup
  - Serbian Women's Cup
- (South Korea) KFA
  - Korean FA Cup
- (Spain) RFEF
  - Copa del Rey
  - Supercopa de España
  - Copa de la Reina
  - Supercopa de España Femenina
- (Thailand) Thai FA Cup
- (Thailand) Thai League Cup
- Thailand Champions Cup
- (Tunisia) Tunisian Cup
- (Turkey) TFF
  - Turkish Cup
  - Turkish Super Cup
- (Ukraine) Ukrainian Cup
- (Ukraine) Ukrainian Super Cup
- (United States) USSF
  - US Open Cup
- (United States) NWSL Challenge Cup
- (Uruguay) Supercopa Uruguaya
- (Vietnam) VFF
  - Vietnamese Cup
  - Vietnamese Super Cup
- (Zambia) ABSA Cup

== National team competitions ==
=== International ===
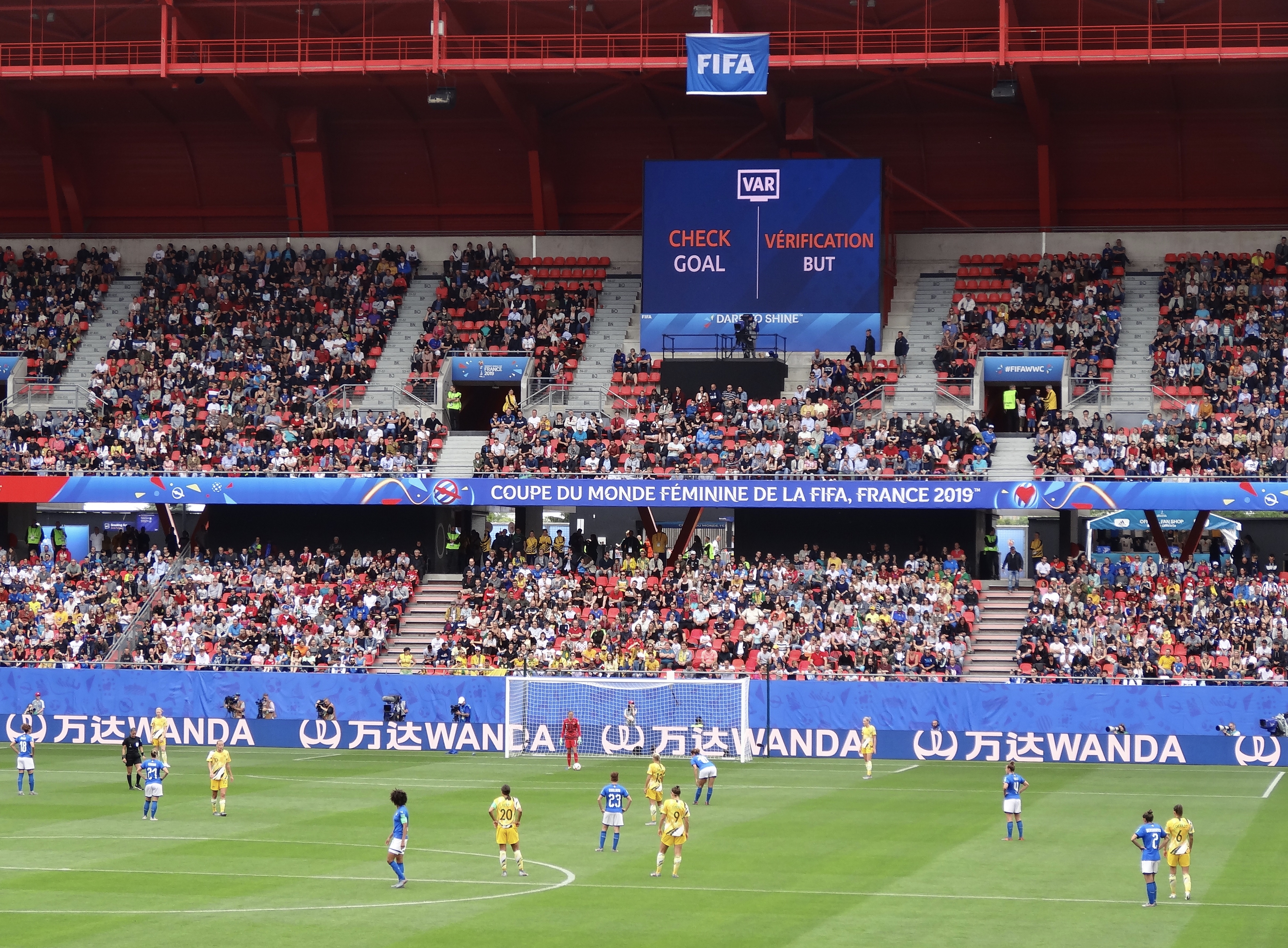
VAR in use at the 2019 FIFA Women's World Cup in France.

- FIFA
  - FIFA World Cup
    - Qualification (Note: All games (UEFA and CONMEBOL), third round onwards (AFC), third round only (CONCACAF and CAF) and inter-confederation play-offs)
  - FIFA Arab Cup
  - FIFA ASEAN Cup
  - FIFA Series
  - FIFA U-20 World Cup
  - FIFA U-17 World Cup
  - FIFA Women's World Cup
    - Qualification (Note: Play-offs only (UEFA) and inter-confederation play-offs)
  - FIFA U-20 Women's World Cup
  - FIFA U-17 Women's World Cup
- IOC
  - Football at the Summer Olympics
- CONMEBOL–UEFA
  - Finalissima
  - Women's Finalissima

=== Continental ===
- AFC
  - AFC Asian Cup
  - AFC U-23 Asian Cup
  - AFC Women's Asian Cup
  - AFC U-20 Asian Cup
  - AFC U-17 Asian Cup
- CAF
  - CAF Africa Cup of Nations
  - CAF African Nations Championship
  - CAF U-23 Africa Cup of Nations
  - CAF U-20 Africa Cup of Nations
  - CAF U-17 Africa Cup of Nations
  - CAF Women's Africa Cup of Nations
- CONCACAF
  - CONCACAF Gold Cup
    - Qualification
  - CONCACAF Nations League (Note: Quarter-finals onwards)
  - CONCACAF U-20 Championship
  - CONCACAF W Gold Cup
  - CONCACAF W Championship
  - CONCACAF Women's U-20 Championship
- CONMEBOL
  - CONMEBOL Copa América
  - CONMEBOL Preolímpico
  - CONMEBOL Copa América Feminina
  - CONMEBOL Sub-20 Feminina
  - CONMEBOL Sub-17 Feminina
- UEFA
  - UEFA European Championship
    - Qualification
  - UEFA Nations League
  - UEFA European Under-21 Championship
  - UEFA Women's Championship
  - UEFA Women's Nations League (Note: Final four only)

=== Regional ===
- AFF
  - ASEAN Championship
- AGCFF
  - Arabian Gulf Cup
- COSAFA
  - COSAFA Cup
  - COSAFA Women's Championship
- EAFF
  - EAFF E-1 Football Championship
