= Amel Rustemoski =

Macedonian footballer (born 2000)

Personal information
- Date of birth: 6 July 2000 (age 26)
- Place of birth: Würenlos, Switzerland
- Height: 1.85 m (6 ft 1 in)
- Position: Forward

Youth career
- 2008–2010: SV Würenlos
- 2010–2012: FC Zürich
- 2012–2019: Grasshopper

Senior career*
Years	Team	Apps	(Gls)
2018–2020	Grasshopper U21	32	(17)
2019–2020	Grasshopper	16	(0)
2020	→ Kriens (loan)	9	(0)
2021–2022	Wil	11	(1)
2022–2023	Schaffhausen	13	(0)

International career^{‡}
2014	Switzerland U15	1	(0)
2015	Macedonia U16	2	(0)
2017–2018	Switzerland U18	3	(3)
2018–2019	Switzerland U19	5	(1)
2021–2022	North Macedonia U21	5	(0)
- * Club domestic league appearances and goals as of 19 June 2023 ‡ National team caps and goals as of 30 March 2022

Amel Rustemoski (Albanian: Amel Rustemi; born 6 July 2000) is a footballer who plays as a forward. Born in Switzerland, he is a youth international for North Macedonia.

== Club career ==
On 13 July 2022, Rustemoski signed with Schaffhausen.

== Career statistics ==
=== Club ===
As of 9 April 2019.

Club	Season	League			Cup		Continental		Other		Total	
Club	Season	Division	Apps	Goals	Apps	Goals	Apps	Goals	Apps	Goals	Apps	Goals
Grasshoppers U21	2018–19	1. Liga	19	8	0	0	–		0	0	19	8
Grasshoppers	2018–19	Swiss Super League	1	0	0	0	–		0	0	1	0
Career total			20	8	0	0	0	0	0	0	20	8
