= Blue Stars/FIFA Youth Cup =

- Organiser(s): FIFA (since 1991)
- Founded: 1939
- Region: International
- Teams: Men: 10; Women: 6
- Current champions: Men: (Switzerland) Zürich (6th title); Women: (Canada) Vancouver Whitecaps (1st title)
- Most championships: Men: (England) Manchester United (18 titles); Women: (Canada) Vancouver Whitecaps (Germany) VfL Wolfsburg (Switzerland) Young Boys (Switzerland) Zürich (1 title each)
- Website: Official website
- 2024 Blue Stars/FIFA Youth Cup

Founded by FC Blue Stars, Blue Stars Zürich Youth Cup is an international youth club football tournament. The Zürich-based club were one of the first to have a separate youth section. This youth section expanded to include a tournament involving the best youth teams in the world. Recognising its importance to youth football, FIFA took over the 'Blue Stars Tournament' in 1991, before re-branding it in 1995 as the Blue Stars/FIFA Youth Cup.

The women's tournament started in 2018. Young Boys women team won the first edition.

The tournament was under the patronage of FIFA until 2024. After a one-year hiatus the tournament will take place again in 2026 as the Blue Stars Zurich Youth Cup.

Games are played in two 20-minute halves (25 for the final), only players between 18 and 20 years may participate. However, each team may have up to five players under the age of 18 feature. It is held on Ascension Thursday and the following day at the Buchlern sports stadium in Zürich.

== Performance by club ==
=== Men ===
Club	Titles	Runners-up	Years won	Years runner-up
(England) Manchester United	18	7	1954, 1957, 1959, 1960, 1961, 1962, 1965, 1966, 1968, 1969, 1975, 1976, 1978, 1979, 1981, 1982, 2004, 2005	1955, 1964, 1971, 1973, 1974, 1991, 1994
(Switzerland) Grasshopper	7	6	1939, 1956, 1971, 1987, 1998, 2006, 2016	1949, 1946, 1996, 2001, 2009, 2012
(Switzerland) Zürich	6	9	1946, 1949, 2008, 2012, 2013, 2023	1953, 1961, 1999, 2004, 2007, 2010, 2011, 2015, 2024
(Switzerland) Basel	3	2	1997, 2009, 2022	1951, 2008
(Switzerland) Young Fellows Zürich	3	—	1941, 1942, 1953	—
(Spain) Barcelona	3	—	1993, 1994, 1995	—
(Argentina) Boca Juniors	3	—	2002, 2010, 2019	—
Austria Wien	2	—	1947, 1948	—
(England) Arsenal	2	—	1963, 1964	—
(Italy) Milan	2	—	1958, 1977	—
(Russia) Spartak Moscow	2	—	1991, 1992	—
(Brazil) São Paulo	2	—	1999, 2000	—
(Italy) Roma	2	—	1980, 2003	—
(Switzerland) Aarau	1	3	1943	1942, 1944, 1948
(Portugal) Benfica	1	3	1996	1997, 2014, 2019
(Italy) Atalanta	1	1	1974	1970
(Brazil) Grêmio	1	1	2001	2002
(Serbia) Partizan	1	1	2007	1990
(Switzerland) Winterthur	1	—	1940	—
(Switzerland) Servette	1	—	1944	—
(Switzerland) Örlikon	1	—	1945	—
(Austria) Wiener Sport-Club	1	—	1950	—
(France) Strasbourg	1	—	1951	—
(England) Birmingham City	1	—	1952	—
(Italy) Genoa	1	—	1955	—
(Germany) 1860 Munich	1	—	1967	—
(Switzerland) Young Boys	1	—	1970	—
(Switzerland) Lausanne-Sport	1	—	1972	—
(Germany) Borussia Dortmund	1	—	1973	—
(Italy) Inter Milan	1	—	1983	—
(England) Chelsea	1	—	1984	—
(Italy) Cremonese	1	—	1985	—
(Scotland) Celtic	1	—	1986	—
(Bosnia and Herzegovina) FK Sarajevo	1	—	1988	—
(England) Nottingham Forest	1	—	1989	—
(Spain) Real Madrid	1	—	1990	—
(Portugal) Porto	1	—	2011	—
(Brazil) Atlético Paranaense	1	—	2014	—
(Switzerland) FC Luzern	1	—	2015	—
(France) Lyon	1	—	2017	—
(Croatia) Dinamo Zagreb	1	—	2018	—
(Austria) RB Salzburg	1	—	2024	—
(Germany) Mainz	—	1	—	2022
(Brazil) Corinthians	—	1	—	2023

=== Women ===
Club	Titles	Runners-up	Years won	Years runner-up
(Switzerland) Young Boys	1	1	2018	2019
(Germany) Wolfsburg	1	—	2019	—
(Switzerland) Zürich	1	—	2022	—
(Canada) Vancouver Whitecaps	1	—	2023	—
(England) Arsenal	1	—	2024	—
(Switzerland) Basel	—	2	—	2023, 2024
(Spain) Valencia	—	1	—	2018
(France) Lyon	—	1	—	2022

=== Total wins by country ===
Nation	Titles	Runners-up	Years won	Years runner-up
Switzerland	28	21	2022, 2023	2019, 2023
England	23	7	2005	1994
Italy	8		2003	
Spain	5		1995	2018
Brazil	4	1	2014	2023
Argentina	3		2019	
Germany	3	1	2019	2022
Croatia	1		2018	
Austria	3		1950	
France	2	1	2017	2022
Portugal	2	3	2011	2019
Russia	2		1992	
(Bosnia and Herzegovina) Bosnia	1		1988	
Canada	1		2023	
Serbia	1	1	2007	1990
