= 2024 Blue Stars/FIFA Youth Cup =

Tournament details
- Host country: Switzerland
- Dates: 8 & 9 May 2024
- Teams: Men: 8 Women: 8
- Venue(s): Buchlern Sports Facility, Zürich

Final positions
- Champions: Men: (Austria) RB Salzburg (1st title); Women: (England) Arsenal (1st title)
- Runners-up: Men: (Switzerland) Zürich; Women: (Switzerland) Basel

Tournament statistics
- Matches played: 35
- Goals scored: 69 (1.97 per match)
- Best player(s): Men: (Austria) Oghenetejiri Adejenughure (RB Salzburg); Women: (England) Maddy Earl (Arsenal)
- Best goalkeeper: Men: (Switzerland) Silas Huber (Zürich); Women: (Switzerland) Inna Fuchs (Basel)
- Fair play award: Men: (France) Strasbourg; Women: (Germany) RB Leipzig

The 2024 Blue Stars/FIFA Youth Cup was the 84th edition of the Blue Stars/FIFA Youth Cup, an association football tournament organized by FIFA for clubs featuring players under the age of 19. It was held on 8 and 9 May 2024. Participants were announced on 30 April 2024. The schedule was also published on 30 April 2024.

== Participating teams ==
Eight men and women's teams are split into two groups of four each. Reigning champions of the men's tournament FC Zürich return to defend their title.

Group	Men	Women
A	(Germany) Mönchengladbach	(England) Arsenal Women
A	(Switzerland) Grasshopper Club	(France) Olympique Lyonnes
A	(Switzerland) St. Gallen	(Switzerland) Basel Frauen
A	(Senegal) Génération Foot	(Switzerland) Zürich Frauen
B	(Switzerland) Blue Stars	(Switzerland) YB Frauen
B	(Austria) RB Salzburg	(Spain) Valencia Femenino
B	(France) RC Strasbourg	(Switzerland) Grasshopper Club
B	(Switzerland) FC Zürich	(Germany) RB Leipzig

== Men's tournament ==
=== Group stage ===
==== Group A ====
Pos	Team	Pld	W	D	L	GF	GA	GD	Pts	Qualification	(Switzerland) STG	(Switzerland) GCZ	(Germany) BMG	(Senegal) GFA
1	(Switzerland) St. Gallen	3	2	1	0	3	1	+2	7	Knockout stage	—		1–0	
2	(Switzerland) Grasshopper	3	0	3	0	3	3	0	3	Knockout stage	1–1	—		1–1
3	(Germany) Mönchengladbach	3	0	2	1	1	2	−1	2			1–1	—	0–0
4	(Senegal) Génération Foot	3	0	2	1	1	2	−1	2		0–1			—

Source: FIFA
Rules for classification: 1) Points; 2) Goal difference; 3) Goals scored; 4) Head-to-head performance; 5) Fair play ranking; 6) Drawing of lots.
8 May 2024
15:25

Mönchengladbach (Germany)	1–1	(Switzerland) Grasshopper
Michael Nduka	Report	Leart Kabashi

8 May 2024
15:25

Génération Foot (Senegal)	0–1	(Switzerland) St. Gallen
	Report	Lindon Ibishi

8 May 2024
19:00

Mönchengladbach (Germany)	0–0	(Senegal) Génération Foot
	Report

8 May 2024
19:00

Grasshopper (Switzerland)	1–1	(Switzerland) St. Gallen
	Report

9 May 2024
11:00

St. Gallen (Switzerland)	1–0	(Germany) Mönchengladbach
	Report

9 May 2024
11:00

Grasshopper (Switzerland)	1–1	(Senegal) Génération Foot
	Report

==== Group B ====
Pos	Team	Pld	W	D	L	GF	GA	GD	Pts	Qualification	(Austria) RBS	(Switzerland) ZUR	(France) RCS	(Switzerland) BSZ
1	(Austria) RB Salzburg	3	2	1	0	10	2	+8	7	Knockout stage	—	2–2	1–0	
2	(Switzerland) Zürich	3	2	1	0	7	2	+5	7	Knockout stage		—	1–0	4–0
3	(France) Strasbourg	3	1	0	2	1	2	−1	3				—	1–0
4	(Switzerland) Blue Stars	3	0	0	3	0	12	−12	0		0–7			—

Source: FIFA
Rules for classification: 1) Points; 2) Goal difference; 3) Goals scored; 4) Head-to-head performance; 5) Fair play ranking; 6) Drawing of lots.
8 May 2024
16:15

RB Salzburg (Austria)	2–2	(Switzerland) Zürich
	Report

8 May 2024
16:15

Strasbourg (France)	1–0	(Switzerland) Blue Stars
	Report

8 May 2024
19:50

RB Salzburg (Austria)	1–0	(France) Strasbourg
	Report

8 May 2024
19:50

Zürich (Switzerland)	4–0	(Switzerland) Blue Stars
	Report

9 May 2024
11:50

Blue Stars (Switzerland)	0–7	(Austria) RB Salzburg
	Report

9 May 2024
11:50

Zürich (Switzerland)	1–0	(France) Strasbourg
	Report

=== Placement games ===
==== Seventh place play-off ====
9 May 2024
15:00

Génération Foot (Senegal)	2–0	(Switzerland) Blue Stars
Ibrahima Sory Sow; Kalfara Camara	Report

==== Fifth place play-off ====
9 May 2024
16:00

Mönchengladbach (Germany)	0–0	(France) Strasbourg
	Report

==== Third place play-off ====
9 May 2024
18:20

St. Gallen (Switzerland)	1–2	(Switzerland) Grasshopper
Lendrit Dellova	Report	Miguel Martins; Dior Gerbovci

=== Knockout stage ===
==== Bracket ====
Semi-finals
(Switzerland) St. Gallen	0
(Switzerland) Zürich	5
(Austria) RB Salzburg (p)	0 (2)
(Switzerland) Grasshopper	0 (0)

Final
(Switzerland) Zürich	1
(Austria) RB Salzburg	4
Third place
(Switzerland) St. Gallen	1
(Switzerland) Grasshopper	2

==== Semi-finals ====
9 May 2024
15:00

St. Gallen (Switzerland)	0–5	(Switzerland) Zürich
	Report	Joseph Sabobo; Mahar Sajawal; Joseph Sabobo; Dylan Monroe; Leandro Schödler

9 May 2024
16:00

RB Salzburg (Austria)	0–0	(Switzerland) Grasshopper
	Report
Penalties
	2–0

==== Final ====
9 May 2024
18:20

Zürich (Switzerland)	1–4	(Austria) RB Salzburg
	Report

2024 FIFA Youth Cup winners

First title

== Women's tournament ==
=== Group stage ===
==== Group A ====
Pos	Team	Pld	W	D	L	GF	GA	GD	Pts	Qualification	(Switzerland) BAS	(England) ARS	(France) OL	(Switzerland) ZUR
1	(Switzerland) Basel	3	2	1	0	4	2	+2	7	Knockout stage	—		1–0	1–0
2	(England) Arsenal	3	1	1	1	5	3	+2	4	Knockout stage	2–2	—	0–1	
3	(France) Lyon	3	1	1	1	1	1	0	4				—	0–0
4	(Switzerland) Zürich	3	0	1	2	0	4	−4	1			0–3		—

Source: FIFA
Rules for classification: 1) Points; 2) Goal difference; 3) Goals scored; 4) Head-to-head performance; 5) Fair play ranking; 6) Drawing of lots.
8 May 2024
13:45

Lyon (France)	0–0	(Switzerland) Zürich
	Report

8 May 2024
13:45

Arsenal (England)	2–2	(Switzerland) Basel
Courtney Clarke; Ruby Seaby	Report	Fabienne Saladin; (o.g.)

8 May 2024
17:05

Lyon (France)	1–0	(England) Arsenal
	Report

8 May 2024
17:05

Zürich (Switzerland)	0–1	(Switzerland) Basel
	Report

9 May 2024
9:20

Basel (Switzerland)	1–0	(France) Lyon
	Report

9 May 2024
9:20

Zürich (Switzerland)	0–3	(England) Arsenal
	Report

==== Group B ====
Pos	Team	Pld	W	D	L	GF	GA	GD	Pts	Qualification	(Germany) RBL	(Switzerland) YB	(Switzerland) GCZ	(Spain) VAL
1	(Germany) RB Leipzig	3	1	2	0	4	1	+3	5	Knockout stage	—	0–0		3–0
2	(Switzerland) YB Frauen	3	1	2	0	2	1	+1	5	Knockout stage		—	1–0	1–1
3	(Switzerland) Grasshopper	3	1	1	1	4	3	+1	4		1–1		—	
4	(Spain) Valencia	3	0	1	2	2	7	−5	1				1–3	—

Source: FIFA
Rules for classification: 1) Points; 2) Goal difference; 3) Goals scored; 4) Head-to-head performance; 5) Fair play ranking; 6) Drawing of lots.
8 May 2024
14:35

Valencia (Spain)	1–3	(Switzerland) Grasshopper
Rebeca Andrés	Report	Noemie Ivelj; Janina Egli; Valentina Gerlof

8 May 2024
14:35

RB Leipzig (Germany)	0–0	(Switzerland) YB Frauen
	Report

8 May 2024
17:55

Valencia (Spain)	0–3	(Germany) RB Leipzig
	Report

8 May 2024
17:55

Grasshopper (Switzerland)	0–1	(Switzerland) YB Frauen
	Report

9 May 2024
10:10

Valencia (Spain)	1–1	(Switzerland) YB Frauen
	Report

9 May 2024
10:10

Grasshopper (Switzerland)	1–1	(Germany) RB Leipzig
	Report

=== Placement games ===
==== Seventh place play-off ====
9 May 2024
13:00

(Switzerland) Zürich	1–0	(Spain) Valencia
Lisa Lampart	Report

==== Fifth place play-off ====
9 May 2024
14:00

(France) Lyon	2–0	(Switzerland) Grasshopper
Carmille Marmillot; Kelya Figueira	Report

=== Knockout stage ===
==== Bracket ====
Semi-finals
(Switzerland) Basel	2
(Switzerland) YB Frauen	1
(Germany) RB Leipzig	0 (1)
(England) Arsenal (p)	0 (3)

Final
(Switzerland) Basel	0 (3)
(England) Arsenal (p)	0 (4)

==== Semi-finals ====
9 May 2024
13:00

(Switzerland) Basel	2–1	(Switzerland) YB Frauen
Emilia Soiron; Lola Almert	Report	Meret Arnold

9 May 2024
14:00

(Germany) RB Leipzig	0–0	(England) Arsenal
	Report
Penalties
	1–3

==== Final ====
9 May 2024
17:00

(Switzerland) Basel	0–0	(England) Arsenal
	Report
Penalties
	3–4

2024 FIFA Youth Cup winners

First title

== Final standings ==
=== Men ===
Pos.	Team	G	Pld	W	D	L	Pts	GF	GA	GD
1st place, gold medalist(s)	(Austria) RB Salzburg	B	5	3	2	0	11	14	3	+11
2nd place, silver medalist(s)	(Switzerland) Zürich	B	5	3	1	1	10	13	6	+7
3rd place, bronze medalist(s)	(Switzerland) Grasshopper	A	5	1	4	0	7	5	4	+1
4	(Switzerland) St. Gallen	A	5	2	1	2	7	4	8	−4
5	(France) RC Strasbourg	B	4	1	1	2	4	1	2	−1
6	(Germany) Mönchengladbach	A	4	0	3	1	3	1	2	−1
7	(Senegal) Génération Foot	A	4	0	2	2	2	3	2	+1
8	(Switzerland) Blue Stars	B	4	0	0	4	0	0	14	−14

=== Women ===
Pos.	Team	G	Pld	W	D	L	Pts	GF	GA	GD
1	(Switzerland) Basel	A	5	3	2	0	11	6	3	+3
2	(France) Olympique Lyonnais	A	4	2	1	1	7	3	1	+2
3	(Germany) RB Leipzig	B	4	1	3	0	6	4	1	+3
4	(England) Arsenal	A	5	1	3	1	6	5	3	+2
5	(Switzerland) YB Frauen	B	4	1	2	1	5	3	3	0
6	(Switzerland) Grasshopper	B	4	1	1	2	4	4	5	−1
7	(Switzerland) Zürich	A	4	1	1	2	4	1	4	−3
8	(Spain) Valencia CF Femenino	B	4	0	1	3	1	2	8	−6
