= VAR in chess =

Chess referee software

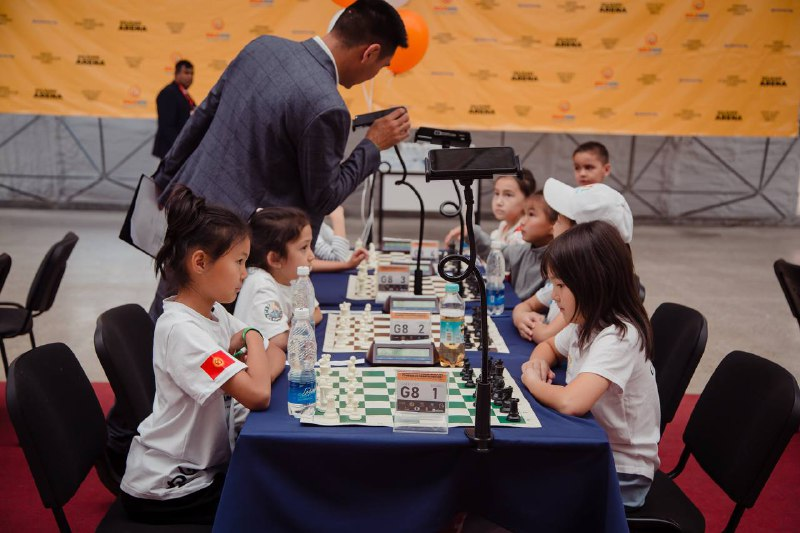
VAR implementation at the Western Asian Youth Chess Championship 2023 in Kyrgyzstan among children under the ages of 6 to 18

Video assistant referee system in chess, abbreviated as VAR, is a technology that helps chess arbiters at chess competitions make the right decisions in disputable situations. The International Chess Federation officially announced the video assistance system for arbiters on July 3, 2023. It was first used at the Western Asian Youth Chess Championship among children, boys and girls under the ages of 6–18, held from June 30 to July 10, 2023

Viewing controversial episodes is based on the idChess technology, created by the international IT company Friflex in 2019, that allows to broadcast games played on a real chess board.

== Procedure ==
According to FIDE, the use of VAR in chess can be divided into three stages:

=== Controversial moments ===
If a controversy arose, a chess player is able to apply to an arbiter, according to Article 7.4.2 of FIDE chess rules from January 1, 2023: If necessary, either the player or his/her opponent shall pause the chessclock and ask for the arbiter's assistance. If the arbiter has missed the moment of violation, then when making a decision, he can only be guided by the presumption of innocence if the tournament is not broadcast using VAR technology.

=== VAR review and recommendations ===
The idChess application digitizes the game and records the video of the chess board. Thanks to artificial intelligence, VAR shows which moves were made, which allows the arbiter to quickly find controversial moments. Thus, the arbiter can review the disputed episode using VAR: if necessary, pause the video, rewind it by navigating through the move marks or the timeline. The broadcast of the game is suspended until the circumstances are clarified.

=== Decision making ===
Having reviewed the episode using VAR technology, the arbiter makes the final verdict based on the competition regulations. Then the broadcast of the game continues.

== Implementation ==
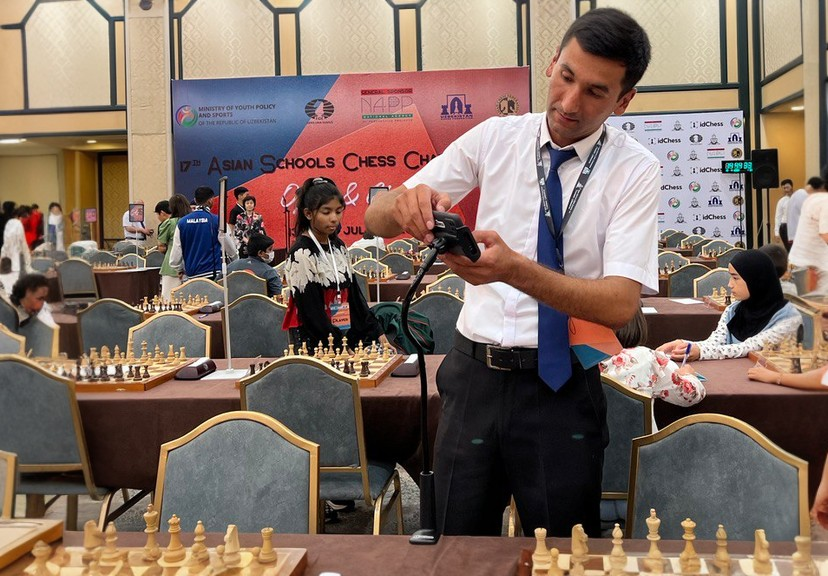
Implementation of VAR at the Asian Schools Chess Championship in Uzbekistan

At the beginning of July 2023, FIDE approved the use of the video help system in international tournaments. For the first time, this technology was applied at the Western Asian Youth Chess Championship 2023, held in Kyrgyzstan, where it received positive feedback from international arbiters and representatives of federations

The next major tournament using the VAR system was the Asian Schools Chess Championship 2023. The system was used in the categories under the ages of 7, 9, and 11.

Najmiddin Umarov, FIDE Arbiter, stated that:

With the help of VAR, we examined 25 cases of violations in only one round in the categories of boys under the age of 7 and 9.

=== Media and public reaction ===
The news about the introduction of the VAR system in chess caused a resonance in the media in many countries. Articles about the event appeared in news outlets in Kyrgyzstan, Poland, Russia, Spain, the United States of America, Uzbekistan and other countries.

The initiative received very mixed reviews from chess grandmasters. For example, Ian Nepomniachtchi and Sergey Karyakin expressed a neutral attitude to the news but emphasized that the system could be useful in certain situations. Sergey Shipov agreed that the system would contribute to resolving controversial issues, and emphasized the particular usefulness of VAR for chess:

There are many controversial situations in chess because there is no limit to human cunning and trickery.

Anatoly Karpov expressed his opinion in a negative way, stating that the technology "will only make life difficult for chess players." The arbiters who used the video assistance system in tournaments were satisfied with the innovations, expressing mostly positive comments:

Zhohangir Kamalov, international arbiter, chief arbiter of Asian Schools Chess Championship 2023:

"The system provided to us by the idChess team was installed at our tournament in several categories: under the age of 7, 9, and 11. It performed well: when there were many difficulties, especially in the category under the age of 7, we watched the video, and if everything was confirmed, the game was continued, if not — we issued a warning."

Jamshed Vatanov, FIDE Arbiter, Tajikistan:

"VAR idChess makes the work of chess arbiters easier: recording games disciplines children during the game, and they do not break the rules when they see that the camera is installed and recording is in progress."
