= 2026–27 Women's 1. Liga (Switzerland) =

1. Liga
- Season: 2026–27
- Dates: 15 August 2026 –
- Matches: 132
- Goals: 492 (3.73 per match)
- Biggest home win: Lausanne-Sport 8–0 Lausanne Nord (30 August 2026)
- Biggest away win: Concordia Basel 0–8 Lausanne-Sport (8 November 2026)
- Highest scoring: Renens 5–4 Solothurn (29 August 2026); Solothurn 6–3 Erlinsbach (19 September 2026); Wädenswil 5–4 Luzern (10 October 2026)
- Longest winning run: 11 matches Lausanne-Sport
- Longest unbeaten run: 11 matches Wädenswil; Lausanne-Sport
- Longest winless run: 8 matches Lausanne Nord
- Longest losing run: 7 matches Lausanne Nord
- All statistics correct as of 8 November 2026.

The 2026–27 Women's 1. Liga is the current season of the Women's 1. Liga, the third-tier women's association football competition in Switzerland.

== Format ==
The league consists of 24 teams split into two groups of 12, with the winners of each group earning promotion to the Nationalliga B and advancing to the league championship, while the three lowest-finishing teams in each group are relegated to the 2. Liga regional leagues.

== Team changes ==
=== Promoted from 2025–26 1. Liga ===
- AS Gambarogno
- FFV Basel

== League tables ==
=== Group 1 ===
Pos	Team	Pld	W	D	L	GF	GA	GD	Pts	Status
1	Lausanne-Sport	11	11	0	0	49	3	+46	33	Qualification to the championship and promoted to Nationalliga B
2	Düdingen	11	7	2	2	29	11	+18	23	
3	Biel-Bienne	11	7	2	2	25	17	+8	23	
4	Sempach	11	7	1	3	26	17	+9	22	
5	Terre Sainte	11	4	3	4	22	20	+2	15	
6	Erlinsbach	11	3	4	4	18	27	−9	13	
7	Solothurn	11	4	0	7	27	26	+1	12	
8	Renens	11	3	3	5	15	19	−4	12	
9	Concordia Basel	11	3	3	5	14	27	−13	12	
10	Courrendlin-Courroux	11	2	2	7	19	35	−16	8	Relegated to the 2. Liga
11	Lausanne Nord	11	2	1	8	15	39	−24	7	Relegated to the 2. Liga
12	Sissach	11	1	3	7	13	31	−18	6	Relegated to the 2. Liga

Updated to match(es) played on 8 November 2026. Source: SFA

==== Results ====
Home \ Away	LAU	REN	BIE	COU	TER	ERL	DUD	SOL	LNO	CON	SEM	SIS
Lausanne-Sport		2–1		3–1		7–0	2–0		8–0		4–0	
Renens				0–1		1–1		5–4		0–1		1–1
Biel-Bienne	0–6	3–0		5–1	2–2	3–1	2–1					
Courrendlin-Courroux							1–5			2–3		5–3
Terre Sainte	0–6	2–1		3–3		0–1	0–3				0–1	
Erlinsbach				1–1			1–3		3–1	2–0	2–2	
Düdingen		1–1						4–1	4–1	1–1	2–1	5–0
Solothurn	0–1		0–2	6–1	1–4	6–3						
Lausanne Nord		3–4	1–4	4–2	0–7			0–3		1–1		3–0
Concordia Basel	0–8		0–1		2–2			3–2				2–3
Sempach		0–1	4–2	2–1				3–2	3–1	5–1		5–1
Sissach	1–2		1–1		0–2	3–3		0–2				

Updated to match(es) played on 8 November 2026. Source: SFA
Legend: Blue = home team win; Yellow = draw; Red = away team win.

=== Group 2 ===
Pos	Team	Pld	W	D	L	GF	GA	GD	Pts	Status
1	Wädenswil	11	10	1	0	34	13	+21	31	Qualification to the championship and promoted to Nationalliga B
2	Schwyz	11	7	3	1	24	8	+16	24	
3	Bühler	11	6	3	2	20	12	+8	21	
4	Luzern	11	5	4	2	20	15	+5	19	
5	Eschenbach	11	5	3	3	23	18	+5	18	
6	Blue Stars	11	5	0	6	13	16	−3	15	
7	Toggenburg	11	4	2	5	22	19	+3	14	
8	Baar	11	2	5	4	14	16	−2	11	
9	Winterthur-Wiesendangen	11	1	5	5	16	24	−8	8	
10	Mels	11	2	2	7	13	23	−10	8	Relegated to the 2. Liga
11	Staad	11	2	2	7	11	27	−16	8	Relegated to the 2. Liga
12	Balerna	11	1	2	8	10	29	−19	5	Relegated to the 2. Liga

Updated to match(es) played on 8 November 2026. Source: SFA

==== Results ====
Home \ Away	WAE	ESC	SCW	BUH	LUZ	BLU	BAA	MEL	TOG	BAL	WIW	STA
Wädenswil		2–2	2–0	4–1	5–4	2–0		2–1				
Eschenbach							4–3		0–2	6–0	2–1	5–2
Schwyz		2–2		2–0	4–0	2–1		3–1	2–0			
Bühler		3–0					0–0		3–2		2–1	2–0
Luzern		2–0		1–1		2–0		2–2	3–0		2–2	
Blue Stars		0–1		0–3			2–0		3–2		3–0	
Baar	2–4		0–0		1–1			2–0		2–0		1–1
Mels		1–1		1–4		3–1				2–1		0–1
Toggenburg	0–1						3–2	4–1		6–1	2–2	1–1
Balerna	1–4		0–1	1–1	0–2	0–1						
Winterthur-Wiesendangen	1–3		2–2				1–1	2–1		3–3		1–3
Staad	1–5		0–6		0–1	1–2				1–3		

Updated to match(es) played on 8 November 2026. Source: SFA
Legend: Blue = home team win; Yellow = draw; Red = away team win.
