= FC Biel-Bienne Women =

- Founded: 2022
- League: Women's 1. Liga
- 2025–26: Women's 1. Liga group 1, 4th

FC Biel-Bienne Women is a Swiss women's association football club that currently competes in the Women's 1. Liga, the third tier of Swiss women's football.

== History ==
The club was first founded in 2022, as part of a merge organized between FC Biel-Bienne and FC Walperswil. They entered into Nationalliga B for the 2022–23 season. The team finished in 6th place in their first season in the league. Biel-Bienne were subsequently relegated in the following season.
