= Women's 1. Liga (Switzerland) =

- Founded: 1980
- First season: 1980–81
- Country: Switzerland
- Number of clubs: 24 (in 2 groups of 12)
- Level on pyramid: 3
- Promotion to: Nationalliga B
- Relegation to: 2. Liga
- Current champions: AS Gambarogno (2025–26)
- Current: 2026–27 Women's 1. Liga (Switzerland)

The Women's 1. Liga is the third-tier women's association football club competition in Switzerland. In 1980, the Swiss Football Association introduced a third tier to women's football, below the modern-day Nationalliga B. AS Gambarogno are currently the defending champions following their championship win in the 2025–26 season.
