= 2022–23 FC St. Gallen season =

FC St. Gallen
2022–23 season
- President: Matthias Hüppi
- Head coach: Peter Zeidler
- Stadium: Kybunpark
- Swiss Super League: 6th
- Swiss Cup: Quarter-finals
- Top goalscorer: League: Emmanuel Latte Lath (14); All: Emmanuel Latte Lath (16)
- Average home league attendance: 17,553

The 2022–23 FC St. Gallen season was the club's 144th season in existence and the 11th consecutive season in the top flight of Swiss football. In addition to the domestic league, FC St. Gallen participated in this season's edition of the Swiss Cup. The season covered the period from 1 July 2022 to 30 June 2023.

== Players ==
=== First-team squad ===
As of 1 October 2022

Note: Flags indicate national team as defined under FIFA eligibility rules; some limited exceptions apply. Players may hold more than one non-FIFA nationality.

No.	Pos.	Nation	Player
1	GK	GHA	Lawrence Ati-Zigi
4	DF	SUI	Leonidas Stergiou
5	DF	CRO	Matej Maglica
6	MF	SUI	Basil Stillhart
7	FW	AUT	Fabian Schubert
8	MF	ESP	Jordi Quintillà
9	FW	SUI	Jérémy Guillemenot
11	FW	SUI	Julian von Moos
13	MF	GER	Leonhard Münst (on loan from VfB Stuttgart II)
16	MF	GER	Lukas Görtler
19	DF	MLI	Daouda Guindo (on loan from Red Bull Salzburg)
20	DF	AUT	Albert Vallci
22	FW	CIV	Emmanuel Latte Lath (on loan from Atalanta)
23	MF	SUI	Gregory Karlen
24	DF	PHI	Michael Kempter

No.	Pos.	Nation	Player
25	GK	GER	Lukas Watkowiak
27	MF	SUI	Randy Schneider
28	MF	SUI	Ricardo Azevedo Alves
29	DF	SUI	Alessandro Kräuchi
30	DF	SUI	Patrick Sutter
31	FW	SUI	Alessio Besio
32	MF	SUI	David Jacovic
33	DF	SUI	Isaac Schmidt
34	MF	SUI	Stefano Guidotti
35	GK	SUI	Bela Dumrath
37	MF	SUI	Christian Witzig
50	FW	SUI	Fabrizio Cavegn
56	MF	KOS	Edis Bytyqi
77	FW	COD	Chadrac Akolo
93	FW	FRA	Noha Ndombasi

=== Out on loan ===
Note: Flags indicate national team as defined under FIFA eligibility rules; some limited exceptions apply. Players may hold more than one non-FIFA nationality.

No.	Pos.	Nation	Player
—	DF	SUI	Nicolas Lüchinger (at Thun until 30 June 2023)
—	DF	GHA	Musah Nuhu (at KuPS until 31 December 2022)

No.	Pos.	Nation	Player
—	FW	FRA	Élie Youan (at Hibernian until 30 June 2023)

== Transfers ==
=== In ===
No.	Pos	Player	Transferred from	Fee	Date	Source
15			TBD		1 July 2022	

=== Out ===
No.	Pos	Player	Transferred to	Fee	Date	Source
15			TBD		1 July 2022	

== Pre-season and friendlies ==
Win Draw Loss

9 July 2022 Friendly	St. Gallen (Switzerland)	3–4	(Germany) SC Freiburg	Schruns, Germany
15:00 CEST (UTC+2)	Von Moos 12'; Guindo 27'; Schubert 63'		Schmid 2'; Gulde 59'; Dōan 85'; Höler 109'	Stadium: Sportplatz Golm; Attendance: 1,000
Note: Match was played in two 60-minute halves.

20 July 2022 Friendly	St. Gallen (Switzerland)	0–2	(Spain) Valencia	Gossau, Switzerland
19:00 CEST (UTC+2)	Witzig (yellow card) 51'; Quintillà (yellow card) 75'; Kräuchi (yellow card) 90'		Koindredi 54'; Musah (yellow card) 75'; Marcos André (yellow card) 85'; Guedes 88'	Stadium: Sportanlage Buechenwald; Referee: Fedayi San (Switzerland)

16 August 2022 Friendly	Brühl (Switzerland)	2–4	(Switzerland) St. Gallen
CEST (UTC+2)

22 September 2022 Friendly	1. FC Nürnberg (Germany)	4–3	(Switzerland) St. Gallen	Nuremberg, Germany
13:00 CEST (UTC+2)				Stadium: Max-Morlock-Platz im Sportpark Valznerweiher

17 December 2022 Friendly	Union Berlin (Germany)	4–1	(Switzerland) St. Gallen	Berlin, Germany
14:30 CET (UTC+1)				Stadium: Stadion An der Alten Försterei

8 January 2023 Friendly	Werder Bremen (Germany)	2–2	(Switzerland) St. Gallen	San Pedro del Pinatar, Spain
15:30 CET (UTC+1)				Stadium: Pinatar Arena

11 January 2023 Friendly	St. Gallen (Switzerland)	1–0	(Germany) SC Paderborn	San Pedro del Pinatar, Spain
15:00 CET (UTC+1)				Stadium: Pinatar Arena

15 January 2023 Friendly	St. Gallen (Switzerland)	0–1	(Austria) Rheindorf Altach	St. Gallen
15:00 CET (UTC+1)				Stadium: kybunpark

23 March 2023 Friendly	FC Augsburg (Germany)	4–2	(Switzerland) St. Gallen	Augsburg, Germany
14:00 CET (UTC+1)				Stadium: WWK Arena

== Competitions ==
=== Overview ===
Competition	First match	Last match	Starting round	Final position	Record							
Competition	First match	Last match	Starting round	Final position	Pld	W	D	L	GF	GA	GD	Win %
Swiss Super League	17 July 2022	29 May 2023	Matchday 1	6th	36	11	12	13	66	52	+14	30.56
Swiss Cup	21 August 2022	1 March 2023	Round 1	Quarter-finals	4	3	0	1	25	4	+21	75.00
Total					40	14	12	14	91	56	+35	35.00

Source: Soccerway

=== Swiss Super League ===
==== League table ====
Pos	Team	Pld	W	D	L	GF	GA	GD	Pts	Qualification or relegation
4	Luzern	36	13	11	12	56	52	+4	50	Qualification for the Europa Conference League second qualifying round
5	Basel	36	11	14	11	51	50	+1	47	Qualification for the Europa Conference League second qualifying round
6	St. Gallen	36	11	12	13	66	52	+14	45	
7	Grasshopper	36	12	8	16	56	64	−8	44	
8	Zürich	36	10	14	12	41	55	−14	44	

Source: Swiss Super League
Rules for classification: 1) Points; 2) Goal difference; 3) Goals scored; 4) Head-to-head goal difference; 5) Away goals scored; 6) Draw.

==== Results summary ====
Overall								Home						Away					
Pld	W	D	L	GF	GA	GD	Pts	W	D	L	GF	GA	GD	W	D	L	GF	GA	GD
36	11	12	13	66	52	+14	45	8	6	4	37	21	+16	3	6	9	29	31	−2

==== Results by round ====
Round	1
Ground	
Result	
Position	

A = Away; H = Home; W = Win; D = Draw; L = Loss

==== Matches ====
===== First half of season =====
17 July 2022 1	Servette	1–0	St. Gallen	Stade de Genève, Lancy
16:30 CET	Rodelin 5'; Antunes (yellow card) 46'	SFL summary Report	Maglica (yellow card) 15'; Schubert (yellow card) 58'	Attendance: 4,872; Referee: (Switzerland) Lukas Fähndrich

23 July 2022 2	St. Gallen	2–0	Winterthur	Kybunpark, St. Gallen
20:30	Schubert 20'; Schubert 40'	SFL summary		Attendance: 15,673; Referee: (Switzerland) Sven Wolfensberger

30 July 2022 3	St.Gallen	2–0	Zürich	Kybunpark, St. Gallen
18:00 CEST	von Moos 20' 45+1'; Latte Lath (yellow card) 26'; Schmidt (red card) 73'	SFL summary Report	Boranijašević (yellow card) 21'; Kostadinović (yellow card) 52'; Condé (yellow card) 78'; Gogia (yellow card) 87'	Attendance: 17,838; Referee: (Switzerland) Lukas Fähndrich

6 August 2022 4	Grasshopper	3–2	St. Gallen	Letzigrund, Zürich
20:30 CEST (UTC+2)	Bolla (yellow card) 15'; Momoh 20'; Ndenge 45+2', 69'; Margreitter (yellow card) 85'; Pusic (yellow card) 90+6'	Report	5' (yellow card) 46' Latte Lath; 12' Schuber; (yellow card) 16' Maglica; (yellow card) 34' Witzig; (red card) 90+6' Ati-Zigi	Attendance: 6,678; Referee: Luca Piccolo; Assistant referees: Sandro Schärer (VAR); Man of the Match: Tsiy-William Ndenge

13 August 2022 5	St. Gallen	4–1	Luzern	Kybunpark, St. Gallen
20:30	Latte Lath 2'; Simani 51' (o.g.); Görtler 56'; Akolo 69'	SFL summary	60' Chader; (yellow card) 81' Kadák	Attendance: 16,609; Referee: (Switzerland) Urs Schnyder

28 August 2022 6	Lugano	2–3	St. Gallen	Cornaredo, Lugano
14:15	Celar 6'; Mahmoud (yellow card) 33'; Ziegler (yellow card) 57'; Babic 65'	SFL summary	(yellow card) 5' Sutter; 29' Guillemenot; 45+2' Witzig; 59' Görtler; (yellow card) 79' Guindo; (yellow card) 90+3' Vallci	Attendance: 3,357; Referee: (Switzerland) Stefan Horisberger

4 September 2022 7	St. Gallen	2–1	Young Boys	Kybunpark, St. Gallen
16:30 CEST	Witzig (yellow card) 17'; Jordi Quintillà (yellow card) 29'; Guindo 54' (yellow card) 68'; Schmidt 64'	SFL summary Report	Garcia (red card) 21'; Itten (yellow card) 29'; Zesiger (yellow card) 46' (yellow-red card) 72' (goal) 62'	Attendance: 19,200; Referee: (Switzerland) Fedayi San

10 September 2022 8	St. Gallen	1–2	Sion	Kybunpark, St. Gallen
18:00	Guillemenot (yellow card) 17'; Latte Lath (yellow card) 50'; Stillhart (yellow card) 62'; Karlen 87'; Görtler (yellow card) 90'	SFL report	18' Chouaref; 28' Stojilković; (yellow card) 54' Araz; (yellow card) 73' Sio; (yellow card) 89' Batata; (yellow card) 90+1' Grgić	Attendance: 18,579; Referee: (Switzerland) Luca Cibelli

1 October 2022 9	Basel	3–2	St. Gallen	St. Jakob-Park, Basel
18:00	Amdouni 15'; Zigi 17' (o.g.); Burger (yellow card) 22'; Comas (yellow card) 79'; Fink 83'; Xhaka (yellow card) 87'; Augustin (yellow card) 90+3'; Lang (yellow card) 90+4'	SFL summary FCB report	6' Guillemenot; (yellow card) 24' Maglica; (yellow card) 30' Akolo; (yellow card) 33' Schmidt; (red card) 36' Stillhart; (yellow card) 36' Zigi; (yellow card) 38' Görtler; 71' (pen.) Görtler	Attendance: 22,630; Referee: (Switzerland) Sandro Schärer (Buttikon)

8 October 2022 10	Young Boys	2–1	St. Gallen	Stadion Wankdorf, Bern
20:30 CEST	Nsame 13'; Ugrinic (yellow card) 81'; Stergiou 87' (o.g.)	SFL summary Report	Görtler (yellow card) 21'; Chadrac Akolo 38'	Attendance: 26,525; Referee: (Switzerland) Urs Schnyder

16 October 2022 11	St. Gallen	1–1	Lugano	Kybunpark, St. Gallen
14:15	Görtler (yellow card) 5'; Akolo 9'; Vallci (yellow card) 10'; Schmidt (yellow card) 36'	SFL summary	(yellow card) 45+1' Arigoni; (yellow card) 60' Saipi; 83' Celar; (yellow card) 90+4' Haile-Selassie	Attendance: 17,059; Referee: (Switzerland) Sven Wolfensberger

19 October 2022 12	Luzern	3–3	St. Gallen	Swissporarena, Luzern
20:30	Dräger 7'; Dräger 45'; Meyer 55' (pen.); Dräger (yellow card) 65'; Meyer (yellow card) 67'; Burch (yellow card) 86'; Emini (yellow card) 87'	SFL summary	9' Latte Lath; 40' Guillemenot; (yellow card) 67' Guidotti; (yellow card) 74' Schmidt; 83' von Moos; (yellow card) 87' von Moos	Attendance: 20,336; Referee: (Switzerland) Luca Piccolo

23 October 2022 13	St. Gallen	1–1	Servette	Kybunpark, St. Gallen
16:30 CET	Vallci (yellow card) 45'; Pflücke 53' (o.g.)	SFL summary Report	Kutsea 41'; Cognat (yellow card) 64'; Céspedes (yellow card) 77'; Douline (yellow card) 90+1'; Clichy (yellow card) 90+3'	Attendance: 16,679; Referee: (Switzerland) Fedayi San

30 October 2022 14	Winterthur	1–0	St. Gallen	Stadion Schützenwiese, Winterthur
16:30	Burkart 21'; Ramizi (yellow card) 26'; Seiler (yellow card) 87'	SFL summary	(yellow card) 42' Maglica; (yellow card) 61' Schmidt	Attendance: 8,400 (sold out); Referee: (Switzerland) Johannes von Mandach

5 November 2022 15	St. Gallen	2–1	Grasshopper	Kybunpark, St. Gallen
18:00 CET (UTC+1)	Guillemenot 20'; Vallci (yellow card) 25'; Stillhart 55'	SFL summary	(yellow card) 16' Loosli; (yellow card) 25' (goal) 48' Herc; (yellow card) 34' Kawabe	Attendance: 18,517; Referee: Esther Staubli; Assistant referees: Sandro Schärer (VAR)

12 November 2022 16	Sion	2–7	St. Gallen	Stade Tourbillon, Sion
18:00	Balotelli 5' (pen.); Saintini (yellow card) 42'; Cavaré (yellow card) 53'; Zuffi (yellow card) 56'; Sio 90'; Halabaku (yellow card) 90+5'	SFL summary	(yellow card) 4' Guindo; 27' Latte Lath; (yellow card) 30' Quintillà; 31' Akolo; 39' Latte Lath; 43' Görtler; 44' Görtler; 50' Latte Lath; (yellow card) 52' Görtler; (yellow card) 55' Latte Lath; 60' Stillhart; (yellow card) 64' Stillhart; (yellow card) 90+5' Watkowiak	Attendance: 10,500; Referee: (Switzerland) Sven Wolfensberger

22 January 2023 17	St. Gallen	1–1	Basel	Kybunpark, St. Gallen
16:30	Guillemenot 5'; Guillemenot (yellow card) 6'; Quintillà (yellow card) 38'; Alves (yellow card) 75'	SFL summary FCB report	(yellow card) 19' Calafiori; 30' Amdouni; (yellow card) 79' López; (yellow card) 89' Frei	Attendance: 19,200; Referee: (Switzerland) Urs Schnyder

29 January 2023 18	Zürich	1–0	St. Gallen	Letzigrund, Zürich
16:30	Krasniqi (red card) 17'; Šimić (yellow card) 18'; Boranijašević (yellow card) 68'; Hornschuh 88'	SFL summary	(yellow card) 45' Alves; (yellow card) 86' Quintillà	Attendance: 14,950; Referee: (Switzerland) Luca Piccolo

4 February 2023 19	St. Gallen	3–0	Servette	Kybunpark, St. Gallen
20:30 CET	Görtler 8'; Guillemenot 39' (pen.) (yellow card) 45+4'; Geubbels (yellow card) 76' (goal) 89'	SFL summary Report	(yellow card) 26' (yellow-red card) 64' Céspedes; (yellow card) 45+3' Kutsea; (yellow card) 60' Magnin	Attendance: 14,806; Referee: (Switzerland) Sven Wolfensberger

12 February 2023 20	Young Boys	5–1	St. Gallen	Stadion Wankdorf, Bern
16:30 CET	Itten 12' 54' (pen.); Imeri 17'; Fassnacht 62'; Rieder 66' (pen.)	SFL summary Report	3' Görtler; (yellow card) 65' Stergiou	Attendance: 27,164; Referee: (Switzerland) Urs Schnyder

19 February 2023 21	St. Gallen	2–2	Luzern	Kybunpark, St. Gallen
14:30	Guillemenot 14' (pen.); Dajaku (yellow card) 57'; Maglica 79' (pen.)	SFL summary	(yellow card) 13' Frýdek; 32' Frýdek; (yellow card) 45' Jashari; (yellow card) 54' Schürpf; 62' Beloko	Attendance: 17,126; Referee: (Switzerland) Fedayi San

25 February 2023 22	Sion	0–4	St. Gallen	Stade Tourbillon, Sion
18:00	Araz (yellow card) 22'; Balotelli (yellow card) 36'	SFL summary	(yellow card) 26' Quintillà; 33' Akolo; 49' Stillhart; 60' Karlen; 69' (pen.) Guillemenot; (yellow card) 81' Guillemenot; (yellow card) 85' Maglica	Attendance: 7,300; Referee: (Switzerland) Stefan Horisberger

5 March 2023 23	St. Gallen	1–1	Grasshopper	Kybunpark, St. Gallen
14:15 CET (UTC+1)	Karlen 33'; Witzig (yellow card) 55'; Stillhart (yellow card) 80'	SFL summary	5' Schettine; (yellow card) 35' Seko; (yellow card) 48' Dadashov; (yellow card) 67' Morandi; (yellow card) 86' Abrashi	Attendance: 18,484; Referee: (Switzerland) Lukas Fähndrich

12 March 2023 24	Basel	1–1	St. Gallen	St. Jakob-Park, Basel
16:30	Burger (yellow card) 76'; Zeqiri 82'	SFL summary FCB report	(yellow card) 35' Vallci; 52' Latte Lath; (yellow card) 64' Witzig	Attendance: 22,625; Referee: (Switzerland) Fedayi San (Gebenstorf)

19 March 2023 25	Winterthur	1–0	St. Gallen	Stadion Schützenwiese, Winterthur
14:15	Arnold (yellow card) 33'; Holenstein 53'; Abedini (yellow card) 71'	SFL summary	(yellow card) 45' Görtler; (yellow card) 70' Schmidt	Attendance: 8,400 (sold out); Referee: (Switzerland) Stefan Horisberger

26 April 2023 26	St. Gallen	2–2	Zürich	Kybunpark, St. Gallen
16:30	Guillemenot 44'; Latte Lath 51'; Stillhart (yellow card) 52'; Stergiou (yellow card) 70'; Dajaku (yellow card) 73' (yellow-red card) 90+1'	SFL summary	(yellow card) 23' Aliti; 26' Tosin; (yellow card) 36' (yellow-red card) 85' Omeragić; (yellow card) 44' Brecher; (yellow card) 44' Džemaili; 56' Okita; (yellow card) 90+3' Kryeziu	Attendance: 19,540; Referee: (Switzerland) Sven Wolfensberger

10 April 2023 27	Lugano	1–1	St. Gallen	Cornaredo, Lugano
14:15	Hajdari (yellow card) 13'; Steffen 22'; Steffen (yellow card) 63'; Facchinetti (yellow card) 90+4'	SFL summary	(yellow card) 61' Görtler; (yellow card) 85' Vallci; (yellow card) 90+3' Quintillà; 90+5' (pen.) Akolo	Attendance: 4,882; Referee: (Switzerland) Stefan Horisberger

16 April 2023 28	St. Gallen	2–3	Winterthur	Kybunpark, St. Gallen
14:30	Latte Lath (yellow card) 12'; Schmidt 18'; Guillemenot 28'; Guillemenot (yellow card) 80'; Ati-Zigi (yellow card) 82'; Görtler (yellow card) 90+2'	SFL summary	7' Burkart; 37' Di Giusto; 43' Di Giusto; (yellow card) 52' Lekaj; (yellow card) 56' Ltaief; (yellow card) 74' Arnold; (yellow card) 90+2' Rodríguez; (yellow card) 90+4' Kryeziu	Attendance: 18,376; Referee: (Switzerland) Esther Staubli

23 April 2023 29	Zürich	1–0	St. Gallen	Letzigrund, Zürich
16:30	Okita 57' (pen.); Kryeziu (yellow card) 62'	SFL summary	(yellow card) 34' Vallci; (yellow card) 83' Quintillà; (red card) 85' Dajaku	Attendance: 16,585; Referee: (Switzerland)

26 April 2023 30	St. Gallen	1–2	Lugano	Kybunpark, St. Gallen
20:30	Witzig 19'; Guillemenot (yellow card) 36'; Schmidt (yellow card) 61'; Maglica (yellow card) 66'; Ati-Zigi (yellow card) 67'	SFL summary	(yellow card) 15' Arigoni; 57' Amoura; 86' Bislimi	Attendance: 12,622; Referee: (Switzerland) Luca Cibelli

29 April 2023 31	Servette	1–1	St. Gallen	Stade de Genève, Geneva
20:30	Mbabu (yellow card) 26'; Bedia 42'; Clichy (yellow card) 58'; Diba (yellow card) 90+1'	SFL summary	(yellow card) 23' Witzig; 28' Witzig; (yellow card) 88' Görtler	Attendance: 7,072; Referee: (Switzerland) Sandro Schärer

6 May 2023 32	St. Gallen	0–2	Young Boys	Kybunpark, St. Gallen
20:30		SFL summary	Itten 53' (pen.); Nsame 83'	Referee: (Switzerland) Luca Piccolo

14 May 2023 33	St. Gallen	6–1	Basel	Kybunpark, St. Gallen
18:00	Guillemenot 22'; Görtler 24'; Quintillà 36'; Latte Lath 52'; Latte Lath 63'; Geubbels 90+1'; Geubbels (yellow card) 90+2'	SFL summary	(yellow card) 34' Millar; (yellow card) 45' Males; 54' Zeqiri	Attendance: 18,846; Referee: (Switzerland) Luca Cibelli
