= 2021–22 FC St. Gallen season =

FC St. Gallen
2021–22 season
- Chairman: Matthias Hüppi
- Manager: Peter Zeidler
- Stadium: Kybunpark
- Swiss Super League: 5th
- Swiss Cup: Runners-up
- Top goalscorer: League: Kwadwo Duah (15); All: Kwadwo Duah (18)

The 2021–22 season was FC St. Gallen's 143rd season in existence and the club's tenth consecutive season in the top flight of Swiss football. In addition to the domestic league, St. Gallen participated in this season's editions of the Swiss Cup.

== Players ==
=== First-team squad ===
As of 31 January 2022

No.	Pos.	Nation	Player
1	GK	GHA	Lawrence Ati-Zigi
3	DF	GHA	Musah Nuhu
4	DF	SUI	Leonidas Stergiou
6	MF	SUI	Basil Stillhart
7	FW	AUT	Fabian Schubert
8	MF	ESP	Jordi Quintillà
9	FW	SUI	Jérémy Guillemenot
10	MF	ESP	Víctor Ruiz
11	MF	SUI	Kwadwo Duah
13	MF	GER	Leonhard Münst (on loan from Stuttgart II)
14	DF	CRO	Matej Maglica (on loan from Stuttgart II)
15	DF	POR	Euclides Cabral
16	MF	GER	Lukas Görtler
18	GK	GER	Lukas Watkowiak
19	FW	SUI	Julian Von Moos
23	DF	KOS	Betim Fazliji

No.	Pos.	Nation	Player
24	DF	PHI	Michael Kempter
27	GK	SUI	Armin Abaz
28	FW	SUI	Christopher Lungoyi (on loan from Juventus)
29	MF	SUI	Alessandro Kräuchi
30	MF	SUI	Patrick Sutter
31	FW	SUI	Alessio Besio
32	MF	SUI	David Jacovic
33	MF	SUI	Isaac Schmidt
34	FW	SUI	Boris Babic
37	MF	SUI	Christian Witzig
44	FW	SUI	Logan Clément
45	MF	SUI	Alexandre Jankewitz (on loan from Young Boys)
50	DF	SUI	Nicolas Lüchinger
55	MF	BFA	Salifou Diarrassouba (on loan from ASEC Mimosas)
72	MF	SUI	Bastien Toma (on loan from Genk)

=== Out on loan ===
Note: Flags indicate national team as defined under FIFA eligibility rules; some limited exceptions apply. Players may hold more than one non-FIFA nationality.

No.	Pos.	Nation	Player
—	MF	SUI	Miro Muheim (at Hamburger SV until 30 June 2022)
—	MF	SUI	Tim Staubli (at Vaduz until 30 June 2022)
—	FW	SUI	Angelo Campos (at SC Brühl until 31 December 2021)

No.	Pos.	Nation	Player
—	FW	SUI	Lorenzo González (at Ústí nad Labem until 30 June 2022)
—	FW	SUI	Florian Kamberi (at Sheffield Wednesday until 30 June 2022)
—	FW	FRA	Élie Youan (at Mechelen until 30 June 2022)

== Pre-season and friendlies ==
Win Draw Loss Fixtures

10 July 2021 Friendly	VfB Stuttgart (Germany)	3–0	(Switzerland) St. Gallen	Stuttgart, Germany
15:00 CEST (UTC+2)	Al Ghaddioui 47', 49', 51'			Stadium: Robert-Schlienz-Stadion; Attendance: 1,300

17 July 2021 Friendly	St. Gallen (Switzerland)	2–1	(Spain) Athletic Bilbao	St. Gallen, Switzerland
16:00 CEST (UTC+2)	Besio 19'; Youan 36'		Fazliji 38' (o.g.)	Stadium: Kybunpark; Attendance: 6,261; Referee: David Huwiler

13 January 2022 Friendly	St. Gallen (Switzerland)	5–5	(Switzerland) Winterthur	St. Gallen, Switzerland
15:00 CET (UTC+1)		Report		Stadium: Gründenmoos Kunststoffrasenplatz

15 January 2022 Friendly	Rheindorf Altach (Austria)	1–4	(Switzerland) St. Gallen	Altach, Austria
15:00 CET (UTC+1)		Report		Stadium: Stadion Schnabelholz

19 January 2022 Friendly	Wil (Switzerland)	0–1	(Switzerland) St. Gallen	Wil, Switzerland
15:00 CET (UTC+1)		Report		Stadium: Stadion Bergholz

23 January 2022 Friendly	Schaffhausen (Switzerland)	1–3	(Switzerland) St. Gallen	Schaffhausen, Switzerland
14:30 CET (UTC+1)		Report		Stadium: Wefox Arena

24 March 2022 Friendly	St. Gallen (Switzerland)	9–0	(Austria) FC Dornbirn	St. Gallen, Switzerland
15:00 CET (UTC+1)

== Competitions ==
=== Overall record ===
Competition	First match	Last match	Starting round	Record							
Competition	First match	Last match	Starting round	Pld	W	D	L	GF	GA	GD	Win %
Swiss Super League	24 July 2021	21 May 2022	Matchday 1	29	11	8	10	53	51	+2	37.93
Swiss Cup	14 August 2021		Round 1	4	4	0	0	16	4	+12	100.00
Total				33	15	8	10	69	55	+14	45.45

Source: Soccerway

=== Swiss Super League ===
==== League table ====
Pos	Team	Pld	W	D	L	GF	GA	GD	Pts	Qualification or relegation
3	Young Boys	36	16	12	8	80	50	+30	60	Qualification for Europa Conference League second qualifying round
4	Lugano	36	16	6	14	50	54	−4	54	Qualification for Europa Conference League third qualifying round (Note: Lugano qualified for the Europa Conference League third qualifying round as the 2021–22 Swiss Cup champions.)
5	St. Gallen	36	14	8	14	68	63	+5	50	
6	Servette	36	12	8	16	50	66	−16	44	
7	Sion	36	11	8	17	46	67	−21	41	

Source: Swiss Super League
Rules for classification: 1) Points; 2) Goal difference; 3) Goals scored; 4) Head-to-head goal difference; 5) Away goals scored; 6) Draw.

==== Results summary ====
Overall								Home						Away					
Pld	W	D	L	GF	GA	GD	Pts	W	D	L	GF	GA	GD	W	D	L	GF	GA	GD
29	11	8	10	53	51	+2	41	5	7	3	28	25	+3	6	1	7	25	26	−1

Last updated: 10 April 2022.

==== Results by round ====
Round	1	2	3	4	5	6	7	8	9	10	11	12	13	14	15	16	17	18	19	20	21	22	23	24	25	26	27	28	29
Ground	A	H	A	H	H	A	H	A	A	H	A	H	A	H	A	H	H	A	A	H	H	A	H	A	H	A	H	A	H
Result	W	D	L	D	D	L	L	L	L	W	L	W	W	L	L	L	D	L	W	D	W	W	W	D	D	W	W	W	D
Position																													

Source: Soccerway
A = Away; H = Home; W = Win; D = Draw; L = Loss

==== Matches ====
The league fixtures were announced on 24 June 2021.

===== First half of season =====
24 July 2021 Round 1	Lausanne-Sport	1–2	St. Gallen	Stade de la Tuilière, Lausanne
20:30		SFL summary		Attendance: 4,632; Referee: (Switzerland) Urs Schnyder

1 August 2021 Round 2	St. Gallen	2–2	Luzern	Kybunpark, St. Gallen
14:15	Ruiz 1'; Babic 13'	SFL summary	82' Ugrinic; 90+6' Tasar	Attendance: 12,548; Referee: (Switzerland) Adrien Jaccottet (Basel)

8 August 2021 Round 3	Lugano	2–1	St. Gallen	Cornaredo, Lugano
14:15		SFL summary		Attendance: 2,692; Referee: (Switzerland) Urs Schnyder

21 August 2021 Round 4	St. Gallen	1–1	Sion	Kybunpark, St. Gallen
20:30		SFL summary		Attendance: 11,927; Referee: (Switzerland) Lukas Fähndrich

28 August 2021 Round 5	St. Gallen	3–3	Zürich	Kybunpark, St. Gallen
18:00		SFL summary		Attendance: 15,045; Referee: (Switzerland) Luca Cibelli

12 September 2021 Round 6	Servette	5–1	St. Gallen	Geneva
14:15 CEST (UTC+2)		SFL summary		Stadium: Stade de Genève; Attendance: 7,065; Referee: (Switzerland) Stefan Horisberger

22 September 2021 Round 7	St. Gallen	0–2	Basel	Kybunpark, St. Gallen
20:30	Fazliji (yellow card) 22' (yellow-red card) 81'; Görtler (yellow card) 25'	SFL summary	16', 86' Cabral; (yellow card) 34' Millar; (yellow card) 58' Ndoye; (yellow card) 77' Xhaka	Attendance: 14,321; Referee: (Switzerland) Sandro Schärer (Buttikon)

25 September 2021 Round 8	Young Boys	2–1	St. Gallen	Bern
18:00 CEST (UTC+2)	Pefok 3'; Mambimbi 47'	SFL summary	Duah 61'	Stadium: Stadion Wankdorf; Attendance: 25,166; Referee: (Switzerland) Luca Cibelli

2 October 2021 Round 9	Grasshopper Club	5–2	St. Gallen	Letzigrund, Zürich
18:00	Sène 9', 49'; Kawabe (yellow card) 14'; Léo 22'; Pusic (yellow card) 58'; Bolla 70'; Diani 84'	SFL summary	(yellow card) 28' (goal) 46' Lüchinger; 54' (pen.) Duah; (yellow card) 55' Guillemenot	Attendance: 5,789; Referee: (Switzerland) Fedayi San (Gebenstorf)

17 October 2021 Round 10	St. Gallen	2–1	Servette	Kybunpark, St. Gallen
16:30		SFL summary		Attendance: 13,945; Referee: (Switzerland) Luca Piccolo

24 October 2021 Round 11	Luzern	2–0	St. Gallen	Lucerne
14:15 CEST (UTC+2)		SFL summary		Stadium: Swissporarena; Attendance: 10,769; Referee: (Switzerland) Urs Schnyder

30 October 2021 Round 12	St. Gallen	3–1	Young Boys	St. Gallen
18:00 CET (UTC+1)	Youan 4'; Görtler (yellow card) 37'; Faivre 47' (o.g.); Diakité 75'; Besio (yellow card) 87'	Report	82' (o.g.) Stillhart; (yellow card) 90+5' Elia	Stadium: Kybunpark; Attendance: 17,901; Referee: (Switzerland) Fedayi San (Gebenstorf)

7 November 2021 Round 13	Basel	0–1	St. Gallen	St. Jakob-Park, Basel
16:30	Millar (yellow card) 46'; Burger (yellow card) 70'; Ndoye (yellow card) 76'	SFL summary FCB report	(yellow card) 24' Nuhu; (yellow card) 82' Zigi; 87' Youan	Attendance: 23,599; Referee: (Switzerland) Urs Schnyder

21 November 2021 Round 14	St. Gallen	0–1	Lausanne-Sport	Kybunpark, St. Gallen
14:15		SFL summary	12' (o.g.) Nuhu	Attendance: 15,965; Referee: (Switzerland) Lukas Fähndrich

27 November 2021 Round 15	Sion	3–1	St. Gallen	Stade Tourbillon, Sion
20:30		SFL summary		Attendance: 5,800; Referee: (Switzerland) Stefan Horisberger

5 December 2021 Round 16	St. Gallen	0–4	Grasshopper Club	Kybunpark, St. Gallen
16:30	Stillhart (red card) 18'; Guillemenot (yellow card) 81'	SFL summary	32', 43', 58' Sène; (yellow card) 82' Margreitter; 83' Kawabe	Attendance: 14,335; Referee: (Switzerland) Alessandro Dudic

11 December 2021 Round 17	St. Gallen	1–1	Lugano	Kybunpark, St. Gallen
20:30		SFL summary		Attendance: 9,800; Referee: (Switzerland) Stefan Horisberger

18 December 2021 Round 18	Zürich	3–1	St. Gallen	Letzigrund, Zürich
18:00		SFL summary		Attendance: 11,571; Referee: (Switzerland) Alessandro Dudic

===== Second half of season =====
30 January 2022 Round 19	Lausanne-Sport	1–5	St. Gallen	Stade de la Tuilière, Lausanne
14:15		SFL summary		Attendance: 3,740; Referee: (Switzerland) Luca Cibelli

6 February 2022 Round 20	St. Gallen	3–3	Young Boys	Kybunpark, St. Gallen
16:30 CET (UTC+1)		SFL summary		Attendance: 16,305; Referee: (Switzerland) Fedayi San (Gebenstorf)

12 February 2022 Round 21	St. Gallen	5–1	Servette	Kybunpark, St. Gallen
20:30 CET (UTC+1)	Ruiz 4'; Guillemenot 10'; Guillemenot 29'; Schubert 63'; Schubert 77'; Lungoyi (yellow card) 83'	SFL summary	2' Schalk; (yellow card) 66' Clichy; (yellow card) 69' Cognat	Attendance: 12,960; Referee: (Switzerland) Sandro Schärer (Buttikon)

19 February 2022 Round 22	Lugano	0–2	St. Gallen	Cornaredo, Lugano
18:00		SFL summary		Attendance: 3,313; Referee: (Switzerland) Stefan Horisberger

27 February 2022 Round 23	St. Gallen	2–0	Grasshopper Club	Kybunpark, St. Gallen
14:15	Von Moos 7'; Guillemenot (yellow card) 58'; Duah 66'; Toma (yellow card) 87'	SFL summary	(yellow card) 20' Abrashi; (yellow card) 63' Jordão; (yellow card) 90+1' Bolla	Attendance: 18,861; Referee: Stefan Horisberger

3 March 2022 Round 24	Basel	2–2	St. Gallen	St. Jakob-Park, Basel
20:30	Xhaka (yellow card) 36'; Frei (yellow card) 41'; Chalov 56'; Chalov 83'	SFL summary FCB report	20' Guillemenot; 22' Duah; (yellow card) 32' Euclides Cabral; (yellow card) 36' Guillemenot; (yellow card) 45' Ruiz; (yellow card) 90+4' Besio; (yellow card) 90+4' Jankewitz	Attendance: 19,572; Referee: (Switzerland) Fedayi San (Gebenstorf)

6 March 2022 Round 25	St. Gallen	1–1	Sion	Kybunpark, St. Gallen
16:30	Schubert 45+2'	SFL summary	53' Stojilković	Attendance: 15,605; Referee: (Switzerland) Urs Schnyder

12 March 2022 Round 26	Zürich	0–3	St. Gallen	Letzigrund, Zürich
18:00		SFL summary		Attendance: 17,288; Referee: (Switzerland) Stefan Horisberger

19 March 2022 Round 27	St. Gallen	3–2	Luzern	St. Gallen
18:00 CET (UTC+1)	Schmidt 12'; Görtler 21'; Duah 37'	SFL summary	6' Čumić; 9' Burch	Stadium: Kybunpark; Attendance: 17,848; Referee: (Switzerland) Luca Cibelli

2 April 2022 Round 28	Sion	0–3	St. Gallen	Stade Tourbillon, Sion
20:30		SFL summary	26' Ruiz; 30' Guillemenot; 59' Von Moos	Attendance: 4,800; Referee: (Switzerland) Sven Wolfensberger

10 April 2022 Round 29	St. Gallen	2–2	Basel	Kybunpark, St. Gallen
16:30	Duah 20'; Maglica (yellow card) 49'; Cabral (yellow card) 60'; Guillemenot 65'; Ruiz (yellow card) 76'	SFL summary	26' (o.g.) Stergiou; (yellow card) 60' Xhaka; (yellow card) 61' Stocker; 67' Burger; (yellow card) 70' Lang	Attendance: 18,861; Referee: (Switzerland) Urs Schnyder

19 March 2022 Round 30	Luzern	3–2	St. Gallen	Swissporarena, Luzern
18:00	Schulz 75'; Dejan Sorgić 84'; Ndiaye 90+1'	SFL summary	13' Ruiz; 83' Fazliji	Attendance: 13,491; Referee: (Switzerland) Sandro Schärer (Buttikon)

24 April 2022 Matchday 31	St. Gallen	3–0	Lugano	Kybunpark, St. Gallen
14:15	Görtler 19'; Von Moos 32'; Schubert 35'	SFL summary		Attendance: 17,048; Referee: (Switzerland) Luca Cibelli

30 April 2022 Matchday 32	Servette	0–2	St. Gallen	Stade de Genève, Geneva
20:30		SFL summary	68' Fazliji; 88' Lungoyi	Attendance: 5,394; Referee: (Switzerland) Sven Wolfensberger

7 May 2022 Matchday 33	St. Gallen	1–2	Zürich	Kybunpark, St. Gallen
20:30 CET	Jordi Quintillà 37'; Schmidt (yellow card) 77'; Stergiou (yellow card) 85'	Report	Mets 10'; Krasniqi (yellow card) 35'; Aliti (yellow card) 36'; Maglica 43' (o.g.); Kryeziu (yellow card) 64'	Attendance: 18,861; Referee: (Switzerland) Lukas Fähndrich

10 May 2022 Matchday 34	Young Boys	4–1	St. Gallen	Stadion Wankdorf, Bern
20:30 CET	Elia 7' 68'; Niasse (yellow card) 13'; Zesiger (yellow card) 55'; Kanga 61' (pen.); Fassnacht 62'; Lustenberger (yellow card) 86'	Report	Guillemenot 51'; Maglica (yellow card) 59'; Görtler (yellow card) 90+2'	Attendance: 23,152; Referee: (Switzerland) Sven Wolfensberger

19 May 2022 Matchday 35	Grasshopper	3–2	St. Gallen	Stadion Letzigrund, Zürich
20:30 CET	Loosli 18'; Morandi 45+1'; André Moreira (yellow card) 59'; Momoh 81'; Abrashi (yellow card) 87'; Sène (yellow card) 90+5'	Report	Besio (yellow card) 10'; Stillhart (yellow card) 42'; Jordi Quintillà 60' (pen.); Duah 87'	Attendance: 5,234; Referee: (Switzerland) Luca Piccolo

22 May 2022 Matchday 36	St. Gallen	4–0	Lausanne-Sport	Kybunpark, St. Gallen
16:30 CET	Duah 24' (yellow card) 32' (goal) 61'; Görtler 65'; Sutter 78'	Report	Coyle (yellow card) 52'; Alakouch (yellow card) 59'; Castella (yellow card) 66'	Attendance: 17,121; Referee: (Switzerland) Stefan Horisberger
