= 2024–25 FC St. Gallen season =

FC St. Gallen
2024–25 season
- Manager: Enrico Maaßen
- Stadium: Kybunpark
- Swiss Super League: 8th
- Swiss Cup: Third round
- UEFA Conference League: League phase
- Highest home attendance: 18,720 vs Young Boys
- Lowest home attendance: 11,300 vs Tobol
- Biggest win: St. Gallen 4–0 Young Boys
Home colours	Away colours

The 2024–25 season was the 146th season in the history of FC St. Gallen, and the club's 13th consecutive season in the Swiss Super League. In addition to the domestic league, the club participated in the Swiss Cup and the UEFA Conference League.

== Transfers ==
=== In ===
Pos.	Player	Transferred from	Fee	Date	Source
DF	(Ghana) Stephan Ambrosius	(Germany) Hamburger SV	Free	1 July 2024	
FW	(Guinea) Moustapha Cissé	(Italy) Atalanta BC U23	Loan	25 July 2024	

=== Out ===
Pos.	Player	Transferred to	Fee	Date	Source
DF	(Switzerland) Leonidas Stergiou	(Germany) VfB Stuttgart	€2,000,000	1 July 2024	
MF	(Netherlands) Richard van der Venne	(Netherlands) RKC Waalwijk	Contract termination	1 July 2024	

== Friendlies ==
=== Pre-season ===
22 June 2024 Friendly	FC Kreuzlingen (Switzerland)	0–9	(Switzerland) St. Gallen	Kreuzlingen
13:00		Report	Konietzke 12', 46'; Parente 21'; Ortancioglu 24' (o.g.); Lymann 57', 73'; Stevanović 66'; Ruiz 76', 80'	Stadium: Bemix Arena (Sportplatz Hafenareal); Attendance: 1,501; Referee: Hajrim Qovanaj

26 June 2024 Friendly	St. Gallen (Switzerland)	0–2	(Bulgaria) Ludogorets Razgrad	Zams, Austria
18:00			Chochev 36'; Tekpetey 62'	Stadium: Eurogast-Grissemann-Arena Zams

30 June 2024 Friendly	Universitatea Craiova (Romania)	1–2	(Switzerland) St. Gallen	Kematen
17:00	Mitriță 11'		Geubbels 14'; Neziri 52'	Stadium: Sportplatz Kematen

6 July 2024 Friendly	FC Rapperswil-Jona (Switzerland)	3–1	(Switzerland) St. Gallen	Rapperswil-Jona
14:00	Ribeiro 29'; Schmidt 37' (pen.); Volkart 42'	Report	Mambimbi 76'	Stadium: Sportanlage Grünfeld; Attendance: 721; Referee: Tobias Thies

13 July 2024 Friendly	Vaduz (Liechtenstein)	0–1	(Switzerland) St. Gallen	Vaduz, Liechtenstein
14:00		Report	Witzig 54'	Stadium: Rheinpark Stadion; Attendance: 1,568; Referee: Hüseyin Sanli

14 July 2024 Friendly	St. Gallen (Switzerland)	v	(Germany) 1. FC Kaiserslautern
13:00

== Competitions ==
=== Overall record ===
Competition	First match	Last match	Starting round	Record							
Competition	First match	Last match	Starting round	Pld	W	D	L	GF	GA	GD	Win %
Swiss Super League	20 July 2024	22–24 May 2025	Matchday 1	4	3	0	1	9	4	+5	75.00
Swiss Cup	18 August 2024		First round	0	0	0	0	0	0	+0	—
UEFA Conference League	25 July 2024		Second qualifying round	4	3	0	1	9	4	+5	75.00
Total				8	6	0	2	18	8	+10	75.00

Last updated: 15 August 2024
Source: Soccerway

=== Swiss Super League ===
==== League table ====
Pos	Team	Pld	W	D	L	GF	GA	GD	Pts	Qualification or relegation (Note: Teams play each other three times (33 matches), before the league is split into two groups (the top six and the bottom six).)
6	Luzern	38	14	10	14	66	64	+2	52	
7	Zürich	38	15	8	15	56	57	−1	53	
8	St. Gallen	38	13	13	12	52	53	−1	52	
9	Sion	38	11	11	16	47	57	−10	44	
10	Winterthur	38	11	7	20	43	68	−25	40	

Source: Swiss Super League
Rules for classification: 1) Points; 2) Goal difference; 3) Goals scored; 4) Head-to-head goal difference; 5) Head-to-head goals scored 6) Away goals scored; 7) Draw.

==== Results summary ====
Overall								Home						Away					
Pld	W	D	L	GF	GA	GD	Pts	W	D	L	GF	GA	GD	W	D	L	GF	GA	GD
4	3	0	1	9	4	+5	9	2	0	0	5	0	+5	1	0	1	4	4	0

Last updated: 11 August 2024.

==== Results by round ====
Round	1	2	3	4
Ground	A	H	A	H
Result	L	W	W	W
Position				

Updated to match(es) played on 11 August 2024. Source:
A = Away; H = Home; W = Win; D = Draw; L = Loss

==== Matches ====
The match schedule was released on 18 June 2024.

20 July 2024 1	Winterthur	1–0	St. Gallen	Winterthur
20:30	Rohner (yellow card) 25'; Di Giusto 70'		Görtler (yellow card) 76'; Quintillà (yellow card) 89'	Stadium: Schützenwiese; Referee: Sven Wolfensberger

28 July 2024 2	St. Gallen	4–0	Young Boys	St. Gallen
16:30	Chadrac Akolo 9'; Geubbels 18'; Mambimbi 51'; Witzig 55'		Maleš (yellow card) 81'	Stadium: Kybunpark; Attendance: 18,720; Referee: Urs Schnyder

3 August 2024 3	Lausanne-Sport	3–4	St. Gallen	Lausanne
14:15	Okoroji 37' (o.g.); Dussenne 77'; Diabaté 80'		Schmidt 1'; Geubbels 20' (pen.); Akolo 50'; Cissé 70'	Stadium: Stade de la Tuilière; Attendance: 6,024; Referee: Nico Gianforte

11 August 2024 4	St. Gallen	1–0	Grasshopper	St. Gallen
14:15				Stadium: Kybunpark

=== Swiss Cup ===
18 August 2024 First round	AC Malcantone	v	St. Gallen	TBD
16:30

=== UEFA Conference League ===
==== Second qualifying round ====
The draw was held on 19 June 2024.

25 July 2024 First leg	St. Gallen (Switzerland)	4–1	(Kazakhstan) Tobol	St. Gallen
20:00	Stevanovic 35'; Akolo 39'; Toma 77'; Quintillà (yellow card) 89'; Vallci 90+7'	Report	Mosiashvili (yellow card) 18'; Vallci 28' (o.g.); Asrankulov (yellow card) 45+3'; Essien (yellow card) 63'; El Messaoudi (yellow card) 81'; Chesnokov (yellow card) 85'; Rui Costa (yellow card) 89'	Stadium: Kybunpark; Attendance: 11,300; Referee: Rob Harvey (Republic of Ireland)

1 August 2024 Second leg	Tobol (Kazakhstan)	0–1 (1–5 agg.)	(Switzerland) St. Gallen	Kostanay, Kazakhstan
21:00 UTC+5	Essien (yellow card) 58' (yellow-red card) 68'; Galym (red card) 90'	Report	Cissé 73'	Stadium: Kostanay Central Stadium; Attendance: 5,842; Referee: Joni Hyytiä (Finland)

==== Third qualifying round ====
The draw was held on 22 July 2024.

7 August 2024 First leg	St. Gallen (Switzerland)	2–0	(Poland) Śląsk Wrocław	St. Gallen, Switzerland
	Akolo 5'; Geubbels 40'	Report		Stadium: Kybunpark; Referee: Jan Petrik (Czech Republic)

15 August 2024 Second leg	Śląsk Wrocław (Poland)	3–2 (3–4 agg.)	(Switzerland) St. Gallen	Wrocław
20:30		Report		Stadium: Wrocław Stadium

==== Play-off round ====
22 August 2024 First leg	St. Gallen (Switzerland)	v	(Turkey) Trabzonspor	St. Gallen, Switzerland
				Stadium: Kybunpark

29 August 2024 Second leg	Trabzonspor (Turkey)	v	(Switzerland) St. Gallen	Trabzon
				Stadium: Papara Park
