= Diego Besio =

Swiss footballer (born 2006)

Personal information
- Date of birth: 23 June 2006 (age 20)
- Height: 1.87 m (6 ft 2 in)
- Position: Forward

Team information
- Current team: St. Gallen
- Number: 31

Youth career
- FC Gossau
- 2011–: FC St. Gallen

Senior career*
Years	Team	Apps	(Gls)
2023–2024	FC Gossau	12	(0)
2024–2026	FC St. Gallen II	17	(2)
2025–	FC St. Gallen	29	(2)

International career^{‡}
2026–	Switzerland U20	2	(0)
- * Club domestic league appearances and goals as of 28 September 2026 ‡ National team caps and goals as of 14 August 2026

Diego Besio (born 23 June 2006) is a Swiss footballer who plays as a forward for FC St. Gallen.

== Career ==
He started his youth career in FC Gossau at the age of 5. At the time, the team also included Cheveyo Tsawa and was coached by Dorjee Tsawa. Diego Besio progressed to the academy of FC St. Gallen, but later returned to Gossau where he made his senior debut. Finally, he signed for the senior team of St. Gallen and made his professional debut.

In European competition, he scored against Sheriff Tiraspol in the 2026–27 UEFA Conference League qualifying.

== Personal life ==
He is a son of Claudio Besio and brother of Alessio Besio, both footballers as well.
