= Lukas Watkowiak =

German footballer (born 1996)

Personal information
- Date of birth: 6 March 1996 (age 30)
- Place of birth: Germany
- Height: 1.97 m (6 ft 6 in)
- Position: Goalkeeper

Team information
- Current team: St. Gallen
- Number: 25

Youth career
- –2012: FSV Frankfurt
- 2012–2015: Mainz 05

Senior career*
Years	Team	Apps	(Gls)
2015–2017	Mainz 05 II	17	(0)
2017	Mainz 05	0	(0)
2017–2020	SV Wehen Wiesbaden	13	(0)
2020–	St. Gallen	11	(0)
- * Club domestic league appearances and goals as of 28 September 2026

Lukas Watkowiak (born 6 March 1996) is a German professional footballer who plays as a goalkeeper for Swiss club St. Gallen.

== Club career ==
On 20 August 2020, he signed a two-year contract with the Swiss club St. Gallen.

== Career statistics ==
=== Club ===
As of match played 4 February 2026

Appearances and goals by club, season and competition
Club	Season	League			National cup (Note: Includes DFB Pokal and Swiss Cup)		Other		Total	
Club	Season	Division	Apps	Goals	Apps	Goals	Apps	Goals	Apps	Goals
Mainz 05 II	2016–17	3. Liga	17	0	—		—		17	0
Mainz 05	2016–17	Bundesliga	0	0	0	0	0	0	0	0
SV Wehen Wiesbaden	2017–18	3. Liga	1	0	—		—		1	0
SV Wehen Wiesbaden	2018–19	3. Liga	1	0	0	0	0	0	1	0
SV Wehen Wiesbaden	2019–20	2. Bundesliga	11	0	1	0	—		12	0
SV Wehen Wiesbaden	Total		13	0	1	0	0	0	14	0
St. Gallen	2020–21	Swiss Super League	1	0	1	0	0	0	2	0
St. Gallen	2021–22	Swiss Super League	0	0	5	0	—		5	0
St. Gallen	2022–23	Swiss Super League	4	0	3	0	—		7	0
St. Gallen	2023–24	Swiss Super League	2	0	1	0	—		3	0
St. Gallen	2024–25	Swiss Super League	0	0	0	0	0	0	0	0
St. Gallen	2025–26	Swiss Super League	3	0	3	0	—		6	0
St. Gallen	Total		10	0	13	0	0	0	23	0
Career total			40	0	14	0	0	0	54	0
