= Lawrence Ati-Zigi =

Ghanaian footballer (born 1996)

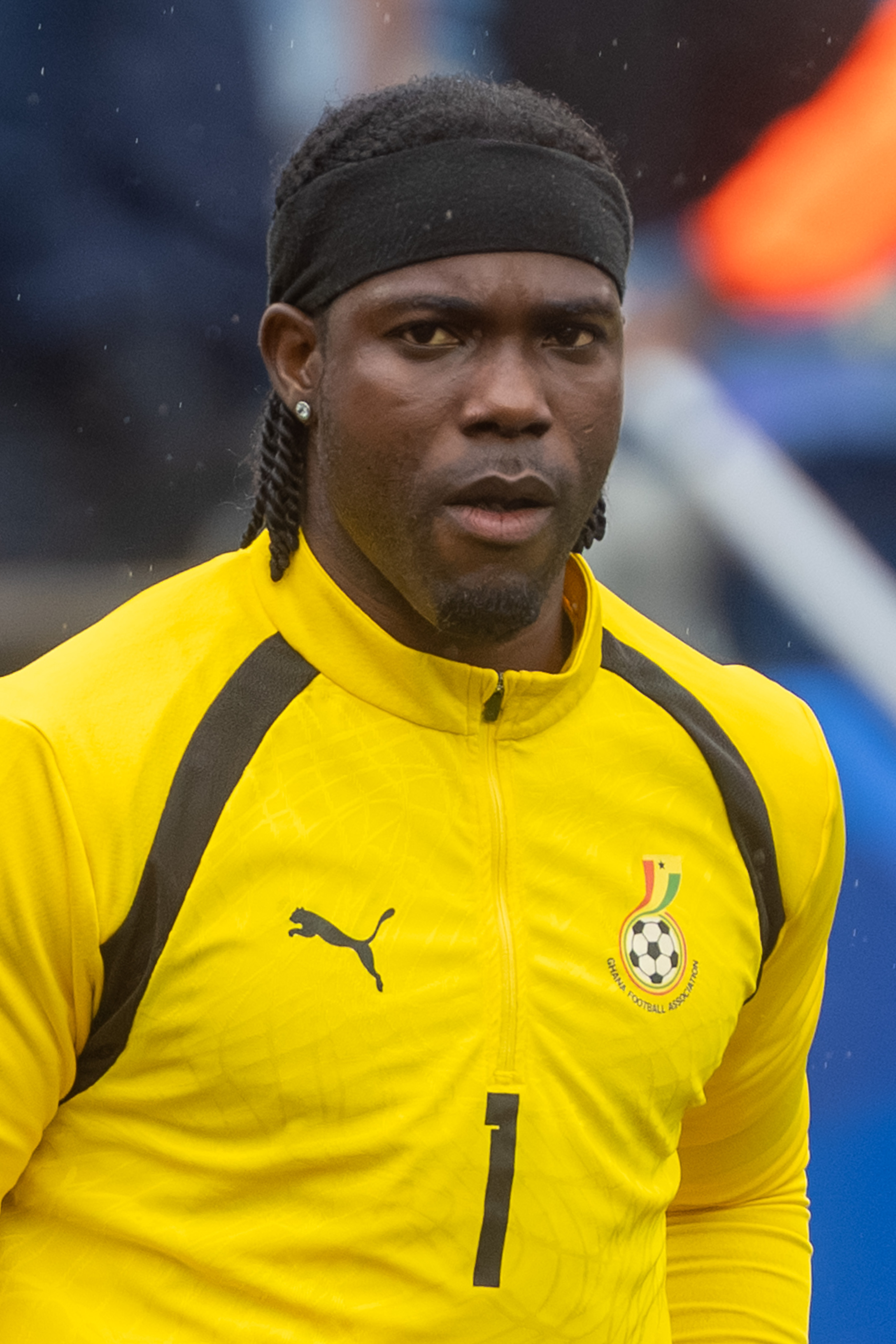
- Ati-Zigi with Ghana in 2026

Personal information
- Full name: Lawrence Ati-Zigi
- Date of birth: 29 November 1996 (age 29)
- Place of birth: Tamale, Ghana
- Height: 1.88 m (6 ft 2 in)
- Position: Goalkeeper

Team information
- Current team: St. Gallen
- Number: 1

Youth career
- –2015: Red Bull Ghana

Senior career*
Years	Team	Apps	(Gls)
2015–2017	Red Bull Salzburg	0	(0)
2015–2017	→ FC Liefering (loan)	33	(0)
2017–2020	Sochaux	23	(0)
2020–	St. Gallen	240	(0)

International career^{‡}
2015	Ghana U-20	4	(0)
2018–	Ghana	31	(0)
- * Club domestic league appearances and goals as of 28 September 2026 ‡ National team caps and goals as of 4 July 2026

Lawrence Ati-Zigi (born 29 November 1996) is a Ghanaian professional footballer who plays as a goalkeeper for Swiss Super League club St. Gallen and the Ghana national team.

Ati-Zigi has represented Ghana at under-17 and under-20 levels. He has been to two African Cup of Nations (2019 and 2021) but featured in none. He made his debut for the Ghana national team in June 2018 in a friendly against Iceland. He was the starting goalkeeper in Ghana's 2022 FIFA World Cup campaign.

== Club career ==
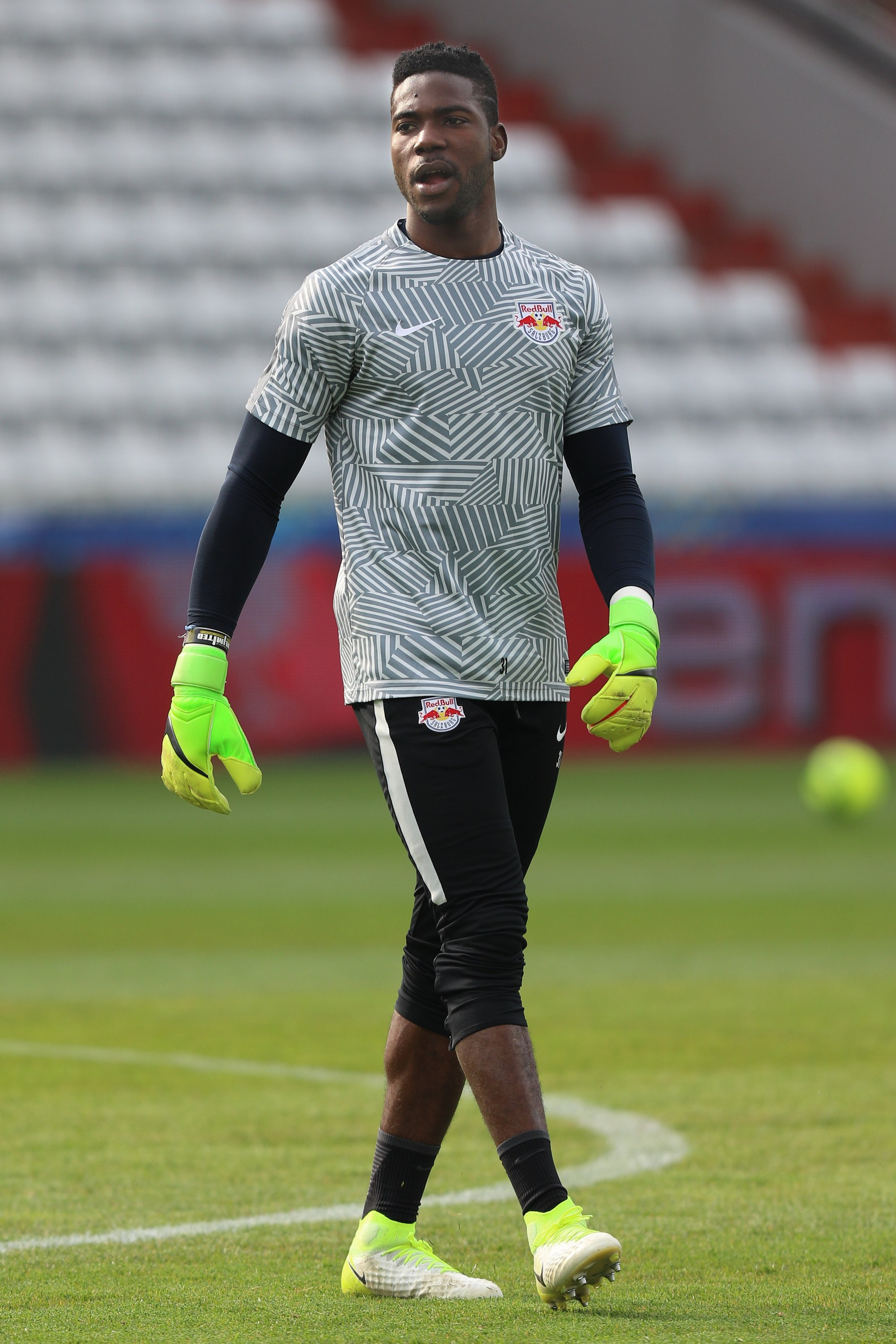
Ati-Zigi playing for Red Bull Salzburg in 2017

=== Liefering ===
In January 2015, Ati-Zigi joined Red Bull Salzburg from Ghanaian feeder club Red Bull Ghana. Ati-Zigi was immediately loaned out to reserve team FC Liefering who play in the Austria 2. Liga. He joined other Ghanaian players including David Atanga and Raphael Dwamena. Ati-Zigi made his league debut for Liefering on 17 April 2015, when his club beat TSV Hartberg 4–1 at Untersberg-Arena. After his debut, he went ahead to play in six consecutive league matches. At the end of his first season, he played six league matches with Liefering finishing in second place in the 2014–15 Austrian Football First League.

The following season, he featured in 16 out of 36 games as the club finished in fourth place in the 2015–16 Austrian Football First League. He also made the Red Bull Salzburg match day squad twice, due to that earned a medal as Salzburg won the 2015–16 Austrian Football Bundesliga. In his final season with Liefering, he played in 11 games to help the club secure a second-place finish in the 2016–17 Austrian Football First League. In total he featured in 33 matches for Liefering in this two-year stint.

=== Sochaux ===
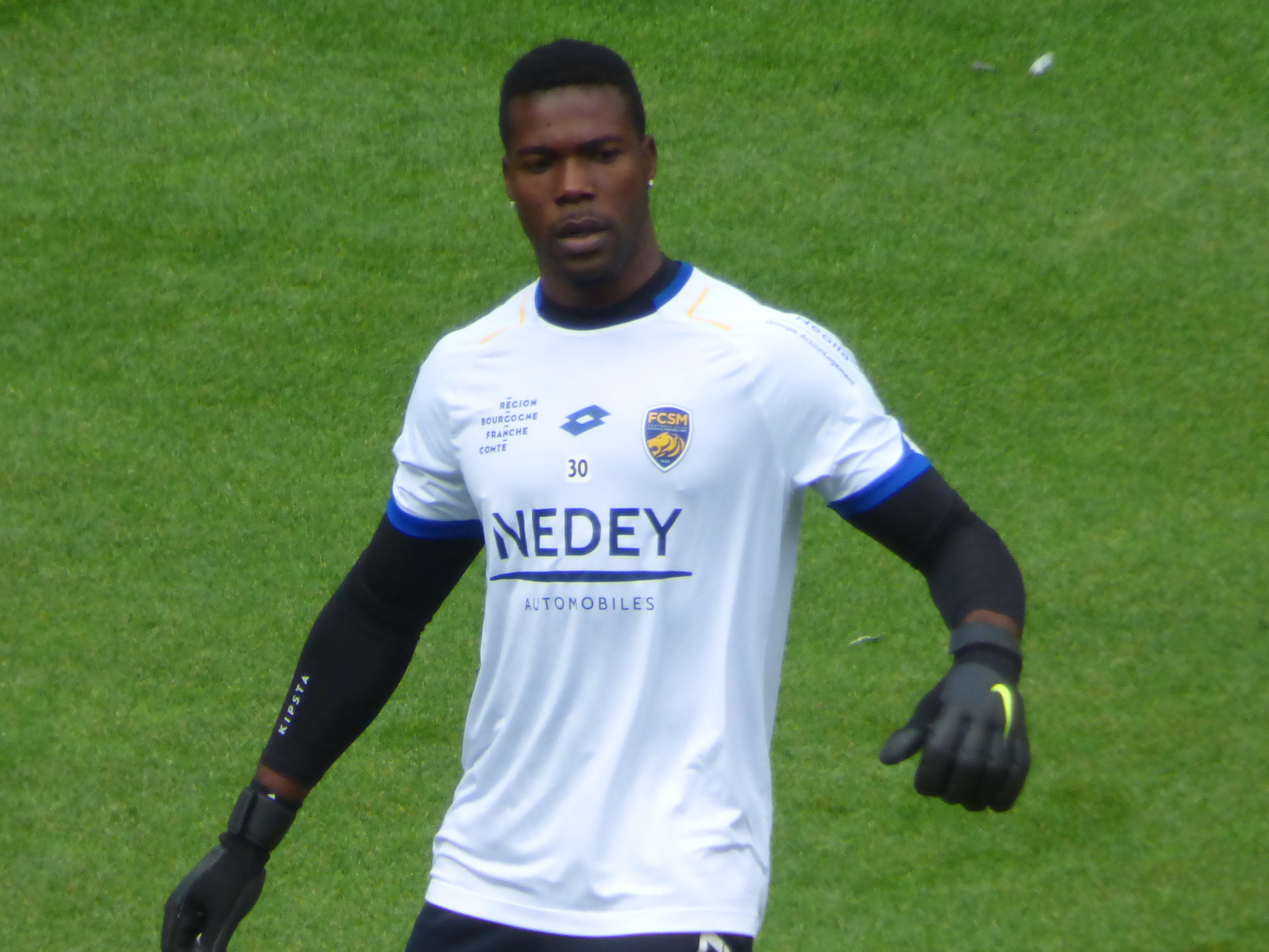
Ati-Zigi playing for Sochaux in 2018

In July 2017, Ati-Zigi joined French team FC Sochaux-Montbéliard on a three-year deal reuniting with his former coach Peter Zeidler from Liefering and Red Bull Salzburg. He made his club debut in the first round of the in a Coupe de la Ligue on 8 August 2017 against Valenciennes which ended in a 3–1 loss.

Over the season, he remained as the second choice goalkeeper behind Maxence Prévot being named in the match day squad for the 24 consecutive times. On 9 February 2019, seven months after signing for the club, he made his Ligue 2 debut against Stade de Reims after coming on as a substitute in the 58th minute for Prévot who sustained an injury; Ati-Zigi conceded two goals as Souchaux lost 3–0. Afterwards he kept the post for the next five league matches, keeping a clean sheet in one. At the end of his first season with Montbéliard side he had made 12 appearances. Out of the 12 appearances, four of those were in Coupe de France, for which he was the main goalkeeper. He helped the club to reach the round of 16 after three victories in the early stages, including saving a penalty in their 5–4 penalty shootout in the first round against FC Saint-Louis Neuweg and keeping a clean sheet in their round of 32 match against Ligue 1 side Amiens which ended in 6–0. They were eliminated in the round of 16, after losing to defending champions PSG by 4–1.

In the 2018–19 season, Ati-Zigi remained the second choice goalkeeper behind Prévot. He played his first league match of the season on 22 December 2018, keeping a clean sheet in their 1–0 over Lorient.

=== St. Gallen ===
On 16 January 2020, Ati-Zigi joined Swiss-club FC St. Gallen on a two and half-year deal with his contract set to expire in June 2023. Ati-Zigi made his debut for the club against FC Lugano in a Swiss Super League match on 26 January, helping the club to a 3–1 victory.

On 26 October 2020, in a league match against Lugano, Ati-Zigi was subjected to intense racist chants from the opponent's fan base. After the match, Lugano issued a statement and apology via social media to St. Gallen and Ati-Zigi stating – “We would like to apologize to FC St. Gallen and the player. There must be no place for racism. The club will do its best to find those responsible."

On 14 September 2022, St. Gallen announced that Ati-Zigi had signed a new two-year contract that will keep him at the Swiss club until 2025. On 25 October 2022, Ati-Zigi played his 100th Swiss Super League match, in a 1–1 draw against Servette. Prior to that he had played his 100th match in all competitions against Sion on 10 September.

== International career ==
Ati-Zigi was a member of the Ghana national under-17 team in 2013 and he played for the team in the 2013 African U-17 Championship. In 2015, he was promoted to the Ghana under-20 side. He earned a place in the final squad for the 2015 FIFA U-20 World Cup. He started in all four games as Ghana was eliminated by Mali in the round of 16.

On 23 August 2017, Ati-Zigi received his first call-up to the Ghana senior national team for the 2018 FIFA World Cup qualification games against Congo on 1 and 5 September 2017. On 7 June 2018, Ati-Zigi made his senior national team debut for Ghana, starting and playing 90 minutes in a friendly match against Iceland that ended in a 2–2 draw.

Ati-Zigi was part of the Ghanaian team in the 2021 Africa Cup of Nations that was eliminated at the group stage of the competition.

On 14 November 2022, Ati-Zigi was named in the 26-man squad for the 2022 FIFA World Cup. Following injuries to Ghana's first and second choice goalkeepers, Joe Wollacott and Richard Ofori, with both missing out on the competition, he was set to be the first choice goalkeeper for the Black Stars. On 17 November, he manned the post for the Black Stars and kept a clean sheet in their 2–0 pre-world cup friendly match against Switzerland. The start was his first start in over a year.

On 24 November 2022, he made his World Cup debut and started in Ghana's opening group match of World Cup against Portugal which ended in a 3–2 loss to Ghana. In the second group game against South Korea, Ati-Zigi played the full time of the match and made several crucial saves which secured Ghana's first win at the 2022 World Cup by winning 3–2. His performance earned him positive reviews, ratings and commendations from football fans across the world.

On June 2, 2026, Ati-Zigi was selected in Ghana's squad of 26 players for the 2026 FIFA World Cup. He started in Ghana's opening match against Panama, but was substituted at half time with an injury following a collision on the pitch, with the game finishing 1–0 to Ghana. He next featured for his nation during the round of 32 match against Colombia, with Ghana losing 1–0 to end their campaign.

== Career statistics ==
=== Club ===
As of match played 27 August 2026

Appearances and goals by club, season and competition
Club	Season	League			National cup		League cup		Europe		Other		Total	
Club	Season	Division	Apps	Goals	Apps	Goals	Apps	Goals	Apps	Goals	Apps	Goals	Apps	Goals
Red Bull Salzburg	2015–16	Austrian Bundesliga	0	0	0	0	—		0	0	—		0	0
FC Liefering (loan)	2014–15	Austrian Football First League	6	0	—		—		—		—		6	0
FC Liefering (loan)	2015–16	Austrian Football First League	16	0	—		—		—		—		16	0
FC Liefering (loan)	2016–17	Austrian Football First League	11	0	—		—		—		—		11	0
FC Liefering (loan)	Total		33	0	—		—		—		—		33	0
Sochaux	2017–18	Ligue 2	7	0	4	0	1	0	—		—		12	0
Sochaux	2018–19	Ligue 2	9	0	2	0	1	0	—		—		12	0
Sochaux	2019–20	Ligue 2	7	0	1	0	1	0	—		—		9	0
Sochaux	Total		23	0	7	0	3	0	—		—		33	0
St. Gallen	2019–20	Swiss Super League	18	0	—		—		—		—		18	0
St. Gallen	2020–21	Swiss Super League	35	0	4	0	—		—		—		39	0
St. Gallen	2021–22	Swiss Super League	36	0	0	0	—		—		—		36	0
St. Gallen	2022–23	Swiss Super League	33	0	0	0	—		—		—		33	0
St. Gallen	2023–24	Swiss Super League	37	0	0	0	—		—		—		37	0
St. Gallen	2024–25	Swiss Super League	38	0	2	0	—		12 (Note: Appearance(s) in UEFA Conference League)	0	—		52	0
St. Gallen	2025–26	Swiss Super League	35	0	2	0	—		—		—		37	0
St. Gallen	2026–27	Swiss Super League	2	0	0	0	—		4 (Note: One appearance in UEFA Europa League, three appearances in UEFA Conference League)	0	—		6	0
St. Gallen	Total		234	0	8	0	—		16	0	—		258	0
Career total			290	0	15	0	3	0	16	0	0	0	324	0

=== International ===
As of match played 3 July 2026

Appearances and goals by national team and year
National team	Year	Apps	Goals
Ghana	2017	1	0
Ghana	2018	1	0
Ghana	2019	2	0
Ghana	2020	1	0
Ghana	2021	2	0
Ghana	2022	7	0
Ghana	2023	5	0
Ghana	2024	8	0
Ghana	2025	1	0
Ghana	2026	3	0
Total		31	0

== Honours ==
Red Bull Salzburg

- Austrian Bundesliga: 2015–16

St. Gallen

- Swiss Cup: 2025–26, runners-up: 2020–21, 2021–22

Individual

- Swiss Super League Player of the Month: November 2022
- Swiss Super League Best Player First Half of the season: 2022–23
- Swiss Super League Team of the Season: 2022–23
