= Ricardo Alves =

Ricardo Alves may refer to:

- Ricardo Alves (footballer, born 1991), Portuguese football defender
- Ricardo Alves (footballer, born 1993), Portuguese football midfielder
- Ricardo Alves (Paralympian), gold-medal winning member of the national football 5-a-side team for Brazil at the 2008 Summer Paralympics
- Ricardo Alves (athlete), Portuguese track and field champion at the 100m sprint
- Ricardo Azevedo (footballer) (born 2001, full name Ricardo Azevedo Alves), Swiss football midfielder
