= Claudio Besio =

Swiss footballer (born 1970)

Personal information
- Date of birth: 13 October 1970 (age 56)
- Position: Midfielder

Senior career*
Years	Team	Apps	(Gls)
1990–1993	FC St. Gallen	52	(6)
1993–1998	FC Wil 1900		
- * Club domestic league appearances and goals

Claudio Besio (born 13 October 1970) is a Swiss former professional footballer who played as a midfielder. (Note: Claudio Besio at WorldFootball.net)

He has two sons Alessio Besio and Diego Besio who are both footballers as well.
