= Albert Vallçi =

Austrian footballer (born 1995)

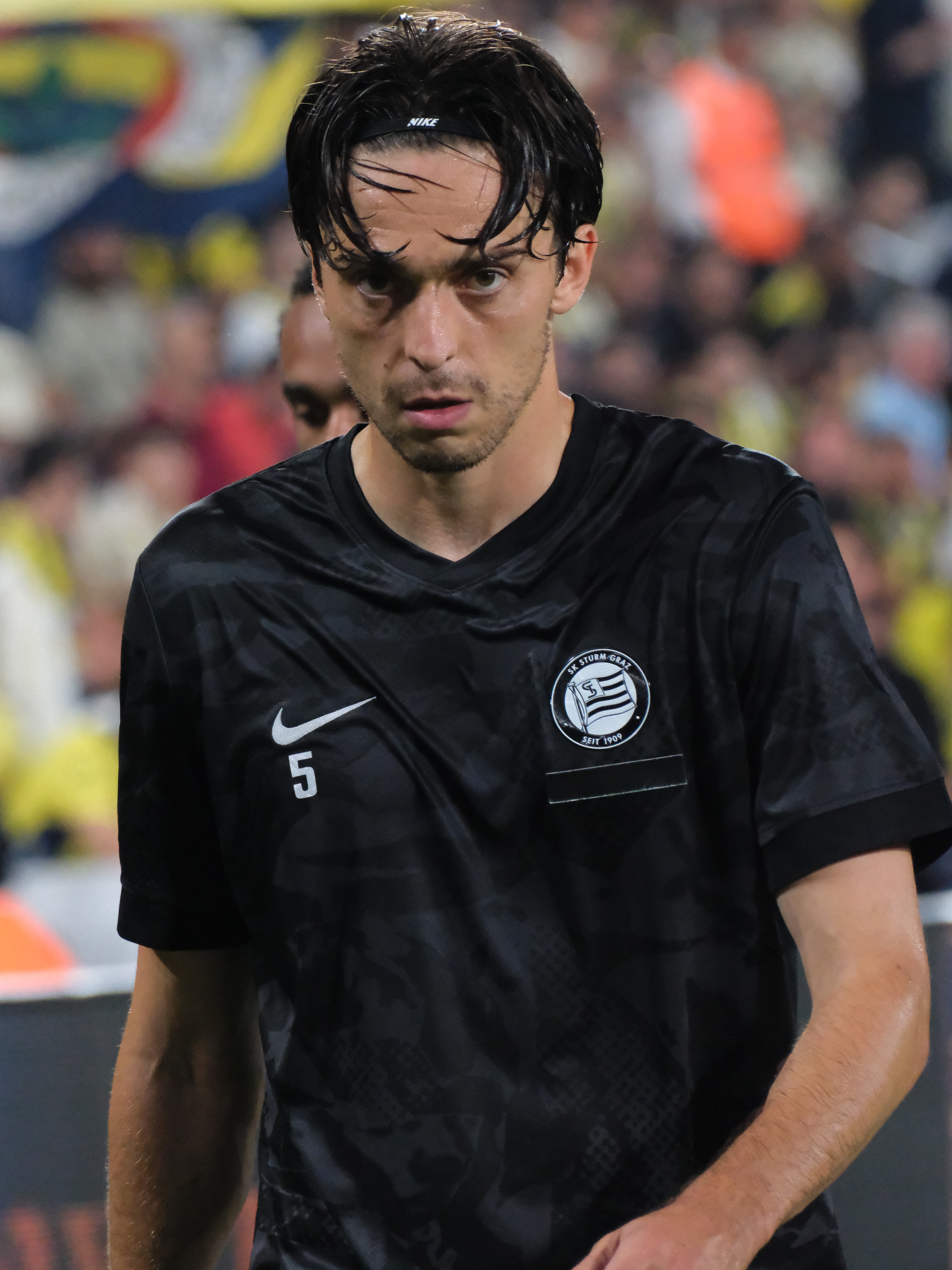
- Vallçi with Sturm Graz in August 2026

Personal information
- Date of birth: 2 July 1995 (age 31)
- Place of birth: Voitsberg, Austria
- Height: 1.91 m (6 ft 3 in)
- Position: Right-back

Team information
- Current team: Sturm Graz
- Number: 5

Youth career
- 2001–2009: FC Lankowitz
- 2009–2013: Kapfenberger SV

Senior career*
Years	Team	Apps	(Gls)
2013–2015	Kapfenberger SV II	34	(4)
2014–2015	Kapfenberger SV	7	(0)
2015–2016	SV Lafnitz	37	(1)
2016–2017	SV Horn	32	(4)
2017–2019	Wacker Innsbruck	49	(3)
2019–2022	Red Bull Salzburg	45	(4)
2022–2026	St. Gallen	96	(7)
2026–	Sturm Graz	21	(2)
- * Club domestic league appearances and goals as of 18 October 2026 ‡ National team caps and goals as of 28 May 2019

Albert Vallçi (born 2 July 1995) is an Austrian professional footballer who plays as a centre-back for Austrian Football Bundesliga club Sturm Graz.

== Club career ==
=== Early career ===
Vallçi at the age of 6, he started playing football in FC Lankowitz, where after eight years it was transferred to Kapfenberger SV. On 9 March 2013, he made his debut with Kapfenberger SV II in Matchday 16 of Austrian Regionalliga Central against Villacher SV after coming on as a substitute at 63rd minute in place of Michael Vollmann. After one year, Vallçi made his debut on 13 May as professional footballer in a 1–0 away defeat against Liefering after being named in the starting line-up. In January 2015, he joined Austrian Regionalliga Central side SV Lafnitz.

=== SV Horn ===
On 10 June 2016, Vallçi signed a two-year contract with Austrian Second League club SV Horn. On 16 July 2016, he made his debut with SV Horn in the 2016–17 Austrian Cup first round against FCM Traiskirchen after coming on as a substitute at 62nd minute in place of Milan Bortel.

=== Wacker Innsbruck ===
On 2 June 2017, Vallçi signed a one-year contract with Austrian Second League club Wacker Innsbruck. On 19 September 2017, he made his debut with Wacker Innsbruck in the 2017–18 Austrian Cup second round against SKU Amstetten after being named in the starting line-up.

=== Red Bull Salzburg ===
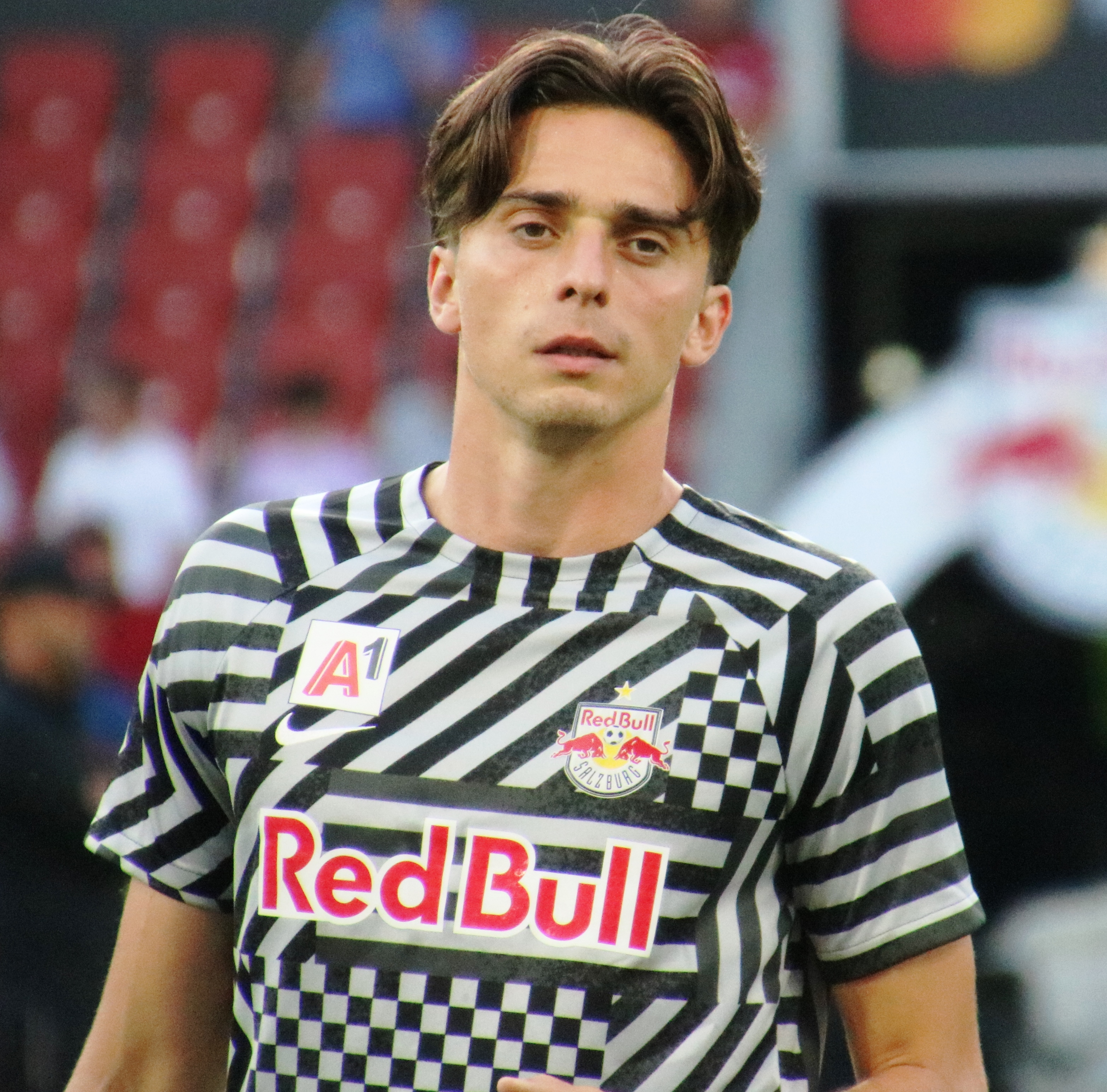
Vallçi with Red Bull Salzburg in July 2022

On 18 January 2019, Vallçi signed a three-year contract with Austrian Bundesliga club Red Bull Salzburg. On 21 February 2019, he made his debut with Red Bull Salzburg in the 2018–19 UEFA Europa League round of 32 against the Belgian side Club Brugge after coming on as a substitute at 77th minute in place of injured Marin Pongračić.

=== St. Gallen ===
On 4 August 2022, Vallçi signed a three-year contract with Swiss Super League club St. Gallen and received the squad number 20. Two days later, he was named as a St. Gallen substitute for the first time in a league match against Grasshoppers.

=== Sturm Graz ===
On 6 February 2026, Vallçi signed a contract with Austrian Football Bundesliga club Sturm Graz and received the squad number 5.

== International career ==
On 28 May 2019, Vallçi received a call-up from Austria for the UEFA Euro 2020 qualifying matches against Slovenia and North Macedonia, he was an unused substitute in these matches. In addition to Austria, he has the right to represent his father's homeland, Kosovo and his mother's homeland, Romania at the international level.

== Personal life ==
Vallçi was born in Voitsberg, Austria by Kosovo Albanian father from Mitrovica, and a Romanian mother.

== Career statistics ==
=== Club ===
As of match played 22 October 2026

Appearances and goals by club, season and competition
Club	Season	League			Cup		Continental		Total	
Club	Season	Division	Apps	Goals	Apps	Goals	Apps	Goals	Apps	Goals
Kapfenberger SV II	2012–13	Austrian Regionalliga Central	1	0	0	0	—		1	0
Kapfenberger SV II	2013–14	Austrian Regionalliga Central	24	3	0	0	—		24	3
Kapfenberger SV II	2014–15	Landesliga Steiermark	9	1	0	0	—		9	1
Kapfenberger SV II	Total		34	4	0	0	—		34	4
Kapfenberger SV	2013–14	Austrian First League	2	0	0	0	—		2	0
Kapfenberger SV	2014–15	Austrian First League	5	0	1	0	—		6	0
Kapfenberger SV	Total		7	0	1	0	—		8	0
SV Lafnitz	2014–15	Austrian Regionalliga Central	12	0	0	0	—		12	0
SV Lafnitz	2015–16	Austrian Regionalliga Central	25	1	0	0	—		25	1
SV Lafnitz	Total		37	1	0	0	—		37	1
SV Horn	2016–17	Austrian First League	32	4	2	0	—		34	4
Wacker Innsbruck	2017–18	Austrian First League	33	3	2	0	—		35	3
Wacker Innsbruck	2018–19	Austrian Bundesliga	16	0	3	2	—		19	2
Wacker Innsbruck	Total		49	3	5	2	—		54	5
Red Bull Salzburg	2018–19	Austrian Bundesliga	10	1	1	0	1 (Note: Appearance in UEFA Europa League)	0	12	1
Red Bull Salzburg	2019–20	Austrian Bundesliga	18	2	3	0	2 (Note: One appearance in UEFA Champions League, one appearance in UEFA Europa League)	0	23	2
Red Bull Salzburg	2020–21	Austrian Bundesliga	17	1	5	1	4 (Note: Two appearances in UEFA Champions League, two appearances in UEFA Europa League)	0	26	2
Red Bull Salzburg	2021–22	Austrian Bundesliga	0	0	0	0	—		0	0
Red Bull Salzburg	Total		45	4	9	1	7	0	61	5
St. Gallen	2022–23	Swiss Super League	22	0	1	1	—		23	1
St. Gallen	2023–24	Swiss Super League	36	5	2	0	—		38	5
St. Gallen	2024–25	Swiss Super League	27	2	3	1	9 (Note: Appearances in UEFA Conference League)	1	39	4
St. Gallen	2025–26	Swiss Super League	11	0	3	0	—		14	0
St. Gallen	Total		96	7	9	2	9	1	114	10
Sturm Graz	2025–26	Austrian Bundesliga	14	2	—		—		14	2
Sturm Graz	2026–27	Austrian Bundesliga	7	0	0	0	6 (Note: Three appearances in UEFA Champions League, three appearances in UEFA Europa League)	0	13	0
Sturm Graz	Total		21	2	0	0	6	0	27	2
Career total			321	25	26	5	22	1	369	31

== Honours ==
Red Bull Salzburg

- Austrian Champion: 2019, 2020, 2021, 2022
- Austrian Cup: 2019, 2020, 2021
