= Willem Geubbels =

French association football player (born 2001)

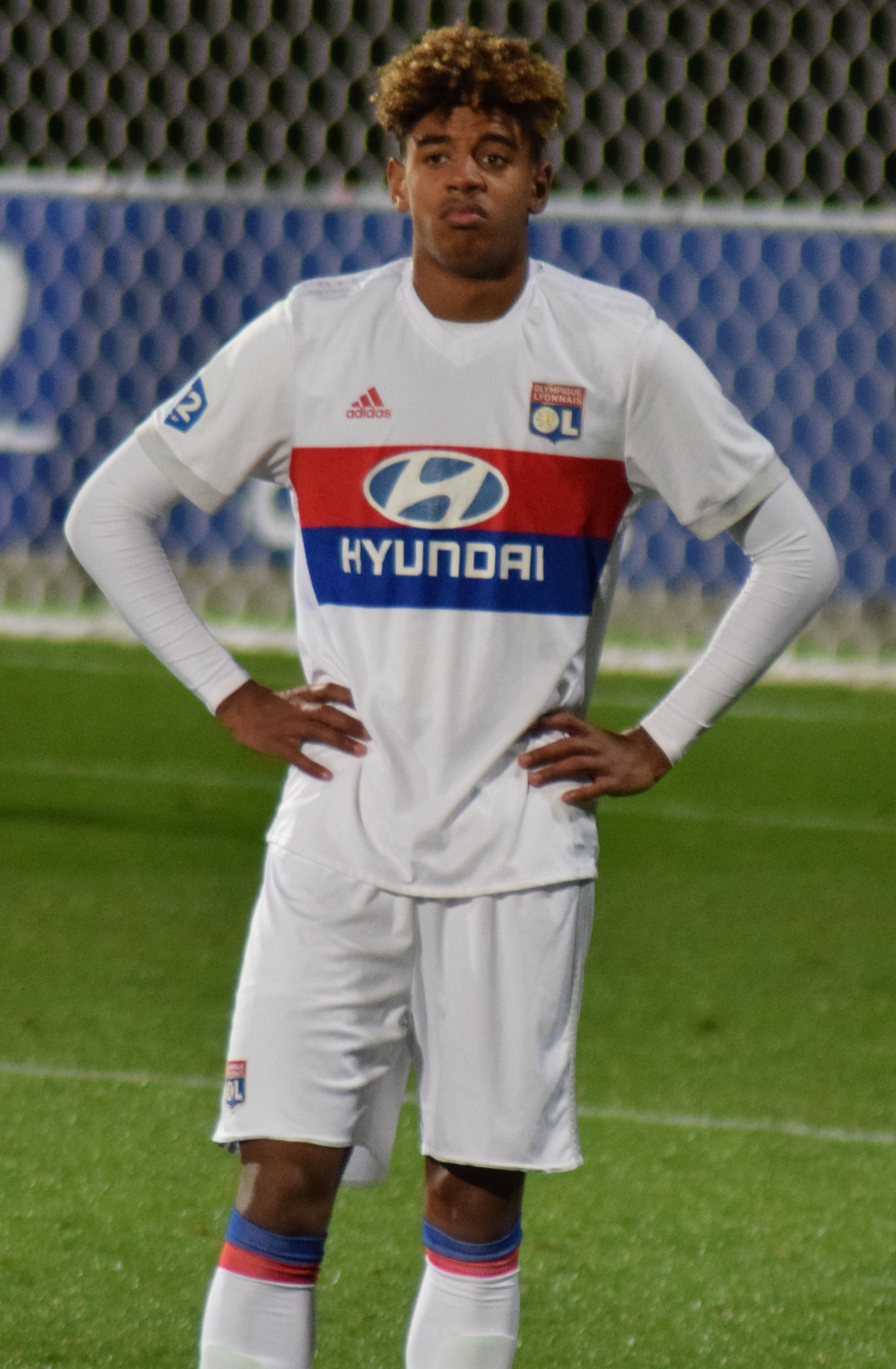
- Geubbels with Lyon B in 2017

Personal information
- Full name: Willem Davnis Louis Didier Geubbels
- Date of birth: 16 August 2001 (age 25)
- Place of birth: Villeurbanne, France
- Height: 1.87 m (6 ft 2 in)
- Position: Forward

Team information
- Current team: Lecce
- Number: 69

Youth career
- 2007–2010: ASVEL
- 2010–2017: Lyon

Senior career*
Years	Team	Apps	(Gls)
2017–2018	Lyon II	12	(6)
2017–2018	Lyon	2	(0)
2018–2019	Monaco II	1	(0)
2018–2023	Monaco	15	(1)
2021–2022	→ Nantes (loan)	22	(2)
2023–2025	St. Gallen	83	(27)
2025–2026	Paris FC	24	(5)
2026–	Lecce	5	(0)

International career
2016–2017	France U16	6	(6)
2017	France U17	8	(4)
2017	France U18	7	(2)
2020	France U19	1	(0)
- * Club domestic league appearances and goals as of 25 October 2026

Willem Davnis Louis Didier Geubbels (born 16 August 2001) is a French professional footballer who plays as forward for Serie A club Lecce.

== Club career ==
=== Lyon ===
Geubbels started his playing career at Lyon's academy. He made his first team debut on 23 September 2017 in a 3–3 home draw against Dijon in Ligue 1. He entered the field after 84 minutes, replacing Lucas Tousart. In doing so, Geubbels became the first player born in the 21st century to appear in Ligue 1, as well as the fifth youngest player ever to make a Ligue 1 debut at 16 years, one month and seven days old. On 7 December, Geubbels came on for an injured Maxwel Cornet in the 45+1 minute of a 1–0 away loss to Atalanta in the Europa League. In doing so, Geubbels once again became the first player born in the 21st century to appear in the UEFA Europa League as well as the youngest player ever to make a Europa League debut at 16 years and 113 days old.

=== Monaco ===
On 19 June 2018, Geubbels signed with Monaco for €20 million.

==== Loan to Nantes ====
On 31 August 2021, he joined Nantes on loan for the 2021–22 season with an option to buy. He scored his first goal for the club on 2 January 2022 in the Coupe de France against Vitré. Three weeks later, he scored again in a 4–2 league victory over Lorient. At the end of the season, marked by ups and downs, he returned to Monaco. During his loan spell, Nantes managed to win the Coupe de France.

=== St. Gallen ===
On 23 January 2023, Geubbels signed a 2½-year contract with St. Gallen in Switzerland.

=== Paris FC ===
On 17 August 2025, Geubbels moved to Paris FC in Ligue 1, signing a five-year contract.

=== Lecce ===
On 2 August 2026, Geubbels signed with Lecce in Serie A, signing a four-year contract.

== Personal life ==
Geubbels was born in France to a Dutch father, and a Central African mother. His uncles, Amos Youga and Kelly Youga, are both footballers who represented the Central African Republic national team.

== Career statistics ==
As of 25 January 2026

Club	Season	League			National Cup		League Cup		Europe		Other		Total	
Club	Season	Division	Apps	Goals	Apps	Goals	Apps	Goals	Apps	Goals	Apps	Goals	Apps	Goals
Lyon	2017–18	Ligue 1	2	0	0	0	1	0	1 (Note: Appearance in UEFA Europa League)	0	—		4	0
Monaco	2018–19	Ligue 1	1	0	0	0	1	0	0	0	—		2	0
Monaco	2019–20	Ligue 1	0	0	0	0	0	0	—		—		0	0
Monaco	2020–21	Ligue 1	14	1	1	0	—		—		—		15	1
Monaco	Total		15	1	1	0	1	0	0	0	0	0	17	1
Nantes (loan)	2021–22	Ligue 1	22	2	4	1	—		—		—		26	3
St. Gallen	2022–23	Swiss Super League	17	2	1	0	—		—		—		18	2
St. Gallen	2023–24	Swiss Super League	32	8	1	0	—		—		—		33	8
St. Gallen	2024–25	Swiss Super League	31	14	1	1	—		9 (Note: Appearance in UEFA Conference League)	2	—		41	17
St. Gallen	2025–26	Swiss Super League	3	3	0	0	—		—		—		3	3
St. Gallen	Total		83	27	3	1	0	0	9	2	0	0	95	30
Paris FC	2025–26	Ligue 1	16	3	2	0	—		—		—		18	3
Lecce	2026–27	Serie A	0	0	0	0	—		—		—		0	0
Career total			138	33	10	2	2	0	10	2	0	0	160	37

== Honours ==
Nantes

- Coupe de France: 2021–22
