= Jérémy Guillemenot =

Swiss footballer (born 1998)

Personal information
- Full name: Jérémy Bruno Guillemenot
- Date of birth: 6 January 1998 (age 28)
- Place of birth: Geneva, Switzerland
- Height: 1.83 m (6 ft 0 in)
- Position: Forward

Team information
- Current team: Wisła Kraków
- Number: 21

Youth career
- 2006–2008: Urania Genève Sport
- 2008–2016: Servette
- 2016–2017: Barcelona

Senior career*
Years	Team	Apps	(Gls)
2014–2016	Servette	3	(0)
2016–2018	Barcelona B	2	(1)
2018	→ Sabadell (loan)	23	(1)
2018–2019	Rapid Wien	3	(0)
2019–2023	St. Gallen	140	(32)
2023–2026	Servette	85	(15)
2026–	Wisła Kraków	2	(1)

International career
2013–2014	Switzerland U16	8	(1)
2014	Switzerland U17	5	(4)
2015–2016	Switzerland U18	6	(3)
2015–2017	Switzerland U19	13	(8)
2017–2018	Switzerland U20	7	(0)
2018–2021	Switzerland U21	17	(4)
- * Club domestic league appearances and goals as of 30 August 2026

Jérémy Bruno Guillemenot (born 6 January 1998) is a Swiss professional footballer who plays as a forward for Ekstraklasa club Wisła Kraków.

== Career statistics ==
As of match played 16 May 2026

Club	Season	League			National cup (Note: Includes Austrian Cup, Swiss Cup)		Europe		Total	
Club	Season	Division	Apps	Goals	Apps	Goals	Apps	Goals	Apps	Goals
Servette	2015–16	Swiss Challenge League	3	0	0	0	—		3	0
Barcelona B	2016–17	Primera Federación	2	1	—		—		2	1
Sabadell	2017–18	Primera Federación	23	1	—		—		23	1
Rapid Wien II	2018–19	Austrian Regional League East	3	3	—		—		3	3
Rapid Wien	2018-19	Austrian Bundesliga	3	0	1	0	1 (Note: Appearance in UEFA Europa League)	0	5	0
St. Gallen	2018–19	Swiss Super League	11	3	0	0	—		11	3
St. Gallen	2019–20	Swiss Super League	32	6	1	0	—		33	6
St. Gallen	2020–21	Swiss Super League	34	3	4	1	1	0	39	4
St. Gallen	2021–22	Swiss Super League	31	9	4	1	—		35	10
St. Gallen	2022–23	Swiss Super League	32	11	2	3	—		34	14
St. Gallen	Total		140	32	11	5	1	0	152	37
Servette	2023–24	Swiss Super League	33	8	5	1	12 (Note: Four appearances in UEFA Champions League, five appearances in UEFA Europa League, three appearances in UEFA Europa Conference League)	0	50	9
Servette	2024–25	Swiss Super League	27	0	2	2	3 (Note: One appearance in UEFA Europa League, two appearances and one goal in UEFA Conference League)	1	32	3
Servette	2025–26	Swiss Super League	25	7	0	0	5 (Note: Two appearances in UEFA Champions League, two appearances and one goal in UEFA Europa League, one appearance in UEFA Conference League)	1	30	8
Servette	Total		85	15	7	3	20	2	112	20
Wisła Kraków	2026–27	Ekstraklasa	0	0	0	0	—		0	0
Career total			259	52	19	8	22	2	300	62

== Honours ==
Servette

- Swiss Cup: 2023–24
