= Lukas Görtler =

German footballer

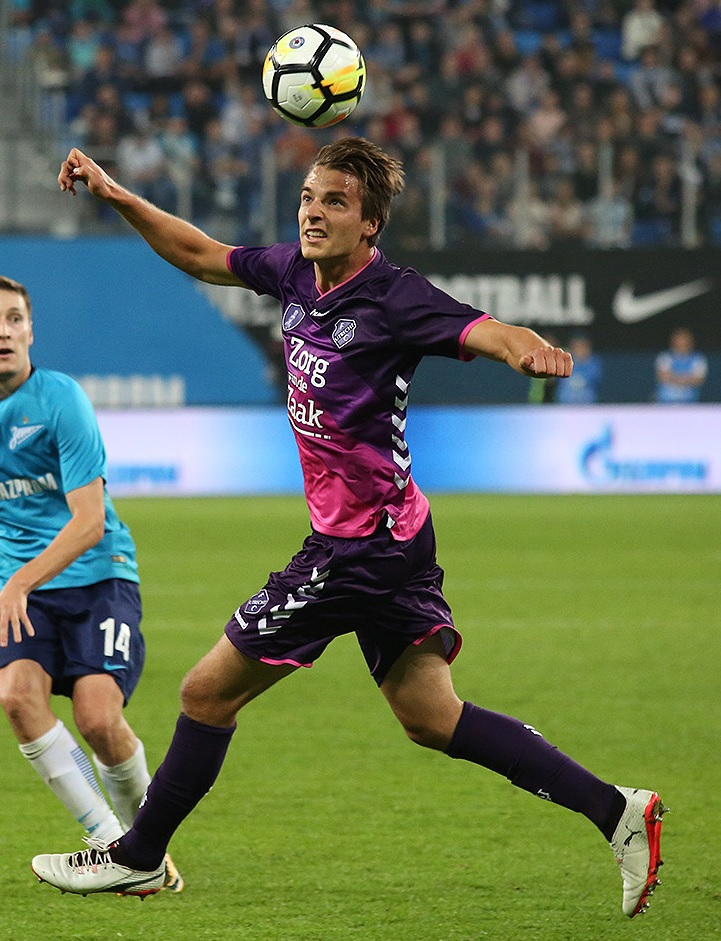
- Görtler with Utrecht in 2017

Personal information
- Full name: Lukas Maria Görtler
- Date of birth: 15 June 1994 (age 32)
- Place of birth: Bamberg, Germany
- Height: 1.83 m (6 ft 0 in)
- Positions: Midfielder; forward

Team information
- Current team: St. Gallen
- Number: 16

Youth career
- 1998–2005: SC Kemmern
- 2005–2007: Greuther Fürth
- 2007–2010: Eintracht Bamberg
- 2010–2012: 1. FC Nürnberg

Senior career*
| Years | Team | Apps | (Gls) |
| 2012–2014 | Eintracht Bamberg | 60 | (10) |
| 2014–2015 | Bayern Munich II | 27 | (11) |
| 2015 | Bayern Munich | 1 | (0) |
| 2015–2017 | 1. FC Kaiserslautern | 43 | (2) |
| 2017–2019 | Utrecht | 45 | (1) |
| 2017 | Jong Utrecht | 2 | (0) |
| 2019– | St. Gallen | 213 | (37) |
- * Club domestic league appearances and goals as of 28 September 2026

Lukas Maria Görtler (born 15 June 1994) is a German professional footballer who plays as a midfielder or forward for Swiss Super League club St. Gallen.

== Career ==
Görtler joined Bayern in 2014, having previously been playing for Eintracht Bamberg. On 2 May 2015, he made his debut for first-team in away match against Bayer Leverkusen.

On 16 June 2015, it was confirmed that Görtler had signed a three-year contract with 2. Bundesliga club 1. FC Kaiserslautern.

On 3 August 2017, it was confirmed that Görtler had signed a three-year contract with Eredivisie club FC Utrecht.

After two seasons with Utrecht, it was announced on 8 July 2019 that Görtler had joined Swiss club FC St. Gallen. Having played as forward for most of his career, he was deployed as a central midfielder at St. Gallen.

== Career statistics ==
As of match played 17 March 2026

Appearances and goals by club, season and competition
| Club | Season | League | | | National cup (Note: Includes DFB Pokal, KNVB Cup and Swiss Cup) | | Continental | | Other | | Total | |
| Club | Season | Division | Apps | Goals | Apps | Goals | Apps | Goals | Apps | Goals | Apps | Goals |
|---|---|---|---|---|---|---|---|---|---|---|---|---|
| Eintracht Bamberg | 2012–13 | Regionalliga Bayern | 29 | 2 | — | | — | | — | | 29 | 2 |
| Eintracht Bamberg | 2013–14 | Regionalliga Bayern | 31 | 8 | — | | — | | — | | 31 | 8 |
| Eintracht Bamberg | Total | | 60 | 10 | — | | — | | — | | 60 | 10 |
| Bayern Munich II | 2014–15 | Regionalliga Bayern | 27 | 11 | — | | — | | — | | 27 | 11 |
| Bayern Munich | 2014–15 | Bundesliga | 1 | 0 | 0 | 0 | 0 | 0 | 0 | 0 | 1 | 0 |
| 1. FC Kaiserslautern | 2015–16 | 2. Bundesliga | 18 | 2 | 1 | 0 | — | | — | | 19 | 2 |
| 1. FC Kaiserslautern | 2016–17 | 2. Bundesliga | 23 | 0 | 1 | 0 | — | | — | | 24 | 0 |
| 1. FC Kaiserslautern | Total | | 41 | 2 | 2 | 0 | — | | — | | 43 | 2 |
| Utrecht | 2017–18 | Eredivisie | 23 | 1 | 2 | 1 | 2 (Note: Appearance(s) in UEFA Europa League) | 0 | 4 (Note: Appearance(s) in Eredivisie European competition play-offs) | 0 | 31 | 2 |
| Utrecht | 2018–19 | Eredivisie | 14 | 0 | 3 | 0 | — | | 4 | 0 | 21 | 0 |
| Utrecht | Total | | 37 | 1 | 5 | 1 | 2 | 0 | 8 | 0 | 52 | 2 |
| Jong Utrecht | 2017–18 | Eerste Divisie | 2 | 0 | — | | — | | — | | 2 | 0 |
| St. Gallen | 2019–20 | Swiss Super League | 34 | 3 | 1 | 0 | — | | — | | 35 | 3 |
| St. Gallen | 2020–21 | Swiss Super League | 32 | 2 | 4 | 1 | 1 | 0 | — | | 37 | 3 |
| St. Gallen | 2021–22 | Swiss Super League | 30 | 5 | 6 | 2 | — | | — | | 36 | 7 |
| St. Gallen | 2022–23 | Swiss Super League | 30 | 9 | 2 | 4 | — | | — | | 32 | 13 |
| St. Gallen | 2023–24 | Swiss Super League | 23 | 2 | 0 | 0 | — | | — | | 23 | 2 |
| St. Gallen | 2024–25 | Swiss Super League | 25 | 5 | 3 | 1 | 12 (Note: Appearance(s) in UEFA Europa Conference League) | 2 | — | | 40 | 8 |
| St. Gallen | 2025–26 | Swiss Super League | 27 | 5 | 2 | 0 | — | | — | | 29 | 5 |
| St. Gallen | Total | | 201 | 31 | 18 | 8 | 13 | 2 | — | | 232 | 41 |
| Career total | | | 369 | 55 | 25 | 9 | 15 | 2 | 8 | 0 | 417 | 66 |

== Honours ==
Individual

- Swiss Super League Top assists provider: 2019–20
