= Mihailo Stevanović (footballer) =

Serbian footballer (born 2002)

Personal information
- Date of birth: 4 January 2002 (age 24)
- Place of birth: Liestal, Switzerland
- Height: 1.85 m (6 ft 1 in)
- Position: Midfielder

Team information
- Current team: St. Gallen
- Number: 64

Youth career
- 2009–2020: Basel

Senior career*
Years	Team	Apps	(Gls)
2020–2022	Basel U21	37	(13)
2020–2022	Basel	1	(0)
2022–2023	Luzern U21	27	(15)
2023	Luzern	1	(0)
2023–	St. Gallen	86	(6)

International career^{‡}
2017–2018	Switzerland U16	6	(1)
2017–2019	Switzerland U17	5	(0)
2019	Switzerland U18	2	(0)
2023–	Serbia U21	4	(0)
- * Club domestic league appearances and goals as of 28 September 2026 ‡ National team caps and goals as of 00:20, 24 November 2023 (UTC)

Mihailo Stevanović (Serbian Cyrillic: Михаило Стевановић; born 4 January 2002) is a professional footballer who plays as a midfielder for St. Gallen. Born in Switzerland, he is a youth international for Serbia.

== Club career ==
On 17 January 2020, Stevanović signed a professional contract with FC Basel until 2022. He made his professional debut with FC Basel in a 0–0 Swiss Super League tie with FC Luzern on 3 August 2020.

On 19 June 2023, Stevanović signed a two-year contract with St. Gallen.

== International career ==
Born in Switzerland, Stevanović was born to a Serbian father and Slovak mother. He is a former youth international for Switzerland. In October 2023, he opted to play for the Serbia U21s.
