= Jordi Quintillà =

Spanish footballer

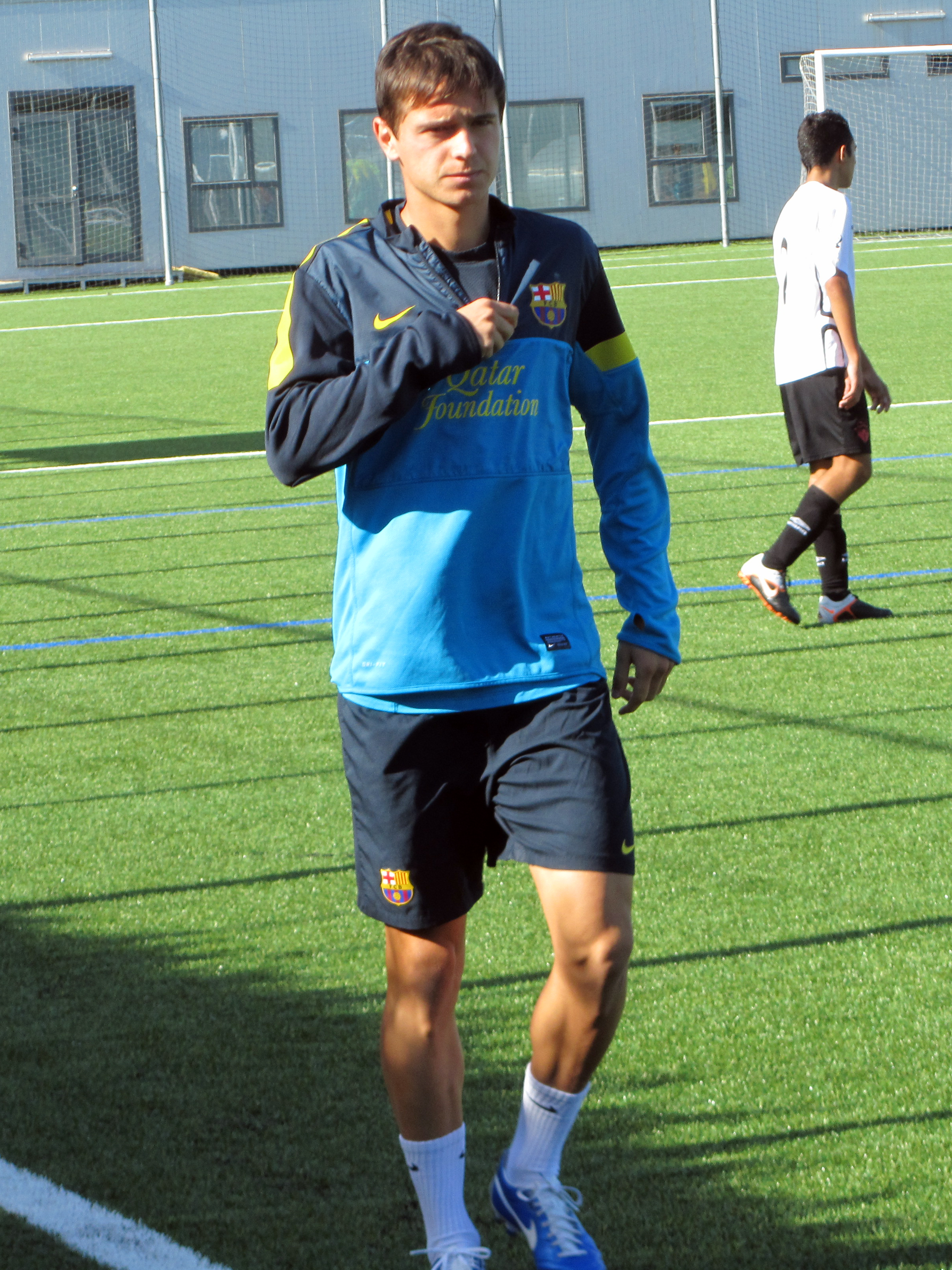
- Quintillà with Barcelona in 2012

Personal information
- Full name: Jordi Quintillà Guasch
- Date of birth: 25 October 1993 (age 33)
- Place of birth: Lleida, Spain
- Height: 1.81 m (5 ft 11 in)
- Position: Defensive midfielder

Team information
- Current team: Nea Salamis Famagusta (on loan from St. Gallen)
- Number: 88

Youth career
- 1999–2009: Lleida
- 2009–2012: Barcelona

Senior career*
Years	Team	Apps	(Gls)
2012–2014	Barcelona B	0	(0)
2013	→ Badalona (loan)	7	(1)
2013–2014	→ Hospitalet (loan)	8	(0)
2014–2015	Ajaccio	16	(0)
2015–2016	Sporting Kansas City	14	(0)
2016	→ Swope Park Rangers (loan)	1	(0)
2017	Puerto Rico FC	28	(3)
2018–2021	St. Gallen	98	(17)
2021–2022	Basel	8	(0)
2022–	St. Gallen	112	(5)
2026–	→ Nea Salamis Famagusta (loan)	0	(0)
- * Club domestic league appearances and goals as of 26 May 2026

Jordi Quintillà Guasch (Catalan pronunciation: [ˈʒɔɾði kintiˈʎa ˈɣwask]; born 25 October 1993) is a Spanish professional footballer who plays as a defensive midfielder for Cypriot First Division club Nea Salamis Famagusta on loan from the Swiss club St. Gallen.

== Career ==
=== Barcelona ===
Born in Lleida, Catalonia, Quintillà joined UE Lleida's youth setup in 1999, aged only six. In 2009, he moved to FC Barcelona's La Masia, and was promoted to the latter's reserve team in June 2012.

On 10 January 2013, Quintillà was loaned to Segunda División B's CF Badalona, until June. He made his senior debuts for the club, scoring his first goal on 24 February, in a 2–0 home win against Villarreal CF B.

On 26 August 2013, Quintillà moved to CE L'Hospitalet also in the third level, in a season-long loan deal.

=== Ajaccio ===
On 25 July 2014, Quintillà signed a three-year deal with French Ligue 2 side AC Ajaccio, after the expiry of his contract with Barça. He made his professional debut on 29 August, starting in a 0–0 away draw against Stade Lavallois.

=== North America ===
On 6 August 2015, Sporting Kansas City announced that they had signed Quintillà. While he did not score in 15 appearances, he did net the winner in the penalty shootout as they won away to the Philadelphia Union in the U.S. Open Cup final on 30 September that year.

Quintillà was released by Sporting Kansas City on 23 June 2016. The following 9 February, he signed with North American Soccer League side Puerto Rico FC.

=== Switzerland ===
On 19 June 2018, Quintillà returned to Europe, joining FC St. Gallen of the Swiss Super League on a two-year deal.

In March 2021, it was announced that Quintillà would sign with FC Basel as his contract with St. Gallen expired. He joined the club on 1 July for their 2021–22 season under head coach Patrick Rahmen. After playing in five test games, Quintillà played his debut for his new club in the second qualifying round of the 2021–22 UEFA Europa Conference League, a home game in the St. Jakob-Park on 22 July 2021 as Basel won 3–0 against Partizani Tirana. On 22 January 2022, Quintillà returned to St. Gallen on a 3.5-year contract. During his short period with Basel Quintillà played a total of 17 games for them without scoring a goal. Eight of these games were in the Swiss Super League, two in the Swiss Cup, and seven in the Conference League.

On 1 July 2026, Quintillà moved to Nea Salamis Famagusta in Cyprus on loan for the 2026–27 season.

== Personal life ==
Quintillà's younger brother, Xavi, is also a footballer, who plays as a defender. Both were in the Barcelona youth system together.

== Career statistics ==
As of match played 23 August 2023

Appearances and goals by club, season and competition
Club	Season	League			National cup (Note: Includes Copa del Rey, Coupe de France, U.S. Open Cup, Swiss Cup)		League cup (Note: Includes Coupe de la Ligue)		Continental		Other		Total	
Club	Season	Division	Apps	Goals	Apps	Goals	Apps	Goals	Apps	Goals	Apps	Goals	Apps	Goals
Badalona (loan)	2012–13	Segunda División B	8	1	0	0	—		—		—		8	1
L'Hospitalet (loan)	2013–14	Segunda División B	8	0	1	0	—		—		—		9	0
AC Ajaccio	2014–15	Ligue 2	16	0	2	0	2	0	—		—		20	0
Sporting Kansas City	2015	MLS	8	0	1	0	—		—		—		9	0
Sporting Kansas City	2016	MLS	6	0	0	0	—		—		—		6	0
Sporting Kansas City	Total		14	0	1	0	—		—		—		15	0
Swope Park Rangers	2016	USL	1	0	—		—		—		—		1	0
Puerto Rico FC	2017	NASL	28	3	—		—		2 (Note: Appearance(s) in Caribbean Club Championship)	0	—		30	3
St. Gallen	2018–19	Super League	34	2	3	0	—		2 (Note: Appearance(s) in UEFA Europa League)	0	—		39	2
St. Gallen	2019–20	Super League	33	13	2	0	—		—		—		35	13
St. Gallen	2020–21	Super League	31	2	4	0	—		1	0	—		36	2
St. Gallen	Total		98	17	9	0	—		3	0	—		110	17
Basel	2021–22	Super League	8	0	2	0	—		7 (Note: Appearance(s) in UEFA Conference League)	0	—		17	0
St. Gallen	2021–22	Super League	15	2	3	1	—		—		—		18	3
St. Gallen	2022–23	Super League	35	1	4	0	—		—		—		39	1
St. Gallen	Total		50	3	7	1	—		—		—		57	4
Career total			231	24	22	1	2	0	12	0	—		267	25

== Honours ==
Individual

- Swiss Super League Team of the Year: 2019–20, 2020–21,
