= Leonidas Stergiou =

Swiss footballer (born 2002)

Personal information
- Date of birth: 3 March 2002 (age 24)
- Place of birth: Wattwil, Switzerland
- Height: 1.80 m (5 ft 11 in)
- Position: Centre-back

Team information
- Current team: VfB Stuttgart
- Number: 20

Youth career
- Wil
- 2015–2019: St. Gallen

Senior career*
Years	Team	Apps	(Gls)
2018–2019	St. Gallen II	5	(0)
2019–2024	St. Gallen	139	(1)
2023–2024	→ VfB Stuttgart (loan)	15	(1)
2024–	VfB Stuttgart	14	(1)
2024–	VfB Stuttgart II	5	(0)
2026	→ 1. FC Heidenheim (loan)	4	(0)

International career^{‡}
2016–2017	Switzerland U15	6	(0)
2017–2018	Switzerland U16	8	(0)
2018–2019	Switzerland U17	9	(1)
2019–2020	Switzerland U19	4	(0)
2020–2024	Switzerland U21	24	(1)
2022–	Switzerland	6	(0)
- * Club domestic league appearances and goals as of 28 August 2026 ‡ National team caps and goals as of 29 June 2024

Leonidas Stergiou (born 3 March 2002) is a Swiss professional footballer who plays as a centre-back for German Bundesliga club VfB Stuttgart and the Switzerland national team.

== Club career ==
Stergiou initially made his competitive debut for the senior St. Gallen club on 6 February 2019, playing in a 3–1 victory against FC Zürich.

On 22 August 2023, Stergiou joined VfB Stuttgart in Germany on loan. Stergiou played just 39 minutes in the first half of the season, but made his first start in February and then became a regular starter. On 4 May 2024, he scored his first Bundesliga goal in a 3–1 victory against Bayern Munich. On 15 May 2024, the loan was made permanent and Stergiou signed a contract until June 2028 with VfB Stuttgart.

On 15 January 2026, Stergiou joined 1. FC Heidenheim on loan for the remainder of the season.

== International career ==
Stergiou was the captain of Switzerland U21 at the 2023 UEFA European Under-21 Championship, where they reached quarter-finals. He made his debut for the Switzerland senior national team on 12 June 2022 in a Nations League match against Spain, replacing Ricardo Rodriguez in the 79th minute as Switzerland won 1–0. In June 2024, Stergiou was named in the Swiss squad for UEFA Euro 2024 in Germany. He replaced Silvan Widmer as a substitute in the 68th minute of the team's opening Group A match against Hungary.

== Personal life ==
Stergiou was born in Wattwil in the Canton of St. Gallen, to a Greek father and a Serbian mother. After joining the FC St. Gallen academy at a young age, he progressed through the ranks to the first team.

== Career statistics ==
=== Club ===
As of match played 28 August 2026

Appearances and goals by club, season and competition
Club	Season	League			National cup (Note: Includes Swiss Cup, DFB-Pokal)		Europe		Other		Total	
Club	Season	Division	Apps	Goals	Apps	Goals	Apps	Goals	Apps	Goals	Apps	Goals
St. Gallen II	2018–19	Swiss 1. Liga	5	0	—		—		—		5	0
St. Gallen	2018–19	Swiss Super League	11	0	0	0	—		—		11	0
St. Gallen	2019–20	Swiss Super League	34	1	2	0	—		—		36	1
St. Gallen	2020–21	Swiss Super League	32	0	4	0	1 (Note: Appearance in UEFA Europa League)	0	—		37	0
St. Gallen	2021–22	Swiss Super League	27	0	3	0	—		—		30	0
St. Gallen	2022–23	Swiss Super League	35	0	4	0	—		—		39	0
St. Gallen	Total		139	1	13	0	1	0	—		153	1
VfB Stuttgart (loan)	2023–24	Bundesliga	15	1	3	0	—		—		18	1
VfB Stuttgart	2024–25	Bundesliga	12	1	2	0	4 (Note: Appearances in UEFA Champions League)	0	—		18	1
VfB Stuttgart	2025–26	Bundesliga	1	0	1	0	0	0	—		2	0
VfB Stuttgart	2026–27	Bundesliga	1	0	0	0	0	0	—		1	0
VfB Stuttgart	Total		14	1	3	0	4	0	—		21	1
VfB Stuttgart II	2024–25	3. Liga	1	0	—		—		—		1	0
VfB Stuttgart II	2025–26	3. Liga	4	0	—		—		—		4	0
VfB Stuttgart II	Total		5	0	—		—		—		5	0
1. FC Heidenheim (loan)	2025–26	Bundesliga	5	0	—		—		—		5	0
Career total			183	3	19	0	5	0	0	0	207	3

=== International ===
As of match played 29 June 2024

Appearances and goals by national team and year
National team	Year	Apps	Goals
Switzerland	2022	1	0
Switzerland	2024	5	0
Total		6	0
