= Samba Lélé Diba =

Senegalese footballer (born 2003)

Personal information
- Date of birth: 24 December 2003 (age 22)
- Place of birth: Louga, Senegal
- Height: 1.95 m (6 ft 5 in)
- Position: Defensive midfielder

Team information
- Current team: Grenoble
- Number: 30

Youth career
- 2019–2022: ASEC Ndiambour

Senior career*
| Years | Team | Apps | (Gls) |
| 2022–2024 | Servette | 25 | (0) |
| 2024–2025 | Athens Kallithea | 17 | (0) |
| 2025– | Grenoble | 26 | (0) |

International career^{‡}
| 2022– | Senegal U23 | 2 | (0) |
| 2023– | Senegal | 1 | (0) |
- * Club domestic league appearances and goals as of 12 May 2026 ‡ National team caps and goals as of 04:11, 11 September 2023 (UTC)

Samba Lélé Diba (born 24 December 2003) is a Senegalese professional footballer who plays as a defensive midfielder for French Ligue 2 club Grenoble.

== Club career ==
A youth product of the Senegalese club ASEC Ndiambour, Diba transferred to the Swiss club Servette on 21 June 2022 on a 3-year contract. He made his senior and professional debut with Servette in a 1–0 Swiss Super League win over FC Winterthur on 6 August 2022.

On 7 August 2024, Diba joined Athens Kallithea FC.

On 31 January 2025, Diba signed with Grenoble in French Ligue 2 until June 2028.

== International career ==
Diba is a youth international for Senegal, having played up to the Senegal U23s. He was called up to the senior Senegal national team for a 2023 Africa Cup of Nations qualification match in September 2023.

== Personal life ==
Diba's father Daouda Diba was a Senegalese footballer in the 1990s.

== Career statistics ==
As of 21 October 2024

| Club | Season | League | | | Cup | | Continental | | Other | | Total | |
| Club | Season | Division | Apps | Goals | Apps | Goals | Apps | Goals | Apps | Goals | Apps | Goals |
|---|---|---|---|---|---|---|---|---|---|---|---|---|
| Servette | 2022–23 | Swiss Super League | 15 | 0 | 3 | 0 | — | | — | | 18 | 0 |
| Servette | 2023–24 | Swiss Super League | 10 | 0 | 3 | 0 | 7 | 0 | — | | 20 | 0 |
| Servette | Total | | 25 | 0 | 6 | 0 | 7 | 0 | — | | 38 | 0 |
| Athens Kallithea | 2024–25 | Superleague Greece 2 | 7 | 0 | 0 | 0 | — | | — | | 7 | 0 |
| Career total | | | 32 | 0 | 6 | 0 | 7 | 0 | 0 | 0 | 45 | 0 |
