= Ricardo Azevedo (footballer) =

Swiss footballer (born 2001)

Personal information
- Full name: Ricardo Azevedo Alves
- Date of birth: 2 December 2001 (age 24)
- Place of birth: Geneva, Switzerland
- Height: 1.69 m (5 ft 7 in)
- Position: Midfielder

Team information
- Current team: Étoile Carouge
- Number: 8

Senior career*
| Years | Team | Apps | (Gls) |
| 2019–2022 | Servette II | 21 | (13) |
| 2019–2022 | Servette | 31 | (0) |
| 2022–2023 | St. Gallen II | 4 | (1) |
| 2022–2023 | St. Gallen | 13 | (0) |
| 2023–2025 | Yverdon-Sport | 26 | (1) |
| 2025 | → Étoile Carouge (loan) | 18 | (2) |
| 2025– | Étoile Carouge | 33 | (4) |

International career^{‡}
| 2015–2016 | Switzerland U15 | 3 | (0) |
| 2016 | Switzerland U16 | 4 | (0) |
| 2017 | Switzerland U17 | 3 | (0) |
| 2019 | Switzerland U18 | 2 | (0) |
| 2019–2020 | Switzerland U19 | 6 | (2) |
| 2020 | Switzerland U20 | 1 | (0) |
- * Club domestic league appearances and goals as of 30 September 2026 ‡ National team caps and goals as of 7 October 2020

Ricardo Azevedo Alves (born 2 December 2001) is a Swiss footballer who plays for Étoile Carouge.

== Club career ==
On 23 August 2022, Azevedo signed a two-year contract with St. Gallen.

On 17 July 2023, he joined Yverdon-Sport on a two-year contract. On 23 December 2024, Alves was loaned to Étoile Carouge for the rest of the season.

== Personal life ==
Born in Switzerland, Azevedo is of Portuguese descent.
