= Bledian Krasniqi =

Swiss footballer (born 2001)

Personal information
- Date of birth: 17 June 2001 (age 25)
- Place of birth: Zürich, Switzerland
- Height: 1.73 m (5 ft 8 in)
- Position: Midfielder

Team information
- Current team: Zürich
- Number: 7

Youth career
- 2009–2018: Zürich

Senior career*
Years	Team	Apps	(Gls)
2018–2022	Zürich U21	24	(2)
2018–	Zürich	160	(14)
2019–2021	→ Wil (loan)	67	(5)

International career^{‡}
2016	Switzerland U15	2	(0)
2016–2017	Switzerland U16	9	(2)
2017–2018	Switzerland U17	11	(1)
2018–2019	Switzerland U18	4	(1)
2019–2020	Switzerland U19	4	(1)
2020	Switzerland U20	1	(0)
2021–2023	Switzerland U21	7	(0)
2025–	Kosovo	1	(0)
- * Club domestic league appearances and goals as of 28 September 2026 ‡ National team caps and goals as of 9 June 2025

Bledian Krasniqi (born 17 June 2001) is a professional footballer who plays as a midfielder for Swiss Super League club Zürich. Born in Switzerland, he represented that nation at youth international levels, but in 2024 switched to play for the Kosovo national team.

== Club career ==
On 29 November 2018, Krasniqi made his professional debut against AEK Larnaca in UEFA Europa League. On 20 June 2019, it was confirmed that Krasniqi had been loaned out to FC Wil for the 2019–20 season.

== International career ==
Born and raised in Switzerland, he is of Albanian descent and hails from Gjilan, Kosovo. From 2016, until 2023, Krasniqi has been part of Switzerland at youth international level, respectively has been part of the U15, U16, U17, U18, U19, U20 and U21 teams and he with these teams played 38 matches and scored five goals.

On 14 November 2024, FC Zürich announced that Krasniqi had decided to represent the Kosovo national team. On 30 May 2025, he received a call-up from Kosovo for the friendly matches against Armenia and Comoros. His debut with Kosovo came ten days later in the friendly match against Comoros after coming on as a substitute at 70th minute in place of Meriton Korenica.
