= Musah Nuhu =

Ghanaian footballer

Personal information
- Date of birth: 17 January 1997 (age 29)
- Place of birth: Accra, Ghana
- Height: 1.95 m (6 ft 5 in)
- Position: Centre-back

Senior career*
Years	Team	Apps	(Gls)
2016	New Edubiase	25	(0)
2017–2019	WAFA	41	(4)
2018–2019	→ St. Gallen (loan)	13	(1)
2019–2025	St. Gallen	24	(0)
2019–2025	→ St. Gallen II	11	(1)
2022	→ KuPS (loan)	3	(0)
2022	→ KuPS II (loan)	1	(0)
- * Club domestic league appearances and goals as of 24 May 2025

Musah Nuhu (born 17 January 1997) is a Ghanaian professional footballer who plays as a centre back.

== Career ==
Nuhu joined FC St. Gallen in the summer 2018 on loan from WAFA. He impressed in the second half of the season and in May 2019 it was confirmed, that he had been handed a three-year permanent deal with the club.

On 31 July 2022, Nuhu joined Finnish club KuPS on loan.

== Career statistics ==
As of 6 May 2025

Appearances and goals by club, season and competition
Club	Season	League			National cup (Note: Includes Swiss Cup)		Continental		Total	
Club	Season	Division	Apps	Goals	Apps	Goals	Apps	Goals	Apps	Goals
New Edubiase	2016	Ghana Premier League	25	0	–		–		25	0
WAFA	2017	Ghana Premier League	28	2	–		–		28	2
WAFA	2018	Ghana Premier League	13	2	–		–		13	2
WAFA	Total		41	4	0	0	0	0	41	4
St. Gallen (loan)	2018–19	Swiss Super League	13	1	–		–		13	1
St. Gallen II (loan)	2018–19	Swiss 1. Liga	5	1	–		–		5	1
St. Gallen	2019–20	Swiss Super League	4	0	–		–		4	0
St. Gallen	2020–21	Swiss Super League	11	0	1	0	–		12	0
St. Gallen	2021–22	Swiss Super League	9	0	1	0	–		10	0
St. Gallen	2022–23	Swiss Super League	0	0	0	0	–		0	0
St. Gallen	2023–24	Swiss Super League	0	0	0	0	–		0	0
St. Gallen	Total		24	0	2	0	0	0	26	0
St. Gallen II	2020–21	Swiss 1. Liga	4	0	–		–		4	0
St. Gallen II	2023–24	Swiss Promotion League	2	0	–		–		2	0
St. Gallen II	Total		6	0	0	0	0	0	6	0
KuPS (loan)	2022	Veikkausliiga	3	0	0	0	2 (Note: Appearances in UEFA Europa Conference League)	0	5	0
KuPS Akatemia (loan)	2022	Kakkonen	1	0	–		–		1	0
Career total			118	6	2	0	2	0	122	6
