= Leonhard Münst =

German footballer (born 2002)

Personal information
- Full name: Leonhard Luis Münst
- Date of birth: 22 January 2002 (age 24)
- Place of birth: Stuttgart, Germany
- Height: 1.83 m (6 ft 0 in)
- Position: Midfielder

Team information
- Current team: VfL Osnabrück
- Number: 8

Youth career
- VfB Stuttgart

Senior career*
Years	Team	Apps	(Gls)
2021–2025	VfB Stuttgart II	66	(11)
2021–2023	→ St. Gallen II (loan)	23	(1)
2021–2023	→ St. Gallen (loan)	8	(0)
2025–2026	Viktoria Köln	35	(6)
2026–	VfL Osnabrück	0	(0)
- * Club domestic league appearances and goals as of 29 May 2026

Leonhard Luis Münst (born 22 January 2002) is a German professional footballer who plays as a midfielder for 2. Bundesliga club VfL Osnabrück.

== Career ==
On 19 May 2025, Münst signed with Viktoria Köln.

On 23 June 2026, Münst joined 2. Bundesliga club VfL Osnabrück.
