= Basil Stillhart =

Swiss footballer (born 1994)

Personal information
- Date of birth: 24 March 1994 (age 32)
- Place of birth: Wil, Switzerland
- Height: 1.78 m (5 ft 10 in)
- Position: Defensive midfielder

Youth career
- –2012: Wil

Senior career*
Years	Team	Apps	(Gls)
2012–2018	Wil	134	(9)
2018–2020	Thun	67	(7)
2020–2023	St. Gallen	83	(7)
2023–2026	Winterthur	60	(4)

International career^{‡}
2017	Switzerland U21	2	(0)
- * Club domestic league appearances and goals as of 26 May 2026 ‡ National team caps and goals as of 10 April 2017

Basil Stillhart (born 24 March 1994) is a Swiss professional footballer who plays as a defensive midfielder.

== Club career ==
On 23 June 2023, Stillhart signed a three-season contract with Winterthur.
