= Alessandro Kräuchi =

Swiss footballer (born 1998)

Personal information
- Full name: Alessandro Samuele Kräuchi
- Date of birth: 3 June 1998 (age 28)
- Place of birth: St. Gallen, Switzerland
- Height: 1.75 m (5 ft 9 in)
- Position: Winger

Team information
- Current team: FC Rüthi

Youth career
- 2008–2018: St. Gallen
- 2018: → FC Wil (loan)

Senior career*
Years	Team	Apps	(Gls)
2018–2022	St. Gallen U21	75	(14)
2018–2023	St. Gallen	39	(1)
2018	→ Wil U21 (loan)	1	(0)
2023–2025	Vaduz	45	(0)
2025–2026	Tuggen	20	(2)
2026–	FC Rüthi	0	(0)

International career
2013	Switzerland U15	1	(1)
2013	Switzerland U16	1	(0)
2018	Switzerland U21	1	(0)
- * Club domestic league appearances and goals as of 30 May 2026

Alessandro Samuele Kräuchi (born 3 June 1998) is a Swiss professional footballer who plays for FC Rüthi.

== Club career ==
Kräuchi made his professional debut with St. Gallen in a 2–0 Swiss Super League loss to BSC Young Boys on 26 September 2018.

On 17 April 2023, Kräuchi signed a two-year contract with Vaduz.

== International career ==
Kräuchi was born in Switzerland and is of Italian descent. He is a one-time youth international for the Switzerland U15s and U16s.
