= Víctor Ruiz (footballer, born 1993) =

Spanish footballer

Personal information
- Full name: Víctor Ruiz Abril
- Date of birth: 2 November 1993 (age 33)
- Place of birth: Valencia, Spain
- Height: 1.74 m (5 ft 8 1/2 in)
- Position: Forward

Team information
- Current team: Terengganu
- Number: 10

Youth career
- Valencia

Senior career*
Years	Team	Apps	(Gls)
2012–2014	Utiel	48	(3)
2014–2015	Olímpic Xàtiva	23	(2)
2015–2016	Valencia B	23	(1)
2016–2017	Alzira	24	(3)
2017–2018	Yeclano	35	(5)
2018	Formentera	15	(10)
2019–2022	St. Gallen	101	(16)
2022–2024	Al-Fayha	32	(3)
2024–2025	St. Gallen	20	(1)
2025–2026	Kuala Lumpur City	1	(0)
2026-	Terengganu		
- * Club domestic league appearances and goals as of 22 July 2026

Víctor Ruiz Abril (born 2 November 1993) is a Spanish professional footballer who plays as a forward for Malaysia Super League club Terengganu.

== Club career ==
Born in Utiel, Ruiz graduated from the youth academy of local Valencia CF and made his senior debut with CD Utiel in the 2012–13 season, in Tercera División. On 26 July 2014, he moved to Segunda División B side CD Olímpic de Xàtiva. On 19 April 2015, he scored his first goal for the club in a 2–2 draw against Villarreal CF B. On 13 July 2015, he moved to Valencia CF Mestalla in the same tier.

On 17 September 2016, Ruiz returned to Tercera after signing with UD Alzira. In the following two seasons, he continued his career in the same tier with Yeclano Deportivo and SD Formentera.

On 9 December 2018, Ruiz moved abroad and joined Swiss Super League club St. Gallen on a contract running from 2019 until the summer of 2021. On 2 June 2020, he extended his contract with the club until 2023.

On 2 August 2022, Ruiz joined Saudi Arabian club Al-Fayha on a two-year deal.

On 14 February 2024, Ruiz returned to St. Gallen until the end of the season. He left St. Gallen exactly one year later, by mutual consent.
