= Christian Witzig =

Swiss footballer (born 2001)

Personal information
- Date of birth: 9 January 2001 (age 25)
- Place of birth: Münsterlingen, Switzerland
- Height: 1.78 m (5 ft 10 in)
- Position: Midfielder

Team information
- Current team: St. Gallen
- Number: 7

Youth career
- 2005–2008: FC Tägerwilen
- 2008–2009: FC Münchwilen
- 2009–2015: Wil
- 2015–2019: St. Gallen

Senior career*
| Years | Team | Apps | (Gls) |
| 2017–2021 | St. Gallen II | 53 | (3) |
| 2021– | St. Gallen | 140 | (19) |

International career^{‡}
| 2016 | Switzerland U15 | 1 | (0) |
| 2016–2017 | Switzerland U16 | 4 | (0) |
| 2017–2018 | Switzerland U17 | 4 | (1) |
| 2024– | Switzerland | 1 | (0) |
- * Club domestic league appearances and goals as of 28 September 2026 ‡ National team caps and goals as of 15 October 2024

Christian Witzig (born 9 January 2001) is a Swiss professional footballer who plays as a midfielder for St. Gallen and the Switzerland national team.

== Club career ==
Witzig is a product of the youth academies of Tägerwilen, Münchwilen, Wil and St. Gallen. He began his senior career with the reserves of St. Gallen in 2017. On 24 June 2021, he signed his first professional contract with St. Gallen, tying him to the club until June 2023. He made his professional debut with St. Gallen in a 3–1 Swiss Super League loss to Sion on 27 November 2021.

== International career ==
Witzig is a youth international for Switzerland, having played from the U15 to U17 levels. He represented the Switzerland U17s at the 2018 UEFA European Under-17 Championship.
