= Sitterstadion =

Football stadium in St. Gallen, Switzerland

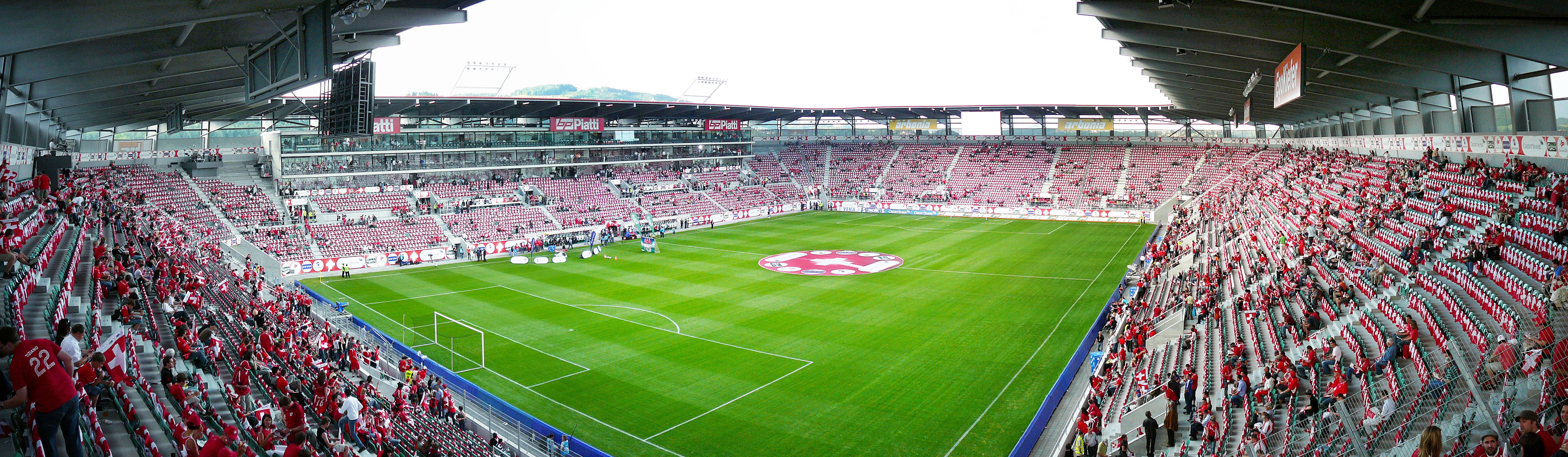
- Interactive map of Sitterstadion
- Former names: AFG Arena (2008–2016) Kybunpark (2016–2026)
- Location: St. Gallen, St. Gallen (Wahlkreis), Switzerland
- Coordinates: 47°24′30″N 9°18′23″E
- Owner: Stadion St.Gallen AG
- Capacity: 20,660

Construction
- Groundbreaking: 14 September 2005
- Opened: 2008
- Cost: 340 million CHF (2008)
- Architects: Bruno Clerici, St. Gallen; Bayer Partner AG, Architekten, St. Gallen; Philippe Joye & Associés Sàrl, Geneva

Tenants
- FC St. Gallen (2008–present); FC Wil (temporary); Switzerland national football team (selected matches)

The Sitterstadion (officially Berit Sitterstadion for sponsorship reasons), formerly known as the AFG Arena and Kybunpark, is a multi-purpose stadium in St. Gallen, Switzerland. Opened in 2008, it serves as the home ground for FC St. Gallen 1879, replacing the club's former home, the Espenmoos stadium. The venue has an official capacity of 20,660 for domestic matches and 17,317 for international fixtures.

From its opening in 2008 until 2016, the venue was named the AFG Arena after its sponsor, Arbonia-Forster-Gruppe. In July 2016, it was renamed Kybunpark. Following a sponsorship agreement with Berit Klinik, season ticket holders voted on a new name in November 2025. With a 62.6% turnout, fans chose "Berit Sitterstadion" (63.6% of votes) over "Berit Gallusstadion" (28.4%) and "Berit Säntisstadion" (8.0%). The venue was officially renamed Sitterstadion on 1 July 2026.

Prior to FC St. Gallen's first matches, the stadium hosted an international friendly between Switzerland and Liechtenstein on 30 May 2008 (a 3–0 win for Switzerland). FC St. Gallen played their first match at the new ground on 13 July 2008 in a friendly against Bayer 04 Leverkusen. The official inauguration was held on 5 July 2008, followed by the club's first competitive match on 26 July 2008, a 2–0 victory over Concordia Basel.

Starting in July 2012, second-division side FC Wil temporarily shared the venue while constructing a new stadium to satisfy Swiss Football League requirements. Beyond club football, the stadium regularly hosts international fixtures, including matches featuring national teams such as Brazil and Spain.

The roof of the stadium houses the largest solar-electric power plant in the city of St. Gallen. The initial installation in 2015 delivered a peak capacity of 633 kW, which was expanded in 2025 to reach a peak output of 1,205 kW.

== International matches ==
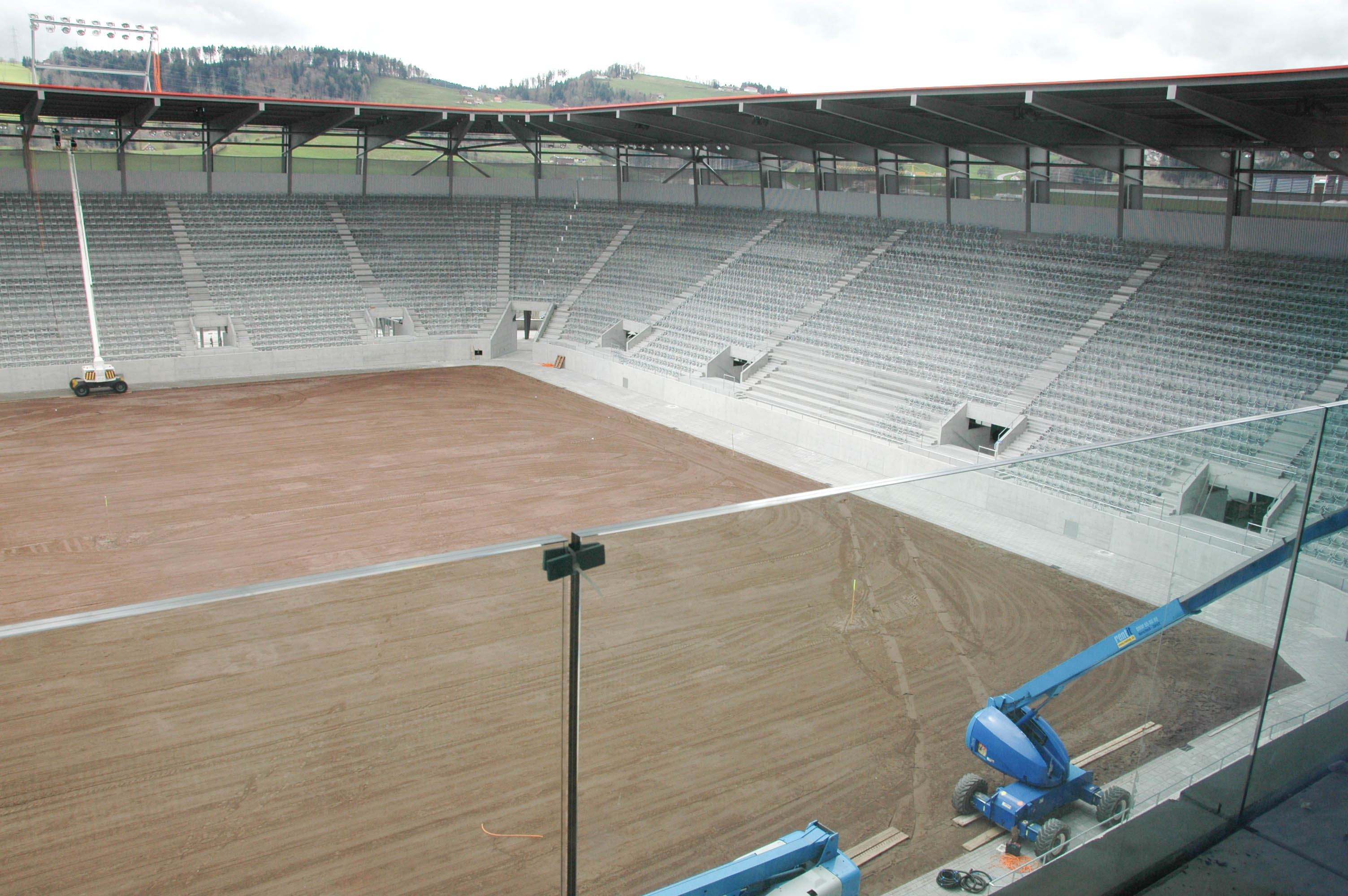
While under construction (2008)

Date		Result		Competition
30 May 2008	Switzerland	3–0	Liechtenstein	Friendly
11 October 2008	Switzerland	2–1	Latvia	2010 FIFA World Cup qualification
19 November 2008	Switzerland	1–0	Finland	Friendly
3 March 2010	Switzerland	1–3	Uruguay	Friendly
3 September 2010	Switzerland	0–0	Australia	Friendly
2 September 2011	Spain	3–2	Chile	Friendly
28 February 2012	Bosnia and Herzegovina	1–2	Brazil	Friendly
26 May 2012	Spain	2–0	Serbia	Friendly
14 November 2012	Chile	1–3	Serbia	Friendly
5 March 2014	Switzerland	2–2	Croatia	Friendly
15 November 2014	Switzerland	4–0	Lithuania	UEFA Euro 2016 qualifying
9 October 2015	Switzerland	7–0	San Marino	UEFA Euro 2016 qualifying
29 May 2016	Spain	3–1	Bosnia and Herzegovina	Friendly
31 August 2017	Switzerland	3–0	Andorra	2018 FIFA World Cup qualification
28 May 2018	Italy	2–1	Saudi Arabia	Friendly
3 June 2018	Saudi Arabia	0–3	Peru	Friendly
8 September 2018	Switzerland	6–0	Iceland	2018–19 UEFA Nations League
15 October 2019	Switzerland	1–0	Georgia	UEFA Euro 2020 qualifying
7 October 2020	Switzerland	1–2	Croatia	Friendly
28 March 2021	Switzerland	1–0	Lithuania	2022 FIFA World Cup qualification
31 March 2021	Switzerland	3–2	Finland	Friendly
30 May 2021	Switzerland	2–1	United States	Friendly
3 June 2021	Switzerland	7–0	Liechtenstein	Friendly
2 September 2021	Liechtenstein	0–2	Germany	2022 FIFA World Cup qualification
27 September 2022	Switzerland	2–1	Czech Republic	2022–23 UEFA Nations League A
15 October 2023	Switzerland	3–3	Belarus	UEFA Euro 2024 qualifying
8 June 2024	Switzerland	1–1	Austria	Friendly
15 October 2024	Switzerland	2–2	Denmark	2024–25 UEFA Nations League A
31 May 2026	Switzerland	4–1	Jordan	Friendly
16 November 2026	Switzerland	–	Scotland	2026–27 UEFA Nations League A

=== UEFA Women's Euro 2025 ===
The stadium was one of the venues for the UEFA Women's Euro 2025.

The following games were played at the stadium during the UEFA Women's Euro 2025:

Date	Time (CEST)	Team #1	Res.	Team #2	Round	Spectators
4 July 2025	21:00	Germany	2–0	Poland	Group C	15,972
9 July 2025	21:00	France	4–1	Wales	Group D	15,886
13 July 2025	21:00	England	6–1	Wales	Group D	15,953

== See also ==
- List of football stadiums in Switzerland
