= Alessio Besio =

Swiss footballer (born 2004)

Personal information
- Full name: Alessio Abilio Besio
- Date of birth: 18 March 2004 (age 22)
- Place of birth: St. Gallen, Switzerland
- Height: 1.86 m (6 ft 1 in)
- Position: Forward

Team information
- Current team: Sheffield Wednesday
- Number: 23

Youth career
- –2021: St. Gallen

Senior career*
| Years | Team | Apps | (Gls) |
| 2021–2023 | St. Gallen B | 11 | (11) |
| 2021–2023 | St. Gallen | 34 | (2) |
| 2023–2026 | SC Freiburg II | 28 | (6) |
| 2025–2026 | Sheffield Wednesday | 47 | (29) |
| 2026– | VfL Wolfsburg | 5 | (0) |

International career^{‡}
| 2021 | Switzerland U19 | 2 | (0) |
| 2023–2024 | Switzerland U20 | 4 | (0) |
- * Club domestic league appearances and goals as of 18 September 2026 ‡ National team caps and goals as of 9 September 2024

Alessio Abilio Besio (born 18 March 2004) is a Swiss professional footballer who plays as a forward for League One club Sheffield Wednesday F.C..

== Club career ==
On 30 May 2023, Besio agreed to join SC Freiburg II on a free transfer on 1 July 2023 following the end of his contract with St. Gallen.

On 18 June 2025, Besio was loaned by SC Verl in 3. Liga.

On 25 June 2026, Besio signed a four-season contract with VfL Wolfsburg.

== Personal life ==
Besio is the son of former professional footballer Claudio Besio.

== Career statistics ==
=== Club ===
As of 18 September 2026

Appearances and goals by club, season and competition
| Club | Season | League | | | Cup | | Continental | | Other | | Total | |
| Club | Season | Division | Apps | Goals | Apps | Goals | Apps | Goals | Apps | Goals | Apps | Goals |
|---|---|---|---|---|---|---|---|---|---|---|---|---|
| St. Gallen B | 2020–21 | Swiss 1. Liga | 3 | 2 | – | | – | | – | | 3 | 2 |
| St. Gallen B | 2022–23 | Swiss 1. Liga | 8 | 9 | – | | – | | – | | 8 | 9 |
| St. Gallen B | Total | | 11 | 11 | 0 | 0 | 0 | 0 | 0 | 0 | 11 | 11 |
| St. Gallen | 2020–21 | Swiss Super League | 1 | 1 | 0 | 0 | – | | 0 | 0 | 1 | 0 |
| St. Gallen | 2021–22 | Swiss Super League | 29 | 1 | 5 (Note: Appearances in the Swiss Cup) | 1 | – | | 0 | 0 | 34 | 2 |
| St. Gallen | 2022–23 | Swiss Super League | 4 | 0 | 1 | 0 | – | | – | | 5 | 0 |
| St. Gallen | Total | | 34 | 2 | 6 | 1 | 0 | 0 | 0 | 0 | 40 | 3 |
| SC Freiburg II | 2024–25 | 3. Liga | 28 | 6 | – | | – | | – | | 28 | 6 |
| SC Verl (loan) | 2025–26 | 3. Liga | 32 | 11 | – | | – | | 4 (Note: Appearance in Westphalia Cup) | 2 | 36 | 13 |
| VfL Wolfsburg | 2026–27 | 2. Bundesliga | 5 | 0 | 1 | 0 | – | | – | | 6 | 0 |
| Career total | | | 110 | 30 | 7 | 1 | 0 | 0 | 4 | 2 | 121 | 33 |
