= 2024–25 FC Lugano season =

FC Lugano
2024–25 season
- Manager: Mattia Croci-Torti
- Stadium: Cornaredo Stadium
- Swiss Super League: 4th
- Swiss Cup: Second round
- UEFA Champions League: Second qualifying round
- UEFA Europa League: Play-off round
- UEFA Conference League: League phase
- Top goalscorer: League: Ignacio Aliseda; Kacper Przybyłko; Renato Steffen (3 each); All: Kacper Przybyłko; Renato Steffen (6 each)
Home colours	Away colours
- All statistics correct as of 24 October 2024.

The 2024–25 season is the 117th season in the history of FC Lugano, and the club's 10th consecutive season in Swiss Super League. In addition to the domestic league, the team is scheduled to participate in the Swiss Cup and the UEFA Champions League as 2023–24 Super League runner-up.

== Transfers ==
=== In ===
Pos.	Player	Transferred from	Fee	Date	Source
DF	(Germany) Antonios Papadopoulos	(Germany) Borussia Dortmund	Free	1 July 2024	
MF	(Canada) Zachary Brault-Guillard	Free agent		1 July 2024	
DF	(Italy) Mattia Zanotti	(Italy) Inter Milan	Undisclosed	13 July 2024	
FW	(Greece) Georgios Koutsias	(United States) Chicago Fire	Loan	1 January 2025	

=== Out ===
Pos.	Player	Transferred to	Fee	Date	Source
DF	(Kosovo) Kreshnik Hajrizi	(Poland) Widzew Łódź	End of contract	1 July 2024	
GK	(Switzerland) Serif Berbic	(Switzerland) Bellinzona	Loan	17 July 2024	
MF	(Nigeria) Chinwendu Johan Nkama	(Switzerland) Bellinzona	Loan	17 July 2024	
FW	(Slovenia) Žan Celar	(England) Queens Park Rangers	Undisclosed	19 July 2024	

== Friendlies ==
=== Pre-season ===
29 June 2024 Friendly	Lugano (Switzerland)	2–0	(Switzerland) Stade Nyonnais	Caslano
11:00	Mahou 20'; Aliseda 86'	Report		Stadium: Centro Sportivo Roque Maspoli

3 July 2024 Friendly	Bellinzona (Switzerland)	1–5	(Switzerland) Lugano	Sementina
17:30	Nivokazi 11'		Przybyłko 9'; Doumbia 24'; Bottani 38'; Bislimi 62'; Aliseda 70'

6 July 2024 Friendly	Lugano (Switzerland)	0–1	(Switzerland) Aarau	Caslano
14:00		Report	Dickenmann 73'	Stadium: Centro Sportivo Roque Maspoli

13 July 2024 Friendly	Lugano (Switzerland)	3–1	(Italy) Parma	Lugano
19:00	Aliseda 2' (pen.); Cimignani 14'; Mahou 72'	Report	Partipilo 90+1'	Stadium: Cornaredo Stadium; Attendance: 2,748; Referee: Mirel Turkes

17 July 2024 Friendly	Inter Milan (Italy)	3–2	(Switzerland) Lugano	Appiano Gentile, Italy
18:30	Correa 11'; Taremi 50' (pen.), 58'		Przybyłko 21', 27'	Stadium: Angelo Moratti Sports Centre

== Competitions ==
=== Overall record ===
Competition	First match	Last match	Starting round	Final position	Record							
Competition	First match	Last match	Starting round	Final position	Pld	W	D	L	GF	GA	GD	Win %
Swiss Super League	20 July 2024		Matchday 1		3	3	0	0	7	3	+4	100.00
Swiss Cup	18 August 2024				0	0	0	0	0	0	+0	—
UEFA Champions League	23–24 July 2024	30 July 2024	Second qualifying round	Second qualifying round	2	0	0	2	4	6	−2	0.00
UEFA Europa League	8 August 2024		Third qualifying round		0	0	0	0	0	0	+0	—
Total					5	3	0	2	11	9	+2	60.00

Last updated: 3 August 2024
Source: Soccerway

=== Swiss Super League ===
==== League table ====
Pos	Team	Pld	W	D	L	GF	GA	GD	Pts	Qualification or relegation (Note: Teams play each other three times (33 matches), before the league is split into two groups (the top six and the bottom six).)
2	Servette	38	17	12	9	64	55	+9	63	Qualification for the Champions League second qualifying round
3	Young Boys	38	17	10	11	60	49	+11	61	Qualification for the Europa League play-off round (Note: The 2024–25 Swiss Cup winner (Basel) qualifies for the Europa League play-off round. Since the cup winner finished in the top three, the remaining European berths were passed down to the next highest qualifying teams.)
4	Lugano	38	15	9	14	55	58	−3	54	Qualification for the Europa League second qualifying round
5	Lausanne-Sport	38	14	11	13	62	54	+8	53	Qualification for the Conference League second qualifying round
6	Luzern	38	14	10	14	66	64	+2	52	

Source: Swiss Super League
Rules for classification: 1) Points; 2) Goal difference; 3) Goals scored; 4) Head-to-head goal difference; 5) Head-to-head goals scored 6) Away goals scored; 7) Draw.

==== Results summary ====
Overall								Home						Away					
Pld	W	D	L	GF	GA	GD	Pts	W	D	L	GF	GA	GD	W	D	L	GF	GA	GD
20	10	5	5	35	28	+7	35	6	2	2	21	14	+7	4	3	3	14	14	0

Last updated: 25 January 2025.
Source: soccerway

==== Results by round ====
Round	1	2	3	4	5	6	7	8	9	10	11	12	13	14	15	16	17	18	19	20	21	22	23	24	25
Ground	H	A	H	H	A	H	A	H	A	A	H	A	H	A	H	A	A	H	H	A	H	A	H	H	A
Result	W	W	W	L	W	D	D	W	D	L	W	D	W	L	W	L	W	L	D	W					
Position	3	4	1	4	2	2	3	3	3	4	3	3	2	3	2	2	1	1	1	1					

Updated to match(es) played on 25 January 2025. Source:
A = Away; H = Home; W = Win; D = Draw; L = Loss

==== Matches ====
The match schedule was released on 18 June 2024.

20 July 2024 1	Lugano	2–1	Grasshopper	Lugano
18:00	Cimignani (yellow card) 22'; Mai (yellow card) 24'; Przybyłko 61'; Bislimi 90+2', (yellow card) 90+3'		Morandi 25' (pen.), (yellow card) 56'; Maurin (yellow card) 77'	Stadium: Cornaredo Stadium; Referee: Urs Schnyder

27 July 2024 2	Basel	1–2	Lugano	Basel
20:30	Leroy 50', (yellow card) 59'		Aliseda 8'; Hajdari (yellow card) 53'; Przybyłko 69'	Stadium: St. Jakob-Park; Attendance: 19,866; Referee: Lukas Fähndrich

3 August 2024 3	Lugano	3–1	Servette	Lugano
18:00	Belhadj Mahmoud 73'; Mazikou 78' (o.g.); Steffen 84'		Kutesa 61'	Stadium: Cornaredo Stadium; Attendance: 3,334; Referee: Lionel Tschudi

11 August 2024 4	Lugano	2–3	Luzern	Lugano
16:30	Mahou 3'; Vladi 43'; Papadopoulos (yellow card) 60'; Mai (yellow card) 70'	Report	Dorn 12' (yellow card) 61'; Ottiger (yellow card) 55'; Klidjé 74' 88'	Stadium: Cornaredo Stadium; Attendance: 3,341; Referee: (Switzerland) Alessandro Dudic

1 September 2024 6	Lugano	1–1	St. Gallen	Lugano
16:30 CET	Bottani (yellow card) 34'; Przybyłko 45+2'; Martim Marques (yellow card) 53'; Bislimi (yellow card) 84'	Report	Görtler 19'; Diaby (yellow card) 71'; Toma (yellow card) 84'	Stadium: Cornaredo Stadium; Attendance: 3,606; Referee: (Switzerland) Anojen Kanagasingam

18 September 2024 5	Lausanne-Sport	1–2	Lugano	Lausanne
19:30 CET	Okou (yellow card) 43'; Dussenne (yellow card) 45'; Diabaté 90+2'	Report	Poaty 39' (o.g.); Zanotti (yellow card) 45+1'; Doumbia (yellow card) 48'; Mai (yellow card) 56'; Hajdari (yellow card) 65'; Aliseda 77'	Stadium: Stade de la Tuilière; Attendance: 3,462; Referee: (Switzerland) Johannes von Mandach

22 September 2024 7	Sion	0–0	Lugano	Sion
16:30 CET		Report	Grgić (yellow card) 36'; Hajdari (yellow card) 49'; Cimignani (yellow card) 66'; Macek (yellow card) 90+3'	Stadium: Stade de Tourbillon; Attendance: 9,300; Referee: (Switzerland) Lukas Fähndrich

29 September 2024 8	Lugano	2–1	Winterthur	Lugano
16:30 CET	Papadopoulos (yellow card) 72'; Steffen 73' 81'	Report	Lekaj (yellow card) 56' (yellow-red card) 88'; Labinot Bajrami 58'; Durrer (yellow card) 85'	Stadium: Cornaredo Stadium; Attendance: 3,081; Referee: (Switzerland) Désirée Grundbacher

6 October 2024 9	Zürich	1–1	Lugano	Zürich
14:15 CET	Perea 35'; Condé (yellow card) 66'	Report	Aliseda 26'; Doumbia (yellow card) 51'; Zanotti (yellow card) 85'	Stadium: Stadion Letzigrund; Attendance: 14,393; Referee: (Switzerland) Alessandro Dudic

20 October 2024 10	Yverdon-Sport	2–0	Lugano	Yverdon-les-Bains
16:30 CET	Tijani (yellow card) 27'; Céspedes 45+4' (pen.); El Wafi 58' (o.g.)	Report	Bislimi (yellow card) 42'; Steffen (yellow card) 79'; Cimignani (yellow card) 88'	Stadium: Stade Municipal; Attendance: 2,100; Referee: (Switzerland) Désirée Grundbacher

27 October 2024 11	Lugano	2–0	Young Boys	Lugano
16:30 CET	Aliseda 18'; Grgić (yellow card) 24'; Belhadj Mahmoud 33'; Brault-Guillard (yellow card) 71'; Mai (yellow card) 85'	Report	Husić (yellow card) 36'; Athekame (yellow card) 81'; Łakomy (yellow card) 85'	Stadium: Cornaredo Stadium; Attendance: 3,248; Referee: (Switzerland) Lionel Tschudi

31 October 2024 12	Grasshopper	1–1	Lugano	Zürich
20:30 CET	Muci 30'; Bojang (yellow card) 36'; Lee Young-jun (yellow card) 68'; Verón Lupi (yellow card) 78'	Report	Daniel Dos Santos (yellow card) 17'; Aliseda 52'; Grgić (yellow card) 68'	Stadium: Stadion Letzigrund; Attendance: 3,641; Referee: (Switzerland) David Huwiler

3 November 2024 13	Lugano	2–0	Yverdon-Sport	Lugano
16:30 CET	Steffen 36'; Mahou (yellow card) 53'; Aliseda 72'	Report	Tijani (yellow card) 31'; Sauthier (yellow card) 74'	Stadium: Cornaredo Stadium; Attendance: 2,961; Referee: (Switzerland) Mirel Turkes

10 November 2024 14	Young Boys	2–1	Lugano	Bern
16:30 CET	Itten 19' (pen.); Elia (yellow card) 46'; Łakomy (yellow card) 65'; Hadjam (yellow card) 67'; Virginius 76'	Report	Bottani (yellow card) 19'; Valenzuela (yellow card) 24'; Grgić 33' (pen.); Bislimi (yellow card) 54'; Belhadj Mahmoud (yellow card) 67' (yellow-red card) 87'; Zanotti (yellow card) 86'; Papadopoulos (yellow card) 90+6'	Stadium: Stadion Wankdorf; Attendance: 27,972; Referee: (Switzerland) Stefan Horisberger

24 November 2024 15	Lugano	4–1	Zürich	Lugano
14:15 CET	Papadopoulos (yellow card) 8'; Steffen 22' 50'; Grgić 26' (pen.); Vladi 30'; Hajdari (yellow card) 67'	Report	Chouiar 9' (yellow card) 26'; Gómez (yellow card) 25'; Kryeziu (yellow card) 57'; Perea (red card) 62'	Stadium: Cornaredo Stadium; Attendance: 4,645; Referee: (Switzerland) Fedayi San

1 December 2024 16	Servette	3–0	Lugano	Lancy
16:30 CET	Kutesa (yellow card) 34'; Crivelli 55'; Mazikou (yellow card) 59'; Cognat (red card) 59'; Rouiller 82' 88'	Report	El Wafi (yellow card) 1'; Mai (yellow card) 10'; Doumbia (yellow card) 87'; Przybyłko (yellow card) 90'	Stadium: Stade de Genève; Attendance: 9,242; Referee: (Switzerland) Sven Wolfensberger

7 December 2024 17	Luzern	1–4	Lugano	Lucerne
20:30 CET	Spadanuda (yellow card) 20'; Stanković (yellow card) 34'; Rrudhani 76'	Report	Grgić 35' (pen.) (yellow card) 42'; Belhadj Mahmoud 38'; Papadopoulos (yellow card) 49'; Steffen 64' (pen.); Hajdari (yellow card) 76'; Bottani 90+8'	Stadium: Swissporarena; Attendance: 9,444; Referee: (Switzerland) Mirel Turkes

15 December 2024 18	Lugano	1–4	Lausanne-Sport	Lugano
16:30 CET	Steffen (yellow card) 21'; Hajdari (yellow card) 45+1'; Saipi (yellow card) 52'; Przybyłko 68' (yellow card) 90+4'	Report	Sanches 10'; Koindredi (yellow card) 44'; Dussenne 45+2' (pen.) (yellow card) 54' (goal) 85' (pen.); Okou (yellow card) 52'; Sène 90+5' (pen.)	Stadium: Cornaredo Stadium; Attendance: 3,592; Referee: (Switzerland) Nico Gianforte

19 January 2025 19	Lugano	2–2	Basel	Lugano
16:30 CET	Grgić 45+2' (pen.); Hajdari 53'; Steffen (yellow card) 57'; Brault-Guillard (yellow card) 90+2'	Report	Kevin Carlos 24'; Mendes (yellow card) 28'; Leroy (yellow card) 36'; Schmid (yellow card) 42'; Moussa Cissé (yellow card) 74'; Shaqiri 87' (pen.)	Stadium: Cornaredo Stadium; Attendance: 4,888; Referee: (Switzerland) Sven Wolfensberger

25 January 2025 20	Winterthur	2–3	Lugano	Winterthur
20:30 CET	Baroan 7' 36' (pen.); Zuffi (yellow card) 58'	Report	Papadopoulos (yellow card) 45+1'; Bislimi (yellow card) 48'; Cimignani 52' 63'; Koutsias 90+3'	Stadium: Stadion Schützenwiese; Attendance: 6,900; Referee: (Switzerland) Fedayi San

1 February 2025 21	Lugano	–	Sion	Lugano
18:00 CET				Stadium: Cornaredo Stadium

=== Swiss Cup ===
18 August 2024 First round	SC Brühl	1–7	Lugano	St. Gallen
15:00	Mergim Bajrami 5'	Report	Przybyłko 7' 10' (pen.) 49'; Martim Marques 24'; Mahou 29'; El Wafi 61'; Vladi 90+2'	Stadium: Paul-Grüninger-Stadion

14 September 2024 Second round	Rapperswil-Jona	1–3	Lugano	Rapperswil
17:00 CET	Tia (yellow card) 19'; Marchand (yellow card) 68'; Merlin Hadzi 78' (yellow card) 82'; Joseph Ambassa (yellow card) 90+2'	Report	Valenzuela 53'; Daniel Dos Santos 58'; Bottani 75'	Stadium: Stadion Grünfeld; Attendance: 1,652; Referee: (Switzerland) Mirel Turkes

4 December 2024 Round of 16	Yverdon-Sport	0–2	Lugano	Yverdon-les-Bains
20:30 CET	Ntelo (yellow card) 55'; Mauro Rodrigues (yellow card) 65'; Diop (yellow card) 74' (yellow-red card) 90+3'	Report	Zanotti (yellow card) 60' (goal) 83'; Belhadj Mahmoud 76'; Hajdari (yellow card) 79'; Bislimi (yellow card) 87'; Steffen (yellow card) 90+3'	Stadium: Stade Municipal; Attendance: 1,220; Referee: (Switzerland) Luca Cibelli

26 February 2025 Quarter-finals	Biel-Bienne	–	Lugano	Biel/Bienne
20:30 CET				Stadium: Tissot Arena

=== UEFA Champions League ===
==== Second qualifying round ====
23 July 2024 First leg	Lugano (Switzerland)	3–4	(Turkey) Fenerbahçe	Thun
20:30 UTC+2	El Wafi 4', (yellow card) 29'; Papadopoulos (yellow card) 59'; Bislimi 64'; Bottani (yellow card) 69'; Grgić (yellow card) 71'; Zanotti (yellow card) 77'; Valenzuela 90+4'	Report	Söyüncü (yellow card) 18'; Džeko 45+1' (pen.), 46', 67'; Tadić (yellow card) 45+3'; Oosterwolde (yellow card) 70'; Kadıoğlu 73'; Tosun (yellow card) 90+5'	Stadium: Stockhorn Arena; Referee: Tiago Martins (Portugal)

30 July 2024 Second leg	Fenerbahçe (Turkey)	2–1 (6–4 agg.)	(Switzerland) Lugano	Istanbul
20:00 UTC+3	Džeko 59', (yellow card) 86'; Szymański 90+3'	Report	Belhadj Mahmoud 7', (yellow card) 58'; Doumbia (yellow card) 55'; Aliseda (yellow card) 57'; Zanotti (yellow card) 79'	Stadium: Şükrü Saracoğlu Stadium; Referee: Robert Jones (England)

=== UEFA Europa League ===
==== Third qualifying round ====
8 August 2024 First leg	Partizan (Serbia)	0–1	(Switzerland) Lugano	Belgrade, Serbia
20:00	Ibrahim (yellow card) 29'	Report	Bislimi (yellow card) 35'; Zanotti 73'	Stadium: Partizan Stadium; Attendance: 3,163; Referee: (Netherlands) Sander van der Eijk

15 August 2024 Second leg	Lugano (Switzerland)	2–2 (3–2 agg.)	(Serbia) Partizan	Thun
20:30	Steffen 47' (yellow card) 114'; Hajdari (yellow card) 49' (yellow-red card) 87'; Valenzuela (yellow card) 104'; Belhadj Mahmoud 111' (yellow card) 112'; El Wafi (yellow card) 113'; Doumbia (yellow card) 120+3'	Report	Arriaga (yellow card) 17'; Ibrahim (yellow card) 33'; Zahid 44'; Marković 67'; Mujakić (yellow card) 69'	Stadium: Stockhorn Arena; Attendance: 2,268; Referee: (Spain) Ricardo de Burgos Bengoetxea

==== Play-off round ====
22 August 2024 First leg	Lugano (Switzerland)	3–3	(Turkey) Beşiktaş	Thun
20:30	Bislimi 34'; Doumbia (yellow card) 47'; Steffen 56'; Gabriel Paulista 63' (o.g.); Valenzuela (yellow card) 76'	Report	Gedson Fernandes 21' 51'; Ndour (yellow card) 45+1'; Al-Musrati 55' (yellow card) 84'	Stadium: Stockhorn Arena; Attendance: 5,270; Referee: (Denmark) Morten Krogh

29 August 2024 Second leg	Beşiktaş (Turkey)	5–1 (8–4 agg.)	(Switzerland) Lugano	Istanbul
21:00	Immobile 7' 71'; Gedson Fernandes (yellow card) 28' (goal) 65'; Kılıçsoy (yellow card) 43'; Topçu (yellow card) 61'; Rafa Silva 70'; Uçan 90+2'	Report	Valenzuela (yellow card) 5'; Vladi 59'; Bislimi (yellow card) 90+1'	Stadium: Beşiktaş Stadium; Attendance: 35,370; Referee: (Romania) Radu Petrescu

=== UEFA Conference League ===
3 October 2024 1	(Switzerland) Lugano	3–0	(Finland) HJK	Thun
21:00 CET	Hajdari (yellow card) 8'; Papadopoulos 34'; Martim Marques 56'; Daniel Dos Santos 90+1'	Report		Stadium: Stockhorn Arena; Attendance: 932; Referee: (Scotland) David Dickinson

24 October 2024 2	(Czech Republic) Mladá Boleslav	0–1	(Switzerland) Lugano	Mladá Boleslav
21:00 CET		Report	Steffen 38'; Hajdari (yellow card) 78'; Bottani (yellow card) 90+7'	Stadium: Lokotrans Aréna; Attendance: 2,836; Referee: (Cyprus) Chrysovalantis Theouli

7 November 2024 3	(Serbia) TSC	4–1	(Switzerland) Lugano	Bačka Topola
18:45 CET	Stanić 4' 62'; Radin (yellow card) 46'; Ćirković (yellow card) 56'; Pantović 59' 83'; Stefan Jovanović (yellow card) 70'; Sós (yellow card) 89'	Report	Belhadj Mahmoud (yellow card) 57' (goal) 61'; Grgić (yellow card) 62'; Hajdari (yellow card) 69'; Bottani (red card) 89'	Stadium: TSC Arena; Attendance: 8,584; Referee: (Denmark) Jacob Sundberg

28 November 2024 4	(Switzerland) Lugano	2–0	(Belgium) Gent	Thun
21:00 CET	Mahou 6' (yellow card) 71'; Valenzuela (yellow card) 59'; Saipi (yellow card) 69'; Bislimi (yellow card) 73'; Doumbia 86'	Report	Guðjohnsen (yellow card) 31'; Torunarigha (yellow card) 49'; Watanabe (yellow card) 76'; Dean (yellow card) 80'	Stadium: Stockhorn Arena; Attendance: 2,672; Referee: (Albania) Enea Jorgji

12 December 2024 5	(Poland) Legia Warsaw	1–2	(Switzerland) Lugano	Warsaw
18:45 CET	Morishita 11' (yellow card) 90+7'; Wszołek (yellow card) 28'; Kapustka (yellow card) 83'; Marc Gual (yellow card) 90'; Pankov (yellow card) 90+1' (yellow-red card) 90+1'; Luquinhas (yellow card) 90+4'	Report	Bislimi (yellow card) 23'; Bottani 40'; Hajdari 73'; Zanotti (yellow card) 90+4'; Steffen (yellow card) 90+6'	Stadium: Polish Army Stadium; Attendance: 21,767; Referee: (Spain) Juan Martínez Munuera

19 December 2024 6	(Switzerland) Lugano	2–2	(Cyprus) Pafos	Thun
21:00 CET	Belhadj Mahmoud 7' (yellow card) 90+1'; Bottani 33' (yellow card) 45+1'; Bislimi (yellow card) 70'; Grgić (yellow card) 90+4'; Przybyłko (yellow card) 90+6'	Report	Saipi 4' (o.g.); Tanković (yellow card) 26'; João Correia (yellow card) 29'; Luckassen (yellow card) 74'; David Goldar 90+5'; Domingos Quina (yellow card) 90+6'	Stadium: Stockhorn Arena; Attendance: 1,795; Referee: (Serbia) Nenad Minaković
