= 2023–24 FC Lugano season =

FC Lugano
2023–24 season
- Manager: Mattia Croci-Torti
- Stadium: Cornaredo Stadium
- Swiss Super League: 2nd
- Swiss Cup: Runners-up
- UEFA Europa League: Play-off round
- UEFA Europa Conference League: Group stage
- Top goalscorer: League: Žan Celar (6); All: Žan Celar (10)
- Biggest win: FC Gunzwil 0–7 Lugano

The 2023–24 season was FC Lugano's 116th season in existence and ninth consecutive in the Swiss Super League. They also competed in the Swiss Cup, UEFA Europa League and UEFA Europa Conference League.

== Players ==
=== First-team squad ===
As of 6 January 2024

Note: Flags indicate national team as defined under FIFA eligibility rules; some limited exceptions apply. Players may hold more than one non-FIFA nationality.

No.	Pos.	Nation	Player
1	GK	SUI	Amir Saipi
4	DF	KOS	Kreshnik Hajrizi
5	DF	SUI	Albian Hajdari
6	DF	ECU	Jhon Espinoza
7	MF	CZE	Roman Macek
8	MF	SUI	Adrian Durrer
9	FW	SLO	Žan Celar
10	FW	SUI	Mattia Bottani
11	FW	SUI	Renato Steffen
13	GK	SUI	Serif Berbic
14	MF	URU	Jonathan Sabbatini (captain)
15	GK	GRE	Fotis Pseftis
16	MF	SUI	Anto Grgić
17	DF	GER	Lars Lukas Mai

No.	Pos.	Nation	Player
18	MF	FRA	Hicham Mahou
19	FW	KOS	Shkelqim Vladi
21	MF	FRA	Yanis Cimignani
22	DF	MAR	Ayman El Wafi
23	DF	ARG	Milton Valenzuela
25	MF	SUI	Uran Bislimi
26	DF	POR	Martim Marques
27	FW	SUI	Boris Babic
28	MF	SLO	Abel Marc
29	MF	TUN	Mohamed Belhadj Mahmoud
31	FW	ARG	Ignacio Aliseda
34	DF	SUI	Allan Arigoni
41	DF	SUI	Noah De Queiroz
58	GK	NGR	Sebastian Osigwe

=== Out on loan ===
Note: Flags indicate national team as defined under FIFA eligibility rules; some limited exceptions apply. Players may hold more than one non-FIFA nationality.

No.	Pos.	Nation	Player
—	GK	SUI	Attilio Morosoli (at Bellinzona until 31 December 2023)
—	MF	CIV	Ousmane Doumbia (at Chicago Fire until 31 December 2023)

No.	Pos.	Nation	Player
—	MF	SUI	Maren Haile-Selassie (at Chicago Fire until 31 December 2023)
—	FW	SUI	Nikolas Muci (at Wil until 30 June 2024)

== Transfers ==
=== In ===
Pos.	Player	Transferred from	Fee	Date	Source
MF	(France) Anto Grgić	(Switzerland) Sion	Free	1 July 2023	
MF	(France) Yanis Cimignani	(France) Ajaccio	Free	1 July 2023	

=== Out ===
Pos.	Player	Transferred to	Fee	Date	Source
DF	(Switzerland) Fabio Daprelà	(Switzerland) Zürich	Free	1 July 2023	
FW	(Algeria) Mohamed El Amine Amoura	(Belgium) Union Saint-Gilloise	€4,000,000	18 August 2023	
MF	(Switzerland) Maren Haile-Selassie	(United States) Chicago Fire		31 December 2023	

== Pre-season and friendlies ==
Win Draw Loss Fixtures

29 June 2023 Friendly	Bellinzona (Switzerland)	2–3	(Switzerland) Lugano
17:30

4 July 2023 Friendly	SpVgg Unterhaching (Germany)	1–1	(Switzerland) Lugano	Malles Venosta, Italy
17:30				Stadium: Stadio Malles Venosta

12 July 2023 Friendly	Lugano (Switzerland)	5–1	(Switzerland) FC Paradiso
18:30

9 January 2024 Friendly	Lugano (Switzerland)	0-4	(Belgium) Genk	Spain
11:00		Report		Stadium: Melia Villaitana Football Center

12 January 2024 Friendly	Lugano (Switzerland)	1-0	(Switzerland) FC Schaffhausen	Lugano
15:00 CET		Report		Stadium: Cornaredo Stadium

17 January 2024 Friendly	Lugano (Switzerland)	1-1	(Switzerland) FC Paradiso	Biasca
14:00 CET		Report		Stadium: Campo Sportivo "Al Vallone"

== Competitions ==
=== Overall record ===
Competition	First match	Last match	Starting round	Final position	Record							
Competition	First match	Last match	Starting round	Final position	Pld	W	D	L	GF	GA	GD	Win %
Swiss Super League	26 July 2023	May 2024	Matchday 1		18	8	2	8	32	30	+2	44.44
Swiss Cup	19 August 2023		Round 1		3	3	0	0	14	0	+14	100.00
UEFA Europa League	24 August 2023	31 August 2023	Play-off round	Play-off round	2	0	0	2	0	3	−3	0.00
UEFA Europa Conference League	21 September 2023	14 December 2023	Group stage	Group stage	6	1	1	4	6	14	−8	16.67
Total					29	12	3	14	52	47	+5	41.38

Last updated: 17 December 2023
Source: Soccerway

=== Swiss Super League ===
==== League table ====
Pos	Team	Pld	W	D	L	GF	GA	GD	Pts	Qualification or relegation (Note: Teams played each other three times (33 matches), before the league was split into two groups (the top six and the bottom six).)
1	Young Boys (C)	38	23	8	7	76	34	+42	77	Qualification for the Champions League play-off round
2	Lugano	38	20	5	13	67	51	+16	65	Qualification for the Champions League second qualifying round
3	Servette	38	18	10	10	59	43	+16	64	Qualification for the Europa League third qualifying round (Note: Servette qualified for the Europa League third qualifying round as the 2023–24 Swiss Cup winners.)
4	Zürich	38	16	12	10	53	41	+12	60	Qualification for the Conference League second qualifying round
5	St. Gallen	38	16	9	13	60	51	+9	57	Qualification for the Conference League second qualifying round

Source: Swiss Super League
Rules for classification: 1) Points; 2) Goal difference; 3) Goals scored; 4) Head-to-head goal difference; 5) Head-to-head goals scored 6) Away goals scored; 7) Draw.
(C) Champions

==== Results summary ====
Overall								Home						Away					
Pld	W	D	L	GF	GA	GD	Pts	W	D	L	GF	GA	GD	W	D	L	GF	GA	GD
37	20	5	12	67	49	+18	65	10	3	5	31	20	+11	10	2	7	36	29	+7

Last updated: 20 May 2024.

==== Results by round ====
Round	1	2	3	4	5	6	7	8	9	10	11	12	13	14	15	16	17	18	19	20	21	22	23	24	25	26	27	28	29	30	31	32	33	34	35	36	37	38
Ground	A	H	A	H	H	A	A	H	A	H	A	H	A	H	A	H	H	A	H	A	H	A	H	A	H	A	A	H	A	H	A	A	H	H	A	H	A	H
Result	W	W	L	W	L	L	L	W	W	L	L	D	L	L	W	W	W	D	L	W	D	W	D	L	W	W	W	W	W	W	D	W	W	L	W	W	L	
Position	1	1	3	2	3	5	7	5	3	4	6	6	6	8	7	6	5	5	5	5	6	6	5	5	5	4	3	3	3	3	3	3	3	3	2	2	2	

Updated to match(es) played on 20 May 2024. Source:
A = Away; H = Home; W = Win; D = Draw; L = Loss; P = Postponed

==== Matches ====
The league fixtures were unveiled on 21 June 2023.

26 July 2023 1	Stade Lausanne Ouchy	0–3	Lugano	Lausanne
20:30 CEST (UTC+2)	Akichi (yellow card) 40'; Abdallah (yellow card) 84'	Report	Steffen 9'; Celar 48'; Amoura 63'; Belhadj Mahmoud (yellow card) 89'	Stadium: Stade Olympique de la Pontaise; Attendance: 1,784; Referee: (Switzerland) Alessandro Dudic

29 July 2023 2	Lugano	1–0	St. Gallen	Lugano
18:00 CEST (UTC+2)	Valenzuela (yellow card) 28'; Celar 70'; Hajdari (yellow card) 71'; Bottani (yellow card) 90+1'	Report	Jordi Quintillà (yellow card) 16'; Zanotti (yellow card) 52'; Diaby (yellow card) 75'; van der Venne (yellow card) 89'; Karlen (yellow card) 90+1'	Stadium: Cornaredo Stadium; Attendance: 4,902; Referee: (Switzerland) Sven Wolfensberger

5 August 2023 3	Zürich	3–0	Lugano	Zürich
20:30 CEST (UTC+2)	Afriyie 68' (yellow card) 71' (goal) 76'; Okita 80'; Daprelà (yellow card) 90'	Report		Stadium: Letzigrund; Attendance: 13,735; Referee: (Switzerland) Sandro Schärer

13 August 2023 4	Lugano	6–1	Yverdon-Sport	Lugano
16:30 CEST (UTC+2)	Sabbatini 24'; Valenzuela (yellow card) 32' (goal) 65'; Vladi 34'; Hajdari (yellow card) 37'; Bottani 41' (yellow card) 42'; Sauthier 51' (o.g.); Bislimi (yellow card) 59'; Steffen 79'	Report	Kevin Carlos 8'; Tijani (yellow card) 81' (yellow-red card) 81'; Mauro Rodrigues (yellow card) 86'	Stadium: Cornaredo Stadium; Attendance: 3,144; Referee: (Switzerland) Mirel Turkes

3 September 2023 6	Luzern	3–2	Lugano	Lucerne
16:30 CEST (UTC+2)	Dorn (yellow card) 3'; Meyer 19' 22' (pen.); Beloko (yellow card) 64' (yellow-red card) 76'; Villiger 74'	Report	Espinoza 4' (red card) 71'; Vladi (yellow card) 13' (goal) 90+6'; Bislimi (yellow card) 33'; El Wafi (yellow card) 72'; Grgić (yellow card) 90+8'	Stadium: Swissporarena; Attendance: 12,000; Referee: (Switzerland) Lukas Fähndrich

24 September 2023 7	Young Boys	4–1	Lugano	Bern
16:30 CEST (UTC+2)	Nsame 19' 37'; Joël Monteiro 32'; Lustenberger 57'; Janko (yellow card) 90'	Report	Espinoza (yellow card) 9'; Hajdari (yellow card) 66'; Cimignani 80'	Stadium: Stadion Wankdorf; Attendance: 27,805; Referee: (Switzerland) Luca Cibelli

27 September 2023 8	Lugano	2–1	Lausanne-Sport	Lugano
20:30 CEST (UTC+2)	Celar 34'; Cimignani 73'	Report	Husic (yellow card) 23'; Dussenne (yellow card) 37'; Sanches 48' (yellow card) 60'	Stadium: Cornaredo Stadium; Attendance: 2,474; Referee: (Switzerland) Nico Gianforte

30 September 2023 9	Winterthur	2–3	Lugano	Winterthur
18:00 CEST (UTC+2)	Stillhart (yellow card) 31'; Schättin (yellow card) 62'; Burkart 68'; Jankewitz (yellow card) 85'; Buess 90+3'	Report	Vladi 22'; Hajdari (yellow card) 33'; Macek (yellow card) 49'; Cimignani (yellow card) 62'; Martim Marques 70'; Belhadj Mahmoud 73'; Steffen (yellow card) 83'; Sabbatini (yellow card) 89'	Stadium: Stadion Schützenwiese; Attendance: 7,850; Referee: (Switzerland) Stefan Horisberger

8 October 2023 10	Lugano	0–1	Servette	Lugano
14:15 CET (UTC+1)	Mai (yellow card) 84'	Report	Crivelli 38'; Mazikou (yellow card) 41'	Stadium: Cornaredo Stadium; Attendance: 3,523; Referee: (Switzerland) Sandro Schärer

22 October 2023 11	Grasshopper Club Zürich	2–1	Lugano	Zürich
16:30 CET (UTC+1)	Morandi (yellow card) 50'; Schürpf 71'; Corbeanu (yellow card) 81'; Ndenge 90+3'	Report	Mai (yellow card) 73'; Hajdari 83'; Bislimi (yellow card) 90+2'	Stadium: Letzigrund; Attendance: 6,102; Referee: (Switzerland) Esther Staubli

29 October 2023 12	Lugano	1–1	Young Boys	Lugano
16:30 CET (UTC+1)	Martim Marques (yellow card) 38'; Cimignani (yellow card) 70' (goal) 78'; Belhadj Mahmoud (yellow card) 79'	Report	Amenda (yellow card) 13'; Ugrinić 58' (yellow card) 90+5'; Ganvoula (yellow card) 90+5'	Stadium: Cornaredo Stadium; Attendance: 3,556; Referee: (Switzerland) Stefan Horisberger

4 November 2023 13	Lausanne-Sport	3–1	Lugano	Lausanne
18:00 CET (UTC+1)	Sanches (yellow card) 27'; Sène (yellow card) 32'; Kalu 71'; Labeau 80'; Schwizer 90+4'	Report	Hajrizi (yellow card) 26'; Martim Marques (yellow card) 44' (yellow-red card) 70'; Sabbatini 75'; Macek (yellow card) 79'	Stadium: Stade de la Tuilière; Attendance: 4,212; Referee: (Switzerland) Esther Staubli

12 November 2023 14	Lugano	0–3	Zürich	Lugano
16:30 CET (UTC+1)		Report	Okita 14'; Kamberi 33'; Marchesano 88'	Stadium: Cornaredo Stadium; Attendance: 4,636; Referee: (Switzerland) Urs Schnyder

25 November 2023 15	Yverdon-Sport	0–5	Lugano	Yverdon-les-Bains
20:30 CET (UTC+1)	Tasar (yellow card) 45+1'; Alves (yellow card) 90'	Report	Hajrizi (yellow card) 22' (goal) 74'; Hajdari (yellow card) 45+1' (goal) 57'; Celar 59' 62'; Babic 90+1'	Stadium: Stade Municipal; Attendance: 2,000; Referee: (Switzerland) Mirel Turkes

3 December 2023 16	Lugano	1–0	Luzern	Lugano
16:30 CET (UTC+1)	Mahou (yellow card) 43'; Belhadj Mahmoud 50'; Sabbatini (yellow card) 58'; Celar (yellow card) 90+3'	Report	Frýdek (yellow card) 61'	Stadium: Cornaredo Stadium; Attendance: 2,905; Referee: (Switzerland) Stefan Horisberger

6 December 2023 5	Lugano	1–3	Basel	Lugano
20:30 CET (UTC+1)	Macek (yellow card) 25' (goal) 54'; Steffen (yellow card) 49'; Vladi (yellow card) 77'; Saipi (yellow card) 89'; Hajrizi (yellow card) 89'	Report	Schmid (yellow card) 18'; Rüegg (yellow card) 21'; Dubasin 29'; Jovanović 61'; Salvi (yellow card) 86'; Renato Veiga (yellow card) 89'; Avdullahu (yellow card) 89'; Beney 90+2'	Stadium: Cornaredo Stadium; Attendance: 3,158; Referee: (Switzerland) Alessandro Dudic

10 December 2023 17	Lugano	2–1	Winterthur	Lugano
14:15 CET (UTC+1)	Belhadj Mahmoud (yellow card) 16'; Hajdari (yellow card) 35'; Steffen 39'; Arigoni (yellow card) 74'; Celar 83'; Hajrizi (yellow card) 90+3'; Bislimi (yellow card) 90+4'	Report	Burkart (yellow card) 82'; Schättin (yellow card) 83'; Ballet 90+2'; Ramizi (yellow card) 90+7'	Stadium: Cornaredo Stadium; Attendance: 2,701; Referee: (Switzerland) Sven Wolfensberger

17 December 2023 18	Servette	2–2	Lugano	Lancy
16:30 CET (UTC+1)	Bedia 27' (pen.) 40'; Ondoua (yellow card) 29' (yellow-red card) 83'; Diba (yellow card) 89'	Report	Steffen (yellow card) 26'; Macek (yellow card) 31'; Vladi 53'; Chinwendu Johan Nkama (red card) 67'; El Wafi 84'; Sabbatini (yellow card) 90+2'	Stadium: Stade de Genève; Attendance: 2,873; Referee: (Switzerland) Luca Cibelli

21 January 2024 19	Lugano	2–3	Stade Lausanne Ouchy	Lugano
16:30 CET (UTC+1)	Bislimi 61' 82'; Mahou (yellow card) 66'; Cimignani (yellow card) 79'; Vladi (yellow card) 90+3'	Report	Kyeremateng 8' (pen.); Mischa Eberhard 17' (yellow card) 45+1'; Ismaël Gharbi 35' (red card) 55'; Akichi (yellow card) 84'; Mergim Qarri (yellow card) 90+8'	Stadium: Cornaredo Stadium; Attendance: 2,111; Referee: (Switzerland) Sven Wolfensberger

28 January 2024 20	St. Gallen	1–4	Lugano	St. Gallen
14:15 CET (UTC+1)	Görtler (red card) 5'; Schubert (yellow card) 51'; Stevanović 68'; Ati-Zigi (yellow card) 90+3'; Mambimbi (yellow card) 90+4'	Report	Sabbatini 45' (yellow card) 71'; El Wafi (yellow card) 47'; Celar 73' 90+3'; Vladi (yellow card) 77'; Bislimi 80'; Saipi (yellow card) 90+1'	Stadium: Kybunpark; Attendance: 17,179; Referee: (Switzerland) Lukas Fähndrich

31 January 2024 21	Lugano	0–0	Grasshopper Club Zürich	Lugano
20:30 CET (UTC+1)		Report	Momoh (yellow card) 2'; Abrashi (yellow card) 35'; Abels (yellow card) 64'	Stadium: Cornaredo Stadium; Attendance: 2,362; Referee: (Switzerland) Johannes von Mandach

3 February 2024 22	Basel	0–1	Lugano	Basel
20:30 CET (UTC+1)	Vouilloz (yellow card) 64'	Report	Steffen 69'; Valenzuela (yellow card) 72'; Bislimi (yellow card) 81'; Celar (yellow card) 89'	Stadium: St. Jakob-Park; Attendance: 20,561; Referee: (Switzerland) Fedayi San

10 February 2024 23	Lugano	3–3	Young Boys	Lugano
20:30 CET (UTC+1)	Bislimi 45+1'; Hajrizi 56'; Celar 80' (pen.); Grgić (yellow card) 82'; Espinoza (yellow card) 87'	Report	Colley 8'; von Ballmoos (yellow card) 45+1'; Mvuka 52'; Camara (yellow card) 60'; Ugrinić 62'	Stadium: Cornaredo Stadium; Attendance: 2,824; Referee: (Switzerland) Nico Gianforte

18 February 2024 24	Servette	2–1	Lugano	Lancy
16:30 CET (UTC+1)	Mazikou (yellow card) 60'; Bronn (yellow card) 78'; Stevanović 83'; Bolla 89' (pen.); Magnin (yellow card) 90+4'	Report	Belhadj Mahmoud 11'; Mahou (yellow card) 18'; Sabbatini (yellow card) 43'; Grgić (red card) 75'	Stadium: Stade de Genève; Attendance: 6,438; Referee: (Switzerland) Stefan Horisberger

25 February 2024 25	Lugano	2–0	Zürich	Lugano
14:15 CET (UTC+1)	Belhadj Mahmoud (yellow card) 19'; Vladi 25' (pen.); Celar 68'; Mahou (yellow card) 82'	Report	Kryeziu (yellow card) 24'; Cheveyo Tsawa (yellow card) 29'; Rodrigo Conceição (yellow card) 33'	Stadium: Cornaredo Stadium; Attendance: 4,151; Referee: (Switzerland) Sven Wolfensberger

3 March 2024 26	Luzern	0–1	Lugano	Lucerne
14:15 CET (UTC+1)	Grbić (yellow card) 51'; Kadák (yellow card) 52'; Jashari (yellow card) 62'; Ulrich (yellow card) 90+2'	Report	Vladi (yellow card) 34' (goal) 40'; Valenzuela (yellow card) 58'; Sabbatini (yellow card) 74'; Mai (yellow card) 75'	Stadium: Swissporarena; Attendance: 13,442; Referee: (Switzerland) Anojen Kanagasingam

9 March 2024 27	St. Gallen	2–3	Lugano	St. Gallen
20:30 CET (UTC+1)	Akolo 3'; Guebbels 13'; Witzig (yellow card) 90+6'	Report	Celar 10'; Grgić (yellow card) 23'; Saipi (yellow card) 45+2'; Belhadj Mahmoud 47'; Bislimi 80'	Stadium: Kybunpark; Attendance: 16,790; Referee: (Switzerland) Fedayi San

16 March 2024 28	Lugano	2–0	Yverdon-Sport	Lugano
20:30 CET (UTC+1)	El Wafi (yellow card) 17'; Belhadj Mahmoud 37'; Hajrizi (yellow card) 50'; Valenzuela 58'	Report	Kamenović (yellow card) 35'; Mahious (yellow card) 70'; Christian Marques (yellow card) 86'	Stadium: Cornaredo Stadium; Attendance: 3,821; Referee: (Switzerland) Mirel Turkes

30 March 2024 29	Stade Lausanne Ouchy	1–3	Lugano	Lausanne
18:00 CET (UTC+1)	Diakité (red card) 44'; Abdallah (yellow card) 67'; Damașcan 90' (pen.)	Report	Hajdari (yellow card) 21'; Grgić (yellow card) 52'; Doumbia 76'; Celar 79'; Przybyłko 86'	Stadium: Stade Olympique de la Pontaise; Attendance: 1,921; Referee: (Switzerland) Luca Cibelli

2 April 2024 30	Lugano	2–0	Basel	Lugano
20:30 CET (UTC+1)	Steffen (yellow card) 41' (goal) 69'; Hajdari 44'; Macek (yellow card) 52'	Report	Dräger (yellow card) 55'; Kacuri (yellow card) 55'; Augustin (yellow card) 64'; Kayombo (yellow card) 66'; Frei (yellow card) 67'	Stadium: Cornaredo Stadium; Attendance: 3,975; Referee: (Switzerland) Alessandro Dudic

6 April 2024 31	Winterthur	2–2	Lugano	Winterthur
18:00 CET (UTC+1)	Schneider 63'; Arnold (yellow card) 82'; Turkeš 84'	Report	Cimignani 48'; Grgić (yellow card) 58'; Espinoza 83'; Hajdari (yellow card) 87'	Stadium: Stadion Schützenwiese; Attendance: 8,100; Referee: (Switzerland) Johannes von Mandach

13 April 2024 32	Grasshopper	0–1	Lugano	Zürich
18:00 CET (UTC+1)	Morandi (yellow card) 64'; Paskotši (yellow card) 79'	Report	Celar 10' (pen.) (yellow card) 40'; El Wafi (yellow card) 47'; Belhadj Mahmoud (red card) 76'; Valenzuela (yellow card) 89'; Espinoza (yellow card) 90+6'	Stadium: Letzigrund; Attendance: 5,449; Referee: (Switzerland) Mirel Turkes

20 April 2024 33	Lugano	2–0	Lausanne-Sport	Lugano
20:30 CET (UTC+1)	Bislimi 4'; Grgić 10' (yellow card) 76'; Doumbia (yellow card) 75'	Report	Custodio (yellow card) 67'; Pafundi (yellow card) 67'; Szalai (yellow card) 78'; Dussenne (yellow card) 90+5'	Stadium: Cornaredo Stadium; Attendance: 3,653; Referee: (Switzerland) Luca Cibelli

=== Swiss Cup ===
19 August 2023 Round 1	FC Gunzwil	0–7	Lugano	Gunzwil
18:00 CEST (UTC+2)		Report	Martim Marques 4'; Vladi 6'; Celar 61' (pen.); Macek 70'; Steffen 89' 90+4'; Sabbatini 90+1'	Stadium: Sportplatz Linden; Referee: (Switzerland) David Schärli

16 September 2023 Round 2	Lancy FC	0–3	Lugano	Lancy
16:00 CEST (UTC+2)	Isaac Ibongo (yellow card) 62'	Report	Celar 45+2' 80'; Bottani 90+2'	Stadium: Stade de Marignac; Attendance: 500; Referee: (Switzerland) Anojen Kanagasingam

1 November 2023 Round of 16	Lausanne-Sport	0–4	Lugano	Lausanne
20:30 CET (UTC+1)	Giger (red card) 5'; Dussenne (yellow card) 33'	Report	Vladi 22'; Steffen 33' (pen.); Bislimi 56'; Arigoni (yellow card) 57'; Kukuruzović 90+3' (o.g.)	Stadium: Stade de la Tuilière; Attendance: 3,026; Referee: (Switzerland) Urs Schnyder

=== UEFA Europa League ===
==== Play-off round ====
24 August 2024 First leg	Union Saint-Gilloise (Belgium)	2–0	(Switzerland) Lugano	Brussels, Belgium (Note: Union Saint-Gilloise played their home match at Constant Vanden Stock Stadium, Brussels, instead of their regular stadium, Joseph Marien Stadium, Brussels, which did not meet UEFA requirements.)
20:30 CEST (UTC+2)	Eckert 8', (yellow card) 42'; Mac Allister (yellow card) 67'; Terho 71'; Nilsson (yellow card) 90+6'	Report	Sabbatini (yellow card) 76'	Stadium: Constant Vanden Stock Stadium; Attendance: 7,238; Referee: Enea Jorgji (Albania)

31 August 2024 Second leg	Lugano (Switzerland)	0–1 (0–3 agg.)	(Belgium) Union Saint-Gilloise	Geneva, Switzerland (Note: Lugano played their home match at the Stade de Genève in Geneva, instead of their regular stadium, the Cornaredo Stadium in Lugano, which did not meet UEFA requirements.)
20:30 CEST (UTC+2)	Hajdari (yellow card) 40', (red card) 90+3'; Bislimi (yellow card) 45'	Report	Eckert 7'; Lapoussin (yellow card) 38'	Stadium: Stade de Genève; Attendance: 1,171; Referee: Harm Osmers (Germany)
Note: Union Saint-Gilloise won 3–0 on aggregate.

=== UEFA Europa Conference League ===
==== Group stage ====
Pos	Team	Pld	W	D	L	GF	GA	GD	Pts	Qualification	BRU	BOD	BEŞ	LUG
1	(Belgium) Club Brugge	6	5	1	0	15	3	+12	16	Advance to round of 16	—	3–1	1–1	2–0
2	(Norway) Bodø/Glimt	6	3	1	2	11	8	+3	10	Advance to knockout round play-offs	0–1	—	3–1	5–2
3	(Turkey) Beşiktaş	6	1	1	4	7	14	−7	4 (Note: Ranked on head-to-head goal difference: Beşiktaş +1, Lugano –1.)		0–5	1–2	—	2–3
4	(Switzerland) Lugano	6	1	1	4	6	14	−8	4		1–3	0–0	0–2	—

Source: UEFA
Rules for classification: Group stage tiebreakers
Notes:

21 September 2023 1	Lugano (Switzerland)	0–0	(Norway) Bodø/Glimt	Zürich, Switzerland (Note: Lugano played their Europa Conference League matches at the Letzigrund, in Zürich, instead of their regular stadium, the Cornaredo Stadium, in Lugano, which did not meet UEFA requirements.)
21:00 CEST (UTC+2)	Sabbatini (yellow card) 64'; Bislimi (yellow card) 76'; Croci-Torti (not on pitch) (yellow card) 79'; Saipi (yellow card) 90'	Report	Saltnes (yellow card) 67'	Stadium: Letzigrund; Attendance: 1,384; Referee: David Šmajc (Slovenia)

5 October 2023 2	Beşiktaş (Turkey)	2–3	(Switzerland) Lugano	Istanbul, Turkey
19:45 TRT (UTC+3)	Aboubakar 38', 52'; Rosier (yellow card) 43' (yellow-red card) 61'	Report	Bottani (yellow card) 43'; Aliseda 81'; Vladi 86'; Bailly 90' (o.g.)	Stadium: Beşiktaş Park; Attendance: 24,648; Referee: David Fuxman (Israel)

26 October 2023 3	Lugano (Switzerland)	1–3	(Belgium) Club Brugge	Zürich, Switzerland
18:45 CEST (UTC+2)	Croci-Torti (not on pitch) (yellow card) 43'; Steffen (yellow card) 45'; Hajrizi (yellow card) 56'; Vladi (yellow card) 72', (goal) 74'	Report	Balanta 15'; Thiago (yellow card) 27'; Vanaken (yellow card) 46', (goal) 87'; Skov Olsen 50'; Jutglà (yellow card) 89'	Stadium: Letzigrund; Attendance: 4,037; Referee: Ovidiu Hațegan (Romania)

9 November 2023 4	Club Brugge (Belgium)	2–0	(Switzerland) Lugano	Bruges, Belgium
21:00 CET (UTC+1)	Thiago (yellow card) 47', (goal) 62' (pen.); Vanaken (yellow card) 64', (goal) 90+6'; Jutglà (penalty missed) 85'	Report	Martim Marques (yellow card) 41'; Belhadj Mahmoud (yellow card) 43'; Steffen (yellow card) 66'; Sabbatini (yellow card) 74'; El Wafi (yellow card) 90+5'	Stadium: Jan Breydel Stadium; Attendance: 16,493; Referee: Tamás Bognár (Hungary)

30 November 2023 5	Bodø/Glimt (Norway)	5–2	(Switzerland) Lugano	Bodø, Norway
18:45 CET (UTC+1)	Pellegrino 40', 78', (yellow card) 60'; Moumbagna (yellow card) 41'; Brunstad Fet 52'; Berg 65'; Žugelj (yellow card) 81'; Kapskarmo 88'	Report	Belhadj Mahmoud (yellow card) 45'; Saipi (yellow card) 60'; Cimignani (yellow card) 63'; Celar 69'; Babic 86'; Vladi (yellow card) 90+2'; Hajdari (yellow card) 90+5'	Stadium: Aspmyra Stadion; Attendance: 6,295; Referee: Dario Bel (Croatia)

14 December 2023 6	Lugano (Switzerland)	0–2	(Turkey) Beşiktaş	Zürich, Switzerland
21:00 CET (UTC+1)	Espinoza (yellow card) 73'; Hajdari (yellow card) 76'; Steffen (red card) 90'	Report	Muleka (yellow card) 10'; Tosun 36'; Ege Tıknaz (yellow card) 63'; Hekimoğlu (yellow card) 75'; Bulut (yellow card) 75'; Zaynutdinov (yellow card) 79'; Terzi 88'; Oxlade-Chamberlain (red card) 90'	Stadium: Letzigrund; Attendance: 5,476; Referee: Paweł Raczkowski (Poland)
