= List of Swiss football transfers summer 2023 =

This is a list of Swiss football transfers for the 2023 summer transfer window. Only transfers featuring Swiss Super League are listed.

== Swiss Super League ==
Note: Flags indicate national team as has been defined under FIFA eligibility rules. Players may hold more than one non-FIFA nationality.

=== Young Boys ===
In:

No.	Pos.	Nation	Player
8	MF	POL	Łukasz Łakomy (from (Poland) Zagłębie Lubin)
11	FW	GAM	Ebrima Colley (on loan from (Italy) Atalanta, previously on loan at (Turkey) Fatih Karagümrük)
17	DF	GAM	Saidy Janko (from (Spain) Real Valladolid, previously on loan at (Germany) VfL Bochum)
35	FW	CGO	Silvère Ganvoula (from (Germany) VfL Bochum)
39	MF	SUI	Darian Males (from (Italy) Inter Milan, previously on loan at Basel)
47	MF	SUI	Malik Deme (from Grasshoppers youth)

Out:

No.	Pos.	Nation	Player
5	DF	SUI	Cédric Zesiger (to (Germany) VfL Wolfsburg)
16	MF	SUI	Christian Fassnacht (to (England) Norwich City)
17	DF	SUI	Kevin Rüegg (loan return to (Italy) Hellas Verona)
24	DF	SUI	Quentin Maceiras (to (Hungary) Puskás Akadémia)
32	MF	SUI	Fabian Rieder (to (France) Rennes)
60	MF	SUI	Théo Golliard (on loan to (Liechtenstein) Vaduz)
63	DF	SUI	Joel Bichsel (on loan to (Germany) SC Freiburg II)
—	FW	SUI	Yannick Toure (to Aarau)
—	MF	SUI	Alexandre Jankewitz (on loan to Winterthur, previously on loan at Thun)
—	MF	SUI	Nico Maier (to Wil, previously on loan)
—	MF	SUI	Mischa Eberhard (to SLO, previously on loan at Aarau)
—	FW	SUI	Felix Mambimbi (to St. Gallen, previously on loan at (Netherlands) Cambuur)

=== Servette ===
In:

No.	Pos.	Nation	Player
1	GK	CYP	Joël Mall (from (Cyprus) Olympiakos Nicosia)
3	DF	JPN	Keigo Tsunemoto (from (Japan) Kashima Antlers)
5	MF	CMR	Gaël Ondoua (from (Germany) Hannover 96)
18	DF	CGO	Bradley Mazikou (from (Greece) Aris)
21	FW	SUI	Jérémy Guillemenot (from St. Gallen)
22	MF	DEN	Alexander Lyng (from (Denmark) Helsingør)
68	DF	CMR	Jérôme Onguéné (on loan from (Germany) Eintracht Frankfurt, previously on loan at (Austria) Red Bull Salzburg)
77	DF	HUN	Bendegúz Bolla (on loan from (England) Wolverhampton Wanderers, previously on loan at Grasshoppers)

Out:

No.	Pos.	Nation	Player
1	GK	SUI	Steven Deana (to Lugano)
3	DF	FRA	Gaël Clichy (free agent)
5	MF	BOL	Boris Céspedes (to Yverdon)
7	FW	GER	Patrick Pflücke (to (Belgium) Mechelen)
15	MF	FRA	Theo Valls (free agent)
24	DF	SUI	Malik Sawadogo (on loan to Stade Nyonnais)
25	MF	CIV	Sidiki Camara (on loan to Stade Nyonnais)
26	DF	AUT	Moritz Bauer (free agent)
40	GK	SUI	Edin Omeragić (on loan to Stade Nyonnais)
43	DF	SUI	Kevin Mbabu (loan return to (England) Fulham)
—	FW	SUI	Dimitri Oberlin (to (Turkey) Adanaspor, previously on loan at Thun)

=== Lugano ===
In:

No.	Pos.	Nation	Player
15	GK	GRE	Fotis Pseftis (from (Italy) Milan Primavera)
16	MF	SUI	Anto Grgić (from Sion)
19	FW	KOS	Shkelqim Vladi (from Aarau)
21	MF	FRA	Yanis Cimignani (from (France) Ajaccio)
22	DF	MAR	Ayman El Wafi (from (Italy) Hellas Verona youth)
26	DF	POR	Martim Marques (from (Portugal) Sporting CP B)
90	GK	SUI	Steven Deana (from Servette)

Out:

No.	Pos.	Nation	Player
7	DF	SUI	Mickaël Facchinetti (free agent)
30	DF	SUI	Fabio Daprelà (to Zürich)
47	FW	ALG	Mohamed Amoura (to (Belgium) Union SG)
—	GK	SUI	Alexander Muci (to Bellinzona, previously on loan)

=== Luzern ===
In:

No.	Pos.	Nation	Player
10	MF	SUI	Kevin Spadanuda (from (France) Ajaccio)
11	FW	FRA	Teddy Okou (from SLO)
22	DF	SUI	Dario Ulrich (from (Liechtenstein) Vaduz)
32	MF	SUI	Nicolas Haas (on loan from (Italy) Empoli)
99	FW	SUI	Kemal Ademi (from (Russia) Khimki, previously on loan at (Germany) SV Sandhausen)

Out:

No.	Pos.	Nation	Player
1	GK	GER	Marius Müller (to (Germany) Schalke 04)
2	DF	TUN	Mohamed Dräger (loan return to (England) Nottingham Forest)
8	MF	GHA	Samuel Alabi (on loan to Baden)
9	FW	SUI	Dejan Sorgić (to Sion)
11	MF	SUI	Pascal Schürpf (to Grasshoppers)
15	MF	MLI	Mamady Diambou (loan return to (Austria) Red Bull Salzburg)
22	FW	SUI	Nando Toggenburger (on loan to Thun)
24	DF	SUI	Thoma Monney (on loan to Biel-Bienne)
31	MF	KOS	Lorik Emini (to (Liechtenstein) Vaduz)
40	DF	SUI	Rúben Dantas Fernandes (on loan to Wil)
46	DF	SUI	Marco Burch (to (Poland) Legia Warsaw)
77	FW	SWE	Benjamin Mbunga Kimpioka (loan return to (Sweden) AIK)
—	MF	SUI	Yvan Alounga (on loan to Bellinzona, previously on loan at SLO)
—	FW	GER	Varol Tasar (on loan to Yverdon, previously on loan at Aarau)
—	FW	URU	Joaquín Ardaiz (on loan to (Turkey) Şanlıurfaspor, previously on loan at Winterthur)
—	MF	NED	Jordy Wehrmann (free agent, previously on loan at (Netherlands) ADO Den Haag)
—	MF	SUI	Lino Lang (to Cham, previously on loan at Étoile Carouge)
—	FW	KOS	Mark Marleku (to Schaffhausen, previously on loan at Kriens)

=== Basel ===
In:

No.	Pos.	Nation	Player

Out:

No.	Pos.	Nation	Player
19	MF	SUI	Darian Males (loan return to (Italy) Inter Milan)

=== St. Gallen ===
In:

No.	Pos.	Nation	Player
18	FW	SUI	Felix Mambimbi (from Young Boys, previously on loan at (Netherlands) Cambuur)

Out:

No.	Pos.	Nation	Player
9	FW	SUI	Jérémy Guillemenot (to Servette)

=== Grasshoppers ===
In:

No.	Pos.	Nation	Player
11	MF	SUI	Pascal Schürpf (from Luzern)

Out:

No.	Pos.	Nation	Player
77	DF	HUN	Bendegúz Bolla (loan return to (England) Wolverhampton Wanderers)

=== Zürich ===
In:

No.	Pos.	Nation	Player
5	DF	SUI	Fabio Daprelà (from Lugano)

Out:

No.	Pos.	Nation	Player
42	DF	CUB	Fabian Gloor (loan to Baden)

=== Winterthur ===
In:

No.	Pos.	Nation	Player
45	MF	SUI	Alexandre Jankewitz (on loan from Young Boys, previously on loan at Thun)

Out:

No.	Pos.	Nation	Player
11	FW	URU	Joaquín Ardaiz (loan return to Luzern)

=== Yverdon ===
In:

No.	Pos.	Nation	Player
5	MF	BOL	Boris Céspedes (from Servette)
27	FW	GER	Varol Tasar (on loan from Luzern, previously on loan at Aarau)

Out:

No.	Pos.	Nation	Player

=== Lausanne ===
In:

No.	Pos.	Nation	Player

Out:

No.	Pos.	Nation	Player

=== SLO ===
In:

No.	Pos.	Nation	Player
16	MF	SUI	Mischa Eberhard (from Young Boys, previously on loan at Aarau)

Out:

No.	Pos.	Nation	Player
11	FW	FRA	Teddy Okou (to Luzern)
12	MF	SUI	Yvan Alounga (loan return to Luzern)

== See also ==
- 2023–24 Swiss Super League
