= Milton Valenzuela =

Argentine footballer (born 1998)

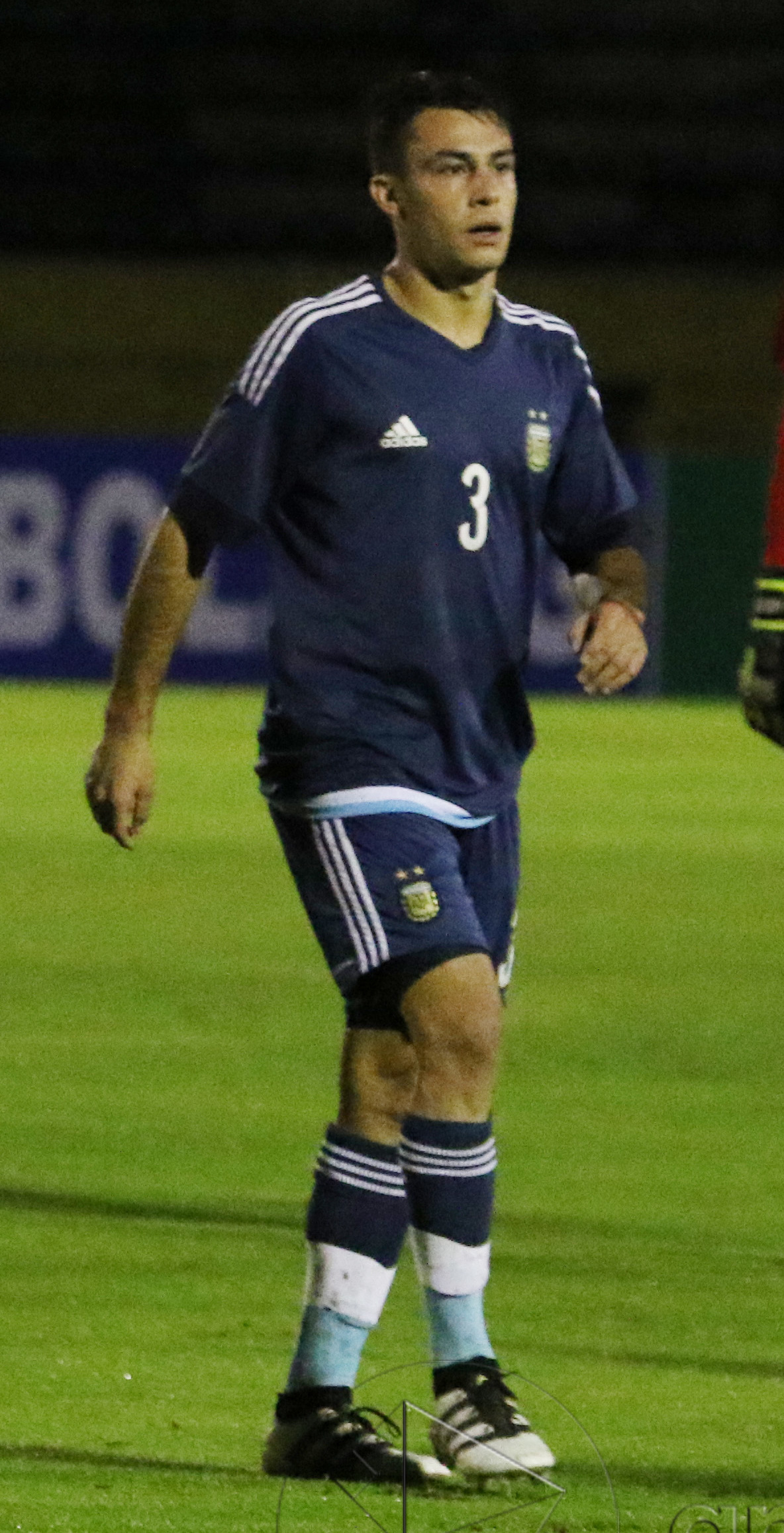
- Valenzuela with the Argentina U20 in 2017

Personal information
- Full name: Milton Nahuel Valenzuela
- Date of birth: 13 August 1998 (age 28)
- Place of birth: Rosario, Santa Fe, Argentina
- Height: 5 ft 7 in (1.70 m)
- Position: Fullback

Team information
- Current team: Atlas
- Number: 16

Youth career
- 2013–2016: Newell's Old Boys

Senior career*
Years	Team	Apps	(Gls)
2016–2019	Newell's Old Boys	13	(0)
2018	→ Columbus Crew (loan)	30	(1)
2019–2021	Columbus Crew	33	(0)
2022–2025	Lugano	82	(4)
2025–2026	Independiente	12	(0)
2026–	Atlas	12	(0)

International career^{‡}
2017–2018	Argentina U20	10	(0)
2021	Argentina U23	1	(0)
- * Club domestic league appearances and goals as of 28 October 2026 (UTC) ‡ National team caps and goals as of 20 July 2021

Milton Nahuel Valenzuela (born 13 August 1998) is an Argentine professional footballer who plays as a defender for Liga MX club Atlas.

== Club career ==
=== Newell's Old Boys ===
Valenzuela is a youth exponent from Newell's Old Boys, having joined the club at the age of 14. He broke into the first team at the age of 17, making his league debut on 6 February 2016 against San Martín de San Juan in a 2–1 away defeat in Rosario. While never becoming a permanent feature with the first team after his break through, Valenzuela made 13 league appearances for the club, along with 3 cup appearances, over three seasons.

Because of his youth and lack of playing time, on January 26, 2018, Valenzuela was sent on a year long loan to Columbus Crew SC of Major League Soccer, with an option to buy at the end of the loan. After a successful season with Columbus in MLS, the Crew exercised their purchase option at the end of the 2018 season and Valenzuela ended his time with his boyhood club.

=== Columbus Crew ===
Valenzuela made his debut for Columbus on 3 March 2018, playing 90 minutes in a 2–0 win against Toronto FC. He scored his first professional goal on 24 March 2018 in a 3–1 win against D.C. United. Over the course of the season he made 30 appearances with 29 starts. Valenzuela was an immediate success for Columbus, and over the course of the season, became one of the league's top attacking defenders. Valenzuela completed 27 crosses from the run of play, first among defenders in the league, and was among the best tacklers in the league winning 57 out of 87. Moreover, the defender also scored one goal and produced six assists.

On 21 December 2018, it was announced that Valenzuela's immensely successful first season in Columbus had caused the team to exercise their purchase option signing Valenzuela permanently ahead of their 2019 season. However, despite an encouraging preseason, Valenzuela suffered a tear in his ACL during training and would be out for the entirety of the 2019 season.

Valenzuela returned from injury for Columbus during the 2020 season. He made a total of 24 appearances and was part of the team that won the 2020 MLS Cup.

During the 2021 season, Valenzuela played in only 14 of the Crew's 34 regular season games, dealing with hamstring issues throughout the majority of the year. On April 28, Valenzuela scored his only goal of the season against Monterrey in the 2021 CONCACAF Champions League quarterfinal.

=== Lugano ===
On 30 January 2022, Valenzuela signed a contract with Lugano in Switzerland until 30 June 2025.

=== Independiente ===
On 15 July 2025, Valenzuela returned to Argentina to join Independiente as a free agent, signing a contract until the end of 2026.

== Personal life ==
Before moving to Columbus, Ohio, Valenzuela lived with his entire family in Argentina. He admitted that there was a learning curve that comes with moving from Argentina to the United States, while also living by himself for the first time. However, he believes that these experiences will help him become a better person and a stronger footballer.

== Career statistics ==
As of 3 March 2026

Appearances and goals by club, season and competition
Club	Season	League			Cup		Continental (Note: Includes CONCACAF Champions League, UEFA Conference League, UEFA Europa League, UEFA Champions League)		Other		Total	
Club	Season	Division	Apps	Goals	Apps	Goals	Apps	Goals	Apps	Goals	Apps	Goals
Newell's Old Boys	2016	Argentine Primera División	2	0	0	0	—		—		2	0
Newell's Old Boys	2016–17	Argentine Primera División	3	0	0	0	—		1	0	4	0
Newell's Old Boys	2017–18	Argentine Primera División	9	0	2	0	—		—		11	0
Newell's Old Boys	Total		14	0	2	0	0	0	1	0	17	0
Columbus Crew	2018	Major League Soccer	30	1	1	0	—		3 (Note: Appearances in 2018 MLS Cup Playoffs)	0	34	1
Columbus Crew	2019	Major League Soccer	0	0	0	0	—		—		0	0
Columbus Crew	2020	Major League Soccer	22	0	—		—		2 (Note: Appearances in MLS is Back Tournament)	0	24	0
Columbus Crew	2021	Major League Soccer	14	0	0	0	3	1	1 (Note: Appearance in Campeones Cup)	0	18	1
Columbus Crew	Total		66	1	1	0	3	1	6	0	76	2
Lugano	2021–22	Swiss Super League	12	0	2	0	0	0	—		14	0
Lugano	2022–23	Swiss Super League	30	2	5	0	2	0	—		37	2
Lugano	2023–24	Swiss Super League	18	2	3	0	2	0	—		23	2
Lugano	2024–25	Swiss Super League	22	0	2	1	12	1	—		36	2
Lugano	Total		82	4	12	1	16	1	0	0	110	6
Independiente	2025	Argentine Primera División	5	0	0	0	—		—		5	0
Independiente	2026	Argentine Primera División	2	0	0	0	—		—		2	0
Independiente	Total		7	0	0	0	0	0	0	0	7	0
Career Total			169	5	15	1	19	2	7	0	210	8

== Honours ==
Columbus Crew

- MLS Cup (1): 2020
- Campeones Cup: 2021

Lugano

- Swiss Cup: 2021–22
