= 2005–06 Hellas Verona FC season =

Hellas Verona F.C.
2005–06 season
- President: Giambattista Pastorello
- Manager: Massimo Ficcadenti
- Stadium: Stadio Marcantonio Bentegodi
- Serie B: 15th
- Coppa Italia: Second round

The 2005–06 season was the 103rd season in the existence of Hellas Verona F.C. and the club's fourth consecutive season in the second division of Italian football. In addition to the domestic league, Hellas Verona participated in this season's edition of the Coppa Italia.

== Competitions ==
=== Overall record ===
Competition	First match	Last match	Starting round	Final position	Record							
Competition	First match	Last match	Starting round	Final position	Pld	W	D	L	GF	GA	GD	Win %
Serie B	26 August 2005	28 May 2006	Matchday 1	15th	42	10	19	13	42	41	+1	23.81
Coppa Italia	7 August 2005	14 August 2005	First round	Second round	2	1	0	1	3	2	+1	50.00
Total					44	11	19	14	45	43	+2	25.00

Source: Competitions

=== Serie B ===
==== League table ====
Pos	Team	Pld	W	D	L	GF	GA	GD	Pts
13	Bari	42	11	18	13	43	47	−4	51
14	Triestina	42	12	15	15	44	51	−7	51
15	Hellas Verona	42	10	19	13	42	41	+1	49
16	Vicenza	42	13	10	19	38	49	−11	49
17	Rimini	42	11	15	16	42	49	−7	48

Source: Almanacco Illustrato del Calcio 2007, Panini Edizioni, Modena, November 2006
Rules for classification: 1) points; 2) head-to-head points; 3) head-to-head goal difference; 4) head-to-head goals scored; 5) goal difference; 6) number of goals scored.

==== Results by round ====
Round	1	2	3	4	5	6	7	8	9	10	11	12	13	14	15	16	17	18	19	20	21	22	23	24	25
Ground	H	A	H	A	H	A	H	A	H	H	A	H	A	H	A	A	H	A	H	A	H	A	H	A	H
Result	D	L	W	W	W	D	D	L	W	D	D	D	W	D	W	L	L	W	D	D	D	D	L	L	W
Position	12	16	8	6	4	5	5	9	7	8	9	10	5	7	6										

Source: Serie B
A = Away; H = Home; W = Win; D = Draw; L = Loss

==== Matches ====
26 August 2005 1	Hellas Verona	0–0	Avellino	Verona
--:-- CEST (UTC+2)

4 September 2005 2	Atalanta	3–2	Hellas Verona	Bergamo
--:-- CEST (UTC+2)

10 September 2005 4	Cremonese	0–2	Hellas Verona	Cremona
--:-- CEST (UTC+2)

16 September 2005 5	Hellas Verona	1–0	Catanzaro	Verona
--:-- CEST (UTC+2)

21 September 2005 6	Rimini	0–0	Hellas Verona	Rimini
--:-- CEST (UTC+2)

24 September 2005 7	Hellas Verona	0–0	Brescia	Verona
--:-- CEST (UTC+2)

1 October 2005 8	Pescara	1–0	Hellas Verona	Pescara
--:-- CEST (UTC+2)

4 October 2005 3	Hellas Verona	3–1	Bologna	Verona
--:-- CEST (UTC+2)

9 October 2005 9	Hellas Verona	1–0	Ternana	Verona
--:-- CEST (UTC+2)

15 October 2005 10	Hellas Verona	1–1	Arezzo	Verona
--:-- CEST (UTC+2)

22 October 2005 11	Modena	1–1	Hellas Verona	Modena
--:-- CEST (UTC+2)

26 October 2005 12	Hellas Verona	0–0	AlbinoLeffe	Verona
--:-- CEST (UTC+2)

29 October 2005 13	Triestina	0–3	Hellas Verona	Trieste
--:-- CEST (UTC+2)

5 November 2005 14	Hellas Verona	1–1	Crotone	Verona
--:-- CET (UTC+1)

13 November 2005 15	Vicenza	0–1	Hellas Verona	Vicenza
--:-- CET (UTC+1)

19 November 2005 16	Torino	2–1	Hellas Verona	Turin
--:-- CET (UTC+1)

28 November 2005 17	Hellas Verona	1–2	Catania	Verona
--:-- CET (UTC+1)

3 December 2005 18	Piacenza	0–1	Hellas Verona	Piacenza
--:-- CET (UTC+1)

9 December 2005 19	Hellas Verona	2–2	Mantova	Verona
--:-- CET (UTC+1)

17 December 2005 20	Bari	1–1	Hellas Verona	Bari
--:-- CET (UTC+1)

20 December 2005 21	Hellas Verona	1–1	Cesena	Verona
--:-- CET (UTC+1)

7 January 2006 22	Avellino	1–1	Hellas Verona	Avellino
--:-- CET (UTC+1)

14 January 2006 23	Hellas Verona	0–1	Atalanta	Verona
--:-- CET (UTC+1)

17 January 2006 24	Bologna	2–1	Hellas Verona	Bologna
--:-- CET (UTC+1)

21 January 2006 25	Hellas Verona	1–0	Cremonese	Verona
--:-- CET (UTC+1)
