= Kacper Przybyłko =

Polish footballer (born 1993)

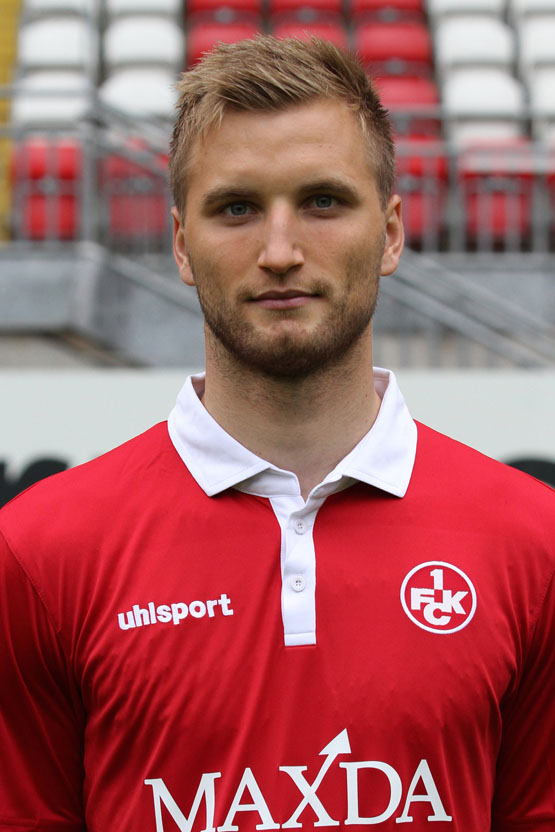
- Przybyłko with 1. FC Kaiserslautern in 2016

Personal information
- Date of birth: 25 March 1993 (age 33)
- Place of birth: Bielefeld, Germany
- Height: 1.92 m (6 ft 4 in)
- Position: Striker

Team information
- Current team: Odra Opole
- Number: 19

Youth career
- TuS Jöllenbeck
- 2003–2012: Arminia Bielefeld

Senior career*
Years	Team	Apps	(Gls)
2011–2012	Arminia Bielefeld II	13	(15)
2011–2012	Arminia Bielefeld	2	(0)
2012–2014	1. FC Köln II	39	(21)
2012–2014	1. FC Köln	23	(2)
2014	→ Arminia Bielefeld (loan)	14	(4)
2014–2015	Greuther Fürth	32	(5)
2015–2018	1. FC Kaiserslautern	45	(9)
2018	1. FC Kaiserslautern II	3	(0)
2018–2021	Philadelphia Union	83	(35)
2019	→ Bethlehem Steel (loan)	2	(3)
2022–2024	Chicago Fire	50	(9)
2024–2025	Lugano	24	(5)
2024	Lugano II	1	(0)
2025–	Odra Opole	21	(3)

International career
2008	Poland U15	2	(2)
2008–2009	Poland U16	4	(0)
2009–2010	Poland U17	8	(3)
2010	Poland U18	1	(0)
2011	Poland U19	3	(1)
2012	Poland U20	5	(3)
2013–2014	Poland U21	10	(5)
- * Club domestic league appearances and goals as of 08:32, 27 May 2026 (UTC)

Kacper Przybyłko (born 25 March 1993) is a professional footballer who plays as a striker for I liga club Odra Opole. Born in Germany, he represented Poland at various youth international levels.

== Club career ==
=== 1. FC Köln ===
On 31 January 2012, Przybyłko joined 1. FC Köln's reserve team from Arminia Bielefeld.

=== Greuther Fürth ===
After the end of his loan to Bielefeld in summer 2014, he left 1. FC Köln to join Greuther Fürth on a three-year deal until 2017. He was described as tough and good on the ball.

=== 1. FC Kaiserslautern ===
Przybyłko joined 1. FC Kaiserslautern in July 2015 and scored two goals in his debut for the club. In summer 2018 he was released by the club.

In August 2018, he trialled with 1. FC Magdeburg of the 2. Bundesliga.

=== Philadelphia Union ===
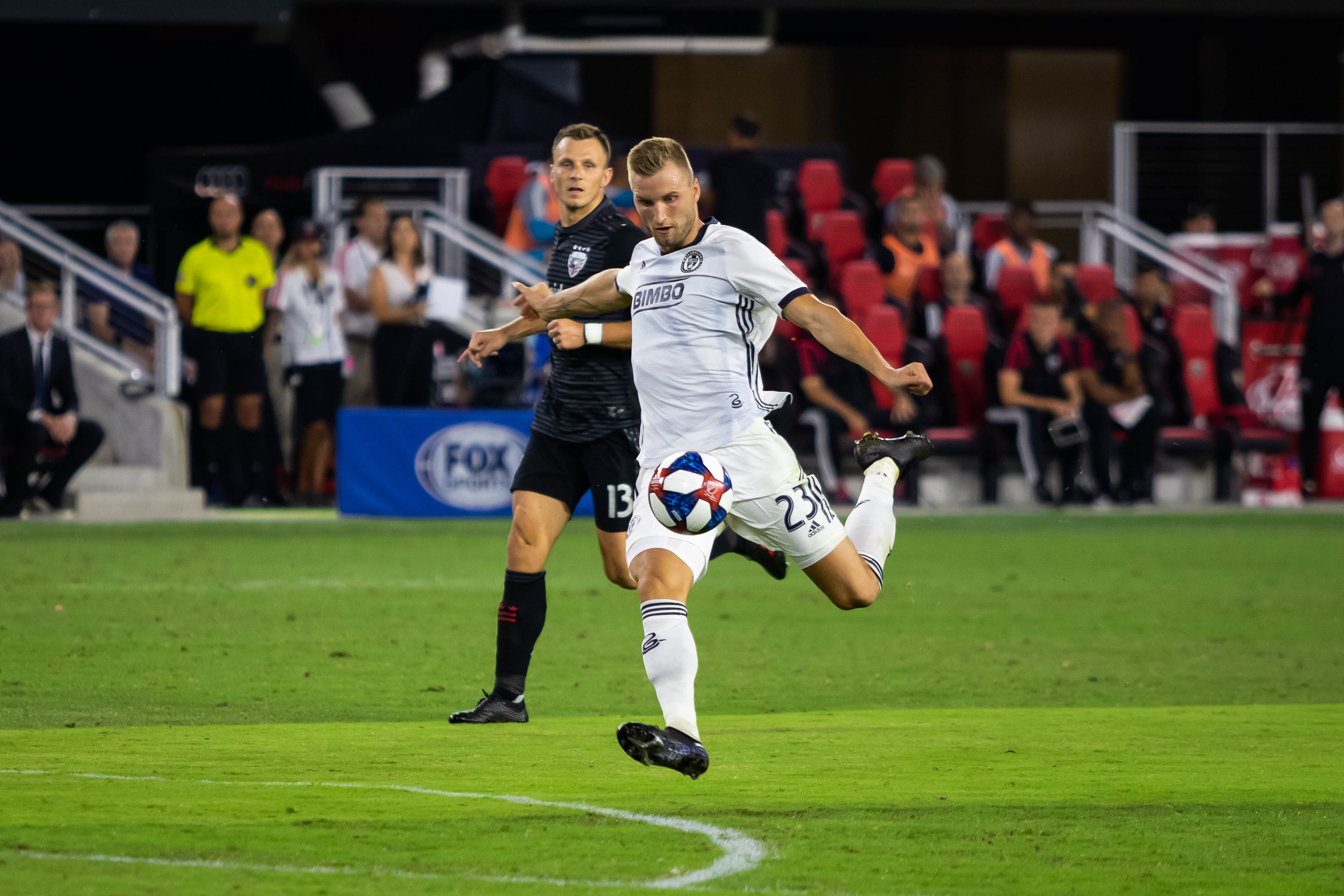
Przybyłko playing for Philadelphia Union in 2019

On 16 September 2018, Przybyłko signed with Philadelphia Union competing in Major League Soccer for the remainder of the 2018 season with an option for 2019. Despite not making an appearance for the Union in 2018, his option was picked up ahead of the 2019 season. After a brief loan to Bethlehem Steel to recover from a foot injury, Przybyłko made his debut for the Union as a substitute against the Montreal Impact. A week later, he scored his first goal for the Union as an equalizer against Vancouver Whitecaps FC. Przybyłko continued to become a scoring threat over the season, leading the Union's scoring with 15 goals before suffering an injury and keeping him out for the post-season.

==== 2019 season: Loan to Bethlehem Steel ====
Prior to the start of the 2019 season, Przybyłko was loaned to the Union's affiliate, Bethlehem Steel FC, who compete in the USL Championship. Przybyłko started in the opening match away against Birmingham Legion FC and scored the first goal of Steel FC's season.

=== Chicago Fire ===
On 22 January 2022, Przybyłko was traded to Chicago Fire in exchange for $1,150,000 of General Allocation Money.

=== Lugano ===
After spending three and a half years in the United States, Przybyłko returned to Europe in February 2024. On 16 February, he joined Swiss club Lugano on a deal until the end of June 2025. On 30 March, he made his league debut coming on as a substitute against Stade Lausanne Ouchy and scored the final goal of the game in a 1–3 away win.

In May 2025, Lugano announced Przybyłko would depart the club at the conclusion of the 2024–25 season.

=== Odra Opole ===
On 7 August 2025, Przybyłko joined Polish second division side Odra Opole on a two-year deal, with an option for a further year.

== International career ==
Przybyłko played for the Poland national U21 team.

== Personal life ==
Born in Bielefeld, Kacper Przybyłko comes from a sporting family of Polish origin. His twin brother, Jakub, is also a footballer who joined Greuther Fürth in 2014, and later played for the second team in fourth-tier Regionalliga Bayern. His older brother Mateusz Przybylko is a high jumper representing Germany in international competitions.

== Career statistics ==
=== Club ===
As of match played 24 May 2026

Appearances and goals by club, season and competition
Club	Season	League			National cup (Note: Includes DFB-Pokal, U.S. Open Cup, Swiss Cup, Polish Cup)		Continental		Other		Total	
Club	Season	Division	Apps	Goals	Apps	Goals	Apps	Goals	Apps	Goals	Apps	Goals
Arminia Bielefeld	2011–12	3. Liga	2	0	—		—		0	0	2	0
1. FC Köln II	2011–12	Regionalliga West	17	10	—		—		0	0	17	10
1. FC Köln II	2012–13	Regionalliga West	20	11	—		—		0	0	20	11
1. FC Köln II	2013–14	Regionalliga West	2	0	—		—		0	0	2	0
1. FC Köln II	Total		39	21	0	0	0	0	0	0	39	21
1. FC Köln	2012–13	2. Bundesliga	15	1	2	0	—		0	0	17	1
1. FC Köln	2013–14	2. Bundesliga	8	1	0	0	—		0	0	8	1
1. FC Köln	Total		23	2	2	0	0	0	0	0	25	2
Arminia Bielefeld	2013–14	2. Bundesliga	14	4	0	0	—		2 (Note: Appearances in the 2. Bundesliga promotion-relegation play-offs)	1	16	5
Greuther Fürth	2014–15	2. Bundesliga	32	5	1	0	—		0	0	33	5
1. FC Kaiserslautern	2015–16	2. Bundesliga	30	7	2	0	—		0	0	32	7
1. FC Kaiserslautern	2016–17	2. Bundesliga	14	2	0	0	—		0	0	14	2
1. FC Kaiserslautern	2017–18	2. Bundesliga	1	0	0	0	—		0	0	1	0
1. FC Kaiserslautern	Total		45	9	2	0	0	0	0	0	47	9
Philadelphia Union	2019	Major League Soccer	26	15	0	0	—		0	0	26	15
Philadelphia Union	2020	Major League Soccer	23	8	—		—		4 (Note: Appearances in the MLS is Back Tournament) (Note: Appearances in the MLS Cup Playoffs)	0	27	8
Philadelphia Union	2021	Major League Soccer	34	12	0	0	6 (Note: Appearances in the CONCACAF Champions League)	5	3	0	43	17
Philadelphia Union	Total		83	35	0	0	6	5	7	0	96	40
Bethlehem Steel FC (loan)	2019	USL Championship	2	3	—		—		0	0	2	3
Chicago Fire	2022	Major League Soccer	25	5	1	0	—		0	0	26	5
Chicago Fire	2023	Major League Soccer	25	4	3	2	—		3 (Note: Appearances in Leagues Cup)	0	31	6
Chicago Fire	Total		50	9	4	2	—		3	0	57	11
Lugano	2023–24	Swiss Super League	3	1	1	0	—		—		4	1
Lugano	2024–25	Swiss Super League	21	4	4	3	12 (Note: Two appearances in UEFA Champions League, two appearances in UEFA Europa League, eight appearances in UEFA Conference League)	0	—		37	7
Lugano	Total		24	5	5	3	12	0	—		41	8
Lugano II	2023–24	Swiss Promotion League	1	0	—		—		—		1	0
Odra Opole	2025–26	I liga	21	3	2	0	—		—		23	3
Career total			336	96	16	5	18	5	12	1	382	107

== Honours ==
Philadelphia Union

- Supporters' Shield: 2020

Individual

- CONCACAF Champions League Golden Boot: 2021
- CONCACAF Champions League Team of the Tournament: 2021
