= 2002–03 FC Lugano season =

FC Lugano
2002–03 season
- Stadium: Cornaredo Stadium
- Nationalliga B: Qualification phase: 4th Promotion/relegation play-off: 8th (demoted)
- Swiss Cup: Quarter-finals
- UEFA Cup: Qualifying round

The 2002–03 season was the 95th season in the history of FC Lugano and their first following their return to Nationalliga B, Switzerland's second division. Lugano was unable to complete the season after going bankrupt and was dissolved on 9 April 2003.

== Competitions ==
=== Overall record ===
Competition	First match	Last match	Starting round	Final position	Record							
Competition	First match	Last match	Starting round	Final position	Pld	W	D	L	GF	GA	GD	Win %
Nationalliga B regular season	5 July 2002	8 December 2002	Matchday 1	4th	22	12	6	4	36	17	+19	54.55
Promotion play-offs	1 March 2003	21 March 2003	Matchday 1	8th (administratively relegated)	4	0	2	2	3	5	−2	0.00
Swiss Cup	22 October 2002	23 February 2003		Quarter-finals	3	2	0	1	7	3	+4	66.67
UEFA Cup	15 August 2002	29 August 2002	Qualifying round	Qualifying round	2	1	0	1	1	3	−2	50.00
Total					31	15	8	8	47	28	+19	48.39

Source: Competitions

=== Nationalliga B ===
==== League table ====
Pos	Team	Pld	W	D	L	GF	GA	GD	BP	Pts	Qualification
2	FC Sion	22	12	3	7	35	27	+8	0	39	Advance to promotion/relegation group NLA/NLB
3	SC Kriens	22	11	5	6	48	36	+12	0	38	Advance to promotion/relegation group NLA/NLB
4	FC Lugano	22	12	6	4	36	17	+19	−5	37	Advance to promotion/relegation group NLA/NLB
5	Yverdon-Sport FC	22	10	6	6	36	21	+15	0	36	Continue to relegation round NLB/1. Liga halved points (rounded up) as bonus
6	FC Schaffhausen	22	8	8	6	30	35	−5	0	32	Continue to relegation round NLB/1. Liga halved points (rounded up) as bonus

Source: RSSSF
Rules for classification: 1) points; 2) goal difference; 3) number of goals scored.
FC Lugano: 5 points deducted for irregularities in license application.
FC Winterthur: 8 points deducted for irregularities in license application.

==== Matches ====
5 July 2002 1	Baden	0–2	Lugano

12 July 2002 2	Lugano	1–0	Sion

20 July 2002 4	Lugano	2–0	Yverdon-Sport

25 July 2002 5	Concordia	0–1	Lugano

3 August 2002 6	Lugano	3–0	Wohlen

6 August 2002 3	Kriens	4–2	Lugano

10 August 2002 7	Bellinzona	3–4	Lugano

18 August 2002 8	Lugano	0–0	Vaduz

24 August 2002 9	Schaffhausen	0–4	Lugano

1 September 2002 10	Lugano	0–1	Lausanne-Sport

11 September 2002 11	Winterthur	0–1	Lugano

14 September 2002 12	Lugano	1–1	Baden

21 September 2002 13	Sion	0–4	Lugano

27 September 2002 14	Lugano	2–0	Kriens

5 October 2002 15	Yverdon-Sport	0–0	Lugano

20 October 2002 16	Lugano	1–1	Concordia

26 October 2002 17	Wohlen	0–0	Lugano

3 November 2002 18	Lugano	3–1	Bellinzona

17 November 2002 19	Vaduz	3–2	Lugano

24 November 2002 20	Lugano	2–1	Schaffhausen

1 December 2002 21	Lausanne-Sport	1–1	Lugano

8 December 2002 22	Lugano	0–1	Winterthur

==== Promotion play-offs ====
1 March 2003 1	Delémont	1–1; Annulled	Lugano

7 March 2003 2	Lugano	1–1; Annulled	Kriens

16 March 2003 3	St. Gallen	1–0; Annulled	Lugano

21 March 2003 4	Lugano	1–2; Annulled	Aarau

=== Swiss Cup ===
22 October 2002	FC Altstetten ZH	0–4	Lugano

10 November 2002	FC Chiasso	1–3	Lugano

23 February 2002 Quarter-finals	Lugano	0–2	Grasshopper
			R.Eduardo 38', 60'

=== UEFA Cup ===
15 August 2002 First leg	Ventspils (Latvia)	3–0	(Switzerland) Lugano	Latvia

29 August 2002 Second leg	Lugano (Switzerland)	1–0 (1–3 agg.)	(Latvia) Ventspils
