= Amir Saipi =

Kosovar footballer (born 2000)

Personal information
- Date of birth: 8 July 2000 (age 26)
- Place of birth: Schaffhausen, Switzerland
- Height: 1.94 m (6 ft 4 in)
- Position: Goalkeeper

Team information
- Current team: Castellón
- Number: 1

Youth career
- –2018: Schaffhausen
- 2017–2018: → Winterthur (loan)

Senior career*
Years	Team	Apps	(Gls)
2016–2019	Schaffhausen U21	2	(0)
2018–2019	→ Grasshoppers U21 (loan)	19	(0)
2019–2021	Schaffhausen	45	(0)
2021–2026	Lugano	140	(0)
2026–	Castellón	0	(0)

International career^{‡}
2019	Switzerland U20	4	(0)
2021–2023	Switzerland U21	14	(0)
2024–	Kosovo	8	(0)
- * Club domestic league appearances and goals as of 17 October 2026 ‡ National team caps and goals as of 15:52, 14 November 2026 (UTC)

Amir Saipi (Note: Albanian: Amir Shaipi; Bosnian: Amir Šaipi) (born 8 July 2000) is a professional footballer who plays as a goalkeeper for Segunda División club CD Castellón. Born in Switzerland, he represents Kosovo at international level.

== Club career ==
=== Lugano ===
On 10 September 2021, Saipi signed a five-year contract with Swiss Super League club Lugano and receiving squad number 26. Two days later, he was named as a first team substitute for the first time in a league match against Basel. His debut with Lugano came five days later in the 2021–22 Swiss Cup second round against Neuchâtel Xamax after being named in the starting line-up. On 24 October 2021, he made his league debut in a 2–0 away defeat again against Basel after being named in the starting line-up.

=== Castellón ===
On 14 July 2026, Saipi signs a contract with Segunda División club CD Castellón until 30 June 2030.

== International career ==
=== Under-20 and proposed Kosovo switch ===
Saipi in 2019 was part of the Switzerland U20 with which he played four matches where most of them were friendly matches. On 26 August 2019, the Football Federation of Kosovo announced that they had held a meeting with Saipi and were very close to starting the procedures of equipping him with the necessary documents to be ready to join Kosovo for the friendly match against Gibraltar and UEFA Euro 2020 qualifying match against Montenegro.

=== Under-21 ===
On 2 October 2020, Saipi received a call-up from Switzerland U21 for the 2021 UEFA European Under-21 Championship qualification matches against Georgia U21 and Liechtenstein U21. On 30 May 2021, he made his debut with Switzerland U21 in a friendly match against Republic of Ireland U21 after being named in the starting line-up.

On 15 June 2023, Saipi was named to the Switzerland U21 squad for the 2023 UEFA European Under-21 Championship, where he played in four matches, including the quarterfinal against Spain, in which they were eliminated 1–2 after extra time.

=== Senior ===
On 29 September 2024, it was announced by Corriere del Ticino that Saipi has decided to represent Kosovo at the international level. Five days later, he formalizes the decision and accept their call-up for the 2024–25 UEFA Nations League matches against Lithuania and Cyprus. His debut with Kosovo came on 12 October in the 2024–25 UEFA Nations League match against Lithuania after being named in the starting line-up.

== Personal life ==
Saipi was born in Schaffhausen, Switzerland to Bosniak parents from the village Lubinjë e Epërme of Prizren.

== Career statistics ==
=== Club ===
As of match played 24 May 2025

Appearances and goals by club, season and competition
Club	Season	League			National cup		Europe		Other		Total	
Club	Season	Division	Apps	Goals	Apps	Goals	Apps	Goals	Apps	Goals	Apps	Goals
Grasshoppers U21 (loan)	2018–19	Swiss 1. Liga	19	0	—		—		—		19	0
Schaffhausen	2018–19	Swiss Super League	0	0	0	0	—		—		0	0
Schaffhausen	2019–20	Swiss Challenge League	30	0	0	0	—		—		30	0
Schaffhausen	2020–21	Swiss Challenge League	11	0	0	0	—		—		11	0
Schaffhausen	2021–22	Swiss Challenge League	4	0	0	0	—		—		4	0
Schaffhausen	Total		45	0	0	0	—		—		45	0
Lugano	2021–22	Swiss Super League	22	0	4	0	—		—		26	0
Lugano	2022–23	Swiss Super League	28	0	3	0	2	0	—		33	0
Lugano	2023–24	Swiss Super League	33	0	5	0	7	0	—		45	0
Lugano	2024–25	Swiss Super League	34	0	0	0	14	0	—		48	0
Lugano	Total		117	0	12	0	23	0	—		152	0
Career total			181	0	12	0	23	0	0	0	216	0

=== International ===
As of match played 14 November 2026

Appearances and goals by national team and year
National team	Year	Apps	Goals
Kosovo	2024	1	0
Kosovo	2025	3	0
Kosovo	2026	4	0
Total		8	0

== Honours ==
Lugano

- Swiss Cup: 2021–22
