= Ayman El Wafi =

Italian-Moroccan footballer (born 2004)

Personal information
- Date of birth: 11 May 2004 (age 22)
- Place of birth: Camaiore, Italy
- Height: 1.89 m (6 ft 2 in)
- Position: Centre-back

Team information
- Current team: Wydad AC
- Number: 13

Youth career
- 2015–2021: Livorno
- 2021–2023: Hellas Verona

Senior career*
Years	Team	Apps	(Gls)
2023–2025	FC Lugano	38	(1)
2023–2025	FC Lugano II	1	(0)
2026–	Wydad AC	0	(0)

International career^{‡}
2021	Morocco U17	1	(0)
2022	Morocco U20	6	(0)
2023–2024	Morocco U23	12	(1)
Medal record
Representing Morocco
U-23 Africa Cup of Nations
Winner	Morocco 2023	U-23 Team
- * Club domestic league appearances and goals as of 21 December 2025 ‡ National team caps and goals as of 6 June 2025

Ayman El Wafi (Arabic: أَيْمَن الْوَافِي, Arabic pronunciation: [ˈʔajman alwaːfiː]; born 11 May 2004) is a professional footballer who plays as a centre-back for Botola Pro club Wydad AC. Born in Italy, El Wafi represents Morocco at youth international level.

== Early life ==
Born and raised in Camaiore, Italy to Moroccan parents, El Wafi relocated to Tangier with his family in 2012, aged eight, following the death of his father; he moved back to his country of birth three years later.

== Club career ==
In the summer of 2015, shortly after his return to Italy, El Wafi was noticed by several scouts from Livorno at a local youth tournament, and subsequently joined the club's youth sector. In February 2021, he joined Hellas Verona's academy, as a consequence of Livorno's financial crisis. Having come through the club's youth ranks, the defender started training with Verona's first team during the 2022–23 season, under head coach Marco Zaffaroni, while establishing himself as a regular starter for the under-19 team.

On 8 June 2023, it was officially announced that El Wafi would join Swiss side FC Lugano on a free transfer from 1 July, having signed a four-year contract with the Ticinese club. On 29 July, he made his professional debut for the club, coming on as a substitute for Kreshnik Hajrizi in the 57th minute of a 1–0 league win over St. Gallen. On 21 September, he made his European debut as an injury-time substitute in a UEFA Europa Conference League goalless draw against Bodø/Glimt in the group stage. On 17 December, he scored his first professional goal in a 2–2 league draw with Servette.

== International career ==
El Wafi has represented Morocco at several youth international levels, having played for the under-20 and under-23 national teams.

In October 2022, he took part in the 2022 UNAF U-20 Tournament in Egypt, which served as a qualifying round for the 2023 U-20 Africa Cup of Nations.

After making his debut for the under-23 national team in March 2023, El Wafi was included in the squad for the 2023 U-23 Africa Cup of Nations, hosted by Morocco itself. As the youngest player in the squad, he played four games throughout the tournament, where the Atlas Lions won their first title and qualified for the 2024 Summer Olympics.

In July 2024, El Wafi was originally included in the Moroccan squad for the men's football tournament at the 2024 Summer Olympics; however, he withdrew after his club refused to release him, and was replaced by Bilal El Ouadghiri.

== Style of play ==
El Wafi has been described as a left-footed centre-back, who can play indifferently in a back-four or a back-three and has good physical and technical attributes.

== Honours ==
Morocco U23

- U-23 Africa Cup of Nations: 2023
