= Roman Macek =

Czech footballer

Personal information
- Date of birth: 18 April 1997 (age 29)
- Place of birth: Zlín, Czech Republic
- Height: 1.88 m (6 ft 2 in)
- Position: Midfielder

Team information
- Current team: Sparta Prague
- Number: 28

Youth career
- –2013: Fastav Zlín
- 2013–2016: Juventus

Senior career*
Years	Team	Apps	(Gls)
2016–2019	Juventus	0	(0)
2017	→ Bari (loan)	16	(0)
2017–2018	→ Cremonese (loan)	10	(1)
2018–2019	→ Lugano (loan)	3	(0)
2018–2019	→→ Team Ticino U21 (loan)	1	(0)
2019–2025	Lugano	108	(1)
2021–2022	→→ Team Ticino U21	4	(1)
2025–2026	Mladá Boleslav	29	(2)
2026–	Sparta Prague	0	(0)

International career^{‡}
2012–2013	Czech Republic U-16	11	(1)
2013–2014	Czech Republic U-17	10	(2)
2014	Czech Republic U-18	4	(0)
2016	Czech Republic U-20	3	(2)
2017–2018	Czech Republic U-21	5	(0)
2026–	Czech Republic	3	(0)
- * Club domestic league appearances and goals as of 27 May 2026 ‡ National team caps and goals as of 8 October 2026

Roman Macek (born 18 April 1997) is a Czech professional footballer who plays as a midfielder for Sparta Prague and the Czech Republic national team.

== Club career ==
He made his professional debut in the Serie B for Bari on 21 January 2017 in a game against Cittadella.

On 31 August 2018, he joined Lugano in the Swiss Super League on a season-long loan.

On 27 January 2019, Macek signed a contract with Lugano until 30 June 2022. On 24 August 2020, Macek signed a new contract with Lugano until 30 June 2025. On 25 August 2021, Lugano announced that they are forced to release Macek due to Swiss league regulations. However, in October 2021 he appeared for Lugano's reserve squad Team Ticino U21 that plays in the fourth-tier Swiss 1. Liga. On 30 October 2021, he suffered an ACL tear which kept him from playing for almost a year. He returned to the main Lugano squad in the 2022–23 season.

On 18 June 2025, Macek signed a contract with Mladá Boleslav as a free agent.

On 31 July 2026, Macek signed a contract with Sparta Prague.

== International career ==
On 29 September 2026, Macek made his debut for the Czech Republic national team in a 2026–27 UEFA Nations League A game against England.
