= Uran Bislimi =

Swiss footballer (born 1999)

Personal information
- Date of birth: 25 September 1999 (age 27)
- Place of birth: Basel, Switzerland
- Height: 1.83 m (6 ft 0 in)
- Position: Midfielder

Team information
- Current team: Lugano
- Number: 25

Youth career
- –2015: Concordia Basel
- 2015–2017: Basel

Senior career*
Years	Team	Apps	(Gls)
2017–2019	Basel U21	42	(3)
2019–2022	Schaffhausen	86	(6)
2022–	Lugano	138	(17)

International career^{‡}
2018	Switzerland U19	1	(0)
2022	Kosovo	2	(1)
2023	Switzerland	2	(0)
- * Club domestic league appearances and goals as of 28 September 2026 ‡ National team caps and goals as of 12 September 2023

Uran Bislimi (born 25 September 1999) is a Swiss professional footballer who plays as a midfielder for Swiss club Lugano. A former youth international for Switzerland and Kosovo, he played for the Kosovo national team in a pair of friendlies before switching back to play for the Switzerland national team.

== Club career ==
=== Lugano ===
On 19 July 2022, Bislimi signed a four-year contract with Swiss Super League club Lugano. Five days later, he made his debut in a 2–1 away defeat against Grasshoppers after coming on as a substitute at 72nd minute in place of Mattia Bottani.

== International career ==
=== Switzerland ===
In March 2018, Bislimi became part of Switzerland U19 with whom he made his debut in a 2–2 home draw against Finland U19 after being named in the starting line-up.

=== Kosovo ===
On 2 September 2019, Bislimi received a call-up from Kosovo U21 for the 2021 UEFA European Under-21 Championship qualification match against England U21, but he was an unused substitute in that match.

Bislimi was planned to be called up from Kosovo in September 2022 for 2022–23 UEFA Nations League matches against Northern Ireland and Cyprus, but he declined to be part of the national team as he wanted to focus on playing at club level. On 11 November 2022, he accepted a call-up from Kosovo for the friendly matches against Armenia and Faroe Islands. His debut with Kosovo came five days later in a friendly match against Armenia after being named in the starting line-up. Three days after debut, Bislimi scored his first goal for Kosovo in his second appearance for the country in a 1–1 home draw over Faroe Islands.

We need players who feel this team, this country, but Bislimi is not one of them. He has closed the door to himself in Kosovo, for him there is no longer a key, he will now look at other options, he is no longer part of us.

— The opinion of the head coach of Kosovo, Alain Giresse about Bislimi's dilemma.

On 20 March 2023, Kosovo manager Bajram Shala during the media conference before the UEFA Euro 2024 qualifying matches against Israel and Andorra said that Bislimi still has dilemmas about which national team he will play for and so we have decided that this player will no longer have a place in the national team.

=== Return to Switzerland ===
On 31 May 2023, Bislimi was named as part of the Switzerland's reserve squad for the UEFA Euro 2024 qualifying matches against Andorra and Romania. Nine days later, he was included in the finalized Switzerland squad for the UEFA Euro 2024 qualifying matches against Andorra and Romania to replace the injured Breel Embolo. On 19 June 2023, Bislimi made his debut with Switzerland in the UEFA Euro 2024 qualifying match against Romania after coming on as a substitute at last minutes in place of Xherdan Shaqiri.

== Career statistics ==
No.	Date	Venue	Opponent	Score	Result	Competition
Kosovo goals
1.	19 November 2022	Fadil Vokrri Stadium, Pristina, Kosovo	Faroe Islands	1–0	1–1	Friendly
