= Kreshnik Hajrizi =

Kosovan footballer (born 1999)

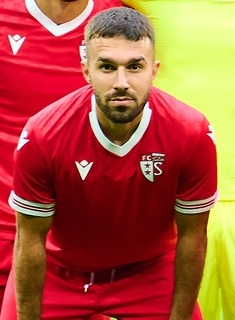
- Hajrizi with Sion in 2025

Personal information
- Full name: Kreshnik Hajrizi
- Date of birth: 28 May 1999 (age 27)
- Place of birth: Sierre, Switzerland
- Height: 1.85 m (6 ft 1 in)
- Position: Centre-back

Team information
- Current team: Sion
- Number: 28

Youth career
- 2007–2012: FC Chippis
- 2012–2014: FC Saxon
- 2014–2017: Young Boys

Senior career*
Years	Team	Apps	(Gls)
2017–2019	Young Boys U21	45	(1)
2019–2021	Chiasso	55	(1)
2021–2024	Lugano	71	(4)
2024–2025	Widzew Łódź	4	(0)
2025	→ Sion (loan)	15	(2)
2025–	Sion	34	(1)

International career^{‡}
2015–2016	Switzerland U17	12	(2)
2018–2020	Kosovo U21	7	(0)
2022–	Kosovo	9	(1)
- * Club domestic league appearances and goals as of 26 May 2026 ‡ National team caps and goals as of 23:42, 17 November 2026 (UTC)

Kreshnik Hajrizi (born 28 May 1999) is a professional footballer who plays as a centre-back for Swiss Super League club Sion. Born in Switzerland, he plays for the Kosovo national team.

== Club career ==
=== Chiasso ===
On 19 June 2019, Hajrizi joined Swiss Challenge League side Chiasso. One month later, he made his debut in a 0–1 home defeat against Wil after coming on as a substitute at 74th minute in place of Ivan Lurati.

=== Lugano ===
On 25 March 2021, Hajrizi via a photo on his official Instagram account announces that from the 2021–22 season, he will be part of the Swiss Super League club Lugano. Four months later, he made his debut in a 0–2 home defeat against Zürich after being named in the starting line-up.

=== Widzew Łódź ===
On 17 June 2024, Hajrizi joined Polish Ekstraklasa side Widzew Łódź after agreeing to a two-year deal with a one-year extension option and received squad number 5.

=== Sion ===
On 15 January 2025, he returned to Switzerland to join Sion on loan for the remainder of the season, with an option to buy. In June 2025, Sion exercised Hajrizi's buyout clause.

== International career ==
=== Youth ===
During the 2015–16 season, Hajrizi has been part of Switzerland at youth international level, respectively part of national under-17 team and he played twelve games with this team and scored two goals. On 4 October 2018, he received a call-up from Kosovo U21 for the 2019 UEFA European Under-21 Championship qualification match against Israel U21, and made his debut after coming on as a substitute at 46th minute in place of Fuad Rahimi.

=== Senior ===
On 11 November 2022, Hajrizi received a call-up from Kosovo for the friendly matches against Armenia and Faroe Islands. His debut with Kosovo came eight days later in a friendly match against Faroe Islands after being named in the starting line-up.

== Personal life ==
Hajrizi was born in Switzerland to ethnic Albanian parents from Shtime.

== Career statistics ==
=== Club ===
As of match played 22 May 2025

Appearances and goals by club, season and competition
Club	Season	League			National cup (Note: Includes Swiss Cup, Polish Cup)		Other		Total	
Club	Season	Division	Apps	Goals	Apps	Goals	Apps	Goals	Apps	Goals
Young Boys U21	2016–17	Swiss 1. Liga	1	0	0	0	—		1	0
Young Boys U21	2017–18	Swiss 1. Liga	22	0	0	0	2 (Note: Appearances in Swiss 1. Liga play-offs)	0	24	0
Young Boys U21	2018–19	Swiss 1. Liga	22	1	0	0	—		22	1
Young Boys U21	Total		45	1	0	0	2	0	47	1
Chiasso	2019–20	Swiss Challenge League	26	0	1	0	—		27	0
Chiasso	2020–21	Swiss Challenge League	29	1	1	0	—		30	1
Chiasso	Total		55	1	2	0	—		57	1
Lugano	2021–22	Swiss Super League	30	1	4	0	—		34	1
Lugano	2022–23	Swiss Super League	19	1	2	0	—		21	1
Lugano	2023–24	Swiss Super League	22	2	2	0	8 (Note: Two appearances in UEFA Europa League, six appearances in UEFA Europa Conference League)	0	32	2
Lugano	Total		71	4	8	0	8	0	87	4
Widzew Łódź	2024–25	Ekstraklasa	4	0	2	0	—		6	0
Sion (loan)	2024–25	Swiss Super League	15	2	—		—		15	2
Career total			190	8	12	0	10	0	212	8

=== International ===
As of match played 17 November 2026

Appearances and goals by national team and year
National team	Year	Apps	Goals
Kosovo	2022	1	0
Kosovo	2023	3	0
Kosovo	2024	0	0
Kosovo	2025	1	0
Kosovo	2026	4	1
Total		9	1

Scores and results list Kosovo's goal tally first, score column indicates score after each Hajrizi goal.

List of international goals scored by Kreshnik Hajrizi
No.	Date	Venue	Opponent	Score	Result	Competition
1	26 March 2026	Tehelné pole, Bratislava, Slovakia	Slovakia	1–1	4–3	2026 FIFA World Cup qualification

== Honours ==
Lugano

- Swiss Cup: 2021–22
