= Giambattista Pastorello =

Italian businessman (born 1944)

Giambattista Pastorello (born 7 November 1944) is an Italian businessman.

== Career ==
Pastorello was most known for being the president of Italian Serie A side Verona.
