= Shkelqim Vladi =

Footballer (born 2000)

Personal information
- Date of birth: 21 September 2000 (age 26)
- Place of birth: Thun, Switzerland
- Height: 1.84 m (6 ft 0 in)
- Position: Forward

Team information
- Current team: Aarau
- Number: 10

Youth career
- Rot-Schwarz Thun
- –2008: Dürrenast
- 2008–2014: Thun
- 2014–2018: Young Boys

Senior career*
Years	Team	Apps	(Gls)
2018–2021	Young Boys U21	28	(16)
2021–2022	Young Boys	0	(0)
2021	→ Yverdon (loan)	18	(2)
2022	→ Aarau (loan)	10	(4)
2022–2023	Aarau	25	(15)
2023–2026	Lugano	55	(10)
2025–2026	→ St. Gallen (loan)	12	(1)
2026	→ Aarau (loan)	17	(11)
2026–	Aarau	3	(2)
- * Club domestic league appearances and goals as of 28 September 2026 ‡ National team caps and goals as of 6 October 2023

Shkelqim Vladi (born 21 September 2000) is a professional footballer who plays as a forward for Swiss Challenge League club Aarau. Born in Switzerland, he represents Kosovo at international level.

== Club career ==
On 23 June 2023, Vladi signed a four-year contract with Swiss Super League club Lugano. His debut with Lugano came on 26 July against Stade Lausanne Ouchy after coming on as a substitute at 71st minute in place of Renato Steffen. Eighteen days after debut, he scored his first goal for Lugano in his fourth appearance for the club in a 6–1 home win over his former club Yverdon in Swiss Super League.

On 29 July 2025, Vladi moved on loan to St. Gallen, with an option to buy. On 19 January 2026, Vladi returned to Aarau on loan.

== International career ==
On 16 September 2022, Vladi received a call-up from Kosovo for the 2022–23 UEFA Nations League matches against Northern Ireland and Cyprus, but due to injury, could not be part of the national team. On 6 October 2023, he received again a call-up from Kosovo for the UEFA Euro 2024 qualifying matches against Andorra and Israel, but due to injury, could not be part of the national team again.
