= Mattia Bottani =

Swiss footballer (born 1991)

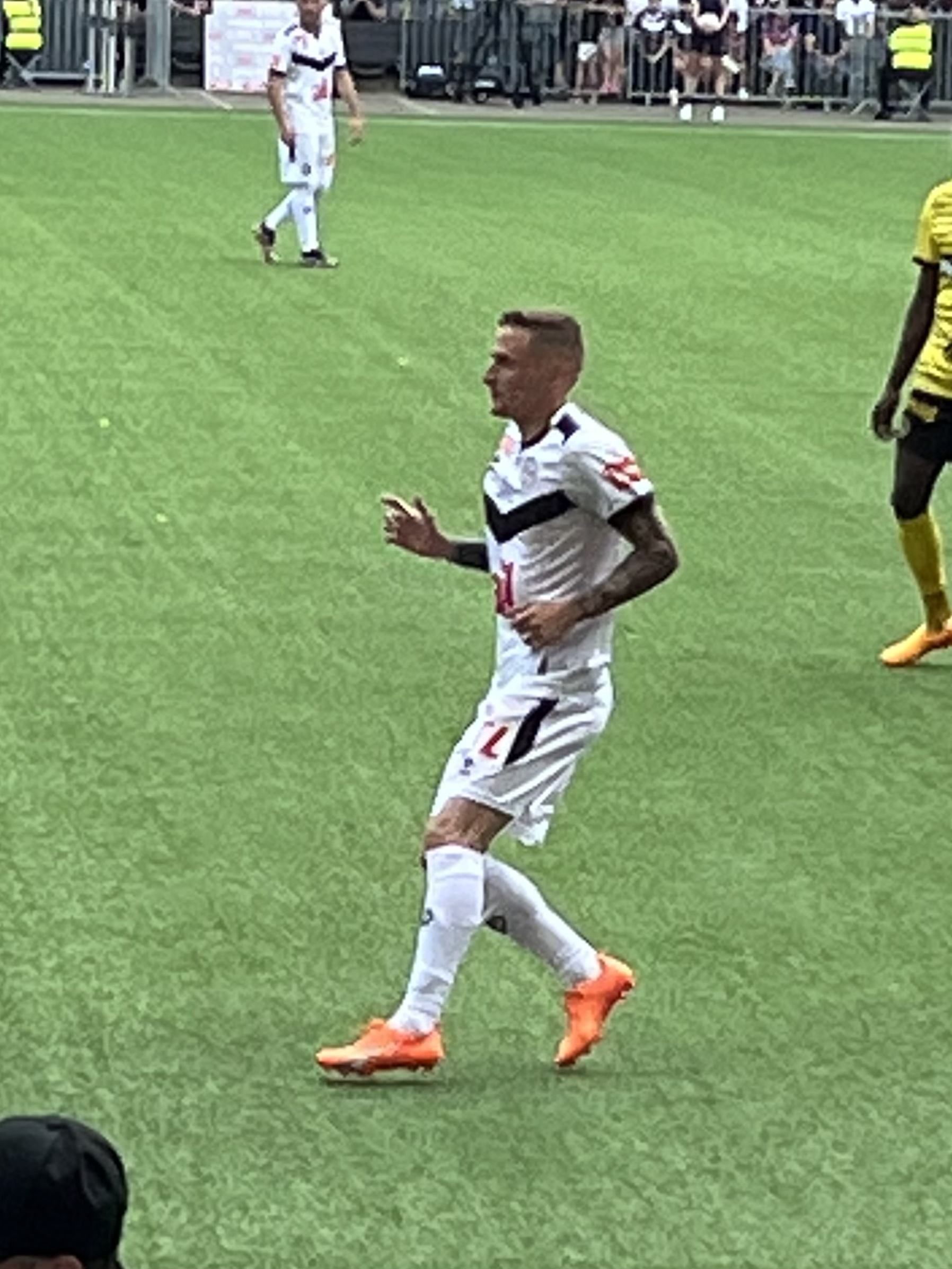

Personal information
- Date of birth: 24 May 1991 (age 35)
- Place of birth: Lugano, Switzerland
- Height: 1.70 m (5 ft 7 in)
- Position: Left midfielder

Senior career*
Years	Team	Apps	(Gls)
2009–2011	Lugano	1	(0)
2011–2012	Genoa	0	(0)
2011–2012	→ Lugano (loan)	16	(2)
2012–2016	Lugano	100	(17)
2016–2017	Wil	25	(3)
2017–2026	Lugano	221	(22)

International career
2022–	Switzerland	1	(0)
- * Club domestic league appearances and goals as of 26 May 2026

Mattia Bottani (born 24 May 1991) is a Swiss professional footballer who plays as a left midfielder.

== Career ==
On 15 May 2022, Bottani scored a goal in Lugano's 4–1 victory over St. Gallen in the final of the Swiss Cup. In 2016, during the final of the Swiss Cup against FC Zurich, on the 0-0, he missed a penalty who would allow the club to win the competition (final result: 1-0 for FC Zurich).

== Honours ==
Lugano

- Swiss Cup: 2021–22
