= Mattia Zanotti =

Italian footballer (born 2003)

Personal information
- Full name: Mattia Zanotti
- Date of birth: 11 January 2003 (age 23)
- Place of birth: Brescia, Italy
- Height: 1.75 m (5 ft 9 in)
- Position: Right-back

Team information
- Current team: Lugano
- Number: 46

Youth career
- 2009–2011: Virtus Feralpi Lonato
- 2011–2017: Brescia
- 2017–2023: Inter Milan

Senior career*
Years	Team	Apps	(Gls)
2021–2024	Inter Milan	3	(0)
2023–2024	→ St. Gallen (loan)	34	(3)
2024–	Lugano	65	(1)

International career^{‡}
2018	Italy U15	4	(0)
2018–2019	Italy U16	9	(0)
2019–2020	Italy U17	4	(0)
2021–2022	Italy U19	5	(0)
2022–2023	Italy U20	11	(0)
2023–2025	Italy U21	18	(0)
Medal record
Men's football
Representing Italy
FIFA U-20 World Cup
Runner-up	2023 Argentina
- * Club domestic league appearances and goals as of 28 September 2026 ‡ National team caps and goals as of 22 June 2025

Mattia Zanotti (born 11 January 2003) is an Italian professional footballer who plays as a right-back for Swiss Super League club Lugano.

== Club career ==
Zanotti played for Virtus Feralpi Lonato and Brescia, before joining Inter Milan's youth academy in 2017. In October 2021, Zanotti signed a four-year professional contract with the Nerazzurri.

On 12 December 2021, he made his Serie A debut for Inter Milan, coming on as a substitute in the 83rd minute of a 4–0 league win over Cagliari.

Shortly after extending his contract with the club until 2027, on 3 July 2023, Zanotti officially joined Swiss Super League club St. Gallen on a season-long loan. On 22 July, he made his debut for the club in a 2–1 league win over Basel. On 28 October, he scored his first professional goal and served two assists in a 3–1 league win over Grasshoppers. Throughout the season, he helped St. Gallen qualify for the second qualifying round of the UEFA Conference League.

On 13 July 2024, Zanotti joined Swiss Super League club Lugano on a permanent deal, signing a four-year contract.

== International career ==
Zanotti is a youth international for Italy, having represented the Italy U15s, U16s, U17s and U19s.

In May 2023, he was included in the Italy U20 squad that took part in the FIFA U-20 World Cup in Argentina, where the Azzurrini finished runners-up after losing to Uruguay in the final match.

On 8 September 2023, he made his debut for the Italy under-21 national team, starting in a goalless draw against Latvia in the 2025 UEFA European Under-21 Championship qualifiers.

== Honours ==
Inter Milan

- Supercoppa Italiana: 2022

Italy U20

- FIFA U-20 World Cup runner-up: 2023
