= Mattia Croci-Torti =

Swiss footballer and manager (born 1982)

Personal information
- Date of birth: 10 April 1982 (age 44)
- Place of birth: Chiasso, Switzerland
- Height: 1.78 m (5 ft 10 in)
- Position: Right-back

Team information
- Current team: Lugano (manager)

Youth career
- Morbio
- Chiasso
- Grasshoppers
- Malcantone Agno

Senior career*
Years	Team	Apps	(Gls)
1999–2000	Chiasso	26	(0)
2000–2002	Grasshoppers II	32	(2)
2002–2004	Malcantone Agno	52	(2)
2004–2005	Lugano	27	(0)
2005	Biaschesi	16	(1)
2006	Wil	15	(0)
2006–2010	Lugano	61	(2)
2008–2014	Chiasso	98	(3)

Managerial career
- 2013–2015: Chiasso (assistant)
- 2015–2016: Balerna
- 2017–2018: Lugano (assistant)
- 2018: Mendrisio
- 2018–2021: Lugano (assistant)
- 2021–: Lugano
- * Club domestic league appearances and goals

Mattia Croci-Torti (born 10 April 1982) is a Swiss professional football manager and former player, who currently manages Lugano.

== Club career ==
Croci-Torti spent his entire playing career between the Swiss 1. Liga and Swiss Challenge League. He began his career with Chiasso in 1999, and ended his career with them in 2014, representing various other clubs from Ticino in between.

== Managerial career ==
After retiring as a footballer, Croci-Torti returned to Chiasso as assistant manager from 2013 to 2015. He became the manager of the club Balerna in 2015, before moving to Lugano as assistant from 2017 to 2021, only interrupted by a short stint as Mendrisio manager in 2018. On 1 September 2021, he was named the manager of Lugano in the Swiss Super League replacing Abel Braga. He helped Lugano win the Swiss Cup on 15 May 2022, 29 years since the club last won the trophy.

=== Managerial Statistics ===
As of 21 November 2026

Team	From	To	Record				
Team	From	To	G	W	D	L	Win %
Mendrisio	July 2018	September 2018	8	0	1	7	0.00
Lugano	September 2021	Present	256	129	52	75	50.39

== Honours ==
Lugano

- Swiss Cup: 2021–22
