= Anto Grgić =

Swiss footballer (born 1996)

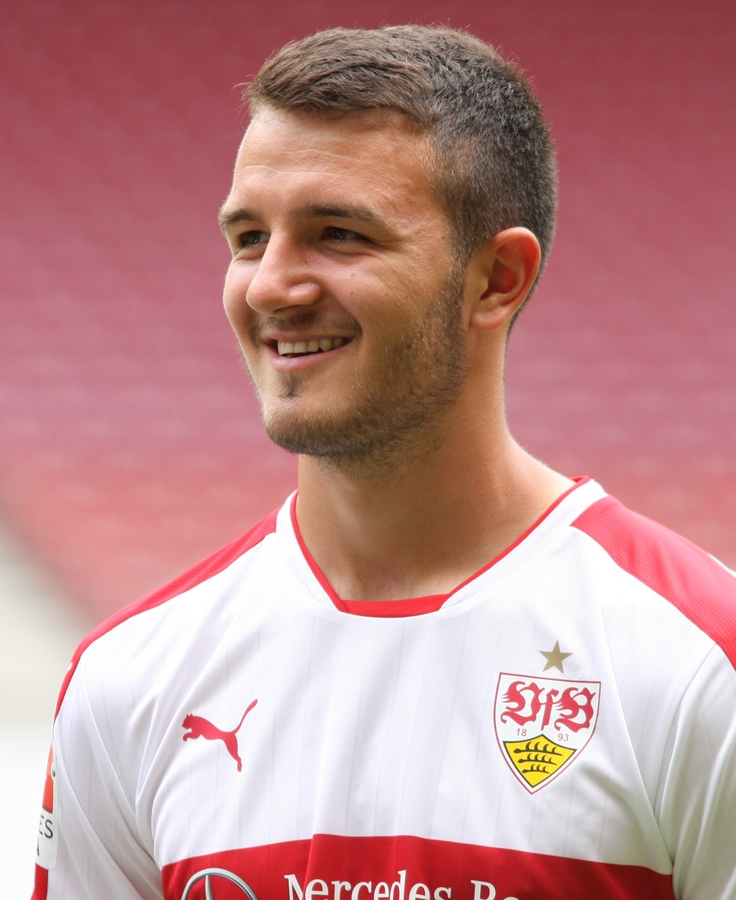
- Grgić in 2016 with VfB Stuttgart

Personal information
- Date of birth: 28 November 1996 (age 29)
- Place of birth: Schlieren, Switzerland
- Height: 1.88 m (6 ft 2 in)
- Position: Midfielder

Team information
- Current team: Lugano
- Number: 8

Youth career
- –2009: Grasshoppers
- 2009–2015: FC Zürich

Senior career*
Years	Team	Apps	(Gls)
2015–2016	FC Zürich	24	(4)
2016–2019	VfB Stuttgart	15	(0)
2016–2017	VfB Stuttgart II	10	(2)
2018–2019	→ Sion (loan)	34	(5)
2019–2023	Sion	128	(20)
2023–	Lugano	107	(17)

International career
2011	Switzerland U15	4	(0)
2011–2012	Switzerland U16	6	(1)
2012–2013	Switzerland U17	11	(3)
2013	Switzerland U18	2	(1)
2015	Switzerland U19	3	(0)
2015	Switzerland U20	2	(2)
2016–2018	Switzerland U21	7	(0)
- * Club domestic league appearances and goals as of 28 September 2026

Anto Grgić (Croatian pronunciation: [ǎːnto ɡř̩ːɡitɕ, - ɡr̩̂-]; born 28 November 1996) is a Swiss professional footballer who plays as a midfielder for FC Lugano.

== Club career ==
On 13 July 2016, Grgić moved to VfB Stuttgart and signed a contract until June 2020 with the German club.

On 11 January 2018, he was loaned out to FC Sion until June 2019.

In May 2019, Sion announced the permanent signing of Grgić from Stuttgart on a contract until 2022.

On 1 July 2023, Grgić moved to FC Lugano on a free transfer, following FC Sion's relegation to the Challenge League.

== International career ==
Grgić was born in Switzerland in a family of Croatian descent. He is a youth international for Switzerland.

== Career statistics ==
As of match played 29 May 2019

Appearances and goals by club, season and competition
Club	Season	League			National Cup		Other		Total	
Club	Season	Division	Apps	Goals	Apps	Goals	Apps	Goals	Apps	Goals
FC Zürich	2015–16	Swiss Super League	24	4	4	1	1 (Note: Appearance in the Europa League)	0	29	5
VfB Stuttgart	2016–17	2. Bundesliga	14	0	0	0	—		14	0
VfB Stuttgart	2017–18	Bundesliga	1	0	1	0	—		2	0
VfB Stuttgart	Total		15	0	1	0	0	0	16	0
VfB Stuttgart II	2016–17	Regionalliga Südwest	6	2	—		—		6	2
VfB Stuttgart II	2017–18	Regionalliga Südwest	4	0	—		—		4	0
VfB Stuttgart II	Total		10	2	—		—		10	2
Sion (loan)	2017–18	Swiss Super League	14	1	—		—		14	1
Sion (loan)	2018–19	Swiss Super League	20	4	2	1	—		22	5
Sion (loan)	Total		34	5	2	1	—		36	6
Career total			83	11	7	2	1	0	91	13

== Honours ==
FC Zürich

- Swiss Cup: 2015–16
