= Martim Marques =

Portuguese footballer

Personal information
- Full name: Martim Alexandre Costa Marques
- Date of birth: 11 February 2004 (age 22)
- Place of birth: Vila Nova de Gaia, Portugal
- Height: 1.73 m (5 ft 8 in)
- Position: Left-back

Team information
- Current team: Lugano
- Number: 26

Youth career
- 2010–2011: AD Oiã
- 2011–2022: Sporting CP

Senior career*
| Years | Team | Apps | (Gls) |
| 2022–2023 | Sporting CP B | 1 | (0) |
| 2023– | Lugano | 60 | (3) |
| 2023– | Lugano II | 6 | (0) |

International career^{‡}
| 2021–2022 | Portugal U18 | 11 | (0) |
| 2022–2023 | Portugal U19 | 12 | (0) |
| 2023– | Portugal U20 | 5 | (1) |
Medal record
Men's football
Representing Portugal
UEFA European Under-19 Championship
| Runner-up | 2023 Malta |
- * Club domestic league appearances and goals as of 28 September 2026 ‡ National team caps and goals as of 17:58, 21 November 2023 (UTC)

Martim Alexandre Costa Marques (born 11 February 2004) is a Portuguese professional footballer who plays as a left-back for Swiss Super League club Lugano.

== Career ==
Marques began playing football with AD Oiã before moving to Sporting CP's youth academy in 2011. He worked his way up their youth academy, and on 4 August 2020 signed his first professional contract with them. He played for Sporting's B team once, in 2022. On 7 June 2023, Marques announced his departure from the club after 13 years with the Lions.

On 13 June 2023, Marques signed a four-year contract with Swiss Super League club FC Lugano, for a fee of €300.000. He made his debut for Lugano in a 3–0 Swiss Cup win over Grand-Lancy FC on 16 September 2023.

== International career ==
Marques is a youth international for Portugal. He was part of the Portugal U19s that came in second for the 2023 UEFA European Under-19 Championship.
