= FC Lugano =

Swiss association football club

Lugano
- Full name: Football Club Lugano
- Nicknames: Bianconeri (Black and White); V bianche (White Vs)
- Founded: 28 July 1908; 118 years ago
- Ground: AIL Arena, Lugano, Switzerland
- Capacity: 8,093
- Owner: Joe Mansueto
- Chairman: Philippe Regazzoni
- Manager: Mattia Croci-Torti
- League: Swiss Super League
- 2025–26: Swiss Super League, 3rd of 12
- Website: www.fclugano.com
Home colours	Away colours	Third colours

Football Club Lugano is a Swiss professional football club based in Lugano. The club was refounded as AC Lugano in 2004 as a result of relegation and the financial situation of FC Lugano, which was founded in 1908. In 2008, the club reverted to its original name, FC Lugano. They play at the AIL Arena. They have played in what is now the Swiss Super League during the periods of 1922–53, 1954–60, 1961–63, 1964–76, 1979–80, 1988–97, 1998–02, and from 2015 until present.

== History ==
Former club crest

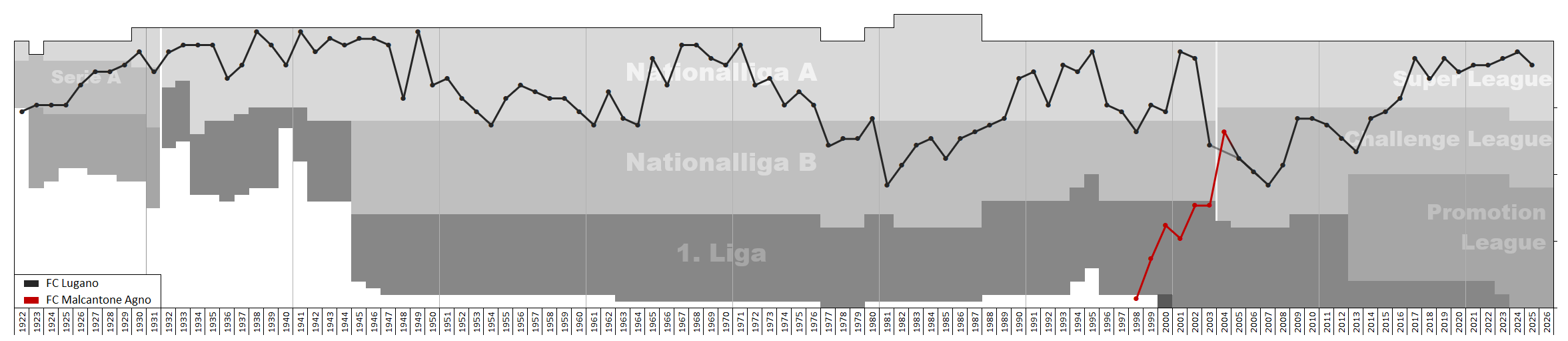
Chart of FC Lugano table positions in the Swiss football league system

Football Club Lugano was formed on 28 July 1908 under the leadership of then-president Ernesto Corsini. Promotion to the highest Swiss Super League came for the first time in 1922, and after several years of relegations and promotions, the team won its first Swiss Cup in 1931. The following decade, FC Lugano was able to win 3 national titles (1938, 1941 and 1949).

For the first fifty years of its existence, Lugano played at the Campo Marzio – which opened on 13 September 1908 – but its success prompted the city to build a new stadium, and so on 26 August 1951, the Cornaredo Stadium was inaugurated, which has a capacity of 15,000.

In 1968, Lugano won the Swiss Cup and hence the team participated in the Cup Winners' Cup. Two years later the team took part in the UEFA Cup.

In 1993, Lugano won its third Cup against Grasshoppers, later participating in the Cup Winners' Cup, in which it reached second qualifying round. In the 1995–96 season, Lugano participated in the UEFA Cup, eliminating Jeunesse Hautcharage in the first round and Inter Milan in the second.

The club was declared bankrupt in 2003 and forcibly removed from the league. Due to the bankruptcy, the team was renamed AC Lugano and fielded under-21 players, having been forced to sell or release the senior team to pay off the club's debts. In 2004, the club merged with Malcantone Agno, and it was decided that Lugano would re-enter the Swiss football system in the Swiss Challenge League. Morotti Joseph, the president of Malcantone Agno, was entrusted with the leadership of the new club.

In 2007, the company was bought by a group led by Giambattista Pastorello. Luido Bernasconi became the new president. On 4 June 2008, the club's centenary year, the general meeting of shareholders voted on a name change. The historical name of Football Club Lugano was reinstated. In 2015 FC Lugano was promoted to the Swiss Super League.

On 18 August 2021, it was announced that American billionaire and owner of the Chicago Fire FC, Joe Mansueto, had purchased FC Lugano and that the Fire and FC Lugano were to work together as sister clubs. On 1 September 2021, assistant coach Mattia Croci-Torti took over coaching duties at the club, replacing Abel Braga. The first season under new ownership would immediately prove successful, as they were able to win their first title after 29 years, winning the 2021–22 Swiss Cup. A year later, they failed to defend the cup title, losing 2–3 in the exciting final to Swiss champions Young Boys.

The 2025–26 season has been the last played at Cornaredo stadium. Following its conclusion, FC Lugano relocates to the newly built AIL Arena, situated next to the existing stadium, which is scheduled for demolition.

== European record ==
Season	Competition	Round	Opponent	Home	Away	Aggregate
1968–69	European Cup Winners' Cup	First round	(Spain) Barcelona	0–1	0–3	0–4
1971–72	UEFA Cup	First round	(Poland) Legia Warsaw	1–3	0–0	1–3
1993–94	European Cup Winners' Cup	Qualifying round	(Belarus) Neman Grodno	5–0	1–2	6–2
1993–94	European Cup Winners' Cup	First round	(Spain) Real Madrid	1–3	0–3	1–6
1995–96	UEFA Cup	Preliminary round	(Luxembourg) Jeunesse Esch	4–0	0–0	4–0
1995–96	UEFA Cup	First round	(Italy) Inter Milan	1–1	1–0	2–1
1995–96	UEFA Cup	Second round	(Czech Republic) Slavia Prague	1–2	0–1	1–3
2001–02	UEFA Champions League	Second qualifying round	(Ukraine) Shakhtar Donetsk	2–1	0–3	2–4
2002–03	UEFA Cup	Qualifying round	(Latvia) FK Ventspils	1–0	0–3	1–3
2017–18	UEFA Europa League	Group G	(Israel) Hapoel Be'er Sheva	1–0	1–2	3rd
2017–18	UEFA Europa League	Group G	(Romania) FCSB	1–2	2–1	3rd
2017–18	UEFA Europa League	Group G	(Czech Republic) Viktoria Plzeň	3–2	1–4	3rd
2019–20	UEFA Europa League	Group B	(Ukraine) Dynamo Kyiv	0–0	1–1	4th
2019–20	UEFA Europa League	Group B	(Denmark) Copenhagen	0–1	0–1	4th
2019–20	UEFA Europa League	Group B	(Sweden) Malmö FF	0–0	1–2	4th
2022–23	UEFA Europa Conference League	Third qualifying round	(Israel) Hapoel Be'er Sheva	0–2	1–3	1–5
2023–24	UEFA Europa League	Play-off round	(Belgium) Union Saint-Gilloise	0–1	0–2	0–3
2023–24	UEFA Europa Conference League	Group D	(Belgium) Club Brugge	1–3	0–2	4th
2023–24	UEFA Europa Conference League	Group D	(Norway) Bodø/Glimt	0–0	2–5	4th
2023–24	UEFA Europa Conference League	Group D	(Turkey) Beşiktaş	0–2	3–2	4th
2024–25	UEFA Champions League	Second qualifying round	(Turkey) Fenerbahçe	3–4	1–2	4–6
2024–25	UEFA Europa League	Third qualifying round	(Serbia) Partizan	2–2 (a.e.t.)	1–0	3–2
2024–25	UEFA Europa League	Play-off round	(Turkey) Beşiktaş	3–3	1–5	4–8
2024–25	UEFA Europa Conference League	League Phase	(Finland) HJK	3–0	–	6th
2024–25	UEFA Europa Conference League	League Phase	(Czech Republic) Mladá Boleslav	–	1–0	6th
2024–25	UEFA Europa Conference League	League Phase	(Serbia) TSC	–	1–4	6th
2024–25	UEFA Europa Conference League	League Phase	(Belgium) Gent	2–0	–	6th
2024–25	UEFA Europa Conference League	League Phase	(Poland) Legia Warsaw	–	2–1	6th
2024–25	UEFA Europa Conference League	League Phase	(Cyprus) Pafos	2–2	–	6th
2024–25	UEFA Europa Conference League	Round of 16	(Slovenia) Celje	5–4 (a.e.t.)	0–1	5–5 (1–3 p)
2025–26	UEFA Europa League	Second qualifying round	(Romania) CFR Cluj	0–0	0–1 (a.e.t.)	0–1
2025–26	UEFA Conference League	Third qualifying round	(Slovenia) Celje	0–5	4–2	4–7
2026–27	UEFA Conference League	Second qualifying round	(Kosovo) Dukagjini	1–0	5–1	6–1
2026–27	UEFA Conference League	Third qualifying round	(Faroe Islands) NSÍ	2–0	2–2	4–2
2026–27	UEFA Conference League	Play-off round	(Israel) Maccabi Tel Aviv	2–1	1–1	3–2

== Players ==
=== Current squad ===
As of 14 September 2026

Note: Flags indicate national team as defined under FIFA eligibility rules; some limited exceptions apply. Players may hold more than one non-FIFA nationality.

No.	Pos.	Nation	Player
2	DF	UZB	Bekhruz Karimov
3	DF	HAI	Hannes Delcroix
4	DF	SUI	Damian Kelvin
6	DF	GER	Antonios Papadopoulos
7	MF	MKD	Ezgjan Alioski
8	MF	SUI	Anto Grgić
9	FW	SUI	Albian Ajeti (on loan from Basel)
11	MF	SUI	Renato Steffen
14	MF	ALG	Ahmed Kendouci
16	GK	SUI	David von Ballmoos
17	DF	GER	Lars Lukas Mai
18	DF	SUI	Joel Bichsel
19	MF	ITA	Claudio Cassano (on loan from Chicago Fire)
21	MF	FRA	Yanis Cimignani
22	FW	COL	Beckham Castro
23	MF	SWE	Gjan Ajdin

No.	Pos.	Nation	Player
24	MF	SWE	Elias Pihlström
25	MF	SUI	Uran Bislimi
26	DF	POR	Martim Marques
27	MF	SUI	Daniel Dos Santos
28	GK	GER	Felix Gebhardt
30	FW	HON	Dereck Moncada
31	MF	SUI	Jason Parente
32	FW	SUI	Nicolò Puddu
33	FW	SUI	Christian Raffa
36	FW	SUI	Bryan Zurmühle
37	FW	SUI	Ian Tiraboschi
44	DF	BRA	João Carbone
46	DF	ITA	Mattia Zanotti
91	FW	GER	Kevin Behrens
99	GK	SUI	Diego Mina

=== Out on loan ===
Note: Flags indicate national team as defined under FIFA eligibility rules; some limited exceptions apply. Players may hold more than one non-FIFA nationality.

No. / Pos. / Nation / Player; — / GK / GRE / Fotios Pseftis (at Antalyaspor until 30 June 2027)	No. / Pos. / Nation / Player; — / MF / MKD / Ilija Maslarov (at Rapperswil-Jona until 30 June 2027)

== Honours ==
- Swiss Super League
  - Champions (3): 1937–38, 1940–41, 1948–49
  - Runners-up (6): 1942–43, 1944–45, 1945–46, 1994–95, 2000–01, 2023–24
- Swiss Cup
  - Winners (4): 1930–31, 1967–68, 1992–93, 2021–22
  - Runners-up (7): 1942–43, 1951–52, 1970–71, 1991–92, 2015–16, 2022–23, 2023–24
- Swiss Challenge League
  - Winners (4): 1960–61, 1963–64, 1987–88, 2014–15
  - Runners-up (5): 1978–79, 1997–98, 2008–09, 2009–10, 2013–14
- Swiss Super League Fair Play Awards (1): 2021–22

== Former coaches ==
- 1937–41: József Winkler
- 1947–50: Béla Volentik
- 1951–52: Tullio Grassi
- 1952–53: Béla Volentik
- 1953–55: Béla Sárosi
- 1957–58: Ragnar Larsen
- 1959–60: Tullio Grassi
- 1962–63: György Sárosi
- 1970–71: Albert Sing
- 1971–73: Otto Luttrop
- 1973–74: Otto Luttrop
- 1974–75: Alfredo Foni
- 1976–77: Alfredo Foni
- 1977–79: Oscar Massei
- 1979–80: Istvan Szabo
- 1980–81: Antun Rudinski
- 1983–85: Otto Luttrop
- 1992–94: Karl Engel
- 1997–98: Karl Engel
- 1999: Enzo Trossero
- 1999–2000: Giuliano Sonzogni
- 2002–03: Pierluigi Tami
- 2004–05: Vladimir Petković
- 2007–10: Simone Boldini
- 2010–11: Marco Schällibaum
- 2011–12: Francesco Moriero
- 2012–13: Raimondo Ponte
- 2013: Sandro Salvioni
- 2013–15: Livio Bordoli
- 2015–16: Zdeněk Zeman
- 2016: Andrea Manzo
- 2016–17: Paolo Tramezzani
- 2017–18: Pierluigi Tami
- 2018: Guille Abascal
- 2018–19: Fabio Celestini
- 2019–21: Maurizio Jacobacci
- 2021: Abel Braga
- 2021–present: Mattia Croci-Torti

== Coaching staff ==
Position	Name
Owner	(United States) Joe Mansueto
Chairman	(Switzerland) Philippe Regazzoni
CEO	(Switzerland) Martin Blaser
Chief Sports Officer	(Germany) Sebastian Plezer
Chief People & Culture Officer	(Italy) Emanuela Fuoco
Chief Financial Officer	(Switzerland) Michele Campana
Chief Marketing & Communications Officer	(Switzerland) Andrea Ruberti
Chief Revenue Officer	(Switzerland) Giovanni Di Stefano
Media & Corporate Relations	(Switzerland) Marzio Mellini
Team coordinator	(Switzerland) Riccardo Rigamonti
Head coach	(Switzerland) Mattia Croci-Torti
Assistant coaches	(Switzerland) Piercesare Gallo (Switzerland) Saverio Valentini
Goalkeeper coach	(Switzerland) Enrico Rossi
Fitness coach	(Switzerland) Mirko Antonelli
Match analyst	(Switzerland) Salvatore Colucci
Performance coach	(Switzerland) Andrea Giudici
Team doctors	(Switzerland) Dr. Giuseppe Montini (Switzerland) Dr. Giampaolo Golinucci
Physiotherapists	(Switzerland) Nicolò Giovanninni (Switzerland) Vittorio Silvestri (Switzerland) Francesco Vialli (Switzerland) Pietro Simonetti
