= List of foreign Swiss Super League players =

This is a list about the foreign players who played in the Swiss Super League. To be in the list players must meet two criteria:

1. They must have to have played at list one game in the Swiss Super League
2. The players who were signed by a Super League club but played in lower categories and/or in European competition must not be in the list

In bold: players who are currently playing in the Swiss Super League after playing at least one match.

Swiss players born abroad are included, too.

== Swiss players born abroad ==
- (Kosovo) Almen Abdi – Zürich – 2003–09
- (Cameroon) Yvan Alounga – Luzern – 2020–22
- (United States) Nicholas Ammeter – Young Boys – 2021–22
- (Senegal) Patrick Baumann – Grasshopper, Zürich, Thun, Neuchâtel Xamax – 1998–2007
- (Kosovo) Valon Behrami – Lugano, Sion – 2002–03, 2019–20
- (Kosovo) Johan Berisha – Neuchâtel Xamax, Thun, Young Boys, Aarau – 1997–2007
- (Spain) Raúl Cabanas – Grasshopper – 2006–08
- (Turkey) Önder Çengel – Grasshopper, Thun – 2003–04, 2005–06
- (Portugal) Ambrosio Da Costa – Sion – 2016–17
- (Ivory Coast) Johan Djourou – Sion, Neuchâtel Xamax – 2019–20
- (Portugal) **Daniel Dos Santos** – **Lugano** – 2024–
- (England) Kwadwo Duah – Young Boys, St. Gallen – 2016–17, 2020–22
- (Bosnia and Herzegovina) Slaviša Dugić – Servette, Aarau, Yverdon-Sport – 2003–06
- (North Macedonia) Blerim Džemaili – Zürich – 2003–07, 2020–23
- (Cameroon) Breel Embolo – Basel – 2013–16
- (Nigeria) Innocent Emeghara – Grasshoppers – 2010–12
- (France) Norbert Eschmann – FC Lausanne-Sport, Servette, Sion, Young Boys 1951–54, 1955–58, 1963–67
- (Serbia) Sehar Fejzulahi – Aarau, Vaduz, Grasshopper – 2004–06, 2008–09, 2011–12
- (Kosovo) Beg Ferati – Basel, Sion 2007–11, 2013–14
- (Cape Verde) Gelson Fernandes – Sion 2005–07, 2012–13
- (Nepal) Roman Friedli – Yverdon Sport, Aarau, Young Boys, Thun – 1999–2008
- (Colombia) Alessandro Frigerio – Lugano, Bellinzona, Chiasso 1940–43, 1946–47, 1948–49
- (Portugal) Ulisses Garcia – Grasshopper, Young Boys – 2013–14, 2018–24
- (Spain) Lorenzo González – St. Gallen – 2020–21
- (Austria) Bernt Haas – Grasshopper, Basel, St. Gallen – 1994–2001, 2002–03, 2007–08
- (Bosnia and Herzegovina) Selver Hodžić – Luzern, Thun, Neuchâtel Xamax – 1999–2000, 2002–07, 2008–10
- (Germany) Olivier Jäckle – Aarau – 2013–15
- (Bosnia and Herzegovina) Eldin Jakupović – Grasshopper, Thun – 2004–06, 2007–09
- (Serbia) Goran Karanović – Luzern, Servette, St. Gallen – 2008–09, 2011–15
- (West Germany) Timm Klose – Thun – 2010–11
- (Argentina) Iván Knez – Luzern, Basel, Young Boys – 1994–2002, 2003–05
- (Bosnia and Herzegovina) Živko Kostadinović – Zürich – 2021–23
- (Bosnia and Herzegovina) Samir Kozarac – St. Gallen – 2006–07
- (Turkey) Baykal Kulaksızoğlu – Grasshopper, Thun, Basel, Young Boys, Aarau – 2001–06, 2007–10
- (Kosovo) Granit Lekaj – Winterthur – 2022–25
- (Zaire) Badile Lubamba – Luzern, Lugano, Neuchâtel Xamax – 1999–2002, 2005–06
- (Democratic Republic of the Congo) Christopher Lungoyi – Lugano, St. Gallen, Yverdon-Sport – 2019–22, 2023–24
- (Zaire) Mobulu M'Futi – Sion, Neuchâtel Xamax, Aarau, Servette – 1999–2005, 2007–10, 2011–12
- (Serbia) Boban Maksimović – Young Boys – 2003–05
- (Kosovo) Sokol Maliqi – Luzern – 2006–07
- (Angola) Neftali Manzambi – Basel – 2016–18
- (Croatia) Oliver Maric – Luzern, Schaffhausen – 1999–2003, 2004–06
- (North Macedonia) Admir Mehmedi – Zürich – 2008–12
- (Kosovo) Genc Mehmeti – Luzern, Bellinzona – 2002–03, 2006–07, 2008–10
- (Serbia) Elvir Melunović – Aarau, Servette, Grasshopper, Young Boys, Schaffhausen – 1996–2006
- (Bosnia and Herzegovina) Dragan Mihajlović – Bellinzona, Lugano – 2008–11, 2016–19
- (Serbia) Nikola Milosavljevic – Lugano, Sion – 2015–18
- (Serbia) Miloš Malenović – Grasshopper, St. Gallen, Neuchâtel Xamax – 2003–04, 2006–08
- (Cameroon) François Moubandje – Servette – 2011–13
- (Spain) Juan Manuel Muñoz – Neuchâtel Xamax – 2003–04, 2005–06
- (North Macedonia) Orhan Mustafi – Zürich, Basel, Aarau, Grasshopper – 2007–10, 2011–13
- (Cameroon) Freddy Mveng – Neuchâtel Xamax, Young Boys, FC Lausanne-Sport, Sion – 2009–12, 2013–14, 2016–20
- (Cameroon) Yvon Mvogo – Young Boys – 2013–17
- (Brazil) Yago Gomes do Nascimento – Vaduz – 2020–21
- (West Germany) Markus Neumayr – Thun, Vaduz, Luzern 2010–11, 2014–17
- (Bosnia and Herzegovina) Adrian Nikçi – Zürich, Thun, Young Boys – 2007–12, 2013–15
- (Zaire) Blaise Nkufo – FC Lausanne-Sport, Grasshopper, Lugano, Luzern – 1993–94, 1997–2001
- (Cameroon) Dimitri Oberlin – Zürich, Basel – 2013–14, 2017–20
- (France) Christophe Ohrel – FC Lausanne-Sport, Servette, Luzern – 1987–94, 1996–2002
- (United States) **Bryan Okoh** – **FC Lausanne-Sport** – 2025–
- (Spain) David Pallas – Zürich, Thun – 1998–2005
- (France) Roger Pasquini – FC Lausanne-Sport – 1934–35
- (Bosnia and Herzegovina) Vladimir Petković – Sion – 1988–89
- (Kosovo) **Mergim Qarri** – **Lausanne Ouchy** – 2023–
- (Ghana) Richmond Rak – Grasshopper, Neuchâtel Xamax – 2006–09
- (Kosovo) Milaim Rama – Thun, Schaffhausen – 2002–04, 2005–08, 2010–12
- (Canada) Alain Rochat – Yverdon Sport, Young Boys, Zürich, FC Lausanne-Sport – 1999–2005, 2006–11, 2013–18
- (Peru) Leonel Romero – Grasshopper – 2005–07, 2008–09
- (Italy) Francesco Ruberto – Thun – 2015–18
- (Bosnia and Herzegovina) Vero Salatić – Grasshopper, Sion – 2003–11, 2012–17
- (France) **Alvyn Sanches** – FC Lausanne-Sport, **Young Boys** – 2020–
- (Italy) Stéphane Sarni – Sion, Servette – 1997–99, 2000–01, 2003–04, 2006–10
- (Serbia) Nenad Savić – Grasshopper, Neuchâtel Xamax, Basel, Thun – 1998–2006
- (United States) Ilan Sauter – Zürich – 2019–20
- (South Africa) Lukas Schenkel – Thun, St. Gallen, Thun – 2004–06, 2009–11, 2013–15
- (Brazil) Stephan Seiler – Zürich, Winterthur – 2019–23
- (North Macedonia) Nezbedin Selimi – Wil 1900 – 2003–04
- (Kosovo) Rijat Shala – Lugano, Grasshopper – 2000–04
- (Kosovo) Xherdan Shaqiri – Basel – 2009–12
- (Bosnia and Herzegovina) Emir Sinanović – Aarau – 2008–10
- (Croatia) Dejan Sorgić – Luzern, Thun, Sion – 2006–07, 2008–13, 2016–25
- (Kosovo) Albert Spahiu – Young Boys – 2010–11
- (United States) Remo Staubli – Zürich, Aarau – 2006–09, 2013–14
- (Argentina) Nestor Subiat – Lugano, Grasshopper – 1992–97
- (Kosovo) Bashkim Sukaj – FC Lausanne-Sport – 2012–13
- (England) Scott Sutter – Grasshopper, Zürich, Young Boys – 2004–17
- (Serbia) Igor Tadić – St. Gallen – 2012–13
- (Italy) Pierluigi Tami – Bellinzona, Lugano – 1988–93
- (Germany) Christopher Teichmann – Aarau – 2013–14
- (Senegal) Yannick Toure – Young Boys – 2021–22
- (Zaire) Cédric Tsimba – Servette – 2001–02, 2003–04
- (Cameroon) Marc Tsoungui – FC Lausanne-Sport – 2020–22
- (Portugal) Max Veloso – Neuchâtel Xamax, Sion – 2009–10, 2011–14
- (Uruguay) Matias Vitkieviez – Servette, Young Boys, St. Gallen – 2011–15
- (Colombia) Johan Vonlanthen – Young Boys, Zürich, Grasshopper – 2001–04, 2009–10, 2013–14
- (Mexico) Mauricio Willimann – Luzern – 2022–24

== Albania ==
- **Amir Abrashi** – **Grasshopper**, Basel – 2010–15, 2020–
- Ansi Agolli – Neuchâtel Xamax, Luzern – 2005–07
- Arlind Ajeti – Basel – 2011–15
- Naser Aliji – Basel, Vaduz – 2013–16
- Albion Avdijaj – Grasshopper, Vaduz – 2013–24, 2015–18
- Nedim Bajrami – Grasshopper – 2016–19
- Migjen Basha – Luzern – 2015–16
- Vullnet Basha – Grasshopper, Neuchâtel Xamax, Sion – 2009–14
- Berat Djimsiti – Zürich – 2011–16
- Arbnor Fejzullahu – Neuchâtel Xamax – 2018–19
- Shkëlzen Gashi – Zürich, Bellinzona, Neuchâtel Xamax, Grasshopper, Basel – 2006–07, 2008–11, 2012–16
- Jürgen Gjasula – St. Gallen, Basel – 2005–09
- Jahmir Hyka – Luzern – 2011–17
- **Florian Kamberi** – Grasshopper, St. Gallen, **Winterthur** – 2015–17, 2020–
- Burim Kukeli – Luzern, Zürich, Sion – 2007–19
- Ermir Lenjani – Grasshopper, St. Gallen, Sion – 2010–11, 2012–15, 2017–20
- Bujar Lika – Grasshopper – 2017–19
- Haxhi Neziraj – Luzern – 2012–15
- Arijan Qollaku – Grasshopper – 2016–18
- Armando Sadiku – Zürich, Vaduz, Lugano – 2013–17
- **Taulant Seferi** – **Young Boys**, Neuchâtel Xamax – 2014–15, 2016–17, 2019–
- **Denis Simani** – **Vaduz** – 2020–
- **Simon Simoni** – **Luzern** – 2026–
- Daniel Xhafaj – Neuchâtel Xamax – 2005–06
- **Taulant Xhaka** – **Basel**, Grasshopper – 2010–
- Frédéric Veseli – Lugano – 2015–16
- Mirson Volina – Thun – 2007–08, 2010–13

== Algeria ==
- Ayoub Abdellaoui – Sion – 2018–21
- Hocine Achiou – Aarau – 2006–07
- Lakhdar Adjali – Sion – 1998–99
- **Marley Aké** – **Yverdon Sport** – 2023–
- **Mohamed El Amine Amoura** – **Lugano** – 2021–
- **Paul Bernardoni** – **Yverdon Sport** – 2023–
- Olivier Boumelaha – Basel, St. Gallen – 1999–2003
- Khaled Gourmi – Young Boys – 2009–10
- **Jaouen Hadjam** – **Young Boys** – 2023–
- Yacine Hima – Aarau, Bellinzona – 2006–07, 2008–10
- **Ahmed Kendouci** – **Lugano** – 2025–
- **Haithem Loucif** – **Yverdon Sport** – 2023–
- **Aymen Mahious** – **Yverdon Sport** – 2023–
- Yassin Maouche – Zürich – 2017–19
- Djamel Mesbah – Servette, Basel, Aarau, Luzern, FC Lausanne-Sport – 2003–09, 2017–18
- Rachid Mekhloufi – Servette – 1961–62
- Hemza Mihoubi – Bellinzona – 2009–11
- Nordine Sam – Luzern – 2006–07
- Liazid Sandjak – Neuchâtel Xamax – 1996–98
- Yannis Tafer – FC Lausanne-Sport, St. Gallen – 2012–19
- Hussayn Touati – Servette – 2022–24

== Andorra ==
- Ildefons Lima – Bellinzona – 2008–11

== Angola ==
- Joaquim Adão – Sion – 2009–10, 2011–13, 2015–18
- Guilherme Afonso – Sion, Grasshopper – 2008–10, 2011–12
- **Edgar André** – **Sion** – 2019–21
- Signori António – FC Lausanne-Sport, Basel – 2012–14, 2017–19
- **Giovani Bamba** – **Lausanne Ouchy** – 2023–
- Genséric Kusunga – Basel, Servette – 2010–13
- Dereck Kutesa – Basel, Luzern, St. Gallen – 2016–20
- Afimico Pululu – Basel, Neuchâtel Xamax– 2017–22

== Argentina ==
- David Abraham – Basel – 2008–12
- Oscar Román Acosta – Servette – 1989–90
- Francisco Aguirre – Yverdon Sport FC, St. Gallen – 2005–08
- **Ignacio Aliseda** – **Lugano** – 2021–
- Federico Almerares – Basel – 2008–10
- Nicolás Andereggen – Zürich – 2018–19
- Mariano Armentano – Basel – 1996–97
- Juan Barbas – Locarno, Sion – 1990–93
- César Carignano – Basel – 2004–08
- José Chatruc – Grasshopper – 2003–04
- Néstor Clausen – Sion – 1989–94
- Emiliano Ariel Dudar – Bellinzona, Young Boys – 2008–12
- Iván Furios – Neuchâtel Xamax – 2007–09
- Juan Esnáider Ruiz – FC Lausanne-Sport – 2016–17
- Adrián Fernández – St. Gallen – 2007–08
- Fernando Gamboa – Grasshopper – 2003–04
- Juan Pablo Garat – St. Gallen, Aarau – 2005–08, 2013–15
- **Juan Carlos Gauto** – **Basel** – 2023–
- Marcos Gelabert – St. Gallen, Basel, Neuchâtel Xamax – 2006–12
- Christian Eduardo Giménez – Lugano, Basel – 1998–2005
- **Mariano Gómez** – **Zürich** – 2024–
- Francisco Gabriel Guerrero – Zürich, Basel, Aarau – 2001–05, 2007–09
- Guillermo Imhoff – Sion – 2009–11
- José Luis Mamone – Luzern – 2006–07
- Leandro Marín – FC Lausanne-Sport – 2017–18
- Javier Mazzoni – FC Lausanne-Sport – 1999–2000
- Jesús Méndez – St. Gallen – 2006–07
- Leonel Mosevich – St. Gallen – 2018–19
- Matías Palacios – Basel – 2020–22
- Guillermo Pereyra – Young Boys – 2008–09
- Julio Hernán Rossi – Lugano, Basel, Neuchâtel Xamax – 1998–2006, 2007–10
- Walter Samuel – Basel – 2014–16
- Leonardo Sánchez – Zürich – 2015–16
- Gastón Sauro – Basel – 2012–14
- Ezequiel Óscar Scarione – Thun, Luzern, St. Gallen – 2006–09, 2010–11, 2012–13
- Fernando Screpis – Sion – 2002–03
- Dante Senger – Aarau – 2013–15
- Darío Siviski – Servette – 1990–91, 1992–93
- Carlos Daniel Tapia – Lugano – 1991–92
- **Milton Valenzuela** – **Lugano** – 2022–
- **Tomás Verón Lupi** – **Grasshopper** – 2024–
- Javier Villarreal – Grasshopper – 2004–05
- Nelson Vivas – Lugano – 1997–98
- Gonzalo Zárate – Grasshopper, Young Boys, FC Thun, Vaduz, FC Lausanne-Sport – 2007–10, 2012–18

== Armenia ==
- Vardan Minasyan – FC Lausanne-Sport – 1998–99
- Artur Petrosyan – Zürich – 2003–06
- Armen Shahgeldyan – FC Lausanne-Sport – 1998–2000
- Artem Simonyan – Zürich – 2015–16
- Vahe Tadevosyan – Aarau – 2006–07
- Harutyun Vardanyan – FC Lausanne-Sport, Young Boys, Servette, Aarau – 1997–98, 2001–06

== Australia ==
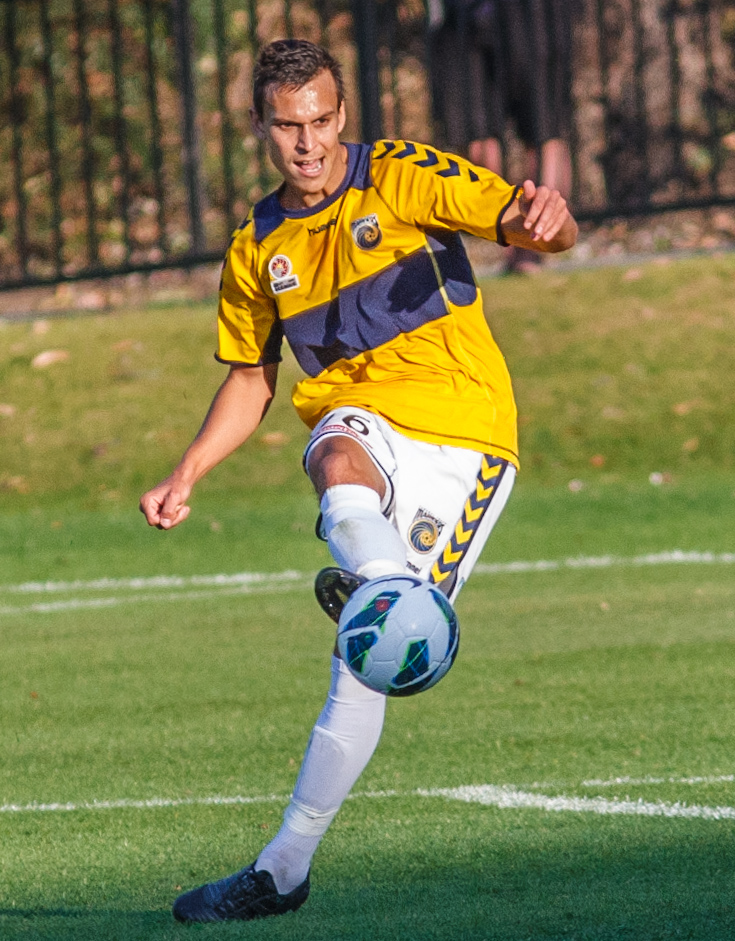
Trent Sainsbury

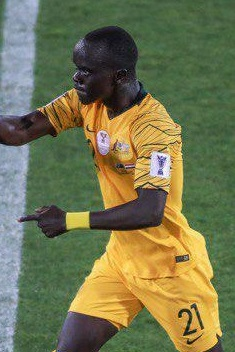
Awer Mabil

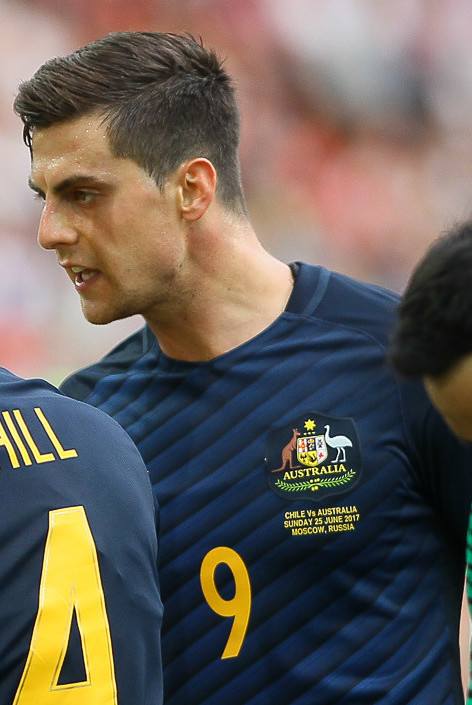
Tomi Jurić

- Paul Agostino – Young Boys – 1992–94
- Ross Aloisi – Aarau – 1996–97
- Oliver Bozanic – Luzern – 2013–15
- Scott Chipperfield – Basel – 2001–12
- Joel Griffiths – Neuchâtel Xamax – 2003–06
- **Nestory Irankunda** – **Grasshopper** – 2024–
- Tomi Juric – Luzern – 2016–19
- Joshua Laws – Grasshopper – 2023–24
- **Awer Mabil** – **Grasshopper** – 2023–
- Ljubo Milicevic – Zürich, Basel, Thun, Young Boys – 2001–07
- Trent Sainsbury – Grasshopper – 2017–18
- Kostas Salapasidis – Lugano – 2000–01
- Mile Sterjovski – Basel – 2004–07
- Aurelio Vidmar – Sion – 1995–96
- Dario Vidošić – Sion – 2013–15
- Goran Zarić – Lausanne-Sport – 1998–99
- David Zdrilic – Aarau – 1997–98

== Austria ==
- Chukwubuike Adamu – St. Gallen – 2020–21
- Moritz Bauer – Grasshopper, Servette FC – 2011–16, 2022-23
- Daniel Beichler – St. Gallen – 2010–11
- **Flavius Daniliuc** – **Basel** – 2025–
- Yusuf Demir – Basel – 2023–24
- Marco Djuricin – Grasshopper – 2017–19
- Aleksandar Dragović – Basel – 2010–14
- Daniel Dunst – St. Gallen – 2010–11
- Patrick Farkas – Luzern – 2021–22
- Sandro Gotal – St. Gallen – 2015–16
- **Adrian Grbić** – **Luzern** – 2023–
- Raphael Holzhauser – Grasshopper – 2018–19
- Elvin Ibrisimovic – Vaduz – 2020–21
- Marc Janko – Basel, Lugano – 2015–19
- Jakob Jantscher – Luzern – 2014–16
- Kurt Jara – Grasshopper – 1981–85
- Dijon Kameri – Grasshopper – 2023–24
- Sanel Kuljić – Sion, Neuchâtel Xamax – 2006–07, 2009–11
- Markus Kuster – Winterthur – 2022–25
- Manuel Kuttin – Grasshopper – 2023–25
- Marko Kvasina – Luzern – 2021–22
- Mario Leitgeb – St. Gallen – 2015–17
- **Heinz Lindner** – Grasshopper, Basel, Sion – 2017–19, 2020–23, 2024–
- Roland Linz – Grasshopper – 2008–09
- Thomas Mandl – Basel – 2004–05
- Georg Margreitter – Grasshopper – 2021–23
- Emanuel Pogatetz – Aarau – 2002–03
- **Manuel Polster** – **FC Lausanne-Sport** – 2024–25
- Thomas Prager – Luzern – 2010–11
- Boris Prokopič – Vaduz – 2020–21
- Mario Sara – Vaduz– 2014–15
- Louis Schaub – Luzern – 2020–21
- Thorsten Schick – Young Boys – 2016–19
- René Schicker – St. Gallen – 2004–05
- Fabian Schubert – St. Gallen – 2021–24
- Daniel Sikorski – St. Gallen – 2014–15
- Manuel Sutter – St. Gallen, Vaduz – 2009–11, 2012–13, 2014–16
- Peter Tschernegg – St. Gallen – 2017–19
- Philipp Zulechner – Young Boys – 2015–16

== Azerbaijan ==
- **Renat Dadashov** – **Grasshopper** – 2022–

== Bahrain ==
- Abdulla Baba Fatadi – Neuchâtel Xamax – 2009–10
- Abdullah Omar – Neuchâtel Xamax – 2009–12

== Belgium ==
- **Julien Duranville** – **Basel** – 2025–
- Noë Dussenne – FC Lausanne-Sport – 2023–26
- Jérémy Huyghebaert – Neuchâtel Xamax – 2018–19
- Ilombe Mboyo – Sion – 2017–18
- Émile Mpenza – Sion – 2009–10
- Geoffrey Mujangi Bia – Sion – 2015–17
- Julien Ngoy – Grasshoppers – 2018–19
- Joseph Nonge – Servette – 2024–25

== Benin ==
- **Tosin Aiyegun** – **Zürich** – 2019–
- Alain Gaspoz – St. Gallen, Sion, Lugano, Zürich, Aarau – 1992–93, 1995–2004, 2006–07
- **Hassane Imourane** – **Grasshopper** – 2024–
- Omar Kossoko – Servette – 2012–13
- **Mohamed Tijani** – **Yverdon Sport** – 2023–
- Adam Waidi – FC Lausanne-Sport – 2012–14

== Bolivia ==
- Sergio Bastida – Lugano, Zürich, Aarau – 1999–2005, 2007–10
- **Boris Céspedes** – **Servette** – 2019–

== Bosnia and Herzegovina ==
- Admir Aganović – Neuchâtel Xamax – 2009–11
- Amar Avdukić – Thun – 2017–18
- Mirsad Baljić – Sion, Zürich, Luzern – 1988–94
- **Adrian Leon Barišić** – **Basel** – 2023–
- Mehmed Begzadić – FC Lausanne-Sport – 2012–13
- Aleksandar Bratić – Servette – 2000–04
- Josip Colina – Basel, Grasshopper – 1998–99, 2007–11
- Miroslav Čovilo – Lugano – 2018–22
- Ermedin Demirović – St. Gallen – 2019–20
- Damir Džombić – Basel, Vaduz – 2003–04, 2005–07, 2008–09
- Omer Dzonlagic – Thun – 2015–18
- **Armin Gigović** – **Young Boys** – 2025–
- Izet Hajrović – Grasshopper – 2009–14
- Sead Hajrović – Grasshopper – 2013–14
- Amir Hamzić – Aarau – 2000–02
- Sanel Jahić – Grasshopper – 2013–15
- Rifet Kapić – Grasshopper – 2017–18
- Nikola Katić – Zürich – 2022–25
- Kenan Kodro – Grasshopper – 2017–18
- Muhamed Konjić – Zürich – 1996–97
- Davor Landeka – Grasshopper – 2011–12
- Senad Lulić – Grasshopper, Young Boys – 2008–11
- **Luka Mikulić** – **Grasshopper** – 2025–
- Danijel Milićević – Yverdon Sport – 2005–06
- Daniel Pavlović – Grasshopper, Lugano – 2010–15, 2019–20
- Sejad Salihović – St. Gallen – 2016–17
- Admir Seferagić – Basel – 2013–14
- Mustafa Sejmenović – Yverdon-Sport – 2005–06
- Asim Škaljić – Sion – 2004–07
- Admir Smajić – Neuchâtel Xamax, Basel, Young Boys – 1988–99
- Leonid Srdic – Lugano – 2021–22
- **Miroslav Stevanović** – **Servette** – 2019–
- Aldin Turkeš – Zürich, Vaduz, Lausanne-Sport, Winterthur – 2015–17, 2020–25

== Brazil ==
- Abedi – Sion, Basel – 1998–2000
- Adaílton – Sion – 2009–13
- Felipe Adão – Luzern – 2007–08
- Adriano – Neuchâtel Xamax – 1992–95
- **Adryan** – **Sion** – 2017–19, 2021–
- Aislan – Sion – 2011–13
- Fabiano Alves – St. Gallen – 2019–20
- **Lucas Alves de Araujo** – **Luzern** – 2016–
- Sonny Anderson – Servette – 1992–94
- Assis – Sion – 1992–95, 1996–97
- Marco Balthazar – Servette – 2004–05
- **Batata** – **Sion** – 2018–
- Tiago Bernardini – Thun – 2005–06
- Bruno Bertucci – Grasshopper – 2011–12
- Beto – Sion – 2007–09
- **Léo Bonatini** – **Grasshopper** – 2021–
- Arthur Cabral – Basel – 2019–22
- Caio Alves – Grasshopper – 2013–17
- Caiuby – Grasshopper – 2018–19
- Tiago Calvano – Young Boys – 2005–08
- Carlão – Neuchâtel Xamax – 2011–12
- Carlinhos – Thun – 2016–17
- Carlinhos Júnior – Lugano – 2016–20
- Carlitos – Aarau – 2006–08
- Cássio – Thun – 2012–15
- **Mychell Chagas** – **Servette** – 2019–
- Claiton – Servette – 2001–02
- Cristiano – Basel – 2006–07
- Matheus Cunha – Sion – 2017–18
- Antônio da Silva – Basel – 2009–10
- Ronny Carlos da Silva – Zürich – 2004–05
- Marcos De Azevedo – Servette – 2011–13
- Danilo de Oliveira – Sion – 2011–13
- Jão Carlos de Oliveira – Yverdon Sport – 2000–01
- Leonardo de Oliveira – Servette, St. Gallen – 2004–06
- Di Fábio – Thun – 2006–08
- Didi – Yverdon-Sport – 2000–01
- Dill – Servette – 2001–02
- Marcus Diniz – FC Lausanne-Sport – 2016–17
- **Sylvain Djoho** – **Servette** – 2026–
- Antonio Dos Santos – Thun, Schaffhausen, Grasshopper, Sion – 2003–10
- Edílson – Aarau – 2003–04
- Eduardo – Basel – 2005–09
- **Kaio Eduardo** – **Basel** – 2025–
- Enílton – Yverdon-Sport, Sion – 1999–2001
- Eudis – Zürich, Young Boys, Servette – 2006–09, 2011–13
- Everson – Young Boys, Neuchâtel Xamax – 2005–06, 2007–08
- Fabiano – Thun – 2011–12
- Fabinho – Delémont, Wil 1900, St. Gallen, Schaffhausen – 1999–2000, 2002–07
- Fernando – Schaffhausen, St. Gallen – 2004–08, 2009–11
- Leandro Fonseca – St. Gallen, Yverdon-Sport, Neuchâtel Xamax, Young Boys, Grasshopper, Thun – 1995–96, 1999–2000, 2001–04, 2005–07
- Galatto – Neuchâtel Xamax – 2011–12
- José Galvão – Servette – 2002–03
- Mauro Galvão – Lugano – 1990–96
- Gaspar – Lugano, Vaduz, Bellinzona – 2001–02, 2008–10
- Edson Gaúcho – FC Lausanne-Sport – 1988–89
- Gelson Rodrigues – Thun – 2004–06
- Gil Bala – Yverdon-Sport – 2000–01
- Franciel Hengemühle – Schaffhausen – 2004–05
- Hilton – Servette – 2002–04
- **Itaitinga** – **Sion** – 2018–
- Léo Itaperuna – Sion – 2012–17
- João Paulo – Servette, Young Boys, Neuchâtel Xamax – 2004–08
- Juárez – Yverdon-Sport, Servette – 1993–99
- **Jefferson** – **Lugano** – 2019–
- Kléber – Basel – 2004–05
- Christian Leite – Thun – 2014–15
- Igor Liziero – Yverdon-Sport FC – 2023–24
- **Patrick Luan** – **Sion** – 2019–
- Luís Mário – St. Gallen – 2007–08
- **Luis Phelipe** – **Lugano** – 2021–
- Everton Luiz – St. Gallen – 2014–16
- Luiz Carlos – Sion – 2006–07
- Gabriel Machado – Grasshopper – 2007–08
- Marcão – Yverdon-Sport – 2005–06
- Marcos – Young Boys – 2006–07
- **Marquinhos Cipriano** – **Sion** – 2021–
- Ryder Matos – Luzern – 2019–20
- **Metinho** – **Basel** – 2024–
- **Nathan Cardoso** – Grasshopper, **Zürich** – 2018–
- Júnior Negrão – FC Lausanne-Sport – 2011–12
- André Luís Neitzke – Sion, Neuchâtel Xamax – 2017–20
- Neri – St. Gallen, Young Boys, Aarau, Schaffhausen, Bellinzona – 1998–2000, 2004–07, 2008–09
- Weligton Oliveira – Grasshopper – 2006–07
- Paquito – Luzern – 2006–07, 2008–09
- Paulinho – Aarau, Grasshopper – 2003–12
- Paulo Ricardo – Sion – 2016–18
- Pedro Henrique – Zürich – 2011–14
- Pena – Grasshopper – 1998–99
- Philippe – Sion – 2018–19
- Adriano Pimenta – Thun – 2005–07
- Raffael – Luzern – 2005–08
- Ramazotti – Zürich – 2011–12
- Eric Ramires – Basel – 2019–20
- Rodrigo – Sion, FC Lausanne-Sport – 2010–13
- Rogério – Wil 1900, Grasshopper, Aarau – 2003–10
- Willian Rocha – Grasshopper – 2012–13
- Rosemir – Wil 1900, Schaffhausen – 2003–04, 2005–07
- **Raphael Rossi Branco** – **Sion** – 2018–19
- Fabinho Santos – Basel – 1998–99
- **Guilherme Schettine** – **Grasshopper** – 2022–
- Silas – Grasshopper – 2010–11
- Adriano Spadoto – Thun – 2004–05
- Túlio – Sion – 1992–93
- Valmir – Wil 1900 – 2002–03
- Leandro Vieira – Thun – 2005–06
- Vinícius – Zürich – 2015–16
- Vítor Huvos – Grasshopper – 2007–09
- **Wesley (David de Oliveira Andrade)** – **Sion** – 2020–
- Wesley (Lopes da Silva) – Grasshopper – 2006–07
- **Yuri** – **Lugano** – 2021–

== Bulgaria ==
- Petar Aleksandrov – Aarau, Neuchâtel Xamax, Luzern – 1991–93, 1994–2000
- Alexandre Barthe – Grasshopper – 2015–16
- Valeri Bojinov – FC Lausanne-Sport – 2017–18
- Georgi Donkov – Neuchâtel Xamax – 2001–02
- Ivan Ivanov – Basel – 2013–15
- Borislav Mihaylov – Zürich – 1997–98
- Georgi Milanov – Grasshopper – 2015–16
- Martin Petrov – Servette – 1998–2001
- Dimitar Rangelov – Luzern – 2012–14
- Georgi Rusev – Sion – 2024–25
- Georgi Slavchev – St. Gallen – 1997–99
- Zlatomir Zagorčić – Lugano – 1999–2002

== Burkina Faso ==
- Hassane Bandé – Thun – 2019–20
- **Salifou Diarrassouba** – St. Gallen, **Grasshopper** – 2020–22, 2025–
- Nasser Djiga – Basel – 2021–24
- Dylan Ouédraogo – Lausanne Ouchy – 2023–24
- Abdel Zagré – Sion – 2022–23

== Burundi ==
- David Opango – Zurich, Aarau – 1997–2007

== Cameroon ==
- Timothée Atouba – Neuchâtel Xamax, Basel – 2000–04
- Gustave Bahoken – Sion – 1998–99
- Albert Baning – Aarau – 2005–06
- **Nicky Beloko** – Sion, **Luzern** – 2017–18, 2022–
- Patrick Bengondo – Aarau – 2006–09
- Henri Bienvenu – Young Boys – 2009–12
- Vincent Bikana – Neuchâtel Xamax – 2011–12
- Gilles Binya – Neuchâtel Xamax – 2009–12
- Armand Deumi – Sion, Thun – 2000–07
- Patrick Ekeng – FC Lausanne-Sport – 2013–14
- Eugène Ekobo – Sion – 2000–02
- Franck Etoundi – Neuchâtel Xamax, St. Gallen, Zürich – 2009–10, 2012–16
- Guy Feutchine – St. Gallen – 2006–08
- Christ Mbondi – Sion – 2010–12
- Lucien Mettomo – Luzern – 2006–07
- Otele Mouangue – Luzern, Aarau – 2012–14
- Sylvain Moukwelle – Lugano – 2000–01
- Yannick N'Djeng – Sion – 2012–14
- Tsiy-William Ndenge – Luzern, Grasshopper – 2018–25
- Moumi Ngamaleu – Young Boys – 2017–23
- **Lilian Njoh** – **Servette** – 2025–
- Jean-Pierre Nsame – Young Boys, St. Gallen – 2017–21, 2022–25
- Samuel Ojong – Sion, Delémont, Neuchâtel Xamax, Thun – 2000–05
- Gaël Ondoua – Servette – 2019–21
- Jérôme Onguéné – Servette – 2023–24
- Samuel Gouet – Yverdon-Sport – 2023–24
- Brice Owona – St. Gallen – 2009–12
- Edgar Salli – St. Gallen – 2015–16
- Alex Song – Sion – 2018–20
- Jean-Pierre Tcheutchoua – Sion, Aarau – 2001–02, 2003–07
- Jean-Michel Tchouga – Yverdon-Sport, Basel, Luzern – 1999–2002, 2006–10
- Hervé Tum – Sion, Basel – 1998–99, 2000–04
- **Noah Yannick** – **St. Gallen** – 2024–
- Banana Yaya – FC Lausanne-Sport – 2013–14
- Christian Zock – Sion – 2017–20
- Jacques Zoua – Basel – 2009–13

== Canada ==
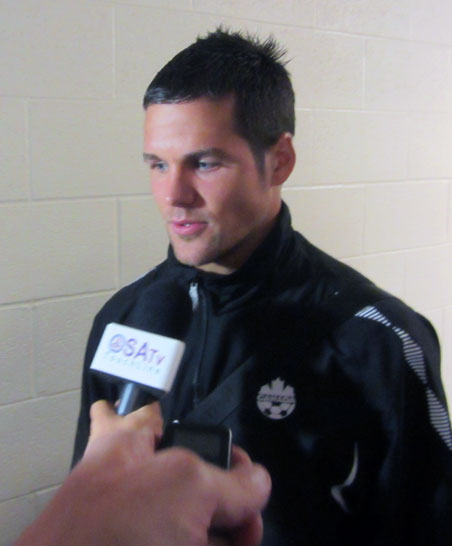
Josh Simpson

- **Theo Bair** – **FC Lausanne-Sport** – 2025–
- **Zachary Brault-Guillard** – **Lugano** – 2024–
- Sebastian Breza – Yverdon-Sport FC – 2023–24
- Ian Bridge – La Chaux-de-Fonds – 1985–90
- Mathieu Choinière – Grasshopper – 2024–25
- Theo Corbeanu – Grasshopper – 2023–24
- Daniel Imhof – St. Gallen – 1999–2005, 2009–11
- Liam Millar – Basel – 2021–24
- Lucas Pos – Lausanne Ouchy – 2023–24
- Josh Simpson – Young Boys – 2011–12

== Cape Verde ==
- Cabral – Basel, Zürich – 2007–13, 2015–17
- **Stéphane Cueni** – Lausanne-Sport, **Winterthur** – 2020–21, 2024–
- Vagner – Sion – 2021–22

== Central African Republic ==
- Frédéric Nimani – Neuchâtel Xamax – 2018–19
- Goduine Koyalipou – FC Lausanne-Sport – 2021–22
- **Usman Simbakoli** – **Servette** – 2024–

== Chile ==
- Mario Cáceres – St. Gallen – 2008–10
- Marcelo Díaz – Basel – 2012–15
- Bryan Rabello – Luzern – 2014–15
- Sebastián Rozental – Grasshopper – 2002–03
- Eduardo Rubio – Basel – 2008–09
- Héctor Tapia – Thun – 2006–07
- Adán Vergara – Zürich, Luzern – 2007–09
- Iván Zamorano – St. Gallen – 1988–90

== China ==
- **Lei Li** – **Grasshopper** – 2021–
- Ming-yang Yang – Lausanne-Sport – 2013–14, 2016–17

== Colombia ==
- Éder Álvarez Balanta – Basel – 2016–20
- Álvaro Domínguez – Sion – 2007–11
- Jhon Espinoza – Lugano – 2022–24
- **Nelson Palacio** – **Zürich** – 2025–
- **Juan José Perea** – **Zürich** – 2024–
- **Jorge Segura** – **Zürich** – 2025–
- Alexander Viveros – Grasshopper – 2005–06

== Comoros ==
- **Abdallah Ali Mohamed** – **Lausanne Ouchy** – 2023–

== Congo ==
- Silvère Ganvoula – Young Boys – 2023–25
- **Christopher Ibayi** – **Luzern** – 2025–
- Chris Malonga – FC Lausanne-Sport – 2012–13
- **Bradley Mazikou** – **Servette** – 2023–
- Kévin Monzialo – Lugano – 2020–22
- Matt Moussilou – FC Lausanne-Sport – 2011–14
- **Kévin Mouanga** – **FC Lausanne-Sport** – 2024–
- Igor N'Ganga – Young Boys, Aarau – 2006–08, 2013–15
- **Morgan Poaty** – **FC Lausanne-Sport** – 2023–

== Congo DR ==
- Chadrac Akolo – Sion, St Gallen – 2013–17, 2022-25
- Jonathan Bolingi – FC Lausanne-Sport – 2020–21
- **Faveurdi Bongeli** – **Luzern** – 2026–
- Meschak Elia – Young Boys – 2019–25
- Timothy Fayulu – Sion, Winterthur – 2018–23, 2024–25
- Enes Fermino – Sion – 2008–11
- **Oscar Kabwit** – **Luzern** – 2025–
- Aldo Kalulu – Basel – 2018–19, 2020–21
- Joël Kiassumbua – Lugano, Servette – 2017–18, 2019–21
- Mbala Mbuta Biscotte – Grasshopper – 2006–07
- Christopher Mfuyi – Servette – 2012–13
- Ridge Mobulu – Luzern – 2014–15
- Ridge Munsy – Thun, Grasshopper – 2014–18
- Shabani Nonda – Zürich – 1996–98
- Jonathan Okita – Zürich – 2022–25
- Nzuzi Toko – Grasshopper, St. Gallen – 2008–14, 2016–18

== Costa Rica ==
- Mayron George – FC Lausanne-Sport – 2021–22
- Álvaro Saborío – Sion – 2006–10
- Yeltsin Tejeda – FC Lausanne-Sport – 2016–18

== Croatia ==
- Marko Bašić – Grasshopper – 2015–19
- Petar Brlek – Lugano – 2018–19
- Frane Čirjak – Luzern – 2015–16
- Ante Ćorić – Zürich – 2021–22
- Antonini Čulina – Lugano – 2015–16, 2017–18
- Niko Datković – Lugano – 2015–16
- Tomislav Erceg – Lugano, Grasshopper – 1995–96
- Ilija Ivić – St. Gallen – 2012–13
- Jurica Jerković – Zürich, Lugano – 1978–86
- Vedran Ješe – Thun – 2006–07
- Goran Jozinović – Lugano – 2015–18
- Mihael Klepac – Yverdon-Sport – 2023–24
- Stjepan Kukuruzović – Zürich, Vaduz, St. Gallen, FC Lausanne-Sport – 2010–14, 2015–19, 2020–22, 2023–24
- Luka Lapenda – Grasshopper – 2007–08
- **Karlo Letica** – FC Lausanne-Sport, **Luzern** – 2023–
- Matej Maglica – St. Gallen – 2021–23
- Ivan Marković – Thun – 2014–15, 2016–17
- Ivan Martić – St. Gallen, Sion – 2009–11, 2012–14, 2020–22
- Stipe Matić – Zürich, Thun – 2003–04, 2010–13
- Frano Mlinar – Aarau – 2014–15
- Mladen Petrić – Grasshopper, Basel – 1999–2007
- Tomislav Puljić – Luzern – 2010–17
- Domagoj Pušić – Lugano – 2015–16
- Ivan Rakitić – Basel – 2005–07
- Kaja Rogulj – Luzern – 2014–16
- Ivan Santini – Zürich – 2022–24
- Roko Šimić – Zürich – 2022–23
- **Jozo Stanić** – **St. Gallen** – 2023–
- Petar Slišković – Aarau – 2014–15
- **Marin Soticek** – **Basel** – 2024–
- Marijan Urtić – Luzern – 2009–11
- **Antonio Verinac** – **St. Gallen** – 2025–
- Ante Vukušić – FC Lausanne-Sport – 2013–14
- **Lovro Zvonarek** – **Grasshopper** – 2025–

== Curaçao ==
- **Livano Comenencia** – **Zürich** – 2025–
- Rangelo Janga – Lugano – 2019–20

== Cyprus ==
- Demetris Christofi – Sion 2013–15
- **Joël Mall** – Aarau, Grasshopper, **Servette** – 2008–10, 2013–17, 2023–

== Czech Republic ==
- Jan Berger – Basel, Grasshopper, Bellinzona, St. Gallen – 1994–2003
- Erich Brabec – Aarau – 2006–07
- Daniel Břežný – Vaduz – 2008–09
- Lukáš Došek – Sion – 2006–08
- Martin Frýdek – Luzern – 2020–24
- Martin Guzik – Zürich – 1997–98
- Radoslav Kováč – Basel – 2011–12
- Jiří Koubský – St. Gallen – 2005–08, 2009–10
- Jan Lecjaks – Young Boys – 2011–17
- Vratislav Lokvenc – Basel – 2007–08
- Roman Macek – Lugano – 2018–21, 2022–25
- Václav Němeček – Servette – 1995–97
- **Dominik Pech** – **Young Boys** – 2025–
- Pavel Pergl – Bellinzona, Vaduz – 2010–11, 2014–16
- Tomáš Vaclík – Basel – 2014–18
- Marek Suchý – Basel – 2013–19
- Martin Zeman – Sion – 2015–16

== Denmark ==
- Lucas Andersen – Grasshopper – 2016–19
- **Jonathan Asp Jensen** – **Grasshopper** – 2025–
- John Eriksen – Servette, Luzern – 1986–91
- Yones Felfel – Vaduz – 2016–17
- Martin Hansen – Basel – 2018–19
- Daniel Høegh – Basel – 2015–17
- Emil Lyng – FC Lausanne-Sport – 2011–12
- Andreas Maxsø – Zürich – 2018–19
- Peter Møller – Zürich – 1994–95
- Miklos Molnar – Servette – 1991–92
- Jens Odgaard – Lugano – 2020–21
- Patrick Olsen – Grasshopper – 2016–17
- Michael Silberbauer – Young Boys – 2011–13
- Frederik Sørensen – Young Boys – 2019–20
- Mark Strudal – Grasshopper – 1989–91
- Rasmus Thelander – Zürich – 2017–18
- Steen Thychosen – FC Lausanne-Sport – 1985–87
- Mads Valentin – Zürich – 2019–20

== Dominican Republic ==
- Heinz Barmettler – Zürich – 2006–12
- Noam Baumann – Lugano – 2017–22

== Ecuador ==
- Felipe Caicedo – Basel – 2006–08
- Leonardo Campana – Grasshopper – 2021–22
- Jhon Espinoza – Lugano – 2022–24

== Egypt ==
- Ahmed Hamoudi – Basel – 2014–16
- Essam El-Hadary – Sion – 2007–09
- Mohamed Elneny – Basel – 2012–16
- Omar Gaber – Basel – 2016–18
- Hossam Hassan – Neuchâtel Xamax – 1991–92
- Ibrahim Hassan – Neuchâtel Xamax – 1991–92
- Kahraba – Luzern, Grasshopper – 2013–15
- Ahmed Abdel Monem – Neuchâtel Xamax – 1999–2000
- Hany Ramzy – Neuchâtel Xamax – 1990–94
- Mohamed Salah – Basel – 2012–14

== England ==
- **Ryan Andrews** – **Young Boys** – 2025–
- Mark Bright – Sion – 1996–97
- Archie Brown – FC Lausanne-Sport – 2021–22, 2023–24
- **Nathan Butler-Oyedeji** – **FC Lausanne-Sport** – 2025–
- Dominic Corness – Yverdon-Sport – 2023–24
- Trae Coyle – FC Lausanne-Sport – 2021–22, 2023–24
- **Tyler Fredricson** – **FC Lausanne-Sport** – 2026–
- **Luke Plange** – **Grasshopper** – 2025–
- **Layton Stewart** – **Thun** – 2025–

== Equatorial Guinea ==
- Anatole Ngamukol – Thun, Grasshopper – 2012–15
- Pepín – Lugano – 2016–17

== Estonia ==
- **Mattias Käit** – **Thun** – 2025–
- **Patrik Kristal** – **Thun** – 2026–
- Karol Mets – Zürich – 2021–23
- Maksim Paskotši – Grasshopper – 2023–26

== Ethiopia ==
- Demssie Kenedy – Sion – 2000–01

== Finland ==
- Mika Aaltonen – Bellinzona – 1987–88
- Toni Kallio – Young Boys – 2007–08
- Veli Lampi – Zürich, Aarau – 2006–10
- Toni Lehtinen – Aarau – 2010–10
- **Rodolfo Lippo** – **FC Lausanne-Sport** – 2025–
- Mika Lipponen – Aarau – 1989–92
- Juho Mäkelä – St. Gallen, Thun – 2006–07, 2013–14
- Sakari Mattila – Bellinzona – 2010–11
- Ari Nyman – Thun – 2007–08
- Juhani Ojala – Young Boys – 2011–13
- Marco Parnela – Thun – 2002–03
- Erkka Petäjä – Yverdon Sport – 1993–94
- Pasi Rautiainen – Locarno – 1986–87
- Berat Sadik – Thun – 2012–15
- Niklas Tarvajärvi – Neuchâtel Xamax – 2008–09
- Ville Taulo – Bellinzona – 2010–11
- Hannu Tihinen – Zürich – 2006–10

== France ==
- Leroy Abanda – Neuchâtel Xamax – 2019–20
- **Hamza Abdallah** – **FC Lausanne-Sport** – 2024–
- Charles Abi – Lausanne Ouchy – 2023–24
- Nasser Aboudou – Sion – 2018–19
- Fabrice Abriel – Servette – 2000–01
- Aaron Akalé – Basel – 2022–23
- **Téo Allix** – **Servette** – 2025–
- Jean-Kévin Augustin – Basel – 2022–24
- **Florian Ayé** – **Servette** – 2025–
- Axel Mohamed Bakayoko – St. Gallen – 2018–20
- **Moussa Baradji** – **Yverdon-Sport** – 2024–25
- Thierno Barry – Basel – 2023–25
- Olivier Baudry (born 1970) – FC Aarau – 1999–2001
- Olivier Baudry (born 1973) – FC Lausanne-Sport – 2000–01
- Romain Bayard – Lausanne Ouchy – 2023–24
- Mathieu Béda – Zürich – 2010–13
- Antoine Bernede – FC Lausanne-Sport – 2023–25
- Stéphane Besle – Neuchâtel Xamax, St. Gallen – 2005–06, 2007–15
- **Brian Beyer** – Yverdon-Sport, **Winterthur** – 2023–24, 2025–
- **Alexis Blin** – **FC Lausanne-Sport** – 2026–
- **Théo Bouchlarhem** – **Sion** – 2024–
- Jason Buaillon – Sion – 2013–14
- Sahmkou Camara – Lausanne Ouchy – 2023–24
- Sofyan Chader – Luzern – 2022–25
- **Yanis Cimignani** – **Lugano** – 2023–
- Fousseyni Cissé – Sion – 2013–15
- **Moussa Cissé** – **Basel** – 2024–
- **Timothé Cognat** – **Servette** – 2019–
- Mohamed Coulibaly – Grasshopper – 2011–13
- Enzo Crivelli – Servette – 2022–25
- Lucas Da Cunha – FC Lausanne-Sport – 2020–21
- Florian Danho – Lausanne Ouchy – 2023–24
- Issaga Diallo – Servette – 2011–13
- Moussa Diallo – Servette – 2020–23
- Djibril Diani – Grasshopper – 2018–19
- Andy Diouf – Basel – 2022–23
- **David Douline** – **Servette** – 2021–
- Franck Durix – Servette – 1997–2000
- Fabrice Ehret – Aarau – 2005–06
- **Malamine Efekele** – **St. Gallen** – 2025–
- Mounir El Haimour – Yverdon-Sport, Schaffhausen, Neuchâtel Xamax – 2005–08
- Tiago Escorza – FC Lausanne-Sport – 2017–18
- Hugo Fargues – Servette – 2011–12
- Bertrand Fayolle – Sion – 2000–01
- Enzo Fernández – FC Lausanne-Sport – 2017–18
- Jean-Marc Ferreri – Zürich – 1997–98
- Boubacar Fofana – Servette, Winterthur – 2020–21, 2022–25
- **Lamine Fomba** – **Servette** – 2025–
- Florent – St. Gallen – 2015–16
- Patrice Garande – Chênois – 1979–80
- Willem Geubbels – St. Gallen – 2022–25
- Jason Gnakpa – Yverdon-Sport – 2024–25
- Anthony Goelzer – Grasshopper – 2018–19
- Hakim Guenouche – Zürich – 2018–19
- Evann Guessand – FC Lausanne-Sport – 2020–21
- Zachary Hadji – Lausanne Ouchy – 2023–24
- Eric Hassli – Neuchâtel Xamax, Servette, St. Gallen, Zürich – 2003–06, 2007–11
- David Hellebuyck – FC Lausanne-Sport – 2000–01
- Fabrice Henry – Basel – 1997–2000
- Guillaume Hoarau – Young Boys – 2014–20
- Julien Ielsch – Neuchâtel Xamax – 2004–05
- Rayan Kadima – Lausanne Ouchy – 2023–24
- Aldo Kalulu – Basel – 2018–19, 2020–21
- **Enzo Kana-Biyik** – **FC Lausanne-Sport** – 2025–
- Maxen Kapo – FC Lausanne-Sport – 2021–22
- Christian Karembeu – Servette – 2004–05
- Billy Ketkeophomphone – Sion – 2011–12
- Jared Khasa – Sion – 2018–21
- **Koba Koindredi** – **FC Lausanne-Sport** – 2024–
- Hugo Komano – Yverdon-Sport – 2024–25
- Grejohn Kyei – Servette – 2019–22
- Yohan Lachor – Servette – 2000–01
- Bryan Lasme – Grasshopper – 2024–25
- Jean-Paul Laufenburger – Basel – 1964–74
- William Le Pogam – Neuchâtel Xamax – 2018–19
- Matthias Lepiller – Grasshopper – 2008–09
- **Léo Leroy** – **Basel** – 2024–
- Yannis Letard – St. Gallen – 2019–2021
- Alexandre Letellier – Young Boys – 2017–18
- **Thomas Lopes** – **Servette** – 2025–
- **Coleen Louis** – **Basel** – 2026–
- Peter Luccin – FC Lausanne-Sport – 2011–12
- Franck Madou – Young Boys, Grasshopper – 2006–08
- **Hicham Mahou** – FC Lausanne-Sport, **Lugano** – 2020–
- Elies Mahmoud – Lausanne Ouchy – 2023–24
- Anthony Maisonnial – Sion – 2018–19
- Mathieu Manset – Sion – 2012–13
- François Marque – Basel – 2007–10
- Alexis Martial – Servette – 2019–21
- Malaury Martin – FC Lausanne-Sport – 2012–13
- Evans Maurin – Yverdon-Sport, Grasshopper – 2023–25
- Matteo Mazzolini – Servette – 2019–20
- Benjamin Mendy – Zürich – 2024–25
- **Florent Mollet** – **Yverdon-Sport FC** – 2025–
- Olivier Monterrubio – Sion – 2008–09
- Marko Muslin – FC Lausanne-Sport – 2011–12
- Gaël N'Lundulu – FC Lausanne-Sport – 2011–12
- Edmond N'Tiamoah – Basel, Luzern – 1999–2001, 2006–07
- Ange Nanizayamo – FC Lausanne-Sport – 2020–22, 2023–24
- Théo Ndicka Matam – Grasshopper – 2023–25
- Noha Ndombasi – St. Gallen – 2022–23
- **Tristan Nunez** – **Servette** – 2026–
- Teddy Okou – Luzern, FC Lausanne-Sport – 2023–25
- Norman Peyretti – Thun – 2015–18
- Damien Plessis – FC Lausanne-Sport – 2013–14
- Denis-Will Poha – Sion – 2022–23
- Maxime Poundjé – FC Lausanne-Sport – 2021–22
- Yoric Ravet – FC Lausanne-Sport, Grasshopper, Young Boys – 2013–18
- Virgile Reset – Sion – 2006–09
- Ronny Rodelin – Servette – 2021–24
- Christopher Routis – Servette – 2011–13
- Jean Ruiz – Sion – 2019–22
- Nathanaël Saintini – Sion – 2021–23
- Mathieu Salamand – Thun – 2010–14
- Vincent Sasso – Servette – 2019–22
- Grégory Sertic – Zürich – 2018–19
- **Yoan Severin** – **Servette** – 2019–
- **Benoît Sida** – **Servette** – 2026–
- Nsana Simon – St. Gallen – 2020–21
- Anthony Sirufo – Sion – 2000–01
- Jérôme Sonnerat – Servette, FC Lausanne-Sport – 2001–02, 2003–04, 2011–14
- **Brandon Soppy** – **FC Lausanne-Sport** – 2025–
- **Noé Sow** – **Sion** – 2024–
- Fodé Sylla – Yverdon-Sport – 2024–25
- Johnny Szlykowicz – Neuchâtel Xamax – 2006–08
- Rayan Souici – Servette – 2019–20
- Kevin Tapoko – FC Lausanne-Sport – 2012–13
- Jérémy Taravel – Sion – 2016–17
- Didier Tholot – Sion, Basel, Young Boys – 1997–2002
- Damien Tixier – Neuchâtel Xamax – 2008–10
- Xavier Tomas – FC Lausanne-Sport – 2016–17
- Hussayn Touati – Servette – 2022–24
- **Lisandru Tramoni** – **Zürich** – 2025–
- Geoffrey Tréand – Neuchâtel Xamax, Sion, Servette, St. Gallen – 2010–16
- Adrien Trebel – FC Lausanne-Sport – 2021–22
- Jérémy Vachoux – Lausanne Ouchy – 2023–24
- Theo Valls – Servette – 2020–23
- **Hugo Vandermersch** – **St. Gallen** – 2024–
- **Alan Virginius** – **Young Boys** – 2024–
- **Hugo Vogel** – **Basel** – 2022–
- Karim Yoda – Sion – 2009–13
- Élie Youan – St. Gallen – 2020–22
- Sebahattin Yoksuzoglu – FC Lausanne-Sport, Yverdon-Sport – 2000–02, 2005–06
- **Tanguy Zoukrou** – **Young Boys** – 2024–

== Gabon ==
- Yrondu Musavu-King – St. Gallen – 2017–18

== Gambia ==
- Adama Bojang – Grasshopper – 2024–25
- Assan Ceesay – Lugano, Zürich – 2016–22
- **Ebrima Colley** – **Young Boys** – 2023–
- **Alieu Conateh** – **Grasshopper** – 2026–
- Abdou Rahman Dampha – Neuchâtel Xamax – 2009–12
- Pa Modou Jagne – St. Gallen, Sion, Zürich – 2009–11, 2012–20
- **Ablie Jallow** – **Servette** – 2025–
- **Saidy Janko** – **Young Boys** – 2019–20, 2023–

== Georgia ==
- Vladimir Akhalaia – Zürich – 2005–06
- Irakli Chirikashvili – Neuchâtel Xamax – 2011–12
- Valerian Gvilia – Luzern – 2017–19
- Gocha Jamarauli – Zürich, Luzern – 1998–2002
- Otar Kakabadze – Luzern – 2018–21
- Mikheil Kavelashvili – Grasshopper, Zürich, Luzern, Sion, Aarau, Basel – 1997–2004, 2005–07
- Levan Kharabadze – Zürich – 2018–20
- Levan Khomeriki – Aarau – 2000–02
- **Gabriel Sigua** – **Basel** – 2023–

== Germany ==
- Soheil Arghandewall – Zürich – 2019–20
- Holger Badstuber – Luzern – 2021–22
- Matthias Baron – Basel – 2010–11
- Felix Bastians – Young Boys – 2008–09
- Oliver Batista Meier – Grasshopper – 2023–24
- **Kevin Behrens** – **Basel** – 2025–
- Helmut Benthaus – Basel – 1965–71
- Peter Bernauer – Basel – 1987–91
- **Yannick Bettkober** – **Zürich** – 2024–
- Axel Borgmann – Vaduz – 2015–17
- **Carlo Boukhalfa** – **St. Gallen** – 2025–
- **Moritz Broschinski** – **Basel** – 2025–
- Jordan Brown – Zürich – 2014–15
- Lucas Cueto – St. Gallen – 2015–17
- Berkay Dabanlı – Yverdon-Sport FC – 2023–24
- Leon Dajaku – St. Gallen – 2022–23
- **Lukas Daschner** – **St. Gallen** – 2024–
- **Pius Dorn** – Vaduz, **Luzern** – 2020–21, 2022–
- Norbert Eder – Zürich – 1988–89
- **Konrad Faber** – **St. Gallen** – 2024–
- Clemens Fandrich – Luzern – 2015–16
- **Dominik Franke** – **Thun** – 2025–
- **Tom Gaal** – **St. Gallen** – 2025–
- Gianluca Gaudino – St. Gallen – 2015–17
- Maurizio Gaudino – Basel – 1997–98
- **Felix Gebhardt** – **Lugano** – 2026–
- Christian Gentner – Luzern – 2021–23
- Akaki Gogia – Zürich – 2021–22
- **Lukas Görtler** – **St. Gallen** – 2019–
- Tim Grossklaus – Vaduz – 2008–09
- **Colin Kleine-Bekel** – **St. Gallen** – 2025–
- **Alexander Hack** – **Zürich** – 2025–
- Helmut Hauser – Basel – 1964–72
- Thomas Hauser – Basel – 1982–88
- Marc Hornschuh – Zürich – 2021–24
- Gianluca Hossmann – Grasshopper – 2010–11, 2012–13, 2014–15
- Nico Hug – Vaduz – 2020–21
- **Daniel Ihendu** – **Zürich** – 2025–
- **Justin Janitzek** – **St. Gallen** – 2023–
- Moritz Jenz – FC Lausanne-Sport – 2020–22
- Anton Kade – Basel – 2022–26
- Steffen Karl – Sion – 1994–95
- **Sinan Karweina** – **Luzern** – 2024–
- Noah Katterbach – Basel – 2021–23
- Francis Kioyo – Aarau – 2009–10
- Sonny Kittel – Grasshopper – 2024–25
- Ludwig Kögl – Luzern – 1996–99
- Friedhelm Konietzka – Winterthur – 1967–71
- Thomas Konrad – Vaduz – 2016–18
- Oliver Kreuzer – Basel – 1997–2002
- Gabriel Kyeremateng – Lausanne Ouchy – 2023–24
- Moritz Leitner – Zürich – 2021–22
- Mohammad Mahmoud – Zürich – 2024–25
- **Lars Lukas Mai** – **Lugano** – 2022–
- Maurice Malone – Basel – 2023–24
- Max Meyer – Basel – 2022–24
- Joy-Slayd Mickels – Aarau – 2014–15
- **Lukas Mühl** – **Winterthur** – 2024–
- Dieter Müller – Grasshopper – 1985–96
- Marius Müller – Luzern – 2019–23
- Leonhard Münst – St. Gallen – 2021–22
- Günter Netzer – Grasshopper – 1976–77
- Oliver Neuville – Servette – 1992–96
- Tobias Nickenig – Vaduz – 2008–09
- **Chima Okoroji** – **St. Gallen** – 2023–
- **Adriano Onyegbule** – **Basel** – 2022–24
- **Antonios Papadopoulos** – **Lugano** – 2024–
- Patrick Pflücke – Servette – 2022–24
- Nick Proschwitz – Thun – 2010–11
- Sreto Ristić – Grasshopper – 2006–07
- Alessandro Riedle – Grasshopper – 2008–09, 2010–11
- Karl-Heinz Rummenigge – Servette – 1987–89
- Sebastian Schachten – Luzern – 2015–16
- Kofi Schulz – St. Gallen – 2016–17
- Marvin Schulz – Luzern – 2017–22
- Markus Schupp – Basel – 1996–97
- Benno Schmitz – Grasshopper – 2024–25
- Sahr Senesie – Grasshopper – 2004–05
- Meritan Shabani – Grasshopper – 2022–24
- Lasse Sobiech – Zürich – 2020–21
- Markus Steinhöfer – Basel – 2010–13
- Martin Stoll – Aarau – 2009–10
- Matthias Strohmaier – Vaduz – 2016–17
- Klaus Stürmer – Zürich, Grenchen – 1962–64, 1965–70
- Ifet Taljević – Neuchâtel Xamax, Thun – 2008–12
- Varol Tasar – Servette, Luzern, Yverdon-Sport – 2019–25
- Lars Unnerstall – Aarau – 2013–14
- Erwin Waldner – Zürich – 1960–61
- Thomas Weller – Schaffhausen, St. Gallen – 2005–08
- Stefan Wessels – Basel – 2009–10
- Christian Wieczorek – Vaduz – 2006–08
- Samed Yeşil – Luzern – 2015–16

== Ghana ==
- Jonas Adjetey – Basel – 2023–26
- Daniel Afriyie – Zürich – 2022–25
- Samuel Afum – Young Boys – 2012–16
- Kwabena Agouda – St. Gallen – 2004–06, 2007–08
- Samul Alabi – Luzern – 2020–21
- **Stephan Ambrosius** – **St. Gallen** – 2024–
- Charles Amoah – Winterthur, Wil 1900, St. Gallen – 1996–97, 1998–2001
- Joetex Asamoah Frimpong – Young Boys, Luzern, Zürich – 2006–10, 2012–13
- Majeed Ashimeru – St. Gallen – 2018–19
- Ebenezer Assifuah – Sion – 2013–17
- **Lawrence Ati-Zigi** – **St. Gallen** – 2019–
- Owusu Benson – Kriens, Delémont – 1997–99, 2002–03
- Raphael Dwamena – Zürich – 2017–18
- Mark Edusei – Bellinzona – 2009–11
- **Emmanuel Essiam** – **Basel**, Stade Lausanne Ouchy – 2022–
- Samuel Inkoom – Basel – 2009–11
- **Kasim Nuhu** – Young Boys, Basel, **Servette** – 2016–18, 2022–23, 2024–
- Musah Nuhu – St. Gallen – 2018–22
- Alex Tachie-Mensah – Neuchâtel Xamax, St. Gallen – 2000–08
- Ransford Selasi – Lugano – 2019–20
- Marvin Senaya – FC Lausanne-Sport – 2024–25
- Ishmael Yartey – Sion – 2011–12, 2013–15

== Greece ==
- Konstantinos Dimitriou – Basel – 2019–20
- Anastasios Donis – Lugano – 2015–16
- Christos Donis – Lugano – 2015–16
- Theofanis Gekas – Sion – 2015–17
- Thodoris Karapetsas – Grasshopper – 2008–09
- **Georgios Koutsias** – **Lugano** – 2024–
- Alexandros Safarikas – Sion – 2022–23

== Guadeloupe ==
- Alexandre Alphonse – Zürich – 2006–12
- **Anthony Baron** – **Servette** – 2022–
- Dimitri Cavaré – Sion – 2019–23
- Michaël Niçoise – Neuchâtel Xamax – 2007–09
- **Matthias Phaëton** – **Zürich** – 2025–

== Guinea ==
- Thierno Bah – Servette, Neuchâtel Xamax, FC Lausanne-Sport – 1999–2004, 2007–10, 2011–12
- Aliou Baldé – FC Lausanne-Sport – 2023–24
- Mohamed Ali Camara – Young Boys – 2018–25
- Moustapha Cissé – St. Gallen – 2024–25
- Cheick Conde – Zürich – 2022–25
- Kévin Constant – Sion – 2016–18
- **Bafodé Dansoko** – **Winterthur** – 2025–
- Samba Lélé Diba – Servette – 2022–24
- Pascal Feindouno – Sion, FC Lausanne-Sport – 2011–12, 2013–14
- Daouda Guindo – St. Gallen – 2022–23
- Alhassane Keita – Zürich, St. Gallen – 2001–07, 2013–14
- Kamil Zayatte – Young Boys – 2006–09

== Guinea-Bissau ==
- Eliseu Cassamá – Grasshopper – 2022–23
- **Houboulang Mendes** – **Servette** – 2025–
- Papu Mendes – Servette – 2021–22
- Mauro Rodrigues – Sion, Yverdon – 2020–21, 2023–25

== Haiti ==
- Frantz Bertin – Luzern – 2008–09
- **Hannes Delcroix** – **Lugano** – 2025–
- Yassin Fortuné – Sion – 2018–20, 2022–23
- Kim Jaggy – Grasshopper, Aarau – 1999–2007, 2013–15
- **Belmar Joseph** – **Sion** – 2024–

== Honduras ==
- Dereck Moncada - FC Lugano - 2026-

== Hungary ==
- Bendegúz Bolla – Grasshopper, Servette – 2021–24
- **Kevin Csoboth** – **St. Gallen** – 2024–
- Filip Holender – Lugano – 2019–20
- Ákos Kecskés – Lugano – 2018–21
- Gábor Nagy – Aarau – 2007–08
- Krisztián Vadócz – Grasshopper – 2014–15
- Vilmos Vanczák – Sion – 2007–16
- Kevin Varga – Young Boys – 2021–22
- Bálint Vécsei – Lugano – 2016–20
- Ádám Szalai – Basel – 2021–23
- Gábor Szalai – FC Lausanne-Sport – 2023–25

== Iceland ==
- Birkir Bjarnason – Basel – 2015–17
- Gunnleifur Gunnleifsson – Vaduz – 2008–09
- Victor Pálsson – Zürich – 2017–19
- Rúnar Már Sigurjónsson – Grasshopper, St. Gallen – 2016–19
- Guðmundur Steinarsson – Vaduz – 2008–09
- Grétar Steinsson – Young Boys – 2004–06

== Indonesia ==
- Kurniawan Dwi Yulianto - Luzern - 1994–95

== Iran ==
- Daniel Davari – Grasshopper – 2014–15
- Farzad Ghadamian – Aarau – 1991
- **Mostafa Heydari** – **St. Gallen** – 2026–
- Shaho Maroufi – Lausanne Ouchy – 2023–24

== Iraq ==
- Sherko Karim – Grasshopper – 2015–17

== Israel ==
- Mu'nas Dabbur – Grasshopper – 2013–17
- Ohad Kadousi – FC Lausanne-Sport – 2013–14
- Nisso Kapiloto – St. Gallen – 2014–15
- **Doron Leidner** – **Zürich** – 2024–
- Moshe Ohayon – Luzern – 2011–12
- Avi Rikan – Zürich 2013–15
- Ofir Mizrahi – Lugano – 2016–17
- Avi Tikva – Grasshopper, Young Boys – 1997–2000, 2001–03
- Lotem Zino – Thun – 2015–16

== Italy ==
- Marco Ambrosio – Grasshopper – 2004–05
- Giuseppe Aquaro – Aarau – 2008–10
- Robert Acquafresca – Sion – 2017–19
- Mario Balotelli – Sion – 2022–23
- Federico Barba – Sion – 2024–25
- Luigi Beghetto – Bellinzona – 2008–09
- Davide Belotti – Bellinzona – 2008–09
- **Riccardo Braschi** – **Thun** – 2026–
- Lorenzo Bucchi – Bellinzona, Grasshopper, Luzern – 2008–10, 2013–16
- Riccardo Calafiori – Basel – 2022–23
- Paolo Carbone – Bellinzona – 2009–10
- Alessandro Casciato – Lugano – 2021–23
- **Claudio Cassano** – **Lugano** – 2025–
- Tommaso Centinaro – Lugano – 2020–21
- Maurizio Ciaramitaro – Bellinzona – 2009–10
- Matteo Cinquini – Lugano – 2021–22
- Luca Clemenza – Sion – 2020–21
- Andrea Conti – Bellinzona – 2008–11
- Piero Constantino – Yverdon-Sport – 2000–01
- **Pantaleo Creti** – **Grasshopper** – 2025–
- Franco Cucinotta – FC Lausanne-Sport, Sion, Zürich, Chiasso, Servette – 1960–75
- Nicola Dalmonte – Lugano – 2019–20
- Dario Del Fabro – **Yverdon-Sport** – 2023–24
- Giorgio Del Signore – Zürich – 1998–2001
- Roberto Di Matteo – Aarau – 1992–93
- Aimo Diana – Bellinzona – 2009–11
- Federico Dimarco – Sion – 2017–18
- Sebastiano Esposito – Basel – 2021–22
- Luca Ferro – Neuchâtel Xamax – 2008–11
- **Cosimo Fiorini** – **Zürich** – 2024–
- Paolo Frascatore – FC Lausanne-Sport – 2016–17
- Gennaro Gattuso – Sion – 2012–13
- Guerino Gottardi – Neuchâtel Xamax – 1992–93
- Wilfried Gnonto – Zürich – 2020–23
- Demetrio Greco – Aarau – 2006–07
- Matteo Gritti – Young Boys, Bellinzona – 2006–07, 2008–11
- Andrea Guatelli – Zürich – 2007–12
- Iacopo La Rocca – Bellinzona, Grasshopper – 2008–12
- Cristian Daniel Ledesma – Lugano – 2017–18
- Feliciano Magro – Grasshopper, Basel, Zürich – 1997–2002, 2003–04, 2008–09
- Andrea Maccoppi – FC Lausanne-Sport, Servette – 2016–18, 2019–20
- Carlo Manicone – Lugano – 2017–18
- **Matteo Mantini** – **Grasshopper** – 2025–
- Francesco Margiotta – FC Lausanne-Sport, Luzern – 2016–18, 2019–20
- Rosario Martinelli – Zürich, Chiasso – 1961–77
- Edoardo Masciangelo – Lugano – 2018–19
- Maurizio Melina – Luzern – 1992–96
- Giuseppe Miccolis – Bellinzona – 2008–09
- Ludovico Moresi – Lugano – 1999–2002
- Stefano Nava – Servette – 1996–97
- **Enoch Owusu** – **St. Gallen** – 2025–
- Simone Pafundi – FC Lausanne-Sport – 2023–25
- **Dorian Paloschi** – **Grasshopper** – 2025–
- Raoul Petretta – Basel – 2016–22
- Cristiano Piccini – Yverdon-Sport FC – 2024–25
- Mario Piccinocchi – Lugano – 2015–19
- Luca Radice – Aarau – 2013–15
- Jacopo Ravasi – Luzern – 2008–09
- Stefano Razzetti – Lugano, St. Gallen – 1999–2002, 2003–08
- Vincenzo Rennella – Grasshopper – 2009–11
- Daniele Romano – Aarau – 2013–14
- Lorenzo Rosseti – Lugano – 2016–17
- Fausto Rossini – Bellinzona – 2009–10
- Francesco Russo – Lugano – 2015–17
- Andrea Russotto – Bellinzona – 2009–10
- Luca Saudati – Lugano – 1996–97
- **Yassin Sbai** – **Lugano** – 2024–
- Enrico Schirinzi – Luzern, Thun – 2008–09, 2010–17
- Marco Tardelli – St. Gallen – 1987–88
- Orlando Urbano – Lugano – 2015–17
- **Mattia Zanotti** – St. Gallen, **Lugano** – 2023–
- Carlo Zotti – Bellinzona – 2008–11

== Ivory Coast ==
- Kanga Akalé – Sion, Zürich – 1998–2003
- **Edmond Akichi** – **Lausanne Ouchy** – 2023–
- Roger Assalé – Young Boys – 2016–20
- **Chris Bedia** – **Servette** – 2022–
- Arthur Boka – Sion – 2016–17
- **Willie Britto** – **Zürich** – 2019–
- Eugène Dadi – Vaduz – 2008–09
- **Souleymane Diaby** – **Winterthur** – 2022–
- Mohammed Diallo – Sion – 2006–07
- **Serey Dié** – Basel, Neuchâtel Xamax, **Sion** – 2012–15, 2016–
- Kouadio Pascal Doubaï – Young Boys – 2010–13
- Thierry Doubaï – Young Boys, Luzern – 2007–08, 2009–11, 2014–16
- **Ousmane Doumbia** – **Zürich** – 2020–
- Seydou Doumbia – Basel – 2016–17
- Souleyman Doumbia – Grasshopper – 2017–18
- **Sékou Fofana** – **FC Lausanne-Sport** – 2024–
- **Jean-Philippe Gbamin** – **Zürich** – 2024–
- Abraham Gneki Guié – FC Lausanne-Sport – 2012–13
- Gerard Gohou – Neuchâtel Xamax – 2009–11
- Steve Gohouri – Yverdon-Sport, Young Boys – 2000–01, 2005–07
- **Fernand Gouré** – **Zürich** – 2024–
- Wilfried Kanga – Young Boys – 2021–23
- Kader Keïta – Sion – 2021–22
- Yao Eloge Koffi – Lugano – 2017–20
- Axel Cédric Konan – Bellinzona – 2010–11
- Hamed Koné – Neuchâtel Xamax – 2018–19
- **Koro Koné** – **Servette** – 2019–
- **Lamine Koné** – **FC Lausanne-Sport** – 2021–
- **Samba Koné** – **Yverdon-Sport** – 2024–
- Xavier Kouassi – Servette, Sion, Neuchâtel Xamax– 2011–16, 2017–20
- Emmanuel Latte Lath – St. Gallen – 2022–23
- Hassan Lingani – Young Boys – 2009–13
- Yacoub Meite – Sion – 2010–11
- **Jean N'Guessan** – **FC Lausanne-Sport** – 2021–
- **Levy Nene** – **FC Lausanne-Sport** – 2026–
- Ahmed Ouattara – Sion, Basel – 1994–99
- **Brahima Ouattara** – **FC Lausanne-Sport** – 2020–
- Sékou Sanogo – Thun, Grasshopper, Young Boys – 2010–19
- **Giovanni Sio** – **Sion**, Basel – 2010–12, 2013–15, 2021–
- **Trazié Thomas** – **FC Lausanne-Sport** – 2020–
- **Eric Tia** – **Luzern** – 2019–
- Adama Traoré – Basel – 2014–17
- **Bénie Traoré** – **Basel** – 2024–
- **Seydou Traoré** – **FC Lausanne-Sport** – 2023–
- Youssouf Traoré – Young Boys – 2008–10
- Gilles Yapi Yapo – Young Boys, Basel, Zürich – 2005–13, 2014–16
- **Armel Zohouri** – **FC Lausanne-Sport** – 2020–

== Jamaica ==
- Dexter Lembikisa – Yverdon-Sport FC – 2024–25

== Japan ==
- **Teisi Abe** – **Luzern** – 2023–
- Teruki Hara – Grasshopper – 2022–23
- Nikki Havenaar – Thun – 2019–20
- Naoki Imaya – Neuchâtel Xamax – 2003–04
- Yoichiro Kakitani – Basel – 2014–16
- Hayao Kawabe – Grasshopper – 2021–23
- Yuya Kubo – Young Boys – 2013–17
- Yoshika Matsubara – Delémont – 1999–2000
- Kōji Nakata – Basel – 2005–08
- Takuma Nishimura – Servette – 2023–24
- Ayumu Seko – Grasshopper – 2021–25
- Toichi Suzuki – FC Lausanne-Sport – 2020–22, 2023–24
- **Keigo Tsunemoto** – Servette, **Basel** – 2023–
- Yamato Wakatsuki – Sion – 2019–21

== Kazakhstan ==
- Alexander Merkel – Grasshopper – 2014–15

== Kenya ==
- **Damien Odera** – **Zürich** – 2025–

== Kosovo ==
- Eris Abedini – Lugano, Winterthur – 2017–19, 2022–23
- Kemal Ademi – Neuchâtel Xamax, Basel – 2018–20
- **Alban Ajdini** – Servette, Stade Lausanne Ouchy, **Lausanne-Sport** – 2019–21, 2023–
- Ifraim Alija – Wil 1900 – 2003–04
- Fidan Aliti – Luzern, Zürich – 2013–15, 2020–23
- Donis Avdijaj – Zürich – 2022–24
- Leon Avdullahu – Basel – 2023–25
- **Ismajl Beka** – **Luzern** – 2022–
- **Valon Berisha** – **Zürich** – 2025–
- **Léo Besson** – **Servette** – 2026–
- Mërgim Brahimi – Grasshopper, Aarau – 2011–14, 2015–18
- Albert Bunjaku – Schaffhausen, St. Gallen – 2004–06, 2014–17
- Imran Bunjaku – Grasshopper – 2013–14
- Dugagjin Dedaj – Zürich – 2010–11
- Shkelqim Demhasaj – Luzern – 2017–20
- David Domgjoni – Luzern – 2021–22
- Toni Domgjoni – Zürich – 2017–21
- Lorik Emini – Luzern – 2019–23
- **Betim Fazliji** – **St. Gallen** – 2019–22, 2023–
- Dren Feka – Luzern – 2017–19
- Florent Hadergjonaj – Young Boys – 2013–17
- **Kreshnik Hajrizi** – Lugano, **Sion** – 2021–
- Lavdrim Hajrulahu – Lausanne Ouchy – 2023–24
- **Kevin Halabaku** – **Sion** – 2022–
- **Valon Hamdiu** – **Lausanne Ouchy** – 2023–
- **Florian Hoxha** – **Zürich** – 2021–
- **Florian Hysenaj** – **FC Lausanne-Sport** – 2020–
- **Arian Kabashi** – **Sion** – 2019–
- Arbenit Xhemajli – Neuchâtel Xamax – 2018–20
- **Benjamin Kololli** – Sion, Young Boys, FC Lausanne-Sport, **Zürich** – 2012–14, 2015–
- Jetmir Krasniqi – Lugano – 2017–18
- **Hekuran Kryeziu** – Luzern, Vaduz, **Zürich** – 2010–
- **Leotrim Kryeziu** – **Lugano** – 2018–
- **Mirlind Kryeziu** – **Zürich** – 2017–
- **Leandro Maksutaj** – **Winterthur** – 2025–
- Denis Markaj – Lugano – 2015–16
- **Mark Marleku** – **Luzern** – 2019–
- **Behar Neziri** – **St. Gallen** – 2025–
- **Rilind Nivokazi** – **Sion** – 2025–
- **Gezim Pepsi** – Winterthur – 2022–23
- Alban Pnishi – Grasshopper – 2015–18
- **Jozef Pukaj** – **Winterthur** – 2022–
- Dilan Qela – Neuchâtel Xamax – 2018–19
- Fuad Rahimi – Vaduz – 2020–21
- Samir Ramizi – Servette – 2012–13
- Lavdrim Rexhepi – Zürich – 2017–18, 2019–20
- **Donat Rrudhani** – Young Boys, Lausanne-Sport, Luzern, **Sion** – 2022–
- Enit Sadiku – Zürich – 2019–20
- **Ledjan Sahitaj** – **Winterthur** – 2024–
- **Amir Saipi** – **Lugano** – 2021–
- Zenun Selimi – Luzern, Delémont – 2000–03
- Gjelbrim Taipi – St. Gallen, Grasshoppers – 2017–19
- **Shkelqim Vladi** – **Lugano** – 2023–
- Idriz Voca – Luzern – 2016–21
- Skender Zeqiri – Aarau – 2008–10
- Edon Zhegrova – Basel – 2018–22

== Latvia ==
- Nauris Bulvītis – Aarau – 2013–14
- **Andrejs Cigaņiks** – **Luzern** – 2024–
- Edgars Gauračs – Aarau – 2014–15
- Mārcis Ošs – Neuchâtel Xamax – 2018–20
- Igors Stepanovs – Grasshopper – 2004–06
- **Kristers Tobers** – **Grasshopper** – 2023–
- Andris Vaņins – Sion, Zürich – 2009–16, 2017–20
- Roberts Uldriķis – Sion – 2018–22

== Liberia ==
- Josephus Yenay – Yverdon-Sport, Sion, Luzern – 1993–98

== Liechtenstein ==
- Benjamin Büchel – Vaduz – 2020–21
- Franz Burgmeier – Aarau, Basel, Thun, Vaduz – 2005–08
- Mario Frick – St. Gallen, Basel, Zürich, Grasshopper – 1994–2000, 2009–11
- Maximilian Göppel – Vaduz – 2016–17
- Nicolas Hasler – Vaduz, Thun – 2014–17, 2019–20
- Rainer Hasler – Grasshopper, Vaduz, Neuchâtel Xamax, Servette – 1976–89
- Peter Jehle – Grasshopper, Luzern, Vaduz – 2000–06, 2012–13, 2014–17
- Daniel Kaufmann – Vaduz – 2014–16
- Yves Oehri – St. Gallen – 2009–10
- Justin Ospelt – Vaduz – 2020–21
- Michele Polverino – Vaduz, Aarau – 2008–10, 2014–15
- Dennis Salanović – Thun – 2018–20
- Sandro Wieser – Basel, Aarau, Thun – 2010–12, 2014–16

== Lithuania ==
- Edvinas Gertmonas - Servette FC - 2026-

== Luxembourg ==
- Stéphane Gillet – Wil 1900 – 2003–04
- Christopher Martins – Young Boys – 2019–22
- **Marvin Martins** – **Winterthur** – 2025–
- Mario Mutsch – Aarau, Sion, St. Gallen – 2007–09, 2011–17
- Mathias Olesen – Yverdon-Sport – 2023–24
- Jeff Saibene – Aarau – 1990–91
- Jeff Strasser – Grasshopper – 2009–10

== Madagascar ==
- Andy Pelmard – Basel – 2021–23
- **Rayan Raveloson** – **Young Boys** – 2024–

== Mali ==
- Amadou Dante – Zürich – 2023–24
- Fousseni Diabaté – FC Lausanne-Sport – 2023–25
- Abdoulaye Diaby – St. Gallen – 2023–25
- **Gaoussou Diakité** – **FC Lausanne-Sport** – 2025–
- Ousmane Diakité – St. Gallen – 2021–22
- Mamady Diambou – Luzern – 2022–23
- Drissa Diarra – Bellinzona – 2008–11
- Daouda Guindo – St. Gallen – 2022–23
- Aly Mallé – Grasshopper – 2018–19
- Alhassane Touré – Schaffhausen – 2003–04

== Malta ==
- **Ilyas Chouaref** – **Sion** – 2022–23, 2024–

== Martinique ==
- Brighton Labeau – FC Lausanne-Sport – 2023–24
- **Alexandre Parsemain** – **Lugano** – 2025–

== Mauritania ==
- Jordan Lefort – Young Boys – 2019–23
- **Beyatt Lekoueiry** – **FC Lausanne-Sport** – 2024–
- Birama Ndoye – Sion – 2012–22
- Sally Sarr – Luzern – 2011–17

== Mexico ==
- Aarón Galindo – Grasshopper – 2006–07

== Moldova ==
- **Lado Akhalaia** – **Vaduz** – 2026–
- Serghei Alexeev – Aarau – 2009–10
- Vitalie Damașcan – Lausanne Ouchy – 2023–24
- Artur Ioniță – Aarau – 2009–10, 2013–14
- Nicolae Milinceanu – Vaduz – 2020–21

== Montenegro ==
- Miloš Bakrač – Sion – 2013–14
- Duško Đurišić – Sion – 2001–02
- Asmir Kajević – Zürich – 2011–15
- Ivan Kecojević – Zürich – 2013–18
- Samel Šabanović – Grasshopper – 2008–10
- Đorđe Šušnjar – Lugano – 2015–16
- Anes Zverotić – Wil 1900 – 2013–14
- Elsad Zverotić – Luzern, Young Boys, Sion – 2008–18

== Morocco ==
- Sofiane Alakouch – FC Lausanne-Sport – 2021–22
- Jamal Alioui – Sion – 2006–10
- Chahir Belghazouani – Neuchâtel Xamax – 2008–09
- Younes Bnou Marzouk – Lugano – 2017–18
- Samir Boughanem – Neuchâtel Xamax – 1997–2000
- **Mouhcine Bouriga** – **Sion** – 2024–
- Fouad Chafik – FC Lausanne-Sport – 2021–22
- Abdelouahed Chakhsi – FC Lausanne-Sport – 2011–14
- Tariq Chihab – Zürich, Grasshopper, Sion, Neuchâtel Xamax – 2000–10
- Mounir Chouiar – Zürich – 2024–25
- Faysal El Idrissi – Luzern – 2005–06
- Ayman El Wafi – Lugano – 2023–26
- Hicham Kanis – Sion – 2017–18
- Salahiddine Khlifi – Neuchâtel Xamax – 2002–03
- **Andrew Lachhab** – **FC Lausanne-Sport** – 2025–
- Mimoun Mahi – Zürich – 2019–20
- Ali Messaoud – Vaduz – 2015–17
- Ayoub Rachane – Luzern – 2007–08
- **Ibrahim Salah** – **Basel** – 2025–

== Mozambique ==
- Paíto – Sion, Neuchâtel Xamax – 2007–12

== Netherlands ==
- **Dirk Abels** – **Grasshopper** – 2023–
- Tim Bakens – St. Gallen – 2010–12
- Wouter Burger – Basel – 2021–24
- Sandro Calabro – St. Gallen – 2010–12
- Wilco Hellinga – St. Gallen, Zürich – 1995–2003
- Daniël de Ridder – Grasshopper – 2011–12
- Michael Dingsdag – Sion, Grasshopper – 2010–15
- Sander Keller – Neuchâtel Xamax – 2010–11
- Kristian Kuzmanović – Vaduz – 2014–15
- **Nigel Lonwijk** – **Grasshopper** – 2023–
- **Jahnoah Markelo** – **Zürich** – 2024–
- Erik Regtop – St. Gallen – 1996–98
- **Damienus Reverson** – **Zürich** – 2024–
- Alex Schalk – Servette – 2019–22
- René van der Gijp – Neuchâtel Xamax, Aarau – 1987–89
- **Richard van der Venne** – **St. Gallen** – 2023–
- **Finn van Breemen** – **Basel** – 2023–
- René van Eck – Luzern – 1990–98
- Michel van Oostrum – Old Boys – 1989–90
- Ricky van Wolfswinkel – Basel – 2017–21
- Eric Viscaal – Grasshopper – 1995–96

== New Zealand ==
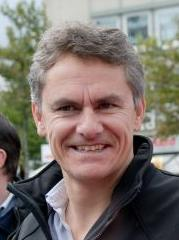
Wynton Rufer

- Marco Rojas – Thun – 2014–16
- Wynton Rufer – Zürich, Aarau, Grasshopper – 1982–89

== Nigeria ==
- Saidu Adeshina – Sion – 2007–11
- Benedict Akwuegbu – St. Gallen – 2004–05
- Stanley Amuzie – Lugano – 2017–19
- Victory Beniangba – Servette – 2024–25
- Efan Ekoku – Grasshopper – 1999–2001
- Henry Ekubo – St. Gallen – 1999–2000, 2003–04
- Blessing Eleke – Luzern – 2018–20
- **Umeh Emmanuel** – **Zürich** – 2024–
- Alfred Emuejeraye – Grasshopper – 2003–04
- Brown Ideye – Neuchâtel Xamax – 2007–09
- Ikechukwu Kalu – Bellinzona – 2008–10
- Samuel Kalu – FC Lausanne-Sport – 2023–24
- Olarenwaju Kayode – Luzern – 2011–12
- Adekunle Lukmon – Luzern – 2008–13
- **Ifeanyi Mathew** – **Zürich** – 2022–
- Yusuf Mohamed – Sion – 2009–10
- **Francis Momoh** – **Zürich** – 2021–
- **Chinwendu Johan Nkama** – **Lugano** – 2022–
- Obinna Nwaneri – Sion – 2007–10
- Stephen Odey – Zürich – 2017–19
- **Lucky Opara** – **Lugano** – 2020–
- Wilson Oruma – Servette – 2000–02
- **Sebastian Osigwe** – **Lugano** – 2020–
- **Philip Otele** – **Basel** – 2024–
- **Franklin Sasere** – **Lugano** – 2019–
- Ike Shorunmu – Basel, Zürich, Luzern – 1995–99, 2001–02
- Taye Taiwo – FC Lausanne-Sport – 2016–17
- Kalu Uche – Neuchâtel Xamax – 2011–12
- Adewale Wahab – Bellinzona – 2008–11
- Rashidi Yekini – Zürich – 1997–98

== North Korea ==
- Jong Il-gwan – Luzern – 2017–18
- Pak Kwang-ryong – Basel, Vaduz, FC Lausanne-Sport – 2011–12, 2013–15, 2016–17

== North Macedonia ==
- Ezgjan Alioski – Lugano – 2015–17
- **Dorian Babunski** – **Grasshopper** – 2023–
- Muhamed Demiri – Thun, St. Gallen – 2010–15
- Gilson – Yverdon-Sport – 2000–01
- Nikola Gjorgjev – Grasshopper – 2014–17
- Boško Gjurovski – Servette – 1989–95
- Adis Jahović – Zürich – 2012–13
- **Ilija Maslarov** – **Lugano** – 2025–
- Mirsad Mijadinoski – Zürich, Sion – 1999–2000, 2006–08
- Nebi Mustafi – Neuchâtel Xamax – 2005–06
- Ilija Najdoski – Sion – 1996–97
- **Elmin Rastoder** – Grasshopper, **Thun** – 2021–22, 2023–24, 2025–
- Aco Stojkov – Aarau – 2009–10
- Dejan Stojanović – St. Gallen – 2016–20
- Skumbim Sulejmani – Luzern – 2006–07

== Northern Ireland ==
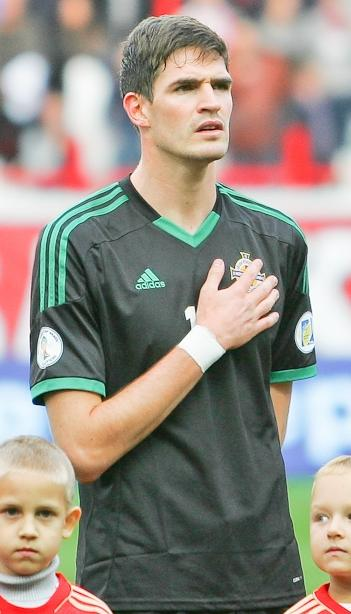
Kyle Lafferty

- Kyle Lafferty – Sion – 2012–13

== Norway ==
- Mohamed Elyounoussi – Basel – 2016–18
- Per-Egil Flo – FC Lausanne-Sport – 2020–21
- **Magnus Grødem** – **Yverdon-Sport FC** – 2024–
- **Niklas Gunnarsson** – **Yverdon-Sport FC** – 2023–
- **Vegard Kongsro** – **Yverdon-Sport FC** – 2024–
- Joel Mvuka – Young Boys – 2023–24
- Ole Selnæs – FC Zurich – 2022–23
- Rafik Zekhnini – FC Lausanne-Sport – 2020–21

== Palestine ==
- **Saleh Chihadeh** – **Thun** – 2019–

== Panama ==
- Gabriel Torres – FC Lausanne-Sport – 2016–18

== Paraguay ==
- Omar Alderete – Basel – 2019–21
- Raúl Bobadilla – Grasshopper, Young Boys, Basel – 2007–09, 2011–14
- Mauro Caballero – Vaduz – 2015–16
- Derlis González – Basel – 2014–15
- Iván Emmanuel González – St. Gallen – 2004–05
- Darío Lezcano – Thun, Luzern – 2010–16
- **Cristian Núñez** – **Yverdon-Sport FC** – 2024–
- Blás Riveros – Basel – 2016–21

== Peru ==
- Rinaldo Cruzado – Grasshopper – 2007–08
- Roberto Merino – Servette – 2004–05
- Jean-Pierre Rhyner – Grasshopper – 2016–19
- Manuel Rivera Garrido – Bellinzona – 2008–11
- Alexander Succar – Sion – 2017–18
- **Alonzo Vincent** – **Servette** – 2024–
- Carlos Zambrano – Basel – 2018–19

== Philippines ==
- Martin Steuble – Neuchâtel Xamax, Grasshopper – 2008–10

== Poland ==
- Marek Citko – Aarau, Yverdon-Sport – 2003–04, 2005–06
- Bogusław Cygan – FC Lausanne-Sport – 1993–94
- Jacek Dembiński – FC Lausanne-Sport – 1995–96
- Daniel Dziwniel – St. Gallen – 2014–15
- Radosław Gilewicz – St. Gallen – 1993–95
- Jerzy Gorgoń – St. Gallen – 1980–83
- Kamil Grosicki – Sion – 2007–08
- Ryszard Komornicki – Aarau – 1989–94
- Cezary Kucharski – Aarau – 1993–95
- Marcin Kuźba – FC Lausanne-Sport – 1999–2002
- Marek Leśniak – Neuchâtel Xamax – 1996–97
- **Łukasz Łakomy** – **Young Boys** – 2023–
- Mateusz Łęgowski – FC Lausanne-Sport – 2024–25
- Grzegorz Mielcarski – Servette – 1992–93
- Piotr Nowak – Young Boys – 1992–94
- Kacper Przybyłko – Lugano – 2023–25
- Jan Przybyło – Kriens – 1993–94
- Tomasz Rząsa – Grasshopper, Lugano, Young Boys – 1995–97
- Damian Seweryn – Young Boys – 2001–02
- Joachim Siwek – Chiasso, Vevey-Sports, Young Boys – 1980–87
- Dariusz Skrzypczak – Aarau – 1994–2003
- Dariusz Szubert – Zürich – 1996–97
- Ryszard Tarasiewicz – Neuchâtel Xamax – 1989–90
- Mirosław Trzeciak – Young Boys – 1994–95
- Robert Wallon – Neuchâtel Xamax – 1994–95
- Sławomir Wojciechowski – Aarau – 1998–2000, 2001–02
- Zbigniew Zakrzewski – Sion, Thun – 2007–08

== Portugal ==
- **Asumah Abubakar** – Lugano, Luzern, **Grasshoppers** – 2020–
- **Romário Baró** – **Basel** – 2024–
- Barroca – Servette, FC Lausanne-Sport – 2011–14
- Nelson Borges – FC Lausanne-Sport – 2011–12
- Pedro Brazão – FC Lausanne-Sport – 2020–21
- Euclides Cabral – Grasshopper – 2018–19
- Luís Calapes – Basel, Neuchâtel Xamax, Luzern, Thun – 1996–2001, 2006–08
- Gonçalo Cardoso – Basel – 2020–21
- Carlitos – Basel, Sion – 2007–10, 2014–17
- Carlos Manuel – Sion – 1987–88
- **Rodrigo Conceição** – **Zürich** – 2023–
- **Abdu Conté** – **Young Boys** – 2024–
- Ricardo Costa – Luzern – 2016–17
- Ambrosio Da Costa – Sion – 2016–17
- Nuno da Silva – Thun – 2017–19
- Joelson Fernandes – Basel – 2021–22
- **Lucas Ferreira** – **Luzern** – 2025–
- Nelson Ferreira – Thun, Luzern – 2002–19
- José Gonçalves – Thun, St. Gallen, Sion – 2005–06, 2010–13
- João Paiva – Luzern, Grasshopper – 2007–13
- João Pinto – Sion – 2006–07
- Bruno Jordão – Grasshopper – 2021–22
- Fausto Lourenço – Neuchâtel Xamax – 2010–11
- André Marques – Sion – 2012–14
- Andre Filipe Martins Roque – Neuchâtel Xamax – 2000–02
- **Christian Marques** – **Yverdon-Sport FC** – 2023–
- Martim Marques – Lugano – 2023–25
- Sava Miladinovic Bento – Luzern – 2010–11, 2013–15
- Roderick Miranda – Servette – 2011–12
- Diogo Monteiro – Servette – 2020–21, 2022–23
- Elton Monteiro – FC Lausanne-Sport – 2016–18, 2020–22
- André Moreira – Grasshopper – 2021–23
- Thierry Moutinho – Servette – 2011–13
- Luís Pimenta – FC Lausanne-Sport – 2013–14
- Roberto Pinto – Grasshopper – 2006–07
- **André Ribeiro** – **St. Gallen** – 2019–
- Ayrton Ribeiro – Thun – 2016–17
- **Tomás Ribeiro** – **Grasshopper** – 2021–
- **Dinis Rodrigues** – **Sion** – 2025–
- Carlos Saleiro – Servette – 2011–12
- **André Santos** – **Grasshopper** – 2021–
- Nuno Santos – Yverdon-Sport – 2000–01
- Daniel Soares – Servette – 2011–12
- **Ronaldo Tavares** – **Yverdon-Sport FC** – 2024–
- Tomás Tavares – Basel – 2021–22
- Jorge Teixeira – Zürich – 2010–14
- Toni – Servette – 2004–05
- **Toti** – **Grasshopper** – 2021–
- Bruno Valente – Neuchâtel Xamax – 2002–05
- **Renato Veiga** – **Basel** – 2023–
- Zé Vítor – St. Gallen – 2007–10

== Republic of Ireland ==
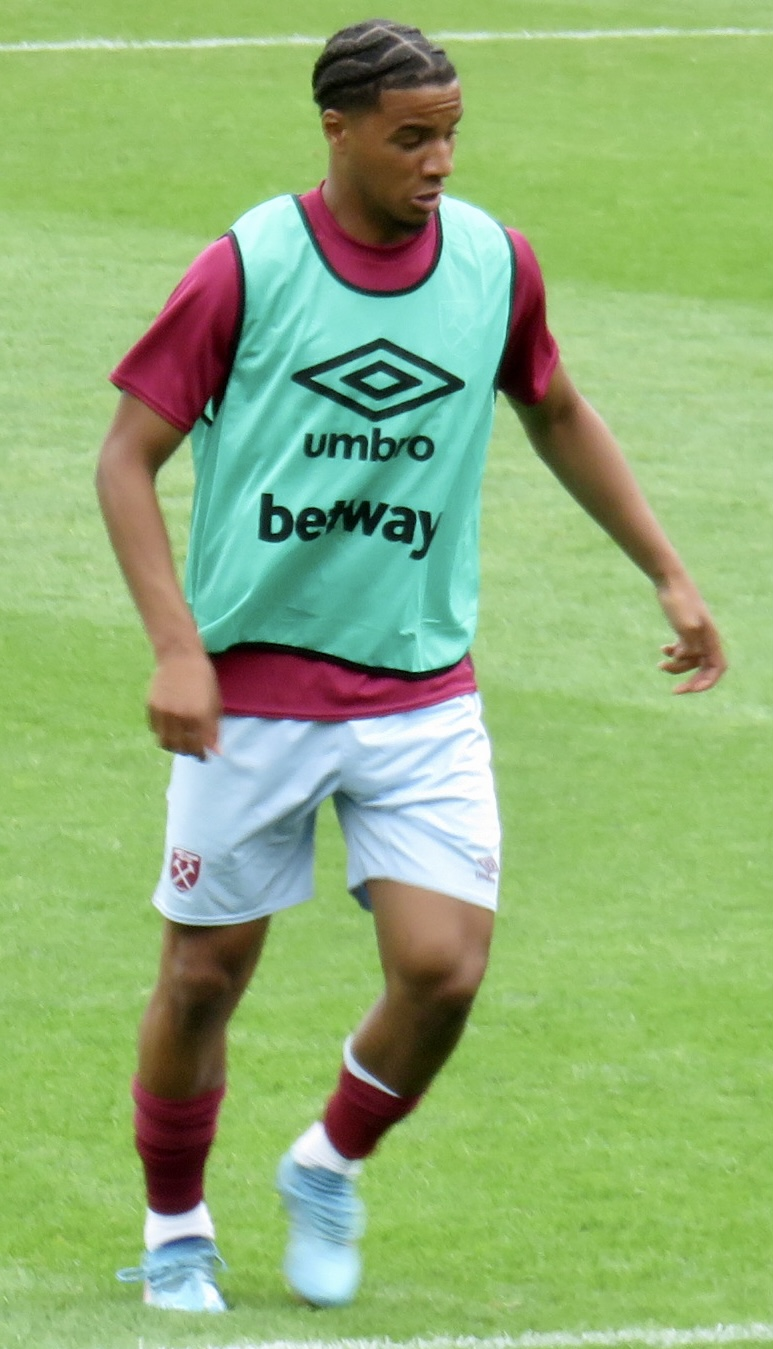
Armstrong Oko-Flex

- Don Givens – Neuchâtel Xamax – 1981–87
- **Armstrong Oko-Flex** – **Zürich** – 2023–

== Romania ==
- Pavel Badea – FC Lausanne-Sport – 1992–95
- Adrian Falub – Basel – 1996–97
- Iulian Filipescu – Zürich – 2003–06
- Ionel Gane – St. Gallen, Grasshopper – 1999–04
- Gábor Gerstenmájer – Luzern – 1993–95
- Ovidiu Herea – Sion – 2013–15
- Cristian Ianu – Aarau, Luzern, Sion – 2007–12, 2014–15
- Adrian Ilie – Zürich – 2004–05
- Rareș Ilie – FC Lausanne-Sport – 2023–24
- Viorel Moldovan – Neuchâtel Xamax, Grasshopper, Servette – 1995–98, 2004–05
- George Ogăraru – Sion – 2010–12
- Ion Olaru – FC Lausanne-Sport – 1992–93
- Daniel Oprița – Aarau – 2008–09
- Basarab Panduru – Neuchâtel Xamax – 1995–96
- Costel Pană – Neuchâtel Xamax – 1995–97
- Wilhelm Possak – Biel, Nordstern Basel – 1932–33, 1934–35
- Dan Potocianu – Servette, Basel – 1997–00
- Mihai Tararache – Grasshopper, Zürich – 1998–06
- Adrian Toader – FC Lausanne-Sport – 1995–96

== Russia ==
- **Fyodor Chalov** – **Basel** – 2021–
- Aleksandr Kerzhakov – Zürich – 2015–16
- Aleksandr Maslov – Neuchâtel Xamax, Sion – 1998–2000
- **Anton Miranchuk** – **Sion** – 2024–
- Anton Mitryushkin – Sion – 2015–20
- Igor Shalimov – Lugano – 1995–96

== Saudi Arabia ==
- Hussein Abdulghani – Neuchâtel Xamax – 2008–09
- **Muhanad Al-Saad** – **FC Lausanne-Sport** – 2025–

== Senegal ==
- Demba Ba – Lugano – 2021–22
- Ibrahima Ba – Thun – 2007–08
- Papa Malick Ba – Basel – 2005–08
- Henri Camara – Neuchâtel Xamax, Grasshopper – 1999–2001
- Mamadou Camara – Bellinzona – 2010–11
- Matar Coly – Neuchâtel Xamax, Young Boys, FC Lausanne-Sport – 2005–06, 2007–10, 2013–14
- Moustapha Dabo – Sion – 2006–07, 2009–10
- Mory Diaw – FC Lausanne-Sport – 2020–22
- Djibril Diop – Yverdon-Sport FC – 2024–25
- Papa Bouba Diop – Neuchâtel Xamax, Grasshopper – 2000–02
- Pape Malick Diop – Neuchâtel Xamax – 2000–01
- **Lamine Diack** – **Sion** – 2025–
- Gora Diouf – Sion – 2022–23, 2024–25
- Moussa Djitté – Sion – 2018–19
- Pape Omar Faye – Thun – 2005–06, 2007–08
- Lamine Gassama – Lausanne Ouchy – 2023–24
- Christian Gomis – Winterthur – 2024–26
- Ibrahima Gueye – Sion – 2015–16
- Saidou Kébé – Zürich, Delémont – 1999–2001, 2002–03
- **Philippe Keny** – **Zürich** – 2025–
- Pape Moussa Konaté – Sion – 2014–18
- Moussa Koné – Zürich – 2015–16, 2017–18
- Kader Mangane – Neuchâtel Xamax, Young Boys – 2001–06, 2007–08
- Alioune Ndoye – Servette – 2024–25
- Ibrahima Ndiaye – Luzern – 2019–23
- **Mouhamed El Bachir Ngom** – Grasshopper – 2025–
- Cheikh Niasse – Young Boys – 2021–25
- Ibrahima Niasse – Neuchâtel Xamax – 2008–11
- Diafra Sakho – Neuchâtel Xamax – 2019–20
- Sangoné Sarr – Zürich – 2014–16, 2017–19
- Kaly Sene – Basel, Grasshoppers, Lausanne-Sport – 2020–26
- Ibrahim Tall – FC Lausanne-Sport – 2011–13
- Pape Thiaw – FC Lausanne-Sport – 2000–02
- Boubacar Traorè – St. Gallen – 2020–22
- Demba Touré – Grasshopper – 2004–09

== Serbia ==
- Danijel Aleksić – St. Gallen – 2015–18
- Nemanja Antonov – Grasshopper – 2015–18
- **Andrej Bacanin** – **Basel** – 2025–
- Nikola Boranijašević – FC Lausanne-Sport, FC Zürich – 2020–24
- Vidak Bratić – St. Gallen – 2008–09
- **Stefan Bukinac** – **Young Boys** – 2025–
- Lazar Ćirković – Luzern – 2017–20
- Nikola Čumić – Luzern – 2021–22
- Dušan Cvetinović – Grasshopper – 2010–11
- Aleksandar Cvetković – Grasshopper – 2017–19
- Darko Damjanović – Wil 1900 – 2002–03
- Ivan Ergić – Basel – 2000–09
- Milan Gajić – Luzern, Zürich, Grasshopper, Young Boys – 2007–17
- Vladimir Golemić – FC Lugano – 2017–18
- Dejan Janjatović – St. Gallen, Vaduz – 2012–17
- Nebojša Joksimović – Neuchâtel Xamax – 2007–08
- **Djordje Jovanović** – **Basel** – 2023–
- Andrija Kaluđerović – Thun – 2014–15
- Dimitrije Kamenović – Yverdon-Sport FC – 2023–25
- Ilija Katić – Zürich, Neuchâtel Xamax – 1973–76, 1977–78
- Miloš Krstić – Thun – 2012–14
- Sanijel Kucani – St. Gallen – 2015–16
- Zdravko Kuzmanović – Basel – 2005–07, 2015–16, 2018–20
- Leo Lerinc – St. Gallen – 2002–03
- Radomir Milosavljević – Lugano – 2017–18
- Jovan Milošević – St. Gallen – 2023–24
- Dragan Mrđa – Sion – 2010–13
- Ognjen Mudrinski – Aarau – 2014–15
- Đorđe Nikolić – Basel, FC Thun – 2016–18, 2019–21
- Goran Obradović – Servette, St. Gallen, Sion – 2001–05, 2006–12
- Strahinja Pavlović – Basel – 2021–22
- Marko Perović – Basel – 2007–09
- Aleksandar Prijović – Sion, FC Lausanne-Sport – 2009–12
- Samir Ramizi – Servette, Xamax, Winterthur – 2012–13, 2018–20, 2022–24
- **Milan Rodić** – **Zürich** – 2025–
- Slobodan Santrač – Grasshopper – 1974–76
- Dejan Sorgić – Luzern, Thun, Sion – 2006–07, 2008–13, 2016–23, 2024–25
- Aleksandar Stanković – Luzern – 2024–25
- Miralem Sulejmani – Young Boys – 2015–20
- **Nemanja Tošić** – **Zürich** – 2024–25
- Vaso Vasić – Grasshopper – 2014–18
- Dušan Veškovac – Luzern, Young Boys – 2007–14
- Vladan Vidaković – Yverdon-Sport – 2023–25
- Milan Vilotić – Grasshopper, Young Boys, St. Gallen – 2012–19

== Sierra Leone ==
- Umaru Bangura – Zürich – 2017–21
- Mohamed Kallon – Lugano – 1995–97

== Slovakia ==
- Michal Faško – Grasshopper – 2017–18
- Ľubomír Guldan – Thun – 2007–08
- Christián Herc – Grasshopper – 2021–23
- **Jakub Kadak** – **Luzern** – 2022–
- Miroslav König – Grasshopper, Basel, Zürich – 1999–2003
- Peter Lérant – Luzern – 2000–01
- **Samuel Mráz** – **Servette** – 2025–
- Ľubomír Tupta – Sion – 2020–21
- Marián Zeman – Grasshopper – 1999–2000

== Slovenia ==
- Džengis Čavušević – St. Gallen, Zürich – 2012–16, 2017–18
- **Žan Celar** – Lugano, **Basel** – 2021–24, 2026–
- Domen Črnigoj – Zürich – 2015–20
- Kenan Fatkič – Thun – 2018–20
- Blaž Kramer – Zürich – 2019–22
- Klemen Lavrič – St. Gallen – 2010–11
- Sandi Lovrić – Lugano – 2019–22
- Miha Mevlja – FC Lausanne-Sport – 2013–14
- Denis Popović – Zürich – 2019–20
- Ermin Šiljak – Servette – 1998–2001
- Andraž Šporar – Basel – 2015–17
- Sašo Udovič – FC Lausanne-Sport – 2001–02

== South Africa ==
- Delron Buckley – Basel – 2006–07
- Shaun Bartlett – Zürich – 1998–2000
- Stanton Fredericks – Grasshopper – 2000–01
- George Koumantarakis – Luzern, Basel – 1998–2003
- Thomas Madigage – Zürich – 1990–91
- August Makalakalane – Zürich – 1990–92
- Phil Masinga – St. Gallen – 1996–97
- Ivan McKinley – Neuchâtel Xamax – 1994–95
- Teboho Mokoena – St. Gallen – 2001–02
- Joel Untersee – Vaduz, Zürich – 2014–16, 2018–19

== South Korea ==
- Park Joo-ho – Basel – 2011–13
- Park Jung-bin – Servette – 2019–20
- Jeong Sang-bin – Grasshopper – 2021–23
- **Lee Young-jun** – **Grasshopper** – 2024–

== Spain ==
- Ángel Javier Arizmendi – Neuchâtel Xamax – 2011–12
- Manuel Calvo – Aarau – 2000–02
- Álex Carbonell – Luzern – 2020–21
- **Óscar Clemente** – **Grasshopper** – 2025–
- Arnau Comas – Basel – 2022–25
- Jonathan Dubasin – Basel – 2023–24
- Gabri – Sion, FC Lausanne-Sport – 2011–14
- Alexandre Geijo – Neuchâtel Xamax – 2000–01
- Adrià Guerrero – Lugano – 2020–21
- Kevin Carlos – Yverdon-Sport – 2023–26
- **Omar Janneh** – **FC Lausanne-Sport** – 2025–
- Diego León – Grasshopper – 2006–08
- Sergio López – Basel – 2021–24
- **Genís Montolio** – **Thun** – 2025–
- David Navarro – Neuchâtel Xamax – 2011–12
- Hugo Novoa – Basel – 2022–23
- **Jordi Quintillà** – **St. Gallen**, Basel – 2018–
- Marco Pérez – Basel, Delemont – 1997–2000
- Víctor Ruiz – St. Gallen – 2018–25
- Víctor Sánchez – Neuchâtel Xamax – 2011–12
- Maikel Santana – Neuchâtel Xamax – 2018–19
- Néstor Susaeta – FC Lausanne-Sport – 2011–12
- Guillermo Vallori – Grasshopper – 2007–12
- Carlos Varela – Servette, Basel, Aarau, Young Boys, Neuchâtel Xamax – 1991–2012

== Suriname ==
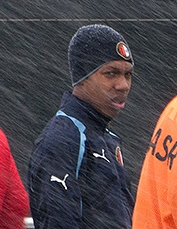
Jean-Paul Boëtius

- Jean-Paul Boëtius – Basel – 2015–17

== Sweden ==
- **Jeremy Agbonifo** – **Basel** – 2025–
- Mattias Andersson – Sion – 2019–20
- Nabil Bahoui – Grasshopper – 2017–19
- Erol Bekir – Young Boys, Lugano – 1995–99
- Emil Bergström – Grasshopper, Basel – 2016–18, 2019–20
- Tomas Brolin – Zürich – 1995–96
- Dusan Djuric – Zürich, Aarau – 2007–12, 2014–15
- Alexander Farnerud – Young Boys – 2010–13
- Alexander Fransson – Basel, FC Lausanne-Sport – 2015–18
- Alexander Gerndt – Young Boys, Lugano – 2012–21
- Ove Grahn – Grasshopper, FC Lausanne-Sport – 1966–76
- Linus Hallenius – Aarau – 2013–14
- Mikael Ishak – St. Gallen – 2012–13
- Kim Källström – Grasshopper – 2015–17
- Benjamin Kibebe – Luzern – 2010–12
- Benjamin Kimpioka – Luzern – 2022–23
- Roger Ljung – Young Boys, Zürich – 1989–91
- **Jesper Löfgren** – **Luzern** – 2023–
- Mats Magnusson – Servette – 1985–86
- Richard Magyar – Aarau – 2014–15
- Daniel Majstorović – Basel – 2005–08
- Joe Mendes – Basel – 2024–25
- Nikolaj Möller – St. Gallen – 2023–25
- Noah Persson – Young Boys – 2023–25
- **Elias Pihlström** – **Lugano** – 2025–
- Stefan Rehn – FC Lausanne-Sport – 1995–2000
- **Jamie Roche** – **FC Lausanne-Sport** – 2023–
- Behrang Safari – Basel – 2008–11, 2013–16
- Emra Tahirović – Zürich – 2007–11
- Jonas Thern – Zürich – 1987–88
- Conny Torstensson – Zürich – 1977–78

== Thailand ==
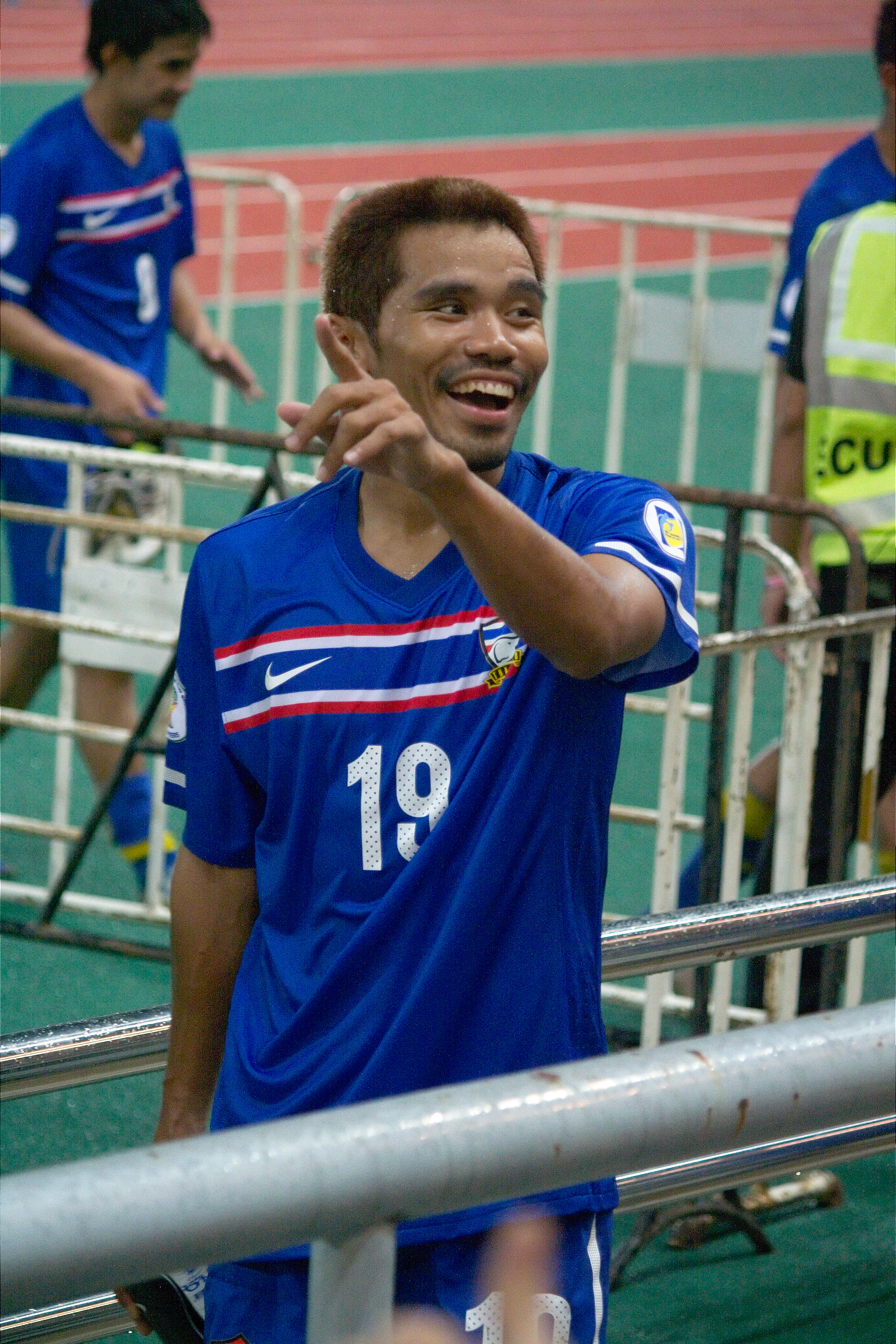
Suree Sukha

- Suree Sukha – Grasshopper – 2007–08

== Togo ==
- Yao Aziawonou – Sion, Basel, Thun, Servette, Young Boys, Luzern – 1998–99, 2000–07
- Mohamed Kader – Lugano, Servette – 1999–2000, 2002–04
- Thibault Klidjé – Luzern – 2022–25
- Yao Junior Sènaya – Thun – 2005–06

== Tunisia ==
- Mohamed Belhadj Mahmoud – Lugano – 2021–26
- Wajdi Bouazzi – FC Lausanne-Sport – 2013–14
- Aymen Bouchhioua – Aarau – 2007–08
- **Dylan Bronn** – **Servette** – 2023–24, 2025–
- Seifedin Chabbi – St. Gallen – 2016–17
- Amine Chermiti – Zürich – 2009–16
- Yassine Chikhaoui – Zürich – 2007–15
- Oussama Darragi – Sion – 2012–13
- Mohamed Dräger – Luzern, Basel – 2021–25
- Ismaël Gharbi – Lausanne Ouchy – 2023–24
- Saïf Ghezal – Young Boys, Thun – 2007–10, 2011–13
- Mohamed Gouaida – St. Gallen – 2016–17
- Karim Haggui – St. Gallen – 2016–18
- Ammar Jemal – Young Boys – 2010–11
- Sliman Kchouk – St. Gallen – 2018–19
- Salim Khelifi – FC Lausanne-Sport, Zürich – 2011–14, 2018–20
- Sayfallah Ltaief – Basel, Winterthur – 2022–24
- Ferid Matri – Zürich – 2013–15
- Yassin Mikari – Grasshopper, Luzern – 2001–03, 2006–09, 2013–14
- Stéphane Nater – Servette, St. Gallen – 2011–14
- Francileudo Santos – Zürich – 2006–07
- **Yan Valery** – **Young Boys** – 2025–
- Chaker Zouaghi – Zürich – 2010–12

== Turkey ==
- Harun Alpsoy – Grasshoppers – 2015–17
- Çağdaş Atan – Basel – 2009–11
- Tunahan Cicek – St. Gallen – 2010–11
- Batuhan Karadeniz – St. Gallen – 2015–16
- Berkan Kutlu – Sion – 2019–20
- Ercüment Şahin – Zürich, Chiasso – 1990–91, 1992–94
- Serkan Şahin – Basel – 2008–10
- Dilaver Satılmış – Luzern, Wil 1900 – 1999–2000, 2002–03
- Salih Uçan – Sion – 2017–18

== Ukraine ==
- Yevhen Lutsenko – FC Lausanne-Sport – 1999–2002
- Serhiy Skachenko – Neuchâtel Xamax, Aarau – 2000–01, 2002–03
- **Bohdan Vyunnyk** – **Zürich** – 2022–

== United States ==
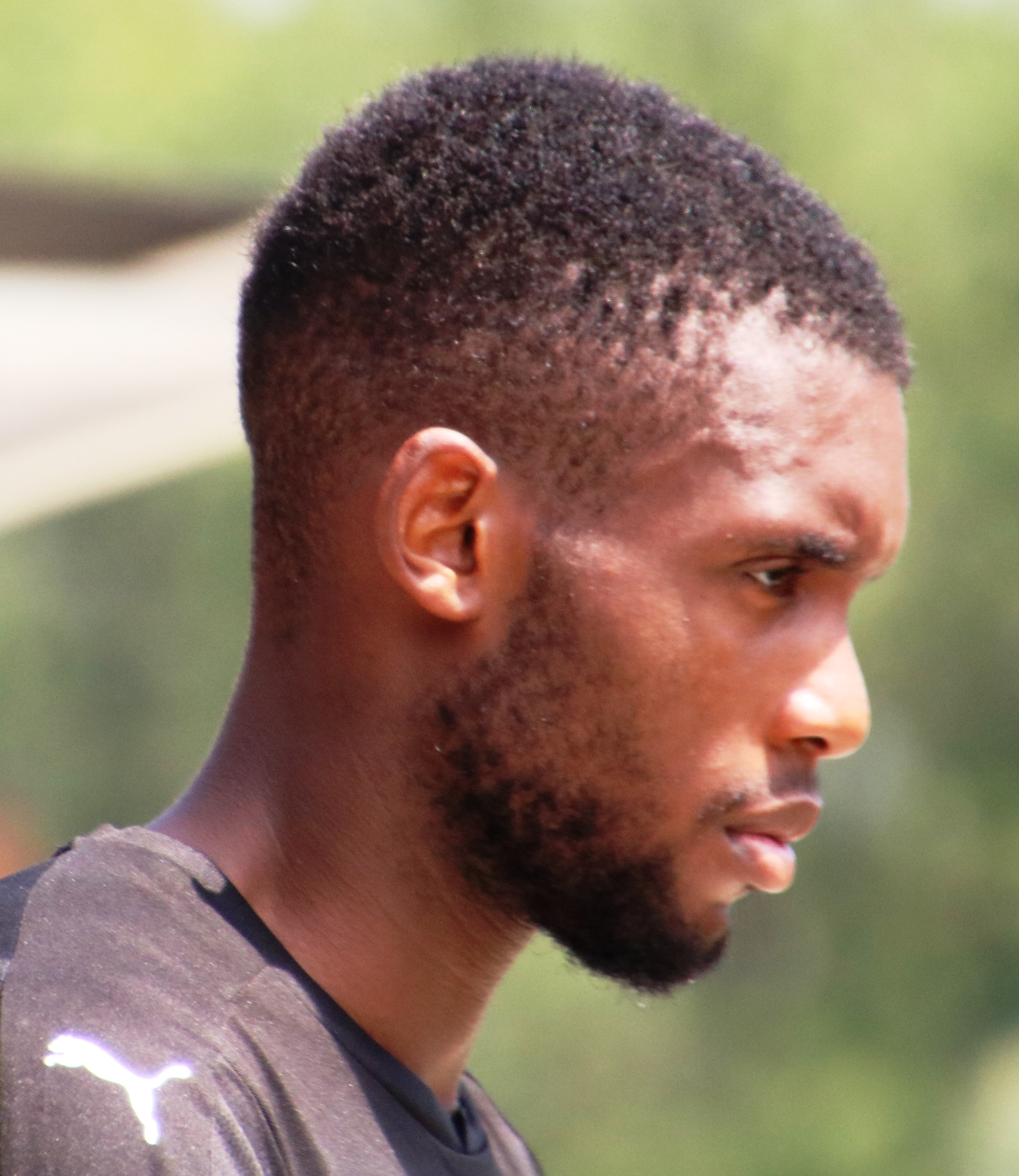
Jordan Pefok

- Johann Angstmann – Lugano – 2022–23
- Konrad de la Fuente – FC Lausanne-Sport – 2024–27
- Frankie Hejduk – St. Gallen – 2001–02
- **John Hilton** – **Grasshopper** – 2026–
- Kekuta Manneh – St. Gallen – 2018–19
- Jordan Pefok – Young Boys – 2020–22
- Caleb Stanko – Vaduz – 2016–17

== Uruguay ==
- Rodrigo Aguirre – Lugano – 2016–17
- Joaquín Ardaiz – Lugano – 2020–21
- Fernando Carreño – Young Boys, Aarau – 2004–07
- Franco González – Yverdon-Sport – 2024–25
- Andrés Lamas – Luzern – 2014–15
- Matías Malvino – Lugano – 2015–16
- Kevin Méndez – FC Lausanne-Sport – 2016–17
- Richard Núñez – Grasshopper – 2001–04
- Rodrigo Pollero – Zürich, FC Lausanne-Sport – 2021–22
- Enzo Ruiz – Grasshopper, Bellinzona – 2009–13
- Jonathan Sabbatini – Lugano – 2015–24
- **Cristian Souza** – **Sion** – 2024–

== Uzbekistan ==
- Bekruz Karimov - FC Lugano - 2026-

== Venezuela ==
- Gabriel Cichero – Sion – 2013–14, 2015–16
- **Sergio Córdova** – **Young Boys** – 2025–
- Frank Feltscher – Grasshopper, Bellinzona, Aarau – 2006–15
- Rolf Feltscher – Grasshopper, FC Lausanne-Sport – 2007–10, 2013–14
- Alexander David González – Young Boys, Aarau, Thun – 2011–16
- Josef Martínez – Young Boys, Thun – 2011–14
- Andrés Ponce – Lugano – 2016–17
- Pedro Antonio Ramírez – Sion – 2014–15
- Jeffrén Suárez – Grasshopper – 2017–19

== Zambia ==
- Miguel Chaiwa – Young Boys – 2022–25
- Emmanuel Mayuka – Young Boys – 2010–12
- Nathan Sinkala – Grasshopper – 2014–15
- Fwayo Tembo – Basel – 2010–12

== Zimbabwe ==
- Benjani Mwaruwari – Grasshopper – 2001–02
- Adam Ndlovu – Kriens, Delémont, Zürich – 1997–98, 1999–2001
- Agent Sawu – Kriens, Luzern, Young Boys, Basel – 1993–2000

== Notes ==
1. Born in Algeria
2. Born in Argentina
3. Born in Austria
4. Born in Austria (then part of Austria-Hungary)
5. Born in the Bahamas
6. Born in Belgium
7. Born in Bosnia and Herzegovina (then part of the SFR Yugoslavia)
8. Born in Brazil
9. Born in Burundi
10. Born in Cameroon
11. Born in Chad
12. Born in Croatia
13. Born in Croatia (then part of the SFR Yugoslavia)
14. Born in the Democratic Republic of Congo
15. Born in the Democratic Republic of Congo (then Zaïre)
16. Born in Djibouti
17. Born in England
18. Born in Ethiopia
19. Born in France
20. Born in the French Guiana (Overseas department of the French Republic)
21. Born in Georgia
22. Born in Germany
23. Born in Ghana
24. Born in Greece
25. Born in Guadeloupe (Overseas department of the French Republic)
26. Born in Guinea-Bissau
27. Born in Haiti
28. Born in Iran
29. Born in Israel
30. Born in Ivory Coast
31. Born in Italy
32. Born in Kazakhstan (then part of the Soviet Union)
33. Born in Kenya
34. Born in Kosovo (then part of the SFR Yugoslavia)
35. Born in Kosovo (then part of the FR Yugoslavia)
36. Born in Libya
37. Born in Mali
38. Born in Morocco
39. Born in the Netherlands
40. Born in New Caledonia (Overseas territory of the French Republic)
41. Born in Nigeria
42. Born in Poland
43. Born in Portugal
44. Born in the Republic of Macedonia
45. Born in the Republic of Macedonia (then part of the SFR Yugoslavia)
46. Born in Réunion (Overseas department of the French Republic)
47. Born in Russia
48. Born in Scotland
49. Born in Senegal
50. Born in Serbia (then part of the SFR Yugoslavia)
51. Born in Serbia (then part of the FR Yugoslavia)
52. Born in Sierra Leone
53. Born in Slovakia (then part of Czechoslovakia)
54. Born in Slovenia
55. Born in Spain
56. Born in Sweden
57. Born in Switzerland
58. Born in Tanzania
59. Born in The Gambia
60. Born in the US
61. Born in West Germany (now part of Germany)
62. Capped for the Albania national football team
63. Capped for the Albania national under-21 football team
64. Capped for the Albania national under-19 football team
65. Capped for the Albania national under-17 football team
66. Capped for the Algeria national under-18 football team
67. Capped for the Austria national under-21 football team
68. Capped for the Austria national under-19 football team
69. Capped for the Austria national under-18 football team
70. Capped for the Austria national under-17 football team
71. Capped for the Austria national under-16 football team
72. Capped for the Belgium national football team
73. Capped for the Belgium national under-21 football team
74. Capped for the Belgium national under-20 football team
75. Capped for the Belgium national under-19 football team
76. Capped for the Belgium national under-18 football team
77. Capped for the Belgium national under-17 football team
78. Capped for the Belgium national under-16 football team
79. Capped for the Belgium national under-15 football team
80. Capped for the Cameroon national football team
81. Capped for the Catalonia national football team
82. Capped for the Costa Rica national football team
83. Capped for the Croatia national football team
84. Capped for the Croatia national under-21 football team
85. Capped for the Democratic Republic of the Congo national football team
86. Capped for the England national under-16 football team
87. Capped for the France national under-21 football team
88. Capped for the France national under-20 football team
89. Capped for the France national under-19 football team
90. Capped for the France national under-18 football team
91. Capped for the France national under-17 football team
92. Capped for the France national under-16 football team
93. Capped for the Germany national under-20 football team
94. Capped for the Germany national under-19 football team
95. Capped for the Germany national under-18 football team
96. Capped for the Germany national under-17 football team
97. Capped for the Germany national under-16 football team
98. Capped for the Germany national under-15 football team
99. Capped for the Italy national under-18 football team
100. Capped for the Italy national under-17 football team
101. Capped for the Italy national under-16 football team
102. Capped for the Kosovo national football team
103. Capped for the Liechtenstein national football team
104. Capped for the Netherlands national football team
105. Capped for the Netherlands national under-21 football team
106. Capped for the Netherlands national under-19 football team
107. Capped for the Netherlands national under-18 football team
108. Capped for the Netherlands national under-17 football team
109. Capped for the North Macedonia national football team
110. Capped for the North Macedonia national under-21 football team
111. Capped for the North Macedonia national under-19 football team
112. Capped for the North Macedonia national under-18 football team
113. Capped for the North Macedonia national under-17 football team
114. Capped for the North Macedonia national under-15 football team
115. Capped for the Norway national football team
116. Capped for the Norway national under-23 football team
117. Capped for the Norway national under-21 football team
118. Capped for the Norway national under-19 football team
119. Capped for the Norway national under-18 football team
120. Capped for the Norway national under-17 football team
121. Capped for the Norway national under-16 football team
122. Capped for the Norway national under-15 football team
123. Capped for the Portugal national under-20 football team
124. Capped for the Romania national under-17 football team
125. Capped for the Romania national under-16 football team
126. Capped for the Scotland national under-16 football team
127. Capped for the Scotland national under-15 football team
128. Capped for the Senegal national under-17 football team
129. Capped for the Spain national under-21 football team
130. Capped for the Spain national under-20 football team
131. Capped for the Spain national under-19 football team
132. Capped for the Spain national under-19 football team
133. Capped for the Spain national under-17 football team
134. Capped for the Spain national under-16 football team
135. Capped for the Spain national under-15 football team
136. Capped for the Serbia national under-21 football team
137. Capped for the Sweden national football team
138. Capped for the Sweden national under-21 football team
139. Capped for the Sweden national under-17 football team
140. Capped for the Switzerland national football team
141. Capped for the Switzerland national under-23 football team
142. Capped for the Switzerland national under-21 football team
143. Capped for the Switzerland national under-20 football team
144. Capped for the Switzerland national under-19 football team
145. Capped for the Switzerland national under-18 football team
146. Capped for the Switzerland national under-17 football team
147. Capped for the Switzerland national under-16 football team
148. Capped for the Switzerland national under-15 football team
149. Capped for the Ukraine national under-21 football team
150. Capped for the United States men's national under-23 soccer team
