= Lapenda =

Lapenda is a surname. Notable people with the surname include:

- Frederico Lapenda (born 1968), American film producer
- Geraldo Lapenda (1924–2004), Brazilian linguist
- Luka Lapenda (born 1988), Swiss footballer
