= Spahiu =

Spahiu is an Albanian surname. Notable people with the surname include:

- Albert Spahiu (born 1990), Kosovar-Swiss football striker
- Avni Spahiu (born 1953), Kosovar diplomat and television director
- Bedri Spahiu (1908–1998), Albanian politician
- Bujar Spahiu (born 1976), Albanian Muslim scholar
- Ekrem Spahiu (born 1960), Albanian politician
- Gabriel Spahiu (born 1968), Romanian actor of Kosoven descent
- Kreshnik Spahiu (born 1969), Albanian lawyer and politician
- Rexhep Spahiu (1923–1993), Albanian football player and coach
- Sebastjan Spahiu (born 1999), Albanian association football player
- Xhafer Spahiu (1923–1999), Albanian politician
- Xhevahir Spahiu (born 1945), Albanian poet

== See also ==
- Sipahi, Turkish professional cavalrymen
