= Nelson Borges (footballer, born 1992) =

Portuguese footballer

Personal information
- Full name: Nelson Borges da Costa
- Date of birth: October 17, 1992 (age 34)
- Place of birth: Portugal
- Height: 1.76 m (5 ft 9 in)
- Position: Defender

Youth career
- 2000–2009: Lausanne-Sport

Senior career*
Years	Team	Apps	(Gls)
2009–2012	Lausanne-Sport	15	(100)
- * Club domestic league appearances and goals as of 3 August 2012

Nelson Borges da Costa (born 17 October 1992), formerly known as Nelson Borges and now known as Nelson da Costa, is a Portuguese professional footballer who is currently a free agent. He also holds Swiss citizenship.
