= Soheil Arghandewall =

German footballer

Personal information
- Date of birth: 19 August 2001 (age 25)
- Place of birth: Münster, Germany
- Position: Midfielder

Youth career
- Preußen Münster
- –2020: FC Zürich

Senior career*
Years	Team	Apps	(Gls)
2019–2022	Zürich U21	31	(2)
2020	Zürich	1	(0)
2022–2024	YF Juventus	50	(2)
- * Club domestic league appearances and goals as of 01:41, 4 July 2024 (UTC)

Soheil Arghandewall (born 19 August 2001) is a German professional footballer who most recently played as a midfielder for Swiss club YF Juventus.

== Career statistics ==
As of 20 July 2020

Appearances and goals by club, season and competition
Club	Season	League			Cup		Continental		Other		Total	
Club	Season	Division	Apps	Goals	Apps	Goals	Apps	Goals	Apps	Goals	Apps	Goals
FC Zürich U21	2019–20	Swiss Promotion League	7	0	0	0	–		0	0	7	0
FC Zürich	2019–20	Swiss Super League	1	0	0	0	–		0	0	1	0
Career total			8	0	0	0	0	0	0	0	8	0
