= Daniel Břežný =

Czech footballer (born 1977)

Personal information
- Date of birth: 19 December 1977 (age 48)
- Place of birth: Czechoslovakia
- Height: 1.83 m (6 ft 0 in)
- Position: Defender

Senior career*
Years	Team	Apps	(Gls)
1999–2002	FC Zbrojovka Brno	10	(0)
2003–2004	1. FC Slovácko		
2004–2005	Niki Volos F.C.		
2005–2006	FK Drnovice		
2006–2007	Dolni Bojanovice		
2007	1. FC Brno		
2007	FC Shakhter Karagandy		
2008	SK Kladno		
2008–2009	FC Vaduz		
- * Club domestic league appearances and goals

Daniel Břežný (born 19 December 1977) is a Czech former footballer.
