= Damian Seweryn =

Polish footballer

Personal information
- Full name: Damian Seweryn
- Date of birth: 30 September 1979 (age 47)
- Place of birth: Poznań, Poland
- Height: 1.77 m (5 ft 9 1/2 in)
- Position: Midfielder

Youth career
- SKS 13 Poznań

Senior career*
Years	Team	Apps	(Gls)
1997–1998	Olimpia Poznań		
1998–1999	Karkonosze Jelenia Góra		
1999–2001	BSC Young Boys	30	(3)
2002–2003	Widzew Łódź	27	(2)
2003	Poseidon Neon Poron	10	(1)
2004	Widzew Łódź	12	(0)
2004–2005	Szczakowianka Jaworzno	24	(5)
2005	Polonia Warsaw	8	(0)
2006–2007	Górnik Zabrze	32	(2)
2007–2008	Odra Wodzisław	41	(3)
2008–2009	Piast Gliwice	12	(0)
2010	Warta Poznań	13	(2)
2010–2012	ŁKS Łódź	10	(0)
2013	GKS Dopiewo	9	(5)
2014	Pogoń Lwówek		
- * Club domestic league appearances and goals

Damian Seweryn (born 30 September 1979) is a Polish former professional footballer who played as a midfielder.

== Career ==
In June 2010, he joined ŁKS Łódź on a two-year contract.

== Honours ==
ŁKS Łódź

- I liga: 2010–11
