= Emir Sinanović =

Bosnian-Swiss footballer (born 1988)

Personal information
- Full name: Emir Sinanović
- Date of birth: 24 October 1988 (age 38)
- Place of birth: Brĉko, Bosnia and Herzegovina
- Height: 1.90 m (6 ft 3 in)
- Position: Midfielder

Team information
- Current team: SC Schöftland (assistant)

Youth career
- 2007–2008: Aarau

Senior career*
Years	Team	Apps	(Gls)
2006–2011	Aarau	35	(2)
2006	→ Olten (loan)	13	(0)
2011–2012	Wangen bei Olten	10	(0)
2012–2013	Baden	38	(6)
2013–2014	Naters	23	(3)
2014–2015	Muri	36	(14)
2016	Baden	12	(0)
2016–2017	Young Fellows Juventus	18	(4)
2017–2018	Kosova	5	(0)
2018–2020	Schötz	27	(1)
2020–2021	Rothrist		
2021–2023	Suhr		

Managerial career
- 2023–: SC Schöftland (assistant)
- * Club domestic league appearances and goals

Emir Sinanović (born 24 October 1988) is a retired Bosnian–Swiss footballer.

== Career ==
=== Club career ===
After playing at the highest level in Switzerland with Aarau, he had two spells with Baden and played for FC Naters and Young Fellows Juventus.

Sinanović also played for lower league sides Muri and Schötz and he joined Rothrist in summer 2020. He ended his career in 2023 at FC Suhr.

=== Coaching career ===
After retiring from football at the end of the 2022–23 season, Sinanović started his coaching career at SC Schöftland, where he was appointed assistant coach.
