= Mehmed Begzadić =

Swiss-Bosnian footballer (born 1993)

Personal information
- Date of birth: January 5, 1993 (age 33)
- Place of birth: Bosnia and Herzegovina
- Height: 1.80 m (5 ft 11 in)
- Position: Centre forward

Team information
- Current team: Bavois
- Number: 9

Youth career
- –2011: Yverdon-Sport
- 2011–2012: Lausanne-Sport

Senior career*
| Years | Team | Apps | (Gls) |
| 2009–2011 | Yverdon-Sport | 16 | (1) |
| 2010 | → Baulmes (loan) | 1 | (0) |
| 2012–2013 | Team Vaud U21 | 13 | (15) |
| 2012–2014 | Lausanne-Sport | 1 | (0) |
| 2013–2014 | → Locarno (loan) | 19 | (1) |
| 2014–2015 | Locarno | | |
| 2015 | Stade Nyonnais | 34 | (1) |
| 2016 | Yverdon-Sport | 9 | (4) |
| 2016–2017 | FC Azzurri LS 90 | 21 | (8) |
| 2017–2019 | Echallens | 48 | (15) |
| 2019– | Bavois | 147 | (22) |

International career
| 2011 | Switzerland U19 | 2 | (1) |
- * Club domestic league appearances and goals as of 22 June 2026

Mehmed Begzadić (born 5 January 1993) is a Swiss and Bosnian-Herzegovinian professional footballer currently playing for FC Bavois.

== Club career ==
Begzadić began his playing career at Yverdon-Sport FC and rose through the youth ranks, soon playing regularly for the reserve team and making a breakthrough into their first team in 2010. He made his league debut for Yverdon-Sport on 14 April 2010 against Servette FC in a 2–1 loss. In the later part of the 2009–10 season, Begzadić went on loan to FC Baulmes, making one appearance. Following his time at Yverdon, he transferred to Swiss Super League club FC Lausanne-Sport in July 2011. He made his league debut for Lausanne-Sport on 21 July 2012 in a 1–0 home loss against FC St. Gallen, coming on as a substitute for the final 19 minutes. During the 2012–13 season, Begzadić also featured for the reserve team.

== International career ==
Despite having played for Switzerland at under-19 level, Begzadić decided to change his allegiance in order to compete for Bosnia and Herzegovina. He was called up for the under-21 team in order to play a practice match against the under-19 team in February 2013.
