= Albert Spahiu =

Greek - Swiss footballer (born 1990)

Personal information
- Date of birth: 3 August 1990 (age 36)
- Place of birth: Pristina, SFR Yugoslavia
- Position: Striker

Team information
- Current team: FC Naters
- Number: 9

Youth career
- Rot-Schwarz Thun
- –2009: FC Thun

Senior career*
Years	Team	Apps	(Gls)
2009–2011	BSC Young Boys	1	(0)
2011–2012	FSV Mainz 05 II	19	(1)
2012–2013	Lokomotive Leipzig	25	(7)
2013–2015	FC Köniz	15	(0)
2015–	FC Naters	129	(38)
- * Club domestic league appearances and goals as of 2 February 2021

Albert Spahiu (born 3 August 1990) is a Kosovan-Swiss footballer who plays as a striker for FC Naters.
