= Luka Lapenda =

Swiss footballer (born 1988)

Personal information
- Date of birth: 1 January 1988 (age 38)
- Place of birth: Rijeka, Croatia
- Height: 1.96 m (6 ft 5 in)
- Position: Forward

Senior career*
Years	Team	Apps	(Gls)
2006–2007	FC Basel U-21	15	(1)
2007–2010	Grasshopper	1	(0)
2010–	FC Croatia Zürich		
- * Club domestic league appearances and goals as of 30 December 2010

Luka Lapenda (born 1 January 1988) is a Swiss football forward who played for Grasshopper Club Zürich in the Swiss Super League. In September 2010 he joined FC Croatia of the Swiss 3. Liga (sixth tier).
