= List of Swiss football transfers summer 2022 =

This is a list of Swiss football transfers for the 2022 summer transfer window. Only transfers featuring Swiss Super League are listed.

== Swiss Super League ==
Note: Flags indicate national team as has been defined under FIFA eligibility rules. Players may hold more than one non-FIFA nationality.

=== Zürich ===
In:

No.	Pos.	Nation	Player
8	MF	NOR	Ole Selnæs (from (China) Shenzhen)
9	FW	CRO	Ivan Santini (from (Saudi Arabia) Al-Fateh)
11	FW	COD	Jonathan Okita (from (Netherlands) NEC)
17	MF	GUI	Cheick Condé (from (Czech Republic) Trinity Zlín)

Out:

No.	Pos.	Nation	Player
5	DF	SUI	Silvan Wallner (on loan to Wil)
9	FW	GAM	Assan Ceesay (to (Italy) Lecce)
18	FW	SVN	Blaž Kramer (to (Poland) Legia Warsaw)
20	MF	CIV	Ousmane Doumbia (to Lugano)
24	MF	CRO	Ante Ćorić (loan return to (Italy) Roma)
26	MF	TUN	Salim Khelifi (free agent)
78	MF	GER	Moritz Leitner (free agent)
—	DF	SUI	Filip Frei (free agent, previously on loan at Wil)
—	MF	SUI	Izer Aliu (to Neuchâtel Xamax, previously on loan at Kriens)

=== Basel ===
In:

No.	Pos.	Nation	Player
1	GK	SUI	Marwin Hitz (from (Germany) Borussia Dortmund)
4	DF	ESP	Arnau Comas (from (Spain) Barcelona B)
9	FW	SUI	Zeki Amdouni (on loan from Lausanne)
10	FW	FRA	Jean-Kévin Augustin (from (France) Nantes)
13	GK	SUI	Mirko Salvi (from Yverdon)
16	GK	SUI	Nils de Mol (from Wil)
21	DF	FRA	Andy Pelmard (from (France) Nice, previously on loan)
25	MF	TUN	Sayfallah Ltaief (from Winterthur)
27	FW	SUI	Dan Ndoye (from (France) Nice, previously on loan)
28	DF	FRA	Hugo Vogel (from (France) Lyon B)
30	MF	GER	Anton Kade (from (Germany) Hertha BSC)
—	MF	GER	Adriano Onyegbule (from (Germany) RB Leipzig youth)

Out:

No.	Pos.	Nation	Player
1	GK	AUT	Heinz Lindner (to Sion)
7	MF	SUI	Pajtim Kasami (free agent)
9	FW	ITA	Sebastiano Esposito (loan return to (Italy) Inter Milan)
14	MF	SUI	Valentin Stocker (retired)
15	DF	SRB	Strahinja Pavlović (loan return to (France) Monaco)
28	DF	ITA	Raoul Petretta (to (Turkey) Kasımpaşa)
35	MF	ARG	Matías Palacios (to (United Arab Emirates) Al Ain)
44	GK	SUI	Tim Spycher (on loan to Yverdon)
46	GK	GER	Felix Gebhardt (on loan to (Germany) Hallescher FC)
76	DF	SUI	Albian Hajdari (loan return to (Italy) Juventus)

=== Young Boys ===
In:

No.	Pos.	Nation	Player
7	MF	SUI	Filip Ugrinic (from Luzern)
11	FW	SUI	Cedric Itten (from (Scotland) Rangers)
14	MF	ZAM	Miguel Chaiwa (from (Zambia) Shamuel)
17	DF	SUI	Kevin Rüegg (on loan from (Italy) Hellas Verona, previously on loan at Lugano)
22	MF	KOS	Donat Rrudhani (from Aarau)
23	DF	SUI	Loris Benito (from Sion)
40	GK	SUI	Dario Marzino (from Schaffhausen)

Out:

No.	Pos.	Nation	Player
7	MF	HUN	Kevin Varga (loan return to (Turkey) Kasımpaşa)
10	FW	SRB	Miralem Sulejmani (free agent)
11	MF	SUI	Edimilson Fernandes (loan return to (Germany) Mainz 05)
17	FW	USA	Jordan Pefok (to (Germany) Union Berlin)
22	MF	SUI	Nico Maier (on loan to Wil)
91	GK	SUI	Guillaume Faivre (retired)
—	MF	SUI	Mischa Eberhard (on loan to Aarau, previously on loan at Yverdon)
—	FW	SUI	Yannick Toure (on loan to Thun, previously on loan at Wil)
—	DF	SUI	Nicolas Bürgy (to (Denmark) Viborg, previously on loan)
—	DF	SUI	Pascal Schüpbach (to Breitenrain, previously on loan at Thun)
—	MF	SUI	Michel Aebischer (to (Italy) Bologna, previously on loan)
—	MF	LUX	Christopher Martins (to (Russia) Spartak Moscow, previously on loan)
—	FW	SUI	Shkelqim Vladi (to Aarau, previously on loan)

=== Lugano ===
In:

No.	Pos.	Nation	Player
5	DF	SUI	Albian Hajdari (on loan from (Italy) Juventus, previously on loan at Basel)
15	DF	GER	Lars Lukas Mai (from (Germany) Bayern Munich, previously on loan at (Germany) Werder Bremen)
18	MF	FRA	Hicham Mahou (from Lausanne)
20	MF	CIV	Ousmane Doumbia (from Zürich)
34	DF	SUI	Allan Arigoni (from Grasshoppers)
—	FW	SUI	Boris Babic (from St. Gallen)

Out:

No.	Pos.	Nation	Player
5	DF	SUI	Mijat Marić (retired)
16	DF	SUI	Numa Lavanchy (to Sion)
20	MF	SUI	Olivier Custodio (to Lausanne)
21	DF	BRA	Yuri (free agent)
22	MF	SUI	Stefano Guidotti (to St. Gallen)
27	DF	SUI	Kevin Rüegg (loan return to (Italy) Hellas Verona)
24	MF	SVN	Sandi Lovrić (to (Italy) Udinese)
46	GK	SUI	Noam Baumann (free agent)
99	FW	SUI	Nikolas Muci (on loan to Wil)
—	FW	ITA	Carlo Manicone (to Chiasso, previously on loan)
—	FW	FRA	Kévin Monzialo (to (Austria) St. Pölten, previously on loan)
—	FW	NGA	Franklin Sasere (to (Liechtenstein) Vaduz, previously on loan at (Malta) Ħamrun Spartans)

=== St. Gallen ===
In:

No.	Pos.	Nation	Player
14	DF	CRO	Matej Maglica (from (Germany) Stuttgart II, previously on loan)
19	DF	MLI	Daouda Guindo (on loan from (Austria) Red Bull Salzburg, previously on loan at (Austria) Liefering)
22	FW	CIV	Emmanuel Latte Lath (on loan from (Italy) Atalanta, previously on loan at (Italy) SPAL)
27	MF	SUI	Randy Schneider (from Aarau)
34	MF	SUI	Stefano Guidotti (from Lugano)
35	GK	GER	Bela Dumrath (from Chur 97)
77	MF	COD	Chadrac Akolo (from (France) Amiens)

Out:

No.	Pos.	Nation	Player
11	FW	SUI	Kwadwo Duah (to (Germany) 1. FC Nürnberg)
15	DF	POR	Euclides Cabral (to (Cyprus) Apollon Limassol)
23	DF	KOS	Betim Fazliji (to (Germany) FC St. Pauli)
27	GK	SUI	Armin Abaz (to Winterthur)
28	FW	SUI	Christopher Lungoyi (loan return to (Italy) Juventus B)
34	FW	SUI	Boris Babic (to Lugano)
44	FW	SUI	Logan Clément (free agent)
45	MF	SUI	Alexandre Jankewitz (loan return to Young Boys)
50	DF	SUI	Nicolas Lüchinger (on loan to Thun)
55	MF	BFA	Salifou Diarrassouba (loan return to (Ivory Coast) ASEC Mimosas)
72	MF	SUI	Bastien Toma (loan return to (Belgium) Genk)
—	FW	FRA	Élie Youan (on loan to (Scotland) Hibernian, previously on loan at (Belgium) Mechelen)
—	DF	SUI	Miro Muheim (to (Germany) Hamburger SV, previously on loan)
—	MF	SUI	Tim Staubli (to Wil, previously on loan at (Liechtenstein) Vaduz)
—	FW	ALB	Florian Kamberi (to Winterthur, previously on loan at (England) Sheffield Wednesday)
—	FW	SUI	Lorenzo González (to (Spain) Ceuta, previously on loan at (Czech Republic) Ústí nad Labem)

=== Servette ===
In:

No.	Pos.	Nation	Player
7	FW	GER	Patrick Pflücke (from (Netherlands) Roda)
30	MF	SEN	Samba Lélé Diba (from (Senegal) Ndiambour)

Out:

No.	Pos.	Nation	Player
20	MF	GNB	Papu Mendes (free agent)
21	FW	SUI	Nils Pédat (free agent)
22	MF	SUI	Ricardo Azevedo (free agent)
23	DF	FRA	Vincent Sasso (to (Portugal) Boavista)

=== Sion ===
In:

No.	Pos.	Nation	Player
1	GK	AUT	Heinz Lindner (from Basel)
9	FW	FRA	Ilyas Chouaref (from (France) Châteauroux)
19	DF	SUI	Numa Lavanchy (from Lugano)
22	MF	FRA	Denis-Will Poha (from (Portugal) Vitória de Guimarães, previously on loan at (France) Pau)
27	FW	BFA	Abdel Zagré (from (Burkina Faso) Kadiogo)

Out:

No.	Pos.	Nation	Player
1	GK	COD	Timothy Fayulu (on loan to Winterthur)
4	DF	KOS	Arian Kabashi (free agent)
5	DF	SUI	Jan Bamert (free agent)
22	MF	GNB	Mauro Rodrigues (on loan to Yverdon)
25	FW	SUI	Théo Berdayes (on loan to Yverdon)
27	DF	SUI	Ivan Martić (to (Romania) Universitatea Craiova)
28	DF	SUI	Gaetano Berardi (to Bellinzona)
32	DF	SUI	Loris Benito (to Young Boys)
34	DF	SEN	Birama Ndoye (free agent)
77	DF	SUI	Sandro Theler (on loan to Yverdon)
99	FW	FRA	Guillaume Hoarau (free agent)
—	MF	FRA	Jean Ruiz (to (France) Pau, previously on loan at (France) Boulogne)

=== Grasshoppers ===
In:

No.	Pos.	Nation	Player
7	MF	GER	Tsiy-William Ndenge (from Luzern)
71	GK	SUI	Justin Hammel (from Lausanne-Ouchy)

Out:

No.	Pos.	Nation	Player
3	DF	ALB	Ermir Lenjani (to (Turkey) Ümraniyespor)
7	MF	SUI	Nuno da Silva (to Aarau)
34	DF	SUI	Allan Arigoni (to Lugano)
55	FW	SUI	Elmin Rastoder (on loan to (Liechtenstein) Vaduz)
—	MF	SUI	Fabio Fehr (to (Liechtenstein) Vaduz, previously on loan)
—	MF	KOS	Imran Bunjaku (to Aarau, previously on loan)
—	MF	MKD	Nikola Gjorgjev (to Aarau, previously on loan at Schaffhausen)

=== Luzern ===
In:

No.	Pos.	Nation	Player
18	MF	SUI	Nicky Beloko (from Neuchâtel Xamax)
19	FW	URU	Joaquín Ardaiz (from Schaffhausen)
20	DF	GER	Pius Dorn (from Thun)

Out:

No.	Pos.	Nation	Player
8	MF	GER	Tsiy-William Ndenge (to Grasshoppers)
15	MF	GER	Marvin Schulz (to (Germany) Holstein Kiel)
16	FW	GER	Varol Tasar (on loan to (Turkey) Giresunspor)
19	MF	SUI	Filip Ugrinic (to Young Boys)
34	DF	SUI	Silvan Sidler (to (Germany) Arminia Bielefeld)
—	DF	SUI	Ashvin Balaruban (to Neuchâtel Xamax, previously on loan at Kriens)
—	MF	SUI	David Mistrafović (to (Netherlands) Helmond Sport, previously on loan at Kriens)

=== Winterthur ===
In:

No.	Pos.	Nation	Player
1	GK	COD	Timothy Fayulu (on loan from Sion)
10	FW	SUI	Matteo Di Giusto (from (Liechtenstein) Vaduz)
17	FW	SUI	Samuel Ballet (from Young Boys, previously on loan)
22	FW	ALB	Florian Kamberi (from St. Gallen, previously on loan at (England) Sheffield Wednesday)
27	GK	SUI	Armin Abaz (from St. Gallen)
44	MF	SUI	Francisco Rodríguez (from Schaffhausen)

Out:

No.	Pos.	Nation	Player
1	GK	SUI	Raphael Spiegel (to Lausanne)
4	DF	GER	Gabriel Isik (to (Liechtenstein) Vaduz)
10	MF	SUI	Roberto Alves (to (Poland) Radomiak Radom)
18	GK	SUI	Gianluca Tolino (free agent)
20	DF	GER	Florian Baak (free agent)
22	FW	SUI	Tician Tushi (loan return to Basel)
24	MF	TUN	Sayfallah Ltaief (to Basel)
26	MF	SUI	Silvan Kriz (to (Austria) Dornbirn)
27	FW	SUI	Dimitri Volkart (to Rapperswil-Jona)
30	FW	KOS	Shkelqim Demhasaj (loan return to Grasshoppers)
33	DF	SUI	Noah Lovisa (free agent)

== See also ==
- 2022–23 Swiss Super League
