= 2022–23 FC Lugano season =

Lugano
2022–23 season
- Chairman: Philippe Regazzoni
- Manager: Mattia Croci-Torti
- Stadium: Cornaredo Stadium
- Swiss Super League: 3rd
- Swiss Cup: Runners-up
- UEFA Europa Conference League: Third qualifying round
- Top goalscorer: League: Žan Celar (16); All: Žan Celar (16)

The 2022–23 FC Lugano season was the club's 115th season in existence and the eighth consecutive season in the top flight of Swiss football. In addition to the domestic league, FC Lugano participated in this season's edition of the Swiss Cup and UEFA Europa Conference League. The season covers the period from 1 July 2022 to 30 June 2023.

== Players ==
=== First-team squad ===
As of 6 September 2022

Note: Flags indicate national team as defined under FIFA eligibility rules; some limited exceptions apply. Players may hold more than one non-FIFA nationality.

No.	Pos.	Nation	Player
1	GK	SUI	Amir Saipi
4	DF	KOS	Kreshnik Hajrizi
5	DF	SUI	Albian Hajdari (on loan from Juventus U23)
6	DF	ECU	Jhon Espinoza
7	DF	SUI	Mickaël Facchinetti
8	MF	SUI	Adrian Durrer
9	FW	SLO	Žan Celar
10	FW	SUI	Mattia Bottani
11	MF	SUI	Maren Haile-Selassie
13	GK	SUI	Serif Berbic
14	MF	URU	Jonathan Sabbatini (captain)
15	DF	GER	Lars Lukas Mai
17	DF	ARG	Milton Valenzuela
18	MF	FRA	Hicham Mahou
20	MF	CIV	Ousmane Doumbia

No.	Pos.	Nation	Player
22	MF	SUI	Renato Steffen
23	DF	BIH	Leonid Srdić
24	MF	NGR	Chinwendu Nkama
25	MF	SUI	Uran Bislimi
27	FW	SUI	Boris Babic
29	MF	TUN	Mohamed Belhadj Mahmoud
30	DF	SUI	Fabio Daprelà
31	FW	ARG	Ignacio Aliseda
34	DF	SUI	Allan Arigoni
41	DF	SUI	Noah De Queiroz
44	DF	ITA	Matteo Lape
45	MF	SUI	Michel De Jesus
47	FW	ALG	Mohamed El Amine Amoura
58	GK	NGR	Sebastian Osigwe
77	MF	CZE	Roman Macek

=== Other players under contract ===
Note: Flags indicate national team as defined under FIFA eligibility rules; some limited exceptions apply. Players may hold more than one non-FIFA nationality.

No.	Pos.	Nation	Player
—	MF	SLO	Abel Marc

=== Out on loan ===
Note: Flags indicate national team as defined under FIFA eligibility rules; some limited exceptions apply. Players may hold more than one non-FIFA nationality.

No.	Pos.	Nation	Player
—	GK	SUI	Alexander Muci (at Bellinzona until 30 June 2023)
—	FW	ITA	Alessandro Casciato (at Rapperswil-Jona until 31 December 2022)

No.	Pos.	Nation	Player
—	FW	SUI	Nikolas Muci (at Wil until 30 June 2024)

== Pre-season and friendlies ==
Win Draw Loss Fixtures

17 December 2022 Friendly	Lugano (Switzerland)	3–0	(Germany) SC Freiburg II	Lugano, Switzerland
13:00 CET (UTC+1)				Stadium: Cornaredo Stadium

21 December 2022 Friendly	Fiorentina (Italy)	6–1	(Switzerland) Lugano	Florence, Italy
18:00 CET (UTC+1)				Stadium: Stadio Artemio Franchi

7 January 2023 Friendly	Lugano (Switzerland)	2–7	(Germany) FC St. Pauli	Benidorm, Spain
14:00 CET (UTC+1)	Aliseda 42'; Arigoni 48'; Espinoza (yellow card); Hajrizi (yellow card)		Dźwigała 10', 52'; Daschner 11', 24'; Otto 20'; Eggestein 69'; Roggow 119'; Aremu (yellow card); Smith (yellow card)	Stadium: Melia Villaitana Football Center
Note: The game was played in two halves of 60 minutes each.

10 January 2023 Friendly	Piast Gliwice (Poland)	0–0	(Switzerland) Lugano	Benidorm, Spain
15:00 CET (UTC+1)				Stadium: Melia Villaitana Football Center

14 January 2023 Friendly	Lugano (Switzerland)	3–0	(Switzerland) Neuchâtel Xamax	Lugano, Switzerland
14:00 CET (UTC+1)				Stadium: Cornaredo Stadium

24 March 2023 Friendly	Como (Italy)	2–2	(Switzerland) Lugano	Como
11:00 CET (UTC+2)	Cerri 58'; Da Cunha 69'		Sabbatini 26', 34'	Stadium: Stadio Giuseppe Sinigaglia

== Competitions ==
=== Overview ===
Competition	First match	Last match	Starting round	Final position	Record							
Competition	First match	Last match	Starting round	Final position	Pld	W	D	L	GF	GA	GD	Win %
Swiss Super League	17 July 2022	29 May 2023	Matchday 1	3rd	36	15	12	9	59	47	+12	41.67
Swiss Cup	21 August 2022	4 June 2023	Round 1	Runners-up	6	4	1	1	17	6	+11	66.67
UEFA Europa Conference League	4 August 2022	11 August 2022	Third qualifying round	Third qualifying round	2	0	0	2	1	5	−4	0.00
Total					44	19	13	12	77	58	+19	43.18

Source: Soccerway

=== Swiss Super League ===
==== League table ====
Pos	Team	Pld	W	D	L	GF	GA	GD	Pts	Qualification or relegation
1	Young Boys (C)	36	21	11	4	82	30	+52	74	Qualification for the Champions League play-off round
2	Servette	36	14	16	6	53	48	+5	58	Qualification for the Champions League second qualifying round
3	Lugano	36	15	12	9	59	47	+12	57	Qualification for the Europa League play-off round
4	Luzern	36	13	11	12	56	52	+4	50	Qualification for the Europa Conference League second qualifying round
5	Basel	36	11	14	11	51	50	+1	47	Qualification for the Europa Conference League second qualifying round

Source: Swiss Super League
Rules for classification: 1) Points; 2) Goal difference; 3) Goals scored; 4) Head-to-head goal difference; 5) Away goals scored; 6) Draw.
(C) Champions

==== Results summary ====
Overall								Home						Away					
Pld	W	D	L	GF	GA	GD	Pts	W	D	L	GF	GA	GD	W	D	L	GF	GA	GD
36	15	12	9	48	44	+4	57	9	5	4	21	18	+3	6	7	5	27	26	+1

==== Results by round ====
Round	1	2	3	4	5	6	7	8	9	10	11	12	13	14	15	16	17	18	19	20	21	22	23	24	25	26	27	28	29	30	31	32	33	34	35	36
Ground	H	A	A	H	A	H	A	A	H	H	A	H	A	A	H	H	A	H	A	H	A	H	A	H	H	A	H	A	H	A	H	A	H	A	H	A
Result	L	L	W	L	W	L	W	L	W	W	D	L	L	D	W	W	W	D	L	D	D	D	D	W	D	L	D	D	W	W	W	D	W	D	W	W
Position	8	10	7	8	6	8	6	8	7	5	6	6	8	8	7	4	3	3	4	4	4	5	4	4	3	4	5	4	4	4	2	3	3	3	3	3

A = Away; H = Home; W = Win; D = Draw; L = Loss

==== Matches ====
The league fixtures were announced on 17 June 2022.

17 July 2022 1	Lugano	2–3	Sion	Cornaredo, Lugano
16;30	Sabbatini 61'; De Queiroz 88'	SFL summary	43' (o.g.) Daprelà; 59' Cavaré; 85' Schmied	Attendance: 2,737; Referee: (Switzerland) Fedayi San

24 July 2022 2	Grasshoppers	2–1	Lugano	Letzigrund, Zürich
16:30 CEST (UTC+2)	Kawabe 12', 47'; Dadashov (yellow card) 90+1'	Report	79' (pen.) Celar	Attendance: 4,123; Referee: (Switzerland) Stefan Horisberger; Assistant referees: (Switzerland) Fedayi San (VAR)

31 July 2022 3	Winterthur	1–4	Lugano	Stadion Schützenwiese, Winterthur
16:30	Buess 11'	SFL summary	20' Celar; 22' Haile-Selassie; 31' Bottani; 90+1' Celar	Attendance: 7,800; Referee: (Switzerland) Luca Cibelli

7 August 2022 4	Lugano	1–2	Luzern	Cornaredo, Lugano
16:30	Ziegler 75'	SFL summary	32' Dorn; 84' Beloko	Attendance: 3,060; Referee: (Switzerland) Alain Bieri

14 August 2022 5	Basel	0–2	Lugano	St. Jakob-Park, Basel
16:30	Xhaka (yellow card) 32'	SFL summary FCB report	(yellow card) 4' Arigoni; (yellow card) 42' Daprelà; (yellow card) 87' Valenzuela; 90+1' Babic; (yellow card) 90+2' Saipi; 90+4' Belhadj Mahmoud	Attendance: 19,888; Referee: (Switzerland) Alessandro Dudic

28 August 2022 6	Lugano	2–3	St. Gallen	Cornaredo, Lugano
14:15	Celar 6'; Belhadj Mahmoud (yellow card) 33'; Ziegler (yellow card) 57'; Babic 65'	SFL summary	(yellow card) 5' Sutter; 29' Guillemenot; 45+2' Witzig; 59' Görtler; (yellow card) 79' Guindo; (yellow card) 90+3' Vallci	Attendance: 3,357; Referee: (Switzerland) Stefan Horisberger

3 September 2022 7	Zürich	1–2	Lugano	Letzigrund, Zürich
20:30 CEST	Mets (yellow card) 9'; Tosin 24'; Avdijaj (yellow card) 26'; Rohner (yellow card) 60'; Selnæs (yellow card) 90'	SFL summary Report	Steffen 5'; Celar (yellow card) 19'; Amoura 90'	Attendance: 10,360; Referee: (Switzerland) Alessandro Dudic

11 September 2022 8	Young Boys	3–0	Lugano	Stadion Wankdorf, Bern
16:30 CEST	Nsame 2' 63'; Niasse (yellow card) 8'; Itten 41' (pen.); Camara (yellow card) 74'; Rieder (yellow card) 80'	SFL summary Report	Steffen (yellow card) 41'; Mahou (yellow card) 90+3'; Arigoni (yellow card) 90+4'	Attendance: 31,120; Referee: (Switzerland) Sven Wolfensberger

2 October 2022 9	Lugano	1–0	Servette	Stadio di Cornaredo, Lugano
16:30 CET	Sabbatini 35'; Daprelà (yellow card) 46'; Doumbia (yellow card) 70'	SFL summary Report	Valls (yellow card) 23'; Vouilloz (yellow card) 76'; Diallo (yellow card) 86'	Attendance: 3,340; Referee: (Switzerland) Alain Bieri

9 October 2022 10	Lugano	1–0	Basel	Cornaredo, Lugano
16:30	Sabbatini (yellow card) 24'; Mahou 33'; Valenzuela (yellow card) 84'	SFL summary FCB report	(yellow card) 61' Lang; (yellow card) 62' Amdouni	Attendance: 3,389; Referee: (Switzerland) Lukas Fähndrich

16 October 2022 11	St. Gallen	1–1	Lugano	Kybunpark, St. Gallen
14:15	Görtler (yellow card) 5'; Akolo 9'; Vallci (yellow card) 10'; Schmidt (yellow card) 36'	SFL summary	(yellow card) 45+1' Arigoni; (yellow card) 60' Saipi; 83' Celar; (yellow card) 90+4' Haile-Selassie	Attendance: 17,059; Referee: (Switzerland) Sven Wolfensberger

19 October 2022 12	Lugano	1–4	Young Boys	Stadio di Cornaredo, Lugano
20:30 CEST	Ziegler 25'; Celar (yellow card) 37'; Doumbia (yellow card) 64'; Daprelà (yellow card) 79'; Bislimi (yellow card) 86'	SFL summary Report	Nsame 21'; Rüegg (yellow card) 40'; Niasse (yellow card) 57'; Lustenberger (yellow card) 60'; Garcia 68'; Imeri 80'; Itten (yellow card) 90+1' (goal) 90+5'	Attendance: 3,307; Referee: (Switzerland) Sandro Schärer; Assistant referees: (Switzerland) Sven Wolfensberger (VAR)

22 October 2022 13	Luzern	3–1	Lugano	Swissporarena, Luzern
20:30	Burch (yellow card) 48'; Meyer 66' (pen.); Dräger 69'; Meyer 82'	SFL summary	(yellow card) 52' Arigoni; 61' Bislimi; (yellow card) 62' Bislimi; (yellow card) 74' Daprelà; (yellow card) 84' Valenzuela; (yellow card) 90+3' Mahou	Attendance: 10,037; Referee: (Switzerland) Nico Gianforte; Assistant referees: (Switzerland) Sandro Schärer (VAR)

29 October 2022 14	Servette	2–2	Lugano	Stade de Genève, Lancy
20:30 CET	Rouiller 3' (red card) 44'; Stevanović 26'; Diogo Monteiro (yellow card) 68'	SFL summary Report	Hajdari (yellow card) 23'; Celar 41'; Valenzuela (yellow card) 51' (yellow-red card) 87'; Sabbatini (yellow card) 61'; Doumbia 82'	Attendance: 5,842; Referee: (Switzerland) Lukas Fähndrich; Assistant referees: (Switzerland) Sascha Kever (VAR)

6 November 2022 15	Lugano	2–0	Zürich	Cornaredo, Lugano
16:30	Steffen 12'; Mai (yellow card) 24'; Hajdari (yellow card) 48'; Mahou (yellow card) 58' (yellow-red card) 78'; Babic (yellow card) 59'; Aliseda 71'; Saipi (yellow card) 88'	SFL summary	(yellow card) 28' Selnæs; (yellow card) 43' Marchesano; (yellow card) 47' Santini; (yellow card) 73' Brecher; (yellow card) 78' Katić; (yellow card) 88' Aliti	Attendance: 3,560; Referee: (Switzerland) Sven Wolfensberger; Assistant referees: (Switzerland) Lukas Fähndrich (VAR)

13 November 2022 16	Lugano	3–1	Winterthur	Cornaredo, Lugano
16:30	Celar 7'; Celar 15'; Arigoni (yellow card) 33'; Valenzuela (yellow card) 50'; Amoura (yellow card) 89' (goal) 89'	SFL summary	20' Di Giusto	Attendance: 3,140; Referee: (Switzerland) Luca Cibelli

22 January 2023 17	Sion	2–3	Lugano	Stade Tourbillon, Sion
14:15	Poha (yellow card) 14'; Cyprien 24'; Araz (yellow card) 39'; Cyprien (yellow card) 58'; Doumbia (76])	SFL summary	3' Amoura; 33' Steffen; (yellow card) 40' Hajdari; (yellow card) 90+1' Belhadj Mahmoud; 90+4' Celar	Attendance: 6,500; Referee: (Switzerland) Lukas Fähndrich

28 January 2023 18	Lugano	1–1	Grasshopper	Stadio Cornaredo, Lugano
18:00 CET (UTC+1)	Hajrizi (yellow card) 12'; Amoura (yellow card) 16'; Valenzuela (yellow card) 41'; Aliseda 88'	SFL summary	(yellow card) 20' Abrashi; 42' Kawabe; (yellow card) 58' Schmid	Attendance: 2,841; Referee: (Switzerland) Fedayi San (Gebenstorf); Assistant referees: (Switzerland) Lionel Tschudi (VAR); Man of the Match: Hayao Kawabe

4 February 2023 19	Winterthur	1–0	Lugano	Stadion Schützenwiese, Winterthur
16:30	Arnold (yellow card) 41'; Di Giusto 45'; Burkart (yellow card) 53'; Diaby (yellow card) 70'	SFL summary	(yellow card) 18' (yellow-red card) 90+5' Bottani; (yellow card) 38' Espinoza	Attendance: 7,500; Referee: (Switzerland) Nico Gianforte

12 February 2023 20	Lugano	1–1	Luzern	Cornaredo, Lugano
14:15	Celar 38' (pen.); Belhadj Mahmoud (yellow card) 44'; Hajdari (yellow card) 73'; Valenzuela (yellow card) 77'	SFL summary	16' Abubakar; (yellow card) 17' Schürpf; (yellow card) 31' Dräger; (yellow card) 36' Dorn; (yellow card) 90+3' Klidjé	Attendance: 3,026; Referee: (Switzerland) Anojen Kanagasingam

18 February 2023 21	Young Boys	1–1	Lugano	Stadion Wankdorf, Bern
20:30 CET	Zesiger (yellow card) 40'; Nsame 48'; Blum (yellow card) 75'	SFL summary Report	Sabatini (yellow card) 19'; Valenzuela 38'Steffen (yellow card) 45+2'	Attendance: 24,684; Referee: (Switzerland) Luca Cibelli

26 February 2023 22	Lugano	2–2	Basel	Cornaredo, Lugano
16:30	Celar 33'; Aliseda 38'; Hajrizi (yellow card) 90+2'; Hajdari (yellow card) 90+4'	SFL summary FCB report	(yellow card) 4' Vogel; (yellow card) 31' Xhaka; (yellow card) 42' Burger; 74' Males; 83' Lang; (yellow card) 90+3' Lang	Attendance: 3,205; Referee: (Switzerland) Sven Wolfensberger

5 March 2023 23	Sion	1–1	Lugano	Stade Tourbillon, Sion
16:30	Poha (yellow card); Sio 66'; Chouaref (yellow card) 81'	SFL summary	34' Doumbia; (yellow card) 44' Steffen; (yellow card) 50' Hajrizi; (yellow card) 70' Valenzuela	Attendance: 4,800; Referee: (Switzerland) Urs Schnyder

11 March 2023 24	Lugano	2–0	Zürich	Cornaredo, Lugano
20:30	Aliseda 22'; Steffen (yellow card) 39'; Sabbatini 45'; Hajdari (yellow card) 70'; Doumbia (yellow card) 79'; Babic (yellow card) 83'; Bislimi (yellow card) 90+4'	SFL summary	(yellow card) 5' Tosin; (yellow card) 36' Šimić; (yellow card) 90+4' Omeragić	Attendance: 4,700; Referee: (Switzerland) Esther Staubli

19 March 2023 25	Lugano	1–1	Servette	Cornaredo, Lugano
16:30	Hajrizi (yellow card) 9'; Macek (yellow card) 60'; Arigoni (yellow card) 71'; Celar 90'	SFL summary	(yellow card) 21' Antunes; (yellow card) 45+1' Céspedes; (yellow card) 58' Bedia; 74' Valls	Attendance: 2,814; Referee: (Switzerland) Mirel Turkes; Assistant referees: (VAR) (Switzerland) Fedayi San

2 April 2023 26	Grasshopper	2–1	Lugano	Letzigrund, Zürich
14:15 CEST (UTC+2)	Schmid (yellow card) 37'; Shabani 41' (yellow card) 56'; Pusic 67'; Dadashov (yellow card) 76'	Report	30' Celar; (yellow card) 90+3' Arigoni; (yellow card) 90+7' Daprelà	Attendance: 4,502; Referee: (Switzerland) Stefan Horisberger; Assistant referees: (VAR) (Switzerland) Urs Schnyder

10 April 2023 27	Lugano	1–1	St. Gallen	Cornaredo, Lugano
14:15	Hajdari (yellow card) 13'; Steffen 22'; Steffen (yellow card) 63'; Facchinetti (yellow card) 90+4'	SFL summary	(yellow card) 61' Görtler; (yellow card) 85' Vallci; (yellow card) 90+3' Quintillà; 90+5' (pen.) Akolo	Attendance: 4,882; Referee: (Switzerland) Stefan Horisberger; Assistant referees: (VAR) (Switzerland) Stephan Klossner

15 April 2023 28	Servette	0–0	Lugano	Stade de Genève, Geneva
18:00		SFL summary	(yellow card) 42' Hajrizi; (yellow card) 90+2' Macek	Attendance: 4,141; Referee: (Switzerland) Urs Schnyder; Assistant referees: (VAR) (Switzerland) Stefan Horisberger

23 April 2023 29	Lugano	2–0	Sion	Cornaredo, Lugano
16:30	Steffen (yellow card) 9'; Belhadj Mahmoud (yellow card) 73' (yellow-red card) 78'; Valenzuela 90'; Amoura 90+4'	SFL summary	(yellow card) 21' Schmied; (yellow card) 38' Cyprien; (yellow card) 49' (yellow-red card) 51' Zagré; (yellow card) 72' (yellow-red card) 90+3' Diouf; (yellow card) 89' Batata	Attendance: 3,005; Referee: (Switzerland) Esther Staubli; Assistant referees: (VAR) (Switzerland) Sandro Schärer

26 April 2023 30	St. Gallen	1–2	Lugano	Kybunpark, St. Gallen
20:30	Witzig 19'; Guillemenot (yellow card) 36'; Schmidt (yellow card) 61'; Maglica (yellow card) 66'; Ati-Zigi (yellow card) 67'	SFL summary	(yellow card) 15' Arigoni; 57' Amoura; 86' Bislimi	Attendance: 12,622; Referee: (Switzerland) Luca Cibelli; Assistant referees: (VAR) (Switzerland) Sascha Kever

29 April 2023 31	Lugano	5–1	Grasshopper	Stadio Cornaredo, Lugano
20:30 CEST (UTC+2)	Aliseda 25', 78'; Sabbatini (yellow card) 28'; Steffen (yellow card) 38'; Macek (yellow card) 56'; Amoura 59', 64'; Celar 70'	SFL summary	(yellow card) 10' Seko; 45+3' Demhasaj; (yellow card) 58' Herc	Attendance: 3,627; Referee: (Switzerland) Stefan Horisberger; Assistant referees: (VAR) (Switzerland) Stephan Klossner

7 May 2023 32	Luzern	2–2	Lugano	Swissporarena, Luzern
14:15	Beka 27'; Meyer 36'; Villiger (yellow card) 60'; Beka (yellow card) 82'; Abubakar (yellow card) 84'	SFL summary	(yellow card) 23' Hajrizi; (yellow card) 31' Doumbia; 52' Celar; 74' Steffen; (yellow card) 78' Valenzuela; (yellow card) 90+2' Steffen	Attendance: 14,358; Referee: (Switzerland) Sven Wolfensberger; Assistant referees: (VAR) (Switzerland) Sascha Kever

14 May 2023 33	Lugano	2–1	Winterthur	Cornaredo, Lugano
16:30	Aliseda 15'; Arigoni 21'	SFL summary	Ardaiz 16'	Referee: (Switzerland) Esther Staubli; Assistant referees: (VAR) (Switzerland) Sven Wolfensberger

21 May 2023 34	Basel	1–1	Lugano	St. Jakob-Park, Basel
16:30	Zeqiri 35'; Zeqiri (yellow card) 38'; Males (yellow card) 62'; Calafiori (yellow card) 63' (yellow-red card) 90+4'; Frei (yellow card) 90+4'; Heiko Vogel (coach) (yellow card) (yellow-red card) after match'	FCB resport SFL summary	(yellow card) 19' Hajrizi; 84' Steffen; (yellow card) 89' Steffen; (yellow card) 89' Mahou; (yellow card) 90+4' Saipi	Attendance: 21,105; Referee: (Switzerland) Lukas Fähndrich; Assistant referees: (VAR) (Switzerland) Stefan Horisberger

=== Swiss Cup ===
21 August 2022 First round	Linth	1–5	Lugano	Näfels
15:00 CEST (UTC+2)	A. Sabanovic 88'	Report	Arigoni 23', 44'; Mahou 73'; Haile-Selassie 79', 80'	Stadium: SGU-Platz Nord

18 September 2022 Second round	Breitenrain	0–4	Lugano	Bern
15:00 CEST (UTC+2)		Report	Babic 47'; Aliseda 70', 90'; Amoura 87'	Stadium: Spitalacker; Referee: Anojen Kanagasingam

9 November 2022 Third round	Lugano	1–0	Winterthur	Lugano
20:30 CET (UTC+1)	Bottani 67'	Report		Stadium: Cornaredo Stadium; Referee: Stefan Horisberger

1 March 2023 Quarter-finals	Sion	0–3	Lugano	Sion
20:15 CET (UTC+1)		Report	Amoura 62'; Aliseda 72' (pen.); Sabbatini 81'	Stadium: Stade de Tourbillon; Referee: Sandro Schärer

5 April 2023 Semi-finals	Servette	2–2 (a.e.t.) (3–5 p)	Lugano	Lancy
20:15 CEST (UTC+2)	Kutesa 22'; Crivelli 90+6'	Report	Aliseda 31', 40'	Stadium: Stade de Genève; Referee: Fedayi San
	Penalties
	Stevanovic (penalty scored); Pflücke (penalty scored); Crivelli (penalty scored); Mbabu (penalty missed)		(penalty scored) Celar; (penalty scored) Bottani; (penalty scored) Amoura; (penalty scored) Macek; (penalty scored) Sabbatini
Note: Lugano won 5–3 on penalties.

4 June 2023 Final	Young Boys	3–2	Lugano	Bern
14:00 CEST (UTC+2)	Ugrinic (yellow card) 15'; Nsame 20', 45+3', (yellow card) 72'; Blum (yellow card) 29'; Zesiger (yellow card) 33'; Fassnacht (yellow card) 62'; Elia 85'	Report	Belhadj Mahmoud (yellow card) 27'; Bislimi (yellow card) 36'; Bottani 53'; Doumbia (yellow card) 63'; Steffen 87'	Stadium: Stadion Wankdorf; Attendance: 31,500; Referee: Lukas Fähndrich

=== UEFA Europa Conference League ===
==== Third qualifying round ====
4 August 2022 First leg	Lugano (Switzerland)	0–2	(Israel) Hapoel Be'er Sheva	Lugano, Switzerland
20:00 CEST (UTC+2)	Bottani (yellow card) 8'; Arigoni (yellow card) 35'	Report	Yosefi (yellow card) 37', (goal) 39'; Micha (yellow card) 76'; Selmani 85'	Stadium: Cornaredo Stadium; Attendance: 3,369; Referee: Michael Fabbri (Italy)

11 August 2022 Second leg	Hapoel Be'er Sheva (Israel)	3–1 (5–1 agg.)	(Switzerland) Lugano	Netanya, Israel (Note: Hapoel Be’er Sheva played their home match at the Netanya Stadium, instead of their regular stadium, Turner Stadium, Be’er Sheva, due to safety concerns relating to the 2022 Israel–Gaza conflict.)
20:15 IDT (UTC+3)	Bareiro (yellow card) 18'; Vítor 51'; Hajdari 61' (o.g.); Hatuel (yellow card) 80', (goal) 85'; Elhamed (yellow card) 90+2'	Report	Belhadj Mahmoud (yellow card) 21'; Arigoni (yellow card) 25'; Sabbatini (penalty missed) 42'; Maccoppi (yellow card) 65'; Doumbia 73' (pen.); Hajdari (yellow card) 90+2'	Stadium: Netanya Stadium; Attendance: 4,798; Referee: Juan Martínez Munuera (Spain)
Note: Hapoel Be'er Sheva won 5–1 on aggregate.
