= 2020–21 FC St. Gallen season =

FC St. Gallen
2020–21 season
- Chairman: Matthias Hüppi
- Head coach: Peter Zeidler
- Stadium: Kybunpark
- Swiss Super League: 7th
- Swiss Cup: Runners-up
- UEFA Europa League: Third qualifying round
- Top goalscorer: League: Kwadwo Duah (9); All: Kwadwo Duah (10)
| Home colours | Away colours |

The 2020–21 season was FC St. Gallen's 142nd season in existence and the club's ninth consecutive season in the top flight of Swiss football. In addition to the domestic league, St. Gallen participated in this season's editions of the Swiss Cup. The season covered the period from August 2020 to 30 June 2021.

== Players ==
=== First-team squad ===
As of 1 February 2021

| No. | Pos. | Nation | Player |
|---|---|---|---|
| 1 | GK | GHA | Lawrence Ati-Zigi |
| 3 | DF | GHA | Musah Nuhu |
| 4 | DF | SUI | Leonidas Stergiou |
| 6 | MF | SUI | Basil Stillhart |
| 7 | FW | AUT | Chukwubuike Adamu (on loan from Red Bull Salzburg) |
| 8 | MF | ESP | Jordi Quintillà |
| 9 | FW | SUI | Jérémy Guillemenot |
| 10 | MF | ESP | Víctor Ruiz |
| 15 | DF | POR | Euclides Cabral |
| 16 | MF | GER | Lukas Görtler |
| 18 | GK | GER | Lukas Watkowiak |
| 19 | FW | SUI | Lorenzo González |
| 20 | FW | FRA | Élie Youan (on loan from Nantes) |
| 21 | MF | SUI | Miro Muheim |
| 22 | DF | SUI | Adonis Ajeti |

| No. | Pos. | Nation | Player |
|---|---|---|---|
| 23 | DF | KOS | Betim Fazliji |
| 24 | MF | SUI | Kwadwo Duah |
| 25 | FW | SEN | Boubacar Traorè |
| 26 | MF | SUI | Tim Staubli |
| 27 | MF | SUI | Fabio Solimando |
| 29 | MF | SUI | Alessandro Kräuchi |
| 34 | FW | SUI | Boris Babic |
| 40 | GK | SUI | Nico Strübi |
| 50 | DF | SUI | Nicolas Lüchinger |
| 52 | FW | SUI | Angelo Campos |
| 53 | GK | SUI | Armin Abaz |
| 55 | MF | BFA | Salifou Diarrassouba (on loan from ASEC Mimosas) |
| 77 | MF | FRA | Nsana Simon |
| 98 | DF | FRA | Yannis Letard |

=== Out on loan ===
Note: Flags indicate national team as defined under FIFA eligibility rules; some limited exceptions apply. Players may hold more than one non-FIFA nationality.

| No. | Pos. | Nation | Player |
|---|---|---|---|
| — | FW | SUI | Patrick Sutter (at SC Brühl until 30 June 2020) |
| — | DF | SUI | Silvan Gönitzer (at FC Schaffhausen until 30 June 2020) |
| 7 | FW | ALB | Florian Kamberi (at Aberdeen until 30 June 2021) |

== Pre-season and friendlies ==
Win Draw Loss

| 21 August 2020 Friendly | St. Gallen (Switzerland) | 5–0 | Austria Lustenau | St. Margrethen |
| 18:30 CEST (UTC+2) | | Report | | Stadium: Sportanlage Rheinau |

| 29 August 2020 Friendly | St. Gallen (Switzerland) | 3–1 | (Germany) SC Freiburg | St. Gallen, Switzerland |
| 14:30 CEST (UTC+2) | | Report | | Stadium: Kybunpark |

| 5 September 2020 Friendly | 1. FC Heidenheim (Germany) | 6–2 | (Switzerland) St. Gallen | Heidenheim an der Brenz, Germany |
| 15:00 CEST (UTC+2) | | Report | | Stadium: Voith-Arena |

| 12 September 2020 Friendly | St. Gallen (Switzerland) | 0–1 | (Germany) Türkgücü München | St. Gallen, Switzerland |
| 14:30 CEST (UTC+2) | | Report | | Stadium: Kybunpark |

| 8 October 2020 Friendly | Dornbirn (Austria) | 1–1 | (Switzerland) St. Gallen | Dornbirn, Austria |
| 19:00 CET | | Report | | Stadium: Stadion Birkenwiese |

| 9 January 2021 Friendly | Wil (Switzerland) | 1–4 | (Switzerland) St. Gallen | Wil, Switzerland |
| 15:00 CET | | Report | | Stadium: Sportpark Bergholz |

| 16 January 2021 Friendly | St. Gallen (Switzerland) | 2–0 | (Austria) Rheindorf Altach | St. Gallen, Switzerland |
| 15:00 CET | | Report | | Stadium: Kybunpark |

== Competitions ==
=== Overview ===
| Competition | First match | Last match | Starting round | Final position | Record | | | | | | | |
| Competition | First match | Last match | Starting round | Final position | Pld | W | D | L | GF | GA | GD | Win % |
|---|---|---|---|---|---|---|---|---|---|---|---|---|
| Swiss Super League | 20 September 2020 | 21 May 2021 | Matchday 1 | 7th | 36 | 11 | 11 | 14 | 45 | 48 | −3 | 30.56 |
| Swiss Cup | 8 April 2021 | 24 May 2021 | Round 3 | Runners-up | 4 | 3 | 0 | 1 | 8 | 5 | +3 | 75.00 |
| Europa League | 24 September 2020 | | Third qualifying round | Third qualifying round | 1 | 0 | 0 | 1 | 0 | 1 | −1 | 0.00 |
| Total | | | | | 41 | 14 | 11 | 16 | 53 | 54 | −1 | 34.15 |

Source: Soccerway

=== Swiss Super League ===
==== League table ====
| Pos | Team | Pld | W | D | L | GF | GA | GD | Pts | Qualification or relegation |
|---|---|---|---|---|---|---|---|---|---|---|
| 5 | Luzern | 36 | 12 | 10 | 14 | 62 | 59 | +3 | 46 | Qualification for the Europa Conference League third qualifying round (Note: Luzern qualified for the Europa Conference League third qualifying round as winners of the 2020–21 Swiss Cup.) |
| 6 | Lausanne-Sport | 36 | 12 | 10 | 14 | 52 | 55 | −3 | 46 | |
| 7 | St. Gallen | 36 | 11 | 11 | 14 | 45 | 48 | −3 | 44 | |
| 8 | Zürich | 36 | 11 | 10 | 15 | 53 | 57 | −4 | 43 | |
| 9 | Sion (O) | 36 | 8 | 14 | 14 | 48 | 58 | −10 | 38 | Qualification for the relegation play-offs |

Source: Swiss Super League
Rules for classification: 1) Points; 2) Goal difference; 3) Goals scored; 4) Head-to-head goal difference; 5) Away goals scored; 6) Draw.
(O) Play-off winners

==== Results summary ====
| Overall | | | | | | | | Home | | | | | | Away | | | | | |
| Pld | W | D | L | GF | GA | GD | Pts | W | D | L | GF | GA | GD | W | D | L | GF | GA | GD |
|---|---|---|---|---|---|---|---|---|---|---|---|---|---|---|---|---|---|---|---|
| 22 | 8 | 7 | 7 | 27 | 25 | +2 | 31 | 5 | 2 | 4 | 15 | 13 | +2 | 3 | 5 | 3 | 12 | 12 | 0 |

Last updated: 27 February 2021.
Source: Soccerway

==== Results by round ====
| Round | 1 | 2 | 3 | 4 | 5 | 6 | 7 | 8 | 9 | 10 | 11 | 12 | 13 | 14 | 15 | 16 | 17 | 18 | 19 | 20 | 21 | 22 | 23 | 24 | 25 | 26 | 27 | 28 | 29 | 30 | 31 | 32 | 33 | 34 | 35 | 36 |
|---|---|---|---|---|---|---|---|---|---|---|---|---|---|---|---|---|---|---|---|---|---|---|---|---|---|---|---|---|---|---|---|---|---|---|---|---|
| Ground | H | A | H | A | A | H | A | H | A | H | A | H | A | H | A | H | H | A | H | A | A | H | H | A | H | A | H | A | H | A | H | A | H | A | H | A |
| Result | W | W | W | D | L | L | D | D | W | W | W | D | D | L | D | W | L | L | L | D | L | W | L | L | D | L | D | L | D | L | W | L | L | D | W | W |
| Position | 3 | 3 | 3 | 3 | 3 | 3 | 3 | 3 | 3 | 3 | 3 | 3 | 3 | 3 | 3 | 3 | 3 | 3 | 3 | 3 | 3 | 3 | | | | | | | | | | | | | | |

Source: Soccerway
A = Away; H = Home; W = Win; D = Draw; L = Loss

==== Matches ====
| 20 September 2020 1 | St. Gallen | 1–0 | Sion | St. Gallen |
| 16:00 CET | Ati-Zigi (yellow card) 26'; Fazliji 38' | Report | Abdellaoui (yellow card) 18' (red card) 57'; Martić (yellow card) 45+2' | Stadium: Kybunpark; Attendance: 1,000; Referee: Adrien Jaccottet |

| 27 September 2020 2 | Vaduz | 0–1 | St. Gallen | Vaduz |
| 16:00 CET | Simani (yellow card) 26'; Prokopič (yellow card) 34'; Schmid (yellow card) 90+3' | Report | Rüfli (yellow card) 71'; André Ribeiro 83' | Stadium: Rheinpark Stadion; Attendance: 1,000; Referee: Lukas Fähndrich |

| 4 October 2020 3 | St. Gallen | 1–0 | Servette | St. Gallen |
| 16:00 CET | Görtler (yellow card) 4'; Duah 24'; Fazliji (yellow card) 25'; Stillhart (yellow card) 42'; Ati-Zigi (yellow card) 90+3' | Report | Sauthier (yellow card) 36'; Sasso (yellow card) 44'; Mendy (yellow card) 45'; Stevanović (yellow card) 59'; Frick (yellow card) 61' | Stadium: Kybunpark; Attendance: 9,244; Referee: Urs Schnyder |

| 18 October 2020 4 | Luzern | 2–2 | St. Gallen | Lucerne |
| 16:00 CET | Ndenge (yellow card) 27'; Tasar (yellow card) 45+3'; Sorgić 51'; Ugrinic 66' | Report | Víctor Ruiz 5'; Jordi Quintillà 59' (yellow card) 61'; Kräuchi (yellow card) 79' | Stadium: Swissporarena; Attendance: 3,569; Referee: Fedayi San |

| 24 October 2020 5 | Lugano | 1–0 | St. Gallen | Lugano |
| 19:00 CET | Lavanchy 16' (yellow card) 60'; Adrià Guerrero (yellow card) 37'; Gerndt (yellow card) 53'; Guidotti (yellow card) 73' | Report | Kräuchi (yellow card) 27'; Guillemenot (yellow card) 34'; Jordi Quintillà (yellow card) 75'; André Ribeiro (yellow card) 88' | Stadium: Stadio di Cornaredo; Attendance: 1,380; Referee: Urs Schnyder |

| 1 November 2020 6 | St. Gallen | 1–3 | Basel | St. Gallen |
| 16:00 CET | Duah 13'; Jordi Quintillà (yellow card) 35'; Stillhart (yellow card) 63' | Report | Arthur Cabral 6' (yellow card) 19'; Frei 39'; Kasami 70' | Stadium: Kybunpark; Attendance: 0 Referee: Lukas Fähndrich |

| 8 November 2020 7 | Young Boys | 0–0 | St. Gallen | Bern |
| 16:00 CET | Aebischer (yellow card) 45' | Report | Fazliji (yellow card) 20'; Stillhart (yellow card) 76'; Stergiou (yellow card) 79'; Youan (yellow card) 81' | Stadium: Stadion Wankdorf; Attendance: 0 Referee: Urs Schnyder |

| 22 November 2020 8 | St. Gallen | 2–2 | Lausanne-Sport | St. Gallen |
| 16:00 CET | Babic 62'; Duah 88' | Report | Boranijašević (yellow card) 22'; Puertas (yellow card) 22'; Flo 32'; Zekhnini 45'; Schneuwly (yellow card) 57' | Stadium: Kybunpark; Attendance: 0 Referee: Luca Piccolo |

| 9 December 2020 9 | Zürich | 1–2 | St. Gallen | Zürich |
| 18:15 CET | Aliti (yellow card) 4'; Tosin 28' (yellow card) 62'; Nathan (yellow card) 56'; Kololli (yellow card) 74'; Doumbia (yellow card) 74' | Report | Youan 9' 37'; Görtler (yellow card) 52'; Rüfli (yellow card) 83' | Stadium: Stadion Letzigrund; Attendance: 0 Referee: Alessandro Dudic |

| 20 January 2021 10 | St. Gallen | 2–0 | Vaduz | St. Gallen |
| 18:00 CET | Duah 62'; Stillhart 70' (yellow card) 83' | Report | Sutter (yellow card) 26' | Stadium: Kybunpark; Attendance: 0 Referee: Alain Bieri |

| 13 December 2020 11 | Lausanne-Sport | 0–1 | St. Gallen | Lausanne |
| 16:00 CET | Geissmann (yellow card) 14'; Zekhnini (yellow card) 40'; Zohouri (yellow card) 76' | Report | Víctor Ruiz 61' | Stadium: Stade de la Tuilière; Attendance: 0 Referee: Luca Piccolo |

| 16 December 2020 12 | St. Gallen | 0–0 | Lugano | St. Gallen |
| 20:30 CET | Fazliji (yellow card) 67'; Görtler (yellow card) 83' | Report | Marić (yellow card) 73'; Monzialo (yellow card) 89' | Stadium: Kybunpark; Attendance: 0 Referee: Urs Schnyder |

| 19 December 2020 13 | Basel | 0–0 | St. Gallen | Basel |
| 20:30 CET | Marchand (yellow card) 60' | Report | Babic (yellow card) 36' | Stadium: St. Jakob-Park; Attendance: 0 Referee: Fedayi San |

| 22 December 2020 14 | St. Gallen | 1–2 | Young Boys | St. Gallen |
| 20:30 CET | Letard (yellow card) 21'; Staubli 83'; Rüfli (yellow card) 89' | Report | Siebatcheu (yellow card) 62' (goal) 68' 72'; Aebischer (yellow card) 86' | Stadium: Kybunpark; Attendance: 0 Referee: Léonce Lionel Tschudi |

| 10 February 2021 15 | Servette | 2–2 | St. Gallen | Geneva |
| 18:15 CET | Rouiller (yellow card) 11'; Kyei 20'; Fazliji 60' (o.g.) | Report | Stillhart 7'; Guillemenot 48' | Stadium: Stade de Genève; Attendance: 0 Referee: Urs Schnyder |

| 17 February 2021 16 | St. Gallen | 2–1 | Luzern | St. Gallen |
| 18:15 CET | Traorè (yellow card) 19'; Víctor Ruiz 58' (pen.); Duah 72'; Görtler (yellow card) 86' | Report | Sorgić 14'; Frýdek (red card) 56'; Schaub (yellow card) 61'; Schwegler (yellow card) 70' | Stadium: Kybunpark; Attendance: 0 Referee: Stefan Horisberger |

| 30 January 2021 17 | St. Gallen | 2–3 | Zürich | St. Gallen |
| 20:30 CET | Duah 2'; Stillhart 10'; Jordi Quintillà (yellow card) 45+3'; Stergiou (yellow card) 66'; Staubli (yellow card) 90+4' | Report | Marchesano 16' (pen.) 38'; Ceesay (yellow card) 28'; Winter (yellow card) 40'; Khelifi 45+2' | Stadium: Kybunpark; Attendance: 0 Referee: Lukas Fähndrich |

| 3 February 2021 18 | Sion | 3–2 | St. Gallen | Sion |
| 20:30 CET | Grgić 14' (yellow card) 32' (goal) 61' (pen.) 90+6'; Abdellaoui (yellow card) 20' | Report | Guillemenot 4'; Traorè (yellow card) 25'; Lacroix 75' (o.g.) | Stadium: Stade de Tourbillon; Attendance: 0 Referee: Adrien Jaccottet |

| 24 January 2021 19 | St. Gallen | 0–1 | Lugano | St. Gallen |
| 16:00 CET | Traorè (yellow card) 12' (yellow-red card) 72' | Report | Asumah Abubakar (yellow card) 33'; Kecskés (yellow card) 49'; Marić 85' (pen.) | Stadium: Kybunpark; Attendance: 0 Referee: Fedayi San |

| 13 February 2021 20 | Sion | 1–1 | St. Gallen | Sion |
| 20:30 CET | Grgić 4' (pen.); Uldriķis (yellow card) 57' | Report | Nuhu (yellow card) 3'; Jordi Quintillà (yellow card) 15'; Guillemenot 51' | Stadium: Stade de Tourbillon; Attendance: 0 Referee: Luca Piccolo |

| 20 February 2021 21 | Vaduz | 2–1 | St. Gallen | Vaduz |
| | | | | Stadium: Rheinpark Stadion |

| 27 February 2021 22 | St. Gallen | 3–1 | Basel | St. Gallen |
| | | | | Stadium: Kybunpark; Attendance: 0 |

| 3 March 2021 23 | St. Gallen | 0–1 | Servette | St. Gallen |
| | | | | Stadium: Kybunpark; Attendance: 0 |

| 7 March 2021 24 | Luzern | 4–2 | St. Gallen | Lucerne |
| | | | | Stadium: Swissporarena |

| 14 March 2021 25 | St. Gallen | 2–2 | Young Boys | St. Gallen |
| 16:00 CET (UTC+1) | Fazliji (yellow card) 4'; Youan 9'; Ruiz (yellow card) 35', (goal) 74' (pen.); Görtler (yellow card) 63' | Report | Zesiger (yellow card) 29'; Nsame (yellow card) 31', (goal) 62' (pen.); Sierro (yellow card) 63'; Mambimbi (yellow card) 67'; Elia 82', (yellow card) 86' | Stadium: Kybunpark; Referee: Urs Schnyder |

| 20 March 2021 26 | Lausanne-Sport | 4–3 | St. Gallen | Lausanne |
| | | | | Stadium: Stade de la Tuilière; Attendance: 0 |

| 3 April 2021 27 | St. Gallen | 1–1 | Zürich | St. Gallen |
| | | | | Stadium: Kybunpark; Attendance: 0 |

| 11 April 2021 28 | Young Boys | 2–0 | St. Gallen | Bern |
| 16:00 CEST (UTC+2) | Siebatcheu (yellow card) 21'; Lustenberger (yellow card) 23'; Martins 62'; Nsame 83' | Report | Muheim (yellow card) 40'; Youan (yellow card) 44'; Cabral (yellow card) 63' | Stadium: Stadion Wankdorf; Referee: Adrien Jaccottet |

| 17 April 2021 29 | St. Gallen | 0–0 | Luzern | St. Gallen |
| | | | | Stadium: Kybunpark; Attendance: 0 |

| 21 April 2021 30 | Lugano | 2–0 | St. Gallen | Lugano |
| | | | | Stadium: Stadio di Cornaredo |

| 24 April 2021 31 | St. Gallen | 1–0 | Vaduz | Kybunpark, St. Gallen |
| 18:15 | Adamu 26'; Duah (yellow card) 30'; Stillhart (yellow card) 39' | Summary SVF | (yellow card) 52' Schmied; (yellow card) 76' Simani | Attendance: 100; Referee: (Switzerland) Nikolaj Hänni |

| 1 May 2021 32 | Basel | 1–0 | St. Gallen | Basel |
| | | | | Stadium: St. Jakob-Park; Attendance: 0 |

| 9 May 2021 33 | St. Gallen | 0–3 | Sion | St. Gallen |
| | | | | Stadium: Kybunpark; Attendance: 0 |

| 12 May 2021 34 | Zürich | 2–2 | St. Gallen | Zürich |
| | | | | Stadium: Stadion Letzigrund; Attendance: 0 |

| 15 May 2021 35 | St. Gallen | 5–0 | Lausanne-Sport | St. Gallen |
| | | | | Stadium: Kybunpark; Attendance: 0 |

| 21 May 2021 36 | Servette | 1–2 | St. Gallen | Geneva |
| 20:30 | | Report | | Stadium: Stade de Genève; Attendance: 0 Referee: Stefan Horisberger |

=== UEFA Europa League ===
| 24 September 2020 Third qualifying round | St. Gallen (Switzerland) | 0–1 | (Greece) AEK Athens | St. Gallen |
| 20:30 CET | Muheim (yellow card) 31'; Görtler (yellow card) 51' (yellow-red card) 90+5'; Fazliji (yellow card) 80' | Report | Livaja (yellow card) 35'; Mantalos (yellow card) 45+1'; Krstičić (yellow card) 50'; Nélson Oliveira 72' | Stadium: Kybunpark; Attendance: 0 Referee: Alejandro Hernández Hernández |
