= Osigwe =

Osigwe is a surname. Notable people with the surname include:

- Peace Anyiam-Osigwe (1969–2023), Nigerian filmmaker
- Sebastian Osigwe (born 1994), Nigerian footballer
