= Cyrano, el musical =

Cyrano, el musical is a 2003 Mexican musical based on the 1897 play Cyrano de Bergerac by Edmond Rostand. The book and lyrics are by Lorenzo Gonzalez. The music is by David Tort. It was the first Mexican musical written in verse, based upon the Spanish translation from the French.

== Performances ==
The musical was produced by and starred Victor Civeira. It was directed by Lorenzo Gonzalez. It ran for a year and closed after 120 performances. Its run was at three different theaters: Sergio Magaña, Benito Juarez and finally Fernando Soler. After this it had a tour through different states and one small run by a professional company led by Mauricio Cedeño in Guadalajara.

== Awards and nominations ==
Winner of Mexican Best Musical (ACPT, APT), Best Leading Actor in a musical Victor Civeira (ACPT), Best New Actress in a Musical Tzaitel Santini (ACPT, APT), Best New Actor in a Musical Gustavo Millet (APT), Best Musical Score Lorenzo Gonzalez, David Tort (APT, ACPT), with nominations for Best Director in a Musoal Lorenzo Gonzalez (APT, ACPT), Best Leading Actor in a Musical Victor Civeira (APT), Best New Actor in a Musical Gustavo Millet (ACPT).
