= Žan Celar =

Slovenian footballer (born 1999)

Personal information
- Date of birth: 14 March 1999 (age 27)
- Place of birth: Kranj, Slovenia
- Height: 1.86 m (6 ft 1 in)
- Position: Forward

Team information
- Current team: Basel
- Number: 9

Youth career
- –2012: Šenčur
- 2013–2014: Triglav Kranj
- 2014–2017: Maribor
- 2017–2019: Roma Primavera

Senior career*
Years	Team	Apps	(Gls)
2016–2017	Maribor	1	(0)
2018–2021	Roma	1	(0)
2019–2020	→ Cittadella (loan)	10	(1)
2020–2021	→ Cremonese (loan)	38	(4)
2021–2024	Lugano	95	(40)
2024–2026	Queens Park Rangers	21	(2)
2025–2026	→ Fortuna Düsseldorf (loan)	16	(0)
2026–	Basel	13	(8)

International career^{‡}
2014	Slovenia U16	4	(1)
2015–2016	Slovenia U17	16	(6)
2016–2017	Slovenia U18	11	(4)
2017	Slovenia U19	5	(5)
2019–2021	Slovenia U21	10	(1)
2021–	Slovenia	21	(0)
- * Club domestic league appearances and goals as of 20 November 2026 ‡ National team caps and goals as of 13 November 2026

Žan Celar (born 14 March 1999) is a Slovenian professional footballer who plays as a forward for Swiss Super League club Basel and the Slovenia national team.

== Club career ==
=== Roma ===
Celar made his Serie A debut for Roma on 11 March 2019 in a game against Empoli, as an 86th-minute substitute for Patrik Schick.

On 10 July 2019, Celar joined Serie B club Cittadella on loan until January 2020. On 30 January 2020, he moved on loan to Cremonese. After scoring two goals in eleven appearances during the 2019–20 Serie B season, his loan was extended for another season in August 2020.

=== Lugano ===
In the summer of 2021, Celar joined Swiss Super League club Lugano on a contract until 2025, joining his countryman Sandi Lovrić. He was given the number 19 jersey. In his first season with the club, Celar won the 2021–22 Swiss Cup, and also scored in the final against St. Gallen as Lugano won 4–1. Overall, he scored 40 goals in 95 appearances in the Swiss Super League over the course of three seasons, and was also the league's top scorer in the 2023–24 season.

=== Queens Park Rangers ===
On 19 July 2024, Celar transferred to the EFL Championship side Queens Park Rangers for an undisclosed fee. He made his debut for the club on 10 August in a 3–1 loss against West Bromwich Albion. On 23 November 2024, having still yet to score for the club, Celar missed a penalty in a 1–1 draw with Stoke City. Having retained the support of manager Martí Cifuentes following the miss, he scored twice in the following match as QPR secured their second league win of the season.

=== Basel ===
On 17 July 2026, Basel announced that they had signed Celar from Queens Park Rangers on a three-year contract until summer 2029. Eight days later, in the first round of the Super League season against Servette, he was in the starting eleven and scored the game-winning goal for Basel after converting the penalty kick, his first goal in official competitions after more than 600 days.

== International career ==
Between 2014 and 2021, Celar played for all Slovenian youth teams from under-16 to under-21, making 46 appearances for all teams combined and scoring 17 goals.

On 14 November 2021, Celar debuted for the senior team in a World Cup qualifying match against Cyprus.

== Career statistics ==
=== Club ===
As of match played 2 November 2025

Appearances and goals by club, season and competition
Club	Season	League			National cup (Note: Includes Coppa Italia, Swiss Cup)		Continental		Other		Total	
Club	Season	Division	Apps	Goals	Apps	Goals	Apps	Goals	Apps	Goals	Apps	Goals
Maribor	2015–16	PrvaLiga	1	0	0	0	0	0	—		1	0
Roma	2018–19	Serie A	1	0	0	0	0	0	—		1	0
Cittadella (loan)	2019–20	Serie B	10	1	3	2	—		—		13	3
Cremonese (loan)	2019–20	Serie B	11	2	—		—		—		11	2
Cremonese (loan)	2020–21	Serie B	27	2	2	0	—		—		29	2
Cremonese (loan)	Total		38	4	2	0	0	0	—		40	4
Lugano	2021–22	Swiss Super League	29	10	5	4	—		—		34	14
Lugano	2022–23	Swiss Super League	30	16	3	0	1 (Note: Appearance in UEFA Europa Conference League)	0	—		34	16
Lugano	2023–24	Swiss Super League	36	14	5	6	7 (Note: Two appearances in UEFA Europa League, five appearances and one goal in UEFA Europa Conference League)	1	—		48	21
Lugano	Total		95	40	13	10	8	1	—		116	51
Queens Park Rangers	2024–25	EFL Championship	19	2	0	0	—		3 (Note: Appearances in EFL Cup)	0	22	2
Queens Park Rangers	2025–26	EFL Championship	2	0	0	0	—		0	0	2	0
Queens Park Rangers	Total		21	2	0	0	—		3	0	24	2
Fortuna Düsseldorf (loan)	2025–26	2. Bundesliga	7	0	0	0	—		—		7	0
Career total			173	47	18	12	8	1	3	0	202	60

=== International ===
As of match played 13 November 2026

Appearances and goals by national team and year
National team	Year	Apps	Goals
Slovenia	2021	1	0
Slovenia	2022	5	0
Slovenia	2023	2	0
Slovenia	2024	9	0
Slovenia	2025	0	0
Slovenia	2026	4	0
Total		21	0

== Honours ==
Lugano

- Swiss Cup: 2021–22

Individual

- Swiss Super League top scorer: 2023–24
