= Eric Pédat =

Swiss footballer (born 1967)

Personal information
- Date of birth: 23 July 1967 (age 59)
- Place of birth: Geneva, Switzerland
- Height: 1.79 m (5 ft 10 in)
- Position: Goalkeeper

Senior career*
Years	Team	Apps	(Gls)
1986–1987	Servette FC	0	(0)
1987–1989	Étoile Carouge FC	69	(0)
1989–1993	Servette FC	67	(0)
1993–1996	FC St. Gallen	102	(0)
1996–2002	Servette FC	204	(0)
Total		442	(0)
- * Club domestic league appearances and goals

Eric Pédat (born 23 July 1967) is a retired Swiss football goalkeeper.

== Personal life ==
Pédat is the father of the professional footballer Nils Pédat.
