= Yannis Letard =

French Guianan footballer (born 1998)

Personal information
- Date of birth: 18 August 1998 (age 28)
- Place of birth: Saint-Herblain, France
- Height: 1.88 m (6 ft 2 in)
- Position: Defender

Team information
- Current team: Les Herbiers
- Number: 18

Youth career
- –2016: Rennes
- 2016–2018: Guingamp

Senior career*
| Years | Team | Apps | (Gls) |
| 2016–2018 | Guingamp II | 23 | (1) |
| 2018–2019 | VfR Aalen | 8 | (0) |
| 2019–2021 | St. Gallen | 34 | (1) |
| 2021–2023 | LASK | 11 | (0) |
| 2024 | LASK Amateure OÖ | 5 | (1) |
| 2025 | USSA Vertou | 5 | (0) |
| 2025– | Les Herbiers | 3 | (1) |

International career^{‡}
| 2023– | French Guiana | 8 | (0) |
- * Club domestic league appearances and goals as of 4 December 2025 ‡ National team caps and goals as of 4 December 2025

Yannis Letard (born 18 August 1998) is a professional footballer who plays as a defender for Championnat National 1 side Les Herbiers. Born in Metropolitan France, he plays for the French Guiana national team.

== International career ==
Letard was called up to the French Guiana national team for a set of CONCACAF Nations League matches in October 2023.

== Career statistics ==
=== Club ===
As of match played 8 October 2023

Appearances and goals by club, season and competition
| Club | Season | League | | | National cup (Note: Includes Swiss Cup, Austrian Cup) | | Europe | | Other | | Total | |
| Club | Season | Division | Apps | Goals | Apps | Goals | Apps | Goals | Apps | Goals | Apps | Goals |
|---|---|---|---|---|---|---|---|---|---|---|---|---|
| Aalen | 2018–19 | 3. Liga | 8 | 0 | — | | — | | 2 (Note: Appearance(s) in Württemberg Cup) | 0 | 10 | 0 |
| St. Gallen | 2019–20 | Swiss Super League | 26 | 1 | 1 | 0 | — | | — | | 27 | 1 |
| St. Gallen | 2020–21 | Swiss Super League | 8 | 0 | 0 | 0 | 0 | 0 | — | | 8 | 0 |
| St. Gallen | Total | | 34 | 1 | 1 | 0 | 0 | 0 | — | | 35 | 1 |
| LASK | 2021–22 | Austrian Bundesliga | 11 | 0 | 2 | 0 | 6 (Note: Appearances in UEFA Europa Conference League) | 0 | — | | 19 | 0 |
| Career total | | | 53 | 1 | 3 | 0 | 6 | 0 | 2 | 0 | 64 | 1 |
