= 2021–22 Swiss Cup =

Tournament details
- Country: Switzerland
- Date: 13 August 2021 – 15 May 2022
- Teams: 64

Final positions
- Champions: Lugano (4th title)
- Runners-up: St. Gallen

Tournament statistics
- Matches played: 63
- Goals scored: 257 (4.08 per match)
- Top goal scorer(s): Koro Koné; Fabian Schubert; 5 goals

The 2021–22 Swiss Cup was the 97th season of Switzerland's annual football cup competition. The competition began on 13 August 2021 with the first games of Round 1. The final was held on 15 May 2022 at Wankdorf Stadium, Bern. Lugano defeated last year's runners-up St. Gallen 4–1 in the final to win their fourth Swiss Cup.

Luzern were the title holders, but lost to Lugano in the semi-finals.

== Participants ==
2021–22 Super League; 10 teams	2021–22 Challenge League; 9 teams	2021–22 Promotion League; 8 teams	2021–22 1. Liga; 10 teams	2021–22 2. Liga Interregional; 16 teams	2021–22 2. Liga; 8 teams	2021–22 Regional lower leagues 3 teams
FC Lugano; FC Zürich; FC Lausanne-Sport; FC Sion; BSC Young Boys; FC St. Gallen 1879; Grasshopper Club Zürich; FC Basel; Servette FC; FC Luzern	FC Schaffhausen; Yverdon-Sport FC; FC Wil 1900; FC Thun; Neuchâtel Xamax FCS; FC Stade Lausanne-Ouchy; SC Kriens; FC Winterthur; FC Aarau	SC YF Juventus; FC Biel-Bienne; FC Stade Nyonnais; Étoile Carouge FC; FC Black Stars; FC Chiasso; FC Rapperswil-Jona; SC Cham	FC La Chaux-de-Fonds; FC Paradiso; FC Solothurn; FC Baden; CS Chênois; FC Münsingen; FC Vevey United; SR Delémont; FC Bulle; SC Buochs	SC Binningen; FC Concordia Basel; FC Seuzach; FC Echichens; FC Grand-Saconnex; FC Bubendorf; FC Châtel-St-Denis; FC Lachen/Altendorf; FC Gambarogno-Contone; FC Unterstrass; FC Widnau; FC Amical Saint-Prex; FC Genolier-Begnins; FC Rorschach Goldach 17; FC Kickers Luzern; FC Coffrane	FC Winkeln SG; FC Saint-Léonard; FC Porrentruy; FC Iliria; FC Littau; FC Schönenwerd-Niedergösgen; FC Dardania Lausanne; FC Bosporus	3. Liga; FC Escholzmatt-Marbach; 4. Liga; FC Hausen am Albis; FC Someo

== Round dates ==
The schedule of the competition is as follows.

Round	Match date
Round 1	13/14/15 August 2021
Round 2	17/18/19 September 2021
Round 3	26/27 October 2021
Quarter Final	9 February 2022
Semi Final	20 April 2022
Final	15 May 2022

== Round 1 ==
Home advantage was granted to the team from the lower league, if applicable. Teams in bold continued to the next round of the competition.

13 August 2021	FC La Chaux-de-Fonds	**1–7**	**FC Lugano**	La Chaux-de-Fonds
19:30 CEST (UTC+1)	Ramdani 67'	Report	Bottani 12' 21' 41'; Covilo 27'; Ankrah 50'; Lungoyi 71'; Muci 89'	Stadium: Centre Sportif de la Charrière

13 August 2021	**FC Paradiso**	**3–1** (a.e.t.)	SC Young Fellows Juventus	Paradiso
20:00 CEST (UTC+1)	Becchio 36' (pen.); Lleshi 105+1' 120+1'	Report	Pereira 59'	Stadium: Pian Scairolo

13 August 2021	SC Binningen	**0–7**	**FC Schaffhausen**	Binningen
20:15 CEST (UTC+1)		Report	Del Toro 8' 31'; Vogrig 18'; Rodriguez 40'; Lenna 51'; Berglas 56'; Sahitaj 76'	Stadium: Spiegelfeld

14 August 2021	FC Solothurn	**0–10**	**FC Zürich**	Solothurn
16:00 CEST (UTC+1)		Report	Lopez 3' 19'; Marchesano 4' 35' 45+1'; Gogia 23'; Gnonto 61' (pen.); Krasniqi 76'; Ceesay 84' 87'	Stadium: Stadion FC Solothurn

14 August 2021	FC Baden	**2–4**	**FC Biel-Bienne**	Fislisbach
16:00 CEST (UTC+1)	Teichmann 15'; Weber 43'	Report	Grasso 29'; Colamartino 41'; Mäder 47'; Ghomrani 86'	Stadium: Esp Stadium

14 August 2021	FC Winkeln SG	**1–7**	**FC Concordia Basel**	St. Gallen
16:00 CEST (UTC+1)	Grünenfelder 40' (pen.)	Report	Alessio 9' 21' 66'; Validzic 29'; Ahmeti 65' 73'; Jenni 72'	Stadium: Grundenmoos

14 August 2021	FC Seuzach	**0–12**	**Yverdon-Sport FC**	Seuzach
17:00 CEST (UTC+1)		Report	Kone 8' 37' 39' 57'; Ninte 11' 86'; Abeka 13' 53'; Gétaz 20'; Mobulu 43'; Eleouet 69'; Eberhard 80'	Stadium: Sportplatz Rolli

14 August 2021	FC Stade Nyonnais	**0–1**	**FC Wil 1900**	Nyon
17:00 CEST (UTC+1)		Report	Muntwiler 43'	Stadium: Colovray Sports Centre

14 August 2021	FC Saint-Léonard	**1–3**	**FC Porrentruy**	Saint-Léonard
17:00 CEST (UTC+1)	Petit 82' (pen.)	Report	Jolidon 13' (pen.) 87'; Gabioud 80'	Stadium: Stade des Daillets

14 August 2021	FC Escholzmatt-Marbach	**3–4** (a.e.t.)	**FC Iliria**	Escholzmatt-Marbach
17:00 CEST (UTC+1)	Kaufmann 10' (pen.); Schöpfer 40'; Azizi 81'	Report	Andrijasevic 55'; Halimi 83'; Dakaj 90+6'; Frrokaj 98'	Stadium: Sportplatz Ebnet

14 August 2021	FC Echichens	**0–2**	**FC Lausanne-Sport**	Echichens
17:30 CEST (UTC+1)		Report	Puertas 48'; Amdouni 51'	Stadium: Terrain Grand Record

14 August 2021	FC Grand-Saconnex	**2–2** (a.e.t.) (**1–4** p)	**CS Chênois**	Le Grand-Saconnex
17:30 CEST (UTC+1)	Leal 86' 118'	Report	Passi 13'; Imbriaco 104'	Stadium: Stade du Blanché

14 August 2021	FC Bubendorf	**0–3**	**FC Sion**	Bubendorf
18:00 CEST (UTC+1)		Report	Stojilkovic 4'; Karlen 37'; Uldrikis 75'	Stadium: Brühl

14 August 2021	FC Châtel-St-Denis	**1–8**	**FC Thun**	Châtel-Saint-Denis
18:00 CEST (UTC+1)	Selimi 90'	Report	Dzonlagic 14'; Kyeremateng 44' 45'; Ndongo 47'; Roth 64'; Ahmed 79'; Chihadeh 81'; Schmidt 87'	Stadium: Stade du Lussy

14 August 2021	FC Littau	**1–4**	**BSC Young Boys**	Littau
18:00 CEST (UTC+1)	Izzo 90'	Report	Kanga 18'; Sierro 42'; Aebischer 52'; Zesiger 57'	Stadium: Ruopigen

14 August 2021	FC Münsingen	**0–5**	**FC St. Gallen**	Münsingen
18:00 CEST (UTC+1)		Report	Schubert 9'; Abril 21' (pen.); Youan 33'; Görtler 71'; Duah 89'	Stadium: Sportanlage Sandreutenen

14 August 2021	FC Lachen/Altendorf	**0–6**	**Neuchâtel Xamax FCS**	Lachen
18:00 CEST (UTC+1)		Report	Mafouta 17' 31' 64'; Tavares 42'; Alto 80'; Haile-Selassie 90'	Stadium: Peterswinkel

14 August 2021	FC Gambarogno-Contone	**0–2**	**Étoile Carouge FC**	Magadino
18:00 CEST (UTC+1)		Report	Boussaha 27'; Konan 85'	Stadium: Centro Sportivo Regionale Magadino

14 August 2021	FC Hausen am Albis	**0–6**	**FC Black Stars Basel**	Hausen am Albis
18:00 CEST (UTC+1)		Report	Kiendrebeogo 26' (pen.); Ferreira 36' 56'; Adamczyk 41'; Zunic 42'; Fazlija 51'	Stadium: Jonentäli

14 August 2021	FC Unterstrass	**1–3** (a.e.t.)	**FC Chiasso**	Zürich
18:00 CEST (UTC+1)	Sall 51'	Report	Maccoppi 90+6' (pen.); Carrasco 101'; Ronchetti 118'	Stadium: Steinkluppe

14 August 2021	FC Rapperswil-Jona	**2–3**	**FC Stade Lausanne-Ouchy**	Rapperswil
19:00 CEST (UTC+1)	Ciarrocchi 46'; Casciato 66'	Report	Chader 40'; Ajdini 45'; Bamba 79'	Stadium: Stadion Grünfeld

14 August 2021	FC Vevey United	**1–3**	**SC Kriens**	Vevey
19:30 CEST (UTC+1)	Cid 76'	Report	Binous 67'; Mulaj 84'; Sessolo 90+3'	Stadium: Stade de Copet

14 August 2021	SR Delémont	**0–6**	**FC Winterthur**	Delémont
20:00 CEST (UTC+1)		Report	Buess 32' (pen.); Baak 53'; Isik 62'; Ballet 76' 86'; Volkart 79'	Stadium: La Blancherie

15 August 2021	FC Widnau	**0–5**	**Grasshopper Club Zürich**	Widnau
14:00 CEST (UTC+1)		Report	Demhasaj 5'; Momoh 53'; Gjorgjev 56'; Santos 59'; Da Silva 72'	Stadium: Aegeten

15 August 2021	FC Schönenwerd-Niedergösgen	**0–7**	**FC Basel**	Niedergösgen
14:00 CEST (UTC+1)		Report	Tushi 21' 62'; Petretta 38'; Palacios 41' (pen.); Males 53'; Sene 57'; Lo Priore 58'	Stadium: Inseli

15 August 2021	FC Amical Saint-Prex	**0–6**	**Servette FC**	Saint-Prex
15:00 CEST (UTC+1)		Report	Antunes 1' 23' 45+1'; Oberlin 41'; Valls 82' (pen.); Mendes 83'	Stadium: Stade de Marcy

15 August 2021	FC Genolier-Begnins	**1–7**	**FC Bulle**	Genolier
15:00 CEST (UTC+1)	Gianina 78'	Report	Bersier 18' 63' 65' 73'; Deschenaux 36' 82'; Edoh 47'	Stadium: Terrain du Pesant d'Or

15 August 2021	FC Dardania Lausanne	**1–2** (a.e.t.)	**FC Rorschach Goldach 17**	Chavannes
15:30 CEST (UTC+1)	Shehu 65'	Report	Baumann 50'; Janjatovic 111'	Stadium: Centre sportif de Chavannes

15 August 2021	SC Cham	**0–1**	**FC Luzern**	Cham
16:00 CEST (UTC+1)		Report	Ndiaye 45+1'	Stadium: Stadion Eizmoos

15 August 2021	**FC Bosporus**	**1–0**	FC Kickers Luzern	Bern
16:00 CEST (UTC+1)	Rebronja 8'	Report		Stadium: Wyler

15 August 2021	FC Someo	**0–7**	**FC Aarau**	Maggia
17:00 CEST (UTC+1)		Report	Rrudhani 7'; Almeida 13' 28' (pen.) 50'; Spadanuda 75' 77'; Caserta 88'	Stadium: Campo La Pineta

24 August 2021	FC Coffrane	**1–4**	**SC Buochs**	Coffrane
20:00 CEST (UTC+1)	Briançon 55'	Report	Yildiz 4'; Rüedi 42'; Berisha 66'; Neziraj 82'	Stadium: BEG Stadium

== Round 2 ==
Home advantage was granted to the team from the lower league, if applicable.

17 September 2021	FC Bulle	2–3 (a.e.t.)	FC Lausanne-Sport	Bulle
19:30 CEST (UTC+1)	Deschenaux 47'; Zohouri 90+5' (o.g.)	Report	Genoud 9' (o.g.); George 11'; Zohouri 95'	Stadium: Stade de Bouleyres

17 September 2021	SC Kriens	0–1	FC Zürich	Kriens
19:30 CEST (UTC+1)		Report	Marchesano 19'	Stadium: Stadion Kleinfeld

17 September 2021	FC Concordia Basel	1–4	Servette FC	Basel
20:00 CEST (UTC+1)	Alessio 20'	Report	Schalk 10' 90'; Rodelin 47'; Imeri 86'	Stadium: Stadion Rankhof

17 September 2021	Neuchâtel Xamax FCS	0–1	FC Lugano	Neuchâtel
20:00 CEST (UTC+1)		Report	Lungoyi 89'	Stadium: Stade de la Maladière

17 September 2021	Yverdon-Sport FC	3–0	FC Wil 1900	Yverdon-les-Bains
20:00 CEST (UTC+1)	Kone 17'; Vladi 32'; Eberhard 87'	Report		Stadium: Stade Municipal

18 September 2021	FC Black Stars Basel	1–3	FC Biel-Bienne	Basel
15:00 CEST (UTC+1)	Jankowski 89'	Report	Garcia 53'; Nuzzolo 82'; Adjei 90+3' (pen.)	Stadium: Buschwilerhof

18 September 2021	FC Stade Lausanne Ouchy	4–0	FC Sion	Lausanne
17:00 CEST (UTC+1)	Chader 13'; Zac 36'; Ajdini 50'; Bayard 90'	Report		Stadium: Stade olympique de la Pontaise

18 September 2021	SC Buochs	1–2 (a.e.t.)	FC Luzern	Buochs
18:00 CEST (UTC+1)	Neziraj 69' (pen.)	Report	Sorgic 45'; Ugrinic 94'	Stadium: Stadion Seefeld

18 September 2021	FC Paradiso	0–1	FC Aarau	Paradiso
18:00 CEST (UTC+1)		Report	Spadanuda 84'	Stadium: Pian Scairolo

18 September 2021	Étoile Carouge FC	3–1	FC Winterthur	Carouge
18:00 CEST (UTC+1)	Kursner 1'; Mettler 22'; Dia 62'	Report	Schattin 36'	Stadium: Stade de la Fontenette

18 September 2021	FC Bosporus	0–11	FC Schaffhausen	Bern
19:00 CEST (UTC+1)		Report	Kalem 5' 23' 58'; Padula 40' 45+1' 87'; Prtajin 52' 59'; Gonzalez 64'; Rodriguez 80' (pen.); Kastrati 90+3'	Stadium: Wyler

18 September 2021	FC Thun	1–0	Grasshopper Club Zürich	Thun
20:15 CEST (UTC+1)	Sutter 59'	Report		Stadium: Stockhorn Arena

19 September 2021	FC Rorschach Goldach 17	0–3	FC Basel	Goldach
14:30 CEST (UTC+1)		Report	Millar 35'; Xhaka 62'; Palacios 79'	Stadium: Sportanlage Kellen

19 September 2021	CS Chênois	2–7	FC St. Gallen	Thônex
15:00 CEST (UTC+1)	Munishi 66'; Clement 69'	Report	Schubert 9' 30' 41' 45+1'; Stillhart 62'; Cabral 75'; Besio 88'	Stadium: Stade des Trois-Chêne

19 September 2021	FC Iliria	1–7	BSC Young Boys	Solothurn
16:00 CEST (UTC+1)	Elezi 79'	Report	Sulejmani 15'; Kanga 29' 43' 66'; Maceiras 33'; Rieder 35'; Burgy 44'	Stadium: Mittleres Brühl

19 September 2021	FC Porrentruy	0–3	FC Chiasso	Porrentruy
16:00 CEST (UTC+1)		Report	Correia 54'; Evans 82' 86'	Stadium: Stade du Tirage

== Round 3 ==
Home advantage was granted to the team from the lower league, if applicable.

26 October 2021	FC Aarau	0–1	FC Lausanne-Sport	Aarau
19:00 CEST (UTC+1)		Report	Amdouni 56'	Stadium: Stadion Brügglifeld; Attendance: 1,928; Referee: Lukas Fähndrich

26 October 2021	FC Biel-Bienne	1–0	FC Stade Lausanne Ouchy	Biel/Bienne
20:00 CEST (UTC+1)	Beyer 89' (pen.)	Report		Stadium: Tissot Arena; Attendance: 634; Referee: Luca Piccolo

26 October 2021	Yverdon-Sport FC	2–2 (a.e.t.) (11–10 p)	FC Zürich	Yverdon-les-Bains
20:15 CEST (UTC+1)	Beleck 43' 94'	Report	Gnonto 71'; Hornschuh 104'	Stadium: Stade Municipal; Attendance: 712; Referee: Fedayi San
	Penalties
	Beleck (penalty scored); Hajrović (penalty scored); Ninte (penalty missed); Silva (penalty scored); Eleouet (penalty missed); Fargues (penalty scored); Lusuena (penalty scored); Jaquenoud (penalty scored); Blum (penalty scored); Salvi (penalty scored); Beleck (penalty scored); Hajrović (penalty scored); Ninte (penalty scored)		Marchesano (penalty missed); Kryeziu (penalty scored); Pollero (penalty missed); Gnonto (penalty scored); Krasniqi (penalty scored); Leitner (penalty scored); Guerrero (penalty scored); Hornschuh (penalty scored); Rohner (penalty scored); Aliti (penalty scored); Kryeziu (penalty scored); Leitner (penalty scored); Krasniqi (penalty missed)

27 October 2021	Étoile Carouge FC	1–0	FC Basel	Carouge
19:00 CEST (UTC+1)	Kursner 54'	Report		Stadium: Stade de la Fontenette; Attendance: 3,018; Referee: Sven Wolfensberger

27 October 2021	FC Lugano	2–1	BSC Young Boys	Lugano
19:00 CEST (UTC+1)	Celar 22'; Amoura 83'	Report	Rieder 90+1'	Stadium: Cornaredo Stadium; Attendance: 5,914; Referee: Alain Bieri

27 October 2021	FC Chiasso	1–2 (a.e.t.)	FC St. Gallen	Chiasso
19:30 CEST (UTC+1)	Farnerud 88'	Report	Duah 79' 107'	Stadium: Stadio Comunale; Attendance: 400; Referee: Lukas Fähndrich

27 October 2021	FC Thun	4–1	Servette FC	Thun
20:00 CEST (UTC+1)	Dzonlagic 57'; Bürki 60'; Gerndt 65'; Havenaar 83'	Report	Stevanovic 44'	Stadium: Stockhorn Arena; Attendance: 2,298; Referee: Fedayi San

27 October 2021	FC Schaffhausen	0–2	FC Luzern	Schaffhausen
20:15 CEST (UTC+1)		Report	Ndiaye 30'; Tasar 88'	Stadium: LIPO Park Schaffhausen; Attendance: 1,586; Referee: Sandro Schärer

== Quarter-finals ==
Home advantage was granted to the team from the lower league, if applicable.

8 February 2022	Yverdon-Sport FC	1–0	FC Lausanne Sport	Yverdon
20:00	Beleck 22' (pen.)	Report		Stadium: Stade Municipal Yverdon; Attendance: 2,770; Referee: Alain Bieri

9 February 2022	Étoile Carouge FC	1–2	FC St. Gallen	Carouge
20:00	Kursner 81'	Report	Görtler 23'; Jankewitz 66'	Stadium: Stade de la Fontenette; Attendance: 3,700; Referee: Alessandro Dudic

9 February 2022	FC Biel-Bienne	0–5	FC Luzern	Biel/Bienne
20:30		Report	Emini 13', 82'; Sorgić 44'; Dräger 45+1'; Campo 68'	Stadium: Tissot Arena; Attendance: 2,828; Referee: Luca Cibelli

10 February 2022	FC Thun	3–4	FC Lugano	Thun
18:30	Sutter 32'; Dorn 50'; Gerndt 84' (pen.)	Report	Haile-Selassie 12'; Yuri 14'; Sabbatini 73'; Lovrić 80'	Stadium: Stockhorn Arena; Attendance: 3,912; Referee: Sandro Schärer

== Semi-finals ==
21 April 2022	Yverdon-Sport FC	0–2	FC St. Gallen	Yverdon
19:00		Report	Guillemenot 54'; Quintillà 60'	Stadium: Stade Municipal Yverdon; Attendance: 4,500; Referee: Lukas Fähndrich

21 April 2022	FC Lugano	2–2 (a.e.t.) (4–3 p)	FC Luzern	Lugano
	Celar 72', 93' (pen.)		Sidler 89'; Abubakar 119'	Stadium: Cornaredo Stadium; Attendance: 6,390; Referee: Fedayi San
	Penalties
	Marić (penalty missed); Lovrić (penalty scored); Yuri (penalty scored); Ziegler (penalty scored); Celar (penalty scored)		(penalty scored) Schulz; (penalty scored) Campo; (penalty missed) Ugrinic; (penalty missed) Schürpf; (penalty scored) Tasar

== Final ==
15 May 2022	FC Lugano	4–1	FC St. Gallen	Bern
14:00	Celar 5'; Custodio 44'; Bottani 58'; Haile-Selassie 70'	Report	Maglica 21'	Stadium: Stadion Wankdorf; Attendance: 28,500; Referee: Urs Schnyder
