= Olivier Custodio =

Swiss footballer (born 1995)

Personal information
- Full name: Oliver Custodio Da Costa
- Date of birth: 10 February 1995 (age 31)
- Place of birth: Montreux, Switzerland
- Height: 1.79 m (5 ft 10 in)
- Position: Defensive midfielder

Team information
- Current team: Lausanne-Sport
- Number: 10

Youth career
- Montreux-Sports
- FC Yvorne
- Lausanne-Sport

Senior career*
Years	Team	Apps	(Gls)
2013–2017	Team Vaud U21	27	(11)
2013–2017	Lausanne-Sport	83	(3)
2017–2019	Luzern	54	(0)
2019–2022	Lugano	93	(6)
2022–	Lausanne-Sport	130	(4)

International career^{‡}
2010	Switzerland U15	3	(0)
2010–2011	Switzerland U16	14	(0)
2011–2012	Switzerland U17	10	(0)
2012–2013	Switzerland U18	6	(0)
2013–2014	Switzerland U19	9	(1)
2015–2016	Switzerland U20	4	(0)
2015	Switzerland U-21	1	(0)
- * Club domestic league appearances and goals as of 28 September 2026 ‡ National team caps and goals as of 16:26, 17 May 2022 (UTC)

Oliver Custodio Da Costa (born 10 February 1995) is a Swiss professional footballer who plays as a defensive midfielder for Lausanne-Sport.

== Club career ==
On 31 August 2013, Custodio made his professional debut with FC Lausanne-Sport in a 2013–14 Swiss Super League match against FC Thun replacing Salim Khelifi (90th minute).

In the summer of 2017, he was transferred to FC Luzern. On 18 June 2019, he signed a three-year deal with FC Lugano. On 15 May 2022, Custodio scored a goal in Lugano's 4–1 victory over St. Gallen in the final of the Swiss Cup.

On 11 June 2022, Custodio returned to Lausanne-Sport.

== Honours ==
Lugano

- Swiss Cup: 2021–22
