= Sebastian Osigwe =

Nigerian footballer (born 1994)

Personal information
- Full name: Sebastian Ogenna Osigwe
- Date of birth: 26 March 1994 (age 32)
- Place of birth: Luzern, Switzerland
- Height: 1.85 m (6 ft 1 in)
- Position: Goalkeeper

Team information
- Current team: AC Bellinzona
- Number: 58

Senior career*
Years	Team	Apps	(Gls)
2010–2012	Luzern U21	1	(0)
2012–2013	Emmenbrücke	16	(0)
2013–2014	Zug 94	0	(0)
2014–2020	Kriens	132	(0)
2020–2025	Lugano	30	(0)
2024	Lugano II	14	(0)
2025–	Bellinzona	4	(0)
- * Club domestic league appearances and goals as of 26 May 2026

Sebastian Ogenna Osigwe (born 26 March 1994) is a Nigerian footballer who plays for AC Bellinzona.

== International career ==
Osigwe was born in Switzerland to an Igbo Nigerian father and Swiss mother. He was called up to represent the Nigeria national team in October 2020.

== Honours ==
Lugano

- Swiss Cup: 2021–22
