= Leonid Srdić =

Swiss footballer (born 2002)

Personal information
- Full name: Leonid Lenny Frédéric Srdić
- Date of birth: 23 January 2002 (age 24)
- Place of birth: Uster, Switzerland
- Height: 1.85 m (6 ft 1 in)
- Position: Centre-back

Youth career
- FC Unterstrass
- Zürich
- 2020–2021: Union Berlin
- 2021–2022: Lugano

Senior career*
Years	Team	Apps	(Gls)
2021–2024	Lugano II	66	(3)
2022–2024	Lugano	1	(0)

International career^{‡}
2018–2019	Bosnia and Herzegovina U18	4	(0)
2020	Bosnia and Herzegovina U19	2	(0)
- * Club domestic league appearances and goals as of 25 May 2024 ‡ National team caps and goals as of 17:32, 18 July 2022 (UTC)

Leonid Lenny Frédéric Srdić (born 23 January 2002) is a professional footballer who plays as a centre-back. Born in Switzerland, he is a youth international for Bosnia and Herzegovina.

== Career ==
A youth product of FC Unterstrass, and Zürich, he moved to Germany with the youth academy of Union Berlin in 2020. He returned to Switzerland with Lugano signing a contract on 27 July 2021. He made his professional debut with Lugano in a 2–1 Swiss Super League loss to Basel on 22 May 2022.

== International career ==
Born in Switzerland, Srdić is of Bosnian descent. He is a youth international for Bosnia having represented the Bosnia and Herzegovina U18s and U19s.
