= Marculino Ninte =

Bissau-Guinean footballer (born 2000)

Personal information
- Full name: Marculino Francisco Ninte
- Date of birth: 29 December 2003 (age 22)
- Place of birth: Sintra, Portugal
- Height: 1.83 m (6 ft 0 in)
- Position: Winger

Youth career
- 2009–2012: GSMD Talaíde
- 2012–2014: Casa Pia

Senior career*
Years	Team	Apps	(Gls)
2014–2015	Oeiras	0	(0)
2015–2016	Bischofshofen	1	(0)
2016–2017	Sammaurese	25	(2)
2017	Monticelli	7	(0)
2017–2019	Cupello	2	(1)
2019–2023	Yverdon-Sport	68	(14)
2024–2025	Étoile Carouge	33	(2)
2025–2026	Mafra	25	(4)

International career^{‡}
2025–	Guinea-Bissau	1	(0)
- * Club domestic league appearances and goals as of 17 May 2026 ‡ National team caps and goals as of 16:20, 16 October 2025 (UTC)

Marculino Francisco Ninte (born 1 July 1997) is a professional football player who plays as a winger. Born in Portugal, he plays for the Guinea-Bissau national team.

== Career ==
Ninte is a product of the youth academies of the Portuguese clubs GSMD Talaíde, Casa Pia. He began his senior career with Oeiras in 2014 where he played a couple cup matches, before joining the Austrian club Bischofshofen in 2015. He then spent 3 years couple years in the Italian Serie D with Sammaurese, Monticelli, and Cupello successively. In 2019, he moved to the Swiss Promotion League Yverdon-Sport and helped them win the 2020–21 Promotion League, followed by the 2022–23 Swiss Challenge League. On 18 January 2024, he moved to Étoile Carouge and helped them win the 2023–24 Promotion League. On 19 July 2025, he returned to Portugal with Liga 3 club Mafra.

== International career ==
Born in Portugal, Ninte is of Bissau-Guinean descent and holds dual Portuguese and Bissau-Guinean citizenship. He was called up to the Guinea-Bissau national team for a set of 2026 FIFA World Cup qualification matches in October 2025.

== Honours ==
Yverdon-Sport

- Promotion League: 2020–21
- Swiss Challenge League: 2022–23

Étoile Carouge

- Promotion League: 2023–24
