= Yuri (footballer, born January 1996) =

Brazilian footballer

Personal information
- Full name: Yuri Antonio Costa da Silva
- Date of birth: 8 January 1996 (age 30)
- Place of birth: Rio de Janeiro, Brazil
- Height: 1.73 m (5 ft 8 in)
- Positions: Left back; midfielder

Team information
- Current team: Atlético Goianiense

Youth career
- 2014–2016: Botafogo

Senior career*
Years	Team	Apps	(Gls)
2016–2019	Botafogo	17	(0)
2016	→ Gonçalense (loan)	4	(2)
2017	→ Criciúma (loan)	0	(0)
2017	→ Santa Cruz (loan)	13	(0)
2019	→ Figueirense (loan)	8	(1)
2020–2021	Ponte Preta	32	(0)
2021–2022	Lugano	21	(0)
2023	Portuguesa RJ	30	(1)
2024–2025	Athletic	69	(2)
2026	Náutico	21	(0)
2026–	Atlético Goianiense	0	(0)
- * Club domestic league appearances and goals as of 18 December 2025

Yuri Antonio Costa da Silva (born 8 January 1996), simply known as Yuri, is a Brazilian footballer who plays for Atlético Goianiense as either a left back or a midfielder.

== Honours ==
Botafogo

- Campeonato Brasileiro Série B: 2015
- Campeonato Carioca: 2018

Lugano

- Swiss Cup: 2021–22

== Career statistics ==
=== Club ===
As of 28 November 2019.

Club	Season	League			State League		Cup		Continental		Other		Total	
Club	Season	Division	Apps	Goals	Apps	Goals	Apps	Goals	Apps	Goals	Apps	Goals	Apps	Goals
Botafogo	2016	Série A	0	0	—		—		—		—		0	0
Botafogo	2017	Série A	0	0	1	0	—		—		—		1	0
Botafogo	2018	Série A	2	0	0	0	0	0	—		—		2	0
Botafogo	2019	Série A	15	0	—		—		—		—		15	0
Botafogo	Subtotal		17	0	1	0	0	0	—		—		18	0
Gonçalense (loan)	2016	Carioca Série B	—		4	2	—		—		—		4	2
Criciúma (loan)	2017	Série B	0	0	0	0	0	0	—		—		0	0
Santa Cruz (loan)	2017	Série B	13	0	—		—		—		—		13	0
Figueirense (loan)	2019	Série B	0	0	7	1	1	0	—		—		8	1
Career total			30	0	12	3	1	0	0	0	0	0	43	3
