= Albian Hajdari =

Kosovan footballer (born 2003)

Personal information
- Date of birth: 18 May 2003 (age 23)
- Place of birth: Binningen, Switzerland
- Height: 1.90 m (6 ft 3 in)
- Position: Defender

Team information
- Current team: TSG Hoffenheim
- Number: 21

Youth career
- 2012–2014: FC Aesch
- 2014–2020: Basel

Senior career*
Years	Team	Apps	(Gls)
2020–2023	Juventus	0	(0)
2020–2021	→ Basel U21 (loan)	5	(0)
2020–2021	→ Basel (loan)	8	(0)
2022	→ Basel U21 (loan)	5	(0)
2022	→ Basel (loan)	1	(0)
2022–2023	→ Lugano (loan)	18	(0)
2023–2025	Lugano	64	(4)
2025–	TSG Hoffenheim	34	(1)

International career^{‡}
2018	Switzerland U15	4	(0)
2018–2019	Switzerland U16	8	(1)
2019	Switzerland U17	5	(0)
2021	Switzerland U19	5	(0)
2021–2024	Switzerland U21	9	(1)
2025	Switzerland	1	(0)
2025–	Kosovo	8	(0)
- * Club domestic league appearances and goals as of 20 September 2026 ‡ National team caps and goals as of 20:35, 24 September 2026 (UTC)

Albian Hajdari (born 18 May 2003) is a professional footballer who plays as a defender for German Bundesliga club TSG Hoffenheim. Born in Switzerland, he represented that nation at youth and senior international levels before switching to play for the Kosovo national team in 2025.

== Club career ==
Hajdari first played for local club FC Aesch and moved to Basel's youth academy in 2014. He joined FC Basel's first team directly from their U-18 team for their 2020–21 season under head coach Ciriaco Sforza. Somewhat surprising came the announcement on 19 September that Juventus had bought the rights of the young right back defender Hajdari. But Hajdari stayed with the squad, being loaned back to Basel for two seasons.

Hajdari played his professional debut for the club in the away game on 27 September as Basel was defeated 1–0 by Servette. The winning goal was scored from the penalty spot; the penalty was caused as the ball was headed from very close range onto Hajdari's upper right arm. On 15 July 2021, Juventus announced the termination of the loan one year early. However, he did not play any matches with the Juventus U-19. On 4 January 2022, he returned to the Swiss club on a six-month loan.

During his time with Basel's first team, Hajdari played a total of 24 games for them, scoring one goal. Nine of these games were in the Swiss Super League, and 15 were friendly games. He scored his only goal during the test game on 12 January 2022 as Basel beat Lugano 2–1. During his time on loan to Basel, Hajdari also had five appearances in their U-21 team in the third tier of Swiss football.

For the 2022–23 Swiss Super League season Hajdari was loaned to Lugano.

On 1 April 2023, the deal became permanent, and he signed a four-year deal for the club.

On 25 August 2025, Hajdari signed with TSG Hoffenheim in German Bundesliga.

== International career ==
=== Switzerland ===
From 2018, until 2024, Hajdari has been part of Switzerland at the youth international level and has been part of the U15, U16, U17, U19 and U21 teams and he has played with these teams in 31 matches and scored two goals. On 18 May 2024, Hajdari was included in Switzerland national senior team's extended squad for UEFA Euro 2024. However, he was not included in the final squad.

On 7 November 2024, Hajdari received again a call-up from Switzerland for the 2024–25 UEFA Nations League matches against Serbia and Spain, but he was an unused substitute in these matches. His debut with Switzerland came on 25 March 2025 in the friendly match against Luxembourg after coming on as a substitute at the 46th minute in place of Ricardo Rodríguez.

=== Kosovo ===
On 27 August 2025, Hajdari stated in an interview with the Kosovan television channel Kohavision that he had not yet been called up by Switzerland for the September matches and that his international future with Switzerland or Kosovo remained open, while his current focus was on adapting at TSG Hoffenheim. Three days later, he met with the president of the Football Federation of Kosovo, Agim Ademi after TSG Hoffenheim's Bundesliga match against Eintracht Frankfurt, a meeting which prompted speculation about his potential interest in representing Kosovo at international level.

On 29 September 2025, the Football Federation of Kosovo announced that Hajdari had chosen to represent Kosovo at the international level. The following day, FIFA approved his request to switch international allegiance to Kosovo. Three days later, he accepted their call-up for the 2026 FIFA World Cup qualification matches against Slovenia and Sweden. His debut with Kosovo came on 10 October in the 2026 FIFA World Cup qualification match against Slovenia after being named in the starting line-up.

== Personal life ==
Born and raised in Switzerland, Hajdari is of Albanian descent and hails from the town of Kamenica, Kosovo.

== Career statistics ==
=== Club ===
As of match played 20 September 2026

Appearances and goals by club, season and competition
Club	Season	League			National cup (Note: Includes Swiss Cup)		Europe		Other		Total	
Club	Season	Division	Apps	Goals	Apps	Goals	Apps	Goals	Apps	Goals	Apps	Goals
Basel U21 (loan)	2020–21	Swiss Promotion League	5	0	—		—		—		5	0
Basel U21 (loan)	2021–22	Swiss Promotion League	5	0	—		—		—		5	0
Basel U21 (loan)	Total		10	0	—		—		—		10	0
Basel (loan)	2020–21	Swiss Super League	8	0	0	0	0	0	—		8	0
Basel (loan)	2021–22	Swiss Super League	1	0	0	0	0	0	—		1	0
Basel (loan)	Total		9	0	0	0	0	0	—		9	0
Lugano (loan)	2022–23	Swiss Super League	18	0	5	0	1 (Note: Appearance(s) in UEFA Conference League)	0	—		24	0
Lugano	2023–24	Swiss Super League	34	3	3	0	6 (Note: Two appearances in UEFA Europa League, four appearances in UEFA Conference League)	0	—		43	3
Lugano	2024–25	Swiss Super League	30	1	1	0	9 (Note: One appearance in UEFA Champions League, one appearance in UEFA Europa League, seven appearances and one goal in UEFA Conference League)	1	—		40	2
Lugano	2025–26	Swiss Super League	0	0	0	0	1	0	—		1	0
Lugano	Total		64	4	4	0	16	1	—		84	5
1899 Hoffenheim	2025–26	Bundesliga	30	1	1	0	—		—		31	1
1899 Hoffenheim	2026–27	Bundesliga	4	0	1	0	1 (Note: Appearances in UEFA Europa League)	0	—		6	0
1899 Hoffenheim	Total		34	1	2	0	1	0	—		37	1
Career total			135	5	11	0	18	1	—		164	6

=== International ===
As of match played 24 September 2026

Appearances and goals by national team and year
National team	Year	Apps	Goals
Switzerland	2025	1	0
Kosovo	2025	3	0
Kosovo	2026	5	0
Total		9	0
