= Euclides Cabral =

Portuguese footballer

Personal information
- Full name: Euclides Da Silva Cabral
- Date of birth: 5 January 1999 (age 27)
- Place of birth: Lisbon, Portugal
- Height: 1.80 m (5 ft 11 in)
- Position: Full-back

Team information
- Current team: Hassania Agadir
- Number: 19

Youth career
- 2015–2017: FC Sion
- 2017–2019: Sporting CP

Senior career*
Years	Team	Apps	(Gls)
2019–2021	Grasshopper	25	(3)
2021–2022	St. Gallen	42	(0)
2022	Apollon Limassol	6	(0)
2023	Shelbourne	5	(1)
2024–2025	Xamax	31	(4)
2025–	Hassania Agadir	21	(1)
- * Club domestic league appearances and goals as of 5 July 2026

Euclides Da Silva Cabral (born 5 January 1999) is a Portuguese footballer who plays as a full-back for Botola Pro side Hassania Agadir in Morocco.

== Club career ==
On 20 January 2021, he signed a one-and-a-half-year contract with St. Gallen.

On 30 August 2023, he signed for League of Ireland Premier Division side Shelbourne until the end of their season in November.

On 26 April 2024, Xamax announced that Cabral would join the club for the upcoming season. He thus returned to Switzerland to play in the Swiss Challenge League, the second tier of Swiss football.

== Personal life ==
Cabral was born in Portugal and is of Cape Verdean and Santomean descent. He is the cousin of the footballer Gelson Martins.

== Career statistics ==
As of match played on 27 October 2023

Appearances and goals by club, season and competition
Club	Season	League			National Cup		Europe		Other		Total	
Club	Season	Division	Apps	Goals	Apps	Goals	Apps	Goals	Apps	Goals	Apps	Goals
Grasshoppers	2018–19	Swiss Super League	6	0	—		—		—		6	0
Grasshoppers	2019–20	Swiss Challenge League	19	3	2	0	—		—		21	3
Grasshoppers	Total		25	3	2	0	—		—		27	3
St. Gallen	2020–21	Swiss Super League	19	0	4	0	—		—		23	0
St. Gallen	2021–22	Swiss Super League	23	0	3	1	—		—		26	1
St. Gallen	Total		42	0	7	1	—		—		49	1
Apollon Limassol	2022–23	Cypriot First Division	6	0	0	0	10	1	1	0	17	1
Shelbourne	2023	League of Ireland Premier Division	5	1	—		—		—		5	1
Career total			78	4	9	1	10	1	1	0	98	6
