= Lars Lukas Mai =

German footballer (born 2000)

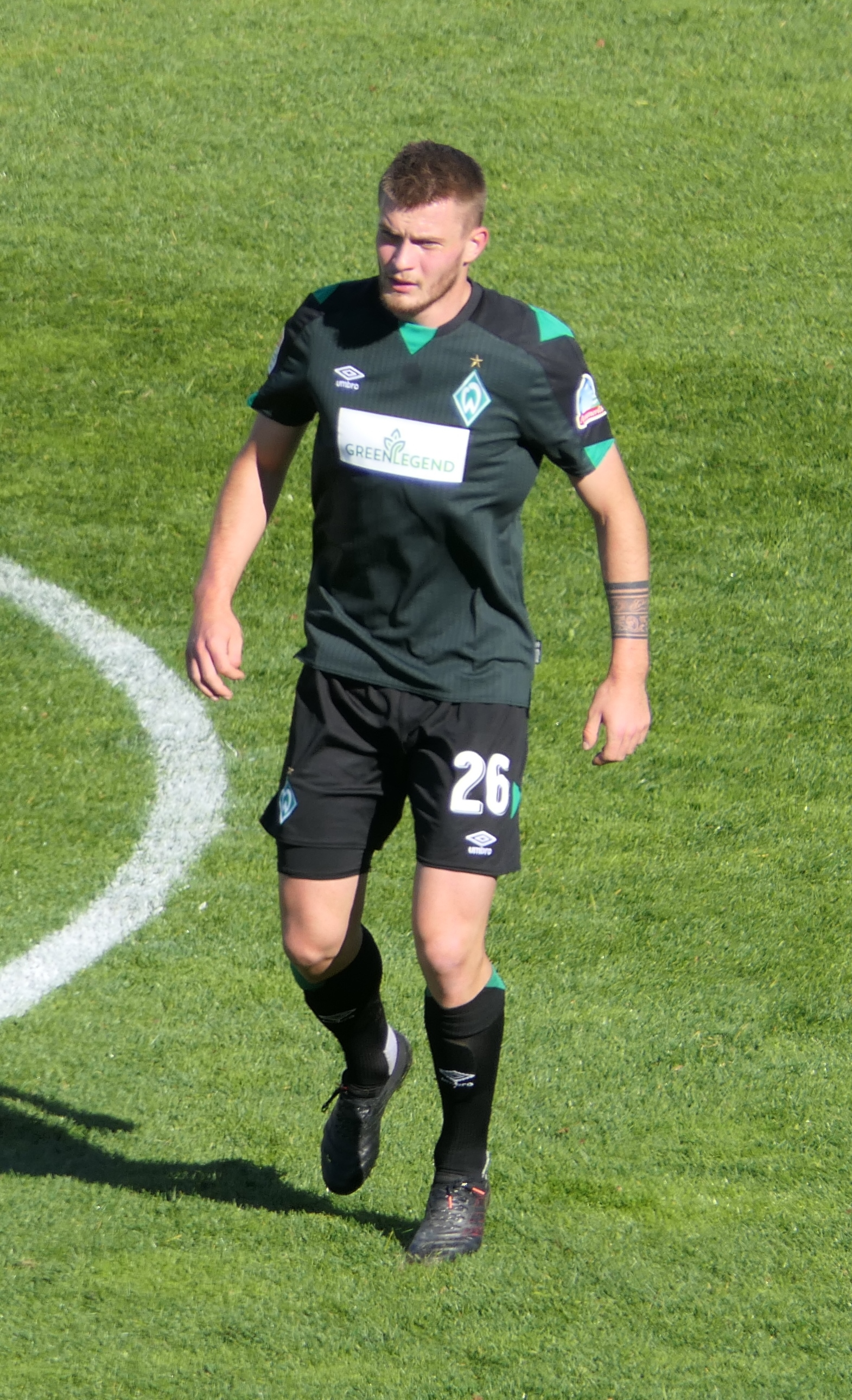
- Mai with Werder Bremen in 2021

Personal information
- Full name: Lars Lukas Mai
- Date of birth: 31 March 2000 (age 26)
- Place of birth: Dresden, Germany
- Height: 1.90 m (6 ft 3 in)
- Position: Centre-back

Team information
- Current team: Lugano
- Number: 17

Youth career
- –2014: Dynamo Dresden
- 2014–2018: Bayern Munich

Senior career*
Years	Team	Apps	(Gls)
2017–2020	Bayern Munich II	54	(3)
2018–2022	Bayern Munich	2	(0)
2020–2021	→ Darmstadt 98 (loan)	29	(0)
2021–2022	→ Werder Bremen (loan)	16	(0)
2022–	Lugano	123	(1)
2023	Lugano II	1	(0)

International career^{‡}
2015	Germany U15	2	(0)
2015–2016	Germany U16	6	(1)
2016–2017	Germany U17	19	(1)
2018	Germany U18	1	(0)
2019	Germany U19	3	(0)
2019–2020	Germany U20	1	(0)
2020–2021	Germany U21	8	(0)
Medal record
Men's football
Representing Germany
UEFA European Under-21 Championship
Winner	2021 Hungary–Slovenia
- * Club domestic league appearances and goals as of 28 September 2026 ‡ National team caps and goals as of 16:27, 13 November 2021 (UTC)

Lars Lukas Mai (born 31 March 2000) is a German professional footballer who plays as a centre-back for Swiss Super League club Lugano. He has represented Germany at various youth levels internationally.

== Club career ==
Lars Lukas Mai, nicknamed Lasse, joined the youth sector of Bayern Munich in July 2014 coming from Dynamo Dresden.

On 21 April 2018, Mai debuted under the coach Jupp Heynckes in the 3–0 away win at Hannover 96. He played the full 90 minutes to become the first player born in the year 2000 to play for Bayern Munich in the Bundesliga.

On 27 April 2018, Mai signed his first professional contract, signing a three-year deal lasting until 30 June 2021.

On 21 July 2020, Mai signed a contract extension and was loaned out to Darmstadt for the 2020–21 season.

He joined Werder Bremen on loan for the 2021–22 season in July 2021.

On 18 June 2022, Mai moved to Swiss Super League club Lugano on a three-year deal until 2025.

== Personal life ==
His father Lars was a member of the Supervisory Board of Dynamo Dresden from November 2013 to September 2017. His older brother Sebastian is also a footballer.

== Career statistics ==
=== Club ===
As of match played 3 April 2024

Appearances and goals by club, season and competition
Club	Season	League			Cup		Continental		Total	
Club	Season	Division	Apps	Goals	Apps	Goals	Apps	Goals	Apps	Goals
Bayern Munich II	2017–18	Regionalliga Bayern	1	0	—		—		1	0
Bayern Munich II	2018–19	Regionalliga Bayern	27	2	—		—		27	2
Bayern Munich II	2019–20	3. Liga	26	1	—		—		26	1
Bayern Munich II	Total		54	3	0	0	0	0	54	3
Bayern Munich	2017–18	Bundesliga	2	0	0	0	0	0	2	0
Darmstadt 98 (loan)	2020–21	2. Bundesliga	29	0	3	0	—		32	0
Werder Bremen (loan)	2021–22	2. Bundesliga	16	0	1	0	—		17	0
Lugano	2022–23	Swiss Super League	19	0	3	0	1 (Note: Appearance in UEFA Europa Conference League)	0	23	0
Lugano	2023–24	Swiss Super League	25	0	3	0	7 (Note: 1 appearance in UEFA Europa League and 6 appearances in UEFA Europa Conference League)	0	35	0
Lugano	Total		44	0	6	0	8	0	58	0
Career total			145	3	10	0	8	0	163	3

== Honours ==
Bayern Munich II

- Regionalliga Bayern: 2018–19
- Premier League International Cup: 2018–19

Bayern Munich

- Bundesliga: 2017–18, 2018–19, 2019–20
- DFB-Pokal: 2018–19, 2019–20

Individual

- Fritz Walter Medal U17 Bronze: 2017
