= Allan Arigoni =

Swiss footballer (born 1998)

Personal information
- Date of birth: 4 November 1998 (age 28)
- Place of birth: Zürich, Switzerland
- Height: 1.83 m (6 ft 0 in)
- Position: Right-back

Team information
- Current team: Grasshopper
- Number: 34

Youth career
- 2006–2011: AS Riarena
- 2011–2016: Locarno
- 2011–2013: → Bellinzona (loan)
- 2013–2016: → Lugano (loan)
- 2016–2018: Grasshopper

Senior career*
Years	Team	Apps	(Gls)
2018–2022	Grasshopper	80	(3)
2022–2025	Lugano	44	(1)
2024	→ Chicago Fire (loan)	28	(1)
2025–	Grasshopper	13	(0)

International career^{‡}
2016	Switzerland U18	1	(0)
2016	Switzerland U19	3	(0)
2018	Switzerland U20	1	(0)
- * Club domestic league appearances and goals as of 28 September 2026 ‡ National team caps and goals as of 01:55, 24 November 2021 (UTC)

Allan Arigoni (born 4 November 1998) is a Swiss professional footballer who plays as a right-back for Grasshopper Club Zurich in the Swiss Super League.

== Professional career ==
On 18 August 2017, Arigoni signed a professional contract with Grasshopper. Arigoni made his professional debut for Grasshopper in a 1-0 Swiss Super League win over FC Zürich on 25 February 2018. He stayed with the club following their relegation in 2019 and was instrumental to the club achieving promotion back to the top flight in 2021.

Back in the Swiss Super League, he was one of the few players who remained in the starting lineup from their promotion season. Despite this, following the 2021-22 season, he chose to not renew his contract with Grasshoppers. On 22 June 2022, he returned to his native Ticino, signing a three-year contract with cup champions FC Lugano.

Arigoni signed on a season-loan with Major League Soccer side Chicago Fire on 15 January 2024. He played 28 games in the regular season and scored one goal. The club did not qualify for the playoffs, and Chicago Fire announced on 22 October 2024 that they would not activate his option. He thus returned to Lugano on 1 January 2025.

On 30 June 2025, he returned to Grasshopper Club Zurich on a free transfer. He signs a two-year deal until 2027 with an option for a further year.

== International career ==
Arigoni was born in Zürich, Switzerland to a Ticinese father and a Jamaican mother. He is a youth international for Switzerland.
