= Nils Pédat =

Swiss footballer (born 2001)

Personal information
- Date of birth: 12 July 2001 (age 25)
- Place of birth: Switzerland
- Height: 1.85 m (6 ft 1 in)
- Position: Midfielder

Team information
- Current team: Stade Nyonnais
- Number: 7

Senior career*
Years	Team	Apps	(Gls)
2018–2019	Gland	1	(2)
2019–2020	Stade Nyonnais	8	(1)
2020–2022	Servette II	21	(14)
2021–2022	Servette	1	(0)
2022–	Stade Nyonnais	39	(4)
2025	→ Grand-Saconnex (loan)	14	

International career^{‡}
2015	Switzerland U15	2	(0)
- * Club domestic league appearances and goals as of 1 July 2025 ‡ National team caps and goals as of 24 September 2015

Nils Pédat (born 12 July 2001) is a Swiss professional footballer who plays as a midfielder for Stade Nyonnais.

== Career ==
Pédat began his senior career with Gland and Stade Nyonnais, before transferring to Servette in 2020. He made his professional debut with Servette in a 5–0 Swiss Super League loss to Basel on 18 April 2021. He signed his first professional contract with Servette on 2 July 2021.

== Personal life ==
Pédat is the son of the retired footballer Eric Pédat.
