= Grundenmoos =

Sports stadium in St. Gallen, Switzerland

Coordinates: 47.4104162°N 9.3024541°E

Gründenmoos
- Interactive map of Gründenmoos
- Location: St. Gallen, Switzerland
- Capacity: 4,500

Tenants
- FC St. Gallen, St Gallen Bears

Gründenmoos is a sport facility in St.Gallen, Switzerland. It is used mainly for football and American football is the training ground for St Gallen Bears American football club, FC St. Gallen and for FC Winkeln. The stadium has a capacity of 4,500. Since 1981 it is used for the CSIO Switzerland horse show jumping event.
