= Angelo Campos (Swiss footballer) =

Swiss footballer (born 2000)

Personal information
- Full name: Angelo Campos Oliveira
- Date of birth: 30 March 2000 (age 26)
- Place of birth: Chur, Switzerland
- Height: 1.80 m (5 ft 11 in)
- Position: Forward

Team information
- Current team: Schaffhausen
- Number: 17

Youth career
- 2009–2012: Chur 97
- 2012–2014: FC Grabs
- 2014–2019: St. Gallen

Senior career*
Years	Team	Apps	(Gls)
2019–2022	St. Gallen U21	32	(18)
2019–2022	St. Gallen	13	(0)
2021–2022	→ Brühl (loan)	30	(12)
2022–2023	Brühl	29	(24)
2023–2024	Xamax	23	(2)
2025	Brühl	16	(13)
2025–2026	Vaduz	25	(2)
2026–	Schaffhausen	8	(1)

International career
2015	Switzerland U16	2	(0)
- * Club domestic league appearances and goals as of 30 September 2026

Angelo Campos Oliveira (born 30 March 2000) is a Swiss professional footballer who plays as a forward for Promotion League club Schaffhausen.

== Club career ==
On 20 August 2021, he joined Brühl on a half-season loan.

On 14 June 2023, Campos signed with Xamax.

== Career statistics ==
=== Club ===
As of 1 July 2019

Appearances and goals by club, season and competition
Club	Season	League			Cup		Continental		Other		Total	
Club	Season	Division	Apps	Goals	Apps	Goals	Apps	Goals	Apps	Goals	Apps	Goals
St. Gallen U21	2017–18	1. Liga	4	0	0	0	–		0	0	4	0
St. Gallen U21	2018–19	1. Liga	15	10	0	0	–		0	0	15	10
St. Gallen U21	Total		19	10	0	0	0	0	0	0	19	10
St. Gallen	2018–19	Swiss Super League	3	0	0	0	–		0	0	3	0
Career total			22	10	0	0	0	0	0	0	22	10
