= Lorenzo González =

Spanish-born Swiss footballer (born 2000)

Personal information
- Full name: Lorenzo José González Montesdeoca
- Date of birth: 10 April 2000 (age 26)
- Place of birth: Las Palmas, Spain
- Height: 1.70 m (5 ft 7 in)
- Position: Forward

Team information
- Current team: Ceuta

Youth career
- 2005–2016: Servette
- 2016–2019: Manchester City

Senior career*
Years	Team	Apps	(Gls)
2019–2020	Málaga	6	(0)
2020–2022	St. Gallen	1	(0)
2021–2022	→ Ústí nad Labem (loan)	14	(1)
2022–	Ceuta	8	(0)

International career^{‡}
2014	Switzerland U15	6	(6)
2015	Switzerland U16	1	(2)
2016–2017	Switzerland U17	8	(4)
2018	Switzerland U18	2	(0)
2017–2019	Switzerland U19	11	(3)
2019	Switzerland U20	4	(0)
- * Club domestic league appearances and goals as of 30 October 2022 ‡ National team caps and goals as of 18 November 2019

Lorenzo José González Montesdeoca (born 10 April 2000) is a Swiss professional footballer who plays as a forward for Spanish club AD Ceuta FC.

== Club career ==
=== Manchester City ===
Born in Las Palmas, Canary Islands to a Spanish mother and a Swiss father, González moved to Geneva at early age and joined Servette FC's youth setup at the age of five. In July 2016, after reportedly attracting interest from Real Madrid and Manchester City, he signed a four-year contract with the latter.

After progressing through City's Academy, González made his senior debut with the under-21 squad on 25 September 2018, starting and scoring the second of a 4–1 EFL Trophy away defeat of Crewe Alexandra.

=== Málaga ===
On 2 September 2019, González signed for Málaga CF in Segunda División. He made his professional debut on 17 September, coming on as a second-half substitute for David Lombán in a 1–1 home draw against Rayo Vallecano. He totalled six appearances, starting one in a goalless draw with Sporting de Gijón at La Rosaleda Stadium on 29 September.

=== St. Gallen ===
On 24 January 2020, González signed for FC St. Gallen in Swiss Super League, accepting the league's minimum salary of €40,000 per half season. He played only once, as a 68th-minute substitute for Angelo Campos in a 2–1 win at former team Servette on 21 May 2021, the last day of his second season.

On 10 September 2021, González joined FK Ústí nad Labem on loan. He played 14 games in the Czech National Football League, scoring once in his second game on 17 September to open a 2–0 home win over FK Varnsdorf. He was released by St. Gallen on 23 June 2022.

=== Ceuta ===
In July 2022, González returned to Spain by signing for AD Ceuta FC in the third-tier Primera Federación.

== Career statistics ==
As of 24 January 2020

Club statistics
Club	Season	League			Cup		League Cup		Europe		Other		Total	
Club	Season	Division	Apps	Goals	Apps	Goals	Apps	Goals	Apps	Goals	Apps	Goals	Apps	Goals
Manchester City U21	2018–19	—									1 (Note: Appearances in EFL Trophy)	1	1	1
Málaga	2019–20	Segunda División	6	0	0	0	—		—		—		6	0
Career total			6	0	0	0	0	0	0	0	1	1	7	1
