= Hicham Mahou =

French footballer (born 1999)

Personal information
- Date of birth: 2 July 1999 (age 27)
- Place of birth: Nice, France
- Height: 1.77 m (5 ft 10 in)
- Position: Right winger

Team information
- Current team: Aberdeen
- Number: 14

Youth career
- 2006–2017: Nice

Senior career*
| Years | Team | Apps | (Gls) |
| 2016–2021 | Nice B | 77 | (11) |
| 2017–2021 | Nice | 6 | (0) |
| 2020 | → Red Star (loan) | 4 | (0) |
| 2021 | → Lausanne-Sport (loan) | 21 | (2) |
| 2021–2022 | Lausanne-Sport | 34 | (2) |
| 2022–2026 | Lugano | 84 | (3) |
| 2023–2024 | Lugano II | 2 | (0) |
| 2026– | Aberdeen | 0 | (0) |

International career^{‡}
| 2014–2015 | France U16 | 8 | (0) |
- * Club domestic league appearances and goals as of 17 May 2026 ‡ National team caps and goals as of 21 February 2021

Hicham Mahou (Arabic: هشام ماحو; born 2 July 1999) is a French professional footballer who plays as a right winger for Scottish Premiership side Aberdeen.

== Club career ==
Mahou made his professional debut for Nice in a 3–3 Ligue 1 draw against Lyon on 20 May 2017. In January 2020, he was loaned to Red Star until the end of the 2019–20 season.

On 9 September 2026, Mahou signed for Aberdeen.

== International career ==
Born in France, Mahou is of Moroccan descent. He is a youth international for France.

== Career statistics ==
As of 21 July 2020

Appearances and goals by club, season and competition
| Club | Season | League | | | National cup | | League cup | | Europe | | Other | | Total | |
| Club | Season | Division | Apps | Goals | Apps | Goals | Apps | Goals | Apps | Goals | Apps | Goals | Apps | Goals |
|---|---|---|---|---|---|---|---|---|---|---|---|---|---|---|
| Nice | 2016–17 | Ligue 1 | 1 | 0 | 1 | 0 | 0 | 0 | 1 | 0 | — | | 3 | 0 |
| Nice | 2017–18 | Ligue 1 | 3 | 0 | 1 | 0 | 0 | 0 | 0 | 0 | — | | 4 | 0 |
| Nice | 2018–19 | Ligue 1 | 0 | 0 | 0 | 0 | 1 | 0 | 0 | 0 | — | | 1 | 0 |
| Nice | Total | | 4 | 0 | 2 | 0 | 1 | 0 | 1 | 0 | — | | 8 | 0 |
| Red Star (loan) | 2019–20 | National | 4 | 0 | 0 | 0 | — | | — | | — | | 4 | 0 |
| Career total | | | 8 | 0 | 2 | 0 | 1 | 0 | 1 | 0 | 0 | 0 | 12 | 0 |
