= Boris Babić =

Swiss footballer (born 1997)

Personal information
- Date of birth: 10 November 1997 (age 29)
- Place of birth: Walenstadt, Switzerland
- Height: 1.80 m (5 ft 11 in)
- Position: Forward

Team information
- Current team: Schaffhausen
- Number: 18

Youth career
- FC Walenstadt
- FC Sargans
- FC Grabs
- St. Gallen

Senior career*
Years	Team	Apps	(Gls)
2014–2022	St. Gallen II	59	(22)
2016–2022	St. Gallen	68	(9)
2015–2016	→ Biel-Bienne (loan)	2	(0)
2018–2019	→ Vaduz (loan)	26	(0)
2022–2025	Lugano	37	(3)
2022–2025	Lugano II	22	(10)
2025–	Schaffhausen	22	(5)

International career^{‡}
2012	Switzerland U15	2	(1)
2012–2013	Switzerland U16	3	(1)
2014	Switzerland U17	7	(2)
2014–2015	Switzerland U18	9	(2)
2015–2016	Switzerland U19	6	(1)
2017	Switzerland U20	1	(0)
- * Club domestic league appearances and goals as of 30 September 2026 ‡ National team caps and goals as of 31 August 2017

Boris Babić (Serbian Cyrillic: Борис Бабић; born 10 November 1997) is a Swiss professional footballer who plays as a forward for Promotion League club Schaffhausen.

== Club career ==
Babić made his professional debut in the Swiss Super League for FC St. Gallen on 10 December 2016 in a game against FC Basel.

On 5 July 2022, Babić signed a three-year contract with Lugano. In 2025, he joined FC Schaffhausen on a permanent contract. He scored on his debut against FC Luzern U21.

== International career ==
Born in Switzerland, Babić is of Serbian descent. He participated in the 2014 UEFA European Under-17 Championship with the Switzerland national under-17 football team.

== Honours ==
FC Vaduz

- Liechtenstein Football Cup: 2017–18, 2018–19
