= Ousmane Doumbia =

Ivorian footballer

Personal information
- Date of birth: 21 May 1992 (age 34)
- Place of birth: Adjamé, Ivory Coast
- Height: 1.75 m (5 ft 9 in)
- Position: Midfielder

Team information
- Current team: Yverdon-Sport
- Number: 4

Senior career*
Years	Team	Apps	(Gls)
2012–2014	Athlétic Adjamé	20	(7)
2013–2014	→ Servette (loan)	28	(4)
2014–2016	Servette	60	(4)
2016–2017	Yverdon-Sport	6	(0)
2017–2020	Winterthur	96	(13)
2020–2022	Zürich	65	(0)
2022–2026	Lugano	87	(5)
2023	→ Chicago Fire (loan)	11	(0)
2026–	Yverdon-Sport	22	(0)
- * Club domestic league appearances and goals as of 28 September 2026

Ousmane Doumbia (born 21 May 1992) is an Ivorian professional footballer who plays as a midfielder for Swiss Challenge League club Yverdon-Sport.

== Career ==
Doumbia began his career with Athlétic Adjamé in the Ivory Coast, before moving to Switzerland with Servette. He spent his early career in the Swiss Challenge League with Servette and Winterthur.

On 10 October 2020, Doumbia signed a professional contract with FC Zürich. he made his professional debut with Zürich in a 1–0 Swiss Super League win over FC Basel on 4 November 2020.

On 13 June 2022, Doumbia joined Lugano on a four-year contract. On 28 June 2023, Doumbia joined Major League Soccer side Chicago Fire on loan for the remainder of their 2023 season.

On 21 January 2026, Doumbia returned to Yverdon-Sport on a one-and-a-half-year contract.

== Personal life ==
Doumbia is the brother of the Ivorian international footballer Seydou Doumbia.
