= 2008–09 FC Basel season =

FC Basel
2008–09 season
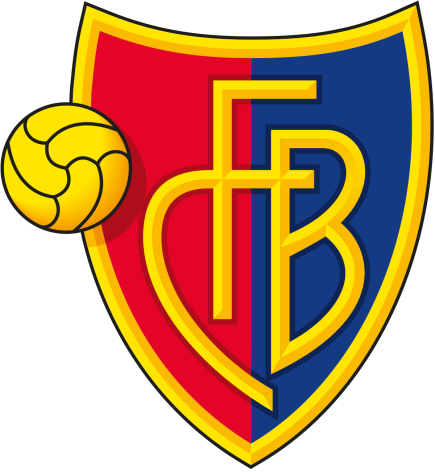
- Chairman: Gisela Oeri
- Manager: Christian Gross
- Swiss Super League: 3rd
- Swiss Cup: Semi-finals
- UEFA Champions League: Group stage
- Top goalscorer: League: Scott Chipperfield (12); All: Eren Derdiyok (14)
- Highest home attendance: 37,500 vs Barcelona (22 October 2008)
- Lowest home attendance: 15,730 vs Aarau (4 December 2008)

The 2008–09 FC Basel season began off with various pre-season matches against Swiss lower league teams, as well as against German Bundesliga, Ukrainian Vyscha Liha and Polish Ekstraklasa clubs. Basel's objectives for the year were to regain their Swiss Super League and Swiss Cup titles, as well as qualify for the UEFA Champions League.

== Overview ==
After last season, where Basel dominated on the domestic front, winning both the Swiss Super League and Swiss Cup, and reaching the last 32 of the UEFA Cup. They then had the opportunity to qualify for the Champions League. To prepare for the 2008–09 season, FCB added defenders Behrang Safari from Malmö FF and David Abraham from Gimnàstic de Tarragona and midfielders Jurgen Gjasula and Marcos Gelabert from FC St. Gallen.

In the other direction, fans' favourite Daniel Majstorović left the club for AEK Athens, while Kōji Nakata returned to Japan with Kashima Antlers; Vratislav Lokvenc and David Degen's respective loan deals were not re-newed. Prior to the start of the domestic season, Ivan Ergić resigned from the position as club captain and Franco Costanzo was unveiled as the new captain one day before the season began.

== The campaign ==
=== Domestic league ===
Basel were the defending champions and the club's priority aim for this season was to win the domestic league championship again. Basel played their opening game of the season in Bern on 18 July 2008 against Young Boys, which they won 2–1 through goals by substitutes Marko Perović and Benjamin Huggel after Eudis had put the home side ahead. With four wins and one draw, FC Aarau had the best start to the season and were in first place in the table for the first five match days. Basel then took the lead in the table after a 4–1 away win against Zürich. In the following weeks, Basel were able to maintain their lead, before Zürich took first place for the first time that season thanks to the better goal difference. On the 15th matchday, the top match between FCB and FCZ was played and ended with a 1–1 draw and so Basel could maintain its championship lead. On the next match day, however, Basel lost 2–0 against Xamax and since Zürich beat FC Sion 1–0, there was another change to first place. In the last game of the year there was an unexpected result when the bottom of the table Luzern beat Basel 5–1. As a result of this, Zürich were four points ahead of Basel and ten points ahead of third-placed YB winter champions.

In the first round after the winter break, the table leaders played 2–2 in the Zürich city derby against Grasshopper Club, but were still able to build their lead over Basel to five points, as the table runner-up lost 3–2 away against YB. However, this lead was reduced to two points on matchday 21 after FCB won the top game against FCZ 2–1. On the 23rd matchday, Zürich were long behind in the game against Luzern, but equalized five minutes before the end and were able to turn the game into a 3–1 win. In the following round, the YB were defeated 1–3 in Vaduz and thus lost the connection to the top of the table. On the 25th matchday, FCB took the lead in the table. Zürich lost 4–2 in Bern, while Basel beat Vaduz 5–0 at home in the St. Jakob-Park. On the next match day, FCZ regained the top of the table after a 2–1 win against Aarau and because FCB only played 1–1 in Bellinzona. FCB won 3–2 in against Xamax and benefited from the fact that FCT could only draw against Sion and thus FCB took the lead in the table. On matchday 29, the leaders FCB did not get beyond a draw against Bellinzona and because FCZ won their game in Aarau 3–0, they were able to move up to first place. On matchday 32, none of the first three teams won their game: FCZ did not get more than 1–1 against Luzern, but was able to extend their lead to four points because FCB lost 3–1 in Aarau, contrary to all expectations. The following round, the top match between FCZ and FCB took place, which Basel won 3–1 and thus they moved within one point to Zürich. Basel lost 4–1 GC, Zürich won 1–0 in Bellinzona and won the championship. The play-off slot went to Luzern, who lost 5–2 in Bern, while Sion won 5–1 in Vaduz and thus were able to secure their place in the league.

=== Swiss Cup ===
The 2008–09 Swiss Cup was the 84th season of Switzerland's annual cup competition. It began on 20 September with the first games of Round 1 and ended on 20 May 2009 with the Final held at Stade de Suisse, Bern. The winners earned a place in the play-off round of the UEFA Europa League. FC Basel were the defending champions. Nine Super League teams (FC Vaduz are from Liechtenstein and thus play in the Liechtenstein Cup 2008–09) and all sixteen Challenge League clubs entered this year's competition, as well as thirteen teams from 1. Liga and 26 teams from lower leagues. Teams from both the Super League and Challenge League were seeded in the first round and the teams from the Super League were seeded in the second round. In the first three rounds, the home advantage was granted to the team from the lower league, if applicable.

Schötz

Basel were drawn against third tier FC Schötz. Basel head coach Christian Gross gave most of his regular rest, including goalkeeper and captain Franco Costanzo and played with a reserve team. Marco Streller returned into the team after a groin operation. Basel controlled the game, but in the first half did not create many chances and so the score was goalless at half-time. Basel played with more speed and higher pressure after the break. They created chances but it wasn't until the 79th minute before they scored that Orhan Mustafi pushed in his shot from the 5 yard box after a cross from Eduardo Rubio. Schötz then reacted and had three chances to equalise, but two shots went well wide and reserve keeper Oliver Stöckli saved the other. Basel's 1–0 win was hard earned.

Bulle

In the second round Basel were drawn against third tier FC Bulle. The game at the Stade de Bouleyres was played on 17 October in front of 4,600 spectators. Basel started the game concentrated and put the hosts under pressure from the beginning. After a few chances, in the 14th minute Marko Perović put in a hard cross so close to the near post that goalkeeper Chassot couldn't help but knock the ball over the goal line. After taking the lead, Basel kept up the pressure and Eduardo Rubio doubled up two minutes later. FCB then controlled the game without trying too hard, the outsiders tried to react and created a few chances. Suddenly this worked out and Barnabo pulled a goal back in the 27th minute after a solo dribbling and good long-range shot. Then, in the second half Basel increased the tempo. Reto Zanni on the right wing with a good cross to Marco Streller, who pushed the ball in, played 57 minutes. Bulle showed a reaction, but their goal a few minutes later was an off-side effort and disallowed. Basel had a few more chances and, in the overtime, Jurgen Gjasula scored the last goal of the match to make it 4–1 for the favourites.

Thun

In round three, played on 22 November, FCB was drawn against second tier FC Thun, who hosted the game in the Stadion Lachen in front of 3,550 spectators. Basel took control of the game from the start, and youngster Eren Derdiyok put the guests one goal in advance after 22 minutes and he doubled this up eight minutes later. After the hour Derdiyok completed his hat-trick. Soon after the third goal head coach Christian Gross substituted his goal scorer out, replacing him with Orhan Mustafi. Gross also brought in Jurgen Gjasula, who scored the final goal of the game to give the visitors a 4–0 victory.

Zürich

The quarter-finals were played in Spring 2009. In the round of the last eight FCZ were matched at home in the Letzigrund against FCB on Wednesday 18 March. The match saw both teams have a good start, they neutralized each other before the penalty box. Zürich took control of the match before half time. In the 23rd minute good positional play by Adrian Nikçi, who outwitted the defense, but then only hit the post. Basel created the better chances after the break. In the 48th minute Andrea Guatelli safely parried a shot from 15 meters from Ivan Ergić. In the 51st minute a header from Marco Streller was also held by the keeper. After a foul on Streller in the 66th minute referee Cyril Zimmermann awarded a penalty for Basel, which Benjamin Huggel converted on the top right-hand corner. Basel controlled the game, leaving FCZ with only one further goal chance. After a foul by Huggel with 5 minutes left to play, Almen Abdi took the free kick from about 18 meters, centrally in front of the goal, but he shoots far over it. Then, free kick for Basel from a good central position, Carlitos places the free kick on the crossbar. Game over, one goal was enough, 1–0 for FCB.

Young Boys

The semi-final between Young Boys and FCB took place on Thursday 16 April. Both teams started enthusiastically in the with 31,120 spectators sold-out Stade de Suisse. After a few minutes, Thomas Häberli had a possibility with his head, but he was offside. YB put on the pressure mainly on the right through Carlos Varela and Christian Schwegler. However, the decisive last pass was always imprecise, so that no great chances arose. Before the break, two scenes occurred in front of both goals. Scott Chipperfields shot was thwarted by Marco Wölfli with a good save (38). On the other side, Häberli was held back briefly, referee Bertolini decided on penalty. But Basel's goalkeeper and captain Franco Costanzo saved the penalty kicked by Mario Raimondi (45). The course of the game hardly changed after the break. YB had a lot of possession, but the guests were also often in front of the goal. In the 30-minute "extra time", YB looked fresher, but no goals fell. It came to a penalty shoot-out. Here YB goalie Marco Wölfli became the hero. He saved Huggel, David Abraham and Jurgen Gjasula's penalties. Gilles Yapi Yapo, Felix Bastians and Marco Schneuwly all scored for YB and they reached the Cup final.

Conclusion

Basel's aim for the Swiss Cup was to retain the title and this was not achieved, but the qualification for the semi-final was a good result.

=== Champions League ===
IFK Göteborg

Basel entered the Champions League in the Second Qualifying Round and were drawn against IFK Göteborg of Sweden. The first leg was on 30 July 2008 at Ullevi. After the first 90 minutes it was an advantage for FC Basel 1893 because the Swiss champions scored an away goal in holding IFK Göteborg to a 1–1 draw in Sweden. Benjamin Huggel scored for Basel, breaking the deadlock after 26 minutes, as he struck with a back-post header following Jürgen Gjasula's corner. However, the lead was only short as Jakob Johansson set up Thomas Olsson to restore parity just six minutes later. IFK were then played forwards but could not find a second goal. Likewise Basel had nothing to show for their late pressure as David Abraham, Gjasula and Huggel failed to net the ball with their chances, the end score remained 1–1.

Return match

The second leg took place on 6 August at St. Jakob-Park. Göteborg started into the game fastest and having come close to scoring within a few seconds, they soon had the goal that they needed to remain in the fixture as in the 19th minute Pontus Wernbloom finished off a fast counterattack. This shook Basel to life and Benjamin Huggel, the man who put them ahead last week in Gothenburg, managed the same feat again as he headed in a Jürgen Gjasula corner. The only player who was added to Basel's starting lineup compared to the first leg was Valentin Stocker and he nearly scored the home team's second, but Göteborg's goalkeeper Kim Christensen was able to smother the effort. Although after the interval Basel maintained the pressure, Göteborg scored the second goal and this again came following a quickly played break. It was finished off by Robin Söder after Basel goalkeeper and captain Franco Costanzo could only knock the first attempt to the side. Now Basel required two goals to overturn Göteborg's away-goals advantage. They achieved the first with 19 minutes left to play as Scott Chipperfield stretched himself to put home an Eren Derdiyok cross. The home supporters sensed the chance as Basel were awarded a penalty for a handball with just six minutes left to play. Ivan Ergić made no mistakes with the spot kick and it was he who, in the added injury time, out played two Göteborg defenders to settle the match 4–2.

Vitória de Guimarães

Basel then faced Vitória SC of the Portuguese Liga in the third qualifying round at Estádio D. Afonso Henriques in Guimarães. Having already played five league games and the first two qualifiers, Basel had quickly found their rhythm and attempted to force the pace from the beginning, both Valentin Stocker and Ivan Ergić went close to goal in the opening minutes of the first half. Stocker had had the first chance at goal after eight minutes. With a neat pass coming from Basel's Portuguese midfielder Carlitos who set up the chance for his team-mate, but Stocker fired left footed just beyond the post. Ergić also had a good chance, but this also went wide. Basel played neatly and waited for counterattack opportunities, this although they nearly got caught out twice in quick succession. First Marquinho volleyed just off-target after 30 minutes and minutes later he sent a header towards the goal but this drew a comfortable save from goalkeeper Franco Constanzo. Basel pushed forward. Stocker had a good chance. Carlitos also tried his luck with a good shot from long range and Ergić produced a header after a corner, which was shortly before half-time. As the second half got underway, Eren Derdiyok came close to scoring for Basel with a left-foot shot. Stocker also had another good chance. Then, at the other end, a number of Guimarães strikers were unable to finish off a right-wing cross and eventually the ball was cleared. The home team were unable to outwit the stubborn and hard Basel defence, not even after coach Manuel Cajuda brought in two new strikers in an attempt to strengthen the attacking force in the second half. The game ended goalless.

Return match

The second leg was played on 27 August at St. Jakob-Park. Basel immediately took the initiative and pushed forward. As an early fine passing move unlocked the Guimarães defence, Ivan Ergić's final pass found Valentin Stocker, who put the hosts one up after 11 minutes. However, the Portuguese team were soon back on level terms. Not even four minutes later they achieved a potentially decisive away goal as Fajardo put home from the penalty spot, following François Marque's foul on João Alves. Basel created good opportunities through Marcos Gelabert and Eren Derdiyok and even if they had more possession and even if they were the stronger attacking team for the rest of the half, their efforts were all in vain because the hard-working Guimarães defence held tight. After the restart Manuel Cajuda's team came out as the more adventurous side. First Yves Desmarets was well-placed and he sent a hard shot narrowly wide of goalkeeper Franco Costanzo's left-hand post. The Basel defence caused further concern just a few moments and let João Alves free and he directed a dangerous header on target. Realising their danger, Basel then woke up and increased the pressure in their game on Guimarães. Stocker's shot was close and Derdiyok's shot went wide. Their forcing tempo then paid off as Stocker pushed a pass to his striker partner Derdiyok and he fired his shot low, beyond Nilson. Because they were a goal behind, Guimarães were forced to do the pressing, but as they equalised for a second time, through substitute Roberto Calmon Félix with just three minutes left, he was ruled offside by referee Pieter Vink and his linesman. FCB held on to their 2–1 lead and secured their qualification to the tournament's group stages.

Group stage

Basel's hopes for their international season dropped somewhat because they were drawn into a strong Group C alongside Barcelona, Sporting CP and Shakhtar Donetsk. Barça were one of the favorites to win the trophy, and Basel had bad memories of the Sporting team, who had knocked them out of the 2007–08 UEFA Cup knockout stage this year in February. As third opponents Shakhtar had won the Ukrainian double (league and Cup) the previous season. Nevethless coach Christian Gross stated that remaining in Europe over the winter break was their aim. This meant at least third position in the group, which would see then continue in the 2008–09 UEFA Cup.

Shakhtar

Basel played their opening game of the group stage at St. Jakob-Park on 16 September against Shakhtar. Being urged on by the loud vocal chants from the supporters massed behind Captain Franco Costanzo's goal, Basel pressed forward promisingly from the start. Striker Eren Derdiyok, returning first time after suffering a thigh injury, almost turned the early pressure positive, but he hit an early header just wide. Shakhtar's coach Mircea Lucescu had promised his team would go out to play for the victory. After Basel's early enthusiasm had worn off, the visitors became the more menacing and Jádson, one of five Brazilians in the starting eleven, proved a constant concern for the Basel defence. On 16 minutes the playmaker rushed down the right and supplied a cross, which Luiz Adriano narrowly failed to turn goalwards. Although it was the quick passing moves which threatened to open up the home defence more than once, it was to be that the set-pieces that would ultimately prove their undoing. Fernandinho sent one long-range effort fly over the bar. Basel central defender François Marque with a clumsy challenge on Luiz Adriano about thirty metres out, allowed the deep-lying playmaker Fernandinho another chance. His kick was still rising upwards as it passed keeper Costanzo for the first goal. Basel's game was only occasional as Shakhtar dominated the first half. They were rewarded for the efforts with the second goal in the added time of the half. Right back Reto Zanni committed a handball and Jádson struck a hard free-kick which was missed by everybody as it arced in to the right-hand corner of Costanzo's net. Basel coach Christian Gross reacted to the team's problems at half-time and took out Derdiyok and Valentin Stocker. Their replacements Orhan Mustafi and Eduardo made an immediate impact. After just four minutes in the second half Mustafi forced Shakhtar keeper Andriy Pyatov to his first save with an angled drive. Then Carlitos's smart pass gave Eduardo his first chance, but he shot wide of Pyatov's right-hand post. Because of their two-goal lead, Shakhtar controlled the game and were less adventurous than they had been before. Yet the Ukrainian champions nearly hit a third after 66 minutes. Basel left-back Ronny Hodel was overwhelmed by the speed of the break and Luiz Adriano ran clear of him into the open space and passed to Brandão in the box. Costanzo saved the Brazilian's first effort and then reacted superbly to fiercely-struck follow-up from Vyacheslav Shevchuk on to a post. David Abraham scored a late consolation goal for the home team.

Sporting CP

Sporting Clube de Portugal were the opponents on Matchday 2, played in the Estádio José Alvalade on 1 October. The home team started well, played forwards and Derlei proved he was a dangerous striker. But Basel were soon in the game, Jürgen Gjasula made space for himself, but his early shot but failed to be dangerous for Rui Patrício. Not long afterwards Tonel was forced to make a desperate clearance so that Marco Streller did not have a clear run at goal. The hosts were putting more pressure on, but Basel had the first clear-cut chance threw defender David Abraham. The Argentinian centre-back was given plenty of time and space to take on Streller's pass, but his shot went wide. Derlei had the next chance but failed to control the ball. Sporting had two better chances before half-time, through Leandro Romagnoli and Fábio Rochemback. After 49 minutes Derlei almost broke the deadlock, but he headed João Moutinho's acrobatic overhead cross against the post. But ten minutes after half time the Basel defenders beat themselves with a bizarre own-goal. Abraham attempted to clear under pressure struck the ball hard, but it hit Reto Zanni and looped back behind goalkeeper Franco Costanzo into the net. Two minutes later Romagnoli almost increased the lead, but the keeper fisted his powerful shot into the out. Basel reacted, but Benjamin Huggel was denied the equaliser as Rui Patrício made a sprawling save. The goalie was then forced by Gjasula's free-kick to tip the ball over the top. In the last minutes Sporting exploited the extra space that the forward moving visitors were leaving behind them. First Derlei was unlucky with a header, again being denied by the post. He then had an effort ruled out for offside by Italian referee Nicola Rizzoli and his linesman, but he found his efforts rewarded as he netted the 86th minute. Despite defending well and causing a few scares at the other end of the park, Basel were defeated 2–0.

Barcelona

In advance to game on matchday 3 at St. Jakob-Park against Barcelona on 22 October, it was suggested that Basel were the more ambitious side, because head coach Christian Gross lined up both Marco Streller and Eren Derdiyok in the attack. Gross had said he had trimmed his defence and would not like to see his side go one down in the opening stage. On the other side Josep Guardiola put his stars Samuel Eto'o, Andrés Iniesta and Thierry Henry on the bench. These suggestions were soon disproved as Lionel Messi played a double pass with Dani Alves and ran on to the Brazilian's chipped return pass to tip the ball in from the edge of the six-yard box. The home side recovered from that crushing blow, but suddenly found themselves two goals behind. Xavi passed to Sergio Busquets on the right and the midfielder drove the ball between goalkeeper Franco Costanzo’s legs. The Basel keeper then denied Xavi's effort a few minutes later. But Barça continued their pressing and scored as Bojan Krkić created himself space and hammered his shot into the lower left corner after 22 minutes. The Basel defence blocked a further Krkić shot and keeper Costanzo reacted well as Alves followed-up. Basel could have been four down before the first half-hour had been played. Head coach Gross took out Eduardo Rubio after the break, he brought Valentin Stocker, but within 60 seconds of the restart Costanzo was beaten again as Krkić finished off a quick played counterattack with his hard shot. Only two minutes later, Alexander Hleb and Messi combined to supply Xavi who netted the fifth. At the other end, Streller eventually had a shot at Víctor Valdés's goal as he outran Carles Puyol and hammered a right foot shot, but it was swept away. Basel created another few chances through Derdiyok, Stocker and Streller but couldn't realise and lost 0–5.

Barcelona

The return game against Barcelona in the Camp Nou was on 4 November in front of 49,000 spectators. Home team coach Josep Guardiola left Lionel Messi, Xavi and Samuel Eto'o on the bench and, therefore, much was expected from Andrés Iniesta and, luckily for Barça he was on form on the day, ready to run and with a good eye. He linked-up well with Thierry Henry and created two good chances for the Frenchman, the first of which was arched narrowly beyond keeper Franco Costanzo's left-hand post. Then Iniesta himself had the next chance and he produced a low drive, but the keeper matched the chance. Costanzo and central defender François Marque both played a good game. Barça missed another opportunity to take the lead before half-time, as Sylvinho delivered a free-kick which Henry met with a header in towards the top corner of the goal but Costanzo matched this chance too. Again, after the break the Argentinian keeper confirmed his credits as Henry passed the ball into space in front of Bojan Krkić, who was able to run clear, but Costanzo was able to block the chance with his feet. Guardiola was unhappy with his team and so brought on Xavi and Messi and they rewarded him within two minutes. Messi caught a loose ball and burst forward, played a one-two with Henry and slotted the ball home into the bottom corner of the net. This was Messi's fourth Champions League goal in as many matches. Xavi also made an impact, he forced yet another save from Costanzo with a free-kick. Iniesta was forced out with an injury to his right thigh in the 67th minute. Gerard Piqué also played two good set-pieces, but instead the second goal of the match came at the other end. Carlitos swang in a right-wing cross directly to Eren Derdiyok who smashed a volley past Victor Valdés to the 1–1 end score.

Shakhtar

The return game against Shakhtar Donetsk in the stadium RSK Olimpiyskyi was on 26 November. Due to the absence of centre-back Dmytro Chyhrynskyi and right-winger Ilsinho through injury, plus suspended striker Brandão, home coach Mircea Lucescu had to make changes in his team. Luiz Adriano played as middle striker and he was aided by Willian, Jádson and Fernandinho. That latter pair combined well and they nearly opened the scoring during the first five minutes. First, Jadson swept a ball wide, then Fernandinho's attempt was pushed over the bar by goalkeeper and captain Franco Costanzo. Basel had trouble starting into the game, finding it difficult to get a hold on the pitch, which was soggy and heavy following the heavy rain earlier in the day. Striker Eren Derdiyok didn't see much of the ball in the early minutes. Nevertheless, Costanzo had to remain concentrated and he dealt well following a fierce free-kick by Darijo Srna. Willian then took a shot that went wide. After about half-hour, Basel seemed to have sorted their problems out and were into the game. Then Shakhtar struck. Tomáš Hübschman sent in a cross from the left, which Oleksiy Gai controlled the ball and played back to Jadson, who rushed into the box to push the ball home. Shakhtar goalkeeper Andriy Pyatov saved an Eduardo effort just before half-time. Both teams started fast into the second half, Valentin Stocker had his shot blocked on the line, and at the other end Fernandinho also had his effort cleared off the line. Five minutes into the second half, Willian doubled the score, coming from the left-hand touchline, swerved around several defenders before arching the ball inside the far post, despite Costanzo's desperate dive. The visitors replied and pushed and worried the Shakhtar defence, but suddenly were three down. A quick played counterattack, William sent Srna down the left and his cross was pushed home at the far post by Jadson. The Brazilian completed his hat-trick seven minutes later, Willian crossed from the left Jadson finished off. Ukrainian international Yevhen Seleznyov with a left-footed shot from just inside the box in the 75th minute gave the game its final 50 score line.

Sporting CP

Matchday 6 in the St. Jakob-Park on 9 December against Sporting CP was Basel's last game in their journey through European competition for this season. The home team had the greater share of possession in the opening. Sporting striker Derlei had the first chance, though, with an early shot across goal at the end of a swift counterattack. While Basel continued to play neatly, but that without carrying out much threat to the Sporting goal, the speed with which the visitors could turn defence into attack was menacing. A measured ball found Yannick Djaló racing clear, and though his cross was met by a powerful header from the again unmarked Derlei, Franco Costanzo parried this. João Moutinho then flashed a shot just over, and Sporting finally made the breakthrough on 19 minutes. Marat Izmailov's low cross from the right hand side was turned in from point-blank range by the quickly onrushing Djaló. The early goal and torrential rain that fell during the entire match failed to dampen the enthusiasm of the Basel fans, who could have been celebrating only a third goal in the section for their side when Fábio Rochemback lost possession to present Benjamin Huggel with a shooting chance, but the midfielder sent a fierce shot just wide of the goal. Ivan Ergić did find the target soon after, but his drive lacked sufficient power to trouble goalkeeper Tiago, while Djaló may have scored a second, had his stand foot not slipped after he had cleverly created space inside the box. The half-time introduction of Valentin Stocker gave Basel increased power down the left wing and, seconds after the restart, an early cross from him led to Marco Streller shooting wide of the goal. Huggel again tested goalkeeper Tiago as the hosts sought for the equaliser. Sporting were clearly content to let the waves of pressure break on their back four, and play their counterattacks with pace. Djaló tried a number of stepovers, as he tried to tease center back Beg Ferati on the left, but despite getting round the Basel defender, his cross saw the diminutive Moutinho comfortably outmuscled by Basel's other center back François Marque. Stocker's direct approach won a corner, which he took himself, but the high soaring Ergić headed over the goal. However, Djaló miscued his shot when Marco Caneira's cross found him with lots of space just inside the penalty box. Fabien Frei eventually brought a save out of Tiago with a low drive 16 minutes from time, while Stocker forced the goalkeeper into two stops in quick succession. The final score 0–1 meant the end of Basel's journey through the European competition for this season.

== Club ==
=== Management ===
Position	Staff
Manager	(Switzerland) Christian Gross
Assistant manager	(Switzerland) Fritz Schmid until 13 January 2009
Conditioning Coach	(Switzerland) Marco Walker from 16 January 2009
Fitness Coach	(Switzerland) Thomas Grüter
Fitness Coach	(Switzerland) Romain Crevoisier
Youth Team Coach	(Switzerland) Patrick Rahmen
Youth Team Co-Coach	(Switzerland) Sandro Kamber

Last updated: 17 May 2008

=== Kit ===
Supplier: Nike
Sponsor(s): Novartis

Home	Away

Source: Official Site

=== Other information ===
Chairman	(Switzerland) Mrs Gisela Oeri
Vice Chairman	(Switzerland) Mr Bernhard Heusler
Ground (capacity and dimensions)	St. Jakob-Park (42,500 / 120x80 m)

Source: Official Site

== Players ==
=== First team squad ===
The following is the list of the Basel first team squad. It also includes players that were in the squad the day the season started on 18 July 2008, but subsequently left the club after that date.

As of 30 June 2009, accounting for official transfers: Note: Flags indicate national team as defined under FIFA eligibility rules; some limited exceptions apply. Players may hold more than one non-FIFA nationality.

No.	Pos.	Nation	Player
1	GK	ARG	Franco Costanzo (Captain)
3	DF	SUI	Ronny Hodel
4	DF	SUI	Michel Morganella
6	MF	ARG	Marcos Gelabert
7	MF	GER	Jurgen Gjasula
8	MF	SUI	Benjamin Huggel (Vice-captain)
9	FW	SUI	Marco Streller
10	MF	SRB	Marko Perović
11	MF	AUS	Scott Chipperfield
14	MF	SUI	Valentin Stocker
15	FW	ARG	Federico Almerares
16	MF	SUI	Fabian Frei
17	FW	CHI	Eduardo Rubio
19	DF	ARG	David Abraham

No.	Pos.	Nation	Player
20	DF	SWE	Behrang Safari
21	DF	FRA	François Marque
22	MF	SRB	Ivan Ergić
23	FW	BRA	Eduardo
25	GK	SUI	Jayson Leutwiler
26	MF	SUI	Daniel Unal
27	GK	SUI	Yann Sommer
28	DF	SUI	Beg Ferati
29	FW	SUI	Orhan Mustafi
30	MF	POR	Carlitos
31	FW	SUI	Eren Derdiyok
32	DF	SUI	Reto Zanni (Vice-captain)
33	DF	TUR	Serkan Şahin
35	GK	SUI	Oliver Stöckli

==== Multiple nationalities ====
- 1 (Argentina) (Italy) Franco Costanzo
- 7 (Germany) (Albania) Jurgen Gjasula
- 11 (Australia) (Switzerland) Scott Chipperfield
- 13 (Switzerland) (Turkey) Daniel Unal
- 15 (Argentina) (Italy) Federico Almerares
- 17 (Chile) (Germany) Eduardo Rubio
- 20 (Sweden) (Iran) Behrang Safari
- 22 (Serbia) (Australia) Ivan Ergić
- 28 (Switzerland) (Kosovo) Beg Ferati
- 29 (North Macedonia) (Albania) (Switzerland) Orhan Mustafi
- 31 (Switzerland) (Turkey) Eren Derdiyok
- 33 (Turkey) (Switzerland) Serkan Şahin

=== Summer transfers ===
==== In ====
5	MF	GER	Jurgen Gjasula (from FC St. Gallen – free transfer)
6	MF	ARG	Marcos Gelabert (from FC St. Gallen – 644.000 SFr)
10	MF	SRB	Marko Perović (from Red Star Belgrade – 1.288.000 SFr)
13	MF	SUI	Daniel Unal (from AS Roma)
15	FW	ARG	Federico Almerares (from River Plate)
17	FW	CHI	Eduardo Rubio (loan from Cruz Azul with buy-out option)
17	DF	SUI	Patrik Baumann (loan return from FC Concordia Basel)
19	DF	ARG	David Abraham (from Gimnàstic de Tarragona)
20	DF	SWE	Behrang Safari (from Malmö FF – 644.000 SFr)
25	FW	MKD	Orhan Mustafi (from FC Zürich – free transfer)
26	MF	SUI	Pascal Schürpf (from Basel U-21)
33	MF	SUI	Samet Gündüz (from Basel U-21)
35	GK	SUI	Oliver Stöckli (free transfer)

==== Out ====
5	DF	SWE	Daniel Majstorović (to AEK Athens)
6	DF	JPN	Kōji Nakata (to Kashima Antlers)
7	MF	SUI	David Degen (loan return to Borussia Mönchengladbach)
12	MF	SEN	Papa Malick Ba (contract not re-newed)
15	MF	LIE	Franz Burgmeier (Mutual Consent)
18	GK	LBR	Louis Crayton (to D.C. United)
19	FW	CZE	Vratislav Lokvenc (loan return to Red Bull Salzburg)
29	MF	SUI	Simone Grippo (to Chievo)

==== Out on loan ====
24	MF	SUI	Cabral (on loan to Sevilla)
33	MF	SUI	Samet Gündüz (on loan to FC Wil)
--	DF	SUI	Dominik Ritter (on loan to Concordia Basel)
--	DF	SUI	Patrik Baumann (on loan to Concordia Basel)
--	GK	SUI	Yann Sommer (on loan to FC Vaduz)

=== Winter transfers ===
==== In ====
27	GK	SUI	Yann Sommer (from FC Vaduz – loan return)
33	DF	TUR	Serkan Şahin (from Basel U-21)
-	MF	SUI	Xherdan Shaqiri (from Basel U-21)

==== Out ====
4	DF	SUI	Michel Morganella (to Palermo)

==== Out on loan ====
27	MF	SUI	Pascal Schürpf (on loan to Concordia Basel)
33	MF	SUI	Samet Gündüz (on loan to Concordia Basel)
--	DF	SUI	Sabri Boumelaha (on loan to Concordia Basel)

=== Starting 11 ===
No.	Pos.	Nat.	Name	MS	Notes
1	GK	(Argentina)	Costanzo	28	
20	LB	(Sweden)	Safari	34	
21	CB	(France)	Marque	22	
19	CB	(Argentina)	Abraham	33	
32	RB	(Switzerland)	Zanni	32	
8	DM	(Switzerland)	Huggel	33	
14	LW	(Switzerland)	Stocker	32	
11	CM	(Australia)	Chipperfield	24	
22	CM	(Serbia)	Ergić	30	
30	RW	(Portugal)	Carlitos	22	
31	FW	(Switzerland)	Derdiyok	25	

Last updated: 20 November 2008
Source: Squad stats and Start formations.
Only competitive matches.
Using the most used start formation.
Ordered by position on pitch (from back right to front left).

=== Overall ===
Basel participated in the following major competitions: the Swiss Super League, the Swiss Cup and the UEFA Champions League.

Competition	Started round	Final position / round	First match	Last match
Swiss Super League	—	3rd	18 July 2008	29 May 2009
Swiss Cup	Round 1	Semi-final	20 September 2008	13 April 2009
UEFA Champions League	Second qualifying round	2008–09 UEFA Champions League Group stage	30 July 2008	9 December 2008

Source: Competitions

== Results and fixtures ==
=== Friendly matches ===
==== Pre-season friendlies ====
24 June 2008 Pre-season	Basel	3–1	Lugano	San Gian, Celerina
17:30	Ergić 19' (1:0); Burgmeier 21' (2:0); Carlitos 81' (3:1)	Summary	59' (2:1) Rocca	Attendance: 720; Referee: (Switzerland) Patrick Collet (Riom/GR)

28 June 2008 Pre-season	Wil	1–2	Basel	Bergholz, Wil
17:30	Tsimba 82' (1:)	Summary	33' (0:1) Ergić; 90' (1:2) Boumelaha	Attendance: 900; Referee: Marco Speranda (Hergiswil)

2 July 2008 Pre-season	BSC Old Boys	1–3	Basel	Stadion Schützenmatte, Basel
19:00	Boukaakiou 64' (1:2)	Summary	44' (0:1) Carlitos; 57' (0:2) Ergić; 75' (1:3) Mustafi	Attendance: 2,218; Referee: Sascha Amhof

5 July 2008 Pre-season	Basel	2–3	Shakhtar Donetsk	Stadion Schützenmatte, Basel
18:00	Stocker 32' (1:2); Ergić 36' (2:2)	Summary	15' (pen. 0:1) Fernandinho; 27' (0:2) Hladkyy; 53' (2:3) Seleznyov	Attendance: 1,500; Referee: Pascal Erlachner

==== Uhrencup ====
The Uhrencup is a friendly club football tournament, held annually in Grenchen. It is Europe's most traditional club football tournament.

10 July 2008 Uhrencup; Round 1	Basel	6–1	Legia Warsaw	Stadion Brühl, Grenchen
20:45	Gjasula 15' (1:0); Marque (yellow card) 21'; Carlitos 44' (2:0); Carlitos 56' (3:0); Schürpf 67' (4:1); Mustafi 85' (5:1); Mustafi 89' (6:1)	Summary	(yellow card) 19' Borysiuk; 66' (pen. 3:1) Iwański	Attendance: 6,791; Referee: Nicole Petignat

8 July 2008 Uhrencup; Round 2	Basel	2–2	Borussia Dortmund	Stadion Brühl, Grenchen
19:30	Santana 19' (o.g. 1:0); Gjasula 65' (2:1)	Summary	34' (1:1) Kehl; 85' (2:2) Valdez	Attendance: 8,094; Referee: Claudio Circhetta

==== Pre-season/First half of season friendlies ====
15 July 2008 Pre-season	FC Oberdorf	1–7	Basel	Stadion z’Hof, Oberdorf
18:30	Wahl 87' (pen. 1:6)	Summary	29' (0:1) Derdiyok; 36' (0:2) Carlitos; 45' (0:3) Derdiyok; 70' (0:4) Stocker; 78' (0:5) Mustafi; 86' (0:6) Mustafi; 91' (1:7) Gjasula	Attendance: 2,300; Referee: Reto Lanfranchi (Reinach)

9 September 2008 Mid-season	SV Muttenz	0–5	Basel	Sportplatz Margelacker, Muttenz
19:30		Summary	1' (0:1) Abraham; 26' (0:2) Gjasula; 51' (0:3) Eduardo; 81' (0:4) Almerares; 87' (0:5) Almerares	Attendance: 1,220; Referee: Daniel Wermelinger

14 October 2008 Mid-season	Concordia Basel	3–3	Basel	Stadion Rankhof, Basel
14:00	Bieli 59' (1:2); Mathys 83' (2:2); Schweizer 92' (3:2)	Summary	51' (0:1) Mustafi; 57' (0:2) Mustafi; 93' (3:3) Almerares	Attendance: 400; Referee: Jan Fluri (Ettingen)

==== Winter break/Second half of season friendlies ====
15 January 2009 Winter break	Concordia Basel	4–3	Basel	Stadion Schützenmatte, Basel
12:00	Bieli 39' (1:1); Tcheutchoua 59' (2:3); Bieli 62' (pen. 3:3); Mathys 76' (4:3)	Summary	31' (0:1) Gelabert; 49' (1:2) Mustafi; 50' (1:3) Chipperfield	Attendance: 200; Referee: Alain Bieri (Solothurn)

17 January 2009 Winter break	Basel	3–2	Solothurn	Stadion Schützenmatte, Basel
14:30	Ferati 50' (1:2); Derdiyok 54' (2:2); Almerares 68' (3:2)	Summary	31' (0:1) da Costa; 49' (0:2) Kalina	Attendance: 500; Referee: Reto Walker

22 January 2009 Training camp	Basel	4–0	Tianjin Teda	Sportplatz La Manga, La Manga
16:00	F. Frei 18' (1:0); F. Frei 53' (2:0); Derdiyok 62' (3:0); Stocker 88' (4:0); (yellow card) 86' Gelabert	Summary		Attendance: 50; Referee: Francisco Gomez Liarte (Murcia)

25 January 2009 Training camp	Basel	1–1	Wisła Kraków	Municipal Manolo Maciá, Santa Pola
16:00	Derdiyok 19' (1:0)	Summary	88' (1:1) Cléber	Attendance: 150; Referee: Francisco Gomez Liarte

28 January 2009 Training camp	Basel	3–1	Dynamo Moscow	Sportplatz La Manga, La Manga
14:30	Stocker 4' (1:0); Streller 17' (2:0); Streller 50' (3:0)	Summary	64' (3:1) Kerzhakov	Attendance: 100; Referee: Luis Davales Sanchez (Murcia)

31 January 2009 Winter break	Neuchâtel Xamax	2–0	Basel	Stade de la Maladière, Neuchâtel
15:00	Ovarec 35' (1:0); Kroupi (yellow card) 36'; Niçoise 83' (2:0)	Summary	(yellow card) 36' Abraham	Attendance: 800; Referee: Jérôme Laperrière (Bagnes)

1 February 2009 Winter break	Basel	4–1	Locarno	Stadion Schützenmatte, Basel
13:00	Abraham (red card) 6'; Gjasula 22' (1:1); Carlitos 36' (2:1); Huggel 53' (3:1); Ergić 66' (4:1)	Summary	7' (0:1) Kuhl; (yellow card) 64' Toprak	Attendance: 400; Referee: Claudio Circhetta (Muttenz)

10 February 2009 Mid-season	Basel	3–3	Wohlen	Stadion Rankhof, Basel
16:00	Streller 41' (1:2); Ergić 45' (2:3); Almerares 47' (3:3)	Summary	22' (0:1) Barthlomé; 30' (0:2) Keller; 44' (1:3) Diethelm	Attendance: 400; Referee: Adrien Jaccottet (Basel)

17 February 2009 Mid-season	Basel	3–1	Sochaux	Youth Campus Basel, Münchenstein
15:30	Chipperfield 4' (1:0); Almerares 21' (2:0); Almerares 31' (3:0)	Summary	45' (3:1) Tulasne	Attendance: 100; Referee: Alain Bieri (Bern)

24 February 2009 Mid-season	Basel	2–0	Winterthur	Youth Campus Basel, Münchenstein
15:00	Almerares 50' (1:0); Eduardo 71' (2:0)	Summary		Attendance: 300; Referee: Adrien Jaccottet (Basel)

10 March 2009 Mid-season	Basel	2–2	Basel U-21	Youth Campus Basel, Münchenstein
15:30	Mustafi 48' (1:1); Almerares 51' (2:1)	Summary	20' (0:1) Weisskopf; 85' (2:2) Osmani	Referee: Adrien Jaccottet

31 March 2009 Mid-season	Basel	4–1	La Chaux-de-Fonds	Youth Campus Basel, Münchenstein
16:00	Streller 13' (1:0); Carlitos 34' (2:0); Zoua 68' (3:0); Zoua 85' (4:0)	Summary		Attendance: 200; Referee: Adrien Jaccottet (Basel)

=== Swiss Super League ===
==== First half of season ====
18 July 2008 Round 1	Young Boys	1–2	Basel	Wankdorf, Bern
20:15	Eudis 19' (1:0); Varela (yellow card) 66'; Ghezal (yellow card) 87'	Summary	(yellow card) 10' F. Frei; 69' (1:1) Perović; 87' (1:2) Huggel	Attendance: 23,250; Referee: (Switzerland) Massimo Busacca

23 July 2008 Round 2	Basel	1–0	Grasshopper	St. Jakob-Park, Basel
19:45	Abraham (yellow card) 42'; Perović 46' (1:0); Zanni (yellow card) 56'; Gjasula (yellow card) 92'	Summary	(yellow card) 44' Bobadilla; (yellow card) 74' Salatić	Attendance: 23,915; Referee: (Switzerland) Cyril Zimmermann (Münsingen)

26 July 2008 Round 3	Basel	2–0	Bellinzona	St. Jakob-Park, Basel
19:45	Chipperfield 8' (1:0); Ergić 75' (2:0); Stocker (yellow card) 81'	Summary	(yellow card) 53' La Rocca; (yellow card) 59' Wahab; (yellow card) 74' Bernardet	Attendance: 19,829; Referee: (Switzerland) Daniel Wermelinger

2 August 2008 Round 4	Sion	2–0	Basel	Stade Tourbillon, Sion
17:45	Beto 37' (1:0); Adeshina 45' (2:0); Alioui (yellow card) 50'; Crettenand (yellow card) 64'	Summary	(yellow card) 16' Zanni; (yellow card) 26' Rubio; (yellow card) 45' Perović; (yellow card) 76' Marque	Attendance: 14,800; Referee: (Switzerland) Stefan Messner

9 August 2008 Round 5	Basel	4–0	Vaduz	St. Jakob-Park, Basel
19:45	Zanni 16' (1:0); Abraham (yellow card) 38'; Mustafi 56' (2:0); Mustafi 63' (3:0); Rubio 78' (4:0)	Summary	(yellow card) 53' Cerrone	Attendance: 19,962; Referee: (Switzerland) Alain Bieri

17 August 2008 Round 6	Zürich	1–4	Basel	Letzigrund, Zürich
16:00	Abdi 41' (1:2); Abdi (yellow card) 43'	Summary	13' (0:1) Stocker; 21' (0:2) Chipperfield; 54' (1:3) Carlitos; (yellow card) 71' Gelabert; (yellow card) 84' Morganella; 90+1' (1:4) Carlitos	Attendance: 14,200; Referee: (Switzerland) Sascha Kever

23 August 2008 Round 7	Basel	4–3	Xamax	St. Jakob-Park, Basel
17:45	Huggel 27' (1:0); Derdiyok 27' (2:0); Derdiyok 33' (3:0); Carlitos 43' (4:2)	Summary	(yellow card) 8' Rossi; (yellow card) 21' Besle; (yellow card) 24' Sulaimani; 35' (3:1) Coly; 41' (3:2) Coly; 50' (4:3) Rossi; (yellow card) 78' Rak; (yellow card) 87' Furios	Attendance: 20,321; Referee: (Switzerland) René Rogalla

30 August 2008 Round 8	Aarau	0–2	Basel	Stadion Brügglifeld, Aarau
17:45		Summary	(yellow card) 29' Rubio; 45' Chipperfield; 63' Gelabert; (yellow card) 86' Safari	Attendance: 9,250; Referee: (Switzerland) Jérôme Laperrière

13 September 2008 Round 9	Basel	2–0	Luzern	St. Jakob-Park, Basel
17:45	Huggel 16' (1:0); Chipperfield 84' (2:0)	Summary	(yellow card) 15' Diarra; (yellow card) 32' Seoane	Attendance: 20,627; Referee: (Switzerland) Cyril Zimmermann (Münsingen)

27 September 2008 Round 10	Basel	1–2	Young Boys	St. Jakob-Park, Basel
17:45	Costanzo (yellow card) 38'; Abraham (yellow card) 59'; Huggel (yellow card) 61'; Gelabert 79' (1:2)	Summary	32' Bastians; (yellow card) 43' Bastians; (yellow card) 45' Regazzoni; (yellow card) 59' Varela; 70' (0:2) Häberli; (yellow card) 79' Häberli; (yellow card) 87' Kulaksızoğlu	Attendance: 24,246; Referee: (Switzerland) Sascha Kever

5 October 2008 Round 11	Grasshopper	1–1	Basel	Letzigrund, Zürich
16:00	Bobadilla (yellow card) 3'; Cabanas 15' (1:0)	https://www.fcb-archiv.ch/saison/spiele?command=detail&id=13059 Summary]	(yellow card) 11' Ferati; (yellow card) 28' Zanni; 46' (1:1) Rubio; (yellow card) 64' Derdiyok	Attendance: 12,800; Referee: (Switzerland) Massimo Busacca

26 October 2008 Round 12	Bellinzona	2–3	Basel	Stadio Comunale Bellinzona, Bellinzona
16:00	Lustrinelli 12' (1:0); Costanzo 50' (o.g. 2:0); Sermeter (yellow card) 54'; La Rocca (yellow card) 83'	Summary	(yellow card) 27' Huggel; 54' (2:1) Streller; 56' (2:2) Perović; (yellow card) 80' Marque; 90+3' (2:3) Huggel	Attendance: 4,120; Referee: (Switzerland) Bruno Grossen

30 October 2008 Round 13	Basel	3–0	Sion	St. Jakob-Park, Basel
19:45	Perović 9' (1:0); Huggel 45' (pen. 2:0); Gelabert (yellow card) 61'; Stocker 63' (3:0); Marque (yellow card) 64'	Summary	(yellow card) 45' El Hadary	Attendance: 16,215; Referee: (Switzerland) Massimo Busacca

9 November 2008 Round 14	Vaduz	0–2	Basel	Rheinpark Stadion, Vaduz
16:00	Ritzberger (yellow card) 27'	Summary	(yellow card) 66' F. Frei; (yellow card) 73' Marque; 75' (0:1) Derdiyok; (yellow card) 82' Abraham; (yellow card) 90' Stocker; 90+2' (0:2) Derdiyok	Attendance: 4,720; Referee: (Switzerland) René Rogalla

16 November 2008 Round 15	Basel	1–1	Zürich	St. Jakob-Park, Basel
14:15	Gelabert (yellow card) 9'; Huggel 15' (pen. 1:0); Ferati (yellow card) 39'; F. Frei (yellow card) 72'	Summary	51' (1:1) Hassli; (yellow card) 52' Hassli; (yellow card) 72' Aegerter; (yellow card) 82' Heinz Barmettler	Attendance: 30,149; Referee: (Switzerland) Massimo Busacca

30 November 2008 Round 16	Xamax	2–0	Basel	Stade de la Maladière, Neuchâtel
16:00	Taljevic 34' (pen. 1:0); Zanni 58' (o.g. 2:0); Hodžić (yellow card) 65'; Nuzzolo (yellow card) 78'; Coly (yellow card) 82'; Niasse (yellow card) 20' (yellow-red card) 84'	Summary	(red card) 33' Costanzo; (yellow card) 70' Huggel; (yellow card) 76' Abraham	Attendance: 5,200; Referee: (Switzerland) Nicole Petignat

4 December 2008 Round 17	Basel	3–1	Aarau	St. Jakob-Park, Basel
19:45	Ergić 3' (1:0); Perović 49' (2:1); F. Frei 67' (3:1)	Summary	(yellow card) 27' Lang; 44' (1:1) Rogério	Attendance: 15,730; Referee: (Switzerland) René Rogalla

14 December 2008 Round 18	Luzern	5–1	Basel	Stadion Allmend, Luzern
14:45	Frimpong 15' (1:0); Ferreira (yellow card) 19'; Frimpong 33' (2:1); Ferreira 40' (3:1); Paiva 70' (4:1); Paiva 74' (5:1)	Summary	(yellow card) 17' Marque; 32' (1:1) F. Frei; (yellow card) 55' Morganella	Attendance: 7,626; Referee: (Switzerland) Sascha Kever

==== Second half of season ====
6 February 2009 Round 19	Young Boys	3–2	Basel	Wankdorf, Bern
17:45	Ghezal 49' (1:0); Raimondi 60' (pen. 2:0); Häberli 88' (3:2)	Summary	(yellow card) 36' Zanni; (yellow card) 43' Abraham; 64' (2:1) Streller; 70' (2:2) Derdiyok; (yellow card) 75' Huggel	Attendance: 19,705; Referee: (Switzerland) Carlo Bertolini

15 February 2009 Round 20	Basel	0–0	Grasshopper Club	St. Jakob-Park, Basel
16:00	Safari (yellow card) 38'	Summary	(yellow card) 40' Lulić; (yellow card) 53' Vallori; (yellow card) 70' Salatić; (yellow card) 90+2' Jakupović	Attendance: 20,328; Referee: (Switzerland) Jérôme Laperrière (Bagnes)

22 February 2009 Round 21	Basel	2–1	Zürich	St. Jakob-Park, Basel
16:00	Gjasula (yellow card) 31'; Gjasula 55' (1:1); Zanni (yellow card) 73' (yellow-red card) 77'; Chipperfield 78' (1:2)	Summary	(yellow card) 11' Rochat; 38' (0:1) Hassli; (yellow card) 31' (yellow-red card) 64' Stahel	Attendance: 21,811; Referee: (Switzerland) Jérôme Laperrière (Bagnes)

1 March 2009 Round 22	Luzern	1–2	Basel	Stadion Allmend Luzern
16:00	Paiva 33' (1:1); R. Schwegler (yellow card) 55'; Chiumiento (yellow card) 64'; Frimpong (yellow card) 68'	Summary	22' (0:1) Gjasula; (yellow card) 29' Stocker; (yellow card) 81' Streller; 90+2' (1:2) Chipperfield	Attendance: 10,154; Referee: (Switzerland) Sascha Kever

7 March 2009 Round 23	Basel	3–1	Aarau	St. Jakob-Park, Basel
17:45	Gjasula (yellow card) 69'; Huggel 77' (pen. 1:1); Rapisarda 82' (o.g. 1:2); Stocker (yellow card) 64'; Stocker 85' (1:3)	Summary	26' (1:0) Bengondo	Attendance: 17,526; Referee: (Switzerland) Nikolaj Hänni

14 March 2009 Round 24	Sion	0–4	Basel	Stade Tourbillon, Sion
17:45	Obradović (yellow card) 33'	Summary	(yellow card) 33' Gjasula; 41' (0:1) Mustafi; 45' (0:2) Chipperfield; (yellow card) 68' Zanni; 80' (0:3) Mustafi; 82' (0:4) Perović	Attendance: 11,800; Referee: (Switzerland) Massimo Busacca

21 March 2009 Round 25	Basel	5–0	Vaduz	St. Jakob-Park, Basel
17:45	Chipperfield 8' (1:0), 28' (3:0), 54' (4:0); Streller 18' (2:0); Huggel (yellow card) 57'; Derdiyok 70' (5:0)	Summary	(yellow card) 28'; (yellow card) 57' (yellow-red card) 65' Thordarson; (red card) 89' Nickenig	Attendance: 20,117; Referee: (Switzerland) Bruno Grossen

5 April 2009 Round 26	Bellinzona	1–1	Basel	Stadio Comunale Bellinzona, Bellinzona
16:00	La Rocca 40' (1:0); F. Feltscher (yellow card) 82' (yellow-red card) 90'	Summary	45' (1:1) Stocker; (yellow card) 54' Streller	Attendance: 4,677; Referee: (Switzerland) Jérôme Laperrière (Bagnes)

9 April 2009 Round 27	Basel	3–0	Xamax	St. Jakob-Park, Basel
19:45	Chipperfield 13' (1:0); Chipperfield 66' (2:0); Huggel (yellow card) 74'; Stocker 90' (3:0)	Summary	(yellow card) 5' Rodrigo; (yellow card) 24' Chihab	Attendance: 21,678; Referee: (Switzerland) Alain Bieri (Solothurn)

19 April 2009 Round 28	Xamax	2–3	Basel	Stade de la Maladière, Neuchâtel
16:00	Brown (yellow card) 36'; Besle 47' (1:2); Taljevic 49' (2:2); Chihab (yellow card) 55'	Summary	24' (0:1) Perović; 35' (0:2) Streller; 64' (2:3) Derdiyok; (yellow card) 65' Huggel	Attendance: 6,931; Referee: (Switzerland) René Rogalla

22 April 2009 Round 29	Basel	1–1	Bellinzona	St. Jakob-Park, Basel
19:45	Streller 33' (1:0)	Summary	(yellow card) 42' Diarra; (yellow card) 61' Mehmeti; 76' (1:1) Conti	Attendance: 19,033; Referee: (Switzerland) Daniel Wermelinger

26 April 2009 Round 30	Vaduz	0–1	Basel	Rheinpark Stadion, Vaduz
16:00	Polverino (yellow card) 13'; Sadjo (yellow card) 27'; Ritzberger (yellow card) 65'; Rudan (yellow card) 85'; Galbi (yellow card) 90'	Summary	17' (0:1) Huggel; (yellow card) 90' Huggel	Attendance: 3,215; Referee: (Switzerland) Alain Bieri (Solothurn)

2 May 2009 Round 31	Basel	2–2	Sion	St. Jakob-Park, Basel
17:45	Zanni (yellow card) 28'; Huggel 74' (1:0); Bühler 77' (o.g. 2:0); Costanzo (yellow card) 90'	Summary	(yellow card) 21' Obradović; (yellow card) 29' Nwaneri; (yellow card) 31' Bühler; 78' (2:1) Saborío; 81' (2:2) Domínguez	Attendance: 21,277; Referee: (Switzerland) Carlo Bertolini

9 May 2009 Round 32	Aarau	3–1	Basel	Stadion Brügglifeld, Aarau
17:45	Marazzi 23' (1:0); Bastida 38' (2:0); Paulinho (yellow card) 40'; Bengondo 61' (3:1); Ianu (yellow card) 63'	(Report)	(yellow card) 38' Frei; 42' (2:1) Huggel; (yellow card) 72' Safari; (yellow card) 78' Streller	Attendance: 7,100; Referee: (Switzerland) Cyril Zimmermann

12 May 2009 Round 33	Basel	2–0	Luzern	St. Jakob-Park, Basel
19:45	Huggel (yellow card) 36'; Perović (yellow card) 42'; Zanni 59' (1:0); Perović 70' (2:0)	(Report)		Attendance: 19,051; Referee: (Switzerland) Nikolaj Hänni

17 May 2009 Round 34	Zürich	1–3	Basel	Letzigrund, Zürich
16:00	Tihinen (yellow card) 36'; Djuric 42' (1:1); Hassli (yellow card) 69'; Aegerter (yellow card) 77'; Chikhaoui (yellow card) 90+1'	(Report)	37' (0:1) Gelabert; 71' Streller; (yellow card) 76' Streller; (yellow card) 90' Derdiyok; 90+3' Derdiyok	Attendance: 23,333; Referee: (Switzerland) Massimo Busacca

24 May 2009 Round 35	Grasshopper Club	4–1	Basel	Letzigrund, Zürich
16:15	Dos Santos 40' (1:1); Lulić 45' (2:1); Zárate (yellow card) 45'; Linz 54' (3:1); Schultz 84' (4:1)	(Summary)	36' (0:1) Derdiyok; (yellow card) 47' F. Frei; (yellow card) 53' Abraham	Attendance: 9,300; Referee: (Switzerland) Stéphan Studer

29 May 2009 Round 36	Basel	0–3	Young Boys	St. Jakob-Park, Basel
20:15	Abraham (yellow card) 40'; Ergić (yellow card) 57'	(Summary)	50' (0:1) Baykal; (yellow card) 63' Ghezal; 73' (0:2) D. Degen; 76' (0:3) Häberli	Attendance: 27,526; Referee: (Switzerland) Sascha Kever

==== League table ====
Pos	Team	Pld	W	D	L	GF	GA	GD	Pts	Qualification or relegation
1	Zürich (C)	36	24	7	5	80	36	+44	79	Swiss champions Qualification to Champions League third qualifying round
2	Young Boys	36	22	7	7	85	46	+39	73	Qualification to Europa League third qualifying round
3	Basel	36	22	6	8	72	44	+28	72	Qualification to Europa League second qualifying round
4	Grasshopper	36	12	14	10	57	48	+9	50	
5	Aarau	36	11	11	14	35	51	−16	44	
6	Bellinzona	36	11	10	15	44	51	−7	43	
7	Neuchâtel Xamax	36	10	10	16	50	57	−7	40	
8	Sion	36	9	10	17	44	60	−16	37	Swiss Cup winners Qualification to Europa League play-off round (Note: Sion won the 2008–09 Swiss Cup and thereby qualified for the play-off round of the UEFA Europa League.)
9	Luzern (O)	36	9	8	19	45	62	−17	35	Continue to relegation play-off
10	Vaduz (R)	36	5	7	24	28	85	−57	22	Relegation to Swiss Challenge League (Note: Being a Liechtenstein club, Vaduz are not eligible for qualification to European competitions via the Swiss league system. They did, however, qualify for the second qualifying round of the UEFA Europa League by winning their domestic 2008–09 Liechtenstein Cup.)

Source: rsssf
Rules for classification: 1) points; 2) goal difference; 3) number of goals scored.
(C) Champions; (O) Play-off winners; (R) Relegated

=== Swiss Cup 2008–09 ===
for main article, see Swiss Cup 2008–09

20 September 2008 Round 1	Schötz	0–1	Basel	Sportplatz Wissenhusen, Schötz
18:00		Summary	79' (0:1) Mustafi	Attendance: 4,150; Referee: (Switzerland) Daniel Wermelinger

17 October 2008 Round 2	Bulle	1–4	Basel	Stade de Bouleyres, Bulle
20:00	Barnabo 27' (1:2)	Summary	14' (o0:1) Perović; 16' (0:2) (yellow card) 42' Rubio; 57' (1:3) Streller; 90' (1:4) Gjasula	Attendance: 4,600; Referee: (Switzerland) Bruno Grossen

22 November 2008 Round 3	Thun	0–4	Basel	Stadion Lachen, Thun
18:00	Galli (yellow card) 26'	Summary	22' (0:1) Derdiyok; 29' (0:2) Derdiyok; 60' (0:3) Derdiyok; (yellow card) 80' Safari; 90' (0:4) Gjasula	Attendance: 3,550; Referee: (Switzerland) Carlo Bertolini

18 March 2009 Quarter-final	Zürich	0–1	Basel	Letzigrund, Zürich
20:15	Rochat (yellow card) 44'; Okonkwo (yellow card) 72'; Abdi (yellow card) 83'	Summary	(yellow card) 34' Ergić; 67' (0:1) Huggel	Attendance: 16,200; Referee: (Switzerland) Cyril Zimmermann (Münsingen)

16 April 2009 Semi-final	Young Boys	0–0 (3–2 p)	Basel	Stade de Suisse, Bern
20:15	Portillo (yellow card) 23'; Varela (yellow card) 73'; Hochstrasser (yellow card) 78'	Summary	(yellow card) 37' Abraham; (yellow card) 120+1' Stocker	Attendance: 31,120; Referee: (Switzerland) Carlo Bertolini
	Penalties
	Yapi (penalty scored); Hochstrasser (penalty missed); Bastians (penalty scored); Schneuwly (penalty scored)		(penalty missed) Huggel; (penalty scored) Ergić; (penalty missed) Abraham; (penalty scored) Chipperfield; (penalty missed) Gjasula

=== UEFA Champions League ===
==== Second qualifying round ====
30 July 2008 1st Leg	IFK Göteborg (Sweden)	1–1	(Switzerland) Basel	Ullevi, Gothenburg
20:15 CET	Wernbloom (yellow card) 25'; Olsson 32' (1:1)	UEFA summary FCB summary	26' (0:1) Huggel; (yellow card) 50' Abraham; (yellow card) 68' Carlitos; (yellow card) 82' Safari	Attendance: 10,914; Referee: Paolo Dondarini (Italy)

6 August 2008 2nd Leg	Basel (Switzerland)	4–2 (5–3 agg.)	(Sweden) IFK Göteborg	St. Jakob-Park, Basel
20:15 CET	Huggel 27' (1:1); Chipperfield 71' (2:2); Marque (yellow card) 79'; Ergić 84' (pen. 3:2); Ergić 90+4' (4:4)	Report; FCB summary	(yellow card) 5' Wernbloom; 19' (0:1) Wernbloom; 52' (1:2) Söder; (yellow card) 55' Olsson; (yellow card) 90' Erikson	Attendance: 18,846; Referee: Charles Richmond (Scotland)

==== Third qualifying round ====
13 August 2008 1st Leg	Vitória de Guimarães (Portugal)	0–0	(Switzerland) Basel	Estádio D. Afonso Henriques, Guimarães
21:30 CET	Stocker (yellow card) 21'	UEFA summary FCB summary	(yellow card) 36' Douglas; (yellow card) 58' Meireles	Attendance: 21,452; Referee: Grzegorz Gilewski (Polish Football Association)

27 August 2008 2nd Leg	Basel (Switzerland)	2–1 (2–1 agg.)	(Portugal) Vitória Guimarães	St. Jakob-Park, Basel
20:15 CET	Stocker 11' (1:0); Huggel (yellow card) 44'; Derdiyok 54' (2:1)	UEFA summary FCB summary	15' (pen. 1:1) Fajardo; (yellow card) 20' Nilson; (yellow card) 27' Meireles; (yellow card) 41' Alves; (yellow card) 46' Douglas; (yellow card) 74' Moreno	Attendance: 30,002; Referee: Pieter Vink (Royal Dutch Football Association)

==== Group stage ====
16 September 2008 Round 1	Basel (Switzerland)	1–2	(Ukraine) Shakhtar Donetsk	St. Jakob-Park, Basel
20:45	Zanni (yellow card) 37'; Abraham 90+3' (1:2)	UEFA summary FCB summary	25' (0:1) Fernandinho; (yellow card) 33' Hübschman; (yellow card) 41' Shevchuk; 45+1' (0:2) Jádson; (yellow card) 90' Brandão	Attendance: 34,820; Referee: Terje Hauge (Norway)

1 October 2008 Round 2	Sporting CP (Portugal)	2–0	(Switzerland) Basel	Estádio José Alvalade, Lisbon
20:45	Grimi (yellow card) 17'; Veloso (yellow card) 45'; Romagnoli 55' (1:0); Tonel (yellow card) 85'; Derlei 86' (2:0)	UEFA summary FCB summary	(yellow card) 74' Streller	Attendance: 22,638; Referee: Nicola Rizzoli (Italian Football Federation)

22 October 2008 Round 3	Basel (Switzerland)	0–5	(Spain) Barcelona	St. Jakob-Park, Basel
20:45	Rubio (yellow card) 43'; Abraham (yellow card) 84'	UEFA summary FCB summary	4' (0:1) Messi; 15' (0:2) Busquets; 22' (0:3) Bojan; 46' (0:4) Bojan; 48' (0:5) Xavi	Attendance: 37,500; Referee: Eric Braamhaar (Royal Dutch Football Association)

4 November 2008 Round 4	Barcelona (Spain)	1–1	(Switzerland) Basel	Camp Nou, Barcelona
20:45	Messi 62' (1:0)	UEFA summary FCB summary	82' (1:1) Derdiyok; (yellow card) 89' Costanzo	Attendance: 49,479; Referee: Alexandru Tudor (Romania)

26 November 2008 Round 5	Shakhtar Donetsk (Ukraine)	5–0	(Switzerland) Basel	RSC Olimpiyskiy, Donetsk
20:45	Jádson 32' (1:0); Willian 50' (2:0); Jádson 65' (3:0); Jádson 72' (4:0); Seleznyov 75' (5:0)	UEFA summary FCB summary	(yellow card) 87' Stocker	Attendance: 15,000; Referee: Kristinn Jakobsson (Iceland)

9 December 2008 Round 6	Basel (Switzerland)	0–1	(Portugal) Sporting CP	St. Jakob-Park, Basel
20:45	Streller (yellow card) 45'	UEFA summary FCB summary	19' (0:1) Djaló; (yellow card) 72' Caneira	Attendance: 30,248; Referee: Paul Allaerts (Belgium)

==== Group C table ====
Pos	Team	Pld	W	D	L	GF	GA	GD	Pts	Qualification
1	(Spain) Barcelona	6	4	1	1	18	8	+10	13	Advance to knockout phase
2	(Portugal) Sporting CP	6	4	0	2	8	8	0	12	Advance to knockout phase
3	(Ukraine) Shakhtar Donetsk	6	3	0	3	11	7	+4	9	Transfer to UEFA Cup
4	(Switzerland) Basel	6	0	1	5	2	16	−14	1	

Source: RSSSF

== Player statistics ==
=== League goalscorers/assists ===
Updated to games played 29 May 2009

League Scorer	Goals
(Australia) Scott Chipperfield	12
(Switzerland) Benjamin Huggel	10
(Switzerland) Eren Derdiyok	9
(Serbia) Marko Perovic	8
(Switzerland) Valentin Stocker	6
(Switzerland) Marco Streller	6
(Switzerland) Orhan Mustafi	4
(Portugal) Carlitos	3
(Argentina) Marcos Gelabert	3
(Germany) Jurgen Gjasula	2
(Chile) Eduardo Rubio	2
(Serbia) Ivan Ergić	2
(Switzerland) Fabian Frei	2
(Switzerland) Reto Zanni	2
Opposition own goals	1
Total goals scored	72

Name	League Assists
(Portugal) Carlitos	8
(Switzerland) Fabian Frei	7
(Switzerland) Eren Derdiyok	6
(Switzerland) Marco Streller	6
(Switzerland) Valentin Stocker	6
(Australia) Scott Chipperfield	4
(Serbia) Marko Perovic	4
(Chile) Eduardo Rubio	2
(Argentina) Marcos Gelabert	2
(Sweden) Behrang Safari	1
(Switzerland) Benjamin Huggel	1
(Germany) Jurgen Gjasula	1
(Switzerland) Reto Zanni	1
(Serbia) Ivan Ergić	1
Total assists made	50

=== Swiss Cup goalscorers/assists ===
Updated to games played 13 April 2009

Cup Scorer	Goals
(Switzerland) Eren Derdiyok	3
(Germany) Jurgen Gjasula	2
(Chile) Eduardo Rubio	1
(Switzerland) Marco Streller	1
(Switzerland) Orhan Mustafi	1
(Switzerland) Benjamin Huggel	1
Opposition own goals	1
Total goals scored	10

Name	Cup Assists
(Switzerland) Reto Zanni	2
(Switzerland) Valentin Stocker	1
(Portugal) Carlitos	1
(Chile) Eduardo Rubio	1
(Serbia) Marko Perović	1
Total assists made	6

=== European goalscorers/assists ===
Updated to games played 26 November 2008

European Scorer	Goals
(Switzerland) Eren Derdiyok	2
(Switzerland) Benjamin Huggel	2
(Serbia) Ivan Ergić	2
(Australia) Scott Chipperfield	1
(Switzerland) Valentin Stocker	1
(Argentina) David Abraham	1
Total goals scored	9

Name	European Assists
(Portugal) Carlitos	2
(Germany) Jurgen Gjasula	2
(Switzerland) Eren Derdiyok	1
(Switzerland) Valentin Stocker	1
(Serbia) Ivan Ergić	1
(Serbia) Marko Perović	1
Total assists made	8

=== Total goalscorers/assists ===
Updated to games played 29 May 2009

All Game Scorer	Goals
(Switzerland) Eren Derdiyok	14
(Australia) Scott Chipperfield	13
(Switzerland) Benjamin Huggel	13
(Serbia) Marko Perović	8
(Switzerland) Valentin Stocker	7
(Switzerland) Marco Streller	7
(Switzerland) Orhan Mustafi	5
(Germany) Jurgen Gjasula	4
(Serbia) Ivan Ergić	4
(Portugal) Carlitos	3
(Argentina) Marcos Gelabert	3
(Chile) Eduardo Rubio	3
(Switzerland) Fabian Frei	2
(Switzerland) Reto Zanni	2
(Argentina) David Abraham	1
Opposition own goals	2
Total goals scored	91

Name	All Assists
(Portugal) Carlitos	11
(Switzerland) Valentin Stocker	8
(Switzerland) Fabian Frei	7
(Switzerland) Eren Derdiyok	7
(Switzerland) Marco Streller	6
(Serbia) Marko Perović	6
(Australia) Scott Chipperfield	4
(Chile) Eduardo Rubio	3
(Germany) Jurgen Gjasula	3
(Switzerland) Reto Zanni	3
(Argentina) Marcos Gelabert	2
(Serbia) Ivan Ergić	2
(Sweden) Behrang Safari	1
(Switzerland) Benjamin Huggel	1
Total Assists Made	64

== Honours and awards ==
=== Team ===
- Uhren Cup winner

=== Individual ===
- Goal of the Year: Fabian Frei (Basel, scored against Aarau)
- Swiss Youngster of the Year, 2008–09 – Valentin Stocker
