= 2007–08 FC Luzern season =

FC Luzern
- Chairman: Walter Stierli
- Manager: Ciriaco Sforza
- Stadium: Stadion Allmend
- Swiss Super League: 6th
- Swiss Cup: Round of 16
- Top goalscorer: League: Mauro Lustrinelli (14); All: Mauro Lustrinelli (14)
- Average home league attendance: 9,181
- Biggest win: Luzern 4–0 Thun
- Biggest defeat: Young Boys 6–1 Luzern

The 2007–08 season was the 83rd season in the history of Fussball-Club Luzern and the club's second consecutive season in the top flight of Swiss football.

== Competitions ==
=== Overall record ===
Competition	First match	Last match	Starting round	Final position	Record							
Competition	First match	Last match	Starting round	Final position	Pld	W	D	L	GF	GA	GD	Win %
Swiss Super League	21 July 2007	10 May 2008	Matchday 1	6th	36	10	14	12	40	49	−9	27.78
Swiss Cup	16 September 2007	24 November 2007	Round of 64	Round of 16	3	2	0	1	8	4	+4	66.67
Total					39	12	14	13	48	53	−5	30.77

Source: Competitions

=== Swiss Super League ===
==== League table ====
Pos	Team	Pld	W	D	L	GF	GA	GD	Pts	Qualification or relegation
4	Grasshopper	36	15	9	12	57	49	+8	54	Qualification to Intertoto Cup second round
5	Aarau	36	11	14	11	47	48	−1	47	
6	Luzern	36	10	14	12	40	49	−9	44	
7	Sion	36	11	10	15	48	51	−3	43	
8	Neuchâtel Xamax	36	10	11	15	48	55	−7	41	

Source: RSSSF
Rules for classification: 1) points; 2) goal difference; 3) number of goals scored.

==== Results summary ====
Overall								Home						Away					
Pld	W	D	L	GF	GA	GD	Pts	W	D	L	GF	GA	GD	W	D	L	GF	GA	GD
36	10	14	12	40	49	−9	44	5	9	4	24	23	+1	5	5	8	16	26	−10

Source: Swiss Super League

==== Results by round ====
Round	1	2	3	4	5	6	7	8	9	10	11	12	13	14	15	16	17	18	19	20	21	22	23	24	25	26	27	28	29	30	31	32	33	34	35	36
Ground	H	A	H	A	H	A	H	H	A	A	H	A	H	A	H	A	A	H	A	H	A	H	A	H	A	H	A	H	A	H	A	H	A	H	A	H
Result	D	L	D	W	D	D	L	D	W	D	D	L	D	D	D	L	D	L	W	W	W	W	L	D	L	L	L	W	W	D	D	W	L	W	L	L
Position	4	8	8	5	7	8	9	8	5	6	6																									

Source: World Football
A = Away; H = Home; W = Win; D = Draw; L = Loss

==== Matches ====
21 July 2007 1	Luzern	1–1	Neuchâtel Xamax	Lucerne
17:45 CEST (UTC+2)				Stadium: Stadion Allmend

26 July 2007 2	Zürich	4–1	Luzern	Zürich
19:45 CEST (UTC+2)				Stadium: Letzigrund

29 July 2007 3	Luzern	2–2	Young Boys	Lucerne
16:00 CEST (UTC+2)				Stadium: Stadion Allmend

4 August 2007 4	St. Gallen	1–2	Luzern	St. Gallen
17:45 CEST (UTC+2)				Stadium: Espenmoos

12 August 2007 5	Luzern	3–3	Grasshopper	Lucerne
16:00 CEST (UTC+2)				Stadium: Stadion Allmend

18 August 2007 6	Aarau	0–0	Luzern	Aarau
17:45 CEST (UTC+2)				Stadium: Stadion Brügglifeld

25 August 2007 Round 7	Luzern	2–4	Basel	Stadion Allmend Luzern
17:45	Lustrinelli 13' (1:0) (yellow card) 18'; Cantaluppi 31' (2:2)	Summary	22' (pen. 1:1) Majstorović; 27' (1:2) Streller; 56' (2:3) Chipperfield; 63' (2:4) Chipperfield; (yellow card) 73' Morganella	Attendance: 10,287; Referee: (Switzerland) Massimo Busacca

3 September 2007 8	Luzern	1–1	Sion	Lucerne
19:45 CEST (UTC+2)				Stadium: Stadion Allmend

22 September 2007 9	Thun	0–1	Luzern	Thun
17:45 CEST (UTC+2)				Stadium: Stadion Lachen

26 September 2007 10	Neuchâtel Xamax	3–3	Luzern	Neuchâtel
19:45 CEST (UTC+2)				Stadium: Stade de la Maladière

29 September 2007 11	Luzern	2–2	Zürich	Lucerne
17:45 CEST (UTC+2)				Stadium: Stadion Allmend

6 October 2007 12	Young Boys	6–1	Luzern	Bern
17:45 CEST (UTC+2)				Stadium: Stade de Suisse

27 October 2007 13	Luzern	1–1	St. Gallen	Lucerne
17:45 CEST (UTC+2)				Stadium: Stadion Allmend

31 October 2007 14	Grasshopper	1–1	Luzern	Zürich
19:45 CET (UTC+1)				Stadium: Letzigrund

4 November 2007 15	Luzern	0–0	Aarau	Lucerne
16:00 CET (UTC+1)				Stadium: Stadion Allmend

11 November 2007 Round 16	Basel	3–2	Luzern	St. Jakob-Park, Basel
16:00	Streller 3' (1:0); Caicedo 15' (2:0); Majstorović (yellow card) 44'; D. Degen 56' (3:1)	Summary	(yellow card) 27' (red card) 81' Marić; 49' (2:1) Wiss; 62' (3:2) Tchouga	Attendance: 21,575; Referee: (Switzerland) René Rogalla

1 December 2007 17	Sion	0–0	Luzern	Sion
17:45 CEST (UTC+2)				Stadium: Stade Tourbillon

8 December 2007 18	Luzern	1–2	Thun	Lucerne
17:45 CET (UTC+1)				Stadium: Stadion Allmend

3 February 2008 19	Neuchâtel Xamax	0–1	Luzern	Neuchâtel
16:00 CET (UTC+1)				Stadium: Stade de la Maladière

10 February 2008 20	Luzern	2–0	Aarau	Lucerne
16:00 CET (UTC+1)				Stadium: Stadion Allmend

16 February 2008 21	Thun	0–1	Luzern	Thun
17:45 CET (UTC+1)				Stadium: Stadion Lachen

24 February 2008 22	Luzern	2–1	Zürich	Lucerne
16:00 CET (UTC+1)				Stadium: Stadion Allmend

1 March 2008 23	St. Gallen	2–1	Luzern	St. Gallen
17:45 CEST (UTC+2)				Stadium: Espenmoos

8 March 2008 24	Luzern	1–1	Sion	Lucerne
17:45 CET (UTC+1)				Stadium: Stadion Allmend

15 March 2008 25	Grasshopper	2–0	Luzern	Zürich
17:45 CET (UTC+1)				Stadium: Letzigrund

18 March 2008 26	Luzern	0–3	Young Boys	Lucerne
19:45 CET (UTC+1)				Stadium: Stadion Allmend

22 March 2008 Round 27	Basel	1–0	Luzern	St. Jakob-Park, Basel
17:45	Majstorović 45' (pen. 1:0); Costanzo (yellow card) 94'	Summary	(yellow card) 75' Diarra	Attendance: 20,331; Referee: (Switzerland) Daniel Wermelinger

29 March 2008 Round 28	Luzern	1–0	Basel	Stadion Allmend Luzern
17:45	Lustrinelli 62' (1:0)	Summary	(yellow card) 24' Stocker; (yellow card) 79' Zanni	Attendance: 11,623; Referee: (Switzerland) Bruno Grossen

13 April 2008 30	Luzern	0–0	Grasshopper	Lucerne
16:00 CEST (UTC+2)				Stadium: Stadion Allmend

16 April 2008 31	Sion	0–0	Luzern	Sion
19:45 CEST (UTC+2)				Stadium: Stade Tourbillon

19 April 2008 32	Luzern	1–0	St. Gallen	Lucerne
17:45 CEST (UTC+2)				Stadium: Stadion Allmend

24 April 2008 29	Young Boys	0–1	Luzern	Bern
19:45 CEST (UTC+2)				Stadium: Stade de Suisse

27 April 2008 33	Zürich	1–0	Luzern	Zürich
16:00 CEST (UTC+2)				Stadium: Letzigrund

3 May 2008 34	Luzern	4–0	Thun	Lucerne
19:45 CEST (UTC+2)				Stadium: Stadion Allmend

6 May 2008 35	Aarau	2–1	Luzern	Aarau
20:45 CEST (UTC+2)				Stadium: Stadion Brügglifeld

10 May 2008 36	Luzern	0–2	Neuchâtel Xamax	Lucerne
17:45 CEST (UTC+2)				Stadium: Stadion Allmend

=== Swiss Cup ===
16 September 2007 Round of 64	GC Biaschesi	1–3	Luzern	Biasca
15:30 CEST (UTC+2)

21 October 2007 Round of 32	FC Langenthal	2–5	Luzern	Langenthal
14:30 CEST (UTC+2)

24 November 2007 Round of 16	Luzern	0–1	Thun	Lucerne
17:45 CET (UTC+1)				Stadium: Stadion Allmend
