= Marcos Gelabert =

Argentine footballer

Personal information
- Full name: Marcos Agustín Gelabert
- Date of birth: 16 September 1981 (age 45)
- Place of birth: General Pico, Argentina
- Height: 1.76 m (5 ft 9 in)
- Position: Midfielder

Team information
- Current team: Gimnasia Mendoza

Senior career*
Years	Team	Apps	(Gls)
2001–2006	Estudiantes	105	(5)
2006–2008	St. Gallen	60	(1)
2008–2010	Basel	46	(5)
2010–2012	Neuchâtel Xamax	27	(2)
2012–2013	Estudiantes LP	28	(1)
2013–2014	Tigre	14	(0)
2014–2020	San Martín SJ	136	(10)
2020–	Gimnasia Mendoza	8	(1)
- * Club domestic league appearances and goals as of 13:48, 28 March 2021 (UTC)

Marcos Agustín Gelabert (born 16 September 1981, in General Pico, La Pampa) is an Argentine footballer who plays for Gimnasia Mendoza. His position is defensive midfielder.

== Career ==
Gelabert started his career at Estudiantes de La Plata in the Primera División Argentina in 2001. He went on to play over 100 games for the club before he moved to Swiss Super League side FC St. Gallen in 2006. He became, arguably, the club's best player but after their relegation into the Swiss Challenge League at the end of the 2007–08 season he moved on.

On 16 June 2008 Gelabert signed for FC Basel penning a three-year contract. He joined Basel's first team for their 2008–09 season under head coach Christian Gross. To the beginning of the season Gelabert was member of the Basel team that won the Uhrencup. They beat Legia Warsaw 6–1 and played a 2–2 draw with Borussia Dortmund to end the table on top slot above Dortmund and Luzern. After playing in seven test games Gelabert played his domestic league debut for his new club in the away game at the Stade de Suisse, Wankdorf on 18 July as Basel won 2–1 against Young Boys.

Basel joined the 2008–09 UEFA Champions League in the second qualifying round and with an aggregate score of 5–3 they eliminated IFK Göteborg. Gelabert played his first European game in a Basel shirt on 13 August in the Champions League Qualifying match draw against Vitória de Guimarães at Estádio D. Afonso Henriques. The first leg ended goalless, but with a 2–1 win in the second leg they eliminated Vitória and advanced to the group stage. Here Basel were matched with Barcelona, Sporting CP and Shakhtar Donetsk, but ended the group in last position, winning just one point after a 1–1 draw in Camp Nou. Gelabert had five European appearances, including the game in Barcelona. Gelabert scored his first goal for his new club on 30 August in the away game at Stadion Brügglifeld as Basel won 2–0 against FC Aarau. At the end of the 2008–09 Super League season Basel were third in the table, seven points behind new champions Zürich and one adrift of runners-up Young Boys.

In the following season Basel joined the 2009–10 UEFA Europa League in the second qualifying round. Gelabert scored his first European goal in the second leg of the tie which Basel won 4–1 against Santa Coloma. Basel advanced to the group stage, in which despite winning three of the six games they ended in third position and were eliminated. They finished four points behind group winners Roma and one behind Fulham, against whom they lost 3–2 in the last game of the stage. At the end of the 2009–10 season he won the Double with his club. They won the League Championship title with 3 points advantage over second placed Young Boys. The team won the Swiss Cup, winning the final 6–0 against Lausanne-Sport.

On 14 June 2010 Gelabert left the club and transferred to Neuchâtel Xamax. During his two seasons with the team, he played a total of 105 games for Basel scoring a total of 13 goals. 46 of these games were in the Swiss Super League, six in the Swiss Cup, 11 in the UEFA competitions (Champions League and Europa League) and 40 were friendly games. He scored five goals in the domestic league, three in the UEFA Europa League and the other five were scored during the test games.

In the summer of 2010, Gelabert joined Xamax, with whom he signed a three-year contract. However, this lost its validity in January 2012 after Xamax initially had its license revoked and the club then filed for bankruptcy.

== Honours ==
Basel

- Swiss Super League: 2010
- Swiss Cup: 2010
- Uhren Cup: 2008
