= Stéphane Besle =

French footballer (born 1984)

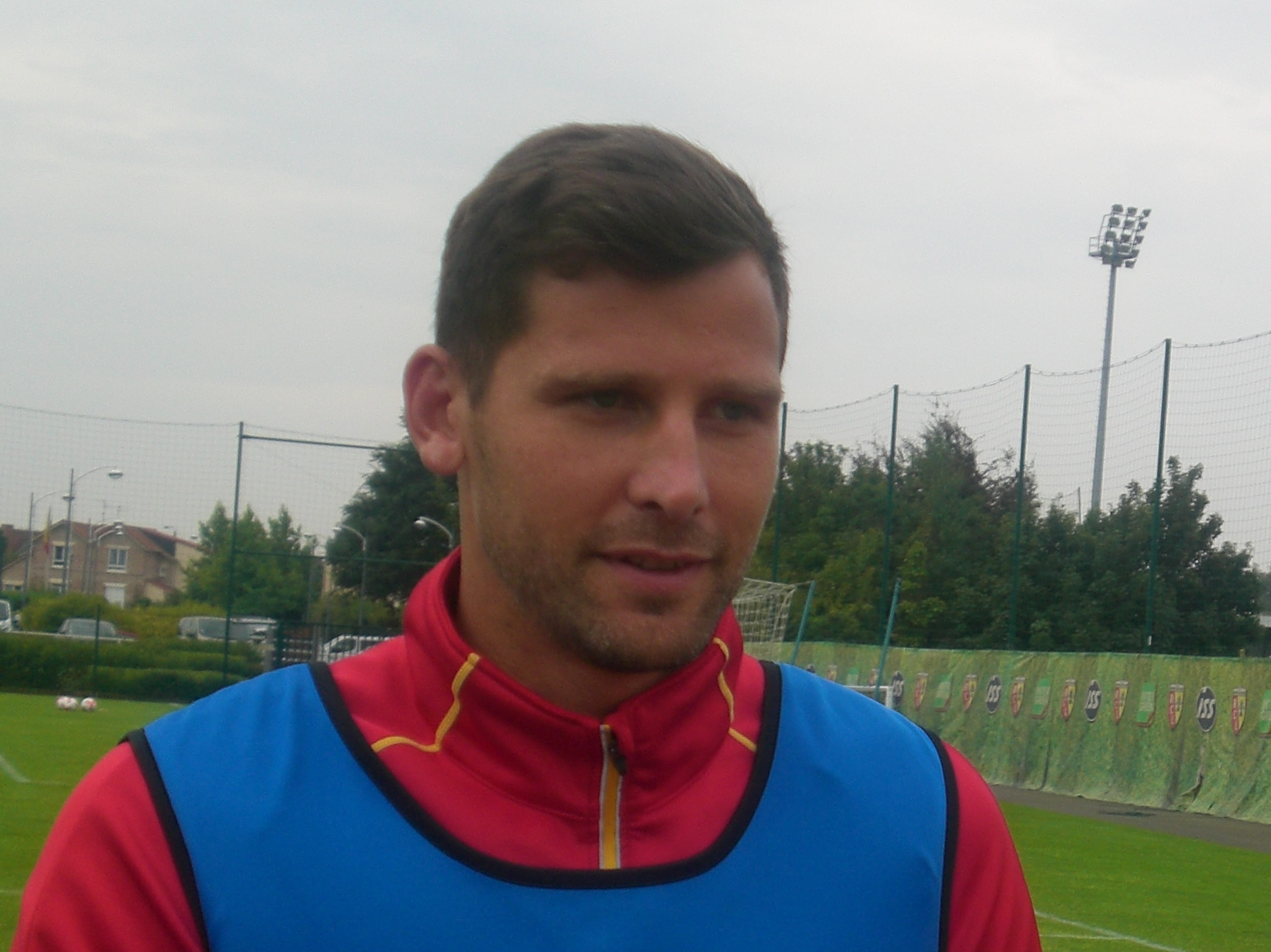

Personal information
- Full name: Stéphane Besle
- Date of birth: 23 January 1984 (age 42)
- Place of birth: Haguenau, France
- Height: 1.88 m (6 ft 2 in)
- Position: Centre back

Senior career*
Years	Team	Apps	(Gls)
2002–2003	Lens B	5	(2)
2003–2004	Lens	1	(0)
2004–2005	Lens B	28	(1)
2005–2012	Neuchâtel Xamax	132	(9)
2012	Metz	15	(1)
2012–2015	St. Gallen	86	(7)
2015–2016	Lens	13	(0)
2016	→ Aarau (loan)	15	(2)
2016–2017	Aarau	36	(3)
- * Club domestic league appearances and goals

Stéphane Besle (French pronunciation: [stefan bɛl]; born 23 January 1984 in Haguenau) is a retired French footballer. He previously played for Swiss club Neuchâtel Xamax having signed with the team in summer 2005, along with teammate Matar Coly. Besle established himself as a first-choice central defender for Xamax and was the club's captain before being released in December 2011.
