= Joetex Asamoah Frimpong =

Ghanaian footballer

Personal information
- Full name: Kwabena Joseph Asamoah-Frimpong
- Date of birth: 17 April 1982 (age 44)
- Place of birth: Mampong, Ashanti, Ghana
- Height: 1.77 m (5 ft 10 in)
- Position: Striker

Youth career
- 1997–2000: Niger Tornadoes
- 2000: Katsina United
- 2001–2002: Gabros F.C.

Senior career*
Years	Team	Apps	(Gls)
2002–2003	El-Kanemi Warriors	34	(18)
2003–2006	Enyimba		
2006	→ Al-Nasr (loan)	10	(3)
2006	CS Sfaxien	4	(1)
2007–2010	Young Boys	33	(7)
2008–2010	→ FC Luzern (loan)	23	(13)
2010–2013	FC Grenchen	14	(5)
2012–2013	→ FC Zürich (loan)	7	(0)

International career
2005–2009	Ghana	11	(2)

Managerial career
- 2014–: FC Niederbipp
- * Club domestic league appearances and goals

Kwabena Joseph "Joetex" Asamoah Frimpong (born 17 April 1982) is a Ghanaian former professional footballer who played as a striker.

== Club career ==
Frimpong was born in Mampong. He began his career in Nigeria with Gabros of Nnewi and El-Kanemi, where he became top scorer and earned a move to Enyimba F.C. He won the CAF African Champions League with Enyimba in 2003 and 2004, scoring a total of 14 goals, but he missed the 2005 competition through injury.

He signed on loan for Saudi Arabian side Al-Nasr on 3 February 2006, with an option to make the deal permanent. He left the club on 7 April 2006, scoring three goals in ten appearances.

Frimpong signed for CS Sfaxien of Tunisia later in 2006, and made an immediate impact in the group stages of the CAF Champions League. He scored a vital goal in the first-leg of the final

In November 2006, Frimpong expressed a desire for a move to Europe and on 16 February 2007 his wish was granted, after he signed a three-year deal with Swiss Premier side BSC Young Boys. He made his league debut for the club on 25 February 2007, in a 3–1 victory over FC Thun; Frimpong celebrated his debut with two goals.

In September 2007, Frimpong was handed a four-match ban and given a fine of 1,100 US dollars after assaulting St. Gallen player Jürgen Gjasula during a league match. The Swiss FA decided not to give him the maximum six match ban after video evidence showed that he was provoked by Gjasula.

On 6 September 2008, he was loaned to FC Luzern.

== International career ==
Frimpong was initially invited to the Nigerian U-23 side, but was dropped when the coach was informed of his true nationality.

Frimpong was a member of the Ghana Squad that played in the 2006 African Cup of Nations. He was however not selected into the Ghana Squad that played in the 2006 FIFA World Cup, having spent a large part of last year out injured and then failing to shine at the year's 2006 African Cup of Nations in Egypt.

On 7 February 2007, Joetex continued his excellent performances at the International level by scoring his 1st goal for Ghana in their 4–1 victory over Nigeria in London

== Frimpong Football Academy ==
He is the founder and chairman of the Football talents company Frimpong Football Academy (since 2010), which is based in Minna.

== Honours ==
Enyimba

- African Champions League: 2003, 2004
- 2x Nigerian Professional Football League
- Nigerian Cup: 2005

CS Sfaxien

- Tunisian Cup: 2006
