= Eduardo Rubio =

Chilean footballer (born 1983)

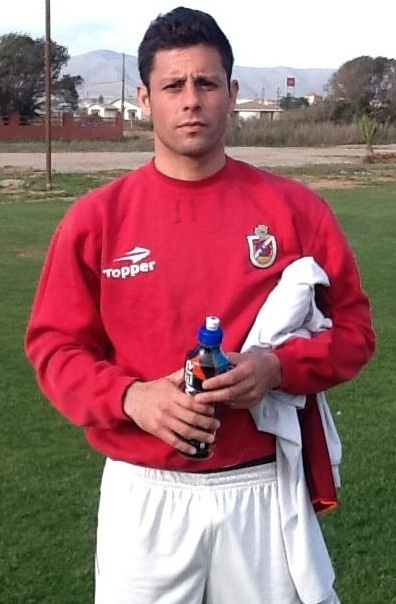
- Rubio with Deportes La Serena in 2012

Personal information
- Full name: Eduardo Javier Rubio Köstner
- Date of birth: 7 November 1983 (age 43)
- Place of birth: Chuquicamata, Chile
- Height: 1.75 m (5 ft 9 in)
- Position: Striker

Youth career
- 1998: Colo Colo
- 1999–2002: Universidad Católica

Senior career*
Years	Team	Apps	(Gls)
2002–2006	Universidad Católica	128	(27)
2007–2009	Cruz Azul	9	(0)
2007–2008	→ Colo Colo (loan)	22	(6)
2008–2009	→ Basel (loan)	9	(2)
2009–2010	Unión Española	15	(1)
2011–2012	Deportes La Serena	41	(5)
2014	Lota Schwager	12	(1)

International career
2004–2008	Chile	14	(3)

Managerial career
- 2017–2025: Colo-Colo (youth)
- 2021: Colo-Colo (caretaker)
- * Club domestic league appearances and goals

Eduardo Javier Rubio Köstner (born 7 November 1983) is a Chilean football manager and former player.

== Playing career ==
=== Club ===
Rubio made his debut for Universidad Católica in 2002 against Unión Española. After five years with Universidad Católica, Rubio left Chile at the beginning of 2007 for Mexico to play for Cruz Azul. In Mexico, Rubio went through a horrible time only playing nine times and never finding the back of the net. At the end of 2007 Rubio returned to Chile on a yearlong loan, to play for Colo-Colo where he enjoyed modest success.

On 19 July 2008, it was announced he had signed for Swiss Super League Champions FC Basel on a one-year loan, with the option of a permanent takeover. He joined Basel's first team for their 2008–09 season under head coach Christian Gross. Rubio played his domestic league debut for the club in the home game in the St. Jakob-Park on 23 July. He came on substitute for Fabian Frei as Basel won 1–0 against Grasshopper Club. He made his full debut on 2 August in a 2–0 defeat to FC Sion at Stade Tourbillon and he was shown the yellow card for a rude foul in the 26th minute. He scored his first league goal for the team the following week, on 9 August. It was the last goal of the game as Basel won 4–0 at home against FC Vaduz.

Basel joined the 2008–09 UEFA Champions League in the second qualifying round and with an aggregate score of 5–3 they eliminated IFK Göteborg. Rubio made first European appearance in a Basel shirt on 13 August 2008 as a substitute in Champions League Qualifying match against Vitória de Guimarães at Estádio D. Afonso Henriques, which ended in a goalless draw. With a 2–1 win in the second leg they eliminated Vitória and advanced to the group stage. Here Basel were matched with Barcelona, Sporting CP and Shakhtar Donetsk, but ended the group in last position winning just one point after a 1–1 draw in Camp Nou.

At the end of the 2008–09 Super League season Basel were third in the league table, seven points behind new champions Zürich and one adrift of runners-up Young Boys. However, as the season progressed, Rubio became less and less playing time. At the end of the loan period, it was decided not to pull the takeover option. During his time with the club, Rubio played a total of 23 games for Basel scoring three goals. Nine of these games were in the Swiss Super League, two in the Swiss Cup, three in the Champions League and nine were friendly games. He scored two goals in the domestic league and one in the cup.

Rubio returned to Cruz Azul in June 2009, but soon transferred to Unión Española.

=== International ===
Rubio made his name with the Sub-20 squad during a competition held in Uruguay in 2003. On 17 November 2004, he made his debut for the Chile national team in a 2–1 World Cup Qualifier defeat to Peru at the Estadio Nacional in Lima.

== Managerial career ==
He graduated as Football Manager at the Instituto Nacional del Fútbol (National Football Institute) and began his managerial career in Colo-Colo at under-12 level in 2017. After an outbreak of COVID-19, he replaced Gustavo Quinteros and managed Colo-Colo in the Chilean Primera División match against Audax Italiano on 28 October 2021.

Rubio left Colo-Colo in August 2025 and moved to the United States to work for Sonny G Academy.

== Personal life ==
Rubio studied engineering as well as playing professional football. He is also known as Pajarito and Edu and is the son of former Chilean international player Hugo "Pájaro" Rubio and the grandson of Ildefonso Rubio, a historical goalkeeper of Rangers de Talca. His brothers Matías and Diego are professional footballers.

In 2011, Rubio married the Chilean actress and former participant of the second season of the dating show Amor Ciego (Blind Love), Javiera de Rosas.

== Honours ==
Universidad Católica

- Chilean Primera División: 2005 Clausura

Colo-Colo

- Chilean Primera División: 2007 Clausura
