= David Abraham (footballer) =

Argentine footballer (born 1986)

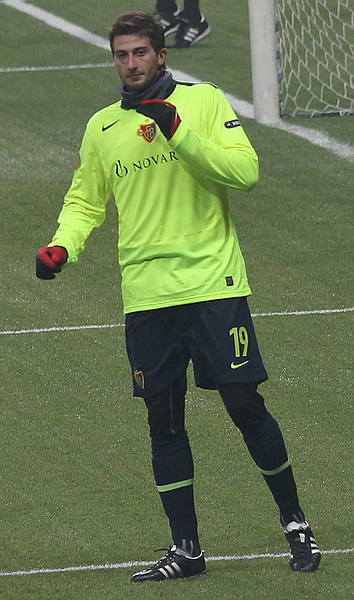
- Abraham training for FC Basel in 2011

Personal information
- Full name: David Ángel Abraham
- Date of birth: 15 July 1986 (age 40)
- Place of birth: Chabás, Argentina
- Position: Centre-back

Senior career*
Years	Team	Apps	(Gls)
2004–2007	Independiente	70	(2)
2007–2008	Gimnàstic	36	(3)
2008–2012	FC Basel	104	(8)
2012–2013	Getafe	9	(0)
2013–2015	1899 Hoffenheim	46	(2)
2015–2021	Eintracht Frankfurt	138	(3)
2021	Huracán de Chabás	0	(0)
Total		403	(18)

International career
2005	Argentina U20	6	(0)
- * Club domestic league appearances and goals as of 22:15, 17 January 2021 (UTC)

David Ángel Abraham (born 15 July 1986) is an Argentine former professional footballer who played as a central defender.

== Career ==
=== Independiente ===
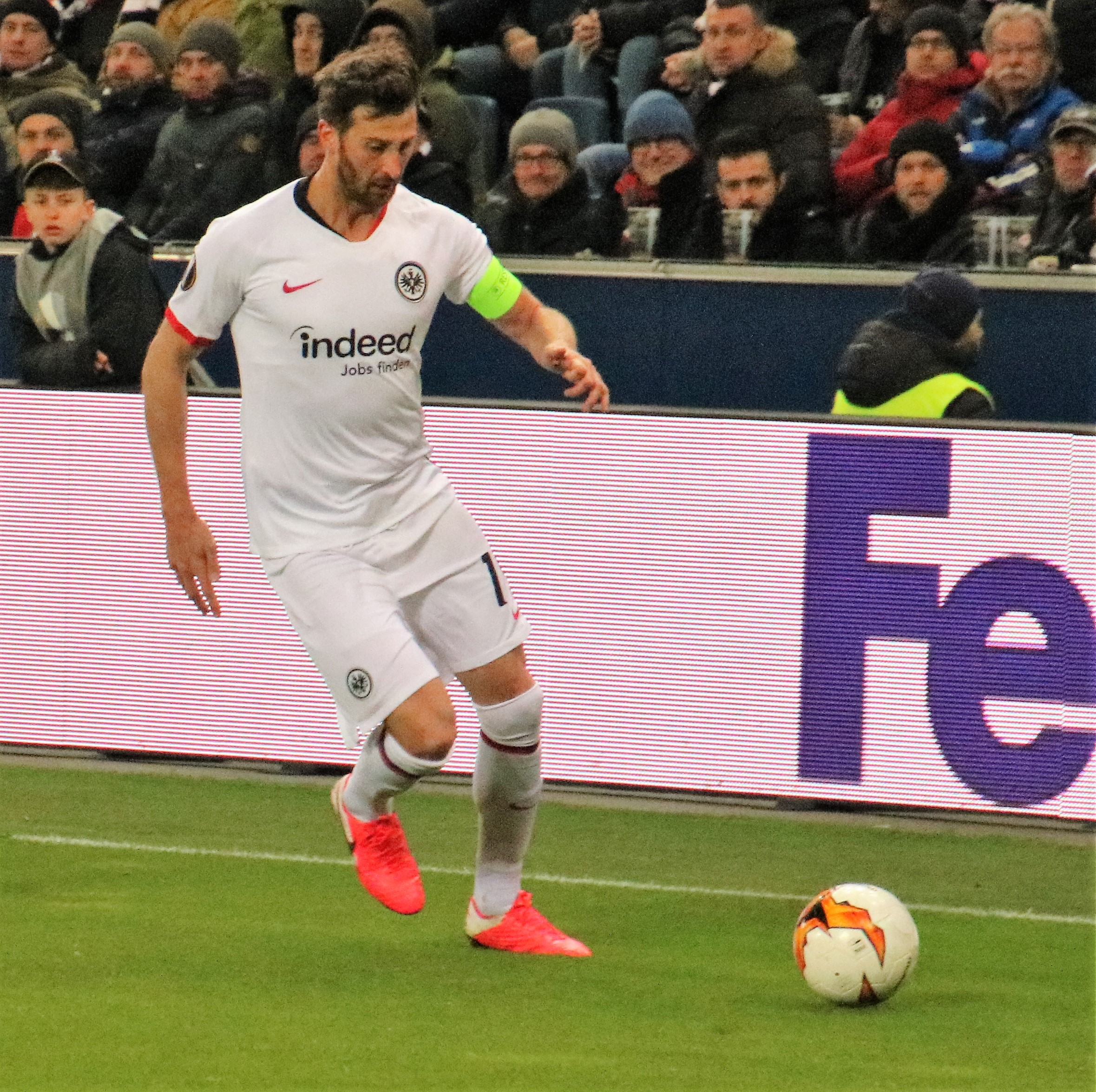
Abraham playing for Eintracht Frankfurt in 2020

Born in Chabás, Argentina, Abraham began his career with Independiente in 2004, becoming a first-team regular during his first season. At this time, he was called up to the Argentina squad to play at the 2005 FIFA World Youth Championship in the Netherlands. Argentina won the tournament with a squad that included Sergio Agüero, Fernando Gago, and Lionel Messi.

=== Gimnàstic ===
In 2007, Abraham moved to Gimnàstic de Tarragona in the Spanish second division. But after failing to gain promotion to La Liga he left the club.

=== FC Basel ===
On 8 July 2008, Swiss champions FC Basel announced that they had signed Abraham on a four-year contract. He joined Basel's first team for their 2008–09 season under head coach Christian Gross. To the beginning of the 2008–09 season Abraham was member of the Basel team that won the Uhrencup. They beat Legia Warsaw 6–1 and Abraham played in the 2–2 draw with Borussia Dortmund to end the table on top slot above Dortmund and Luzern. After playing in two test games Abraham played his domestic league debut for his new club in the away game in the Stadion Wankdorf on 18 July 2008 as Basel won 2–1 against Young Boys.

Basel joined the 2008–09 UEFA Champions League in the second qualifying round and with an aggregate score of 5–3 they eliminated IFK Göteborg. In the next round they played against Vitória de Guimarães. The first leg ended in a goalless draw, but with a 2–1 win in the second leg they eliminated Vitória and advanced to the group stage. Here Basel were matched with Barcelona, Sporting CP and Shakhtar Donetsk. Abraham scored his first goal for his new club on 16 September 2008 in the home game in the St. Jakob-Park as Basel were defeated 2–1 by Shakhtar. However, they ended the group in last position winning just one point after a 1–1 draw in Camp Nou. At the end of the 2008–09 Super League season Basel were third in the table, seven points behind new champions Zürich and one adrift of runners-up Young Boys. In the 2008–09 Swiss Cup Basel advanced via Schötz, Bulle, Thun and Zürich to the semi-finals. But here they were stopped by Young Boys. After a goalless 90 minutes and extra time, YB decided the penalty shoot-out 3–2 and advanced to the final to become runners-up, as Sion became cup winners.

Basel joined the 2009–10 UEFA Europa League in the second qualifying round. Basel advanced to the group stage, in which despite winning three of the six games the ended in third position and were eliminated. They finished four points behind group winners Roma and one behind Fulham, against whom they lost 3–2 in the last game of the stage. Abraham had six European appearances. At the end of the 2009–10 season he won the double with his club. They won the league Championship title with three points advantage over second placed Young Boys. Abraham had 21 league appearances. In the Swiss Cup via SC Cham, FC Le Mont, Zürich, FC Biel-Bienne and in the semi-final SC Kriens, Basel advanced to the final, and winning this 6–0 against Lausanne-Sport they won the competition. Abraham had four appearances in the cup

Basel started in the 2010–11 UEFA Champions League third qualifying round and advanced to the group stage, but ended the group in third position. Therefore, they dropped to the 2010–11 Europa League knockout phase, but here they were eliminated by Spartak Moscow due to a last minute goal against them. Abraham played in all 12 of theses matches. He scored his first league goal for the team on 24 July 2010 in the last minute of the away game against Sion to give his club a 2–1 victory. With Basel, Abraham won his second Swiss Championship at the end of the 2010–11 season, topping the table just one point clear of rivals Zürich.

To the beginning of their 2011–12 season Abraham was member of the Basel team that won the 2011 Uhrencup, beating both Hertha Berlin 3–0 and West Ham United 2–1 to lead the table on goal difference above Young Boys. At the end of the 2011–12 season he won the double for the second time with his team club. They won the league Championship title with 20 points advantage. In the Swiss Cup Basel advanced to the final, beating FC Eschenbach, Schötz, Wil, Lausanne-Sport and in the semi-final Winterthur. In the final they played against Luzern and the game ended 1–1 after extra time. Basel won the cup by beating their opponents 4–3 in the penalty shootout.

Despite the offer from the club, Abraham did not renew his contract and therefore he left the club. Between the years 2008 and 2012 Abraham played a total of 206 games for Basel scoring a total of 13 goals. 105 of these games were in the Swiss Super League, 11 in the Swiss Cup, 34 in the UEFA competitions (Champions League and Europa League) and 56 were friendly games. He scored eight goals in the domestic league, one in the Champions League and the other four were scored during the test games.

=== Getafe ===
On 29 May 2012, it was confirmed that Abraham has agreed to join Getafe on a four-year contract.

=== TSG Hoffenheim ===
In January 2013, Abraham agreed to join German side Hoffenheim,

=== Eintracht Frankfurt ===
He moved to Eintracht Frankfurt in 2015. He served as their captain, and was sent off during a match on 10 November 2019 after pushing over SC Freiburg manager Christian Streich. As a result, Abraham was issued a seven-week ban and was fined €25,000 by the German Football Association.

Abraham played his last match for Eintracht Frankfurt on 17 January 2021 in a 3–1 victory against Schalke, following which he returned to Argentina to sign for hometown club Huracán de Chabás.

== Honours ==
Gimnàstic

- Copa Catalunya: 2008

Basel

- Swiss Super League: 2009–10, 2010–11, 2011–12
- Swiss Cup: 2009–10, 2011–12
- Uhrencup: 2008, 2011

Eintracht Frankfurt

- DFB-Pokal: 2017–18

Argentina U20

- FIFA U-20 World Cup: 2005
