= João Alves (footballer, born 1980) =

Portuguese footballer

Personal information
- Full name: João Artur Rosa Alves
- Date of birth: 18 August 1980 (age 46)
- Place of birth: Chaves, Portugal
- Height: 1.79 m (5 ft 10 in)
- Position: Midfielder

Youth career
- 1989–1998: Chaves

Senior career*
Years	Team	Apps	(Gls)
1998–2004	Chaves	152	(17)
2004–2005	Braga	22	(4)
2005–2007	Sporting CP	25	(1)
2007–2012	Vitória Guimarães	118	(3)
2012–2013	Omonia	14	(1)
2013–2014	Académico Viseu	29	(4)
2014–2015	Freamunde	1	(0)
Total		361	(30)

International career
1999	Portugal U18	2	(0)
2005	Portugal	3	(0)
- * Club domestic league appearances and goals

João Artur Rosa Alves (born 18 August 1980) is a Portuguese former professional footballer who played as a central midfielder.

== Club career ==
Born in Chaves, Alves started his senior career at his hometown club G.D. Chaves, making his debut in the Primeira Liga on 15 November 1998 in a 1–2 home loss against U.D. Leiria after coming in as a substitute in the 63rd minute. He appeared in a further nine league matches during that season, with the northerners eventually being relegated after finishing 17th.

In 2004–05, having spent five additional campaigns with Chaves in the Segunda Liga, Alves joined S.C. Braga, his first league appearance occurring on 14 November 2004 in a 0–0 draw at Leiria. After some solid performances to help the Minho to the fourth position, he moved to Sporting CP on a three-year contract.

After appearing just twice for Sporting in 2006–07, Alves signed a three-year deal with Vitória S.C. in July 2007, with Sporting keeping half of the player's rights. In his first year, he only missed one league game as his team came straight from the second division into a final third place.

Alves made an average of 23 league appearances in the following three seasons, and on 20 June 2011 he replaced veteran Flávio Meireles as club captain.

== International career ==
On 17 August 2005, Alves made his debut for the Portugal national team, making an assist for Hélder Postiga in a 2–0 friendly win over Egypt.

== Career statistics ==
=== Club ===
Club	Season	League			Cup		Other		Total	
Club	Season	Division	Apps	Goals	Apps	Goals	Apps	Goals	Apps	Goals
Chaves	1998–99	Primeira Liga	10	0	0	0	—		10	0
Chaves	1999–2000	Segunda Liga	21	0	1	0	—		22	0
Chaves	2000–01	Segunda Liga	27	6	0	0	—		27	6
Chaves	2001–02	Segunda Liga	31	5	1	0	—		32	5
Chaves	2002–03	Segunda Liga	33	3	3	1	—		36	4
Chaves	2003–04	Segunda Liga	30	2	1	0	—		31	2
Chaves	Total		152	17	6	1	—		158	18
Braga	2004–05	Primeira Liga	20	4	2	0	—		22	4
Braga	2005–06	Primeira Liga	2	0	0	0	—		2	0
Braga	Total		22	4	2	0	—		24	4
Sporting CP	2005–06	Primeira Liga	23	1	3	0	2 (Note: Appearances in UEFA Cup/UEFA Europa League)	0	28	1
Sporting CP	2006–07	Primeira Liga	2	0	0	0	1 (Note: Appearance in UEFA Champions League)	0	3	0
Sporting CP	Total		25	1	3	0	3	0	31	1
Vitória Guimarães	2007–08	Primeira Liga	29	0	5	1	—		34	1
Vitória Guimarães	2008–09	Primeira Liga	25	1	8	0	4 (Note: Appearances in UEFA Champions League and UEFA Cup)	1	37	2
Vitória Guimarães	2009–10	Primeira Liga	22	0	6	0	—		28	0
Vitória Guimarães	2010–11	Primeira Liga	22	2	8	0	—		30	2
Vitória Guimarães	2011–12	Primeira Liga	20	0	3	0	3	0	26	0
Vitória Guimarães	Total		118	3	30	1	7	1	155	5
Omonia	2012–13	Cypriot First Division	14	1	4	2	1	0	19	3
Académico Viseu	2013–14	Segunda Liga	29	4	1	0	—		30	4
Freamunde	2014–15	Segunda Liga	1	0	2	0	—		3	0
Career total			361	30	48	4	11	1	420	35

== Honours ==
Sporting CP

- Taça de Portugal: 2006–07

Omonia

- Cypriot Super Cup: 2012

Portugal

- UEFA European Under-19 Championship: 1999
