= Jürgen Gjasula =

Albanian-German footballer

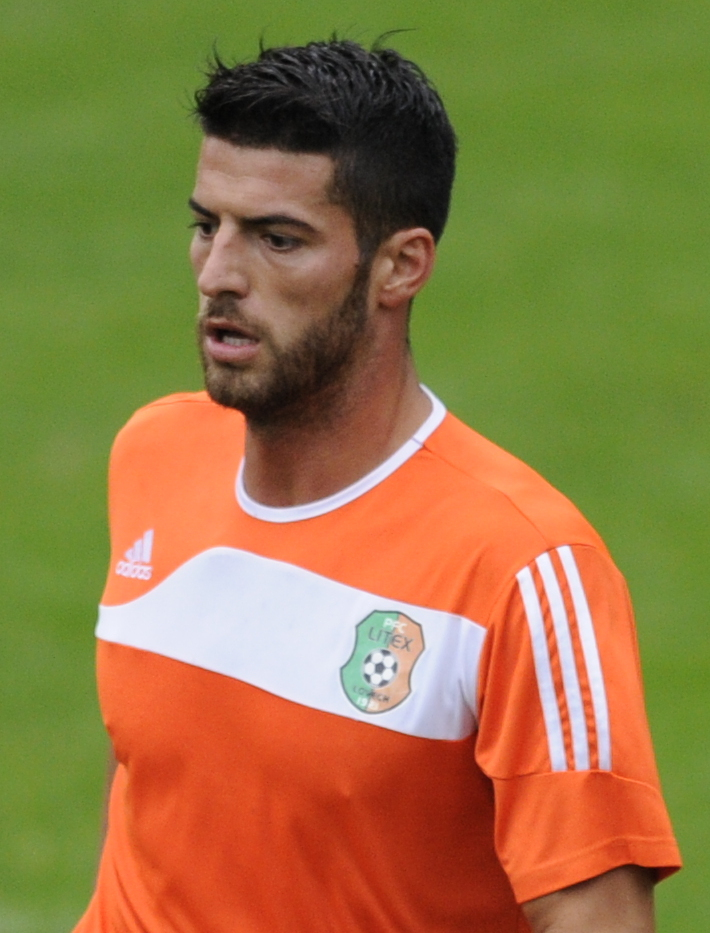
- Gjasula with Litex Lovech in 2013

Personal information
- Full name: Jürgen Fatmir Gjasula
- Date of birth: 5 December 1985 (age 40)
- Place of birth: Tirana, Albania
- Height: 1.89 m (6 ft 2 in)
- Position: Attacking midfielder

Youth career
- 2000–2004: SC Freiburg

Senior career*
Years	Team	Apps	(Gls)
2003–2004	SC Freiburg II	22	(4)
2003	SC Freiburg	0	(0)
2004–2005	1. FC Kaiserslautern	7	(0)
2004–2005	1. FC Kaiserslautern II	6	(2)
2005–2008	St. Gallen	88	(7)
2008–2009	Basel	19	(1)
2009–2011	FSV Frankfurt	60	(9)
2011–2013	MSV Duisburg	38	(3)
2013	MSV Duisburg II	2	(0)
2013–2014	Litex Lovech	24	(9)
2014–2015	VfR Aalen	26	(6)
2015–2018	Greuther Fürth	67	(7)
2017	Greuther Fürth II	1	(0)
2018–2019	Viktoria Berlin	9	(1)
2019	Energie Cottbus	16	(3)
2019–2021	1. FC Magdeburg	45	(8)
2021–2023	Berliner AK 07	42	(7)

International career
2013	Albania	2	(0)
- * Club domestic league appearances and goals as of 18:30, 4 July 2024 (UTC)

Jürgen Fatmir Gjasula (born 5 December 1985) is an Albanian professional footballer who plays as an attacking midfielder. He also holds German citizenship.

== Club career ==
=== Early life and SC Freiburg ===
Gjasula was born in Tirana, Albania, and is the elder brother of Klaus Gjasula, who was also born there. Shortly after Klaus's birth, the family emigrated to Freiburg, Germany, where both brothers grew up. Their given names were inspired by the German actor Klausjürgen Wussow, who portrayed Professor Klaus Brinkmann in the popular 1980s television series The Black Forest Clinic (Die Schwarzwaldklinik). According to reports, their grandmother was a devoted fan of the show and chose both names in tribute to the actor. Growing up in Freiburg, Gjasula joined the youth academy of SC Freiburg in 2002. At the age of 17, he was promoted to the first team but did not make any senior appearances during the 2003–04 season.

=== 1. FC Kaiserslautern ===
Gjasula signed for 1. FC Kaiserslautern in 2004 and made it a total of seven appearances in one season.

==== St. Gallen (loan) ====
In 2005, Gjasula was loaned in club FC St. Gallen on Swiss Super League. At first season with St Gallen, he became a box-to-box goalscoring threat and typical number 10 so he signed a contract in 2006.

=== FC Basel ===
On 2 June 2008, it was announced that Gjasula, as a free agent, had signed for Swiss Champions FC Basel. He joined Basel's first team for their 2008–09 season under head coach Christian Gross. Playing in his fifth pre-season game, Gjasula scored his first goal for Basel on 10 July 2008 in the Uhren Cup. It was the first goal of the game as Basel won 6–1 against Legia Warsaw. He scored his next goal in the next Uhren Cup match on 12 July, as Basel played a 2–2 draw with Borussia Dortmund to win the Uhren Cup that year. Gjasula played his domestic league debut for the club in the away game in the Stade de Suisse, Wankdorf on 18 July as Basel won 2–1 against Young Boys.

Basel joined the 2008–09 UEFA Europa League in the second qualifying round. Gjasula played his first European game in a Basel shirt on 30 July 2008 in a 1–1 Champions League Qualifying match draw against IFK Göteborg at Ullevi. Gjasula took a corner-kick in the 26th minute and Benjamin Huggel headed home, for the guests to take the lead, but the Swedish team equalised just six minutes later. With an aggregate score of 5–3 they eliminated Göteborg. In the next round they played against Vitória de Guimarães. The first leg ended in a goalless draw, but with a 2–1 win in the second leg they eliminated Vitória and advanced to the group stage. Here Basel were matched with Barcelona, Sporting CP and Shakhtar Donetsk, but ended the group in last position winning just one point after a 1–1 draw in Camp Nou.

In the 2008–09 Swiss Cup Basel advanced via Schötz 1–0, Bulle 4–1 (one goal Gjasula), Thun 4–0 (one goal Gjasula) and Zurich 1–0 to the semi-finals. But here they were stopped by Young Boys. After a goalless 90 minutes and extra time YB decided the match in the penalty shoot-out 3–2. Here Gjasula was one of three Basel players who didn't hit the target with their spot-kicks. YB advanced to the final to become runners-up, as Sion became cup winners. At the end of the 2008–09 Super League season Basel were third in the table, seven points behind new champions Zürich and one adrift of runners-up Young Boys. However, as the season progressed, Gjasula became less and less playing time. On 18 June 2009, his contract was terminated by the club, after the newly appointed manager Thorsten Fink decided to plan without him. During his time with the club, Gjasula played a total of 43 games for Basel scoring a total of nine goals. 19 of these games were in the Swiss Super League, five in the Swiss Cup, four in the Champions League and 15 were friendly games. He scored two goals in the domestic league, two in the cup and the other five were scored during the test games. Gjasula stayed by the club, with individual training, to keep fit, until he found a new club. At the end of August it was announced that he had found a new employer.

=== FSV Frankfurt ===
Gjasula signed on 31 August 2009 for FSV Frankfurt where he made it a total of 60 appearances and scored nine goals in two seasons with club.

=== MSV Duisburg ===
In July 2011, he signed for MSV Duisburg.

=== Litex Lovech ===
On 5 July 2013, Gjasula signed with Bulgarian club Litex Lovech, rejoining his compatriot and fellow Albanian international player Armando Vajushi. He established himself as a player in the squad, providing several goals for the start of the club.

Gjasula scored the third goal from the penalty spot in the 2–4 away victory on 20 October 2013 against Ludogorets Razgrad. A week later, on 27 October, he scored the second goal in the 90th minute of a 0–2 victory over Neftochimic Burgas.

Litex finished first stage of the 2013–14 season as runners-up. They played the last match on 9 March 2014 against winners of the league Ludogorets Razgrad trailing by one point and drew the match 0–0. For the regular season Gjasula made 26 appearances including 3 in the Bulgarian Cup, scoring 11 goals of which 9 came in the league. He finished in 8th place on the league's top scorers table, while making 8 assists positioning in fourth place on league's table of top assists.

Gjasula finished the 2013–14 season scoring in total 11 goals (including 2 in the Bulgarian Cup) in 35 appearances and Litex ranked 3rd in the league table, gaining entry to play in the UEFA Europa League for the next season.

With coming of the new coach Miodrag Ješić, Gjasula was not anymore in the club plans as they announced that would not renew his one-year contract. On 4 June 2014, Turkish side Bursaspor announced that they were looking for an attacking midfielder and that Gjasula was an option.

=== VfR Aalen ===
On 10 September 2014, Gjasula signed with 2. Bundesliga side VfR Aalen a contract until June 2015.

=== Greuther Fürth ===
On 7 June 2015, it was announced, that Gjasula had signed a contract with Greuther Fürth.

=== Viktoria Berlin ===
On 30 September 2018, Gjasula signed with Viktoria Berlin and got shirt number 18.

=== Energie Cottbus ===
On 31 January 2019, Gjasula joined Energie Cottbus on a short-term deal.

=== 1. FC Magdeburg ===
Gjasula left Energie Cottbus at the end of the 2018–19 season and instead joined 1. FC Magdeburg for the 2019–20 season on a one-year contract.

=== Berliner AK 07 ===
Gjasula joined Berliner AK 07 of the Regionalliga Nordost in September 2021.

== International career ==
Gjasula decided to play for Albania national football team in May 2013. He received an Albanian passport on 24 May 2013 among other compatriots, Amir Abrashi, Vullnet Basha, Azdren Llullaku and Ilir Berisha and so he was able to play on international games. He received his first call-up by coach Gianni De Biasi for 2 matches against Norway on 22 March 2013, valid for the 2014 FIFA World Cup qualification and the friendly against Lithuania on 26 March 2013. He made his debut on 14 August in a friendly-match against Armenia by coming as a substitute in place of Odise Roshi in the 56th minute.

== Personal life ==
Gjasula was born in the capital of Albania, Tirana and raised in Freiburg, Germany. His younger brother Klaus Gjasula is a footballer who plays as a defensive midfielder.

== Career statistics ==
=== Club ===
As of 1 August 2020

Appearances and goals by club, season and competition
Club	Season	League			Cup		Europe		Other		Total	
Club	Season	Division	Apps	Goals	Apps	Goals	Apps	Goals	Apps	Goals	Apps	Goals
SC Freiburg II	2003–04	Oberliga Baden-Württemberg	22	4	—		—		—		22	4
SC Freiburg	2003–04	Bundesliga	0	0	0	0	—		—		0	0
1. FC Kaiserslautern	2004–05	Bundesliga	7	0	—		—		—		7	0
1. FC Kaiserslautern II	2004–05	Oberliga Rheinland-Pfalz/Saar	6	2	—		—		—		6	2
St. Gallen	2005–06	Swiss Super League	30	1	2	0	—		—		32	1
St. Gallen	2006–07	Swiss Super League	33	0	4	1	—		—		37	1
St. Gallen	2007–08	Swiss Super League	25	6	2	0	2 (Note: All appearances in 2007 UEFA Intertoto Cup)	0	—		29	6
St. Gallen	Total		88	7	8	1	2	0	—		98	8
Basel	2008–09	Swiss Super League	19	2	5	2	4 (Note: All appearances in 2008–09 UEFA Champions League)	0	—		28	4
FSV Frankfurt	2009–10	2. Bundesliga	28	5	—		—		—		28	5
FSV Frankfurt	2012–13	2. Bundesliga	32	6	2	0	—		—		34	6
FSV Frankfurt	Total		60	11	2	0	—		—		62	11
MSV Duisburg	2011–12	2. Bundesliga	30	3	1	0	—		—		31	3
MSV Duisburg	2012–13	2. Bundesliga	8	0	—		—		—		8	0
MSV Duisburg	Total		38	3	1	0	—		—		39	3
MSV Duisburg II	2012–13	Regionalliga West	2	0	—		—		—		2	0
Litex Lovech	2013–14	A Group	24	9	5	2	—		6 (Note: All appearances in 2013–14 A Group - Championship Group)	0	35	11
VfR Aalen	2014–15	2. Bundesliga	26	6	2	0	—		—		28	6
Greuther Fürth	2015–16	2. Bundesliga	29	5	1	0	—		—		30	5
Greuther Fürth	2016–17	2. Bundesliga	12	0	—		—		—		12	0
Greuther Fürth	2017–18	2. Bundesliga	26	2	2	0	—		—		28	2
Greuther Fürth	Total		67	7	3	0	—		—		70	7
Greuther Fürth II	2016–17	Regionalliga Bayern	1	0	—		—		—		1	0
Viktoria Berlin	2018–19	Regionalliga Nordost	9	1	0	0	—		—		9	1
Energie Cottbus	2018–19	3. Liga	16	3	0	0	—		—		16	3
1. FC Magdeburg	2019–20	3. Liga	31	6	1	0	—		—		32	6
Career total			416	61	27	5	6	0	6	0	455	66

=== International ===
As of 10 September 2013

Appearances and goals by national team and year
National team	Year	Apps	Goals
Albania	2013	2	0
Total		2	0

== Honours ==
Basel

- Uhrencup: 2008
