= Oliver Stöckli =

Swiss footballer (born 1976)

Personal information
- Date of birth: 28 December 1976 (age 49)
- Place of birth: Muri, Switzerland
- Height: 1.87 m (6 ft 1 1/2 in)
- Position: Goalkeeper

Team information
- Current team: FC Basel (youth coach)

Youth career
- FC Muri AG

Senior career*
| Years | Team | Apps | (Gls) |
| 1994–1998 | FC Basel | 7 | (0) |
| 1998–1999 | FC Baden | 2 | (0) |
| 1999–2000 | FC Basel | 1 | (0) |
| 2000–2001 | FC Winterthur | 0 | (0) |
| 2001–2002 | FC St. Gallen | 44 | (0) |
| 2002–2003 | AC Lugano | 0 | (0) |
| 2003–2004 | FC Sion | 2 | (0) |
| 2004–2005 | FC Concordia Basel | 2 | (0) |
| 2005–2006 | FC Aarau | 12 | (0) |
| 2006–2008 | FC Winterthur | 43 | (0) |
| 2008 | → FC Basel (loan) | 0 | (0) |
| 2008–2009 | FC Basel | 3 | (0) |
| 1994–2009 | Total | 116 | (0 ) |

International career^{‡}
| 1994–1995 | Switzerland U-19 | 10 | (0) |
- * Club domestic league appearances and goals as of 14 December 2008 ‡ National team caps and goals as of 28 July 2006

Oliver Stöckli (born 28 December 1976) is a Swiss former footballer who played as a goalkeeper throughout the 1990s and 2000s. He is currently a youth coach at FC Basel.

== Football career ==
Stöckli came through the ranks at FC Basel and signed a professional contract with the club in 1996. Despite looking to have a bright future there, he left for FC Winterthur in January 2000. He found first team opportunities few and far between at Winterthur, however, and joined FC St. Gallen a season later where he became a first team regular at the relatively young age of 24. St. Gallen were relegated from the Swiss Super League in 2002 but Stöckli did not go down with them as he joined newly promoted club AC Lugano. After just one season at Lugano, which he spent mostly on the bench, he joined FC Sion. In the search for first team football he signed for FC Concordia Basel in 2004 and later FC Aarau in 2005 but was unsuccessful both times. He dropped down a division to sign for FC Winterthur for a second time in 2006 where he finally inherited the No. 1 jersey.

In February 2008 his former club, FC Basel, signed him on a short-term loan deal after their first team goalkeeper, Franco Costanzo, was injured during a UEFA Europa League match against Sporting Clube de Portugal. He did not make any appearances at St. Jakob-Park and returned to Winterthur in May 2008. On 15 August 2008, he rejoined FC Basel on a permanent contract after former reserve goalkeeper, Louis Crayton, departed to D.C. United. He was also a goalkeeping coach at FC Basel. He retired at the end of the 2008/09 season and became a youth coach at Basel.
