= Santiago Kuhl =

Argentine footballer

Personal information
- Full name: Santiago Jorge Kuhl
- Date of birth: 21 October 1981 (age 45)
- Place of birth: Buenos Aires, Argentina
- Height: 1.83 m (6 ft 0 in)
- Position: Midfielder

Senior career*
Years	Team	Apps	(Gls)
1999–2002	Argentinos Juniors	19	(2)
2002–2003	FC Baden	31	(16)
2003–2004	CD Leganés	16	(1)
2004	AD Ceuta		
2005	FC Baden	15	(6)
2005–2006	FC Lucerne	29	(1)
2006–2007	Argentinos Juniors	1	(0)
2007–2009	FC Locarno	7	(0)

International career
	Argentina U-20	10	(4)
- * Club domestic league appearances and goals as of May 1, 2008

Santiago Jorge Kuhl (born 21 October 1981 in Buenos Aires) is an Argentine footballer.
