= Samet Gündüz =

Swiss footballer (born 1987)

Personal information
- Date of birth: 13 September 1987 (age 39)
- Place of birth: Switzerland
- Height: 1.76 m (5 ft 9 in)
- Position: Midfielder

Youth career
- Concordia

Senior career*
Years	Team	Apps	(Gls)
2005–2008	FC Basel U-21	60	(11)
2008–2010	FC Basel	0	(0)
2008	→ FC Wil (loan)	12	(1)
2009	→ Concordia (loan)	11	(0)
2010	→ FC Thun (loan)	9	(0)
- * Club domestic league appearances and goals as of 07:21, 19 June 2019 (UTC)

Samet Gündüz (born 13 September 1987) is a Swiss former professional footballer who played as a midfielder.

== Career ==
Gündüz came through the youth system at FC Concordia Basel before joining FC Basel in 2005. He scored eleven goals in sixty appearances for Basel's under-21 squad. During the 2008/09 season, he was loaned out to FC Wil, For Wil he played twelve games and scored one goal. Later in the season, he was loaned out to Concordia. There, he played eleven matches.
