= João Fajardo =

Portuguese footballer (born 1978)

Personal information
- Full name: João Paulo Silva Freitas Fajardo
- Date of birth: 27 October 1978 (age 48)
- Place of birth: Lisbon, Portugal
- Height: 1.80 m (5 ft 11 in)
- Position: Winger

Youth career
- 1989–1997: Belenenses

Senior career*
Years	Team	Apps	(Gls)
1997–1999	Pescadores		
1999–2001	Atlético	37	(13)
2001–2003	Belenenses	9	(0)
2003–2007	Naval	126	(18)
2007–2009	Vitória Guimarães	54	(8)
2009–2010	Panthrakikos	18	(2)
2010	→ Belenenses (loan)	10	(0)
2010–2011	Santa Clara	18	(1)
2011–2013	Farense	42	(8)
Total		314	(50)
- * Club domestic league appearances and goals

João Paulo Silva Freitas Fajardo (born 27 October 1978) is a Portuguese retired professional footballer who played as a winger.

He amassed Primeira Liga totals of 132 matches and nine goals over seven seasons, mainly in representation of Naval and Vitória de Guimarães (two years apiece). He also appeared in the competition for Belenenses.

== Club career ==
Born in Lisbon, Fajardo started playing professional football with modest Grupo Desportivo dos Pescadores in Costa da Caparica. He went on to have two-year stints with both Atlético Clube de Portugal and C.F. Os Belenenses, then played four full seasons with Associação Naval 1º de Maio, helping the Figueira da Foz club promote to the Primeira Liga in 2005 with a career-best ten goals in 33 games.

In 2007–08, already with Vitória de Guimarães, Fajardo scored four league goals in the first five matches as the team from Minho eventually achieved an historic qualification to the UEFA Champions League, finishing third straight out of the second division. His league totals during the campaign consisted of five goals in 27 appearances, 14 as a substitute.

In late July 2009, at the age of nearly 31, Fajardo started a career abroad, moving to Greece's Panthrakikos FC. However, in late January 2010, he agreed on a return to his country, being loaned to former side Belenenses until the end of the season in an eventual relegation as last.
