= Marco Streller =

Swiss footballer (born 1981)

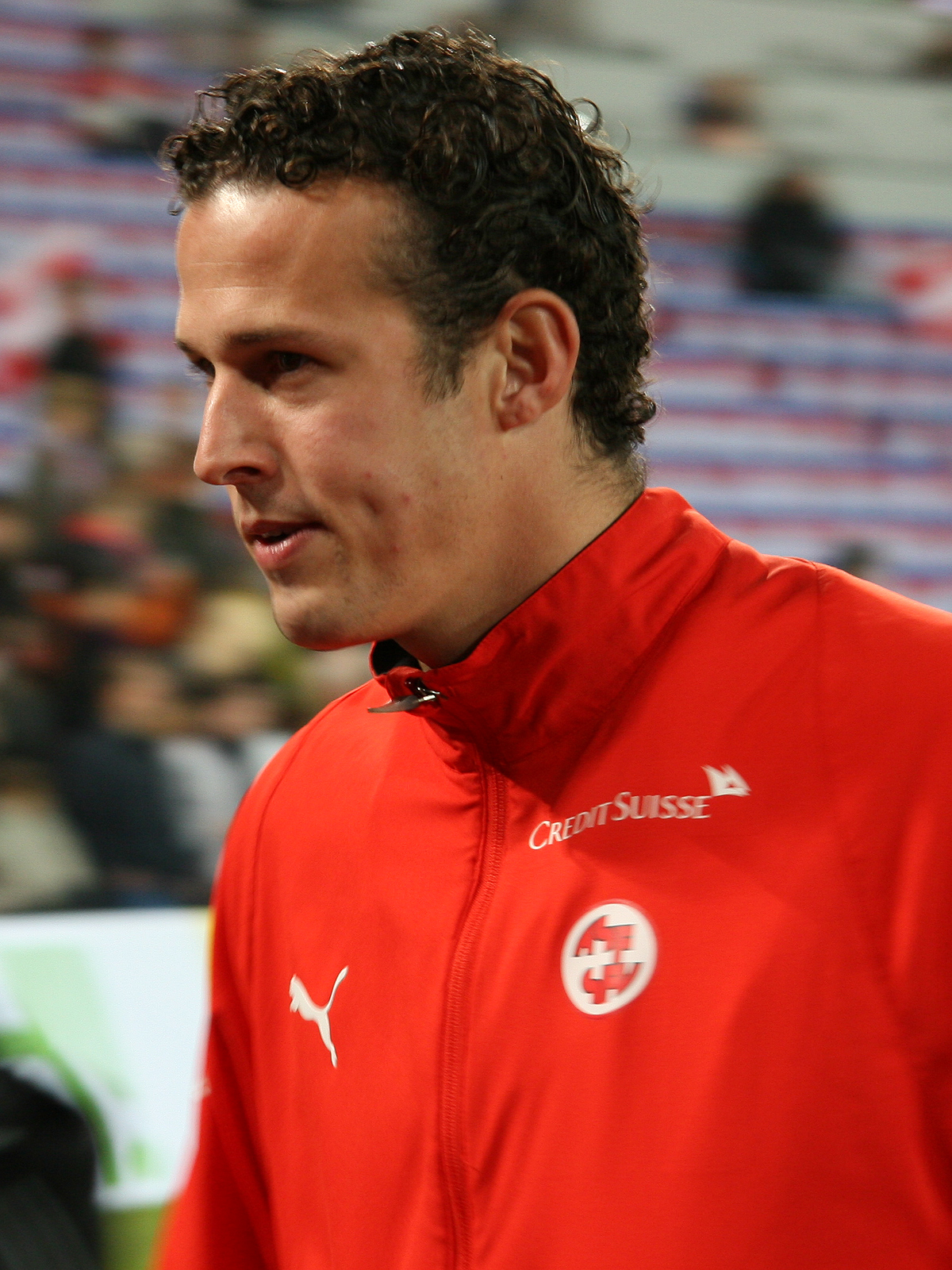
- Streller in 2006

Personal information
- Full name: Marco Streller
- Date of birth: 18 June 1981 (age 45)
- Place of birth: Basel, Switzerland
- Height: 1.95 m (6 ft 5 in)
- Position: Forward

Youth career
- 1988–1997: FC Aesch
- 1997–2000: FC Arlesheim

Senior career*
Years	Team	Apps	(Gls)
2000–2004	Basel	20	(13)
2001–2002	→ Concordia Basel (loan)	30	(16)
2002–2003	→ Thun (loan)	16	(8)
2004–2007	VfB Stuttgart	55	(9)
2006	→ 1. FC Köln (loan)	14	(3)
2007–2015	Basel	213	(98)
Total		348	(147)

International career
2001–2002	Switzerland U-20	3	(0)
2002–2003	Switzerland U-21	13	(6)
2003–2011	Switzerland	37	(12)

Managerial career
- 2015–2017: Basel (sporting adviser)
- 2017–2019: Basel (sporting director)
- * Club domestic league appearances and goals

Marco Streller (born 18 June 1981) is a Swiss former footballer who played as a striker and is best known for his years with FC Basel and the Switzerland national team. He was the sporting director of FC Basel from June 2017 until June 2019. Since February 2020 he works as a TV expert for the Swiss Pay TV broadcaster Teleclub.

== Club career ==
=== Youth football ===
Streller was born in Basel and began his youth football with local club FC Aesch, coming through the ranks between 1988 and 1997. He then played three seasons for FC Arlesheim in the 2. Liga.

=== Basel ===
Streller started his professional football career with local club FC Basel under manager Christian Gross in 2000. He played his League debut in St. Jakob-Park being substituted in during the 66th Minute at St. Jakob-Park on 11 July 2001 in the 3–1 home win against Servette. In the last minute of the game he scored an own goal, a deflected header, after Servette had taken the last corner kick.

=== Loan to Concordia and Thun ===
This was to remain Streller's only game for Basel during this season because he was loaned to feeder club FC Concordia Basel for the rest of the season. He scored 16 goals in 30 starts in the Nationalliga B with Concordia, which made his home club and Gross sit up and take notice. They called him back in 2002, but after playing just three games was loaned out again in January of the following year to FC Thun. He scored eight goals in just 16 games for Thun and was subsequently recalled to Basel, being promised first team football.

=== Basel ===
During the 2003–04 Swiss Super League season, he scored 13 goals in 16 games, thus gathering the interest of a handful of Bundesliga clubs including VfB Stuttgart.

=== VfB Stuttgart and 1. FC Köln ===
Stuttgart eventually signed him ahead of the 2004–05 season. During his debut on 14 March 2005 he also scored his first goal for the VfB. But after returning from an injury he scored just four goals in 28 matches in his two years in Stuttgart. Therefore, and to gain match practice, he was loaned out to 1. FC Köln for their second half of the 2006 season. After returning from Köln, where he made 14 starts, he scored five goals in 27 games as Stuttgart won the Championship, but Streller still failed to impress the Stuttgart board of directors.

=== Basel ===
Stuttgart therefore allowed Streller to rejoin his boyhood heroes FC Basel on a free transfer in June 2007. This was his fourth spell at the club and it turned out to be very successful. He was Basel's top goal-scorer during the 2007–08 season with twelve league goals and 16 goals in all competitions. In the last game of the season Valentin Stocker and Marco Streller scored the two goals in Basels 2–0 home win over BSC Young Boys and Basel won the championship.

Streller missed the start of the 2008–09 season after returning from UEFA Euro 2008 injured. He playing his first game of the season in a 1–0 Swiss Cup win over FC Schötz on 20 September 2008. During the 2008–09 Swiss Super League season Streller played 23 league games, scoring six goals, but Basel finished just third in the League table, qualifying for the Europa League. In the 2009–10 season Streller played 29 League games, scoring 21 goals, and Basel won the Double. In the 2010–11 season Basel were able to defend the League Title, thus Streller won his fourth Swiss League Medal.

For the 2011–12 Swiss Super League season trainer Thorsten Fink named Marco Streller as team captain. He scored his first UEFA Champions League goal for Basel on 22 November in the Group C tie in the Arena Națională, in Bucharest, as Basel won the away game against Oțelul Galați 3–2. At the end of the 2011–12 season, Streller won the Double, the League Championship title and the Swiss Cup with Basel.

At the end of the 2012–13 Swiss Super League season Streller won the Championship title for the fourth time in a row and was Swiss Cup runner up with Basel. In the 2012–13 UEFA Europa League Basel advanced as far as the semi-finals, there being matched against the reigning UEFA Champions League holders Chelsea, but were knocked out being beaten 5–2 on aggregate. In a very long season Basel played a total of 76 games (36 in the domestic League, six in the Cup, 20 in Champions und Europa League, as well as 14 Test matches). Streller made 62 appearances, of which 32 were in der domestic League, three in the Cup and 17 in the Champions League and Europa League.

On 18 September 2013, he headed the winning goal away to Chelsea in the opening group game of the 2013–14 UEFA Champions League. At the end of the 2013–14 Super League season, Streller won his seventh league championship with Basel (fifth time in a row). They also reached the final of the 2013–14 Swiss Cup, but were beaten 2–0 by Zürich after extra time. In the 2013–14 Champions League season, Basel finished in the group stage in third position to qualify for Europa League knockout phase and here they advanced as far as the quarter-finals. In their season 2013–14, with Murat Yakin as trainer, Basel played a total of 68 matches (36 Swiss Super League fixtures, six Swiss Cup, ten Champions League and six Europa League and ten test matches). Streler totaled 44 appearances, 25 in the Super League, three in the Cup, eight Champions League and two Europa League appearances, as well six in the test games. He totaled 18 goals in these matches, of which ten were scored in the Super League, one in the Champions League and two in the Europa League.

The season 2014–15 was a very successful one for Basel and their captain Marco Streller. The championship was won for the sixth time in a row that season and in the 2014–15 Swiss Cup they reached the final. But for the third season in a row, they finished as runners-up, losing 3–0 to FC Sion in the final. Basel entered the Champions League in the group stage and reached the knockout phase as on 9 December 2014 they managed a 1–1 draw at Anfield against Liverpool. But then Basel then lost to Porto in the Round of 16. Basel played a total of 65 matches (36 Swiss League fixtures, six Swiss Cup, 8 Champions League and 15 test matches). Under trainer Paulo Sousa Streller totaled 40 appearances, 24 League, one Cup, five Champions League, as well 10 in test games. He scored 20 goals in these matches.

At the end of the 2014–15 FC Basel season Streller retired from professional football. Between the years 2000 to 2004 and again from 2007 to 2015 Streller played a total of 418 games for Basel scoring a total of 185 goals. 233 of these games were in the Swiss Super League, 22 in the Swiss Cup, 70 were in a UEFA European-competitions (Champions League, UEFA Cup Europa League and UIC) and 93 were friendly games. He scored 111 goals in the domestic league, nine in the domestic cup, 24 in European competitions and the other 41 were scored during the test games.

== International career ==
=== Youth international ===
Streller represented Switzerland at Under-20 and Under-21 levels. He played his Swiss U-20 debut on 7 November 2001 in the 1–3 away defeat against the Dutch U-20 team. His U-21 debut was on 21 August 2002 in the 1–0 home win against the Austrian U-21 team. He scored his first goal for the U-21 on 15 January 2003 in the 2–3 defeat against the German U-21, in fact during this game he scored both Swiss goals. Just four days later on 19 January 2003 he scored a hat-trick against the Qatar national under-23 football team as the Swiss won 3–1.

=== Full international ===
Streller played his debut as full international on 11 October 2003, being substituted in, during the 2–1 home win against the Republic of Ireland in the final match of the Group 10 qualifying match to the UEFA Euro 2004. Streller was in the squad for the UEFA Euro 2004, but pulled out due to injury.

During a 2006 WC qualifier against Turkey, he was lashed at and kicked by Turkey player Alpay Özalan. He played at the 2006 FIFA World Cup and during the tournament's final stage he missed a spot-kick during his side's penalty shootout against Ukraine, who emerged victorious.

His substitution in the last friendly game before the Euro 2008, against the Principality of Liechtenstein, was accompanied by catcalls from Swiss supporters, being dissatisfied with Streller's performance in that game. As a consequence, Streller announced his international retirement after the Euro 2008, citing he does not have "the full support of the fans". He was bashed about announcing such a move in front of the tournament not only by the Swiss press. Ottmar Hitzfeld, designated Swiss manager from July 2008, convinced Streller to continue his international career.

Streller scored Switzerland's second goal in a 4–1 victory against Wales in a Euro 2012 qualifier on 13 October 2010.

On 5 April 2011, he stepped down from the national team along with Alexander Frei, after being sharply criticised by home fans following a 0–0 draw with Bulgaria for the Euro 2012 qualifier.

== Career statistics ==
Scores and results list Switzerland's goal tally first, score column indicates score after each Streller goal.

List of international goals scored by Marco Streller
No.	Date	Venue	Opponent	Score	Result	Competition
1	16 November 2005	Şükrü Saracoğlu Stadium, Istanbul, Turkey	Turkey	2–3	2–4	2006 World Cup qualifier
2	3 June 2006	Hardturm, Zürich, Switzerland	China	2–0	4–1	Friendly
3	3 June 2006	Hardturm, Zürich, Switzerland	China	4–0	4–1	Friendly
4	6 September 2006	Stade de Genève, Geneva, Switzerland	Costa Rica	1–0	2–0	Friendly
5	11 October 2006	Tivoli-Neu, Innsbruck, Austria	Austria	1–2	1–2	Friendly
6	7 February 2007	Esprit Arena, Düsseldorf, Germany	Germany	1–3	1–3	Friendly
7	22 March 2007	Lockhart Stadium, Fort Lauderdale, United States	Jamaica	1–0	2–0	Friendly
8	2 June 2007	St. Jakob-Park, Basel, Switzerland	Argentina	1–1	1–1	Friendly
9	7 September 2007	Ernst-Happel-Stadion, Vienna, Austria	Chile	2–1	2–1	Friendly
10	13 October 2007	Letzigrund, Zürich, Switzerland	Austria	1–0	3–1	Friendly
11	13 October 2007	Letzigrund, Zürich, Switzerland	Austria	3–1	3–1	Friendly
12	12 October 2010	St. Jakob-Park, Basel, Switzerland	Wales	2–1	4–1	Euro 2012 qualifier

== Honours ==
Basel

- Swiss Super League: 2003–04, 2007–08, 2009–10, 2010–11, 2011–12, 2012–13, 2013–14, 2014–15
- Swiss Cup: 2007–08, 2009–10, 2011–12

VfB Stuttgart

- Bundesliga: 2006–07

Individual

- Swiss Super League Team of the Year: 2013–14, 2014–15

Sporting positions
Preceded by Franco Costanzo	FC Basel captain 2011–2015	Succeeded by Matías Delgado
