= Marco Ritzberger =

Liechtensteiner footballer

- Ritzberger in 2009

Personal information
- Date of birth: 27 December 1986 (age 39)
- Place of birth: Vaduz, Liechtenstein
- Height: 1.87 m (6 ft 2 in)
- Position: Defender

Youth career
- 1996–2005: FC Vaduz

Senior career*
Years	Team	Apps	(Gls)
2005–2012	FC Vaduz	121	(8)

International career^{‡}
2004–2012	Liechtenstein	35	(1)
- * Club domestic league appearances and goals as of 2 July 2012 ‡ National team caps and goals as of 2 July 2012

Marco Ritzberger (born 27 December 1986) is a retired Liechtensteiner football defender who last recently played for FC Vaduz.

At the age of 22, Ritzberger had played 7 games in UEFA Euro 2008 qualifying and once in 2006 FIFA World Cup qualifying.

== Career statistics ==
=== International goals ===
#	Date	Venue	Opponent	Score	Result	Competition
1.	10 August 2011	Rheinpark Stadion, Vaduz, Liechtenstein	Switzerland	1–2	Lost	Friendly
Correct as of 13 January 2013
