= Matar Coly =

Senegalese professional footballer

Personal information
- Date of birth: 10 November 1984 (age 41)
- Place of birth: Tivaouane, Senegal
- Height: 1.87 m (6 ft 2 in)
- Position: Striker

Youth career
- 1994—2002: Génération Foot
- 2002—2003: Lens

Senior career*
| Years | Team | Apps | (Gls) |
| 2003–2005 | Lens B | 38 | (11) |
| 2005–2008 | Neuchâtel Xamax | 104 | (35) |
| 2009 | Al-Wahda | 12 | (6) |
| 2009–2010 | Young Boys | 13 | (1) |
| 2010–2013 | Young Boys II | 5 | (1) |
| 2012–2013 | → Biel-Bienne (loan) | 21 | (9) |
| 2013–2014 | Lausanne-Sport | 20 | (4) |
| 2014–2015 | Biel-Bienne | 0 | (0) |
- * Club domestic league appearances and goals

Matar Coly (born 10 November 1984) is a Senegalese former professional footballer.

== Career ==
Coly began his career in 1994 in Dakar with Génération Foot, at 10 years old. Aged 18 he joined the youth team of RC Lens, in 2003 was called up to the second team of Lens, where he played alongside Seydou Keita, Daniel Cousin and John Utaka. In the summer of 2005 he transferred to Neuchâtel Xamax, where he played until January 2009 before being sold to Al-Wahda in the United Arab Emirates where he would remain for only six months. Coly returned to Switzerland during the summer of 2009, signing for BSC Young Boys. After featuring for the first-team in his first season with the club, he was moved down to the reserve team for the next two seasons and was finally sent on loan to second-tier side FC Biel-Bienne for the 2012–13 season. In the summer of 2013 Coly signed for FC Lausanne-Sport on a one-year contract with an option for a one-year extension, arriving as a free transfer.
