= Daniel Wermelinger =

Swiss football referee

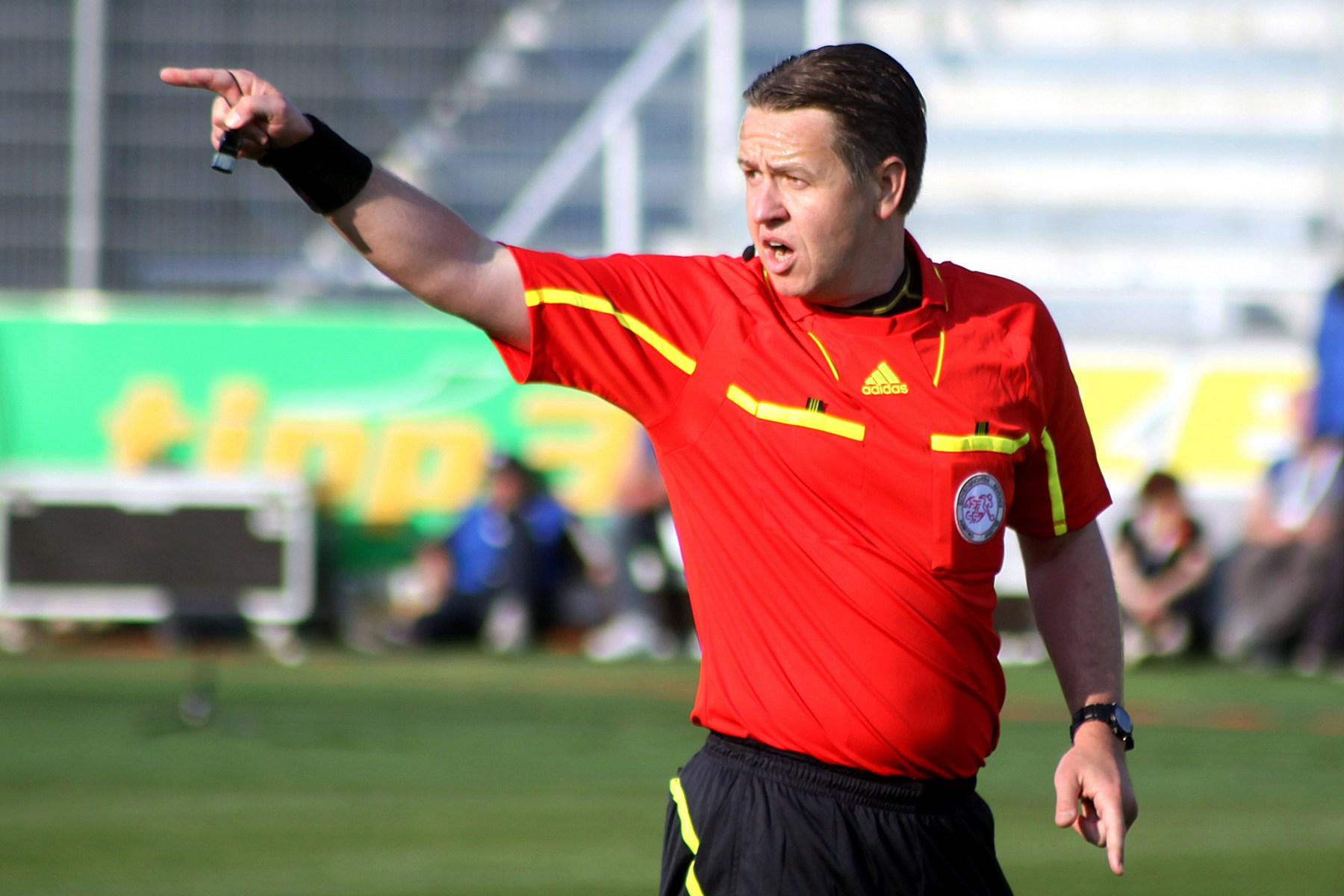
- Daniel Wermelinger Swiss Referee
- Born: 18 March 1971 (age 55); Aarau
- Other occupation: Comptroller/Controller

Domestic
Years	League	Role
1987-2005	2. Liga	Referee
2005-	Swiss Challenge League	Referee
2006-	Swiss Super League	Referee

Daniel Wermelinger (born 18 March 1971) is a Swiss football referee.

Born in Aarau, Wermelinger completed his training to referee in the lower Swiss Leagues in 1987. He has been member of the SSV-ASA (Swiss Referee Association) since 2005. The match FC Basel against FC Schaffhausen on 22 July 2006 was his first game as referee in the Swiss Super League.

He is president of the SR-Union (Swiss Referees Union).
