= 2011–12 FC Luzern season =

FC Luzern
- Chairman: Walter Stierli
- Manager: Murat Yakin
- Stadium: swissporarena
- Swiss Super League: 2nd
- Swiss Cup: Runners-up
- Top goalscorer: League: Nelson Ferreira (7); All: Nelson Ferreira (9)
- Average home league attendance: 14,180
- Biggest win: Neuchâtel Xamax 0–3 Luzern; Losone Sportiva 0–3 Luzern; Luzern 3–0 Grasshopper
- Biggest defeat: Thun 3–1 Luzern; Basel 3–1 Luzern
| Home colours | Away colours |

The 2011–12 season was the 87th season in the history of Fussball-Club Luzern and the club's sixth consecutive season in the top flight of Swiss football.

== Players ==
=== First-team squad ===
Note: Flags indicate national team as defined under FIFA eligibility rules; some limited exceptions apply. Players may hold more than one non-FIFA nationality.

| No. | Pos. | Nation | Player |
|---|---|---|---|
| 1 | GK | SUI | David Zibung |
| 5 | MF | SUI | Michel Renggli |
| 6 | DF | CRO | Tomislav Puljić |
| 7 | DF | SUI | Claudio Lustenberger |
| 8 | FW | ALB | Jahmir Hyka |
| 9 | MF | ISR | Moshe Ohayon |
| 11 | FW | SUI | Daniel Gygax |
| 13 | DF | SUI | Florian Stahel |
| 14 | DF | SUI | Jérôme Thiesson |
| 17 | FW | PAR | Dario Lezcano |
| 19 | FW | SUI | Adrian Winter |
| 20 | MF | SUI | Xavier Hochstrasser |

| No. | Pos. | Nation | Player |
|---|---|---|---|
| 21 | FW | SUI | Nelson Ferreira |
| 22 | MF | KOS | Burim Kukeli |
| 23 | DF | FRA | Sally Sarr |
| 24 | MF | SUI | Alain Wiss |
| 26 | FW | SRB | Dejan Sorgić |
| 27 | DF | CRO | Marijan Urtic |
| 28 | MF | POR | Sava Bento |
| 29 | DF | SUI | Mario Bühler |
| 30 | GK | SUI | Gabriel Wüthrich |
| 32 | MF | SUI | Gezim Shalaj |
| 33 | FW | NGA | Olarenwaju Kayode |

=== Out on loan ===
Note: Flags indicate national team as defined under FIFA eligibility rules; some limited exceptions apply. Players may hold more than one non-FIFA nationality.

| No. | Pos. | Nation | Player |
|---|---|---|---|
| 2 | DF | NGA | Adekunle Lukmon (at Kriens) |
| 3 | DF | SUI | Daniel Fanger (at Aarau) |
| 25 | FW | SUI | Nico Siegrist (at Aarau) |

== Pre-season and friendlies ==
Win Draw Loss

| 28 June 2011 Friendly | Luzern (Switzerland) | 1–0 | (Liechtenstein) Vaduz | Baar, Switzerland |
| 19:00 CEST (UTC+2) | | | | Stadium: Fussballanlage Lättich |

| 20 July 2011 Friendly | Luzern (Switzerland) | 1–5 | (Italy) Lazio | Auronzo di Cadore, Italy |
| 17:00 CEST (UTC+2) | | | | Stadium: Stadio Rodolfo Zandegiacomo |

| 23 July 2011 Friendly | Bahlinger SC (Germany) | 0–4 | (Switzerland) Luzern | Bahlingen, Germany |
| 15:00 CEST (UTC+2) | | | | Stadium: Kaiserstuhlstadion |

| 24 July 2011 Friendly | Luzern (Switzerland) | 1–2 | (Germany) SC Freiburg | Bahlingen, Germany |
| 17:00 CEST (UTC+2) | | | | Stadium: Kaiserstuhlstadion |

| 3 September 2011 Friendly | Luzern (Switzerland) | 2–2 | (Germany) Hamburger SV | Lucerne, Switzerland |
| 20:15 CEST (UTC+2) | | | | Stadium: swissporarena |

== Competitions ==
=== Overall record ===
| Competition | First match | Last match | Starting round | Final position | Record | | | | | | | |
| Competition | First match | Last match | Starting round | Final position | Pld | W | D | L | GF | GA | GD | Win % |
|---|---|---|---|---|---|---|---|---|---|---|---|---|
| Swiss Super League | 17 July 2011 | 23 May 2012 | Matchday 1 | 2nd | 34 | 14 | 12 | 8 | 46 | 32 | +14 | 41.18 |
| Swiss Cup | 18 September 2011 | 16 May 2012 | Round 1 | Runners-up | 6 | 5 | 1 | 0 | 13 | 3 | +10 | 83.33 |
| Total | | | | | 40 | 19 | 13 | 8 | 59 | 35 | +24 | 47.50 |

Source: Competitions

=== Swiss Super League ===
==== League table ====
| Pos | Team | Pld | W | D | L | GF | GA | GD | Pts | Qualification or relegation |
|---|---|---|---|---|---|---|---|---|---|---|
| 1 | Basel (C) | 34 | 22 | 8 | 4 | 78 | 32 | +46 | 74 | Qualification to Champions League second qualifying round |
| 2 | Luzern | 34 | 14 | 12 | 8 | 46 | 32 | +14 | 54 | Qualification to Europa League play-off round (Note: Because 2011–12 Swiss Cup winners Basel qualified for the Champions League, and runners-up Luzern qualified for the Europa League through league position, the distribution of the Europa League spots reverted to league position.) |
| 3 | Young Boys | 34 | 13 | 12 | 9 | 52 | 38 | +14 | 51 | Qualification to Europa League second qualifying round |
| 4 | Servette | 34 | 14 | 6 | 14 | 45 | 53 | −8 | 48 | Qualification to Europa League second qualifying round |
| 5 | Thun | 34 | 11 | 10 | 13 | 38 | 41 | −3 | 43 | |

Source: RSSSF
Rules for classification: 1) points; 2) goal difference; 3) number of goals scored.
(C) Champions

==== Results summary ====
| Overall | | | | | | | | Home | | | | | | Away | | | | | |
| Pld | W | D | L | GF | GA | GD | Pts | W | D | L | GF | GA | GD | W | D | L | GF | GA | GD |
|---|---|---|---|---|---|---|---|---|---|---|---|---|---|---|---|---|---|---|---|
| 34 | 14 | 12 | 8 | 46 | 32 | +14 | 54 | 9 | 5 | 3 | 26 | 14 | +12 | 5 | 7 | 5 | 20 | 18 | +2 |

Source: Swiss Super League

==== Results by round ====
| Round | 1 | 2 | 3 | 4 | 5 | 6 | 7 | 8 | 9 | 10 | 11 | 12 | 13 | 14 | 15 | 16 | 17 | 18 | 19 | 20 | 21 | 22 | 23 | 24 | 25 | 26 | 27 | 28 | 29 | 30 | 31 | 32 | 33 | 34 | 35 | 36 |
|---|---|---|---|---|---|---|---|---|---|---|---|---|---|---|---|---|---|---|---|---|---|---|---|---|---|---|---|---|---|---|---|---|---|---|---|---|
| Ground | A | A | H | H | A | H | A | H | A | H | A | H | H | A | A | H | A | H | H | A | A | H | A | A | H | H | A | H | A | H | A | H | A | H | H | A |
| Result | W | W | D | D | D | W | W | W | W | W | L | L | W | D | L | W | L | L | D | D | D | W | L | L | D | W | C | D | D | W | D | C | D | W | L | W |
| Position | | | | | | | | | | | | | | | | | | | | | | | | | | | | | | | | | | | | |

Source: Swiss Super League
A = Away; H = Home; W = Win; D = Draw; L = Loss

==== Matches ====
| 17 July 2011 1 | Neuchâtel Xamax | 0–3 | Luzern | Neuchâtel |
| 16:00 CEST (UTC+2) | | Report | | Stadium: Stade de la Maladière; Attendance: 4,835; Referee: Nikolaj Hänni |

| 31 July 2011 3 | Luzern | 0–0 | Thun | Lucerne |
| 16:00 CEST (UTC+2) | | Report | | Stadium: swissporarena Attendance: 17,000; Referee: Daniel Wermelinger |

| 3 August 2011 2 | Lausanne-Sport | 0–1 | Luzern | Lausanne |
| 19:45 CEST (UTC+2) | | Report | | Stadium: Stade Olympique de la Pontaise; Attendance: 6,900; Referee: Patrick Graf |

| 7 August 2011 4 | Luzern | 1–1 | Young Boys | Lucerne |
| 16:00 CEST (UTC+2) | | Report | | Stadium: swissporarena Attendance: 17,000; Referee: Stéphan Studer |

| 13 August 2011 5 | Sion | 1–1 | Luzern | Sion |
| 17:45 CEST (UTC+2) | | | | Stadium: Stade Tourbillon |

| 20 August 2011 Round 6 | Luzern | 3–1 | Basel | Swissporarena, Luzern |
| 17:45 | Ferreira 72' (3:1); Hochstrasser 21' (2:0); Ferreira (yellow card) 42'; Ferreira 72' (3:1); Zibung (yellow card) 74'; Wiss (yellow card) 87' | FCB summary | 33' (2:1) Streller; (yellow card) 75' Voser; (yellow card) 83' (yellow-red card) 84' Huggel; (yellow card) 87' A. Frei | Attendance: 17,000; Referee: (Switzerland) Sacha Kever |

| 27 August 2011 7 | Grasshopper | 0–1 | Luzern | Zürich |
| 17:45 CEST (UTC+2) | | | | Stadium: Letzigrund |

| 10 September 2011 8 | Luzern | 3–1 | Zürich | Lucerne |
| 17:45 CEST (UTC+2) | | | | Stadium: swissporarena |

| 22 September 2011 9 | Servette | 0–2 | Luzern | Geneva |
| 19:45 CEST (UTC+2) | | | | Stadium: Stade de Genève |

| 25 September 2011 10 | Luzern | 2–0 | Sion | Lucerne |
| 16:00 CEST (UTC+2) | | | | Stadium: swissporarena |

| 2 October 2011 11 | Young Boys | 1–0 | Luzern | Bern |
| 16:00 CEST (UTC+2) | | | | Stadium: Stade de Suisse |

| 22 October 2011 12 | Luzern | 1–2 | Neuchâtel Xamax | Lucerne |
| 17:45 CEST (UTC+2) | | | | Stadium: swissporarena |

| 27 October 2011 13 | Luzern | 2–0 | Lausanne-Sport | Lucerne |
| 17:45 CEST (UTC+2) | | | | Stadium: swissporarena |

| 30 October 2011 14 | Zürich | 1–1 | Luzern | Zürich |
| 16:00 CET (UTC+1) | | | | Stadium: Letzigrund |

| 5 November 2011 15 | Thun | 3–1 | Luzern | Thun |
| 17:45 CET (UTC+1) | | | | Stadium: Arena Thun |

| 20 November 2011 16 | Luzern | 2–1 | Grasshopper | Lucerne |
| 16:00 CET (UTC+1) | | | | Stadium: swissporarena |

| 3 December 2011 Round 17 | Basel | 1–0 | Luzern | St. Jakob-Park, Basel |
| 17:45 | Cabral (yellow card) 32'; A. Frei (yellow card) 64'; Streller 70' (1:0); Abraham (yellow card) 82'; Dragović (yellow card) 87' | FCB summary | (yellow card) 32' Gygax; (yellow card) 61' H. Yakin; (yellow card) 68' Stahel; (yellow card) 84' Sarr | Attendance: 31,081; Referee: (Switzerland) Alain Bieri |

| 11 December 2011 18 | Luzern | 1–2 | Servette | Lucerne |
| 16:00 CET (UTC+1) | | | | Stadium: swissporarena |

| 4 February 2012 19 | Luzern | 1–1 | Zürich | Lucerne |
| 17:45 CET (UTC+1) | | | | Stadium: swissporarena |

| 11 February 2012 20 | Thun | 1–1 | Luzern | Thun |
| 17:45 CET (UTC+1) | | | | Stadium: Arena Thun |

| 19 February 2012 21 | Lausanne-Sport | 0–0 | Luzern | Lausanne |
| 16:00 CET (UTC+1) | | | | Stadium: Stade Olympique de la Pontaise |

| 25 February 2012 22 | Luzern | 2–0 | Young Boys | Lucerne |
| 17:45 CET (UTC+1) | | | | Stadium: swissporarena |

| 4 March 2012 Round 23 | Basel | 3–1 | Luzern | St. Jakob-Park, Basel |
| 16:00 | Abraham 28' (1:0); Kováč (yellow card) 42'; Steinhöfer (yellow card) 45'; Stocker (yellow card) 59'; A. Frei (yellow card) 63'; A. Frei 78' (2:1); A. Frei 81' (3:1) | FCB summary | (yellow card) 15' Renggli; (yellow card) 27' Puljić; 68' (1:1) Ohayon; (red card) 90+2' Lustenberger | Attendance: 30,261; Referee: (Switzerland) Patrick Graf |

| 11 March 2012 24 | Servette | 2–1 | Luzern | Geneva |
| 16:00 CET (UTC+1) | | | | Stadium: Stade de Genève |

| 17 March 2012 25 | Luzern | 0–0 | Sion | Lucerne |
| 17:45 CET (UTC+1) | | | | Stadium: swissporarena |

| 25 March 2012 26 | Luzern | 1–0 | Grasshopper | Lucerne |
| 16:00 CET (UTC+1) | | | | Stadium: swissporarena |

| 1 April 2012 27 | Neuchâtel Xamax | Cancelled | Luzern | Neuchâtel |
| 16:00 CEST (UTC+2) | | | | Stadium: Stade de la Maladière |

| 7 April 2012 Round 28 | Luzern | 1–1 | Basel | Swissporarena, Luzern |
| 17:45 | Lezcano 59' (1:1); Lezcano (yellow card) 63' | FCB summary | 3' (0:1) Shaqiri | Attendance: 17,000; Referee: (Switzerland) Sascha Kever |

| 15 April 2012 29 | Zürich | 0–0 | Luzern | Zürich |
| 16:00 CEST (UTC+2) | | | | Stadium: Letzigrund |

| 21 April 2012 30 | Luzern | 3–1 | Servette | Lucerne |
| 17:45 CEST (UTC+2) | | | | Stadium: swissporarena |

| 28 April 2012 31 | Grasshopper | 2–2 | Luzern | Zürich |
| 17:45 CEST (UTC+2) | | | | Stadium: Letzigrund |

| 1 May 2012 32 | Luzern | Cancelled | Neuchâtel Xamax | Lucerne |
| 19:45 CEST (UTC+2) | | | | Stadium: swissporarena |

| 5 May 2012 33 | Young Boys | 2–2 | Luzern | Bern |
| 19:45 CEST (UTC+2) | | | | Stadium: Stade de Suisse |

| 12 May 2012 34 | Luzern | 3–2 | Lausanne-Sport | Lucerne |
| 17:45 CEST (UTC+2) | | | | Stadium: swissporarena |

| 20 May 2012 35 | Luzern | 0–1 | Thun | Lucerne |
| 16:00 CEST (UTC+2) | | | | Stadium: swissporarena |

| 23 May 2012 36 | Sion | 1–3 | Luzern | Sion |
| 20:15 CEST (UTC+2) | | | | Stadium: Stade Tourbillon |

=== Swiss Cup ===
| 18 September 2011 Round 1 | Losone Sportiva | 0–3 | Luzern | Losone |
| 15:00 CEST (UTC+2) | | | | Stadium: Campo Saleggi; Attendance: 1,600; Referee: Sascha Kever |

| 16 October 2011 Round 2 | FC Grand-Lancy | 1–3 | Luzern | Grand-Lancy |
| 14:30 CEST (UTC+2) | | Report | | Stadium: Stade de Marignac |

| 27 November 2011 Round 3 | FC Wohlen | 1–2 | Luzern | Wohlen |
| 14:30 CET (UTC+1) | | | | Stadium: Stadion Niedermatten; Attendance: 4,100; Referee: Jérôme Laperrière |

| 20 March 2012 Quarter-finals | Luzern | 3–0 | Grasshopper | Lucerne |
| 20:00 CET (UTC+1) | Lezcano 42'; Ferreira 61'; Lustenberger 80' | | | Stadium: swissporarena Attendance: 7,034; Referee: Sascha Kever |

| 11 April 2012 Semi-finals | Sion | 0–1 | Luzern | Sion |
| 20:15 CEST (UTC+2) | Adaílton (yellow card) 9'; Sauthier (yellow card) 19'; Bühler (yellow card) 57' | | Winter 7'; Ohayon (yellow card) 12' | Stadium: Stade Tourbillon; Attendance: 12,000; Referee: Stephan Studer |

Final

16 May 2012
20:30 CEST
Final

| Basel | 1–1 (a.e.t.) | Luzern |
|---|---|---|
| Dragović (yellow card) 40'; Huggel 56' (1:0); G. Xhaka (yellow card) 90' | SFV summary FCB summary | (yellow card) 57' Wiss; 67' (1:1) Puljić; (yellow card) 90' Gygax |
Penalties
| Yapi Yapo (penalty scored); Streller (penalty scored); Zoua (penalty scored); Shaqiri (penalty scored) | 4–2 | (penalty scored) Renggli; (penalty missed) Ohayon; (penalty scored) Gygax; (penalty missed) Stahel |

Stade de Suisse, Bern
Attendance: 30,100
Referee: (Switzerland) Daniel Wermelinger

| GK | (Switzerland) Yann Sommer |
| DF | (Germany) Markus Steinhöfer |
| DF | (Argentina) David Abraham |
| DF | (Austria) Aleksandar Dragović | (yellow card) 40' | (substituted off) 72' |
| DF | (South Korea) Park Joo-Ho |
| MF | (Switzerland) Xherdan Shaqiri |
| MF | (Switzerland) Benjamin Huggel (cap) | | (substituted off) 96' |
| MF | (Switzerland) Granit Xhaka | (yellow card) 90' |
| MF | (Switzerland) Valentin Stocker | | (substituted off) 73' |
| ST | (Switzerland) Alexander Frei |
| ST | (Switzerland) Marco Streller |
Substitutes:
| DF | (Czech Republic) Radoslav Kováč | | (substituted in) 72' |
| FW | (Cameroon) Jacques Zoua | | (substituted in) 73' |
| FW | (Ivory Coast) Gilles Yapi | | (substituted in) 96' |
Manager:
(Germany) Heiko Vogel

| GK | (Switzerland) David Zibung |
| DF | (France) Sally Sarr |
| DF | (Switzerland) Florian Stahel |
| DF | (Croatia) Tomislav Puljić |
| DF | (Switzerland) Claudio Lustenberger |
| MF | (Switzerland) Alain Wiss | (yellow card) 57' |
| MF | (Switzerland) Michel Renggli |
| MF | (Switzerland) Adrian Winter |
| MF | (Switzerland) Xavier Hochstrasser | | (substituted off) 60' |
| FW | (Switzerland) Nelson Ferreira | | (substituted off) 104' |
| ST | (Paraguay) Dario Lezcano | | (substituted off) 95' |
Substitutes:
| MF | (Switzerland) Daniel Gygax | (yellow card) 90' | (substituted in) 60' |
| ST | (Albania) Jahmir Hyka | | (substituted in) 95' |
| FW | (Israel) Moshe Ohayon | | (substituted in) 104' |
Manager:
(Switzerland) Murat Yakin
