= 2012–13 FC Luzern season =

FC Luzern
- Chairman: Mike Hauser
- Manager: Ryszard Komornicki (until 2 April); Gerardo Seoane (caretaker, 4 April to 8 April); Carlos Bernegger (from 8 April)
- Stadium: swissporarena
- Swiss Super League: 8th
- Swiss Cup: Round 1
- UEFA Europa League: Play-off round
- Top goalscorer: League: Daniel Gygax (7); All: Daniel Gygax (8)
- Average home league attendance: 12,410
Home colours	Away colours

The 2012–13 season was the 88th season in the history of Fussball-Club Luzern and the club's seventh consecutive season in the top flight of Swiss football.

== Players ==
=== First-team squad ===
Note: Flags indicate national team as defined under FIFA eligibility rules; some limited exceptions apply. Players may hold more than one non-FIFA nationality.

No.	Pos.	Nation	Player
1	GK	SUI	David Zibung
5	MF	SUI	Michel Renggli
6	DF	CRO	Tomislav Puljić
7	DF	SUI	Claudio Lustenberger
8	MF	ALB	Jahmir Hyka
9	FW	BUL	Dimitar Rangelov
10	MF	ALB	Pajtim Kasami (on loan from Fulham)
11	MF	SUI	Daniel Gygax
13	DF	SUI	Florian Stahel (captain)
14	DF	SUI	Jérôme Thiesson
15	MF	SUI	Philipp Muntwiler
17	FW	PAR	Dario Lezcano
19	FW	SUI	Adrian Winter

No.	Pos.	Nation	Player
20	MF	SUI	Xavier Hochstrasser
22	FW	CMR	Mouangue Otele (on loan from Wil)
23	DF	FRA	Sally Sarr
24	MF	SUI	Alain Wiss
25	FW	SUI	Nico Siegrist
26	FW	SRB	Dejan Sorgić
27	MF	SUI	Stephan Andrist (on loan from Basel)
28	MF	POR	Sava Bento
29	DF	SUI	Mario Bühler
30	GK	SUI	Gabriel Wüthrich
33	GK	LIE	Peter Jehle (on loan from Vaduz)
34	DF	NGA	Luqmon
35	DF	CRO	Marijan Urtic

== Pre-season and friendlies ==
Win Draw Loss

29 June 2012 Friendly	Luzern (Switzerland)	5–1	(Switzerland) Winterthur	Meggen, Switzerland
19:00 CEST (UTC+2)		Report		Stadium: Sportplatz Hofmatt

23 January 2013 Friendly	Luzern (Switzerland)	0–1	(Romania) CFR Cluj	Marbella, Spain
15:00 CET (UTC+1)		Report		Stadium: Estadio Municipal Antonio Lorenzo Cuevas

== Competitions ==
=== Overall record ===
Competition	First match	Last match	Starting round	Final position	Record							
Competition	First match	Last match	Starting round	Final position	Pld	W	D	L	GF	GA	GD	Win %
Swiss Super League	15 July 2012	1 June 2013	Matchday 1	8th	36	10	12	14	41	52	−11	27.78
Swiss Cup	16 September 2012		Round 1	Round 3	1	0	1	0	1	1	+0	0.00
UEFA Europa League	23 August 2012	30 August 2012	Play-off round	Play-off round	2	1	0	1	2	3	−1	50.00
Total					39	11	13	15	44	56	−12	28.21

Source: Competitions

=== Swiss Super League ===
==== League table ====
Pos	Team	Pld	W	D	L	GF	GA	GD	Pts	Qualification or relegation
6	Sion	36	13	9	14	40	54	−14	48	
7	Young Boys	36	11	10	15	48	50	−2	43	
8	Luzern	36	10	12	14	41	52	−11	42	
9	Lausanne-Sport	36	8	9	19	32	51	−19	33	
10	Servette (R)	36	6	8	22	32	62	−30	26	Relegation to Swiss Challenge League

Source: Swiss Super League (in German)
Rules for classification: 1) points; 2) goal difference; 3) number of goals scored.
(R) Relegated

==== Results summary ====
Overall								Home						Away					
Pld	W	D	L	GF	GA	GD	Pts	W	D	L	GF	GA	GD	W	D	L	GF	GA	GD
36	10	12	14	41	52	−11	42	6	8	4	18	19	−1	4	4	10	23	33	−10

Source: Swiss Super League

==== Results by round ====
Round	1	2	3	4	5	6	7	8	9	10	11	12	13	14	15	16	17	18	19	20	21	22	23	24	25	26	27	28	29	30	31	32	33	34	35	36
Ground	H	A	H	A	H	H	A	H	A	A	H	A	H	A	H	A	A	H	A	H	A	H	H	A	H	A	H	H	A	A	H	H	A	A	H	A
Result	D	D	L	L	D	L	W	L	L	L	W	L	W	L	D	W	D	D	L	D	L	D	D	D	L	L	W	D	W	D	W	W	L	L	W	W
Position																																				

Source: Swiss Super League
A = Away; H = Home; W = Win; D = Draw; L = Loss

==== Matches ====
15 July 2012 1	Luzern	1–1	Zürich	Lucerne
13:45 CEST (UTC+2)	Winter 90+4'	Report	Gavranović 24' (pen.)	Stadium: swissporarena Attendance: 14,127; Referee: Sascha Amhof

21 July 2012 Round 2	Basel	2–2	Luzern	St. Jakob-Park, Basel
19:45	Kovac (yellow card) 24'; Steinhöfer (yellow card) 30'; A. Frei 61' (1:1); Streller 81' (2:2)	FCB summary	18' (0:1) Lezcano; (yellow card) 21' Muntwiler; (yellow card) 44' Kryeziu; (yellow card) 66' Lezcano; 66' (1:2) Lezcano; (yellow card) 76' Puljić	Attendance: 29,256; Referee: (Switzerland) Alain Bieri

29 July 2012 3	Luzern	0–3	Sion	Lucerne
16:00 CEST (UTC+2)		Report		Stadium: swissporarena Attendance: 13,298; Referee: Cyril Zimmermann

5 August 2012 4	Thun	2–1	Luzern	Thun
13:45 CEST (UTC+2)				Stadium: Arena Thun

11 August 2012 5	Luzern	1–1	St. Gallen	Lucerne
19:45 CEST (UTC+2)				Stadium: swissporarena

19 August 2012 6	Luzern	0–2	Grasshopper	Lucerne
16:00 CEST (UTC+2)				Stadium: swissporarena

26 August 2012 7	Servette	0–2	Luzern	Geneva
13:45 CEST (UTC+2)				Stadium: Stade de Genève

2 September 2012 8	Luzern	1–2	Young Boys	Lucerne
16:00 CEST (UTC+2)				Stadium: swissporarena

23 September 2012 9	Lausanne-Sport	1–0	Luzern	Lausanne
13:45 CEST (UTC+2)				Stadium: Stade Olympique de la Pontaise

27 September 2012 10	Grasshopper	2–0	Luzern	Zürich
19:45 CEST (UTC+2)				Stadium: Letzigrund

30 September 2012 11	Luzern	2–1	Thun	Lucerne
13:45 CEST (UTC+2)				Stadium: swissporarena

7 October 2012 12	Sion	3–2	Luzern	Sion
17:45 CEST (UTC+2)				Stadium: Stade Tourbillon

20 October 2012 Round 13	Luzern	1–0	Basel	Swissporarena, Luzern
16:00	Puljić (yellow card) 44' (Jahmir Hyka) Ajeti 60' (o.g. 1:0); Muntwiler (yellow card) 75'; (yellow card) 90+3' Winter	FCB summary	(yellow card) 40' Cabral; (yellow card) 42' D. Degen; (yellow card) 49' Dragović	Attendance: 16,253; Referee: (Austria) Gerhard Grobelnik

4 November 2012 15	Luzern	1–1	Servette	Lucerne
13:45 CET (UTC+1)				Stadium: swissporarena

17 November 2012 16	Zürich	0–2	Luzern	Zürich
19:45 CET (UTC+1)				Stadium: Letzigrund

25 November 2012 17	St. Gallen	1–1	Luzern	St. Gallen
13:45 CET (UTC+1)				Stadium: Kybunpark

28 November 2012 14	Young Boys	2–1	Luzern	Bern
20:15 CET (UTC+1)				Stadium: Stade de Suisse

1 December 2012 18	Luzern	0–0	Lausanne-Sport	Lucerne
19:45 CET (UTC+1)				Stadium: swissporarena

9 February 2013 19	Young Boys	3–2	Luzern	Bern
19:45 CET (UTC+1)				Stadium: Stade de Suisse

17 February 2013 20	Luzern	1–1	Zürich	Lucerne
13:45 CET (UTC+1)				Stadium: swissporarena

24 February 2013 21	St. Gallen	4–0	Luzern	St. Gallen
13:45 CET (UTC+1)				Stadium: Kybunpark

2 March 2013 22	Luzern	0–0	Thun	Lucerne
19:45 CET (UTC+1)				Stadium: swissporarena

9 March 2013 23	Luzern	1–1	Servette	Lucerne
19:45 CET (UTC+1)				Stadium: swissporarena

17 March 2013 24	Grasshopper	0–0	Luzern	Zürich
16:00 CET (UTC+1)				Stadium: Letzigrund

1 April 2013 Round 25	Luzern	0–4	Basel	Swissporarena, Luzern
13:45	Muntwiler (yellow card) 29'; Puljić (yellow card) 41'; Hyka (yellow card) 55'; Lustenberger (yellow card) 65'	FCB Summary	34' (0:1) Serey Die; 64' (0:2) Díaz; 71' (0:3) Salah; 83' (0:4) P. Degen; (yellow card) 90+3' Bobadilla	Attendance: 17,000 (sold out); Referee: (Switzerland) Stephan Studer

6 April 2013 26	Sion	2–1	Luzern	Sion
19:45 CEST (UTC+2)				Stadium: Stade Tourbillon

13 April 2013 27	Luzern	1–0	Lausanne-Sport	Lucerne
19:45 CEST (UTC+2)				Stadium: swissporarena

21 April 2013 28	Luzern	1–1	Grasshopper	Lucerne
13:45 CEST (UTC+2)				Stadium: swissporarena

27 April 2013 Round 29	Basel	0–3	Luzern	St. Jakob-Park, Basel
13:45	Sauro (yellow card) 64'; Zoua (yellow card) 79'	FCB Summary	14' (0:1) Gygax; 44' (0:2) Hochstrasser; 70' (0:3) Winter; (yellow card) 76' Puljić	Attendance: 28,440; Referee: (Switzerland) Alain Bieri (Solothurn)

5 May 2013 30	Thun	1–1	Luzern	Thun
16:00 CEST (UTC+2)				Stadium: Arena Thun

8 May 2013 31	Luzern	2–0	St. Gallen	Lucerne
19:45 CEST (UTC+2)				Stadium: swissporarena

11 May 2013 32	Luzern	3–1	Young Boys	Lucerne
19:45 CEST (UTC+2)				Stadium: swissporarena

18 May 2013 33	Zürich	4–1	Luzern	Zürich
19:45 CET (UTC+1)				Stadium: Letzigrund

25 May 2013 34	Lausanne-Sport	3–0	Luzern	Lausanne
17:45 CEST (UTC+2)				Stadium: Stade Olympique de la Pontaise

29 May 2013 35	Luzern	2–0	Sion	Lucerne
20:30 CEST (UTC+2)				Stadium: swissporarena

1 June 2013 36	Servette	3–4	Luzern	Geneva
20:30 CEST (UTC+2)				Stadium: Stade de Genève

=== Swiss Cup ===
16 September 2012 Round 1	SR Delémont	1–1 (a.e.t.) (6–5 p)	Luzern	Delémont
14:00 CEST (UTC+2)	Sène 11'		Gygax 15'	Stadium: La Blancherie; Attendance: 2,135; Referee: Sandro Schärer

=== UEFA Europa League ===
==== Play-off round ====
23 August 2012 First leg	Luzern (Switzerland)	2–1	(Belgium) Genk	Zürich, Switzerland
19:30 CEST (UTC+2)	Rangelov 7'; Winter 71'	Report	Vossen 12'	Stadium: swissporarena Attendance: 8,127; Referee: Antonio Damato (Italy)

30 August 2012 Second leg	Genk (Belgium)	2–0 (3–2 agg.)	(Switzerland) Luzern	Genk, Belgium
20:00 CEST (UTC+2)	Fernández 56'; Masika 88'	Report		Stadium: Cristal Arena; Attendance: 12,135; Referee: Mike Dean (England)
