= 2013–14 FC Luzern season =

FC Luzern
- Chairman: Rudolf Stäger
- Manager: Carlos Bernegger
- Stadium: swissporarena
- Swiss Super League: 4th
- Swiss Cup: Semi-finals
- Top goalscorer: League: Dimitar Rangelov (11); All: Dimitar Rangelov (11)
- Average home league attendance: 11,291
- Biggest win: FC Murten 0–11 Luzern
- Biggest defeat: St. Gallen 4–1 Luzern; Sion 3–0 Luzern; Grasshopper 4–1 Luzern
| Home colours | Away colours |

The 2013–14 season was the 89th season in the history of Fussball-Club Luzern and the club's eighth consecutive season in the top flight of Swiss football.

== Players ==
=== First-team squad ===
Note: Flags indicate national team as defined under FIFA eligibility rules; some limited exceptions apply. Players may hold more than one non-FIFA nationality.

| No. | Pos. | Nation | Player |
|---|---|---|---|
| 1 | GK | SUI | David Zibung |
| 3 | DF | ALB | Ferid Matri |
| 4 | MF | AUS | Oliver Bozanić |
| 5 | MF | SUI | Michel Renggli (captain) |
| 6 | DF | CRO | Tomislav Puljić |
| 7 | DF | SUI | Claudio Lustenberger |
| 8 | MF | ALB | Jahmir Hyka |
| 9 | FW | BUL | Dimitar Rangelov |
| 13 | DF | SUI | Florian Stahel |
| 14 | DF | SUI | Jérôme Thiesson |
| 16 | DF | SUI | François Affolter |
| 18 | GK | ITA | Lorenzo Bucchi |
| 19 | MF | SUI | Adrian Winter |

| No. | Pos. | Nation | Player |
|---|---|---|---|
| 20 | MF | SUI | Xavier Hochstrasser |
| 21 | FW | PAR | Dario Lezcano |
| 23 | DF | FRA | Sally Sarr |
| 24 | MF | SUI | Alain Wiss |
| 25 | FW | GER | Kevin Holz |
| 26 | MF | SUI | Remo Freuler |
| 28 | MF | POR | Sava Bento |
| 29 | DF | TUN | Yassin Mikari |
| 30 | GK | SUI | Gabriel Wüthrich |
| 31 | MF | ALB | Hekuran Kryeziu |
| 33 | DF | ALB | Fidan Aliti |
| 35 | MF | ALB | Haxhi Neziraj |

== Pre-season and friendlies ==
Win Draw Loss

| 16 July 2013 Friendly | Luzern (Switzerland) | 1–4 | (Germany) Borussia Dortmund | Lucerne, Switzerland |
| 19:30 CEST (UTC+2) | | Report | | Stadium: swissporarena |

| 11 January 2014 Friendly | Luzern (Switzerland) | 3–0 | (Switzerland) Locarno |
| 14:30 CET (UTC+1) | | Report |

| 16 January 2014 Friendly | Luzern (Switzerland) | 1–2 | (Germany) 1. FC Nürnberg | La Cala de Mijas, Spain |
| 16:00 CET (UTC+1) | | Report | | Stadium: Campo Hotel La Cala |

| 18 January 2014 Friendly | Luzern (Switzerland) | 1–0 | (Romania) Steaua București |
| 18:00 CET (UTC+1) | | Report |

== Competitions ==
=== Overall record ===
| Competition | First match | Last match | Starting round | Final position | Record | | | | | | | |
| Competition | First match | Last match | Starting round | Final position | Pld | W | D | L | GF | GA | GD | Win % |
|---|---|---|---|---|---|---|---|---|---|---|---|---|
| Swiss Super League | 14 July 2013 | 18 May 2014 | Matchday 1 | 4th | 36 | 15 | 6 | 15 | 48 | 54 | −6 | 41.67 |
| Swiss Cup | 18 August 2013 | 26 March 2014 | Round 1 | Semi-finals | 5 | 4 | 0 | 1 | 18 | 2 | +16 | 80.00 |
| Total | | | | | 41 | 19 | 6 | 16 | 66 | 56 | +10 | 46.34 |

Source: Competitions

=== Swiss Super League ===
==== League table ====
| Pos | Team | Pld | W | D | L | GF | GA | GD | Pts | Qualification or relegation |
|---|---|---|---|---|---|---|---|---|---|---|
| 2 | Grasshopper | 36 | 19 | 8 | 9 | 67 | 43 | +24 | 65 | Qualification for the Champions League third qualifying round |
| 3 | Young Boys | 36 | 17 | 8 | 11 | 59 | 50 | +9 | 59 | Qualification for the Europa League third qualifying round |
| 4 | Luzern | 36 | 15 | 6 | 15 | 48 | 54 | −6 | 51 | Qualification for the Europa League second qualifying round |
| 5 | Zürich | 36 | 14 | 8 | 14 | 51 | 52 | −1 | 50 | Qualification for the Europa League play-off round (Note: Zürich won the 2013–14 Swiss Cup, so therefore qualified for the Play-off round of the 2014–15 UEFA Europa League.) |
| 6 | Thun | 36 | 13 | 9 | 14 | 57 | 53 | +4 | 48 | |

Source: Swiss Super League (in German)
Rules for classification: 1) points; 2) goal difference; 3) number of goals scored.

==== Results summary ====
| Overall | | | | | | | | Home | | | | | | Away | | | | | |
| Pld | W | D | L | GF | GA | GD | Pts | W | D | L | GF | GA | GD | W | D | L | GF | GA | GD |
|---|---|---|---|---|---|---|---|---|---|---|---|---|---|---|---|---|---|---|---|
| 0 | 0 | 0 | 0 | 0 | 0 | 0 | 0 | 0 | 0 | 0 | 0 | 0 | 0 | 0 | 0 | 0 | 0 | 0 | 0 |

Source: Swiss Super League

==== Results by round ====
| Round | 1 | 2 | 3 | 4 | 5 | 6 | 7 | 8 | 9 | 10 | 11 | 12 | 13 | 14 | 15 | 16 | 17 | 18 | 19 | 20 | 21 | 22 | 23 | 24 | 25 | 26 | 27 | 28 | 29 | 30 | 31 | 32 | 33 | 34 | 35 | 36 |
|---|---|---|---|---|---|---|---|---|---|---|---|---|---|---|---|---|---|---|---|---|---|---|---|---|---|---|---|---|---|---|---|---|---|---|---|---|
| Ground | H | A | H | H | A | H | A | A | H | H | A | H | A | A | H | A | H | A | H | A | H | H | A | A | H | A | H | A | H | A | A | H | A | H | A | H |
| Result | W | L | W | W | D | D | L | W | L | D | W | D | W | L | W | W | W | D | L | L | W | L | D | L | W | L | L | L | W | W | W | L | L | L | L | W |
| Position | 2 | 7 | 4 | 2 | 2 | 3 | 5 | 4 | 4 | 5 | | | | | | | | | | | | | | | | | | | | | | | | | | |

Source: Swiss Super League
A = Away; H = Home; W = Win; D = Draw; L = Loss

==== Matches ====
| 14 July 2013 1 | Luzern | 2–0 | Lausanne-Sport | Lucerne |
| 13:45 CEST (UTC+2) | | | | Stadium: swissporarena |

| 20 July 2013 2 | Aarau | 4–2 | Luzern | Aarau |
| 19:45 CEST (UTC+2) | | | | Stadium: Stadion Brügglifeld |

| 28 July 2013 3 | Luzern | 3–2 | Zürich | Lucerne |
| 13:45 CEST (UTC+2) | | | | Stadium: swissporarena |

| 4 August 2013 4 | Luzern | 1–0 | Sion | Lucerne |
| 16:00 CEST (UTC+2) | | | | Stadium: swissporarena |

| 11 August 2013 5 | Thun | 1–1 | Luzern | Thun |
| 13:45 CEST (UTC+2) | | | | Stadium: Stockhorn Arena |

| 24 August 2013 Round 6 | Luzern | 1–1 | Basel | Swissporarena, Luzern |
| 19:45 | Lezcano (yellow card) 43'; Sarr (yellow card) 51'; Rangelov 90+3' (1:1) | FCB summary | (yellow card) 17' Safari; 32' (0:1) Sio; (yellow card) 34' Xhaka; (yellow card) 85' Ivanov | Attendance: 15,211; Referee: (Switzerland) Nikolaj Hänni |

| 1 September 2013 7 | St. Gallen | 4–1 | Luzern | St. Gallen |
| 13:45 CEST (UTC+2) | | | | Stadium: Kybunpark |

| 21 September 2013 8 | Young Boys | 0–1 | Luzern | Bern |
| 19:45 CEST (UTC+2) | | | | Stadium: Stade de Suisse |

| 25 September 2013 9 | Luzern | 0–2 | Grasshopper | Lucerne |
| 19:45 CEST (UTC+2) | | | | Stadium: swissporarena |

| 29 September 2013 10 | Luzern | 1–1 | Thun | Lucerne |
| 13:45 CEST (UTC+2) | | | | Stadium: swissporarena |

| 5 October 2013 11 | Zürich | 0–2 | Luzern | Zürich |
| 19:45 CEST (UTC+2) | | | | Stadium: Letzigrund |

| 20 October 2013 12 | Luzern | 1–1 | Young Boys | Lucerne |
| 16:00 CEST (UTC+2) | | | | Stadium: swissporarena |

| 26 October 2013 13 | Lausanne-Sport | 0–1 | Luzern | Lausanne |
| 13:45 CEST (UTC+2) | | | | Stadium: Stade Olympique de la Pontaise |

| 2 November 2013 14 | Sion | 3–0 | Luzern | Sion |
| 19:45 CET (UTC+1) | | | | Stadium: Stade Tourbillon |

| 24 November 2013 15 | Luzern | 3–1 | St. Gallen | Lucerne |
| 16:00 CET (UTC+1) | | | | Stadium: swissporarena |

| 30 November 2013 16 | Grasshopper | 1–2 | Luzern | Zürich |
| 19:45 CET (UTC+1) | | | | Stadium: Letzigrund |

| 8 December 2013 17 | Luzern | 1–0 | Aarau | Lucerne |
| 13:45 CET (UTC+1) | | | | Stadium: swissporarena |

| 14 December 2013 Round 18 | Basel | 1–1 | Luzern | St. Jakob-Park, Basel |
| 19:45 | D. Degen (yellow card) 10'; Ajeti (yellow card) 45'; Schär (yellow card) 36' (yellow-red card) 66' (goal) 62' (1:1) | FCB summary | 27' (0:1) Wiss; (yellow card) 61' Rangelov; (yellow card) 56' (yellow-red card) 88' Stahel | Attendance: 27,649; Referee: (Switzerland) Nikolaj Hänni |

| 2 February 2014 19 | Luzern | 1–3 | Grasshopper | Lucerne |
| 13:45 CET (UTC+1) | | | | Stadium: swissporarena |

| 8 February 2014 20 | Thun | 2–1 | Luzern | Thun |
| 19:45 CET (UTC+1) | | | | Stadium: Stockhorn Arena |

| 15 February 2014 21 | Luzern | 3–2 | Aarau | Lucerne |
| 13:45 CET (UTC+1) | | | | Stadium: swissporarena |

| 23 February 2014 22 | Luzern | 1–2 | Young Boys | Lucerne |
| 13:45 CET (UTC+1) | | | | Stadium: swissporarena |

| 2 March 2014 23 | St. Gallen | 1–1 | Luzern | St. Gallen |
| 16:00 CET (UTC+1) | | | | Stadium: Kybunpark |

| 9 March 2014 24 | Sion | 3–2 | Luzern | Sion |
| 16:00 CET (UTC+1) | | | | Stadium: Stade Tourbillon |

| 16 March 2014 25 | Luzern | 1–0 | Zürich | Lucerne |
| 13:45 CET (UTC+1) | | | | Stadium: swissporarena |

| 23 March 2014 26 | Lausanne-Sport | 1–0 | Luzern | Lausanne |
| 13:45 CET (UTC+1) | | | | Stadium: Stade Olympique de la Pontaise |

| 30 March 2014 Round 27 | Luzern | 0–2 | Basel | Swissporarena, Luzern |
| 16:00 | Winter (yellow card) 44'; Lustenberger (yellow card) 88' | FCB Summary; Summary | (yellow card) 29' Sio; 51' (0:1) Sio; (yellow card) 85' Aliji; (yellow card) 90' Xhaka; 90+2' (0:2) Sio | Attendance: 15,170; Referee: (Switzerland) Stephan Studer |

| 6 April 2014 28 | Young Boys | 2–1 | Luzern | Bern |
| 16:00 CEST (UTC+2) | | | | Stadium: Stade de Suisse |

| 13 April 2014 29 | Luzern | 1–0 | St. Gallen | Lucerne |
| 13:45 CEST (UTC+2) | | | | Stadium: swissporarena |

| 16 April 2014 30 | Aarau | 1–2 | Luzern | Aarau |
| 19:45 CEST (UTC+2) | | | | Stadium: Stadion Brügglifeld |

| 26 April 2014 31 | Zürich | 1–2 | Luzern | Zürich |
| 19:45 CEST (UTC+2) | | | | Stadium: Letzigrund |

| 3 May 2014 32 | Luzern | 0–1 | Sion | Lucerne |
| 19:45 CEST (UTC+2) | | | | Stadium: swissporarena |

| 7 May 2014 Round 33 | Basel | 3–1 | Luzern | St. Jakob-Park, Basel |
| 20:30 | Stocker 10' (1:0); Schär 18' (2:0); Suchý (yellow card) 33'; Sio 70' (3:1) | FCB Summary; Summary | 38' (2:1) Rangelov; (yellow card) 52' Freuler | Attendance: 25,677; Referee: (Switzerland) Nikolaj Hänni |

| 11 May 2014 34 | Luzern | 3–4 | Lausanne-Sport | Lucerne |
| 13:45 CEST (UTC+2) | | | | Stadium: swissporarena |

| 15 May 2014 35 | Grasshopper | 4–1 | Luzern | Zürich |
| 20:30 CEST (UTC+2) | | | | Stadium: Letzigrund |

| 18 May 2014 36 | Luzern | 3–0 | Thun | Lucerne |
| 16:00 CEST (UTC+2) | | | | Stadium: swissporarena |

=== Swiss Cup ===
| 18 August 2013 Round 1 | FC Murten | 0–11 | Luzern | Murten |
| 15:00 CEST (UTC+2) | | Report | | Stadium: Sportanlage Prehl; Attendance: 2,700; Referee: Sascha Amhof |

| 15 September 2013 Round 2 | US Terre Sainte | 1–4 | Luzern | Nyon |
| 15:00 CEST (UTC+2) | | Report | | Stadium: Centre sportif de Colovray; Attendance: 1,900; Referee: Fedayi San |

| 10 November 2013 Round 3 | Luzern | 1–0 | Sion | Lucerne |
| 15:30 CET (UTC+1) | Rangelov 88' | Report | | Stadium: swissporarena Attendance: 7,737; Referee: Alain Bieri |

| 4 December 2013 Quarter-finals | Luzern | 2–0 | Lausanne-Sport | Lucerne |
| 19:45 CET (UTC+1) | Rangelov 61'; Lezcano 71' | Report | | Stadium: swissporarena Attendance: 6,110; Referee: Sascha Amhof |

| 26 March 2014 Semi-finals | Basel | 1–0 | Luzern | Basel |
| 19:00 CET (UTC+1) | Callà 80' | Report | | Stadium: St. Jakob-Park |
