= 2011–12 Swiss Cup =

Tournament details
- Country: Switzerland
- Teams: 64

Final positions
- Champions: FC Basel
- Runners-up: FC Luzern

Tournament statistics
- Top goal scorer: Igor Tadić (6)

The 2011–12 Swiss Cup was the 87th season of Switzerland's annual football cup competition. It began on 16 September 2011 with the first games of Round 1 and ended on 16 May 2012 with the Final in the Stade de Suisse in Bern. The winners of the competition, Basel, qualified for the play-off round of the 2012–13 UEFA Europa League as per the benefits of winning. The former title holders are FC Sion.

== Participating clubs ==
All ten Super League teams and fifteen Challenge League clubs (FC Vaduz are from Liechtenstein and thus play in the 2011–12 Liechtenstein Cup) entered the 2011-2011 competition, as well as 13 teams from 1. Liga and 26 teams from lower leagues. Teams from 1. Liga and below had to qualify through separate qualifying rounds within their leagues.

2011–12 Super League; 10 teams	2011–12 Challenge League; 15 teams	2011–12 1. Liga; 13 teams	Amateur teams 26 teams
FC Basel; Grasshoppers Zürich; FC Lausanne-Sport; FC Luzern; Neuchâtel Xamax; Servette FC; FC Sionth; FC Thun; BSC Young Boys; FC Zürich	FC Aarau; AC Bellinzona; FC Biel-Bienne; SC Brühl; FC Chiasso; SR Delémont; Étoile Carouge FC; SC Kriens; FC Locarno; AC Lugano; FC St. Gallen; Stade Nyonnais; FC Wil; FC Winterthur; FC Wohlen	FC Baden; GC Biaschesi; FC Breitenrain; SC Cham; SC Dornach; SC Düdingen; FC Grand-Lancy; FC Grenchen; ES FC Malley; FC Naters; FC Schötz; FC Tuggen; Yverdon-Sport FC	Fourth level: FC Chur 97; FC Collex-Bossy; US Collombey-Muraz; FC Entfelden; FC Eschenbach; FC Freienbach; FC Hergiswil; FC Langenthal; Losone Sportiva; FC Stade-Lausanne-Ouchy; US Terre-Sainte; FC Töss; Fifth level: FC Abtwil-Engelburg; FC Amicitia Riehen; FC Ascona; FC Colombier; FC Gumefens/Sorens; FC Herzogenbuchsee; FC Konolfingen; FC Renens; FC Schattdorf; FC United Zürich; Sixth level: FC Deitingen; FC Domdidier; FC Ellikon Marthalen; FC Henau

== Round 1 ==
Teams from Super League and Challenge League were seeded in this round. In a match, the home advantage was granted to the team from the lower league, if applicable. The games were played on 16, 17 and 18 September 2011.

Team 1	Score	Team 2
16 September 2011
FC Hergiswil	1–3	FC Locarno
FC Langenthal	1–3	Yverdon-Sport FC
17 September 2011
US Terre-Sainte	2–5 (a.e.t.)	SC Brühl
FC Deitingen	1–4	FC Schattdorf
FC Naters	1–5	FC St. Gallen
FC Stade-Lausanne-Ouchy	0–5	FC Thun
FC Konolfingen	1–2	FC Grand-Lancy
FC Collex-Bossy	1–8	FC Lausanne-Sport
FC Eschenbach	0–4	FC Basel
FC Henau	1–5	FC Wohlen
FC Herzogenbuchsee	1–3	FC Breitenrain
FC Abtwil-Engelburg	1–5	Stade Nyonnais
US Collombey-Muraz	0–5	FC Schötz
FC Amicitia Riehen	0–8	FC Aarau
FC Ascona	1–2	FC Chiasso
FC Ellikon Marthalen	3–10	FC Freienbach
FC Töss	0–10	Grasshoppers Zürich
FC United Zürich	1–5 (a.e.t.)	FC Lugano
FC Domdidier	0–8	BSC Young Boys
ES FC Malley	3–3 (a.e.t.) (p. 3–1)	SR Delémont
FC Grenchen	0–5	FC Zürich
FC Renens	1–4	FC Wil
18 September 2011
SC Cham	2–0	Étoile Carouge FC
FC Colombier	0–5	FC Sion
SC Düdingen	1–4 (a.e.t.)	Servette FC
FC Tuggen	3–0	SC Dornach
FC Chur 97	1–2	Neuchâtel Xamax
FC Entfelden	0–9	SC Kriens
Losone Sportiva	0–3	FC Luzern
FC Gumefens/Sorens	1–3	AC Bellinzona
FC Baden	0–1	FC Winterthur
GC Biaschesi	1–2	FC Biel-Bienne

== Round 2 ==
The winners of Round 1 played in this round. Teams from Super League were seeded, the home advantage was granted to the team from the lower league, if applicable. The games were played on 15 and 16 October 2011.

Team 1	Score	Team 2
15 October 2011
FC Breitenrain	1–2	FC Tuggen
FC Schattdorf	0–5	FC Lausanne-Sport
FC Schötz	1–5	FC Basel
FC Aarau	1–3	FC Zürich
FC Sion	2–1	Stade Nyonnais
Yverdon-Sport	1–3	Servette FC
FC Winterthur	2–0	SC Brühl
ES FC Malley	0–1	AC Bellinzona
16 October 2011
SC Cham	1–5	FC Wohlen
FC Chiasso	0–1	Grasshoppers Zürich
FC Freienbach	0–4	BSC Young Boys
FC Grand-Lancy	1–3	FC Luzern
SC Kriens	2–1	Neuchâtel Xamax
FC Lugano	0–1 (a.e.t.)	FC Biel/Bienne
FC St. Gallen	2–0	FC Thun
FC Locarno	1–1 (a.e.t.) (p. 4–5)	FC Wil

== Round 3 ==
The winners of Round 2 played in this round, the home advantage was granted to the team from the lower league, if applicable. The games were played on 26–27 November 2011.

Team 1	Score	Team 2
26 November 2011
FC Tuggen	1–2	FC Sion
AC Bellinzona	0–4	FC Lausanne-Sport
FC Wil	2−3 (a.e.t.)	FC Basel
27 November 2011
FC Biel-Bienne	3−0	Servette FC
FC St. Gallen	4−2	FC Zürich
SC Kriens	2–2 (a.e.t.) (p. 3–5)	Grasshoppers Zürich
FC Winterthur	1–1 (a.e.t.) (p. 3–2)	BSC Young Boys
FC Wohlen	1−2	FC Luzern

== Quarter-finals ==
The winners of Round 3 play in the Quarterfinals, there is no home advantage granted in the draw. The games will be played on the 20 and 21 March 2012.

20 March 2012
20:00

FC Luzern	3 – 0	Grasshoppers Zürich
Lezcano 42'; Ferreira 61'; Lustenberger 80'	Report

Swissporarena, Lucerne
Attendance: 7,034
Referee: Sascha Kever (Breganzona)

21 March 2012
19:30

FC Winterthur	2 − 2 (a.e.t.)	FC St. Gallen
Radice 26'; Bengondo 82'	Report	17' (yellow card) 55' Mathys; 19' Sutter
Penalties
Zuffi (penalty scored); Bengondo (penalty scored); Iten (penalty scored); Lenjani (penalty scored); Sereinig (penalty scored)	5 − 4	(penalty scored) Scarione; (penalty scored) Jagne; (penalty scored) Montandon; (penalty scored) Muntwiler; (penalty missed) Regazzoni

Stadion Schützenwiese, Winterthur
Attendance: 8,500
Referee: Stephan Klossner (Willisau)

21 March 2012
19:45

FC Basel	5 − 2	FC Lausanne-Sport
Katz 24' (o.g.); Streller 50', 89'; A. Frei 59' (pen.); F. Frei 90+2'	Report	45', 71' Roux

St. Jakob-Park, Basel
Attendance: 8,028
Referee: Cyril Zimmermann (Münsingen)

21 March 2012
20:15

FC Biel-Bienne	1 − 3	FC Sion
Doudin (yellow card) 65' (red card) 90+3' (goal) 21'; Rafael Schweizer (yellow card) 34'; Sallaj (yellow card) 90+1'	Report	9' Yoda; (yellow card) 54' Wüthrich; (yellow card) 68' Obradović; 82' Vanczák; 90+4' (pen.) Danilo

Gurzelen Stadion, Biel/Bienne
Attendance: 3,938
Referee: Adrien Jaccottet (Basel)

== Semi-finals ==
The winners of Quarterfinals play in the Semifinals, there is no home advantage granted in the draw. The games were played on the 11 and 15 April 2012.

11 April 2012
20:15

FC Sion	0 – 1	FC Luzern
Adaílton (yellow card) 9'; Sauthier (yellow card) 19'; Bühler (yellow card) 57'	Report	7' Winter; (yellow card) 12' Ohayon

Stade Tourbillon, Sion
Attendance: 12,000
Referee: Stephan Studer (Bellmund)

15 April 2012
14:00

FC Winterthur	1 – 2	FC Basel
Bengondo (yellow card) 42'; Lüscher (yellow card) 68'; Kuzmanovic (yellow card) 45' (goal) 90+3' (pen.)	Report	(yellow card) 26' Yapi; 38' Streller; (yellow card) 64' F. Frei; 89' (yellow card) 90+4' A. Frei

Stadion Schützenwiese, Winterthur
Attendance: 8,500 (sold out)
Referee: Alain Bieri (Bern)

== Final ==
The Final was played between the two Semifinal winners and took place at Stade de Suisse in Bern.

16 May 2012
20:30 CEST
Final

Basel	1–1 (a.e.t.)	Luzern
Dragović (yellow card) 40'; Huggel 56' (1:0); G. Xhaka (yellow card) 90'	SFV summary FCB summary	(yellow card) 57' Wiss; 67' (1:1) Puljić; (yellow card) 90' Gygax
Penalties
Yapi Yapo (penalty scored); Streller (penalty scored); Zoua (penalty scored); Shaqiri (penalty scored)	4–2	(penalty scored) Renggli; (penalty missed) Ohayon; (penalty scored) Gygax; (penalty missed) Stahel

Stade de Suisse, Bern
Attendance: 30,100
Referee: (Switzerland) Daniel Wermelinger

GK	(Switzerland) Yann Sommer
DF	(Germany) Markus Steinhöfer
DF	(Argentina) David Abraham
DF	(Austria) Aleksandar Dragović	(yellow card) 40'	(substituted off) 72'
DF	(South Korea) Park Joo-Ho
MF	(Switzerland) Xherdan Shaqiri
MF	(Switzerland) Benjamin Huggel (cap)		(substituted off) 96'
MF	(Switzerland) Granit Xhaka	(yellow card) 90'
MF	(Switzerland) Valentin Stocker		(substituted off) 73'
ST	(Switzerland) Alexander Frei
ST	(Switzerland) Marco Streller
Substitutes:
DF	(Czech Republic) Radoslav Kováč		(substituted on) 72'
FW	(Cameroon) Jacques Zoua		(substituted on) 73'
FW	(Ivory Coast) Gilles Yapi		(substituted on) 96'
Manager:
(Germany) Heiko Vogel

GK	(Switzerland) David Zibung
DF	(France) Sally Sarr
DF	(Switzerland) Florian Stahel
DF	(Croatia) Tomislav Puljić
DF	(Switzerland) Claudio Lustenberger
MF	(Switzerland) Alain Wiss	(yellow card) 57'
MF	(Switzerland) Michel Renggli
MF	(Switzerland) Adrian Winter
MF	(Switzerland) Xavier Hochstrasser		(substituted off) 60'
FW	(Switzerland) Nelson Ferreira		(substituted off) 104'
ST	(Paraguay) Dario Lezcano		(substituted off) 95'
Substitutes:
MF	(Switzerland) Daniel Gygax	(yellow card) 90'	(substituted on) 60'
ST	(Albania) Jahmir Hyka		(substituted on) 95'
FW	(Israel) Moshe Ohayon		(substituted on) 104'
Manager:
(Switzerland) Murat Yakin
