= 2009–10 FC Luzern season =

FC Luzern
- Chairman: Walter Stierli
- Manager: Rolf Fringer
- Stadium: Stadion Allmend
- Swiss Super League: 4th
- Swiss Cup: Quarter-finals
- Top goalscorer: League: Cristian Florin Ianu (21); All: Cristian Florin Ianu (21)
- Average home league attendance: 7,548
- Biggest win: Luzern 6–0 Aarau

The 2009–10 season was the 85th season in the history of Fussball-Club Luzern and the club's fourth consecutive season in the top flight of Swiss football.

== Pre-season and friendlies ==
Win Draw Loss

8 July 2009 Friendly	Luzern (Switzerland)	0–0	(Switzerland) FC Wil	Switzerland
19:00 CEST (UTC+2)

== Competitions ==
=== Overall record ===
Competition	First match	Last match	Starting round	Final position	Record							
Competition	First match	Last match	Starting round	Final position	Pld	W	D	L	GF	GA	GD	Win %
Swiss Super League	19 July 2009	16 May 2010	Matchday 1	4th	36	17	7	12	66	55	+11	47.22
Swiss Cup	19 September 2009	10 December 2009	Round 1	Quarter-finals	4	3	0	1	10	8	+2	75.00
Total					40	20	7	13	76	63	+13	50.00

Source: Competitions

=== Swiss Super League ===
==== League table ====
Pos	Team	Pld	W	D	L	GF	GA	GD	Pts	Qualification or relegation
2	Young Boys	36	25	2	9	78	47	+31	77	Qualification to Champions League third qualifying round
3	Grasshopper	36	21	2	13	65	43	+22	65	Qualification to Europa League play-off round (Note: Basel, who have already qualified for the 2010–11 UEFA Champions League, played Challenge League side Lausanne-Sport in the 2009–10 Swiss Cup final. Basel have won the cup, thus 3rd-placed team will qualify for the play-off round and the 4th-placed team will be inserted into the third qualifying round of the UEFA Europa League and Lausanne-Sport will be inserted into the 2010–11 UEFA Europa League 2nd qualifying round.)
4	Luzern	36	17	7	12	66	55	+11	58	Qualification to Europa League third qualifying round
5	Sion	36	14	9	13	63	57	+6	51	
6	St. Gallen	36	13	7	16	53	56	−3	46	

Source: axposuperleague.ch (in German)
Rules for classification: 1) points; 2) goal difference; 3) number of goals scored.

==== Results summary ====
Overall								Home						Away					
Pld	W	D	L	GF	GA	GD	Pts	W	D	L	GF	GA	GD	W	D	L	GF	GA	GD
36	17	7	12	66	55	+11	58	12	1	5	46	23	+23	5	6	7	20	32	−12

Source: Swiss Super League

==== Results by round ====
Round	1	2	3	4	5	6	7	8	9	10	11	12	13	14	15	16	17	18	19	20	21	22	23	24	25	26	27	28	29	30	31	32	33	34	35	36
Ground	A	A	H	A	H	H	A	H	A	H	H	A	H	A	A	H	A	H	H	A	H	A	A	H	A	H	A	H	A	H	A	H	H	A	H	A
Result	L	W	W	D	W	L	L	W	W	L	W	D	L	D	D	W	D	W	W	L	W	W	L	L	L	L	W	W	L	D	L	W	W	D	W	W
Position																																				

Source: Swiss Super League
A = Away; H = Home; W = Win; D = Draw; L = Loss

==== Matches ====
19 July 2009 Round 2	Bellinzona	1–2	Luzern	Bellinzona
16:00 CEST (UTC+2)				Stadium: Stadio Comunale Bellinzona

22 July 2009 Round 1	Sion	3–1	Luzern	Sion
19:45 CEST (UTC+2)				Stadium: Stade Tourbillon

26 July 2009 Round 3	Luzern	2–1	Grasshopper	Lucerne
16:00 CEST (UTC+2)				Stadium: Stadion Allmend

2 August 2009 Round 4	Basel	1–1	Luzern	St. Jakob-Park, Basel
16:00 CEST	Streller 13' (1:0); Safari (yellow card) 51'	Summary	(yellow card) 55' Lustenberger; 86' (1:1) Ianu	Attendance: 23,201; Referee: (Switzerland) Cyril Zimmermann

9 August 2009 Round 5	Luzern	2–1	Neuchâtel Xamax	Lucerne
16:00 CEST (UTC+2)				Stadium: Stadion Allmend

16 August 2009 Round 6	Luzern	1–2	Young Boys	Lucerne
16:00 CEST (UTC+2)				Stadium: Stadion Allmend

22 August 2009 Round 7	Zürich	4–0	Luzern	Zürich
17:45 CEST (UTC+2)				Stadium: Letzigrund

29 August 2009 Round 8	Luzern	3–1	St. Gallen	Lucerne
17:45 CEST (UTC+2)				Stadium: Stadion Allmend

13 September 2009 Round 9	Aarau	2–4	Luzern	Aarau
16:00 CEST (UTC+2)				Stadium: Stadion Brügglifeld

24 September 2009 Round 10	Luzern	1–2	Sion	Lucerne
19:45 CEST (UTC+2)				Stadium: Stadion Allmend

27 September 2009 Round 11	Luzern	2–0	Bellinzona	Lucerne
16:00 CEST (UTC+2)				Stadium: Stadion Allmend

3 October 2009 Round 12	Grasshopper	0–0	Luzern	Zürich
17:45 CEST (UTC+2)				Stadium: Letzigrund

25 October 2009 Round 13	Luzern	4–5	Basel	Gersag, Emmenbrücke
16:00	Chiumiento 3' (1:1); Yakin (yellow card) 17'; Renggli 22' (2:2) (penalty); Frimpong (yellow card) 32'; Yakin 79' (3:3); Ianu 87' (4:3)	Summary	2' (0:1) Huggel; 8' (1:2) A. Frei; (yellow card) 17' Safari; (yellow card) 32' Çağdaş; (yellow card) 66' A. Frei; (yellow card) 69' Streller; 73' (2:3) Streller; 90+1' (4:4) A. Frei; 90+4' (4:5) Streller	Attendance: 8,695; Referee: (Switzerland) Kever

29 October 2009 Round 14	Neuchâtel Xamax	1–1	Luzern	Neuchâtel
19:45 CET (UTC+1)				Stadium: Stade de la Maladière

1 November 2009 Round 15	Young Boys	1–1	Luzern	Bern
16:00 CET (UTC+1)				Stadium: Stade de Suisse

8 November 2009 Round 16	Luzern	1–0	Zürich	Lucerne
16:00 CET (UTC+1)				Stadium: Stadion Allmend

28 November 2009 Round 17	St. Gallen	1–1	Luzern	St. Gallen
17:45 CET (UTC+1)				Stadium: Kybunpark

6 December 2009 Round 18	Luzern	6–0	Aarau	Lucerne
16:00 CET (UTC+1)				Stadium: Stadion Allmend

7 February 2010 Round 19	Luzern	4–2	Grasshopper	Lucerne
16:00 CET (UTC+1)				Stadium: Stadion Allmend

13 February 2010 Round 20	Young Boys	2–1	Luzern	Bern
17:45 CET (UTC+1)				Stadium: Stade de Suisse

21 February 2010 Round 21	Luzern	2–1	Bellinzona	Lucerne
16:00 CET (UTC+1)				Stadium: Stadion Allmend

28 February 2010 Round 22	Aarau	1–2	Luzern	Aarau
16:00 CET (UTC+1)				Stadium: Stadion Brügglifeld

7 March 2010 Round 23	Zürich	1–0	Luzern	Zürich
16:00 CET (UTC+1)				Stadium: Letzigrund

14 March 2010 Round 24	Luzern	0–1	Basel	Gersag, Emmenbrücke
16:00	Lambert (yellow card) 32'	Summary	33' (0:1) Huggel; (yellow card) 52' Inkoom; (yellow card) 54' Shaqiri; (yellow card) 79' Safari	Attendance: 8,597; Referee: (Switzerland) Cyril Zimmermann (46. (Switzerland) Jérôme Laperrière)

20 March 2010 Round 25	Sion	5–2	Luzern	Sion
17:45 CET (UTC+1)				Stadium: Stade Tourbillon

24 March 2010 Round 26	Luzern	2–3	St. Gallen	Lucerne
19:45 CET (UTC+1)				Stadium: Stadion Allmend

28 March 2010 Round 27	Neuchâtel Xamax	1–2	Luzern	Neuchâtel
16:00 CEST (UTC+2)				Stadium: Stade de la Maladière

3 April 2010 Round 28	Luzern	2–1	Neuchâtel Xamax	Lucerne
17:45 CEST (UTC+2)				Stadium: Stadion Allmend

11 April 2010 Round 29	St. Gallen	3–1	Luzern	St. Gallen
16:00 CET (UTC+1)				Stadium: Kybunpark

14 April 2010 Round 30	Luzern	1–1	Sion	Lucerne
19:45 CEST (UTC+2)				Stadium: Stadion Allmend

14 April 2010 Round 31	Basel	5–0	Luzern	St. Jakob-Park, Basel
16:00	da Silva 10' (1:0); Shaqiri 14' (2:0); Stocker 43' (3:0); Stocker 56' (4:0); Carlitos 73' (5:0)	Summary	(yellow card) 37' Wiss; (yellow card) 90' Veškovac	Attendance: 30,571; Referee: (Switzerland) Daniel Wermelinger

24 April 2010 Round 32	Luzern	4–1	Zürich	Lucerne
17:45 CEST (UTC+2)				Stadium: Stadion Allmend

2 May 2010 Round 33	Luzern	4–0	Aarau	Lucerne
16:00 CEST (UTC+2)				Stadium: Stadion Allmend

6 May 2010 Round 34	Bellinzona	0–0	Luzern	Bellinzona
19:45 CEST (UTC+2)				Stadium: Stadio Comunale Bellinzona

13 May 2010 Round 35	Luzern	5–1	Young Boys	Lucerne
20:15 CEST (UTC+2)				Stadium: Stadion Allmend

16 May 2010 Round 36	Grasshopper	0–1	Luzern	Zürich
16:00 CEST (UTC+2)				Stadium: Letzigrund
