= Adekunle Lukmon =

Nigerian footballer (born 1984)

Personal information
- Full name: Adekunle Babatunde Lukmon
- Date of birth: 10 October 1984 (age 42)
- Place of birth: Lagos, Nigeria
- Height: 1.77 m (5 ft 10 in)
- Position: Centre-back

Senior career*
Years	Team	Apps	(Gls)
2004–2005	Borac Čačak	11	(0)
2005–2006	Vëllazërimi	32	(5)
2006–2008	Rabotnički	38	(4)
2008–2013	FC Luzern	39	(1)
2011–2012	→ SC Kriens (loan)	11	(0)
2014–2016	Zug 94	40	(2)
2016–2017	FC Sursee	7	(1)
- * Club domestic league appearances and goals

Babatunde Luqmon Adekunle (born 10 October 1984) is a Nigerian retired footballer.

== Career ==
Lukmon played as 20-year-old in the 2004–05 First League of Serbia and Montenegro with FK Borac Čačak and moved one year later to Vëllazërimi Kičevo in Macedonia. From June 2006 to December 2008, he was under contract by FK Rabotnički where he contributed a lot to the success of the team, playing a big part in the Qualifiers to the UEFA Champions League 2008–09.

On 22 December 2008, the Swiss Super League Club confirmed the signing of Lukmon on a four-and-a-half-year contract with FC Luzern after a Swiss agent discovered him in a Champions League qualifying match against FC Inter Baku in Azerbaijan and brought him to FC Luzern. He got off to a sensational start with the team in the beginning of 2009.

In summer 2011, after having already played two league matches for Luzern in the 2011–12 season, Lukmon agreed to a one-year loan deal to play for SC Kriens in the Swiss Challenge League. At SC Kriens in the 2011–12 season he played 13 times in total for the club while on loan

On July 1, 2014 Adekunle signed for Swiss team Zug 94 having been released by FC Luzern. He scored his first goal for his new club against FC Grenchen in a 9–0 win.

== Honours ==
Rabotnički

- Macedonian First Football League: 2007–08
- Macedonian Football Cup: 2007–08

Luzern

- Swiss Cup runner-up: 2011–12
