= Jacques Zoua =

Cameroonian footballer (born 1991)

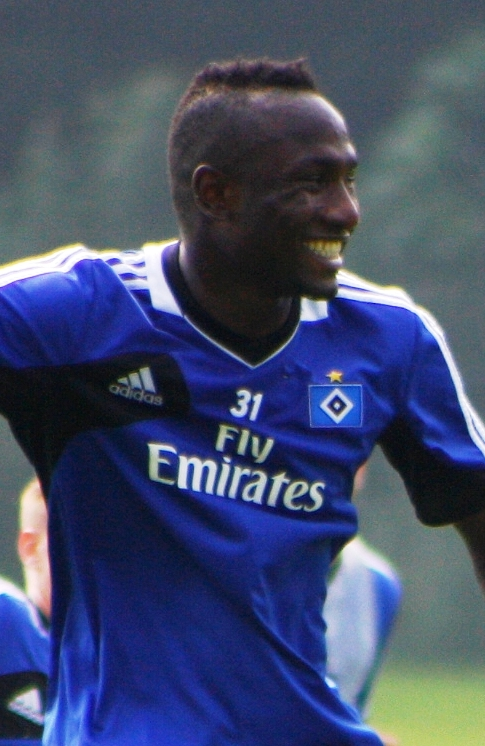
- Zoua at practice with HSV in 2013

Personal information
- Full name: Jacques Zoua Daogari
- Date of birth: 6 September 1991 (age 35)
- Place of birth: Garoua, Cameroon
- Height: 1.86 m (6 ft 1 in)
- Position: Striker

Senior career*
Years	Team	Apps	(Gls)
2008–2009	Coton Sport		(26)
2009–2013	Basel	86	(14)
2013–2015	Hamburger SV	27	(2)
2014–2015	→ Erciyesspor (loan)	23	(8)
2015–2016	Gazélec Ajaccio	31	(5)
2016–2017	Kaiserslautern	21	(6)
2017–2018	Beerschot Wilrijk	8	(0)
2018–2019	Astra Giurgiu	20	(1)
2019–2020	Viitorul Constanța	6	(1)
2020–2021	AS Futuro		
2021 -2023	Al-Ahly Tripoli		
2024-2025	AS Trouville-Deauville		

International career^{‡}
2009	Cameroon U-20	7	(3)
2011–2021	Cameroon	26	(0)
Medal record
Men's football
Representing Cameroon
Africa Cup of Nations
Winner	2017 Gabon
- * Club domestic league appearances and goals as of 20:21, 4 May 2020 (UTC) ‡ National team caps and goals as of 06:45, 24 June 2026 (UTC)

Jacques Zoua Daogari (born 6 September 1991) is a Cameroonian professional footballer who plays as a striker.

== Club career ==
=== Cotonsport Garoua ===
On 22 September 2008, Zoua signed a two-year contract with Cotonsport Garoua.

=== Basel ===
After a successful test game 31 March 2009 Zoua transferred to and signed his contract with FC Basel in Switzerland on his 18th Birthday. He joined Basel's first team for their 2009–10 season under head coach Thorsten Fink. He was first included in the first team squad in November 2009 and played his first game for the club against rivals FC Zürich in the Swiss Cup on 20 November. His first game in a starting position was on 15 March 2010 against FC Luzern. He scored his first league goal for the club on 24 March 2010 in the 4–1 home win against FC Zürich.

At the end of the 2009–10 season, Zoua won the national Double with Basel and a year later won League Championship title again. At the end of the 2011–12 season, he won his second Double, the League Championship title and the Swiss Cup with the club.

In a long season for Basel with a total of 76 games (62 in League, Cup, European Champions League, Europa League and 14 test matches) Zoua had a total of 53 appearances. At the end of the Swiss Super League season 2012–13 he won the Championship title and was Swiss Cup runner up with Basel. In the 2012–13 UEFA Europa League, Basel advanced as far as the semi-finals, there being matched against the reigning UEFA Champions League holders Chelsea, but they were knocked out, losing both home and away ties, beaten 2–5 on aggregate.

Between the years 2009 and 2013 Zoua played a total of 177 games for Basel scoring a total of 52 goals. 86 of these games were in the Swiss Super League, 14 in the Swiss Cup, 28 in the UEFA competitions (Champions League and Europa League) and 49 were friendly games. He scored 14 goals in the domestic league, seven in the cup, three in the Champions League and the other 28 were scored during the test games.

=== Hamburger SV ===
In June 2013, Zoua signed for Hamburger SV on a three-year contract.

=== Erciyesspor (loan) ===
On 29 August 2014, Zoua was loaned to Süper Lig club Erciyesspor.

=== Gazélec Ajaccio ===
In August 2015, Zoua signed for newly promoted Ligue 1 club Gazélec Ajaccio on a three-year deal.

=== 1. FC Kaiserslautern ===
On 12 August 2016, Zoua returned to Germany joining 1. FC Kaiserslautern on a three-year contract.

=== Beerschot ===
On 10 October 2017, Zoua joined Belgian Second Division club Beerschot Wilrijk.

=== Astra Giurgiu ===
On 7 September 2018, Zoua signed a three-year contract with Liga I club Astra Giurgiu.

=== Viitorul Constanța ===
On 25 October 2019, Zoua signed a one-year contract with a two-year extension option with Liga I club Viitorul Constanța. On 2 April 2020, Zoua was released from the club after having his contract mutually terminated.

=== Later career ===
After leaving Romania, Zoua returned to Cameroon. In September 2020, he was keeping fit with his former club Coton Sport. Even though it was reported that he had signed with the club in October 2020, it was later confirmed that he had signed with AS Futuro. He left the club by mutual agreement in July 2021.

In October 2021, Zoua signed with Libyan club Al-Ahly Tripoli. After spending two years in LIbya he had a season off from football before makinga return with AS Trouville-Deauville for the 2024-25 season.

== International career ==
Zoua was also a regular in the Cameroon youth squads. He took part in the 2009 African Youth Championship, where he scored three goals, but Cameroon lost in the final against Ghana 2–0. He also played in the squad at the 2009 FIFA U-20 World Cup, but his team finished last in the group C.

== Career statistics ==
As of matches played on 12 July 2019

Cameroon national team
Year	Apps	Goals
2011	2	0
2012	1	0
2013	2	0
2014	0	0
2015	4	0
2016	4	0
2017	8	0
2018	3	0
2019	2	0
Total	26	0

== Honours ==
Basel

- Swiss Super League: 2009–10, 2010–11, 2011–12, 2012–13
- Swiss Cup: 2009–10, 2011–12
- Uhrencup: 2011

Astra Giurgiu

- Cupa României runner-up: 2018–19

Cameroon

- Africa Cup of Nations: 2017
