= Nico Siegrist =

Swiss footballer (born 1991)

Personal information
- Date of birth: 6 September 1991 (age 35)
- Place of birth: Lucerne, Switzerland
- Height: 1.80 m (5 ft 11 in)
- Position: Striker

Team information
- Current team: SC Kriens
- Number: 30

Youth career
- 2002–2007: FC Luzern

Senior career*
Years	Team	Apps	(Gls)
2007–2008	SC Kriens		
2008–2013	FC Luzern	52	(8)
2012	→ FC Aarau (loan)	14	(2)
2012	→ AC Bellinzona (loan)	2	(1)
2013–2015	FC Biel-Bienne	64	(8)
2015–2020	SC Kriens	140	(57)
2020–2024	SC Cham	114	(29)
2024–	SC Kriens	73	(18)
- * Club domestic league appearances and goals as of 28 September 2026

Nico Siegrist (born 9 June 1991) is a Swiss football striker playing for SC Kriens in the Swiss Challenge League.

== Club career ==
=== FC Luzern ===
Nico began his career at FC Luzern and headed off to play one season at local team SC Kriens. He made his debut in the Swiss Super League during the 2008-09 season.

=== FC Aarau ===
In February 2012 Nico signed with FC Aarau of the Swiss Challenge League until the end of the 2011-12 season. On 11 February 2012, in his final game before heading to Aarau, Siegrist scored the equaliser for Luzern in a 1-1 draw away at FC Thun in the Arena Thun just 33 seconds after coming off the substitutes bench. Nico scored on his debut for Aarau on 19 February 2012, scoring after 15 minutes in a 3-2 defeat to FC Vaduz at the Rheinpark Stadion.
