= Dimitar Rangelov =

Bulgarian footballer (born 1983)

Dimitar Rangelov Димитър Рангелов
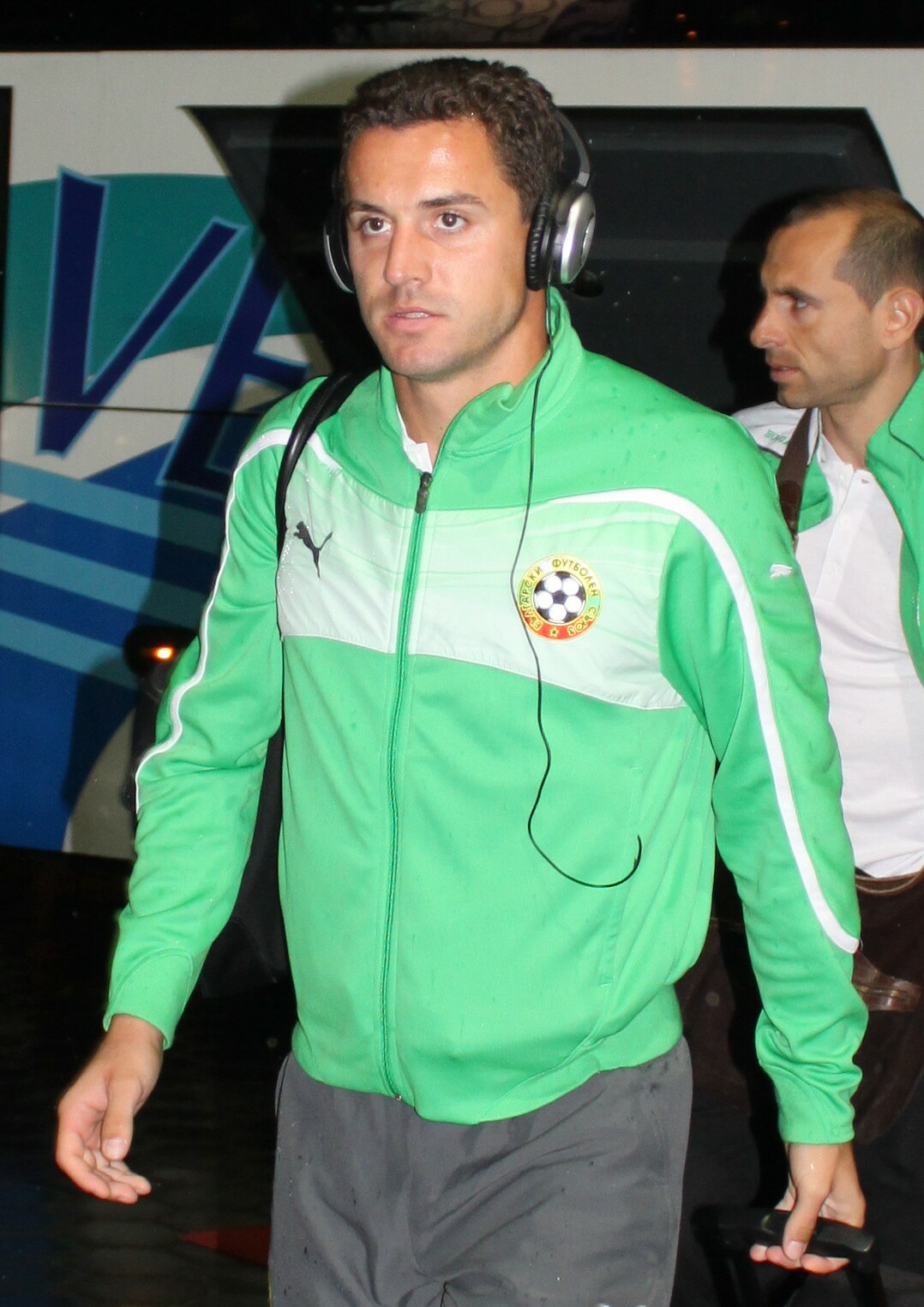

Personal information
- Full name: Dimitar Dimitrov Rangelov
- Date of birth: 9 February 1983 (age 43)
- Place of birth: Sofia, Bulgaria
- Height: 1.83 m (6 ft 0 in)
- Position: Second striker

Senior career*
Years	Team	Apps	(Gls)
2000–2006	Slavia Sofia	127	(32)
2006–2008	Strasbourg	15	(2)
2007	→ Erzgebirge Aue (loan)	16	(5)
2007–2008	→ Energie Cottbus (loan)	22	(6)
2008	→ Energie Cottbus II (loan)	1	(0)
2008–2009	Energie Cottbus	27	(9)
2009–2012	Borussia Dortmund	11	(1)
2010–2011	→ Maccabi Tel Aviv (loan)	22	(2)
2011–2012	→ Energie Cottbus (loan)	30	(12)
2012–2014	FC Luzern	54	(12)
2014–2017	Konyaspor	78	(13)
2017–2018	Ümraniyespor	27	(9)
2018–2020	Energie Cottbus	46	(18)
2020–2021	Slavia Sofia	26	(3)
2021–2022	VfB Krieschow	22	(12)
Total		524	(136)

International career
2004–2016	Bulgaria	40	(6)
- * Club domestic league appearances and goals

Dimitar Rangelov (Bulgarian: Димитър Рангелов; born 9 February 1983) is a Bulgarian former professional footballer who played as a second striker.

He made his debut for Bulgaria in 2004.

== Career ==
=== Slavia Sofia ===
Born in Sofia, Rangelov started playing football in local team Slavia. On 3 June 2000, then 17 years old, he made his official debut in professional football in a match against Beroe Stara Zagora as a 65th-minute substitute. Rangelov played for Slavia Sofia between 2000 and 2006.

=== Strasbourg ===
Rangelov was sold to RC Strasbourg for €1 million. In January 2007, he was loaned for six months to German side Erzgebirge Aue. After that, he moved to Energie Cottbus on a season-long loan and quickly developed into an important first team player at his new team.

=== Energie Cottbus ===
After the 2007–08 season, Rangelov signed permanently for Energie Cottbus. He made 49 appearances playing in the Bundesliga, scoring 15 goals.

=== Borussia Dortmund ===
On 16 June 2009, Rangelov officially signed his contract with Borussia Dortmund. The transfer fee was €1 million. His contract is for four years. On 20 March 2010, he scored his first goal in the Bundesliga for the Dortmund side in the 3–0 home win against Bayer Leverkusen.

==== Maccabi Tel Aviv (loan) ====
On 4 September 2010, Borussia Dortmund loaned him to Maccabi Tel Aviv until the end of the season with purchase option in the end. On 6 November 2010, Rangelov scored his first goal for Maccabi in the match against Hapoel Ashkelon. In April 2011 with the end of regular season (before the playoffs). Rangelov reached a mutual agreement on his release from Maccabi and his return to his original club Dortmund.

==== Return to Energie Cottbus (loan) ====
On 28 June 2011, Rangelov re-joined Energie Cottbus where he played between 2007 and 2009, signing a one-year loan deal. Rangelov ended the season in 2. Bundesliga with 12 goals to his name making him Energie's top scorer.

=== Luzern ===
On 11 July 2012, Rangelov joined Swiss Super League side FC Luzern on a two-year contract for an undisclosed fee, though media reports estimated it to be between €300,000 and £350,000. Four days later, he made his debut in a 1–1 home draw against FC Zürich, playing the full 90 minutes. On 11 August Rangelov netted his first goal, scoring a penalty against St. Gallen. He scored his first-ever European goal on 23 August, opening the scoring in a 2–1 home win over Genk in their Europa League play-offs first leg tie. A week later, in the second leg tie against Genk, Rangelov was sent off in the 37th minute.

=== Third Energie Cottbus stint ===
In October 2018, Rangelov joined Energie Cottbus for the third time in his career having signed a contract until the end of the season. As of 2019, he is the only Bulgarian to have scored at four different levels of the German league system.

=== Return to Slavia Sofia ===
After nearly 15 years playing abroad Rangelov returned to his childhood club Slavia Sofia by signing a contract with the club in July 2020.

=== VfB Krieschow ===
Rangelov moved to German club VfB Krieschow, playing in the fifth-tier NOFV-Oberliga Süd, in 2021. He left the club after the 2021–22 season.

== Career statistics ==
=== Club ===
Appearances and goals by club, season and competition
Club	Season	League			Cup		Europe		Total	
Club	Season	Division	Apps	Goals	Apps	Goals	Apps	Goals	Apps	Goals
Slavia Sofia	2000–01	A Group	5	0			–		5	0
Slavia Sofia	2001–02	A Group	24	3			–		24	3
Slavia Sofia	2002–03	A Group	24	4			–		24	4
Slavia Sofia	2003–04	A Group	21	10			–		21	10
Slavia Sofia	2004–05	A Group	27	8			–		27	8
Slavia Sofia	2005–06	A Group	26	7	1	0	–		27	7
Slavia Sofia	Total		127	32	1	0	0	0	128	32
Strasbourg	2006–07	Ligue 2	15	2	4	2	–		19	4
Erzgebirge Aue (loan)	2006–07	2. Bundesliga	16	5	0	0	–		16	5
Energie Cottbus (loan)	2007–08	Bundesliga	22	6	1	1	–		23	7
Energie Cottbus II (loan)	2007–08	Regionalliga Nord	1	0	0	0	–		1	0
Energie Cottbus	2008–09	Bundesliga	27	9	3	3	–		30	12
Borussia Dortmund	2009–10	Bundesliga	10	1	2	0	0	0	12	1
Borussia Dortmund	2010–11	Bundesliga	1	0	0	0	1	0	2	0
Borussia Dortmund	Total		11	1	2	0	1	0	14	1
Borussia Dortmund II	2009–10	3. Liga	2	0	0	0	–		2	0
Maccabi Tel Aviv (loan)	2010–11	Israeli Premier League	22	2	6	2	0	0	28	4
Energie Cottbus (loan)	2011–12	2. Bundesliga	30	12	1	0	–		31	12
FC Luzern	2012–13	Swiss Super League	28	1	1	0	2	1	31	2
FC Luzern	2013–14	Swiss Super League	26	11	5	6	–		31	17
FC Luzern	Total		54	12	6	6	2	1	62	19
Konyaspor	2014–15	Süper Lig	23	6	3	0	–		26	6
Konyaspor	2015–16	Süper Lig	29	4	8	1	–		37	5
Konyaspor	2016–17	Süper Lig	26	3	4	2	1	1	31	6
Konyaspor	Total		78	13	15	3	1	1	94	17
Ümraniyespor	2017–18	TFF First League	27	9	0	0	–		27	9
Energie Cottbus	2018–19	3. Liga	24	7	0	0	–		24	7
Energie Cottbus	2019–20	Regionalliga Nordost	22	11	1	0	–		23	11
Energie Cottbus	Total		46	18	1	0	0	0	47	18
Slavia Sofia	2020–21	Bulgarian First League	23	3	4	0	1	0	31	3
VfB Krieschow	2021–22	NOFV-Oberliga Süd	22	12	0	0	–		22	12
Career total			524	136	44	17	5	2	575	155

=== International ===
Appearances and goals by national team and year
National team	Year	Apps	Goals
Bulgaria	2004	2	0
Bulgaria	2005	0	0
Bulgaria	2006	0	0
Bulgaria	2007	0	0
Bulgaria	2008	3	0
Bulgaria	2009	8	1
Bulgaria	2010	8	1
Bulgaria	2011	2	0
Bulgaria	2012	3	1
Bulgaria	2013	3	0
Bulgaria	2014	1	0
Bulgaria	2015	4	1
Bulgaria	2016	6	2
Total		40	6

Scores and results list Bulgaria's goal tally first, score column indicates score after each Rangelov goal.

List of international goals scored by Dimitar Rangelov
No.	Date	Venue	Opponent	Score	Result	Competition
1	12 August 2009	Vasil Levski National Stadium, Sofia, Bulgaria	Latvia	1–0	1–0	Friendly
2	12 October 2010	Atatürk Olympic Stadium, Istanbul, Turkey	Saudi Arabia	1–0	2–0	Friendly
3	12 October 2012	Vasil Levski National Stadium, Sofia, Bulgaria	Denmark	1–0	1–1	2014 World Cup qualifier
4	13 October 2015	Vasil Levski National Stadium, Sofia, Bulgaria	Azerbaijan	2–0	2–0	UEFA Euro 2016 qualifier
5	29 March 2016	Philip II Arena, Skopje, Macedonia	Macedonia	1–0	2–0	Friendly
6	6 September 2016	Vasil Levski National Stadium, Sofia, Bulgaria	Luxembourg	1–0	4–3	2018 World Cup qualifier
