= Aleksandar Dragović =

Austrian footballer (born 1991)

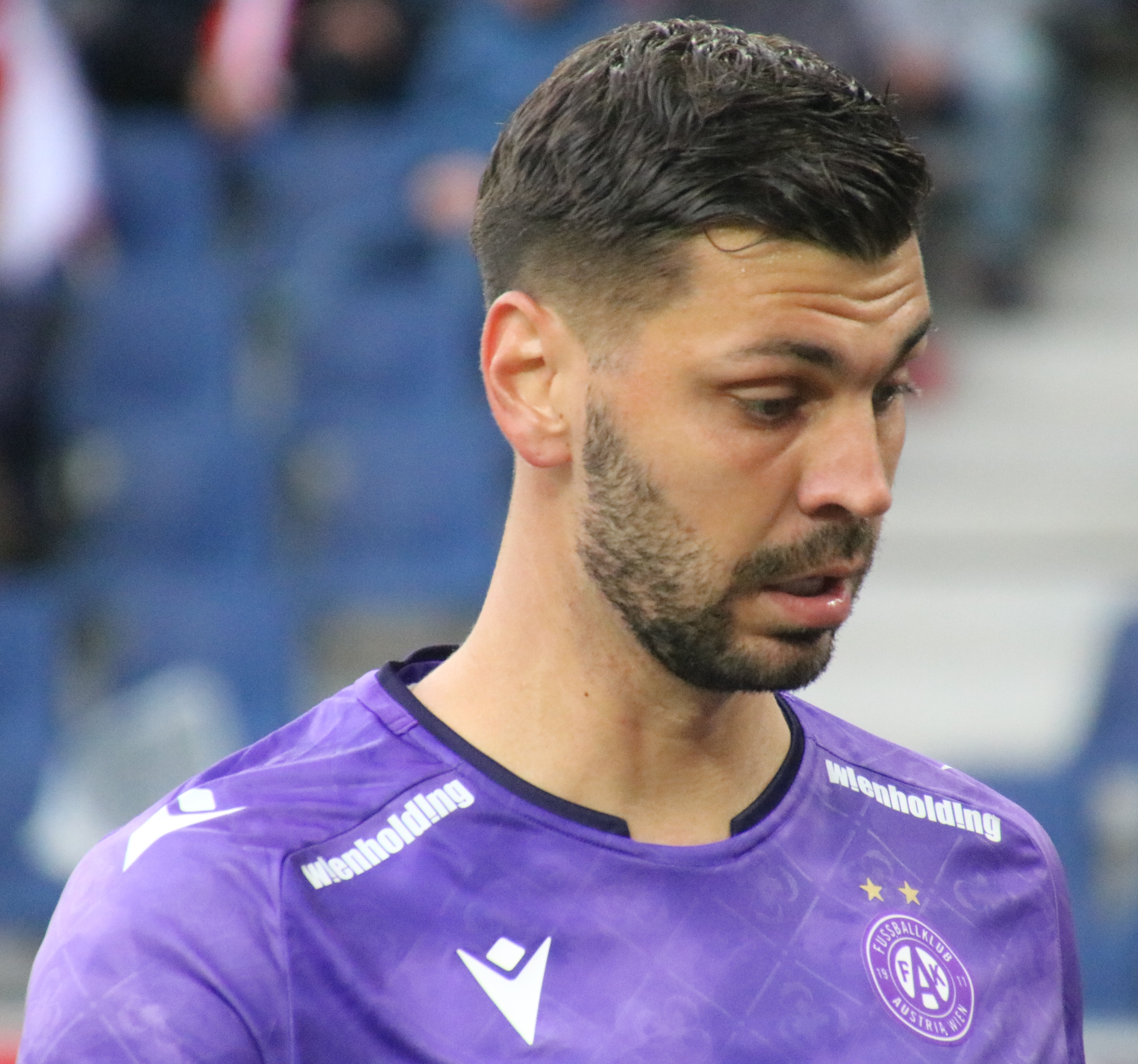
- Dragović with Austria Wien in 2024

Personal information
- Full name: Aleksandar Dragović
- Date of birth: 6 March 1991 (age 35)
- Place of birth: Vienna, Austria
- Height: 1.86 m (6 ft 1 in)
- Position: Centre-back

Team information
- Current team: Austria Wien
- Number: 15

Youth career
- 1997–2009: Austria Wien

Senior career*
Years	Team	Apps	(Gls)
2008–2009	Austria Wien II	8	(2)
2009–2011	Austria Wien	66	(1)
2011–2013	Basel	77	(4)
2013–2016	Dynamo Kyiv	66	(0)
2016–2021	Bayer Leverkusen	71	(3)
2017–2018	→ Leicester City (loan)	11	(0)
2021–2024	Red Star Belgrade	95	(7)
2024–	Austria Wien	57	(2)

International career
2007–2008	Austria U17	11	(2)
2008–2009	Austria U19	6	(2)
2009–2022	Austria	100	(2)
- * Club domestic league appearances and goals as of 10 June 2026

Aleksandar Dragović (Serbian Cyrillic: Александар Драговић, pronounced [aleksǎːndar drâɡoʋitɕ]; born 6 March 1991) is an Austrian professional footballer who plays as a centre-back for Austria Wien. He is well known for his performances as a tough-tackling centre-back.

== Club career ==
=== Austria Wien ===
Dragović started his career by playing in the youth teams of Austrian giants Austria Wien and started playing for their B-squad in 2007. In summer 2009 he advanced to their first team, for whom he played 66 championship games. There were also 15 games in the Europa League and 10 games in the Austrian Cup, which he won with Austria in 2009.

=== Basel ===
On 1 February 2011, Swiss Super League club FC Basel announced signing Dragović on a four-and-a-half-year contract. He joined Basel's first team during the winter break of their 2011–12 season under head coach Thorsten Fink. Dragović played his domestic league debut for his new club in the home game in the St. Jakob-Park on 12 February 2011 as Basel won 3–0 against FC St. Gallen. He was in the starting eleven of every match until the end of the 2010–11 Swiss Super League season and Dragović won the Swiss Championship title with Basel.

To the beginning of their 2011–12 season season Dragović was member of the Basel team that won the 2011 Uhrencup, beating both Hertha Berlin 3–0 and West Ham United 2–1 to lead the table on goal difference above Young Boys. The team entered the 2011–12 UEFA Champions League in the group stage. On 7 December 2011, during the Champions League group C match at home in the St. Jakob-Park Dragović helped Basel defeat Manchester United to make his team become the first Swiss club to advance to the knockout stage of a Champions League. Basel won the match 2–1, sending United out of the Champions league. But in the round of 16, despite a 1–0 home win against Bayern Munich, it was the German team who advanced to the next round.

Dragović scored his first league goal for his new club on 1 October 2011 in the 3–0 home win against Servette FC. At the end of the 2011–12 season he won the Double with his new club. They won the League Championship title with 20 points advantage. The team won the Swiss Cup, winning the final 4–2 in a penalty shootout against Luzern.

Basel had started in the 2012–13 UEFA Champions League in the qualifying rounds. But were knocked out of the competition by CFR Cluj in the play-off round. They then continued in the 2012–13 UEFA Europa League group stage. Ending the group in second position, Basel continued in the knockout phase. Dragović scored a goal in the second leg of quarter-final matches against Tottenham Hotspur, whom they beat 4–1 on penalties after a 4–4 aggregate draw to progress to the semi-finals. In the semi-finals, Basel were matched against the reigning UEFA Champions League holders Chelsea. Chelsea won both games advancing 5–2 on aggregate, eventually winning the competition. Basel played a total of 20 European matches that season. Dragović missed solely the second leg of the semi-final at Stamford Bridge due to a yellow card suspension, but had played in all the other European ties.

In the 2012–13 domestic championship Dragović played in 32 of the 36 games and he scored three goals. In the away game in the Stade de Genève on 3 March 2013 Dragović scored his team's first goal after Valentin Stocker played a pass from the bye-line backwards into the centre and Dragović slotted home from short range. After Servette had equalised, Dragović headed home a corner, taken by team captain Alex Frei, to the 2–1 final score. Celebrating his goal, Dragović raised his arm in gesture. But referee Sascha Amhof understood this as rude gesture against the Servette fans and showed the scorer a yellow card. Because this was his second card in the game, Dragović was dismissed. His third goal of the season was ten matchdays later in the home game in the St. Jakob-Park as Basel won 2–0 against the same opponent, Servette. At the end of the 2012–13 league season he won the Championship title with the team. In the 2012–13 Swiss Cup Basel reached the final, but were runners up behind Grasshopper Club, being defeated 4–3 on penalties, following a 1–1 draw after extra time.

On 26 July 2013, it was announced that Dragović was leaving Basel and had signed for Dynamo Kyiv. During his time with the club Dragović played a total of 142 games for Basel scoring a total of nine goals. 77 of these games were in the Swiss Super League, eight in the Swiss Cup, 27 in the UEFA competitions (Champions League and Europa League) and 30 were friendly games. He scored four goals in the domestic league, one in the European games and the other was scored during the test games.

=== Dynamo Kyiv ===
On 26 July 2013, Dragović had signed a five-year contract with Ukrainian club FC Dynamo Kyiv. On 17 May 2015, Dragović helped Dynamo beat Dnipro 1–0 which was the game that won Dynamo their first Ukrainian Premier League title in six years.

On 4 November 2015, Dragović scored his first ever UEFA Champions League goal in the group stage against Chelsea at Stamford Bridge on the 78th minute, as well as scoring an own goal on the 34th. Dynamo ended up losing that match 2–1. In that season he helped Dynamo reach the last sixteen of the UEFA Champions League for the first time in 16 years, getting knocked out by Manchester City 1–3 on aggregate.

=== Bayer 04 Leverkusen ===
On 22 August 2016, Dragović signed a five-year contract with German club Bayer 04 Leverkusen.

==== Leicester City (loan) ====
On 31 August 2017, Dragović joined Premier League club Leicester City on a season-long loan from Bayer Leverkusen.

=== Red Star Belgrade ===
On 26 May 2021, Dragović signed a three-year contract with Red Star Belgrade.

== International career ==
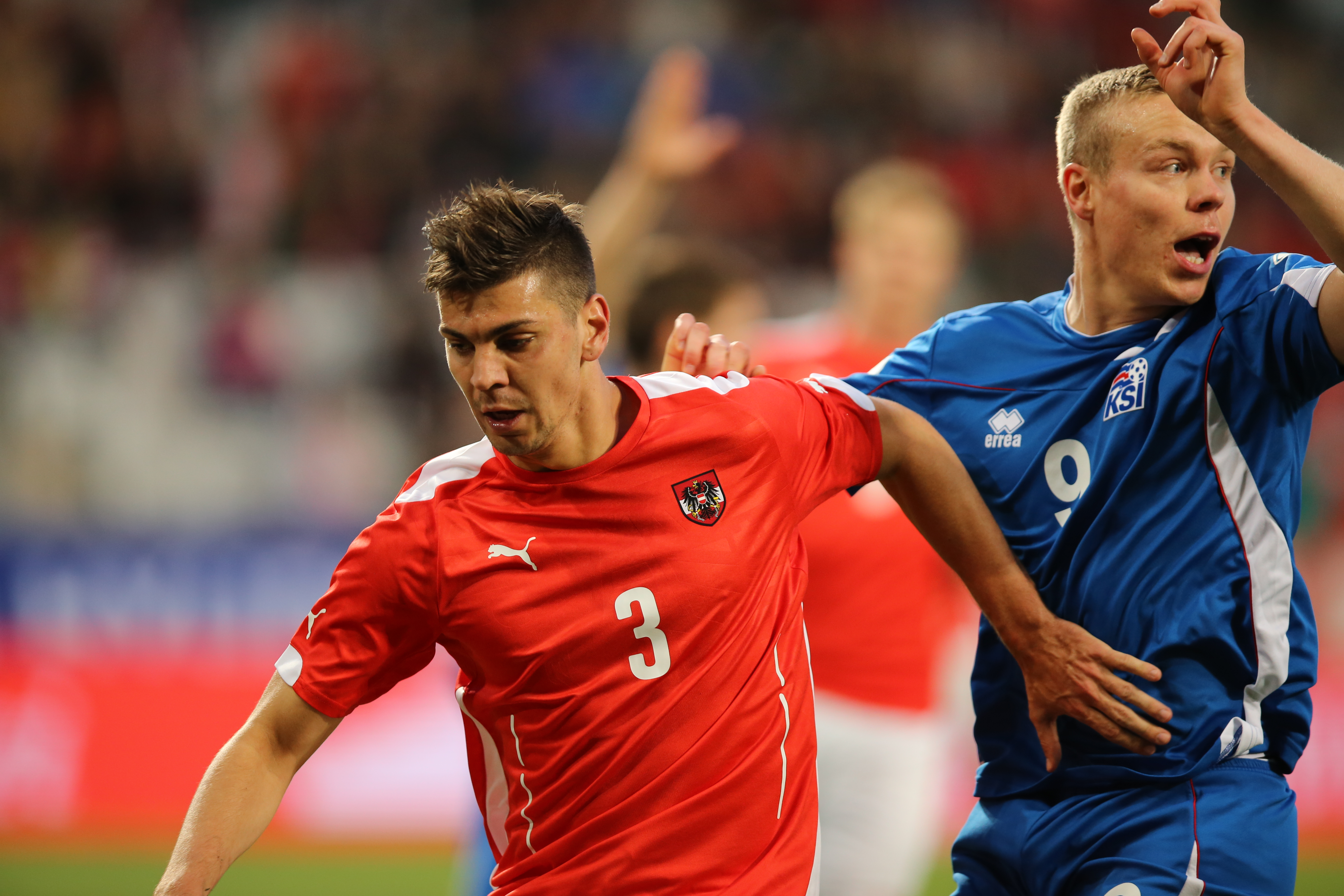
Dragović in action against Iceland in 2014

Dragović also used to be part of the national under-17 and under-19 Austrian teams. He was called up for the national team of Austria for their 2010 FIFA World Cup qualification match against Romania, but due to an injury he was unable to play. He was called up again by the Austrian head coach Dietmar Constantini for the match against Serbia. He made his international debut in this match on 6 June 2009. Dragović scored his first goal on 18 November 2014 in a 1–2 home defeat to Brazil.

He made the final squad for Euro 2016, where he was sent-off in the first game against Hungary, and missed a penalty in the decisive match against Iceland, which ended in a 2–1 defeat.

Dragović was part of the Austrian team which qualified to the Euro 2020 round of 16. On 29 March 2022, he played his 100th match for Austria in a 2–2 draw against Scotland.

== Personal life ==
Dragović was born in Vienna, Austria to Serbian parents from Belgrade. His favourite team is Red Star Belgrade, which he ended up joining in 2021.

In May 2012, Dragović attracted criticism in Swiss media for playfully slapping the Swiss defence and sport minister Ueli Maurer's bald head during FC Basel's Swiss Cup win medal ceremony. After making further comments about being reluctant to apologize—stating that "on the inside everybody knows, so I believe, that it was very, very much fun doing it"—Dragović reportedly traveled to the Bundeshaus in Bern in order to personally apologize to Maurer.

== Career statistics ==
=== Club ===
As of end of 2023—24 season

Appearances and goals by club, season and competition
Club	Season	League			National cup		League cup		Europe		Other		Total	
Club	Season	Division	Apps	Goals	Apps	Goals	Apps	Goals	Apps	Goals	Apps	Goals	Apps	Goals
Austria Wien II	2008–09	Austrian First League	8	2	—		—		—		—		8	2
Austria Wien	2008–09	Austrian Bundesliga	16	0	0	0	—		1 (Note: Appearance(s) in UEFA Europa League)	0	—		17	0
Austria Wien	2009–10	Austrian Bundesliga	32	0	1	0	—		9	0	—		42	0
Austria Wien	2010–11	Austrian Bundesliga	18	1	2	0	—		6	0	—		26	1
Austria Wien	Total		66	1	3	0	—		16	0	—		85	1
Basel	2010–11	Swiss Super League	16	0	1	0	—		0	0	—		17	0
Basel	2011–12	Swiss Super League	28	1	3	0	—		8 (Note: Appearance(s) in UEFA Champions League)	0	—		39	1
Basel	2012–13	Swiss Super League	32	3	3	0	—		19 (Note: >Six appearances in UEFA Champions League, thirteen appearances in UEFA Europa League)	0	—		54	3
Basel	2013–14	Swiss Super League	1	0	0	0	—		0	0	—		1	0
Basel	Total		77	4	7	0	—		27	0	—		111	4
Dynamo Kyiv	2013–14	Ukrainian Premier League	21	0	5	0	—		9	0	—		35	0
Dynamo Kyiv	2014–15	Ukrainian Premier League	24	0	6	1	—		10	0	1 (Note: Appearance in Ukrainian Super Cup)	0	41	1
Dynamo Kyiv	2015–16	Ukrainian Premier League	17	0	4	0	—		8	1	1	0	30	1
Dynamo Kyiv	2016–17	Ukrainian Premier League	4	0	0	0	—		—		1	0	5	0
Dynamo Kyiv	Total		66	0	15	1	—		27	1	3	0	111	2
Bayer Leverkusen	2016–17	Bundesliga	19	0	1	0	—		3	0	—		23	0
Bayer Leverkusen	2017–18	Bundesliga	1	0	0	0	—		0	0	—		1	0
Bayer Leverkusen	2018–19	Bundesliga	18	2	2	0	—		8	0	—		28	2
Bayer Leverkusen	2019–20	Bundesliga	15	0	4	0	—		6 (Note: >Three appearances in UEFA Champions League, three appearances in UEFA Europa League)	0	—		25	0
Bayer Leverkusen	2020–21	Bundesliga	18	1	3	0	—		8	1	—		29	2
Bayer Leverkusen	Total		71	3	10	0	—		25	1	—		106	4
Leicester City (loan)	2017–18	Premier League	11	0	2	0	3	0	—		—		16	0
Red Star Belgrade	2021–22	Serbian SuperLiga	34	4	5	0	—		13 (Note: Four appearances in UEFA Champions League, nine appearances in UEFA Europa League)	0	—		52	4
Red Star Belgrade	2022–23	Serbian SuperLiga	32	0	3	0	—		9 (Note: Four appearances in UEFA Champions League, five appearances in UEFA Europa League)	0	—		44	0
Red Star Belgrade	2023–24	Serbian SuperLiga	29	3	5	0	—		6	0	—		40	3
Red Star Belgrade	Total		95	7	13	0	—		28	0	—		136	7
Austria Wien	2024–25	Austrian Bundesliga	0	0	0	0	—		0	0	—		0	0
Career total			394	17	50	1	3	0	123	2	3	0	573	20

=== International ===
Appearances and goals by national team and year
National team	Year	Apps	Goals
Austria	2009	7	0
Austria	2010	2	0
Austria	2011	5	0
Austria	2012	4	0
Austria	2013	9	0
Austria	2014	8	0
Austria	2015	8	1
Austria	2016	11	0
Austria	2017	7	0
Austria	2018	9	0
Austria	2019	10	0
Austria	2020	6	0
Austria	2021	12	1
Austria	2022	2	0
Total		100	2

Scores and results list Austria's goal tally first, score column indicates score after each Dragović goal.

List of international goals scored by Aleksandar Dragović
No.	Date	Venue	Opponent	Score	Result	Competition
1	18 November 2014	Ernst-Happel-Stadion, Vienna, Austria	Brazil	1–1	1–2	Friendly
2	28 March 2021	Ernst-Happel-Stadion, Vienna, Austria	Faroe Islands	1–1	3–1	2022 FIFA World Cup qualification

== Honours ==
Austria Wien

- Austrian Cup: 2008–09

Basel

- Swiss Super League: 2010–11, 2011–12, 2012–13
- Swiss Cup: 2012

Dynamo Kyiv

- Ukrainian Premier League: 2014–15, 2015–16
- Ukrainian Cup: 2013–14, 2014–15
- Ukrainian Super Cup: 2016

Red Star Belgrade

- Serbian SuperLiga: 2021–22, 2022–23, 2023–24
- Serbian Cup: 2021–22, 2022–23, 2023–24

Individual

- Swiss Golden Player Award: "Best Defender" 2012
- Europa League team of the group stage: 2012
- Serbian SuperLiga Team of the Season: 2022–23

== See also ==
- List of men's footballers with 100 or more international caps
