= Mario Bühler =

Swiss footballer (born 1992)

Personal information
- Date of birth: 5 January 1992 (age 34)
- Place of birth: Emmen, Switzerland
- Height: 1.90 m (6 ft 3 in)
- Position: Centre back

Team information
- Current team: Cham
- Number: 29

Youth career
- 2000–2011: Luzern

Senior career*
Years	Team	Apps	(Gls)
2009–2013	Luzern U21	44	(5)
2011–2013	Luzern	9	(0)
2013–2015	Wohlen	63	(4)
2015–2019	Vaduz	90	(7)
2019–2020	Winterthur	28	(1)
2020–2022	Cham	38	(3)
2022–2024	Kriens	34	(0)
2024–	Cham	50	(1)

International career^{‡}
2011	Switzerland U19	2	(0)
2012	Switzerland U20	3	(0)
- * Club domestic league appearances and goals as of 1 October 2026 ‡ National team caps and goals as of 10 October 2012

Mario Bühler (born 5 January 1992) is a Swiss football defender who plays for Cham in the Swiss Promotion League.

== Club career ==
Bühler began his career at FC Luzern and has been with the club since 20 June 2000, when he was just eight years old.

On 27 August 2020, he signed with Cham.

On 27 May 2022, Bühler moved to Kriens.

== Honours ==
FC Vaduz

- Liechtenstein Football Cup (3): 2015-16, 2016-17, 2017-18
