= Nelson Ferreira (footballer) =

Swiss and Portuguese footballer (born 1982)

Personal information
- Full name: Nelson Ferreira
- Date of birth: May 26, 1982 (age 44)
- Place of birth: Interlaken, Switzerland
- Height: 1.75 m (5 ft 9 in)
- Position: Midfielder

Youth career
- FC Interlaken

Senior career*
| Years | Team | Apps | (Gls) |
| 2001–2008 | FC Thun | 171 | (14) |
| 2008–2012 | FC Luzern | 93 | (16) |
| 2012–2019 | FC Thun | 150 | (8) |
- * Club domestic league appearances and goals

Nelson Ferreira Coelho (born 26 May 1982) is a retired Swiss and Portuguese footballer. He last played for FC Thun.

== Career ==
He played for FC Thun from July 2001 until summer 2008. He joined FC Luzern in summer 2008. He played in the Champions League 2005/2006 Group Stage game against Arsenal FC at Highbury and scored the equalizer for FC Thun although the club lost the game 2–1 after Dennis Bergkamp scored an injury time winner.

In January 2011 Ferreira signed an extended contract to stay at Luzern until June 2014.

Ferreira retired at the end of the 2018-19 season.
