= Marijan Urtić =

Swiss footballer (born 1991)

Personal information
- Date of birth: 16 January 1991 (age 35)
- Place of birth: Lucerne, Switzerland
- Height: 1.81 m (5 ft 11 1/2 in)
- Position: Right back

Team information
- Current team: Luzern U21
- Number: 5

Youth career
- Luzern

Senior career*
| Years | Team | Apps | (Gls) |
| 2008–2013 | FC Luzern II | 33 | (0) |
| 2009–2013 | Luzern | 10 | (0) |
| 2011–2012 | → Kriens (loan) | 6 | (0) |
| 2013 | Kriens | 11 | (0) |
| 2014–2016 | Wohlen | 64 | (1) |
| 2016–2017 | Chiasso | 33 | (0) |
| 2017–2022 | Kriens | 128 | (2) |
| 2022–2023 | Wohlen | 21 | (4) |
| 2023– | Luzern U21 | 68 | (4) |
- * Club domestic league appearances and goals as of 26 June 2026

Marijan Urtić (born 16 January 1991) is a Swiss professional footballer who plays as a defender for Luzern U21.

== Career ==
On 8 July 2016, he joined FC Chiasso on a one-year contract.

In 2017, Urtić moved to SC Kriens.

On 11 July 2022, Urtić returned to Wohlen.
