= Moshe Ohayon =

Israeli footballer and manager

Personal information
- Full name: Shlomi Moshe Ohayon
- Date of birth: May 24, 1983 (age 43)
- Place of birth: Ashdod, Israel
- Height: 1.81 m (5 ft 11 1/2 in)
- Position: Midfielder

Team information
- Current team: Ashdod (assistant)

Youth career
- 1997–2000: Ashdod

Senior career*
| Years | Team | Apps | (Gls) |
| 2000–2006 | Ashdod | 137 | (14) |
| 2006–2008 | FC Winterthur | 45 | (10) |
| 2008 | Ashdod | 15 | (4) |
| 2008–2009 | Beitar Jerusalem | 12 | (1) |
| 2009–2011 | Ashdod | 82 | (21) |
| 2011–2012 | Legia Warsaw | 4 | (0) |
| 2012 | FC Luzern | 9 | (2) |
| 2012–2014 | Anorthosis Famagusta | 48 | (3) |
| 2014–2016 | Hapoel Tel Aviv | 29 | (2) |
| 2016–2018 | Ashdod | 34 | (1) |
| 2020–2021 | Beitar Ashdod | 0 | (0) |
| 2021 | Hapoel Gadera | 15 | (3) |
| 2021–2022 | Beitar Ashdod | 5 | (4) |
| 2023 | Maccabi Kiryat Malakhi | 5 | (0) |
| Total | | 414 | (58) |

International career
| 1999–2000 | Israel U16 | 19 | (1) |
| 2001 | Israel U19 | 4 | (1) |
| 2001–2005 | Israel U21 | 24 | (2) |
| 2007–2009 | Israel | 12 | (0) |

Managerial career
- 2019: Ashdod (interim manager)
- 2019–2023: Ashdod (assistant manager)
- * Club domestic league appearances and goals

Shlomi Moshe Ohayon (Hebrew: שלומי משה אוחיון; born 24 May 1983) is an Israeli former professional footballer who played as a midfielder and currently serves as an assistant manager of Ashdod.

== Club career ==
Ohayon was born in Ashdod. After six years in Israel, he moved at 2006 to the Swiss club Winterthur. He did not count as a foreign player in Switzerland because he is in possession of a French passport.

In the 2007–08 season in January, he transferred from Winterthur to Ashdod in the Israeli Premier League and helped it avoid relegation to the second league in Israel. In 15 games he scored 4 goals and made two assists.

In June 2008, Ohayon signed a three-year contract with Israeli champions and cup holders Beitar Jerusalem. On 21 January, he signed a 2.5-year contract with Ashdod.

On 27 July 2011, Ohayon signed a one-year contract with the Polish club Legia Warsaw with an option to extend it for another two years.

On 9 January 2012, Ohayon signed a one-year contract with the Swiss club FC Luzern with an option to extend it for another year. On 5 February 2012, Ohayon made his debut for the Swiss side. On 4 March 2011, he scored his first goal for Luzern, an equalizer in a 3–1 defeat against FC Basel at St. Jakob-Park.

On 21 September 2014, he signed with Hapoel Tel Aviv.

== International career ==
Ohayon made his debut for the Israel national team against Croatia on 13 October 2007.

== Honours ==
Legia Warsaw

- Polish Cup: 2011–12
