= Gabriel Wüthrich =

Swiss footballer (born 1981)

Personal information
- Date of birth: 28 August 1981 (age 45)
- Place of birth: Echallens, Switzerland
- Height: 1.85 m (6 ft 1 in)
- Position: Goalkeeper

Senior career*
Years	Team	Apps	(Gls)
1999–2000	FC Biel-Bienne	10	(0)
2000–2003	Neuchâtel Xamax	29	(0)
2003–2004	SR Delémont	17	(0)
2004–2006	FC St. Gallen	8	(0)
2006–2008	FC Vaduz	23	(0)
2009	FC Carl Zeiss Jena	0	(0)
2009–2010	AC Lugano	3	(0)
2010–2014	FC Luzern	0	(0)
- * Club domestic league appearances and goals as of 29 August 2008

Gabriel Wüthrich (born 28 August 1981) is a Swiss footballer who last played as goalkeeper for FC Luzern in the Swiss Super League.

== Career ==
Wüthrich began his professional career at FC Biel-Bienne in 1999 before he moved to Neuchâtel Xamax in 2000. He battled for the Number 1 jersey for his first two seasons at Neuchâtel and eventually became the first-choice goalkeeper during the 2002/03 season. He left to join SR Delémont in 2003. However, the move did not seem to pay off as he was no-longer first-choice and was used in a rotation system, only playing once every few weeks. At the end of the season, he moved to FC St. Gallen in the Swiss Super League where he was back-up to Stefano Razzetti. FC Vaduz acquired his services in 2006 and he was the undisputed Number 1 during his first season but when Swiss Under-21 internationalist goalkeeper Yann Sommer joined the club on loan from FC Basel in 2007, his gloves were given up to the youngster. Sommer's loan was re-newed for another season in 2008, effectively ending Wüthrich's chances of making the first-team for another season. He left on 21 January 2009 FC Vaduz and joined on 28 January 2009 to FC Carl Zeiss Jena. After the season ended his contract, he left the club and signed later on 3 July 2009 with AC Lugano.
