= Daniel Gygax =

Swiss footballer (born 1981)

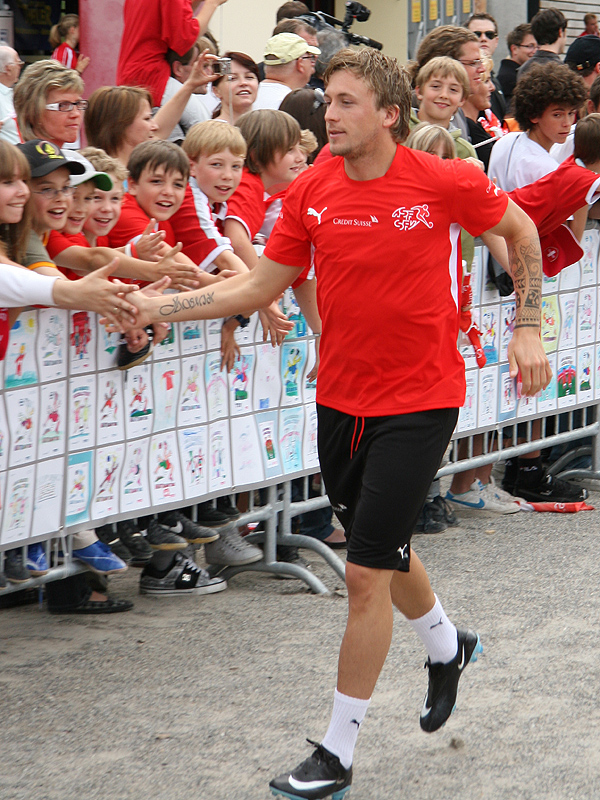
- Gygax meeting Swiss fans during Euro 2008

Personal information
- Full name: Daniel Gygax
- Date of birth: 28 August 1981 (age 45)
- Place of birth: Zürich, Switzerland
- Height: 1.79 m (5 ft 10 in)
- Positions: Winger; attacking midfielder

Youth career
- FC Baden

Senior career*
Years	Team	Apps	(Gls)
1998–2001	FC Zürich	5	(0)
2001	FC Winterthur	14	(1)
2001–2002	FC Aarau	21	(3)
2002–2005	FC Zürich	93	(16)
2005–2006	Lille	24	(4)
2007–2008	Metz	34	(5)
2008–2010	1. FC Nürnberg	30	(2)
2010–2014	FC Luzern	86	(17)
2014–2015	FC Aarau	37	(1)
2015–2016	FC Le Mont	19	(1)
2016–2017	Zug 94	14	(2)
Total		377	(52)

International career
2004–2008	Switzerland	35	(5)
- * Club domestic league appearances and goals

Daniel Gygax (born 28 August 1981) is a Swiss former professional footballer who played as a winger or attacking midfielder. He earned 35 caps for the Swiss national team, playing at two European Championships and the 2006 FIFA World Cup. At club level, Gygax played mostly for Swiss clubs but has also played in France for Lille and Metz, before moving to Germany to play for 1. FC Nürnberg.

== Club career ==
Gygax was born in Zürich.

On 7 July 2008, Gygax moved to 1. FC Nürnberg in Germany. He left the team on 30 June 2010 to join FC Luzern. Gygax along with another signing Hakan Yakin has helped their team to a surprise lead in the Swiss Super League with half of the season gone. He scored seven goals during the season.

Gygax retired at the end of the 2016–17 season, aged 35.

== International career ==
Gygax made his debut for the Swiss national team on 31 March 2004, replacing Hakan Yakin after 60 minutes of a 1–0 friendly loss to Greece in Heraklion. He scored his first goal on his fourth cap, the only goal in a friendly win over Liechtenstein on 6 June. At Euro 2004, he played in Switzerland's last two group games, and he also played the first two group games at the 2006 FIFA World Cup. His last of 35 internationals was on 11 June 2008, as a late substitute in a group game against Turkey at Euro 2008 which the Swiss co-hosted.

== Career statistics ==
No.	Date	Venue	Opponent	Score	Result	Competition	Ref.
1.	6 June 2004	Hardturm, Zürich, Switzerland	Liechtenstein	1–0	1–0	Friendly	
2.	9 February 2005	Maktoum Bin Rashid Al Maktoum Stadium, Dubai, United Arab Emirates	United Arab Emirates	1–0	2–1	Friendly	
3.	7 September 2005	GSP Stadium, Strovolos, Cyprus	Cyprus	3–1	3–1	2006 FIFA World Cup qualification	
4.	1 March 2006	Hampden Park, Glasgow, Scotland	Scotland	2–0	3–1	Friendly	
5.	31 May 2006	Stade de Genève, Lancy, Switzerland	Italy	1–1	1–1	Friendly	

== Honours ==
FC Zürich

- Swiss Cup: 2004–05
