= Xavier Hochstrasser =

Swiss footballer (born 1988)

Personal information
- Full name: Xavier Daniel Hochstrasser
- Date of birth: 1 July 1988 (age 38)
- Place of birth: Onex, Switzerland
- Height: 5 ft 11 in (1.80 m)
- Position: Defensive midfielder

Team information
- Current team: FC Onex

Youth career
- 1999–2003: FC Onex
- 2003–2005: Étoile Carouge

Senior career*
Years	Team	Apps	(Gls)
2005–2006	Servette	26	(2)
2006–2011	Young Boys	123	(12)
2011	→ Padova (loan)	6	(0)
2011–2014	Luzern	68	(6)
2014–2015	Lausanne-Sport	16	(1)
2015–2016	FC Le Mont	30	(3)
2016	Nyon		
2017–	FC Onex		

International career
2007–2011	Switzerland U21	19	(2)
2012	Switzerland Olympic	3	(0)
- * Club domestic league appearances and goals as of 6 April 2017 (UTC)

Xavier Daniel Hochstrasser (born July 1, 1988), is a Swiss footballer who currently plays for FC Onex as a defensive midfielder or a winger. He is known for his superb crossing and ability to set up goals, and specializes in corner kicks.

== Career ==
=== Early years ===
Xavier enjoyed a productive and ultimately successful development into a senior player with BSC Young Boys, playing with the youth teams of his hometown club FC Onex and then later Etoile Carouge. Between 2005 and 2006, he also spent one year on the books of Swiss giants Servette, scoring 31 goals in 68 games whilst playing as a winger for their reserve team but failing to make the grade as a senior with the club.

=== BSC Young Boys ===
Xavier's form with Servette's B-team attracted the attentions of BSC Young Boys, who upon learning of Servette's plans to release him at the end of the 2005/2006 Super League season signed the teenager on a free transfer in June 2006. He made an instant impact, scoring a fine goal during only his fourth league appearance and finishing his début season with 1 goal from 17 Super League appearances, playing predominantly as right winger, and an impressive tally of eleven assists. He would go on the better this in the 2009/2010 Super League season, when in just 34 matches he set up an incredible 15 goals for his teammates (the most assists by a single player in Europe that season) and also scored four himself in what still remains his most productive season to date.

== International career ==
He has 8 caps and 2 goals for the Switzerland national under-21 football team, earning his first cap in 2007 and completing his transition to the senior level Switzerland national football team in October 2009, when he was called up to the squad that would be expected to take part in the exhibition games leading up to and the qualifying matches for the 2010 FIFA World Cup. He was not used by coach Ottmar Hitzfeld for any of these games however, and failed to make the squad that took part in the tournament in South Africa in summer 2010. He represented Switzerland at the 2012 Summer Olympics.
