= Adrian Winter =

Swiss footballer (born 1986)

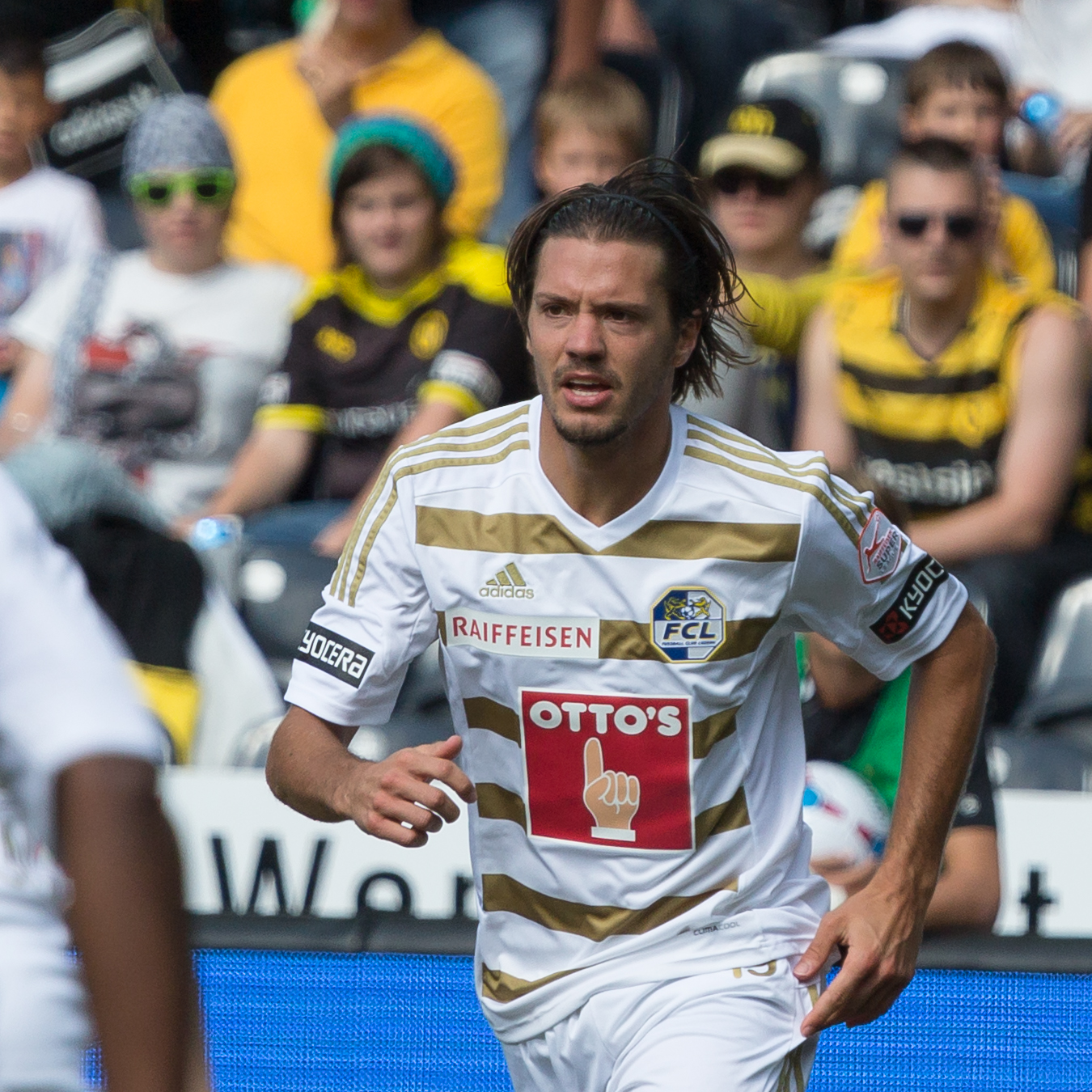
- Adrian Winter with FC Luzern in 2014

Personal information
- Date of birth: 8 July 1986 (age 40)
- Place of birth: Thalwil, Switzerland
- Height: 1.78 m (5 ft 10 in)
- Position: Attacking midfielder

Senior career*
Years	Team	Apps	(Gls)
2005–2007	FC Red Star Zürich	50	(11)
2007–2009	FC Wil 1900	33	(3)
2009–2011	FC St. Gallen	63	(7)
2011–2015	FC Luzern	130	(15)
2015–2016	Orlando City	22	(5)
2016–2021	FC Zürich	118	(17)

International career
2012	Switzerland	1	(0)
- * Club domestic league appearances and goals as of 13:10, 3 June 2021 (UTC)

Adrian Winter (born 8 July 1986) is a Swiss former professional footballer who plays as an attacking midfielder. Winter has also been capped for Switzerland. As of March 2024, he plays in the Swiss third-tier team FC Wädenswil.

== Career ==
In July 2015, it was announced that Winter was acquired by Major League Soccer team Orlando City SC. Winter made his debut for Orlando City on 8 August as a 72nd-minute substitution for Servando Carrasco. He later scored his first two MLS goals in a 3–1 win over Sporting Kansas City on 13 September. After playing well into the 2016 MLS season, Winter parted ways with Orlando City on 1 July due to family reasons and returned to Switzerland to play for FC Zürich. He made his league debut for Zürich in a 2-0 home victory on 25 July 2016 over FC Winterthur. He played all ninety minutes of the match. He scored his first league goal for the club not long later, on 6 August 2016 in a 4-0 home victory over FC Wohlen. His goal, the third of the match, came in the 40th minute.
