= Tomislav Puljić =

Croatian footballer

Personal information
- Full name: Tomislav Puljić
- Date of birth: 21 March 1983 (age 43)
- Place of birth: Zadar, Croatia
- Height: 1.92 m (6 ft 3 1/2 in)
- Position: Centre back

Team information
- Current team: Emmenbrücke
- Number: 13

Youth career
- NK Zadar
- 1997–2001: Dinamo Zagreb

Senior career*
Years	Team	Apps	(Gls)
2001–2002	Dinamo Zagreb		
2001–2002	→ Lokomotiva (loan)		
2002–2004	Velebit		
2004–2005	NK Arbanasi		
2005–2006	Lučko		(6)
2006–2008	Croatia Sesvete	27	(2)
2008–2009	Segesta	28	(0)
2009–2010	Lokomotiva	26	(4)
2010–2017	Luzern	134	(15)
2017–2019	Vaduz	45	(5)
2019–2020	Emmenbrücke	6	(1)
- * Club domestic league appearances and goals

Tomislav Puljić (born 21 March 1983) is a Croatian retired footballer who last played as a defender for the Swiss amateur side FC Emmenbrücke.

== Career ==
In January 2011, Puljic signed an extended contract to stay at Luzern until June 2014.

Before the 2019–20 season, Puljić joined FC Emmenbrücke.

== Honours ==
FC Vaduz

- Liechtenstein Football Cup (1): 2017-18
