= Sally Sarr =

Mauritanian footballer (born 1986)

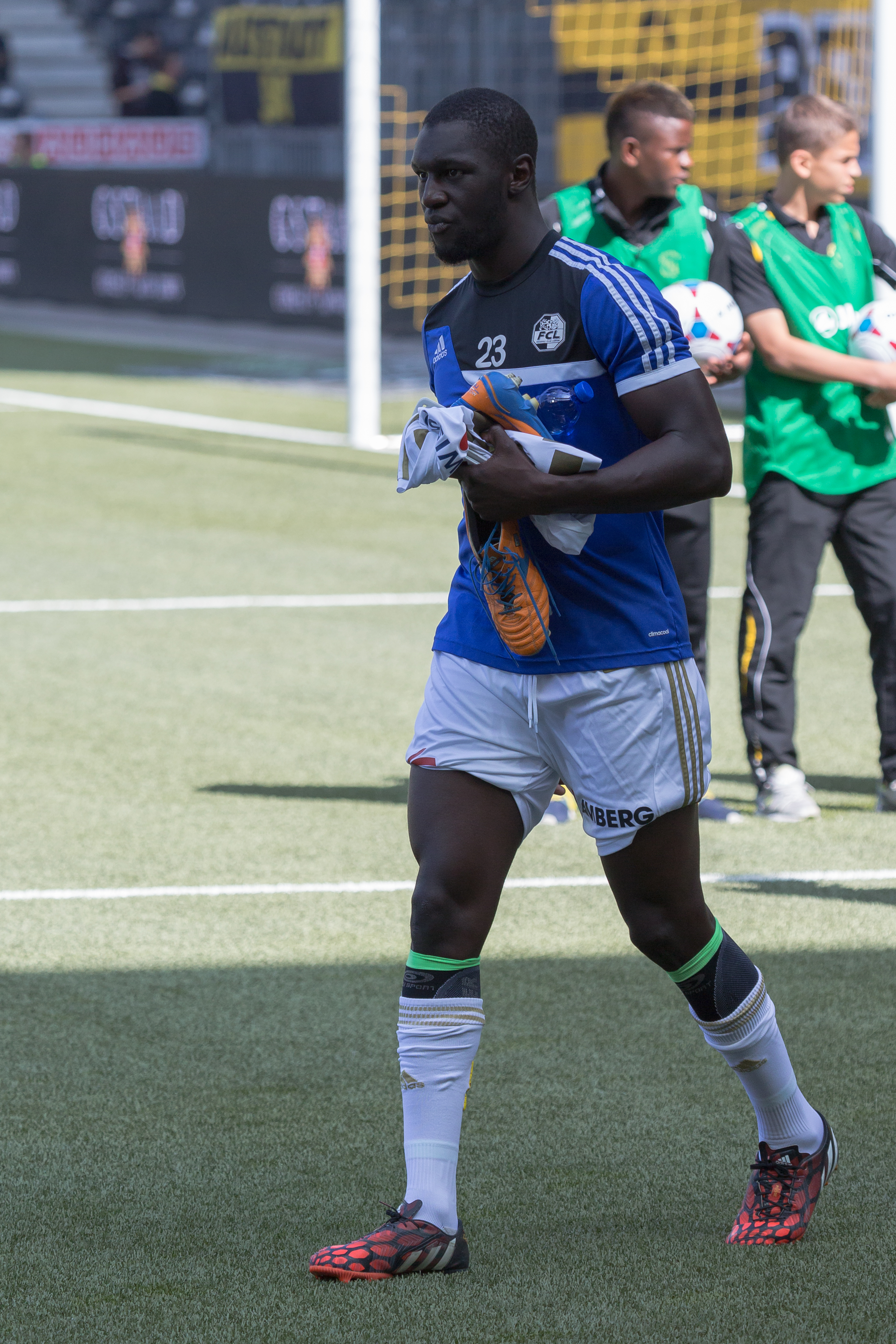

Personal information
- Full name: Sally Sarr
- Date of birth: May 6, 1986 (age 40)
- Place of birth: Le Havre, France
- Height: 1.78 m (5 ft 10 in)
- Position: Defender

Team information
- Current team: Étoile Carouge
- Number: 13

Senior career*
Years	Team	Apps	(Gls)
2006–2007	Le Havre		
2007–2009	Thrasyvoulos F.C.	25	(0)
2009–2011	FC Wil	51	(0)
2011–2017	Luzern	100	(5)
2017–2019	Servette	37	(0)
2019–	Étoile Carouge	14	(0)

International career^{‡}
2016–	Mauritania	1	(0)
- * Club domestic league appearances and goals as of 9 November 2019 ‡ National team caps and goals as of 4 September 2016

Sally Sarr (born 6 May 1986) is a French-born Mauritanian footballer who plays as a defender for Étoile Carouge in the Swiss Promotion League.

== Club career ==
Sarr began his career in his native France with Le Havre AC before leaving to join Greek side Thrasyvoulos F.C. in 2006. He spent three years with them but only manager 25 games during this time. In 2009, he moved to Switzerland to play for FC Wil in the Challenge League, helping the club to a respectable 3rd-placed finish. In 2009–10, he was part of the side that finished 6th in the Challenge League and in 2010–11, he impressed enough to earn a move to FC Luzern, stepping up to play in the Swiss Super League. Early into his Luzern career, he impressed enough to earn the nickname "Sally Sarr Superstar". He has previously been likened to Lilian Thuram.

== International career ==
Sarr made his debut for the Mauritania football team in a 2017 Africa Cup of Nations qualification 1–1 tie with South Africa.

== Dance ==
Sally is known for his unique belly flop dance, which he usually celebrates with.
