= David Zibung =

Swiss footballer (born 1984)

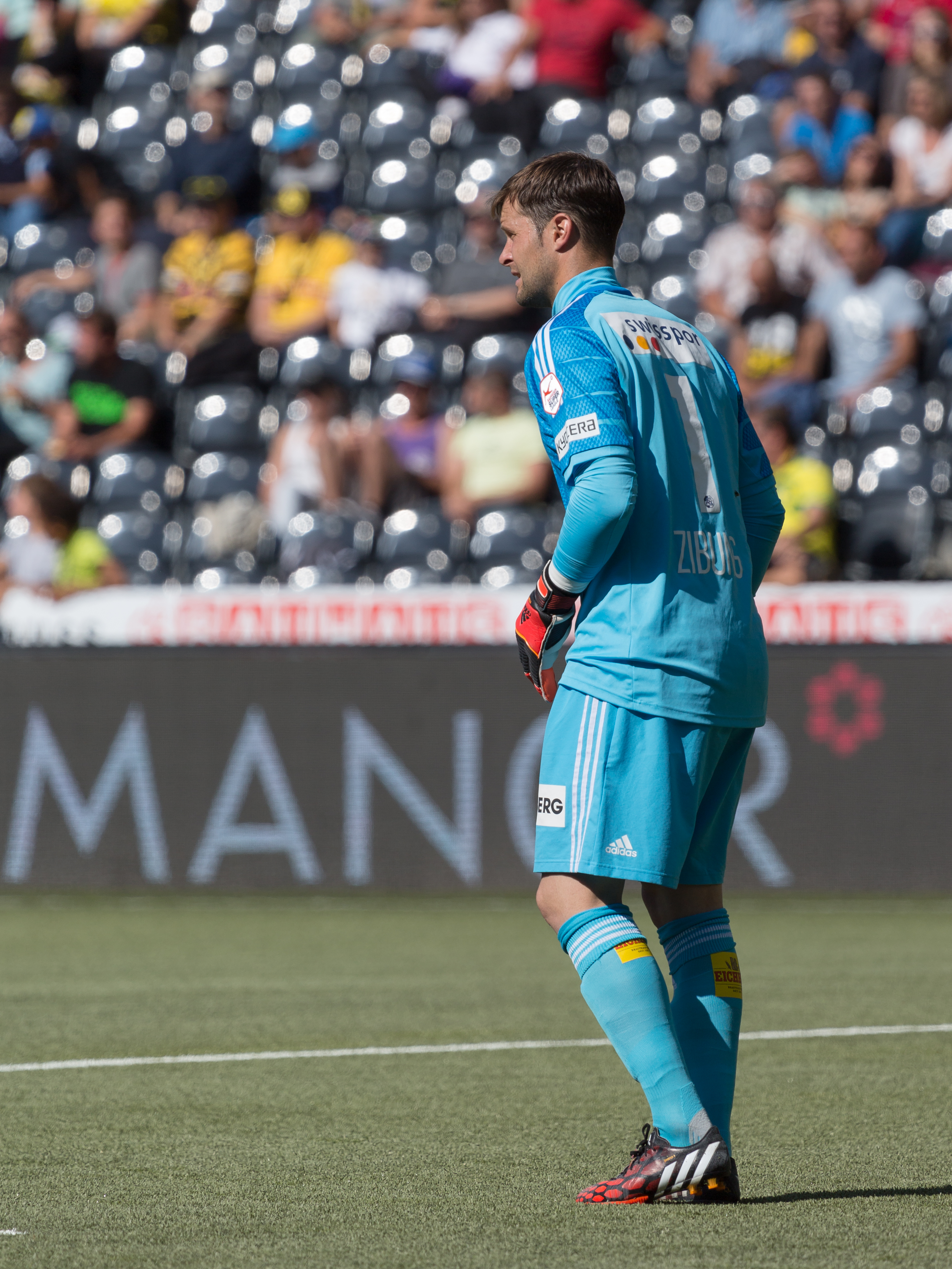
- Zibung playing for Luzern in 2014

Personal information
- Full name: David Zibung
- Date of birth: 10 January 1984 (age 42)
- Place of birth: Hergiswil, Switzerland
- Height: 1.87 m (6 ft 2 in)
- Position: Goalkeeper

Youth career
- 1999–2003: Luzern

Senior career*
Years	Team	Apps	(Gls)
2003–2021	Luzern	469	(1)
- * Club domestic league appearances and goals as of 21 May 2021

David Zibung (born 10 January 1984) is a Swiss former professional footballer who played as a goalkeeper. He spent his entire career from 2003 to 2021 playing for Luzern in Switzerland.
