= Claudio Lustenberger =

Swiss footballer (born 1987)

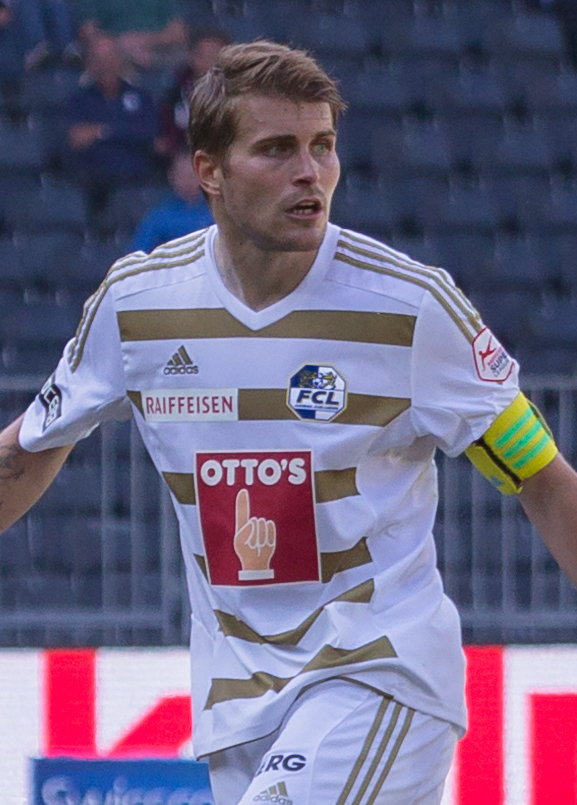
- Lustenberger with Luzern in 2014

Personal information
- Date of birth: 6 January 1987 (age 39)
- Place of birth: Luzern, Switzerland
- Height: 1.83 m (6 ft 0 in)
- Positions: Left-back; centre-back

Team information
- Current team: Luzern (assistant coach)

Youth career
- 1993–2003: Kriens

Senior career*
Years	Team	Apps	(Gls)
2003–2006	Kriens	63	(1)
2006–2019	Luzern	354	(6)
Total		417	(7)

International career
2007–2008	Switzerland U21	5	(1)
- * Club domestic league appearances and goals

Claudio Lustenberger (born 6 January 1987) is a Swiss football coach and former professional player who played as a left-back and centre-back for Kriens and Luzern. He served as captain of Luzern, but lost that role after injury. He retired from playing in May 2019, remaining with the club as a coach.

He also played for the Switzerland under-21 national team.

As of April 2026 he was an assistant coach at Luzern.
