= Alain Wiss =

Swiss footballer (born 1990)

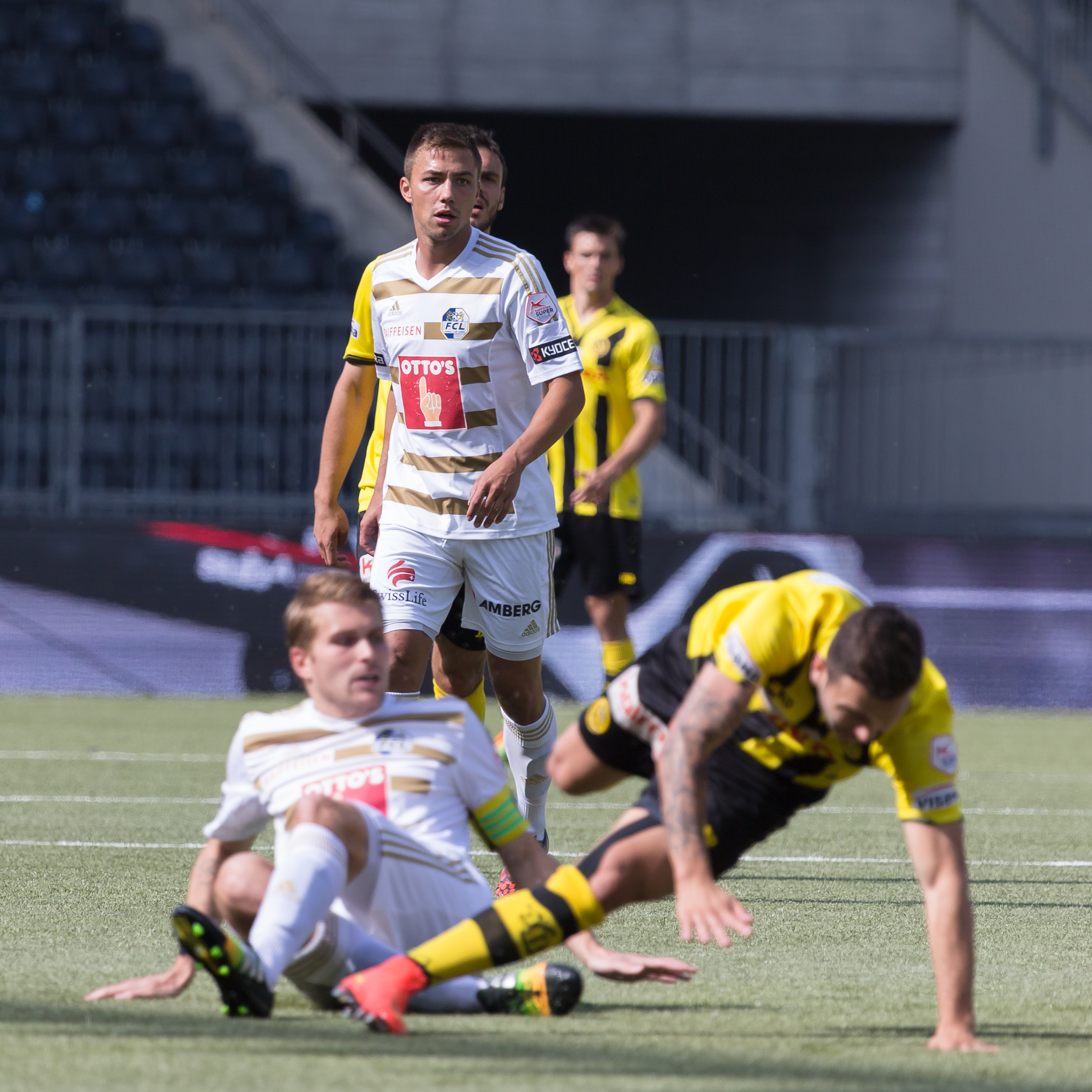
- Wiss playing for FC Luzern against BSC Young Boys in 2014

Personal information
- Date of birth: 21 August 1990 (age 36)
- Place of birth: Littau, Switzerland
- Height: 1.80 m (5 ft 11 in)
- Position: Midfielder

Team information
- Current team: Cham
- Number: 6

Youth career
- 2002–2006: Luzern

Senior career*
| Years | Team | Apps | (Gls) |
| 2007–2013 | Luzern II | 6 | (0) |
| 2007–2015 | Luzern | 200 | (10) |
| 2015–2019 | St. Gallen | 80 | (3) |
| 2019 | St. Gallen II | 3 | (0) |
| 2020–2021 | SCR Altach | 24 | (0) |
| 2021– | Cham | 42 | (1) |

International career^{‡}
| 2006–2007 | Switzerland U17 | 8 | (0) |
| 2008 | Switzerland U18 | 4 | (0) |
| 2008–2009 | Switzerland U19 | 9 | (2) |
| 2009–2010 | Switzerland U20 | 9 | (0) |
| 2010–2012 | Switzerland U21 | 12 | (0) |
| 2012 | Switzerland Olympic | 3 | (0) |
| 2012– | Switzerland | 2 | (0) |
- * Club domestic league appearances and goals as of 1 July 2024 ‡ National team caps and goals as of 25 May 2016

Alain Wiss (born 21 August 1990) is a Swiss professional football midfielder who plays for Cham.

== Club career ==
Wiss made his first-team debut for Luzern on 29 July 2007, replacing Pascal Bader in the 20th minute.

Wiss joined Swiss Super League club FC St. Gallen on a free transfer in July 2015, signing a two-year contract in the process.

== International career ==
Wiss made his debut for the senior national team of his country on 26 May 2012, in the 5–3 win over Germany in a friendly match after coming on as a late substitute. He had previously appeared at the 2012 Summer Olympics for the Swiss team.
