= Michel Renggli =

Swiss footballer (born 1980)

Personal information
- Full name: Michel Renggli
- Date of birth: 19 March 1980 (age 46)
- Place of birth: Switzerland
- Position: Midfielder

Senior career*
Years	Team	Apps	(Gls)
1999–2003	SC Kriens	123	(25)
2003–2004	FC Wil	36	(3)
2004–2005	FC Thun	34	(7)
2005–2008	Grasshopper-Club Zurich	100	(10)
2008–2014	FC Luzern	98	(8)
- * Club domestic league appearances and goals as of 14 May 2008

Michel Renggli (born 19 March 1980) is a retired Swiss footballer who last played as midfielder for FC Luzern in the Swiss Super League.
