= 2013–14 in Swiss football =

Football in Switzerland
- Season: 2013–14

Men's football
- Super League: Basel
- Challenge League: Vaduz
- Promotion League: Le Mont
- Swiss Cup: Zürich

The following is a summary of the 2013–14 season of competitive football in Switzerland.

== Men's national team ==
The home team is on the left column; the away team is on the right column.

Win Draw Loss

=== 2014 World Cup qualification ===
6 September 2013	Switzerland	4 – 4	Iceland	Bern, Switzerland
20:30 CEST	Lichtsteiner 15', 30'; Schär 27'; Džemaili 54' (pen.)	Report	3', 68', 90+1' Guðmundsson; 56' Sigþórsson	Stadium: Stade de Suisse; Attendance: 26'000; Referee: Sergei Karasev (Russia)

10 September 2013	Norway	0 – 2	Switzerland	Oslo, Norway
19:00 CEST		Report	12', 51' Schär	Stadium: Ullevaal Stadion; Attendance: 16'631; Referee: Howard Webb (England)

11 October 2013	Albania	1 – 2	Switzerland	Tirana, Albania
20:30 CET	Salihi 89'	Report	48' Shaqiri; 79' Lang	Stadium: Qemal Stafa Stadium; Attendance: 14'000; Referee: Pedro Proença (Portugal)

15 October 2013	Switzerland	1 – 0	Slovenia	Bern, Switzerland
20:30 CET	Xhaka 72'	Report		Stadium: Stade de Suisse; Attendance: 22'014; Referee: Björn Kuipers (Netherlands)

=== 2014 FIFA World Cup ===
15 June 2014	Switzerland	2 – 1	Ecuador	Brasília, Brazil
18:00 CEST	Mehmedi 48'; Seferovic 90+3'	Report	22' E. Valencia	Stadium: Estádio Nacional Mané Garrincha; Attendance: 68'351; Referee: Ravshan Irmatov (Uzbekistan)

20 June 2014	Switzerland	2 – 5	France	Salvador, Brazil
21:00 CEST	Džemaili 81'; Xhaka 87'	Report	17' Giroud; 18' Matuidi; 40' Valbuena; 67' Benzema; 73' Sissoko	Stadium: Arena Fonte Nova; Attendance: 51'003; Referee: Björn Kuipers (Netherlands)

25 June 2014	Honduras	0 – 3	Switzerland	Manaus, Brazil
21:00 CEST		Report	6', 31', 71' Shaqiri	Stadium: Arena da Amazônia; Attendance: 40'332; Referee: Néstor Pitana (Argentina)

1 July 2014	Argentina	1 – 0 (a.e.t.)	Switzerland	São Paulo, Brazil
18:00 CEST	Di María 118'	Report		Stadium: Arena de São Paulo; Attendance: 63'255; Referee: Jonas Eriksson (Sweden)

=== Friendly matches ===
14 August 2013	Switzerland	1 – 0	Brazil	Basel, Switzerland
CEST	Alves 48' (o.g.)	Report		Stadium: St. Jakob-Park; Attendance: 31'100; Referee: Deniz Aytekin (Germany)

15 November 2013	South Korea	2 – 1	Switzerland	Seoul, South Korea
CEST	Hong Jeong-ho 59'; Lee Chung-yong 87'		7' Kasami	Stadium: Seoul World Cup Stadium; Attendance: 36'813; Referee: Diego Abal (Argentina)

5 March 2014	Switzerland	2 – 2	Croatia	St. Gallen, Switzerland
20:30 CET	Drmić 34', 41'	Report	40', 54' Olić	Stadium: AFG Arena; Attendance: 17'200; Referee: Hugo Miguel (Portugal)

30 May 2014	Switzerland	1 – 0	Jamaica	Lucerne, Switzerland
20:30 CET	Drmić 84'	Report		Stadium: Swissporarena; Attendance: 15'000; Referee: Neil Doyle (Ireland)

3 June 2014	Switzerland	2 – 0	Peru	Lucerne, Switzerland
20:30 CET	Lichtsteiner 77'; Shaqiri 83'	Report		Stadium: Swissporarena; Attendance: 15'000; Referee: Daniel Stefański (Poland)

=== Non-official matches ===
Game duration 45 min

31 May 2014	Switzerland	2 – 0	(Switzerland) FC Tuggen	Weggis, Switzerland
11:10 CEST	Inler 31' (pen.); Stocker 45'	Report		Stadium: Thermoplan-Arena; Attendance: 1'500

== Women's national team ==
The home team is on the left column; the away team is on the right column.

Win Draw Loss

=== World Cup 2015 qualifying ===
21 September 2013	Switzerland	9–0	Serbia	Nyon, Switzerland
19:30 CET	Bachmann 13', 83'; Crnogorčević 21', 61', 81', 87'; Dickemann 36' (pen.); Wälti 38'; Bürki 75'			Stadium: Centre sportif de Colovray; Attendance: 915; Referee: Morag Pirie (Scotland

26 September 2013	Iceland	0–2	Switzerland	Reykjavík, Iceland
20:30 CET			9' Bachmann; 54' (pen.) Dickenmann	Stadium: Laugardalsvöllur; Attendance: 2'050; Referee: Christine Baitinger (Germany)

31 October 2013	Denmark	0–1	Switzerland	Vejle, Denmark
18:00 CET			26' Bachmann	Stadium: Vejle Stadion; Attendance: 1'921; Referee: Pernilla Larsson (Sweden)

12 February 2014	Israel	0–5	Switzerland	Petah Tikva, Israel
16:00 CET			6', 28', 36' F. Humm; 45' (pen.) L. Dickemann; A. Crnogorčević	Stadium: HaMoshava Stadium; Attendance: 100; Referee: Teodora Albon (Romania)

5 April 2014	Switzerland	11–0	Malta	Zug, Switzerland
16:00 CET	R. Bachmann 4'; L. Dickenmann 13', 45+4', 90+3'; M. Moser 17', 62'; N. Remund 31'; C. Abbé 39'; R. Kiwic 41'; F. Humm 59', 85'	Report		Stadium: Herti Allmend Stadion; Attendance: 1'040; Referee: Vesna Budimir (Croatia)

10 April 2014	Switzerland	1–1	Denmark	Aarau, Switzerland
19:00 CET	L. Dickemann 64' (pen.)	Report	51' (pen.) L. Røddik	Stadium: Stadion Brügglifeld; Attendance: 1'902; Referee: Cristina Dorcioman (Romania)

8 May 2014	Switzerland	3–0	Iceland	Nyon, Switzerland
19:00 CET	V. Bernauer 33'; V. Bürki 69'; L. Dickemann 79'			Stadium: Centre sportif de Colovray; Attendance: 1'350; Referee: Kateryna Monzul (Ukraine)

14 June 2014	Switzerland	9–0	Israel	Wohlen AG, Switzerland
16:00 CET	F. Humm 29'; R. Kiwic 32'; R. Bachmann 34', 39'; M. Moser 37'; V. Bürki 59', 85', 87'; C. Abbé 90+1'			Stadium: Stadion Niedermatten; Attendance: 950; Referee: Kulcsár Katalin (Hungary)

19 June 2014	Serbia	0–7	Switzerland	Inđija, Serbia
19:00 CET		Report	5' R. Bachmann; 21', 51' L. Dickenmann; 48' M. Moser; 60' A. Crnogorčević; 76' F. Humm; 81' N. Maritz	Stadium: Inđija Stadium; Attendance: 250; Referee: Eleni Lampadariou (Greece)

=== Friendly matches ===
14 January 2014	Portugal	1–2	Switzerland	Funchal, Portugal
19:30 CET	A. Borges 36'	Report	9' C. Pulver; 53' A. Crnogorčević	Stadium: Estádio dos Barreiros; Attendance: 100; Referee: Marlene Vieira (Portugal)

16 January 2014	Portugal	1–2	Switzerland	Machico, Portugal
12:00 CET	C. Mendes 16'	Report	15' A. Crnogorčević; 43' S. Susuri	Stadium: Estádio Municipal de Machico; Referee: Ana Amorim (Portugal)

=== 2014 Cyprus Cup ===
5 March 2014	Switzerland	1–1	South Korea	Paralimni, Cyprus
16:30 CET	L. Dickenmann 6'	Report	48' Ji So-Yun	Stadium: Tasos Makrou Stadium; Referee: Nina Lehtovaara (Finland)

7 March 2014	Switzerland	2–1	New Zealand	Paralimni, Cyprus
16:30 CET	E. Aigbogun 65', 67'	Report	3' H. Wilkinson	Stadium: Tasos Makrou Stadium

10 March 2014	Switzerland	1–2	Republic of Ireland	Paralimni, Cyprus
13:30 CET	L. Dickenmann 76' (pen.)	Report	48' D. O’Sullivan; 90' S. Roche	Stadium: Tasos Makrou Stadium

12 March 2014	Netherlands	4–1	Switzerland	Larnaca, Cyprus
11:30 CET	V. Miedema 1'; L. Martens 17', 50'; M. Heuver 90'	Report	3' A. Crnogorčević	Stadium: GSZ Stadium; Referee: Frida Nielsen (Denmark)

== Domestic season ==
=== Super League ===
Pos	Team	Pld	W	D	L	GF	GA	GD	Pts	Qualification or relegation
1	Basel (C)	36	19	15	2	70	34	+36	72	Qualification for the Champions League group stage
2	Grasshopper	36	19	8	9	67	43	+24	65	Qualification for the Champions League third qualifying round
3	Young Boys	36	17	8	11	59	50	+9	59	Qualification for the Europa League third qualifying round
4	Luzern	36	15	6	15	48	54	−6	51	Qualification for the Europa League second qualifying round
5	Zürich	36	14	8	14	51	52	−1	50	Qualification for the Europa League play-off round (Note: Zürich won the 2013–14 Swiss Cup, so therefore qualified for the Play-off round of the 2014–15 UEFA Europa League.)
6	Thun	36	13	9	14	57	53	+4	48	
7	St. Gallen	36	11	12	13	37	47	−10	45	
8	Sion	36	12	7	17	38	45	−7	43	
9	Aarau	36	12	6	18	55	71	−16	42	
10	Lausanne-Sport (R)	36	7	3	26	38	71	−33	24	Relegation to Swiss Challenge League

Source: Swiss Super League (in German)
Rules for classification: 1) points; 2) goal difference; 3) number of goals scored.
(C) Champions; (R) Relegated

=== Challenge League ===
Pos	Team	Pld	W	D	L	GF	GA	GD	Pts	Promotion or relegation
1	Vaduz (C, P)	36	21	10	5	71	34	+37	73	Qualification for the Europa League first qualifying round and promotion to 2014–15 Swiss Super League
2	Lugano	36	19	7	10	55	46	+9	64	
3	Wil	36	18	9	9	74	45	+29	63	
4	Schaffhausen	36	18	8	10	57	40	+17	62	
5	Servette	36	18	7	11	49	48	+1	61	
6	Winterthur	36	11	9	16	45	50	−5	42	
7	Biel-Bienne	36	9	10	17	56	68	−12	37	
8	Chiasso	36	7	12	17	35	52	−17	33	
9	Wohlen	36	7	11	18	47	67	−20	32	
10	Locarno (R)	36	5	11	20	31	70	−39	26	Relegation to 2014–15 1. Liga Promotion

Source: Swiss Challenge League (in German)
Rules for classification: 1) points; 2) goal difference; 3) number of goals scored.
(C) Champions; (P) Promoted; (R) Relegated

=== 1. Liga Promotion ===
In April 2013 the club AC Bellinzona was declared bankrupt and was withdrawn from the division. Therefore, there was no relegated team from the 2012–13 Swiss Challenge League and so this season's 1. Liga Promotion competition was competed with just 15 teams.

Pos	Team	Pld	W	D	L	GF	GA	GD	Pts	Qualification or relegation
1	FC Le Mont	28	16	5	7	49	36	+13	53	Promotion to Challenge League
2	SC Young Fellows Juventus	28	15	4	9	54	33	+21	49	
3	Étoile Carouge FC	28	15	4	9	71	54	+17	49	
4	FC Köniz	28	13	10	5	48	31	+17	49	
5	FC Tuggen	28	14	4	10	63	52	+11	46	
6	SR Delémont	28	12	5	11	40	43	−3	41	
7	Zürich U-21	28	11	7	10	38	39	−1	40	
8	Basel U-21	28	10	7	11	38	41	−3	37	
9	Sion U-21	28	11	4	13	45	52	−7	37	
10	SC Brühl	28	10	6	12	35	45	−10	36	
11	FC Stade Nyonnais	28	10	5	13	36	48	−12	35	
12	FC Breitenrain Bern	28	9	7	12	41	40	+1	34	
13	Old Boys	28	9	3	16	50	55	−5	30	
14	St. Gallen U-21	28	5	10	13	28	43	−15	25	
15	SC Kriens	28	6	7	15	38	62	−24	25	Relegation to 1. Liga (4th tier)
16	AC Bellinzona	0	0	0	0	0	0	0	0	Relegation to 2. Liga (6th tier)

Source: RSSSF
Rules for classification: 1) points; 2) goal difference; 3) number of goals scored; 4) head-to-head points; 5) draw

=== Swiss Cup ===
FC Zürich beat FC Thun 5–4 in the penalty shoot-out following a goalless draw in the first semi-final and FC Basel beat FC Luzern 1–0 in the second semi-final. The two winners played against each other in the final, which was held on 21 April 2014 in the Stade de Suisse in Bern.

21 April 2014
14:00

Zürich	2–0 (a.e.t.)	Basel
Chikhaoui (yellow card) 61'; Buff (yellow card) 83'; Kecojević (yellow card) 95'; Gavranović 110' (1:0); Gavranović 114' (2:0)	SFV summary	(yellow card) 62' Elneny; (red card) 66' Sauro; (yellow card) 77' (yellow-red card) 99' Sio; (yellow card) 102' Serey Die

Stade de Suisse, Bern
Attendance: 23'312
Referee: (Switzerland) Patrick GrafRefereesfifa

GK	(Switzerland) David Da Costa
DF	(Portugal) Jorge Teixeira
DF	(Montenegro) Ivan Kecojević	(yellow card) 95'
DF	(Switzerland) Berat Djimsiti
MF	(Switzerland) Oliver Buff	(yellow card) 83'	(substituted off) 86'
MF	(Switzerland) Philippe Koch (cap)
MF	(Switzerland) Davide Chiumiento
MF	(Tunisia) Yassine Chikhaoui	(yellow card) 61'
MF	(Israel) Avi Rikan		(substituted off) 111'
ST	(Switzerland) Mario Gavranović
ST	(Cameroon) Franck Etoundi		(substituted off) 91'
Substitutes:
DF	(Switzerland) Davide Mariani		(substituted on) 86'
MF	(Albania) Armando Sadiku		(substituted on) 91'
FW	(Montenegro) Asmir Kajević		(substituted on) 111'
Manager:
(Switzerland) Urs Meier

GK	(Switzerland) Yann Sommer
DF	(Switzerland) Naser Aliji
DF	(Czech Republic) Marek Suchý
DF	(Argentina) Gastón Sauro	(red card) 66'
DF	(Sweden) Behrang Safari
MF	(Ivory Coast) Serey Die	(yellow card) 102'
MF	(Egypt) Mohamed Elneny	(yellow card) 62'
MF	(Switzerland) Davide Callà		(substituted off) 70'
MF	(Switzerland) Fabian Frei		(substituted off) 60'
MF	(Switzerland) Valentin Stocker (cap)		(substituted off) 106'
ST	(Ivory Coast) Giovanni Sio	(yellow card) 77' (yellow-red card) 99'
Substitutes:
MF	(Argentina) Matías Delgado		(substituted on) 60'
MF	(Switzerland) Arlind Ajeti		(substituted on) 70'
MF	(Chile) Marcelo Díaz		(substituted on) 106'
Manager:
(Switzerland) Murat Yakin

== Swiss Clubs in Europe ==
- Basel: Champions League third qualifying round
- Grasshopper Club: Champions League third qualifying round
- St. Gallen: Europa League play-off round
- Zürich: Europa League third qualifying round
- Thun: Europa League second qualifying round
- Vaduz: Europa League first qualifying round

=== Basel ===
==== Champions League ====
Third qualifying round

30 July 2013 1st Leg	Basel (Switzerland)	1–0	(Israel) Maccabi Tel Aviv	St. Jakob-Park, Basel
19:00	Schär (yellow card) 38'; Stocker 39' (1:0); Safari (yellow card) 76'; Ajeti (yellow card) 90+4'	FCB summary UEFA Report	(yellow card) 8' Yeini; (yellow card) 38' Itzhaki; (yellow card) 43' Tibi; (yellow card) 90' Alberman; (yellow card) 90+2' Ben Harush	Attendance: 12,353; Referee: Szymon Marciniak (Poland)

6 August 2013 2nd Leg	Maccabi Tel Aviv (Israel)	3–3 (3–4 agg.)	(Switzerland) Basel	Bloomfield Stadium, Tel Aviv
19:00	Carlos García (yellow card) 5'; Prica (yellow card) 13'; Schär 34' (o.g. 1:3); Zahavi 37' (2:3); Radi 55' (3:3); Yitzhaki (yellow card) 68'; Alberman (yellow card) 90'	FCB summary UEFA report	5' (pen. 0:1) Schär; 21' (0:2) Salah; 32' (0:3) Díaz; (yellow card) 40' Stocker; (yellow card) 41' Xhaka; (yellow card) 75' Salah	Attendance: 14,000; Referee: Clément Turpin (France)

Basel won 4–3 on aggregate.

Play-off round

21 August 2013 1st Leg	Ludogorets Razgrad (Bulgaria)	2–4	(Switzerland) Basel	Vasil Levski National Stadium, Sofia
20:45	Marcelinho 23' (1:1); Júnior Caiçara (yellow card) 34' (yellow-red card) 83'; Stoyanov 50' (2:1)	FCB summary UEFA Report	12' (0:1) Salah; (yellow card) 26' Sio; 59' (2:2) Salah; 64' (2:3) Sio; (yellow card) 69' Safari; (yellow card) 81' Voser; 84' (pen. 2:4) Schär	Attendance: 9,000; Referee: Wolfgang Stark (Germany)

27 August 2013 2nd Leg	Basel (Switzerland)	2–0 (6–2 agg.)	(Bulgaria) Ludogorets Razgrad	St. Jakob-Park, Basel
20:45	Frei 11' (1:0); Schär (yellow card) 24'; Salah (yellow card) 39'; Ajeti (yellow card) 44'; Degen 79' (2:0)	FCB summary UEFA Report	(yellow card) 63' Moti	Attendance: 15,733; Referee: William Collum (Scotland)

Group stage

18 September 2013 1	Chelsea (England)	1–2	(Switzerland) Basel	London
20:45	van Ginkel (yellow card) 43'; Oscar 45' (1:0)	FCB summary UEFA Report	(yellow card) 64' Díaz; 71' (1:1) Salah; 82' (1:2) Streller	Stadium: Stamford Bridge; Attendance: 40,358; Referee: Daniele Orsato (Italy); Man of the Match: Mohamed Salah

1 October 2013 2	Basel (Switzerland)	0–1	(Germany) Schalke 04	Basel
20:45	Delgado (yellow card) 89'	FCB summary UEFA Report	(yellow card) 37' Aogo; (yellow card) 38' Farfán; 54' (0:1) Draxler; (yellow card) 65' Höger	Stadium: St. Jakob-Park; Attendance: 33,251; Referee: Alberto Undiano Mallenco (Spain); Man of the Match: Julian Draxler

22 October 2013 3	Steaua București (Romania)	1–1	(Switzerland) Basel	Bucharest
20:45	Georgievski (yellow card) 65'; Szukała (yellow card) 79'; Tatu 88' (1:1)	FCB summary UEFA Report	(yellow card) 19' Schär; (yellow card) 22' Voser; 48' (0:1) Díaz	Stadium: Arena Națională; Attendance: 23,899; Referee: Matej Jug (Slovenia); Man of the Match: Marcelo Díaz

6 November 2013 4	Basel (Switzerland)	1–1	(Romania) Steaua București	Basel
20:45	Ivanov (yellow card) 42'; Schär (yellow card) 80'; D. Degen (yellow card) 86'; Sio 90+1' (1:1)	FCB summary UEFA Report	(yellow card) 11' Szukała; 17' (0:1) Piovaccari; (yellow card) 26' Piovaccari; (yellow card) 41' Bourceanu	Stadium: St. Jakob-Park; Attendance: 30,704; Referee: Olegário Benquerença (Portugal); Man of the Match: Alexandru Bourceanu

26 November 2013 5	Basel (Switzerland)	1–0	(England) Chelsea	Basel
20:45	Xhaka (yellow card) 37'; Serey Die (yellow card) 63'; Salah 87' (1:0)	FCB summary UEFA Report	(yellow card) 65' Mikel; (yellow card) 76' Ramires	Stadium: St. Jakob-Park; Attendance: 35,208; Referee: (France) Stephane Lannoy

11 December 2013 6	Schalke 04 (Germany)	2–0	(Switzerland) Basel	Gelsenkirchen
20:45	Höwedes (yellow card) 29'; Draxler 51' (1:0); Matip (yellow card) 62'; Matip 57' (2:0); Kolašinac (yellow card) 78'	FCB summary UEFA Report	(yellow card) 20' Voser; (red card) 31' Ivanov; (yellow card) 57' F. Frei; (yellow card) 58' Schär; (yellow card) 85' Sio	Stadium: Veltins-Arena; Attendance: 52,093; Referee: Paolo Tagliavento (Italy)

Final group table

Pos	Team	Pld	W	D	L	GF	GA	GD	Pts	Qualification
1	(England) Chelsea	6	4	0	2	12	3	+9	12	Advance to knockout phase
2	(Germany) Schalke 04	6	3	1	2	6	6	0	10	Advance to knockout phase
3	(Switzerland) Basel	6	2	2	2	5	6	−1	8	Transfer to Europa League
4	(Romania) Steaua București	6	0	3	3	2	10	−8	3	

Source: www.fcb-archiv.ch

==== Europa League ====
Knockout phase

Round of 32

20 February 2014 First leg	Maccabi Tel Aviv (Israel)	0–0	(Switzerland) Basel	Bloomfield Stadium, Tel Aviv
21:05	Garcia (yellow card) 20'; Micha (yellow card) 67'; Einbinder (yellow card) 90+1'	FCB summary UEFA report	(yellow card) 16' Sauro; (yellow card) 65' Ajeti	Attendance: 13,519; Referee: David Fernández Borbalán

27 February 2014 Second leg	Basel (Switzerland)	3–0 (3–0 agg.)	(Israel) Maccabi Tel Aviv	St. Jakob-Park, Basel
19:00	Stocker 17' (1:0); Serey Die (yellow card) 19'; Streller 60' (2:0); Streller 71' (3:0)	FCB summary UEFA report		Attendance: 15,212; Referee: Ivan Bebek (Croatia)

Basel won 3–0 on aggregate.

Round of 16

13 March 2014 First leg	Basel (Switzerland)	0–0	(Austria) Red Bull Salzburg	St. Jakob-Park, Basel
19:00	Serey Die (yellow card) 14'; Sio (yellow card) 23'; P. Degen (yellow card) 84'	FCB summary UEFA report	(yellow card) 14' Hinteregger; (yellow card) 20' Mané; (yellow card) 70' Klein	Attendance: 17,027; Referee: Ovidiu Hațegan (Romania)

20 March 2014 Second leg	Red Bull Salzburg (Austria)	1–2 (1–2 agg.)	(Switzerland) Basel	Stadion Salzburg, Wals-Siezenheim
21:05	Soriano 22' (1:0); Rodnei (yellow card) 62'; Ramalho (yellow card) 78'; Alan (yellow card) 54' (red card) 86'; Leitgeb (yellow card) 90+1'	FCB summary UEFA report	(red card) 9' Suchý; (yellow card) 9' Streller; (yellow card) 38' Sio; 50' (1:1) Streller; (yellow card) 54' Ar. Ajeti; 60' (1:2) Sauro; (yellow card) 88' P. Degen	Attendance: 29,320; Referee: Manuel Gräfe (Germany)

Basel won 2–1 on aggregate.

Quarter-finals

3 April 2014 First leg	Basel (Switzerland)	3–0	(Spain) Valencia	St. Jakob-Park, Basel
21:05	Serey Die (yellow card) 13'; Delgado 34'; Delgado 38'; Embolo (yellow card) 76'; Stocker 90+1'	FCB summary UEFA report	(yellow card) 19' Senderos	Attendance: 350; Referee: Martin Atkinson (England)

10 April 2014 Second leg	Valencia (Spain)	5–0 (a.e.t.) (5–3 agg.)	(Switzerland) Basel	Mestalla, Valencia
21:05	Feghouli (yellow card) 27'; Alcácer 38'; Vargas 42'; Alcácer 70'; Keita (yellow card) 98'; Vargas (yellow card) 104'; Alcácer 113'; Alcácer (yellow card) 114'; Bernat (yellow card) 115'; Guaita (yellow card) 117'; Bernat 118'	FCB summary UEFA report	(yellow card) 24' Safari; (yellow card) 61' Elneny; (yellow card) 65' Schär; (yellow card) 74' (yellow-red card) 100' Díaz; (yellow card) 104' (yellow-red card) 105' Gastón Sauro; (yellow card) 106' Xhaka	Attendance: 33,152; Referee: Viktor Kassai (Hungary)

Valencia won 5–3 on aggregate.

Notes

1. The Basel v Valencia match was played behind closed doors due to punishment by UEFA.

=== Grasshopper Club ===
==== Champions League ====
Third qualifying round

30 July 2013 First Leg	Olympique Lyonnais (France)	1 – 0	(Switzerland) Grasshopper Club Zürich	Lyon, France
21:00	Gonalons (yellow card) 40'; Biševac 64'	UEFA report	(yellow card) 58' Vilotić; (yellow card) 90+3' Abrashi	Stadium: Stade de Gerland; Attendance: 27'331; Referee: Hüseyin Göçek (Turkey)

6 August 2013 Second Leg	Grasshopper Club Zürich (Switzerland)	0 - 1 (0 - 2 agg.)	(France) Olympique Lyonnais	Zürich, Switzerland
21:00	Hajrović (yellow card) 18'; Nzuzi (yellow card) 21'; Vilotić (yellow card) 57'; Pavlović (yellow card) 69'	UEFA report	(yellow card) 13' Miguel Lopes; (yellow card) 31' (goal) 82' Grenier	Stadium: Letzigrund; Attendance: 9'500; Referee: Antonio Mateu Lahoz (Spain)

==== Europa League ====
Play-off round

22 August 2013 First Leg	Grasshopper Club Zürich (Switzerland)	1 – 2	(Italy) Fiorentina	Zürich, Switzerland
21:00	Gashi (yellow card) 57'; Anatole 64'	UEFA report	13' Cuadrado; 46' (o.g.) Grichting; (yellow card) 87' Neto; (yellow card) 90+5' Ambrosini	Stadium: Letzigrund; Attendance: 15'033; Referee: Matej Jug (Slovenia)

29 August 2013 Second Leg	Fiorentina (Italy)	0 – 1 (2 – 2 agg.)	(Switzerland) Grasshopper Club Zürich	Florence, Italy
21:00	Pasqual (yellow card) 59'; Neto (yellow card) 69'; Aquilani (yellow card) 87'; Iličić (yellow card) 90+3'	UEFA report	(yellow card) 12' Pavlović; (yellow card) 45' Abrashi; 41' Ben Khalifa; (yellow card) 59' Salatić; (yellow card) 90' Toko	Stadium: Stadio Artemio Franchi; Attendance: 22'227; Referee: Ivan Bebek (Croatia)

2–2 on aggregate. Fiorentina won on away goals

=== St. Gallen ===
==== Europa League ====
Play-off round

22 August 2013 First Leg	St. Gallen (Switzerland)	1–1	(Russia) Spartak Moscow	AFG Arena, St. Gallen
19:00	Mathys 47'	Report	Movsisyan 37'	Attendance: 18,000; Referee: Ovidiu Hațegan (Romania)

29 August 2013 Second Leg	Spartak Moscow (Russia)	2–4 (3–5 agg.)	(Switzerland) St. Gallen	Arena Khimki, Khimki
17:00	Özbiliz 1'; Movsisyan 83'	Report	Karanović 17', 32'; Rodríguez 36'; Janjatović 88'	Attendance: 8,134; Referee: Danny Makkelie (Netherlands)

St. Gallen won 5–3 on aggregate.

Group stage

Matches

19 September 2013 Matchday 1	St. Gallen (Switzerland)	2–0	(Russia) Kuban Krasnodar	AFG Arena, St. Gallen
19:00	Karanović 56'; Mathys 76'	Report		Attendance: 12,551; Referee: Paweł Gil (Poland)

3 October 2013 Matchday 2	Swansea City (England)	1–0	(Switzerland) St. Gallen	Liberty Stadium, Swansea
21:05	Routledge 52'	Report		Attendance: 15,397; Referee: Duarte Gomes (Portugal)

24 October 2013 Matchday 3	Valencia (Spain)	5–1	(Switzerland) St. Gallen	Mestalla, Valencia
21:05	Alcácer 12'; Cartabia 21', 30'; Costa 33'; Canales 71'	Report	Nater 74'	Attendance: 26,645; Referee: Pol van Boekel (Netherlands)

7 November 2013 Matchday 4	St. Gallen (Switzerland)	2–3	(Spain) Valencia	AFG Arena, St. Gallen
19:00	Besle 37'; Karanović 66'	Report	Piatti 30', 76'; Canales 86'	Attendance: 16,951; Referee: Aleksei Kulbakov (Belarus)

28 November 2013 Matchday 5	Kuban Krasnodar (Russia)	4–0	(Switzerland) St. Gallen	Kuban Stadium, Krasnodar
18:00	Melgarejo 3', 71'; Ignatyev 54'; Kaboré 90'	Report		Attendance: 19,032; Referee: Anastassios Kakos (Greece)

12 December 2013 Matchday 6	St. Gallen (Switzerland)	1–0	(England) Swansea City	AFG Arena, St. Gallen
19:00	Mathys 80'	Report		Attendance: 15,298; Referee: Liran Liany (Israel)

Final group table

Pos	Team	Pld	W	D	L	GF	GA	GD	Pts	Qualification
1	(Spain) Valencia	6	4	1	1	12	7	+5	13	Advance to knockout phase
2	(England) Swansea City	6	2	2	2	6	4	+2	8	Advance to knockout phase
3	(Russia) Kuban Krasnodar	6	1	3	2	7	7	0	6	
4	(Switzerland) St. Gallen	6	2	0	4	6	13	−7	6	

Source: Soccerway

=== Zürich ===
==== Europa League ====
Third qualifying round

1 August 2013 First leg	Slovan Liberec (Czech Republic)	2–1	(Switzerland) Zürich	Stadion u Nisy, Liberec
20:15	Rabušic 66', 81'	Report	Chiumiento 5' (pen.)	Attendance: 7,780; Referee: Liran Liany (Israel)

8 August 2013 Second leg	Zürich (Switzerland)	1–2 (2–4 agg.)	(Czech Republic) Slovan Liberec	Letzigrund, Zürich
19:30	Chermiti 17'	Report	Frýdek 64'; Rybalka 85'	Attendance: 5,915; Referee: Martin Strömbergsson (Sweden)

Slovan Liberec won 4–2 on aggregate.

=== Thun ===
==== Europa League ====
Second qualifying round

18 July 2013 First leg	Thun (Switzerland)	2–0	(Georgia (country)) Chikhura Sachkhere	Arena Thun, Thun
19:30	Sanogo 12'; Schirinzi 38'	Report		Attendance: 3,114; Referee: Ivaylo Stoyanov (Bulgaria)

25 July 2013 Second leg	Chikhura Sachkhere (Georgia (country))	1–3 (1–5 agg.)	(Switzerland) Thun	Mikheil Meskhi Stadium, Tbilisi
18:00	Rekhviashvili 6'	Report	Lomashvili 45' (o.g.); Cássio 49'; M. Schneuwly 84'	Attendance: 1,400; Referee: Ante Vučemilović-Šimunović Jr. (Croatia)

Thun won 5–1 on aggregate.

Third qualifying round

1 August 2013 First leg	Häcken (Sweden)	1–2	(Switzerland) Thun	Gamla Ullevi, Gothenburg
19:00	Ericsson 64'	Report	Zuffi 33', 63'	Attendance: 2,802; Referee: Mattias Gestranius (Finland)

8 August 2013 Second leg	Thun (Switzerland)	1–0 (3–1 agg.)	(Sweden) Häcken	Arena Thun, Thun
19:30	Sanogo Junior 69'	Report		Attendance: 5,027; Referee: Arnold Hunter (Northern Ireland)

Thun won 3–1 on aggregate.

Play-off round

22 August 2013 First leg	Partizan (Serbia)	1–0	(Switzerland) Thun	Partizan Stadium, Belgrade
20:30	Jojić 70'	Report		Attendance: 15,000; Referee: Serhiy Boyko (Ukraine)

29 August 2013 Second leg	Thun (Switzerland)	3–0 (3–1 agg.)	(Serbia) Partizan	Arena Thun, Thun
20:00	C. Schneuwly 15'; M. Schneuwly 48'; Zuffi 75'	Report		Attendance: 8,150; Referee: Daniele Orsato (Italy)

Thun won 3–1 on aggregate.

Group stage

19 September 2013 Matchday 1	Thun (Switzerland)	1–0	(Austria) Rapid Wien	Arena Thun, Thun
21:05	C. Schneuwly 35'	Report		Attendance: 7,022; Referee: Anastassios Kakos (Greece)

3 October 2013 Matchday 2	Genk (Belgium)	2–1	(Switzerland) Thun	Cristal Arena, Genk
19:00	Gorius 55'; Vossen 63'	Report	Martínez 90+3'	Attendance: 11,559; Referee: Bobby Madden (Scotland)

24 October 2013 Matchday 3	Dynamo Kyiv (Ukraine)	3–0	(Switzerland) Thun	Olympic Stadium, Kyiv
19:00	Yarmolenko 35'; Mbokani 60'; Husyev 78'	Report		Attendance: 26,042; Referee: Halis Özkahya (Turkey)

7 November 2013 Matchday 4	Thun (Switzerland)	0–2	(Ukraine) Dynamo Kyiv	Arena Thun, Thun
21:05		Report	Schenkel 29' (o.g.); Yarmolenko 69'	Attendance: 6,523; Referee: Clément Turpin (France)

28 November 2013 Matchday 5	Rapid Wien (Austria)	2–1	(Switzerland) Thun	Ernst-Happel-Stadion, Vienna
19:00	Boyd 17'; Bošković 64'	Report	Sadik 62'	Attendance: 34,300; Referee: Paweł Gil (Poland)

12 December 2013 Matchday 6	Thun (Switzerland)	0–1	(Belgium) Genk	Arena Thun, Thun
21:05		Report	Vossen 31'	Attendance: 5,185; Referee: Alexandru Tudor (Romania)

Notes

1. Rapid Wien played their home matches at Ernst-Happel-Stadion, Vienna instead of their regular stadium, Gerhard Hanappi Stadium, Vienna.

Final group table

Pos	Team	Pld	W	D	L	GF	GA	GD	Pts	Qualification
1	(Belgium) Genk	6	4	2	0	10	5	+5	14	Advance to knockout phase
2	(Ukraine) Dynamo Kyiv	6	3	1	2	11	7	+4	10	Advance to knockout phase
3	(Austria) Rapid Wien	6	1	3	2	8	10	−2	6	
4	(Switzerland) Thun	6	1	0	5	3	10	−7	3	

Source: Soccerway

=== Vaduz ===
==== Europa League ====
First qualifying round

4 July 2013 First leg	Chikhura Sachkhere (Georgia (country))	0–0	(Liechtenstein) Vaduz	Mikheil Meskhi Stadium, Tbilisi
16:00		Report		Attendance: 1,200; Referee: Alexandr Gauzer (Kazakhstan)

11 July 2013 Second leg	Vaduz (Liechtenstein)	1–1	(Georgia (country)) Chikhura Sachkhere	Rheinpark Stadion, Vaduz
19:00	Sutter 29'	Report	Jigauri 2'	Attendance: 1,124; Referee: Enea Jorgji (Albania)

1–1 on aggregate. Chikhura Sachkhere won on away goals.

== Sources ==
- Josef Zindel (2018). FC Basel 1893. Die ersten 125 Jahre (in German). Basel: Friedrich Reinhardt Verlag. ISBN 978-3-7245-2305-5.
- Switzerland 2013/14 at RSSSF

Preceded by 2012–13	Seasons in Swiss football	Succeeded by 2014–15
