= Valentin Gjokaj =

Albanian footballer (born 1993)

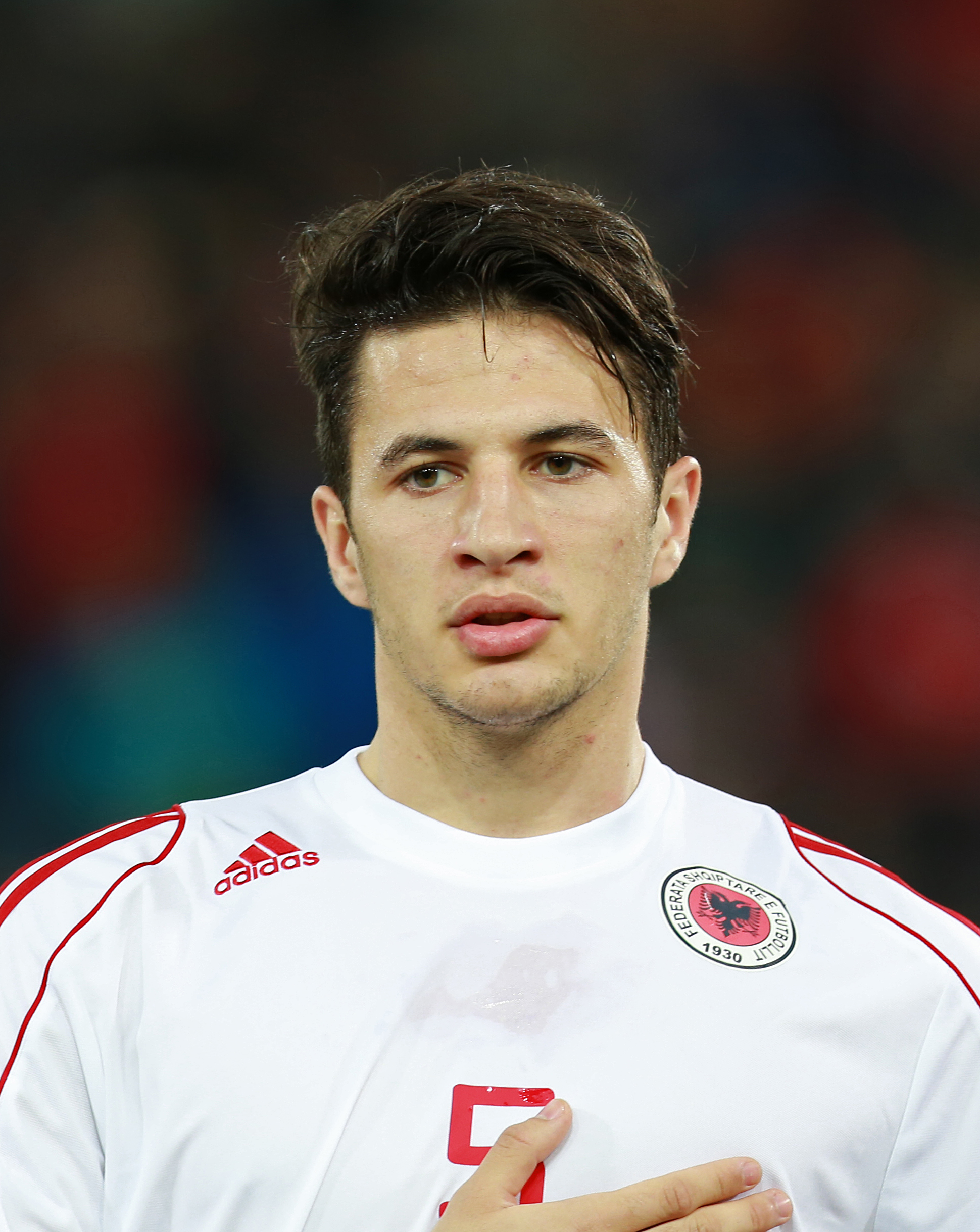
- Gjokaj with the Albania U21

Personal information
- Full name: Valentin Gasper Gjokaj
- Date of birth: 23 August 1993 (age 33)
- Place of birth: Lucerne, Switzerland
- Height: 6 ft 2 in (1.88 m)
- Position: Defender

Youth career
- –2011: FC Luzern

Senior career*
Years	Team	Apps	(Gls)
2011–2012	FC Luzern II	14	(4)
2012–2014	Derby County	6	(0)
2012	→ Carlisle United (loan)	0	(0)
2014	→ Barnet (loan)	14	(2)
2014–2015	Gateshead	19	(0)
2016	SSV Reutlingen 05	15	(1)
2021–2022	SC Buochs	21	(0)

International career^{‡}
2013	Albania U21	9	(0)
- * Club domestic league appearances and goals as of 23:00, 22 December 2022 (UTC) ‡ National team caps and goals as of 13:00, 11 September 2013 (UTC)

Valentin Gasper Gjokaj (born 23 August 1993) is a Swiss-Albanian professional footballer who plays as a defender.

== Club career ==
=== FC Luzern ===
Born in Lucerne, Gjokaj began his career at hometown Swiss club FC Luzern and played for the club's under-18 team before having trial at Premier League side Blackburn Rovers in August 2011, playing the full 90 minutes a in a reserve pre-season friendly against Chorley, which Rovers won 2–1. After this trial Gjokaj returned to Luzern and featured 14 times for the second team in the 1.Liga Group 3 during the 2011–12 season, scoring 4 goals after he made his début in March 2012 against GC Biaschesi. In May 2012, Gjokaj had a trial at Premier League club Newcastle United. However he failed to get a deal and Gjokaj was released by Luzern at the end of the season.

=== Derby County ===
In July 2012, ahead of the 2012–13 season, Gjokaj went on trial at Championship side Derby County, featuring in a pre-season friendly against Mansfield Town on 25 July 2012. Gjokaj impressed in this game and was given further run outs against Burton Albion and Northampton Town. Gjokaj returned to his home in Switzerland, but Derby manager Nigel Clough was keen to sign him. Gjokaj signed a two-year contract with the club, with an option of a third year on 18 August 2012.

Gjokaj made his competitive first team début in a 2–2 draw against Sheffield Wednesday on 18 August 2012, as an 87th minute substitute for Will Hughes. Gjokaj spent the following three months as a regular for Derby's under-21 side, before he joined League One outfit Carlisle United on loan for six weeks on 22 November. However he was recalled after a month, after making only one appearance as a second-half substitute in an FA Cup match against Bournemouth on 1 December. Upon his return at Derby, Gjokaj was again mainly featuring for the club's under-21 team and as an unused substitute for the first before, before making his first start at right back in Derby's 1–1 draw at Cardiff City on 5 March 2013.

During the 2013–14 pre-season, Gjokaj took part in Derby's first team friendlies. As confirmed by Nigel Clough, the player was going to be used as cover in central defence for Jake Buxton and Richard Keogh as more senior options Shaun Barker and Mark O'Brien were both recovering from knee injuries.

Gjokaj joined Barnet on loan on 14 February 2014. On 18 March 2014, Gjokaj extended his loan stay with the Bees until the end of the 2013–14 season. His first goal for them came in a 2–1 win over Forest Green Rovers on 5 April 2014. He scored the only goal in a 1–0 win at Nuneaton Town on 19 April, scoring from outside the box. In total, he scored twice in his 14 appearances for the Bees.

=== Gateshead ===
Following his release from Derby County, Gjokaj signed for Gateshead on 18 November 2014. He made his debut on 22 November in a 2–2 draw at Torquay United, being sent off during second half injury time. Gjokaj's only goal for Gateshead came on 7 February 2015 in an FA Trophy tie against Wrexham. Gjokaj was sent off for a second time while at Gateshead on 4 April against Grimsby Town before being released at the end of the season.

=== SSV Reutlingen 05 ===
In February 2016, Gjokaj signed for SSV Reutlingen 05. He made his debut on 13 February in a 0–2 defeat to SGV Freiberg.

== International career ==
Gjokaj was eligible for both Switzerland and Albania at international level and in January 2013, Gjokaj was called up for the Albania under-21 for their friendly against Macedonia under-21 on 6 February. Gjokaj played the full 90 minutes of the game, which ended 0–0.

On 4 June 2013, Gjokaj received the Albanian citizenship among Albania senior side Agon Mehmeti and fellow Albania U21 players Haxhi Neziraj, Amir Rrahmani & Herolind Shala.

== Career statistics ==
Appearances and goals by club, season and competition
Club	Season	League			National cup		League cup		Other (Note: Football League Trophy, FA Community Shield, FA Trophy and play-off)		Total	
Club	Season	Division	Apps	Goals	Apps	Goals	Apps	Goals	Apps	Goals	Apps	Goals
FC Luzern II	2011–12	1.Liga Group 3	14	4	—		—		—		14	4
Derby County	2012–13	Championship	6	0	—		—		—		6	0
Derby County	2013–14	Championship	0	0	0	0	0	0	0	0	0	0
Derby County	Total		6	0	0	0	0	0	0	0	6	0
Carlisle United (loan)	2012–13	League One	0	0	1	0	—		—		1	0
Barnet (loan)	2013–14	Conference Premier	14	2	0	0	—		—		14	2
Gateshead	2014–15	Conference	19	0	1	0	—		4	1	24	1
SSV Reutlingen 05	2015–16	Oberliga Baden-Württemberg	15	1	0	0	0	0	0	0	15	1
Career total			68	7	2	0	0	0	4	1	74	8
