= 2012–13 in Swiss football =

Football in Switzerland
- Season: 2012–13

Men's football
- Super League: Basel
- Challenge League: Aarau
- 1. Liga Promotion: FC Schaffhausen
- Swiss Cup: Grasshopper Club Zürich

The following is a summary of the 2012–13 season of competitive football in Switzerland.

== Men's national team ==
The home team is on the left column; the away team is on the right column.

Win Draw Loss

=== 2014 World Cup qualification ===
7 September 2012	Slovenia	0 – 2	Switzerland	Ljubljana, Slovenia
20:30 CEST		report	20' G. Xhaka; 51' Inler; (yellow card) 76' (red card) Barnetta	Stadium: Stožice Stadium; Attendance: 14'000; Referee: Paolo Tagliavento (Italy)

11 September 2012	Switzerland	2 – 0	Albania	Lucerne, Switzerland
20:30 CEST	Shaqiri 23'; Inler 68' (pen.)	report		Stadium: swissporarena Attendance: 15'600; Referee: Ovidiu Alin Hategan (Romania)

12 October 2012	Switzerland	1 – 1	Norway	Bern, Switzerland
20:30 CEST	Gavranović 79'	report	81' Hangeland	Stadium: Stade de Suisse; Attendance: 30'712; Referee: David Fernández Borbalán (Spain)

16 October 2012	Iceland	0 – 2	Switzerland	Reykjavík, Iceland
18:30 GMT		report	65' Barnetta; 79' Gavranović	Stadium: Laugardalsvöllur; Attendance: 8'369; Referee: Alan Kelly (Ireland)

23 March 2013	Cyprus	0 - 0	Switzerland	Nicosia, Cyprus
18:30	Solomou (yellow card) 7'; Theophilou (yellow card) 80'	Summary	Seferovic (yellow card) 34' von Bergen (yellow card) 46'; Senderos (yellow card) 89'	Stadium: GSP Stadium; Attendance: 3,572; Referee: (Germany) Manuel Gräfe

8 June 2013	Switzerland	1 - 0	Cyprus	Lancy, Switzerland
17:30 CEST	Inler (yellow card) 45'; Djourou (yellow card) 86'; Seferovic 90'	Summary	Charalambous (yellow card) 13'; Sotiriou (yellow card) 20'; Makrides (yellow card) 33'; Charalambous (yellow card) 67'	Stadium: Stade de Genève; Attendance: 16,900; Referee: (Italy) Paolo Mazzoleni

=== Friendly matches ===
29 February 2012	Switzerland	1 – 3	Argentina	Basel, Switzerland
20:30 CEST	Shaqiri 50'	report	20', 88', 92' (pen.) Messi	Stadium: St. Jakob-Park; Attendance: 30,250; Referee: Florian Meyer (Germany)

26 May 2012	Switzerland	5 – 3	Germany	Basel, Switzerland
18:00 CEST	Derdiyok 21', 23', 50'; Lichtsteiner 67'; Mehmedi 77'	report	45' Hummels; 64' Schürrle; 72' Reus	Stadium: St. Jakob-Park; Attendance: 27,381; Referee: Antony Gautier (France)

30 May 2012	Switzerland	0 – 1	Romania	Lucerne, Switzerland
20:15 CEST		report	57' Grozav	Stadium: swissporarena Attendance: 11,850; Referee: Svein Oddvar Moen (Norway)

15 August 2012	Croatia	2 – 4	Switzerland	Split, Croatia
20:15 CEST	Eduardo 20', 65'	report	11' Xhaka; 11' Barnetta; 52', 81' Gavranović	Stadium: Stadion Poljud; Attendance: 10,000; Referee: Antonio Damato (Italy)

14 November 2012	Tunisia	1 – 2	Switzerland	Sousse, Tunisia
18:15 CET	Dhaouadi 59'; Bédoui (yellow card) 74' (red card)	report	40' Derdiyok; 90+6' Shaqiri	Stadium: Stade Olympique; Attendance: 1,500; Referee: Cecil Amatey Fleisher (Ghana)

6 February 2013	Greece	0 - 0	Switzerland	Piraeus, Greece
21:45 EET		Summary		Stadium: Karaiskakis Stadium; Attendance: 7,500; Referee: (Spain) Alberto Undiano

== Men's Olympic national team ==
The home team is on the left column; the away team is on the right column.

Win Draw Loss

=== 2012 Summer Olympics ===
26 July 2012	Gabon	1 – 1	Switzerland	Newcastle, England
17:15 GMT	Aubameyang 45'	report	5' (pen.) Mehmedi	Stadium: St James' Park; Attendance: 15,748; Referee: Wilmar Roldán (Colombia)

29 July 2012	South Korea	2 – 1	Switzerland	Coventry, England
17:15 GMT	Park Chu-Young 57'; Kim Bo-Kyung 64'	report	60' Emeghara	Stadium: City of Coventry Stadium; Attendance: 30,114; Referee: Raúl Orosco (Bolivia)

1 August 2012	Mexico	1 – 0	Switzerland	Cardiff, Wales
17:00 GMT	O. Peralta 69'	report		Stadium: Millennium Stadium; Referee: Ravshan Irmatov (Uzbekistan)

== Women's national team ==
The home team is on the left column; the away team is on the right column.

Win Draw Loss

=== Euro 2013 qualifying ===
31 March 2012	Switzerland	5 – 0	Turkey	Aarau, Switzerland
18:00 CET	Mändly 3', 9'; Bachmann 30'; Crnogorčević 53'; Dickenmann 87'	report		Stadium: Stadion Brügglifeld; Attendance: 1,200; Referee: Marina Mamaeva (Russia)

5 April 2012	Switzerland	0 – 6	Germany	Aarau, Switzerland
18:15 CET		report	16', 38', 71', 85' Okoyino da Mbabi; 24' Mittag; 64' (o.g.) Egli	Stadium: Stadion Brügglifeld; Attendance: 3,600; Referee: Tanja Schett (Austria)

16 June 2012	Switzerland	4 – 3	Spain	Aarau, Switzerland
18:30 CET	Bachmann 18', 80'; Crnogorčević 54'; Zumbühl 82'	report	25' Paz; 37' García; 73' (pen.) Boquete	Stadium: Stadion Brügglifeld; Attendance: 760; Referee: Kirsi Heikkinen (Finland)

21 June 2012	Romania	4 – 2	Switzerland	Buftea, Romania
18:00 CET	Rus 41', 60', 81'; Duşa 61'	report	8' Crnogorčević; 64' Abbé	Stadium: Stadionul Buftea; Attendance: 100; Referee: Natalia Avdonchenko (Russia)

15 September 2012	Turkey	1 – 3	Switzerland	Istanbul, Turkey
17:00 CET	Uraz 27'	report	25' Dickenmann; 69', 73' Bachmann	Stadium: Atatürk Olympic Stadium; Attendance: 250; Referee: Ginta Pēce (Latvia)

19 September 2012	Kazakhstan	1 – 0	Switzerland	Karaganda, Kazakhstan
15:00 CET	Yalova 58'	report		Stadium: Shakhtyor Stadium; Attendance: 250; Referee: Marija Damjanović (Croatia)

=== 2012 Cyprus Cup ===
28 February 2012	France	3 – 0	Switzerland	Nicosia, Cyprus
14:30 EET	Delie 5'; Thiney 18'; Bompastor 38' (pen.)	report		Stadium: GSP Stadium; Attendance: 20; Referee: Jenny Palmqvist (Sweden)

1 March 2012	Switzerland	0 – 1	England	Larnaca, Cyprus
14:30 EET		report	77' Williams	Stadium: GSZ Stadium; Attendance: 20; Referee: Kirsi Heikkinen (Finland)

4 March 2012	Finland	3 – 1	Switzerland	Paralimni, Cyprus
17:30 EET	Sällström 25', 33', 47'	report	58' Crnogorčević	Stadium: Paralimni Stadium; Attendance: 100; Referee: Vivian Peeters (Netherlands)

6 March 2012	Northern Ireland	0 – 5	Switzerland	Larnaca, Cyprus
12:00 EET		report	Crnogorčević 16', 81'; Mändly 54'; Schwarz 76'; Mehmeti 90'	Stadium: Ammochostos Stadium; Attendance: 100

=== 2013 Cyprus Cup ===
6 March 2012	Canada	2 – 0	Switzerland	Larnaca, Cyprus
14:30 EET	Schmidt 2'; Matheson 79'	report		Stadium: GSZ Stadium; Attendance: 50; Referee: Christina Husballe (Denmark)

8 March 2012	Switzerland	1 – 1	Netherlands	Nicosia, Cyprus
14:30 EET	Bachmann 24'	report	12' Martens	Stadium: GSP Stadium; Attendance: 50

11 March 2012	Finland	2 – 3	Switzerland	Larnaca, Cyprus
17:30 EET	Saari 17'; Talonen 25'	report	1' Bachmann; 45' Dickenmann; 63' Bernauer	Stadium: GSZ Stadium; Attendance: 30; Referee: Rhona Dhaly (Ireland)

13 March 2012	New Zealand	2 – 1	Switzerland	Larnaca, Cyprus
14:30 EET	Hassett 85'; Wilkinson 87'	report	23' Crnogorčević	Stadium: Antonis Papadopoulos Stadium; Attendance: 30; Referee: Barbara Bollenberger (Austria)

=== Friendly matches ===
26 May 2012	Switzerland	1 – 0	Republic of Ireland	Wohlen AG, Switzerland
13:00 CET	Bachmann 46'	report		Stadium: Stadion Niedermatten; Attendance: 400; Referee: Nicole Widmer (Switzerland)

22 August 2012	Austria	1 – 2	Switzerland	Altach, Austria
19:00 CET	Puntigam 63'	report	32' Moser; 56' Dickenmann	Stadium: Cashpoint Arena; Attendance: 853; Referee: Biljana Iskin (Albania)

23 October 2012	Sweden	3 – 0	Switzerland	Växjö, Sweden
19:00 CET	Jakobsson 1'; Asllani 46'; Göransson 77'	report		Stadium: Myresjöhus Arena; Attendance: 4'905; Referee: Lina Lehtovaara (Finland)

16 January 2013	England	1 – 1	Switzerland	Cartagena, Spain
15:30 CET	69'		72'	Stadium: La Manga Club; Attendance: closed

6 April 2013	Switzerland	3 – 1	Norway	Nyon, Switzerland
14:30 CET	Mändly 2'; Crnogorčević 33', 77' (pen.)	report	45+2' Hegerberg	Stadium: Centre sportif de Colovray

19 June 2013	Finland	2 - 2	Switzerland	Helsinki, Finland
18:00 CET	Alanen 8', 72'	report	29' (o.g.) Kukkonen; 78' Bachmann	Stadium: Olympic Stadium; Attendance: 3000

== League standings ==
=== Raiffeisen Super League ===
Pos	Team	Pld	W	D	L	GF	GA	GD	Pts	Qualification or relegation
1	Basel (C)	36	21	9	6	61	31	+30	72	Qualification for the Champions League third qualifying round
2	Grasshopper	36	20	9	7	48	32	+16	69	Qualification for the Champions League third qualifying round
3	St. Gallen	36	17	8	11	54	36	+18	59	Qualification for the Europa League play-off round
4	Zürich	36	16	7	13	62	48	+14	55	Qualification for the Europa League third qualifying round
5	Thun	36	13	9	14	44	46	−2	48	Qualification for the Europa League second qualifying round
6	Sion	36	13	9	14	40	54	−14	48	
7	Young Boys	36	11	10	15	48	50	−2	43	
8	Luzern	36	10	12	14	41	52	−11	42	
9	Lausanne-Sport	36	8	9	19	32	51	−19	33	
10	Servette (R)	36	6	8	22	32	62	−30	26	Relegation to Swiss Challenge League

Source: Swiss Super League (in German)
Rules for classification: 1) points; 2) goal difference; 3) number of goals scored.
(C) Champions; (R) Relegated

=== Challenge League ===
Pos	Team	Pld	W	D	L	GF	GA	GD	Pts	Qualification or relegation
1	Aarau (C)	36	24	6	6	76	40	+36	78	Promotion to 2013–14 Swiss Super League
2	Bellinzona (D, R)	36	21	8	7	62	37	+25	64	Relegation to 2013–14 1. Liga Promotion (Note: Due to financial irregularities, AC Bellinzona was discounted seven points and were ultimately relegated at the end of the season. FC Locarno was thus not relegated in spite of their last-place finish.)
3	Winterthur	36	19	5	12	61	43	+18	62	
4	Wil	36	15	6	15	59	65	−6	51	
5	Biel-Bienne	36	13	8	15	59	59	0	47	
6	Chiasso	36	13	8	15	42	51	−9	47	
7	Lugano	36	11	11	14	52	50	+2	44	
8	Wohlen	36	9	12	15	39	58	−19	39	
9	Vaduz	36	10	7	19	41	52	−11	37	Qualification for the Europa League first qualifying round
10	Locarno	36	5	9	22	32	68	−36	24	

Source: Swiss Challenge League (in German)
Rules for classification: 1) points; 2) goal difference; 3) number of goals scored.
(C) Champions; (D) Disqualified; (R) Relegated

=== 1. Liga Promotion ===
Pos	Team	Pld	W	D	L	GF	GA	GD	Pts	Qualification or relegation
1	FC Schaffhausen	30	21	5	4	75	29	+46	68	Promotion to Challenge League
2	Basel U-21	30	21	5	4	81	38	+43	68	Not eligible to promotion
3	SC Young Fellows Juventus	30	20	6	4	75	29	+46	66	
4	Sion U-21	30	13	11	6	57	39	+18	50	
5	FC Tuggen	30	15	2	13	59	55	+4	47	
6	Zürich U-21	30	11	11	8	58	49	+9	44	
7	SC Kriens	30	13	5	12	54	49	+5	44	
8	SR Delémont	30	10	8	12	40	43	−3	38	
9	BSC Old Boys	30	10	7	13	42	48	−6	37	
10	FC Stade Nyonnais	30	8	9	13	43	51	−8	33	
11	FC Breitenrain Bern	30	8	9	13	40	63	−23	33	
12	SC Brühl	30	8	8	14	40	56	−16	32	
13	St. Gallen U-21	30	9	5	16	44	61	−17	32	
14	Étoile Carouge FC	30	9	5	16	35	54	−19	32	
15	FC Fribourg	30	8	7	15	38	57	−19	31	Relegation to 1. Liga Classic
16	Yverdon-Sport FC	30	2	5	23	25	85	−60	11	Relegation to 1. Liga Classic

Source: RSSSF
Rules for classification: 1) Points; 2) Goal difference; 3) Goals scored; 4) Head-to-head points; 5) Away goals scored; 6) Draw.

=== Swiss Cup ===
The winners of the Semi-finals stage played in the final and the winners of the first semi-final in the draw were considered as home team for the final. In this FC Basel beat FC Sion 1−0. In the second semi-final Grasshoppers Zürich beat their local rivals FC Zürich 2−1 after extra time. The final was held on Whit Monday 20 May a2013 t the Stade de Suisse, Wankdorf.

20 May 2013
16:00
Final

FC Basel	1 – 1 (a.e.t.)	Grasshoppers Zürich
Schär (yellow card) 28'; Dragović (yellow card) 57'; Steinhöfer 71'; Elneny (yellow card) 91'	SFV summary	(yellow card) 29' Gashi; 75' Hajrović
Penalties
Schär (penalty scored); F. Frei (penalty missed); Steinhöfer (penalty scored); Díaz (penalty scored); Bobadilla (penalty missed)	3 – 4	(penalty scored) Salatić; (penalty scored) Hajrović; (penalty missed) Lang; (penalty scored) Feltscher; (penalty scored) Vilotić

Stade de Suisse, Wankdorf, Bern
Attendance: 27,290
Referee: Stephan Studer

GK	(Switzerland) Yann Sommer
DF	(Switzerland) Kay Voser		(substituted off) 60'
DF	(Switzerland) Fabian Schär	(yellow card) 28'
DF	(Austria) Aleksandar Dragović	(yellow card) 57'
DF	(South Korea) Park Joo-Ho
MF	(Switzerland) Fabian Frei
MF	(Chile) Marcelo Díaz
MF	(Egypt) Mohamed Elneny	(yellow card) 91'
MF	(Ivory Coast) Serey Die		(substituted off) 106'
MF	(Switzerland) Valentin Stocker
ST	(Switzerland) Marco Streller (c)		(substituted off) 69'
Substitutes:
DF	(Germany) Markus Steinhöfer		(substituted on) 60'
MF	(Argentina) Raúl Bobadilla		(substituted on) 69'
FW	(Switzerland) David Degen		(substituted on) 106'
Manager:
(Switzerland) Murat Yakin

GK	(Switzerland) Roman Bürki		(substituted off) 46'
DF	(Switzerland) Michael Lang
DF	(Serbia) Milan Vilotić
DF	(Switzerland) Stéphane Grichting
DF	(Austria) Moritz Bauer
MF	(Albania) Amir Abrashi		(substituted off) 95'
MF	(Switzerland) Vero Salatić
MF	(Bosnia and Herzegovina) Izet Hajrović
MF	(Albania) Shkëlzen Gashi	(yellow card) 29'	(substituted off) 100'
MF	(Switzerland) Steven Zuber		(substituted off) 66'
ST	(France) Anatole Ngamukol
Substitutes:
MF	(Venezuela) Frank Feltscher		(substituted on) 66'
MF	(Democratic Republic of the Congo) Nzuzi Toko		(substituted on) 95'
MF	(Switzerland) Nassim Ben Khalifa		(substituted on) 100'
Manager:
(Switzerland) Uli Forte

== Swiss Clubs in Europe ==
- Basel: Champions League second qualifying round
- Luzern: Europa League play-off round
- Young Boys: Europa League second qualifying round
- Servette: Europa League second qualifying round
- USV Eschen/Mauren: Europa League first qualifying round

=== Basel ===
==== Champions League ====
Second qualifying round

17 July 2012 First Leg	Flora Tallinn (Estonia)	0–2	(Switzerland) Basel	A. Le Coq Arena, Tallinn
17:45 CET	Palatu (yellow card) 85'; Jürgenson (yellow card) 90+4'	FCB summary UEFA summary	65' (0:1) A. Frei; (yellow card) 74' Sauro; (yellow card) 79' Vuleta; 86' (pen. 0:2) A. Frei; (yellow card) 90+3' Stocker	Attendance: 3.123; Referee: Mauro Bergonzi (Italy)

24 July 2012 Second Leg	Basel (Switzerland)	3–0 (5–0 agg.)	(Estonia) Flora Tallinn	St. Jakob-Park, Basel
20:00 CET	Zoua 9' (1:0); Zoua 31' (2:0); Díaz 62' (3:0)	FCB summary UEFA summary	(yellow card) 57' Luts	Attendance: 20.467; Referee: Artur Soares Dias (Portugal)

Third qualifying round

1 August 2012 First Leg	Molde FK (Norway)	0–1	(Switzerland) Basel	Aker Stadion, Molde
19:00 CET	Hovland (yellow card) 14'; Angan (red card) 27'	FCB summary UEFA summary	(yellow card) 30' Steinhöfer; (yellow card) 42' Cabral; (yellow card) 75' Stocker; 78' (0:1) Zoua	Attendance: 6.564; Referee: Fredy Fautrel (France)

8 August 2012 Second Leg	Basel (Switzerland)	1–1 (2–1 agg.)	(Norway) Molde FK	St. Jakob-Park, Basel
20:00 CET	D. Degen 75' (1:1); Dragović (yellow card) 90+2'; Sauro (yellow card) 90+2'; D. Degen (yellow card) 90+3'	FCB summary UEFA summary	32' (1:0) Berget	Attendance: 18,567; Referee: Vladislav Bezborodov (Russia)

Playoff round

21 August 2012 First Leg	Basel (Switzerland)	1–2	(Romania) CFR Cluj	St. Jakob-Park, Basel
20:45 CET	Streller 44' (1:0); Stocker (yellow card) 46'; D. Degen (yellow card) 52'; Dragović (yellow card) 78'; Steinhöfer (yellow card) 90+4'; F. Frei (yellow card) 90+4'	FCB summary UEFA summary	(yellow card) 45' Kapetanos; (yellow card) 52' Felgueiras; (yellow card) 55' Bastos; 66' (1:1) Sougou; 71' (1:2) Sougou; (yellow card) 90+4' Saré	Attendance: 16,651; Referee: Jonas Eriksson (Sweden)

29 August 2012 Second Leg	CFR Cluj (Romania)	1–0 (3–1 agg.)	(Switzerland) Basel	Cluj-Napoca, Romania
20:45 CET	Kapetanos 20' (1:0); Felgueiras (yellow card) 42'; Valente (yellow card) 45'; Nicoară (yellow card) 90+2'	FCB summary UEFA summary	(yellow card) 36' Díaz; (yellow card) 75' Cabral; (yellow card) 79' Andrist; (yellow card) 90' Steinhöfer	Stadium: Stadionul Dr. Constantin Rădulescu; Attendance: 15,481; Referee: Gianluca Rocchi

==== Europa League ====
Group stage

20 September 2012 Round 1	Sporting CP (Portugal)	0–0	(Switzerland) Basel	Estádio José Alvalade, Lisbon
21:05	Rojo (yellow card) 30'; Xandão (red card) 50'; Fernandes (yellow card) 60'	Uefa summary FCB summary	(yellow card) 67' Park; (yellow card) 82'Streller	Attendance: 22,325; Referee: Alon Yefet (Israel)

4 October 2012 Round 2	Basel (Switzerland)	2–2	(Belgium) Genk	St. Jakob-Park, Basel
19:00	Dragović (yellow card) 12'; P. Degen (yellow card) 25'; Streller 71' (pen. 1:2); Streller 84' (2:2)	Uefa summary FCB summary	10' (0:1) De Ceulaer; (yellow card) 15' Tshimanga; 38' (0:2) Vossen; (yellow card) 69' Koulibaly	Attendance: 14,023; Referee: Bülent Yıldırım (Turkey)

25 October 2012 Round 3	Videoton (Hungary)	2–1	(Switzerland) Basel	Sóstói Stadion, Székesfehérvár
19:00	Schär 2' (o.g. 1:0); Caneira 32' (2:0)	Uefa summary FCB summary	(yellow card) 79' Stocker; (yellow card) 85' Streller; 90+1' (2:1) Schär	Attendance: 8,500; Referee: Miroslav Zelinka (Czech Republic)

8 November 2012 Round 4	Basel (Switzerland)	1–0	(Hungary) Videoton	St. Jakob-Park, Basel
21:05	D. Degen (yellow card) 51'; Streller (yellow card) 68'; Streller 80' (1:0)	Uefa summary FCB summary	(yellow card) 35' Oliveira	Attendance: 12,743; Referee: Yevhen Aranovskiy (Ukraine)

22 November 2012 Round 5	Basel (Switzerland)	3–0	(Portugal) Sporting CP	St. Jakob-Park, Basel
19:00	Schär 23' (1:0); Cabral (yellow card) 54' (yellow-red card) 58'; Stocker 66' (2:0); D. Degen 71' (3:0); Ajeti (yellow card) 90+2'	Uefa summary FCB summary	(yellow card) 35' Insúa; (yellow card) 41' Labyad; (yellow card) 55' Fernandes; (yellow card) 61' Carrillo	Attendance: 15,666; Referee: Paolo Valeri (Italy)

6 December 2012 Round 6	Genk (Belgium)	0–0	(Switzerland) Basel	Cristal Arena, Genk
21:05	Limbombe (yellow card) 78'	Uefa summary FCB summary	(yellow card) 8' Dragović; (yellow card) 87' P. Degen	Attendance: 11,974; Referee: Mark Clattenburg (England)

Final group table

Pos	Team	Pld	W	D	L	GF	GA	GD	Pts	Qualification
1	(Belgium) Genk	6	3	3	0	9	4	+5	12	Advance to knockout phase
2	(Switzerland) Basel	6	2	3	1	7	4	+3	9	Advance to knockout phase
3	(Hungary) Videoton	6	2	0	4	6	8	−2	6	
4	(Portugal) Sporting CP	6	1	2	3	4	10	−6	5	

Source: Soccerway

Knockout phase

Round of 32

14 February 2013 First leg	Basel (Switzerland)	2–0	(Ukraine) Dnipro Dnipropetrovsk	St. Jakob-Park, Basel
21:05	Stocker 23' (1:0); Park (yellow card) 49'; P. Degen (yellow card) 52'; Serey Die (yellow card) 54'; Streller 67' (2:0)	UEFA summary FCB Summary	(yellow card) 70' Mazuch; (yellow card) 79' Mandzyuk	Attendance: 8,314; Referee: Svein Oddvar Moen (Norway)

21 February 2013 Second leg	Dnipro Dnipropetrovsk (Ukraine)	1–1	(Switzerland) Basel	Dnipro Arena, Dnipropetrovsk
19:00	Fedetskiy (yellow card) 14'; Cheberyachko (yellow card) 32'; Strinić (yellow card) 35'; Kalinić (red card) 63'; Seleznyov 76' (pen. 1:0)	UEFA summary FCB Summary	(yellow card) 13' Serey Die; (yellow card) 33' Cabral; (yellow card) 37' Schär; (red card) 75' F. Frei; 81' (pen. 1:1) Schär	Attendance: 26,501; Referee: Deniz Aytekin (Germany)

Basel won 3–1 on aggregate.

Round of 16

7 March 2013 First leg	Basel (Switzerland)	2–0	(Russia) Zenit St. Petersburg	St. Jakob-Park, Basel
21:05	P. Degen (yellow card) 30'; Serey Die (yellow card) 53'; Díaz (yellow card) 72'; Díaz 83' (1:0); A. Frei 90+4' (pen. 2:0)	UEFA summary FCB Summary	(yellow card) 19' Witsel	Attendance: 15,008; Referee: Daniele Orsato (Italy)

14 March 2013 Second leg	Zenit St. Petersburg (Russia)	1–0	(Switzerland) Basel	Petrovsky Stadium, Saint Petersburg
18:00	Kerzhakov (yellow card) 15'; Witsel 30' (1:0); Denisov (yellow card) 72'; Shirokov (yellow card) 78'; Witsel (yellow card) 78'; Shirokov (penalty missed) 86′	UEFA summary FCB Summary	(yellow card) 41' (yellow-red card) 45' Díaz; (yellow card) 56' P. Degen; (yellow card) 78' F. Frei; (yellow card) 85' Park	Attendance: 19,500; Referee: Paweł Gil (Poland)

Basel won 2–1 on aggregate.

Quarter-finals

4 April 2013 First leg	Tottenham Hotspur (England)	2–2	(Switzerland) Basel	White Hart Lane, London
21:05	Gallas (yellow card) 29'; Adebayor 40' (1:2); Sigurðsson 58' (2:2); Parker (yellow card) 54'	UEFA summary FCB Summary	30' (0:1) Stocker; 34' (0:2) F. Frei; (yellow card) 47' F. Frei	Attendance: 32,136; Referee: Milorad Mažić (Serbia)

11 April 2013 Second leg	Basel (Switzerland)	2–2 (a.e.t.) (4–1 p)	(England) Tottenham Hotspur	St. Jakob-Park, Basel
21:05	Salah 27' (1:1); Dragović 49' (2:1); Serey Die (yellow card) 58'; Streller (yellow card) 93'; Elneny (yellow card) 103'	UEFA summary FCB Summary	23' (0:1) Dempsey; (yellow card) 39' Naughton; (yellow card) 46' Dembélé; 83' (2:2) Dempsey; (yellow card) 93' Dawson; (yellow card) 93' Walker	Attendance: 38,500; Referee: Olegário Benquerença (Portugal)
	Penalties
	Schär (penalty scored); Streller (penalty scored); F. Frei (penalty scored); Díaz (penalty scored)		(penalty missed) Huddlestone; (penalty scored) Sigurðsson; (penalty missed) Adebayor

4–4 on aggregate. Basel won 4–1 on penalties.

Semi-finals

25 April 2013 First leg	Basel (Switzerland)	1–2	(England) Chelsea	St. Jakob-Park, Basel
21:05	Dragović (yellow card) 70'; D. Degen (yellow card) 80'; Schär 87' (pen. 1:1); Schär (yellow card) 89'	UEFA summary FCB Summary	12' (0:1) Moses; (yellow card) 68' A. Cole; (yellow card) 83' David Luiz; (yellow card) 87' Azpilicueta; 90+4' (1:2) David Luiz	Attendance: 36,000; Referee: Pavel Královec (Czech Republic)

2 May 2013 Second leg	Chelsea (England)	3–1 (5–2 agg.)	(Switzerland) Basel	Stamford Bridge, London
21:05	Torres 50' (1:1); Moses 52' (2:1); Azpilicueta (yellow card) 55'; David Luiz 59' (3:1)	UEFA summary FCB Summary	45+1' (0:1) Salah; (yellow card) 66' Schär; (yellow card) 68' Steinhöfer; (yellow card) 88' Serey Die	Attendance: 39,403; Referee: Jonas Eriksson (Sweden)

Chelsea won 5–2 on aggregate.

=== Luzern ===
==== Europa League ====
Play-off round

23 August 2012 First leg	Luzern (Switzerland)	2–1	(Belgium) Genk	Zürich, Switzerland
19:30 CEST (UTC+2)	Rangelov 7'; Winter 71'	UEFA report	Vossen 12'	Stadium: swissporarena Attendance: 8,127; Referee: Antonio Damato (Italy)

30 August 2012 Second leg	Genk (Belgium)	2–0 (3–2 agg.)	(Switzerland) Luzern	Genk, Belgium
20:00 CEST (UTC+2)	Fernández 56'; Masika 88'	UEFA report		Stadium: Cristal Arena; Attendance: 12,135; Referee: Mike Dean (England)

Genk won 3–2 on aggregate.

=== Young Boys ===
==== Europa League ====
Second qualifying round

19 July 2012 1st Leg	Young Boys	1 – 0	Zimbru Chişinău	Bern, Switzerland
19:30 CEST	Frey 53'	UEFA report Match Report (in German)		Stadium: Stade de Suisse; Attendance: 9,117; Referee: Miroslav Zelinka (Czech Republic)

26 July 2012 2nd Leg	Zimbru Chişinău	1 – 0 (a.e.t.) (1 – 1 agg.) (1 – 4 p)	Young Boys	Chișinău, Moldova
20:15 EEST	Barakhoyev 41'	UEFA report Match Report (in German)		Stadium: Zimbru Stadium; Attendance: 4,500; Referee: Kevin Blom (Netherlands)
	Penalties
	Derkach (penalty scored); Molla (penalty missed); Catan (penalty missed)		(penalty scored) Spycher; (penalty scored) Mayuka; (penalty scored) Nef; (penalty scored) Costanzo

1–1 on aggregate. BSC Young Boys won 4–1 on penalties

Third qualifying round

2 August 2012 First Leg	Kalmar FF	1 – 0	Young Boys	Kalmar, Sweden
19:00 CEST	Andersson 18'	UEFA report Report		Stadium: Guldfågeln Arena; Attendance: 3,681; Referee: Fernando Teixeira Vitienes (Spain)

19 August 2012 Second Leg	Young Boys	3 – 0 (3 – 1 agg.)	Kalmar FF	Bern, Switzerland
19:30 CEST	Mayuka 7'; Raimondi 69'; Bobadilla 82'	UEFA report Report		Stadium: Stade de Suisse; Attendance: 10,124; Referee: Halis Özkahya (Turkey)

Young Boys win 3–1 on aggregate

Playoff round

23 August 2012 First Leg	Midtjylland	0 – 3	Young Boys	Herning, Denmark
20:15		UEFA report Report	42' Bobadilla; 81' Farnerud; 90+3' Costanzo	Stadium: MCH Arena; Attendance: 4,522; Referee: Maksim Layushkin (Russia)

30 August 2012 Second Leg	Young Boys	0 – 2 (3 – 2 agg.)	Midtjylland	Bern, Switzerland
19:30		UEFA report Report	75' (pen.) Igboun; 89' Bak Nielsen	Stadium: Stade de Suisse; Attendance: 9,327; Referee: Alexandru Tudor (Romania)

Young Boys win 3–2 on aggregate

Group stage

20 September 2012 1	Young Boys (Switzerland)	3 – 5	(England) Liverpool	Bern, Switzerland
19:00 CET	Nuzzolo 38'; Ojala 53'; Zárate 63'	Report; Match Report (in German)	4' (o.g.) Ojala; 40' Wisdom; 67' Coates; 76', 88' Shelvey	Stadium: Stade de Suisse; Attendance: 31,120; Referee: Michael Koukoulakis (Greece)

4 October 2012 2	Anzhi Makhachkala (Russia)	2 – 0	(Switzerland) Young Boys	Moscow, Russia
18:00 CET	Eto'o 38' (pen.), 90'	Report; Match Report (in German)		Stadium: Lokomotiv Stadium; Attendance: 8,000; Referee: Felix Zwayer (Germany)

25 October 2012 3	Young Boys (Switzerland)	3 – 1	(Italy) Udinese	Bern, Switzerland
21:05 CET	Bobadilla 4', 71', 81' (pen.)	Report; Match Report (in German)	74' Coda	Stadium: Stade de Suisse; Attendance: 20,143; Referee: Clément Turpin (France)

8 November 2012 4	Udinese (Italy)	2 – 3	(Switzerland) Young Boys	Udine, Italy
19:00 CET	Di Natale 47'; Fabbrini 83'	Report; Match Report (in German)	27' Bobadilla; 27' Farnerud; 73' Nuzzolo	Stadium: Stadio Friuli; Attendance: 13,000; Referee: Kristo Tohver (Estonia)

22 November 2012 5	Liverpool (England)	2 – 2	(Switzerland) Young Boys	Liverpool, England
21:05 CET	Shelvey 33'; Cole 72'	Report; Match Report (in German)	52' Bobadilla; 88' Zverotić	Stadium: Anfield; Attendance: 37,810; Referee: Alon Yefet (Israel)

6 December 2012 6	Young Boys (Switzerland)	3 – 1	(Russia) Anzhi Makhachkala	Bern, Switzerland
19:00 CET	Zárate 38'; Costanzo 52'; González 90'	Report; Match Report (in German)	45' Ahmedov; (yellow card) 70' (red card) Traoré	Stadium: Stade de Suisse; Attendance: 17,132; Referee: Matej Jug (Slovenia)

Final group table

Pos	Team	Pld	W	D	L	GF	GA	GD	Pts	Qualification
1	(England) Liverpool	6	3	1	2	11	9	+2	10 (Note: Tiebreakers: Liverpool, Anzhi Makhachkala, and Young Boys are ranked by their head-to-head record.)	Advance to knockout phase
2	(Russia) Anzhi Makhachkala	6	3	1	2	7	5	+2	10	Advance to knockout phase
3	(Switzerland) Young Boys	6	3	1	2	14	13	+1	10	
4	(Italy) Udinese	6	1	1	4	7	12	−5	4	

Source: Soccerway
Notes:

Tiebreakers
Team	Pld	W	D	L	GF	GA	GD	Pts
(England) Liverpool	4	2	1	1	8	6	+2	7
(Russia) Anzhi Makhachkala	4	2	0	2	4	4	0	6
(Switzerland) Young Boys	4	1	1	2	8	10	−2	4

Source: Soccerway

=== Servette ===
==== Europa League ====
Second qualifying round

19 July 2012 First Leg	(Switzerland) Servette	2 – 0	(Armenia) Gandzasar	Geneva
19:45	Karanović 48'; Gissi 79'	Report		Stadium: Stade de Genève; Attendance: 5,830; Referee: Damir Batinić (Federation)

26 July 2012 2nd Leg	(Armenia) Gandzasar	1 – 3 (1 – 5 agg.)	(Switzerland) Servette	Yerevan
17:00	Avagyan 90+1'	Report	De Azevedo 47'; Pont 64', 68'	Stadium: Republican Stadium; Attendance: 1,500; Referee: Eiko Saar (Estonia)

Servette won 5–1 on aggregate

Third qualifying round

2 August 2012 1st Leg	(Switzerland) Servette	1 – 1	(Norway) Rosenborg	Geneva
19:45	Schneider 68'	Report	Dočkal 81'	Stadium: Stade de Genève; Attendance: 5,722; Referee: Simon Lee Evans (Wales)

9 August 2012 2nd Leg	(Norway) Rosenborg	0 – 0 (1 – 1 agg.)	(Switzerland) Servette	Trondheim
19:00		Report		Stadium: Lerkendal Stadion; Attendance: 6,725; Referee: Neil Doyle (Republic of Ireland)

1–1 on aggregate. Rosenborg won on away goals

=== Eschen/Mauren ===
==== Europa League ====
First qualifying round

5 July 2012 First leg	FH (Iceland)	2–1	(Liechtenstein) Eschen/Mauren	Kaplakriki, Hafnarfjörður
21:15	Ingason 44'; Björnsson 81'	Report	Fässler 48'	Attendance: 1,290; Referee: Denis Scherbakov (Belarus)

12 July 2012 Second leg	Eschen/Mauren (Liechtenstein)	0–1	(Iceland) FH	Sportpark Eschen-Mauren, Eschen
19:30		Report	Guðnason 12'	Attendance: 500; Referee: Clayton Pisani (Malta)

FH won 3–1 on aggregate.

== Sources ==
- Josef Zindel (2018). FC Basel 1893. Die ersten 125 Jahre (in German). Basel: Friedrich Reinhardt Verlag. ISBN 978-3-7245-2305-5.
- Switzerland 2012/13 at RSSSF

Preceded by 2011–12	Seasons in Swiss football	Succeeded by 2013–14
