= 2010–11 in Swiss football =

Football in Switzerland
- Season: 2010–11

Men's football
- Super League: Basel
- Challenge League: Lausanne-Sport
- 1. Liga: Group 1: Meyrin
- 1. Liga: Group 2: Schötz
- 1. Liga: Group 3: Brühl SG
- Swiss Cup: Sion

Women's football
- Women's Super League: YB Frauen

The following is a summary of the 2010–11 season of competitive football in Switzerland.

== Super League ==
=== Final league table ===
| Pos | Team | Pld | W | D | L | GF | GA | GD | Pts | Qualification or relegation |
|---|---|---|---|---|---|---|---|---|---|---|
| 1 | Basel (C) | 36 | 21 | 10 | 5 | 76 | 44 | +32 | 73 | Qualification to Champions League group stage (Note: Due to the winners of 2010–11 UEFA Champions League, Barcelona, having qualified for the 2011-12 UEFA Champions League group phase via their domestic leagues and the subsequent vacation of the title holder spot, Basel as Swiss champions were moved up from the third qualification round into the group stage.) |
| 2 | Zürich | 36 | 21 | 9 | 6 | 74 | 44 | +30 | 72 | Qualification to Champions League third qualifying round |
| 3 | Young Boys | 36 | 15 | 12 | 9 | 65 | 50 | +15 | 57 | Qualification to Europa League third qualifying round |
| 4 | Sion | 36 | 15 | 9 | 12 | 47 | 36 | +11 | 54 | Qualification to Europa League play-off round (Note: By winning the 2010–11 Swiss Cup were won the qualification to Europa League play-off round. However, after the two play-off games had been played (the following season), the team was disqualified from the Europa League following Celtic's successful protest over the team's use of ineligible players.) |
| 5 | Thun | 36 | 11 | 16 | 9 | 48 | 43 | +5 | 49 | Qualification to Europa League second qualifying round |
| 6 | Luzern | 36 | 13 | 9 | 14 | 62 | 57 | +5 | 48 | |
| 7 | Grasshopper | 36 | 10 | 11 | 15 | 45 | 54 | −9 | 41 | |
| 8 | Neuchâtel Xamax | 36 | 8 | 8 | 20 | 44 | 67 | −23 | 32 | |
| 9 | Bellinzona (R) | 36 | 7 | 11 | 18 | 42 | 75 | −33 | 32 | Qualification to relegation play-offs |
| 10 | St. Gallen (R) | 36 | 8 | 7 | 21 | 34 | 67 | −33 | 31 | Relegation to Swiss Challenge League |

Source: Super League
Rules for classification: 1) points; 2) goal difference; 3) number of goals scored.
(C) Champions; (R) Relegated

== Challenge League ==
=== Final league table ===
| Pos | Team | Pld | W | D | L | GF | GA | GD | Pts | Promotion or relegation |
|---|---|---|---|---|---|---|---|---|---|---|
| 1 | Lausanne-Sport (C, P) | 30 | 20 | 5 | 5 | 67 | 28 | +39 | 65 | Promotion to 2011–12 Swiss Super League |
| 2 | Servette (O, P) | 30 | 19 | 5 | 6 | 75 | 27 | +48 | 62 | Qualification for promotion/relegation playoffs |
| 3 | Lugano | 30 | 20 | 2 | 8 | 56 | 35 | +21 | 62 | |
| 4 | Vaduz | 30 | 19 | 3 | 8 | 59 | 41 | +18 | 60 | Qualification for Europa League second qualifying round (Note: Vaduz as winners of the 2010–11 Liechtenstein Cup qualified for the second qualifying round of the 2011–12 UEFA Europa League.) |
| 5 | Wil | 30 | 14 | 4 | 12 | 45 | 42 | +3 | 46 | |
| 6 | Stade Nyonnais | 30 | 13 | 7 | 10 | 48 | 51 | −3 | 46 | |
| 7 | Chiasso | 30 | 12 | 5 | 13 | 34 | 37 | −3 | 41 | |
| 8 | Delémont | 30 | 12 | 4 | 14 | 47 | 60 | −13 | 40 | |
| 9 | Biel-Bienne | 30 | 11 | 6 | 13 | 57 | 57 | 0 | 39 | |
| 10 | Wohlen | 30 | 9 | 10 | 11 | 45 | 44 | +1 | 37 | |
| 11 | Aarau | 30 | 9 | 9 | 12 | 39 | 51 | −12 | 36 | |
| 12 | Kriens | 30 | 9 | 6 | 15 | 26 | 50 | −24 | 33 | |
| 13 | Winterthur | 30 | 8 | 8 | 14 | 42 | 51 | −9 | 32 | |
| 14 | Locarno | 30 | 8 | 7 | 15 | 40 | 52 | −12 | 31 | |
| 15 | Schaffhausen (R) | 30 | 7 | 5 | 18 | 36 | 53 | −17 | 26 | Relegation to 2011–12 Swiss 1. Liga |
| 16 | Yverdon-Sport (R) | 30 | 6 | 2 | 22 | 27 | 64 | −37 | 20 | Relegation to 2011–12 Swiss 1. Liga |

Source: Swiss Football League
Rules for classification: 1) points; 2) goal difference; 3) number of goals scored.
(C) Champions; (O) Play-off winners; (P) Promoted; (R) Relegated

=== Promotion/relegation play-offs ===
Bellinzona as 9th-placed Super League team played a two-legged play-off against Challenge League runners-up Servette.

28 May 2011
16:45 CEST

| Bellinzona | 1–0 | Servette |
|---|---|---|
| Pergl 88' | Summary |

Stadio Comunale Bellinzona
Attendance: 4,800
Referee: Alain Bieri

31 May 2011
19:15 CEST

| Servette | 3–1 | Bellinzona |
|---|---|---|
| de Azevedo 11'; Baumann 45' 56' | Summary | Lustrinelli 69' |

Stade de Genève
Attendance: 23,338
Referee: Hänni Nikolaj

Servette won 3–2 on aggregate and achieve promotion.

== 1. Liga ==
=== Group 1 ===
| Pos | Team | Pld | W | D | L | GF | GA | GD | Pts | Qualification or relegation |
|---|---|---|---|---|---|---|---|---|---|---|
| 1 | FC Meyrin | 30 | 21 | 3 | 6 | 74 | 38 | +36 | 66 | Play-off to Challenge League |
| 2 | Étoile Carouge FC | 30 | 16 | 9 | 5 | 57 | 35 | +22 | 57 | Play-off to Challenge League |
| 3 | FC Le Mont | 30 | 14 | 9 | 7 | 62 | 43 | +19 | 51 | Did not apply for licence |
| 4 | ES FC Malley | 30 | 15 | 5 | 10 | 56 | 32 | +24 | 50 | Play-off to Challenge League |
| 5 | Grand-Lancy FC | 30 | 13 | 7 | 10 | 43 | 42 | +1 | 46 | |
| 6 | FC Fribourg | 30 | 13 | 6 | 11 | 48 | 46 | +2 | 45 | |
| 7 | Urania Genève Sport | 30 | 13 | 5 | 12 | 48 | 53 | −5 | 44 | |
| 8 | SC Düdingen | 30 | 12 | 5 | 13 | 57 | 68 | −11 | 41 | |
| 9 | FC Echallens | 30 | 11 | 6 | 13 | 47 | 52 | −5 | 39 | |
| 10 | FC Martigny-Sports | 30 | 10 | 6 | 14 | 36 | 46 | −10 | 36 | |
| 11 | Young Boys U-21 | 30 | 9 | 8 | 13 | 40 | 46 | −6 | 35 | |
| 12 | Sion U-21 | 30 | 9 | 6 | 15 | 44 | 51 | −7 | 33 | |
| 13 | FC Baulmes | 30 | 9 | 6 | 15 | 36 | 48 | −12 | 33 | |
| 14 | FC Naters | 30 | 9 | 5 | 16 | 51 | 65 | −14 | 32 | |
| 15 | US Terre Sainte | 30 | 7 | 11 | 12 | 31 | 45 | −14 | 32 | Relegation to 2. Liga Interregional |
| 16 | CS Chênois | 30 | 8 | 5 | 17 | 35 | 55 | −20 | 29 | Relegation to 2. Liga Interregional |

Source: Erste Liga official website
Rules for classification: 1) Points; 2) Goal difference; 3) Goals scored; 4) Head-to-head points; 5) Away goals scored; 6) Draw.

=== Group 2 ===
| Pos | Team | Pld | W | D | L | GF | GA | GD | Pts | Qualification or relegation |
|---|---|---|---|---|---|---|---|---|---|---|
| 1 | FC Schötz | 30 | 18 | 7 | 5 | 61 | 27 | +34 | 61 | Play-off to Challenge League |
| 2 | Zürich U-21 | 30 | 17 | 8 | 5 | 57 | 29 | +28 | 59 | Not eligible to Play-off |
| 3 | FC Breitenrain Bern | 30 | 16 | 7 | 7 | 48 | 36 | +12 | 55 | Play-off to Challenge League |
| 4 | Basel U-21 | 30 | 14 | 8 | 8 | 68 | 34 | +34 | 50 | Not eligible to Play-off |
| 5 | Grasshopper Club U-21 | 30 | 15 | 4 | 11 | 58 | 48 | +10 | 49 | |
| 6 | Thun U-21 | 30 | 15 | 3 | 12 | 54 | 52 | +2 | 48 | |
| 7 | FC Münsingen | 30 | 12 | 8 | 10 | 44 | 34 | +10 | 44 | |
| 8 | SC Zofingen | 30 | 12 | 6 | 12 | 50 | 48 | +2 | 42 | |
| 9 | BSC Old Boys | 30 | 11 | 9 | 10 | 46 | 46 | 0 | 42 | |
| 10 | FC Wangen bei Olten | 30 | 11 | 7 | 12 | 43 | 47 | −4 | 40 | |
| 11 | SV Muttenz | 30 | 12 | 4 | 14 | 45 | 66 | −21 | 40 | |
| 12 | FC Solothurn | 30 | 9 | 8 | 13 | 46 | 49 | −3 | 35 | |
| 13 | SC Dornach | 30 | 8 | 8 | 14 | 42 | 53 | −11 | 32 | |
| 14 | FC Grenchen | 30 | 6 | 10 | 14 | 40 | 49 | −9 | 28 | |
| 15 | FC Laufen | 30 | 7 | 4 | 19 | 41 | 78 | −37 | 25 | Relegation to 2. Liga Interregional |
| 16 | SC Bümpliz 78 | 30 | 5 | 3 | 22 | 38 | 85 | −47 | 18 | Relegation to 2. Liga Interregional |

Source: Erste Liga official website
Rules for classification: 1) Points; 2) Goal difference; 3) Goals scored; 4) Head-to-head points; 5) Away goals scored; 6) Draw.

=== Group 3 ===
| Pos | Team | Pld | W | D | L | GF | GA | GD | Pts | Qualification or relegation |
|---|---|---|---|---|---|---|---|---|---|---|
| 1 | SC Brühl | 30 | 17 | 6 | 7 | 47 | 29 | +18 | 57 | Play-off to Challenge League |
| 2 | FC Tuggen | 30 | 15 | 9 | 6 | 64 | 43 | +21 | 54 | Play-off to Challenge League |
| 3 | FC Baden | 30 | 15 | 8 | 7 | 57 | 35 | +22 | 53 | Play-off to Challenge League |
| 4 | FC Rapperswil-Jona | 30 | 13 | 11 | 6 | 60 | 44 | +16 | 50 | |
| 5 | SC Young Fellows Juventus | 30 | 14 | 7 | 9 | 59 | 41 | +18 | 49 | |
| 6 | USV Eschen/Mauren | 30 | 13 | 9 | 8 | 59 | 50 | +9 | 48 | |
| 7 | SC Cham | 30 | 13 | 9 | 8 | 51 | 42 | +9 | 48 | |
| 8 | Luzern U-21 | 30 | 13 | 6 | 11 | 57 | 50 | +7 | 45 | |
| 9 | Winterthur U-21 | 30 | 12 | 6 | 12 | 53 | 51 | +2 | 42 | |
| 10 | St. Gallen U-21 | 30 | 12 | 6 | 12 | 59 | 59 | 0 | 42 | |
| 11 | GC Biaschesi | 30 | 10 | 7 | 13 | 48 | 49 | −1 | 37 | |
| 12 | FC Mendrisio | 30 | 10 | 3 | 17 | 39 | 47 | −8 | 33 | |
| 13 | Lugano U-21 | 30 | 8 | 8 | 14 | 39 | 50 | −11 | 32 | |
| 14 | FC Gossau | 30 | 9 | 5 | 16 | 46 | 72 | −26 | 32 | |
| 15 | Zug 94 | 30 | 9 | 4 | 17 | 47 | 65 | −18 | 31 | Relegation to 2. Liga Interregional |
| 16 | SC Buochs | 30 | 3 | 4 | 23 | 32 | 90 | −58 | 13 | Relegation to 2. Liga Interregional |

Source: Erste Liga official website
Rules for classification: 1) Points; 2) Goal difference; 3) Goals scored; 4) Head-to-head points; 5) Away goals scored; 6) Draw.

=== Play-offs ===
==== Qualification round ====
1 June 2011
18:30

| Breitenrain | 1–2 | Brühl |
|---|---|---|
| Goal | Summary | Goal |

Spitalacker, Bern

5 June 2011
16:30

| Brühl | 1–0 | Breitenrain |
|---|---|---|
| Goal | Summary |

Paul-Grüninger-Stadion, St. Gallen

Brühl win 3–1 on aggregate and advance to Finals

1 June 2011
19:30

| Étoile Carouge | 1–1 | Tuggen |
|---|---|---|
| Goal | Summary | Goal |

Stade de la Fontenette, Carouge

5 June 2011
16:00

| Tuggen | 0–4 | Étoile Carouge |
|---|---|---|
| Goal | Summary | Goal |

Linthstrasse, Tuggen

Étoile Carouge win 5–1 on aggregate advance to Finals

1 June 2011
20:00

| Baden | 1–1 | Meyrin |
|---|---|---|
| Goal | Sunnary | Goal |

Esp Stadium, Fislisbach

5 June 2011
18:00

| Meyrin | 0–3 | Baden |
|---|---|---|
| | Summary | Goal |

Stade des Arbères, Meyrin

FC Baden win 4–1 on aggregate advance to Finals

1 June 2011
20:00

| Malley | 2–2 | Schötz |
|---|---|---|
| Goal | Summary | Goal |

Centre sportif de la Blécherette, Lausanne

5 June 2011
15:00

| Schötz | 2–5 | Malley |
|---|---|---|
| Goal | Summary | Goal |

Fussballanlage Wissenhusen, Schötz

Malley win 7–4 on aggregate advance to Finals

==== Final round ====
8 June 2011
19:30

| Étoile Carouge | 1–0 | FC Baden |
|---|---|---|
| Goal | Summary |

Stade de la Fontenette, Carouge

11 June 2011
19:00

| FC Baden | 0–0 | Étoile Carouge |
|---|---|---|
| | Summary |

Stadion Altenburg, Wettingen

Étoile Carouge win 1–0 on aggregate and achieve promotion

8 June 2011
20:00

| Malley | 1–1 | Brühl |
|---|---|---|
| Goal | | Goal |

Centre sportif de la Blécherette, Lausanne

11 June 2011
16:30

| Brühl | 4–2 | Malley |
|---|---|---|
| Goal | Summary | Goal |

Paul-Grüninger-Stadion, St. Gallen

Brühl win 5–3 on aggregate and achieve promotion

== Swiss Cup ==
In the first semi-final Xamax beat Zürich 7–6 in a penalty shoot-out, following a 1–1 draw after extra time, and Sion beat Biel-Bienne 2–1 in the second semi-final. The winner of the first semi-final is considered as home team. The final was played on 29 May 2011 and took place at St. Jakob-Park in Basel.

=== Final ===
29 May 2011
16:30 CET

| Neuchâtel Xamax | 0 – 2 | FC Sion |
|---|---|---|
| | SFV summary | Sio 2'; Vanczák 6' |

St. Jakob-Park, Basel
Attendance: 37,500
Referee: Jérôme Laperrière

== Swiss Clubs in Europe ==
- Basel as league champions: Champions League third qualifying round
- Young Boys as runners-up: Champions League third qualifying round
- Grasshopper Club as third placed team: Europa League play-off round
- Luzern as fourth placed team: Europa League third qualifying round
- Lausanne-Sport as 2009–10 Swiss Cup runners-up: Europa League second qualifying round
- Vaduz as 2009–10 Liechtenstein Cup winners: Europa League second qualifying round

=== Basel ===
==== UEFA Champions League ====
===== Third qualifying round =====
| 28 July 2010 QR3 leg 1 | Debrecen (Hungary) | 0–2 | (Switzerland) Basel | Szusza Ferenc Stadium, Budapest^{1} |
| 20:00 | | UEFA report FCB summary | Stocker 34' (yellow card) 84'; Cabral (yellow card) 50'; G. Xhaka 90+2' | Referee: César Muñiz Fernández (Spain) |

| 4 August 2010 QR3 leg 2 | Basel (Switzerland) | 3–1 | (Hungary) Debrecen | St. Jakob-Park, Basel |
| 19:45 | Inkoom (yellow card) 11'; Çağdaş 26'; Chipperfield 59'; Shaqiri 64' | UEFA report FCB summary | Coulibaly 74' | Referee: Vladislav Bezborodov (Russia) |

Basel won 5–1 on aggregate

- Note 1: Played in Budapest at Szusza Ferenc Stadium as Debrecen's Stadion Oláh Gábor Út did not meet UEFA criteria.

===== Play-off round =====
| 18 August 2010 POR leg 1 | Basel (Switzerland) | 1–0 | (Moldova) Sheriff Tiraspol | St. Jakob-Park, Basel |
| 20:45 | Stocker 54'; Zoua (yellow card) 67' | UEFA report summary | (yellow card) 7' Branković; (yellow card) 53' Samardžić; (yellow card) 85' Vranješ; (yellow card) 76' (yellow-red card) 86' Yerokhin | Attendance: 13,460; Referee: Terje Hauge (NOR) |

| 24 August 2010 POR leg 2 | Sheriff Tiraspol (Moldova) | 0–3 | (Switzerland) Basel | Sheriff Stadium, Tiraspol |
| 20:45 | | UEFA report FCB summary | Frei 80', 87' (yellow card) 17'; Atan (yellow card) 40'; Streller 73' | Attendance: 12,000; Referee: Martin Hansson |

Basel won 4–0 on aggregate

===== Group stage / Group E =====
| 15 September 2010 Matchday 1 | CFR Cluj (Romania) | 2–1 | (Switzerland) Basel | Dr. Constantin Rădulescu, Cluj-Napoca |
| 20:45 | Rada 9' (yellow card) 90+2'; Traoré 12'; Panin (yellow card) 25' | UEFA report FCB report | 45+2' Stocker; (yellow card) 55' Streller | Attendance: 9,593; Referee: Alan Kelly (Ireland) |

| 28 September 2010 Matchday 2 | Basel (Switzerland) | 1–2 | (Germany) Bayern Munich | St. Jakob-Park, Basel |
| 20:45 | Frei 18' | UEFA report FCB summary | 56' (pen.), 89' Schweinsteiger | Attendance: 37,500; Referee: Craig Thomson (Scotland) |

| 19 October 2010 Matchday 3 | Roma (Italy) | 1–3 | (Switzerland) Basel | Stadio Olimpico, Roma |
| 20:45 | Borriello 21' | UEFA report FCB summary | 12' Frei; 44' Inkoom; 90+3' Cabral | Attendance: 22,365; Referee: Aleksey Nikolaev (Russia) |

| 3 November 2010 Matchday 4 | Basel (Switzerland) | 2–3 | (Italy) Roma | St. Jakob-Park, Basel |
| 20:45 | Frei 69'; Shaqiri 83' | UEFA report FCB summary | 16' Menez; 26' Totti; 76' Greco | Attendance: 36,375; Referee: Björn Kuipers (Netherlands) |

| 23 November 2010 Matchday 5 | Basel (Switzerland) | 1–0 | (Romania) CFR Cluj | St. Jakob-Park, Basel |
| 20:45 | Almerares 15' | UEFA summary FCB summary | | Attendance: 34,239; Referee: Laurent Duhamel (France) |

| 8 December 2010 Matchday 6 | Bayern Munich (Germany) | 3–0 | (Switzerland) Basel | Allianz Arena, Munich |
| 20:45 | Ribéry 35', 49'; Tymoshchuk 37' | UEFA report FCB summary | | Attendance: 64,000; Referee: Martin Hansson (Sweden) |

| Pos | Team | Pld | W | D | L | GF | GA | GD | Pts | Qualification | BAY | ROM | BAS | CFR |
|---|---|---|---|---|---|---|---|---|---|---|---|---|---|---|
| 1 | (Germany) Bayern Munich | 6 | 5 | 0 | 1 | 16 | 6 | +10 | 15 | Advance to knockout phase | — | 2–0 | 3–0 | 3–2 |
| 2 | (Italy) Roma | 6 | 3 | 1 | 2 | 10 | 11 | −1 | 10 | Advance to knockout phase | 3–2 | — | 1–3 | 2–1 |
| 3 | (Switzerland) Basel | 6 | 2 | 0 | 4 | 8 | 11 | −3 | 6 | Transfer to Europa League | 1–2 | 2–3 | — | 1–0 |
| 4 | (Romania) CFR Cluj | 6 | 1 | 1 | 4 | 6 | 12 | −6 | 4 | | 0–4 | 1–1 | 2–1 | — |

Source: Soccerway

==== UEFA Europa League / knockout phase ====
===== Round of 32 =====
| 17 February 2011 First leg | Basel (Switzerland) | 2–3 | (Russia) Spartak Moscow | St. Jakob-Park, Basel |
| 21:05 CEST | Stocker (yellow card) 34'; Frei 36'; Streller 41'; Yapi (yellow card) 48'; Shaqiri (red card) 78'; Kusunga (yellow card) 90+1' | UEFA report FCB summary | (yellow card) 34' McGeady; (yellow card) 52' De Sousa Pereira; 61' D. Kombarov; 70' Dzyuba; (yellow card) 82' Dikan; (yellow card) 90' Suchý; 90+2' Ananidze | Attendance: 13,073; Referee: Aleksandar Stavrev (Macedonia) |

| 24 February 2011 Second leg | Spartak Moscow (Russia) | 1–1 | (Switzerland) Basel | Luzhniki Stadium, Moscow |
| 19:00 CEST | McGeady 90+1' | UEFA report FCB summary | 15' Chipperfield; (yellow card) 31' Cabral; (yellow card) 72' Zoua; (yellow card) 86' Safari | Attendance: 14,977; Referee: Cristian Balaj (Romania) |

Spartak Moscow won 4–3 on aggregate.

=== Young Boys ===
==== UEFA Champions League ====
===== Third qualifying round =====
| 28 July 2010 First leg | Young Boys (Switzerland) | 2–2 | (Turkey) Fenerbahçe | Stade de Suisse, Bern |
| 20:15 | Dudar 18'; Costanzo 89' (pen.) | Report | Emre 5'; Stoch 42' | Attendance: 19,091; Referee: Svein Oddvar Moen (Norway) |

| 4 August 2010 Second leg | Fenerbahçe (Turkey) | 0–1 | (Switzerland) Young Boys | Şükrü Saracoğlu Stadium, Istanbul |
| 20:15 | | Report | Bienvenu 40' | Attendance: 35,260; Referee: Aleksei Nikolaev (Russia) |

Young Boys won 3–2 on aggregate.

===== Play-off round =====
| 17 August 2010 First leg | Young Boys (Switzerland) | 3–2 | (England) Tottenham Hotspur | Stade de Suisse, Bern |
| 20:45 | Lulić 4'; Bienvenu 13'; Hochstrasser 28' | Report | Bassong 42'; Pavlyuchenko 83' | Attendance: 30,166; Referee: Frank De Bleeckere (Belgium) |

| 25 August 2010 Second leg | Tottenham Hotspur (England) | 4–0 | (Switzerland) Young Boys | White Hart Lane, London |
| 20:45 | Crouch 5', 61', 78' (pen.); Defoe 32' | Report | | Attendance: 34,709; Referee: Laurent Duhamel (France) |

Tottenham won 6–3 on aggregate.

=== Grasshopper Club ===
==== UEFA Europa League ====
===== Play-off round =====
| 19 August 2010 First leg | Steaua București (Romania) | 1–0 | (Switzerland) Grasshopper Club | Stadionul Steaua, Bucharest |
| 19:45 | Stancu 71' | Report | | Attendance: 20,000; Referee: Jonas Eriksson (Sweden) |

| 26 August 2010 Second leg | Grasshopper Club (Switzerland) | 1–0 (a.e.t.) (3–4 p) | (Romania) Steaua București | Letzigrund, Zürich |
| 19:30 | Salatić 77' | Report | | Attendance: 5,200; Referee: Milorad Mažić (Serbia) |
| | Penalties |
| | Smiljanić (penalty missed); Salatić (penalty scored); Abrashi (penalty scored); Hajrović (penalty scored); Adili (penalty missed) | | (penalty scored) Stancu; (penalty scored) Surdu; (penalty scored) Angelov; (penalty scored) Latovlevici |

1–1 on aggregate. Steaua București won 4–3 on penalties.

=== Luzern ===
==== UEFA Europa League ====
===== Third qualifying round =====
| 29 July 2010 First leg | Utrecht (Netherlands) | 1–0 | (Switzerland) Luzern | Utrecht, Netherlands |
| 18:45 CEST (UTC+2) | Mertens 35' | Report | | Stadium: Stadion Galgenwaard; Attendance: 12,100; Referee: Peter Rasmussen (Denmark) |

| 5 August 2010 Second leg | Luzern (Switzerland) | 1–3 (1–4 agg.) | (Netherlands) Utrecht | Zürich, Switzerland |
| 19:45 CEST (UTC+2) | Pacar 53' | Report | Asare 13'; Van Wolfswinkel 22'; Silberbauer 28' | Stadium: Letzigrund (Note: Played in Zürich at Letzigrund as Luzern's Stadion Allmend did not meet UEFA criteria.); Attendance: 7,100; Referee: Aleksei Kulbakov (Belarus) |
Note: *Played in Zürich at Letzigrund as Luzern's Stadion Allmend did not meet UEFA criteria.

Utrecht won 4–1 on aggregate.

=== Lausanne ===
==== UEFA Europa League ====
===== Second qualifying round =====
| 15 July 2010 First leg | Lausanne-Sport (Switzerland) | 1–0 | (Bosnia and Herzegovina) Borac Banja Luka | Stade Olympique de la Pontaise, Lausanne |
| 19:30 | Silvio 19' | Report | | Attendance: 3,850; Referee: Vladimir Pettay (Russia) |

| 22 July 2010 Second leg | Borac Banja Luka (Bosnia and Herzegovina) | 1–1 | (Switzerland) Lausanne-Sport | City Stadium of Banja Luka, Banja Luka |
| 20:45 | Vukelja 69' | Report | Roux 65' | Attendance: 9,000; Referee: Artur Soares Dias (Portugal) |

Lausanne-Sport won 2–1 on aggregate.

===== Third qualifying round =====
| 29 July 2010 First leg | Randers (Denmark) | 2–3 | (Switzerland) Lausanne-Sport | Essex Park Randers, Randers |
| 19:00 | Movsisyan 7', 81' | Report | Steuble 41'; Silvio 62' (pen.), 84' | Attendance: 2,751; Referee: Ovidiu Alin Hațegan (Romania) |

| 5 August 2010 Second leg | Lausanne-Sport (Switzerland) | 1–1 | (Denmark) Randers | Stade Olympique de la Pontaise, Lausanne |
| 19:30 | Rodrigo 68' | Report | Movsisyan 49' | Attendance: 8,150; Referee: Alan Black (Northern Ireland) |

Lausanne-Sport won 4–3 on aggregate.

===== Play-off round =====
| 19 August 2010 First leg | Lausanne-Sport (Switzerland) | 1–1 | (Russia) Lokomotiv Moscow | Stade Olympique de la Pontaise, Lausanne |
| 20:30 | Traoré 28' | Report | Sychev 65' | Attendance: 11,200; Referee: Gediminas Mažeika (Lithuania) |

| 26 August 2010 Second leg | Lokomotiv Moscow (Russia) | 1–1 (a.e.t.) (3 – 4 p) | (Switzerland) Lausanne-Sport | Lokomotiv Stadium, Moscow |
| 18:00 | Aliyev 85' | Report | Sílvio 17' | Attendance: 11,053; Referee: Aleksandar Stavrev (Macedonia) |
| | Penalties |
| | Aliyev (penalty scored); Sychev (penalty scored); Loskov (penalty scored); Shishkin (penalty missed); Maicon (penalty missed) | | (penalty scored) Sílvio; (penalty scored) Carrupt; (penalty scored) Rodrigo; (penalty missed) Katz; (penalty scored) Celestini |

2–2 on aggregate. Lausanne-Sport won 4–3 on penalties.

===== Group stage / group F =====
| 16 September 2010 Matchday 1 | Lausanne-Sport (Switzerland) | 0–3 | (Russia) CSKA Moscow | Stade Olympique de la Pontaise, Lausanne |
| 19:00 | | Report | Vágner Love 22', 80' (pen.); Ignashevich 68' | Attendance: 9,531; Referee: Simon Lee Evans (Wales) |

| 30 September 2010 Matchday 2 | Palermo (Italy) | 1–0 | (Switzerland) Lausanne-Sport | Stadio Renzo Barbera, Palermo |
| 21:05 | Migliaccio 79' | Report | | Attendance: 9,772; Referee: Hannes Kaasik (Estonia) |

| 21 October 2010 Matchday 3 | Sparta Prague (Czech Republic) | 3–3 | (Switzerland) Lausanne-Sport | Generali Arena, Prague |
| 21:05 | Bony 10', 24'; Kucka 21' | Report | Meoli 6'; Steuble 75'; Sílvio 90+5' | Attendance: 12,430; Referee: Tony Asumaa (Finland) |

| 4 November 2010 Matchday 4 | Lausanne-Sport (Switzerland) | 1–3 | (Czech Republic) Sparta Prague | Stade Olympique de la Pontaise, Lausanne |
| 19:00 | Katz 6' | Report | Bony 45', 90+6'; Kweuke 75' | Attendance: 7,200; Referee: Aleksei Kulbakov (Belarus) |

| 2 December 2010 Matchday 5 | CSKA Moscow (Russia) | 5–1 | (Switzerland) Lausanne-Sport | Arena Khimki, Khimki |
| 19:00 | Necid 18', 82'; Oliseh 22'; Tošić 40'; Dzagoev 71' | Report | Carrupt 90+2' | Attendance: 4,500; Referee: Michael Weiner (Germany) |

| 15 December 2010 Matchday 6 | Lausanne-Sport (Switzerland) | 0–1 | (Italy) Palermo | Stade Olympique de la Pontaise, Lausanne |
| 19:00 | | Report | Muñoz 84' | Attendance: 7,150; Referee: Anton Genov (Bulgaria) |

| Pos | Team | Pld | W | D | L | GF | GA | GD | Pts | Qualification | CSM | SPP | PAL | LAU |
|---|---|---|---|---|---|---|---|---|---|---|---|---|---|---|
| 1 | (Russia) CSKA Moscow | 6 | 5 | 1 | 0 | 18 | 3 | +15 | 16 | Advance to knockout phase | — | 3–0 | 3–1 | 5–1 |
| 2 | (Czech Republic) Sparta Prague | 6 | 2 | 3 | 1 | 12 | 12 | 0 | 9 | Advance to knockout phase | 1–1 | — | 3–2 | 3–3 |
| 3 | (Italy) Palermo | 6 | 2 | 1 | 3 | 7 | 11 | −4 | 7 | | 0–3 | 2–2 | — | 1–0 |
| 4 | (Switzerland) Lausanne-Sport | 6 | 0 | 1 | 5 | 5 | 16 | −11 | 1 | | 0–3 | 1–3 | 0–1 | — |

Source: Soccerway

=== Vaduz ===
==== UEFA Europa League ====
===== Second qualifying round =====
| 15 July 2010 First leg | Brøndby (Denmark) | 3–0 | (Liechtenstein) Vaduz | Brøndby Stadium, Copenhagen |
| 20:00 | Nilsson 51'; Jallow 80', 85' | Report | | Attendance: 7,966; Referee: Kristo Tohver (Estonia) |

| 22 July 2010 Second leg | Vaduz (Liechtenstein) | 0–0 | (Denmark) Brøndby | Rheinpark Stadion, Vaduz |
| 20:00 | | Report | | Attendance: 1,984; Referee: Mario Vlk (Slovakia) |

Brøndby won 3–0 on aggregate.

== Sources ==
- Switzerland 2010–11 at RSSSF
- 1. Liga season 2010–11 at the official website
- Cup finals at Fussball-Schweiz
- Josef Zindel (2018). FC Basel 1893. Die ersten 125 Jahre (in German). Basel: Friedrich Reinhardt Verlag. ISBN 978-3-7245-2305-5.

| Preceded by 2009–10 | Seasons in Swiss football | Succeeded by 2011–12 |
