= 2011–12 in Swiss football =

Football in Switzerland
- Season: 2011–12

Men's football
- Super League: Basel
- Challenge League: St. Gallen
- 1. Liga group 1: Sion U-21
- 1. Liga group 2: BSC Old Boys
- 1. Liga group 3: Tuggen
- Swiss Cup: Basel

Women's football
- Women's Super League: Zürich Frauen

The following is a summary of the 2011–12 season of competitive football in Switzerland.

== Super League ==
The Super League is the top tier of the Swiss football league system. The 2011–12 season was the 115th season since its foundation and the season began on 16 July 2011 and ended on 23 May 2012.

=== Final league table ===
Pos	Team	Pld	W	D	L	GF	GA	GD	Pts	Qualification or relegation
1	Basel (C)	34	22	8	4	78	33	+45	74	Qualification to Champions League second qualifying round
2	Luzern	34	14	12	8	46	32	+14	54	Qualification to Europa League play-off round (Note: Because 2011–12 Swiss Cup winners Basel qualified for the Champions League, and runners-up Luzern qualified for the Europa League through league position, the distribution of the Europa League spots reverted to league position.)
3	Young Boys	34	13	12	9	52	38	+14	51	Qualification to Europa League second qualifying round
4	Servette	34	14	6	14	45	53	−8	48	Qualification to Europa League second qualifying round
5	Thun	34	11	10	13	38	41	−3	43	
6	Zürich	34	11	8	15	43	44	−1	41	
7	Lausanne-Sport	34	8	6	20	29	61	−32	30	
8	Grasshopper	34	7	5	22	32	66	−34	26	
9	Sion (O)	34	15	8	11	40	35	+5	17 (Note: Sion were deducted 36 points for fielding ineligible players.)	Qualification to relegation play-offs
10	Neuchâtel Xamax (R, D, R, R, R)	18	7	5	6	22	22	0	26 (Note: Neuchâtel Xamax's license was revoked with immediate effect and they were expelled from the Swiss Football League on 18 January 2012 after not providing necessary financial documents and guarantees. The first-half results of the club will be kept while any matches in spring involving Xamax were cancelled.)	Demotion to the 2. Liga interregional

Source: RSSSF
Rules for classification: 1) points; 2) goal difference; 3) number of goals scored.
(C) Champions; (D) Disqualified; (O) Play-off winners; (R) Relegated

== Challenge League ==
The 2011–12 Challenge League was the ninth season of the Swiss Challenge League, the second tier in the Swiss football league pyramid. The season began on 22 July 2011 and ended on 23 May 2012. Due to the creation of the 1. Liga Promotion that was due to commence the following year, this season would see the reduction in the number of teams competing from 16 to 10. This reconstruction was done to decrease the competitive gap between the two top tiers by converting the second to a purely professional league. The new Promotion League would therefore serve as the semi-professional link to amateur football. Therefore, six teams were due to be relegated, however, as Neuchâtel Xamax were demoted from the top tier to the sixth level, subsequently only five teams were relegated.

=== Final league table ===
Pos	Team	Pld	W	D	L	GF	GA	GD	Pts	Promotion or relegation
1	St. Gallen (C, P)	30	19	7	4	67	31	+36	64	Promoted to 2012–13 Swiss Super League
2	Aarau	30	18	5	7	64	34	+30	59	Qualification for Promotion play-off
3	Bellinzona	30	18	5	7	49	21	+28	59	
4	Winterthur	30	15	8	7	44	29	+15	53	
5	Lugano	30	14	7	9	44	38	+6	49	
6	Wil	30	12	10	8	59	41	+18	46	
7	Chiasso	30	11	12	7	34	23	+11	45	
8	Vaduz	30	13	6	11	54	45	+9	45	
9	Locarno	30	12	9	9	47	44	+3	45	
10	Biel-Bienne	30	12	7	11	55	54	+1	43	
11	Wohlen	30	9	9	12	39	44	−5	36	
12	Stade Nyonnais (R)	30	8	10	12	41	49	−8	34	Relegation to 2012–13 1. Liga Promotion
13	Étoile Carouge (R)	30	8	6	16	25	56	−31	30	Relegation to 2012–13 1. Liga Promotion
14	Delémont (R)	30	4	8	18	24	60	−36	20	Relegation to 2012–13 1. Liga Promotion
15	Kriens (R)	30	4	5	21	37	66	−29	17	Relegation to 2012–13 1. Liga Promotion
16	Brühl (R)	30	4	4	22	30	78	−48	16	Relegation to 2012–13 1. Liga Promotion

Source: RSSSF
Rules for classification: 1) points; 2) goal difference; 3) number of goals scored.
(C) Champions; (P) Promoted; (R) Relegated

=== Promotion/relegation play-offs ===
The ninth-placed Super League team Sion played a two-legged play-off against the Challenge League runners-up Aarau for the last slot in the top tier in the 2012–13 season.

26 May 2012
15:00 CEST

Sion	2–0	Aarau
Winter 58', 81'	Report

Stade Tourbillon, Sion
Attendance: 10,800
Referee: Stephan Studer

28 May 2012
17:00 CEST

Aarau	1–0	Sion
Gashi 55'	Report

Stadion Brügglifeld, Aarau
Attendance: 8,800
Referee: Patrick Graf

Sion won 2–1 on aggregate and the two teams remained in their divisions.

== 1. Liga ==
The 1. Liga was up until here, the third highest tier in the Swiss football league pyramid, it was the highest tier in amateur football. The 1. Liga was divided into three regional groups, each with 16 teams. Due to the creation of the 1. Liga Promotion that was due to commence the following year, this season would see the number of teams in the groups reduced from 16 to 14 and it would be renamed as 1. Liga Classic. The new Promotion League would serve as the semi-professional link to amateur football. Six clubs could achieve promotion to the new third division, if they had applied for the semi-professional status. The four best U-21 teams would receive a wild card and advance as well. This reconstruction was done to decrease the competitive gap between the two top tiers and the amateur league. No teams were to be relegated to the next lowest level, then the fourth tier which would become the new fifth level.

=== Group 1 ===
Pos	Team	Pld	W	D	L	GF	GA	GD	Pts	Qualification or relegation
1	Sion U-21	30	17	5	8	70	41	+29	56	Youth team wild card
2	Young Boys U-21	30	16	4	10	74	50	+24	52	To 1. Liga Classic
3	FC Fribourg	30	16	4	10	52	40	+12	52	Promoted to 2012–13 1. Liga Promotion
4	Yverdon-Sport FC	30	15	7	8	53	44	+9	52	Promoted to 2012–13 1. Liga Promotion
5	FC Le Mont	30	15	6	9	51	45	+6	51	To 1. Liga Classic
6	Grand-Lancy FC	30	13	9	8	56	44	+12	48	To 1. Liga Classic
7	FC Meyrin	30	13	6	11	57	42	+15	45	To 1. Liga Classic
8	SC Düdingen	30	14	3	13	63	59	+4	45	To 1. Liga Classic
9	FC Echallens	30	12	8	10	62	49	+13	44	To 1. Liga Classic
10	FC Martigny-Sports	30	11	8	11	51	50	+1	41	To 1. Liga Classic
11	ES FC Malley	30	10	8	12	66	61	+5	38	To 1. Liga Classic
12	FC Bulle	30	10	7	13	46	59	−13	37	To 1. Liga Classic
13	Urania Genève Sport	30	10	6	14	51	67	−16	36	To 1. Liga Classic
14	FC Monthey	30	7	9	14	50	66	−16	30	To 1. Liga Classic
15	FC Naters	30	8	5	17	42	72	−30	29	To 1. Liga Classic
16	FC Baulmes	30	3	5	22	25	80	−55	14	To 1. Liga Classic

Source: Erste Liga official website
Rules for classification: 1) Points; 2) Goal difference; 3) Goals scored; 4) Head-to-head points; 5) Away goals scored; 6) Draw.

=== Group 2 ===
Pos	Team	Pld	W	D	L	GF	GA	GD	Pts	Qualification or relegation
1	BSC Old Boys	30	20	2	8	68	36	+32	62	Promoted to 2012–13 1. Liga Promotion
2	FC Breitenrain Bern	30	18	7	5	54	25	+29	61	Promoted to 2012–13 1. Liga Promotion
3	FC Baden	30	19	3	8	61	31	+30	60	To 1. Liga Classic
4	Zürich U-21	30	16	3	11	55	49	+6	51	Youth team wild card
5	FC Münsingen	30	14	8	8	42	36	+6	50	To 1. Liga Classic
6	Basel U-21	30	13	8	9	56	36	+20	47	Youth team wild card
7	FC Solothurn	30	13	6	11	52	43	+9	45	To 1. Liga Classic
8	SC Dornach	30	12	8	10	54	50	+4	44	To 1. Liga Classic
9	FC Schötz	30	12	6	12	54	57	−3	42	To 1. Liga Classic
10	Grasshopper Club U-21	30	12	4	14	50	58	−8	40	To 1. Liga Classic
11	FC Wangen bei Olten	30	8	9	13	29	47	−18	33	To 1. Liga Classic
12	FC Serrières	30	7	11	12	43	47	−4	32	To 1. Liga Classic
13	FC Grenchen	30	8	5	17	29	64	−35	29	To 1. Liga Classic
14	SV Muttenz	30	8	3	19	41	74	−33	27	To 1. Liga Classic
15	Thun U-21	30	6	8	16	46	58	−12	26	To 1. Liga Classic
16	SC Zofingen	30	5	7	18	35	58	−23	22	To 1. Liga Classic

Source: Erste Liga official website
Rules for classification: 1) Points; 2) Goal difference; 3) Goals scored; 4) Head-to-head points; 5) Away goals scored; 6) Draw.

=== Group 3 ===
Pos	Team	Pld	W	D	L	GF	GA	GD	Pts	Qualification or relegation
1	FC Tuggen	30	22	3	5	69	31	+38	69	Promoted to 2012–13 1. Liga Promotion
2	FC Schaffhausen	30	21	3	6	88	28	+60	66	Promoted to 2012–13 1. Liga Promotion
3	SC Young Fellows Juventus	30	20	4	6	83	34	+49	64	Promoted to 2012–13 1. Liga Promotion
4	USV Eschen/Mauren	30	15	8	7	56	43	+13	53	To 1. Liga Classic
5	St. Gallen U-21	30	14	8	8	52	43	+9	50	Youth team wild card
6	FC Rapperswil-Jona	30	11	14	5	60	51	+9	47	To 1. Liga Classic
7	SC Cham	30	13	6	11	58	46	+12	45	To 1. Liga Classic
8	FC Mendrisio	30	12	6	12	38	33	+5	42	To 1. Liga Classic
9	Luzern U-21	30	12	4	14	56	59	−3	40	To 1. Liga Classic
10	FC Balzers	30	10	5	15	48	66	−18	35	To 1. Liga Classic
11	Winterthur U-21	30	9	5	16	37	57	−20	32	To 1. Liga Classic
12	GC Biaschesi	30	6	11	13	39	53	−14	29	To 1. Liga Classic
13	Lugano U-21	30	8	4	18	36	64	−28	28	To 1. Liga Classic
14	FC Muri	30	7	7	16	35	66	−31	28	To 1. Liga Classic
15	SV Höngg	30	6	5	19	31	70	−39	23	To 1. Liga Classic
16	FC Gossau	30	5	5	20	42	84	−42	20	To 1. Liga Classic

Source: Erste Liga official website
Rules for classification: 1) Points; 2) Goal difference; 3) Goals scored; 4) Head-to-head points; 5) Away goals scored; 6) Draw.

== Swiss Cup ==
In the first semi-final Basel beat Winterthur 2–1 and Luzern beat Sion 1–0 in the second semi-final. The winner of the first semi-final was considered as home team in the final, which was played on 16 May 2012 at the Stade de Suisse in Bern.

=== Final ===
16 May 2012
20:30 CEST
Final

Basel	1–1 (a.e.t.)	Luzern
Dragović (yellow card) 40'; Huggel 56' (1:0); G. Xhaka (yellow card) 90'	SFV summary FCB summary	(yellow card) 57' Wiss; 67' (1:1) Puljić; (yellow card) 90' Gygax
Penalties
Yapi Yapo (penalty scored); Streller (penalty scored); Zoua (penalty scored); Shaqiri (penalty scored)	4–2	(penalty scored) Renggli; (penalty missed) Ohayon; (penalty scored) Gygax; (penalty missed) Stahel

Stade de Suisse, Bern
Attendance: 30,100
Referee: (Switzerland) Daniel Wermelinger

== Swiss Clubs in Europe ==
- Basel as league champions: Champions League group stage
- Zürich as runner-up: Champions League third qualifying round
- Young Boys as third placed team: Europa League third qualifying round
- Sion as 2010–11 Swiss Cup winners: Europa League play-off round
- Thun as fifth placed team: Europa League second qualifying round
- Vaduz as 2010–11 Liechtenstein Cup winners: Europa League second qualifying round

=== Basel ===
==== UEFA Champions League ====
===== Group stage / Group C =====
14 September 2011 Matchday 1	Basel (Switzerland)	2–1	(Romania) Oțelul Galaţi	Basel, Switzerland
20:45 CEST	Streller (yellow card) 35'; F. Frei 39'; Benjamin Huggel (yellow card) 52' (red card) 87'; A. Frei 84' (pen.)	(Report)	Râpă (yellow card) 49'; Pena 58'; Sălăgeanu (red card) 82'; Antal (yellow card) 90+1'; Grahovac (yellow card) 90+3'	Stadium: St. Jakob Park; Attendance: 30,126; Referee: William Collum (Scotland)

27 September 2011 Matchday 2	Manchester United (England)	3–3	(Switzerland) Basel	Manchester, England
20:45 CEST	Welbeck 16', 17'; Young 90'	(Report)	A. Frei (yellow card) 34', (goal) 61', 76' (pen.); F. Frei 58'; G. Xhaka (yellow card) 71'	Stadium: Old Trafford; Attendance: 73,115; Referee: Paolo Tagliavento (Italy)

18 October 2011 Matchday 3	Basel (Switzerland)	0–2	(Portugal) Benfica	Basel, Switzerland
20:45 CEST	Streller (yellow card) 35'; Huggel (yellow card) 74'; Shaqiri (yellow card) 90+1'; A. Frei (yellow card) 90+3'	(Report)	Bruno César 20'; Emerson (yellow card) 41' (red card) 86'; Cardozo 75'; Artur (yellow card) 90'	Stadium: St. Jakob Park; Attendance: 35,831; Referee: Viktor Kassai (Hungary)

2 November 2011 Matchday 4	Benfica (Portugal)	1–1	(Switzerland) Basel	Lisbon, Portugal
20:45 CET	Rodrigo 4'; Aimar (yellow card) 45+1'; Garay (yellow card) 45+2'; Pereira (yellow card) 57'; Vítor (yellow card) 89'	(Report)	Park (yellow card) 18'; Huggel (yellow card) 34', (goal) 64'	Stadium: Estádio da Luz; Attendance: 39,270; Referee: Carlos Velasco Carballo (Spain)

22 November 2011 Matchday 5	Oțelul Galați (Romania)	2–3	(Switzerland) Basel	Bucharest, Romania
20:45 CET	Sălăgeanu (yellow card) 33'; Giurgiu 75'; Antal 81'	(Report)	F. Frei 10'; A. Frei 14'; Streller 37'; Dragović (yellow card) 62'; Cabral (yellow card) 72'	Stadium: Stadionul Național; Attendance: 5,787; Referee: Tom Harald Hagen (Norway)

7 December 2011 Matchday 6	Basel (Switzerland)	2–1	(England) Manchester United	Basel, Switzerland
20:45 CET	Streller 9'; T. Xhaka (yellow card) 28'; A. Frei 84'; F. Frei (yellow card) 90+1'	(UEFA Report) (BBC Sport Report)	Young (yellow card) 45+3'; Evra (yellow card) 87'; Jones 89'	Stadium: St. Jakob Park; Attendance: 36,894; Referee: Björn Kuipers (Netherlands)

Pos	Team	Pld	W	D	L	GF	GA	GD	Pts	Qualification	BEN	BAS	MU	OG
1	(Portugal) Benfica	6	3	3	0	8	4	+4	12	Advance to knockout phase	—	1–1	1–1	1–0
2	(Switzerland) Basel	6	3	2	1	11	10	+1	11	Advance to knockout phase	0–2	—	2–1	2–1
3	(England) Manchester United	6	2	3	1	11	8	+3	9	Transfer to Europa League	2–2	3–3	—	2–0
4	(Romania) Oțelul Galați	6	0	0	6	3	11	−8	0		0–1	2–3	0–2	—

Source: Soccerway

===== Knockout phase =====
22 February 2012 RO16 1st leg	Basel (Switzerland)	1–0	(Germany) Bayern Munich	Basel, Switzerland
20:45 CEST	Abraham (yellow card) 63'; Stocker 86'	Report	(yellow card) 72' Müller; (yellow card) 82' Rafinha	Stadium: St. Jakob-Park; Attendance: 36,000 (sold out); Referee: Nicola Rizzoli (Italy)

13 March 2012 RO16 2nd leg	Bayern Munich (Germany)	7–0 (7–1 agg.)	(Switzerland) Basel	Munich, Germany
20:45 CEST	Robben 10', 81'; Müller 42'; Gómez 44', 50', 61', 67'; Boateng (yellow card) 80'	Report	(yellow card) 60' Streller; (yellow card) 82' Cabral	Stadium: Allianz Arena; Attendance: 66,000 (sold out); Referee: Mark Clattenburg (England)

=== Zürich ===
==== UEFA Champions League ====
===== Third qualifying round =====
27 July 2011 First leg	Standard Liège (Belgium)	1–1	(Switzerland) Zürich	Stade Maurice Dufrasne, Liège
20:15	González 90'	Report	Mehmedi 79'	Attendance: 13,727; Referee: Alon Yefet (Israel)

3 August 2011 Second leg	Zürich (Switzerland)	1–0	(Belgium) Standard Liège	Letzigrund, Zürich
20:15	Mehmedi 58'	Report		Attendance: 10,500; Referee: Paolo Valeri (Italy)

Zürich won 2–1 on aggregate.

===== Play-off round =====
17 August 2011 First leg	Bayern Munich (Germany)	2–0	(Switzerland) Zürich	Allianz Arena, Munich
20:45	Schweinsteiger 8'; Robben 72'	Report		Attendance: 66,000; Referee: Aleksei Nikolaev (Russia)

23 August 2011 Second leg	Zürich (Switzerland)	0–1	(Germany) Bayern Munich	Letzigrund, Zürich
20:45		Report	Gómez 7'	Attendance: 23,600; Referee: Laurent Duhamel (France)

Bayern Munich won 3–0 on aggregate. Zürich transfer to Europa League group stage

==== Europa League ====
===== Group stage / Group D =====
15 September 2011 Matchday 1	Zürich (Switzerland)	0–2	(Portugal) Sporting CP	Letzigrund, Zürich
19:00		Report	Insúa 4'; Van Wolfswinkel 21'	Attendance: 10,400; Referee: Pol van Boekel (Netherlands)

29 September 2011 Matchday 2	Vaslui (Romania)	2–2	(Switzerland) Zürich	Stadionul Ceahlăul, Piatra Neamț^{2}
21:05	Wesley 62' (pen.); Temwanjera 77'	Report	Alphonse 32'; Mehmedi 79'	Attendance: 3,000; Referee: Menashe Masiah (Israel)

20 October 2011 Matchday 3	Zürich (Switzerland)	1–1	(Italy) Lazio	Letzigrund, Zürich
21:05	Nikçi 23'	Report	Sculli 22'	Attendance: 10,800; Referee: Pawel Gil (Poland)

3 November 2011 Matchday 4	Lazio (Italy)	1–0	(Switzerland) Zürich	Stadio Olimpico, Rome
19:00	Brocchi 62'	Report		Attendance: 13,414; Referee: Michael Koukoulakis (Greece)

1 December 2011 Matchday 5	Sporting CP (Portugal)	2–0	(Switzerland) Zürich	Estádio José Alvalade, Lisbon
21:05	Van Wolfswinkel 15'; Bojinov 58'	Report		Attendance: 25,309; Referee: Peter Rasmussen (Denmark)

14 December 2011 Matchday 6	Zürich (Switzerland)	2–0	(Romania) Vaslui	Letzigrund, Zürich
19:00	Margairaz 69'; Buff 90'	Report		Attendance: 6,200; Referee: Maksim Layushkin (Russia)

Notes

- Note 2: Vaslui played their home matches at Stadionul Ceahlăul, Piatra Neamț as their own Stadionul Municipal did not meet UEFA criteria.

Pos	Team	Pld	W	D	L	GF	GA	GD	Pts	Qualification	SCP	LAZ	VAS	ZÜR
1	(Portugal) Sporting CP	6	4	0	2	8	4	+4	12	Advance to knockout phase	—	2–1	2–0	2–0
2	(Italy) Lazio	6	2	3	1	7	5	+2	9	Advance to knockout phase	2–0	—	2–2	1–0
3	(Romania) Vaslui	6	1	3	2	5	8	−3	6		1–0	0–0	—	2–2
4	(Switzerland) Zürich	6	1	2	3	5	8	−3	5		0–2	1–1	2–0	—

Source: Soccerway

=== Young Boys ===
==== Europa League ====
===== Third qualifying round =====
28 July 2011 First leg	Young Boys (Switzerland)	3–1	(Belgium) Westerlo	Stade de Suisse, Bern
19:30	Farnerud 22'; Degen 33', 79'	Report	Brüls 34'	Attendance: 11,163; Referee: Paolo Silvio Mazzoleni (Italy)

4 August 2011 Second leg	Westerlo (Belgium)	0–2	(Switzerland) Young Boys	Het Kuipje, Westerlo
20:00		Report	Schneuwly 5'; Bienvenu 77'	Attendance: 2,386; Referee: Richard Trutz (Slovakia)

Young Boys won 5–1 on aggregate.

===== Play-off round =====
18 August 2011 First leg	Braga (Portugal)	0–0	(Switzerland) Young Boys	Estádio Municipal de Braga, Braga
22:00		Report		Attendance: 12,457; Referee: Pawel Gil (Poland)

25 August 2011 Second leg	Young Boys (Switzerland)	2–2	(Portugal) Braga	Stade de Suisse, Bern
19:30	Mayuka 61'; Farnerud 81'	Report	Barbosa 24'; Lima 78'	Attendance: 15,012; Referee: Ivan Bebek (Croatia)

2–2 on aggregate. Braga won on away goals.

=== Sion ===
==== Europa League ====
===== Play-off round =====
18 August 2011 Play-off (1st leg)	Celtic F.C.	0–0^{1}	FC Sion	Glasgow
21:05 CEST		Match Report		Stadium: Celtic Park; Attendance: 51,525; Referee: Marijo Strahonja (Croatia)

25 August 2011 Play-off (2nd leg)	FC Sion	3–1^{1} (3–1 agg.)	Celtic F.C.	Sion
20:30 CEST	Feindouno 3' (pen.), 63'; Sio 22'	Match Report	Mulgrew 78'	Stadium: Stade Tourbillon; Referee: David Fernández Borbalán (Spain)

18 August 2011 Play-off (1st leg)	Celtic F.C.	3–0^{1}	FC Sion	Glasgow
21:05 CEST		Match report		Stadium: Celtic Park; Attendance: 10,145; Referee: Marijo Strahonja (Croatia)

25 August 2011 Play-off (2nd leg)	FC Sion	0–3^{1} (0–6 agg.)	Celtic F.C.	Sion
20:30 CEST	Feindouno 3' (pen.), 63'; Sio 22'	Match report	Mulgrew 78'	Stadium: Stade Tourbillon; Referee: David Fernández Borbalán (Spain)

- 1. FC Sion originally drew 0–0 in the first leg and won 3–1 in the second leg. UEFA overturned the result of both matches. Both matches were awarded 3–0 in favour of Celtic F.C.

=== Thun ===
==== Europa League ====
===== Second qualifying round =====
14 July 2011 First leg	Vllaznia Shkodër (Albania)	0–0	(Switzerland) Thun	Loro Boriçi Stadium, Shkodër
20:30		Report		Attendance: 6,000; Referee: Igor Pristovnik (Croatia)

21 July 2011 Second leg	Thun (Switzerland)	2–1	(Albania) Vllaznia Shkodër	Stadion Lachen, Thun
19:30	Rama 89'; Lüthi 90+2'	Report	Sukaj 14'	Attendance: 7,193; Referee: João Ferreira (Portugal)

Thun won 2–1 on aggregate.

===== Third qualifying round =====
28 July 2011 First leg	Palermo (Italy)	2–2	(Switzerland) Thun	Stadio Renzo Barbera, Palermo
20:45	Iličić 13'; Miccoli 90+2'	Report	Lüthi 6'; Schneider 56'	Attendance: 28,760; Referee: Milorad Mažić (Serbia)

4 August 2011 Second leg	Thun (Switzerland)	1–1	(Italy) Palermo	Stadion Lachen, Thun
19:30	Lezcano 65'	Report	González 49'	Attendance: 7,227; Referee: Liran Liany (Israel)

3–3 on aggregate. Thun won on away goals.

===== Play-off round =====
18 August 2011 First leg	Thun (Switzerland)	0–1	(England) Stoke City	Arena Thun, Thun
19:30		Report	Pugh 18'	Attendance: 7,150; Referee: Daniel Stålhammar (Sweden)

25 August 2011 Second leg	Stoke City (England)	4–1	(Switzerland) Thun	Britannia Stadium, Stoke-on-Trent
20:45	Upson 25'; Jones 31', 72'; Whelan 38'	Report	Wittwer 77'	Attendance: 24,118; Referee: Marcin Borski (Poland)

Stoke City won 5–1 on aggregate.

=== Vaduz ===
==== Europa League ====
===== Second qualifying round =====
14 July 2011 First leg	Vaduz (Liechtenstein)	0–2	(Serbia) Vojvodina	Rheinpark Stadion, Vaduz
20:00		Report	Oumarou 60'; Ilić 70'	Attendance: 1,892; Referee: Stavros Tritsonis (Greece)

21 July 2011 Second leg	Vojvodina (Serbia)	1–3	(Liechtenstein) Vaduz	Stadion Karađorđe, Novi Sad
17:00	Čović 88'	Report	Cvetinović 10'; Merenda 78', 90+6'	Attendance: 6,800; Referee: Sergey Tsinkevich (Belarus)

3–3 on aggregate. Vaduz won on away goals.

===== Third qualifying round =====
28 July 2011 First leg	Hapoel Tel Aviv (Israel)	4–0	(Liechtenstein) Vaduz	Bloomfield Stadium, Tel Aviv
19:30	Kende 24'; Tamuz 45+1'; Damari 49'; Cohen 82'	Report		Attendance: 8,822; Referee: Lorenc Jemini (Albania)

4 August 2011 Second leg	Vaduz (Liechtenstein)	2–1	(Israel) Hapoel Tel Aviv	Rheinpark Stadion, Vaduz
20:00	Zanni 78'; Rafinha 81'	Report	Damari 1'	Attendance: 870; Referee: Daniel Stålhammar (Sweden)

Hapoel Tel Aviv won 5–2 on aggregate.

== Sources ==
- Switzerland 2011–12 at RSSSF
- 1. Liga season 2011–12 at the official website
- Cup finals at Fussball-Schweiz
- Josef Zindel (2018). FC Basel 1893. Die ersten 125 Jahre (in German). Basel: Friedrich Reinhardt Verlag. ISBN 978-3-7245-2305-5.

Preceded by 2010–11	Seasons in Swiss football	Succeeded by 2012–13
