= 2013–14 1. Liga Promotion =

1. Liga Promotion
- Season: 2013–14
- Champions: FC Le Mont
- Promoted: FC Le Mont
- Relegated: SC Kriens; AC Bellinzona

The 2013–14 season of the 1. Liga Promotion, the third tier of the Swiss football league system, was the second season of the league. The season started on 3 August 2013 and was completed on 31 May 2014.

== Teams ==
The 2013–14 season saw two new clubs in the league, FC Le Mont and FC Köniz had won promotion from the 1. Liga Classic the previous season. In April 2013 the club AC Bellinzona was declared bankrupt and was withdrawn from the division. Therefore, there was no relegated team from the 2012–13 Swiss Challenge League and so this season's 1. Liga Promotion competition was competed with just 15 teams. The number of U-21 teams was restricted to four.

| Club | Canton | Stadium | Capacity |
|---|---|---|---|
| Basel U-21 | Basel-City | Stadion Rankhof or Youth Campus Basel | 7,000; 1,000 |
| AC Bellinzona | Ticino | Stadio Comunale Bellinzona | 5,000 |
| FC Breitenrain Bern | Bern | Spitalacker | 1,450 |
| SC Brühl | St. Gallen | Paul-Grüninger-Stadion | 4,200 |
| SR Delémont | Jura | La Blancherie | 5,263 |
| Étoile Carouge FC | Geneva | Stade de la Fontenette | 3,690 |
| SC Kriens | Lucerne | Stadion Kleinfeld | 5,100 |
| FC Köniz | Bern | Sportplatz Liebefeld-Hessgut | 2,600 |
| FC Le Mont | Vaud | Centre Sportif du Châtaignier | 2,500 |
| BSC Old Boys | Basel-City | Stadion Schützenmatte | 8,000 |
| Sion U-21 | Valais | Stade de Tourbillon | 20,200 |
| St. Gallen U-21 | St. Gallen | Espenmoos or Kybunpark | 3,000; 19,264 |
| FC Stade Nyonnais | Vaud | Stade de Colovray | 7,200 |
| FC Tuggen | Schwyz | Linthstrasse | 2,800 |
| SC YF Juventus | Zürich | Utogrund | 2,850 |
| Zürich U-21 | Zürich | Sportplatz Heerenschürli | 1,120 |

The league was won by Football-Club Le Mont-sur-Lausanne and they won promotion to the following Challenge League season. SC Kriens ended the season in 15th position and suffered relegation.

== Final league table ==
| Pos | Team | Pld | W | D | L | GF | GA | GD | Pts | Qualification or relegation |
|---|---|---|---|---|---|---|---|---|---|---|
| 1 | FC Le Mont | 28 | 16 | 5 | 7 | 49 | 36 | +13 | 53 | Promotion to Challenge League |
| 2 | SC Young Fellows Juventus | 28 | 15 | 4 | 9 | 54 | 33 | +21 | 49 | |
| 3 | Étoile Carouge FC | 28 | 15 | 4 | 9 | 71 | 54 | +17 | 49 | |
| 4 | FC Köniz | 28 | 13 | 10 | 5 | 48 | 31 | +17 | 49 | |
| 5 | FC Tuggen | 28 | 14 | 4 | 10 | 63 | 52 | +11 | 46 | |
| 6 | SR Delémont | 28 | 12 | 5 | 11 | 40 | 43 | −3 | 41 | |
| 7 | Zürich U-21 | 28 | 11 | 7 | 10 | 38 | 39 | −1 | 40 | |
| 8 | Basel U-21 | 28 | 10 | 7 | 11 | 38 | 41 | −3 | 37 | |
| 9 | Sion U-21 | 28 | 11 | 4 | 13 | 45 | 52 | −7 | 37 | |
| 10 | SC Brühl | 28 | 10 | 6 | 12 | 35 | 45 | −10 | 36 | |
| 11 | FC Stade Nyonnais | 28 | 10 | 5 | 13 | 36 | 48 | −12 | 35 | |
| 12 | FC Breitenrain Bern | 28 | 9 | 7 | 12 | 41 | 40 | +1 | 34 | |
| 13 | Old Boys | 28 | 9 | 3 | 16 | 50 | 55 | −5 | 30 | |
| 14 | St. Gallen U-21 | 28 | 5 | 10 | 13 | 28 | 43 | −15 | 25 | |
| 15 | SC Kriens | 28 | 6 | 7 | 15 | 38 | 62 | −24 | 25 | Relegation to 1. Liga (4th tier) |
| 16 | AC Bellinzona | 0 | 0 | 0 | 0 | 0 | 0 | 0 | 0 | Relegation to 2. Liga (6th tier) |

Source: RSSSF
Rules for classification: 1) points; 2) goal difference; 3) number of goals scored; 4) head-to-head points; 5) draw

== Sources ==
- Josef Zindel (2018). FC Basel 1893. Die ersten 125 Jahre (in German). Basel: Friedrich Reinhardt Verlag. ISBN 978-3-7245-2305-5.
- Switzerland 2013/14 at RSSSF
