= Sandy Maendly =

Swiss footballer (born 1988)

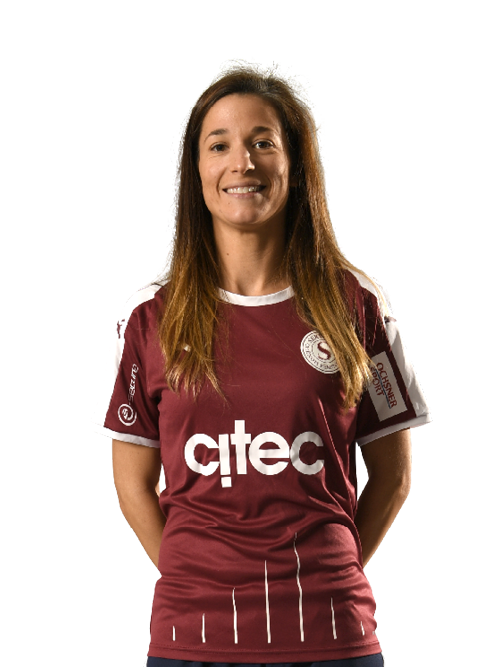

Personal information
- Full name: Sandy Maendly
- Date of birth: 4 April 1988 (age 38)
- Place of birth: Switzerland
- Height: 1.68 m (5 ft 6 in)
- Position: Striker

Team information
- Current team: Servette
- Number: 8

Senior career*
Years	Team	Apps	(Gls)
2002–2004	Signal FC		
2004–2006	Servette		
2006–2011	YB Frauen	80	(17)
2011–2014	Torres CF	10	(1)
2014–2016	AGSM Verona		
2016–2017	FC Neunkirch		
2017–2018	Madrid CFF		
2018–	Servette		

International career
2006–	Switzerland	84	(12)
- * Club domestic league appearances and goals

Sandy Maendly (born 4 April 1988) is a Swiss football midfielder, currently playing for Servette Chênois in Swiss Challenge League. She previously played for AGSM Verona and Torres CF in Italy's Serie A and for YB Frauen and Servette Chênois in Switzerland's Nationalliga A.

She is a member of the Swiss national team.
