= 2015–16 FC Luzern season =

FC Luzern
- Chairman: Rudolf Stäger
- Manager: Markus Babbel
- Stadium: swissporarena
- Swiss Super League: 3rd
- Swiss Cup: Semi-finals
- Top goalscorer: League: Marco Schneuwly (16); All: Marco Schneuwly (22)
- Average home league attendance: 11,292
Home colours	Away colours

The 2015–16 season was the 91st season in the history of Fussball-Club Luzern and the club's tenth consecutive season in the top flight of Swiss football.

== Players ==
=== First-team squad ===
Note: Flags indicate national team as defined under FIFA eligibility rules; some limited exceptions apply. Players may hold more than one non-FIFA nationality.

No.	Pos.	Nation	Player
1	GK	SUI	David Zibung
4	DF	GER	Sebastian Schachten
5	DF	CRO	Kaja Rogulj
7	DF	SUI	Claudio Lustenberger
8	MF	ALB	Jahmir Hyka
9	FW	SUI	Michael Frey (on loan from OSC Lille)
10	MF	AUT	Jakob Jantscher
13	DF	CRO	Tomislav Puljić
14	DF	SUI	Jérôme Thiesson
15	FW	SUI	Marco Schneuwly
16	DF	SUI	François Affolter
18	GK	ITA	Lorenzo Bucchi
19	MF	CRO	Frane Čirjak

No.	Pos.	Nation	Player
20	MF	SUI	Christian Schneuwly
23	DF	FRA	Sally Sarr
27	MF	GER	Nico Brandenburger (on loan from Borussia Mönchengladbach)
28	MF	GER	Clemens Fandrich
31	MF	ALB	Hekuran Kryeziu
32	MF	SUI	Nicolas Haas
35	DF	SUI	Yannick Schmid
37	FW	SUI	João de Oliveira
39	MF	SUI	Remo Arnold
47	DF	ALB	Ferid Matri
61	FW	GER	Samed Yeşil (on loan from Liverpool)
77	MF	GER	Markus Neumayr

=== Out on loan ===
Note: Flags indicate national team as defined under FIFA eligibility rules; some limited exceptions apply. Players may hold more than one non-FIFA nationality.

No.	Pos.	Nation	Player
11	MF	ALB	Migjen Basha (at Calcio Como until 30 June 2016)
17	MF	SUI	Claudio Holenstein (at FC Winterthur until 30 June 2016)
20	FW	ROU	Cristian Ianu (at FC Wohlen until 30 June 2016)
30	GK	SUI	Jonas Omlin (at FC Le Mont LS until 30 June 2016)

No.	Pos.	Nation	Player
36	FW	SUI	Omar Thali (at SC Kriens until 30 June 2016)
38	DF	SUI	Olivier Kleiner (at FC Wohlen until 30 June 2016)
93	FW	ALB	Haxhi Neziraj (at FC Schaffhausen until 30 June 2016)

== Pre-season and friendlies ==
Win Draw Loss

20 June 2015 Friendly	Luzern (Switzerland)	3–0	(Switzerland) Wil	Switzerland
16:00 CEST (UTC+2)		Report

27 June 2015 Friendly	Luzern (Switzerland)	2–1	(Switzerland) Schaffhausen	Switzerland
16:00 CEST (UTC+2)		Report

3 July 2015 Friendly	Luzern (Switzerland)	2–1	(Russia) Spartak Moscow	Switzerland
19:00 CEST (UTC+2)		Report

7 July 2015 Friendly	Luzern (Switzerland)	3–0	(Switzerland) Winterthur	Switzerland
18:35 CEST (UTC+2)		Report

13 July 2015 Friendly	Biel-Bienne (Switzerland)	1–0	(Switzerland) Luzern	Switzerland
19:00 CEST (UTC+2)		Report

21 July 2015 Friendly	Luzern (Switzerland)	1–4	(Germany) Borussia Dortmund	Lucerne, Switzerland
19:30 CEST (UTC+2)	Cirjak 70'	Report	Reus 10'; Kampl 22'; Hummels 51'; Leitner 69'	Stadium: swissporarena Attendance: 12,258; Referee: Nikolaj Hänni

4 September 2015 Friendly	Luzern (Switzerland)	5–1	(Germany) 1. FC Kaiserslautern	Switzerland
17:30 CEST (UTC+2)		Report

13 November 2015 Friendly	Luzern (Switzerland)	1–2	Austria Lustenau	Switzerland
14:30 CET (UTC+1)		Report

13 January 2016 Friendly	Luzern (Switzerland)	2–2	(Switzerland) Schaffhausen	Switzerland
15:00 CET (UTC+1)		Report

16 January 2016 Friendly	Greuther Fürth (Germany)	0–1	(Switzerland) Luzern	Switzerland
16:00 CET (UTC+1)		Report

18 January 2016 Friendly	SC Freiburg (Germany)	1–1	(Switzerland) Luzern	Switzerland
16:00 CET (UTC+1)		Report

21 January 2016 Friendly	Luzern (Switzerland)	1–2	(Ukraine) Dynamo Kyiv	Switzerland
16:00 CET (UTC+1)		Report

27 January 2016 Friendly	Luzern (Switzerland)	0–1	(Switzerland) Wohlen	Switzerland
15:00 CET (UTC+1)		Report

17 May 2016 Friendly	Luzern (Switzerland)	1–6	(Germany) Borussia Mönchengladbach	Lucerne, Switzerland
17:45 CEST (UTC+2)		Report		Stadium: swissporarena

== Competitions ==
=== Overall record ===
Competition	First match	Last match	Starting round	Final position	Record							
Competition	First match	Last match	Starting round	Final position	Pld	W	D	L	GF	GA	GD	Win %
Swiss Super League	18 July 2015	25 May 2016	Matchday 1	3rd	36	15	9	12	59	50	+9	41.67
Swiss Cup	16 August 2015	2 March 2016	Round 1	Semi-finals	5	4	0	1	17	11	+6	80.00
Total					41	19	9	13	76	61	+15	46.34

Source: Competitions

=== Swiss Super League ===
==== League table ====
Pos	Team	Pld	W	D	L	GF	GA	GD	Pts	Qualification or relegation
1	Basel (C)	36	26	5	5	88	38	+50	83	Qualification for the Champions League group stage
2	Young Boys	36	20	9	7	78	47	+31	69	Qualification for the Champions League third qualifying round
3	Luzern	36	15	9	12	59	50	+9	54	Qualification for the Europa League third qualifying round
4	Grasshopper	36	15	8	13	65	56	+9	53	Qualification for the Europa League second qualifying round
5	Sion	36	14	8	14	52	49	+3	50	

Source: Swiss Super League, Soccerway
Rules for classification: 1) Points; 2) Goal difference; 3) Goals scored; 4) Head-to-head points 5) Draw.
(C) Champions

==== Results summary ====
Overall								Home						Away					
Pld	W	D	L	GF	GA	GD	Pts	W	D	L	GF	GA	GD	W	D	L	GF	GA	GD
36	15	9	12	59	50	+9	54	8	5	5	36	23	+13	7	4	7	23	27	−4

Source: Swiss Super League

==== Results by round ====
Round	1	2	3	4	5	6	7	8	9	10	11	12	13	14	15	16	17	18	19	20	21	22	23	24	25	26	27	28	29	30	31	32	33	34	35	36
Ground	H	A	A	H	H	A	A	H	A	H	H	A	H	A	A	H	A	H	A	H	H	A	A	H	A	H	A	A	H	H	A	A	H	H	A	H
Result	D	D	W	L	L	W	W	D	W	W	D	L	D	L	L	W	L	W	L	L	L	L	L	W	D	W	D	W	L	W	D	W	W	W	W	D
Position																																				

Source: Swiss Super League
A = Away; H = Home; W = Win; D = Draw; L = Loss

==== Matches ====
18 July 2015 Round 1	Luzern	2–2	Sion	Lucerne
17:45 CEST (UTC+2)		Report		Stadium: swissporarena Attendance: 10,116; Referee: (Switzerland) Stephan Klossner

25 July 2015 Round 2	Young Boys	1–1	Luzern	Bern
17:45 CEST (UTC+2)		Report		Stadium: Stade de Suisse; Attendance: 16,865; Referee: (Switzerland) Nikolaj Hänni

2 August 2015 Round 3	Thun	0–1	Luzern	Thun
13:45 CEST (UTC+2)		Report	Lezcano 89'	Stadium: Stockhorn Arena; Attendance: 6,527; Referee: (Switzerland) Sébastien Pache

8 August 2015 Round 4	Luzern	1 – 3	Basel	Swissporarena, Luzern
20:00	Lezcano 3' (1:0); Sarr (yellow card) 50'; Jantscher (yellow card) 78'	FCB summary	27' (1:1) Embolo; (yellow card) 29' Bjarnason; 33' (1:2) Embolo; (yellow card) 43' Safari; (yellow card) 53' Degen; (yellow card) 76' Callà; (yellow card) 78' Embolo; 90' (1:3) Delgado	Attendance: 14,748; Referee: (Switzerland) Sandro Schärer

12 August 2015 Round 5	Luzern	0–1	St. Gallen	Lucerne
20:30 CEST (UTC+2)				Stadium: swissporarena

22 August 2015 Round 6	Zürich	2–5	Luzern	Zürich
20:00 CEST (UTC+2)				Stadium: Stadion Letzigrund

29 August 2015 Round 7	Lugano	0–1	Luzern	Lugano
17:45 CEST (UTC+2)				Stadium: Cornaredo Stadium

13 September 2015 Round 8	Luzern	3–3	Grasshopper	Lucerne
13:45 CEST (UTC+2)				Stadium: swissporarena

23 September 2015 Round 9	Vaduz	1–2	Luzern	Vaduz
19:45 CEST (UTC+2)				Stadium: Rheinpark Stadion

27 September 2015 Round 10	Luzern	1–0	Zürich	Lucerne
16:00 CEST (UTC+2)				Stadium: swissporarena

3 October 2015 Round 11	Luzern	2–2	Lugano	Lucerne
20:00 CEST (UTC+2)				Stadium: swissporarena

17 October 2015 Round 12	Grasshopper	1–0	Luzern	Zürich
17:45 CEST (UTC+2)				Stadium: Stadion Letzigrund

24 October 2015 Round 13	Luzern	1–1	Vaduz	Lucerne
17:45 CEST (UTC+2)				Stadium: swissporarena

1 November 2015 Round 14	St. Gallen	1–0	Luzern	St. Gallen
16:00 CET (UTC+1)				Stadium: AFG Arena

8 November 2015 Round 15	Sion	2–0	Luzern	Sion
13:45 CET (UTC+1)				Stadium: Stade de Tourbillon

21 November 2015 Round 16	Luzern	1–0	Thun	Lucerne
20:00 CET (UTC+1)				Stadium: swissporarena

29 November 2015 Round 17	Basel	3 – 0	Luzern	St. Jakob-Park, Basel
13:45	Bjarnason 7' (1:0); Bjarnason (yellow card) 25'; Callà 26' (2:0); Elneny 32' (3:0); Elneny (yellow card) 84'; Zuffi (yellow card) 90+2'	FCB summary	(yellow card) 1' Lezcano; (yellow card) 30' Affolter; (yellow card) 58' Basha; (yellow card) 84' Lustenberger; (yellow card) 90' Freuler	Attendance: 29,691; Referee: (Switzerland) Stephan Klossner

5 December 2015 Round 18	Luzern	3–1	Young Boys	Lucerne
20:00 CET (UTC+1)				Stadium: swissporarena

7 February 2016 Round 19	Basel	3 – 0	Luzern	St. Jakob-Park, Basel
16:00	Safari (yellow card) 43'; Bjarnason 50' (1:0); Delgado 72' (2:0); Steffen 85' (3:0); Steffen (yellow card) 90+1'	FCB summary	(yellow card) 67' Jantscher; (yellow card) 82' Lustenberger; (yellow card) 90+2' Rogulj	Attendance: 25,821; Referee: (Switzerland) Sandro Schärer

14 February 2016 Round 20	Luzern	1–2	Zürich	Lucerne
16:00 CET (UTC+1)				Stadium: swissporarena

21 February 2016 Round 21	Luzern	0–1	St. Gallen	Lucerne
16:00 CET (UTC+1)				Stadium: swissporarena

27 February 2016 Round 22	Sion	3–1	Luzern	Sion
17:45 CET (UTC+1)				Stadium: Stade de Tourbillon

6 March 2016 Round 23	Young Boys	5–2	Luzern	Bern
16:00 CET (UTC+1)				Stadium: Stade de Suisse

12 March 2016 Round 24	Luzern	2–1	Lugano	Lucerne
20:00 CET (UTC+1)				Stadium: swissporarena

19 March 2016 Round 25	Thun	1–1	Luzern	Thun
17:45 CET (UTC+1)				Stadium: Stockhorn Arena

2 April 2016 Round 26	Luzern	5–1	Vaduz	Lucerne
17:45 CEST (UTC+2)				Stadium: swissporarena

9 April 2016 Round 27	Grasshopper	1–1	Luzern	Zürich
20:00 CEST (UTC+2)				Stadium: Stadion Letzigrund

16 April 2016 Round 28	Zürich	0–1	Luzern	Zürich
20:00 CEST (UTC+2)				Stadium: Stadion Letzigrund

20 April 2016 Round 29	Luzern	2–3	Young Boys	Lucerne
20:30 CEST (UTC+2)				Stadium: swissporarena

24 April 2016 Round 30	Luzern	3–0	Thun	Lucerne
13:45 CEST (UTC+2)				Stadium: swissporarena

1 May 2016 Round 31	Lugano	1–1	Luzern	Lugano
16:00 CEST (UTC+2)				Stadium: Stadio di Cornaredo

8 May 2016 Round 32	Vaduz	1–2	Luzern	Vaduz
13:45 CEST (UTC+2)				Stadium: Rheinpark Stadion

11 May 2016 Round 33	Luzern	3–0	Grasshopper	Lucerne
19:45 CEST (UTC+2)				Stadium: swissporarena

16 May 2016 Round 34	Luzern	4 – 0	Basel	Swissporarena, Luzern
16:00	Schneuwly 7' (1:0); Jantscher 10' (2:0); Hyka 48' (3:0); Affolter (yellow card) 56'; Haas 60' (4:0)	FCB summary	(yellow card) 79' Steffen; (yellow card) 85' Aliji	Attendance: 16,500; Referee: (Switzerland) Sandro Schärer

22 May 2016 Round 35	St. Gallen	1–4	Luzern	St. Gallen
16:00 CEST (UTC+2)				Stadium: AFG Arena

25 May 2016 Round 36	Luzern	2–2	Sion	Lucerne
20:30 CEST (UTC+2)				Stadium: swissporarena

== Statistics ==
=== Goalscorers ===
Rank	No.	Pos.	Nat.	Name	Super League	Swiss Cup	Total
1	15	FW	(Switzerland)	Marco Schneuwly	16	6	22
2	17	FW	(Paraguay)	Dario Lezcano	9	1	10
3	10	MF	(Austria)	Jakob Jantscher	6	2	8
Totals					59	17	76
