= 2016–17 FC Luzern season =

FC Luzern
- Chairman: Rudolf Stäger
- Manager: Markus Babbel
- Stadium: swissporarena
- Swiss Super League: 5th
- Swiss Cup: Semi-finals
- Top goalscorer: League: Marco Schneuwly (14); All: Marco Schneuwly (21)
- Average home league attendance: 10,955
Home colours	Away colours

The 2016–17 season was the 92nd season in the history of Fussball-Club Luzern and the club's 11th consecutive season in the top flight of Swiss football.

== Players ==
=== First-team squad ===
Note: Flags indicate national team as defined under FIFA eligibility rules; some limited exceptions apply. Players may hold more than one non-FIFA nationality.

No.	Pos.	Nation	Player
1	GK	SUI	David Zibung
4	DF	GER	Sebastian Schachten
5	DF	CRO	Kaja Rogulj
7	DF	SUI	Claudio Lustenberger
9	FW	SUI	Michael Frey (on loan from OSC Lille)
10	MF	AUT	Jakob Jantscher
13	DF	CRO	Tomislav Puljić
14	DF	SUI	Jérôme Thiesson
15	FW	SUI	Marco Schneuwly
16	DF	SUI	François Affolter
18	GK	ITA	Lorenzo Bucchi
19	MF	CRO	Frane Čirjak

No.	Pos.	Nation	Player
20	MF	SUI	Christian Schneuwly
23	DF	FRA	Sally Sarr
27	MF	GER	Nico Brandenburger (on loan from Borussia Mönchengladbach)
28	MF	GER	Clemens Fandrich
31	MF	KOS	Hekuran Kryeziu
32	MF	SUI	Nicolas Haas
35	DF	SUI	Yannick Schmid
37	FW	SUI	João de Oliveira
39	MF	SUI	Remo Arnold
47	DF	ALB	Ferid Matri
61	FW	GER	Samed Yeşil (on loan from Liverpool)
77	MF	GER	Markus Neumayr

=== Out on loan ===
Note: Flags indicate national team as defined under FIFA eligibility rules; some limited exceptions apply. Players may hold more than one non-FIFA nationality.

No.	Pos.	Nation	Player
11	MF	ALB	Migjen Basha (at Calcio Como until 30 June 2016)
17	MF	SUI	Claudio Holenstein (at FC Winterthur until 30 June 2016)
20	FW	ROU	Cristian Ianu (at FC Wohlen until 30 June 2016)
30	GK	SUI	Jonas Omlin (at FC Le Mont LS until 30 June 2016)

No.	Pos.	Nation	Player
36	FW	SUI	Omar Thali (at SC Kriens until 30 June 2016)
38	DF	SUI	Olivier Kleiner (at FC Wohlen until 30 June 2016)
93	FW	ALB	Haxhi Neziraj (at FC Schaffhausen until 30 June 2016)

== Pre-season and friendlies ==
Win Draw Loss

25 June 2016 Friendly	Luzern (Switzerland)	2–4	(Switzerland) Winterthur	Switzerland
18:00 CEST (UTC+2)		Report

2 July 2016 Friendly	Luzern (Switzerland)	1–1	Austria Lustenau	Switzerland
16:00 CEST (UTC+2)		Report

9 July 2016 Friendly	Luzern (Switzerland)	1–0	(Germany) 1. FC Kaiserslautern	Switzerland
18:00 CEST (UTC+2)		Report

12 July 2016 Friendly	Luzern (Switzerland)	2–1	(France) Monaco	Chavannes-près-Renens, Switzerland
17:30 CEST (UTC+2)		Report		Stadium: Stade du Censuy

16 July 2016 Friendly	Luzern (Switzerland)	4–2	(Germany) Schalke 04	Lucerne, Switzerland
18:30 CEST (UTC+2)	Neumayr 2' (pen.); M. Schneuwly 47', 54'; Oliveira 89'	Report	Huntelaar 66'; Nastasić 76'	Stadium: swissporarena Attendance: 5,191; Referee: Alain Bieri

19 July 2016 Friendly	Luzern (Switzerland)	1–2	(Switzerland) Schaffhausen	Switzerland
19:00 CEST (UTC+2)		Report

6 October 2016 Friendly	Union Berlin (Germany)	1–0	(Switzerland) Luzern	Berlin, Germany
18:30 CEST (UTC+2)		Report		Stadium: An der Alten Försterei; Attendance: 766; Referee: Daniel Siebert (Germany)

12 January 2017 Friendly	Wil (Switzerland)	0–2	(Switzerland) Luzern	Switzerland
14:30 CET (UTC+1)		Report

14 January 2017 Friendly	Karlsruher SC (Germany)	1–0	(Switzerland) Luzern	Germany
15:00 CET (UTC+1)		Report

== Competitions ==
=== Overall record ===
Competition	First match	Last match	Starting round	Final position	Record							
Competition	First match	Last match	Starting round	Final position	Pld	W	D	L	GF	GA	GD	Win %
Swiss Super League	23 July 2016	2 June 2017	Matchday 1	5th	36	14	8	14	62	66	−4	38.89
Swiss Cup	10 August 2016	5 April 2017	Round 1	Semi-finals	5	3	2	0	13	5	+8	60.00
UEFA Europa League	28 July 2016	4 August 2016	Third qualifying round	Third qualifying round	2	0	1	1	1	4	−3	0.00
Total					43	17	11	15	76	75	+1	39.53

Source: Competitions

=== Swiss Super League ===
==== League table ====
Pos	Team	Pld	W	D	L	GF	GA	GD	Pts	Qualification or relegation
3	Lugano	36	15	8	13	52	61	−9	53	Qualification for the Europa League group stage (Note: Since the winners of the 2016–17 Swiss Cup, Basel, qualified for European competition based on league position, the spot awarded to the Swiss Cup winners (Europa League group stage) was passed to the third-placed team, the spot awarded to the third-placed team was passed to the fourth-placed team, and the spot awarded to the fourth-placed team was passed to the fifth-placed team.)
4	Sion	36	15	6	15	60	55	+5	51	Qualification for the Europa League third qualifying round
5	Luzern	36	14	8	14	62	66	−4	50	Qualification for the Europa League second qualifying round
6	Thun	36	11	12	13	58	63	−5	45	
7	St. Gallen	36	11	8	17	43	57	−14	41	

Source: Swiss Super League, Soccerway
Rules for classification: 1) Points; 2) Goal difference; 3) Goals scored; 4) Head-to-head points; 5) Draw.

==== Results summary ====
Overall								Home						Away					
Pld	W	D	L	GF	GA	GD	Pts	W	D	L	GF	GA	GD	W	D	L	GF	GA	GD
36	14	8	14	62	66	−4	50	7	6	5	33	26	+7	7	2	9	29	40	−11

Source: Swiss Super League

==== Results by round ====
Round	1	2	3	4	5	6	7	8	9	10	11	12	13	14	15	16	17	18	19	20	21	22	23	24	25	26	27	28	29	30	31	32	33	34	35	36
Ground	A	H	H	A	H	A	A	H	H	A	A	H	A	H	H	A	H	A	A	H	H	A	H	A	H	H	A	H	A	H	A	A	H	A	H	A
Result	W	W	L	W	W	L	L	D	L	L	L	W	W	D	W	W	W	L	D	W	D	L	D	D	D	L	W	W	L	L	L	L	L	W	D	W
Position	4	2	3	2	2	2	3	3	5	7																										

Source: World Football
A = Away; H = Home; W = Win; D = Draw; L = Loss

==== Matches ====
23 July 2016 Round 1	Lugano	1–2	Luzern	Lugano
17:45 CEST (UTC+2)				Stadium: Cornaredo Stadium

31 July 2016 Round 2	Luzern	4–3	Grasshopper	Lucerne
16:00 CEST (UTC+2)				Stadium: swissporarena

7 August 2016 Round 3	Luzern	2–3	Basel	Swissporarena, Luzern
13:45	Hyka 18' (1:1); Hyka 29' (2:1); Kryeziu (yellow card) 33'	FCB summary	4' (0:1) Suchý; (yellow card) 20' Xhaka; 70' (2:2) Janko; 74' (2:3) Janko	Attendance: 14,486; Referee: (Switzerland) Fedayi San (Gebenstorf)

10 August 2016 Round 4	Vaduz	1–3	Luzern	Vaduz
19:45 CEST (UTC+2)				Stadium: Rheinpark Stadion

21 August 2016 Round 5	Luzern	3–0	Thun	Lucerne
13:45 CEST (UTC+2)				Stadium: swissporarena

28 August 2016 Round 6	St. Gallen	3–0	Luzern	St. Gallen
13:45 CEST (UTC+2)				Stadium: AFG Arena

10 September 2016 Round 7	Young Boys	2–1	Luzern	Bern
20:00 CEST (UTC+2)				Stadium: Stade de Suisse

21 September 2016 Round 8	Luzern	2–2	Sion	Lucerne
19:45 CEST (UTC+2)				Stadium: swissporarena

24 September 2016 Round 9	Luzern	1–3	Lausanne-Sport	Lucerne
17:45 CEST (UTC+2)				Stadium: swissporarena

2 October 2016 Round 10	Grasshopper	3–2	Luzern	Zürich
16:00 CEST (UTC+2)				Stadium: Stadion Letzigrund

15 October 2016 Round 11	Basel	3–0	Luzern	St. Jakob-Park, Basel
20:00	Doumbia 25' (1:0); Lang 55' (2:0); Elyounoussi 89' (3:0)	FCB summary	(yellow card) 68' Lustenberger	Attendance: 27,261; Referee: (Switzerland) Stephan Klossner

23 October 2016 Round 12	Luzern	3–0	St. Gallen	Lucerne
16:00 CEST (UTC+2)				Stadium: swissporarena

30 October 2016 Round 13	Lausanne-Sport	2–3	Luzern	Lausanne
13:45 CET (UTC+1)				Stadium: Stade Olympique de la Pontaise

6 November 2016 Round 14	Luzern	2–2	Young Boys	Lucerne
16:00 CET (UTC+1)				Stadium: swissporarena

20 November 2016 Round 15	Luzern	2–1	Lugano	Lucerne
16:00 CET (UTC+1)				Stadium: swissporarena

26 November 2016 Round 16	Thun	1–2	Luzern	Thun
17:45 CET (UTC+1)				Stadium: Stockhorn Arena

3 December 2016 Round 17	Luzern	3–0	Vaduz	Lucerne
17:45 CET (UTC+1)				Stadium: swissporarena

11 December 2016 Round 18	Sion	3–1	Luzern	Sion
13:45 CET (UTC+1)				Stadium: Stade de Tourbillon

5 February 2017 Round 19	Lausanne-Sport	4–4	Luzern	Lausanne
13:45 CET (UTC+1)				Stadium: Stade olympique de la Pontaise

12 February 2017 Round 20	Luzern	4–1	Young Boys	Lucerne
16:00 CET (UTC+1)				Stadium: swissporarena

18 February 2017 Round 21	Luzern	1–1	Thun	Lucerne
17:45 CET (UTC+1)				Stadium: swissporarena

26 February 2017 Round 22	Basel	3–1	Luzern	St. Jakob-Park, Basel
13:45	Suchý 19' (1:0); Janko 34' (2:0); Steffen (yellow card) 67'; Janko 81' (3:1)	FCB summary	(yellow card) 19' Grether; 36' (2:1) Affolter; (yellow card) 75' Neumayr; (yellow card) 76' Itten	Attendance: 24,894; Referee: (Switzerland) Nikolaj Hänni (Gams SG)

5 March 2017 Round 23	Luzern	1–1	Grasshopper	Lucerne
16:00 CET (UTC+1)				Stadium: swissporarena

11 March 2017 Round 24	St. Gallen	1–1	Luzern	St. Gallen
20:00 CET (UTC+1)				Stadium: AFG Arena

18 March 2017 Round 25	Luzern	0–0	Sion	Lucerne
17:45 CET (UTC+1)				Stadium: swissporarena

2 April 2017 Round 26	Luzern	0–2	Lugano	Lucerne
13:45 CEST (UTC+2)				Stadium: swissporarena

9 April 2017 Round 27	Vaduz	0–2	Luzern	Vaduz
13:45 CEST (UTC+2)				Stadium: Rheinpark Stadion

17 April 2017 Round 28	Luzern	2–0	St. Gallen	Lucerne
16:00 CEST (UTC+2)				Stadium: swissporarena

22 April 2017 Round 29	Grasshopper	4–1	Luzern	Zürich
17:45 CEST (UTC+2)				Stadium: Stadion Letzigrund

28 April 2017 Round 30	Luzern	1–2	Basel	Swissporarena, Luzern
19:45	Costa (yellow card) 41'; M. Schneuwly 88' (1:2)	FCB summary	3' (0:1) Doumbia; (yellow card) 36' Traoré; 71' (0:2) Steffen; (yellow card) 76' Suchý	Attendance: 14,823; Referee: (Switzerland) Fedayi San (Gebenstorf)

6 May 2017 Round 31	Thun	3–1	Luzern	Thun
17:45 CEST (UTC+2)				Stadium: Stockhorn Arena

14 May 2017 Round 32	Young Boys	4–1	Luzern	Bern
16:00 CEST (UTC+2)				Stadium: Stade de Suisse

17 May 2017 Round 33	Luzern	0–3	Lausanne-Sport	Lucerne
19:45 CEST (UTC+2)				Stadium: swissporarena

21 May 2017 Round 34	Sion	2–3	Luzern	Sion
13:45 CET (UTC+1)		Report		Stadium: Stade de Tourbillon; Attendance: 10,000; Referee: (Switzerland) Alain Bieri

28 May 2017 Round 35	Luzern	2–2	Vaduz	Lucerne
16:00 CEST (UTC+2)		Report		Stadium: swissporarena Attendance: 11,165; Referee: (Switzerland) Sascha Amhof

2 June 2017 Round 36	Lugano	0–1	Luzern	Lugano
20:30 CEST (UTC+2)		Report		Stadium: Cornaredo Stadium; Attendance: 6,250; Referee: (Switzerland) Alain Bieri

=== Swiss Cup ===
13 August 2016 First round	FC Oberwallis Naters	1–4	Luzern	Sportanlage Stapfen
17:00	Chihadeh 49'	SFV summary	4' Oliveira; 43', 81', 85' Schneuwly

=== Europa League qualifying ===
Third qualifying round

28 July 2016	Luzern (Switzerland)	1–1	(Italy) Sassuolo	Swissporarena, Lucerne
19:45	M. Schneuwly 8'	Report	Berardi 42' (pen.)	Attendance: 10,555; Referee: Andreas Ekberg (Sweden)

4 August 2016	Sassuolo (Italy)	3–0	(Switzerland) Luzern	Mapei Stadium – Città del Tricolore, Reggio Emilia
20:30	Berardi 19', 39' (pen.); Defrel 64'	Report		Attendance: 13,415; Referee: Ali Palabıyık (Turkey)

Sassuolo won 4–1 on aggregate.
