= 2014–15 FC Luzern season =

FC Luzern
- Chairman: Rudolf Stäger
- Manager: Carlos Bernegger; Markus Babbel (from 12 October)
- Stadium: swissporarena
- Swiss Super League: 5th
- Swiss Cup: Round 3
- UEFA Europa League: Second qualifying round
- Top goalscorer: League: Marco Schneuwly (17); All: Marco Schneuwly (19)
- Average home league attendance: 10,923
Home colours	Away colours

The 2014–15 season was the 90th season in the history of Fussball-Club Luzern and the club's ninth consecutive season in the top flight of Swiss football.

== Pre-season and friendlies ==
Win Draw Loss

21 June 2014 Friendly	Luzern (Switzerland)	1–0	(Switzerland) Winterthur	Switzerland
16:00 CEST (UTC+2)		Report

28 June 2014 Friendly	Luzern (Switzerland)	3–1	(Switzerland) Schaffhausen	Switzerland
16:00 CEST (UTC+2)		Report

2 July 2014 Friendly	Luzern (Switzerland)	4–3	(Switzerland) Wil	Switzerland
19:00 CEST (UTC+2)		Report

5 July 2014 Friendly	Luzern (Switzerland)	2–0	(Russia) Spartak Moscow	Switzerland
16:00 CEST (UTC+2)		Report

12 July 2014 Friendly	Luzern (Switzerland)	4–1	(Switzerland) Biel-Bienne	Switzerland
16:00 CEST (UTC+2)		Report

12 January 2015 Friendly	Wil (Switzerland)	1–4	(Switzerland) Luzern	Switzerland
14:30 CET (UTC+1)		Report

17 January 2015 Friendly	FC Ingolstadt (Germany)	0–1	(Switzerland) Luzern	San Pedro de Alcántara, Spain
16:00 CET (UTC+1)		Report		Stadium: Marbella Football Center

== Competitions ==
=== Overall record ===
Competition	First match	Last match	Starting round	Final position	Record							
Competition	First match	Last match	Starting round	Final position	Pld	W	D	L	GF	GA	GD	Win %
Swiss Super League	20 July 2014	18 May 2015	Matchday 1	5th	36	12	11	13	54	46	+8	33.33
Swiss Cup	24 August 2014	29 October 2014	Round 1	Round 3	3	2	0	1	15	5	+10	66.67
UEFA Europa League	17 July 2014	24 July 2014	Second qualifying round	Second qualifying round	2	0	2	0	2	2	+0	0.00
Total					41	14	13	14	71	53	+18	34.15

Source: Competitions

=== Swiss Super League ===
==== League table ====
Pos	Team	Pld	W	D	L	GF	GA	GD	Pts	Qualification or relegation
3	Zürich	36	15	8	13	55	48	+7	53	Qualification for the Europa League third qualifying round
4	Thun	36	13	13	10	47	45	+2	52	Qualification for the Europa League second qualifying round
5	Luzern	36	12	11	13	54	46	+8	47	
6	St. Gallen	36	13	8	15	57	65	−8	47	
7	Sion	36	12	9	15	47	48	−1	45	Qualification for the Europa League group stage (Note: Sion qualified for the UEFA Europa League group stage by winning the 2014–15 Swiss Cup.)

Source: Swiss Super League
Rules for classification: 1) points; 2) goal difference; 3) number of goals scored

==== Results summary ====
Overall								Home						Away					
Pld	W	D	L	GF	GA	GD	Pts	W	D	L	GF	GA	GD	W	D	L	GF	GA	GD
36	12	11	13	54	46	+8	47	5	8	5	25	19	+6	7	3	8	29	27	+2

Source: Swiss Super League

==== Results by round ====
Round	1	2	3	4	5	6	7	8	9	10	11	12	13	14	15	16	17	18	19	20	21	22	23	24	25	26	27	28	29	30	31	32	33	34	35	36
Ground	H	A	A	H	A	H	H	A	A	H	A	H	H	A	H	A	A	H	H	A	H	A	A	H	H	A	A	H	A	H	A	H	A	A	H	H
Result	D	L	L	D	D	D	D	L	L	L	L	D	L	W	D	L	W	L	D	D	W	D	L	W	L	W	L	W	W	W	W	D	W	W	L	W
Position																																				

Source: Swiss Super League
A = Away; H = Home; W = Win; D = Draw; L = Loss

==== Matches ====
20 July 2014 Round 1	Luzern	1–1	Sion	Lucerne
13:45 CEST (UTC+2)		Report		Stadium: swissporarena Attendance: 9,042; Referee: (Switzerland) Alain Bieri

27 July 2014 Round 2	Basel	3 – 0	Luzern	St. Jakob-Park, Basel
16:00	Streller 22' (1:0); Gashi 39' (2:0); Xhaka (yellow card) 58'; Callà 90+4' (3:0)	FCB summary Soccerway summary	(yellow card) 56' Lustenberger; (yellow card) 67' Jantscher; (yellow card) 73' Lezcano	Attendance: 29,410; Referee: (Switzerland) Sascha Amhof

3 August 2014 Round 3	St. Gallen	2–1	Luzern	St. Gallen
16:00 CEST (UTC+2)		Report		Stadium: Kybunpark; Attendance: 12,974; Referee: (Switzerland) Fedayi San

10 August 2014 Round 4	Luzern	1–1	Grasshopper	Lucerne
13:45 CEST (UTC+2)				Stadium: swissporarena

13 August 2014 5	Vaduz	1–1	Luzern	Vaduz
19:45 CEST (UTC+2)				Stadium: Rheinpark Stadion

16 August 2014 Round 6	Luzern	1–1	Zürich	Lucerne
20:00 CEST (UTC+2)				Stadium: swissporarena

30 August 2014 Round 7	Luzern	1–1	Aarau	Lucerne
20:00 CEST (UTC+2)				Stadium: swissporarena

14 September 2014 Round 8	Young Boys	3–2	Luzern	Bern
13:45 CEST (UTC+2)				Stadium: Stade de Suisse

23 September 2014 Round 9	Thun	3–2	Luzern	Thun
19:45 CEST (UTC+2)				Stadium: Stockhorn Arena

28 September 2014 Round 10	Luzern	1–2	St. Gallen	Lucerne
16:00 CEST (UTC+2)				Stadium: swissporarena

5 October 2014 Round 11	Sion	3–1	Luzern	Sion
13:45 CEST (UTC+2)				Stadium: Stade de Tourbillon

19 October 2014 Round 12	Luzern	0–0	Vaduz	Lucerne
13:45 CEST (UTC+2)				Stadium: swissporarena

1 November 2014 Round 14	Zürich	2–3	Luzern	Zürich
17:45 CET (UTC+1)				Stadium: Stadion Letzigrund

8 November 2014 Round 15	Luzern	0–0	Thun	Lucerne
17:45 CET (UTC+1)				Stadium: swissporarena

22 November 2014 Round 16	Grasshopper	3–2	Luzern	Zürich
20:00 CET (UTC+1)				Stadium: Stadion Letzigrund

29 November 2014 Round 17	Aarau	0–3	Luzern	Aarau
17:45 CET (UTC+1)				Stadium: Stadion Brügglifeld

3 December 2014 Round 13	Luzern	1–2	Young Boys	Lucerne
19:45 CET (UTC+1)				Stadium: swissporarena

6 December 2014 Round 18	Luzern	0 – 3	Basel	Swissporarena, Luzern
17:45	Affolter (yellow card) 16'; Jantscher (yellow card) 17'	FCB summary	(yellow card) 19' Samuel; 55' (0:1) Delgado; 61' (0:2) Delgado; 90+3' (0:3) Embolo	Attendance: 11,830; Referee: (Switzerland) Nikolaj Hänni

7 February 2015 Round 19	Luzern	1–1	Young Boys	Lucerne
17:45 CET (UTC+1)				Stadium: swissporarena

15 February 2015 Round 20	St. Gallen	0–0	Luzern	St. Gallen
13:45 CET (UTC+1)				Stadium: Kybunpark

22 February 2015 Round 21	Luzern	4–0	Aarau	Lucerne
13:45 CET (UTC+1)				Stadium: swissporarena

1 March 2015 Round 22	Sion	2–2	Luzern	Sion
16:00 CEST (UTC+2)				Stadium: Stade de Tourbillon

7 March 2015 Round 23	Grasshopper	1–0	Luzern	Zürich
17:45 CET (UTC+1)				Stadium: Stadion Letzigrund

14 March 2015 Round 24	Luzern	2–0	Vaduz	Lucerne
17:45 CET (UTC+1)				Stadium: swissporarena

21 March 2015 Round 25	Luzern	1 – 4	Basel	Swissporarena, Luzern
17:45	Omlin (yellow card) 48'; Bozanic (yellow card) 48'; Puljić 52' (1:3); Lustenberger (yellow card) 81'	FCB summary	(yellow card) 31' Xhaka; 32' (0:1) Gashi; 47' (pen. 0:2) Delgado; 49' (0:3) Gashi; (yellow card) 81' P. Degen; 87' (1:4) Callà	Attendance: 13,002; Referee: (Switzerland) Stephan Studer

4 April 2015 Round 26	Zürich	0–1	Luzern	Zürich
17:45 CEST (UTC+2)				Stadium: Stadion Letzigrund

11 April 2015 Round 27	Thun	1–0	Luzern	Thun
17:45 CEST (UTC+2)				Stadium: Stockhorn Arena

19 April 2015 Round 28	Luzern	2–0	Grasshopper	Lucerne
16:00 CEST (UTC+2)				Stadium: swissporarena

26 April 2015 Round 29	Basel	1 – 2	Luzern	St. Jakob-Park, Basel
13:45	Suchý (yellow card) 25'; Delgado 37' (1:2)	FCB summary	1' (0:1) Lezcano; 32' (0:2) Schneuwly; (yellow card) 36' Thiesson; (yellow card) 83' Lustenberger	Attendance: 28,897; Referee: (Switzerland) Stephan Studer

30 April 2015 Round 30	Luzern	6–2	St. Gallen	Lucerne
19:45 CEST (UTC+2)				Stadium: swissporarena

3 May 2015 Round 31	Aarau	2–6	Luzern	Aarau
13:45 CEST (UTC+2)				Stadium: Stadion Brügglifeld

10 May 2015 Round 32	Luzern	0–0	Thun	Lucerne
13:45 CEST (UTC+2)				Stadium: swissporarena

16 May 2015 Round 33	Vaduz	0–2	Luzern	Vaduz
17:45 CEST (UTC+2)				Stadium: Rheinpark Stadion

21 May 2015 Round 34	Young Boys	0–1	Luzern	Bern
19:45 CEST (UTC+2)				Stadium: Stade de Suisse

25 May 2015 Round 35	Luzern	0–1	Zürich	Lucerne
16:00 CEST (UTC+2)				Stadium: swissporarena

29 May 2015 Round 36	Luzern	3–0	Sion	Lucerne
20:30 CEST (UTC+2)				Stadium: swissporarena

=== UEFA Europa League ===
==== Second qualifying round ====
17 July 2014 First leg	Luzern (Switzerland)	1–1	(Scotland) St Johnstone	Lucerne, Switzerland
19:30 CEST (UTC+2)		Report		Stadium: swissporarena Attendance: 8,902; Referee: Benoît Bastien (France)

24 July 2014 Second leg	St Johnstone (Scotland)	1–1 (a.e.t.) (2–2 agg.) (5–4 p)	(Switzerland) Luzern	Perth, Scotland
19:45 BST (UTC+1)		Report		Stadium: McDiarmid Park; Attendance: 8,486; Referee: Jonathan Lardot (Belgium)
