= Holenstein =

Holenstein is a surname. Notable people with the surname include:

- Cameron Holenstein (born 1995), South African rugby union player
- Claudio Holenstein (born 1990), Swiss footballer
- Elmar Holenstein (born 1937), Swiss philosopher
- Konrad Holenstein (born 1948), Liechtensteiner retired football striker and manager
- Thomas Holenstein (1896-1962), Swiss politician

== See also ==
- Hollenstein
