= Hollenstein =

Hollenstein is a surname. Notable people with the surname include:

- Denis Hollenstein (born 1989), Swiss ice hockey player
- Felix Hollenstein (born 1965), Swiss ice hockey player
- Hans Hollenstein (born 1929), Swiss cyclist
- Reto Hollenstein (born 1985), Swiss cyclist
- Stephanie Hollenstein (1886–1944), Austrian painter
- Tommy Hollenstein, American painter and sculptor

== See also ==
- Holenstein
