= João Oliveira (Swiss footballer) =

Swiss footballer (born 1996)

Personal information
- Full name: João Pedro Abreu de Oliveira
- Date of birth: 6 January 1996 (age 30)
- Place of birth: Nyon, Switzerland
- Height: 1.77 m (5 ft 10 in)
- Position: Winger

Youth career
- FC Gingins
- Nyon
- –2013: FC Basel
- 2013–2014: FC Luzern

Senior career*
Years	Team	Apps	(Gls)
2014–2018	Luzern II	41	(16)
2015–2018	Luzern	32	(2)
2017–2018	→ Lechia Gdańsk (loan)	19	(3)
2018–2020	Lausanne-Sport	62	(4)
2020–2021	Cova da Piedade	25	(4)
2021–2023	Leixões	54	(6)
2023–2024	Debrecen	10	(0)
2024–2026	Arka Gdynia	47	(5)

International career
2011	Switzerland U15	4	(2)
2011–2012	Switzerland U16	8	(0)
2012–2013	Switzerland U17	7	(0)
2014	Switzerland U18	3	(0)
2014–2015	Switzerland U19	6	(1)
2015–2017	Switzerland U20	11	(5)
2016–2018	Switzerland U21	8	(1)
- * Club domestic league appearances and goals as of 17:48, 25 May 2026 (UTC)

João Pedro Abreu de Oliveira (born 6 January 1996) is a Swiss professional footballer who plays as a winger.

He also holds Portuguese citizenship.

== Career ==
On 18 July 2015, Oliveira made his professional debut with FC Luzern in a 2015–16 Swiss Super League match against FC Sion.

On 15 August 2017, he was loaned to Ekstraklasa side Lechia Gdańsk.

At the end of the 2025–26 Ekstraklasa season, where Arka Gdynia were relegated after just one season in the top flight, the club announced that Oliveira's contract would not be extended past June 2026. Overall, he made 49 appearances and scored five goals for Arka.

== Career statistics ==
As of match played 27 April 2026

Appearances and goals by club, season and competition
Club	Season	League			National cup (Note: Includes Swiss Cup, Taça de Portugal, Polish Cup)		Europe		Other		Total	
Club	Season	Division	Apps	Goals	Apps	Goals	Apps	Goals	Apps	Goals	Apps	Goals
Luzern II	2013–14	1. Liga Gr. 2	6	0	—		—		—		6	0
Luzern II	2014–15	1. Liga Gr. 2	21	6	—		—		—		21	6
Luzern II	2015–16	1. Liga Gr. 2	10	3	—		—		—		10	3
Luzern II	2016–17	1. Liga Gr. 2	3	5	—		—		—		3	5
Luzern II	2017–18	1. Liga Gr. 2	1	2	—		—		—		1	2
Luzern II	Total		41	16	—		—		—		41	16
Luzern	2015–16	Swiss Super League	16	0	0	0	—		—		17	1
Luzern	2016–17	Swiss Super League	15	2	1	0	1 (Note: Appearance in UEFA Europa League)	0	—		18	3
Luzern	2017–18	Swiss Super League	1	0	0	0	1	0	—		2	0
Luzern	Total		32	2	1	0	2	0	—		35	3
Lechia Gdańsk (loan)	2017–18	Ekstraklasa	19	3	0	0	—		—		19	3
Lausanne-Sport	2018–19	Swiss Challenge League	30	3	1	0	—		—		31	3
Lausanne-Sport	2019–20	Swiss Challenge League	32	1	3	0	—		—		35	1
Lausanne-Sport	Total		62	4	4	0	—		—		66	4
Cova da Piedade	2020–21	Liga Portugal 2	25	4	1	1	—		—		26	5
Leixões	2021–22	Liga Portugal 2	26	3	1	0	—		0	0	27	3
Leixões	2022–23	Liga Portugal 2	28	3	3	3	—		4 (Note: Appearances in Taça da Liga)	0	35	3
Leixões	Total		54	6	4	3	—		4	0	62	6
Debrecen	2023–24	Nemzeti Bajnokság I	10	0	0	0	4 (Note: Appearances in UEFA Europa Conference League)	0	—		14	0
Arka Gdynia	2024–25	I liga	33	5	2	0	—		—		35	5
Arka Gdynia	2025–26	Ekstraklasa	14	0	0	0	—		—		14	0
Arka Gdynia	Total		47	5	2	0	—		—		49	5
Career total			290	40	12	4	6	0	4	0	312	44

== Honours ==
Arka Gdynia

- I liga: 2024–25
