= Tommy Hollenstein =

American painter

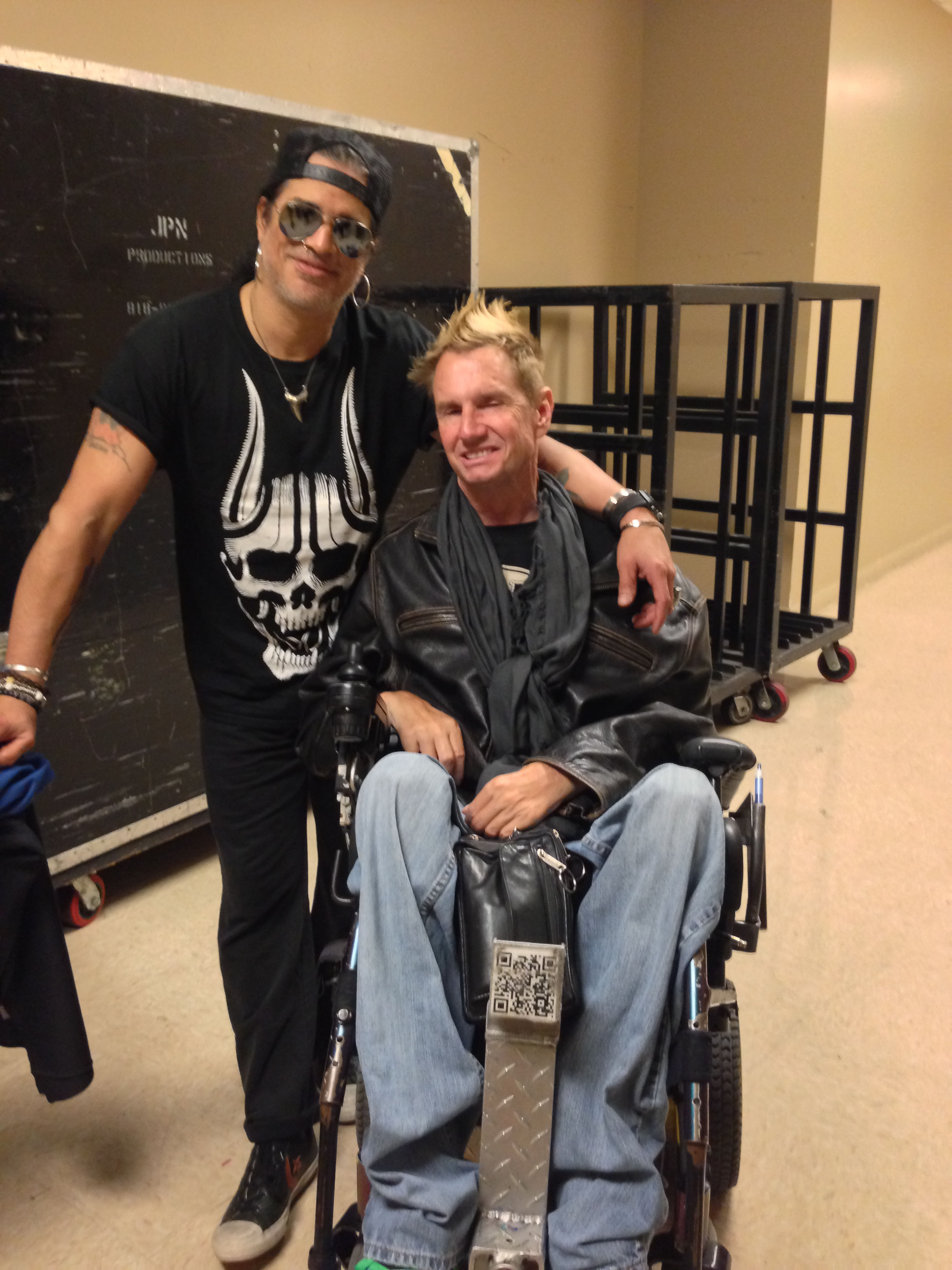
- Tommy Hollenstein with guitarist Slash
- Born: Los Angeles, California
- Known for: Painting, sculpture
- Movement: Abstract impressionism
- Patrons: Ringo Starr, Elton John, Slash, Reebok, Ackerberg Collection

Tommy Hollenstein is an American abstract impressionist painter and found object sculptor. In his early twenties he becamequadriplegic after an accident. Hollenstein has become a highly respected disabled artist who utilizes the tires of his wheelchair instead of traditional painting methods to create his works. Hollenstein has numerous celebrity and art collector patrons, and his art has appeared in numerous private and public installations throughout the United States. He is also involved in philanthropy, donating paintings and the proceeds of his sales to numerous charitable organizations.

== Biography ==
Hollenstein, the son of a restaurateur father and an ex-Marine Corps mother, was raised in Canoga Park, in the San Fernando Valley region of the Los Angeles Metropolitan Area. As a young man, Hollenstein was an enthusiast of extreme sports, and enjoyed skateboarding, surfing, and mountain biking. He took an interest in the arts as well, making his first inroads into artistic work in creating edible art from watermelons. He also trained to become a private detective.

On March 10, 1985, Hollenstein was involved in a bicycling accident that broke his neck, causing him to become a C4/C5 quadriplegic and confining him to a wheelchair. While recovering from the injury, Hollenstein was introduced to mouth stick painting, which he rejected because he felt it was too restrictive. Hollenstein initially began working as a private investigator assigned to missing persons cases, and eventually moved over to working on modified service vans for disabled people.

Hollenstein began painting through an incident involving a service dog. Hollenstein's service dog had had a stroke, and Hollenstein wanted to memorialize the dog by creating a painting that places the dog's paw prints next to the tracks of his wheelchair. Hollenstein created two paintings featuring the dog's footprints next to his wheelchair tracks, upon which he realized that he could use the tires of his wheelchair to paint instead of brushes. He then built a studio and began working on paintings at night. Hollenstein began shopping his paintings to art dealers and had his first solo exhibition in 2005.

== Artistic style ==
Hollenstein works in an abstract impressionist style which incorporates bright colors and often invokes a sense of motion. Hollenstein credits Jackson Pollock and Claude Monet as major influences, and is in particular a disciple of Monet's Rouen Cathedral series. Hollenstein also credits his Christian faith as an inspiration in his work, and has created several works with inspirational themes.

Hollenstein's works utilize Behr house paints and pretreated Masonite boards. He brushes paint onto the wheels of his wheelchair, and then uses the wheels to paint the boards, applying layers of color over top of each other over a period of time. The number of layers in a painting will vary from three all the way up to fifty. Some of Hollenstein's paintings feature noticeable tire track patterns, and others utilize bald tires and other techniques that make it difficult to tell that the art was created with the tires of a wheelchair. Hollenstein gives most of his finished paintings a one-word title that represents the painting's theme. Hollenstein then uses his leftover brushes and dipsticks to create found object sculptures.

== Patrons ==
Hollenstein's patron list includes numerous celebrities in the music and entertainment fields. Actor Joaquin Phoenix became an early celebrity patron when he purchased two paintings from Hollenstein's first solo exhibition. Other celebrity patrons include Ringo Starr, Slash (Guns N' Roses), Elliot Easton (The Cars), Nick Hexum (311), author Dean Koontz, Elton John, and television evangelist Joel Osteen.

Malibu-based art collector Lisette Ackerberg, the widow of real estate developer Norman Ackerberg, has assembled one of Southern California's premier private abstract art collections. The Ackerbeg collection, which includes works by Pablo Picasso and Willem de Kooning, also includes Hollenstein's painting Unseen.

== Charity work ==
Hollenstein regularly donates paintings and the proceeds of sales to charitable and non-profit organizations. Ten percent of all of the sales of Hollenstein's paintings go to Canine Companions for Independence, a non-profit organization that trains service dogs.

In 2007, Hollenstein's paintings were featured in an exhibit at the Boston Children's Hospital, which led to Hollenstein coming out on location to the hospital to teach wheelchair-using children how to paint with the tires of their wheelchairs. In 2008, Hollenstein donated Helping Hands, a painting which featured the handprints of sixteen rock musicians, including those of Ringo Starr and Joe Walsh, to the non-profit Shane's Inspiration. In 2009, Hollenstein donated paintings to a concert benefit for Los Angeles-based charity Adopt The Arts that "preserves and creates arts programs in U.S. public schools". In 2011, a solo exhibition of Hollenstein's work entitled "Wheels of Hope" donated forty percent of its proceeds to six different charitable organizations.
