= Elmar Holenstein =

Swiss philosopher

Elmar Holenstein (born 7 January 1937 in Gossau, Canton St. Gallen) is a Swiss philosopher with research interests in the fields of philosophical psychology, philosophy of language and cultural philosophy.

== Scholarly career ==
Elmar Holenstein studied philosophy, psychology, and linguistics at the universities of Louvain/Leuven, Heidelberg, and Zurich from 1964 to 1972. His Ph.D. dissertation dealt with the phenomenology of the pre- and non-conceptual human experience as explored by Edmund Husserl (1859–1938), the German founder of the phenomenological movement in philosophy. Holenstein gained professorial status (habilitation) by a book on the phenomenological structuralism of Roman Jakobson.

Between 1971 and 1997 he continued his studies at the Husserl archive in Leuven, at Harvard University with Roman Jakobson, and at the University of Hawai'i. He was a member of the "linguistic universals project UNITYP" of the Swiss linguist Hansjakob Seiler at the University of Cologne and pursued further research with Joseph Greenberg at Stanford University, also at the Institute of the Studies of Languages and Cultures of Asia and Africa in Tokyo, and at the Collegium Budapest.

From 1977 to 1990 Holenstein taught philosophy at the Ruhr University in Bochum, Germany, then at ETH Zurich until his retirement in 2002 when he moved to Yokohama, Japan. In the academic year 1986/87 he was guest professor at the University of Tokyo and in 2004 Tang-Chun-I Professor at the Chinese University of Hong Kong.

== Main philosophical viewpoints ==
=== Decentering the ego ===
Holenstein's early philosophical analyses strive to clarify the processes involved in cognition, especially in associations, that occur "without the (conscious and volitional) participation of the I." In his programmatic essay "Der Nullpunkt der Orientierung" (The Zero-Point of Orientation), Holenstein demonstrates that the "I", while indeed the point of origin of his or her perceptions, is experienced in no way as the orientational center of his or her field of perception. The mightest object in this field functions as center of orientation. Its form (Gestalt) is thereby often more decisive than its meaning. The significance of "I-consciousness" in ethical action, however, as well as in communication, being structured by a sender and a recipient, is unquestioned.

=== Phenomenological structuralism ===
Holenstein views Prague Structuralism as understood by Roman Jakobson (1896–1982), as a Husserlian structuralism expanded by dimensions of inter-subjectivity and of the unconscious that enlarge the understanding of the subject. According to Jakobson, phenomenology and structuralism form – in contrast to a dominant fashionable understanding – an inseparable unity. They are as interconnected, just as the participant and the observer perspectives as well as formal and semantic (i.e. content) aspects prove to be in language studies. Inspired by the Swiss philosopher Anton Marty, Jakobson, and Greenberg, Holenstein deals in depth with putative language universals, and their possible understanding.

=== Philosophical psychology ===
From the start Holenstein's actual research interest in his studies of language centered on the relationship between experience, language, and thinking, later increasingly on that between "nature" and "mind", the traditional "mind-body" problem, and in connection with it on the heuristic function of the comparison between natural and artificial intelligence. Based on gestalt-psychology and cognitive science, he claimed early that the categorical structuring of perceiving and thinking is much less language-dependent than it was claimed during the early twentieth century in the heyday of linguistic relativism. Neurology may prove that the freedom of will as the basis of human action is imaginary, but it is incapable to prove that consciousness is not a psychological reality. Not only the outdated mechanistic physics as Descartes (1596–1650) conceived it but also today's physics is unable to explain consciousness. Therefore, we have to admit that we do not know the inmost fabric of nature, its intima fabrica, as Albrecht von Haller (1708–1777) put it, that serves as origin of consciousness. In Holenstein's view an enlarged naturalist understanding of consciousness seems to be valid in psychology as well as in ethics.

=== Comparative cultural philosophy ===
Based on the methodological perspectives that Holenstein had gained in the years of his linguistic scholarly endeavors, he undertook the comparative investigation of cultural phenomena. Given the fluidity of research, he developed his philosophy of culture not in a systematic treatise, but in modular fashion. Central to his inquiry are cultural universals, the comparability of intra- and intercultural variations, and the indefensible view of the Romantics who regarded cultures as closed structural units. He strove to explain intra- and intercultural as well as intrapersonal conflicts and the impossibility of a simultaneous optimal realization of all value assumptions. He stressed further the importance of neighborly trans-regional relationships for historical change and an in-born ability of code switching for intercultural understanding. For Holenstein, Asia is not only a millennia old treasury of spirituality but also of secularism, of moral tenets embraced independently of religious persuasions. In courses his most often used essay is titled: "A Dozen Rules of Thumb for Avoiding Intercultural Misunderstanding."

=== Philosophy atlas ===
New visual teaching aids motivated Holenstein to try "experimental cultural geography." Geography shows what it shows in its spatial context. Therefore, maps are especially suited to visualize that European philosophy is not understandable without its non-European context. Holenstein is committed to showing impressive philosophical developments in Asia beyond the so-called axial age. He also demonstrates that, like in Europe, the philosophical centers in China and India moved at different times to different regions. Holenstein finally also explores the ecological and economic basis of the diverse oral traditions of Africa and of the pre-invasion Americas.

=== Unique Swiss political traditions ===
The call to the ETH Zurich led Holenstein to complement his cultural philosophical investigations by a series of studies that relate to typical traits of the Swiss political system. Topics include positive aspects such as the peaceful coexistence of several language groups. This is supported by the international prestige of its two main minority languages and the actual privileging of all three of them, as well as by the fortunate fact that political, linguistic, denominational and economic frontiers do not coincide. He addressed issues, furthermore, concerning traditional social covenants such as agreements between employers’ and employees’ associations, mediation, mutual acceptance of diverse laws in the cantons, informal ideals like good faith and fairness, free movement, neutrality in case of a global conflict between civilizations, and the historical background of the invocation of God in the constitution's preamble.

=== Ethics ===
Like his language-oriented philosophical studies, also Holenstein's few texts that relate to ethics center on cognitive issues: Conscience, moral feelings, and sense of responsibility. They are intuitively experienced as binding. Although they are natural experiences the appeal to them does not (even not according to Kant) imply a naturalistic fallacy. Without them humans would have only a utilitaristic understanding of the categorical imperative.

== Selected bibliography ==
=== Monographs ===
- Phänomenologie der Assoziation: Zu Struktur und Funktion eines Grundprinzips der passiven Genesis bei Edmund Husserl, 1972.
- Roman Jakobson's Approach to Language: Phenomenological Structuralism, 1976
- Sprachliche Universalien: Eine Untersuchung zur Natur des menschlichen Geistes, 1985
- Sokrates: 2400 Jahre nach seiner Verurteilung zum Suizid, 2002
- Philosophie-Atlas: Orte und Wege des Denkens, 2004

=== Article collections ===
- Linguistik, Semiotik, Hermeneutik: Plädoyer für eine strukturale Phänomenologie, 1976.
- Von der Hintergehbarkeit der Sprache: Kognitive Unterlagen der Sprache, 1980.
- Menschliches Selbstverständnis: Ichbewusstsein – Intersubjektive Verantwortung – Interkulturelle Verständigung, 1985.
- Kulturphilosophische Perspektiven: Schulbeispiel Schweiz – Europäische Identität – Globale Verständigungsmöglichkeiten, 1998.
- China ist nicht ganz anders: Vier Essays in global vergleichender Kulturgeschichte, 2009.

=== Edited works ===
- Edmund Husserl, Logische Untersuchungen. 1. Band: Prolegomena zur reinen Logik: Husserliana 18, 1975.
- Roman Jakobson, Hölderlin, Klee, Brecht: Zur Wortkunst dreier Gedichte, 1976.
- (with Tarcisius Schelbert) Roman Jakobson, Poetik: Ausgewählte Aufsätze, 1979.
- Roman Jakobson, Hans-Georg Gadamer & E. H., Das Erbe Hegels II, 1984.
- Roman Jakobson, Semiotik: Ausgewählte Texte, 1988.
- Takeo Doi, Amae – Freiheit in Geborgenheit: Zur Struktur japanischer Psyche, 1982.

=== Diverse essays ===
==== (a) on philosophical psychology ====
- The Zero-Point of Orientation: The Place of the I in the Perceived Space, in: The Body: Classic and Contemporary Readings, ed. by Donn Welton, Oxford: Blackwell, 1999: 57–94.
- Natural and Artificial Intelligence: Phenomenology and Computer Science, in: Descriptions, ed. by Don Ihde & Hugh J. Silverman, Albany: State University of New York Press, 1985: 162–174.
- Representation and Intuition: Machine Knowledge and Human Consciousness, in: Merleau-Ponty Circle: Tenth Annual International Conference, 26–28 Sept. 1985: Conference Proceedings, Carbondale IL: Southern Illinois University, 59–76.
- Koevolutionäre Erkenntnistheorie, in: Transzendentale oder evolutionäre Erkenntnistheorie? Ed. by Wilhelm Lütterfelds, 1987: 307–333.
- Die Psychologie als eine Tochter von Philosophie und Physiologie, in: Das Gehirn – Organ der Seele: Zur Ideengeschichte der Neurobiologie, ed. by Ernst Florey & Olaf Breidbach, 1993: 285–308.
- Die kausale Rolle von Bewusstsein und Vernunft, in: Bewusstsein, hg. von Sybille Krämer, 1996: 184–212.
- Natural Ethics: Legitimate Naturalism in Ethics, in: Phenomenology 2005, volume 1: Selected Essays from Asia, ed. by Cheung Chan-Fai & Yu Chung-Chi, 2007: 133–149.
- Semiotics as a Cognitive Science, in: Cognitive Semiotics 3, 2008: 6–19.
- Categorial Pluralism: Naturalizing Phenomenology and Phenomenologizing Natural Science”, in: Metodo. International Studies in Phenomenology and Philosophy 2, n. 2, 2014: 251–270.
- Natural Ethics: Legitimate Naturalism in Ethics, in: Phenomenology 2005, volume 1: Selected Essays from Asia, ed. by Cheung Chan-Fai & Yu Chung-Chi, 2007: 133–149.
- Semiotics as a Cognitive Science, in: Cognitive Semiotics 3, 2008: 6–19.
- Categorial Pluralism: Naturalizing Phenomenology and Phenomenologizing Natural Science”, in: Metodo. International Studies in Phenomenology and Philosophy 2, n. 2, 2014: 251–270.

==== (b) on cultural philosophy ====
- A Dozen Rules of Thumb for Avoiding Intercultural Misunderstandings”, in: Polylog (online): http://them.polylog.org/4/ahe-en.htm
- Die Kulturgeschichte der Menschheit: Ihre Konzeption bei Hegel (bis 1831), bei Jaspers (1948) und heute (1999), in: Karl Jaspers: Philosophie und Politik, ed. by Reiner Wiehl & Dominic Kaegi, 1999: 163–184.
- Philosophie außerhalb Europas, in: Orthafte Ortlosigkeit der Philosophie: Festschrift für Ram Adhar Mall zum 70. Geburtstag, 2007: 65–77.
- Zu der Relativität des sprachlichen Relativismus, in: Wege zur Kultur: Gemeinsamkeiten – Differenzen – Interdisziplinäre Dimensionen, ed. by Hamid Reza Yousefi et al., 2008: 343–360.
- Complex Cultural Traditions, in: Identity and Alterity: Phenomenology and Cultural Traditions, ed. by Kwok-Ying Lau et al., Würzburg: Königshausen & Neumann, 2010: 47–63.
- One or Two? Two Kindred Poems by Qianlong and Goethe, in: Roman Jakobson: linguistica e poetica, a cura di Stefania Sini et al., Milano: Ledizioni, 2018: 237–264.

=== Literature about Elmar Holenstein ===
- Noé, Shin’ya: Phenomenology and Cognitive Psychology, in: Japanese and Western Phenomenology, ed. by P. Blosser et al., The Hague: Kluwer Academic Publishers, 1993: 335–344.
- Norbert Mecklenburg: Interkulturelle Philosophie: Habermas und Holenstein, in: Das Mädchen aus der Fremde: Germanistik als interkulturelle Literaturwissenschaft. Iudicium, München 2008, ISBN 978-3-89129-552-6, p. 135–152.
