= Kaja Rogulj =

Croatian footballer

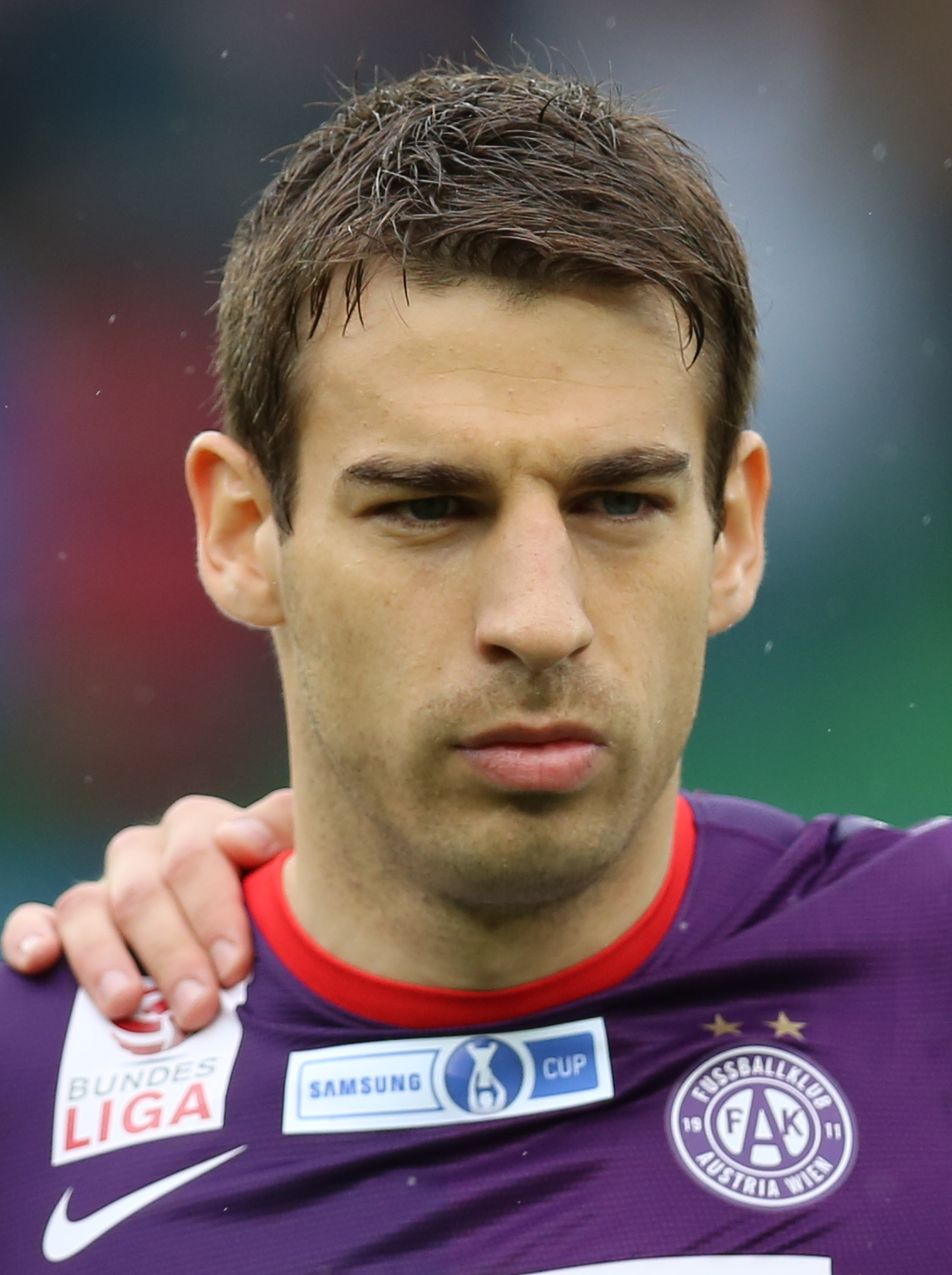

Personal information
- Date of birth: 15 June 1986 (age 40)
- Place of birth: Split, Croatia
- Height: 1.87 m (6 ft 2 in)
- Position: Centre back

Youth career
- 1995–1997: NK BŠK Zmaj Blato
- 1997–2003: Hajduk Split
- 2003–2005: Omiš

Senior career*
Years	Team	Apps	(Gls)
2005	Posušje	9	(0)
2006	Segesta	9	(1)
2006–2008	Posušje	52	(0)
2008–2011	Slaven Belupo	76	(4)
2011–2014	Austria Wien	72	(3)
2012	→ Austria Wien II	1	(0)
2014–2017	Luzern	25	(0)
2017	→ Le Mont (loan)	15	(0)
2017–2018	Žalgiris	3	(1)
2018	Dugopolje	5	(0)
2018–2019	Horn	21	(1)
- * Club domestic league appearances and goals

Kaja Rogulj (born 15 June 1986) is a Croatian retired football player who played as a defender.

== Club career ==
Rogulj started his football career at the NK BŠK Zmaj Blato on the island of Korčula, before moving to the HNK Hajduk Split, where he spent most of his formative years in a generation that featured, among others, Drago Gabrić and Tomislav Bušić. In 2003, however, he moved on to the NK Omiš U-19 team, where he spent the following two years.

He played his first senior team matches, however, in Bosnia and Herzegovina, at NK Posušje where he moved in 2005, and where he spent, apart from a half-season stint at HNK Segesta the following three years.

In 2008, he moved back to Croatia, to NK Slaven Belupo, featuring soon in a 2-1 aggregate UEFA Cup second qualifying round upset against Aris before being eliminated by CSKA Moscow. On 3 March 2009, in a match against Dinamo Zagreb Kaja received an instant red card after a particularly nasty tackle on Mario Mandžukić. Later on, he was suspended for two games and had to pay a fine of around €700. He remained a first team regular until the end of his stint at Slaven, and featured in the 2009–10 UEFA Europa League qualifiers, until his team was eliminated by Tromsø IL.

In the summer of 2011, he moved to Austria Wien, signing a 2+1 year contract, with director Thomas Parits praising his jumping, timing and tackling. After a rocky first season, he established himself as a first-team player in the 2012/13 season, winning the 2012–13 Austrian Football Bundesliga with his club, and making his debut in the UEFA Champions League in 2013. After eliminating GNK Dinamo Zagreb with 4–3 on aggregate, Rogulj played in all group matches against Zenit Staint Petersburg, Atlético Madrid and FC Porto but one.

In the summer of 2014, he moved on to the Swiss team FC Luzern.

On 30 October 2017, he became a member of FK Žalgiris in Lithuania.

Rogulj retired at the end of the 2018–19 season.
