= Lorenzo Bucchi =

Italian footballer and coach

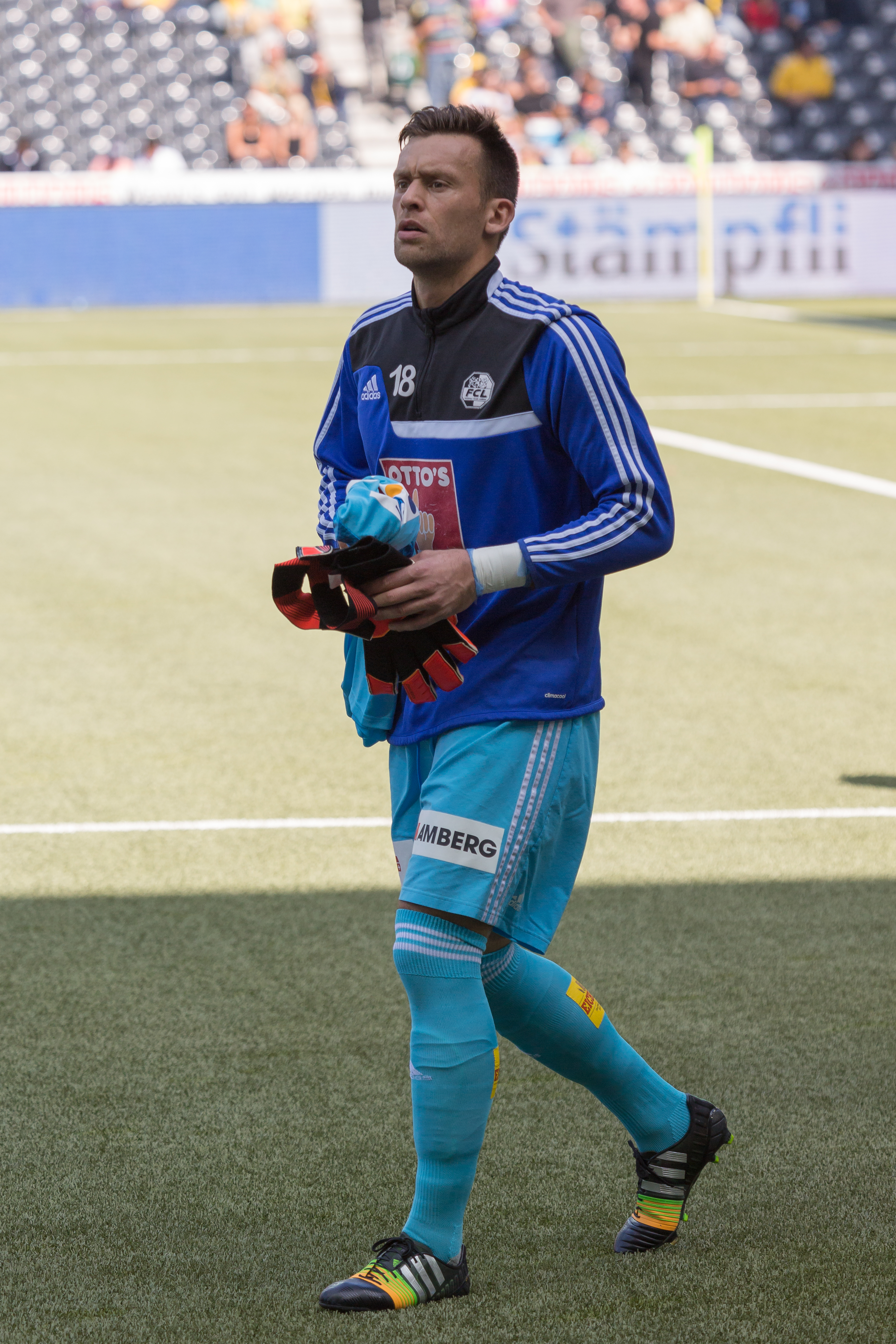

Personal information
- Full name: Lorenzo Bucchi
- Date of birth: November 21, 1983 (age 42)
- Place of birth: Rome, Italy
- Height: 1.86 m (6 ft 1 in)
- Position: Goalkeeper

Team information
- Current team: FC Luzern (goalkeeper coach)

Senior career*
Years	Team	Apps	(Gls)
2001–2003	Ternana	2	(0)
2002–2003	→ Giulianova (loan)	0	(0)
2003–2005	Fidelis Andria	4	(0)
2005–2009	Bellinzona	91	(0)
2009–2010	Grasshopper	4	(0)
2011–2012	Arezzo	8	(0)
2012–2013	FC Fribourg	14	(0)
2013–2016	Luzern	5	(0)
2016–2017	FC Aarau	21	(0)

Managerial career
- 2017–2018: FC Aarau (U18 goalkeeper coach)
- 2017–2018: FC Aarau (U21 goalkeeper coach)
- 2017–2018: FC Aarau (goalkeeper coach)
- 2018–: FC Luzern (goalkeeper coach)
- * Club domestic league appearances and goals

Lorenzo Bucchi (born 21 November 1983, in Rome) is an Italian retired football goalkeeper. He is currently working as a goalkeeper coach at FC Luzern.
