= Thermoplan Arena =

Football stadium in Lucerne, Switzerland

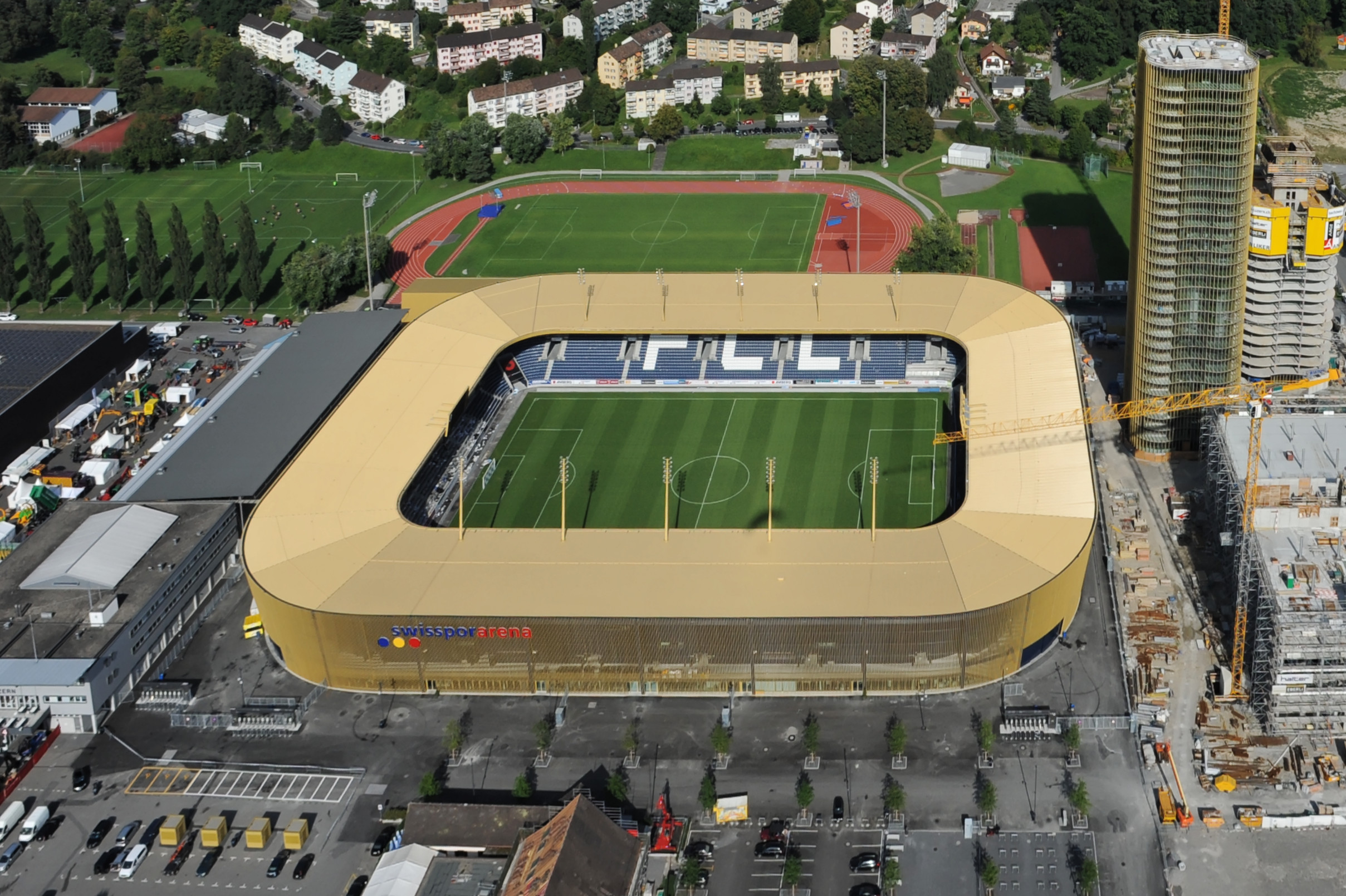
- Interactive map of Thermoplan Arena
- Location: Lucerne, Switzerland
- Coordinates: 47.0333°N 8.3052°E
- Operator: Stadion Luzern AG
- Capacity: 16,800
- Surface: Grass
- Field size: 105 m × 68 m

Construction
- Built: 2009–2011
- Opened: 31 July 2011
- Cost: CHF 73 million EUR € 60 million
- Architects: Daniele Marques; Iwan Bühler

Tenants
- FC Luzern; Switzerland national football team (selected matches)

Thermoplan Arena, formerly known as Swissporarena, is a multi-use stadium in Lucerne, Switzerland, completed in 2011. It is used mostly for football matches and hosts the home matches of FC Luzern of the Swiss Super League. The stadium has a capacity of 16,800 spectators, including an away fans' section fitted with 390 rail seats for safe standing. It replaced the demolished Stadion Allmend.

The stadium was due to open earlier in the year, but several problems during construction changed the plans. In February 2011, the club announced the new season ticket prices for their return home.

The stadium held its first match, a 0–0 draw against FC Thun on 31 July 2011.

Since November 2012, the stadium and surrounding area have been served by the underground Lucerne Allmend/Messe railway station.

== International matches ==
=== International matches ===
Date	Team #1	Result	Team #2	Competition
30 May 2012	Switzerland	0–1	Romania	Friendly
11 September 2012	Switzerland	2–0	Albania	2014 FIFA World Cup Qualification
30 May 2014	Switzerland	1–0	Jamaica	Friendly
3 June 2014	Switzerland	2–0	Peru	Friendly
27 March 2015	Switzerland	3–0	Estonia	UEFA Euro 2016 qualifying
18 August 2016	Jordan	2–3	Qatar	Friendly
13 November 2016	Switzerland	2–0	Faroe Islands	2018 FIFA World Cup Qualification
27 March 2018	Switzerland	6–0	Panama	Friendly
18 November 2018	Switzerland	5–2	Belgium	2018–19 UEFA Nations League
15 November 2021	Switzerland	4–0	Bulgaria	2022 FIFA World Cup Qualification
19 June 2023	Switzerland	2–2	Romania	UEFA Euro 2024 qualifying
4 June 2024	Switzerland	4–0	Estonia	Friendly
3 October 2026	Switzerland	2–1	Slovenia	2026–27 UEFA Nations League
6 October 2026	Switzerland	3–0	North Macedonia	2026–27 UEFA Nations League

=== UEFA Women's Euro 2025 ===
For the UEFA Women's Euro 2025 in Switzerland, the stadium will host 3 games of the group stage.

The following games were played at the stadium during the UEFA Women's Euro 2025:

Date	Time (CEST)	Team #1	Res.	Team #2	Round	Spectators
5 July 2025	18:00	Wales	0–3	Netherlands	Group D	14,147
8 July 2025	21:00	Poland	0–3	Sweden	Group C	14,176
12 July 2025	21:00	Poland	3–2	Denmark	Group C	14,213

== Gallery ==
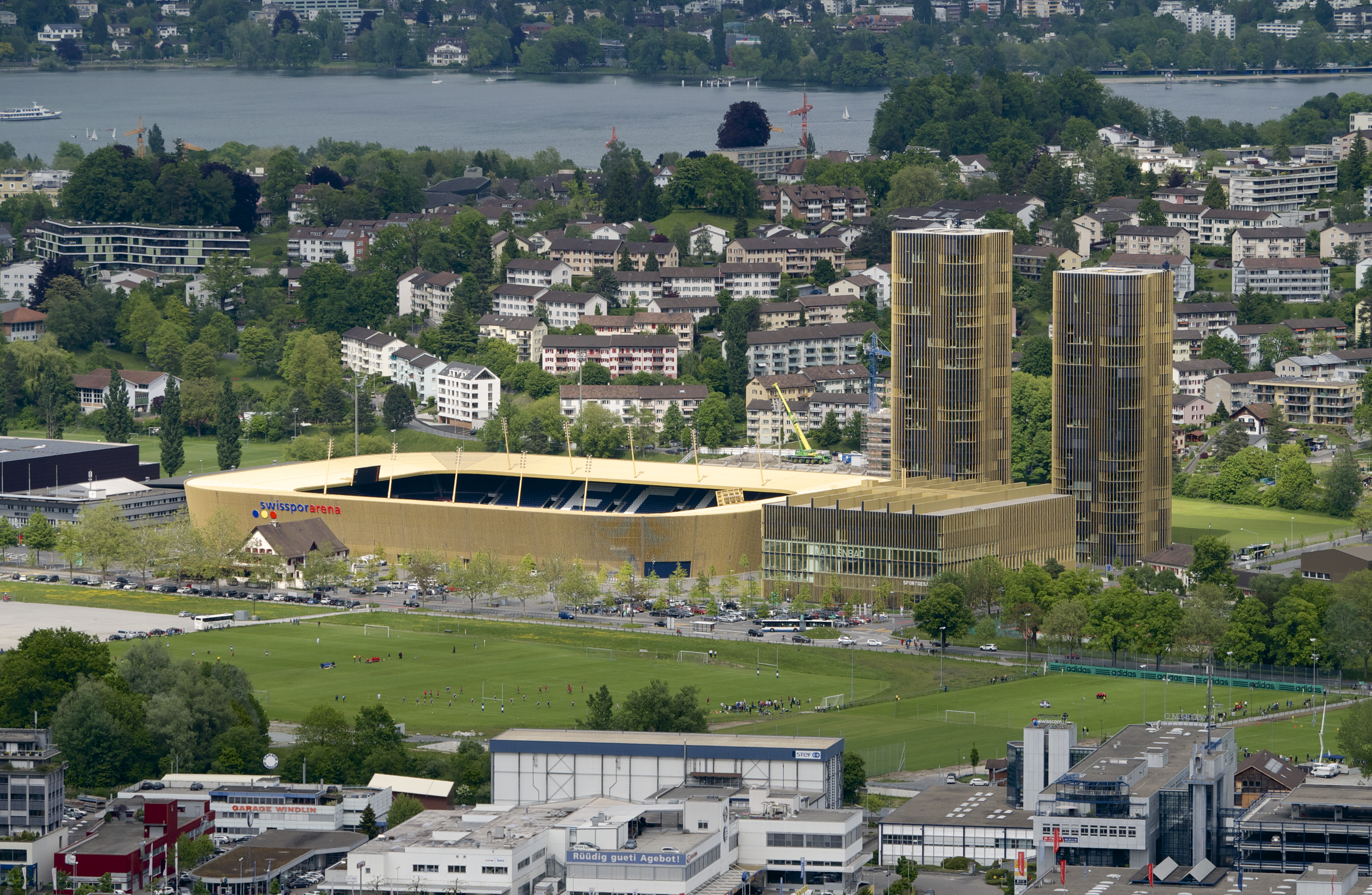
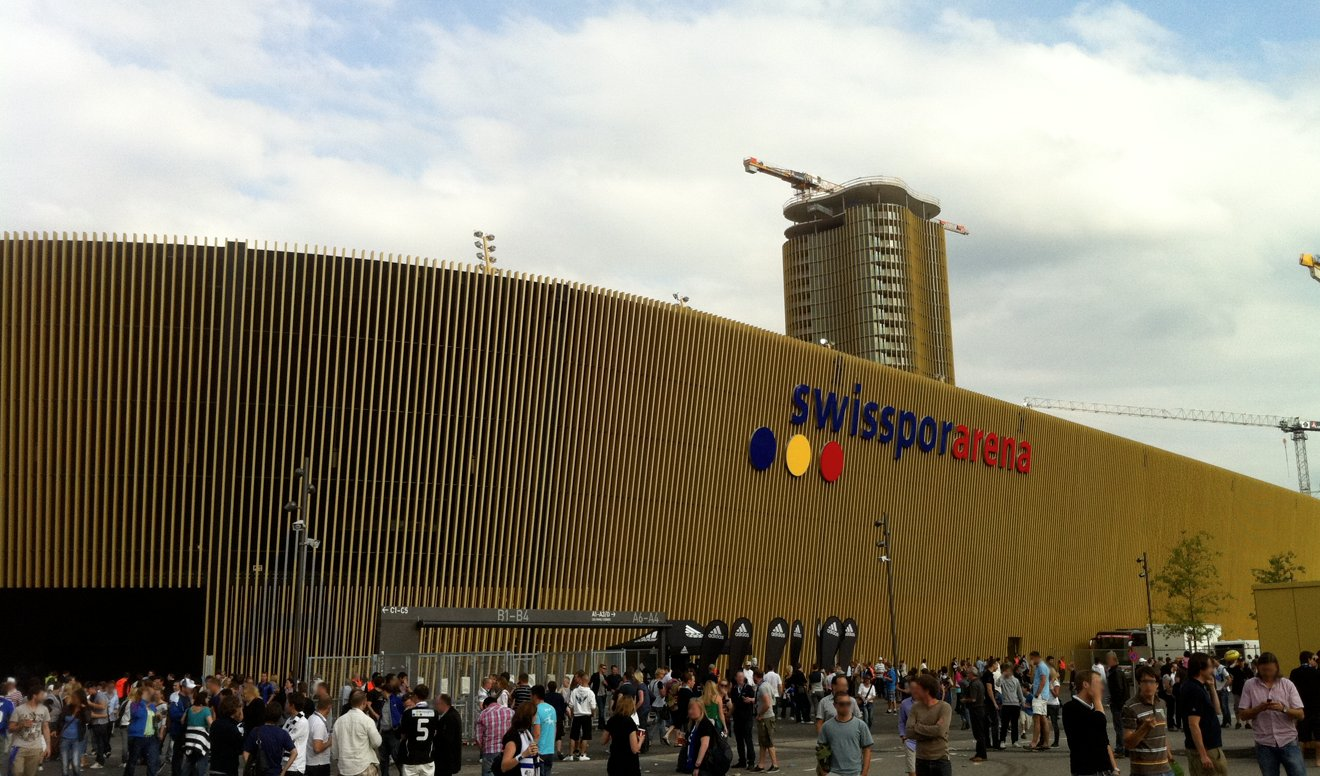
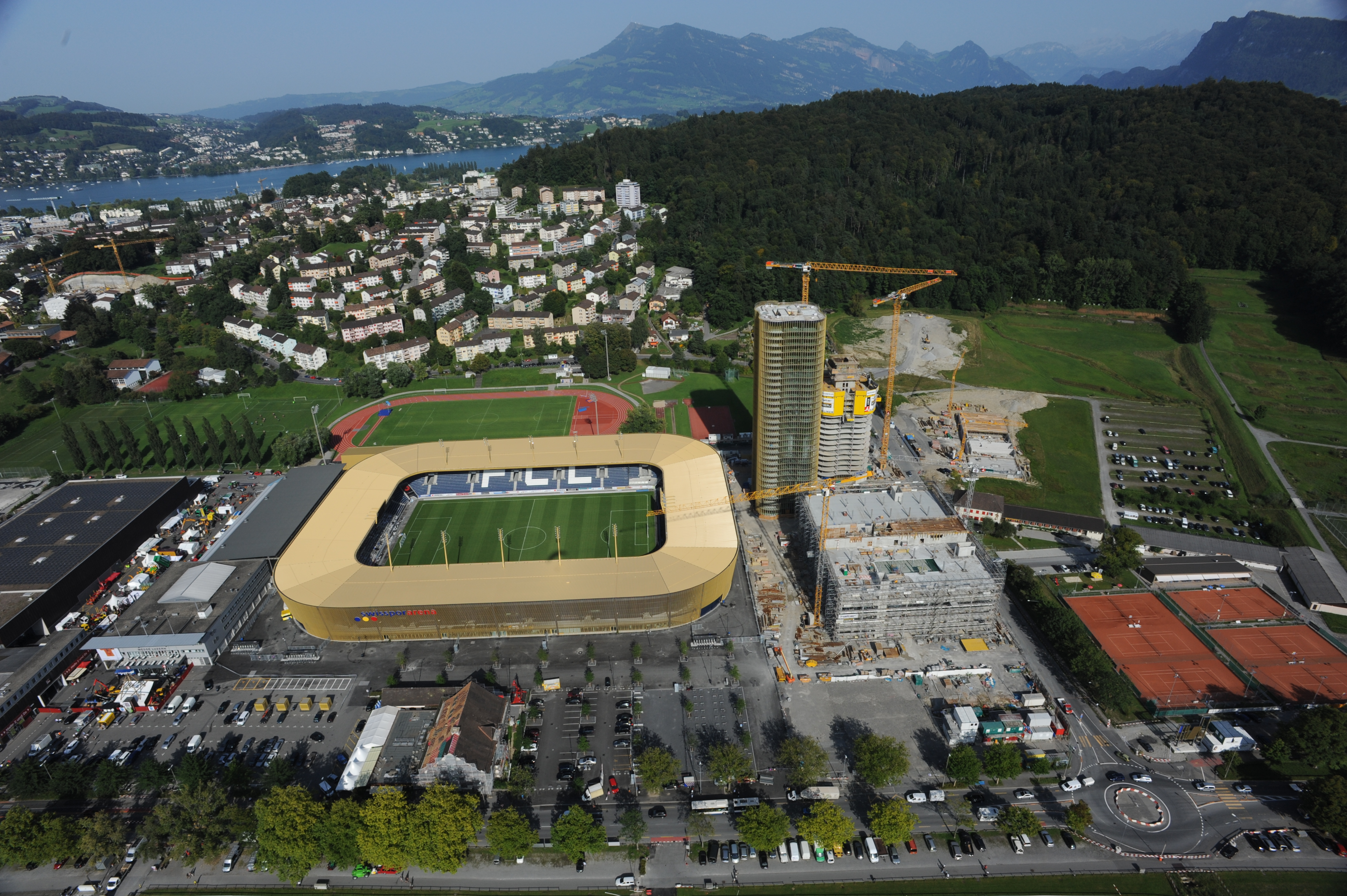
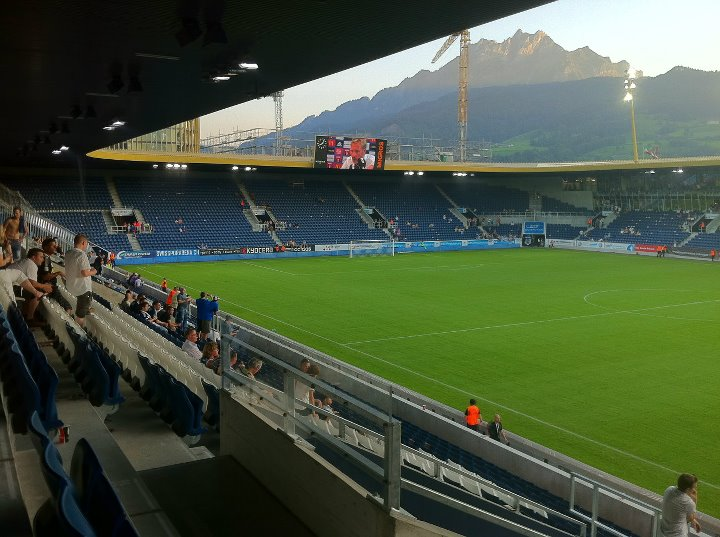
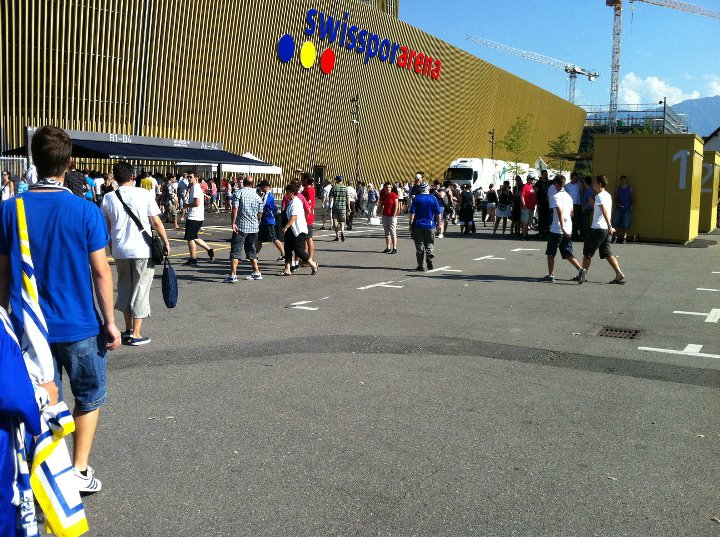
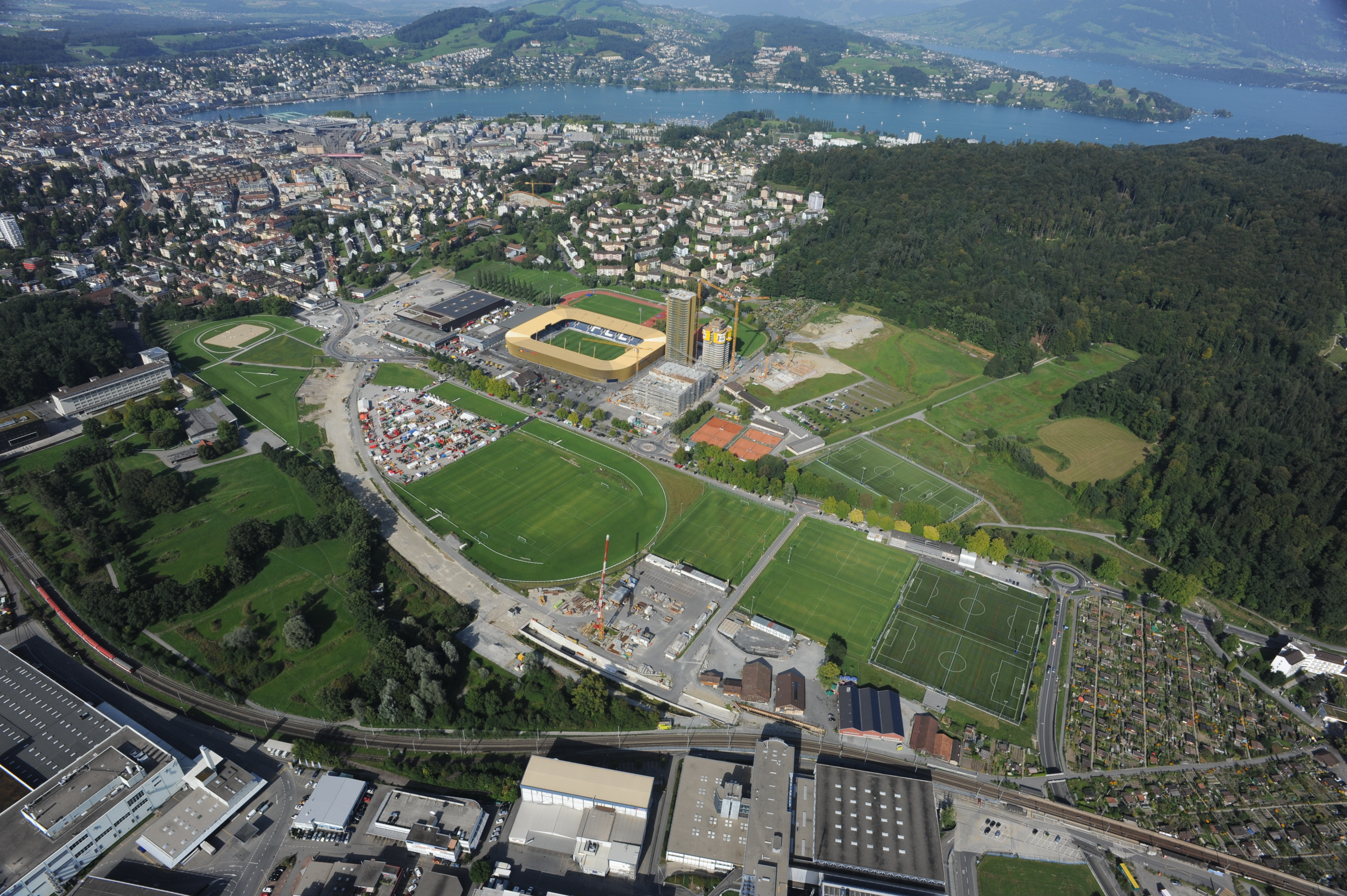

== See also ==
- List of football stadiums in Switzerland
