= François Affolter =

Swiss footballer (born 1991)

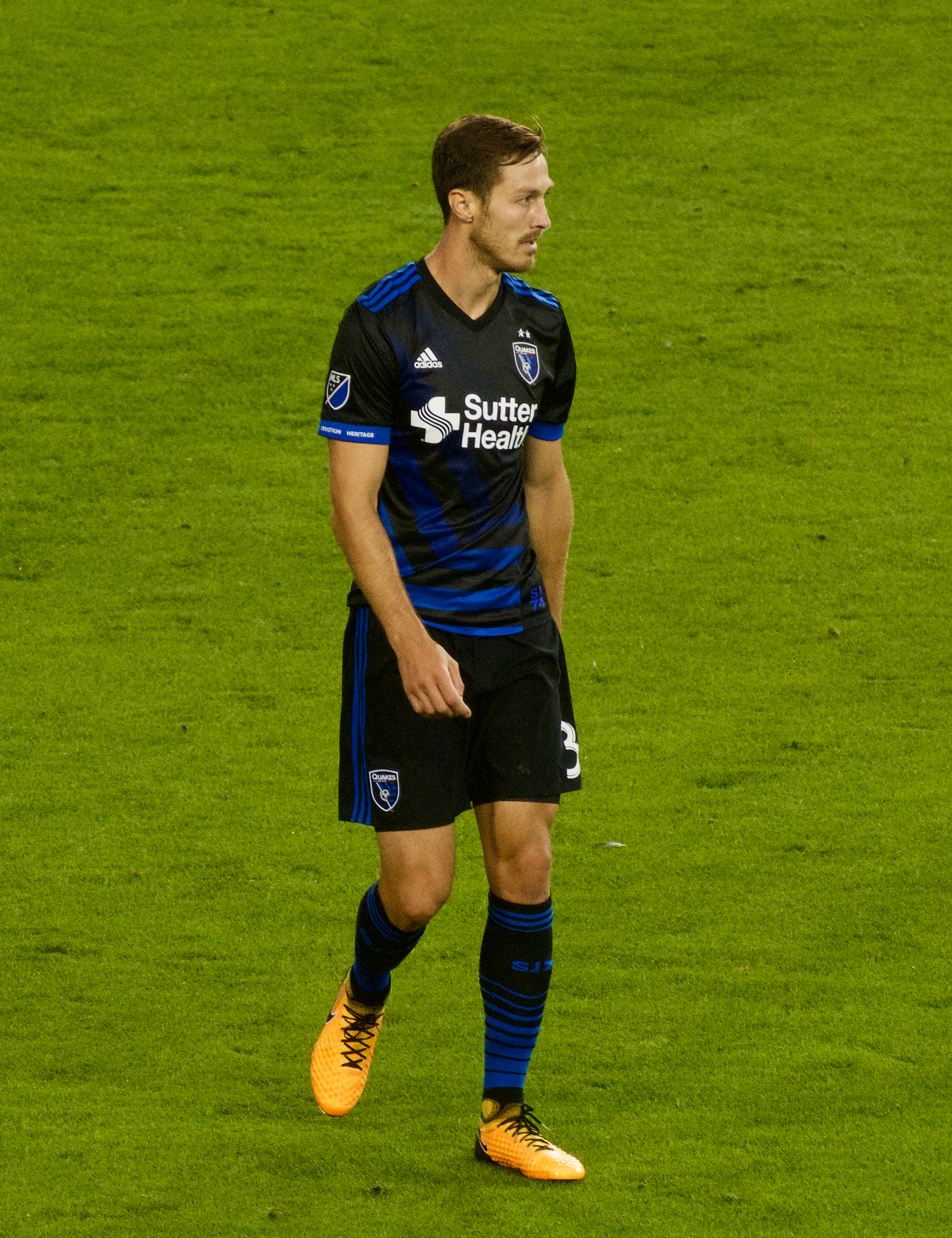
- Playing for San Jose Earthquakes in 2017

Personal information
- Full name: François Jacques Affolter
- Date of birth: 13 March 1991 (age 35)
- Place of birth: Biel/Bienne, Bern, Switzerland
- Height: 1.86 m (6 ft 1 in)
- Position: Centre back

Team information
- Current team: Biel-Bienne
- Number: 2

Youth career
- 2000–2001: Etoile Biel
- 2001–2007: Biel-Bienne
- 2007–2008: Young Boys

Senior career*
Years	Team	Apps	(Gls)
2008	Young Boys II	2	(0)
2008–2014	Young Boys	100	(2)
2012	→ Werder Bremen (loan)	13	(0)
2012	→ Werder Bremen II (loan)	5	(1)
2014–2017	FC Luzern	101	(4)
2017–2019	San Jose Earthquakes	16	(0)
2020	FC Aarau	12	(0)
2020–2021	Chiasso	45	(1)
2022–2024	Biel-Bienne	39	(0)

International career
2008	Switzerland U18	2	(0)
2009	Switzerland U19	3	(0)
2009–2012	Switzerland U21	17	(2)
2012	Switzerland U23	1	(0)
2010–2012	Switzerland	5	(0)
- * Club domestic league appearances and goals as of 26 October 2023

François Affolter (born 13 March 1991) is a retired Swiss professional footballer who most recently played as a defender for Biel-Bienne in the Swiss Promotion League. He was part of the Swiss team at the 2012 Summer Olympics.

== Career ==
=== Young Boys ===
Born in Biel/Bienne, Bern, He made his senior debut for BSC Young Boys at the age of 17 years on 14 September 2008 in a 2–1 victory over AC Bellinzona, replacing Marc Schneider in the starting eleven due to suspension. Since that match, he was a regular starter for the club in their three-man defence, alongside Saif Ghezal and Miguel Alfredo Portillo.

Before he played with the first team, he played with the under 18 team. They won the under 18 championship the same year. Then, he joined the first team for friendly matches in the summer of 2008 and the new Young Boys coach Vladimir Petkovic gave him his chance.

He signed his first professional contract with Young Boys in November 2008. After three seasons with Young Boys, he was loaned to German club Werder Bremen.

After an unsuccessful half year at Young Boys, he decided to transfer to Swiss side FC Luzern for an undisclosed fee. His contract was set to expire in June 2018.

=== San Jose Earthquakes ===
On 21 July 2017, Major League Soccer side San Jose Earthquakes announced it had signed Affolter to a multi-year contract on a free transfer from Luzern. He made his first appearance for San Jose on 9 August, starting in the U.S. Open Cup semifinal against Sporting Kansas City and substituting out during extra time in the 103rd minute. He made his first MLS start and appearance on 12 August in a 3–0 loss to the Houston Dynamo at BBVA Compass Stadium.

=== FC Aarau ===
In February 2020, Affolter joined Swiss Challenge League side FC Aarau until the end of the 2019–20 season.

=== Chiasso ===
In September 2020, free agent Affolter signed with FC Chiasso, also of the Swiss Challenge League.

=== Return to Biel-Bienne ===
On 29 December 2021, Affolter returned to his youth club Biel-Bienne on a 2.5-year contract.

== Personal life ==
Affolter received his U.S. green card in July 2018, which qualifies him as a domestic player for MLS roster purposes.

== Career statistics ==
=== Club ===
As of matches played 15 September 2020

Appearances and goals by club, season and competition
Club	Season	League			Cup		League Cup		Continental		Total	
Club	Season	Division	Apps	Goals	Apps	Goals	Apps	Goals	Apps	Goals	Apps	Goals
Young Boys II	2008–09		2	0	–		–		–		2	0
Young Boys	2008–09	Swiss Super League	22	0	3	0	–		1	0	26	0
Young Boys	2009–10	Swiss Super League	34	1	2	0	–		1	0	37	1
Young Boys	2010–11	Swiss Super League	33	0	4	0	–		12	0	49	0
Young Boys	2011–12	Swiss Super League	5	0	2	1	–		2	0	9	1
Young Boys	2012–13	Swiss Super League	4	0	–		–		–		4	0
Young Boys	2013–14	Swiss Super League	2	1	1	1	–		–		3	2
Young Boys	Total		100	2	12	2	0	0	16	0	128	4
Werder Bremen (loan)	2011–12	Bundesliga	13	0	–		–		–		13	0
Werder Bremen II (loan)	2012–13	Regionalliga Nord	5	1	–		–		–		5	1
FC Luzern	2013–14	Swiss Super League	10	0	1	0	–		–		11	0
FC Luzern	2014–15	Swiss Super League	31	1	3	0	–		2	0	36	1
FC Luzern	2015–16	Swiss Super League	32	1	4	0	–		–		36	1
FC Luzern	2016–17	Swiss Super League	11	0	3	0	–		–		14	0
FC Luzern	Total		84	2	11	0	0	0	2	0	97	2
FC Luzern	2014–15		1	0	–		–		–		1	0
San Jose Earthquakes	2017	MLS	6	0	1 (Note: Appearances in the Lamar Hunt U.S. Open Cup)	0	–		–		2	0
San Jose Earthquakes	2018	MLS	9	0	1	0	0	0	0	0	10	0
San Jose Earthquakes	2019	MLS	1	0	2	0	0	0	0	0	3	0
San Jose Earthquakes	Total		16	0	4	0	0	0	0	0	20	0
FC Aarau	2019–20	Swiss Challenge League	12	0	0	0	–		–		12	0
Career total			233	5	27	2	0	0	18	0	278	7
