= Nikolaj Hänni =

Swiss football referee (born 1976)

Nikolaj Haenni
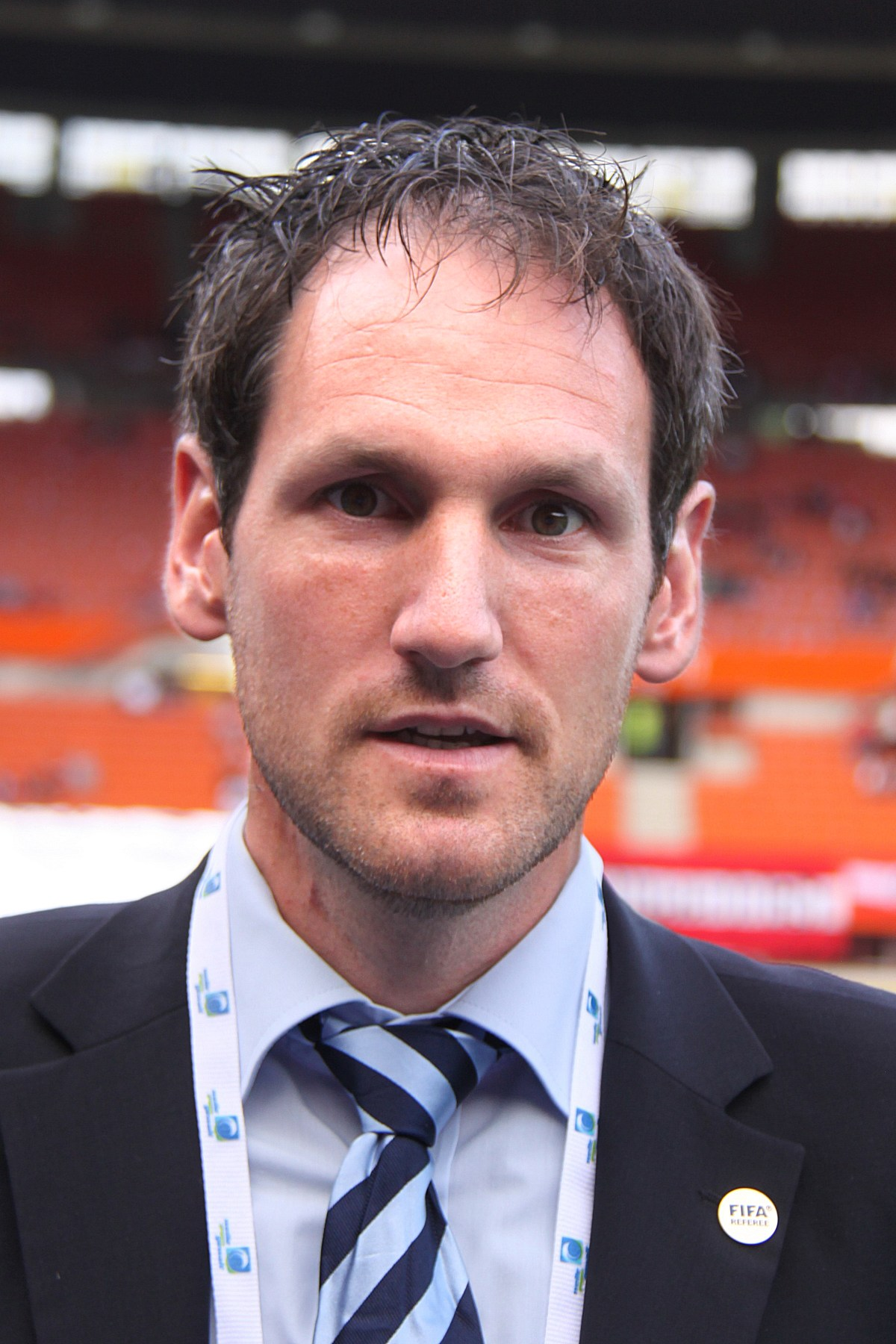
- Born: 2 March 1976 (age 50); Köniz, Switzerland

Domestic
Years	League	Role
2007–	Swiss Super League	Referee

International
Years	League	Role
2011–	FIFA listed	Referee

Nikolaj Haenni (born 2 March 1976) is a Swiss football referee. He refereed his first match in the Swiss Super League on 18 August 2007, when he officiated between F.C. St. Gallen and Neuchâtel Xamax. He has been a FIFA-listed referee since 2011, and is a UEFA category 3 referee.
