= Claudio Holenstein =

Swiss footballer (born 1990)

Personal information
- Full name: Claudio Holenstein
- Date of birth: 10 September 1990 (age 36)
- Place of birth: Wil, Switzerland
- Height: 1.80 m (5 ft 11 in)
- Position: Defensive midfielder

Team information
- Current team: SC Brühl
- Number: 6

Youth career
- –2008: FC Wil 1900

Senior career*
Years	Team	Apps	(Gls)
2008–2014	FC Wil 1900	85	(16)
2009–2010	→ FC Gossau (loan)	24	(2)
2010–2014	FC Wil 1900	118	(23)
2014–2016	FC Luzern	1	(0)
2015	→ FC Wohlen (loan)	15	(0)
2015–2016	→ FC Winterthur (loan)	16	(3)
2016–2017	FC Wacker Innsbruck	17	(1)
2017–	SC Brühl	207	(15)
- * Club domestic league appearances and goals as of 22 June 2025

Claudio Holenstein (born 10 September 1990) is a Swiss footballer who currently plays for SC Brühl.
