= List of football clubs in Switzerland =

This is a list of association football clubs based in Switzerland, sorted by league and division within the Swiss football league system, as of the 2026–27 season. A total of 158 clubs compete in the top five tiers of the Swiss football pyramid, divided as follows:

- Super League (top level with 12 clubs, fully professional)
- Challenge League (second level with 10 clubs, fully professional)
- Promotion League (third level with 18 clubs, mixed semi-professional and amateur)
- 1st League Classic (fourth level with 48 clubs, comprising three regional groups with 16 clubs each, mixed semi-professional and amateur)
- 2nd League Interregional (fifth level with 70 clubs, comprising five regional groups with 14 clubs, amateur)

The Swiss football league system also includes clubs based in Liechtenstein. As of 2022, Liechtenstein has only seven clubs and no domestic league, though a domestic cup is organised annually. All clubs based in Liechtenstein therefore play in the Swiss league pyramid. Of those, only FC Vaduz competes in the fully professional levels of the Swiss league system, presently at the second level.

== Brack Super League ==
Club	City / town
FC Basel	(Basel-Stadt) Basel
Grasshopper Club	(Canton of Zurich) Zürich
Lausanne Sport	(Vaud) Lausanne
FC Lugano	(Ticino) Lugano
FC Luzern	(Canton of Lucerne) Luzern
FC St. Gallen	(Canton of St. Gallen) St. Gallen
Servette FC	(Canton of Geneva) Geneva
FC Sion	(Valais) Sion
FC Thun	(Canton of Bern) Thun
FC Vaduz	(Liechtenstein) Vaduz
BSC Young Boys	(Canton of Bern) Bern
FC Zürich	(Canton of Zurich) Zürich

== Dieci Challenge League ==
Club	City / town
FC Aarau	(Aargau) Aarau
Étoile Carouge	(Canton of Geneva) Carouge
SC Kriens	(Canton of Lucerne) Kriens
Neuchâtel Xamax	(Canton of Neuchâtel) Neuchâtel
FC Rapperswil-Jona	(Canton of St. Gallen) Rapperswil
Stade Lausanne Ouchy	(Vaud) Lausanne
Stade Nyonnais	(Vaud) Nyon
FC Wil	(Canton of St. Gallen) Wil
FC Winterthur	(Canton of Zurich) Winterthur
Yverdon Sport	(Vaud) Yverdon-les-Bains

== Hoval Promotion League ==
Club	City / town
FC Basel II	(Basel-Stadt) Basel
FC Bavois	(Vaud) Bavois
AC Bellinzona	(Ticino) Bellinzona
FC Biel-Bienne	(Canton of Bern) Biel/Bienne
FC Breitenrain Bern	(Canton of Bern) Bern
SC Brühl	(Canton of St. Gallen) St. Gallen
FC Bulle	(Canton of Fribourg) Bulle
SC Cham	(Canton of Zug) Cham
FC Grand-Saconnex	(Canton of Geneva) Le Grand-Saconnex
FC Kreuzlingen	(Thurgau) Kreuzlingen
FC Lausanne-Sport II	(Vaud) Lausanne
FC Lugano II	(Ticino) Lugano
FC Luzern II	(Canton of Lucerne) Luzern
FC Paradiso	(Ticino) Paradiso
FC Schaffhausen	(Canton of Schaffhausen) Schaffhausen
Vevey-Sports	(Vaud) Vevey
BSC Young Boys II	(Canton of Bern) Bern
FC Zürich II	(Canton of Zurich) Zurich

== 1. Liga Classic ==
Fourth level, called 1. Liga Classic, consists of three regional groups with 16 clubs. Group 1 contains teams from western Switzerland, the area called Romandy, which is generally French-speaking. Group 2 contains teams from central Switzerland, which is mostly German-speaking. Group 3 contains teams from eastern Switzerland and Liechtenstein which contains German- and Italian-speaking regions.

=== Group 1 ===
Club	City / town
FC Amical Saint-Prex	(Vaud) Saint-Prex
CS Chênois	(Canton of Geneva) Thônex
FC Coffrane	(Canton of Neuchâtel) Val-de-Ruz
FC Échallens Région	(Vaud) Echallens
FC La Chaux-de-Fonds	(Canton of Neuchâtel) La Chaux-de-Fonds
FC La Sarraz-Eclépens	(Vaud) La Sarraz
Lancy FC	(Canton of Geneva) Lancy
FC Martigny-Sports	(Valais) Martigny
Meyrin FC	(Canton of Geneva) Meyrin
FC Monthey	(Valais) Monthey
FC Oberwallis Naters	(Valais) Naters
FC Portalban-Gletterens	(Canton of Fribourg) Delley-Portalban
FC Prishtina Bern	(Canton of Bern) Bern
Servette FC II	(Canton of Geneva) Geneva
FC Sion II	(Valais) Sion
FC Stade-Payerne	(Vaud) Payerne

=== Group 2 ===
Club	City / town
FC Bassecourt	(Canton of Jura) Bassecourt
FC Besa Biel-Bienne	(Canton of Bern) Biel/Bienne
Black Stars Basel	(Basel-Stadt) Basel
SC Buochs	(Nidwalden) Buochs
Concordia Basel	(Basel-Stadt) Basel
SR Delémont	(Canton of Jura) Delémont
FC Courtételle	(Canton of Jura) Courtételle
Grasshopper Club II	(Canton of Zurich) Zürich
FC Langenthal	(Canton of Bern) Langenthal
FC Münsingen	(Canton of Bern) Münsingen
SV Muttenz	(Basel-Landschaft) Muttenz
BSC Old Boys	(Basel-Stadt) Basel
FC Schötz	(Canton of Lucerne) Schötz
FC Solothurn	(Canton of Solothurn) Solothurn
FC Wohlen	(Aargau) Wohlen
Zug 94	(Canton of Zug) Zug

=== Group 3 ===
Club	City / town
FC Baden	(Aargau) Baden
FC Collilna d'Oro	(Ticino) Collina d'Oro
FC Dietikon	(Canton of Zurich) Dietikon
USV Eschen/Mauren	(Liechtenstein) Eschen
FC Freienbach	(Canton of Schwyz) Freienbach
SV Höngg	(Canton of Zurich) Zürich
FC Kosova	(Canton of Zurich) Zürich
FC Mendrisio	(Ticino) Mendrisio
SV Schaffhausen	(Canton of Schaffhausen) Schaffhausen
FC St. Gallen II	(Canton of St. Gallen) St. Gallen
AC Taverne	(Ticino) Torricella-Taverne
FC Tuggen	(Canton of Schwyz) Tuggen
FC Wettswil-Bonstetten	(Canton of Zurich) Wettswil am Albis
FC Widnau	(Canton of St. Gallen) Widnau
FC Winterthur II	(Canton of Zurich) Winterthur
YF Juventus	(Canton of Zurich) Zürich

== 2. Liga Interregional ==
Fifth level, called 2. Liga Interregional, consists of five regional groups with 14 clubs. Group 1 contains teams from southwestern Switzerland, Group 2 contains teams from western Switzerland, Group 3 contains teams from west-central and southern Switzerland and Group 4 contains teams from northern Switzerland and Group 5 contains teams from eastern Switzerland along with teams from Liechtenstein.

=== Group 1 ===
Club	City / town
FC Champagne Sports	(Vaud) Champagne
FC Collex-Bossy	(Canton of Geneva) Collex-Bossy
Concordia Lausanne	(Vaud) Lausanne
Dardania Lausanne	(Vaud) Lausanne
FC Echichens	(Vaud) Echichens
Olympique de Genève	(Canton of Geneva) Geneva
Pully Football	(Vaud) Pully
Signal FC Bernex-Confignon	(Canton of Geneva) Bernex
Stade Lausanne Ouchy II	(Vaud) Lausanne
US Terre Sainte	(Vaud) Commugny
UGS Genève	(Canton of Geneva) Geneva
USI Azzurri	(Canton of Geneva) Geneva
FC Vernier	(Canton of Geneva) Vernier
Yverdon-Sport FC II	(Vaud) Yverdon-les-Bains

=== Group 2 ===
Club	City / town
Bosna Neuchâtel	(Canton of Neuchâtel) Neuchâtel
FC Bosporus	(Canton of Bern) Ostermundigen
FC Cugy-Montet-Aumont	(Vaud) Cugy
SC Düdingen	(Canton of Fribourg) Düdingen
FC Farvagny-Ogoz	(Canton of Fribourg) Farvagny
AS Italiana	(Canton of Bern) Bern
FC Köniz	(Canton of Bern) Köniz
SV Lyss	(Canton of Bern) Lyss
FC Muri-Gümligen	(Canton of Bern) Muri bei Bern
CS Romontois	(Canton of Fribourg) Romont
FC Saint-Blaise	(Canton of Neuchâtel) Saint-Blaise
FC Savièse	(Valais) Savièse
FC Thun II	(Canton of Bern) Thun
FC Ueberstorf	(Canton of Fribourg) Ueberstorf

=== Group 3 ===
Club	City / town
FC Ajoie-Montierri	(Canton of Jura) Cornol
FC Allschwil	(Basel-Landschaft) Allschwil
SC Binningen	(Basel-Landschaft) Binningen
FC Bülach	(Canton of Zurich) Bülach
SC Dornach	(Canton of Solothurn) Dornach
FC Dübendorf	(Canton of Zurich) Dübendorf
FC Kirchberg Bern	(Canton of Bern) Kirchberg
FC Lachen-Altendorf	(Canton of Schwyz) Lachen
FC Liestal	(Basel-Landschaft) Liestal
FC Pratteln	(Basel-Landschaft) Pratteln
Red Star Zürich	(Canton of Zurich) Zürich
FC Thalwil	(Canton of Zurich) Thalwil
FC Uster	(Canton of Zurich) Uster
Zurich City SC	(Canton of Zurich) Zurich

=== Group 4 ===
Club	City / town
AS Castello	(Ticino) Castel San Pietro
SC Cham II	(Canton of Zug) Cham
SC Emmen	(Canton of Lucerne) Emmen
FC Emmenbrücke	(Canton of Lucerne) Emmen
FC Gambarogno-Contone	(Ticino) Gambarogno
FC Härkingen	(Canton of Solothurn) Härkingen
FC Hergiswil	(Nidwalden) Hergiswil
FC Ibach	(Canton of Schwyz) Ibach
FC Klingnau	(Aargau) Klingnau
FC Locarno	(Ticino) Locarno
FC Malcantone	(Ticino) Caslano
FC Rothrist	(Aargau) Rothrist
FC Rotkreuz	(Canton of Zug) Rotkreuz
FC Sursee	(Canton of Lucerne) Sursee

=== Group 5 ===
Club	City / town
FC Allstätten	(Canton of St. Gallen) Altstätten
FC Arbon 05	(Thurgau) Arbon
FC Balzers	(Liechtenstein) Balzers
FC Chur 97	(Grisons) Chur
KF Dardania St. Gallen	(Canton of St. Gallen) St. Gallen
FC Gossau	(Canton of St. Gallen) Gossau
FC Linth 04	(Canton of Glarus) Niederurnen
FC Rorschach-Goldach 17	(Canton of St. Gallen) Goldach
FC Schaffhausen II	(Canton of Schaffhausen) Schaffhausen
Seefeld Zürich	(Canton of Zurich) Zurich
FC Seuzach	(Canton of Zurich) Seuzach
Uzwil	(Canton of St. Gallen) Uzwil
FC Weesen	(Canton of St. Gallen) Weesen
FC Wil II	(Canton of St. Gallen) Wil

== Alphabetical list ==
- Bold: Will compete in the top tier

=== A ===
- FC Aarau - Challenge League
- FC Alle - (3. Liga)
- FC Arbon 05 - 2. Liga Interregional
- FC Amical Saint-Prex - 1. Liga Classic
- FC Amicitia Riehen - 2. Liga

=== B ===
- FC Baden - 1. Liga Classic
- FC Balzers - (2. Liga IR)
- Black Stars Basel - 1. Liga Classic
- FC Concordia Basel - 1. Liga Classic
- Excelsior Basel - (-)
- **FC Basel** - Super League
- Fortuna Basel - (-)
- FC Nordstern Basel - (2. Liga IR)
- BSC Old Boys - 1. Liga Classic
- FC Baulmes - (-)
- FC Bavois - Promotion League
- FC Bazenheid - (2. Liga IR)
- ES Belfaux - (-)
- AC Bellinzona - Challenge League
- FC Bern 1894 - (2. Liga)
- Weissenbühl Bern - (-)
- **BSC Young Boys** - Super League
- FC Besa Biel-Bienne - 1. Liga Classic
- FC Bex - (-)
- GC Biaschesi - (-)
- FC Biel-Bienne - Promotion League
- Floria Biel - (-)
- SC Binningen - (2. Liga IR)
- Breitenrain - Promotion League
- FC Brugg - (3. Liga)
- SC Brühl - Promotion League
- FC Bülach - (2. Liga IR)
- FC Bulle - Promotion League
- SC Bümpliz 78 - (3. Liga)
- SC Buochs - 1. Liga Classic

=== C ===
- Étoile Carouge FC - Challenge League
- SC Cham - Promotion League
- CS Chênois - 1. Liga Classic
- FC Chiasso - Dissolved
- FC Chur 97 - 2. Liga Interregional
- FC Colombier - (3. Liga)
- FC Cortaillod - (-)

=== D ===
- SR Delémont - 1. Liga Classic
- FC Diepoldsau Schmitter - (3. Liga)
- SC Dornach - 2. Liga Interregional
- SC Düdingen - 2. Liga Interregional
- FC Dürrenast - (2. Liga)

=== E ===
- FC Échallens Région - 1. Liga Classic
- FC Emmenbrücke - 2. Liga Interregional
- USV Eschen/Mauren - 1. Liga Classic

=== F ===
- FC Frauenfeld - (2. Liga)
- FC Freienbach - 1. Liga Classic
- FC Fribourg - (3. Liga)

=== G ===
- Le Château de Lancy Geneva - (-)
- La Châtelaine Geneva - (-)
- FC Geneva - (-)
- Racing Club Genève - (-)
- Geneva United - (-)
- Urania Genève Sport - 2. Liga Interregional
- FC Gingins - (3. Liga)
- SC Goldau - (2. Liga IR)
- FC Grand Lancy - (2. Liga IR)
- FC Grand-Saconnex - Promotion League
- **Grasshopper Club** - Super League
- FC Grenchen - 1. Liga Classic
- FC Gumefens Sorens - (2. Liga IR)
- FC Gspon - (-)

=== H ===
- FC Hakoah - (5. Liga)
- FC Herisau - (3. Liga)
- FC Herzogenbuchsee - (2. Liga)
- FC Hochdorf (2. Liga)
- SV Höngg - 1. Liga Classic

=== I ===
- FC Ibach - 2. Liga Interregional
- FC Iliria - (2. Liga)

=== K ===
- SC Kriens - Promotion League
- FC Kreuzlingen - Promotion League
- FC Küsnacht - (2. Liga)

=== L ===
- Etoile Sporting La Chaux-de-Fonds - (3. Liga)
- FC La Chaux-de-Fonds - 1. Liga Classic
- Lancy FC - 1. Liga Classic
- FC Langenthal - (2. Liga IR)
- Lausanne Football and Cricket Club - (-)
- Montriond Lausanne - (-)
- Racing Lausanne - (-)
- FC Le Mont Lausanne - 1. Liga Classic
- **Lausanne Sport** - Super League
- La Villa Longchamp Lausanne - (-)
- Villa d'Ouchy Lausanne - (-)
- FC Liestal - (2. Liga IR)
- FC Linth 04 - (2. Liga IR)
- FC Locarno - (2.liga IR)
- Losone Sportiva - (2. Liga IR)
- **FC Lugano** - Super League
- **FC Luzern** - Super League
- FC Kickers Lucerne - (2. Liga IR)

=== M ===
- AC Malcantone - (2. Liga IR)
- Etoile Sportive FC Malley - 1. Liga Classic
- FC Martigny Sports - 1. Liga Classic
- FC Massongex - (2. Liga IR)
- FC Mendrisio Stabio - 1. Liga Classic
- FC Meyrin - 1. Liga Classic
- FC Monthey - 1. Liga Classic
- Montreux Narcisse - (-)
- Montreux Sports - (2. Liga)
- FC Moutier - (2. Liga IR)
- FC Münsingen - 1. Liga Classic
- SV Muttenz - 1. Liga Classic

=== N ===
- FC Naters - 1. Liga Classic
- Cantonal Neuchâtel - (-)
- FC Neuchâtel - (-)
- Neuchâtel Xamax - Challenge League

=== O ===
- FC Olten - 1. Liga Classic

=== P ===
- FC Paradiso - Promotion League
- FC Perly Certoux - (2. Liga IR)
- FC Plan Les Ouates - (2. Liga IR)
- FC Portalban Gletterens - (2. Liga IR)
- FC Porrentruy - (2. Liga IR)

=== R ===
- FC Rapperswil-Jona - Challenge League
- FC Raron - (2. Liga IR)
- SAR Rivera - (2. Liga IR)
- CS Romontois - (2. Liga IR)
- FC Küssnacht am Rigi - (2. Liga IR)

=== S ===
- FC Sarnen - (2. Liga IR)
- FC Savièse - (2. Liga IR)
- Stade Lausanne Ouchy - Challenge League
- Blue Stars St. Gallen - (-)
- Brühl St. Gallen - (2. Liga IR)
- **FC St. Gallen** - Super League
- **Servette FC** - Super League
- FC Schaffhausen - Promotion League
- SC Schöftland - (2. Liga IR)
- FC Schötz - 1. Liga Classic
- Signal FC - (2. Liga IR)
- **FC Sion** - Super League
- FC Solothurn - 1. Liga Classic
- FC Stäfa - (2. Liga IR)
- FC Sursee - (2. Liga IR)

=== T ===
- **FC Thun** - Super League
- FC Thalwil - (2. Liga IR)
- FC Tuggen - 1. Liga Classic
- FC Turgi - (4. Liga)

=== U ===
- Union Sportive Terre Sainte - (2. Liga IR)

=== V ===
- Maison Neuve Vevey - (-)
- Vevey-Sports - Promotion League
- Veyrier Sports - (2. Liga IR)

=== W ===
- FC Wädenswil - (2. Liga IR)
- FC Wangen bei Olten - (-)
- FC Wettingen - (2. Liga IR)
- FC Widnau - 1. Liga Classic
- FC Wil - Challenge League
- **FC Winterthur** - Super League
- VFC Winterthur-Veltheim - (see FC Winterthur)
- SC Veltheim - (-)
- FC Töss - (2. Liga)
- FC Wohlen - 1. Liga Classic

=== Y ===
- YF Juventus - 1. Liga Classic
- Concordia Yverdon - (Dissolve)
- Yverdon Sport - Challenge League

=== Z ===
- SC Zofingen - 2. Liga
- Zug 94 - 1. Liga Classic
- American Wanderers Zürich - (-)
- Anglo-American Club Zürich - (-)
- FC Blue Stars Zürich (2. Liga IR)
- Fire Flies Zürich - (-)
- Fortuna Zürich (-)
- Inter Club Zürich - (5. Liga)
- Kickers Zürich - (-)
- Neumünster Zürich - (4. Liga)
- FC Seefeld Zürich - (2. Liga IR)
- **FC Zürich** - Super League
- Zürich City SC - 2. Liga Interregional
