= 2026–27 2. Liga Interregional =

2. Liga Interregional
- Season: 2026–27
- Dates: 21 August 2026 –
- Matches: 450
- Goals: 1,656 (3.68 per match)
- Biggest home win: Old Boys 9–0 Klingnau (29 August 2026)
- Biggest away win: Altstätten 0–11 Seefeld ZH (23 August 2026)
- Highest scoring: Altstätten 0–11 Seefeld ZH (23 August 2026)
- Longest winning run: 11 matches Seefeld ZH
- Longest unbeaten run: 13 matches Seefeld ZH
- Longest winless run: 13 matches Sierre; Uster
- Longest losing run: 8 matches Gumefens/Sorens
- All statistics correct as of 15 November 2026.

The 2026–27 2. Liga Interregional is the 2. Liga Interregional season, the fifth tier of the Swiss football league system.

== Team changes ==
=== Relegated from 2025–26 1. Liga Classic ===
- Besa Biel/Bienne
- BSC Old Boys
- Höngg
- La Sarraz-Éclépens
- Martigny-Sports
- Schaffhausen

== League tables ==
=== Group 1 ===
Pos	Team	Pld	W	D	L	GF	GA	GD	Pts	Qualification
1	Stade-Lausanne-Ouchy II	13	7	4	2	29	14	+15	25	Promoted to the 2027–28 Swiss 1. Liga Classic
2	Martigny-Sports	13	7	3	3	26	13	+13	24	
3	Veyrier Sports	13	7	3	3	25	12	+13	24	
4	Terre Sainte	12	8	0	4	28	27	+1	24	
5	Vernier	12	5	3	4	22	20	+2	18	
6	Bernex-Confignon	13	5	3	5	19	21	−2	18	
7	Collex-Bossy	12	5	2	5	25	22	+3	17	
8	Pully	13	4	4	5	31	24	+7	16	
9	Concordia LS	13	4	3	6	19	21	−2	15	
10	Savièse	13	4	3	6	16	25	−9	15	
11	Racing Club Lausanne (Note: Three points deducted.)	13	6	0	7	27	37	−10	15	
12	Urania Genève Sport	12	3	3	6	16	18	−2	12	Relegated to the 2. Liga
13	Vignoble	13	2	6	5	13	21	−8	12	Relegated to the 2. Liga
14	Sierre	13	0	7	6	11	32	−21	7	Relegated to the 2. Liga

Updated to match(es) played on 15 November 2026. Source: Amateur Liga

==== Results ====
Home \ Away	TER	SLO	VER	MAR	VEY	COL	PUL	RCL	BER	SAV	CLS	VIG	URA	SIE
Terre Sainte	—				1–3	1–4	2–1			3–2	4–3	2–0		
Stade-Lausanne-Ouchy II	3–0	—	3–0		2–1		1–1	7–2		2–0		2–3		
Vernier			—			4–4			3–0	3–2	0–2	3–0		0–0
Martigny-Sports	1–2	1–1	2–0	—			1–2	3–0					2–2	
Veyrier Sports			1–1	2–0	—		4–3		0–1	1–1				6–0
Collex-Bossy		3–1		0–3	0–1	—			2–3		0–1			3–1
Pully			1–3			3–3	—			5–1	3–1	2–2		2–2
Racing Club Lausanne	3–4		4–2		0–3	0–3	0–7	—		4–0		3–0		
Bernex-Confignon	4–0	1–4		1–2			2–1	5–2	—				0–4	
Savièse				1–3		3–1			1–0	—	2–1	1–1		1–1
Concordia LS		1–1		0–3	3–1			3–4	0–0		—		1–1	3–1
Vignoble				1–1	0–0	1–2			2–2		1–0	—	1–2	1–1
Urania Genève Sport	2–3	0–1	1–3		0–2		2–0	0–2		0–1			—	
Sierre	1–6	1–1		1–4				0–3	0–0				2–2	—

Updated to match(es) played on 15 November 2026. Source: Amateur Liga
Legend: Blue = home team win; Yellow = draw; Red = away team win.

=== Group 2 ===
Pos	Team	Pld	W	D	L	GF	GA	GD	Pts	Qualification
1	Champagne Sports	13	10	0	3	26	10	+16	30	Promoted to the 2027–28 Swiss 1. Liga Classic
2	Cugy-Montet-Aumont-Murist	13	9	2	2	23	11	+12	29	
3	Farvagny/Ogoz	13	9	1	3	44	14	+30	28	
4	Bosna Neuchâtel	13	9	0	4	28	14	+14	27	
5	Düdingen	13	7	2	4	23	17	+6	23	
6	Ajoie-Monterri	13	6	2	5	22	20	+2	20	
7	Romontois	13	6	2	5	28	29	−1	20	
8	Grenchen 15	12	6	1	5	19	12	+7	19	
9	Haute-Ajoie	13	3	4	6	19	29	−10	13	
10	Yverdon-Sport II	12	4	0	8	23	29	−6	12	
11	Saint-Blaise	13	3	2	8	16	25	−9	11	
12	Bôle	13	3	2	8	14	25	−11	11	Relegated to the 2. Liga
13	Besa Biel/Bienne	13	3	2	8	17	30	−13	11	Relegated to the 2. Liga
14	Gumefens/Sorens	13	2	0	11	11	48	−37	6	Relegated to the 2. Liga

Updated to match(es) played on 15 November 2026. Source: Amateur Liga

==== Results ====
Home \ Away	FAR	CUG	CHA	BOS	AJO	GRE	DUD	ROM	HAU	YVE	BOL	SBL	GUM	BES
Farvagny/Ogoz	—	1–2		2–1				8–0	2–2	6–2		2–1		5–1
Cugy-Montet-Aumont-Murist		—	2–1		1–0	0–1	1–2				2–0	1–0		
Champagne Sports	3–1		—	1–0				3–1	0–1	3–1			2–1	
Bosna Neuchâtel		0–2		—	4–2		0–1			4–2				4–1
Ajoie-Monterri	1–3		1–0		—	3–1		1–1			0–2		3–0	3–2
Grenchen 15	1–0		0–1	0–1		—		3–2			2–0		4–1	
Düdingen	0–4		1–3		2–2	1–0	—				1–2		6–0	2–1
Romontois		2–2		1–2			1–0	—	4–5	4–1		3–2		4–0
Haute-Ajoie		1–1		1–3	0–3	1–1	1–1		—	3–6		1–2		
Yverdon-Sport II		2–3			2–0		2–3			—	1–0	0–1		
Bôle	0–2		1–5	0–3				1–2	1–2		—		4–2	
Saint-Blaise			0–2	0–2	2–3	0–5	0–3				2–2	—	5–0	1–1
Gumefens/Sorens	0–8	0–4		1–4				1–3	2–0	2–1			—	1–4
Besa Biel/Bienne		1–2	0–2			2–1			3–1	0–3	1–1			—

Updated to match(es) played on 15 November 2026. Source: Amateur Liga
Legend: Blue = home team win; Yellow = draw; Red = away team win.

=== Group 3 ===
Pos	Team	Pld	W	D	L	GF	GA	GD	Pts	Qualification
1	Zürich City	13	10	2	1	43	15	+28	32	Promoted to the 2027–28 Swiss 1. Liga Classic
2	Old Boys	13	10	1	2	45	16	+29	31	
3	Liestal	13	6	5	2	32	21	+11	23	
4	Dornach	13	6	3	4	34	26	+8	21	
5	Kirchberg	13	7	0	6	23	29	−6	21	
6	Allschwil	13	6	2	5	24	23	+1	20	
7	Binningen	13	5	2	6	19	24	−5	17	
8	Baden II	13	5	2	6	28	35	−7	17	
9	Rothrist	13	5	1	7	24	27	−3	16	
10	Klingnau	13	4	4	5	30	42	−12	16	
11	Bern 1894	13	4	2	7	18	26	−8	14	
12	Köniz	13	4	1	8	24	28	−4	13	Relegated to the 2. Liga
13	Italiana	13	3	1	9	16	25	−9	10	Relegated to the 2. Liga
14	Kleinhüningen	13	3	0	10	19	42	−23	9	Relegated to the 2. Liga

Updated to match(es) played on 14 November 2026. Source: Amateur Liga

==== Results ====
Home \ Away	OLD	ZUR	KIR	DOR	LIE	BAD	BIN	ROT	ALL	KOE	ITA	KLE	KLI	BER
Old Boys	—	1–4	4–2		3–1		5–2		3–0	4–0			9–0	
Zürich City		—	6–0			3–1			4–1	3–1		1–2	3–3	2–0
Kirchberg			—			2–1			1–2	1–4	2–1	4–1	4–1	1–0
Dornach	2–3	2–4	5–2	—	1–1	5–3	1–1	3–2						
Liestal		3–3	4–1		—				1–0	3–1		6–1	2–2	4–4
Baden II	2–2				3–3	—	1–3		4–0			4–3		3–2
Binningen		0–3	0–2		0–1		—		1–0	4–2		2–1	2–3	
Rothrist	0–3	1–4	0–1		2–1	1–3	2–2	—	3–5				4–1	
Allschwil				2–0					—		5–1			
Köniz				1–3		5–2		1–3	1–2	—	0–1	3–0		3–0
Italiana	2–0	0–3		3–3	0–2	0–1	0–1	1–3			—			
Kleinhüningen	1–5			0–5				0–2	0–3		3–1	—		4–1
Klingnau				2–3		6–0			3–3	2–2	0–6	5–3	—	2–1
Bern 1894	0–3			2–1			3–1	2–1	1–1		2–0			—

Updated to match(es) played on 14 November 2026. Source: Amateur Liga
Legend: Blue = home team win; Yellow = draw; Red = away team win.

=== Group 4 ===
Pos	Team	Pld	W	D	L	GF	GA	GD	Pts	Qualification
1	Rotkreuz	13	8	2	3	23	16	+7	26	Promoted to the 2027–28 Swiss 1. Liga Classic
2	Emmen	13	8	1	4	31	15	+16	25	
3	Gambarogno	13	7	3	3	25	14	+11	24	
4	Lachen/Altendorf	13	7	2	4	29	25	+4	23	
5	Sursee	13	6	3	4	23	19	+4	21	
6	Chiasso	13	6	3	4	17	18	−1	21	
7	Ibach	13	6	2	5	24	24	0	20	
8	Malcantone	13	6	1	6	15	21	−6	19	
9	Cham II	13	6	0	7	26	20	+6	18	
10	Red Star ZH	13	5	2	6	18	19	−1	17	
11	Oetwil-Geroldswil	13	5	1	7	21	21	0	16	
12	Goldau	13	4	3	6	12	21	−9	15	Relegated to the 2. Liga
13	Höngg	13	4	2	7	26	23	+3	14	Relegated to the 2. Liga
14	Uster	13	0	1	12	8	42	−34	1	Relegated to the 2. Liga

Updated to match(es) played on 14 November 2026. Source: Amateur Liga

==== Results ====
Home \ Away	ROT	EMM	GAM	IBA	RED	CHM	SUR	LAC	CHI	MAL	OET	GOL	HON	UST
Rotkreuz	—					1–0		2–0	2–1	1–2	1–0		2–1	
Emmen	3–0	—		6–1		0–3		1–2	2–0		5–1	1–2		
Gambarogno	2–5	1–1	—	1–0				2–2	1–2		1–0	3–0		
Ibach	1–2			—		3–1		2–1	1–2	2–2	2–0	1–1		
Red Star ZH	4–2	0–2	0–1	1–3	—		1–3							1–0
Cham II			0–3		2–3	—	3–2			5–0		2–0	3–0	4–0
Sursee	1–1	2–1	0–2	1–5			—	1–2	1–1			2–0		
Lachen/Altendorf					1–1	4–1		—	5–1	2–0	1–7		3–2	
Chiasso					0–1	2–1			—	2–0	2–2		3–2	1–0
Malcantone		0–2	2–1		2–1		0–1			—		3–0	1–0	2–1
Oetwil-Geroldswil					0–3	2–1	0–2			3–1	—	3–0	1–2	2–0
Goldau	0–3				1–1			4–1	0–0			—	2–0	2–1
Höngg		2–3	1–1	5–1	2–1		2–2						—	7–0
Uster	1–1	1–4	1–6	1–2			1–5	1–5						—

Updated to match(es) played on 14 November 2026. Source: Amateur Liga
Legend: Blue = home team win; Yellow = draw; Red = away team win.

=== Group 5 ===
Pos	Team	Pld	W	D	L	GF	GA	GD	Pts	Qualification
1	Seefeld ZH	13	12	1	0	49	7	+42	37	Promoted to the 2027–28 Swiss 1. Liga Classic
2	Dardania St. Gallen	13	8	2	3	33	19	+14	26	
3	Stäfa 1895	13	8	1	4	27	21	+6	25	
4	Rorschach-Goldach 17	13	7	2	4	23	19	+4	23	
5	Altstätten	13	7	0	6	33	41	−8	21	
6	Linth 04	13	6	2	5	27	25	+2	20	
7	Schaffhausen II	13	6	1	6	24	30	−6	19	
8	Uzwil	12	5	1	6	23	23	0	16	
9	Ruggell	12	4	3	5	19	17	+2	15	
10	Balzers	12	5	0	7	26	28	−2	15	
11	Weesen	13	4	1	8	21	30	−9	13	
12	Frauenfeld	13	3	2	8	18	32	−14	11	Relegated to the 2. Liga
13	SV Schaffhausen	13	3	1	9	17	24	−7	10	Relegated to the 2. Liga
14	Seuzach	12	1	3	8	19	43	−24	6	Relegated to the 2. Liga

Updated to match(es) played on 15 November 2026. Source: Amateur Liga

==== Results ====
Home \ Away	SEE	ROR	DAR	STA	BAL	UZW	LIN	WEE	ALT	RUG	SC2	SVS	FRA	SEU
Seefeld ZH	—			2–0	5–1		2–0	3–0				6–0		7–0
Rorschach-Goldach 17	0–1	—	3–2			2–1				1–1	4–0	2–1	3–1	
Dardania St. Gallen	1–1		—	0–1	4–1		2–1			1–0	4–0			
Stäfa 1895		1–2		—		3–2			4–3	1–3	2–3		3–0	
Balzers		4–1		1–2	—		5–0		5–3				5–0	
Uzwil	2–4		1–5			—		4–0		1–1	3–1	3–1		1–0
Linth 04		2–0		1–3		3–2	—		5–1	3–2			2–2	
Weesen		1–1	3–4	1–3	3–1		1–0	—	4–2					4–0
Altstätten	0–11	4–0	4–2			3–2			—	3–2	3–0		3–2	
Ruggell	1–2				3–2			1–0		—	3–0	1–1		
Schaffhausen II	0–2				4–0		3–3	3–1			—	2–0		5–4
SV Schaffhausen			1–2	0–1	3–0		0–1	5–1	0–1			—		4–1
Frauenfeld	2–3		0–3			0–1		3–2		2–1	1–3	3–1	—	
Seuzach		0–4	3–3	3–3	0–1		2–6		4–3				2–2	—

Updated to match(es) played on 15 November 2026. Source: Amateur Liga
Legend: Blue = home team win; Yellow = draw; Red = away team win.
