= 2025–26 Swiss Cup qualification =

Tournament details
- Country: Switzerland

The qualification process for the 2025–26 Swiss Cup was held during the 2024–25 season to select teams that did not automatically qualify through league standing or automatic qualification.

== 1. Liga Classic ==
=== Round 1 ===
The first round began on 10 August 2024.

10 August 2024	Lancy FC	5–3 (a.e.t.)	CS Chênois
20:00		Report

11 August 2024	FC Dietikon	2–2 (a.e.t.) (3–5 p)	FC Schötz
15:00		Report

11 August 2024	FC Kreuzlingen	2–3 (a.e.t.)	FC Wettswil-Bonstetten
15:00		Report

11 August 2024	SV Schaffhausen	3–0	FC Rotkreuz
16:00		Report

11 August 2024	AC Taverne	3–0	FC Freienbach
16:00		Report

11 August 2024	FC Linth 04	3–4 (a.e.t.)	SC YF Juventus
16:00		Report

11 August 2024	SV Höngg	0–3	FC Concordia Basel
16:00		Report

11 August 2024	FC Uzwil	0–2	FC Collina d'Oro
16:00		Report

11 August 2024	FC Solothurn	2–2 (4–5 p)	FC La Sarraz-Eclépens
16:00		Report

11 August 2024	FC Courtételle	1–1 (a.e.t.) (4–3 p)	FC Münsingen
16:00		Report

11 August 2024	FC Köniz	1–2	FC Naters Oberwallis
16:00		Report

11 August 2024	FC Bassecourt	3–1 (a.e.t.)	Meyrin FC
16:00		Report

11 August 2024	SV Muttenz	0–2	FC Mendrisio
17:00		Report

11 August 2024	FC Wohlen	1–0 (a.e.t.)	FC Tuggen
17:00		Report

11 August 2024	FC La Chaux-de-Fonds	0–2	FC Prishtina Bern
17:00		Report

11 August 2024	FC Stade-Payerne	2–0	FC Besa Biel/Bienne
17:00		Report

11 August 2024	FC Monthey	0–1	FC Echallens Région
17:00		Report

20 August 2024	FC Coffrane	1–3	FC Portalban/Gletterens
14:30		Report

20 August 2024	FC Langenthal	3–1 (a.e.t.)	FC Kosova
15:00		Report

=== Round 2 ===
The second and final round began on 15 March 2025.

15 March 2025	FC Bassecourt	1–2 (a.e.t.)	FC La Sarraz-Eclépens
15:00		Report

15 March 2025	FC Wettswil-Bonstetten	3–0	FC Portalban/Gletterens
16:00		Report

15 March 2025	SC YF Juventus	1–2 (a.e.t.)	FC Mendrisio
16:00		Report

15 March 2025	FC Echallens Région	3–1	FC Collina d'Oro
16:00		Report

15 March 2025	FC Schötz	1–2	FC Concordia Basel
16:00		Report

15 March 2025	FC Langenthal	0–1	SV Schaffhausen
16:30		Report

15 March 2025	Lancy FC	0–3 (a.e.t.)	FC Stade-Payerne
17:00		Report

15 March 2025	FC Prishtina Bern	4–3	FC Black Stars
19:00		Report

16 March 2025	FC Courtételle	4–0	FC Naters Oberwallis
14:30		Report

16 March 2025	AC Taverne	1–2	FC Wohlen
15:00		Report

== 2. Liga Interregional ==
=== Round 1 ===
The first round began on 11 August 2024.

10 August 2024	FC Red Star ZH	2–0	FC Widnau
15:00		Report

10 August 2024	FC Thalwil	2–2 (6–5 p)	FC Seefeld ZH
16:00		Report

10 August 2024	Chur 97	3–1	FC Ibach
16:00		Report

10 August 2024	FC Frauenfeld	4–1	SC Goldau
16:00		Report

10 August 2024	SC Düdingen	2–3	CS Romontois
16:30		Report

10 August 2024	US Terre Sainte	6–2	Olympique de Genève FC
17:00		Report

10 August 2024	FC Concordia LS	2–2 (a.e.t.)	Signal FC Bernex-Confignon
17:00		Report

10 August 2024	FC Collex-Bossy	4–1	FC Martigny-Sports
17:00		Report

10 August 2024	FC Rothrist	4–0	SV Lyss
17:00		Report

10 August 2024	FC Ajoie-Monterri	3–2	FC Allschwil
17:00		Report

10 August 2024	Zug 94	2–1	SC Emmen
18:00		Report

10 August 2024	FC Malcantone	3–1 (a.e.t.)	FC Emmenbrücke
18:00		Report

10 August 2024	SC Buochs	2–0	FC Bülach
18:00		Report

10 August 2024	FC Muri	3–0	BSC Old Boys
18:00		Report

10 August 2024	KF Dardania St. Gallen	0–1	FC Sursee
19:00		Report

10 August 2024	FC Gambarogno-Contone	0–1	FC Dübendorf
20:00		Report

10 August 2024	FC Locarno	4–0	FC Brunnen
20:00		Report

11 August 2024	FC Lommiswil	3–2	FC Pratteln
12:00		Report

11 August 2024	SC Binningen	2–0	FC Tavannes/Tramelan
14:00		Report

11 August 2024	FC Altstätten	5–3	FC Arbon 05
14:30		Report

11 August 2024	FC Echichens	4–2	FC Stade-Lausanne-Ouchy
15:00		Report

11 August 2024	FC Ueberstorf	1–0	FC Châtel-St-Denis
15:30		Report

=== Round 2 ===
The second round began on 20 November 2024 and 8 March 2025.

20 November 2024	Pully Football	2–5	US Terre Sainte
20:00		Report

20 November 2024	FC Dübendorf	1–5	FC Uster
20:00		Report

20 November 2024	FC Thalwil	1–3	FC Sursee
20:15		Report

23 November 2024	FC Bosporus	1–1 (4–2 p)	FC Muri-Gümligen
16:00		Report

24 November 2024	FC Vernier	5–1	FC Collex-Bossy
14:00		Report

24 November 2024	Chur 97	3–4 (a.e.t.)	FC Malcantone
14:00		Report

24 November 2024	FC Amical Saint-Prex	3–2	FC Echichens
14:30		Report

28 November 2024	SC Binningen	1–1 (5–4 p)	SC Dornach
20:00		Report

15 February 2025	FC Ueberstorf	2–0	FC Farvagny/Ogoz
17:00		Report

7 March 2025	FC Rothrist	1–3	FC Ajoie-Monterri
20:15		Report

8 March 2025	FC Lerchenfeld	0–1	FC Altstätten
16:00		Report

8 March 2025	Zug 94	4–2	FC Bazenheid
16:00		Report

8 March 2025	FC Frauenfeld	0–2	FC Lachen/Altendorf
16:00		Report

8 March 2025	SC Buochs	0–5	FC Gossau
16:00		Report

8 March 2025	FC Lommiswil	4–0	FC Muri
16:00		Report

8 March 2025	FC Locarno	3–3 (3–1 p)	FC Red Star ZH
17:00		Report

8 March 2025	FC Bosna Neuchâtel	1–0	US Collombey-Muraz
20:00		Report

9 March 2025	CS Romontois	0–1	Signal FC Bernex-Confignon
15:00		Report

=== Round 3 ===
The third and final round will begin on 18 June 2025.

18 June 2025	FC Bosporus	1–2	Zug 94
19:45		Report

18 June 2025	Signal FC Bernex-Confignon	2–0	FC Amical Saint-Prex
20:30		Report

21 June 2025	FC Vernier	2–0	FC Ueberstorf
15:00		Report

21 June 2025	FC Lommiswil	2–2 (a.e.t.) (8–7 p)	FC Sursee
16:00		Report

21 June 2025	FC Bosna Neuchâtel	1–0	US Terre Sainte
17:00		Report

21 June 2025	FC Ajoie-Monterri	2–1	FC Uster
17:00		Report

22 June 2025	FC Locarno	1–3	FC Altstätten
		Report

22 June 2025	FC Lachen/Altendorf	2–1	SC Binningen
16:00		Report

22 June 2025	FC Malcantone	2–3	FC Gossau
17:00		Report

== Regional qualification ==
Each regional association hosts a cup competition that determines the qualified teams from each region.
