= 2024–25 2. Liga Interregional =

Football league season in Switzerland

2. Liga Interregional
- Season: 2024–25
- Dates: 17 August 2024 – 14 June 2025
- Champions: Group 1: FC Amical Saint-Prex; Group 2: BSC Old Boys; Group 3: Zug 94; Group 4: FC Widnau
- Promoted: Group 1: FC Amical Saint-Prex, FC Martigny-Sports; Group 2: BSC Old Boys; Group 3: Zug 94, SC Buochs; Group 4: FC Widnau
- Relegated: Group 1: Châtel St-Denis, Stade Lausanne Ouchy III; Group 2: FC Lommiswil, Tavannes /Tramelan; Group 3: Muri-Gümligen, Goldau; Group 4: Frauenfeld, Bazenheid
- Matches played: 960
- Top goalscorer: Brendon Abazi (26 goals)
- All statistics correct as of complete.

The 2024–25 2. Liga Interregional is the 25th season of the 2. Liga Interregional since it was re-founded in 2000, the fifth tier of the Swiss football league system. The season began on 17 August 2024 and conclude on 14 June 2025.

== Team changes ==
=== Promoted from 2. Liga Interregional ===
- FC Ibach
- FC Lommiswil

== Rule changes ==
Mid-season, it was announced that only two teams would be relegated from each league, instead of four.

== League tables ==
=== Group 1 ===
Pos	Team	Pld	W	D	L	GF	GA	GD	Pts	Status
1	Amical Saint-Prex (C, P)	30	18	7	5	65	46	+19	61	Promotion to 2025–26 1. Liga Classic
2	Martigny-Sports (P)	30	18	5	7	62	32	+30	59	Promotion to 2025–26 1. Liga Classic
3	Collex-Bossy	30	13	13	4	51	33	+18	52	
4	US Terre Sainte	30	12	9	9	54	41	+13	45	
5	Farvagny/Ogoz	30	12	8	10	49	45	+4	44	
6	Olympique Genève	30	11	10	9	45	44	+1	43	
7	Pully Football	30	12	7	11	40	43	−3	43	
8	Vernier	30	11	9	10	50	44	+6	42	
9	Urania Genève Sport	30	11	7	12	42	41	+1	40	
10	Signal Bernex	30	9	10	11	38	42	−4	37	
11	Concordia Lausanne	30	10	7	13	56	53	+3	37	
12	Echichens	30	9	9	12	40	47	−7	36	
13	Romontois	30	10	5	15	58	71	−13	35	
14	Collombey-Muraz	30	9	8	13	36	40	−4	35	
15	Stade Lausanne Ouchy III (R)	30	9	5	16	43	58	−15	32	Relegation to 2. Liga
16	Châtel-St-Denis (R)	30	4	5	21	18	67	−49	17	Relegation to 2. Liga

Source: SFA
(C) Champions; (P) Promoted; (R) Relegated

=== Group 2 ===
Pos	Team	Pld	W	D	L	GF	GA	GD	Pts	
1	BSC Old Boys (C, P)	30	21	3	6	90	43	+47	66	Promotion to 2025–26 1. Liga Classic
2	Bosporus	30	18	5	7	75	43	+32	59	
3	Stade Lausanne Ouchy SA II	30	18	4	8	66	37	+29	58	
4	Düdingen	30	15	8	7	52	40	+12	53	
5	Bosna Neuchâtel	30	15	6	9	54	37	+17	51	
6	Dornach	30	15	5	10	59	44	+15	50	
7	Ajoie-Monterri	30	11	7	12	35	39	−4	40	
8	Pratteln	30	11	5	14	51	60	−9	38	
9	Ueberstorf	30	9	10	11	40	52	−12	37	
10	Allschwil	30	10	7	13	53	68	−15	37	
11	Muri-Gümligen	30	9	8	13	49	57	−8	35	
12	Binningen	30	8	8	14	40	57	−17	32	
13	Lyss	30	9	5	16	45	62	−17	32	
14	Lerchenfeld	30	8	7	15	39	63	−24	31	
15	Lommiswil (R)	30	7	10	13	33	51	−18	31	Relegation to 2. Liga
16	Tavannes/Tramelan (R)	30	6	2	22	36	64	−28	20	Relegation to 2. Liga

Source: SFA
(C) Champions; (P) Promoted; (R) Relegated

=== Group 3 ===
Pos	Team	Pld	W	D	L	GF	GA	GD	Pts	
1	Zug 94 (C, P)	30	22	6	2	84	30	+54	72	Promotion to 2025–26 1. Liga Classic
2	Buochs (P)	30	18	6	6	64	29	+35	60	Promotion to 2025–26 1. Liga Classic
3	Locarno	30	17	6	7	69	32	+37	57	
4	Sursee	30	16	5	9	64	50	+14	53	
5	Gambarogno-Contone	30	13	9	8	40	30	+10	48	
6	Lachen/Altendorf	30	12	8	10	53	54	−1	44	
7	Malcantone	30	12	8	10	56	49	+7	44	
8	Thalwil	30	12	6	12	40	48	−8	42	
9	Emmenbrücke	30	12	4	14	56	69	−13	40	
10	Emmen	30	9	6	15	51	69	−18	33	
11	Rothrist	30	8	8	14	40	63	−23	32	
12	Cham II	30	7	10	13	46	58	−12	31	
13	Ibach	30	8	7	15	50	62	−12	31	
14	Brunnen	30	7	9	14	42	49	−7	30	
15	Muri (R)	30	6	8	16	37	68	−31	26	Relegation to 2. Liga
16	Goldau (R)	30	4	8	18	37	69	−32	20	Relegation to 2. Liga

Source: SFA
(C) Champions; (P) Promoted; (R) Relegated

=== Group 4 ===
Pos	Team	Pld	W	D	L	GF	GA	GD	Pts	
1	Widnau (C, P)	30	19	4	7	65	38	+27	61	Promotion to 2025–26 1. Liga Classic
2	Balzers	30	19	2	9	63	37	+26	59	
3	Dardania St. Gallen	30	16	3	11	62	51	+11	51	
4	Gossau	30	15	5	10	70	46	+24	50	
5	Seefeld ZH	30	14	7	9	52	38	+14	49	
6	Schaffhausen II	30	12	6	12	65	57	+8	42	
7	Bülach	30	10	11	9	39	35	+4	41	
8	Altstätten	30	12	4	14	57	65	−8	40	
9	Uster	30	11	7	12	51	50	+1	40	
10	Red Star ZH	30	11	6	13	37	47	−10	39	
11	Dübendorf	30	12	3	15	43	64	−21	39	
12	Wil II	30	11	4	15	47	54	−7	37	
13	Chur 97	30	10	6	14	42	45	−3	36	
14	Arbon 05	30	10	6	14	50	62	−12	36	
15	Frauenfeld (R)	30	8	6	16	42	58	−16	30	Relegation to 2. Liga
16	Bazenheid (R)	30	7	6	17	38	75	−37	27	Relegation to 2. Liga

Source: SFA
(C) Champions; (P) Promoted; (R) Relegated
