= 2010–11 Swiss Cup =

Tournament details
- Country: Switzerland
- Teams: 64

Final positions
- Champions: FC Sion
- Runners-up: Neuchâtel Xamax

Tournament statistics
- Top goal scorer(s): Dragan Mrđa, Steven Zuber (6)

The 2010–11 Swiss Cup was the 86th season of Switzerland's annual football cup competition. It began on 18 September 2010 with the first games of Round 1 and ended on 29 May 2011 with the Final. The winners, FC Sion, claimed their 12th cup overall and will qualify for the play-off round of the UEFA Europa League.

== Participating clubs ==
All ten Super League teams and fifteen Challenge League clubs (FC Vaduz are from Liechtenstein and thus play in the 2010–11 Liechtenstein Cup) entered this year's competition, as well as 13 teams from 1. Liga and 26 teams from lower leagues. Teams from 1. Liga and below had to qualify through separate qualifying rounds within their leagues.

**2010–11 Super League**; 10 teams	**2010–11 Challenge League**; 15 teams	**2010–11 1. Liga**; 13 teams	**Amateur teams** 26 teams
FC Basel; AC Bellinzona; Grasshoppers Zürich; FC Luzern; Neuchâtel Xamax; FC St. Gallen; FC Sion; FC Thun; BSC Young Boys; FC Zürich	FC Aarau; FC Biel-Bienne; FC Chiasso; SR Delémont; SC Kriens; FC Lausanne-Sport; FC Locarno; AC Lugano; FC Schaffhausen; Servette FC; Stade Nyonnais; FC Wil; FC Winterthur; FC Wohlen; Yverdon-Sport FC	FC Baulmes; SC Brühl; SC Buochs; SC Cham; CS Chênois; Grand-Lancy FC; FC Grenchen; ES FC Malley; FC Meyrin; FC Le Mont; FC Mendrisio-Stabio; FC Schötz; FC Tuggen	**Fourth level**: FC Bavois; Black Stars Basel; FC Courtételle; FC Eschenbach; FC Freienbach; FC Gumefens/Sorens; FC Ibach; FC Langenthal; FC Liestal; Losone Sportiva; FC Montreux-Sports; FC Perly-Certoux; FC Seefeld Zürich; FC Spiez; AC Taverne; FC Wettswil-Bonstetten; **Fifth level**: FC Béroche-Gorgier; SC Binningen; FC Champvent; FC Collex-Bossy; US Collombey-Muraz; FC Entfelden; FC Flawil; FC Subingen; **Sixth level**: Racing Club Zürich; FC Uznach

Teams in bold are still active in the competition.

== Round 1 ==
Teams from Super League and Challenge League were seeded in this round. In a match, the home advantage was granted to the team from the lower league, if applicable.

The games were played on 18, 19 and 22 September 2010.

Team 1	Score	Team 2
18 September 2010
CS Chênois	1–3	FC Chiasso
Racing Club Zürich	1–7	Yverdon-Sport FC
Black Stars Basel	5–0	SC Brühl
FC Seefeld Zürich	1–3	AC Bellinzona
FC Wettswil-Bonstetten	0–2	Servette FC
SC Binningen	0–2	FC Baulmes
FC Spiez	0–7	BSC Young Boys
FC Uznach	1–3	Neuchâtel Xamax
FC Bavois	1–3	FC Aarau
SC Buochs	2–1 (a.e.t.)	SR Delémont
FC Collex-Bossy	5–1	FC Champvent
FC Flawil	1–5 (a.e.t.)	FC St. Gallen
ES FC Malley	3–2 (a.e.t.)	Grand-Lancy FC
FC Schötz	0–6	FC Zürich
US Collombey-Muraz	4–0	FC Courtételle
FC Eschenbach	1–3 (a.e.t.)	FC Wohlen
FC Liestal	2–5	FC Schaffhausen
Losone Sportiva	0–3	FC Biel-Bienne
FC Meyrin	1–3	FC Locarno
FC Montreux-Sports	1–2	FC Grenchen
FC Subingen	0–1	FC Gumefens/Sorens
AC Taverne	0–4	FC Sion
FC Le Mont	1–5	SC Kriens
19 September 2010
FC Ibach	0–2	AC Lugano
FC Béroche-Gorgier	0–9	Grasshoppers Zürich
SC Cham	0–4	FC Thun
FC Entfelden	0–3	FC Luzern
FC Freienbach	2–3 (a.e.t.)	FC Winterthur
FC Tuggen	2–1	FC Wil
FC Mendrisio-Stabio	0–5	FC Basel
FC Perly-Certoux	0–1	Stade Nyonnais
22 September 2010
FC Langenthal	2–5	FC Lausanne-Sport

== Round 2 ==
The winners of Round 1 played in this round. Teams from Super League were seeded, the home advantage was granted to the team from the lower league, if applicable.

The games were played on 15, 16 and 17 October 2010.

Team 1	Score	Team 2
15 October 2010
Yverdon-Sport FC	0–2	FC Basel
16 October 2010
Black Stars Basel	0–3	AC Lugano
SC Buochs	0–3	FC Thun
FC Tuggen	4–0	FC Grenchen
US Collombey-Muraz	2–5	BSC Young Boys
FC Collex-Bossy	0–5	FC Sion
FC Wohlen	5–1	FC Winterthur
FC Lausanne-Sport	0–2	AC Bellinzona
FC Chiasso	0–0 (a.e.t.) (p. 3–4)	Neuchâtel Xamax
ES FC Malley	0–3	FC Biel-Bienne
17 October 2010
FC Baulmes	2–5	Servette FC
FC Gumefens/Sorens	0–12	Grasshoppers Zürich
FC Locarno	0–3	FC Zürich
Stade Nyonnais	1–2	FC Luzern
FC Schaffhausen	2–6	FC St. Gallen
FC Aarau	2–3	SC Kriens

== Round 3 ==
The winners of Round 2 played in this round, the home advantage was granted to the team from the lower league, if applicable.

The games were played on 20–21 November 2010.

Team 1	Score	Team 2
20 November 2010
FC Tuggen	0–4	FC Zürich
Servette FC	1–1 (a.e.t.) (p. 3–4)	FC Basel
FC St. Gallen	0–1	FC Thun
21 November 2010
AC Lugano	2–3 (a.e.t.)	FC Sion
FC Biel-Bienne	2–2 (a.e.t.) (p. 5–3)	FC Luzern
SC Kriens	1–2	BSC Young Boys
Neuchâtel Xamax	1–0	AC Bellinzona
FC Wohlen	1–2	Grasshoppers Zürich

== Quarter-finals ==
The winners of Round 3 played in this round. The games were played on 2 and 3 March 2011.

2 March 2011
19:00

Grasshoppers Zürich	1 – 2	FC Sion
Abrashi 56'		Mrdja 19'; Obradović 87'

Letzigrund, Zürich
Attendance: 3,500
Referee: Alain Bieri

2 March 2011
19:45

FC Thun	1 – 1 (a.e.t.)	Neuchâtel Xamax
Klose 120'		Tréand 106'
Penalties
Matić (penalty missed); Schneider (penalty missed); Taljevic (penalty missed)	0 – 3	(penalty scored) Tréand; (penalty scored) Gohou; (penalty scored) Niasse

Stadion Lachen, Thun
Attendance: 2,385
Referee: Stephan Studer

2 March 2011
20:15

BSC Young Boys	3 – 4 (a.e.t.)	FC Zürich
Farnerud 54'; Bienvenu 56'; Mayuka 82'		Schönbächler 5'; Margairaz 41' 116'; Chermiti 49'

Stade de Suisse, Bern
Attendance: 12,195
Referee: Massimo Busacca

3 March 2011
19:30

FC Biel-Bienne	3 – 1	FC Basel
Egli 53'; Morello 80'; Etoundi 84'	(Report) (in German)	Kehrli 43' (o.g.)

Gurzelen Stadion, Biel/Bienne
Attendance: 6,500
Referee: Daniel Wermelinger

== Semi-finals ==
The winners of the quarter-finals played this round. The games were played on 25 and 28 April 2011.

25 April 2011
16:45 CET

FC Zürich	1 – 1 (a.e.t.)	Neuchâtel Xamax
Teixeira 26'		Tréand 66'
Penalties
Chermiti (penalty scored); Nikci (penalty scored); Rodríguez (penalty scored); Béda (penalty scored); Alphonse (penalty scored); Aegerter (penalty scored); Djurić (penalty missed)	6 – 7	(penalty scored) Tréand; (penalty scored) Nuzzolo; (penalty scored) Gohou; (penalty scored) Niasse; (penalty scored) Besle; (penalty scored) Page; (penalty scored) Binya

Letzigrund, Zürich
Attendance: 10,064
Referee: Daniel Wermelinger

28 April 2011
20:15 CET

FC Sion	2 – 1	FC Biel-Bienne
Sio 62'; Vanczák 85'		Kehrli 43'

Stade Tourbillon, Sion
Attendance: 14,600
Referee: Massimo Busacca

== Final ==
The final was played on 29 May 2011 between the two semi-final winners and took place at St. Jakob-Park in Basel.

29 May 2011
16:30 CET

Neuchâtel Xamax	0 – 2	FC Sion
		Sio 2'; Vanczák 6'

St. Jakob-Park, Basel
Attendance: 37,500
Referee: Jérôme Laperrière
