= 2025–26 1. Liga Classic =

Swiss 1. Liga Classic
- Season: 2025–26
- Dates: 8 August 2025 – 30 May 2026
- Champions: Servette U-21 (Group 1); Grasshopper Club U-21 (Group 2); YF Juventus (Group 3)
- Promoted: YF Juventus; Amical Saint-Prex
- Relegated: Martigny-Sports (Group 1); La Sarraz-Éclépens (Group 1); Besa Biel/Bienne (Group 2); Old Boys (Group 2); Höngg (Group 3); Schaffhausen (Group 3)
- Matches: 720
- Goals: 2,472 (3.43 per match)

The 2025–26 Swiss 1. Liga Classic was the 104th season of the Swiss 1. Liga Classic, the fourth tier of the Swiss football league system. The season began on 8 August 2025 and concluded on 30 May 2026, followed by the promotion play-offs on 6 and 13 June 2026.

== Team changes ==
=== Incoming ===
==== Promoted from 2024–25 2. Liga Interregional ====
- BSC Old Boys
- FC Amical Saint-Prex
- FC Martigny-Sports
- FC Widnau
- SC Buochs
- Zug 94

==== Relegated from 2024–25 Promotion League ====
- FC Baden
- SR Delémont

=== Outgoing ===
==== Promoted to 2025–26 Promotion League ====
- FC Kreuzlingen
- FC Lausanne-Sport U-21

==== Relegated to 2025–26 2. Liga Interregional ====
- FC Thun Berner Oberland U-21
- FC Linth 04
- FC Köniz
- FC Rotkreuz
- FC Uzwil
- Yverdon-Sport FC II

== League tables ==
The group winners, the group runners-up and the two best third-placed teams advanced to the promotion play-offs. The bottom two teams in each group were relegated.

=== Group 1 ===
Pos	Team	Pld	W	D	L	GF	GA	GD	Pts	Qualification
1	Servette U-21	30	19	4	7	82	33	+49	61	Advanced to the promotion play-offs
2	Amical Saint-Prex	30	18	3	9	62	44	+18	57	Advanced to the promotion play-offs
3	CS Chênois	30	14	11	5	56	41	+15	53	
4	Monthey	30	14	8	8	64	49	+15	50	
5	Prishtina Bern	30	15	5	10	57	46	+11	50	
6	Portalban/Gletterens	30	11	10	9	40	43	−3	43	
7	Lancy	30	12	5	13	50	53	−3	41	
8	Echallens Région	30	12	4	14	52	61	−9	40	
9	Naters Oberwallis	30	10	8	12	57	61	−4	38	
10	Stade-Payerne	30	10	8	12	41	48	−7	38	
11	Meyrin	30	11	4	15	46	52	−6	37	
12	Coffrane	30	9	8	13	46	59	−13	35	
13	Sion U-21	30	9	7	14	44	49	−5	34	
14	La Chaux-de-Fonds	30	9	4	17	43	61	−18	31	
15	Martigny-Sports	30	7	9	14	43	59	−16	30	Relegated to the 2026–27 2. Liga Interregional
16	La Sarraz-Éclépens	30	7	8	15	44	68	−24	29	Relegated to the 2026–27 2. Liga Interregional

Source: Erste Liga

=== Group 2 ===
Pos	Team	Pld	W	D	L	GF	GA	GD	Pts	Qualification
1	Grasshopper Club U-21	30	19	3	8	69	35	+34	60	Advanced to the promotion play-offs
2	Langenthal	30	17	7	6	63	37	+26	58	Advanced to the promotion play-offs
3	Courtételle	30	16	8	6	53	33	+20	56	Advanced to the promotion play-offs
4	Muttenz	30	14	9	7	64	46	+18	51	
5	Concordia Basel	30	13	6	11	62	50	+12	45	
6	Solothurn	30	13	6	11	54	47	+7	45	
7	Wohlen	30	12	7	11	44	42	+2	43	
8	Schötz	30	12	6	12	63	65	−2	42	
9	Black Stars Basel	30	12	5	13	54	67	−13	41	
10	Münsingen	30	10	8	12	44	47	−3	38	
11	Zug 94	30	9	10	11	41	51	−10	37	
12	Bassecourt	30	9	7	14	38	47	−9	34	
13	Buochs	30	10	4	16	37	52	−15	34	
14	Delémont	30	7	10	13	47	55	−8	31	
15	Besa Biel/Bienne	30	8	4	18	40	72	−32	28	Relegated to the 2026–27 2. Liga Interregional
16	Old Boys	30	7	4	19	47	74	−27	25	Relegated to the 2026–27 2. Liga Interregional

Source: Erste Liga

=== Group 3 ===
Pos	Team	Pld	W	D	L	GF	GA	GD	Pts	Qualification
1	YF Juventus	30	23	4	3	81	26	+55	73	Advanced to the promotion play-offs
2	Tuggen	30	19	4	7	74	52	+22	61	Advanced to the promotion play-offs
3	Taverne	30	18	6	6	54	31	+23	60	Advanced to the promotion play-offs
4	Wettswil-Bonstetten	30	18	5	7	74	36	+38	59	
5	Dietikon	30	12	8	10	54	47	+7	44	
6	Freienbach	30	12	7	11	53	53	0	43	
7	Baden	30	11	8	11	58	52	+6	41	
8	Mendrisio	30	11	7	12	42	44	−2	40	
9	Winterthur U-21	30	10	9	11	61	56	+5	39	
10	Collina d'Oro	30	10	9	11	46	44	+2	39	
11	Kosova	30	9	9	12	54	55	−1	36	
12	Eschen/Mauren	30	7	11	12	35	51	−16	32	
13	St. Gallen U-21	30	9	5	16	47	66	−19	32	
14	Widnau	30	7	6	17	34	63	−29	27	
15	Höngg	30	6	7	17	34	62	−28	25	Relegated to the 2026–27 2. Liga Interregional
16	Schaffhausen	30	3	5	22	24	87	−63	14	Relegated to the 2026–27 2. Liga Interregional

Source: Erste Liga

=== Ranking of third-place teams ===
Pos	Team	Pld	W	D	L	GF	GA	GD	Pts	Qualification
1	Taverne	30	18	6	6	54	31	+23	60	Advanced to the promotion play-offs
2	Courtételle	30	16	8	6	53	33	+20	56	Advanced to the promotion play-offs
3	Chênois	30	14	11	5	56	41	+15	53	

Source: Erste Liga

== Promotion play-offs ==
=== Semi-finals ===
6 June 2026
16:00 CEST

Tuggen	1–5	Langenthal
Morina 35'	Report	M'Vondo-Ze 45+4' (pen.), 59' (pen.); Rustemoski 77'; Vishi 84'; Xhemaili 90+1'

Linthstrasse (Platz 1), Tuggen
6 June 2026
16:00 CEST

YF Juventus	2–0 (a.e.t.)	Courtételle
Ramizi 38'; Avdijaj 118'	Report

Juchhof (R4), Zürich
6 June 2026
17:00 CEST

Servette U-21	1–0	Taverne
Boulac 45+4'	Report

Stade de Balexert (Terrain 1), Châtelaine
6 June 2026
18:00 CEST

Grasshopper Club U-21	1–1 (a.e.t.)	Amical Saint-Prex
Nsonga Fopossi Kouam 33'	Report	Pédat 38'
Penalties
Bengondo (penalty scored); Tesfom (penalty scored); Marcolli (penalty scored); Fiechter (penalty missed); Ismaili (penalty scored)	5–6	Le Neün (penalty scored); Latiere (penalty scored); Girardet (penalty scored); Joao Antonio (penalty scored); Carraturo (penalty scored)

GC/Campus (Platz 1), Niederhasli

=== Promotion finals ===
13 June 2026
18:00 CEST

Langenthal	1–4	YF Juventus
Rustemoski 45+2'	Report	Avdijaj 3', 39'; Uka 51', 82'

Rankmatte (Hauptplatz), Langenthal
13 June 2026
18:00 CEST

Servette U-21	2–4	Amical Saint-Prex
Ishuayed 78'; Ndiyo 82' (pen.)	Report	Joao Antonio 11'; Drieberg 43'; Carraturo 48'; Laouini 90+2'

Stade de Balexert (Terrain 2), Châtelaine
