= Melvin Mastil =

Algerian footballer (born 2000)

Personal information
- Full name: Melvin Feyçal Mastil
- Date of birth: 19 February 2000 (age 26)
- Place of birth: Thonon-les-Bains, France
- Height: 1.94 m (6 ft 4 in)
- Position: Goalkeeper

Team information
- Current team: Lausanne-Sport
- Number: 90

Youth career
- Echichens

Senior career*
Years	Team	Apps	(Gls)
2017–2019	Echichens	30	(0)
2019–2020	FC Azzurri 90 LS	13	(0)
2020–2021	Echallens	10	(0)
2021	→ Lausanne-Sport U21 (loan)	0	(0)
2021–2023	Lausanne-Sport U21	34	(0)
2021–	Lausanne-Sport	9	(0)
2023–2024	→ Biel-Bienne (loan)	23	(0)
2024–2026	→ Stade Nyonnais (loan)	52	(0)

International career^{‡}
2026–	Algeria	4	(0)
- * Club domestic league appearances and goals as of 28 September 2026 ‡ National team caps and goals as of 29 September 2026

Melvin Feyçal Mastil (born 19 February 2000) is a professional footballer who plays as a goalkeeper for the Swiss Super League club Lausanne-Sport. Born in France, he plays for the Algeria national team.

== Club career ==
A youth product of the Swiss club Echichens, Mastil transferred to Lausanne-Sport's reserve side FC Azzurri 90 LS on 16 August 2019.

The following season he moved to Echallens, before moving to Lausanne-Sport on loan on 18 February 2021. He permanently transferred to Lausanne-Sport on 27 July 2021 on a 3-year contract, and was named their third goalkeeper.

On 8 March 2023, he extended his contract with Lausanne-Sport until 2027. On 27 June 2023, he joined Biel-Bienne on a year-long loan in the Swiss Promotion League.

On 18 June 2024, he joined Stade Nyonnais on loan in the Swiss Challenge League. On 7 January 2026, he extended his contract with his parent club Lausanne-Sport until 2029.

== International career ==
Born in France, Mastil moved to Switzerland at the age of 6, and is of Algerian descent through a grandfather.

He was called up to the Algeria national team for a set of friendlies in March 2026. He debuted with Algeria in a 7–0 friendly win over Guatemala on 27 March 2026.

On 31 May 2026, Mastil was named in Vladimir Petković's 26-man Algeria squad for the 2026 FIFA World Cup.
