= Football in Switzerland =

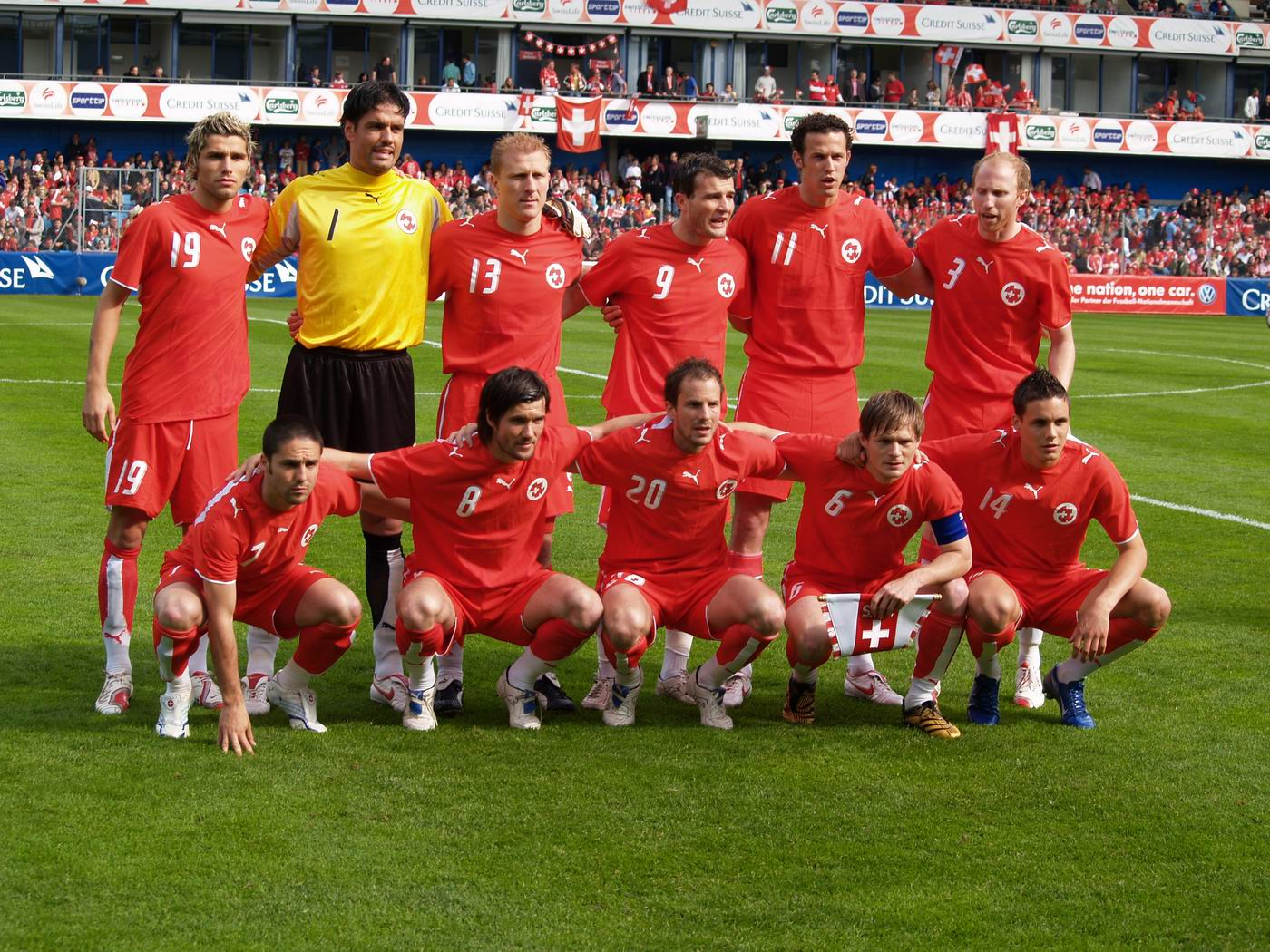
- Swiss national team in 2006
- Country: Switzerland
- Governing body: Swiss Football Association
- National team: men's national team
- First played: 1895; 131 years ago

National competitions
- FIFA World Cup; UEFA European Championship; UEFA Nations League

Club competitions
- Cups Swiss Cup Swiss Women's Cup League Swiss Super League Swiss Women's Super League Swiss Challenge League Swiss Promotion League

International competitions
- FIFA Club World Cup; FIFA Intercontinental Cup; UEFA Champions League; UEFA Women's Champions League; UEFA Europa League; UEFA Conference League; UEFA Super Cup

Football is the most popular sport in Switzerland. Approximately 65% of the people in Switzerland are interested in football.

The Swiss Football Association was formed in 1895 and was a founder member of the sport's international governing body FIFA in 1904. The Swiss cities of Zürich and Nyon are home to FIFA and the European governing body UEFA respectively. The country played host to the 1954 World Cup and 2008 European Championship.

Switzerland has an extensive league system, with the Swiss Super League as the country's premier men's competition. There are also several cup competitions, most notably the national Swiss Cup.

The Swiss national team participated in the 2006 FIFA World Cup in Germany and were narrowly beaten by Ukraine on penalties in the round of 16. Switzerland co-hosted the UEFA Euro 2008 tournament together with Austria. They were eliminated in the group stage, although they did record a win against Portugal. The best international result was in 1954 when Switzerland, as the host, reached the quarter-finals of the World Cup. They also reached the World Cup quarter-finals in 1934, 1938 and 2026.

== History ==
=== Early development (1850s-1900) ===
The first football matches, played in various forms, are documented in Switzerland from the 1850s-1860s on the shores of Lake Geneva. Some sources even testify to the existence of similar activities in Geneva in the first half of the 19th century. The main vectors of cultural transfer from Great Britain were boarding schools inspired by English public schools, with international teaching staff and students, British students and businessmen established in Switzerland, and Swiss people educated in schools across the English Channel.

The first football club in Switzerland was the Lausanne Football and Cricket Club, founded in 1860 by English students. It was also the first football club created outside of England. Several other clubs, with a majority of Anglo-Saxon players, emerged in the 1870s. From the 1880s, the sport entered physical education programs for primary and secondary school boys, though it faced decades of resistance from pedagogical circles. In cities, the number of new teams (often short-lived) increased. In 1895, 12 clubs founded the Swiss Football Association.

The first unofficial Swiss championship was won in 1898 by Grasshopper Club Zürich. The following year, the Anglo-American Club Zürich, composed mainly of Anglo-Saxon chemistry students from the Federal Polytechnic School, won the first official title. At the turn of the century, the first signs of supporter culture appeared, such as team-colored lanterns and victory celebrations. Only a few hundred people attended championship matches and a few thousand watched final phase encounters.

The first matches of a Swiss selection (composed mainly of foreign players) against teams from neighboring countries were organized from 1897, with the national team playing its first official international match in 1905. Some clubs also participated in international encounters and tournaments abroad, such as FC Winterthur (1909) and FC Zürich (1911) at the Sir Thomas Lipton Trophy in Turin.

Switzerland was a crossroads for football's spread: Swiss club founders and foreign pioneers who had discovered the sport in Swiss schools contributed to its propagation in Italy, France, Germany, Spain, Russia, southeastern Europe, North Africa, and Brazil. Hans Gamper from Winterthur founded FC Barcelona (1899), and Walther Bensemann, who had attended school in Montreux, was behind several German clubs and the football magazine Kicker (1920).

In 1904, Switzerland co-founded FIFA with six other continental European countries. FIFA's headquarters has been in Zurich since 1932, and it has been led by Swiss presidents since 1998 (Sepp Blatter, 1998-2015; Gianni Infantino from 2016). Switzerland also participated in creating UEFA in 1954 in Basel. UEFA's headquarters was in Bern from 1959 before moving to Nyon in 1995. Swiss Gustav Wiederkehr served as UEFA president from 1962 to 1972.

=== Expansion and growth (1900-1945) ===
A geographical and social expansion of men's football began early in Switzerland. After the turn of the century, teams also emerged in rural regions. While the ASF had 26 clubs in 1902, it already had 115 in 1914, with about 15,000 members. Until 1918, almost all regions of the country were represented in the first division championship, except for southern and southeastern Switzerland (FC Chiasso was part of the Italian first category from 1914-1915).

Originally practiced mainly by merchants and university graduates, football then spread among men of other social classes and, from around 1900, also within the working class. Several matches were played during the 1914 Swiss National Exhibition. During World War I, national and international competitions continued, and football was integrated into army activities.

In the interwar period, male youth was gripped by "football fever" repeatedly criticized by pedagogical circles. Although handball was promoted as an alternative in schools, unorganized football, played by boys in streets, squares, and meadows since the 1880s, gained popularity. The sport's notoriety experienced new growth when Switzerland reached the final of the Olympic tournament in 1924. Organized football also developed: in 1945, the ASFA had 80,000 active players in its ranks.

Competitive activities were also offered by the Swiss Workers' Gymnastics and Sports Federation (Satus), which launched its own championship in 1921, by the Swiss Catholic Gymnastics and Sports Federation, and by the ephemeral communist sports association Rotsport-Verband. Corporate football, after regional beginnings in the interwar period, designated a national champion from 1943 and experienced its peak in the immediate post-war period. Jewish football, represented by football sections of various Jewish gymnastics societies, by FC Hakoah Zürich (founded in 1922), and from 1950 by Swiss selections participating in international tournaments of the Maccabi movement, was integrated into the ASFA.

Simultaneously, football became an element of new mass culture. Its media coverage increased with the emergence of press photography, radio, the Swiss Newsreel, and specialized sports press. Players became advertising vehicles. Twelve stadiums with a capacity of more than 10,000 people each were built between 1922 and 1934. In 1925, the ASFA launched a second national competition, the Swiss Cup (later Swiss Cup). A national league was created in 1931 with sometimes professional players. However, the public was not responsive, and professionalism was criticized by various political and sporting circles. In 1941, due notably to financial problems encountered by clubs, the ASFA completely banned the use of professional footballers.

Switzerland's victory against "Greater Germany" during the 1938 FIFA World Cup, which triggered general euphoria in the country, made football, as a male sport, an element of spiritual defense. Gala matches between the Swiss national team and selections from neighboring countries, as well as an international junior tournament, were organized during the 1939 Swiss National Exhibition. During World War II, activities continued at national and, until 1943, international levels. Matches attracting large audiences opposed selections from military units. Four friendly matches played against Germany in 1941 and 1942, attended by political, military, and diplomatic personalities from both countries, caused a sensation.

=== Post-war developments (1945-1990) ===
The return to amateurism after 1941, followed by a timid transition to semi-professionalism in the late 1950s, led to the decline of high-level Swiss football on the international scene. The national team nevertheless still achieved good performances during the World Cups in Brazil (1950) and at home (1954). Despite the symbiosis between football and television, which stimulated the sport's commercialization, and the transition to full professionalism in the late 1970s, Switzerland never managed to qualify in the 1970s and 1980s for a final phase of the World Cup or UEFA European Championship.

Even in European competitions reserved for clubs, contested from 1955, Swiss teams were often eliminated very quickly. The only exceptions were the semi-finals reached by BSC Young Boys (1959) and FC Zürich (1964 and 1977) in the European Cup and by Grasshopper Club Zürich (1978) in the UEFA Cup. During these years, attendance at championship matches remained modest and stadium infrastructure became obsolete.

Supporter culture nevertheless continued to develop. British elements, such as chants, appeared around Swiss stadiums, and supporters of various teams organized into fan clubs and support groups. In 1951, disturbances were recorded during the Swiss Cup final. From the late 1960s, the use of pyrotechnic devices became increasingly frequent, as did pitch invasions by the public, which led to the installation of fences around the pitches in the 1970s. The international wave of football hooliganism, sometimes influenced by the far-right, reached Switzerland during the following decade.

The post-war social transformation was also manifested in football through the creation of numerous clubs reflecting the strong immigration that characterized the period of high economic growth. Their founding dates allow tracing the chronology and geographical origin of the different waves of immigration that succeeded each other in Switzerland. This process continued into the 21st century, so that in urban regions nearly a third of clubs were founded by immigrants.

=== Modern era developments (1990-present) ===
In line with international trends, the commercialization of Swiss men's football experienced a new surge from the 1990s. At the same time, the national team's performances improved. In 1994, Switzerland qualified for the first time since 1966 for a World Cup final phase; from then on, it regularly participated in World Cups and European Championships. Players from immigrant backgrounds were often the architects of these successes and became emblematic of successful integration policy.

Following past examples, some high-level clubs were transformed into joint-stock companies. At the beginning of the 21st century, annual budgets sometimes exceeded 60 million Swiss francs. Simultaneously, economic problems multiplied due to excessive transfer amounts, overly high player salaries, and financial speculation. They culminated with the spectacular bankruptcies of traditional clubs like Servette FC in 2005 and Neuchâtel Xamax in 2012.

Stadium infrastructure was modernized in view of the UEFA Euro 2008 held in Switzerland and Austria. The international culture of ultras supporters, who support their team with elaborate choreographies while criticizing commercialization and the loss of football club identity, also manifested itself on Swiss pitches from the 1990s. At the same time, problems related to hooliganism remained current and reached their peak with violent disturbances in Basel in 2006 and Zurich in 2011, as well as with the scandal caused by antisemitic ultras from FC Luzern in St. Gallen in 2015.

In 2022, the ASF had 325,000 members (including 12% women), making it the largest sports federation in Switzerland. Football's popularity is also attested by the fact that various pressure groups organized outside official structures and were sometimes behind their own international competitions: these include LGBT tournaments played during the EuroGames in Zurich (2000) and Bern (2023), or the Europeada, a football championship for linguistic minorities first organized in 2008 in Grisons.

=== Women's football ===
In Switzerland, the beginnings of women's football are located in Geneva, like its male counterpart, where young women from the upper class and passionate about sports founded the club Les Sportives in 1923. In 1927, a girls' team existed within FC Young Fellows Zürich. Women's teams also participated in village tournaments in Adliswil between 1939 and 1950. Subsequently, until the 1960s, no trace of women's football activities is attested in written sources.

While the ASF did not prohibit women's football, unlike the English (1921-1971) or German (1955-1970) national federations, it hindered its practice under the pretext that this very physical team sport was unfeminine, unaesthetic, and medically harmful for girls and women. While sports practiced by the bourgeoisie and aristocracy, such as tennis, golf, and equestrianism, were already accessible to women at the end of the 19th century, women's history in football is marked by harassment, malevolence, and marginalization.

At the beginning of the 1960s, popularized by leisure tournaments and thanks to emerging social changes, football transformed into a mass sport. In 1963, Monika and Silvia Stahel as well as Theres Rüsch founded FC Goitschel in Murgenthal, the first women's football club in Switzerland. Additionally, the ASF trained the two sisters and their teammates to referee official junior matches. In 1965, Valaisanne Madeleine Boll was the first girl in the world to obtain a football license from a national federation, which also generated great media attention internationally. However, the ASF withdrew it shortly after, arguing it was an error; de facto, this amounted to prohibiting women from playing football.

At the end of the 1960s, decisive steps were taken in terms of institutionalization. In 1968, DFC Zürich (Damenfussball-Club, literally "ladies' football club") was the first women's football club to emerge as an association under Article 60 of the Swiss Civil Code. In 1969, clubs from French-speaking Switzerland grouped together within the Romance Association of Women's Football (ARFF). In 1970, the Swiss Women's Football League (LSFF) was founded in Bern as a national umbrella organization.

The LSFF had paved the way for regular matches. The first Swiss championship in 1970-1971 with 18 teams was won by DFC Aarau. During the 1975-1976 season, female footballers played for the first time for the Swiss Cup, won by FC Sion. Also in 1970, a selection of Swiss players participated in the first unofficial women's world championship in Salerno. In 1972, the Swiss national team made its official debut in Basel against France.

The development of women's football coincided with the introduction of women's suffrage in 1971 and with advances in gender equality, such as the constitutional article adopted in 1970 concerning the promotion of gymnastics and sports, which made sports practice mandatory at school for both boys and girls. However, female footballers were hardly perceived as representatives of the women's movement. Until the 1990s, the media generally held denigrating and sexist remarks about them, even hostile toward homosexuality, whether through words or images.

The 1990s were characterized by worldwide success of women's football, established for the first time as an Olympic sport at the Atlanta Games in 1996. In Switzerland, the LSFF and ASF decided in 1993 to dissolve the women's football league and completely integrate the discipline into the ASF's regional associations; the designation "ladies' football club" (DFC) for women's teams was suppressed. Girls were authorized from 1995 to play with boys in mixed teams in all ASF clubs.

Regular qualifications of the Swiss national team for final phases of world or European championships initiated a consolidation phase from 2015 in terms of sport and equality policy. This was accompanied by increased media attention and greater commercialization. Women sat for the first time in the ASF's central bodies, in 2020 in management (Tatjana Haenni) and in 2024 in the central committee. Between 2022 and 2024, certain bonuses for male and female national teams as well as remuneration for players' advertising revenue were harmonized.

Despite these successes, women's football long remained trapped in an economic vicious circle: low attendance at top league matches (only a few hundred supporters in stadiums), broadcast on Swiss television since 2020, led to decreased revenue from sponsors and ticketing, as well as limited merchandising possibilities, which in turn harmed financial room for maneuver and public attention. Most professional players still earn little and must have paid employment outside football or be in training.

=== Football for people with disabilities ===
Football for people with disabilities developed outside the media radar. As in disability sport in general, people with hearing impairments showed the way: the Taubstummen-Fussballklub Zürich was founded as early as 1916. Within the Swiss Deaf Sports Federation created in 1930 (Swiss Deaf Sport from 2020), football was practiced from the beginning, even internationally, notably with participation in the 1931 International Silent Games.

Since the 1950s, sport for other forms of disability also organized. The Swiss Association for Invalid Sport (ASSI, Swiss Disabled Sports Federation in 1977, PluSport from 2000) and the Federation of Sports Groups of the Swiss Invalid Association (ASI, Procap Sport from 2002) emerged in 1960, the year of the first Paralympic Games. The Special Olympics Switzerland foundation for people with intellectual disabilities and multiple disabilities was created in 1995.

With more than 800 players in 2023, football represents the main discipline within the association, and Swiss teams have participated several times in the Special Olympics. However, no Swiss participation has yet been recorded in the various categories of Paralympic men's football, present at the Games since 1984. Switzerland is nevertheless a member of international federations for wheelchair football (variants of this discipline have existed since the 1970s) and football for people with cerebral palsy.

== Swiss football competitions ==
=== Men's football ===
The Swiss football pyramid is divided into nine levels. The top two levels are operated by the Swiss Football League. Between the sixth and ninth levels, the leagues are operated by regional football associations. All other levels are operated by the Swiss Football Association.

- Super League: is the first division of Swiss football. It was founded in 1897, the team consists to 12 teams since 2023–24 and is the longest continuously running top-flight national league. The five teams with the most titles are Grasshopper Club Zürich, FC Basel, Servette FC from Geneva, FC Zürich and BSC Young Boys from Bern.
- Challenge League: is the second division in the Swiss league system. It consists of 10 clubs, of which the champion is promoted directly to the Super League. As of 2019, the second plays the promotion playoffs with ninth place in the Super League.
- Promotion League: is the third division in the Swiss league system. There are 18 teams. The champion is promoted directly to Challenge League. The two last teams are relegated. It is the highest division where reserve/U21 teams are eligible to play.
- 1st League Classic: is the fourth division in the Swiss league system. 48 teams are divided into three groups of 16.
- 2nd League Interregional: is the fifth division in the league system of Switzerland. 70 teams are divided into five groups of 14.
- 2. Liga: is the sixth division in the Swiss league system, where 17 groups contain 215 teams.
- 3. Liga
- 4. Liga
- 5. Liga

==== Non-league competitions ====
- Swiss Cup: is the national cup of Swiss football, organized by the Swiss Football Association and whose champion qualifies for the UEFA Europa Conference League.
- Uhrencup
- Coppa delle Alpi

=== Women's football ===
The Swiss women's football championship is divided into 6 levels.

- Women's Super League, the top level women's league: Founded in 1970, it was originally known as Nationalliga A, until 2020. Since its renaming, the format was also adapted to include a regular season and a play-off stage.
- Nationalliga B
- First League, divided into three groups
- Second League, six interregional groups of 10-12 teams
- Third and Fourth Leagues are divided by regions
- Swiss Women's Cup, first carried out in 1975

== Swiss clubs in European competitions ==
Clubs of the Swiss Super League may qualify for UEFA competitions. Switzerland is currently ranked 14th in the UEFA ranking. As such, five teams are eligible to compete in European competitions, two each in the UEFA Champions League qualifier and the UEFA Europa Conference League qualifier, and the winner of the Swiss Cup enters qualification for the UEFA Europa League.

No Swiss team has ever won any major European trophy.

Grasshopper Club Zürich is the only Swiss team to have won the UEFA Intertoto Cup, doing so twice in 2006 and 2008, while Basel were a runner-up in 2001, before the competition was discontinued in 2009. Prior to UEFA's involvement in the Intertoto Cup in 1995, multiple Swiss teams had emerged victorious.

=== Best placement by tournament ===
Competition	Best placement	Club	Season
Champions League/European Cup	Semi-finals	Zürich	1963–64
Champions League/European Cup	Semi-finals	Zürich	1976–77
Europa League/UEFA Cup	Semi-finals	Basel	2012–13
Europa League/UEFA Cup	Semi-finals	Grasshopper	1977–78
Conference League	Semi-finals	Basel	2022–23
Cup Winners' Cup	Quarter-finals	Grasshopper	1989–90
Cup Winners' Cup	Quarter-finals	Zürich	1973–74
Cup Winners' Cup	Quarter-finals	Luzern	1960–61

=== Historical UEFA Coefficient and Ranking ===
Year	1956	1957	1958	1959	1960	1961	1962	1963	1964	1965	1966	1967	1968	1969	1970	1971	1972	1973	1974	1975	1976	1977	1978	1979	1980	1981	1982	1983	1984	1985	1986	1987	1988	1989	1990	1991	1992	1993	1994	1995	1996	1997	1998	1999	2000	2001	2002	2003	2004	2005	2006	2007	2008	2009	2010	2011	2012	2013	2014	2015	2016	2017	2018	2019	2020	2021	2022	2023
UEFA coefficient	0	4	2.67	10	0.33	1.75	2.25	1.67	2.5	3	1.75	2.25	2.75	0.8	1.5	2.25	1.5	2.25	4.25	2	1.5	5	4.4	4.75	2.75	4.75	5.5	4	1.25	3	4	4	2.75	2.25	3.75	2.25	3.75	3.5	2.25	3.75	5	7	4.25	5.75	4.125	4.375	6.125	5.875	1.875	2.625	9.375	4.1	6.25	2.9	5.75	5.9	6	8.375	7.2	6.9	5.3	4.3	6.5	3.9	6.4	5.125	7.75	8.5
5 year total					17	18.75	17	16	8.5	11.17	11.17	11.17	12.25	10.55	9.05	9.55	8.8	8.3	11.75	12.25	11.5	15	17.15	17.65	18.4	21.65	22.15	21.75	18.25	18.5	17.75	16.25	15	16	16.75	15	14.75	15.5	15.5	15.5	18.25	21.5	22.25	25.75	26.125	25.5	24.625	26.25	22.375	20.875	25.875	23.85	24.225	25.25	28.375	24.9	26.8	28.925	33.225	34.375	33.775	32.075	30.2	26.9	26.4	26.225	29.675	31.675
Year ranking	15	9	9	3	24	19	14	21	19	16	19	20	16	29	22	17	24	22	13	20	22	8	10	6	20	14	10	14	23	19	13	15	17	23	11	18	15	17	27	22	13	8	24	9	17	18	11	13	27	26	8	19	11	20	16	12	15	11	11	10	17	20	12	26	11	17	13	13
5 year ranking					10	12	14	15	20	22	20	22	20	21	22	22	23	25	21	21	21	19	17	16	15	12	11	14	15	16	16	20	19	18	15	17	19	17	14	16	15	17	16	16	14	17	16	13	13	19	16	17	16	15	13	16	14	13	13	11	12	12	12	17	17	19	14	13

Updated to match(es) played on 30 June 2023. Source:

== National team ==
The Swiss national team, in its various categories, is controlled by the Swiss Football Association.

The Swiss team played their first official match on 12 February 1905 in Paris against France, with the French winning 1-0. Switzerland has managed to qualify for 11 FIFA World Cups and five European Championships, including Euro 2008, where they were co-hosts together with Austria.

=== Women's national football team ===
The women's team debuted on 4 May 1972 against France in a match that ended 2-2 in Basel, and has qualified for the 2015 FIFA Women's World Cup and UEFA Women's Euro 2017.

== Swiss football stadiums ==
Stadiums with a capacity of 20,000 or higher are included.

#	Stadium	Capacity	City	Home team(s)	Image
1	St. Jakob-Park	38,512	Basel	FC Basel	
2	Stade de Suisse	31,783	Bern	BSC Young Boys	
3	Stade de Genève	30,084	Lancy	Servette FC	
4	Letzigrund	26,104	Zürich	FC Zürich, Grasshopper Club Zürich	

== Attendances ==
The average attendance per top-flight football league season and the club with the highest average attendance:

Season	League average	Best club	Best club average
2024-25	12,315	Young Boys	28,482
2023-24	11,240	Young Boys	28,878
2022-23	13,172	Young Boys	29,097
2021-22	—	—	—
2020-21	—	—	—
2019-20	11,166	Young Boys	26,708
2018-19	11,273	Young Boys	25,751
2017-18	11,181	Basel	25,857
2016-17	9,944	Basel	26,497
2015-16	10,751	Basel	28,597
2014-15	10,867	Basel	28,878
2013-14	10,772	Basel	27,841
2012-13	12,022	Basel	29,036
2011-12	12,253	Basel	29,775
2010-11	11,365	Basel	29,044
2009-10	11,059	Basel	23,656
2008-09	8,967	Basel	21,044
2007-08	10,917	Basel	23,539
2006-07	9,673	Basel	20,144
2005-06	7,994	Basel	21,806
2004-05	8,305	Basel	24,928
2003-04	8,992	Basel	27,886
2002-03	7,779	Basel	26,872
2001-02	7,291	Basel	25,820
2000-01	6,204	Basel	15,152
1999-00	5,651	St. Gallen	10,006
1998-99	5,832	Basel	8,141
1997-98	6,594	Basel	10,128
1996-97	7,095	Basel	10,811
1995-96	6,849	Basel	12,028
1994-95	6,738	Basel	14,767
1993-94	5,392	Sion	8,639
1992-93	5,222	Xamax	8,506
1991-92	6,706	Sion	10,586
1990-91	6,444	Sion	9,678
1989-90	7,092	Luzern	11,444
1988-89	6,711	Luzern	12,439
1987-88	7,168	Neuchâtel	12,456
1986-87	5,296	Neuchâtel	10,840
1985-86	5,239	Young Boys	10,500
1984-85	4,378	St. Gallen	7,067
1983-84	5,073	St. Gallen	7,660
1982-83	5,113	Luzern	8,420
1981-82	5,195	Luzern	8,320
1980-81	5,153	Young Boys	10,838
1979-80	5,965	Luzern	10,842
1978-79	5,647	Zürich	9,794
1977-78	5,464	Basel	9,375
1976-77	5,917	Basel	11,219
1975-76	5,314	Basel	9,615
1974-75	5,329	Zürich	8,677
1973-74	6,075	Zürich	11,015
1972-73	6,059	Basel	13,154
1971-72	6,998	Basel	18,769
1970-71	7,233	Basel	17,385
1969-70	7,529	Basel	15,808
1968-69	7,656	Basel	15,477
1967-68	8,025	Basel	14,754
1966-67	6,535	Basel	11,715
1965-66	5,933	Zürich	11,746
1964-65	5,191	Young Boys	9,115
1963-64	5,742	Young Boys	9,885
1962-63	5,935	Young Boys	11,000
1961-62	5,837	Young Boys	11,192
1960-61	6,190	Young Boys	12,577
1959-60	6,068	Young Boys	12,808
1958-59	5,526	Young Boys	10,038
1957-58	5,511	Young Boys	10,192
1956-57	5,290	Young Boys	11,000
1955-56	5,208	Young Boys	9,808
1954-55	4,933	GCZ	8,023
1953-54	5,571	Young Boys	9,323
1952-53	5,024	Servette	9,231
1951-52	5,604	GCZ	11,769
1950-51	4,519	Young Fellows	7,354
1949-50	4,509	Servette	7,592
1948-49	5,090	GCZ	9,538
1947-48	5,143	Young Fellows	7,667
1946-47	4,385	Servette	6,946
1945-46	3,758	Servette	6,769
1944-45	3,672	GCZ	6,500
1943-44	3,455	Lausanne	5,346
1942-43	3,026	GCZ	4,692
1941-42	2,924	GCZ	5,292
1940-41	2,312	GCZ	4,164
1939-40	1,784	GCZ	3,109
1938-39	3,324	GCZ	4,600
1937-38	3,161	GCZ	4,109
1936-37	3,113	GCZ	4,417
1935-36	2,906	Lausanne	4,231
1934-35	3,090	Basel	4,423
1933-34	3,024	GCZ	4,667

== Most successful clubs overall ==
As of 24 May 2026

Club	Domestic Titles					International Titles			Overall titles
Club	Swiss Super League	Swiss Cup	Swiss League Cup	Swiss Super Cup	Total	Cup of the Alps	Intertoto Cup	Total	Overall titles
Grasshopper	27	19	2	1	49	-	-	-	49
Basel	21	14	1	-	36	3	-	3	39
Servette	17	8	3	-	28	4	-	4	32
Young Boys	17	8	1	1	27	1	-	1	28
Zürich	13	10	1	-	24	-	1	1	25
Lausanne-Sport	7	9	-	-	16	-	-	-	16
Sion	2	13	-	-	15	-	-	-	15
La Chaux-de-Fonds	3	6	-	-	9	-	-	-	9
Lugano	3	4	-	-	7	-	-	-	7
Neuchâtel Xamax	3	-	-	3	6	-	-	-	6
Aarau	3	1	1	-	5	-	-	-	5
St. Gallen	2	2	1	-	5	-	-	-	5
Luzern	1	3	-	-	4	-	-	-	4
Winterthur	3	-	-	-	3	-	-	-	3
Anglo-American Club Zürich	1	-	-	-	1	-	-	-	1
Bellinzona	1	-	-	-	1	-	-	-	1
Biel-Bienne	1	-	-	-	1	-	-	-	1
Brühl	1	-	-	-	1	-	-	-	1
Étoile-Sporting	1	-	-	-	1	-	-	-	1
Thun	1	-	-	-	1	-	-	-	1
Grenchen	-	1	-	-	1	-	-	-	1
Urania Genève Sport	-	1	-	-	1	-	-	-	1
Wil	-	1	-	-	1	-	-	-	1
Young Fellows Juventus	-	1	-	-	1	-	-	-	1

== See also ==
- List of Swiss football champions
- List of football clubs in Switzerland
- List of football stadiums in Switzerland
- 1954 FIFA World Cup (hosted by Switzerland)
- 2008 UEFA European Football Championship (co-hosted by Switzerland)

== Bibliography ==
- Jérôme Berthoud, Grégory Quin et Philippe Vonnard, Le football suisse : Des pionniers aux professionnels, Lausanne, Presses polytechniques et universitaires romandes, coll. « Le savoir suisse », 2016 Wayback Machine
- Ruoff, Paul: Le livre d'or du football suisse, 1953.
- Ducret, Jacques: Le livre d'or du football suisse, 1994.
- Lanfranchi, Pierre: «Football et modernité. La Suisse et la pénétration du football sur le continent», in: Traverse, 5/3, 1998, pp. 76-88.
- Schuler, Martin: «La dynamique géographique du sport d'élite suisse: le cas du football», in: Jaccoud, Christophe; Tissot, Laurent; Pedrazzini, Yves (éd.): Sports en Suisse. Traditions, transitions et transformations, 2000, pp. 125-149.
- Kocher, Benno: «L'institutionnalisation du football féminin en Suisse: du conflit à l'intégration», in: Jaccoud, Christophe; Busset, Thomas (éd.): Sports en formes. Acteurs, contextes et dynamiques d'institutionnalisation, 2001, pp. 137-152.
- Brändle, Fabian; Koller, Christian: Goal! Kultur- und Sozialgeschichte des modernen Fussballs, 2002, pp. 207-232. Meier, Marianne: «Zarte Füsschen am harten Leder...». Frauenfussball in der Schweiz 1970-1999, 2004.
- Jung, Beat (éd.): Die Nati. Die Geschichte der Schweizer Fussball-Nationalmannschaft, 2006. Bosshard, Werner; Jung, Beat: Die Zuschauer der Schweizer Fussball-Nationalmannschaft, 2008.
- Koller, Christian (éd.): Sternstunden des Schweizer Fussballs, 2008.
- David, Thomas; Bancel, Nicolas; Ohl, Fabien (éd.): Le football en Suisse. Enjeux sociaux et symbolique d'un spectacle universel, 2009.
- Guggisberg, Philippe (éd.): 75 ans Swiss Football League – Ligue nationale ASF, 2009. Poli, Raffaele; Berthoud, Jérôme et al.: Football et intégration. Les clubs de migrants albanais et portugais en Suisse, 2012.
- Vonnard, Philippe; Quin, Grégory: «Eléments pour une histoire de la mise en place du professionnalisme dans le football suisse durant l'entre-deux-guerres: processus, résistances et ambiguïtés», in: Revue suisse d'histoire, 62/1, 2012, pp. 70-85. Brändle, Fabian; Koller, Christian: 4 zu 2. Die goldene Zeit des Schweizer Fussballs 1918-1939, 2014.
- Zeyringer, Klaus: «Geschlechterdifferenzen», in: Zeyringer, Klaus: Fussball, eine Kulturgeschichte, 2014, pp. 360-371. Berthoud, Jérôme; Quin, Grégory; Vonnard, Philippe: Le football suisse. Des pionniers aux professionnels, 2016.
- Busset, Thomas; Fincoeur, Bertrand; Besson, Roger (éd.): En marge des grands: le football en Belgique et en Suisse, 2018. FCZ-Revue: Eine eigene Liga! 50 Jahre Frauenfussball in der Schweiz, 2021.
- Koller, Christian: «The establishment of football at Swiss schools: from the mid-nineteenth century to the inter-war period», in: Soccer and Society, 2025, pp. 591-605.
- Meier, Marianne; Hofmann, Monika: Droit au but. L'histoire du football féminin suisse, 2025. Prudent, Dominique: Histoire du football féminin en Suisse, 2025.
