= Yvan Moret =

Swiss footballer (born 1955)

Personal information
- Date of birth: 12 December 1955 (age 70)
- Position: Defender

Senior career*
Years	Team	Apps	(Gls)
1974–1980	FC Martigny-Sports		
1980–1982	Neuchâtel Xamax		
1982–1983	FC Monthey		
1987?–1989	FC Martigny-Sports		
- * Club domestic league appearances and goals

Yvan Moret (born 12 December 1955) is a retired Swiss football defender.
