= FC Hakoah =

Swiss football club

- Full name: Fußball Club Hakoah
- Founded: 1 July 1921
- Ground: Sportamt Stadt Zürich
- Capacity: 100
- Chairman: Lionel Blumberg
- League: 5. Liga (Gruppe 5)
- 2005/06: 5. Liga (Gruppe 6), 6th
Home colours	Away colours

FC Hakoah, is an association football club based in Zürich, Switzerland. It is a Jewish club.

== See also ==
- List of football clubs in Switzerland
