= Gspon =

Village in Staldenried in the canton of Valais, Switzerland

Coordinates: 46°13′29″N 7°54′09″E

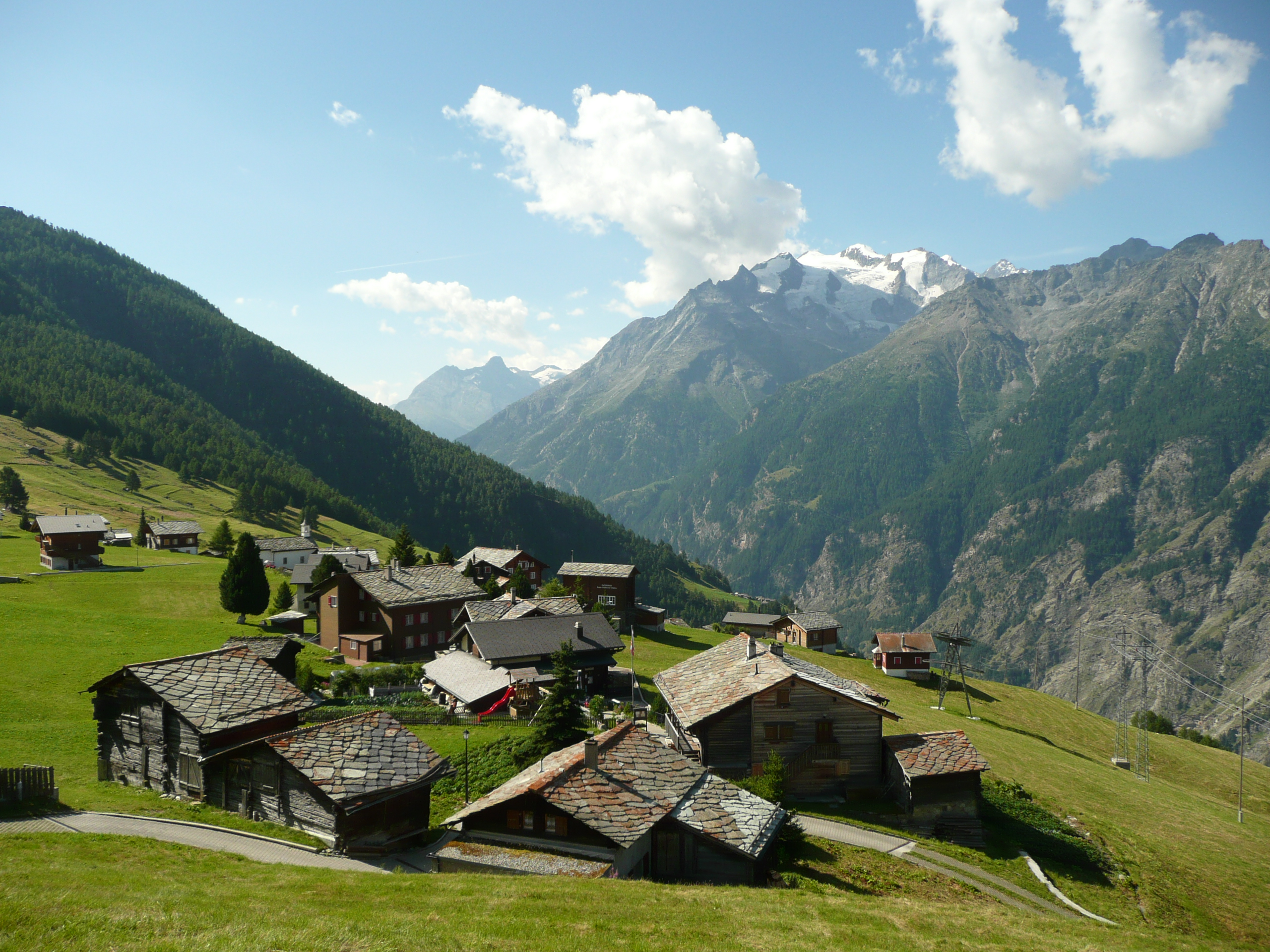
View of Gspon with the Balfrin in background

Gspon is a village in the Swiss Alps, located in the canton of Valais. The village is situated in the eastern part of the canton in the Saastal valley above Staldenried at a height of 1,899 metres (6,230 ft). It belongs to the latter municipality. Gspon has a population of 585.

Accessible by cable car from Stalden via Staldenried, Gspon is a car-free village and a popular year-round tourist destination. In winter Gspon's small ski area is kept open.

== Attractions ==
The village, characterised by its large green valleys and hills, is located in the Alps and is popular with hikers. Cable cars link to other locations above and under Gspon from the village itself.

Gspon's football pitch, Ottmar Hitzfeld Stadium, is the highest in Europe at almost 2 kilometres (1.2 mi) above sea level.

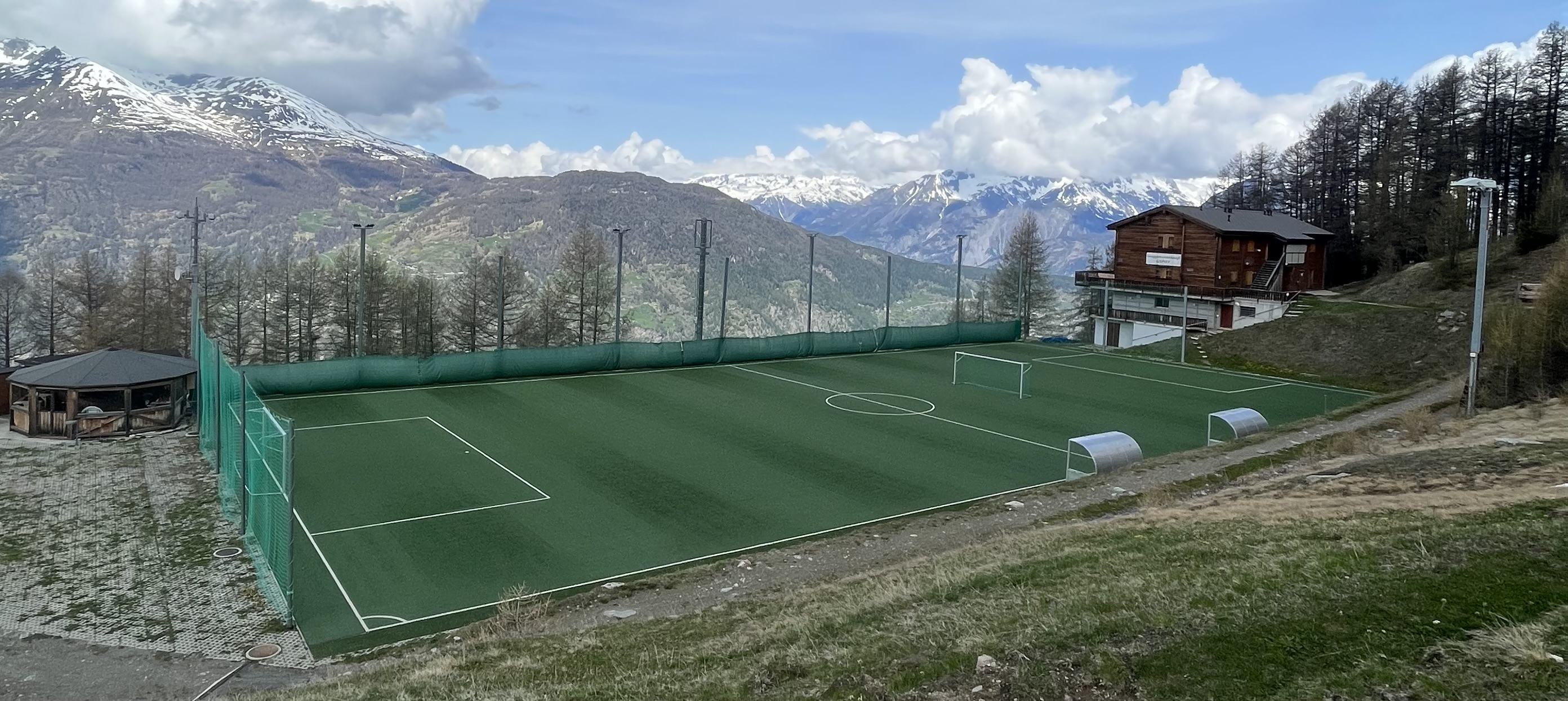
The highest football pitch in Europe, Ottmar Hitzfeld Arena.

== General information ==
The traffic-free village of Gspon is at an altitude of 1,899 metres (6,230 ft). Access is only by cableway from Stalden via Staldenried. The village is the location of the St. Anna Chapel, built in 1691. The highest irrigation channels that are still in operation are located here, while two ski lifts are open during the winter for downhill skiers. The landscape can also be explored on snowshoes.

The Bischofwäg, leading from Staldenried through pine forest and the Breiterbach Gorge to Visperterminen, was the path along which the bishop of Sion travelled. Visperterminen has the highest vineyard in Europe on a sheltered slope at an altitude of 1,150 metres (3,770 ft). A viniculture theme path starts at Visp railway station. The Suonen hiking trail circuit to Finileri runs through forests and alpine pastures and alongside the historic irrigation channels. A more challenging trail leads from Gspon via the Gebidum and Bistinen Passes to the Simplon Pass.
