= Ottmar Hitzfeld Arena =

Swiss sports stadium

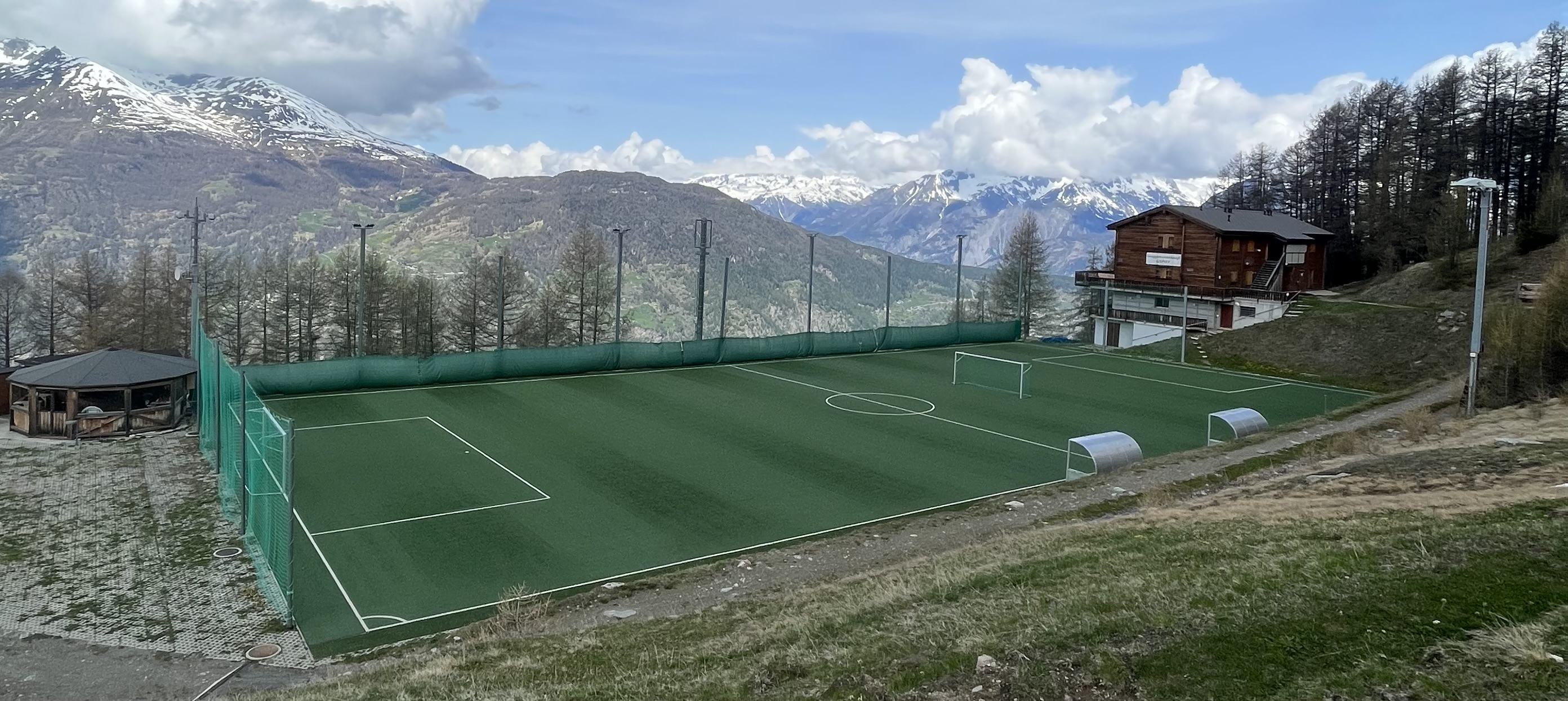
- Ottmar Hitzfeld field, Gspon
- Interactive map of Ottmar Hitzfeld Arena
- Address: Gspon, 3933; Gspon; Switzerland
- Coordinates: 46°13′39″N 07°54′08″E
- Elevation: 2,012 m (6,601 ft)

The Ottmar Hitzfeld Arena is a sports stadium in the village Gspon in Canton Valais, Switzerland. It is the highest altitude stadium in Europe at 1,922 metres (6,306 ft) above sea level. It is the home of amateur football club FC Gspon and is named after football manager Ottmar Hitzfeld.

== Location ==
The stadium is located in the hamlet Gspon, which is 800 meters above the Staldenried municipality in Canton Valais. Gspon has only five inhabitants, but Staldenried has more than 500. Gspon has no cars nor traffic, and was chosen as the site location because lower lands are used for agriculture. The stadium is known for being the highest football pitch in Europe, 1,922 meters (6,306 ft) above sea level.

== Design ==
Football was initially played here on gravel, and later there was a surface of wood chips and sand. The pitch has a safety net on three sides to prevent footballs being kicked into the valley, although it is claimed that a thousand footballs have been lost. Up to two-hundred spectators attend the home games and there is no entrance fee. The pitch is smaller than the average football pitch and only eight instead of eleven players take part in the game which has no offside rule.

In 2009 a field of artificial turf was paid for by the former football trainer of the Swiss national football team Ottmar Hitzfeld, hence its name. The teams and spectators travel to the matches by cable car. The original cable car from Staldenried held twelve people. In 2019, a new cable car with cabins that held 25 passengers was installed.

Because of the elevated altitude the air is thinner and some think that gives the home team an advantage. The pitch, which is as large as the available flat surface permits, is smaller than traditional pitches. In winter, the pitch is covered by snow and part of a ski piste.

== History ==
The FC Gspon was established in 1974. Until 1986 the football club was active in the amateur football in Valais. In 1984, with the support of FC Gspon, the Mountain Village championship was established in Switzerland. According to the club legend, the pitch's location close to a cliff made it lose around a thousand footballs. Timo Konietzka, who scored the first goal of the German Association Football in 1963, had some sympathy and he supplied more footballs in 1990.

The stadium was the host of the European Football Championship of Mountain Villages, first held in 2008 which was organized in collaboration with the European Football Championship in Austria and Switzerland. The Championship in Gspon was won by Spain who beat Sweden in the final. Switzerland was third after defeating France.

Since 2008 FC Gspon has a men's and a women's team who play on the arena.

== Reception ==
Reader's Digest put Hitzfeld Stadium at number one on their list of weirdest stadiums, while Bleacher Report put the stadium on their list of 20 sports stadiums with the most beautiful views.
