= FC Gumefens/Sorens =

Swiss football club

FC Gumefens Sorens
- Founded: 1962
- League: Liga 2.
- 2008/2009: 13th

FC Gumefens Sorens are a Swiss football team currently playing in 2. Liga Interregional, the fourth tier in the Swiss football pyramid Group 2. The club was formed in 1962. They finished 2011/2012 season in 1st position resulting in promotion.

== Staff and board members ==
- Trainer: Hervé Thimonier
- Women's football team's Trainer: Luc Pythoud
- President: Eric Ropraz
- Secretary : Isabelle Maillard
- Treasurer : Sylviane Meyer
