= Nicolas Kehrli =

Swiss footballer (born 1983)

Personal information
- Full name: Nicolas Kehrli
- Date of birth: 17 January 1983 (age 43)
- Height: 1.85 m (6 ft 1 in)
- Position: Centre back

Youth career
- FC Schwarzenburg
- Young Boys

Senior career*
Years	Team	Apps	(Gls)
2002–2005	Young Boys	28	(1)
2005	Lausanne-Sport	8	(0)
2006	Baden	11	(0)
2006–2007	SC Kriens	12	(1)
2007–2011	Biel-Bienne	99	(0)
2011–2019	Breitenrain	144	(8)
- * Club domestic league appearances and goals

Nicolas Kehrli (born 17 January 1983) is a retired Swiss association footballer.

He also played for BSC Young Boys at Swiss Super League.
