= SC Goldau =

Swiss football club

- Full name: Sportclub Goldau
- Founded: 1946; 79 years ago
- Ground: Sportanlage Tierpark, Goldau
- Capacity: 1,500
- Chairman: Sandro Kiener
- Coach: Beat Appert
- League: 2. Liga
- 2024–25: 2. Liga Interregional Group 3, 16th of 16 (relegated)

SC Goldau are a Swiss football team based in Goldau, Switzerland. The team set to playing in 2. Liga from 2025–26, the sixth tier in the Swiss football after relegation from 2. Liga Interregional in 2024–25.

== History ==
The club was formed in 1946.

They finished 2008–09 season in 9th position.

SC Goldau secure relegation to 2. Liga from 2025–26 after finishing last place in 2. Liga Interregional Group 3.

== Staff and board members ==
As of the 2024–25 season.

- Manager: Beat Appert
- Assistant Manager: Ivo Bürgi
- Goalkeeper Coach: Guido Stadelmann
- Massage: Tanja Schwärzler
- Team manager: Theo Kuny
- Supervisor: Peter Riebli
- President: Sandro Kiener
- Vice President & Commission Player: Marcel Gwerder
- Finance: Erwin Zurfluh
- Sports Director: Mario Schuler
- Secretary : Mara Keiser
- Commission Junior: Olivier Flückiger
- Communication: Simon Krienbühl
- Sponsor: Roberto D'Amato
- Occasion: Nick Schafflützel
- Infrastructure: Raphael Gwerder
