= FC Bazenheid =

Swiss football club

- Full name: Football Club Bazenheid
- Founded: 23 November 1938; 87 years ago
- Ground: Ifang
- Capacity: 1000

FC Bazenheid is a football team based in Bazenheid, Switzerland. They play in the 2. Liga Interregional, currently the highest tier they reached within the Swiss football pyramid.

Former players include Elsad Zverotic and Philipp Muntwiler.
