= FC Echichens =

Swiss football club

- Full name: Football Club Echichens
- Founded: 1966; 59 years ago
- Ground: Terrain Grand Record; Echichens
- Capacity: 600
- Chairman: Almeida Marlène
- Manager: Mehdi Zaidi
- League: 2. Liga Interregional
- 2024–25: Group 1, 12th of 16
Home colours	Away colours

FC Echichens is a Swiss football club based in Echichens, canton of Vaud. The team currently play in 2. Liga Interregional , the fifth tier of Swiss football.

Since 2007 they are competing in Group 1 of the 2e League in the "Association Cantonale Vaudoise de Football" region.

The football club was famous for having seven-time World Formula One Champion Michael Schumacher in their squad.

== History ==
FC Echichens was founded in 1966.
