= Swiss football league system =

League competition

The Swiss football league system, is a series of interconnected leagues for association football clubs in Switzerland, with seven teams from Liechtenstein, and one each from exclaves of Germany and Italy, also competing. The system has a hierarchical format with promotion and relegation between leagues at different levels, allowing even the smallest club the possibility of ultimately rising to the very top of the system. The first two levels of the system are collectively called Swiss Football League.

Liechtenstein does not have its own national league, therefore its teams compete in the Swiss leagues; see List of association football clubs playing in the league of another country.

== System ==
=== (From 2023–24 onwards) ===
Level	Divisions				
	Swiss Football Association				
Pro	Swiss Football League				
1	Brack Super League; 12 clubs ↓ 1 relegation spot + 1 relegation play-off spot				
2	Dieci Challenge League; 10 clubs ↑ 1 promotion spot + 1 promotion play-off spot ↓ 1 relegation spot				
	First League				
3	Hoval Promotion League; 18 clubs ↑ 1 promotion spot ↓ 2 relegation spots				
4	1st League Classic; 48 clubs divided into 3 groups ↑ 2 promotion spots (via 8 promotion play-off spots) ↓ 2 relegation spots (each group)				
4	Group 1; 16 clubs		Group 2; 16 clubs	Group 3; 16 clubs	
	Amateur League				
5	2nd League Interregional; 70 clubs divided into 5 groups				
5	Group 1; 14 clubs	Group 2; 14 clubs	Group 3; 14 clubs	Group 4; 14 clubs	Group 5; 14 clubs
	Regional Association				
6	2. Liga; 17 regional groups, 204 clubs				
7	3. Liga; 46 regional groups, 563 clubs				
8	4. Liga; 75 regional groups, 852 clubs				
9	5. Liga; 67 regional groups, 685 clubs				
10	Kreisliga/Bezirksliga				

=== (Until 2022–23) ===
Up until and including the 2022–23 Swiss Super League the pyramid was set up as follows:

Level	Divisions					
1	Super League; 10 clubs					
2	Challenge League; 10 clubs					
3	Promotion League; 16 clubs up to and including the 2021–22 season 18 clubs in the 2022–23 season					
4	1st League (Group 1); 14 clubs		1st League (Group 2); 14 clubs		1st League (Group 3); 14 clubs	
5	2. Liga Interregional; (Group 1); 14 clubs	2. Liga Interregional; (Group 2); 14 clubs	2. Liga Interregional; (Group 3); 14 clubs	2. Liga Interregional; (Group 4); 14 clubs	2. Liga Interregional; (Group 5); 14 clubs	2. Liga Interregional; (Group 6); 14 clubs
6	2. Liga; 17 regional groups, 204 clubs					
7	3. Liga; 46 regional groups, 563 clubs					
8	4. Liga; 75 regional groups, 852 clubs					
9	5. Liga; 67 regional groups, 685 clubs					
10	Kreisliga/Bezirksliga					
