= SC Düdingen =

Swiss football club

- Full name: SC Düdingen
- Founded: 1924
- Ground: Stadion Birchhölzli, Düdingen, Switzerland
- Capacity: 3,000
- Chairman: Steve Baeriswyl, Thomas Perren, Lukas Herren
- Manager: Sead Hajrovic
- League: 2. Liga Interregional
- 2024–25: Group 2, 4th of 16
Home colours	Away colours

SC Düdingen is a Swiss football club based in Düdingen, Canton Fribourg. They currently play in the Swiss 1. Liga, the fourth tier of Swiss football.

== History ==
The club was formed in July 1924 by a group of young men at the Hotel Bahnhof in Düdingen. The first board of directors at the club consisted of the President Romain de Meyer, his vice-president Jules Sapin and Treasurer Louis Vuarnoz. The club did not immediately seek affiliation with the Swiss Football Association, they mostly played friendly matches. In 1974 the club gained their first promotion to the 2nd tier.
