= SV Höngg =

Swiss football club

- Full name: Sportverein Höngg
- Founded: 1941; 84 years ago
- Ground: Hönggerberg
- Capacity: 1,000
- Chairman: Martin Gubler
- Coach: Stefan Goll
- League: 1. Liga Classic
- 2024–25: Group 3, 11th of 16
Home colours	Away colours

Sportverein Höngg is a football club from Zürich, Switzerland. The club was founded in 1941 from a merger of the former Höngg Football Club and the Talchern Sports Club and is currently playing in the 1. Liga Classic, the fourth tier of Swiss football.

== Players ==
Note: Flags indicate national team as defined under FIFA eligibility rules; some limited exceptions apply. Players may hold more than one non-FIFA nationality.

No.	Pos.	Nation	Player
1	GK	SUI	Reto Eigenmann
2	DF	SUI	Fabian Graf
3	DF	SUI	Lukas Widmer
4	DF	SUI	Laurent Luks
5	DF	SWE	Mikael Gren
6	MF	SUI	Rafael Dössegger
7	MF	SUI	Cedric Membrez
8	MF	SUI	Michael Ryser
9	FW	SUI	Toni Dupovac
10	MF	SUI	Danilo Infante
11	MF	SRB	Ivan Medakovic
12	FW	SUI	Thomas Eugster

No.	Pos.	Nation	Player
13	DF	SUI	Tyron Pepperday
14	MF	SUI	Marc Capeder
15	DF	SUI	Marcel Aisslinger
16	MF	SUI	Philipp Zogg
17	DF	ITA	Daniele Demasi
18	MF	SUI	Paul Würmli
19	FW	SRB	Marko Marjanovic
20	MF	SUI	Stephan Boos
21	FW	ITA	Salvatore Lombardo
22	GK	SUI	Ronny Petro
23	MF	SUI	Simon Krappl

== Staff and board members ==
- Trainer: Stefan Goll
- Assistant Trainer: Simon Krappl
- Goalkeeper Coach: Guy Huber
- Physio: Bea Rechsteiner
- President: Martin Gubler
- Vice President: Daniel Stein
- Secretary : Walter Söll
- Treasurer : Roger Edelmann
