= SC Binningen =

Swiss football club

- Full name: Sport Club Binningen
- Nickname(s): SCB
- Founded: 1920
- Ground: Spiegelfeld
- Capacity: 1,800
- Owner: Christian Kunz
- League: 2. Liga Interregional

Sport Club Binningen is a Swiss football club based in Binningen.

Founded in 1920, the club competes in 2. Liga, the fifth tier of the Swiss Football League. They play at Spiegelfeld, a stadium in Binningen which opened in 2005 and has a capacity of 1,300. The club has competed in the Swiss Cup on a regular basis.
