= 2. Liga (Switzerland) =

- Country: Switzerland
- Other club from: Liechtenstein
- Confederation: UEFA
- Number of clubs: 215
- Level on pyramid: 6
- Promotion to: 2. Liga Interregional
- Relegation to: 3. Liga
- Domestic cup: Swiss Cup
- Current: 2025–26 Swiss 2. Liga

2. Liga is the sixth tier of the Swiss football league system. The division is split into 17 groups of 12, 13 or 14 teams by geographical region. Teams usually play within their own canton.

== Regional associations ==
- Aargauischer Fussballverband (AFV)
- Fussballverband Bern/Jura - Association de football Berne/Jura (FVBJ-AFBJ)
- Innerschweizerischer Fussballverband (IFV)
- Fussballverband Nordwestschweiz (FVNWS)
- Ostschweizer Fussballverband (OFV)
- Solothurner Kantonal-Fussballverband (SKFV)
- Fussballverband Region Zürich (FVRZ)
- Federazione ticinese di calcio (FTC)
- Association fribourgeoise de football - Freiburger Fussballverband (AFF-FFV)
- Association cantonale genevoise de football (ACGF)
- Association neuchâteloise de football (ANF)
- Association valaisanne de football (AVF)
- Association cantonale vaudoise de football (ACVF)
