= FC Martigny-Sports =

Swiss football club

- Full name: Football Club Martigny-Sports
- Founded: 1917; 108 years ago
- Ground: Stade d'Octodure; Martigny
- Capacity: 7,000
- Chairman: Benoît Bender
- Manager: Hugo Raczynski
- League: 1. Liga Classic
- 2024–25: 2. Liga Interregional Group 1, 2nd of 16 (promoted)
Home colours	Away colours

Football Club Martigny-Sports, is a football club from Martigny, canton of Valais in Switzerland. As of 2025, the club is playing in 1. Liga Classic, the fourth tier of Swiss football.

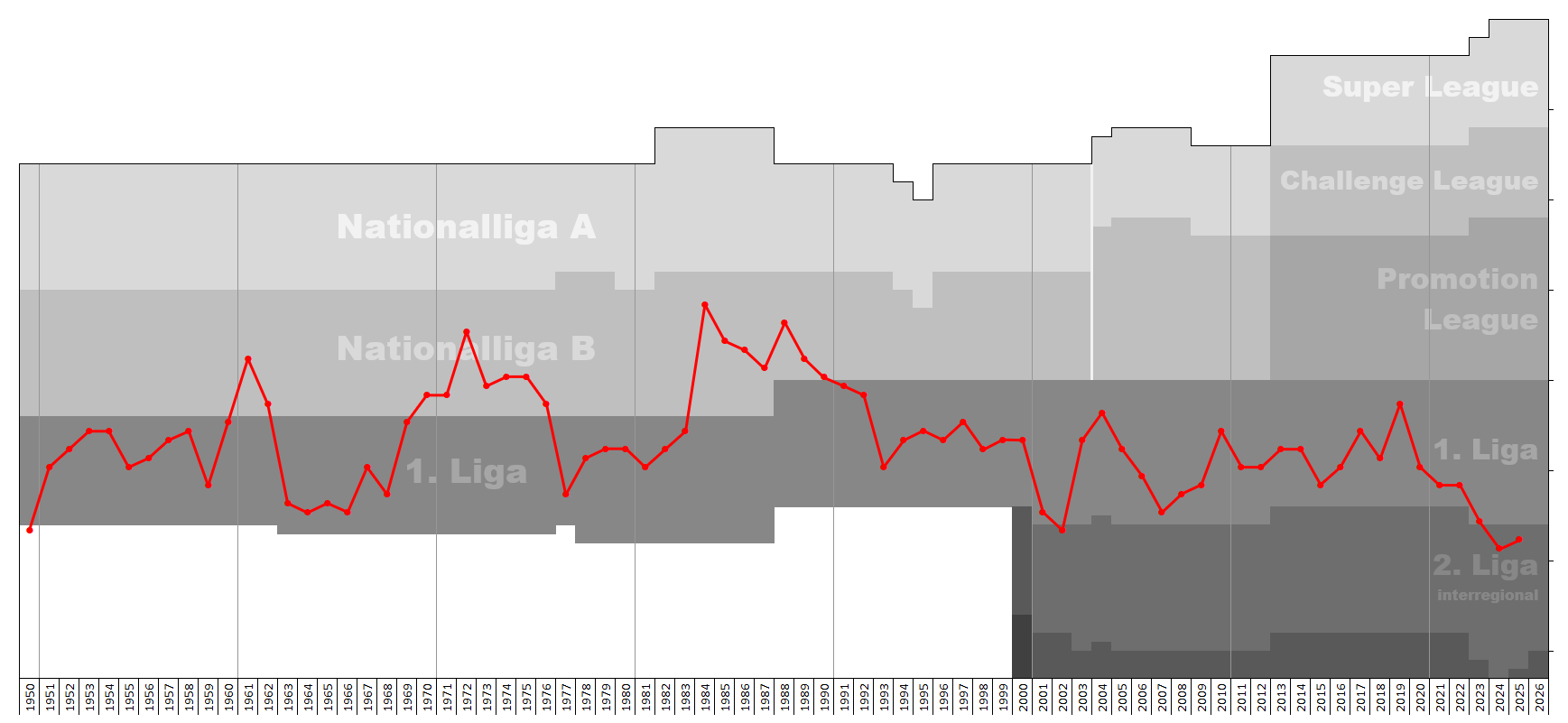
Chart of FC Martigny-Sports table positions in the Swiss football league system

== History ==
In 2024–25, Martigny-Sports secure promotion to 1. Liga Classic from next season after finishing as runner-up place.

== Crest ==
Former logo

== Stadium ==
Martigny-Sports will play in Stade d'Octodure with 7,000 seats.
