= 2. Liga Interregional =

- Founded: 1924; 102 years ago 2000; 26 years ago (refounded)
- Country: Switzerland
- Other club from: Liechtenstein
- Confederation: UEFA
- Number of clubs: 70 (in 5 groups of 14)
- Level on pyramid: 5
- Promotion to: 1st League Classic
- Relegation to: 2. Liga
- Domestic cup: Swiss Cup
- Current champions: FC Amical Saint-Prex BSC Old Boys Zug 94 FC Widnau (2024–25)
- Website: football.ch
- Current: 2025–26 2. Liga Interregional

2. Liga Interregional (2nd League Interregional in English) is the fifth tier of the Swiss football league system. From 2000 to 2012, it was the country's fourth level. From 2013, the league was demoted to fifth level. The division is split into 5 groups of 14 teams since 2025–26 season onwards, by geographical region.

== History ==
Former logo

2. Liga Interregional founded in 1924, refounded in 2000 the league between 1. Liga Classic and 2. Liga.

=== League Names ===
Since the creation in 1924, the league has been called :

- 1924–1925 : Division 1
- 1925–1930 : Serie D
- 1930–1931 : 5. Liga
- 1931–1944 : 4. Liga
- 1944–1984 : 3. Liga
- 1984–1989 : 3. Liga Elite
- 1989–2000 : 3. Liga

Since the creation of Amateur League in 2000, the league has been called :

- 2000–2012 : 2. Liga
- Since 2012 : 2. Liga Interregional

== Clubs ==
The clubs in the league for the 2025–26 season will be divided into 5 groups of 14 teams.

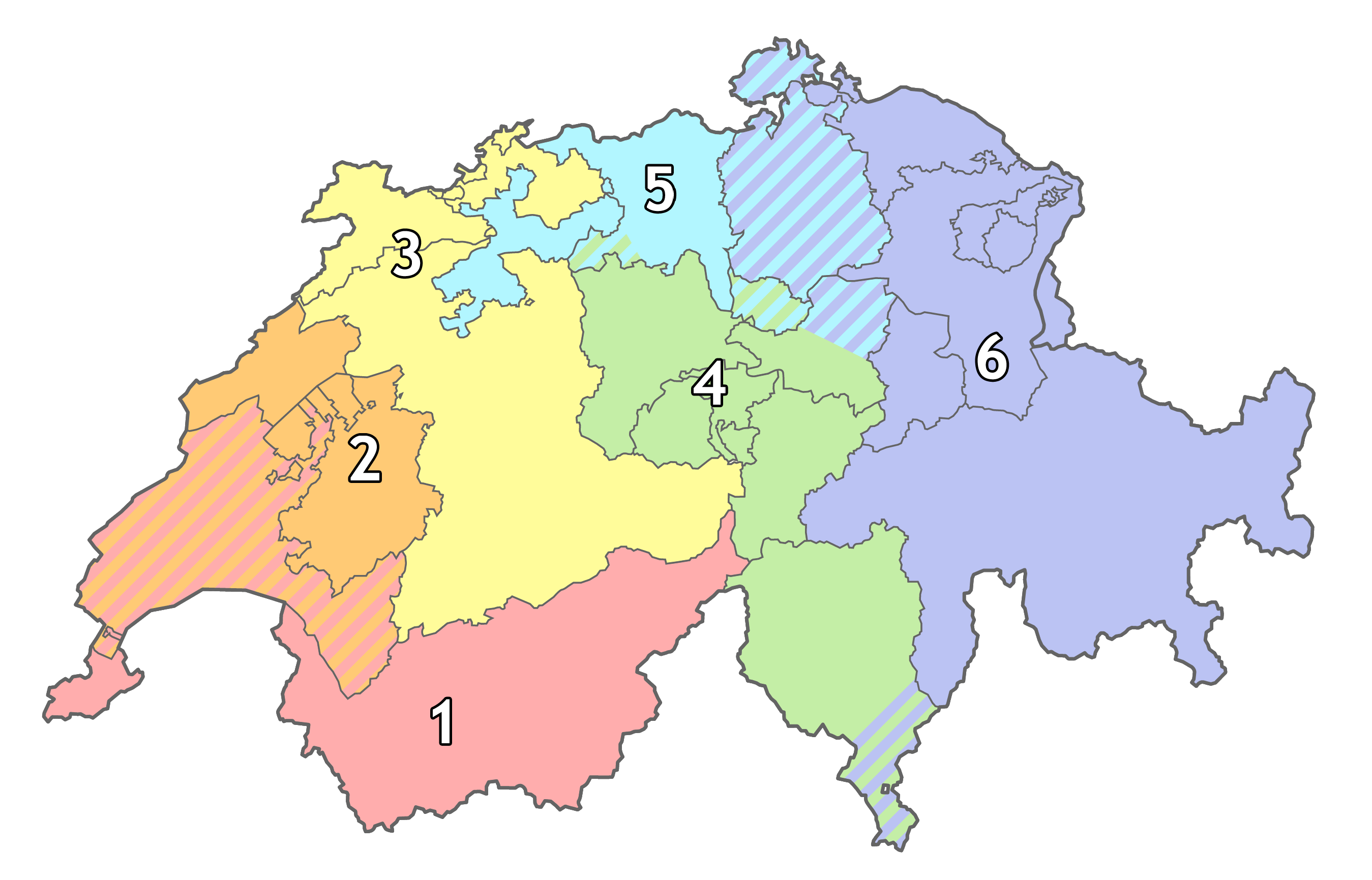
Groups of 2. Liga Interregional as of season 2019/20

=== Group 1 ===
| Club | Location |
|---|---|
| FC Champagne Sports | (Vaud) Champagne |
| FC Collex-Bossy | (Canton of Geneva) Collex-Bossy |
| Concordia Lausanne | (Vaud) Lausanne |
| Dardania Lausanne | (Vaud) Lausanne |
| FC Echichens | (Vaud) Échichens |
| Olympique de Genève | (Canton of Geneva) Geneva |
| Pully Football | (Vaud) Pully |
| Signal FC Bernex-Confignon | (Canton of Geneva) Bernex |
| Stade Lausanne Ouchy II | (Vaud) Lausanne |
| US Terre Sainte | (Vaud) Commugny |
| UGS Genève | (Canton of Geneva) Geneva |
| USI Azzurri | (Canton of Geneva) Geneva |
| FC Vernier | (Canton of Geneva) Vernier |
| Yverdon Sport II | (Vaud) Yverdon-les-Bains |

=== Group 2 ===
| Club | Location |
|---|---|
| Bosna Neuchâtel | (Canton of Neuchâtel) Neuchâtel |
| FC Bosporus | (Canton of Bern) Ostermundigen |
| FC Cugy-Montet-Aumont | (Vaud) Cugy |
| SC Düdingen | (Canton of Fribourg) Düdingen |
| FC Farvagny-Ogoz | (Canton of Fribourg) Farvagny |
| AS Italiana | (Canton of Bern) Bern |
| FC Köniz | (Canton of Bern) Köniz |
| SV Lyss | (Canton of Bern) Lyss |
| FC Muri-Gümligen | (Canton of Bern) Muri bei Bern |
| CS Romontois | (Canton of Fribourg) Romont |
| FC Saint-Blaise | (Canton of Neuchâtel) Saint-Blaise |
| FC Savièse | (Valais) Savièse |
| FC Thun II | (Canton of Bern) Thun |
| FC Ueberstorf | (Canton of Fribourg) Ueberstorf |

=== Group 3 ===
| Club | Location |
|---|---|
| FC Ajoie-Montierri | (Canton of Jura) Cornol |
| FC Allschwil | (Basel-Landschaft) Allschwil |
| SC Binningen | (Basel-Landschaft) Binningen |
| FC Bülach | (Canton of Zurich) Bülach |
| SC Dornach | (Canton of Solothurn) Dornach |
| FC Dübendorf | (Canton of Zurich) Dübendorf |
| FC Kirchberg Bern | (Canton of Bern) Kirchberg |
| FC Lachen-Altendorf | (Canton of Schwyz) Lachen |
| FC Liestal | (Basel-Landschaft) Liestal |
| FC Pratteln | (Basel-Landschaft) Pratteln |
| Red Star Zürich | (Canton of Zurich) Zürich |
| FC Thalwil | (Canton of Zurich) Thalwil |
| FC Uster | (Canton of Zurich) Uster |
| Zurich City SC | (Canton of Zurich) Zurich |

=== Group 4 ===
| Club | Location |
|---|---|
| AS Castello | (Ticino) Castel San Pietro |
| SC Cham II | (Canton of Zug) Cham |
| SC Emmen | (Canton of Lucerne) Emmen |
| FC Emmenbrücke | (Canton of Lucerne) Emmen |
| FC Gambarogno-Contone | (Ticino) Gambarogno |
| FC Härkingen | (Canton of Solothurn) Härkingen |
| FC Hergiswil | (Nidwalden) Hergiswil |
| FC Ibach | (Canton of Schwyz) Ibach |
| FC Klingnau | (Aargau) Klingnau |
| FC Locarno | (Ticino) Locarno |
| FC Malcantone | (Ticino) Caslano |
| FC Rothrist | (Aargau) Rothrist |
| FC Rotkreuz | (Canton of Zug) Rotkreuz |
| FC Sursee | (Canton of Lucerne) Sursee |

=== Group 5 ===
| Club | Location |
|---|---|
| FC Allstätten | (Canton of St. Gallen) Altstätten |
| FC Arbon 05 | (Thurgau) Arbon |
| FC Balzers | (Liechtenstein) Balzers |
| FC Chur 97 | (Grisons) Chur |
| KF Dardania St. Gallen | (Canton of St. Gallen) St. Gallen |
| FC Gossau | (Canton of St. Gallen) Gossau |
| FC Linth 04 | (Canton of Glarus) Niederurnen |
| FC Rorschach-Goldach 17 | (Canton of St. Gallen) Goldach |
| FC Schaffhausen II | (Canton of Schaffhausen) Schaffhausen |
| Seefeld Zürich | (Canton of Zurich) Zurich |
| FC Seuzach | (Canton of Zurich) Seuzach |
| FC Uzwil | (Canton of St. Gallen) Uzwil |
| FC Weesen | (Canton of St. Gallen) Weesen |
| FC Wil II | (Canton of St. Gallen) Wil |

== League results ==
2nd League / 2nd League Interregional Champions
| Season | Group 1 | Group 2 | Group 3 | Group 4 | Group 5 | Group 6 |
|---|---|---|---|---|---|---|
| 2000–01 | (Valais) FC Sion II | (Vaud) FC Baulmes | (Basel-Stadt) FC Basel II | (Canton of Lucerne) FC Luzern II | (Canton of Zurich) FC Zürich II | (Grisons) Chur 97 |
| 2001–02 | (Vaud) ES FC Malley | (Valais) FC Martigny-Sports | (Aargau) SC Zofingen | (Ticino) GC Biaschesi | (Aargau) FC Aarau II | (Thurgau) FC Frauenfeld |
| 2002–03 | (Valais) FC Sierre | (Canton of Bern) BSC Young Boys II | (Canton of Solothurn) SC Dornach | (Canton of Zurich) FC Seefeld | (Canton of Zug) SC Cham | 5 groups (from 2002 until 2010) |
| 2003–04 | (Vaud) FC Lausanne-Sport | (Canton of Jura) FC Alle | (Aargau) FC Brugg | (Canton of Bern) FC Langenthal | (Appenzell Ausserrhoden) FC Herisau | 5 groups (from 2002 until 2010) |
| 2004–05 | (Canton of Geneva) FC Bernex-Confignon | (Canton of Fribourg) SC Düdingen | (Canton of Lucerne) Kickers Lucerne | (Basel-Landschaft) SV Muttenz | (Canton of St. Gallen) FC Rapperswil-Jona | 5 groups (from 2002 until 2010) |
| 2005–06 | (Valais) FC Sion II | (Canton of Fribourg) FC La Tour/Le Pâquier | (Ticino) FC Stabio | (Canton of Solothurn) FC Olten | (Canton of St. Gallen) FC Gossau | 5 groups (from 2002 until 2010) |
| 2006–07 | (Valais) FC Savièse | (Canton of Bern) SV Lyss | (Canton of Lucerne) FC Schötz | (Basel-Stadt) BSC Old Boys | (Canton of Zurich) FC Küsnacht | 5 groups (from 2002 until 2010) |
| 2007–08 | (Canton of Geneva) CS Chênois | (Vaud) FC Le Mont | (Canton of Lucerne) FC Emmenbrücke | (Canton of Zurich) SV Höngg | (Liechtenstein) USV Eschen/Mauren | 5 groups (from 2002 until 2010) |
| 2008–09 | (Canton of Geneva) Grand-Lancy FC | (Canton of Bern) FC Breitenrain | (Ticino) FC Lugano II | (Basel-Landschaft) FC Laufen | (Grisons) Chur 97 | 5 groups (from 2002 until 2010) |
| 2009–10 | (Vaud) US Terre Sainte | (Canton of Bern) FC Thun II | (Aargau) FC Aarau II | (Canton of Solothurn) SC Dornach | (Canton of St. Gallen) SC Brühl | 5 groups (from 2002 until 2010) |
| 2010–11 | (Canton of Geneva) Servette FC U21 | (Canton of Fribourg) FC Bulle | (Canton of Neuchâtel) FC Serrières | (Aargau) FC Muri | (Canton of Zurich) SV Höngg | (Liechtenstein) FC Balzers |
| 2011–12 | (Vaud) US Terre Sainte | (Canton of Bern) FC Köniz | (Basel-Stadt) FC Black Stars Basel | (Canton of Zug) Zug 94 | (Canton of Zurich) FC Wettswil-Bonstetten | (Thurgau) FC Kreuzlingen |
| 2012–13 | (Vaud) FC Azzurri 90 Lausanne | (Vaud) FC Bavois | (Canton of Neuchâtel) Neuchâtel Xamax FCS | (Canton of Lucerne) FC Sursee | (Canton of Zurich) FC Thalwil | (Grisons) Chur 97 |
| 2013–14 | (Vaud) FC Stade-Lausanne-Ouchy | Team Vaud U21 | (Canton of Bern) FC Bern | (Ticino) AC Taverne | (Canton of Zurich) FC Dietikon | (Canton of Zurich) FC Seuzach |
| 2014–15 | (Canton of Geneva) Signal FC Bernex-Confignon | (Canton of Neuchâtel) FC La Chaux-de-Fonds | (Canton of Bern) FC Thun II | (Nidwalden) SC Buochs | (Canton of Zurich) FC United Zürich | (Canton of Zurich) FC Kosova |
| 2015–16 | (Vaud) FC Vevey Sports 1899 | (Vaud) FC La Sarraz-Eclépenz | (Canton of Jura) FC Bassecourt | (Ticino) AC Bellinzona | (Canton of Zurich) FC Red Star Zürich | (Canton of Zurich) FC Seefeld |
| 2016–17 | (Canton of Geneva) Meyrin FC | (Canton of Fribourg) FC Portalban/Gletterens | (Canton of Bern) FC Langenthal | (Canton of Lucerne) FC Kickers Luzern | (Canton of Zurich) SV Höngg | (Canton of Zurich) FC Kosova |
| 2017–18 | (Canton of Geneva) CS Chênois | (Canton of Fribourg) FC Bulle | (Canton of Bern) FC Biel-Bienne | (Nidwalden) FC Hergiswil | (Aargau) SC Zofingen | (Canton of Glarus) FC Linth 04 |
| 2018–19 | (Canton of Geneva) Olympique de Geneve FC | (Vaud) US Terre Sainte | (Basel-Landschaft) SV Muttenz | (Ticino) FC Paradiso | (Canton of Zurich) FC Dietikon | (Liechtenstein) FC Balzers |
| 2019–20 | (Canton of Geneva) Servette FC II | (Canton of Fribourg) SC Düdingen | (Canton of Bern) FC Moutier | (Canton of Lucerne) FC Willisau | (Aargau) FC Muri | (Grisons) Chur 97 |
| 2020–21 | (Valais) FC Monthey | (Vaud) FC La Sarraz-Eclépens | (Canton of Bern) FC Thun II | Team Ticino | (Canton of Schwyz) FC Freienbach | (Canton of St. Gallen) FC Uzwil |
| 2021–22 | (Canton of Geneva) FC Servette II | (Canton of Fribourg) FC Portalban-Gletterens | (Canton of Solothurn) SC Dornach | (Ticino) AC Taverne | (Canton of Zug) FC Rotkreuz | (Canton of St. Gallen) FC Weesen |
| 2022–23 | (Vaud) Pully Football | Team Vaud U21 | (Canton of Zurich) FC Dietikon | (Ticino) FC Mendrisio | (Liechtenstein) FC Balzers | 5 groups (for 2022–23) |

| Season | Group 1 | Group 2 | Group 3 | Group 4 |
4 Groups from 2023–24 until 2024–25
| 2023–24 | (Canton of Geneva) Lancy FC | (Canton of Bern) FC Prishtina Bern | (Ticino) FC Collina d'Oro | (Canton of Schaffhausen) SV Schaffhausen |
| 2024–25 | (Vaud) FC Amical Saint-Prex | (Basel-Stadt) BSC Old Boys | (Canton of Zug) Zug 94 | (Canton of St. Gallen) FC Widnau |

| Season | Group 1 | Group 2 | Group 3 | Group 4 | Group 5 |
5 Groups from 2025–26 onwards
| 2025–26 | | | | | |
