= Jayson Leutwiler =

Swiss-Canadian soccer player (born 1989)

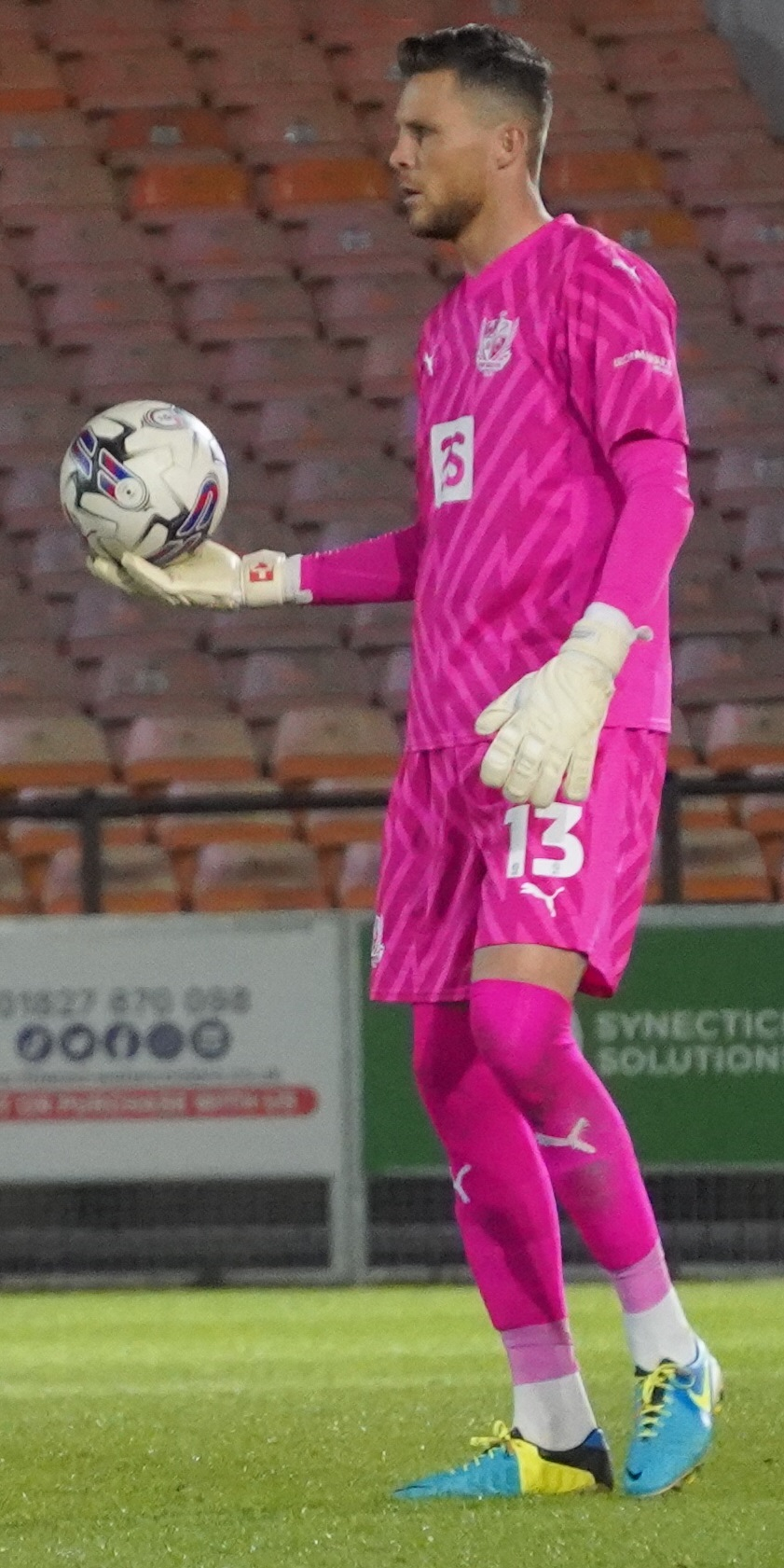
- Leutwiler with Port Vale in 2023

Personal information
- Full name: Jayson William Leutwiler
- Date of birth: 25 April 1989 (age 37)
- Place of birth: Neuchâtel, Switzerland
- Height: 1.91 m (6 ft 3 in)
- Position: Goalkeeper

Youth career
- 1994–2002: FC Cornaux
- 2002–2005: Neuchâtel Xamax
- 2005–2007: FC Basel

Senior career*
Years	Team	Apps	(Gls)
2007–2012	Basel	0	(0)
2007	→ Concordia Basel (loan)	0	(0)
2009–2010	→ Yverdon-Sport (loan)	30	(0)
2010	→ Wohlen (loan)	15	(0)
2012	→ Schaffhausen (loan)	14	(0)
2012–2014	Middlesbrough	3	(0)
2014–2017	Shrewsbury Town	118	(0)
2017–2020	Blackburn Rovers	6	(0)
2020–2021	Fleetwood Town	16	(0)
2021	Huddersfield Town	0	(0)
2021–2023	Oldham Athletic	22	(0)
2023–2024	Port Vale	0	(0)
Total		224	(0)

International career
2005	Switzerland U16	2	(0)
2006–2007	Switzerland U18	1	(0)
2008	Switzerland U19	2	(0)
2008–2010	Switzerland U20	3	(0)
2016–2017	Canada	3	(0)
- * Club domestic league appearances and goals

Jayson William Leutwiler (born 25 April 1989) is a former professional soccer player who played as a goalkeeper. He was capped by Switzerland up to under-20 level. He later transferred his national allegiance to Canada, receiving his first call-up to the national team in October 2016. He was chosen for their squads at the CONCACAF Gold Cup in 2017, 2019 and 2021.

A product of the Basel academy, Leutwiler never played a first-team game for the club and instead spent time on loan at Concordia Basel, Yverdon-Sport, Wohlen, and Schaffhausen. He signed with English Championship club Middlesbrough in August 2012, where he would play five games in two seasons before joining Shrewsbury Town in June 2014. He immediately established himself as the club's first-choice goalkeeper, playing every league game as Shrewsbury secured promotion out of League Two at the end of the 2014–15 season, keeping a club record 23 clean sheets. He was signed by Blackburn Rovers for an undisclosed fee in August 2017, having made 140 appearances in three seasons with Shrewsbury.

Blackburn secured promotion out of League One at the end of the 2017–18 campaign, though Leutwiler made just 13 appearances in his three seasons at the club. He spent September 2020 to January 2021 at Fleetwood Town and then ended the 2020–21 season as a back-up goalkeeper at Huddersfield Town. He joined Oldham Athletic in June 2021, where he featured 31 times in two seasons before joining Port Vale in June 2023.

== Early life ==
Jayson William Leutwiler was born on 25 April 1989 in Neuchâtel, Switzerland. His parents, Jean-Marc and Pascale, were both born in Neuchâtel. He speaks French, German, and English. He holds dual Swiss/Canadian citizenship.

== Club career ==
=== Switzerland ===
At five, Leutwiler started his youth soccer with the local amateur club in Cornaux. In 2002, he moved to the youth system of Neuchâtel Xamax and stayed there until 2005. He was scouted by FC Basel in a match that Neuchâtel Xamax under-16s had lost 6–0.

In the summer of 2005, Leutwiler joined the youth department at FC Basel. He played in their U-18 team during the 2005–06 season under coach Patrick Rahmen and his assistant Marco Walker, and with them won both the Swiss U-18 championship and the U-19/18 national cup that season. Leutwiler also played with the U-18 team in the 2006–07 season and they were able to defend their championship title.

Leutwiler advanced to the U-21 team, but with future Switzerland and Borussia Mönchengladbach goalkeeper Yann Sommer also in this age class, Leutwiler needed loan spells to gain playing experience. A beginning of the 2007–08 season he was loaned out to Challenge League club Concordia Basel in exchange for their goalkeeper Riccardo Meili. But this experiment was broken off just a few weeks later as Sommer was loaned out to Vaduz, which led to Meili and Leutwiler returning to their parent clubs.

Leutwiler then joined Basel's first-team under head coach Christian Gross for their 2007–08 season]as third goalkeeper behind Franco Costanzo and Oliver Stöckli. He attended training with them, but because he was not going to obtain the required playing experience with them, he played in the U-21 team, in the third tier, under coach Patrick Rahmen. The team became division (group 2) winners in the 2007–08 season and became Swiss champions at the U-21 level. Because he was also in the first-team squad, he was also Swiss champion at senior level.

For the 2008–09 season, Basel had Costanzo as number one, Stöckli as number two and Sommer out on loan, leaving Leutwiler as the third-choice goalkeeper for FCB and again playing in the U-21 team, who in the 2008–09 season became division (group2) winners and again Swiss champions at the U-21 level.

For the 2009–10 Challenge League season, Leutwiler was loaned out to Yverdon-Sport, making his team debut for them in a 5–3 defeat at Thun on 26 July. He played 30 games during his time at the Stade Municipal. Then he spent the first half of the 2010–11 season out on loan at Wohlen, but was unable to hold the first-choice goalkeeper position, and returned to Basel early to again play in the U-21 team. He also played the beginning of the 2011–12 season, but on 27 January 2012, he joined 1. Liga club Schaffhausen on loan until the end of the 2011–12 season. By now, in the Basel first-team, Sommer was number one, Costanzo was forced to leave, Stöckli retired, but youngster Mirko Salvi was up and coming. So Leutwiler decided to move on.

=== Middlesbrough ===
On 14 August 2012, Leutwiler signed with English Championship club Middlesbrough following a trial spell. He had been scouted by Gary Gill, who arranged a trial through agent Gaetano Giallanza whilst Leutwiler was with Schaffhausen. He was allowed a run of games in pre-season friendlies whilst established number one Jason Steele was with the Great Britain Olympic team. He made his competitive debut in a 3–1 win away at Preston North End in the League Cup third round on 25 September.

He made his league debut for the club on 10 August 2013, in a 1–0 win over Charlton Athletic at The Valley, replacing Steele for the last 12 minutes shortly after Lukas Jutkiewicz had scored the only goal of the game. A week later, with Steele still injured, Leutwiler made his first league start at the Riverside Stadium against Blackpool; he conceded after 83 minutes from Chris Basham, but Marvin Emnes scored an equaliser in added time.

Leutwiler's third and final league appearance of the season came on 23 November, in Aitor Karanka's first match in charge, away to Leeds United; in the last minute of the first half, Steele was sent off for a foul on Dexter Blackstock and Leutwiler was brought on at the expense of Emnes in a 2–1 defeat. He was confirmed to be released by the club on 16 May 2014.

=== Shrewsbury Town ===
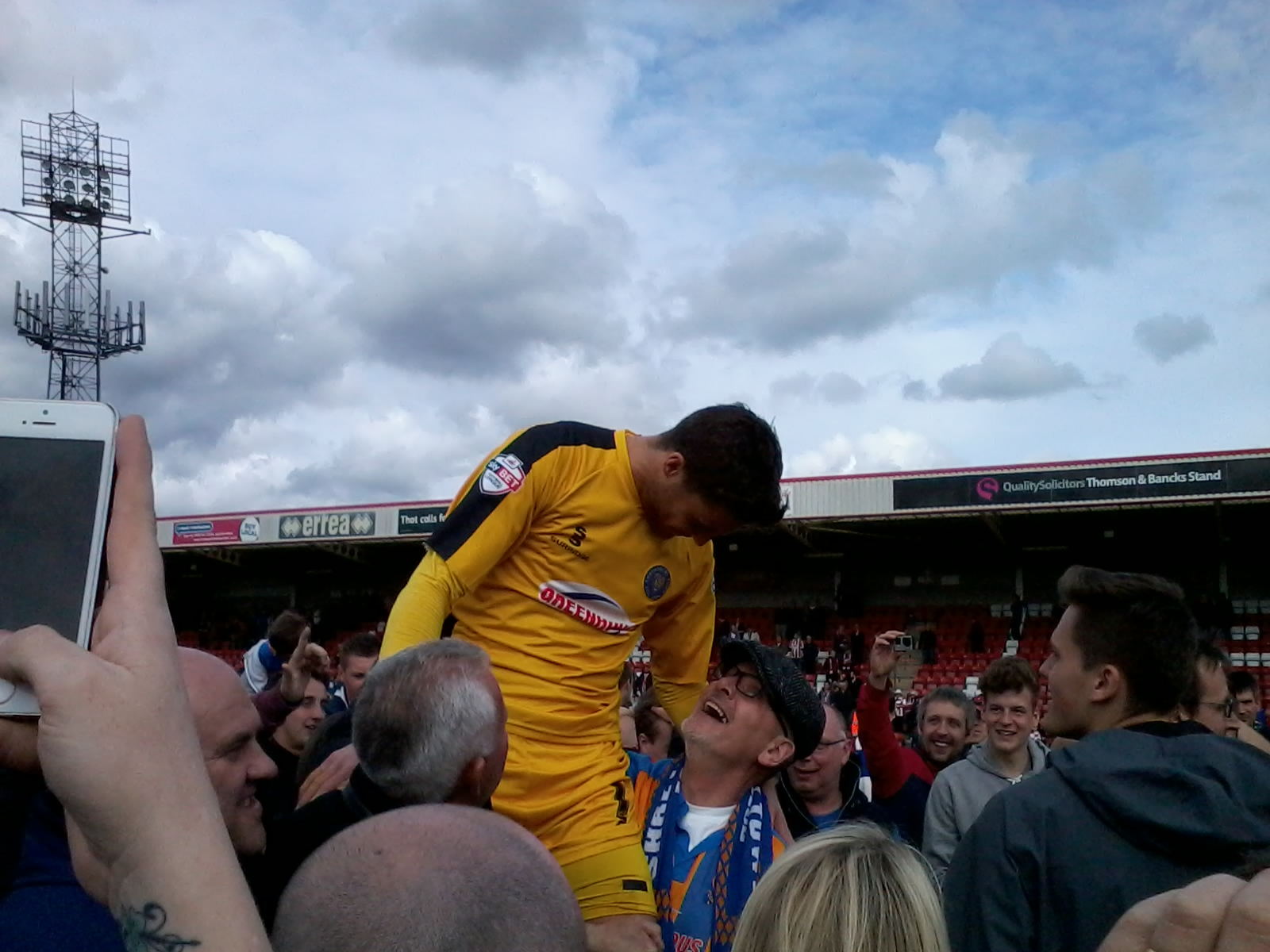
Leutwiler celebrates with Shrewsbury Town supporters after winning promotion to League One in April 2015.

Leutwiler became the eighth summer signing to join newly-relegated Shrewsbury Town in League Two on a two-year deal on 11 June 2014, where new manager Micky Mellon was rebuilding the squad. He had been recommended to the club by former Middlesbrough goalkeeper and current Shrewsbury coach Danny Coyne. He started the season as first choice goalkeeper, keeping a clean sheet in each of the first three rounds of the League Cup, all against higher division opposition, to set up a fourth round tie with Chelsea at the New Meadow.

It was documented in February 2015 that Leutwiler had kept more clean sheets that season than any goalkeeper in Europe, 20 in 39 matches. Leutwiler broke the club record for most clean sheets in a league season, after keeping his 22nd clean sheet in a home match against York City, before clinching promotion to League One the following weekend with a 1–0 victory at Cheltenham Town on his 26th-birthday.

Leutwiler continued in his role as first-choice goalkeeper at Shrewsbury until a back injury ruled him out of a home match against Blackpool in September 2015, ending a run of 54 consecutive starts in the Football League, losing his place to Mark Halstead. He was immediately reinstated on his return to fitness. However, he suffered concussion and facial injuries in a televised FA Cup second-round match at Grimsby Town in December, which saw Halstead deputise for him once again. He returned to the side for an away match at Burton Albion, as Shrewsbury beat the league leaders 2–1.

With Shrewsbury avoiding relegation in their first season back in League One, Leutwiler signed a new contract in June 2016, keeping him at the club until the summer of 2018. He made 49 appearances in the 2016–17 campaign, but manager Paul Hurst said that Leutwiler was not in his first-team plans beyond the summer.

=== Blackburn Rovers ===
On 2 August 2017, Blackburn Rovers announced the signing of Leutwiler on a two-year deal for an undisclosed fee. He was second-choice to the Spaniard David Raya and did not make his debut until 4 November in the first round of the FA Cup against Barnet; Blackburn won 3–1 at home and local newspaper the Lancashire Telegraph wrote that he was "left exposed for the Barnet goal but in truth had a relatively trouble-free Rovers debut".

He played the remainder of their cup campaign, a win over Crewe Alexandra on a replay, then a 1–0 loss to Hull City at Ewood Park in the third round on 6 January 2018. Leutwiler's league debut for Rovers was his only such appearance of the League One promotion-winning season, a 1–0 loss at Charlton Athletic on 28 April. He played the final five matches of the 2018–19 Championship season as manager Tony Mowbray assessed whether to offer him a new contract. He was limited to three cup appearances in the 2019–20 campaign.

=== Fleetwood Town ===
Following an unsuccessful trial at Accrington Stanley, Leutwiler joined League One club Fleetwood Town on 11 September 2020, where #1 Joel Coleman had recently suffered a severe hamstring injury. He departed the club on 8 January 2021, following the expiration of his contract. He had conceded just 14 goals in 18 games, but left the club shortly after manager Joey Barton, who prior to his departure had offered to personally pay Leutwiler's £500-per-week wages for the cash-strapped club.

=== Huddersfield Town ===
On 1 February 2021, Leutwiler joined Championship side Huddersfield Town on a deal until the end of the 2020–21 season. He had impressed Carlos Corberán on trial, who needed cover for 21-year-old Ryan Schofield. He did not make a first-team appearance during his time at the Kirklees Stadium.

=== Oldham Athletic ===
On 22 June 2021, Leutwiler joined League Two side Oldham Athletic, signing a two-year deal; manager Keith Curle had needed to build a new goalkeeping team at Boundary Park after the club were reliant on loanees the previous season. A renegotiation of his contract was though necessary two months later due to "an unfortunate misinterpretation of the full terms of the monitored EFL loan". He was unable to establish himself in goal after John Sheridan replaced interim manager Selim Benachour in January 2022.

He played 29 matches in the 2021–22 season as Oldham were relegated out of the Football League. He did not feature at all in the National League as Magnus Norman was an ever-present. He instead featured twice in cup games in the 2022–23 campaign, earning praise from manager David Unsworth after being the victorious penalty shoot-out goalkeeper in an FA Trophy victory over Peterborough Sports.

=== Port Vale ===
On 29 June 2023, Port Vale announced that Leutwiler had signed a one-year contract with the club to start on 1 July. Manager Andy Crosby said that "we will be using his knowledge and personality to enhance our group", whilst director of football David Flitcroft noted that "we want drivers of standards and performance and that is one of Jayson's biggest attributes". He remained as back-up to undisputed number one Connor Ripley and featured only in four EFL Trophy games. He was not retained by new manager Darren Moore at the end of the 2023–24 season.

== International career ==
Leutwiler represented Switzerland up to under-20 level. In October 2016, the Canadian Soccer Association (CSA) confirmed that he would take part in a Canadian camp. He made his debut for Canada as a half-time substitute against South Korea on 11 November 2016.

His second cap came in a 1–1 draw in Scotland on 22 March 2017, where he was again a half-time substitute. He played the full ninety minutes of his third and final cap, a 2–0 win over Jamaica on 2 September.

Leutwiler was named to Canada's 2017 CONCACAF Gold Cup by Octavio Zambrano, and to the 2019 and 2021 CONCACAF Gold Cup squads by John Herdman.

== Style of play ==
Leutwiller is an all-round goalkeeper who is able to command his penalty area and collect crosses.

== Career statistics ==
=== Club statistics ===
Appearances and goals by club, season and competition
Club	Season	League			National cup (Note: Includes Swiss Cup, FA Cup)		League cup (Note: Includes Football League Cup)		Other		Total	
Club	Season	Division	Apps	Goals	Apps	Goals	Apps	Goals	Apps	Goals	Apps	Goals
Yverdon Sport (loan)	2009–10	Swiss Challenge League	30	0	0	0	—		0	0	30	0
Wohlen (loan)	2010–11	Swiss Challenge League	15	0	1	0	—		0	0	16	0
Schaffhausen (loan)	2011–12	Swiss 1. Liga	14	0	—		—		—		14	0
Middlesbrough	2012–13	Championship	0	0	0	0	1	0	—		1	0
Middlesbrough	2013–14	Championship	3	0	0	0	1	0	—		4	0
Middlesbrough	Total		3	0	0	0	2	0	0	0	5	0
Shrewsbury Town	2014–15	League Two	46	0	3	0	4	0	1 (Note: Appearance(s) in Football League Trophy / EFL Trophy)	0	54	0
Shrewsbury Town	2015–16	League One	29	0	4	0	2	0	2	0	37	0
Shrewsbury Town	2016–17	League One	43	0	3	0	2	0	1	0	49	0
Shrewsbury Town	Total		118	0	10	0	8	0	4	0	140	0
Blackburn Rovers	2017–18	League One	1	0	4	0	0	0	0	0	5	0
Blackburn Rovers	2018–19	Championship	5	0	0	0	0	0	—		5	0
Blackburn Rovers	2019–20	Championship	0	0	1	0	2	0	—		3	0
Blackburn Rovers	Total		6	0	5	0	2	0	0	0	13	0
Fleetwood Town	2020–21	League One	16	0	1	0	0	0	1	0	18	0
Huddersfield Town	2020–21	Championship	0	0	—		—		—		0	0
Oldham Athletic	2021–22	League Two	22	0	2	0	1	0	4	0	29	0
Oldham Athletic	2022–23	National League	0	0	1	0	—		1 (Note: Appearance(s) in FA Trophy)	0	2	0
Oldham Athletic	Total		22	0	3	0	1	0	5	0	31	0
Port Vale	2023–24	League One	0	0	0	0	0	0	4	0	4	0
Career total			224	0	20	0	13	0	14	0	271	0

=== International statistics ===
Canada national team
Year	Apps	Goals
2016	1	0
2017	2	0
Total	3	0

== Honours ==
FC Basel

- Swiss champion at U-18 level: 2005–06
- Swiss Cup at U-19/U-18 level: 2005–06
- Swiss champion at U-21 level: 2007–08, 2008–09
- Swiss Super League: 2007–08

Shrewsbury Town

- Football League Two second-place promotion: 2014–15

Blackburn Rovers

- EFL League One second-place promotion: 2017–18

== Sources ==
- Josef Zindel (2018). FC Basel 1893. Die ersten 125 Jahre (in German). Basel: Friedrich Reinhardt Verlag. ISBN 978-3-7245-2305-5.
- Rotblau: Jahrbuch Saison 2014/2015. Publisher: FC Basel Marketing AG. ISBN 978-3-7245-2027-6
