= 2009–10 Swiss Challenge League =

Swiss Challenge League
- Season: 2009–10
- Promoted: Thun
- Relegated: Le Mont, Gossau
- Europa League: Vaduz, Lausanne-Sport
- Matches played: 215
- Goals scored: 669 (3.11 per match)
- Top goalscorer: Pape Omar Faye (12); Nick Proschwitz (12)
- Biggest home win: Thun 9–0 Nyonnais (29 August 2009)
- Biggest away win: Lausanne 0–5 Lugano (25 July 2009); Nyonnais 2–7 Winterthur (15 August 2009); Schaffhausen 0–5 Lugano (22 August 2009)
- Highest scoring: Nyonnais 2–7 Winterthur (15 August 2009); Thun 9–0 Nyonnais (29 August 2009)

The 2009–10 Swiss Challenge League was the seventh season of the Swiss Challenge League, the second tier of the Swiss football league pyramid. It began on 24 July 2009 and ended on 15 May 2010. The champions of this season, FC Thun, earned promotion to the 2010–11 Super League. The bottom two teams, FC Le Mont and FC Gossau, were relegated to the 1. Liga.

== Teams ==
Club	City	Stadium	2008–09 season
FC Biel/Bienne	Biel/Bienne, Bern	Gurzelen Stadium	5th in Challenge League
FC Gossau	Gossau, St. Gallen	Sportanlage Buechenwald	16th in Challenge League
FC Lausanne-Sport	Lausanne, Vaud	Stade Olympique de la Pontaise	7th in Challenge League
FC Le Mont	Lausanne, Vaud	Terrain du Châtaignier	1. Liga play-offs round finalists
FC Locarno	Locarno, Ticino	Stadio comunale Lido	15th in Challenge League
FC Lugano	Lugano, Ticino	Stadio comunale Cornaredo	2nd in Challenge League
SC Kriens	Kriens, Lucerne	Stadion Kleinfeld	1. Liga play-offs round finalists
FC Schaffhausen	Schaffhausen	Stadion Breite	11h in Challenge League
Servette FC	Geneva	Stade de Genève	13th in Challenge League
FC Stade Nyonnais	Nyon, Vaud	Colovray	14th in Challenge League
FC Thun	Thun, Bern	Stadion Lachen	9th in Challenge League
FC Vaduz	Vaduz, Liechtenstein	Rheinpark Stadion	10th in Super League
FC Wil 1900	Wil, St. Gallen	Bergholz Stadium	3rd in Challenge League
FC Winterthur	Winterthur, Zürich	Schützenwiese	10th in Challenge League
FC Wohlen	Wohlen, Aargau	Stadion Niedermatten	6th in Challenge League
FC Yverdon-Sport	Yverdon-les-Bains, Vaud	Stade Municipal	4th in Challenge League

== League table ==
Pos	Team	Pld	W	D	L	GF	GA	GD	Pts	Promotion or relegation
1	Thun (C, P)	30	18	6	6	70	36	+34	60	Promotion to 2010–11 Swiss Super League
2	Lugano	30	17	8	5	65	29	+36	59	Qualification for Promotion play-off
3	Winterthur	30	16	8	6	69	46	+23	56	
4	Servette	30	14	10	6	49	37	+12	52	
5	Kriens	30	12	10	8	50	41	+9	46	
6	Wil	30	11	12	7	44	37	+7	45	
7	Biel-Bienne	30	10	12	8	54	39	+15	42	
8	Vaduz	30	11	8	11	44	43	+1	41	Qualification for Europa League second qualifying round (Note: Vaduz qualified for the 2010–11 UEFA Europa League 2nd qualifying round as they won the 2009–10 Liechtenstein Cup)
9	Yverdon-Sport	30	10	9	11	50	38	+12	39	
10	Lausanne-Sport	30	9	12	9	40	43	−3	39	Qualification for Europa League second qualifying round (Note: Lausanne-Sport have qualified for the 2010–11 UEFA Europa League 2nd qualifying round as they lost the 2009–10 Swiss Cup final against Champions League-qualified Basel.)
11	Schaffhausen	30	10	9	11	42	51	−9	39	
12	Wohlen	30	8	7	15	44	55	−11	31	
13	Locarno	30	7	10	13	46	65	−19	31	
14	Stade Nyonnais	30	8	7	15	36	64	−28	31	
15	Le Mont (R)	30	8	3	19	30	56	−26	27	Relegation to 2010–11 Swiss 1. Liga
16	Gossau (R)	30	2	7	21	27	80	−53	13	Relegation to 2010–11 Swiss 1. Liga

Source: football.ch (in German)
Rules for classification: 1) points; 2) goal difference; 3) number of goals scored.
(C) Champions; (P) Promoted; (R) Relegated

== Promotion/relegation play-offs ==
AC Bellinzona as 9th-placed team of the 2009–10 Super League played a two-legged play-off against Challenge League runners-up AC Lugano for a spot in the 2010–11 Super League.

21 May 2010
20:15 CEST

Bellinzona	2–1	Lugano
Mihoubi 27'; Feltscher 90+1'	Report (in Italian)	Montandon 70'; Preisig (red card) 78'

Stadio Comunale Bellinzona, Bellinzona
Attendance: 5,400
Referee: Jérôme Laperrière

24 May 2010
16:00 CEST

Lugano	0–0	Bellinzona
	Report (in Italian)

Cornaredo Stadium, Lugano
Attendance: 6,500
Referee: Claudio Circhetta

Bellinzona won 2–1 on aggregate and remain in the Swiss Super League. Lugano remain in the Swiss Challenge League.

== Top goal scorers ==
23 goals

- (Germany) Nick Proschwitz (Vaduz)

20 goals

- (Argentina) Dante Adrian Senger (Locarno)

17 goals

- (Nigeria) Innocent Emeghara (Winterthur)

16 goals

- (Argentina) Ezequiel Scarione (Thun)

14 goals

- (Switzerland) Carlos Da Silva (Lugano)
