= 2007–08 in Swiss football =

Football in Switzerland
- Season: 2007–08

Men's football
- Super League: Basel
- Challenge League: Vaduz
- 1. Liga: Group 1: Stade Nyonnais; Group 2: Basel U-21; Group 3: Baden; 1. Liga champions Stade Nyonnais
- Swiss Cup: Basel

Women's football
- Women's Super League: FFC Zürich Seebach

The following is a summary of the 2007–08 season of competitive football in Switzerland.

- Statistics of the Swiss Super League for the 2007–08 football season.
- Statistics of the Swiss Challenge League for the 2007–08 football season.
- Statistics of the Swiss 1. Liga for the 2007–08 football season.
- Statistics of the 2. Liga Interregional for the 2007–08 football season.
- Statistics of the Swiss Cup for the 2007–08 football season.

== Super League ==
Pos	Team	Pld	W	D	L	GF	GA	GD	Pts	Qualification or relegation
1	Basel (C)	36	22	8	6	73	39	+34	74	Qualification to Champions League second qualifying round
2	Young Boys	36	21	7	8	82	49	+33	70	Qualification to UEFA Cup second qualifying round
3	Zürich	36	15	11	10	58	43	+15	56	Qualification to UEFA Cup second qualifying round
4	Grasshopper	36	15	9	12	57	49	+8	54	Qualification to Intertoto Cup second round
5	Aarau	36	11	14	11	47	48	−1	47	
6	Luzern	36	10	14	12	40	49	−9	44	
7	Sion	36	11	10	15	48	51	−3	43	
8	Neuchâtel Xamax	36	10	11	15	48	55	−7	41	
9	St. Gallen (R)	36	9	7	20	39	69	−30	34	Qualification to relegation play-off
10	Thun (R)	36	6	9	21	30	70	−40	27	Relegation to Swiss Challenge League

Source: RSSSF
Rules for classification: 1) points; 2) goal difference; 3) number of goals scored.
(C) Champions; (R) Relegated

== Challenge League ==
Pos	Team	Pld	W	D	L	GF	GA	GD	Pts	Promotion or relegation
1	Vaduz (C, P)	34	21	7	6	75	40	+35	70	Promotion to 2008–09 Swiss Super League
2	Bellinzona (P)	34	21	6	7	74	39	+35	69	Qualification for Promotion play-off and UEFA Cup first qualifying round (Note: Since Swiss Cup winners, Basel, qualified for the Champions League, their UEFA Cup berth was given to finalists Bellinzona.)
3	Wil	34	20	8	6	63	35	+28	68	
4	Wohlen	34	16	8	10	65	46	+19	56	
5	Winterthur	34	14	9	11	59	56	+3	51	
6	Schaffhausen	34	13	10	11	53	40	+13	49	
7	Concordia Basel	34	13	10	11	55	54	+1	49	
8	Servette	34	12	10	12	55	46	+9	46	
9	Lugano	34	12	10	12	61	63	−2	46	
10	Yverdon-Sport	34	10	13	11	39	35	+4	43	
11	Gossau	34	11	10	13	50	54	−4	43	
12	Chaux-de-Fonds	34	12	7	15	53	63	−10	43	
13	Lausanne-Sport	34	11	9	14	46	47	−1	42	
14	Locarno	34	12	5	17	37	61	−24	41	
15	Kriens (R)	34	8	14	12	43	54	−11	38	Relegation to 2008–09 Swiss 1. Liga
16	Delémont (R)	34	10	7	17	42	58	−16	37	Relegation to 2008–09 Swiss 1. Liga
17	Chiasso (R)	34	8	9	17	43	68	−25	33	Relegation to 2008–09 Swiss 1. Liga
18	Cham (R)	34	4	4	26	31	85	−54	16	Relegation to 2008–09 Swiss 1. Liga

Rules for classification: 1) points; 2) goal difference; 3) number of goals scored.
(C) Champions; (P) Promoted; (R) Relegated

=== Promotion/relegation play-offs ===
FC St. Gallen as 9th-placed team of the Super League were played a two-legged play-off against Challenge League runners-up AC Bellinzona.

17 May 2008
17:45 CEST

Bellinzona	3–2	St. Gallen
Pouga 4'; Taljević 61'; Lulić 89'		Ural 71'; Gelabert 76'

Stadio Comunale, Bellinzona
Attendance: 7,000
Referee: René Rogalla

20 May 2008
19:45 CEST

St. Gallen	0–2	Bellinzona
		Neri 36'; Lulić 90+2'

Espenmoos, St. Gallen
Attendance: 11,300
Referee: Jérôme Laperrière

Bellinzona won 5–2 on aggregate and are promoted to 2008–09 Super League. St. Gallen are relegated to the 2008–09 Challenge League.

== 1. Liga ==
=== Group 1 ===
Pos	Team	Pld	W	D	L	GF	GA	GD	Pts	Qualification or relegation
1	FC Stade Nyonnais	32	23	6	3	65	26	+39	75	Play-off to Challenge League
2	FC Baulmes	32	19	9	4	70	27	+43	66	Did not apply for licence
3	Urania Genève Sport	32	17	7	8	57	45	+12	58	Play-off to Challenge League
4	Étoile Carouge FC	32	16	7	9	69	39	+30	55	Play-off to Challenge League
5	FC Bulle	32	14	6	12	66	56	+10	48	
6	FC Echallens	32	12	9	11	41	35	+6	45	
7	ES FC Malley	32	11	11	10	55	46	+9	44	
8	FC Fribourg	32	12	8	12	58	53	+5	44	
9	Sion U-21	32	11	8	13	49	50	−1	41	
10	SC Düdingen	32	12	5	15	43	52	−9	41	
11	FC Meyrin	32	10	10	12	39	47	−8	40	
12	FC Naters	32	10	10	12	37	47	−10	40	
13	FC Martigny-Sports	32	11	6	15	42	59	−17	39	
14	FC La Tour/Le Pâquier	32	11	5	16	44	54	−10	38	
15	FC Serrières	32	7	13	12	40	57	−17	34	Relegation to 2. Liga Interregional
16	FC Bex	32	8	7	17	40	58	−18	31	Relegation to 2. Liga Interregional
17	FC Savièse	32	3	3	26	34	98	−64	12	Relegation to 2. Liga Interregional

Source: Erste Liga official website
Rules for classification: 1) Points; 2) Goal difference within the league, or play-off for qualifiers.

=== Group 2 ===
Pos	Team	Pld	W	D	L	GF	GA	GD	Pts	Qualification or relegation
1	Basel U-21	30	20	5	5	70	32	+38	65	Not eligible to Play-offs
2	FC Biel-Bienne	30	17	7	6	49	17	+32	58	Play-off to Challenge League
3	FC Münsingen	30	15	9	6	42	31	+11	54	Play-off to Challenge League
4	Young Boys U-21	30	14	7	9	74	43	+31	49	
5	FC Schötz	30	13	10	7	58	40	+18	49	
6	FC Solothurn	30	12	3	15	58	57	+1	39	
7	FC Wangen bei Olten	30	9	11	10	43	57	−14	38	
8	Luzern U-21	30	9	9	12	47	48	−1	36	
9	FC Olten	30	9	9	12	51	62	−11	36	
10	FC Grenchen	30	9	8	13	37	46	−9	35	
11	BSC Old Boys	30	9	8	13	43	53	−10	35	
12	Zug 94	30	9	8	13	51	66	−15	35	
13	SV Muttenz	30	8	10	12	42	54	−12	34	
14	SC Zofingen	30	8	9	13	49	75	−26	33	Relegation play-out
15	SV Lyss	30	8	8	14	50	57	−7	32	Relegation to 2. Liga Interregional
16	FC Laufen	30	7	7	16	35	61	−26	28	Relegation to 2. Liga Interregional

Source: Erste Liga official website
Rules for classification: 1) Points; 2) Goal difference within the league, or play-off for qualifiers.

=== Group 3 ===
Pos	Team	Pld	W	D	L	GF	GA	GD	Pts	Qualification or relegation
1	FC Baden	30	19	6	5	56	31	+25	63	Play-off to Challenge League
2	GC Biaschesi	30	18	7	5	62	31	+31	61	Play-off to Challenge League
3	FC Rapperswil-Jona	30	16	8	6	63	34	+29	56	Play-off to Challenge League
4	FC Schaffhausen	30	16	8	6	67	45	+22	56	
5	Grasshopper Club U-21	30	15	8	7	67	44	+23	53	
6	FC Tuggen	30	14	8	8	55	37	+18	50	
7	FC Red Star Zürich	30	13	6	11	44	40	+4	45	
8	Winterthur U-21	30	11	6	13	55	50	+5	39	
9	Zürich U-21	30	11	6	13	59	55	+4	39	
10	FC Mendrisio-Stabio	30	9	12	9	41	42	−1	39	
11	St. Gallen U-21	30	11	5	14	52	53	−1	38	
12	SC YF Juventus	30	8	9	13	43	57	−14	33	
13	FC Kreuzlingen	30	7	7	16	31	53	−22	28	
14	FC Brugg	30	6	5	19	34	68	−34	23	Relegation play-out
15	FC Küsnacht	30	5	6	19	37	85	−48	21	Relegation to 2. Liga Interregional
16	FC Herisau	30	5	5	20	29	70	−41	20	Relegation to 2. Liga Interregional

Source: Erste Liga official website
Rules for classification: 1) Points; 2) Goal difference within the league, or play-off for qualifiers.

=== Play-off to Challenge League ===
==== 1st round ====
Team 1	Score	Team 2
Münsingen	0 - 1	Biaschesi
Biaschesi	1 - 1	Münsingen
Etoile Carouge	0 - 2	Baden
Baden	0 - 0	Etoile Carouge
Urania Genève Sport	1 - 1	FC Biel-Bienne
FC Biel-Bienne	2 - 1	Urania Genève Sport
Rapperswil-Jona	4 - 3	Stade Nyonnais
Stade Nyonnais	2 - 1	Rapperswil-Jona

==== Final round ====
Team 1	Score	Team 2
FC Biel-Bienne	0 - 0	Baden
Baden	1 - 1	FC Biel-Bienne
Stade Nyonnais	1 - 0	Biaschesi
Biaschesi	2 - 5	Stade Nyonnais

Stade Nyonnais (declared champion) and Biel-Bienne are promoted to 2008–09 Challenge League.

=== Relegation play-out ===
Team 1	Score	Team 2
Zofingen	2 - 1	FC Brugg

Zofingen win and remain in division for next season. FC Brugg are relegated.

== Swiss Cup final ==
6 April 2008
15:45

AC Bellinzona	1 – 4	FC Basel
Belotti (yellow card) 20'; Pouga 58'	FCB Summary	Derdiyok 30'; Majstorović 62'; Streller 64'; Huggel 66'

St. Jakob-Park, Basel
Attendance: 33,000
Referee: (Switzerland) Cyril Zimmermann (Münsingen)

GK	(Italy) Lorenzo Bucchi
DF	(Italy) Davide Belotti	(yellow card) 20'	(substituted off) 46'
DF	(Switzerland) Alessandro Mangiarratti
DF	(Italy) Paolo Carbone
MF	(Italy) Giuseppe Miccolis		(substituted off) 69'
MF	(Peru) Manuel Rivera Garrido		(substituted off) 73'
MF	(Italy) Jacopo La Rocca
MF	(Bosnia and Herzegovina) Senad Lulić
MF	(Germany) Ifet Taljević
ST	(Brazil) Neri
ST	(Cameroon) Christian Pouga
Substitutes:
DF	(Italy) Ludovico Moresi		(substituted on) 46'
MF	(Italy) Angelo Raso		(substituted on) 69'
FW	(Switzerland) Andrea Conti		(substituted on) 73'
Manager:
(Switzerland) Vladimir Petković

GK	(Argentina) Franco Costanzo
DF	(Switzerland) Reto Zanni
DF	(Sweden) Daniel Majstorović
DF	(France) François Marque
DF	(Japan) Kōji Nakata
MF	(Cameroon) Papa Malick Ba
MF	(Switzerland) Eren Derdiyok	(substituted off) 46'
MF	(Switzerland) Benjamin Huggel
MF	(Serbia) Ivan Ergić
MF	(Portugal) Carlitos	(substituted off) 55'
ST	(Brazil) Eduardo	(substituted off) 76'
Substitutes:
MF	(Switzerland) Marco Streller	(substituted on) 46'
MF	(Switzerland) David Degen	(substituted on) 55'
MF	(Serbia) Marko Perović	(substituted on) 76'
Manager:
(Switzerland) Christian Gross

== Sources ==
- Switzerland 2007–08 at RSSSF
- Season 2007–08 at the official website
- "Worldfootball.net". Soccerway.
- Josef Zindel (2018). FC Basel 1893. Die ersten 125 Jahre (in German). Basel: Friedrich Reinhardt Verlag. ISBN 978-3-7245-2305-5.

Preceded by 2006–07	Seasons in Swiss football	Succeeded by 2008–09
