= 2008–09 in Swiss football =

Football in Switzerland
- Season: 2008–09

Men's football
- Super League: Zürich
- Challenge League: St. Gallen
- 1. Liga: Group 1: Étoile Carouge; Group 2: Basel U-21; Group 3: Chiasso; 1. Liga champions Kriens
- Swiss Cup: Sion

Women's football
- Swiss Women's Super League: FC Zürich Frauen

The following is a summary of the 2009–10 season of competitive football in Switzerland.

- Statistics of the Swiss Super League for the 2008–09 football season.
- Statistics of the Swiss Challenge League for the 2008–09 football season.
- Statistics of the Swiss 1. Liga for the 2008–09 football season.
- Statistics of the 2. Liga Interregional for the 2008–09 football season.
- Statistics of the Swiss Cup for the 2008–09 football season.

== Super League ==
Pos	Team	Pld	W	D	L	GF	GA	GD	Pts	Qualification or relegation
1	Zürich (C)	36	24	7	5	80	36	+44	79	Qualification to Champions League third qualifying round
2	Young Boys	36	22	7	7	85	46	+39	73	Qualification to Europa League third qualifying round
3	Basel	36	22	6	8	72	44	+28	72	Qualification to Europa League second qualifying round
4	Grasshopper	36	12	14	10	57	48	+9	50	
5	Aarau	36	11	11	14	35	51	−16	44	
6	Bellinzona	36	11	10	15	44	51	−7	43	
7	Neuchâtel Xamax	36	10	10	16	50	57	−7	40	
8	Sion	36	9	10	17	44	60	−16	37	Qualification to Europa League play-off round (Note: Sion won the 2008–09 Swiss Cup and thereby qualified for the play-off round of the UEFA Europa League.)
9	Luzern (O)	36	9	8	19	45	62	−17	35	Qualification to relegation play-off
10	Vaduz (R)	36	5	7	24	28	85	−57	22	Relegation to Swiss Challenge League (Note: Being a Liechtenstein club, Vaduz are not eligible for qualification to European competitions via the Swiss league system. They did, however, qualify for the second qualifying round of the UEFA Europa League by winning their domestic 2008–09 Liechtenstein Cup.)

Source: axposuperleague.ch (in German)
Rules for classification: 1) points; 2) goal difference; 3) number of goals scored.
(C) Champions; (O) Play-off winners; (R) Relegated

== Challenge League ==
Pos	Team	Pld	W	D	L	GF	GA	GD	Pts	Promotion or relegation
1	St. Gallen (C, P)	30	25	3	2	78	22	+56	78	Promotion to 2009–10 Swiss Super League
2	Lugano	30	22	4	4	72	30	+42	70	Qualification for Promotion play-off
3	Wil	30	14	9	7	41	25	+16	51	
4	Yverdon-Sport	30	14	9	7	52	41	+11	51	
5	Biel-Bienne	30	14	5	11	58	53	+5	47	
6	Wohlen	30	13	6	11	43	47	−4	45	
7	Lausanne-Sport	30	11	8	11	41	43	−2	41	
8	Concordia Basel (R)	30	11	7	12	48	51	−3	40	Relegation to 2009–10 Swiss 1. Liga
9	Thun	30	11	5	14	54	65	−11	38	
10	Winterthur	30	9	9	12	46	46	0	36	
11	Schaffhausen	30	8	10	12	40	45	−5	34	
12	La Chaux-de-Fonds (R)	30	9	6	15	39	46	−7	33	Relegation to 2009–10 Swiss 1. Liga
13	Servette	30	7	10	13	31	46	−15	31	
14	Stade Nyonnais	30	8	4	18	26	56	−30	28	
15	Locarno	30	7	5	18	46	57	−11	26	
16	Gossau	30	5	4	21	27	69	−42	19	

Source: Football.ch
Rules for classification: 1) points; 2) goal difference; 3) number of goals scored.
(C) Champions; (P) Promoted; (R) Relegated

== 1. Liga ==
=== Group 1 ===
Pos	Team	Pld	W	D	L	GF	GA	GD	Pts	Qualification or relegation
1	Étoile Carouge FC	30	20	6	4	71	34	+37	66	Play-off to Challenge League
2	FC Le Mont	30	20	2	8	72	45	+27	62	Play-off to Challenge League
3	ES FC Malley	30	18	6	6	80	39	+41	60	Play-off to Challenge League
4	FC Fribourg	30	16	8	6	56	34	+22	56	
5	FC Meyrin	30	15	5	10	61	51	+10	50	
6	FC Bulle	30	14	6	10	53	50	+3	48	
7	CS Chênois	30	12	6	12	54	42	+12	42	
8	Young Boys U-21	30	10	6	14	51	56	−5	36	
9	FC Echallens	30	9	9	12	39	46	−7	36	
10	FC Naters	30	10	5	15	43	48	−5	35	
11	FC Baulmes	30	9	7	14	49	69	−20	34	
12	FC Martigny-Sports	30	9	7	14	41	62	−21	34	
13	Sion U-21	30	9	6	15	46	58	−12	33	
14	Urania Genève Sport	30	8	9	13	50	64	−14	33	
15	SC Düdingen	30	6	9	15	32	53	−21	27	Relegation to 2. Liga Interregional
16	FC La Tour/Le Pâquier	30	4	5	21	32	79	−47	17	Relegation to 2. Liga Interregional

Source: Erste Liga official website
Rules for classification: 1) Points; 2) Goal difference within the league, or play-off for qualifiers.

=== Group 2 ===
Pos	Team	Pld	W	D	L	GF	GA	GD	Pts	Qualification or relegation
1	Basel U-21	30	24	4	2	98	38	+60	76	
2	SC Kriens	30	20	8	2	69	32	+37	68	Play-off to Challenge League
3	FC Schötz	30	17	5	8	66	50	+16	56	Play-off to Challenge League
4	FC Emmenbrücke	30	11	10	9	44	48	−4	43	
5	Luzern U-21	30	12	6	12	64	56	+8	42	
6	BSC Old Boys	30	11	9	10	50	45	+5	42	
7	SC Cham	30	11	9	10	57	53	+4	42	
8	FC Grenchen	30	12	5	13	43	50	−7	41	
9	FC Solothurn	30	12	4	14	59	52	+7	40	
10	SR Delémont	30	11	6	13	59	48	+11	39	
11	Zug 94	30	11	5	14	55	65	−10	38	
12	FC Münsingen	30	8	8	14	38	45	−7	32	
13	SC Zofingen	30	10	2	18	46	75	−29	32	
14	FC Wangen bei Olten	30	9	5	16	43	74	−31	32	
15	SV Muttenz	30	7	5	18	42	66	−24	26	Relegation to 2. Liga Interregional
16	FC Olten	30	6	5	19	31	67	−36	23	Relegation to 2. Liga Interregional

Source: Erste Liga official website
Rules for classification: 1) Points; 2) Goal difference within the league, or play-off for qualifiers.

=== Group 3 ===
Pos	Team	Pld	W	D	L	GF	GA	GD	Pts	Qualification or relegation
1	FC Chiasso	30	20	8	2	69	28	+41	68	Play-off to Challenge League
2	FC Tuggen	30	19	5	6	70	35	+35	62	Play-off to Challenge League
3	FC Rapperswil-Jona	30	17	10	3	63	35	+28	61	Play-off to Challenge League
4	Zürich U-21	30	15	9	6	63	41	+22	54	
5	USV Eschen/Mauren	30	15	7	8	47	36	+11	52	
6	SV Höngg	30	12	8	10	44	45	−1	44	
7	FC Baden	30	13	4	13	51	44	+7	43	
8	SC YF Juventus	30	12	6	12	53	43	+10	42	
9	Grasshopper Club U-21	29	11	7	11	53	56	−3	40	
10	St. Gallen U-21	29	9	8	12	51	60	−9	35	
11	Winterthur U-21	30	10	4	16	47	51	−4	34	
12	FC Schaffhausen	30	9	7	14	40	46	−6	34	
13	GC Biaschesi	30	9	4	17	37	62	−25	31	
14	FC Mendrisio	30	7	9	14	31	52	−21	30	
15	FC Kreuzlingen	30	5	5	20	35	82	−47	20	Relegation to 2. Liga Interregional
16	FC Red Star Zürich	30	2	7	21	28	66	−38	13	Relegation to 2. Liga Interregional

Source: Erste Liga official website
Rules for classification: 1) Points; 2) Goal difference within the league, or play-off for qualifiers.

=== Play-off to Challenge League ===
==== Qualification round ====
	Results
Malley	2 - 3	Chiasso
Chiasso	3 - 2	Malley
Rapperswil	1 - 2	Kriens
Kriens	3 - 2	Rapperswil
Schötz	1 - 0	Etoile Carouge
Etoile Carouge	1 - 2	Schötz
Le Mont	4 - 1	Tuggen
Tuggen	0 - 0	Le Mont

==== Final round ====
	Results
Chiasso	2 - 0	Le Mont
Le Mont	3 - 0	Chiasso
Kriens	3 - 1	Schötz
Schötz	1 - 3	Kriens

== 2. Liga Interregional ==
=== Group 1 ===
Pos	Team	Pld	W	D	L	GF	GA	GD	Pts	Promotion or relegation
1	FC Grand-Lancy	26	16	5	5	47	24	+23	53	Promotion to 1. Liga
2	FC Montreux-Sports	26	16	4	6	61	38	+23	52	
3	US Terre Sainte	26	13	7	6	53	27	+26	46	
4	Signal FC Bernex-Confignon	26	13	7	6	50	29	+21	46	
5	Racing Club Genève	26	13	4	9	59	58	+1	43	
6	FC Stade-Lausanne-Ouchy	26	12	6	8	51	37	+14	42	
7	Neuchâtel Xamax U-21	26	11	8	7	60	33	+27	41	
8	FC Monthey	26	11	6	9	39	34	+5	39	
9	FC Bex	26	11	4	11	49	49	0	37	
10	FC Perly-Certoux	26	9	7	10	36	39	−3	34	
11	FC Massongex	26	8	6	12	41	60	−19	30	
12	FC Raron	26	5	6	15	33	63	−30	21	Relegation to 2. Liga
13	FC Plan-les-Ouates	26	3	7	16	38	68	−30	16	Relegation to 2. Liga
14	FC Savièse	26	0	5	21	15	73	−58	5	Relegation to 2. Liga

Rules for classification: 1) Points; 2) Goal difference within the league, or play-off for qualifiers.

=== Group 2 ===
Pos	Team	Pld	W	D	L	GF	GA	GD	Pts	Promotion or relegation
1	FC Breitenrain	26	20	3	3	55	17	+38	63	Promotion to 1. Liga
2	FC Bavois	26	19	5	2	59	29	+30	62	Promotion to 1. Liga
3	FC Serrières	26	19	2	5	55	21	+34	59	
4	FC Thun U-21	26	13	5	8	75	47	+28	44	
5	FC Bern	26	10	7	9	32	36	−4	37	
6	SV Lyss	26	10	4	12	38	42	−4	34	
7	SC Bümpliz 78	26	10	0	16	44	57	−13	30	
8	FC Dürrenast	26	7	8	11	37	40	−3	29	
9	FC Colombier	26	8	4	14	36	46	−10	28	
10	ES Belfaux	26	8	4	14	38	58	−20	28	
11	CS Romontois	26	7	5	14	32	45	−13	26	
12	FC Portalban/Gletterens	26	7	5	14	23	55	−32	26	Relegation to 2. Liga
13	FC Gumefens/Sorens	26	6	7	13	26	40	−14	25	Relegation to 2. Liga
14	FC Cortaillod	26	4	9	13	36	53	−17	21	Relegation to 2. Liga

Rules for classification: 1) Points; 2) Goal difference within the league, or play-off for qualifiers.

=== Group 3 ===
Pos	Team	Pld	W	D	L	GF	GA	GD	Pts	Promotion or relegation
1	FC Lugano U-21	26	20	4	2	77	21	+56	64	Promotion to 1. Liga
2	FC Sursee	26	15	7	4	47	27	+20	52	
3	FC Aarau U-21	26	15	6	5	64	32	+32	51	
4	FC Sarnen	26	15	4	7	59	44	+15	49	
5	AC Malcantone	26	13	6	7	51	41	+10	45	
6	SC Buochs	26	11	10	5	45	23	+22	43	
7	FC Ibach	26	9	8	9	46	38	+8	35	
8	Losone Sportiva	26	9	7	10	53	50	+3	34	
9	SC Goldau	26	7	6	13	27	38	−11	27	
10	SC Schöftland	26	8	3	15	39	58	−19	27	
11	FC Kickers Luzern	26	7	5	14	38	55	−17	26	
12	FC Küssnacht a/R	26	7	4	15	38	57	−19	25	Relegation to 2. Liga
13	SAR Rivera	26	7	4	15	29	49	−20	25	Relegation to 2. Liga
14	FC Brugg	26	1	2	23	16	96	−80	5	Relegation to 2. Liga

Rules for classification: 1) Points; 2) Goal difference within the league, or play-off for qualifiers.

=== Group 4 ===
Pos	Team	Pld	W	D	L	GF	GA	GD	Pts	Promotion or relegation
1	FC Laufen	26	19	3	4	69	29	+40	60	Promotion to 1. Liga
2	SC Dornach	26	16	5	5	74	39	+35	53	
3	FC Alle	26	15	6	5	47	23	+24	51	
4	FC Herzogenbuchsee	26	13	4	9	38	35	+3	43	
5	FC Liestal	26	11	6	9	59	48	+11	39	
6	FC Küsnacht	26	10	6	10	41	51	−10	36	
7	FC Seefeld Zürich	26	10	5	11	46	39	+7	35	
8	FC Porrentruy	26	9	5	12	37	46	−9	32	
9	FC Langenthal	26	8	7	11	42	47	−5	31	
10	FC Bülach	26	8	5	13	36	44	−8	29	
11	FC Nordstern Basel	26	9	2	15	35	50	−15	29	
12	FC Moutier	26	7	7	12	44	60	−16	28	Relegation to 2. Liga
13	SC Binningen	26	7	6	13	29	50	−21	27	Relegation to 2. Liga
14	FC Subingen	26	3	7	16	29	65	−36	16	Relegation to 2. Liga

Rules for classification: 1) Points; 2) Goal difference within the league, or play-off for qualifiers.

=== Group 5 ===
Pos	Team	Pld	W	D	L	GF	GA	GD	Pts	Promotion or relegation
1	FC Chur 97	26	17	6	3	55	22	+33	57	Promotion to 1. Liga
2	SC Brühl	26	16	5	5	60	31	+29	53	
3	FC Freienbach	26	16	4	6	43	31	+12	52	
4	FC Töss	26	13	8	5	60	38	+22	47	
5	FC Thalwil	26	15	1	10	35	31	+4	46	
6	FC Balzers	26	13	3	10	47	43	+4	42	
7	FC Diepoldsau-Schmitter	26	11	7	8	38	34	+4	40	
8	FC Arbon	26	10	7	9	39	35	+4	37	
9	FC Bazenheid	26	8	8	10	35	31	+4	32	
10	FC Linth	26	7	5	14	37	51	−14	26	
11	FC Herisau	26	5	7	14	35	52	−17	22	
12	FC Frauenfeld	26	5	7	14	34	52	−18	22	Relegation to 2. Liga
13	FC Wädenswil	26	5	7	14	27	62	−35	22	Relegation to 2. Liga
14	FC Stäfa	26	3	1	22	29	61	−32	10	Relegation to 2. Liga

Rules for classification: 1) Points; 2) Goal difference within the league, or play-off for qualifiers.

== 2. Liga ==
Promotion to 2. Liga interregional:

- Aargauischer Fussballverband (AFV): FC Muri
- Fussballverband Bern / Jura (FVBJ): FC Lerchenfeld & FC Köniz
- Innerschweizerischer Fussballverband (IFV):FC Aegeri
- Fussballverband Nordwestschweiz (FVNWS): FC Black Stars
- Ostschweizer Fussballverband (OFV): FC Widnau & FC Amriswil
- Solothurner Kantonal-Fussballverband (SKFV): FC Härkingen
- Fussballverband Region Zürich (FVRZ): FC Zürich-Affoltern & FC Kosova
- Federazione ticinese di calcio (FTC): AC Sementina
- Freiburger Fussballverband (FFV): FC Kerzers
- Association cantonale genevoise de football (ACGF): FC Geneva
- Association neuchâteloise de football (ANF): Le Locle Sports
- Association valaisanne de football (AVF): FC Sierre
- Association cantonale vaudoise de football (ACVF): Lausanne-Sport U-21

== Swiss Cup final ==
20 May 2009
20:30 CEST

BSC Young Boys	2 – 3	FC Sion
Yapi Yapo 22' (pen.); Alioui 36' (o.g.)	SFV summary	Obradović 41'; Sarni 53'; Afonso 88'

Stade de Suisse, Bern
Attendance: 31,789
Referee: Claudio Circhetta

== Sources ==
- Switzerland 2008–09 at RSSSF

Preceded by 2007–08	Seasons in Swiss football	Succeeded by 2009–10
