= 2008–09 Swiss Challenge League =

The 2008–09 Swiss Challenge League was the sixth season of the Swiss Challenge League, the second tier of the Swiss football league pyramid. It began on 25 July 2008 and ended on 30 May 2009. The champions of this season, FC St. Gallen, earned promotion to the 2009–10 Super League. The two teams, FC Concordia Basel and FC La Chaux-de-Fonds, were administratively relegated to the 1. Liga due to the financial reasons.

== Teams ==
Club	City	Stadium	2007–08 season
FC Biel/Bienne	Biel/Bienne, Bern	Gurzelen Stadium	1. Liga play-offs round finalists
FC La Chaux-de-Fonds	La Chaux-de-Fonds, Neuchâtel	Centre Sportif de la Charrière	13th in Challenge League
FC Concordia Basel	Basel	Rankhof	7th in Challenge League
FC Gossau	Gossau, St. Gallen	Buechenwald	11th in Challenge League
FC Lausanne-Sport	Lausanne, Vaud	Stade Olympique de la Pontaise	13th in Challenge League
FC Locarno	Locarno, Ticino	Stadio comunale Lido	14th in Challenge League
AC Lugano	Lugano, Ticino	Stadio comunale Cornaredo	9th in Challenge League
FC St. Gallen	St. Gallen	Espenmoos	9th in Super League
FC Schaffhausen	Schaffhausen	Stadion Breite	6th in Challenge League
Servette FC	Geneva	Stade de Genève	8th in Challenge League
FC Stade Nyonnais	Nyon, Vaud	Colovray	1. Liga play-offs round finalists
FC Thun	Thun, Bern	Stadion Lachen	10th in Super League
FC Wil 1900	Wil, St. Gallen	Bergholz Stadium	3rd in Challenge League
FC Winterthur	Winterthur, Zürich	Schützenwiese	5th in Challenge League
FC Wohlen	Wohlen, Aargau	Niedermatten	4th in Challenge League
FC Yverdon-Sport	Yverdon-les-Bains, Vaud	Stade Municipal	10th in Challenge League

== League table ==
Pos	Team	Pld	W	D	L	GF	GA	GD	Pts	Promotion or relegation
1	St. Gallen (C, P)	30	25	3	2	78	22	+56	78	Promotion to 2009–10 Swiss Super League
2	Lugano	30	22	4	4	72	30	+42	70	Qualification for Promotion play-off
3	Wil	30	14	9	7	41	25	+16	51	
4	Yverdon-Sport	30	14	9	7	52	41	+11	51	
5	Biel-Bienne	30	14	5	11	58	53	+5	47	
6	Wohlen	30	13	6	11	43	47	−4	45	
7	Lausanne-Sport	30	11	8	11	41	43	−2	41	
8	Concordia Basel (R)	30	11	7	12	48	51	−3	40	Relegation to 2009–10 Swiss 1. Liga
9	Thun	30	11	5	14	54	65	−11	38	
10	Winterthur	30	9	9	12	46	46	0	36	
11	Schaffhausen	30	8	10	12	40	45	−5	34	
12	La Chaux-de-Fonds (R)	30	9	6	15	39	46	−7	33	Relegation to 2009–10 Swiss 1. Liga
13	Servette	30	7	10	13	31	46	−15	31	
14	Stade Nyonnais	30	8	4	18	26	56	−30	28	
15	Locarno	30	7	5	18	46	57	−11	26	
16	Gossau	30	5	4	21	27	69	−42	19	

Source: Football.ch
Rules for classification: 1) points; 2) goal difference; 3) number of goals scored.
(C) Champions; (P) Promoted; (R) Relegated

== Promotion/relegation play-offs ==
Luzern as 9th-placed team of the 2008–09 Swiss Super League played a two-legged play-off against Challenge League runners-up AC Lugano for a spot in the 2009–10 Super League.

10 June 2009
20:15 CEST

Lugano	1–0	Luzern
Renfer 15'

Cornaredo, Lugano
Attendance: 7,200
Referee: (Switzerland) Claudio Circhetta

13 June 2009
18:45 CEST

Luzern	5–0	Lugano
Renggli 14'; Chiumiento 52' (pen.); Paiva 77', 83'; Scarione 80'

Stadion Allmend, Lucerne
Attendance: 12,500
Referee: (Switzerland) Cyril Zimmermann

Luzern won 5–1 on aggregate and remained in the Swiss Super League. Lugano remained in the Swiss Challenge League

== Top goal scorers ==
24 goals

- (Italy) Vincenzo Rennella (Lugano)

22 goals

- (Switzerland) Moreno Merenda (St. Gallen)

17 goals

- (France) Franck Madou (Biel-Bienne)

15 goals

- (Switzerland) Rainer Bieli (Concordia)
- (France) Kamel Boughanem (Lausanne)

14 goals

- (Switzerland) Moreno Costanzo (St. Gallen)

13 goals

- (Argentina) Dante Senger (FC Locarno)

12 goals

- (Switzerland) David Blumer (Thun)
- (Democratic Republic of the Congo) Mbala Mbuta Biscotte (Yverdon-Sport)

11 goals

- (Switzerland) Allmir Ademi (Schaffhausen)
- (Croatia) Tomo Barlecaj (Winterthur)
- (Switzerland) Alain Schultz (Wohlen, until January)
- (Portugal) Bruno Valente (Lugano)

10 goals

- (Switzerland) Milaim Rama (Thun)
- (Brazil) Silvio Carlos (Wil)
- (Portugal) Carlos da Silva (Lugano)
