= 2007–08 Swiss Challenge League =

The 2007–08 Swiss Challenge League was the fifth season of the Swiss Challenge League, the second tier of the Swiss football league pyramid. It began on 20 July 2007 and ended on 12 May 2008. The champions of this season, FC Vaduz, earned promotion to the 2008–09 Super League. The runners-up AC Bellinzona won the promotion/relegation playoff against the 9th-placed team of the 2007–08 Super League, FC St. Gallen. The bottom four teams, SC Kriens, SR Delémont, FC Chiasso and SC Cham, were relegated to the 1. Liga.

== Teams ==
Club	City	Stadium	2006–07 season
AC Bellinzona	Bellinzona	Stadio comunale Bellinzona	2nd in Challenge League
SC Cham	Cham	Herti Allmend, Zug	1. Liga play-offs round finalists
FC La Chaux-de-Fonds	La Chaux-de-Fonds	Centre Sportif de la Charrière	10th in Challenge League
FC Chiasso	Chiasso	Stadio comunale Chiasso	4th in Challenge League
FC Concordia Basel	Basel	Stadion Rankhof	5th in Challenge League
SR Delémont	Delémont	La Blancherie	15th in Challenge League
FC Gossau	Gossau, St. Gallen	Sportanlage Buechenwald	1. Liga play-offs round finalists
SC Kriens	Kriens	Stadion Kleinfeld	3rd in Challenge League
FC Lausanne-Sport	Lausanne	Stade Olympique de la Pontaise	14th in Challenge League
FC Locarno	Locarno	Stadio comunale Lido	11th in Challenge League
AC Lugano	Lugano	Stadio comunale Cornaredo	13th in Challenge League
FC Schaffhausen	Schaffhausen	Stadion Breite	10th in Super League
Servette FC	Geneva	Stade de Genève	7th in Challenge League
FC Vaduz	Vaduz, Liechtenstein	Stadion Rheinpark	9th in Challenge League
FC Wil 1900	Wil	Bergholz Stadium	8th in Challenge League
FC Winterthur	Winterthur	Schützenwiese	6th in Challenge League
FC Wohlen	Wohlen, Aargau	Stadion Niedermatten	16th in Challenge League
FC Yverdon-Sport	Yverdon-les-Bains	Stade Municipal	12th in Challenge League

== League table ==
Pos	Team	Pld	W	D	L	GF	GA	GD	Pts	Promotion or relegation
1	Vaduz (C, P)	34	21	7	6	75	40	+35	70	Promotion to 2008–09 Swiss Super League
2	Bellinzona (P)	34	21	6	7	74	39	+35	69	Qualification for Promotion play-off and UEFA Cup first qualifying round (Note: Since Swiss Cup winners, Basel, qualified for the Champions League, their UEFA Cup berth was given to finalists Bellinzona.)
3	Wil	34	20	8	6	63	35	+28	68	
4	Wohlen	34	16	8	10	65	46	+19	56	
5	Winterthur	34	14	9	11	59	56	+3	51	
6	Schaffhausen	34	13	10	11	53	40	+13	49	
7	Concordia Basel	34	13	10	11	55	54	+1	49	
8	Servette	34	12	10	12	55	46	+9	46	
9	Lugano	34	12	10	12	61	63	−2	46	
10	Yverdon-Sport	34	10	13	11	39	35	+4	43	
11	Gossau	34	11	10	13	50	54	−4	43	
12	Chaux-de-Fonds	34	12	7	15	53	63	−10	43	
13	Lausanne-Sport	34	11	9	14	46	47	−1	42	
14	Locarno	34	12	5	17	37	61	−24	41	
15	Kriens (R)	34	8	14	12	43	54	−11	38	Relegation to 2008–09 Swiss 1. Liga
16	Delémont (R)	34	10	7	17	42	58	−16	37	Relegation to 2008–09 Swiss 1. Liga
17	Chiasso (R)	34	8	9	17	43	68	−25	33	Relegation to 2008–09 Swiss 1. Liga
18	Cham (R)	34	4	4	26	31	85	−54	16	Relegation to 2008–09 Swiss 1. Liga

Rules for classification: 1) points; 2) goal difference; 3) number of goals scored.
(C) Champions; (P) Promoted; (R) Relegated

== Promotion/relegation play-offs ==
FC St. Gallen as 9th-placed team in the 2007–08 Swiss Super League were played a two-legged play-off against Challenge League runners-up AC Bellinzona.

17 May 2008
17:45 CEST

Bellinzona	3–2	St. Gallen
Pouga 4'; Taljević 61'; Lulić 89'		Ural 71'; Gelabert 76'

Stadio Comunale, Bellinzona
Attendance: 7,000
Referee: René Rogalla

20 May 2008
19:45 CEST

St. Gallen	0–2	Bellinzona
		Neri 36'; Lulić 90+2'

Espenmoos, St. Gallen
Attendance: 11,300
Referee: Jérôme Laperrière

Bellinzona won 5–2 on aggregate and achieve promotion. St. Gallen are relegated to the Swiss Challenge League.

== Top goal scorers ==
Only players with at least 10 goals

Place	Scorer	Goals	Appearances	Team
1.	(Brazil) Gaspar	31	34	(Liechtenstein) Vaduz
2.	(Serbia) Samel Šabanović	25	34	Wil
3.	(Switzerland) Pascal Renfer	20	25	Lugano
3.	(Switzerland) Alain Schultz	20	30	Wohlen
5.	(Cameroon) Christian Pouga	18	32	Bellinzona
5.	(Switzerland) Safet Etemi	18	33	Gossau
7.	(Switzerland) Rainer Bieli	17	33	Concordia Basel
8.	(Zimbabwe) Newton Ben Katanha	16	26	Schaffhausen
8.	(Portugal) Bruno Valente	16	30	Chaux-de-Fonds
10.	(Switzerland) Önder Çengel	14	26	Winterthur
11.	(Brazil) Leandro Fonseca	13	30	Yverdon-Sport
12.	(Brazil) Silvio Carlos	11	16	Wil
13.	(Brazil) Neri	10	16	Bellinzona
13.	(Switzerland) Yane Bugnard	10	23	Lausanne-Sport
13.	(Liechtenstein) Benjamin Fischer	10	28	(Liechtenstein) Vaduz
13.	(Germany) Ifet Taljević	10	30	Bellinzona
13.	(Bosnia and Herzegovina) Senad Lulić	10	33	Bellinzona
