= 2009–10 Swiss 1. Liga =

1. Liga
- Season: 2009–10
- Champions: Group 1: Sion U-21; Group 2: YF Juventus; Group 3: Chiasso
- Promoted: Chiasso; Delémont
- Relegated: Group 1: FC Bavois; FC Bulle; Group 2: FC Schaffhausen; SV Höngg; Group 3: FC Emmenbrücke; FC Chur 97
- Matches: 3 times 240 plus 12 play-offs plus 1 play-out

The 2009–10 Swiss 1. Liga was the 78th season of this league and at this time the third tier of the Swiss football league system, the highest level of amateur football.

== Format ==
The 1. Liga in the 2010–11 season was divided into three regional groups, each with 16 teams. Within each group, the teams would play a double round-robin to decide their positions in the league. The three groups winners and three runners-up, together with the two best third placed teams, then contested a play-off for the two promotion slots. The last placed two teams in each group would be relegated.

== Group 1 ==
=== Teams ===
Club	Canton	Stadium	Capacity
FC Baulmes	Vaud	Stade Sous-Ville	2,500
FC Bavois	Vaud	Terrain des Peupliers	1,000
FC Bulle	Fribourg	Stade de Bouleyres	7,000
CS Chênois	Geneva	Stade des Trois-Chêne	8,000
SC Düdingen	Fribourg	Stadion Birchhölzli	3,000
FC Echallens	Vaud	Sportplatz 3 Sapins	2,000
Étoile Carouge FC	Geneva	Stade de la Fontenette	3,690
FC Fribourg	Fribourg	Stade Universitaire	9,000
Grand-Lancy FC	Geneva	Stade de Marignac	1,500
ES FC Malley	Vaud	Centre Sportif de la Tuilière	1,500
FC Martigny-Sports	Valais	Stade d'Octodure	2,500
FC Meyrin	Geneva	Stade des Arbères	9,000
FC Naters	Valais	Sportanlage Stapfen	3,000
Sion U-21	Valais	Stade de Tourbillon	20,200
Urania Genève Sport	Geneva	Stade de Frontenex	4,000
Young Boys U-21	Bern	Stadion Wankdorf or Allmend Bern	32,000; 2,000

=== Final league table ===
Pos	Team	Pld	W	D	L	GF	GA	GD	Pts	Qualification or relegation
1	Sion U-21	30	16	6	8	66	50	+16	54	Not eligible to Play-off
2	ES FC Malley	30	15	8	7	65	45	+20	53	Play-off to Challenge League
3	CS Chênois	30	13	9	8	46	40	+6	48	
4	SC Düdingen	30	13	8	9	62	49	+13	47	
5	Étoile Carouge FC	30	13	7	10	60	54	+6	46	Play-off to Challenge League
6	FC Martigny-Sports	30	14	4	12	46	46	0	46	
7	FC Meyrin	30	11	12	7	64	51	+13	45	
8	FC Fribourg	30	12	8	10	54	46	+8	44	
9	FC Echallens	30	12	8	10	59	52	+7	44	
10	FC Naters	30	10	7	13	53	61	−8	37	
11	FC Baulmes	30	10	6	14	53	76	−23	36	
12	Young Boys U-21	30	10	4	16	48	58	−10	34	
13	Urania Genève Sport	30	8	10	12	49	62	−13	34	
14	Grand-Lancy FC	30	10	4	16	43	62	−19	34	
15	FC Bavois	30	9	5	16	43	55	−12	32	Relegation to 2. Liga Interregional
16	FC Bulle	30	6	10	14	46	50	−4	28	Relegation to 2. Liga Interregional

Source: Erste Liga official website
Rules for classification: 1) Points; 2) Play-off.

== Group 2 ==
=== Teams ===
Club	Canton	Stadium	Capacity
Basel U-21	Basel-City	Stadion Rankhof or Leichtathletik-Stadion St. Jakob	7,000; 4,000
FC Breitenrain Bern	Bern	Spitalacker	1,450
SR Delémont	Jura	La Blancherie	5,263
Grasshopper Club U-21	Zürich	GC/Campus Niederhasli	2,000
FC Grenchen	Solothurn	Stadium Brühl	15,100
SV Höngg	Zürich	Hönggerberg	1,000
FC Laufen	Basel-Country	Sportplatz Nau	3,000
FC Münsingen	Bern	Sportanlage Sandreutenen	1,400
SV Muttenz	Basel-Country	Sportplatz Margelacker	3,200
BSC Old Boys	Basel-City	Stadion Schützenmatte	8,000
FC Schaffhausen	Schaffhausen	Stadion Breite	7,300
FC Solothurn	Solothurn	Stadion FC Solothurn	6,750
FC Wangen bei Olten	Solothurn	Sportplatz Chrüzmatt	3,000
Winterthur U-21	Zürich	Schützenwiese or Schützenwiese Sportplätze	8,550; 1,500
SC YF Juventus	Zürich	Utogrund	2,850
Zürich U-21	Zürich	Sportplatz Heerenschürli	1,120

=== Final league table ===
Pos	Team	Pld	W	D	L	GF	GA	GD	Pts	Qualification or relegation
1	YF Juventus	30	16	10	4	52	33	+19	58	Play-off to Challenge League
2	Basel U-21	30	17	6	7	76	46	+30	57	Not eligible to Play-off
3	Zürich U-21	30	17	6	7	70	40	+30	57	Not eligible to Play-off
4	SR Delémont	30	17	6	7	61	45	+16	57	Play-off to Challenge League
5	FC Münsingen	30	13	7	10	49	39	+10	46	Play-off to Challenge League
6	Grasshopper Club U-21	30	12	9	9	64	55	+9	45	
7	FC Grenchen	30	11	9	10	42	41	+1	42	
8	FC Breitenrain Bern	30	10	10	10	53	43	+10	40	
9	FC Laufen	30	9	7	14	49	59	−10	34	
10	BSC Old Boys	30	8	10	12	40	51	−11	34	
11	FC Solothurn	30	7	12	11	34	45	−11	33	
12	FC Wangen bei Olten	30	9	6	15	48	61	−13	33	
13	SV Muttenz	30	7	10	13	39	47	−8	31	
14	Winterthur U-21	30	8	7	15	44	73	−29	31	
15	FC Schaffhausen	30	7	9	14	38	64	−26	30	Relegation to 2. Liga Interregional
16	SV Höngg	30	7	6	17	49	66	−17	27	Relegation to 2. Liga Interregional

Source: Erste Liga official website
Rules for classification: 1) Points; 2) Play-off

== Group 3 ==
=== Teams ===
Club	Canton	Stadium	Capacity
FC Baden	Aargau	Esp Stadium	7,000
GC Biaschesi	Ticino	Campo Sportivo "Al Vallone"	2,850
SC Cham	Zug	Stadion Eizmoos	1,800
FC Chiasso	Ticino	Stadio Comunale Riva IV	4,000
FC Chur 97	Grisons	Ringstrasse	2,820
FC Emmenbrücke	Lucerne	Stadion Gersag	8,700
USV Eschen/Mauren	(Liechtenstein)	Sportpark Eschen-Mauren	6,000
Lugano U-21	Ticino	Cornaredo Stadium	6,330
Luzern U-21	Lucerne	Swissporarena or Allmend Süd	16,800; 2,000
FC Mendrisio	Ticino	Centro Sportivo Comunale	4,000
FC Rapperswil-Jona	St. Gallen	Stadion Grünfeld	2,500
FC Schötz	Lucerne	Sportplatz Wissenhusen	1,750
St. Gallen U-21	St. Gallen	Espenmoos or Kybunpark	3,000; 19,264
FC Tuggen	Schwyz	Linthstrasse	2,800
SC Zofingen	Aargau	Sportanlagen Trinermatten	2,000
Zug 94	Zug	Herti Allmend Stadion	6,000

=== Final league table ===
Pos	Team	Pld	W	D	L	GF	GA	GD	Pts	Qualification or relegation
1	FC Chiasso	30	19	7	4	63	26	+37	64	Play-off to Challenge League
2	FC Rapperswil-Jona	30	18	7	5	69	44	+25	61	Play-off to Challenge League
3	FC Tuggen	30	16	3	11	69	48	+21	51	Play-off to Challenge League
4	FC Baden	30	14	7	9	59	34	+25	49	
5	Luzern U-21	30	13	7	10	44	43	+1	46	
6	Zug 94	30	13	5	12	48	55	−7	44	
7	FC Mendrisio	30	12	6	12	34	38	−4	42	
8	GC Biaschesi	30	13	2	15	45	53	−8	41	
9	USV Eschen/Mauren	30	11	7	12	53	57	−4	40	
10	St. Gallen U-21	30	11	5	14	48	59	−11	38	
11	SC Zofingen	30	10	7	13	53	56	−3	37	
12	Lugano U-21	30	10	6	14	44	54	−10	36	
13	FC Schötz	30	9	7	14	43	54	−11	34	
14	SC Cham	30	9	6	15	35	43	−8	33	Play-out against relegation
15	FC Emmenbrücke	30	9	6	15	43	54	−11	33	Play-out against relegation
16	FC Chur 97	30	8	2	20	32	64	−32	26	Relegation to 2. Liga Interregional

Source: Erste Liga official website
Rules for classification: 1) Points; 2) Play-off

== Promotion play-offs ==
=== Qualifying Round ===
29 May 2010

Tuggen	0–4	YF Juventus
		Goal

Linthstrasse, Tuggen

2 June 2010

YF Juventus	3–2	Tuggen
Goal		Goal

Utogrund, Zürich

YF Juventus win 7–2 on aggregate.

30 May 2010

Étoile Carouge	1–3	Rapperswil-Jona
Goal		Goal

Stade de la Fontenette, Carouge

2 June 2010

Rapperswil-Jona	5–1	Étoile Carouge
Goal		Goal

Stadion Grünfeld, Rapperswil

Rapperswil-Jona win 8–2 on aggregate.

30 May 2010

Delémont	2–0	ES FC Malley
Goal

La Blancherie, Delémont

2 June 2010

ES FC Malley	2–3	Delémont
Goal		Goal

Centre Sportif de la Tuilière, Lausanne

Delémont win 5–2 on aggregate.

30 May 2010

Münsingen	0–1	Chiasso
	Report	3' Vogt

Sportanlage Sandreutenen, Münsingen
Attendance: 1,000

2 June 2010

Chiasso	2–1	Münsingen
Goal	Report	Goal

Stadio Comunale Riva IV
Attendance: 800

Chiasso win 3–1 on aggregate.

=== Final round ===
5 June 2010

YF Juventus	2–1	Delémont
Goal		Goal

Utogrund, Zürich

9 June 2010

Delémont	4–1	YF Juventus
Goal		Goal

La Blancherie, Delémont

Delémont win 5–3 on aggregate and achieve peomotion.

5 June 2010

Chiasso	1–0	Rapperswil-Jona
Goal

Stadio Comunale Riva IV

9 June 2010

Rapperswil-Jona	0–2	Chiasso
		Goal

Stadion Grünfeld, Rapperswil

Chiasso win 3–0 on aggregate and achieve peomotion.
Chiasso are declaired 1. Liga champions.

=== Play-out against relegation ===
29 May 2010

SC Cham	3–0	FC Emmenbrücke
Goal

Sportplatz Wissenhusen, Schötz

FC Emmenbrücke is relegated to the 2. Liga Interregional.

== Sources ==
- Switzerland 2009/10 at RSSSF
- Season 2009–10 at the official website

Preceded by 2008–09	Seasons in Swiss football	Succeeded by 2010–11
