= 2007–08 Swiss 1. Liga =

1. Liga
- Season: 20–
- Champions: Group 1: Stade Nyonnais; Group 2: Basel U-21; Group 3: Baden
- Promoted: Stade Nyonnais; Biel-Bienne
- Relegated: Group 1: Serrières; Bex; FC Savièse; Group 2: SV Lyss; FC Laufen; Group 3: Brugg; FC Küsnacht; Herisau

The 2007–08 Swiss 1. Liga was the 76th season of this league and at this time was the third tier of the Swiss football league system. The 1. Liga was the highest level of amateur football, although a number of teams had professional or semi-professional players in their ranks.

== Format ==
There were 49 teams in this division this season, including eight U-21 teams which were the eldest youth teams of the professional clubs in the Super League and the Challenge League. The 1. Liga was divided into three regional groups, group 1 with 17 teams, group 2 and group 3 each with 16 teams. Within each group, the teams would play a double round-robin to decide their positions in the league. The three groups winners and three runners-up, together with the two best third placed teams, then contested a play-off for the two promotion slots. The U-21 teams are not eligible for promotion. The last placed three teams in group 1 and the last two placed teams in the other two groups would be relegated. The third last team in group 2 and group 3 were to have a play-off, the loser of which would also be relegated.

== Group 1 ==
=== Teams ===
Club	Canton	Stadium	Capacity
FC Baulmes	Vaud	Stade Sous-Ville	2,500
FC Bex	Vaud	Relais	2,000
FC Echallens	Vaud	Sportplatz 3 Sapins	2,000
FC Bulle	Fribourg	Stade de Bouleyres	7,000
Étoile Carouge FC	Geneva	Stade de la Fontenette	3,690
SC Düdingen	Fribourg	Stadion Birchhölzli	3,000
FC Fribourg	Fribourg	Stade Universitaire	9,000
FC La Tour/Le Pâquier	Fribourg	Stade de Bouleyres	7,000
FC Martigny-Sports	Valais	Stade d'Octodure	2,500
ES FC Malley	Vaud	Centre Sportif de la Tuilière	1,500
FC Meyrin	Geneva	Stade des Arbères	9,000
FC Naters	Valais	Sportanlage Stapfen	3,000
FC Stade Nyonnais	Vaud	Stade de Colovray	7,200
FC Savièse	Valais	Stade St-Germain	1,000
FC Serrières	Neuchâtel	Pierre-à-Bot	1,700
Sion U-21	Valais	Stade de Tourbillon	20,200
Urania Genève Sport	Geneva	Stade de Frontenex	4,000

=== Final league table ===
Pos	Team	Pld	W	D	L	GF	GA	GD	Pts	Qualification or relegation
1	FC Stade Nyonnais	32	23	6	3	65	26	+39	75	Play-off to Challenge League
2	FC Baulmes	32	19	9	4	70	27	+43	66	Did not apply for licence
3	Urania Genève Sport	32	17	7	8	57	45	+12	58	Play-off to Challenge League
4	Étoile Carouge FC	32	16	7	9	69	39	+30	55	Play-off to Challenge League
5	FC Bulle	32	14	6	12	66	56	+10	48	
6	FC Echallens	32	12	9	11	41	35	+6	45	
7	ES FC Malley	32	11	11	10	55	46	+9	44	
8	FC Fribourg	32	12	8	12	58	53	+5	44	
9	Sion U-21	32	11	8	13	49	50	−1	41	
10	SC Düdingen	32	12	5	15	43	52	−9	41	
11	FC Meyrin	32	10	10	12	39	47	−8	40	
12	FC Naters	32	10	10	12	37	47	−10	40	
13	FC Martigny-Sports	32	11	6	15	42	59	−17	39	
14	FC La Tour/Le Pâquier	32	11	5	16	44	54	−10	38	
15	FC Serrières	32	7	13	12	40	57	−17	34	Relegation to 2. Liga Interregional
16	FC Bex	32	8	7	17	40	58	−18	31	Relegation to 2. Liga Interregional
17	FC Savièse	32	3	3	26	34	98	−64	12	Relegation to 2. Liga Interregional

Source: Erste Liga official website
Rules for classification: 1) Points; 2) Play-off

== Group 1 ==
=== Teams ===
Club	Canton	Stadium	Capacity
Basel U-21	Basel-City	Stadion Rankhof or Leichtathletik-Stadion St. Jakob	7,000; 4,000
FC Biel-Bienne	Bern	Tissot Arena	5,200
FC Grenchen	Solothurn	Stadium Brühl	15,100
FC Laufen	Basel-Country	Sportplatz Nau	3,000
Luzern U-21	Lucerne	Swissporarena or Allmend Süd	16,800; 2,000
SV Lyss	Bern	Sportzentrum Grien	1,000
FC Münsingen	Bern	Sportanlage Sandreutenen	1,400
SV Muttenz	Basel-Country	Sportplatz Margelacker	3,200
BSC Old Boys	Basel-City	Stadion Schützenmatte	8,000
FC Olten	Solothurn	Sportanlagen Kleinholz	8,000
FC Schötz	Lucerne	Sportplatz Wissenhusen	1,750
FC Solothurn	Solothurn	Stadion FC Solothurn	6,750
FC Wangen bei Olten	Solothurn	Sportplatz Chrüzmatt	3,000
Young Boys U-21	Bern	Stadion Wankdorf or Allmend Bern	32,000; 2,000
SC Zofingen	Aargau	Sportanlagen Trinermatten	2,000
Zug 94	Zug	Herti Allmend Stadion	6,000

=== Final league table ===
Pos	Team	Pld	W	D	L	GF	GA	GD	Pts	Qualification or relegation
1	Basel U-21	30	20	5	5	70	32	+38	65	Not eligible to Play-offs
2	FC Biel-Bienne	30	17	7	6	49	17	+32	58	Play-off to Challenge League
3	FC Münsingen	30	15	9	6	42	31	+11	54	Play-off to Challenge League
4	Young Boys U-21	30	14	7	9	74	43	+31	49	
5	FC Schötz	30	13	10	7	58	40	+18	49	
6	FC Solothurn	30	12	3	15	58	57	+1	39	
7	FC Wangen bei Olten	30	9	11	10	43	57	−14	38	
8	Luzern U-21	30	9	9	12	47	48	−1	36	
9	FC Olten	30	9	9	12	51	62	−11	36	
10	FC Grenchen	30	9	8	13	37	46	−9	35	
11	BSC Old Boys	30	9	8	13	43	53	−10	35	
12	Zug 94	30	9	8	13	51	66	−15	35	
13	SV Muttenz	30	8	10	12	42	54	−12	34	
14	SC Zofingen	30	8	9	13	49	75	−26	33	Relegation play-out
15	SV Lyss	30	8	8	14	50	57	−7	32	Relegation to 2. Liga Interregional
16	FC Laufen	30	7	7	16	35	61	−26	28	Relegation to 2. Liga Interregional

Source: Erste Liga official website
Rules for classification: 1) Points; 2) Play-off

== Group 3 ==
=== Teams ===
Club	Canton	Stadium	Capacity
FC Baden	Aargau	Esp Stadium	7,000
GC Biaschesi	Ticino	Campo Sportivo "Al Vallone"	2,850
FC Brugg	Aargau	Stadion Au	3,300
Grasshopper Club U-21	Zürich	GC/Campus Niederhasli	2,000
FC Herisau	Appenzell Ausserrhoden	Ebnet	2,000
FC Kreuzlingen	Thurgau	Sportplatz Hafenareal	1,200
FC Küsnacht	Zürich	Sportanlage Heslibach	2,300
FC Mendrisio-Stabio	Ticino	Centro Sportivo Comunale	4,000
FC Rapperswil-Jona	St. Gallen	Stadion Grünfeld	2,500
FC Red Star Zürich	Zürich	Allmend Brunau	2,000
FC Schaffhausen	Schaffhausen	Stadion Breite	7,300
St. Gallen U-21	St. Gallen	Espenmoos or Kybunpark	3,000; 19,264
FC Tuggen	Schwyz	Linthstrasse	2,800
Winterthur U-21	Zürich	Schützenwieseor; Schützenwiese Sportplätze	8,550; 1,500
SC YF Juventus	Zürich	Utogrund	2,850
Zürich U-21	Zürich	Sportplatz Heerenschürli	1,120

=== Final league table ===
Pos	Team	Pld	W	D	L	GF	GA	GD	Pts	Qualification or relegation
1	FC Baden	30	19	6	5	56	31	+25	63	Play-off to Challenge League
2	GC Biaschesi	30	18	7	5	62	31	+31	61	Play-off to Challenge League
3	FC Rapperswil-Jona	30	16	8	6	63	34	+29	56	Play-off to Challenge League
4	FC Schaffhausen	30	16	8	6	67	45	+22	56	
5	Grasshopper Club U-21	30	15	8	7	67	44	+23	53	
6	FC Tuggen	30	14	8	8	55	37	+18	50	
7	FC Red Star Zürich	30	13	6	11	44	40	+4	45	
8	Winterthur U-21	30	11	6	13	55	50	+5	39	
9	Zürich U-21	30	11	6	13	59	55	+4	39	
10	FC Mendrisio-Stabio	30	9	12	9	41	42	−1	39	
11	St. Gallen U-21	30	11	5	14	52	53	−1	38	
12	SC YF Juventus	30	8	9	13	43	57	−14	33	
13	FC Kreuzlingen	30	7	7	16	31	53	−22	28	
14	FC Brugg	30	6	5	19	34	68	−34	23	Relegation play-out
15	FC Küsnacht	30	5	6	19	37	85	−48	21	Relegation to 2. Liga Interregional
16	FC Herisau	30	5	5	20	29	70	−41	20	Relegation to 2. Liga Interregional

Source: Erste Liga official website
Rules for classification: 1) Points; 2) Goal difference; 3) Goals scored; 4) Head-to-head points; 5) Away goals scored; 6) Draw.

== Promotion play-off ==
=== Qualification round ===
Team 1	Agg.	Team 2	1st leg	2nd leg	
Münsingen	1–2	Biaschesi	0–1	1–1	21 and 24 May 2008
Étoile Carouge	0–2	Baden	0–2	0–0	21 and 24 May 2008
Urania Genève Sport	2–3	Biel-Bienne	1–1	1–2	21 and 25 May 2008
Rapperswil-Jona	5–5	Stade Nyonnais	4–3	1–2	22 and 25 May 2008

Nyonnais win on away goals

=== Finals ===
Team 1	Agg.	Team 2	1st leg	2nd leg	
Stade Nyonnais	6–2	Biaschesi	1–0	5–2	28 and 31 May 2008
Biel-Bienne	1–1	Baden	0–0	1–1	28 May and 1 June 2008

Biel-Bienne win on away goals
Stade Nyonnais (declared champion) and Biel-Bienne are promoted to 2008–09 Challenge League.

== Relegation play-out ==
The play-out was one match only and played at Sportplatz Wissenhusen in Schötz.

Team 1	Score	Team 2
SC Zofingen	2–1	FC Brugg

FC Brugg is relegated

== See also ==
- 2006–07 Swiss Super League
- 2006–07 Swiss Challenge League
- 2006–07 Swiss Cup

== Sources ==
- Switzerland 2007/08 at RSSSF
- Season 2007–08 at the official website

Preceded by 2006–07	Seasons in Swiss 1. Liga	Succeeded by 2008–09
