= 2008–09 Swiss 1. Liga =

1. Liga
- Season: 2008–09
- Champions: Group 1: Étoile Carouge; Group 2: Basel U-21; Group 3: Chiasso
- Promoted: Kriens; Le Mont
- Relegated: Group 1: Düdingen; FC La Tour/Le Pâquier; Group 2: Muttenz; FC Olten; Group 3: Kreuzlingen; Red Star
- Matches: 732

The 2008–09 Swiss 1. Liga was the 77th season of this league and at this time was the third tier of the Swiss football league system. The 1. Liga was the highest level of amateur football, although a number of teams had professional or semi-professional players in their ranks.

== Format ==
There were 48 teams in this division, including eight U-21 teams, the eldest youth teams of the professional clubs in the Super League and the Challenge League. The 1. Liga was divided into three regional groups, each with 16 teams. Within each group, the teams would play a double round-robin to decide their positions in the league. The three groups winners and three runners-up, together with the two best third placed teams, then contested a play-off for the two promotion slots. The U-21 teams are not eligible for promotion. The last placed two teams in each group would be relegated.

== Group 1 ==
=== Teams ===
Club	Canton	Stadium	Capacity
FC Baulmes	Vaud	Stade Sous-Ville	2,500
FC Bulle	Fribourg	Stade de Bouleyres	7,000
CS Chênois	Geneva	Stade des Trois-Chêne	8,000
SC Düdingen	Fribourg	Stadion Birchhölzli	3,000
FC Echallens	Vaud	Sportplatz 3 Sapins	2,000
Étoile Carouge FC	Geneva	Stade de la Fontenette	3,690
FC Fribourg	Fribourg	Stade Universitaire	9,000
FC La Tour/Le Pâquier	Fribourg	Stade de Bouleyres	7,000
FC Le Mont	Vaud	Centre Sportif du Châtaignier	2,500
ES FC Malley	Vaud	Centre Sportif de la Tuilière	1,500
FC Martigny-Sports	Valais	Stade d'Octodure	2,500
FC Meyrin	Geneva	Stade des Arbères	9,000
FC Naters	Valais	Sportanlage Stapfen	3,000
Sion U-21	Valais	Stade de Tourbillon	20,200
Urania Genève Sport	Geneva	Stade de Frontenex	4,000
Young Boys U-21	Bern	Stadion Wankdorf or Allmend Bern	32,000; 2,000

=== Final league table ===
Pos	Team	Pld	W	D	L	GF	GA	GD	Pts	Qualification or relegation
1	Étoile Carouge FC	30	20	6	4	71	34	+37	66	Play-off to Challenge League
2	FC Le Mont	30	20	2	8	72	45	+27	62	Play-off to Challenge League
3	ES FC Malley	30	18	6	6	80	39	+41	60	Play-off to Challenge League
4	FC Fribourg	30	16	8	6	56	34	+22	56	
5	FC Meyrin	30	15	5	10	61	51	+10	50	
6	FC Bulle	30	14	6	10	53	50	+3	48	
7	CS Chênois	30	12	6	12	54	42	+12	42	
8	Young Boys U-21	30	10	6	14	51	56	−5	36	
9	FC Echallens	30	9	9	12	39	46	−7	36	
10	FC Naters	30	10	5	15	43	48	−5	35	
11	FC Baulmes	30	9	7	14	49	69	−20	34	
12	FC Martigny-Sports	30	9	7	14	41	62	−21	34	
13	Sion U-21	30	9	6	15	46	58	−12	33	
14	Urania Genève Sport	30	8	9	13	50	64	−14	33	
15	SC Düdingen	30	6	9	15	32	53	−21	27	Relegation to 2. Liga Interregional
16	FC La Tour/Le Pâquier	30	4	5	21	32	79	−47	17	Relegation to 2. Liga Interregional

Source: Erste Liga official website
Rules for classification: 1) Points; 2) Play-off

== Group 2 ==
=== Teams ===
Club	Canton	Stadium	Capacity
Basel U-21	Basel-City	Stadion Rankhof or Leichtathletik-Stadion St. Jakob	7,000; 4,000
SC Cham	Zug	Stadion Eizmoos	1,800
SR Delémont	Jura	La Blancherie	5,263
FC Emmenbrücke	Lucerne	Stadion Gersag	8,700
FC Grenchen	Solothurn	Stadium Brühl	15,100
SC Kriens	Lucerne	Stadion Kleinfeld	5,100
Luzern U-21	Lucerne	Swissporarena or Allmend Süd	16,800; 2,000
FC Münsingen	Bern	Sportanlage Sandreutenen	1,400
SV Muttenz	Basel-Country	Sportplatz Margelacker	3,200
BSC Old Boys	Basel-City	Stadion Schützenmatte	8,000
FC Olten	Solothurn	Sportanlagen Kleinholz	8,000
FC Schötz	Lucerne	Sportplatz Wissenhusen	1,750
FC Solothurn	Solothurn	Stadion FC Solothurn	6,750
FC Wangen bei Olten	Solothurn	Sportplatz Chrüzmatt	3,000
SC Zofingen	Aargau	Sportanlagen Trinermatten	2,000
Zug 94	Zug	Herti Allmend Stadion	6,000

=== Final league table ===
Pos	Team	Pld	W	D	L	GF	GA	GD	Pts	Qualification or relegation
1	Basel U-21	30	24	4	2	98	38	+60	76	Not eligible to Play-offs
2	SC Kriens	30	20	8	2	69	32	+37	68	Play-off to Challenge League
3	FC Schötz	30	17	5	8	66	50	+16	56	Play-off to Challenge League
4	FC Emmenbrücke	30	11	10	9	44	48	−4	43	
5	Luzern U-21	30	12	6	12	64	56	+8	42	
6	BSC Old Boys	30	11	9	10	50	45	+5	42	
7	SC Cham	30	11	9	10	57	53	+4	42	
8	FC Grenchen	30	12	5	13	43	50	−7	41	
9	FC Solothurn	30	12	4	14	59	52	+7	40	
10	SR Delémont	30	11	6	13	59	48	+11	39	
11	Zug 94	30	11	5	14	55	65	−10	38	
12	FC Münsingen	30	8	8	14	38	45	−7	32	
13	SC Zofingen	30	10	2	18	46	75	−29	32	
14	FC Wangen bei Olten	30	9	5	16	43	74	−31	32	
15	SV Muttenz	30	7	5	18	42	66	−24	26	Relegation to 2. Liga Interregional
16	FC Olten	30	6	5	19	31	67	−36	23	Relegation to 2. Liga Interregional

Source: Erste Liga official website
Rules for classification: 1) Points; 2) Play-Off

== Group 3 ==
=== Teams ===
Club	Canton	Stadium	Capacity
FC Baden	Aargau	Esp Stadium	7,000
GC Biaschesi	Ticino	Campo Sportivo "Al Vallone"	2,850
FC Chiasso	Ticino	Stadio Comunale Riva IV	4,000
USV Eschen/Mauren	(Liechtenstein)	Sportpark Eschen-Mauren	6,000
Grasshopper Club U-21	Zürich	GC/Campus Niederhasli	2,000
SV Höngg	Zürich	Hönggerberg	1,000
FC Kreuzlingen	Thurgau	Sportplatz Hafenareal	1,200
FC Mendrisio	Ticino	Centro Sportivo Comunale	4,000
FC Rapperswil-Jona	St. Gallen	Stadion Grünfeld	2,500
FC Red Star Zürich	Zürich	Allmend Brunau	2,000
FC Schaffhausen	Schaffhausen	Stadion Breite	7,300
St. Gallen U-21	St. Gallen	Espenmoos or Kybunpark	3,000; 19,264
FC Tuggen	Schwyz	Linthstrasse	2,800
Winterthur U-21	Zürich	Schützenwieseor; Schützenwiese Sportplätze	8,550; 1,500
SC YF Juventus	Zürich	Utogrund	2,850
Zürich U-21	Zürich	Sportplatz Heerenschürli	1,120

=== Final league table ===
Pos	Team	Pld	W	D	L	GF	GA	GD	Pts	Qualification or relegation
1	FC Chiasso	30	20	8	2	69	28	+41	68	Play-off to Challenge League
2	FC Tuggen	30	19	5	6	70	35	+35	62	Play-off to Challenge League
3	FC Rapperswil-Jona	30	17	10	3	63	35	+28	61	Play-off to Challenge League
4	Zürich U-21	30	15	9	6	63	41	+22	54	
5	USV Eschen/Mauren	30	15	7	8	47	36	+11	52	
6	SV Höngg	30	12	8	10	44	45	−1	44	
7	FC Baden	30	13	4	13	51	44	+7	43	
8	SC YF Juventus	30	12	6	12	53	43	+10	42	
9	Grasshopper Club U-21	29	11	7	11	53	56	−3	40	*
10	St. Gallen U-21	29	9	8	12	51	60	−9	35	*
11	Winterthur U-21	30	10	4	16	47	51	−4	34	
12	FC Schaffhausen	30	9	7	14	40	46	−6	34	
13	GC Biaschesi	30	9	4	17	37	62	−25	31	
14	FC Mendrisio	30	7	9	14	31	52	−21	30	
15	FC Kreuzlingen	30	5	5	20	35	82	−47	20	Relegation to 2. Liga Interregional
16	FC Red Star Zürich	30	2	7	21	28	66	−38	13	Relegation to 2. Liga Interregional

Source: Erste Liga official website
Rules for classification: 1) Points; 2) Play-off

Note: The game between Grasshopper Club Zurich U-21 and FC St. Gallen U-21 was abandoned while the score was still 0-0 due to fan riots and was not counted.

== Play-offs ==
=== Qualification round ===
Team 1	Agg.	Team 2	1st leg	2nd leg	
ES FC Malley	4:6	FC Chiasso	2:3	2:3	2./6. Juni 2009
FC Rapperswil-Jona	3:5	SC Kriens	1:2	2:3	3./6. Juni 2009
FC Schötz	3:1	Étoile Carouge FC	1:0	2:1	3./6. Juni 2009
FC Le Mont	4:1	FC Tuggen	4:1	0:0	3./6. Juni 2009

=== Finals ===
Team 1	Agg.	Team 2	1st leg	2nd leg	
FC Chiasso	2:3	FC Le Mont	2:0	0:3	10./13. Juni 2009
SC Kriens	6:2	FC Schötz	3:1	3:1	10./13. Juni 2009

SC Kriens and FC Le Mont are promoted to Challenge League.

== See also ==
- 2008–09 Swiss Super League
- 2008–09 Swiss Challenge League
- 2008–09 Swiss Cup

== Sources ==
- Switzerland 2008/09 at RSSSF
- Season 2008–09 at the official website

Preceded by 2007–08	Seasons in Swiss 1. Liga	Succeeded by 2009–10
