= Kamel Boughanem =

Moroccan-French football player (born 1979)

Personal information
- Date of birth: 16 March 1979 (age 47)
- Height: 1.82 m (6 ft 0 in)
- Position: Forward

Senior career*
Years	Team	Apps	(Gls)
1995–1997	Etoile-Carouge FC	15	(2)
1997–1998	Vevey Sports	26	(13)
1998–2000	FC Meyrin	46	(24)
2000–2002	FC Fribourg	52	(28)
2002–2003	Etoile-Carouge FC	16	(12)
2003	FC Fribourg	17	(16)
2004	FC Bulle	11	(8)
2004–2006	FC La Chaux-de-Fonds	53	(32)
2006–2007	Lugano	45	(22)
2008	FC Baulmes	13	(12)
2008–2010	Lausanne Sport	41	(15)
2012	Etoile-Carouge FC	13	(2)
- * Club domestic league appearances and goals

Kamel Boughanem (born 16 March 1979) is a French former professional footballer who played as a forward, spending his entire career in Switzerland.
