= Manuel Rivera (footballer, born 1978) =

Peruvian footballer (born 1978)

Rivera
Personal information
- Full name: Manuel Rivera Garrido
- Date of birth: 16 March 1978 (age 48)
- Place of birth: Lima, Peru
- Height: 1.71 m (5 ft 7 in)
- Position: Midfielder

Senior career*
Years	Team	Apps	(Gls)
1999–2000	Bellinzona	27	(3)
2000–2001	Kriens	7	(0)
2001–2002	Bellinzona	51	(8)
2003	Malcantone Agno	15	(3)
2003–2005	Vaduz	49	(1)
2005–2011	Bellinzona	132	(1)
2011–2012	Chiasso	9	(0)
2012–2013	Mendrisio	2	(0)
- * Club domestic league appearances and goals as of 19 December 2025

Manuel Rivera Garrido (born 16 March 1978 in Lima), known as Rivera, is a Peruvian former footballer who played as a midfielder, most notably for Swiss club Bellinzona.

== Club career ==
He is the team current captain and one of the longest current player for Bellinzona.
