= List of football stadiums in Switzerland =

The following is a list of football stadiums in Switzerland, ranked in order of capacity, with the minimum capacity being 4,000. Stadiums in bold are part of the 2025–26 Swiss Super League season.

== Current stadiums ==
#	Image	Stadium	Capacity	City	Home team	UEFA rank
1		**St. Jakob-Park**	38,512	Basel	FC Basel	4/4 stars
2		**Stadion Wankdorf**	31,500	Bern	BSC Young Boys	4/4 stars
3		**Stade de Genève**	30,084	Lancy	Servette FC	4/4 stars
4		**Letzigrund**	26,104	Zürich	FC Zürich, Grasshopper Club Zürich	4/4 stars
5		**Kybunpark**	20,660	St. Gallen	FC St. Gallen	
6		**Swissporarena**	16,800	Lucerne	FC Luzern	
7		Stade Olympique de la Pontaise	15,700	Lausanne	FC Stade Lausanne-Ouchy	
8		**Stade Tourbillon**	14,283	Sion	FC Sion	
9		Stade de la Charrière	12,700	La Chaux-de-Fonds	FC La Chaux-de-Fonds	
10		**Stade de la Tuilière**	12,544	Lausanne	FC Lausanne-Sport	
11		Stade de la Maladière	11,997	Neuchâtel	Neuchâtel Xamax	
12		Stadion Neufeld	11,500	Bern	FC Bern	
13		Stadio Comunale	11,168	Chiasso	FC Chiasso	
14		Stadio Lido	11,000	Locarno	FC Locarno	
15		Stadion Brühl	10,964	Grenchen	FC Grenchen	
16		**Stockhorn Arena**	10,398	Thun	FC Thun	
17		Stadion Brügglifeld	9,249	Suhr	FC Aarau	
18		Stadion Lachen	9,000	Thun	FC Dürrenast	
19		Stade Universitaire	9,000	Fribourg	FC Fribourg	
20		**Stadion Schützenwiese**	8,550	Winterthur	FC Winterthur	
21		Stadion Schützenmatte	8,000	Basel	BSC Old Boys Basel	
22		Stadion Gurzelen	7,820	Biel/Bienne	FC Biel-Bienne	
23		Stadion Breite	7,300	Schaffhausen	FC Schaffhausen	
24		Centre sportif de Colovray	7,200	Nyon	Stade Nyonnais	
25		Stade de la Fontenette	7,200	Carouge	Étoile Carouge FC	
26		Stadion Rankhof	7,000	Basel	FC Concordia Basel, FC Nordstern Basel	
27		Esp Stadium	7,000	Fislisbach	FC Baden	
28		Stadion FC Solothurn	6,750	Solothurn	FC Solothurn	
29		Stade Municipal	6,600	Yverdon-les-Bains	Yverdon-Sport FC	
30		**Cornaredo Stadium**	6,330	Lugano	FC Lugano	
31		Stadion Bergholz	6,048	Wil	FC Wil	
32		Stadio Comunale	6,000	Bellinzona	AC Bellinzona	
33		Espenmoos	5,700	St. Gallen	FC St. Gallen	
34		Stadion Kleinfeld	5,360	Kriens	SC Kriens	
35		La Blancherie	5,263	Delémont	SR Delémont	
36		Tissot Arena	5,200	Biel/Bienne	FC Biel-Bienne	
37		Stade de Bouleyres	5,000	Bulle	FC Bulle	
38		Herti Allmend Stadion	4,900	Zug	Zug 94, SC Cham	
39		Stadion Niedermatten	4,450	Wohlen	FC Wohlen	
40		Paul-Grüninger-Stadion	4,200	St. Gallen	SC Brühl	
41		Stade de Copet	4,000	Vevey	FC Vevey-Sports 05	

== Projects ==
- Stadion Zürich, Zürich (Grasshopper Club Zürich, FC Zürich)

== See also ==
- Stades.ch: the website of all stadiums of Switzerland
- List of European stadiums by capacity
- List of association football stadiums by capacity
- List of association football stadiums by country
- List of sports venues by capacity
- List of stadiums by capacity
- Lists of stadiums
- Football in Switzerland
