= Bruno Valente =

Portuguese footballer

Personal information
- Full name: Bruno Valente
- Date of birth: 30 December 1982 (age 43)
- Height: 1.74 m (5 ft 9 in)
- Position: Striker

Team information
- Current team: FC Fribourg

Senior career*
Years	Team	Apps	(Gls)
1998–2002	FC La Chaux-de-Fonds	75	(41)
2002–2003	Neuchâtel Xamax	33	(2)
2004	FC La Chaux-de-Fonds (loan)	12	(1)
2004	Neuchâtel Xamax	9	(0)
2005	FC Meyrin	16	(3)
2005–2008	FC La Chaux-de-Fonds	94	(42)
2008–2010	AC Lugano	31	(13)
2010–2011	FC Schaffhausen	33	(18)
2011–2012	FC St. Gallen	25	(5)
2012–	FC Fribourg		
- * Club domestic league appearances and goals as of 28 June 2012

Bruno Valente (born 30 December 1982) is a Portuguese footballer. He plays for FC Fribourg. He has spent his whole career in Switzerland.
