= Carlos da Silva =

Portuguese footballer

Personal information
- Full name: Carlos da Silva
- Date of birth: 22 January 1984 (age 42)
- Place of birth: Portugal
- Height: 1.78 m (5 ft 10 in)
- Position: Midfielder

Team information
- Current team: Rapperswil-Jona

Senior career*
Years	Team	Apps	(Gls)
2003–05	Grasshopper	35	(2)
2005–2008	Schaffhausen	92	(8)
2008–2013	Lugano	133	(37)
2013–	Rapperswil-Jona		
- * Club domestic league appearances and goals as of 18 July 2013 ‡ National team caps and goals as of 28 July 2006

Carlos Da Silva (born 22 January 1984) is a footballer from Portugal who currently plays as midfielder for Swiss club Rapperswil-Jona in the 1. Liga Classic.
