= Stadio del Lido =

Football stadium in Locarno, Switzerland

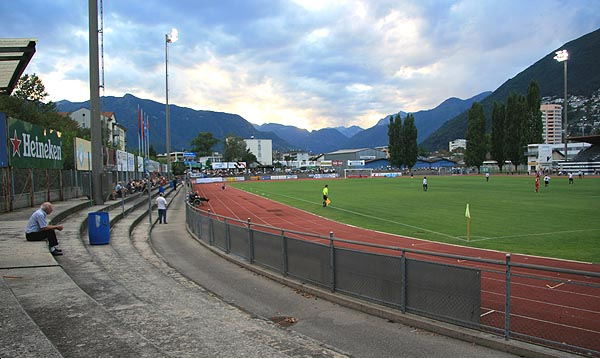
- Lido di Locarno - Spalti
- Interactive map of Stadio del Lido
- Full name: Stadio Comunale del Lido
- Location: Locarno, Ticino, Switzerland
- Coordinates: 46°09′46″N 8°48′06″E
- Owner: City of Locarno
- Capacity: 5,000

Construction
- Built: 1926
- Opened: 1933

Tenant
- FC Locarno

Stadio del Lido is a football stadium in Locarno, Switzerland. It is the home ground of FC Locarno and has a capacity of 5,000. The stadium has 1,000 seats and 4,000 standing places.

== See also ==
- List of football stadiums in Switzerland
