= 2008–09 Swiss Super League =

112th season of top-tier Swiss football

Swiss Super League
- Season: 2008–09
- Dates: 18 July 2008 – 30 May 2009
- Champions: FC Zürich; 12th title
- Relegated: FC Vaduz
- Champions League: FC Zürich
- Europa League: FC Basel; BSC Young Boys; FC Sion (via domestic cup)
- Matches: 180
- Goals: 540 (3 per match)
- Top goalscorer: Seydou Doumbia (20)
- Biggest home win: Young Boys 6–0 Vaduz
- Biggest away win: Vaduz 1–7 Zürich
- Highest scoring: Bellinzona 6–2 Grasshopper; Vaduz 3–5 Zürich; Vaduz 1–7 Zürich

The 2008–09 Swiss Super League was the 112th season of top-tier football in Switzerland. The competition was officially named AXPO Super League due to sponsoring purposes. It began on 18 July 2008 with a match between Young Boys Bern and reigning champions FC Basel, which the latter won by 2–1. The last matches were played in May 2009.

== Teams ==
FC Thun were relegated after finishing in 10th and last place in 2007–08 Swiss Super League. They were replaced by Challenge League 2007–08 champions FC Vaduz, who are the first team from Liechtenstein participating in Switzerland's top football league.

9th placed FC St. Gallen and Challenge League runners-up AC Bellinzona competed in a two-legged relegation play-off after the end of last season. Bellinzona won 5–2 on aggregate and thus earned promotion, while St. Gallen were relegated.

Location of teams in the 2008–09 Swiss Super League

Club	Location	Stadium	Capacity
FC Basel	Basel	St. Jakob-Park	42,500
BSC Young Boys	Bern	Wankdorf	31,783
FC Zürich	Zürich	Letzigrund	23,605
Grasshopper Club Zürich	Zürich	Letzigrund	23,605
FC Sion	Sion	Stade Tourbillon	16,500
FC Luzern	Lucerne	Stadion Allmend	13,000
Neuchâtel Xamax	Neuchâtel	Stade de la Maladière	12,000
FC Aarau	Aarau	Stadion Brügglifeld	9,249
AC Bellinzona	Bellinzona	Stadio Comunale Bellinzona	8,740
FC Vaduz	Vaduz	Rheinpark Stadion	6,127

== League table ==
Pos	Team	Pld	W	D	L	GF	GA	GD	Pts	Qualification or relegation
1	Zürich (C)	36	24	7	5	80	36	+44	79	Qualification to Champions League third qualifying round
2	Young Boys	36	22	7	7	85	46	+39	73	Qualification to Europa League third qualifying round
3	Basel	36	22	6	8	72	44	+28	72	Qualification to Europa League second qualifying round
4	Grasshopper	36	12	14	10	57	48	+9	50	
5	Aarau	36	11	11	14	35	51	−16	44	
6	Bellinzona	36	11	10	15	44	51	−7	43	
7	Neuchâtel Xamax	36	10	10	16	50	57	−7	40	
8	Sion	36	9	10	17	44	60	−16	37	Qualification to Europa League play-off round (Note: Sion won the 2008–09 Swiss Cup and thereby qualified for the play-off round of the UEFA Europa League.)
9	Luzern (O)	36	9	8	19	45	62	−17	35	Qualification to relegation play-off
10	Vaduz (R)	36	5	7	24	28	85	−57	22	Relegation to Swiss Challenge League (Note: Being a Liechtenstein club, Vaduz are not eligible for qualification to European competitions via the Swiss league system. They did, however, qualify for the second qualifying round of the UEFA Europa League by winning their domestic 2008–09 Liechtenstein Cup.)

Source: axposuperleague.ch (in German)
Rules for classification: 1) points; 2) goal difference; 3) number of goals scored.
(C) Champions; (O) Play-off winners; (R) Relegated

== Results ==
Teams play each other four times in this league. In the first half of the season each team played every other team twice (home and away) and then do the same in the second half of the season.

=== First half of season ===
Home \ Away	AAR	BAS	BEL	GCZ	LUZ	NX	SIO	VAD	YB	ZÜR
Aarau		0–2	0–1	1–0	1–0	2–1	3–1	4–0	1–1	2–1
Basel	3–1		2–0	1–0	2–0	4–3	3–0	4–0	1–2	1–1
Bellinzona	1–1	2–3		1–1	2–2	1–2	2–1	1–0	1–2	0–3
Grasshopper	0–0	1–1	3–1		4–2	1–0	3–1	3–0	0–1	2–2
Luzern	3–0	5–1	1–0	0–3		0–1	1–1	1–2	0–3	0–3
Neuchâtel Xamax	0–0	2–0	3–3	1–1	1–0		3–3	2–2	2–3	1–2
Sion	1–1	2–0	0–2	0–0	1–1	0–0		3–1	2–1	1–3
Vaduz	0–2	0–2	0–0	1–1	1–0	1–0	1–2		0–0	1–7
Young Boys	3–3	1–2	3–0	1–3	6–1	2–1	5–0	0–0		2–2
Zürich	4–0	1–4	3–0	2–1	1–0	3–0	1–0	1–0	2–1	

Source: axposuperleague.ch (in German)
Legend: Blue = home team win; Yellow = draw; Red = away team win.

=== Second half of season ===
Home \ Away	AAR	BAS	BEL	GCZ	LUZ	NX	SIO	VAD	YB	ZÜR
Aarau		3–1	0–0	0–3	0–0	0–0	1–0	2–0	0–1	0–3
Basel	3–1		1–1	0–0	2–0	3–0	2–2	5–0	0–3	2–1
Bellinzona	1–2	1–1		6–2	2–0	2–0	1–0	3–1	2–1	0–1
Grasshopper	1–1	4–1	1–3		1–0	1–1	0–2	2–0	3–3	2–2
Luzern	4–0	1–2	4–2	1–1		2–1	1–0	3–1	2–3	1–3
Neuchâtel Xamax	3–1	2–3	1–0	4–1	3–3		3–2	3–1	2–3	0–1
Sion	2–0	0–4	2–2	1–4	1–1	1–0		2–1	2–3	0–1
Vaduz	1–1	0–1	1–0	2–2	1–2	2–4	1–5		3–1	3–5
Young Boys	4–0	3–2	3–0	3–1	5–2	0–0	2–1	6–0		4–2
Zürich	2–1	1–3	0–0	2–1	1–1	3–0	2–2	5–0	3–0	

Source: axposuperleague.ch (in German)
Legend: Blue = home team win; Yellow = draw; Red = away team win.

== Relegation play-offs ==
FC Lucern as 9th-placed team of the Super League were played a two-legged play-off against Challenge League runners-up AC Lugano.

10 June 2009
20:15 CEST

Lugano	1–0	Luzern
Renfer 15'

Cornaredo Stadium, Lugano
Attendance: 7,200
Referee: Claudio Circhetta

13 June 2009
18:45 CEST

Luzern	5–0	Lugano
Renggli 14'; Chiumiento 52' (pen.); Paiva 77', 83'; Scarione 80'

Stadion Allmend, Lucerne
Attendance: 12,500
Referee: Cyril Zimmermann

Luzern won 5–1 on aggregate.

== Top goalscorers ==
Updated on 24 May 2009; Source: football.ch (in German)

Rank	Player	Club	Goals
1	(Ivory Coast) Seydou Doumbia	BSC Young Boys	20
2	(Switzerland) Almen Abdi	FC Zürich	19
3	(France) Eric Hassli	FC Zürich	17
4	(France) Alexandre Alphonse	FC Zürich	13
4	(Ghana) Joetex Asamoah Frimpong	FC Lucerne	13
6	(Australia) Scott Chipperfield	FC Basel	12
7	(Switzerland) Mauro Lustrinelli	AC Bellinzona	11
7	(Portugal) João Paiva	FC Lucerne	11
7	(France) Olivier Monterrubio	FC Sion	11
10	(Switzerland) Benjamin Huggel	FC Basel	10
10	(Nigeria) Ideye Aide Brown	Neuchâtel Xamax	10
10	(Switzerland) Mario Raimondi	BSC Young Boys	10

== Awards ==
- Super League Player of the Year: Seydou Doumbia (BSC Young Boys)
- Goal of the Year: Fabian Frei (FC Basel, scored against FC Aarau)
- Coach of the Year: Bernard Challandes (FC Zürich)
- Youngster of the Year: Valentin Stocker (FC Basel)
- Fair Play Trophy: FC Aarau

== Attendances ==
#	Club	Average
1	Basel	21,044
2	Young Boys	17,985
3	Zürich	9,830
4	Sion	9,383
5	Luzern	8,074
6	GCZ	6,497
7	Aarau	5,583
8	Xamax	5,086
9	Bellinzona	4,012
10	Vaduz	2,177
