= Stade de la Fontenette =

Football stadium in Carouge, Switzerland

- Interactive map of Stade de la Fontenette
- Location: Carouge, Switzerland
- Capacity: 3,600
- Surface: artificial turf

Construction
- Built: 1966
- Opened: 1966
- Renovated: 2008; 2020-2021

Tenants
- Étoile Carouge FC (1966-present); Servette FC Chênois Féminin (2021-2024)

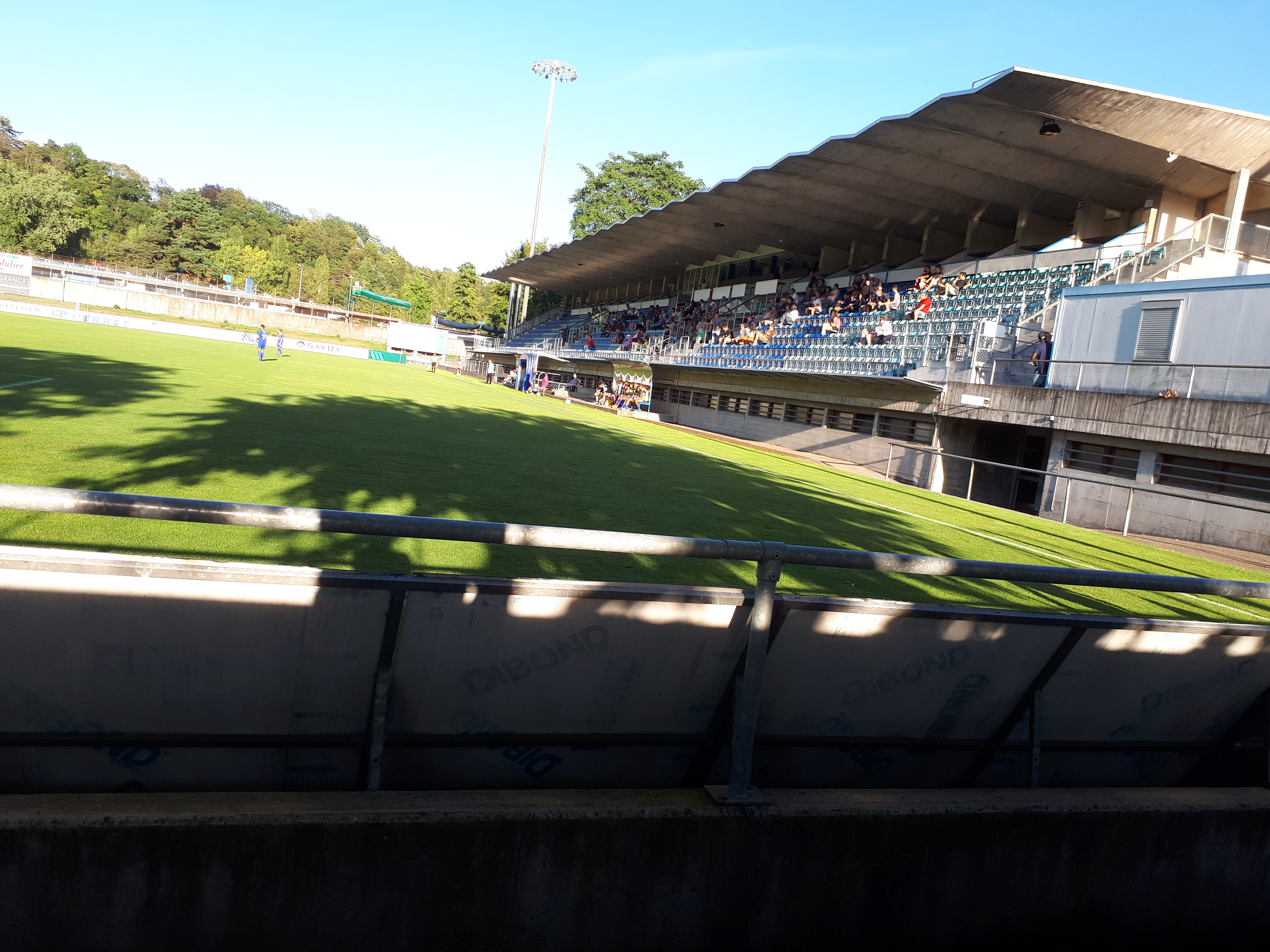
Étoile Carouge FC vs FC Azzurri 90 Lausanne

Stade de la Fontenette is a football stadium in Carouge, Switzerland. The stadium has a capacity of 3,600.

It is the home ground of Étoile Carouge FC of the Challenge League. Servette FC Chênois Féminin of the AXA Women's Super League (AWSL) played at the stadium from 2021 to 2024.

== See also ==
- List of football stadiums in Switzerland
