= Swiss Challenge League =

Association football league in Switzerland

Challenge League
- Founded: 1898; 128 years ago as Swiss Serie B 1944; 82 years ago as Nationalliga B
- Country: Switzerland
- Confederation: UEFA
- Number of clubs: 10
- Level on pyramid: 2
- Promotion to: Super League
- Relegation to: Promotion League
- Domestic cup: Swiss Cup
- Current champions: Vaduz (2025–26)
- Website: sfl.ch/challengeleague
- Current: 2026–27 Challenge League

The Challenge League (known as the Dieci Challenge League for sponsorship reasons) is the second-highest tier of the Swiss football league system and lower of two professional leagues in the country. Ten teams play in the Challenge League; the winners of the league are promoted to the Super League, while the bottom-placed team is relegated to the Promotion League.

== Overview ==
The Challenge League is played over 36 rounds from the end of July to May, with a winter break from mid-December to the first week of February. Each team plays each other four times, twice at home and twice away, in a round-robin.

The bottom team will be relegated to the Promotion League and replaced by the respective champion for the next season. The club finishing in 2nd place will compete against the ninth-placed team of the Super League in a promotion play-off over two games, home and away, for a spot in the succeeding tournament.

== History ==
Previous names
Years	German	French	Italian
1898–1922	Serie B		
1922–1930	Serie Promotion		
1930–31	Zweite Liga	2^{e} Ligue	Seconda Lega
1931–1944	Erste Liga	1^{e} Ligue	Prima Lega
1944–2003	Nationalliga B	Ligue Nationale B	Lega Nazionale B
2003–present 2008–09 2012–2021 2021–present	Challenge League Dosenbach Challenge League brack.ch Challenge League dieci Challenge League		

=== Serie B and Serie Promotion ===
The Serie B was first carried out in 1898. In the year before, Genevan newspaper La Suisse Sportive organized the first unofficial Swiss Championship, where the Coupe Ruinart was awarded to Grasshopper Club Zürich. The first Serie B was competed for this same cup. The final game was held between Cantonal Lausanne, FC Bern, and Vereinigte St. Gallen, with Cantonal Lausanne beating first FC Bern 2-0 and then Vereinigte St. Gallen 3-2 to win the championship. In the 1900-01 season, Serie B winner Fortuna Basel were the first team to be promoted to the Serie A. In the following two seasons, the second teams of Grasshopper Club Zürich and FC Zürich won the Serie B and thus no teams were promoted. The Serie B was held under this name until 1922. However, records of these times are spotty at best.

In 1922, the league was renamed to Serie Promotion and was split into three regions East, West, and Central with each region further subdivided into two groups. The respective regional group winners played a final game and the three regional champions qualified for the final round. While SC Veltheim won the first Serie Promotion, all three participants of the final round were promoted to the Serie A. In the following seasons, regional Serie B champions played relegation/promotion playoffs against the last placed of the regional leagues in the Serie A. This format would persist until the 1929–30 season.

Starting in 1930, both Serie A and B were renamed to First and Second League, respectively, and in the season after the Second League become the First League (as the previous First League became known as the National League). These name changes came as a push to create the aforementioned National League, which no longer would be split into regional groups. This reorganization was finally realized for the 1933–34 season, however the First League maintained regional groups. The league was split into a western and eastern group, except in the 1939/40 season where five regional groups were created due to the World War.

=== National League B Era ===
Starting with the 1944–45 season, the National League B (NLB) was created. Fourteen teams, the top seven teams of both groups in the 1943–44 season, minus champions AC Bellinzona, plus the relegated FC Luzern, would participate in the inaugural season. Initially, the top two of the league were promoted, while the bottom two were relegated. In the 1976–77 season, the number of teams was increased to sixteen. After the number of teams was reverted in 1979, the number of teams was increased again in 1981. This increase was also mirrored by the National League A.

For the 1986–87 season, playoffs between the top four of the NLB and the bottom four of the NLA were played, with only two of them getting promoted, as the NLA would reduce the number of teams to twelve for the next season. At the same time the NLB was increased to 24 teams, split once again into two regional groups. Furthermore, the seasons were also split into two stages: a qualifying stage and promotion/relegation stage. During the promotion/relegation stage, the bottom four teams of the NLA would be joined by the top six of both groups. These sixteen teams were once again split into two groups and the top two of both groups would gain promotion to the NLA. For relegation, the bottom six teams of either group were shuffled into two groups, where the bottom two of both groups are relegated to the First League.

The number of teams in the NLB was reduced to 20 in 1993 and further reduced to 16 in 1994. Starting with the 1995–96 season, the NLB was once again reunited and slimmed down to twelve teams. The promotion/relegation and relegation playoffs would also no longer be split into two groups. Both playoffs would be played in a round-robin group with eight teams, with the top four promoted/remaining in the NLA and NLB, respectively. Bottom four would be relegated/remain in the NLB or First League, respectively.

=== Challenge League Era ===
At the beginning of the 21st century, further format changes to the top Swiss leagues were suggested. Starting with the 2003-04 season, the league was renamed to Challenge League. Unlike the top league, the Super League, the Challenge League did not have a title sponsor at first, until the 2008-09 season which was named the Dosenbach Challenge League. The league would again be without a title sponsor for the following four season. Between 2013 and 2021, it was named brack.ch Challenge League and since the 2021–22 season it is called the dieci Challenge League.

The number of participants has fluctuated since the renaming of the league. Initially, the Challenge League had 17 participants, but in the following season it was increased to 18. To make the league more attractive to viewers, it was reduced again to 16 participants in 2008 and then further down to ten in 2012. This last reduction came as a result of the creation of the Promotion League. Similarly, the number of teams relegated and promoted to and from the former First League (later Promotion League) had also fluctuated. With the new Promotion League, it has been a simple 1-up 1-down promotion/relegation format between Challenge League and Promotion League.

Promotion to the Super League had also been restructured along with the name changes. The old promotion/relegation playoffs were scrapped and replaced with the simpler 1-up 1-down format. Between 2003 and 2012, the second placed team of the Challenge League would also play a two-legged promotion/relegation playoff against the second-to-last team of the Super League. This playoff was dropped in 2012 and later reintroduced for the 2018–19 season.

== Clubs ==
=== Current season ===
Locations of clubs in the 2025–26 Challenge League teams

Team	Foundation	Hometown	Venue	Capacity
FC Aarau	1902-05-26	(Switzerland) Aarau	Stadion Brügglifeld	8,000
AC Bellinzona	1904	(Switzerland) Bellinzona	Stadio Comunale	5,000
Étoile Carouge	1904-07-01	(Switzerland) Carouge	Stade de la Fontenette	3,600
Neuchâtel Xamax	1912	(Switzerland) Neuchâtel	Stade de la Maladière	12,000
Rapperswil-Jona	1928	(Switzerland) Rapperswil	Stadion Grünfeld	2,500
Stade Lausanne Ouchy	1901	(Switzerland) Lausanne	Stade Olympique (Note: Stade-Lausanne-Ouchy's home stadium Stade Juan-Antonio-Samaranch in Lausanne can not accommodate SLO for the Challenge League. SLO will play at the Stade Olympique de la Pontaise in Lausanne.)	15,850
Stade Nyonnais	1905	(Switzerland) Nyon	Stade de Colovray	7,200
FC Vaduz	1932-02-14	(Liechtenstein) Vaduz	Rheinpark Stadion	7,584
FC Wil	1900	(Switzerland) Wil	Sportpark Bergholz	6,010
Yverdon Sport	1897	(Switzerland) Yverdon-les-Bains	Stade Municipal	6,600

=== Promotion/relegation from 2024–25 season ===
- FC Thun is promoted to the Super League as champions of 2024–25 Swiss Challenge League
- Yverdon-Sport FC is relegated from Super League as last placed team
- FC Aarau remains in the Challenge League as the losers of promotion play-off
- FC Rapperswil-Jona are promoted as the champions of 2024–25 Promotion League
- FC Schaffhausen are relegated to Promotion League as last placed team

== Results ==
=== Nationalliga B Era ===
Season	League Winner	Promoted from playoffs/Promoted as runners up	Teams Relegated
1960–61	FC Lugano	FC Schaffhausen	Neuchâtel Xamax Nordstern Basel
1961–62	FC Chiasso	FC Sion	FC Martigny-Sports FC Yverdon-Sports
1962–63	FC Schaffhausen	Neuchâtel Xamax	FC Bodio FC Fribourg
1963–64	FC Lugano	AC Bellinzona	Etoile Carouge FC FC Vevey-Sports 05
1964–65	Urania Genève Sport	Young Fellows Zürich	FC Bern FC Schaffhausen
1965–66	FC Winterthur	FC Moutier	FC Porrentruy Neuchâtel Xamax
1966–67	FC Luzern	AC Bellinzona	Le Locle-Sports Blue Stars Zürich
1967–68	FC Winterthur	FC St.Gallen	FC Moutier FC Bern
1968–69	FC Wettingen	FC Fribourg	FC Baden FC Solothurn
1969–70	FC Sion	FC Luzern	FC Thun FC Langenthal
1970–71	FC St.Gallen	FC Grenchen	Young Fellows Zürich Urania Genève Sport
1971–72	FC Chiasso	FC Fribourg	FC Monthey US Gambarogno
1972–73	Neuchâtel Xamax	CS Chênois	SC Brühl SC Buochs
1973–74	FC Luzern	FC Vevey-Sports 05	Young Fellows Zürich FC Tössfeld
1974–75	FC Biel-Bienne	FC La Chaux-de-Fonds	FC Giubiasco Mendrisiostar
1975–76	AC Bellinzona	-	FC Martigny-Sports FC Wettingen
1976–77	Étoile Carouge FC	Young Fellows Zürich	Mendrisiostar FC Raron
1977–78	Nordstern Basel	FC Chiasso	FC Gossau FC Bulle
1978–79	FC La Chaux-de-Fonds	FC Luzern FC Lugano	Étoile Carouge FC Young Fellows Zürich
1979–80	AC Bellinzona	Nordstern Basel	FC Raron FC Baden
1980–81	FC Vevey-Sports 05	FC Aarau FC Bulle	SC Kriens
1981–82	FC Winterthur	FC Wettingen	Aurore Bienne FC Altstätten FC Frauenfeld
1982–83	FC La Chaux-de-Fonds	FC Chiasso	FC Bern FC Ibach FC Rüti ZH
1983–84	SC Zug	FC Winterthur	FC Fribourg FC Nordstern Basel FC Red Star Zürich
1984–85	FC Grenchen	FC Baden	Mendrisiostar FC Yverdon-Sports FC Monthey
1985–86	FC Locarno	AC Bellinzona	FC Zug FC Laufen Le Locle-Sports
1986–87	FC Grenchen	None	SC Kriens
1987–88	Étoile Carouge FC (West) FC Lugano (East)	FC Wettingen FC Lugano	FC Solothurn FC Vevey-Sports 05 FC Wangen bei Olten
1988–89	FC Yverdon-Sports (West) FC Basel (East)	FC Zürich	FC Biel-Bienne Renens FC Urania Genève Sport
1989–90	FC Fribourg (West) FC Baden (East)	FC Zürich	FC Brüttisellen FC Martigny-Sports FC Zug
1990–91	FC Yverdon-Sports (West) FC Locarno (South & East)	None	CS Chênois SC Burgdorf FC Montreux-Sports
1991–92	FC Basel (West) FC Schaffhausen (South & East)	FC Chiasso	ES Malley SC Zug FC Glarus
1992–93	FC Yverdon-Sports (West) FC Luzern (East)	FC Luzern SC Kriens FC Yverdon-Sports	FC Wettingen FC Châtel-St-Denis FC Brüttisellen SC Bümpliz 78 FC Emmenbrücke FC Chur FC La Chaux-de-Fonds
1993–94	Étoile Carouge FC (West) FC Schaffhausen (East)	FC Basel FC St. Gallen	BSC Old Boys FC Bulle Urania Genève Sport FC Chiasso FC Monthey FC Sursee FC Fribourg
1994–95	FC Yverdon-Sports (West) SC Kriens (East)	None	AC Bellinzona FC Grenchen
1995–96	SC Kriens	None	FC Chiasso FC Naters
1996–97	Étoile Carouge FC	Étoile Carouge FC SC Kriens	FC Gossau FC Meyrin
1997–98	BSC Young Boys	FC Lugano BSC Young Boys	FC Winterthur SV Schaffhausen
1998–99	FC Wil	SR Delémont FC Yverdon-Sports	FC Locarno FC Chiasso
1999–2000	AC Bellinzona	FC Sion	Stade Nyonnais FC Schaffhausen
2000–01	BSC Young Boys	BSC Young Boys	FC Wangen bei Olten FC Solothurn
2001–02	FC Wil 1900	FC Wil 1900 FC Thun	FC Locarno Étoile Carouge FC
2002–03	FC Vaduz	None	FC Lugano^{1} FC Lausanne-Sport^{1} FC Sion^{1}

^{1} FC Lugano and FC Lausanne-Sport went bankrupt which meant that no team was relegated due to their league position. FC Sion were not awarded a license for the 2003–04 season resulted in an extra team being promoted.

=== Challenge League Era ===
The league statistics of the Challenge League era:

Year	1st Position	2nd Position	Playoff result	Relegated
2003–04	Schaffhausen	Vaduz	Neuchâtel Xamax 2:0 Vaduz Vaduz 2:1 Neuchâtel Xamax Neuchâtel Xamax won 3:2 on aggregate	Delémont (Note: Sion were admitted to the league on October 29, 2003, after the season had already begun which brought the number of teams in the division to 17. Only one club was relegated and two were promoted to extend the league to 18 clubs for the 2004–05 season.)
2004–05	Yverdon-Sport	Vaduz	Schaffhausen 1:1 Vaduz Vaduz 0:1 Schaffhausen Schaffhausen won 2:1 on aggregate	Baden (Note: Baden were not relegated due to Servette being demoted to 1. Liga because of financial difficulties.); Bulle
2005–06	Luzern	Sion	Sion 0:0 Neuchâtel Xamax Neuchâtel Xamax 0:3 Sion Sion won 3:0 on aggregate	Baden; Meyrin
2006–07	Neuchâtel Xamax	Bellinzona	Bellinzona 1:2 Aarau Aarau 3:1 Bellinzona Aarau won 5:2 on aggregate	Baulmes; YF Juventus
2007–08	Vaduz	Bellinzona	Bellinzona 3:2 St. Gallen St. Gallen 0:2 Bellinzona Bellinzona won 5:2 on aggregate	Delémont (Note: Delémont and Kriens were also relegated due to the league being downsized to 16 teams for the 2008–09 season.); Kriens; Chiasso; Cham
2008–09	St. Gallen	Lugano	Lugano 1:0 Luzern Luzern 5:0 Lugano Luzern won 5:1 on aggregate	Locarno (Note: Locarno and Gossau were not relegated due to Concordia and La Chaux-de-Fonds being denied professional licenses.); Gossau
2009–10	Thun	Lugano	Bellinzona 2:1 Lugano Lugano 0:0 Bellinzona Bellinzona won 2:1 on aggregate	Le Mont; Gossau
2010–11	Lausanne	Servette	Bellinzona 1:0 Servette Servette 3:1 Bellinzona Servette won 3:2 on aggregate	Schaffhausen; Yverdon
2011–12	St. Gallen	Aarau	Sion 3:0 Aarau Aarau 1:0 Sion Sion won 3:1 on aggregate	Nyon; Carouge; Delémont; Kriens; Brühl
2012–13	Aarau	Bellinzona		Locarno (Note: Locarno were not relegated due to Bellinzona being stripped of their professional licenses during the season.)
2013–14	Vaduz	Lugano		Locarno
2014–15	Lugano	Servette		Biel/Bienne (Note: Biel/Bienne were not relegated due to Servette being denied professional licenses.)
2015–16	Lausanne	Wil		Biel/Bienne (Note: Biel/Bienne were stripped of their professional licenses during the season.)
2016–17	Zürich	Neuchâtel Xamax		Wil< (Note: Wil were not relegated due to Le Mont relinquishing their professional licenses.)
2017–18	Neuchâtel Xamax	Schaffhausen		Wohlen
2018–19	Servette	Aarau	Neuchâtel Xamax 0:4 Aarau Aarau 0:4 (4:5 p) Neuchâtel Xamax Xamax won after 4:4 on aggregate and 5:4 in penalty shootout.	Rapperswil-Jona
2019–20	Lausanne	Vaduz	Vaduz 2:0 Thun Thun 4:3 Vaduz Vaduz won 5:4 on aggregate.	none (Note: No team was relegated due to the cancellation of the Swiss Promotion League caused by the COVID-19 pandemic in Switzerland.)
2020–21	Grasshoppers	Thun	Thun 1:4 Sion Sion 2:3 Thun Sion won 6:4 on aggregate.	Chiasso
2021–22	Winterthur	Schaffhausen	Schaffhausen 2-2 Luzern Luzern 2-0 Schaffhausen Luzern won 4:2 on aggregate.	Kriens
2022–23 (Note: Due to the format change and increased number of teams in the 2023–24 Swiss Super League, top two teams will be directly promoted and no teams will be relegated at the end of the season. Third-placed and last-placed teams advance to a promotion and relegation play-offs, respectively.)	Yverdon	Lausanne	Promotion play-off: Sion 0–2 Lausanne Ouchy Lausanne Ouchy 4–2 Sion Lausanne Ouchy wins 6–2 on aggregate Relegation play-off: Rapperswil-Jona 1–3 Xamax Xamax 3–0 Rapperswil-Jona Xamax wins 6–1 on aggregate	none
2023–24	Sion	Thun	Grasshopper 1–1 Thun; Thun 1–2 Grasshopper Grasshopper wins 3–2 on aggregate.	Baden
2024–25	Thun	Aarau	Grasshopper 4–0 Aarau; Aarau 1–0 Grasshopper Grasshopper wins 4–1 on aggregate.	Schaffhausen
2025–26	Vaduz	Aarau	Aarau 0–0 Grasshopper; Grasshopper 2–1 Aarau (a.e.t.) Grasshopper wins 2–1 on aggregate.	Bellinzona

== See also ==
- Sports league attendances
