= Stade Municipal (Yverdon) =

Football stadium in Switzerland

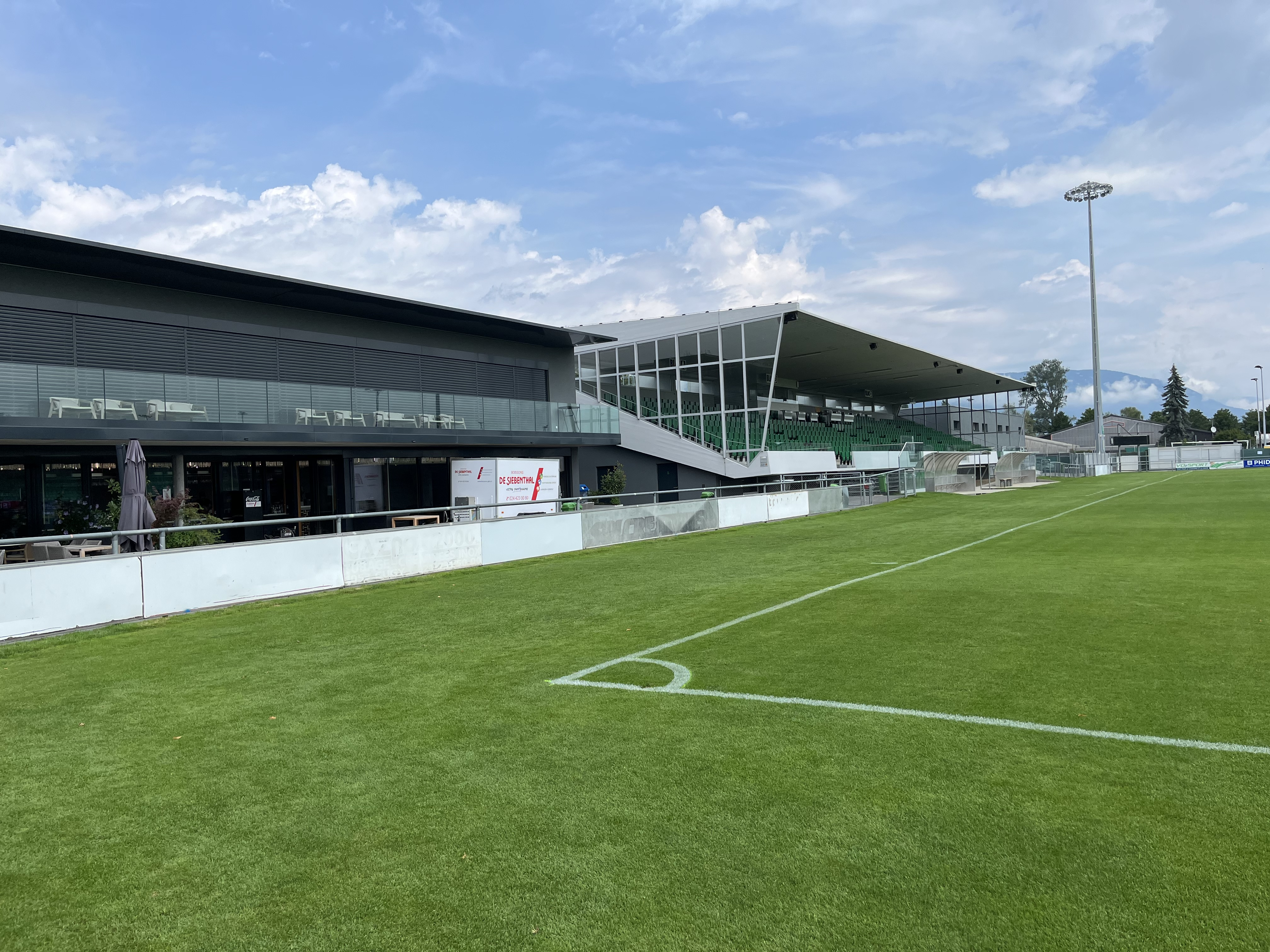
- Interactive map of Stade Municipal
- Location: Rue des Pêcheurs 16, 1400 Yverdon-les-Bains, Switzerland
- Coordinates: 46°46′59.9″N 6°38′49.4″E
- Owner: Municipality Yverdon-les-Bains
- Capacity: 6,600
- Surface: Grass
- Field size: 105 m × 68 m (344 ft × 223 ft)

Construction
- Built: 1989

Tenant
- Yverdon Sport FC

Stade Municipal is a multi-use stadium in Yverdon-les-Bains, Switzerland. It is used mostly for football matches and is the home ground of Yverdon-Sport FC and has a capacity of 6,600. The stadium has 1,000 seats and 5,600 standing places.

It has 4 grass pitches equipped with floodlights as well as an illuminating training area.
