= Stadion Breite =

Swiss sports stadium

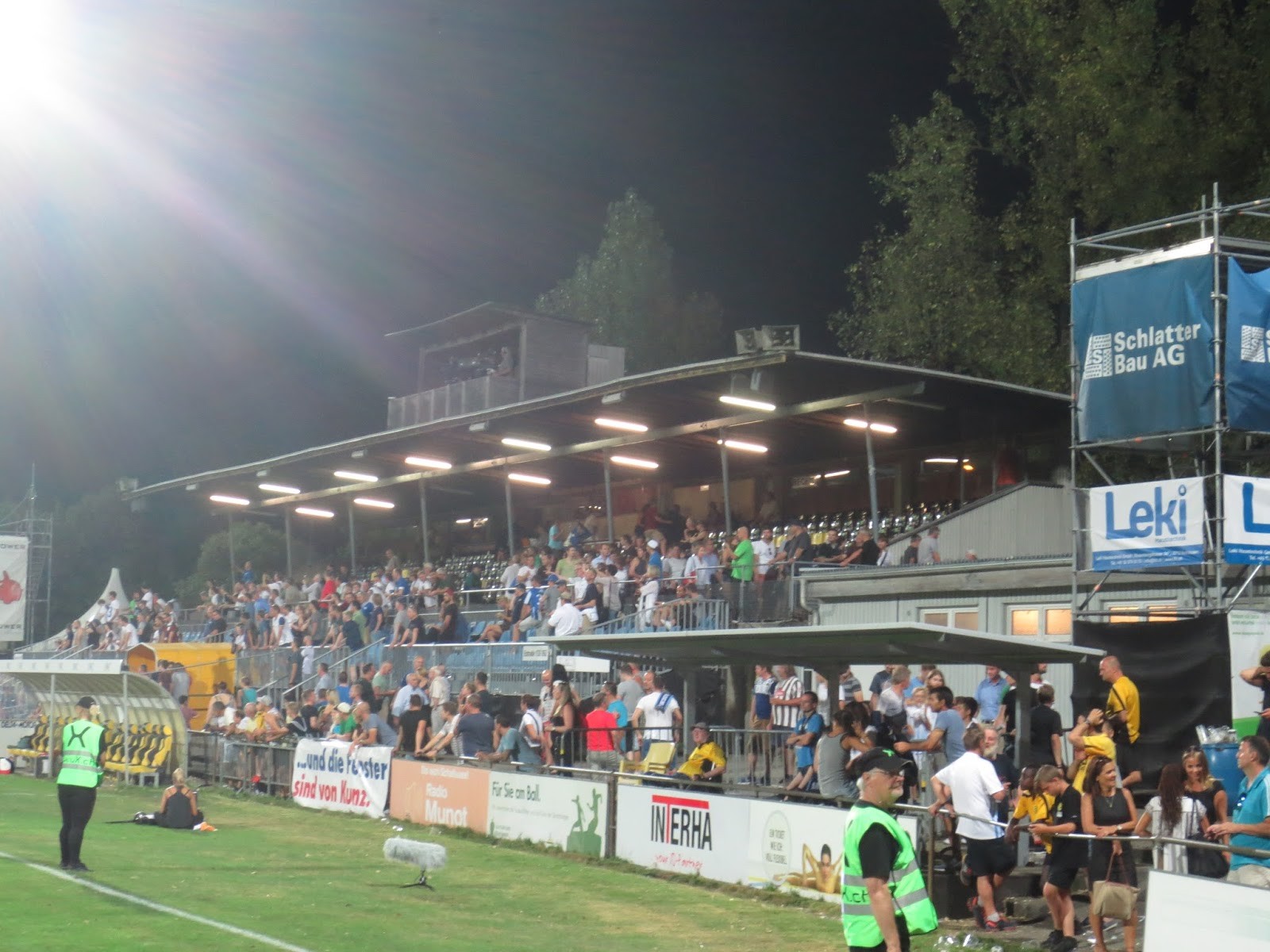
- Mainstand Stadion Breite
- Interactive map of Stadion Breite
- Location: Schaffhausen, Switzerland
- Coordinates: 47.703655°N 8.625515°E
- Capacity: 7,300
- Surface: Grass

Construction
- Opened: 1950

Tenant
- FC Schaffhausen

Stadion Breite is a multi-purpose stadium in Schaffhausen, Switzerland. It is currently used mostly for football matches and was the home ground of FC Schaffhausen until they moved to LIPO Park Schaffhausen in 2017. The current capacity of the stadium is 7,300. The stadium has 1,028 covered seats, 262 uncovered seats and 6,010 standing places.
