= Pedro Pacheco (footballer, born 1997) =

Portuguese footballer

Personal information
- Full name: Pedro Jorge Pacheco Seabra
- Date of birth: 27 January 1997 (age 29)
- Place of birth: Castelões de Cepeda, Portugal
- Height: 1.87 m (6 ft 2 in)
- Position: Centre-back

Team information
- Current team: Santa Clara
- Number: 4

Youth career
- 2009–2011: Black Stars Basel
- 2011–2012: Basel
- 2012–2013: Concordia Basel
- 2013–2015: Basel

Senior career*
Years	Team	Apps	(Gls)
2015–2017	Basel U21	64	(2)
2017–2019	Basel	0	(0)
2018	→ Rapperswil-Jona	3	(0)
2018–2019	→ YF Juventus	8	(0)
2019–2021	Amarante	48	(4)
2021–2023	Mafra	57	(4)
2023–	Santa Clara	41	(4)

International career^{‡}
2016	Portugal U19	3	(1)
2016–2017	Portugal U20	4	(0)
- * Club domestic league appearances and goals as of 20:00, 20 September 2026 (UTC) ‡ National team caps and goals as of 13:03, 12 August 2024 (UTC)

Pedro Jorge Pacheco Seabra (born 27 January 1997) is a Portuguese professional footballer who plays as a centre-back for Primeira Liga club Santa Clara.

== Club career ==
Born in Portugal, Pacheco moved to Switzerland at the age of 12 with his father who found work there in construction. He began playing football with Black Stars Basel before briefly joining FC Basel's youth academy as a U15. He then spent a year with Concordia Basel's academy before returning to Basel to finish his development. In 2015 he debuted with the Basel U21s, before being promoted to their senior side and signing his first professional contract for 3 years on 25 April 2017. On 26 February 2018, he went on loan with Rapperswil-Jona for a half-season in the Swiss Challenge League. The following season, he went on loan with Young Fellows Juventus. In 2019, he returned to Portugal with Amarante in the Campeonato de Portugal. After 2 seasons there, he moved to the Liga Portugal 2 side Mafra on 29 June 2021 where he also stayed 2 seasons.

On 25 June 2023, Pacheco moved to Santa Clara and helped them win the 2023–24 Liga Portugal 2 and earn promotion to the Primeira Liga.

== International career ==
Pacheco was born in Portugal and raised in Switzerland and has dual-citizenship. He played for the Portugal U19s at the 2016 UEFA European Under-19 Championship. He was called up to the Portugal U20s in 2016.

== Career statistics ==
As of match played 20 September 2026

Appearances and goals by club, season and competition
Club	Season	League			Cup		League cup		Other		Total	
Club	Season	Division	Apps	Goals	Apps	Goals	Apps	Goals	Apps	Goals	Apps	Goals
Basel U21	2014–15	Swiss Promotion League	9	1	—		—		—		9	1
Basel U21	2015–16	Swiss Promotion League	22	0	—		—		—		22	0
Basel U21	2016–17	Swiss Promotion League	30	0	—		—		—		30	0
Basel U21	2017–18	Swiss Promotion League	13	1	—		—		—		13	1
Basel U21	Total		64	2	—		—		—		64	2
Basel	2017–18	Swiss Super League	0	0	1	0	—		—		1	0
Rapperswil-Jona (loan)	2017–18	Swiss Challenge League	3	0	—		—		—		3	0
YF Juventus (loan)	2018–19	Swiss Promotion League	8	0	—		—		—		8	0
Amarante	2019–20	Campeonato de Portugal	23	2	2	0	—		—		25	2
Amarante	2020–21	Campeonato de Portugal	25	2	1	0	—		—		26	2
Amarante	Total		48	4	3	0	—		—		51	4
Mafra	2021–22	Liga Portugal 2	27	1	7	1	1	0	—		35	2
Mafra	2022–23	Liga Portugal 2	30	3	3	0	3	0	—		36	3
Mafra	Total		57	4	10	1	4	0	—		71	5
Santa Clara	2023–24	Liga Portugal 2	32	4	5	0	0	0	—		37	4
Santa Clara	2025–26	Primeira Liga	2	0	0	0	—		1 (Note: Appearance in UEFA Conference League)	0	3	0
Santa Clara	2026–27	Primeira Liga	7	0	0	0	—		—		7	0
Santa Clara	Total		41	4	5	0	0	0	1	0	47	4
Career total			221	14	19	1	4	0	1	0	245	15

== Honours ==
Santa Clara

- Liga Portugal 2: 2023–24
