= 2022–23 Yverdon-Sport FC season =

Yverdon-Sport FC
2022–23 season
- Chairman: Mario Di Pietrantonio
- Manager: Marco Schällibaum
- Stadium: Stade Municipal
- Swiss Challenge League: 1st
- Swiss Cup: Round 2
- Top goalscorer: League: Brian Beyer; Koro Koné(12 each); All: Brian Beyer; Koro Koné(12 each)

The 2022–23 season was the 126th season in the history of Yverdon-Sport FC and their second consecutive season in the second division. The club participated in Swiss Challenge League and the Swiss Cup. The season covered the period from 1 July 2022 to 30 June 2023.

== Players ==
As of 3 August 2022

Note: Flags indicate national team as defined under FIFA eligibility rules; some limited exceptions apply. Players may hold more than one non-FIFA nationality.

No.	Pos.	Nation	Player
1	GK	SUI	Tim Spycher (on loan from Basel)
2	DF	SUI	Sandro Theler (on loan from Sion)
3	DF	SUI	Aris Sörensen
4	DF	BIH	Sead Hajrović
6	DF	FRA	William Le Pogam
7	MF	GBS	Mauro Rodrigues (on loan from Sion)
8	MF	FRA	Hugo Fargues
10	MF	SUI	Ali Kabacalman
11	MF	POR	Marculino Ninte
15	DF	SUI	Luca Jaquenoud
16	DF	SUI	Nicolas Gétaz
18	MF	SUI	Nehemie Lusuena

No.	Pos.	Nation	Player
20	FW	CIV	Koro Koné
21	MF	SUI	Alan Rodriguez
22	GK	SUI	Kevin Martin
23	DF	SUI	Miguel Rodrigues
24	MF	CMR	Christian Zock
25	FW	CMR	Steve Leo Beleck
26	MF	BRA	Silva
29	FW	SUI	Théo Berdayes (on loan from Sion)
32	DF	SUI	Anthony Sauthier
68	FW	FRA	Brian Beyer
70	MF	MNE	Vasko Kalezić
71	MF	COD	Breston Malula
99	GK	SUI	Mirco Mazzeo

== Pre-season and friendlies ==
Win Draw Loss

26 June 2022 Global Tour for Peace	Yverdon-Sport (Switzerland)	1–1	(Ukraine) Dynamo Kyiv	Yverdon-les-Bains
16:00 CEST (UTC+2)				Stadium: Stade Municipal; Attendance: 800

29 June 2022 Friendly	Yverdon-Sport (Switzerland)	1–2	(Switzerland) Sion	Yverdon-les-Bains
18:45 CEST (UTC+2)				Stadium: Stade Municipal

1 July 2022 Friendly	Yverdon-Sport (Switzerland)	2–0	(Switzerland) Grasshopper	Yverdon-les-Bains
15:00 CEST (UTC+2)				Stadium: Stade Municipal

9 July 2022 Friendly	Bavois (Switzerland)	1–9	(Switzerland) Yverdon	Bavois
16:00 CEST (UTC+2)				Stadium: Stade des Peupliers

== Competitions ==
=== Overall record ===
Competition	First match	Last match	Starting round	Final position	Record							
Competition	First match	Last match	Starting round	Final position	Pld	W	D	L	GF	GA	GD	Win %
Swiss Challenge League	15 July 2022	27 May 2023	Matchday 1	Winners	36	20	6	10	64	53	+11	55.56
Swiss Cup	20 August 2022	18 September 2022	Round 1	Round 2	1	0	0	1	4	5	−1	0.00
Total					37	20	6	11	68	58	+10	54.05

Source: Soccerway

=== Swiss Challenge League ===
==== League table ====
Pos	Team	Pld	W	D	L	GF	GA	GD	Pts	Promotion or qualification
1	Yverdon (C, P)	36	20	6	10	64	53	+11	66	Promotion to Swiss Super League
2	Lausanne (P)	36	17	10	9	58	43	+15	61	Promotion to Swiss Super League
3	Lausanne-Ouchy (Note: Lausanne-Ouchy were deducted 3 points on 1 November 2022, due to license violations. This decision was overturned following the team's appeal on 22 November 2022.) (O, P)	36	17	9	10	70	53	+17	60	Qualification for the promotion play-off
4	Aarau	36	15	12	9	63	57	+6	57	
5	Wil	36	16	8	12	62	52	+10	56	

Source: Swiss Challenge League
Rules for classification: 1) Points; 2) Goal difference; 3) Goals scored; 4) Head-to-head goal difference; 5) Away goals scored; 6) Draw.
(C) Champions; (O) Play-off winners; (P) Promoted

==== Results summary ====
Overall								Home						Away					
Pld	W	D	L	GF	GA	GD	Pts	W	D	L	GF	GA	GD	W	D	L	GF	GA	GD
36	20	6	10	64	53	+11	66	11	4	3	33	16	+17	9	2	7	31	37	−6

Source: Swiss Challenge League

==== Results by round ====
Round	1	2	3	4	5	6	7	8	9	10	11	12	13	14	15	16	17	18	19	20	21	22	23	24	25	26	27	28	29	30	31	32	33	34	35	36
Ground	H	A	H	A	H	A	H	A	H	A	H	A	A	H	A	H	A	H	A	H	A	H	A	H	A	H	A	H	A	H	A	H	H	A	H	A
Result	W	D	W	W	L	W	L	L	D	L	W	W	W	W	L	W	L	W	W	W	W	D	L	D	W	W	L	W	W	L	D	W	W	L	D	W
Position																																				

Source: Swiss Challenge League
A = Away; H = Home; W = Win; D = Draw; L = Loss

==== Matches ====
The league fixtures were announced on 17 June 2022.

2 April 2023 27	Lausanne	2–0	Yverdon-Sport	Lausanne
16:30 CEST (UTC+2)		Report		Stadium: Stade de la Tuilière

7 April 2023 28	Yverdon-Sport	2–0	Neuchâtel Xamax	Yverdon-les-Bains
20:15 CEST (UTC+2)		Report		Stadium: Stade Municipal

14 April 2023 29	Schaffhausen	3–4	Yverdon-Sport	Schaffhausen
19:30 CEST (UTC+2)		Report		Stadium: Wefox Arena Schaffhausen

21 April 2023 30	Yverdon-Sport	1–2	Bellinzona	Yverdon-les-Bains
20:00 CEST (UTC+2)		Report		Stadium: Stade Municipal

30 April 2023 31	Vaduz	0–0	Yverdon-Sport	Vaduz
14:15 CEST (UTC+2)		Report		Stadium: Rheinpark Stadion

5 May 2023 32	Yverdon-Sport	1–0	Lausanne	Yverdon-les-Bains
19:30 CEST (UTC+2)		Report		Stadium: Stade Municipal

13 May 2023 33	Yverdon-Sport	1–0	Thun	Yverdon-les-Bains
18:00 CEST (UTC+2)		Report		Stadium: Stade Municipal

19 May 2023 34	Lausanne Ouchy	4–1	Yverdon-Sport
20:15 CEST (UTC+2)		Report

23 May 2023 35	Yverdon-Sport	1–1	Aarau	Yverdon-les-Bains
20:15 CEST (UTC+2)		Report		Stadium: Stade Municipal

27 May 2023 36	Wil	0–2	Yverdon-Sport
18:00 CEST (UTC+2)		Report

=== Swiss Cup ===
20 August 2022 Round 1	Bavois	1–3	Yverdon-Sport	Bavois
16:00 CEST (UTC+2)				Stadium: Stade des Peupliers

18 September 2022 Round 2	Schaffhausen	4–1	Yverdon-Sport	Schaffhausen
14:00 CEST (UTC+2)				Stadium: Wefox Arena Schaffhausen
