= Mychell Chagas =

Brazilian footballer

Personal information
- Full name: Mychell Ruan da Silva Chagas
- Date of birth: 6 June 1989 (age 37)
- Place of birth: Recife, Brazil
- Height: 1.83 m (6 ft 0 in)
- Position: Forward

Team information
- Current team: Young Fellows Juventus
- Number: 9

Youth career
- FC Zürich
- –2007: Young Fellows Juventus
- 2007–2009: FC Winterthur

Senior career*
Years	Team	Apps	(Gls)
2007	Young Fellows Juventus	4	(0)
2007–2009	Winterthur U21	61	(8)
2010	Winterthur	0	(0)
2010	→ Grenchen (loan)	1	(0)
2011–2015	Young Fellows Juventus	112	(52)
2016–2017	Rapperswil-Jona	55	(34)
2017–2020	Servette	55	(20)
2020	Grasshopper Club	14	(11)
2020–2021	Nantong Zhiyun	42	(14)
2022	PSS Sleman	12	(0)
2023	Yanbian Longding	10	(4)
2024	FC Dietikon	13	(9)
2024–	Young Fellows Juventus	63	(30)
- * Club domestic league appearances and goals as of 20 August 2026

Mychell Ruan da Silva Chagas (born 6 June 1989) is a Brazilian professional footballer who plays as a forward for 1. Liga Classic club Young Fellows Juventus.

== Career ==
On 22 December 2017 he would join second tier football club Servette. He would go on to win the 2018–19 Swiss Challenge League division with the club and promotion to the top tier.

On 22 September 2020, Chagas joined China League One club Nantong Zhiyun.

In June 2022, Chagas joined Liga 1 club PSS Sleman.

In July 2023, Chagas returned to China and signed a with China League One club Yanbian Longding.

On 2 February 2024, Chagas returned to Switzerland and signed a with Swiss 1. Liga club FC Dietikon.

== Career statistics ==
As of 22 December 2022

Appearances and goals by club, season and competition
Club	Season	League			Cup		Continental		Other		Total	
Club	Season	Division	Apps	Goals	Apps	Goals	Apps	Goals	Apps	Goals	Apps	Goals
YF Juventus	2006–07	Swiss Challenge League	4	0	0	0	–		0	0	4	0
FC Winterthur U21	2007–08	1. Liga - 3	23	0	0	0	–		0	0	23	0
FC Winterthur U21	2008–09	1. Liga - 3	22	5	0	0	–		0	0	22	5
FC Winterthur U21	2009–10	1. Liga - 2	16	5	0	0	–		0	0	16	5
FC Winterthur U21	Total		61	8	0	0	0	0	0	0	61	8
Grenchen (loan)	2009–10	1. Liga - 2	1	0	0	0	–		0	0	1	0
YF Juventus	2011–12	1. Liga - 3	21	4	0	0	–		0	0	21	4
YF Juventus	2012–13	Swiss Promotion League	25	15	0	0	–		1 (Note: Appearances in Swiss Cup qualifiers)	0	26	15
YF Juventus	2013–14	Swiss Promotion League	27	17	2 (Note: Appearances in the Swiss Cup)	2	–		0	0	29	19
YF Juventus	2014–15	Swiss Promotion League	23	8	0	0	–		0	0	23	7
YF Juventus	2015–16	Swiss Promotion League	16	8	1	1	–		0	0	17	9
YF Juventus	Total		112	52	3	3	0	0	1	0	116	55
Rapperswil-Jona	2015–16	Swiss Promotion League	9	2	0	0	–		0	0	9	2
Rapperswil-Jona	2016–17	Swiss Promotion League	29	22	1	0	–		0	0	30	22
Rapperswil-Jona	2017–18	Swiss Challenge League	17	10	3	3	–		0	0	20	13
Rapperswil-Jona	Total		55	34	4	3	0	0	0	0	59	37
Servette	2017–18	Swiss Challenge League	15	6	0	0	–		0	0	15	6
Servette	2018–19	Swiss Challenge League	32	14	1	1	–		0	0	33	15
Servette	2019–20	Swiss Super League	8	0	1	0	–		0	0	9	0
Servette	Total		55	20	2	1	0	0	0	0	57	21
Grasshoppers	2019–20	Swiss Challenge League	14	11	0	0	–		0	0	14	11
Nantong Zhiyun	2020	China League One	10	2	–		–		–		10	2
Nantong Zhiyun	2021	China League One	32	12	1	0	–		–		33	12
Nantong Zhiyun	Total		42	14	1	0	0	0	0	0	43	14
PSS Sleman	2022–23	Liga 1	12	0	0	0	–		0	0	12	0
Career total			356	139	10	7	0	0	1	0	367	146

== Honours ==
FC Rapperswil-Jona

- Swiss Promotion League: 2016–17

Servette FC

- Swiss Challenge League: 2018–19
