= Arian Kabashi (footballer, born 1996) =

Kosovan footballer

Personal information
- Date of birth: 26 September 1996 (age 30)
- Place of birth: Sierre, Switzerland
- Height: 1.82 m (6 ft 0 in)
- Position: Centre-back

Youth career
- –2014: Sion

Senior career*
| Years | Team | Apps | (Gls) |
| 2014–2015 | FC Sierre | 18 | (1) |
| 2015–2016 | Martigny | 23 | (1) |
| 2016–2020 | Sion U21 | 89 | (2) |
| 2020–2022 | Sion | 12 | (0) |
| 2022–2023 | Lahti | 32 | (0) |
| 2024 | Ekenäs | 12 | (1) |
| 2025–2026 | Botev Vratsa | 33 | (1) |
| 2026 | FK Csíkszereda | 8 | (0) |

International career
| 2017–2018 | Kosovo U21 | 8 | (0) |
- * Club domestic league appearances and goals as of 16 May 2026

Arian Kabashi (born 26 September 1996) is a professional footballer who plays as a centre-back.

== Club career ==
=== Sion ===
On 5 July 2020, Kabashi made his debut as a professional footballer in a 2–1 away defeat against St. Gallen after coming on as a substitute at 46th minute in place of Jean Ruiz.

=== Lahti ===
On 26 July 2022, Kabashi joined Veikkausliiga side Lahti until the end of the season. Three days later, he made his debut in a 1–1 home draw against Ilves after coming on as a substitute at 66th minute in place of Arlind Sejdiu.

=== Ekenäs IF ===
On 11 March 2024, Kabashi signed with newly promoted Veikkausliiga club Ekenäs IF on a short contract until 18 July 2024.

=== Botev Vratsa ===
In January 2025, Kabashi joined Bulgarian First League club Botev Vratsa.

== International career ==
At the start of April 2013, Kabashi received a call-up from Albania U15 for a selection camp in Switzerland. On 21 March 2017, he received a call-up from Kosovo U21 for a 2019 UEFA European Under-21 Championship qualification match against Republic of Ireland U21, and made his debut after being named in the starting line-up.

== Personal life ==
Kabashi is a Muslim and he fasts during Ramadan. His Albanian ancestry can be traced to the Kabashi tribe.

== Career statistics ==
=== Club ===
As of 16 May 2026

| Club | Season | League | | | National cup (Note: Includes Swiss Cup, Finnish Cup and Bulgarian Cup) | | Other | | Total | |
| Club | Season | Division | Apps | Goals | Apps | Goals | Apps | Goals | Apps | Goals |
|---|---|---|---|---|---|---|---|---|---|---|
| FC Sierre | 2014–15 | Swiss 2. Liga Interregional | 18 | 1 | 0 | 0 | — | | 18 | 1 |
| Martigny | 2015–16 | Swiss 1. Liga | 23 | 1 | 3 | 0 | — | | 26 | 1 |
| Sion U21 | 2016–17 | Swiss Promotion League | 17 | 1 | — | | — | | 17 | 1 |
| Sion U21 | 2017–18 | Swiss Promotion League | 21 | 0 | — | | — | | 21 | 0 |
| Sion U21 | 2018–19 | Swiss Promotion League | 26 | 1 | — | | — | | 26 | 1 |
| Sion U21 | 2019–20 | Swiss Promotion League | 16 | 0 | — | | — | | 16 | 0 |
| Sion U21 | 2021–22 | Swiss Promotion League | 16 | 0 | — | | — | | 16 | 0 |
| Sion U21 | Total | | 89 | 2 | — | | — | | 89 | 2 |
| Sion | 2019–20 | Swiss Super League | 4 | 0 | 1 | 0 | — | | 5 | 0 |
| Sion | 2020–21 | Swiss Super League | 1 | 0 | 0 | 0 | — | | 1 | 0 |
| Sion | 2021–22 | Swiss Super League | 7 | 0 | 0 | 0 | — | | 7 | 0 |
| Sion | Total | | 12 | 0 | 1 | 0 | — | | 13 | 0 |
| Lahti | 2022 | Veikkausliiga | 9 | 0 | 1 | 0 | 2 (Note: Appearances in Veikkausliiga promotion/relegation play-offs) | 0 | 14 | 0 |
| Lahti | 2023 | Veikkausliiga | 23 | 0 | 1 | 0 | 4 (Note: Appearances in Finnish League Cup) | 1 | 28 | 1 |
| Lahti | Total | | 32 | 0 | 2 | 0 | 6 | 1 | 40 | 1 |
| Ekenäs | 2024 | Veikkausliiga | 12 | 1 | 2 | 0 | 0 | 0 | 14 | 1 |
| Botev Vratsa | 2024–25 | Bulgarian First League | 15 | 0 | 2 | 0 | 1 (Note: Appearances in Bulgarian First League promotion/relegation play-offs) | 0 | 18 | 0 |
| Botev Vratsa | 2025–26 | Bulgarian First League | 18 | 1 | 2 | 0 | — | | 20 | 1 |
| Botev Vratsa | Total | | 33 | 1 | 4 | 0 | 1 | 0 | 38 | 1 |
| FK Csíkszereda | 2025–26 | Liga I | 8 | 0 | 0 | 0 | — | | 8 | 0 |
| Career total | | | 227 | 6 | 12 | 0 | 7 | 1 | 246 | 7 |
