= Kabash (disambiguation) =

Kabash is a town in Kosovo.

Kabash may also refer to:

- Kabash Mountain, a mountain in Kosovo
- Kabashi, a tribe of northern Albania
- Kabash, Elbasan, a village in the municipality of Gramsh, Elbasan County, Albania
- Kabash, Korçë, a village in the municipality of Kolonjë, Korçë County, Albania
- Kabash, Shkodër, a village in the municipality of Pukë, Shkodër County, Albania
