= Pedro Pacheco =

Pedro Pacheco may refer to:

- Pedro Pacheco de Villena (1488-1560), Spanish cardinal and Viceroy of Naples
- Pedro Pacheco (engineer) (born 1967), Portuguese civil engineer
- Pedro Pacheco (soccer, born 1984), Canadian soccer defensive midfielder
- Pedro Pacheco (footballer, born 1997), Portuguese football centre-back for Santa Clara
