= Ali Kabacalman =

Swiss footballer (born 1995)

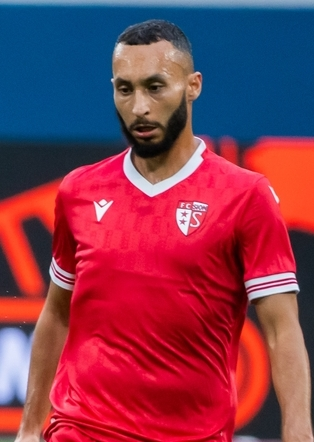
- Kabacalman in 2025

Personal information
- Date of birth: 27 September 1995 (age 31)
- Place of birth: Lausanne, Switzerland
- Height: 1.76 m (5 ft 9 in)
- Position: Defensive midfielder

Team information
- Current team: Sion
- Number: 88

Youth career
- Lausanne-Sport

Senior career*
Years	Team	Apps	(Gls)
2013–2018	Lausanne-Sport	3	(0)
2013–2014	→Monthey (loan)	11	(0)
2014–2015	→FC Azzurri 90 (loan)	16	(0)
2015–2017	Team Vaud U21	51	(6)
2018–2019	Chiasso	28	(0)
2019–2023	Yverdon-Sport	101	(4)
2022	Yverdon-Sport II	1	(0)
2023–	Sion	117	(9)
- * Club domestic league appearances and goals as of 28 September 2026

Ali Kabacalman (born 27 March 1995) is a Swiss professional footballer who plays as a defensive midfielder for Swiss Super League club Sion.

== Club career ==
Kabacalman is a product of this hometown club Lausanne-Sport, and began his senior career with Monthey and FC Azzurri 90 in 2013 and 2014 respectively in the Swiss 1. Liga. He returned to Lausanne in 2015, where he helped them win the 2015–16 Swiss Challenge League.

In 2018, Kabacalman moved to Chiasso for a couple of seasons, before a stint with Rapperswil-Jona in January 2019. In the summer of 2019, he joined Yverdon Sport, then in the Swiss Promotion League. After 4 seasons with Yverdon Sport where he won the 2020–21 Promotion League and 2022–23 Swiss Challenge League, he transferred to Sion on 21 July 2023. He helped Sion win the 2023–24 Swiss Challenge League and played in the Swiss Super League for the first time in the 2024–25 season. On 5 March 2025, he extended his contract with Sion until 2027 and was named captain at the club.

== Personal life ==
Born in Switzerland, Kabacalman is of Turkish descent.

== Honours ==
Lausanne-Sport

- Swiss Challenge League: 2015–16

Yverdon Sport

- Swiss Promotion League: 2020–21
- Swiss Challenge League: 2022–23

Sion

- Swiss Challenge League: 2023–24
