= 2020–21 Promotion League =

Swiss Promotion League
- Season: 2020–2021
- Champions: Yverdon-Sport
- Promoted: Yverdon-Sport
- Relegated: Köniz; Münsingen
- Matches: 176

The 2020–21 Promotion League season was the 9th edition (the 7th since its name change). The league is the third highest level in the Swiss football league system, behind the Super League and the Challenge League.

== Format ==
The Championship had 16 teams, of which three were U-21 teams, the eldest youth teams of the Super or Challenge League clubs. The number of U-21 teams permitted in this division was limited to four (until 2022) and they were not eligible to promotion. The top placed team, of those eligible, would be promoted and the two teams lowest in the table would be relegated. However, the start of the season was delayed and the format of the league was modified due to the COVID-19 pandemic situation. In the first stage each team played once against each of the other 15 teams in a round robin format. The table was then divided into two equal groups. The top eight teams again played once against the other seven for the promotion slot and the bottom eight played once against the others to decide relegation.

== Teams ==
The previous season had been suspended and later cancelled due to the coronavirus measures. It was not rated and there were no promotions or relegations. Therefore, the teams remained the same as in the previous period.

Club	Canton	Stadium	Capacity
Basel U-21	Basel-City	Stadion Rankhof or Youth Campus Basel	7,000; 1,000
FC Bavois	Vaud	Terrain des Peupliers	659
AC Bellinzona	Ticino	Stadio Comunale Bellinzona	5,000
FC Black Stars Basel	Basel-City	Buschwilerhof	1,200
FC Breitenrain Bern	Bern	Spitalacker	1,450
SC Brühl	St. Gallen	Paul-Grüninger-Stadion	4,200
SC Cham	Zug	Stadion Eizmoos	1,800
Étoile Carouge FC	Geneva	Stade de la Fontenette	3,690
FC Köniz	Bern	Liebefeld	1,000
FC Münsingen	Bern	Sportanlage Sandreutenen	1,400
FC Stade Nyonnais	Vaud	Stade de Colovray	7,200
Rapperswil-Jona	St. Gallen	Stadion Grünfeld	2,500
Sion U-21	Valais	Stade de Tourbillon	20,200
SC Young Fellows Juventus	Zürich	Utogrund	2,850
Yverdon-Sport FC	Vaud	Stade Municipal	8,200
Zürich U-21	Zürich	Sportplatz Heerenschürli	1,120

== First stage league table ==
Pos	Team	Pld	W	D	L	GF	GA	GD	Pts
1	Yverdon-Sport	15	11	3	1	47	13	+34	36
2	Cham	15	9	3	3	27	15	+12	30
3	Brühl	15	7	6	2	25	16	+9	27
4	Étoile Carouge	15	8	2	5	26	21	+5	26
5	Rapperswil-Jona	15	7	3	5	32	20	+12	24
6	Bavois	15	7	3	5	16	19	−3	24
7	FC Stade Nyonnais	15	5	7	3	21	14	+7	22
8	Basel U-21	15	7	1	7	30	30	0	22
9	YF Juventus	15	6	4	5	23	31	−8	22
10	Breitenrain	15	5	5	5	22	26	−4	20
11	Sion U-21	15	5	3	7	16	17	−1	18
12	Black Stars	15	5	2	8	22	28	−6	17
13	Bellinzona	15	2	9	4	20	22	−2	15
14	Zürich U-21	15	4	3	8	25	33	−8	15
15	Köniz	15	3	1	11	18	40	−22	10
16	Münsingen	15	0	3	12	10	35	−25	3

Source: RSSSF
Rules for classification: 1) Points; 2) Goal difference; 3) Goals scored; 4) Head-to-head points; 5) Away goals scored; 6) Draw.

== Promotion group ==
Pos	Team	Pld	W	D	L	GF	GA	GD	Pts	Qualification or relegation
1	Yverdon-Sport	22	13	7	2	60	25	+35	46	Promotion to 2021–22 Challenge League
2	Cham	22	12	4	6	43	28	+15	40	
3	Rapperswil-Jona	22	10	6	6	46	29	+17	36	
4	Bavois	22	10	6	6	32	31	+1	36	
5	Basel U-21	22	10	5	7	48	39	+9	35	
6	Étoile Carouge	22	9	6	7	38	35	+3	33	
7	Brühl	22	8	7	7	31	37	−6	31	
8	FC Stade Nyonnais	22	6	9	7	29	27	+2	27	

Source: RSSSF
Rules for classification: 1) Points; 2) Goal difference; 3) Goals scored; 4) Head-to-head points; 5) Away goals scored; 6) Draw.

== Relegation group ==
Pos	Team	Pld	W	D	L	GF	GA	GD	Pts	Qualification or relegation
1	Bellinzona	22	7	10	5	33	28	+5	31	
2	Black Stars	22	9	4	9	38	34	+4	31	
3	Breitenrain	22	8	7	7	34	38	−4	31	
4	YF Juventus	22	7	9	6	39	45	−6	30	
5	Zürich U-21	22	8	4	10	37	40	−3	28	
6	Sion U-21	22	6	6	10	30	36	−6	24	
7	Köniz	22	4	4	14	24	52	−28	16	Relegation to 1. Liga Classic
8	Münsingen	22	0	4	18	14	52	−38	4	Relegation to 1. Liga Classic

Source: RSSSF
Rules for classification: 1) Points; 2) Goal difference; 3) Goals scored; 4) Head-to-head points; 5) Away goals scored; 6) Draw.
