= 2015–16 Promotion League =

Promotion League
- Season: 2015–16
- Champions: Servette FC
- Promoted: Servette FC
- Relegated: FC St. Gallen U-21 Étoile Carouge
- Matches: 240
- Top goalscorer: Samel Sabanovic (16 goals)

The 2015–16 Promotion League season is the fourth season of this league. It had previously been called 1. Liga Promotion but underwent a name change before the previous season. The Promotion League is the third highest level in the Swiss football league system, behind the Super League and the Challenge League.

The season started on 5 August 2015 and finished on 28 May 2016. The league was won by Servette FC who made an immediate return to the Challenge League while FC St. Gallen U-21 and Étoile Carouge were relegated to the 1. Liga Classic.

== Teams ==
Last season Xamax had been division champions and were promoted to the 2015–16 Challenge League. Locarno and Delémont had ended the season in the two last positions and were therefore relegated. Thus the 2015–16 season saw three new clubs in the league, SC Cham and SC Kriens had both been promoted from the 1. Liga Classic and Servette FC had suffered relegation from the Challenge League.

Club	Canton	Stadium	Capacity
Basel U-21	Basel-City	Stadion Rankhof or Youth Campus Basel	7,000; 1,000
FC Breitenrain Bern	Bern	Spitalacker	1,450
SC Brühl	St. Gallen	Paul-Grüninger-Stadion	4,200
SC Cham	Zug	Stadion Eizmoos	1,800
Étoile Carouge FC	Geneva	Stade de la Fontenette	3,690
FC Köniz	Bern	Sportplatz Liebefeld-Hessgut	2,600
SC Kriens	Lucerne	Stadion Kleinfeld	5,100
BSC Old Boys	Basel-City	Stadion Schützenmatte	8,000
FC Rapperswil-Jona	St. Gallen	Stadion Grünfeld	2,500
Servette FC	Geneva	Stade de Genève	30,084
Sion U-21	Valais	Stade de Tourbillon	20,200
St. Gallen U-21	St. Gallen	Espenmoos or Kybunpark	3,000; 3,000
FC Stade Nyonnais	Vaud	Stade de Colovray	7,200
FC Tuggen	Schwyz	Linthstrasse	2,800
SC YF Juventus	Zürich	Utogrund	2,850
Zürich U-21	Zürich	Sportplatz Heerenschürli	1,120

== Final league table ==
Pos	Team	Pld	W	D	L	GF	GA	GD	Pts	Promotion, qualification or relegation
1	Servette FC (C, P)	30	20	6	4	61	26	+35	66	Promotion to Challenge League
2	SC Cham	30	16	8	6	72	48	+24	56	
3	SC Kriens	30	17	3	10	47	36	+11	54	
4	Basel U-21	30	15	5	10	65	52	+13	50	
5	BSC Old Boys Basel	30	15	4	11	60	49	+11	49	
6	FC Rapperswil-Jona	30	12	10	8	41	33	+8	46	
7	Stade Nyonnais	30	11	6	13	46	45	+1	39	
8	FC Breitenrain	30	9	12	9	48	49	−1	39	
9	SC Brühl	30	10	8	12	52	52	0	38	
10	SC Young Fellows Juventus	30	9	9	12	47	55	−8	36	
11	Zürich U-21	30	10	5	15	57	65	−8	35	
12	FC Tuggen	30	9	8	13	42	59	−17	35	
13	FC Köniz	30	8	10	12	49	52	−3	34	
14	Sion U-21	30	8	7	15	27	47	−20	31	
15	St. Gallen U-21 (R)	30	8	6	16	40	51	−11	30	Relegation to 1. Liga Classic
16	Étoile Carouge (R)	30	6	7	17	33	68	−35	25	Relegation to 1. Liga Classic

Source: RSSSF
Rules for classification: 1) Points; 2) Goal difference; 3) Goals scored; 4) Head-to-head points; 5) Away goals scored; 6) Draw.
(C) Champions; (P) Promoted; (R) Relegated

== Top goalscorers ==
The top goal scorers for the season:

Rank	Player	Club	Goals
1	Samel Sabanovic	SC Brühl	16
2	Severin Dätwyler	SC Cham	14
3	Altin Osmani	FC Köniz	12
3	Tibert Pont	Servette FC	12
3	Aldin Turkes	FC Zürich U-21	12

== Promotion round ==
The best eight teams of the three divisions of the 1. Liga Classic competed for three spots in the 2016–17 1. Liga Promotion:

Semi-finals

Team 1	Agg.	Team 2	1st leg	2nd leg
FC United Zürich (III/3)	2–2 (a)	FC Stade Lausanne-Ouchy (I/1)	0–0	2–2
FC Bavois (I/3)	3–1	FC Münsingen (II/1)	1–2	3–0
SR Delémont (II/2)	2–3	FC Baden (III/1)	1–1	1–2 (a.e.t.)
Grasshopper Club U-21 (III/2)	4–8	FC La Chaux-de-Fonds (I/2)	1–4	3–4

Finals

Team 1	Agg.	Team 2	1st leg	2nd leg
FC Bavois (I/3)	1-0	FC Baden (III/1)	0–0	1–0
FC La Chaux-de-Fonds (I/2)	3-1	FC United Zürich (III/3)	1–0	2–1

Decider for third promotion spot

Team 1	Score	Team 2
FC Baden (III/1)	0–2	FC United Zürich (III/3)

- (I/1) First number, the Roman numeral, indicates division, second number indicates final position in division.
