= Arian Kabashi =

Arian Kabashi may refer to:

- Arian Kabashi (footballer, born 1996), Swiss-born Kosovan football player
- Arian Kabashi (footballer, born 1997), Albanian football player active in Sweden
