= Miguel Rodrigues =

Miguel Rodrigues may refer to:

- Miguel Rodrigues (footballer, born 1993), Portuguese footballer
- Miguel Tavares Rodrigues (born 1993), Portuguese volleyball player
- Miguel Rodrigues (footballer, born 1996), Swiss footballer
