= Christian Zock =

Cameroonian footballer

Personal information
- Full name: Guy Christian Zock à Bep
- Date of birth: 6 May 1994 (age 32)
- Place of birth: Cameroon
- Height: 1.90 m (6 ft 3 in)
- Position: Midfielder

Team information
- Current team: Bavois
- Number: 5

Senior career*
| Years | Team | Apps | (Gls) |
| 2011–2013 | AS Fortuna | 40 | (17) |
| 2013–2016 | Cosmos de Bafia | 46 | (7) |
| 2016–2017 | Schaffhausen | 28 | (0) |
| 2017–2021 | Sion | 64 | (1) |
| 2021–2023 | Yverdon-Sport | 33 | (0) |
| 2024– | Bavois | 38 | (0) |

International career^{‡}
| 2015– | Cameroon | 6 | (0) |
- * Club domestic league appearances and goals as of 26 June 2026 ‡ National team caps and goals as of 19 June 2023

Guy Christian Zock à Bep (born 6 May 1994), better known as Christian Zock, is a Cameroonian professional footballer who plays as a midfielder for Swiss Promotion League club Bavois.

== Professional career ==
After beginning his career in Cameroon with AS Fortuna Mfou and Cosmos de Bafia, Zock moved to Switzerland with FC Schaffhausen in 2016. After a successful debut season, he moved to FC Sion on 15 June 2017 in the Swiss Super League. Zock made his professional debut for Sion in a 1-1 Swiss Super League tie with FC Lausanne-Sport on 27 September 2017.

On 27 August 2021, he signed with Yverdon-Sport.

== International career ==
Zock made his debut for the Cameroon national football team in a friendly 1–0 win over Indonesia on 25 March 2015.
