= 2018–19 Promotion League =

Swiss Promotion League
- Season: 2018–2019
- Champions: Stade Lausanne Ouchy
- Promoted: Stade Lausanne Ouchy
- Relegated: La Chaux-de-Fonds; Wohlen
- Matches played: 240
- Goals scored: 723 (3.01 per match)

The 2018–19 Promotion League season is the 7th edition (the 5th since its name change). The Promotion League is the third highest level in the Swiss football league system, behind the Super League and the Challenge League.

== Teams ==
The Championship was played by 16 teams, three of which were U-21 teams, and each team played 30 games in a double round robin. The championship winner would win promotion and the two bottom placed teams would be relegated. In the previous season SC Kriens had become division champions and had won promotion. FC United Zürich had ended the season in last position and were relegated and although FC La Chaux-de-Fonds had ended in second last position they held class, because BSC Old Boys Basel voluntarily relegated. Therefore, the 2018–19 season saw three new clubs join the division, AC Bellinzona and FC Münsingen had both been promoted from the 1. Liga Classic and FC Wohlen joined after suffering relegation from the 2017–18 Swiss Challenge League.

Club	Canton	Stadium	Capacity	2017-2018 season results
FC Wohlen	Aargau	Stadion Niedermatten	3,624	Relegated from 2017–18 Swiss Challenge League
FC Stade Nyonnais	Vaud	Stade de Colovray	7,200	2nd
Yverdon-Sport	Vaud	Stade Municipal	8,200	3rd
FC Basel U-21	Basel-City	Stadion Rankhof	7,000	4th
Lausanne-Ouchy	Vaud	Centre sportif de Vidy	2,000	5th
FC Zürich U-21	Zürich	Sportplatz Heerenschürli	1,120	6th
FC Köniz	Bern	Liebefeld	1,000	7th
SC Brühl	St. Gallen	Paul-Grüninger-Stadion	4,200	8th
FC Breitenrain Bern	Bern	Spitalacker	1,450	9th
FC Sion U-21	Valais	Stade de Tourbillon	20,200	10th
SC Cham	Zug	Stadion Eizmoos	1,800	11th
SC YF Juventus	Zürich	Utogrund	2,850	12th
FC Bavois	Vaud	Terrain des Peupliers	659	13th
FC La Chaux-de-Fonds	Neuchâtel	Stade de la Charrière	12,700	15th
AC Bellinzona	Ticino	Stadio Comunale Bellinzona	5,000	Promoted from 1. Liga
FC Münsingen	Bern	Sportanlage Sandreutenen	1,400	Promoted from 1. Liga

== Final league table ==
Pos	Team	Pld	W	D	L	GF	GA	GD	Pts	Qualification or relegation
1	Stade Lausanne Ouchy	30	21	6	3	74	28	+46	69	Promotion to 2019–20 Challenge League
2	Yverdon-Sport	30	17	9	4	55	22	+33	60	
3	Bellinzona	30	16	10	4	49	23	+26	58	
4	SC Cham	30	14	8	8	52	40	+12	50	
5	Sion U-21	30	13	6	11	41	38	+3	45	
6	Stade Nyonnais	30	13	4	13	56	36	+20	43	
7	Köniz	30	10	11	9	41	46	−5	41	
8	Bavois	30	9	13	8	48	43	+5	40	
9	Basel U-21	30	9	11	10	49	43	+6	38	
10	Breitenrain	30	11	5	14	44	54	−10	38	
11	Münsingen	30	9	10	11	29	44	−15	37	
12	Brühl	30	9	9	12	53	55	−2	36	
13	Zürich U-21	30	8	9	13	32	44	−12	33	
14	YF Juventus	30	9	2	19	35	54	−19	29	
15	Wohlen	30	6	10	14	40	58	−18	28	Relegation to 2. Liga Interregional
16	La Chaux-de-Fonds	30	2	5	23	25	95	−70	11	Relegation to 2. Liga Interregional

Source: RSSSF
Rules for classification: 1) Points; 2) Goal difference; 3) Goals scored; 4) Head-to-head points; 5) Away goals scored; 6) The draw.

== Sources ==
- Switzerland 2018/19 at RSSSF
