= 2014–15 Promotion League =

Promotion League
- Season: 2014–15
- Champions: Neuchâtel Xamax
- Promoted: Neuchâtel Xamax
- Relegated: FC Locarno; SR Delémont

The 2014–15 Promotion League season is the third season of this league which had previously been called 1. Liga Promotion prior to this season but now underwent a name change. The Promotion League is the third highest level in the Swiss football league system, behind the Super League and the Challenge League.

The season started in August 2014 and was concluded on 28 May 2015. The league was won by Neuchâtel Xamax who was promoted to the Challenge League while FC Locarno and SR Delémont were relegated to the 1. Liga Classic.

== Teams ==
In the previous season FC Le Mont had been division champions and were promoted to the 2014–15 Challenge League. SC Kriens and AC Bellinzona had ended the season in the two last positions and were therefore relegated. Thus the 2014–15 season saw three new clubs join the division, FC Rapperswil-Jona and Neuchâtel Xamax, had both been promoted from the 1. Liga Classic, while FC Locarno had suffered relegation from the Challenge League.

Club	Canton	Stadium	Capacity
Basel U-21	Basel-City	Stadion Rankhof or Youth Campus Basel	7,000; 1,000
FC Breitenrain Bern	Bern	Spitalacker	1,450
SC Brühl	St. Gallen	Paul-Grüninger-Stadion	4,200
SR Delémont	Jura	La Blancherie	5,263
Étoile Carouge FC	Geneva	Stade de la Fontenette	3,690
FC Köniz	Bern	Sportplatz Liebefeld-Hessgut	2,600
FC Locarno	Ticino	Stadio del Lido	5,000
Neuchâtel Xamax	Neuchâtel	Stade de la Maladière	1,200
BSC Old Boys	Basel-City	Stadion Schützenmatte	8,000
FC Rapperswil-Jona	St. Gallen	Stadion Grünfeld	2,500
Sion U-21	Valais	Stade de Tourbillon	20,200
St. Gallen U-21	St. Gallen	Espenmoos or Kybunpark	3,000; 19,264
FC Stade Nyonnais	Vaud	Stade de Colovray	7,200
FC Tuggen	Schwyz	Linthstrasse	2,800
SC YF Juventus	Zürich	Utogrund	2,850
Zürich U-21	Zürich	Sportplatz Heerenschürli	1,120

== Final league table ==
Pos	Team	Pld	W	D	L	GF	GA	GD	Pts	Promotion, qualification or relegation
1	Neuchâtel Xamax (C, P)	30	22	4	4	79	31	+48	70	Promotion to Challenge League
2	FC Köniz	30	17	6	7	60	34	+26	57	
3	FC Breitenrain Bern	30	13	10	7	50	40	+10	49	
4	SC Young Fellows Juventus	30	13	8	9	54	52	+2	47	
5	Sion U-21	30	13	5	12	51	50	+1	44	
6	FC Rapperswil-Jona	30	13	5	12	46	48	−2	44	
7	Étoile Carouge	30	12	7	11	41	39	+2	43	
8	Zürich U-21	30	13	4	13	48	50	−2	43	
9	Stade Nyonnais	30	12	6	12	39	37	+2	42	
10	St. Gallen U-21	30	12	5	13	52	51	+1	41	
11	Basel U-21	30	12	4	14	57	55	+2	40	
12	FC Tuggen	30	11	2	17	41	64	−23	35	
13	SC Brühl	30	10	3	17	45	64	−19	33	
14	BSC Old Boys Basel	30	8	7	15	42	52	−10	31	
15	FC Locarno (R)	30	8	5	17	38	54	−16	29	Relegation to 1. Liga Classic
16	SR Delémont (R)	30	6	9	15	42	64	−22	27	Relegation to 1. Liga Classic

Source: RSSSF
Rules for classification: 1) Points; 2) Goal difference; 3) Goals scored; 4) Head-to-head points; 5) Away goals scored; 6) Draw.
(C) Champions; (P) Promoted; (R) Relegated

== 1. Liga Classic promotion round ==
The best eight teams of the three divisions of the 1. Liga Classic competed for two spots in the 2016–17 1. Liga Promotion:

Semi-finals

Team 1	Agg.	Team 2	1st leg	2nd leg
Zug 94 (II/3)	2–2 (a)	FC Wettswiel-Bonstetten (III/1)	2–2	0–0
FC Gossau (III/2)	3–4	FC Stade Lausanne-Ouchy (I/1)	1–1	2–3
Yverdon Sport (I/2)	2–8	SC Kriens (II/2)	1–6	1–2
FC Baden (III/3)	4–8	SC Cham (II/1)	0–4	0–5

Finals

Team 1	Agg.	Team 2	1st leg	2nd leg
FC Stade Lausanne-Ouchy (I/1)	2–3	SC Kriens (II/2)	2–2	0–1
FC Wettswiel-Bonstetten (III/1)	3–7	SC Cham (II/1)	2–5	1–2

- (I/1) First number, the Roman numeral, indicates division, second number indicates final position in division.
