= 2016–17 Promotion League =

Promotion League
- Season: 2016–17
- Champions: FC Rapperswil-Jona
- Promoted: FC Rapperswil-Jona
- Relegated: FC Tuggen
- Matches played: 240
- Goals scored: 767 (3.2 per match)
- Top goalscorer: (Brazil) Mychell Ruan Silva

The 2016–17 Promotion League season is the fifth season of this league. It had previously been called 1. Liga Promotion but underwent a name change before in 2014. The Promotion League is the third highest tier in the Swiss football league system, behind the Super League and the Challenge League.

The season started on 3 August 2016 and finished on 27 May 2017. The league was won by FC Rapperswil-Jona while FC Tuggen were relegated to the 1. Liga.

== Teams ==
=== Stadia and locations ===
Location of the 2016–17 1. Liga Promotion teams

The 2016–17 season saw three new clubs in the league, FC La Chaux-de-Fonds, FC Bavois and FC United Zürich who were all promoted from the 1. Liga Classic. No club was relegated from the Challenge League as FC Biel-Bienne was stripped of their league licence by the Swiss Football Association and subsequently declared bankrupt.

Club	Location	Stadium	2015/16 Position
Basel U-21	Basel	Youth Campus Basel	4th in Promotion League
FC Bavois	Bavois	Stade des Peupliers	3rd in 1. Liga Classic Group 1
FC Breitenrain	Bern	Spitalacker	8th in Promotion League
SC Brühl	St. Gallen	Paul-Grüninger-Stadion	9th in Promotion League
SC Cham	Cham	Stadion Eizmoos	2nd in Promotion League
FC Köniz	Köniz	Sportplatz Liebefeld	13th in Promotion League
SC Kriens	Kriens	Stadion Kleinfeld	3rd in Promotion League
FC La Chaux-de-Fonds	La Chaux-de-Fonds	Stade Charrière	2nd in 1. Liga Classic Group 1
BSC Old Boys Basel	Basel	Stadion Schützenmatte	5th in Promotion League
FC Rapperswil-Jona	Rapperswil	Stadion Grünfeld	6th in Promotion League
Sion U-21	Sion	Stade Tourbillon	14th in Promotion League
FC Stade Nyonnais	Nyon	Centre sportif de Colovray	7th in Promotion League
FC Tuggen	Tuggen	Linthstrasse	12th in Promotion League
FC United Zürich	Zürich	Sportanlage Buchlern	3rd in 1. Liga Classic Group 3
SC Young Fellows Juventus	Zürich	Utogrund	10th in Promotion League
Zürich U-21	Zürich	Sportanlage Heerenschürli	11th in Promotion League

== Final league table ==
Pos	Team	Pld	W	D	L	GF	GA	GD	Pts	Promotion, qualification or relegation
1	FC Rapperswil-Jona	30	18	8	4	60	29	+31	62	Swiss Promotion League Champion; Promotion to Challenge League
2	SC Kriens	30	17	6	7	65	31	+34	57	
3	Basel U-21	30	16	7	7	64	37	+27	55	
4	FC Stade Nyonnais	30	14	7	9	51	39	+12	49	
5	Zürich U-21	30	13	9	8	54	52	+2	48	
6	FC Breitenrain	30	13	6	11	46	49	−3	45	
7	SC Brühl	30	11	7	12	56	54	+2	40	
8	FC Köniz	30	11	7	12	40	43	−3	40	
9	FC La Chaux-de-Fonds (P)	30	10	9	11	44	46	−2	39	
10	Sion U-21	30	11	6	13	48	58	−10	39	
11	SC Cham	30	9	10	11	47	46	+1	37	
12	BSC Old Boys Basel	30	9	7	14	47	48	−1	34	
13	SC Young Fellows Juventus	30	8	9	13	44	53	−9	33	
14	FC Bavois (P)	30	8	7	15	37	69	−32	31	
15	FC United Zürich (P)	30	8	3	19	32	61	−29	27	
16	FC Tuggen	30	6	8	16	37	57	−20	26	Relegation to 2017–18 1. Liga Classic

Source: Switzerland 2016/17 at RSSSF
Rules for classification: 1) Points; 2) Goal difference; 3) Goals scored; 4) Head-to-head points; 5) Away goals scored; 6) Draw.
(P) Promoted

== Season statistics ==
=== Top scorers ===
Rank	Player	Club	Goals
1	(Brazil) Mychell Ruan Silva	FC Rapperswil-Jona	22
2	(Switzerland) Nico Siegrist	SC Kriens	17
3	(Switzerland) Anto Franjic	FC Breitenrain	15
3	(Switzerland) Shpetim Sulejmani	FC Zürich U-21	15
5	(North Macedonia) Skumbim Sulejmani	SC Kriens	14
6	(Switzerland) Marco Colocci	SC Young Fellows Juventus	13
6	(Switzerland) Severin Dätwyler	SC Cham	13
6	(Switzerland) Qendrim Makshana	FC Bavois	13
9	(Switzerland) Roman Herger	SC Cham	11
9	(Switzerland) Neftali Manzambi	FC Basel U-21	11
9	(Montenegro) Samel Šabanović	SC Brühl	11
