= 2015–16 Swiss 1. Liga =

Swiss 1. Liga
- Season: 2015–16
- Champions: FC Stade Lausanne-Ouchy; FC Münsingen; FC Baden
- Promoted: FC Bavois; FC La Chaux-de-Fonds; FC United Zürich
- Relegated: US Terre Sainte; Signal FC Bernex-Confignon; FC Sursee; FC Bern; FC Dietikon; FC Kosova Zürich

The 2015–16 season of the Swiss 1. Liga was the 94th season of the fourth tier of the Swiss football league system.

== Tables ==
=== Group 1 ===
Pos	Team	Pld	W	D	L	GF	GA	GD	Pts	Promotion, qualification or relegation
1	FC Stade Lausanne-Ouchy (C)	26	16	5	5	47	24	+23	53	Qualification to Promotion play-offs
2	FC La Chaux-de-Fonds (P)	26	14	6	6	59	26	+33	48	Qualification to Promotion play-offs
3	FC Bavois (P)	26	13	6	7	62	44	+18	45	Qualification to Promotion play-offs
4	FC Azzurri 90	26	11	8	7	50	31	+19	41	
5	Yverdon Sport FC	26	10	8	8	37	34	+3	38	
6	Grand-Lancy FC	26	9	11	6	31	32	−1	38	
7	FC Fribourg	26	8	10	8	42	34	+8	34	
8	SC Düdingen	26	9	6	11	48	46	+2	33	
9	FC Naters	26	8	9	9	42	43	−1	33	
10	FC Martigny-Sports	26	10	3	13	33	51	−18	33	
11	FC Echallens	26	9	5	12	32	58	−26	32	
12	Team Vaud U21	26	9	2	15	41	42	−1	29	
13	US Terre Sainte (R)	26	7	5	14	40	54	−14	26	Relegation to 2. Liga Interregional
14	Signal FC Bernex-Confignon (R)	26	6	2	18	27	72	−45	20	Relegation to 2. Liga Interregional

Rules for classification: 1) Points; 2) Goal Difference
(C) Champions; (P) Promoted; (R) Relegated

=== Group 2 ===
Pos	Team	Pld	W	D	L	GF	GA	GD	Pts	Promotion, qualification or relegation
1	FC Münsingen (C)	26	15	7	4	50	30	+20	52	Qualification to Promotion play-offs
2	SR Delémont	26	14	4	8	46	36	+10	46	Qualification to Promotion play-offs
3	FC Luzern II	26	13	5	8	51	30	+21	44	
4	FC Black Stars Basel	26	13	3	10	48	36	+12	42	
5	BSC Young Boys II	26	11	8	7	51	33	+18	41	
6	FC Solothurn	26	10	10	6	39	33	+6	40	
7	SC Buochs	26	10	6	10	46	46	0	36	
8	Zug 94	26	9	8	9	39	36	+3	35	
9	FC Schötz	26	10	4	12	44	50	−6	34	
10	FC Thun II	26	9	6	11	50	50	0	33	
11	FC Wangen bei Olten	26	8	6	12	33	44	−11	30	
12	FC Muri	26	8	5	13	37	52	−15	29	
13	FC Sursee (R)	26	8	5	13	36	56	−20	29	Relegation to 2. Liga Interregional
14	FC Bern (R)	26	3	5	18	17	55	−38	14	Relegation to 2. Liga Interregional

Rules for classification: 1) Points; 2) Goal Difference
(C) Champions; (R) Relegated

=== Group 3 ===
Pos	Team	Pld	W	D	L	GF	GA	GD	Pts	Promotion, qualification or relegation
1	FC Baden (C)	26	16	3	7	58	36	+22	51	Qualification to Promotion play-offs
2	Grasshopper Club Zürich II	26	13	9	4	49	33	+16	48	Qualification to Promotion play-offs
3	FC United Zürich (P)	26	13	7	6	46	33	+13	46	Qualification to Promotion play-offs
4	FC Winterthur II	26	11	5	10	41	33	+8	38	
5	FC Gossau	26	10	7	9	45	46	−1	37	
6	FC Locarno	26	9	9	8	34	30	+4	36	
7	FC Mendrisio-Stabio	26	8	11	7	42	30	+12	35	
8	FC Thalwil	26	9	8	9	34	41	−7	35	
9	FC Seuzach	26	9	6	11	45	49	−4	33	
10	FC Wettswil-Bonstetten	26	7	9	10	37	43	−6	30	
11	(Liechtenstein) USV Eschen/Mauren	26	7	8	11	41	43	−2	29	
12	(Liechtenstein) FC Balzers	26	8	5	13	33	43	−10	29	
13	FC Dietikon (R)	27	7	6	14	35	59	−24	27	Relegation to 2. Liga Interregional
14	FC Kosova Zürich (R)	26	6	6	14	33	54	−21	24	Relegation to 2. Liga Interregional

Rules for classification: 1) Points; 2) Goal Difference
(C) Champions; (P) Promoted; (R) Relegated

== Promotion play-offs ==
Semi-Finals
FC Bavois	1	3	4
FC Münsingen	2	0	2
SR Delémont	1	1	2
FC Baden	1	2	3
Grasshopper Club Zürich II	1	3	4
FC La Chaux-de-Fonds	4	4	8
FC United Zürich	0	2	2
FC Stade Lausanne-Ouchy	0	2	2

Finals
FC Bavois	0	1	1
FC Baden	0	0	0
FC La Chaux-de-Fonds	1	2	3
FC United Zürich	0	1	1

FC Bavois and FC La Chaux-de-Fonds were promoted to the 2016–17 1. Liga Promotion.

Following FC Biel-Bienne's bankruptcy and expulsion from the Swiss Challenge League a third promotion spot was available, to be decided by a single match between the losers of the two Play-off Finals.

Team 1	Score	Team 2
FC Baden	0–2	FC United Zürich

FC United Zürich were promoted to the 2016–17 1. Liga Promotion.
