= Safet Alic =

Bosnian football midfielder (born 1999)

Personal information
- Date of birth: 4 February 1999 (age 27)
- Place of birth: Sarajevo, Bosnia and Herzegovina
- Height: 1.85 m (6 ft 1 in)
- Position: Midfielder

Team information
- Current team: Biel-Bienne
- Number: 4

Senior career*
Years	Team	Apps	(Gls)
2017–2020	Neuchâtel Xamax	38	(5)
2018–2019	→ Bavois (loan)	37	(0)
2020–2021	Yverdon Sport	13	(1)
2021–	Biel-Bienne	86	(4)
- * Club domestic league appearances and goals as of 22 June 2026

Safet Alic (born 4 February 1999) is a Swiss football midfielder of Bosnian descent who plays for Biel-Bienne.

== Club career ==
Alic made his professional debut for Neuchâtel Xamax in a 3-0 Swiss Super League loss to FC Basel on 24 August 2019. He joined Yverdon Sport in August 2020.
