= Thomas Weller =

German footballer (born 1980)

Personal information
- Full name: Thomas Christian Weller
- Date of birth: 4 November 1980 (age 45)
- Height: 1.85 m (6 ft 1 in)
- Positions: Left midfielder; left-back

Youth career
- 1860 Munich

Senior career*
Years	Team	Apps	(Gls)
2000–2001	1860 Munich II	17	(0)
2002–2004	FC Winterthur	48	(8)
2004–2005	FC Vaduz	30	(5)
2005–2006	FC Schaffhausen	37	(3)
2007	Stuttgarter Kickers	11	(0)
2007–2009	St. Gallen	42	(4)
2009–2011	FC Schaffhausen	53	(8)
2011–2013	FC Wohlen	27	(3)
2013–2014	SC Pfullendorf	33	(5)
2014–2015	SC Brühl	16	(0)
2015–2017	FC United Zürich	55	(13)
2017–2018	FC Kosova Zürich	24	(2)
2018	FC Tuggen	6	(3)
2018–2020	FC Kosova Zürich		
2020–2021	FC Uster		
2022–	FC Romanshorn		
- * Club domestic league appearances and goals as of 23:34, 21 December 2019 (UTC)

Thomas Christian Weller (born 4 November 1980) is a German former professional footballer who plays as a left midfielder or left-back for FC Romanshorn.

== Career ==
Weller joined FC St. Gallen on 24 October 2007.

He moved to SC Brühl in 2014 to FC United Zürich in 2015, and to FC Kosova Zürich in 2017. He continued his career in the Swiss lower leagues with FC Uster and FC Romanshorn.

== Personal ==
His father Hanjo Weller previously worked as Head Scout by FC Vaduz.
