= Kabashi =

Region in Albania; historic Albanian tribe

The Kabashi (the definite form of Kabash) are an Albanian tribe, or fis, from the Pukë region. It is considered part of the "seven tribes of Puka" (Albanian: shtatë bajrakët e Pukës) that inhabit the region. Durham said of them: "Puka group ... sometimes reckoned a large tribe of seven bairaks. Sometimes as a group of tribes".

== Geography ==
Kabashi tribal territory is situated on the left (southern) side of the Drin River. Kabashi territory borders the Qerreti and Puka tribes to the west, the Berisha tribe to the north, the Spaçi tribe of Mirdita to the south, the Thaçi tribe to the east and the Dushmani tribe to the northwest, across the Drin River. Kabashi tribal territory is centred on the Gomina river basin, which flows into the Drin, and the Kabashi settlements consist of Qelëza, Kabash, Bushat, Dedaj, Micoj, Ukth, Kryezi and Meçja.

== Origins and history ==
The traces of the term 'Kabashi' can be found in Stratioti documents as Cabassi or Cambassi in 1530 and 1541 respectively. An Antonio Cabazi lived in Lezhë in 1582, and a Luca Kabashi served as the parish priest of the Gashi in 1671. It appears in the form Cabassi in an ecclesiastical report of 1621 by Giezzi Bianco, and then Gabasu in 1688, which was a wooden mountain fortress consisting of 200 homes and was labelled on a map by the Venetian cartographer Francesco Maria Coronelli. In 1669, it was styled as Kabasci by Italian cartographer Giacomo Cantelli da Vignola, and in another map by Coronelli in 1691 as Kabasi. The Catholic archbishop of Tivar in 1703 titled them as Cabasci.

It is said that the Kabashi emigrated northwards as early as 1500 from their original territory of Kaloja, somewhere in southern Albanian-inhabited territories - it was said that Kaloja was in Janina of modern Greece, but it could also be Kolonja of southern Albania due to the existence of a Kabashi toponym there. A possible path of immigration from the south can be traced through the existence of a Kabashi vëllazëri in Gramsh, Elbasan, and another in Kruma. Baron Nopsca dates their arrival to the Puka region to sometime before 1600 as the Dushmani and Qerreti tribes were encountered upon their arrival. Traditionally composed of four leading families formed from four brothers - the Kokaj from Koka Leka, the Qafaliaj from Qafa Leka, the Hadroj from Hadro Leka and the Lushaj from Lusha Leka - which were settled in different parts of today's Kabash territory.

Around Qelëza, there was a group of the same name present that was made of the native Pervoci family - who lived around the Church of St. Paul in the village - and the families of four shepherds who arrived from Kçira at around 1450.

From the late 15th century onwards, the Kabashi tribe had converted to Islam and were in conflict with the Catholic Berisha tribe. According to legend, Koka - the eldest of the four previously mentioned ancestral brothers of the Kabashi tribe - was infuriated by Hadro's (the youngest brother) decision to convert to Islam. Hadro and his family attempted to leave for Kosovo out of fear of Koka, who would eventually shoot Hadro dead at the Vizier's Bridge over the Drin. The tribe reacted negatively to this event and passed the leadership of the tribe onto Qafa Leka, whose family would later convert to Islam anyways.

The Kabashi tribe have traditionally had two bajraks - the original Kabashi (with the Manusi, a house of indigenous Albanian anas families), and Tërthorja. The Qerreti tribe, who are also from Puka, are closely related to the Kabashi tribe.

== Religion ==
The Kabashi tribe have an archaeological history for both Christianity and Islam - their main churches were those dedicated to Saint John the Baptist, Saint Peter, Saint Nicholas, Saint Elijah, Saint Veneranda and Saint Jeremiah. Saint Paul served as the patron saint of the region, and in Grykë-Kabash, there was a Benedictine abbey of Saint Paul which possibly dated to the mid 14th century. The Kabashi tribe are said to be the first northern Albanian tribe to have converted to Islam, and this Islamisation occurred in the 17th century. The main Kabashi mosque dates to the mid 19th century. In 1930, the Kabashi were mentioned as being two thirds Muslim and one third Catholic. Since at least 1889, the Kabashi tribe have traditionally observed a feast for St. Paul.

== Distribution ==
Members of the Kabashi tribe can be found in Albania and Kosovo. In 1940, there were 66 families in 8 villages of the Hasi region. A group of Kabashi emigrated to Prizren in 1736; the Russian consul of the time reported that their ancestors had arrived from the Janina region 400 years prior to his existence. As mentioned previously, there are Kabashi brotherhoods in Gramsh, Elbasan, and Kruma. Other brotherhoods stemming from the Kabashi tribe include the Leshaj of Hajmeli and those of Kotrri and Skarramana in Zadrima, and the Laçaj of Pukë. Some Kabashi families also live in Pult. There are many toponyms and names that traces their origin to the fis (tribe). Toponyms include the Kabashi Mountains chain in Kosovo and Kabash in the Vitina municipality of southeast Kosovo.

== People with the name ==
Notable people with surnames originating from the clan include:

- Besim Kabashi (1976–2011), Kosovan–German kickboxer
- Mirush Kabashi (born 1948), Albanian actor
- Elvis Kabashi (born 1994), football player, has appeared with Albania U-21
- Arian Kabashi (footballer, born 1996), Kosovan football player
- Arian Kabashi (footballer, born 1997), Albanian football player
- Hil Kabashi (born 1941), Albanian Roman Catholic bishop
- Luan Kabashi (born 2012), Swedish aoc2 Gamer
