= 2017–18 Swiss Challenge League =

Season of a football competition

Swiss Challenge League
- Season: 2017–18
- Champions: Neuchatel Xamax
- Promoted: Neuchatel Xamax
- Relegated: Wohlen
- Europa League: Vaduz
- Matches: 360
- Goals: 86 (0.24 per match)
- Biggest home win: Schaffhausen 6–0 Rapperswil-Jona (24 July 2017)
- Biggest away win: Wohlen 1–4 Schaffhausen (31 July 2017)
- Highest scoring: Schaffhausen 6–0 Rapperswil-Jona (24 July 2017)
- Longest winning run: Schaffhausen (6 games)
- Longest unbeaten run: Neuchâtel Xamax (21 games)
- Longest winless run: Aarau (6 games)
- Longest losing run: Wohlen (4 games)
- All statistics correct as of 21 July 2018.

The 2017–18 Swiss Challenge League (referred to as the Brack.ch Challenge League for sponsoring reasons) is the 15th season of the Swiss Challenge League, the second tier of competitive football in Switzerland, under its current name. The season started on 21 July 2017 and is scheduled to end on 21 May 2018. The winter break began on 11 December 2017 and the league resumed on 2 February 2018.

== Participating teams ==
A total of 10 teams participate in the league. 2016–17 Swiss Challenge League champions Zürich were promoted to the 2017–18 Swiss Super League. They were replaced by FC Vaduz, who got relegated after finishing last-placed in the 2016–17 Swiss Super League. Le Mont was relegated after failing to renew their licence. They were replaced by Rapperswil-Jona, who won promotion from the 2016–17 Swiss Promotion League.

=== Stadia and locations ===
Locations of clubs in the 2017–18 Challenge League

Team	Location	Stadium	Capacity
Aarau	Aarau	Stadion Brügglifeld	8,000
Chiasso	Chiasso	Stadio Comunale Riva IV	5,000
Neuchâtel Xamax	Neuchâtel	Stade de la Maladière	12,000
Rapperswil-Jona	Rapperswil-Jona	Stadion Grünfeld	2,500
Servette	Geneva	Stade de Genève	30,084
Schaffhausen	Schaffhausen	Stadion Breite; LIPO Park Schaffhausen	4,200; 8,200
Vaduz	(Liechtenstein) Vaduz	Rheinpark Stadion	7,584
Wil	Wil	IGP Arena	6,958
Winterthur	Winterthur	Schützenwiese	8,550
Wohlen	Wohlen	Stadion Niedermatten	3,624

=== Personnel ===
Team	Manager
Aarau	(Switzerland) Stephan Keller (caretaker)
Chiasso	(Italy) Baldassarre Raineri
Neuchâtel Xamax	(Switzerland) Michel Decastel
Rapperswil-Jona	(Switzerland) Urs Meier
Schaffhausen	(Switzerland) Boris Smiljanić
Servette	(Switzerland) Bojan Dimic
(Liechtenstein) Vaduz	(Germany) Roland Vrabec
Wil	(Germany) Konrad Fünfstück
Winterthur	(Switzerland) Livio Bordoli
Wohlen	(Bosnia and Herzegovina) Ranko Jakovljević

=== Managerial changes ===
Club	Name	Manner of departure	Date of departure	Position in table	Replacement	Date of appointment
Wil	(Italy) Maurizio Jacobacci	Resign	4 June 2017	Pre-season	(Germany) Konrad Fünfstück	18 June 2017
Aarau	(Switzerland) Marco Schällibaum	Mutual Consent	6 June 2017	Pre-season	(Switzerland) Marinko Jurendic	7 June 2017
Chiasso	(Italy) Baldo Raineri	Sacked	6 June 2017	Pre-season	(Spain) Guillermo Abascal	12 June 2017
Wohlen	(Italy) Francesco Gabriele	Mutual Consent	15 June 2017	Pre-season	(Bosnia and Herzegovina) Ranko Jakovljević	15 June 2017
Schaffhausen	(Switzerland) Murat Yakin	Signed by Grasshopper	28 August 2017	1st	(Switzerland) Boris Smiljanić	28 August 2017
Winterthur	(Switzerland) Umberto Romano	Sacked	3 January 2018	9th	(Switzerland) Livio Bordoli	3 January 2018
Servette	(Bosnia and Herzegovina) Meho Kodro	Sacked	3 March 2018	5th	(Switzerland) Bojan Dimic	3 March 2018
Aarau	(Switzerland) Marinko Jurendic	Sacked	21 March 2018	6th	(Switzerland) Stephan Keller (interim)	22 March 2018
Chiasso	(Spain) Guillermo Abascal	Sacked	3 April 2018	8th	(Italy) Baldassarre Raineri	3 April 2018

== League table ==
Pos	Team	Pld	W	D	L	GF	GA	GD	Pts	Promotion or relegation
1	Neuchâtel Xamax (C, P)	36	26	7	3	82	39	+43	85	Promotion to 2018–19 Swiss Super League
2	Schaffhausen	36	21	1	14	70	51	+19	64	
3	Servette	36	17	11	8	56	38	+18	62	
4	Vaduz (Note: Vaduz qualified for the 2018–19 UEFA Europa League as winners of the 2017–18 Liechtenstein Cup.)	36	16	11	9	66	50	+16	59	Qualification for the Europa League first qualifying round
5	Rapperswil-Jona	36	16	8	12	53	45	+8	56	
6	Aarau	36	12	8	16	53	62	−9	44	
7	Wil	36	9	12	15	40	50	−10	39	
8	Chiasso (Note: Chiasso were deducted three points for licence rules violation)	36	11	6	19	42	60	−18	36	
9	Winterthur	36	7	11	18	45	60	−15	32	
10	Wohlen (Note: Wohlen waived license application and will not continue professional football in the 2018–19 season.) (R)	36	3	9	24	41	93	−52	18	Relegation to 2018-19 Swiss Promotion League

Source: Swiss Challenge League
Rules for classification: 1) Points; 2) Goal difference; 3) Goals scored; 4) Head-to-head goal difference; 5) Away goals scored; 6) Draw.
(C) Champions; (P) Promoted; (R) Relegated

== Results ==
=== First and Second Round ===
Home \ Away	AAR	CHI	NEU	RAP	SHA	SER	VAD	WIL	WIN	WOH
Aarau	—	3–0	2–0	0–0	1–2	0–0	0–2	2–2	3–3	2–0
Chiasso	1–0	—	0–2	1–0	2–1	1–2	0–1	3–0	1–1	4–0
Neuchâtel Xamax	2–1	4–1	—	2–0	0–1	3–2	3–1	3–1	2–1	4–2
Rapperswil-Jona	2–0	1–1	2–2	—	5–0	0–1	2–0	0–0	3–1	3–2
Schaffhausen	4–1	2–0	1–2	6–0	—	1–2	3–1	2–1	2–0	2–1
Servette	3–0	2–2	1–2	2–1	3–2	—	2–0	1–0	1–1	5–1
Vaduz	4–1	1–0	0–5	2–2	2–0	1–1	—	0–0	2–2	1–1
Wil	1–3	2–3	0–1	1–0	2–3	0–0	0–1	—	0–2	3–1
Winterthur	1–1	1–1	0–1	0–1	0–1	0–2	0–1	2–0	—	1–3
Wohlen	1–1	1–1	1–2	1–2	1–4	0–2	1–0	2–2	3–2	—

Source: Swiss Super League (in German)
Legend: Blue = home team win; Yellow = draw; Red = away team win.

=== Third and Fourth Round ===
Home \ Away	AAR	CHI	NEU	RAP	SHA	SER	VAD	WIL	WIN	WOH
Aarau	—	4–1	2–2	0–1	2–1	1–2	4–1	2–2	2–1	4–2
Chiasso	0–2	—	0–3	0–1	2–0	2–1	1–6	0–1	1–0	3–0
Neuchâtel Xamax	3–1	1–0	—	1–0	1–0	1–1	3–1	6–3	3–3	4–1
Rapperswil-Jona	2–3	3–1	0–1	—	3–1	2–0	1–2	1–1	3–1	2–2
Schaffhausen	3–1	2–1	1–0	2–4	—	0–1	3–3	1–2	3–1	4–0
Servette	4–0	1–1	0–0	0–3	1–4	—	0–1	1–1	4–2	1–1
Vaduz	5–1	5–2	3–3	4–0	2–0	2–1	—	2–2	1–1	5–1
Wil	1–0	1–0	2–3	2–0	0–1	0–2	1–1	—	2–0	1–1
Winterthur	2–0	2–1	4–4	1–1	1–2	1–1	1–0	0–3	—	2–0
Wohlen	1–3	3–4	0–3	1–2	2–5	1–3	2–2	0–0	1–4	—

Source: Swiss Super League (in German)
Legend: Blue = home team win; Yellow = draw; Red = away team win.

== Season statistics ==
=== Top goalscorers ===
Rank	Player	Club	Goals
1	(Switzerland) Raphaël Nuzzolo	Neuchâtel	26
2	(Switzerland) Tunahan Cicek	Schaffhausen	21
3	(Switzerland) Hélios Sessolo	Schaffhausen	16
4	(Brazil) Mychell Chagas^{1}	Servette (6) / Rapperswil-Jona (9)	15
5	(Ukraine) Marko Dević	Vaduz	13

^{1}Chagas played 17 games for Rapperswil-Jona then signed for Servette.

== Awards ==
Swiss Football League Awards 2017
Award	Winner	Nationality	Club
Player of the Season	(Switzerland) Raphaël Nuzzolo	Switzerland	Neuchâtel Xamax FCS

Brack.ch Challenge League Dream Team 2017
Position	Player	Nationality	Club
Goalkeeper	Djordje Nikolić	Serbia	FC Thun
Defender	Anthony Sauthier	Switzerland	Servette FC
Defender	Mustafa Sejmenović	Bosnia and Herzegovina	Neuchâtel Xamax
Defender	Nathan	Brazil	Servette FC
Defender	William Le Pogam	France	Neuchâtel Xamax
Midfielder	Miroslav Stevanović	Bosnia and Herzegovina	Servette FC
Midfielder	Miguel Castroman	Switzerland	FC Aarau
Midfielder	Charles-André Doudin	Chad	Neuchâtel Xamax
Midfielder	Steven Lang	Switzerland	Servette FC
Forward	Raphaël Nuzzolo	Switzerland	Neuchâtel Xamax
Forward	Tunahan Çiçek	Turkey	FC Vaduz
