= Mirush Kabashi =

Albanian actor (1948–2023)

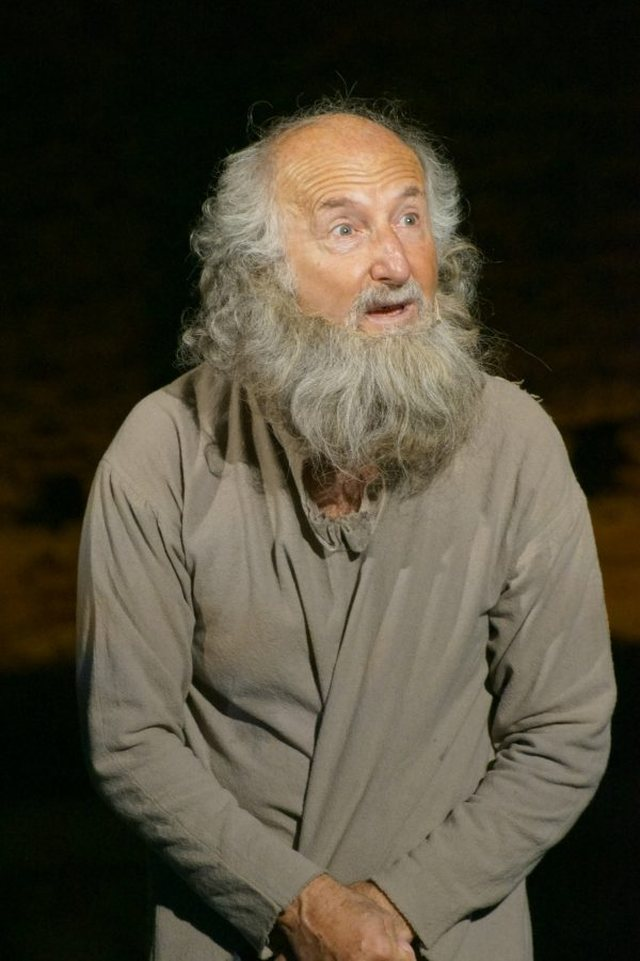
- Mirush Kabashi portraying Socrates
- Born: 17 April 1948; Shkodër, Albania
- Died: 5 December 2023 (aged 75); Tirana, Albania
- Occupation: Actor
- Years active: 1975–2014
- Children: 2
- Family: Kabashi
- Awards: People's Artist

Mirush Kabashi (17 April 1948 – 5 December 2023) was an Albanian actor. He has interpreted around 100 roles, in theater and cinema. He has often served as the host of numerous artistic events. His most important role is that of Socrates in the theatrical work Apologjia e vërtetë e Sokratit (Socrates' True Apology). Kabashi has also been considered one of the greatest poetry interpreters in Albania. He has made a significant contribution to Albanian cinema. His family belongs to the Kabashi tribe.

== Life ==
Mirush Kabashi was born on April 17, 1948, in Shkodër and was raised in Durrës. He originates from Gjakova. In 1970, he graduated in acting from the Academy of Arts in Tirana and began working at the Aleksandër Moisiu Theatre in Durrës. He remained there until 1994, serving as its director from 1991 to 1993. In 1974, he left the theater due to biographical reasons and worked as a laborer at the Railway Enterprise. In 1976, he returned to the Durrës Theater. From 2002, he joined the Artistic Troupe of the National Theater in Tirana as an Actor, where he remained until his retirement in March 2014.

In January 1971, he began working as an actor at the “Aleksandër Moisiu” Theater. In 1974, he was removed from the theater due to political reasons and worked as a laborer at the Railway Enterprise. In 1976, he returned to the Durrës Theater, where he remained until the end of 1993. In 1985, for several years, he was also active as an external Professor of Acting Mastery at the Academy of Arts.

From 1991 to 1993, he served as the director of the “Aleksandër Moisiu” Theater. In 1993, he was forced to step down from the theater's leadership due to political reasons, a situation that echoed his earlier dismissal in 1974. He refused to implement the imposed reforms.

From January 1994 he was appointed to the National Albanian Radio and Television (RTVSH) as a Creator and Presenter of Artistic Television Programs. he worked as the main creator, screenwriter, and host of some of the most important artistic programs on Albanian Radio and Television.

In the New Year's Concerts

In the show “The Top 10 Athletes of the Country”

In the festival “Songs of the Season”

In the show “Kult Awards”

In the TV series “The Cheerful Saturday of a City”

In the TV series “Days of Albanian Humor”

In the TV series “Auto-Stop”, a competition-show aimed at preventing traffic accidents in Albania, and others.

He has also been a member of the Albanian Academy of Arts and Sciences.

In 1998, together with nine well-known artists from Albanian-speaking regions, he took part in the humanitarian concert tour Kosova, Cradle of Freedom.

This tour was organized to raise awareness about the tragedy in Kosovo and to collect funds to help children left homeless and without families throughout Kosovo. The tour, which lasted three months, covered sixteen countries and one hundred and fourteen cities, becoming one of the longest tours in Europe.

Stops included countries such as Italy, Germany, France, England, Denmark, Poland, Czech Republic, Turkey, Slovenia, and others.

Paradoxically, although he had requested unpaid leave from TVSH, where he had worked since 1994, as soon as he returned, he was suspended from work without any explanation. Thus, after a conscientious and charitable anti-war tour through the Albanian diaspora, in the same year Kabashi was awarded the title “Great Master of Work”, he remained unemployed.

But it was precisely during this time that Mirushi intensified his artistic activity. He held numerous poetic word concerts in Europe, including in Israel, Norway, Sweden, Denmark, Belgium, Germany, Luxembourg, Switzerland, the Czech Republic, Croatia, Slovenia, Montenegro, Turkey, North Macedonia, Greece, as well as in Canada and the United States.

In 2008, Mirushi could not be absent from the First Concert Celebrating the Declaration of Independence of Kosovo, organized in the stadium of Prishtina.

In front of fifty thousand spectators, he performed "I am Albanian, I am Kosovar" and poems like "Kosovar Poem," "Oh Albania," "The Girl of the Flag," and "The Albanian Language," delivering powerful emotions to the audience.

After the declaration of Kosovo’s independence, he would be regularly invited to dozens of activities in Kosovo, performing in stadiums in Prishtina, Peja, Prizren, and Gjakova.

Many accolades would follow, not only from the Albanian diaspora but also from broader audiences, highlighting his great impact on art and culture:

1999: For his commitment, both artistically and patriotically, for his extraordinary contribution to national culture, such as the humanitarian concert Homage to Kosovo. In Essen, Germany

2000: Certificate of Gratitude on the first anniversary of Kosovo’s liberation, from the Municipal Assembly of Gjakova

2004: Acknowledgment for his contribution and dedication during the Kosovo War, from the Association of War Invalids of the Kosovo Liberation Army

2008: Honor of the City of Gjakova, an award given in the city’s stadium in the presence of five thousand spectators, as recognition for his outstanding contribution to art and culture

2019: Honorary Citizen of Gjakova, with the motivation: “For you who brought Gjakova’s truth into the light”

In 1998, together with nine well-known artists from Albanian-speaking regions, he took part in the humanitarian concert tour Kosova, Cradle of Freedom.

This tour was organized to raise awareness about the tragedy in Kosovo and to collect funds to help children left homeless and without families throughout Kosovo. The tour, which lasted three months, covered sixteen countries and one hundred and fourteen cities, becoming one of the longest tours in Europe.

Stops included countries such as Italy, Germany, France, England, Denmark, Poland, Czech Republic, Turkey, Slovenia, and others.

In 1994 Mirushi intensified his artistic activity. He held numerous poetic word concerts in Europe, including in Israel, Norway, Sweden, Denmark, Belgium, Germany, Luxembourg, Switzerland, the Czech Republic, Croatia, Slovenia, Montenegro, Turkey, North Macedonia, Greece, as well as in Canada and the United States.

In 2008, Mirushi could not be absent from the First Concert Celebrating the Declaration of Independence of Kosovo, organized in the stadium of Prishtina.

In front of fifty thousand spectators, he performed I am Albanian, I am Kosovar and poems like Kosovar Poem, Oh Albania, The Girl of the Flag, and The Albanian Language, delivering powerful emotions to the audience.

After the declaration of Kosovo’s independence, he would be regularly invited to dozens of activities in Kosovo, performing in stadiums in Prishtina, Peja, Prizren, and Gjakova.

Many accolades would follow, not only from the Albanian diaspora but also from broader audiences, highlighting his great impact on art and culture:

1999: For his commitment, both artistically and patriotically, for his extraordinary contribution to national culture, such as the humanitarian concert Homage to Kosovo. In Essen, Germany

2000: Certificate of Gratitude on the first anniversary of Kosovo’s liberation, from the Municipal Assembly of Gjakova

2004: Acknowledgment for his contribution and dedication during the Kosovo War, from the Association of War Invalids of the Kosovo Liberation Army

2008: Honor of the City of Gjakova, an award given in the city’s stadium in the presence of five thousand spectators, as recognition for his outstanding contribution to art and culture

2019: Honorary Citizen of Gjakova, with the motivation: “For you who brought Gjakova’s truth into the light”

Mirush Kabashi brought to the stage for the first time in Albania the play “The True Apology of Socrates,” which is also the first monodrama in the history of the Albanian National Theatre. It is also the most highly acclaimed Albanian theatrical performance by international juries, critics, and mass media.

“The True Apology of Socrates” is the first and only Albanian play that has been performed at the United Nations Hall in Geneva, in front of representatives from 200 nationalities from all five continents of the world. Mirush Kabashi has represented Albania in some of the highest-level theatre festivals, on the most prestigious stages of the world's artistic metropolises, such as Paris (France), Vienna (Austria), London (England), Cairo (Egypt), Toronto (Canada), Milton (Canada), Kyiv (Ukraine), Athens (Greece), Belgrade (Serbia), Geneva (Switzerland) [in the Plenary Hall of the UN (Hall XX)], Lyon (France), Plovdiv (Bulgaria), Bonn (Germany), Bitola (North Macedonia), Kotor (Montenegro), and others.

Throughout his artistic career, which spanned a full 53 years, Mirush Kabashi was honored with over 100 awards and titles, including numerous international prizes, which made him the most acclaimed Albanian actor outside the Albanian territories.

Despite the serious illness that afflicted him for 6 years, Mirush Kabashi never gave up on art—for him, the stage was life, and the audience was his oxygen. His last artistic activity was at the "European Night" in Gjakova, on June 17, 2023.

During his long artistic career, Miruh Kabashi has accomplished:

In Theater – performed around 100 roles

In Cinema – over 30 characters (more than half in leading roles)

On Television – dozens of programs, concerts, and TV films

Artistically debuted (as a reciter) on hundreds of stages across different countries and cities in Europe, America, and beyond

National Awards: In Theater:

"Second Best Actor" at the National Theater Festival – 1983

"Second Best Actor in Theater" in the Grand National Competition on the 40th Anniversary of the Liberation of the Country – 1984

"Best Actor" at the 9th National Theater Festival – 1989

"Best Actor" at the National Theater Festival – 1990

"Best Actor" at the First Nationwide Acting Festival – 2002

"Best Actor" at the Mediterranean Festival Butrinti 2000 – 2002

“Critics’ Prize” at the Bonn Biennale Festival – 2010

“Career Award” at KokoFest – 2021

In Cinema:

“Gold Medal” for the performance in the film Concert with 36 – 1979

“Gold Medal” for the performance in the film The Carnivals – 1981

“Gold Medal” for the performance in the film The Warm Hand – 1981

“Gold Medal” for the performance in the film The Deputy of Women – 1987

Mirush Kabashi with the performance "The True Apology of Socrates", which is also the first monodrama in the history of the Albanian National Theater, and the most acclaimed in Albanian theater, according to international juries, critics, and mass media.

He has represented the Albanian language and theater in several Grade A International Theater Festivals, on prestigious stages in global art metropolises such as Paris, Vienna, London, Cairo, Toronto, Milton, Kiev, Athens, Belgrade, Geneva (in the UN Plenary Hall, Room XX), Lyon, Plovdiv, etc.

Some of the International Jury Awards: Event Country - Year Recognition International Theater Festival – Cairo ’97 Egypt – 1997 Best Actor of the Festival (Golden Sphinx) International Theater Festival – Cairo ’99 Egypt – 1999 One of the 10 Guests of Honor (From the Theater World), awarded the Career Medal Balkan Monodrama Festival – Bitola North Macedonia – 2003 Nominated European Festival "Slavia" – Belgrade Serbia – 2004 Nominated International Festival “Kiev-Traverny” Ukraine – Kiev – 2005 Most Promising Actor of the Festival, awarded the Golden Disc of the Festival; 30,000 calling cards made in his honor International Festival “Theater at the Crossroads” – Plovdiv Bulgaria – 2007 Festival Cup awarded by the Minister of Culture of Bulgaria International Festival “Teuta” – Kotor Montenegro – 2008 No prize structure International Festival “Neo Cosmos” – Athens Greece – 2009 No prize structure European Festival “European Spring” – Lyon France – 2012 No prize structure

High Honors from the President of the Republic: "MERITED ARTIST" – 1983

"GRAND MASTER OF THE STAGE" – 1998

"HONOR OF THE NATION" – 2014

His passion for acting appeared in childhood. "I remember that even as a child, I really loved not only theater performances but also films. Now, I smile when I think that I watched a movie like Hamlet, for instance, more than 15 times, in all kinds of positions, at summer or winter cinemas. I always had the desire to watch movies, to admire and discuss the participating actors. Then, my approach to acting came as an opportunity," the actor expressed in a media interview.

In December 1946, Kabashi’s uncle, Skënder Çela, along with his friend Mark Toçi, were executed without trial by officers of the Sigurimi. These young men from Durrës had come into conflict with the communist regime's interests.

In 2010, Kabashi and a group led by him began excavations in Qafë-Plloçë, Pogradec, to find the remains of the two young men. After many meetings and research, he obtained data and documents confirming that they were executed by "Sigurimi" officers on the shores of Lake Pogradec, and their bodies were later left in the hills of Qafë-Plloçë. Although the excavations lasted a long time, Kabashi was unable to find his uncle’s remains.

Kabashi died on December 5, 2023, at the age of 75, after battling with cancer for 5 years. He had two children.

== Acting career ==
Mirush Kabashi stood out for the emotional depth and interpretation of his roles. His characters are notable for their originality and elegance, embodying distinctly different personalities selected with wisdom and intuition. He particularly excelled in satirical and comedic roles. He initially gained recognition with the comedic role of Teli in Kartela e verdhë (Yellow Dossier) by Haxhi Rama (1976), where he portrayed an enthusiastic sports fan with expressive detail in both gesture and speech.

This role was followed by other comedic characters, such as Diafoirus in Molière’s I sëmuri imagjinar (The Imaginary Invalid) (1982), where he displayed refined physical elegance and gesture that added grace, charm, and a classicist style to his performance.

"In theatre, I learned what it meant to be an actor. I went through difficulties like everyone else, then I participated in films and plays. One thing I can say with confidence: I have never feared or avoided work under any conditions. When it comes to trying something, to have the opportunity to connect with the audience, I have never refused — on the contrary, I have boldly accepted. One such area is recitation, which I showcased before you today," said Kabashi.

A significant portion of his life was dedicated to theater with his diverse roles, among which the most special remains Socrates in Apologjia e vërtetë e Sokratit (Socrates' True Apology). This role is perhaps his artistic pinnacle, where his interpretative power reached praiseworthy and internationally competitive heights. Kabashi underwent a complete psycho-physical transformation; his physical expression and speech were finely tuned. With his temperament and energy, he channeled a passionate and ironic Socratic monologue, delivering a powerful critique of tyranny, injustice, and corruption through unrelenting sarcasm, giving the entire performance a contemporary dimension.

In cinema, one of his most well-known roles is that of Apostol Sako in the comedy Edhe kështu edhe ashtu (Either Way; 1989).

== Honours ==
Among the most important honours Kabashi received are the titles: "People's Artist", "Merited Artist", "Grand Master of Work", and "Honour of the Nation".

He was awarded the "Merited Artist" title in 1983 for his role in the movie Koncert në vitin 1936 (Concert in the Year 1936; 1978). Enver Hoxha and the Politburo of the Party of Labour of Albania highly valued Kabashi's ability to portray a stammerer, so much so that they awarded him this title despite his family background not being favorable in the eyes of the regime.

He was awarded the "Grand Master of Work" title in 1998 for his portrayal of Socrates in Apologjia e vërtetë e Sokratit, and the "Honor of the Nation" title in 2016.

At the National Festival of Professional Theaters in 1989, he was named “Best Actor” for his role as Sadush Neziri in the comedy Hija e tjetrit (The Other's Shadow) by Ruzhdi Pulaha. He received similar acclaim for the same role at the Balkan Theater Festival in Corinth, Greece. In 2002, he won the “Best Leading Actor” award at the “Apollon 2002” Acting Festival for his role as Noka in Sa mirë bëri që vdiq (It Was Good That He Died) by Ilir Bezhani.

In 1997, at the 9th edition of the Experimental Theater Festival held in Cairo, Egypt, Mirush Kabashi was honoured with the “Golden Sphinx” as the most successful performer among one thousand actors from forty-six countries worldwide, for his role of Socrates in Albanian.

== Filmography ==
Year	Original title	Translated title	Role
1976	Emblema e dikurshme	The Former Emblem	Veniamin Papa
1976	Zani partizani	Zani the Partisan	The partisan, brother of Zani
1978	Koncert në vitin 1936	Concert in the Year 1936	Lieutenant Shazivari
1979	Radiostacioni	The Radio Station	Radio worker
1980	Gëzhoja e vjetër	The Old Cartridge	Bakja
1980	Një ndodhi në port	An event at the Port	Çaloja
1980	Shoqja nga fshati	The Village Girl	Uncle Nasi
1983	Dora e ngrohtë	The Warm Hand	Brahushi
1983	Kohë e largët	A Distant Time	Asketi Lithan
1984	Nxënësit e klasës sime	My Class Students	Nardi the teacher
1987	Zëvendësi i grave	The Women's Deputy	Lisimak Voci
1987	Telefoni i një mëngjesi	A Morning Phone Call	Kujtimi
1987	Binarët	The Rails	Dyrri
1989	Edhe ashtu edhe kështu	Either Way	Apostol Sako
1998	Nata	The Night	
2008	Ne dhe Lenini	Us and Lenin	
2009	Lutjet e dashurisë or Kronikë provinciale	Love Prayers or Provincial Chronicle	

== See also ==
- List of Albanian actors
- List of people from Shkodër
