= Guillermo Padula =

Uruguayan footballer (born 1997)

Personal information
- Full name: Guillermo Padula Lenna
- Date of birth: 16 September 1997 (age 29)
- Place of birth: Colonia del Sacramento, Uruguay
- Height: 1.81 m (5 ft 11 in)
- Position: Centre back

Team information
- Current team: Rapperswil-Jona
- Number: 13

Youth career
- Plaza Colonia

Senior career*
Years	Team	Apps	(Gls)
2014–2018	Plaza Colonia	71	(2)
2019	Mendrisio	12	(0)
2019–2020	Bellinzona	7	(0)
2020	Paradiso	0	(0)
2020–2022	Schaffhausen	54	(3)
2022–2023	Bellinzona	17	(1)
2023	→ Schaffhausen (loan)	12	(1)
2023–2024	La Luz	6	(1)
2024–	Rapperswil-Jona	46	(1)

International career
2015	Uruguay U-18	1	(0)
2016	Uruguay U-20	3	(0)
- * Club domestic league appearances and goals as of 30 September 2026

Guillermo Padula Lenna (born 16 September 1997) is a Uruguayan footballer who plays as a centre back for Swiss club Rapperswil-Jona.

== Career ==
Padula started his career with Uruguayan second division side Plaza Colonia, helping them earn promotion and win the 2015–16 Uruguayan Primera División. On 5 April 2014, Padula made his league debut for Plaza Colonia during a 1-0 win over Rampla Juniors. On 27 September 2015, Padula scored his first goal for Plaza Colonia during a 1-1 draw with Juventud (Las Piedras). After that, he signed for FC Mendrisio in the Swiss fourth division.

In 2019, Padula signed for Swiss third division club Bellinzona.

Before the second half of 2019–20, he signed for FC Paradiso in the Swiss fourth division.

In 2020, he signed for Swiss second division team FCS.
