= Kevin Martin (footballer) =

Swiss footballer (born 1995)

Personal information
- Date of birth: 13 June 1995 (age 31)
- Place of birth: Lausanne, Switzerland
- Height: 1.80 m (5 ft 11 in)
- Position: Goalkeeper

Team information
- Current team: Lausanne Ouchy
- Number: 21

Youth career
- FC Cossonay
- Foot Région Morges
- –2009: Yverdon-Sport
- 2009–2013: Lausanne-Sport

Senior career*
Years	Team	Apps	(Gls)
2013–2018	Team Vaud U21	55	(0)
2013–2018	Lausanne-Sport	13	(0)
2018–2026	Yverdon-Sport	144	(0)
2026–	Lausanne Ouchy	1	(0)

International career
2014	Switzerland U19	3	(0)
- * Club domestic league appearances and goals as of 20 September 2026

Kevin Martin (born 13 June 1995) is a Swiss professional footballer who plays as a goalkeeper for Swiss Challenge League club Lausanne Ouchy.

== Club career ==
Martin made his first steps in professional football with Lausanne-Sport, making nine appearances in the Swiss Super League during the 2016–17 season. In 2018, he signed for Yverdon-Sport.

== International career ==
Martin made three appearances for the Switzerland U19 team in 2014. He was also called up with the Switzerland U20 team later on, but did not make any appearances.

== Career statistics ==
As of match played 10 October 2020

Appearances and goals by club, season and competition
Club	Season	League			Cup		Other		Total	
Club	Season	Division	Apps	Goals	Apps	Goals	Apps	Goals	Apps	Goals
Team Vaud U21	2013–14	2. Liga Interregional	17	0	—		—		17	0
Team Vaud U21	2014–15	1. Liga Classic	15	0	—		—		15	0
Team Vaud U21	2015–16	1. Liga Classic	12	0	—		—		12	0
Team Vaud U21	2016–17	1. Liga Classic	6	0	—		—		6	0
Team Vaud U21	2017–18	1. Liga Classic	5	0	—		—		5	0
Team Vaud U21	Total		55	0	0	0	0	0	55	0
Lausanne-Sport	2015–16	Challenge League	4	0	1	0	—		5	0
Lausanne-Sport	2016–17	Super League	9	0	0	0	—		9	0
Lausanne-Sport	2017–18	Super League	0	0	0	0	—		0	0
Lausanne-Sport	Total		13	0	1	0	0	0	14	0
Yverdon-Sport	2018–19	Promotion League	20	0	1	0	—		21	0
Yverdon-Sport	2019–20	Promotion League	17	0	0	0	—		17	0
Yverdon-Sport	2020–21	Promotion League	10	0	0	0	—		10	0
Yverdon-Sport	Total		47	0	1	0	0	0	48	0
Career total			115	0	2	0	0	0	117	0

== Honours ==
Team Vaud U21

- 2. Liga Interregional Group 2: 2013–14

Lausanne-Sport

- Swiss Challenge League: 2015–16
