= Elvis Kabashi =

Albanian footballer (born 1994)

Personal information
- Date of birth: 20 February 1994 (age 32)
- Place of birth: Massa, Italy
- Height: 1.84 m (6 ft 1/2 in)
- Position: Left midfielder

Team information
- Current team: Perugia
- Number: 77

Youth career
- 2010–2013: Empoli
- 2012–2013: → Juventus (loan)

Senior career*
Years	Team	Apps	(Gls)
2012–2017	Juventus	0	(0)
2013–2014	→ Pescara (loan)	1	(0)
2014–2015	→ Den Bosch (loan)	20	(2)
2015–2017	→ Pontedera (loan)	55	(10)
2017	Viterbese	9	(0)
2018	Livorno	12	(0)
2019	Dinamo București	3	(0)
2019–2021	Renate	43	(7)
2021–2022	Como	21	(0)
2022–2025	Reggiana	72	(6)
2026	Pontedera	10	(1)
2026–	Perugia	2	(0)

International career
2012–2013	Albania U19	2	(1)
- * Club domestic league appearances and goals as of 30 August 2026

Elvis Kabashi (born 20 February 1994) is a professional footballer who plays as a left midfielder for Serie C Group B club Perugia. Born in Italy, he represents Albania internationally.

== Early life ==
Kabashi was born in Massa, Italy to an Albanian family. His family are a part of the Kabashi tribe.

== Career ==
=== Juventus ===
Following a successful loan spell playing with the Juventus youth team, for a loan fee of €150,000, Kabashi was signed outright from Empoli for a fee of €700,000 in a 4-year contract. He signed for Juventus alongside fellow Empoli youth player Daniele Rugani.

In summer 2014, he was loaned to Eerste Divisie side Den Bosch and in 2015, he was signed by Pontedera. On 31 August 2016 the loan was renewed.

=== Renate ===
On 23 July 2019, he signed with Serie C club Renate.

=== Reggiana ===
On 29 August 2022, Kabashi signed a one-season contract with Reggiana.

On 6 July 2023, he extended his contract for the club until 2025.
