= 2017–18 Promotion League =

Swiss Promotion League
- Season: 2017–2018
- Champions: SC Kriens
- Promoted: SC Kriens
- Relegated: FC United Zurich; FC La Chaux-de-Fonds
- Matches played: 240
- All statistics correct as of May 25, 2018.

The 2017–18 Promotion League season is the 6th edition (the 4th since its name change) of the 3rd division of Swiss Football and is the third level of the football hierarchy in Switzerland, behind the Super League and the Challenge League. The Championship has 16 teams and each team plays 30 games.

FC Le Mont LS, which he had not received the license III in the 1st instance, has decided not to appeal. The club also decides that the team will also not play in Promotion League. FC United Zurich, 15th in the 2016-2017 season, is maintained in Promotion League. The 2017-2018 season started on 2 August 2017 and will finish on 26 May 2018.

== Teams ==
The 2017–18 season saw two new clubs in the league, Yverdon Sport FC and FC Stade Lausanne-Ouchy which were all promoted from the 1. Liga Classic. No club was relegated from the Challenge League as FC Le Mont didn't get their league licence by the Swiss Football Association and subsequently relegated.

Club	Canton	Stadium	Capacity	2016-2017 season results
SC Kriens	Lucerne	Stadion Kleinfeld	5,100	2nd
FC Basel U-21	Basel-City	Stadion Rankhof	7,000	3rd
FC Stade Nyonnais	Vaud	Stade de Colovray	7,200	4th
FC Zürich U-21	Zürich	Sportplatz Heerenschürli	1,120	5th
FC Breitenrain Bern	Bern	Spitalacker	1,450	6th
SC Brühl	St. Gallen	Paul-Grüninger-Stadion	4,200	7th
FC Köniz	Bern	Liebefeld	1,000	8th
FC La Chaux-de-Fonds	Neuchâtel	Stade de la Charrière	12,700	9th
FC Sion U-21	Valais	Stade de Tourbillon	20,200	10th
SC Cham	Zug	Stadion Eizmoos	1,800	11th
BSC Old Boys	Basel-City	Stadion Schützenmatte	8,000	12th
SC YF Juventus	Zürich	Utogrund	2,850	13th
FC Bavois	Vaud	Terrain des Peupliers	659	14th
FC United Zürich	Zürich	Sportanlage Buchlern	1,150	15th
Yverdon-Sport	Vaud	Stade Municipal	8,200	winner of group 1 of 1. Liga Classic
Lausanne-Ouchy	Vaud	Centre sportif de Vidy	2,000	runner up of group 1 of 1. Liga Classic

== Table ==
Pos	Team	Pld	W	D	L	GF	GA	GD	Pts	Promotion, qualification or relegation
1	SC Kriens (C, P)	30	22	3	5	76	31	+45	69	2017/2018 Promotion League Champion
2	FC Stade Nyonnais	30	20	4	6	64	33	+31	64	directly qualified for 2018/2019 Swiss Cup
3	Yverdon-Sport	30	18	2	10	64	48	+16	56	directly qualified for 2018/2019 Swiss Cup
4	FC Basel U-21	30	12	9	9	53	44	+9	45	
5	FC Stade Lausanne-Ouchy	30	12	7	11	56	57	−1	43	
6	FC Zürich U-21	30	11	10	9	60	50	+10	43	
7	FC Köniz	30	12	6	12	56	53	+3	42	
8	SC Brühl	30	10	10	10	51	45	+6	40	
9	FC Breitenrain	30	11	6	13	56	61	−5	39	
10	FC Sion U-21	30	9	11	10	47	46	+1	38	
11	SC Cham	30	9	11	10	50	58	−8	38	
12	SC YF Juventus	30	10	6	14	48	56	−8	36	
13	FC Bavois	29	9	7	13	38	51	−13	34	
14	BSC Old Boys (Note: BSC Old Boys Basel voluntarily relegated at the end of the season.) (R)	30	8	7	15	48	61	−13	31	Relegation to 2018–19 1. Liga Classic
15	FC La Chaux-de-Fonds	31	8	6	17	37	55	−18	30	
16	FC United Zürich (R)	30	5	3	22	35	89	−54	18	Relegation to 2018–19 1. Liga Classic

Rules for classification: 1) Points;
(C) Champions; (P) Promoted; (R) Relegated

== Topscorer ==
Top Scorer
