= Valon Hamdiu =

Kosovan-Swiss footballer (born 1998)

Personal information
- Date of birth: 10 June 1998 (age 28)
- Place of birth: Wattwil, Switzerland
- Height: 1.87 m (6 ft 2 in)
- Positions: Defensive midfielder; centre-back

Team information
- Current team: Rapperswil-Jona
- Number: 8

Youth career
- 2009–2011: Zürich
- 2011: Wattwil-Bunt
- 2012–2013: Wil
- 2013–2017: St. Gallen

Senior career*
Years	Team	Apps	(Gls)
2016–2017	St. Gallen U21	12	(0)
2017–2018	Wil	0	(0)
2018	→ St. Gallen U21 (loan)	10	(1)
2018–2019	Winterthur U21	21	(2)
2019–2020	Winterthur	22	(1)
2020–2023	Schaffhausen	88	(2)
2023–2024	Stade Lausanne Ouchy	18	(0)
2024–2025	Bellinzona	11	(0)
2025	→ Schaffhausen (loan)	12	(0)
2025–2026	Unirea Slobozia	20	(0)
2026	Septemvri Sofia	7	(0)
2026–	Rapperswil-Jona	6	(0)

International career
2019–2020	Kosovo U21	3	(0)
- * Club domestic league appearances and goals as of 18 September 2026

Valon Hamdiu (born 10 June 1998) is a professional footballer who plays as a defensive midfielder or a centre-back for Swiss Challenge League club Rapperswil-Jona. Born in Switzerland, he represents Kosovo internationally.
