= Allan Eleouet =

Swiss footballer (born 1994)

Personal information
- Date of birth: 29 July 1994 (age 32)
- Place of birth: France
- Positions: Winger; forward

Team information
- Current team: Bavois
- Number: 9

Senior career*
Years	Team	Apps	(Gls)
–2013	Baulmes	12	(1)
2013–2015	Bavois	43	(3)
2015–2019	Yverdon	87	(19)
2019–2020	Stade Lausanne	15	(0)
2020–2022	Yverdon	47	(8)
2022–2023	Tuzla City	15	(0)
2023–2025	Étoile Carouge	30	(4)
2024–2025	→ Vevey-Sports (loan)	27	(1)
2025	Vevey-Sports	4	(1)
2025–	Bavois	24	(10)
- * Club domestic league appearances and goals as of 1 October 2026

Allan Eleouet (born 29 July 1994) is a Swiss footballer who plays as a winger and forward for Bavois.

== Career ==
Eleouet started his career with Swiss fifth tier side Baulmes. In 2015, he signed for Yverdon in the Swiss fourth tier, helping them achieve promotion to the Swiss second tier within 6 seasons.

In 2022, Eleouet signed for Bosnia and Herzegovina club Tuzla City. On 7 August 2022, he debuted for Tuzla City during a 0–0 draw with Sloboda (Tuzla).
