= Bruno Morgado =

Swiss footballer (born 1997)

Personal information
- Full name: Bruno Ferreira Morgado
- Date of birth: 16 December 1997 (age 28)
- Place of birth: Monthey, Switzerland
- Height: 1.76 m (5 ft 9 in)
- Position: Left-back

Team information
- Current team: Rapperswil-Jona
- Number: 3

Youth career
- 2005–2010: FC Saint-Maurice
- 2010–2011: FC Saxon Sports
- 2011: FC Saint-Maurice
- 2011–2012: FC Saxon Sports
- 2012–2016: Sion

Senior career*
Years	Team	Apps	(Gls)
2016–2020	Sion	27	(1)
2020	Rapperswil-Jona	0	(0)
2020–2021	Neuchâtel Xamax	32	(0)
2022–2023	Bellinzona	20	(0)
2023–	Rapperswil-Jona	101	(2)

International career^{‡}
2014–2015	Switzerland U18	6	(0)
2015–2016	Switzerland U19	3	(0)
2016	Switzerland U20	2	(0)
- * Club domestic league appearances and goals as of 30 September 2026 ‡ National team caps and goals as of 1 June 2021

Bruno Ferreira Morgado (born 16 December 1997) is a Swiss professional footballer who plays as a left-back for Rapperswil-Jona.

== Club career ==
On 11 September 2016, Morgado made his professional debut with FC Sion in a 2016–17 Swiss Super League match against FC Thun.

== International career ==
Morgado was born in Switzerland and is of Portuguese descent. He is a former youth international for Switzerland.
