= Arian Kabashi (footballer, born 1997) =

Swedish footballer (born 1997)

Personal information
- Date of birth: 14 March 1997 (age 29)
- Place of birth: Sweden
- Height: 1.80 m (5 ft 11 in)
- Position: Forward

Team information
- Current team: Utsiktens BK
- Number: 10

Youth career
- –2010: Hestrafors IF
- 2011–2017: IF Elfsborg

Senior career*
Years	Team	Apps	(Gls)
2018–2020	IF Elfsborg	5	(0)
2019	→ GAIS (loan)	12	(1)
2020	→ Dalkurd FF (loan)	24	(3)
2021–2022	Dalkurd FF	40	(11)
2022–2025	Helsingborgs IF	31	(1)
2025–	Utsiktens BK	23	(3)
- * Club domestic league appearances and goals as of 16 November 2025

Arian Kabashi (born 14 March 1997) is an Albanian professional footballer who plays as a forward for Utsiktens BK.

== Club career ==
=== IF Elfsborg ===
==== 2017 season ====
On 26 February 2017, Kabashi made his debut with IF Elfsborg in the 2016–17 Svenska Cupen group stage against Ytterhogdals IK after coming on as a substitute in the 65th minute in place of Jesper Karlsson. Seven days later, he scored his first goal for IF Elfsborg in his second appearance for the club in a 6–1 home win over Falkenbergs FF in Svenska Cupen.

==== 2018 season ====
On 3 January 2018, Kabashi signed his first professional contract with Allsvenskan side IF Elfsborg after agreeing to a two-year deal. On 8 April 2018, he played the first match as professional player in a 1–0 home defeat against Kalmar FF after coming on as a substitute in the 62nd minute in place of Simon Olsson.

==== 2019 season as loan at GAIS ====
On 14 January 2019, Kabashi joined Superettan side GAIS, on a season-long loan. His debut with GAIS came on 14 February in the 2018–19 Svenska Cupen group stage against Örebro SK after coming on as a substitute in the 78th minute in place of Edin Hamidović.

=== Dalkurd FF ===
==== 2020 season as loan ====
On 14 December 2019, Kabashi joined Superettan side Dalkurd FF, on a season-long loan and this loan would become legally effective in January 2020. His debut with Dalkurd FF came on 22 February 2020 in the 2019–20 Svenska Cupen group stage against Djurgårdens IF after being named in the starting line-up.

==== 2021 season as a permanent player ====
On 20 January 2021, Kabashi signed a two-year contract with Ettan Norra club Dalkurd FF. His debut with Dalkurd FF came a day later in the 2020–21 Svenska Cupen group stage against BK Häcken after being named in the starting line-up.

=== Helsingborgs IF ===
On 6 August 2022, Kabashi signed a three-and-a-half-year contract with Allsvenskan club Helsingborgs IF. His debut with Helsingborgs IF came two days later in a 5–0 away defeat against BK Häcken after coming on as a substitute in the 38th minute in place of Alexander Faltsetas. Thirteen days after debut, Kabashi scored his first goal for Helsingborgs IF in his third appearance for the club in a 1–2 away win over GIF Sundsvall in Allsvenskan.

On January 15, 2025, Kabashi terminated his contract with Helsingborgs.

== International career ==
Born and raised in Sweden, Kabashi is of Kosovo Albanian origin from Istog. His family are from the Kabashi tribe. In September 2016, Kabashi declared that he was interested in representing Kosovo. On 17 January 2017, Kabashi received a call-up from Albania U21 for a seven-day training camp in Durrës.
