= Miguel Rodrigues (footballer, born 1996) =

Swiss footballer

Personal information
- Date of birth: 7 December 1996 (age 29)
- Place of birth: Geneva, Switzerland
- Height: 1.84 m (6 ft 0 in)
- Positions: Centre back; right back

Team information
- Current team: Bavois
- Number: 22

Senior career*
Years	Team	Apps	(Gls)
2013–2017	Servette	20	(0)
2017–2021	Thun	44	(1)
2021–2024	Yverdon	24	(0)
2023–2024	→ Bellinzona (loan)	32	(1)
2024	Vevey-Sports	13	(0)
2025–	Bavois	51	(1)
- * Club domestic league appearances and goals as of 1 October 2026

Miguel Rodrigues (born 7 December 1996) is a Swiss footballer who plays as a defender for Swiss Promotion League club Bavois.

== Career ==
On 31 March 2018, Rodrigues made his professional debut with FC Thun in a 2017–18 Swiss Super League match against Grasshopper.

On 23 June 2021, he signed with Yverdon.

== Personal life ==
Rodrigues was born in Switzerland and is of Portuguese descent.
