= Kabash =

Kabash: Kabash (Albanian)
- Village
- Interactive map of Kabash
- Location within Kosovo
- Coordinates: 42.302977°N 21.353306°E
- Country: Kosovo
- District: Gjilan
- Municipality: Viti

Population (2024)
  - Total: 1,783
- Time zone: UTC+1 (CET)
  - Summer (DST): UTC+2 (CEST)

Kabash is a village in the Viti Municipality of southeast Kosovo.

== History ==
The ancestors of the inhabitants of the village belong to the Kabashi tribe.

The Austro-Hungarian consulate in Belgrade reported that during February 1913, Serbian military forces executed all Albanian inhabitants of the villages of Kabash, Tërpezë, Lubisht and Gjylekar.

== Geography ==
The village is located in the Anamorava valley and is situated on the foot of the Karadak mountains.
