= Kabash Mountain =

Mountain in Kosovo

Coordinates: 42.25°N 20.833333°E

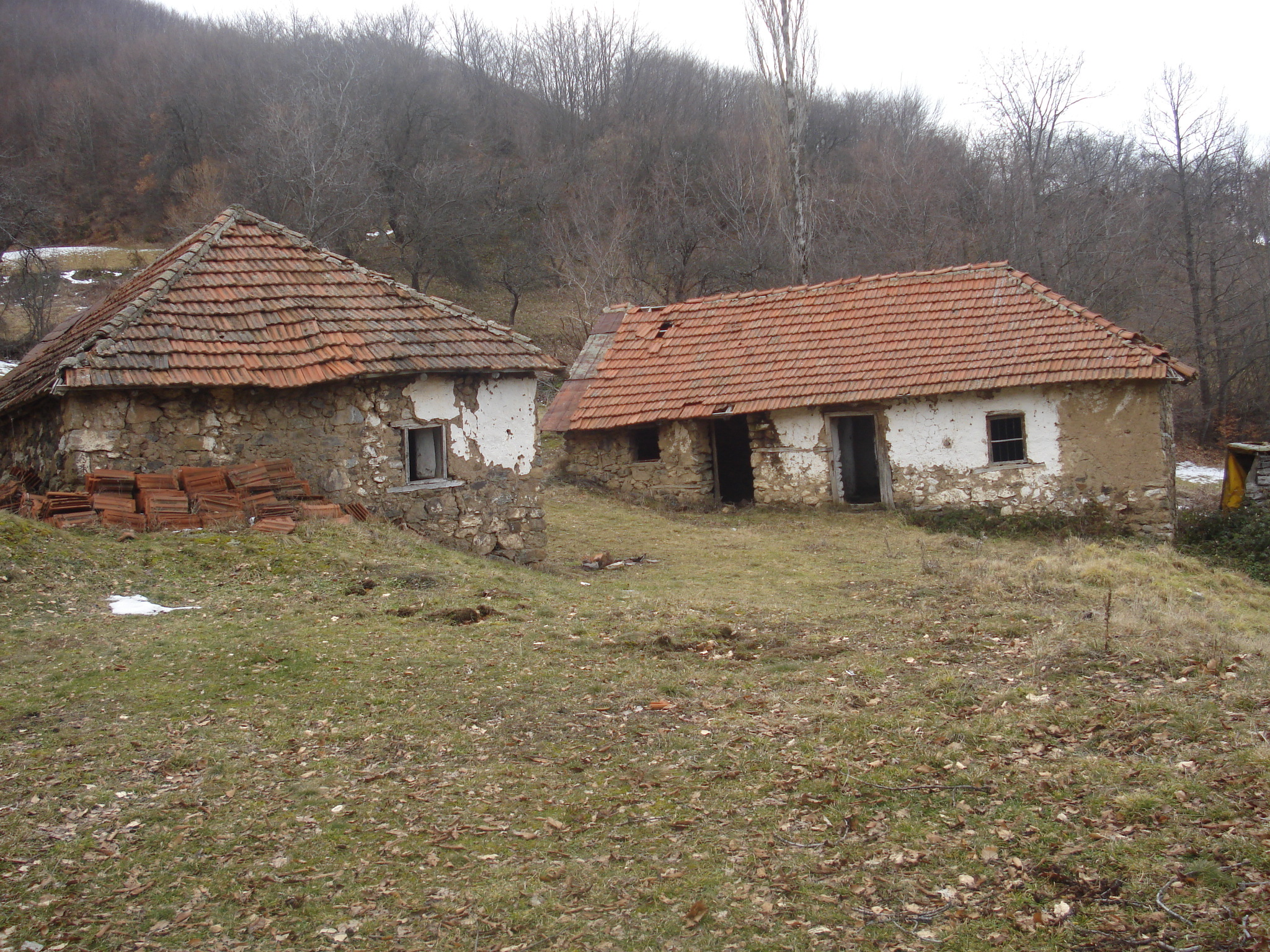
Huts in the Kabashi Mountains

Kabash is a mountain near Korisha in the Prizren Municipality of Kosovo. It is named after the Albanian Kabashi tribe, and is part of the wider Kabash Mountains chain (Bjeshkët e Kabashit) that belongs to the Sharr Mountains. It also holds the remains of the Saint Mark Koriški Monastery.

== Conservation ==
Kabash Mountain is one of the protected areas of the Sharr Mountains designated as lands reserved for touristic development and sports/recreational activities, as well as grazing pastures and private properties for the local community that is located near the villages that border the National Park.

== Fauna ==
Kabash Mountain is home to several different species of fauna, notably the European badger.
