= Pedro Pacheco (engineer) =

Portuguese civil engineer and professor of bridges

- Born: 7 December 1967 (age 58); Porto, Portugal
- Education: FEUP
- Occupations: Chairman of BERD (executive); Professor of Bridges at FEUP
- Known for: Founder of BERD, SA
- Website: BERD

Pedro Álvares Ribeiro do Carmo Pacheco (born 7 December 1967) is a Portuguese civil engineer and professor of bridges at the Engineering Faculty of Porto University. He also co-founded BERD, a bridge engineering company. Pacheco is the mentor of the organic prestressing system concept (OPS concept), based on the human muscle, used in bridge engineering worldwide.

He is responsible for the project of more than 500,000 m^{2} of bridge and building structures, project revision of several buildings of relevant importance. He was involved as Project Manager/Consultant or Project Reviewer in Major Projects as Braga Municipal Stadium, Ponte Infante D. Henrique (Bridge with 280m span), and Casa da Música, before 2004. After 2004 involved in several Bridges Projects, Worwilde.

Also, he is a member of GPBE (Portuguese Group of Structural Concrete), (Internacional Association for Shell and Spatial Structures) and IABSE (International Association of Bridges and Structural Engineering).

== Early life ==
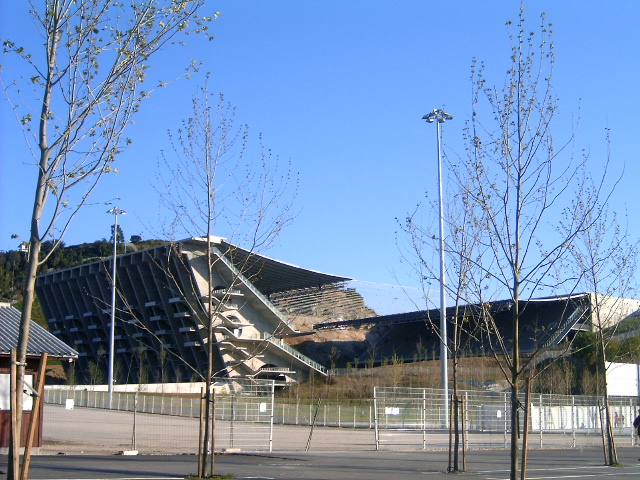
Braga Municipal Stadium, Braga

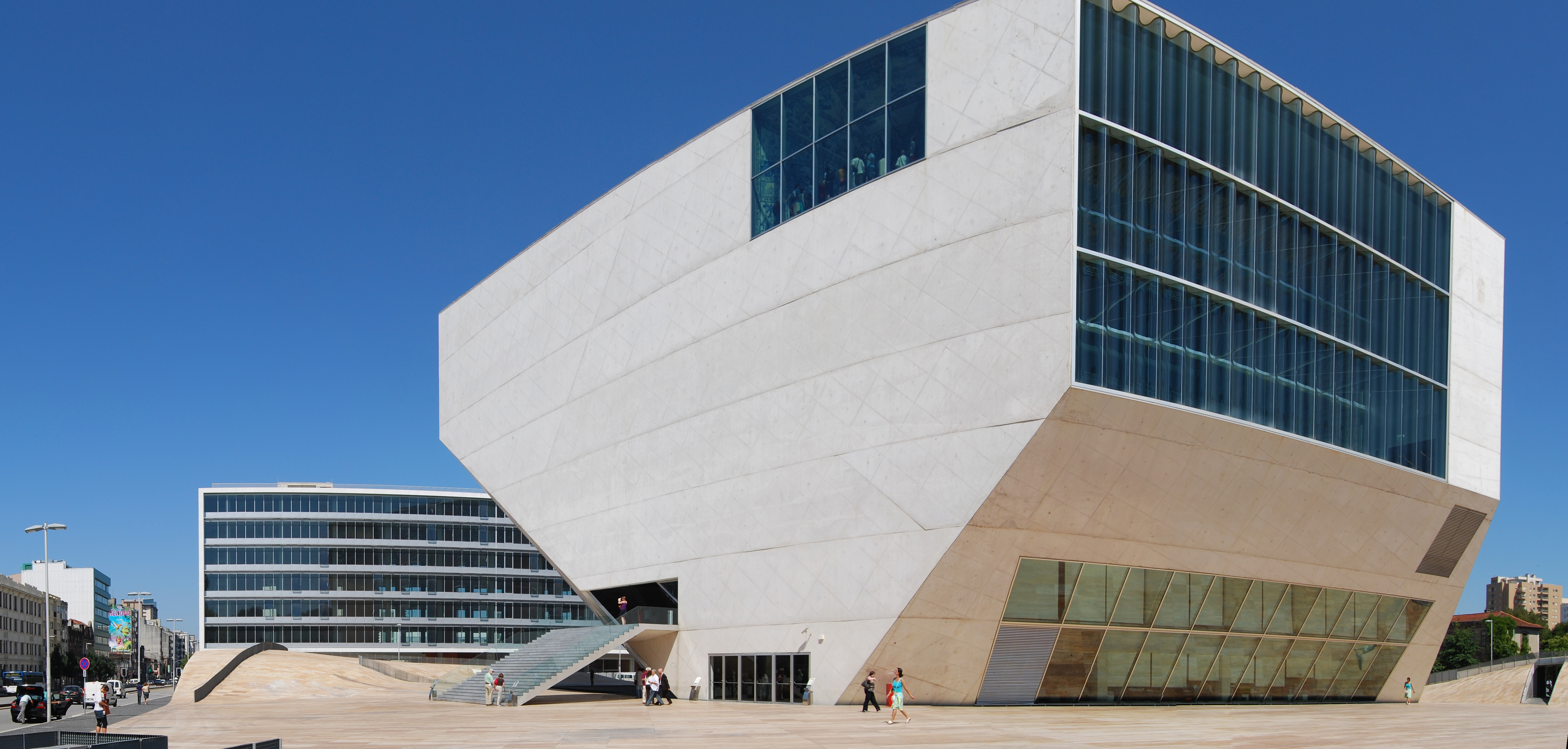
Casa da Música, Porto

Pacheco was born in Porto, a city known for its wine, its architecture and Eiffel Bridge, the last one inspired him to pursue his formation. He started his education in Garcia da Horta High School, and he later studied Civil Engineering at FEUP (Engineering Faculty of Porto University) where, after he graduated in 1991, he achieved the Msc Degree in 1994 and the PhD Degree in 1999, all of them with distinction.

After his graduation, in 1991, he became a Partner of AFAssociados. In that project, Pacheco was involved in several structures projects, which included buildings, bridges and viaducts. He was the main responsible for more than 500.000 m2 of projects of different types.

He was responsible for preliminary design study of Braga Municipal Stadium and was involved in the constructive methods studies of Ponte Infante D. Henrique. He was a design checker of Porto's Casa da Música in Porto and project manager of several structures such as Vodafone Headquarters in Lisbon.

In 2000, Pacheco was invited to be Professor of Bridges in FEUP (Engineering Faculty of Porto University) and after that, Member of the Construction Studies Center, in 2001.

Finally, in 2003 (Portugal) he completed the concept that he had been developing in his research, the OPS Concept, and in 2004 (other 68 countries) he registered the latest discovery, now known as OPS (Organic Prestressing System). In 2006, Pacheco co-founded BERD.

== BERD ==
Pacheco was co-founder of BERD (Bridge, Engineering, Research & Design), where he is, nowadays, President & CEO. This organization researches, develops and applies bridge construction methods.
Founded in 2006, BERD explores the potential of OPS (Organic Prestressing System) and has a professional multi-disciplinary research and development team.

The company is involved in several projects in Brazil, United States of America, Canada, Colombia, México, Mozambique, Turquia, India and South Korea in the construction of several bridges in Spain, Belgium, Czech Republic, Slovakia, Portugal and Brazil.

BERD is one of the world top five companies in bridge engineering and construction methods.

"Their innovative machines and their technology combining active control on launching gantries have pushed the limits of the industrialized bridge construction to values unimaginable until very recent years ago." Javier Manterola

=== Selection of projects ===
Bridge engineering and construction methods solutions

- Bridge over Sousa River, Portugal (2004/ 2005)
- Bridge over Cabriel River, Valencia, Spain (2008/ 2009)
- Sokolov-Tisova Viaduct, Czech Republic (2010)
- Viaduct over Hostovsky Creek Valley, Slovakia (2010/ 2011)
- Opatovice Canal, Czech Republic (2011)
- Viaduct over Corgo River Valley, Portugal (2011/ 2012)
- Rodoanel Leste Viaducts, São Paulo, Brazil (2013/ 2014)
- Laguna Bridge, Laguna, Santa Catarina, Brazil (2013/2014)

== Publications ==
- 1993 - "Solutions of Nature for Structural Problems" (in Portuguese), MSC Thesis, FEUP (Engineering Faculty of Porto University)
- 1999 - "Organic Prestressing – An Example of an Effector System", (in Portuguese), PhD Thesis, FEUP (Engineering Faculty of Porto University)
- 2002 - Pacheco, P.; Adão da Fonseca A. - "Organic Prestressing", in "Journal of Structural Engineering", American Society of Civil Engineers, pp 400–405, March 2002
- 2002 - Pacheco, P.; Adão da Fonseca A., "Organic Prestressing - An Example of an Effector System", in "Structural Concrete", FIB Journal, Vol. 3, Number 2, pp 107, June 2002.
- 2004 - "Auto-adjustable Prestressing", Patent PCT, pct/pt2004/000011, WO2004/109018 (published in more than 30 countries)
- 2006 - A. André, P. Pacheco, A. Adão da Fonseca – "Experimental study of a launching gantry reduced scale model strengthened with organic prestressing", Structural Engineering International (IABSE), Volume 16, pp 49–52
- 2007 - P. Pacheco, A. Guerra, P. Borges, H. Coelho, "A scaffolding system strengthened with organic prestressing – the first of a new generation of structures", Structural Engineering International (IABSE), Vol.17, nr.4, pg. 314-321
- 2007 - P. Pacheco, A. Guerra, P. Borges, H. Coelho, "OPS – a new technology in Bridge Engineering – Overview (in Polish), "Inżynieria i Budownictwo", Nr. 10/2007, pp. 520-524.
- 2009 – P. Pacheco, A. Adão da Fonseca, A. Resende, R. Campos, "Sustainability in bridge construction processes"; Clean Technologies and Environmental Policy, Springer, Volume 12, Issue 1, Page 75-82.
- 2010 – P. Pacheco, A. André, P. Borges, T. Oliveira, "Automation robustness of scaffolding systems strengthened with organic prestressing", Automation in Construction, Elsevier, Vol. 19, No. 1. pp. 1–10.
- 2011 – P. Pacheco, H. Coelho, P. Borges, A. Guerra, "Technical Challenges of Large Movable Scaffolding Systems", Structural Engineering International (IABSE), Vol. 21, Number.4 . pp. 450–455.

== Professional Associations & Teaching ==
=== Teaching ===
- 1998: Structures for Architects, University of Minho
- 1999 – 2012: Structures, FEUP (Engineering Faculty of Porto University)
- 2000 – Bridges, McS in Structures, University of Minho
- Since 2012 Professor of Bridges, FEUP (Engineering Faculty of Porto University)
