= FC United Zürich =

Association football club in Switzerland

United Zürich
- Full name: Fussballclub United Zürich
- Founded: 1985; 40 years ago, as FC Fenerbahce Zürich. 2010; 15 years ago, as FC United Zürich.
- Ground: Sportzentrum Buchlern
- Capacity: 1,150
- President: Ali Gibreil Musa
- Manager: Kustrim Dzaferi
- League: 2. Liga
Home colours	Away colours

FC United Zürich is a Swiss Association football club based in Zürich, Switzerland, that competes in the 3. Liga, the seventh tier of Swiss football. Founded in 1985, the club has never played higher than the Third tier.

== History ==
On 1 July 1985, the club was founded by members of the Turkish community in Zürich as FC Fenerbahce Zürich, named after Fenerbahce SK.

In 2008, while in a relegation battle in the eighth division, the club was brought by Orhan Yilmaz and Bernhard Fanger with the aim of rebuilding the club. And making it more multi-national. On 18 March 2010, as part of the rebranding, the club's name was changed from FC Fenerbahce Zürich to FC United Zürich. Domestically, the club's form improved with consecutive 1st place promotions taking them to the sixth tier. The club very nearly achieved triple promotion, finishing 2nd in their first season.

In 2012 the club achieved promotion to the fifth tier. The club started the 2015–16 season with a strong squad, including former professionals like Savvas Exouzidis and Thomas Weller at the end of the season the club was third and qualified for the promotion playoffs. They defeated FC Stade Lausanne Ouchy to reach the finals but lost 1–3 to FC La Chaux-de-Fonds. However, La Chaux went bankrupt and were unable to move up the division, so a single play-off match between Zürich and the other losing finalist, FC Baden, was announced. Zürich won 2–0 and so were promoted to the third tier, having risen 6 divisions in 7 years. In the resulting mania, the club was linked with signing Ronaldo and Rivaldo. Neither of which materialized.

In December 2016, shortly after promotion, Piero Bauert became the club's president. And made major changes to the team, replacing the coach and much of the squad, The team finished in the relegation zone for in their first season and were only saved by the withdrawal of FC Le Mont from the 4th division, removing the second demotion spot. Following this, Bauert resigned and players union SAFP took over. It was a disaster, with double relegations seeing the club down to the 5th tier. In 2019, another change of ownership saw Ali Gibreil Musa become the new owner, promising re-establishment. When the 2019–20 season was halted due to COVID, the club was sitting bottom of the 2. Liga Interregional but were saved from relegation by the abandonment of the season.

== Honours ==
- 4. Liga

Winners: 2008–09

- 3. Liga

Winners: 2009–10

- 2. Liga

Winners: 2011–12

- 2. Liga Interregional

Winners: 2014–15

== Season to season ==
Season	Tier	Division	Place
2007–08	8	4. Liga	9th
2008–09	8	4. Liga	1st
2009–10	7	3. Liga	1st
2010–11	6	2. Liga	2nd
2011–12	6	2. Liga	1st
2012–13	5	2. Liga Interregional	5th
2013–14	5	2. Liga Interregional	6th
2014–15	5	2. Liga Interregional	1st
2015–16	4	1. Liga	3rd
2016–17	3	Promotion League	15th
2017–18	3	Promotion League	16th
2018–19	4	1. Liga	14th
2019–20	5	2. Liga Interregional	14th
2020–21	5	2. Liga Interregional	13th
2021–22	6	2. Liga	13th
2022–23	7	3. Liga	10th
2023–24	7	3. Liga	
