= Shkumbim Sulejmani =

Macedonian-Albanian footballer

Personal information
- Full name: Shkumbim Sulejmani
- Date of birth: 2 August 1986 (age 40)
- Place of birth: Kumanovo, SR Macedonia, Yugoslavia
- Height: 1.82 m (6 ft 0 in)
- Position: Striker

Senior career*
Years	Team	Apps	(Gls)
2005–2006	Zug 94	26	(20)
2006–2007	FC Luzern	2	(0)
2007	→ FC Locarno (loan)	8	(0)
2008–2010	FC Tuggen	38	(27)
2010–2016	Zug 94	117	(74)
2016–2019	SC Kriens	63	(31)
Total		254	(152)

Managerial career
- 2021–2023: Goldau
- * Club domestic league appearances and goals as of 6 May 2019

Shkumbim Sulejmani (Macedonian: Скумбим Сулејмани) (born 2 August 1986) is a Macedonian-Albanian retired football player who holds a Swiss passport as well.

== Club career ==
Born in Kumanovo, modern day North Macedonia, Sulejmani grew up in Switzerland and played for the FC Luzern youth team among others. In May 2016, he joined SC Kriens after six years with Zug 94.

== Managerial career ==
In 2021, Sulejmani was named as the manager of SC Goldau.
