= Qerreti (tribe) =

Region in Albania; historic Albanian tribe

Qerreti is an Albanian tribe or fis from the Pukë region. It is considered part of the "seven tribes of Puka" (Albanian: shtatë bajrakët e Pukës), that inhabit the region. Durham said of them: "Puka group ... sometimes reckoned a large tribe of seven bairaks. Sometimes as a group of tribes". Historically, their heartland was the village of Qerret in Pukë, but place names linked to them can be found in regions as far as Qerret, Kavajë or Qerreti in Velipojë.
