= Samel Šabanović =

Montenegrin footballer

Personal information
- Date of birth: 23 December 1983 (age 42)
- Place of birth: Bijelo Polje, Yugoslavia
- Height: 1.78 m (5 ft 10 in)
- Position: Forward

Team information
- Current team: Eschen-Mauren
- Number: 17

Youth career
- Jedinstvo Bijelo Polje

Senior career*
Years	Team	Apps	(Gls)
2001–2003	Kickers Offenbach	7	(0)
2004–2005	Kreuzlingen	24	(11)
2006–2008	Wil	78	(39)
2008–2011	Grasshopper	14	(0)
2009	→ Esbjerg fB (loan)	14	(4)
2010–2011	→ FC Aarau (loan)	27	(5)
2011–2013	Brühl	36	(19)
2013–2015	Köniz	33	(7)
2014–2015	→ Brühl (loan)	20	(6)
2015–2019	Brühl	119	(50)
2019–2020	Young Fellows Juventus	10	(2)
2020-	Eschen-Mauren	3	(0)
- * Club domestic league appearances and goals as of 10 October 2020

Samel Šabanović (born 23 December 1983) is a Montenegrin footballer who plays for Liechtenstein club Eschen-Mauren in the Swiss 1. Liga.

== Career ==
Šabanović has played for several clubs in Germany and Switzerland as well as on loan for Esbjerg fB in Denmark. He was signed for FC Wil from FC Kreuzlingen of 1. Liga on 28 January 2006. At the start of 2007–08 season, he scored 4 goals in a match against FC Chiasso on 4 August 2007. Which the match end at 5–2 win.

In 2019, he left Brühl after scoring 85 goals in 189 games for them and joined Young Fellows Juventus. He moved on to USV Eschen/Mauren in August 2020.
