= FC Rapperswil-Jona =

Swiss football club

- Full name: Fussball Club Rapperswil-Jona
- Founded: 1928; 98 years ago
- Ground: Stadion Grünfeld; Rapperswil
- Capacity: 2,500
- Chairman: Rocco Delli Colli
- Manager: Selcuk Sasivari
- League: Challenge League
- 2025–26: 6th of 10
- Website: www.fcrj.ch
Home colours	Away colours

Fussball Club Rapperswil-Jona is a Swiss football club based in Rapperswil, Switzerland. The team currently play in Challenge League from 2025–26, the second tier of Swiss football after promotion from Promotion League in 2024–25.

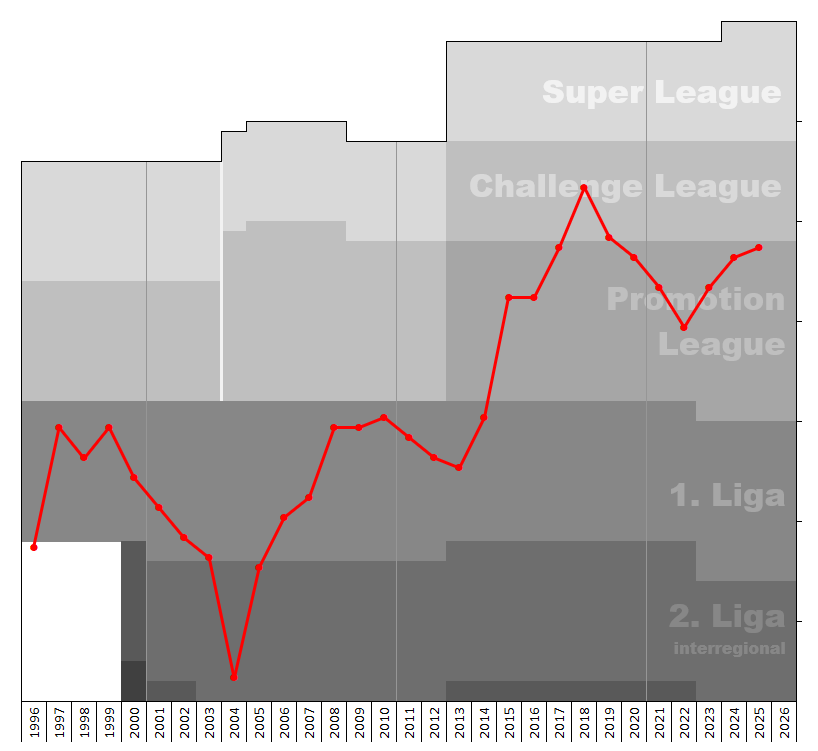
Chart of FC Rapperswil-Jona table positions in the Swiss football league system

== History ==
Rapperswil-Jona was founded in 1928 and is now the largest sports club in the Oberer Lake / Linth area.

After achieving promotion in June 2017, the first team played in Challenge League for the first time in their history.

On 25 May 2025, Rapperswil-Jona secured promotion to Challenge League, after beating Bavois 2–1 in final matchweek, thus returning to the second tier after six years of absence.

== Honours ==
- Promotion League
  - Winner : 2016–17, 2024–25

== Squad ==
As of 27 September 2026

Note: Flags indicate national team as defined under FIFA eligibility rules; some limited exceptions apply. Players may hold more than one non-FIFA nationality.

No.	Pos.	Nation	Player
1	GK	SUI	Cyrill Emch
3	DF	SUI	Bruno Morgado
4	DF	KOS	Ismajl Beka (on loan from Grasshopper)
5	MF	SUI	Adrian Durrer
6	MF	SUI	Lois Ndema
7	MF	SUI	Yannis Ryter
8	MF	KOS	Valon Hamdiu
9	FW	FRA	Noa Mupemba
10	MF	CIV	Salifou Diarrassouba (on loan from Grasshopper)
11	FW	SUI	Evan Rossier
13	DF	URU	Guillermo Padula
18	GK	SUI	Alan Omerovic
19	DF	SUI	Stevan Raicevic (on loan from Young Boys)
20	DF	FRA	Evann Senaya (on loan from Basel)
22	MF	MKD	Ilija Maslarov (on loan from Lugano)

No.	Pos.	Nation	Player
23	DF	SUI	Ruben Pousa
25	FW	PAR	Raúl Bobadilla
26	MF	FRA	Alexis Charveys
28	DF	CMR	Joseph Ambassa
30	GK	SUI	Arlind Doga
31	MF	KOS	Lorik Emini
37	DF	FRA	William Le Pogam
44	DF	SUI	Anthony Susnja
45	DF	SUI	Noah Gjokaj
47	MF	SUI	Malik Deme
48	DF	SUI	Dion Lecaj
49	FW	SUI	Davide Muzzi
54	MF	MKD	Muhamed Kurtishi (on loan from Basel)
93	FW	FRA	Axel Bakayoko

=== Out on loan ===
Note: Flags indicate national team as defined under FIFA eligibility rules; some limited exceptions apply. Players may hold more than one non-FIFA nationality.

No. / Pos. / Nation / Player; — / MF / SUI / Noé Boum (at Cham until 31 December 2026)	No. / Pos. / Nation / Player; — / FW / SUI / Alen Camdzic (at Kreuzlingen until 30 June 2027)
