= Paul-Grüninger-Stadion =

Football stadium in St. Gallen, Switzerland

Coordinates: 47.4339°N 9.4058°E

Paul-Grüninger-Stadion is a football stadium in St. Gallen, Switzerland. The stadium is named after Swiss police captain, football player, and Righteous Among the Nations Paul Grüninger. It is the home of SC Brühl and has a capacity of 4,200. The stadium had major renovations done during 2005 and 2006 and a new grandstand was erected. The grandstand has a capacity of 900 seats and the rest is 3,300 standing places.

== See also ==
- List of football stadiums in Switzerland
