= Promotion League =

- Founded: 2012; 14 years ago as 1. Liga Promotion; 2014; 12 years ago as Promotion League
- Country: Switzerland
- Confederation: UEFA
- Number of clubs: 18
- Level on pyramid: 3
- Promotion to: Challenge League
- Relegation to: 1st League Classic
- Domestic cup: Swiss Cup
- Current champions: SC Kriens (2nd title) (2025–26)
- Most championships: Rapperswil-Jona, Kriens (2 titles)
- Website: matchcenter.el-pl.ch
- Current: 2026–27 Promotion League

The Promotion League, named the Hoval Promotion League for sponsorship reasons, is the third tier of the Swiss football league system. Eighteen clubs compete in the league, playing each other twice over course of the season. The champions are promoted to the second tier, the Challenge League, while the bottom two teams are relegated to the 1st League Classic.

The league forms the semi-professional bridge to amateur football.

== Overview ==
Eighteen teams play each other twice, once home and once away, for a total of 34 games. The season begins in August and ends in May, interrupted through a winter break from late November to early March.

The team finishing in first place—subject to license requirements of professional football—will be promoted to the division above, in turn the last-placed team of the second division will be relegated for the following season. Similarly, the bottom two teams are relegated to the fourth tier and replaced respectively.

It is the highest league in Switzerland that permits participation of reserve teams.

== History ==
The league was introduced as the 1. Liga Promotion beginning with the 2012–13 season as part of a restructuring that saw the Challenge League reduced from 16 to 10 teams. This was done to decrease the competitive gap between it and the Super League by converting it to a purely professional league. The Promotion League would therefore serve as the semi-professional link to amateur football. The 1. Liga was consequently renamed to 1. Liga Classic, before reverting again in 2013 when the former adopted its current name. For its maiden season, six teams were relegated from the Challenge League, while the rest joined from the division below. In March 2020, the ongoing season was canceled after 17 games due to the COVID-19 pandemic and the 2020–21 season suspended until further notice.

The league was expanded to 18 teams for the 2022–23 season and the number of allowed U21 teams is unrestricted.

== Clubs ==
=== Current season ===
Location of the 2025–26 Promotion League teams

Club	Canton	Location	Stadium	Capacity
FC Basel II	(Basel-Stadt)	Basel	Stadion Rankhof; Youth Campus Basel	7,000; 1,000
FC Bavois	(Vaud)	Bavois	Stade de Peupliers	1,000
FC Biel-Bienne	(Canton of Bern)	Biel/Bienne	Tissot Arena	5,200
FC Breitenrain Bern	(Canton of Bern)	Bern	Spitalacker	1,500
SC Brühl	(Canton of St. Gallen)	St. Gallen	Paul-Grüninger-Stadion	4,200
FC Bulle	(Canton of Fribourg)	Bulle	Stade de Bouleyres	5,000
SC Cham	(Canton of Zug)	Cham	Stadion Eizmoos	1,800
FC Grand-Saconnex	(Canton of Geneva)	Le Grand-Saconnex	Stade du Blanché	1,000
FC Kreuzlingen	(Thurgau)	Kreuzlingen	EC Technik Remu Arena	1,200
SC Kriens	(Canton of Lucerne)	Kriens	Stadion Kleinfeld	5,360
FC Lausanne-Sport II	(Vaud)	Lausanne	Stade du Bois-Gentil	3,500
FC Lugano II	(Ticino)	Lugano	Cornaredo Stadium	6,330
FC Luzern II	(Canton of Lucerne)	Lucerne	Swissporarena; Allmend Sud	16,800; 2,000
FC Paradiso	(Ticino)	Paradiso	Campo Pian Scairolo	1,000
FC Schaffhausen	(Canton of Schaffhausen)	Schaffhausen	Berformance Arena	8,200
Vevey-Sports	(Vaud)	Vevey	Stade de Copet	5,000
BSC Young Boys II	(Canton of Bern)	Bern	Stadion Wankdorf	32,000
FC Zürich II	(Canton of Zurich)	Zurich	Sportplatz Heerenschürli	1,120

== League champions ==
The following teams have won the league:

Season	Club
As 1. Liga Promotion
2012–13	FC Schaffhausen
2013–14	FC Le Mont
As Promotion League
2014–15	Neuchâtel Xamax
2015–16	Servette FC
2016–17	FC Rapperswil-Jona
2017–18	SC Kriens
2018–19	Stade Lausanne Ouchy
2019–20	None (Note: The 2019–20 season was canceled due to the COVID-19 pandemic.)
2020–21	Yverdon-Sport FC
2021–22	AC Bellinzona (Note: Breitenrain was refused a license and withdrew its appeal alongside the license application. License holder and second-placed AC Bellinzona was promoted instead, but FC Breitenrain Bern was runner-up and AC Bellinzona crowned champions.)
2022–23	FC Luzern II (Note: FC Luzern II was originally promotion but reserve team ineligible for promotion. License holder, second and third place Stade Nyonnais and FC Baden was promoted instead.)
2023–24	Étoile Carouge FC
2024–25	FC Rapperswil-Jona
2025–26	SC Kriens
