= FC Bavois =

Swiss football club

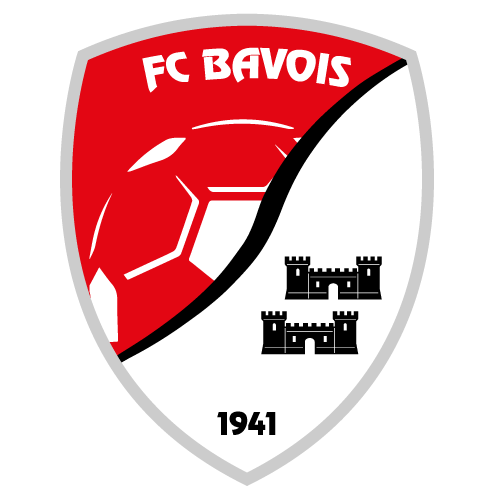
- Full name: Football Club Bavois
- Founded: 1941; 85 years ago
- Ground: Stade des Peupliers; Bavois
- Capacity: 1,000
- Chairman: Jean Michel Viquerat
- Manager: Bekim Uka
- League: Promotion League
- 2024–25: 11th of 18
Home colours	Away colours

Football Club Bavois are a football team from Bavois, Switzerland. The club plays in the Promotion League, the third tier of Swiss football.

== History ==
FC Bavois was founded in 1941.

Historical chart of the club's league performance

== Current squad ==
As of 20 September 2026

Note: Flags indicate national team as defined under FIFA eligibility rules; some limited exceptions apply. Players may hold more than one non-FIFA nationality.

No.	Pos.	Nation	Player
3	DF	GER	Ali Benelmir
4	MF	SUI	Matteo Fedele
5	DF	SUI	Tristan Diaz
6	MF	SUI	Aukan Moraga
7	DF	SUI	Alexandre Trabelsi
8	MF	ESP	José Aguilar
9	FW	SUI	Allan Eleouet
10	MF	SUI	Idriz Bega
11	MF	SUI	Fabio Morelli
13	GK	FRA	Maxime Brenet
15	MF	MKD	Kristijan Ivanov
16	MF	SUI	Elmedin Avdic

No.	Pos.	Nation	Player
17	FW	SUI	Jessé Hautier
19	MF	SUI	Fares Toumi
20	DF	FRA	Alexandre Nsakala
21	FW	FRA	Brayan Nzita
22	DF	POR	Miguel Rodrigues
23	DF	FRA	Oumar Sarr
24	FW	FRA	Ayoub Ouhafsa
25	DF	SUI	Luca Jaquenoud
26	GK	SUI	Julien Manière
27	FW	SUI	Logan Clément
29	FW	SUI	Darko Lötscher (on loan from FC Lausanne-Sport)
-	DF	CHI	Franco Luna

== Staff and board members ==
=== Management ===
- President: Jean Michel Viquerat
- Secretary: Philippe Cauderay

=== Sports ===
- Head coach: Bekim Uka
- Goalkeeper coach: Gilles Rod

=== Medical ===
- Masseur: Reynold Conod
- Masseur: Jean-Louis Durgniat
