= 2014–15 FC Aarau season =

FC Aarau
2014–15 season
- Chairman: Alfred Schmid
- Manager: Sven Christ
- Stadium: Stadion Brügglifeld
- Swiss Cup: Quarter-final

FC Aarau is a Swiss football club which are based in Aarau. during the 2014/15 campaign they will be participating in the Swiss Super League, Schweizer Pokal.

== Competitions ==
=== Friendly matches ===
==== Preseason ====
13 June 2014	FC Aarau (Switzerland)	2 – 3	(Switzerland) FC Schaffhausen	Suhr
16:30 CEST	Gygax 36'; N'Ganga 80'	(Report) (in German)	32' Miani; 34' Seferagić; 89' (pen.) Buqaj	Stadium: Hofstattmatten; Attendance: 200; Referee: Sascha Amhof

18 June 2014	FC Zürich (Switzerland)	2 – 1	(Switzerland) FC Aarau	Wangen bei Olten
19:00 CEST	Schönbächler 37'; Chermiti 87' (pen.)	(Report) (in German)	83' Franek	Stadium: Chrüzmatt; Attendance: 605; Referee: Pascal Erlachner

28 June 2014	FC Wohlen (Switzerland)	2 – 2	(Switzerland) FC Aarau	Niederwil AG
16:00 CEST	Josue 22'; Buess 60'	(Report) (in German)	18' Gauračs; 84' Senger	Stadium: Riedmatten; Attendance: 500; Referee: Nenad Skalonja

5 July 2014	FC Lugano (Switzerland)	2 – 2	(Switzerland) FC Aarau	Rivera
16:45 CEST	Rafael da Silva 42'; Sylla 68'	(Report) (in German)	15' Teichmann; 84' Gygax	Stadium: Quadrifoglio; Attendance: 200; Referee: Vladimir Ovcharov

8 July 2014	FC Aarau (Switzerland)	5 – 0	(Switzerland) FC Wil 1900	Gränichen
17:00 CEST	Burki 18'; Andrist 62'; Schultz 69'; Teichmann 89'; Foschini 90'	(Report) (in German)		Stadium: ZehnderMatte; Attendance: 248; Referee: Lukas Fähndrich

12 July 2014	FC Aarau (Switzerland)	2 – 0	(Switzerland) FC Baden	Aarau
17:45 CEST	Senger 33'; Burki 54'	(Report) (in German)		Stadium: Stadion Brügglifeld; Attendance: 750; Referee: Tomasz Superczynski

==== Mid-season (fall) ====
19 August 2014	SC Cham (Switzerland)	0 – 3	(Switzerland) FC Aarau	Cham
19:00 CEST		(Report) (in German)	31' Mickels; 61' Lugo; 70' Djurić	Stadium: Eizmoos; Attendance: 312; Referee: Roland Huwiler

5 September 2014	FC Aarau (Switzerland)	3 – 1	(Switzerland) FC Biel-Bienne	Aarau
17:30 CEST	Mudrinski 4', 50', 87'	(Report) (in German)	29' Safari	Stadium: Stadion Brügglifeld; Attendance: 200; Referee: Vladimir Ovcharov

10 October 2014	FC Aarau (Switzerland)	3 – 2	(Switzerland) FC Wil 1900	Aarau
17:00 CET	Mudrinski 37'; Andrist 47' (pen.); Djurić 63'	(Report) (in German)	19' Brown; 39' Berisa	Stadium: Stadion Brügglifeld; Attendance: 175; Referee: Sascha Amhof

13 November 2014	SC Freiburg (Germany)	3 – 1	(Switzerland) FC Aarau	Freiburg im Breisgau, Germany
14:30 CET	Schahin 23'; Freis 76'; Almpanis 78'	(Report) (in German)	72' Spielmann	Stadium: Möslestadion; Attendance: 400; Referee: Petersen

==== Winter break ====
14 January 2015	FC Aarau (Switzerland)	v	(Switzerland) FC Köniz	Aarau
18:30 CET				Stadium: Schachen

28 January 2015	BSC Old Boys (Switzerland)	v	(Switzerland) FC Aarau	Basel
19:00 CET				Stadium: Stadion Schützenmatte

31 January 2015	FC Aarau (Switzerland)	v	(Switzerland) FC Baden	Aarau
14:00 CET				Stadium: Schachen

3 February 2015	FC Wil 1900 (Switzerland)	1-0	(Switzerland) FC Aarau	Wil
14:00 CET				Stadium: IGP Arena

=== Swiss Super League ===
19 July 2014 Match 1	FC Aarau	1 – 2	Basel	Aarau
17:45	Schultz 85'	Summary	Embolo 15'; Aliji 38'; Ajeti (yellow card) 76'; Frei (yellow card) 78'	Stadium: Stadion Brügglifeld; Attendance: 3,644; Referee: (Switzerland) Nikolaj Hänni

23 July 2014 Match 2	FC Aarau	1 – 0	FC Sion	Aarau
19:45	Gauračs 84'	Summary	Lacroix (yellow card) 28'; Christofi (yellow card) 55'; Kouassi (yellow card) 60'	Stadium: Stadion Brügglifeld; Attendance: 3,790; Referee: (Switzerland) Stephan Studer

27 July 2014 Match 3	Young Boys	1 – 1	FC Aarau	Bern
13:45	Kubo 51'	Summary	Martignoni (yellow card) 17'; Senger 34'; Andrist (yellow card) 85'	Stadium: Stade de Suisse, Wankdorf; Attendance: 16,917; Referee: (Switzerland) Adrien Jaccottet

6 August 2014 Match 4	FC Aarau	1 – 1	Vaduz	Aarau
19:45	Senger 23'; Andrist (yellow card) 56'	Summary	Schürpf 80'	Stadium: Stadion Brügglifeld; Attendance: 4,985; Referee: (Switzerland) Adrien Jaccottet

9 August 2014 Match 5	St. Gallen	2 – 2	FC Aarau	St. Gallen
17:45	Čavušević 72'; Mutsch (yellow card) 80'; Bunjaku 83'	Summary	Marco Thaler (yellow card) 14'; Luca Radice 26'; Garat 66'; Andrist (yellow card) 90+3'	Stadium: AFG Arena; Attendance: 11,880; Referee: (Switzerland) Alain Bieri

16 August 2014 Match 6	FC Aarau	1 – 2	Grasshopper	Aarau
17:45	Garat 84'	Summary	Kahraba 6'; Salatić (yellow card) 44'; Ngamukol 80'; Lang (yellow card) 90+2'	Stadium: Stadion Brügglifeld; Attendance: 5,277; Referee: (Switzerland) Pascal Erlachner

30 August 2014 Match 7	FC Luzern	1 – 1	FC Aarau	Lucerne
20:00	Lezcano 33'	Summary	Djurić 65'	Stadium: Swissporarena; Attendance: 9,488; Referee: (Switzerland) Stephan Klossner

13 September 2014 Match 8	FC Aarau	2 – 1	Thun	Aarau
20:00	Luca Radice 44'; Wieser 85'; Burki (yellow card) 90+2'	Summary	Glarner (yellow card) 48'; Sadik 55'; Schirinzi (yellow card) 59'; Frontino (yellow card) 71'	Stadium: Stadion Brügglifeld; Attendance: 4,260; Referee: (Switzerland) Pascal Erlachner

24 September 2014 Match 9	Zürich	0 – 0	FC Aarau	Zürich
19:45	Djimsiti (yellow card) 16'; Chermiti (yellow card) 60'	Summary	Mall (yellow card) 87'	Stadium: Letzigrund; Attendance: 7,212; Referee: (Switzerland) Nikolaj Hänni

27 September 2014 Match 10	Grasshopper	2 – 1	FC Aarau	Zürich
17:45	Ravet 25'; Abrashi (yellow card) 35' (goal) 64'; Dingsdag (yellow card) 55'; Jahić (yellow card) 83'	Summary	Mlinar (yellow card) 12'; N'Ganga 74'; Marco Thaler (yellow card) 86'; Djurić (yellow card) 87'	Stadium: Letzigrund; Attendance: 4,000; Referee: (Switzerland) Sebastien Pache

5 October 2014 Match 11	FC Aarau	3 – 2	Young Boys	Aarau
16:00	Mlinar (yellow card) 5'; N'Ganga 28'; Andrist 59' 84'	Summary	Bertone 20' (yellow card) 71'; Steffen 30' (yellow card) 31'; Sanogo (yellow card) 34'	Stadium: Stadion Brügglifeld; Attendance: 5,184; Referee: (Switzerland) Adrien Jaccottet

18 October 2014 Match 12	FC Aarau	0 – 3	St. Gallen	Aarau
17:45	Jaggy (yellow card) 34'; Mlinar (yellow card) 52'; Burki (yellow card) 58'; Andrist (yellow card) 77'	Report	Tréand (yellow card) 28' (goal) 83'; Besle 44'; Bunjaku (yellow card) 66'; Tafer 76'	Stadium: Stadion Brügglifeld; Attendance: 4,848; Referee: (Switzerland) Stephan Klossner

25 October 2014 Match 13	Thun	0 – 0	FC Aarau	Thun
17:45	Schneuwly (yellow card) 81'; Hediger (yellow card) 89'	Report	Garat (yellow card) 15'; Djurić (yellow card) 18'	Stadium: Stockhorn Arena; Attendance: 5,421; Referee: (Switzerland) Sandro Schärer

2 November 2014 Match 14	FC Sion	2 – 2	FC Aarau	Sion, Switzerland
13:45	Carlitos (yellow card) 19'; Ndoye 29'; Jagne (yellow card) 31' (goal) 47'	Summary	Lüscher 5'; Wieser 22' (yellow card) 24'; Feltscher (yellow card) 31'; Andrist (yellow card) 63'	Stadium: Stade Tourbillon; Attendance: 8,200; Referee: (Switzerland) Nikolaj Hänni

9 November 2014 Match 15	FC Aarau	0 – 1	Zürich	Aarau
13:45 CET	Wieser (red card) 19'; Lüscher (yellow card) 31'; Jäckle (red card) 88'; Garat (yellow card) 90'	Summary	Elvedi 14'; Buff (yellow card) 22'; Kukeli (yellow card) 45+1'; Maurice Brunner (yellow card) 68'; Chikhaoui (yellow card) 72'	Stadium: Stadion Brügglifeld; Attendance: 6,261; Referee: (Austria) Rene Eisner

23 November 2014 Round 16	Basel	3 – 0	Aarau	St. Jakob-Park, Basel
13:45	Gashi 17', 86'; Díaz (yellow card) 56'; Embolo 90+1'	[ (Report)]	(yellow card) 39' Luca Radice; (yellow card) 77' Andrist	Attendance: 28,742; Referee: (Switzerland) Nikolaj Hänni

29 November 2014 Match 17	FC Aarau	0 – 3	FC Luzern	Aarau
17:45 CET	Andrist (yellow card) 14'; Jäckle (yellow card) 45+2'; Feltscher (yellow card) 77'	Summary	Schneuwly 28'; Jantscher (yellow card) 55'; Lezcano 67' (yellow card) 77'; Mobulu 87'	Stadium: Stadion Brügglifeld; Attendance: 4,830; Referee: (Switzerland) Alain Bieri

7 December 2014 Match 18	Vaduz	1 – 0	FC Aarau	Vaduz
13:45 CET	Grippo (yellow card) 7'; Neumayr 44' (yellow card) 45+4'; Diego Ciccone (yellow card) 72'; Ramon Cecchini (yellow card) 81'	Summary	N'Ganga (yellow card) 41'	Stadium: Rheinpark Stadion; Attendance: 3,427; Referee: (Switzerland) Studer

8 February 2015 Match 19	Thun	1 – 1	FC Aarau	Thun
13:45 CET	Rojas 68'; Wittwer (yellow card) 73'	Summary	Andrist (yellow card) 73'; Costanzo 75'	Stadium: Stockhorn Arena; Attendance: 4,628; Referee: (Switzerland) Nikolaj Hänni

15 February 2015 Match 20	FC Aarau	0 – 1	Vaduz	Aarau
13:45 CET	Burki (yellow card) 7' (yellow-red card); Garat (yellow card) 80'	Summary	Aliji (yellow card) 47'; Neumayr (yellow card) 68'; Schürpf 71' (yellow card) 90+5'	Stadium: Stadion Brügglifeld; Attendance: 3,778; Referee: (Switzerland) Pascal Erlachner

22 February 2015 Match 21	FC Luzern	4 – 0	FC Aarau	Lucerne
13:45 CET	Doubai (yellow card) 21'; Winter (yellow card) 34'; Freuler 38' (pen.); Jantscher (yellow card) 56'; Lezcano 69'; Schneuwly 72' 77'; Puljić (yellow card) 80'	Summary	Slišković (yellow card) 32'; Garat (yellow card) 54'	Stadium: Swissporarena; Attendance: 9,633; Referee: (Switzerland) Alain Bieri

28 February 2015 Match 22	Zürich	0 – 0	FC Aarau	Zürich
17:45 CET	Kajević (yellow card) 78'; Nef (yellow card) 86'; Kecojević (yellow card) 88'	Summary		Stadium: Letzigrund; Attendance: 7,403; Referee: (Switzerland) Nikolaj Hänni

8 March 2015 Match 23	FC Aarau	0 – 2	St. Gallen	Aarau
16:00 CET	Slišković (yellow card) 41'	Summary	Bunjaku 30'; Mathys (yellow card) 58'; Everton Bilher (yellow card) 76'; Rodríguez 90+2'	Stadium: Stadion Brügglifeld; Attendance: 4,368; Referee: (Switzerland) Stephan Klossner

15 March 2015 Match 24	FC Aarau	1 – 1	Young Boys	Aarau
13:45 CET	Slišković 5'; Djurić (red card) 20'; Burki (yellow card) 24'; Andrist (yellow card) 84'	Summary	Lecjaks (yellow card) 50'; Hoarau 87'	Stadium: Stadion Brügglifeld; Attendance: 5,041; Referee: (Switzerland) Adrien Jaccottet

21 March 2015 Match 25	Grasshopper	3 – 1	FC Aarau	Zürich
20:00 CET	Ravet 22'; Caio Alves 57'; Matteo Fedele (yellow card) 65'; Dabour 73'	Summary	Garat (yellow card) 43'; Slišković 48'; Burki (yellow card) 49'	Stadium: Letzigrund; Attendance: 5,700; Referee: (Switzerland) Nikolaj Hänni

4 April 2015 Match 26	Basel	6 – 0	Aarau	St. Jakob-Park, Basel
20:00	Delgado 6' (pen.), 36'; Streller 16', 33'; Gashi 22', 63'; Samuel (yellow card) 70'; Hamoudi (yellow card) 79'		(yellow card) 27' Lüscher; (yellow card) 71' Andrist	Attendance: 26,979; Referee: (Switzerland) Sandro Schärer

12 April 2015 Match 27	FC Aarau	0 – 1	FC Sion	Aarau
13:45 CET	Costanzo (yellow card) 33'; Burki (yellow card) 52'; Andrist (yellow card) 83'; Jaggy (yellow card) 90+4'	Summary	Herea (yellow card) 29'; Zverotić (yellow card) 42'; Carlitos (yellow card) 52'; Daniel Follonier 69'; Chadrac Akolo (yellow card) 87'	Stadium: Stadion Brügglifeld; Attendance: 4,306; Referee: (Switzerland) Sébastien Pache

19 April 2015 Match 28	Vaduz	0 – 2	FC Aarau	Vaduz
13:45 CET		Summary	Senger 32'; Jaggy (yellow card) 64'; N'Ganga (yellow card) 65'; Costanzo 90'	Stadium: Rheinpark Stadion; Attendance: 3,835; Referee: (Switzerland) Stephan Klossner

25 April 2015 Match 29	FC Aarau	0 – 0	Zürich	Aarau
17:45 CET	Luca Radice (yellow card) 87'	Summary	Cédric Brunner (yellow card) 18'; Mike Kleiber (yellow card) 59'; Rikan (yellow card) 81'	Stadium: Stadion Brügglifeld; Attendance: 3,384; Referee: (Switzerland) Nikolaj Hänni

29 April 2015 Match 30	Young Boys	2 – 2	FC Aarau	Bern
20:30 CET	Sanogo 48'; Zárate 51'	Summary	Luca Radice 35' 90+3'; Marco Thaler (yellow card) 69'	Stadium: Stade de Suisse; Attendance: 13,170; Referee: (Switzerland) Adrien Jaccottet

3 May 2015 Match 31	FC Aarau	2-6	FC Luzern	Aarau
13:45 CET	Marco Thaler (yellow card) 18'; Andrist 46'; Mall (yellow card) 53'; Slišković (yellow card) 55'; Feltscher 87'	Summary	Jantscher 23'; Schneuwly 38' 90+3'; Wiss (yellow card) 40'; Thiesson (yellow card) 54'; Winter 66'; Lezcano 76'; Freuler 78'	Stadium: Stadion Brügglifeld; Attendance: 4,963; Referee: (Switzerland) Sébastien Pache

8 May 2015 Match 32	FC Aarau	0 – 1	Grasshopper	Aarau
17:45	Costanzo (yellow card) 73'; Garat (yellow card) 82'	Summary	5' Dabbur; Wüthrich (yellow card) 28'; Grichting (yellow card) 52'	Stadium: Stadion Brügglifeld; Attendance: 5,104; Referee: (Switzerland) Stephan Studer

16 May 2015 Match 33	FC Sion	1-0	FC Aarau	Sion
20:00 CET	Konaté 21'; Vanczák (yellow card) 70'; Ziegler (yellow card) 78'; Edimilson Fernandes (yellow card) 90'	Summary	Garat (yellow card) 25'; N'Ganga (yellow card) 53'; Lüscher (yellow card) 81'; Marco Thaler (yellow card) 85'	Stadium: Stade Tourbillon; Attendance: 5,900; Referee: (Switzerland) Stephan Klossner

20 May 2015 Match 34	FC Aarau	2-1	Basel	Aarau
20:30 CET	Mohamed Elneny 5' (o.g.); Djurić 49'; Burki (yellow card) 71'; Jaggy (yellow card) 89'	Summary	Ajeti (yellow card) 42'; Samuel (yellow card) 61'; Embolo 62'	Stadium: Stadion Brügglifeld; Attendance: 4,551; Referee: (Austria) Robert Schörgenhofer

25 May 2015 Match 35	St. Gallen	5-1	FC Aarau	St. Gallen
16:00 CET	Karanović 16' 67' 70' 74'; Pascal Thrier (yellow card) 34'; Everton Luiz (yellow card) 37'; Michael Eisenring (yellow card) 51'; Čavušević 90'	Summary	Djurić (yellow card) 43'; Jäckle (yellow card) 46'; Garat (yellow card) 52'; Slišković 53'; Marco Thaler (yellow card) 74'	Stadium: AFG Arena; Attendance: 14,343; Referee: (Switzerland) Stephan Klossner

29 May 2015 Match 36	FC Aarau	v	Thun	Aarau
20:30 CET				Stadium: Stadion Brügglifeld

=== Swiss Cup ===
24 August 2014 Round 1	AC Taverne	1 - 7	FC Aarau	Rivera
15:30		Summary		Stadium: Quadrifoglio; Attendance: 500; Referee: (Switzerland) Tomasz Superczynski

20 September 2014 Round 2	FC Chiasso	0 - 1	FC Aarau	Chiasso
17:30	Diarra (yellow card) 4'; Djuric (yellow card) 8'; Mirko Quaresima (yellow card) 87'; Gaston Magnetti (yellow card) 90+4'; Mariano Hassell (yellow card) 90+6'	Summary	Luca Radice 90+3'	Stadium: Stadio Comunale; Attendance: 1,000; Referee: (Switzerland) Stephan Klossner

29 October 2014 Last 16	FC Luzern	1 - 2	FC Aarau	Lucerne
19:30 CET	Jantscher 10'; Lezcano (yellow card) 34'; Schneuwly (yellow card) 52'; Lustenberger (yellow card) 76'	Summary	Djurić 19'; Wieser 40' (yellow card) 78'; Garat (yellow card) 44'	Stadium: Swissporarena; Attendance: 6,145; Referee: (Switzerland) Alain Bieri

4 March 2015 Quarter Finals	Sion	1 - 2	FC Aarau	Sion
20:30 CET	Konaté 4'; Edimilson Fernandes 27'	Summary	Senger 90+4'	Stadium: Stade Tourbillon
