= 2012–13 Swiss Challenge League =

Swiss Challenge League
- Season: 2012–13
- Champions: Aarau
- Promoted: Aarau
- Relegated: Bellinzona
- Matches: 180
- Goals: 523 (2.91 per match)
- Top goalscorer: Armando Sadiku (20 goals)
- Biggest home win: Bellinzona 8–0 Wil
- Biggest away win: Locarno 0–5 Winterthur
- Highest scoring: Vaduz 5–3 Aarau; Aarau 5–3 Wohlen; Bellinzona 8–0 Wil; Locarno 2–6 Bellinzona
- Longest winning run: 6 games Aarau
- Longest unbeaten run: 14 games Bellinzona
- Longest winless run: 10 games Lugano
- Longest losing run: 7 games Locarno
- Highest attendance: 6,100; Aarau 3–3 Wohlen
- Lowest attendance: 203; Biel-Bienne 7–0 Wohlen
- Average attendance: 1,454

The 2012–13 Swiss Challenge League was the tenth season of the Swiss Challenge League, the second tier of the Swiss football league pyramid. It began on 14 July 2012 and ended on 2 June 2013.

== Teams ==
2011–12 Challenge League champions St. Gallen were promoted to the 2012–13 Super League. They weren't replaced by another team due to Neuchâtel Xamax being demoted to the 4th tier of Swiss football for financial irregularities. 2011–12 Challenge League runners-up Aarau had to compete in a promotion/relegation playoff against 9th-placed Super League team Sion and remained in the Challenge League after losing 3–1 on aggregate.

The bottom five teams – Stade Nyonnais, Étoile Carouge, Delémont, Kriens and Brühl – were relegated to the newly formed 1. Liga Promotion with no teams replaced them due to the Challenge League reducing from 16 to 10 teams.

Locations of the 2012–13 Challenge League clubs

Club	City	Stadium	2011–12 season
FC Aarau	Aarau, Aargau	Stadion Brügglifeld	2nd in Challenge League
AC Bellinzona	Bellinzona, Ticino	Stadio Comunale	3rd in Challenge League
FC Biel/Bienne	Biel/Bienne, Bern	Gurzelen Stadion	10th in Challenge League
FC Chiasso	Chiasso, Ticino	Stadio Comunale	7th in Challenge League
FC Locarno	Locarno, Ticino	Stadio del Lido	9th in Challenge League
FC Lugano	Lugano, Ticino	Cornaredo Stadium	5th in Challenge League
FC Vaduz	Vaduz, Liechtenstein	Rheinpark Stadion	8th in Challenge League
FC Wil 1900	Wil, St. Gallen	Stadion Bergholz	6th in Challenge League
FC Winterthur	Winterthur, Zürich	Stadion Schützenwiese	4th in Challenge League
FC Wohlen	Wohlen, Aargau	Stadion Niedermatten	11th in Challenge League

== League table ==
Pos	Team	Pld	W	D	L	GF	GA	GD	Pts	Qualification or relegation
1	Aarau (C)	36	24	6	6	76	40	+36	78	Promotion to 2013–14 Swiss Super League
2	Bellinzona (D, R)	36	21	8	7	62	37	+25	64	Relegation to 2013–14 1. Liga Promotion (Note: Due to financial irregularities, AC Bellinzona was discounted seven points and were ultimately relegated at the end of the season. FC Locarno was thus not relegated in spite of their last-place finish.)
3	Winterthur	36	19	5	12	61	43	+18	62	
4	Wil	36	15	6	15	59	65	−6	51	
5	Biel-Bienne	36	13	8	15	59	59	0	47	
6	Chiasso	36	13	8	15	42	51	−9	47	
7	Lugano	36	11	11	14	52	50	+2	44	
8	Wohlen	36	9	12	15	39	58	−19	39	
9	Vaduz	36	10	7	19	41	52	−11	37	Qualification for the Europa League first qualifying round
10	Locarno	36	5	9	22	32	68	−36	24	

Source: Swiss Challenge League (in German)
Rules for classification: 1) points; 2) goal difference; 3) number of goals scored.
(C) Champions; (D) Disqualified; (R) Relegated

== Results ==
Teams played each other four times (twice home and twice away) over the course of the season, home and away, for a total of 36 matches per team.

=== First and Second Round ===
Home \ Away	AAR	BEL	BB	CHI	LOC	LUG	VAD	WIL	WIN	WOH
Aarau		0–1	4–1	0–0	1–1	3–1	2–1	4–2	3–1	5–3
Bellinzona	1–2		3–2	1–0	2–1	3–1	1–0	2–3	1–5	1–0
Biel-Bienne	5–1	1–2		3–1	1–1	1–1	4–2	3–0	3–2	2–0
Chiasso	0–1	3–2	1–1		1–0	2–1	0–1	2–3	0–1	1–3
Locarno	0–1	0–2	2–2	1–3		0–3	0–1	0–3	0–5	1–0
Lugano	3–3	0–1	4–0	0–0	0–0		3–1	3–1	1–2	4–1
Vaduz	5–3	0–0	2–2	0–0	2–0	1–0		1–2	1–0	5–0
Wil	0–3	0–1	2–0	4–1	3–1	1–1	3–1		4–0	0–1
Winterthur	0–0	1–0	4–1	1–1	2–1	3–1	2–0	2–3		0–1
Wohlen	0–1	0–0	0–0	0–1	0–0	1–1	1–0	3–3	1–1	

Source: Swiss Challenge League (in German)
Legend: Blue = home team win; Yellow = draw; Red = away team win.

=== Third and Fourth Round ===
Home \ Away	AAR	BEL	BB	CHI	LOC	LUG	VAD	WIL	WIN	WOH
Aarau		0–1	6–0	1–0	3–0	3–2	1–0	2–1	3–1	3–3
Bellinzona	2–2		2–0	1–3	0–0	0–0	0–0	8–0	3–1	2–2
Biel-Bienne	0–2	0–1		5–2	4–0	0–1	2–1	1–2	2–4	7–0
Chiasso	2–1	1–1	2–0		3–1	0–2	2–1	2–2	0–1	0–3
Locarno	0–3	2–6	0–1	1–2		0–3	0–1	2–3	2–1	1–2
Lugano	0–2	4–3	1–2	2–0	1–1		3–3	2–3	0–2	2–0
Vaduz	1–3	1–2	0–0	1–2	0–3	0–1		0–2	1–1	1–2
Wil	0–1	2–3	0–1	0–1	2–2	1–1	2–3		1–0	1–2
Winterthur	1–0	0–2	2–2	3–1	2–3	2–1	2–0	3–0		1–0
Wohlen	1–3	0–1	1–0	2–2	2–2	1–1	1–3	0–0	0–2	

Source: Swiss Challenge League (in German)
Legend: Blue = home team win; Yellow = draw; Red = away team win.

== Season statistics ==
=== Top scorers ===
Rank	Player	Club	Goals
1	(Albania) Armando Sadiku	Lugano	20
2	(Switzerland) Davide Callà	Aarau	19
3	(Portugal) Luís Pimenta	Chiasso	14
4	(Cameroon) Patrick Bengondo	Winterthur	12
4	(Serbia) Kristian Kuzmanović	Winterthur	12
6	(Switzerland) Charles-André Doudin	Biel-Bienne	11
6	(Switzerland) Sven Lüscher	Winterthur / Aarau	11
6	(Italy) Giuseppe Morello	Biel-Bienne	11
6	(Albania) Drilon Pacarizi	Locarno	11
10	(Senegal) Matar Coly	Biel-Bienne	9
10	(Switzerland) Stefano Milani	Wohlen	9
10	(Cameroon) Landry Mouangue	Wil	9

=== Assists ===
Rank	Player	Club	Assists
1	(Germany) Markus Neumayr	Bellinzona	15
2	(Switzerland) Sven Lüscher	Winterthur / Aarau	14
3	(Switzerland) Davide Callà	Aarau	13
4	(Switzerland) Charles-André Doudin	Biel-Bienne	11
4	(Argentina) Dante Senger	Aarau	11
4	(Switzerland) Alain Schultz	Aarau	11
7	(Switzerland) Pascal Cerrone	Wil	9
7	(Senegal) Matar Coly	Biel-Bienne	9
7	(Switzerland) Steven Ukoh	Biel-Bienne	9
10	(Portugal) Carlos da Silva	Lugano	8
10	(Switzerland) Martin Steuble	Wil	8

=== Hat-tricks ===
Player	For	Against	Result	Date
(Senegal) Matar Coly	Biel-Bienne	Vaduz	4–2	19 August 2012
(North Macedonia) Adis Jahović	Wil	Chiasso	4–1	19 August 2012
(Switzerland) Davide Callà	Aarau	Wohlen	5–3	28 October 2012
(Serbia) Kristian Kuzmanović	Winterthur	Bellinzona	5–1	4 November 2012
(Italy) Giuseppe Morello	Biel-Bienne	Aarau	5–1	5 November 2012
(Cameroon) Landry Mouangue	Wil	Winterthur	4–0	2 December 2012
(Switzerland) Silvan Widmer	Aarau	Wohlen	3–1	1 April 2013
(Switzerland) Pascal Schürpf	Bellinzona	Wil	8–0	18 April 2013
(Nigeria) Sani Emmanuel	Biel-Bienne	Wohlen	7–0	12 May 2013

=== Scoring ===
- First goal of the season: Gezim Shalaj for Lugano against Wil (14 July 2012)
- Fastest goal of the season: Mirko Facchinetti for Chiasso against Bellinzona (27 August 2012)
- Largest winning margin: 8 goals
  - Bellinzona 8–0 Wil (18 April 2013)
- Highest scoring game: 8 goals
  - Vaduz 5–3 Aarau (6 August 2012)
  - Aarau 5–3 Wohlen (28 October 2012)
  - Bellinzona 8–0 Wil (18 April 2013)
  - Locarno 2–6 Bellinzona (8 May 2013)
- Most goals scored by a single team: 8 goals
  - Bellinzona 8–0 Wil (18 April 2013)
- Most goals scored by a losing team: 3 goals
  - Vaduz 5–3 Aarau (6 August 2012)
  - Aarau 5–3 Wohlen (28 October 2012)
  - Lugano 4–3 Bellinzona (2 June 2013)

=== Clean sheets ===
- Most clean sheets: 15
  - Bellinzona
- Fewest clean sheets: 4
  - Locarno

=== Discipline ===
- Most yellow cards (club): 86
  - Chiasso
- Most yellow cards (player): 14
  - Pietro Di Nardo (Biel-Bienne)
- Most red cards (club): 10
  - Chiasso
- Most red cards (player): 2
  - Marko Bašić (Lugano)
  - Igor Djuric (Chiasso)
  - Cha Jong-Hyok (Wil)
  - Charles-André Doudin (Biel-Bienne)
  - Emiliano Dudar (Chiasso)
  - Pavel Pergl (Bellinzona)
  - Mirko Quaresima (Chiasso)
