= Joël Mall =

Cypriot footballer (born 1991)

Personal information
- Full name: Joël Yves Mall
- Date of birth: 5 April 1991 (age 35)
- Place of birth: Baden, Switzerland
- Height: 1.96 m (6 ft 5 in)
- Position: Goalkeeper

Team information
- Current team: BSC Young Boys
- Number: 1

Youth career
- 2005–2008: Aarau

Senior career*
Years	Team	Apps	(Gls)
2008–2015	Aarau	114	(0)
2015–2017	Grasshopper	35	(0)
2017–2018	Darmstadt 98	5	(0)
2018–2019	Pafos	27	(0)
2019–2021	Apollon Limassol	23	(0)
2021	AEK Larnaca	16	(0)
2021–2023	Olympiakos Nicosia	64	(0)
2023–2026	Servette	79	(0)
2026–	BSC Young Boys	1	(0)

International career^{‡}
2011–2012	Switzerland U20	5	(0)
2023–	Cyprus	20	(0)
- * Club domestic league appearances and goals as of 26 July 2026 ‡ National team caps and goals as of 18 November 2025 (UTC)

Joël Yves Mall (Greek: Τζόελ Μαλ; born 5 April 1991) is a professional footballer who plays as a goalkeeper for Swiss Super League side BSC Young Boys. Born in Switzerland, he plays for the Cyprus national team after gaining citizenship in 2023.

== Club areer ==
Mall was under contract with Aarau and was used there from the 2008–09 season for the reserve team in the 5th division. He made his professional debut in the top flight on 21 March 2010 in an away game against Neuchâtel Xamax, lost 2–1. At the beginning of the 2011–12 season, with Aarau playing in the Swiss Challenge League, he ousted Sascha Studer as the first-choice goalkeeper.

Mall attracted media attention in November 2014 when he pulled off a double save in a game against Zürich. Zürich were awarded a penalty which was taken by Amine Chermiti. Mall saved the initial shot but it rebounded back to Chermiti who shot again, which was saved by Mall as well. Chermiti then had a third shot at goal, but it was acrobatically cleared off the line by defender Igor N'Ganga.

In June 2015, Mall moved from Super League relegated Aarau to record champions Grasshopper on a two-year contract.

On 1 June 2017, Mall moved from Grasshopper to 2. Bundesliga side Darmstadt 98. He made his first competitive appearance for the club in a 4–3 home defeat against 1. FC Nürnberg on 16 October 2017, after first-choice goalkeeper Daniel Heuer Fernandes broke his finger in training. Following Heuer Fernandes' recovery, Mall injured his own shoulder which relegated him to the role of third-choice goalkeeper by the end of the season.

This eventually saw a move to Cyprus for Pafos in 2018, and a year later, he moved to league rivals Apollon Limassol. He then joined AEK Larnaca in early 2021 and Olympiakos Nicosia in mid-year.

On 21 June 2023, he returned to Switzerland, joining previous season's runners-up Servette. He made his first team debut in the second leg of Servette's UEFA Champions League qualifying match away against Genk, coming on in the 59th minute to replace injured Jérémy Frick. Mall made seven saves during the remainder of the game, which was instrumental in getting his team into a penalty shoot-out with a score of 2–2 after extra time, as Genk were unable to score against Mall. In the shoot-out, two Genk shooters missed the goal and Servette qualified for the third round of Champions League qualifying against Glasgow Rangers.

On 2 June 2024, in the final of the 2023–24 Swiss Cup against Lugano, with the game tied at 0–0, he was subbed on in the 119th minute of the game, just ahead of the penalty shoot-out. Mall would emerge as the hero in the shoot-out, saving three penalties and converting the penultimate penalty, and winning Servette's first cup title in 23 years.

On 4 May 2026, Servette announced Mall would depart the club at the end of the season, after totalling 92 appearances in three seasons. On 22 May, BSC Young Boys announced his signing of Mall.

== International career ==
Mall is a former youth international for Switzerland, and appeared for the Switzerland U20 team.

On 1 June 2023, after being awarded the country's citizenship, he was called up to the Cyprus national team. On 17 June 2023, he made his debut in a 2–1 loss against Georgia in UEFA Euro 2024 qualifying. He played his second senior international game on 20 June 2023, a 3–1 loss to Norway.

== Career statistics ==
=== Club ===
As of match played 26 July 2026

Appearances and goals by club, season and competition
Club	Season	League			National cup (Note: Includes Swiss Cup, Cypriot Cup)		Continental		Other		Total	
Club	Season	Division	Apps	Goals	Apps	Goals	Apps	Goals	Apps	Goals	Apps	Goals
Aarau	2009–10	Swiss Super League	2	0	0	0	—		—		2	0
Aarau	2010–11	Swiss Challenge League	0	0	0	0	—		—		0	0
Aarau	2011–12	Swiss Challenge League	28	0	2	0	—		—		30	0
Aarau	2012–13	Swiss Challenge League	34	0	4	0	—		—		38	0
Aarau	2013–14	Swiss Super League	16	0	1	0	—		—		17	0
Aarau	2014–15	Swiss Super League	34	0	0	0	—		—		34	0
Aarau	Total		114	0	7	0	—		—		121	0
Grasshoper	2015–16	Swiss Super League	19	0	1	0	—		—		20	0
Grasshoper	2016–17	Swiss Super League	16	0	2	0	5 (Note: Appearance(s) in UEFA Europa League)	0	—		23	0
Grasshoper	Total		35	0	3	0	5	0	—		43	0
Darmstadt 98	2017–18	2. Bundesliga	5	0	0	0	—		—		5	0
Pafos	2018–19	Cypriot First Division	27	0	5	0	—		—		32	0
Apollon Limassol	2019–20	Cypriot First Division	20	0	2	0	8	0	—		30	0
Apollon Limassol	2020–21	Cypriot First Division	3	0	0	0	1	0	—		4	0
Apollon Limassol	Total		23	0	2	0	9	0	—		34	0
AEK Larnaca	2020–21	Cypriot First Division	16	0	—		—		—		16	0
Olympiakos Nicosia	2021–22	Cypriot First Division	30	0	2	0	—		—		32	0
Olympiakos Nicosia	2022–23	Cypriot First Division	34	0	5	0	—		—		39	0
Olympiakos Nicosia	Total		64	0	7	0	—		—		71	0
Servette	2023–24	Swiss Super League	26	0	2	0	3 (Note: Appearances in UEFA Champions League)	0	—		31	0
Servette	2024–25	Swiss Super League	25	0	1	0	1 (Note: Appearance in UEFA Conference League)	0	—		27	0
Servette	2025–26	Swiss Super League	28	0	0	0	6 (Note: Two appearances in UEFA Champions League, two appearances in UEFA Europa League, two appearances in UEFA Conference League)	0	—		34	0
Servette	Total		79	0	3	0	10	0	—		92	0
Young Boys	2026–27	Swiss Super League	1	0	1	0	—		—		2	0
Career total			364	0	28	0	24	0	0	0	416	0

=== International ===
As of match played 18 November 2025

Appearances and goals by national team and year
National team	Year	Apps	Goals
Cyprus	2023	7	0
Cyprus	2024	7	0
Cyprus	2025	6	0
Total		20	0

== Honours ==
Servette FC

- Swiss Cup: 2023–24
