= 2006–07 Swiss Challenge League =

The 2006–07 Swiss Challenge League was the fourth season of the Swiss Challenge League, the second tier of the Swiss football league pyramid. It began on 21 July 2006 and ended on 26 May 2007. The champions of this season, Neuchâtel Xamax, earned promotion to the 2007–08 Super League. The bottom tho teams, FC Baulmes and YF Juventus, were relegated to the 1. Liga.

== League table ==
Pos	Team	Pld	W	D	L	GF	GA	GD	Pts	Promotion or relegation
1	Neuchâtel Xamax (C, P)	34	23	7	4	73	28	+45	76	Promotion to 2007–08 Swiss Super League
2	Bellinzona	34	21	7	6	58	26	+32	70	Qualification for Promotion play-off
3	Kriens	34	20	7	7	65	36	+29	67	
4	Chiasso	34	16	10	8	55	39	+16	58	
5	Concordia Basel	34	17	6	11	59	49	+10	57	
6	Winterthur	34	17	4	13	60	47	+13	55	
7	Servette	34	15	8	11	63	51	+12	53	
8	Wil	34	12	10	12	56	50	+6	46	
9	Vaduz	34	12	10	12	57	52	+5	46	
10	Chaux-de-Fonds	34	12	7	15	49	49	0	43	
11	Locarno	34	11	9	14	44	58	−14	42	
12	Yverdon-Sport	34	12	6	16	45	60	−15	42	
13	Lugano	34	11	8	15	42	46	−4	41	
14	Lausanne Sports	34	10	9	15	44	51	−7	39	
15	Delémont	34	9	6	19	39	63	−24	33	
16	Wohlen	34	7	10	17	39	64	−25	31	
17	Baulmes (R)	34	7	9	18	30	63	−33	30	Relegated to 2007–08 Swiss 1. Liga
18	YF Juventus (R)	34	4	7	23	29	75	−46	19	Relegated to 2007–08 Swiss 1. Liga

(C) Champions; (P) Promoted; (R) Relegated

== Promotion/relegation playoff ==
As 9th-placed team of the 2006–07 Swiss Super League FC Aarau played a two-legged play-off against Challenge League runners-up AC Bellinzona for a spot in the 2007–08 Super League.

30 May 2007
20:15 CEST

Bellinzona	1–2	Aarau
Gomes 47'		Rogério 21'; Mesbah 36'

Stadio Comunale, Bellinzona
Attendance: 7,537
Referee: (Switzerland) Claudio Circhetta

3 June 2007
16:00 CEST

Aarau	3–1	Bellinzona
Mesbah 68', 89'; Sermeter 90+1'		Ianu 52'

Stadion Brügglifeld, Aarau
Attendance: 9,250
Referee: (Switzerland) Guido Wildhaber

Aarau won 5–2 on aggregate and retain their place in the Swiss Super League. Bellinzona remain in the Swiss Challenge League.

== Top scorers ==
		Player	Team	Goals	Penalty kick
1	(Switzerland)	Moreno Merenda	Neuchâtel Xamax	22	4
2	(Romania)	Cristian Ianu	Bellinzona	19	0
3	(Argentina)	Raúl Bobadilla	Concordia Basel	18	0
4	(Nigeria)	Ikechukwu Kalu	Chiasso	15	0
	(France)	Sid-Ahmed Bouziane	Chaux-de-Fonds	15	5
6	(Switzerland)	Julián Estéban	Servette	14	2
	(France)	Kamel Boughanem	Lugano	14	3
8	(Nigeria)	Saidu Alade Adeshina	Bellinzona	13	3
	(Senegal)	Matar Coly	Neuchâtel Xamax	13	1
10	(Argentina)	Dante Senger	Locarno	12	1
	(Croatia)	Tomo Barlecaj	Winterthur	12	0
	(Senegal)	Pape Omar Faye	Vaduz	12	0
	(Serbia)	Samel Šabanović	Wil	12	0
14	(Switzerland)	Boban Maksimović	Winterthur	11	6
	(Brazil)	Gelson Rodrigues	Chiasso	11	0
	(Italy)	Alessandro Iandoli	Concordia Basel	11	7
	(Argentina)	Juan Manuel Sara	Vaduz (until January)	11	1
18	(Portugal)	Bruno Valente	Chaux-de-Fonds	10	0
	(Switzerland)	Sven Lüscher	Kriens	10	2
20	(Italy)	Giuseppe Nocita	Kriens	9	0
	(Switzerland)	Marco Schneuwly	Kriens	9	0
	(France)	Geoffrey Tréand	Servette	9	2
	(Brazil)	Piu	Kriens	9	0
	(France)	Mouellé Koum	Yverdon	9	0
	(Germany)	Ifet Taljević	Wil	9	3
	(Italy)	Dario Drago	Baulmes	9	0
	(Albania)	Kristian Nushi	Wil	9	0
	(France)	Johnny Szlykowicz	SR Delémont; Neuchâtel Xamax	9	0
