= 2013–14 Swiss Challenge League =

Swiss Challenge League
- Season: 2013–14
- Champions: Vaduz
- Promoted: Vaduz
- Relegated: Locarno
- Matches: 180
- Goals: 520 (2.89 per match)
- Top goalscorer: Patrick Rossini (22 goals)
- Biggest home win: Biel-Bienne 6–2 Wohlen; Vaduz 4–0 Winterthur
- Biggest away win: Locarno 1–4 Winterthur; 0–3 7 games
- Highest scoring: Wil 6–3 Winterthur

The 2013–14 Swiss Challenge League (known for sponsorship reasons as the Brack.ch Challenge League) was the 11th season of the Swiss Challenge League, the second tier in the Swiss football pyramid. It began on 13 July 2013 and ended on 18 May 2014.

== Teams ==
2012–13 Challenge League champions Aarau were promoted to the 2013–14 Super League. Due to financial irregularities, Bellinzona was ultimately relegated at the end of the season and later dissolved. Locarno was spared from relegation.

The bottom five teams – Stade Nyonnais, Étoile Carouge, Delémont, Kriens and Brühl – were relegated to the newly formed 1. Liga Promotion. No teams replaced them due to the Challenge League being reduced from 16 to 10 teams.

Locations of clubs in the 2013–14 Challenge League

Team	Coach	Stadium	Capacity
FC Biel-Bienne	Hans-Peter Zaugg	Stadion Gurzelen	3,000
FC Chiasso	Ryszard Komornicki	Stadio Communale	11,168
FC Locarno	Stefano Maccoppi	Stadio Lido	6,600
FC Lugano	Sandro Salvioni	Stadio Cornaredo	6,900
FC Schaffhausen^{1}	Maurizio Jacobacci	Stadion Breite	7,300
Servette FC^{2}	Jean-Michel Aeby	Stade de Genève	30,000
FC Vaduz	Giorgio Contini	Rheinpark Stadion	6,078
FC Winterthur	Boro Kuzmanovic	Schützenwiese	8,500
FC Wil 1900	Axel Thoma	Sportpark Bergholz	6,000
FC Wohlen	David Sesa	Niedermatten	3,624

^{1} Promoted from the 1. Liga Promotion

^{2} Relegated from the Raiffeisen Super League

== League table ==
Pos	Team	Pld	W	D	L	GF	GA	GD	Pts	Promotion or relegation
1	Vaduz (C, P)	36	21	10	5	71	34	+37	73	Qualification for the Europa League first qualifying round and promotion to 2014–15 Swiss Super League
2	Lugano	36	19	7	10	55	46	+9	64	
3	Wil	36	18	9	9	74	45	+29	63	
4	Schaffhausen	36	18	8	10	57	40	+17	62	
5	Servette	36	18	7	11	49	48	+1	61	
6	Winterthur	36	11	9	16	45	50	−5	42	
7	Biel-Bienne	36	9	10	17	56	68	−12	37	
8	Chiasso	36	7	12	17	35	52	−17	33	
9	Wohlen	36	7	11	18	47	67	−20	32	
10	Locarno (R)	36	5	11	20	31	70	−39	26	Relegation to 2014–15 1. Liga Promotion

Source: Swiss Challenge League (in German)
Rules for classification: 1) points; 2) goal difference; 3) number of goals scored.
(C) Champions; (P) Promoted; (R) Relegated

== Results ==
Teams played each other twice over the course of the season, home and away, for a total of 36 matches per team.

=== First and Second Round ===
Home \ Away	BB	CHI	LOC	LUG	SHA	SER	VAD	WIL	WIN	WOH
Biel-Bienne		1–0	4–1	1–3	0–1	1–1	0–3	0–2	2–1	6–2
Chiasso	2–0		0–0	1–3	1–2	1–2	0–1	0–3	1–0	2–2
Locarno	1–0	1–1		0–0	0–3	0–4	1–1	0–3	1–4	0–0
Lugano	1–1	0–0	0–2		3–1	0–2	0–0	2–1	0–3	2–1
Schaffhausen	1–1	1–0	4–0	2–4		3–0	1–1	2–0	2–1	2–2
Servette	3–1	2–0	0–0	4–1	2–1		0–1	0–1	1–0	1–0
Vaduz	4–1	3–1	3–0	2–1	1–1	0–0		3–1	4–0	4–1
Wil	1–2	0–0	3–0	1–2	0–3	2–2	2–1		6–3	5–2
Winterthur	1–0	1–0	3–2	3–2	2–0	1–1	1–3	1–2		1–0
Wohlen	2–4	3–1	0–4	1–1	2–3	1–2	1–1	1–1	0–3	

Source: Swiss Challenge League (in German)
Legend: Blue = home team win; Yellow = draw; Red = away team win.

=== Third and Fourth Round ===
Home \ Away	BB	CHI	LOC	LUG	SHA	SER	VAD	WIL	WIN	WOH
Biel-Bienne		2–2	2–2	1–2	1–2	0–3	2–1	1–1	2–2	2–1
Chiasso	2–0		4–1	2–1	2–0	1–4	0–2	0–0	0–0	0–0
Locarno	1–1	1–4		0–3	0–1	0–1	1–1	2–6	2–2	2–0
Lugano	4–4	2–0	2–2		2–1	2–0	3–2	1–4	1–0	2–1
Schaffhausen	3–2	2–1	2–1	0–1		3–0	0–2	2–3	2–0	1–1
Servette	2–1	1–1	1–0	1–0	1–3		2–3	2–1	0–0	1–5
Vaduz	3–1	5–2	1–0	2–0	1–1	2–0		2–2	3–2	3–0
Wil	5–4	3–0	1–2	0–1	0–0	6–1	2–0		1–0	3–1
Winterthur	2–2	1–1	2–1	0–1	1–1	1–2	3–1	0–0		0–2
Wohlen	0–3	2–2	3–0	0–2	1–0	5–0	1–1	2–2	1–0	

Source: Swiss Challenge League (in German)
Legend: Blue = home team win; Yellow = draw; Red = away team win.

=== Top scorers ===
Rank	Player	Club	Goals
1	(Switzerland) Patrick Rossini	Schaffhausen	22
2	(Portugal) João Paiva	Wohlen	16
3	(Switzerland) Marco Aratore	Winterthur	14
4	(Switzerland) Gianluca Frontino	Schaffhausen	13
5	(Switzerland) Ivan Audino	Wil	12
5	(Austria) Manuel Sutter	Vaduz	12
6	(Germany) Markus Neumayr	Vaduz	11
6	(North Korea) Pak Kwang-Ryong	Vaduz	11
6	(Switzerland) Igor Tadić	Servette	11
6	(France) Geoffrey Tréand	Servette	11

== Awards ==
Swiss Football League Awards 2013
Award	Winner	Club
Best Player	(Switzerland) Patrick Rossini	FC Schaffhausen
«Mon joueur» Fans' Player of the Year	(Switzerland) Roman Buess	FC Locarno

Brack.ch Challenge League Dream Team 2013
Position	Player	Club
Goalkeeper	(Liechtenstein) Peter Jehle	FC Wil
Defender	(Switzerland) Nick von Niederhäusern	FC Winterthur
Defender	(Kosovo) Granit Lekaj	FC Wil
Defender	(Germany) Niklas Dams	FC Wohlen
Defender	(Switzerland) Pascal Cerone	FC Lugano
Midfielder	(France) Geoffrey Tréand	FC Lugano
Midfielder	(Switzerland) Gianluca Frontino	FC Schaffhausen
Midfielder	(Germany) Markus Neumayr	FC Aarau
Midfielder	(Switzerland) Marco Aratore	FC Aarau
Forward	(Switzerland) Patrick Rossini	FC Locarno
Forward	(Albania) Armando Sadiku	FC Lugano
