= Juan Garat =

Juan Garat may refer to:

- Juan Garat (tennis) (born 1973), Argentine tennis player
- Juan Pablo Garat (born 1983), Argentine footballer
