= 2010–11 Swiss Challenge League =

Swiss Challenge League
- Season: 2010–11
- Champions: FC Lausanne-Sport; 1st Challengue League title
- Promoted: FC Lausanne-Sport
- Relegated: Schaffhausen; Yverdon-Sport
- Matches: 240
- Goals: 743 (3.1 per match)
- Top goalscorer: Michael Rodriguez (18)
- Biggest home win: Biel-Bienne 7–0 Kriens
- Biggest away win: Lugano 0–6 Servette
- Highest scoring: Biel-Bienne 7–1 Aarau; Aarau 5–3 Biel-Bienne; Servette 6-2 Schaffhausen

The 2010–11 Swiss Challenge League was the eighth season of the Swiss Challenge League, the second tier of the Swiss football league pyramid. It began on 23 July 2010 and ended on 25 May 2011. The champions of this season, FC Lausanne-Sport, earned promotion to the 2011–12 Super League. The runners-up Servette won the promotion/relegation playoff against the 9th-placed team of the 2010–11 Super League, AC Bellinzona. The bottom two teams, FC Schaffhausen and Yverdon-Sport FC, were relegated to the 1. Liga.

== Teams ==
2009–10 Challenge League champions FC Thun were promoted to the 2010–11 Super League. They were replaced by FC Aarau, who were relegated after finishing the 2009–10 Super League in last place. 2009–10 Challenge League runners-up FC Lugano had to compete in a promotion/relegation playoff against 9th-placed Super League team AC Bellinzona and eventually retained their league spot after losing 1–2 on aggregate.

FC Le Mont as 15th-placed team and last-placed FC Gossau were relegated after the 2009–10 season. They were replaced by FC Chiasso and SR Delémont, who emerged victorious from the eight-team 1. Liga promotion playoff.

Locations of clubs in the 2010–11 Challenge League

Club	City	Stadium	2009–10 season
FC Aarau	Aarau	Stadion Brügglifeld	10th in Super League
FC Biel/Bienne	Biel/Bienne, Bern	Gurzelen Stadion	7th in Challenge League
FC Chiasso	Chiasso, Ticino	Stadio Comunale	1. Liga playoff winners
SR Delémont	Delémont, Jura	La Blancherie	1. Liga playoff winners
SC Kriens	Kriens, Lucerne	Stadion Kleinfeld	5th in Challenge League
FC Lausanne-Sport	Lausanne, Vaud	Stade Olympique de la Pontaise	10th in Challenge League
FC Locarno	Locarno, Ticino	Stadio del Lido	13th in Challenge League
FC Lugano	Lugano, Ticino	Cornaredo Stadium	2nd in Challenge League
FC Schaffhausen	Schaffhausen	Stadion Breite	11th in Challenge League
Servette FC	Geneva	Stade de Genève	4th in Challenge League
FC Stade Nyonnais	Nyon, Vaud	Centre sportif de Colovray Nyon	14th in Challenge League
FC Vaduz	Vaduz, Liechtenstein	Rheinpark Stadion	8th in Challenge League
FC Wil 1900	Wil, St. Gallen	Stadion Bergholz	6th in Challenge League
FC Winterthur	Winterthur, Zürich	Stadion Schützenwiese	3rd in Challenge League
FC Wohlen	Wohlen, Aargau	Stadion Niedermatten	12th in Challenge League
FC Yverdon-Sport	Yverdon-les-Bains, Vaud	Stade Municipal	9th in Challenge League

== League table ==
Pos	Team	Pld	W	D	L	GF	GA	GD	Pts	Promotion or relegation
1	Lausanne-Sport (C, P)	30	20	5	5	67	28	+39	65	Promotion to 2011–12 Swiss Super League
2	Servette (O, P)	30	19	5	6	75	27	+48	62	Qualification for promotion/relegation playoffs
3	Lugano	30	20	2	8	56	35	+21	62	
4	Vaduz	30	19	3	8	59	41	+18	60	Qualification for Europa League second qualifying round (Note: Vaduz as winners of the 2010–11 Liechtenstein Cup qualified for the second qualifying round of the 2011–12 UEFA Europa League.)
5	Wil	30	14	4	12	45	42	+3	46	
6	Stade Nyonnais	30	13	7	10	48	51	−3	46	
7	Chiasso	30	12	5	13	34	37	−3	41	
8	Delémont	30	12	4	14	47	60	−13	40	
9	Biel-Bienne	30	11	6	13	57	57	0	39	
10	Wohlen	30	9	10	11	45	44	+1	37	
11	Aarau	30	9	9	12	39	51	−12	36	
12	Kriens	30	9	6	15	26	50	−24	33	
13	Winterthur	30	8	8	14	42	51	−9	32	
14	Locarno	30	8	7	15	40	52	−12	31	
15	Schaffhausen (R)	30	7	5	18	36	53	−17	26	Relegation to 2011–12 Swiss 1. Liga
16	Yverdon-Sport (R)	30	6	2	22	27	64	−37	20	Relegation to 2011–12 Swiss 1. Liga

Source: Swiss Football League
Rules for classification: 1) points; 2) goal difference; 3) number of goals scored.
(C) Champions; (O) Play-off winners; (P) Promoted; (R) Relegated

== Results ==
Home \ Away	AAR	BB	CHI	DEL	KRI	LS	LOC	LUG	SHA	SER	SN	VAD	WIL	WIN	WOH	YS
Aarau		5–3	0–0	2–3	0–1	2–1	2–0	2–0	1–1	0–0	0–4	2–3	1–2	1–0	2–0	2–1
Biel-Bienne	7–1		2–1	3–2	7–0	0–4	0–2	2–3	2–1	0–5	5–0	0–4	1–1	3–1	0–3	3–1
Chiasso	1–1	1–2		1–3	0–0	1–2	1–2	0–2	1–0	2–1	3–0	0–1	2–1	1–1	4–1	2–1
Delémont	3–3	2–1	3–0		1–1	1–3	1–0	1–3	3–2	0–3	1–1	1–1	1–0	1–3	2–1	2–4
Kriens	0–1	3–1	0–2	0–2		1–3	1–1	0–1	1–0	1–1	1–1	0–1	1–3	2–1	2–0	1–0
Lausanne-Sport	2–2	3–2	2–1	2–1	4–1		5–2	3–1	4–0	0–2	1–1	2–0	2–0	4–0	1–2	3–0
Locarno	1–1	2–2	0–1	3–2	3–0	1–1		1–2	3–1	3–2	1–0	1–3	1–1	4–1	0–0	2–3
Lugano	1–0	2–2	4–1	3–0	2–0	1–2	2–0		2–1	0–6	1–2	2–1	2–1	2–3	1–1	2–1
Schaffhausen	2–2	1–2	0–2	0–1	0–0	1–1	2–1	1–2		1–0	2–3	2–1	1–3	2–1	2–1	0–1
Servette	4–2	2–0	3–0	4–1	6–0	1–2	4–1	0–2	6–2		3–1	3–1	2–0	3–3	3–0	3–1
Stade Nyonnais	3–0	1–1	1–0	2–1	2–0	0–5	5–2	0–1	1–4	0–1		2–5	0–3	3–3	3–2	1–0
Vaduz	2–0	1–1	1–0	6–1	2–1	1–0	2–1	0–3	1–0	1–4	1–5		3–1	3–0	0–5	5–1
Wil	1–0	3–2	1–2	3–1	2–1	0–2	3–1	2–1	2–1	0–0	2–2	1–2		2–1	0–3	3–1
Winterthur	1–2	1–0	1–2	1–2	1–3	1–2	2–0	2–1	0–0	3–1	0–0	1–1	3–1		2–2	1–2
Wohlen	2–2	1–1	1–1	3–0	1–2	2–1	0–0	0–3	5–2	0–0	1–2	1–3	2–1	1–1		2–1
Yverdon-Sport	2–0	0–2	0–1	1–4	1–2	0–0	2–1	0–4	0–4	0–2	1–2	0–3	0–2	0–3	2–2	

Source: Swiss Football League
Legend: Blue = home team win; Yellow = draw; Red = away team win.

== Promotion/relegation play-offs ==
Bellinzona as 9th-placed team in the 2010–11 Swiss Super League played a two-legged play-off against Challenge League runners-up Servette.

28 May 2011
16:45 CEST

Bellinzona	1–0	Servette
Pergl 88'	Report (in German)

Stadio Comunale Bellinzona
Attendance: 4,800
Referee: Alain Bieri
31 May 2011
19:15 CEST

Servette	3–1	Bellinzona
de Azevedo 11'; Baumann 45' 56'	Report (in German)	Lustrinelli 69'

Stade de Genève
Attendance: 23,338
Referee: Hänni Nikolaj

Servette won 3–2 on aggregate.

== Top goalscorers ==
Including matches played on 21 May 2011; Source: Swiss Football League

18 goals

- Michaël Rodriguez (SR Delémont)

17 goals

- Bruno Valente (FC Schaffhausen)

16 goals

- Dante Senger (FC Lugano)

15 goals

- Silvio Carlos (FC Lausanne-Sport)
- Eudis (Servette FC)

14 goals

- Jocelyn Roux (FC Lausanne-Sport)

13 goals

- Marcos De Azevedo (Servette FC)

12 goals

- Frédéric Besseyre (FC Stade Nyonnais)
- Franck Etoundi (FC Biel-Bienne)

11 goals

- Dzengis Cavusevic (FC Wil 1900)
- Sabiá (FC Vaduz)
- Moreno Merenda (FC Vaduz)
- Alain Schultz (FC Wohlen)
- Aco Stojkov (FC Aarau)
