= 2017–18 Stoke City F.C. season =

Stoke City
2017–18 season
- Chairman: Peter Coates
- Manager: Mark Hughes (until 6 January 2018); Eddie Niedzwiecki (caretaker) (until 15 January 2018); Paul Lambert (from 16 January 2018)
- Stadium: bet365 Stadium
- Premier League: 19th (relegated)
- FA Cup: Third round
- EFL Cup: Third round
- Top goalscorer: League: Xherdan Shaqiri (8); All: Xherdan Shaqiri (8)
- Highest home attendance: 30,022 v Everton (17 March 2018)
- Lowest home attendance: 27,458 v Watford (31 January 2018)
Home colours	Away colours	Third colours

The 2017–18 Stoke City season was the club's tenth season in the Premier League and the 62nd in the top tier of English football.

There were major changes to the Stoke squad in the summer of 2017 with the departures of Marko Arnautović, Phil Bardsley, Joselu, Jonathan Walters, Philipp Wollscheid and Glenn Whelan whilst Giannelli Imbula, Bojan Krkić and Marc Muniesa left on season-long loans. Coming into the team were Eric Maxim Choupo-Moting, Darren Fletcher, Bruno Martins Indi, Josh Tymon and Kevin Wimmer with Jesé and Kurt Zouma joining on loan.

Stoke initially made a good start to the season with a 1–0 win against Arsenal and a 2–2 draw with Manchester United. However their defensive problems returned as heavy defeats against Chelsea (4–0), Manchester City (7–2), Liverpool (3–0), Tottenham Hotspur (5–1) and West Ham United (3–0) saw supporters turn against Mark Hughes. After an embarrassing FA Cup exit at League Two Coventry City in January, Hughes had his contract terminated by the club, and he was replaced by the former Aston Villa and Norwich City manager Paul Lambert. Lambert managed to improve the leaky defence but it left Stoke anemic as an attacking side meaning they were unable to see out victories and escape the relegation zone, Stoke finishing in 19th position three points from safety, ending their ten-year spell in the Premier League.

== Pre-season ==
On 16 May 2017 Stoke announced that mobile game, Top Eleven, will be the club's sleeve sponsor. Stoke announced pre-season friendly's against Swiss sides Neuchâtel Xamax and BSC Young Boys in the Uhrencup, Championship sides Bolton Wanderers and Sheffield United, League Two Crewe Alexandra, Bundesliga side RB Leipzig and Ligue 1 side AS Monaco.

Stoke announced their retained list on 26 May 2017, departing the club were goalkeepers Shay Given and Daniel Bachmann whilst U23 players, Liam Edwards, Harry Isted, Joel Taylor and George Waring also left the club. Stoke's first signing of the 2017–18 season was Scottish veteran Darren Fletcher on a free from West Bromwich Albion. The Stoke squad returned to training on 5 July 2017 and on the same day Stoke completed the signing of young left-back Josh Tymon from Hull City. On 7 July 2017 Jonathan Walters joined Burnley for £3 million after spending seven years with the Potters. The squad then departed for their Swiss training camp near Biel/Bienne on 9 July 2017. Prior to the first match of pre-season Belgian U23 duo Julien Ngoy and Thibaud Verlinden were promoted to the first team.

However they also suffered a blow with the news that Marko Arnautović had submitted a transfer request. Stoke began their pre-season with a 1–0 win against Swiss Challenge League side Neuchâtel Xamax with Igor Djuric scoring a late own goal. BSC Young Boys were Stoke's final opponents in the Uhrencup on 12 July 2017. The Swiss side scored twice either side of half-time through Guillaume Hoarau and Yoric Ravet. Stoke hit back with goals from Charlie Adam and Marc Muniesa and the match ended in a 2–2 draw. The winner was determined by a penalty shoot-out with Stoke winning 4–3 after 16 spot kicks. Stoke's last match in Switzerland was a 4–2 defeat against AS Monaco. On 20 July 2017 long serving Glenn Whelan joined Aston Villa after nine years with the Potters. Defender Kurt Zouma arrived on a season-long loan from Chelsea.

Stoke sold Arnautović to West Ham United for a club record fee of £20 million before they beat Amiens SC 1–0 at the Stade de la Licorne, Diouf scoring the only goal. On 25 July 2017 Phil Bardsley joined Burnley and Stoke lost 2–1 at Championship side Sheffield United. City then beat Bolton Wanderers 2–1 on 29 July with Joselu scoring twice. Stoke played German side FC St. Pauli on 1 August 2017 to mark the start of a strategic partnership between the two clubs. St. Pauli won 4–2 with Joselu scoring a second consecutive brace. Stoke ended a busy pre-season programme with a match against RB Leipzig at the Red Bull Arena. Despite falling behind early on to an Emil Forsberg penalty, City won the match 2–1 with a header from Diouf and an own goal from Marvin Compper.

Match	Date	Opponent	Venue	Result	Scorers	Report
1	10 July 2017	Neuchâtel Xamax	A	1–0	Djuric 87' (o.g.)	Report
2	12 July 2017	BSC Young Boys	A	2–2 (4–3 pens)	Adam 52', (pen), Muniesa 57'	Report
3	15 July 2017	AS Monaco	A	2–4	Berahino 10', Diouf 47'	Report
4	22 July 2017	Amiens SC	A	1–0	Diouf 45'	Report
5	25 July 2017	Sheffield United	A	1–2	Shaqiri 35'	Report
6	29 July 2017	Bolton Wanderers	A	2–1	Joselu (2) 77', 88'	Report
7	1 August 2017	FC St. Pauli	A	2–4	Joselu (2) 41', 67'	Report
8	5 August 2017	RB Leipzig	A	2–1	Diouf 44', Compper 78' (o.g.)	Report

== Premier League ==
The 2017–18 season fixtures were announced on 14 June with Stoke beginning the campaign away at Everton.

=== August ===
For the season opener at Goodison Park, Mark Hughes decided to play a 5–2–3 formation, giving debuts to new arrivals Darren Fletcher and Kurt Zouma. In what was evenly contested match, the Toffees were able to claim a 1–0 win thanks to a Wayne Rooney header in first half stoppage time. Stoke's best chance came in the final minute of the match when Jordan Pickford produced a fine save to deny a long range strike from Xherdan Shaqiri.

Stoke's first home match of the season was against old adversaries Arsenal. The capacity of the bet365 Stadium was now at just over 30,000 following the filling in of the south-east corner. A new record crowd of 29,459 witnessed the Potters win 1–0 with new loan signing Jesé scoring just after half time. Arsenal had 77% ball possession but were unable to force an equalizer although Alexandre Lacazette did have a goal ruled out for a tight offside.

Stoke ended August with the short trip to the Hawthorns to take on Tony Pulis' West Bromwich Albion. In a match of few chances the Baggies took the lead through Jay Rodriguez in the 61st minute. A defensive mix up between Ben Foster and Ahmed Hegazi allowed Peter Crouch to head into an empty net to earn Stoke a 1–1 draw.

=== September ===
Hughes gave a debut to his new £18 million defender, Kevin Wimmer for the visit of Manchester United who arrived in the Potteries having won all their first three matches without conceding. Stoke put in a strong performance and took the lead on 43 minutes through Eric Maxim Choupo-Moting. That lead was short lived however as a header from Paul Pogba was deflected in by Marcus Rashford. The Red Devils then went in front through Romelu Lukaku on 57 minutes. Jesé forced David de Gea into a fine save and from the resulting corner Choupo-Moting scored his second goal and the match ended in a 2–2 draw.

Stoke then made the long trip to St James' Park to play against newly promoted Newcastle United. Stoke put in a disappointing performance and lost 2–1 with Christian Atsu and Jamaal Lascelles finding the net either side of a Xherdan Shaqiri strike. The result could have been worse had former striker, Joselu not squandered several good chances.

After a disappointing exit in the League Cup, Stoke faced the champions, Chelsea without defenders, Cameron, Shawcross, Wimmer and Zouma. Chelsea took full advantage of Stoke's defensive injuries and won 4–0 with Álvaro Morata hitting a hat-trick.

The Potters ended September with a home match against Mauricio Pellegrino's Southampton. Stoke took the lead on 40 minutes with Mame Biram Diouf heading in a Shaqiri corner, and they had the chance to double their lead after Saido Berahino was brought down in the penalty area by Virgil van Dijk. Berahino, still without a Stoke goal, took the penalty but it was poor and easily saved by Fraser Forster. The Saints drew level on 75 minutes through an acrobatic strike from Japanese defender Maya Yoshida, but Stoke claimed victory with Crouch tapping in from close range.

=== October ===
Following the international break Stoke faced a daunting trip to title favorites Manchester City and Mark Hughes decided to give a debut to academy graduate Tom Edwards. Stoke made a terrible start to the match and were three down after half an hour with goals from Gabriel Jesus, Raheem Sterling and David Silva. Stoke briefly made a comeback with a goal from Diouf and an own goal from Kyle Walker but Stoke had no answer to Man City's fast attacking play and goals from Jesus, Fernandinho, Leroy Sané and Bernardo Silva condemned Stoke to their second heaviest Premier League defeat.

Stoke then lost again the following week at home to Eddie Howe's Bournemouth which increased supporter unrest towards Mark Hughes. The Cherries scored two quick fire goals in the first half through Andrew Surman and a penalty from Junior Stanislas, Diouf scored his third goal in as many matches but it ended 2–1. Despite the defeat the Stoke board insisted that they still back Hughes.

After conceding 20 goals the first nine matches Hughes decided to employ a defensive approach away at in-form Watford. The change in approach paid off as Stoke ground out a 1–0 win thanks to a volley from Darren Fletcher. There were a number of confrontations during the match with Hornets captain Troy Deeney later being charged with violent conduct. The FA also charged both Watford and Stoke for failing to control their players.

=== November ===
City's first match of November was against Claude Puel's Leicester City at home. The Foxes were the brighter side in the first half and took the lead through Vicente Iborra. Shaqiri equalized for Stoke before half time but Riyad Mahrez put Leicester back in front after 60 minutes. Peter Crouch came off the bench and headed past Kasper Schmeichel to earn Stoke a 2–2 draw.

Stoke then made the long trip south for their first match at the Falmer Stadium, to play against Brighton & Hove Albion in what was the first top flight meeting between the clubs since 1983. Choupo-Moting scored after 28 minutes after being put through by Shaqiri. Pascal Groß leveled for Brighton just before half time but Stoke responded instantly with a header from Kurt Zouma. However Stoke again failed to hold on to their lead and José Izquierdo earned Chris Hughton's side a point.

Stoke played bottom of the table Crystal Palace on 25 November and were beaten 2–1. Shaqiri had given Stoke the lead with a fine individual goal but Palace scored through Ruben Loftus-Cheek and Mamadou Sakho.

The Potters ended a poor November with a 3–0 home defeat against Liverpool with goals from Sadio Mané and two from Mohamed Salah.

=== December ===
Stoke began the Christmas period with a narrow victory over relegation rivals Swansea City. Wilfried Bony gave the Swans an early lead before two quick goal from Shaqiri and Diouf set Stoke up for a 2–1 win. After the match it was revealed that Jese left the bench before the end of the match and was subsequently fined by Hughes.

City then had a rare trip to Wembley, the temporary home of Tottenham Hotspur. Stoke put in an embarrassing performance, losing 5–1. This prompted a furious reaction from the Stoke supporters who chanted against the manager. This continued back at Stoke train station where angry supporters confronted Hughes and the players.

Stoke fell to another defeat this time going down 1–0 away at in-form Burnley at Turf Moor, Ashley Barnes scoring the only goal in the 88th minute.

The next home match against David Moyes' West Ham United was delayed by an hour after a power cut effected the bet365 Stadium and surrounding area. West Ham took the lead in controversial circumstances as Mark Noble scored from the spot after Manuel Lanzini went down in the area under minimal contact from Pieters and was later charged with diving by the FA. Stoke failed to get back into the match and further goals from Diafra Sakho and ex-Stoke player Marko Arnautovic lead to more fan unrest towards Hughes.

Prior to the match against Midland's rivals West Bromwich Albion, Hughes had to reject claims that his job at Stoke was under threat. Joe Allen and Choupo-Moting put Stoke into a 2–0 half time lead against the Baggies but a mistake by Shawcross let in Salomón Rondón to score. West Brom put Stoke under considerable pressure but a counterattack in the final moments allowed Ramadan Sobhi to score his first Premier League goal to make it 3–1.

On Boxing day the Potters travelled to Huddersfield Town in what was the first top flight meeting between the clubs since 1972. City made a terrible start as Tom Ince gave the home side an early lead and then Shawcross had to leave due to injury. Ramadan scored his second goal in two matches and the game ended in a 1–1 draw.

Stoke's final match of a poor 2017 saw them travel to champions Chelsea. Hughes decided to play a weakened team in order to rest players for the match against relegation rivals Newcastle United on New Years Day and Chelsea went on to win 5–0.

=== January ===
Hughes's decision to rest players against Chelsea backfired as Newcastle United won 1–0, Ayoze Perez scoring the only goal of a poor quality match.

After losing 2–1 to League Two side Coventry City in the FA Cup, on 6 January, Hughes was sacked by the club bringing an end to his four-and-a-half-year spell as manager. Former Aston Villa, Blackburn Rovers, Norwich City and Wolverhampton Wanderers manager Paul Lambert was chosen by the board as Hughes' successor. The board had previously approached Quique Sánchez Flores and Martin O'Neill but were unsuccessful.

Eddie Niedzwiecki took charge of Stoke's trip to Manchester United with Lambert watching on high in the stands at Old Trafford. Despite Stoke putting in an improved performance Man United proved far too strong and won 3–0 with goals from Romelu Lukaku, Anthony Martial and Antonio Valencia.

Paul Lambert's first match in charge of the Potters was against fellow relegation rivals Huddersfield Town. Under Lambert Stoke showed more energy and urgency but were unable to trouble Terriers 'keeper Jonas Lössl in the opening 45. In the second half goals from Allen and Diouf earned Stoke a vital 2–0 victory to move them out of the relegation places.

On 31 January Stoke brought in Senegalese midfielder Badou Ndiaye from Turkish club Galatasaray for a fee of £14 million. Stoke then played out a drab goalless draw against Watford.

=== February ===
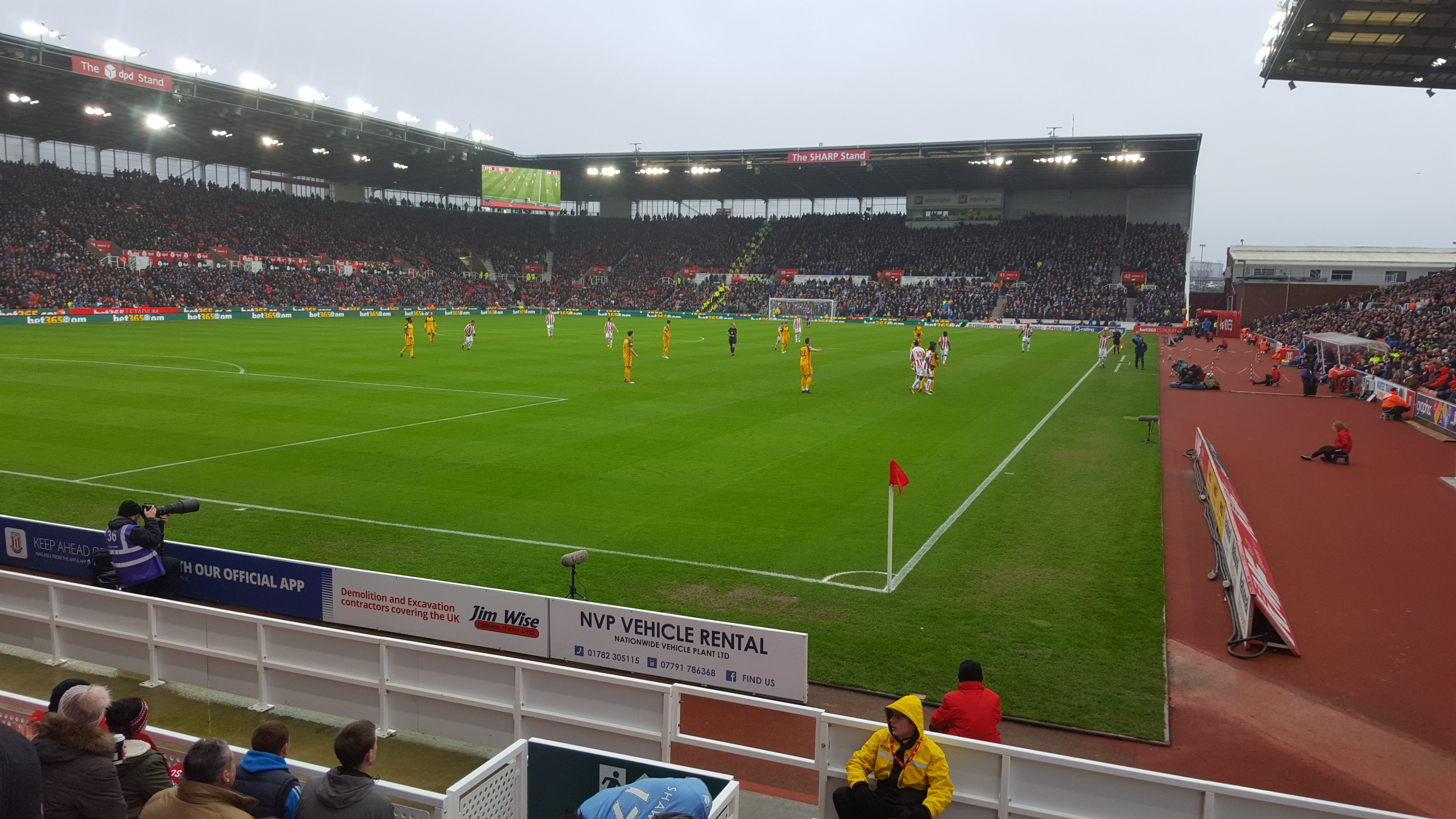
Stoke v Brighton (10 February 2018)

The Potters made the long trip to Bournemouth and took an early lead through a Shaqiri header. Stoke dominated the first half however the Cherries turned the match around in the second half and inflicted a damaging defeat on Stoke.

Stoke then missed a golden opportunity to claim three points against Brighton. Shaqiri had cancelled out Izquierdo opener before in the dying stages Stoke were awarded a penalty after Jese was fouled by Dale Stephens. Charlie Adam took the kick but saw his effort saved by Mathew Ryan and Adam was then unable to score the rebound.

City were then left to rue another missed opportunity in their next match at Leicester City. Stoke took the lead just before half time through another Shaqiri strike and were doing well to hold off a pacey Leicester side. However an uncharacteristic error from Jack Butland handed Leicester a draw.

=== March ===
Stoke then traveled to relegation rivals Southampton on 3 March. The match was of very poor quality and both sides ended up cancelling each other out in a drab 0–0 draw leaving Stoke remaining in the relegation zone.

Run-away leaders Manchester City were Stoke's next opponents and easily won 2–0 with a brace from David Silva, Stoke doing well to keep the scoreline respectable.

Stoke then suffered another home defeat this time against Everton. The match was played in snowy conditions and the match took a turn for the worse when Charlie Adam was sent off for a tackle on Wayne Rooney. Everton took full advantage of the extra man and scored twice through Cenk Tosun either side of a Choupo-Moting strike. Despite the defeat Lambert remained confident of survival.

=== April ===
Stoke's first match of April was at Arsenal. After putting in a spirited display the match turned in the 75th minute when Arsenal were awarded a soft penalty, Pierre-Emerick Aubameyang scoring. From there on the players lost belief and further goals from Aubameyang and another penalty this time from Alexandre Lacazette condemned Stoke to another defeat.

City's slide into the Championship continued after a narrow defeat to Tottenham Hotspur, Christian Eriksen scoring twice either side of a goal from Mame Diouf.

Stoke then let slip yet another opportunity to gain a victory this time at West Ham United. After a goalless first half Stoke took the lead through Crouch with ten minutes remaining following an error by Joe Hart, but Andy Carroll equalized for the Hammers in the 90th minute.

Stoke again failed to see out a victory in their next match against Burnley. Badou Ndiaye had given the Potters an early lead before poor defending allowed Ashley Barnes to score and the match ended in a 1–1 draw, leaving relegation inevitable.

They then played out a goalless draw away at Liverpool on 28 April, leaving Stoke 3 points from safety with two games remaining although all their relegation rivals had games in hand and a much superior goal difference.

=== May ===
Stoke then faced Crystal Palace on 5 May, knowing only a win would be enough to take the fight for survival to the last day of the season. However, despite Shaqiri giving Stoke the lead in the first half, second half goals from James McArthur and Patrick van Aanholt condemned the Potters to Championship football.

Stoke ended a disastrous season with a 2–1 win at Swansea City with goals from Badou and Crouch. The result relegated Swansea and also ensured that the Potters did not finish bottom of the table.

=== Results ===
Match	Date	Opponent	Venue	Result	Attendance	Scorers	Report
1	12 August 2017	Everton	A	0–1	39,045		Report
2	19 August 2017	Arsenal	H	1–0	29,459	Jesé 47'	Report
3	27 August 2017	West Bromwich Albion	A	1–1	22,704	Crouch 77'	Report
4	9 September 2017	Manchester United	H	2–2	29,320	Choupo-Moting (2) 43', 63'	Report
5	16 September 2017	Newcastle United	A	1–2	51,795	Shaqiri 57'	Report
6	23 September 2017	Chelsea	H	0–4	29,661		Report
7	30 September 2017	Southampton	H	2–1	29,285	Diouf 40', Crouch 85'	Report
8	14 October 2017	Manchester City	A	2–7	54,128	Diouf 44', Walker 47' (o.g.)	Report
9	21 October 2017	Bournemouth	H	1–2	29,500	Diouf 63'	Report
10	28 October 2017	Watford	A	1–0	20,087	Fletcher 16'	Report
11	4 November 2017	Leicester City	H	2–2	29,602	Shaqiri 39', Crouch 73'	Report
12	20 November 2017	Brighton & Hove Albion	A	2–2	29,676	Choupo-Moting 28', Zouma 45+1'	Report
13	25 November 2017	Crystal Palace	A	1–2	23,723	Shaqiri 53'	Report
14	29 November 2017	Liverpool	H	0–3	29,423		Report
15	2 December 2017	Swansea City	H	2–1	28,261	Shaqiri 36', Diouf 40'	Report
16	9 December 2017	Tottenham Hotspur	A	1–5	62,202	Shawcross 80'	Report
17	12 December 2017	Burnley	A	0–1	19,909		Report
18	16 December 2017	West Ham United	H	0–3	29,265		Report
19	23 December 2017	West Bromwich Albion	H	3–1	29,057	Allen 19', Choupo-Moting 45'+2, Ramadan 90'+5	Report
20	26 December 2017	Huddersfield Town	A	1–1	24,047	Ramadan 60'	Report
21	30 December 2017	Chelsea	A	0–5	41,433		Report
22	1 January 2018	Newcastle United	H	0–1	28,471		Report
23	15 January 2018	Manchester United	A	0–3	74,726		Report
24	20 January 2018	Huddersfield Town	H	2–0	29,785	Allen 53', Diouf 69'	Report
25	31 January 2018	Watford	H	0–0	27,458		Report
26	3 February 2018	Bournemouth	A	1–2	10,614	Shaqiri 5'	Report
27	10 February 2018	Brighton & Hove Albion	H	1–1	29,876	Shaqiri 68'	Report
28	24 February 2018	Leicester City	A	1–1	31,769	Shaqiri 43'	Report
29	3 March 2018	Southampton	A	0–0	30,335		Report
30	12 March 2018	Manchester City	H	0–2	29,138		Report
31	17 March 2018	Everton	H	1–2	30,022	Choupo-Moting 77'	Report
32	1 April 2018	Arsenal	A	0–3	59,371		Report
33	7 April 2018	Tottenham Hotspur	H	1–2	29,515	Diouf 57'	Report
34	16 April 2018	West Ham United	A	1–1	56,795	Crouch 79'	Report
35	22 April 2018	Burnley	H	1–1	29,532	Badou 11'	Report
36	27 April 2018	Liverpool	A	0–0	53,255		Report
37	5 May 2018	Crystal Palace	H	1–2	29,687	Shaqiri 43'	Report
38	13 May 2018	Swansea City	A	2–1	20,673	Badou 31', Crouch 41'	Report

=== League table ===
Pos	Team	Pld	W	D	L	GF	GA	GD	Pts	Qualification or relegation
16	Huddersfield Town	38	9	10	19	28	58	−30	37	
17	Southampton	38	7	15	16	37	56	−19	36	
18	Swansea City (R)	38	8	9	21	28	56	−28	33	Relegation to EFL Championship
19	Stoke City (R)	38	7	12	19	35	68	−33	33	Relegation to EFL Championship
20	West Bromwich Albion (R)	38	6	13	19	31	56	−25	31	Relegation to EFL Championship

Source: Premier League
Rules for classification: 1) Points; 2) Goal difference; 3) Goals scored. 4) Play-offs (only if needed to decide champion, teams for relegation or teams for UEFA competitions).
(R) Relegated

== FA Cup ==
Stoke were drawn away at EFL League Two side Coventry City in the third round. Stoke went into the tie with Mark Hughes under considerable pressure after an awful run of results. There was no end to that run as goals from Jordan Willis and Jack Grimmer gave Coventry a 2–1 victory, leaving Hughes' position untenable.

Round	Date	Opponent	Venue	Result	Attendance	Scorers	Report
R3	6 January 2018	Coventry City	A	1–2	14,199	Adam 54' (pen)	Report

== EFL Cup ==
Stoke were drawn against League One side Rochdale in the second round of the EFL Cup. Stoke ran out comfortable 4–0 winners with goals from Peter Crouch, Ramadan Sobhi and a brace from Joe Allen. Manager Mark Hughes gave debuts to three young players in the match Harry Souttar, Josh Tymon and Thibaud Verlinden. Stoke played Championship side Bristol City in the third round where the team put in a woeful performance and the Robins easily won 2–0, with goals from Famara Diedhiou and Matty Taylor.

Round	Date	Opponent	Venue	Result	Attendance	Scorers	Report
R2	23 August 2017	Rochdale	H	4–0	9,930	Allen (2) 16', 42', Crouch 29', Ramadan 80'	Report
R3	19 September 2017	Bristol City	A	0–2	13,826		Report

== Squad statistics ==
No.	Pos.	Name	Premier League		FA Cup		League Cup		Total		Discipline	
No.	Pos.	Name	Apps	Goals	Apps	Goals	Apps	Goals	Apps	Goals	Yellow card	Red card
1	GK	(England) Jack Butland	35	0	1	0	0	0	36	0	0	0
2	DF	(Austria) Moritz Bauer	15	0	0	0	0	0	15	0	4	0
3	DF	(Netherlands) Erik Pieters	30(1)	0	0	0	1	0	31(1)	0	4	0
4	MF	(Wales) Joe Allen	36	2	1	0	1	2	38	4	8	0
5	DF	(Austria) Kevin Wimmer	14(3)	0	1	0	1	0	16(3)	0	5	0
6	DF	(France) Kurt Zouma	32(2)	1	1	0	2	0	35(2)	1	1	0
7	MF	(Republic of Ireland) Stephen Ireland	1(3)	0	1	0	0	0	2(3)	0	2	0
8	DF	(England) Glen Johnson	7(2)	0	0	0	1	0	8(2)	0	2	0
9	FW	(England) Saido Berahino	3(12)	0	1	0	0(1)	0	4(13)	0	0	0
10	FW	(Cameroon) Eric Maxim Choupo-Moting	26(4)	5	0(1)	0	1	0	27(5)	5	3	0
11	FW	(Spain) Jesé	8(5)	1	0	0	0	0	8(5)	1	0	0
12	DF	(England) Josh Tymon	2(1)	0	0	0	2	0	4(1)	0	0	0
14	MF	(Netherlands) Ibrahim Afellay	1(5)	0	0	0	0	0	1(5)	0	1	0
15	DF	(Netherlands) Bruno Martins Indi	14(3)	0	0	0	2	0	16(3)	0	4	0
16	MF	(Scotland) Charlie Adam	5(6)	0	1	1	2	0	8(6)	1	3	1
17	DF	(England) Ryan Shawcross (c)	27	1	0	0	0	0	27	1	2	0
18	FW	(Senegal) Mame Biram Diouf	30(5)	6	1	0	0(1)	0	31(6)	6	6	0
20	MF	(United States) Geoff Cameron	17(3)	0	1	0	0	0	18(3)	0	3	0
21	DF	(Greece) Kostas Stafylidis	4(1)	0	0	0	0	0	4(1)	0	0	0
22	MF	(Switzerland) Xherdan Shaqiri	36	8	0(1)	0	0(1)	0	36(2)	8	4	0
24	MF	(Scotland) Darren Fletcher	25(2)	1	0	0	1(1)	0	26(3)	1	1	0
25	FW	(England) Peter Crouch	14(17)	5	0(1)	0	2	1	16(18)	6	4	0
26	DF	(Germany) Philipp Wollscheid	0	0	0	0	1	0	1	0	0	0
27	MF	(Senegal) Badou Ndiaye	13	2	0	0	0	0	13	2	5	0
27	FW	(Spain) Bojan	1	0	0	0	1	0	2	0	0	0
28	FW	(Belgium) Julien Ngoy	0(1)	0	0	0	0	0	0(1)	0	0	0
29	GK	(Denmark) Jakob Haugaard	0	0	0	0	0	0	0	0	0	0
31	FW	(Belgium) Thibaud Verlinden	0	0	0	0	0(1)	0	0(1)	0	0	0
32	MF	(Egypt) Ramadan Sobhi	12(12)	2	1	0	2	1	15(12)	3	2	0
33	GK	(England) Lee Grant	3	0	0	0	2	0	5	0	0	0
36	DF	(Scotland) Harry Souttar	0	0	0	0	0(1)	0	0(1)	0	0	0
40	FW	(England) Tyrese Campbell	0(4)	0	0	0	0	0	0(4)	0	0	0
42	DF	(England) Tom Edwards	6	0	1	0	0	0	7	0	0	0
55	MF	(Denmark) Lasse Sørensen	1	0	0	0	0	0	1	0	0	0
–	–	Own goals	–	1	–	0	–	0	–	1	–	–

== Transfers ==
=== In ===
Date	Pos.	Name	From	Fee	Ref.
1 July 2017	MF	(Scotland) Darren Fletcher	(England) West Bromwich Albion	Free	
1 July 2017	GK	(England) Josef Bursik	(England) AFC Wimbledon	Undisclosed	
5 July 2017	DF	(England) Josh Tymon	(England) Hull City	Compensation	
12 July 2017	MF	(England) Tre Pemberton	(England) Blackburn Rovers	Undisclosed	
7 August 2017	FW	(Cameroon) Eric Maxim Choupo-Moting	(Germany) FC Schalke 04	Free	
11 August 2017	DF	(Netherlands) Bruno Martins Indi	(Portugal) FC Porto	£7 million	
29 August 2017	DF	(Austria) Kevin Wimmer	(England) Tottenham Hotspur	£18 million	
9 January 2018	DF	(Austria) Moritz Bauer	(Russia) Rubin Kazan	Undisclosed	
31 January 2018	MF	(Senegal) Badou Ndiaye	(Turkey) Galatasaray	£14 million	

=== Out ===
Date	Pos.	Name	To	Fee	Ref.
1 July 2017	GK	(Austria) Daniel Bachmann	(England) Watford	Free	
1 July 2017	DF	(England) Liam Edwards	Released	Free	
1 July 2017	GK	(Republic of Ireland) Shay Given	Released	Free	
1 July 2017	GK	(England) Harry Isted	(England) Luton Town	Free	
1 July 2017	DF	(England) Joel Taylor	Released	Free	
1 July 2017	FW	(England) George Waring	(England) Tranmere Rovers	Free	
7 July 2017	FW	(Republic of Ireland) Jonathan Walters	(England) Burnley	£3million	
20 July 2017	MF	(Republic of Ireland) Glenn Whelan	(England) Aston Villa	£1.25million	
22 July 2017	MF	(Austria) Marko Arnautović	(England) West Ham United	£20million	
25 July 2017	DF	(Scotland) Phil Bardsley	(England) Burnley	Undisclosed	
16 August 2017	FW	(Spain) Joselu	(England) Newcastle United	£5million	
30 August 2017	DF	(Germany) Philipp Wollscheid	(France) Metz	Free	

=== Loans in ===
Date from	Pos.	Name	From	Date to	Ref.
21 July 2017	DF	(France) Kurt Zouma	(England) Chelsea	30 June 2018	
16 August 2017	FW	(Spain) Jesé	(France) Paris Saint-Germain	30 June 2018	
18 January 2018	DF	(Greece) Kostas Stafylidis	(Germany) FC Augsburg	30 June 2018	

=== Loans out ===
Date from	Pos.	Name	To	Date to	Ref.
4 August 2017	DF	(Republic of Ireland) Ryan Sweeney	(England) Bristol Rovers	30 June 2018	
4 August 2017	FW	(England) Dom Telford	(England) Bristol Rovers	30 June 2018	
11 August 2017	DF	(Spain) Marc Muniesa	(Spain) Girona	30 June 2018	
21 August 2017	MF	(Morocco) Moha El Ouriachi	(Spain) Espanyol B	30 June 2018	
31 August 2017	MF	(France) Giannelli Imbula	(France) Toulouse	30 June 2018	
31 August 2017	MF	(Spain) Bojan Krkić	(Spain) Deportivo Alavés	30 June 2018	
