= Luiyi Lugo =

Dominican international footballer (born 1994)

Personal information
- Date of birth: 21 February 1994 (age 32)
- Place of birth: Santiago, Dominican Republic
- Height: 1.86 m (6 ft 1 in)
- Positions: Forward; winger

Team information
- Current team: SC Cham
- Number: 9

Youth career
- –2013: FC Aarau

Senior career*
Years	Team	Apps	(Gls)
2013–2015	FC Baden	44	(14)
2015–2016	FC Wohlen	6	(0)
2016	→ YF Juventus (loan)	11	(1)
2016–2017	FC Baden	10	(2)
2018–2020	FC Wettswil-Bonstetten	41	(31)
2020–2022	FC Wohlen	29	(21)
2022–	SC Cham	42	(23)

International career
2015–	Dominican Republic	1	(0)
- * Club domestic league appearances and goals as of 10 November 2024

Luiyi Lugo (born 21 February 1994) is a Dominican international footballer who plays for SC Cham in Switzerland, as a forward or winger. He also holds Swiss citizenship.

== Career ==
Lugo has played for the youth system of FC Aarau.

He made his international debut for Dominican Republic on 25 March 2015. He was a starter in a 0–3 friendly lost against Cuba, being substituted at the 73rd minute.
