= 2011–12 Swiss Challenge League =

Swiss Challenge League
- Season: 2011–12
- Champions: St. Gallen
- Promoted: St. Gallen
- Relegated: Stade Nyonnais; Étoile Carouge; Delémont; Kriens; Brühl
- Matches: 240
- Goals: 713 (2.97 per match)
- Top goalscorer: Armando Sadiku (19)
- Biggest home win: Aarau 7–0 Biel-Bienne
- Biggest away win: Brühl 0–6 Locarno
- Highest scoring: Kriens 7–1 Brühl / Biel-Bienne 3–5 Vaduz

The 2011–12 Swiss Challenge League was the ninth season of the Swiss Challenge League, the second tier of the Swiss football league pyramid. It began on 22 July 2011 and ended on 23 May 2012. The champions of this season, St. Gallen, earned promotion to the 2012–13 Super League. The runners-up Aarau lost the promotion/relegation playoff against the 9th-placed team of the 2011–12 Super League, FC Sion. The bottom five teams, Stade Nyonnais, Étoile Carouge, Delémont, Kriens and Brühl were all relegated to partly form the newly created 1. Liga Promotion.

== Teams ==
2010–11 Challenge League champions FC Lausanne-Sport were promoted to the 2011–12 Super League. They were replaced by St. Gallen, who were relegated after finishing the 2010–11 Super League in last place. 2010–11 Challenge League runners-up Servette had to compete in a promotion/relegation playoff against 9th-placed Super League team AC Bellinzona and were promoted (hence exchanging leagues) after winning 3–2 on aggregate.

FC Schaffhausen as 15th-placed team and last-placed Yverdon-Sport FC were relegated after the 2010–11 season. They were replaced by SC Brühl and Étoile Carouge FC, who were promoted from 1. Liga.

Locations of clubs in the 2011–12 Challenge League

Club	City	Stadium	2010–11 season
FC Aarau	Aarau	Stadion Brügglifeld	11th in Challenge League
AC Bellinzona	Bellinzona, Ticino	Stadio Comunale	9th in Super League
FC Biel/Bienne	Biel/Bienne, Bern	Gurzelen Stadion	9th in Challenge League
SC Brühl St. Gallen	St. Gallen, St. Gallen	Paul-Grüninger-Stadion	2010–11 1. Liga play-off winners
FC Chiasso	Chiasso, Ticino	Stadio Comunale	7th in Challenge League
SR Delémont	Delémont, Jura	La Blancherie	8th in Challenge League
Étoile Carouge FC	Carouge, Geneva	Stade de la Fontenette	2010–11 1. Liga play-off winners
SC Kriens	Kriens, Lucerne	Stadion Kleinfeld	12th in Challenge League
FC Locarno	Locarno, Ticino	Stadio del Lido	14th in Challenge League
FC Lugano	Lugano, Ticino	Cornaredo Stadium	3rd in Challenge League
FC St. Gallen	St. Gallen, St. Gallen	AFG Arena	10th in Super League
FC Stade Nyonnais	Nyon, Vaud	Centre sportif de Colovray Nyon	6th in Challenge League
FC Vaduz	Vaduz, Liechtenstein	Rheinpark Stadion	4th in Challenge League
FC Wil 1900	Wil, St. Gallen	Stadion Bergholz	5th in Challenge League
FC Winterthur	Winterthur, Zürich	Stadion Schützenwiese	13th in Challenge League
FC Wohlen	Wohlen, Aargau	Stadion Niedermatten	10th in Challenge League

== League table ==
Pos	Team	Pld	W	D	L	GF	GA	GD	Pts	Promotion or relegation
1	St. Gallen (C, P)	30	19	7	4	67	31	+36	64	Promoted to 2012–13 Swiss Super League
2	Aarau	30	18	5	7	64	34	+30	59	Qualification for Promotion play-off
3	Bellinzona	30	18	5	7	49	21	+28	59	
4	Winterthur	30	15	8	7	44	29	+15	53	
5	Lugano	30	14	7	9	44	38	+6	49	
6	Wil	30	12	10	8	59	41	+18	46	
7	Chiasso	30	11	12	7	34	23	+11	45	
8	Vaduz	30	13	6	11	54	45	+9	45	
9	Locarno	30	12	9	9	47	44	+3	45	
10	Biel-Bienne	30	12	7	11	55	54	+1	43	
11	Wohlen	30	9	9	12	39	44	−5	36	
12	Stade Nyonnais (R)	30	8	10	12	41	49	−8	34	Relegation to 2012–13 1. Liga Promotion
13	Étoile Carouge (R)	30	8	6	16	25	56	−31	30	Relegation to 2012–13 1. Liga Promotion
14	Delémont (R)	30	4	8	18	24	60	−36	20	Relegation to 2012–13 1. Liga Promotion
15	Kriens (R)	30	4	5	21	37	66	−29	17	Relegation to 2012–13 1. Liga Promotion
16	Brühl (R)	30	4	4	22	30	78	−48	16	Relegation to 2012–13 1. Liga Promotion

Rules for classification: 1) points; 2) goal difference; 3) number of goals scored.
(C) Champions; (P) Promoted; (R) Relegated

== Results ==
Teams played each other twice over the course of the season, home and away, for a total of 30 matches per team.

Home \ Away	AAR	BEL	BB	BRU	CHI	DEL	EC	KRI	LOC	LUG	STG	SN	VAD	WIL	WIN	WOH
Aarau		2–3	1–3	1–0	1–4	5–0	7–0	3–1	4–1	1–0	2–2	2–1	2–1	1–2	2–1	2–0
Bellinzona	0–1		5–2	3–1	0–0	1–2	2–0	1–0	2–0	3–1	0–1	2–0	2–1	0–1	2–0	5–0
Biel-Bienne	0–3	0–0		3–0	2–1	4–1	0–0	4–1	1–1	1–2	3–2	0–2	3–5	0–4	1–2	0–0
Brühl	0–3	1–4	1–4		0–2	1–1	1–2	2–0	0–6	3–4	1–3	3–1	2–3	1–1	0–5	3–2
Chiasso	0–0	1–0	2–4	3–0		4–0	0–1	2–1	0–1	1–1	1–1	1–0	3–0	2–1	1–2	1–0
Delémont	2–2	1–3	1–2	3–0	0–0		0–1	1–1	2–1	0–1	0–2	2–2	1–1	4–0	0–1	0–1
Étoile Carouge	0–2	1–3	3–2	0–2	2–1	2–0		2–1	1–5	3–0	1–5	0–1	0–4	1–1	0–2	1–3
Kriens	0–2	0–1	2–4	7–1	1–1	2–0	1–1		2–3	2–2	0–2	3–4	0–3	1–4	0–2	4–1
Locarno	1–1	0–3	2–0	2–1	1–1	3–0	3–0	1–3		1–1	0–2	2–2	2–1	2–1	1–1	2–0
Lugano	3–1	2–0	1–3	3–1	1–1	3–1	2–0	2–0	1–1		3–1	2–1	2–0	0–3	1–2	0–2
St. Gallen	1–2	1–1	4–1	3–1	0–1	6–0	2–1	3–2	5–0	1–0		2–2	4–2	3–2	1–1	0–0
Stade Nyonnais	2–2	1–2	0–0	2–2	0–0	1–0	1–1	3–0	1–1	3–2	0–3		1–0	2–2	0–2	0–1
Vaduz	3–2	0–0	3–3	1–0	1–0	3–0	3–1	3–0	2–0	1–1	1–2	3–4		3–2	2–2	1–1
Wil	3–2	1–1	1–2	3–0	1–1	6–1	2–0	1–1	1–2	1–1	2–2	3–1	1–2		1–1	2–1
Winterthur	1–2	1–0	2–1	2–1	0–0	0–0	0–0	4–1	0–0	1–2	0–1	2–1	2–0	1–4		1–2
Wohlen	1–3	0–1	2–2	1–1	1–1	1–1	0–0	3–0	5–2	0–1	1–2	4–2	2–1	2–2	2–3	

Source: Soccerway
Legend: Blue = home team win; Yellow = draw; Red = away team win.

== Relegation play-offs ==
The ninth-placed team in the 2011–12 Swiss Super League, Sion, played a two-legged play-off against the Challenge League runners-up, Aarau, for a spot in the 2012–13 Super League.

26 May 2012
15:00 CEST

Sion	2–0	Aarau
Winter 58', 81'	Report

Stade Tourbillon, Sion
Attendance: 10,800
Referee: Stephan Studer
28 May 2012
17:00 CEST

Aarau	1–0	Sion
Gashi 55'	Report

Stadion Brügglifeld, Aarau
Attendance: 8,800
Referee: Patrick Graf

Sion won 2–1 on aggregate.

== Top scorers ==
Rank	Player	Club	Goals
1	(Albania) Armando Sadiku	Locarno	19
2	(Switzerland) Shkëlzen Gashi	Aarau	17
2	(Switzerland) Moreno Merenda	Vaduz	17
2	(Switzerland) Igor Tadić	Kriens	17
5	(North Macedonia) Adis Jahović	Wil	16
6	(Argentina) Ezequiel Scarione	St. Gallen	15
7	(Switzerland) Alessandro Ciarrocchi	Bellinzona	14
7	(Brazil) Odirlei de Souza Gaspar	Wohlen	14
7	(Italy) Giuseppe Morello	Biel-Bienne	14
10	(Slovenia) Džengis Čavušević	Wil	13
11	(France) Frédéric Besseyre	Stade Nyonnais	11
11	(Switzerland) Remo Staubli	Aarau	11
13	(Cameroon) Franck Etoundi	St. Gallen	10
13	(Argentina) Gastón Magnetti	Bellinzona	10
13	(Switzerland) Marco Mathys	St. Gallen	10

- Updated 4 July 2012
- "Challenge League - Switzerland". Soccerway. Archived from the original on March 15, 2013.
