= Eric Tia =

Ivorian footballer

Personal information
- Full name: Chef Eric Tia
- Date of birth: 28 November 1996 (age 29)
- Place of birth: Marcory, Ivory Coast
- Height: 1.79 m (5 ft 10 in)
- Position: Forward

Team information
- Current team: Cham
- Number: 24

Senior career*
Years	Team	Apps	(Gls)
2014–2017	Chur 97	43	(16)
2017–2019	Zürich U21	30	(4)
2019–2020	Luzern	2	(0)
2019–2020	Luzern U21	20	(8)
2020	Neuchâtel Xamax	4	(0)
2021–2023	Bellinzona	43	(3)
2023–2025	Rapperswil-Jona	51	(7)
2025–	Cham	32	(11)
- * Club domestic league appearances and goals as of 1 October 2026

Chef Eric Tia (born 28 November 1998) is an Ivorian professional footballer who plays as a forward for the Swiss club Cham.

== Professional career ==
In January 2014, Chef arrived in Switzerland as an asylum seeker. He soon joined Chur 97 after asking to try out, and worked his way into their first team soon after. On 18 February 2019, Tia signed a professional contract with FC Luzern. Chef made his professional debut with Luzern in a 1–0 Swiss Super League win over Servette FC on 4 August 2019.

For the 2021–22 season, he joined Bellinzona in the third-tier Swiss Promotion League. Upon his debut for Bellinzona, he appeared in all five top levels of the Swiss football leagues, from Swiss Super League to 2. Liga Interregional.

On 7 July 2023, FC Rapperswil-Jona announced the signing of Tia.
