= Marin Wiskemann =

Swiss footballer (born 1997)

Personal information
- Date of birth: 6 November 1997 (age 28)
- Place of birth: Zürich, Switzerland
- Height: 1.88 m (6 ft 2 in)
- Position: Striker

Team information
- Current team: SC Cham
- Number: 11

Senior career*
Years	Team	Apps	(Gls)
2016–2017	FC Unterstrass		
2018–2020	SV Höngg	14	(11)
2020–2023	SC Cham	77	(39)
2023–2024	FC Baden	32	(2)
2024–2025	Rapperswil-Jona	27	(9)
2025–	SC Cham	21	(9)
- * Club domestic league appearances and goals as of 1 October 2026

Marin Wiskemann (born 6 November 1997) is a Swiss footballer who plays as a striker for SC Cham.

== Early life ==
Wiskemann is a native of Zürich, Switzerland.

== Career ==
In 2020, he signed for Swiss side SC Cham, where he was regarded as one of the club's most important players.

== Personal life ==
Wiskemann is of Brazilian descent.
