= Sandro Burki =

Swiss footballer (born 1985)

Personal information
- Date of birth: 16 September 1985 (age 41)
- Place of birth: Oftringen, Switzerland
- Height: 1.87 m (6 ft 2 in)
- Position: Midfielder

Team information
- Current team: FC Aarau (Sporting director)

Youth career
- FC Zürich

Senior career*
| Years | Team | Apps | (Gls) |
| 2001–2002 | FC Zürich | 7 | (0) |
| 2002–2003 | Bayern Munich (A) | 2 | (0) |
| 2003–2005 | Young Boys | 21 | (0) |
| 2005 | FC Wil | 15 | (1) |
| 2005–2006 | FC Vaduz | 32 | (7) |
| 2006–2017 | FC Aarau | 340 | (22) |
| Total | | 417 | (30) |

International career
- Switzerland U17
| 2008 | Switzerland | 1 | (0) |

Managerial career
- 2017–: FC Aarau (sporting director)
Medal record
Men's football
Representing Switzerland
UEFA European Under-17 Championship
| Winner | 2002 Denmark |
- * Club domestic league appearances and goals

Sandro Burki (born 16 September 1985) is a Swiss former professional footballer who played as a midfielder. He is the sporting director of FC Aarau.

== Club career ==
Burki began his career with FC Zürich. Burki caught the attention of numerous clubs, eventually signing for FC Bayern Munich. However, the move was not successful, and was subsequently criticised by Swiss Football Association Technical Director Hansruedi Hasler claiming that "The examples of Philippe Senderos and Sandro Burki, who were both U17 European champions, show how important the choice of team is."

Returning within a year to the Swiss leagues, he played for BSC Young Boys, FC Wil and FC Vaduz before signing for FC Aarau, to whom he is contracted until 30 June 2011.

== International career ==
Burki is a former youth international and was in the Swiss U-17 squad that won the 2002 U-17 European Championships.

He made his senior Switzerland international debut against Cyprus on 22 August 2008, after which he was linked in the press with a move to Celtic.

== Honours ==
- UEFA U-17 European Champion: 2002
