= SC Cham =

Swiss football club

- Full name: Sportclub Cham
- Founded: 1910; 116 years ago
- Ground: Stadion Eizmoos, Cham (1. Liga); Herti Allmend, Zug (Challenge League); Switzerland
- Capacity: 1,800
- Chairman: Rolf Tresch
- Manager: Pascal Nussbaumer
- League: Promotion League
- 2024–25: 6th of 18
- Website: https://www.sccham.ch
| Home colours | Away colours |

SC Cham 1910 is a Swiss football team based in Cham and currently play in the Promotion League, the third tier of Swiss football. The team were founded in 1910.

== History ==
The club was founded on 14 June 1910 and was the first football club in Canton Zug. They were originally known as Football-Club Cham. The club made it to the Challenge League in the 1998–99 season. They were relegated shortly afterwards but managed to return for the 2002–03 season. At the end of the 2007/08 season the club were relegated to the 1. Liga.

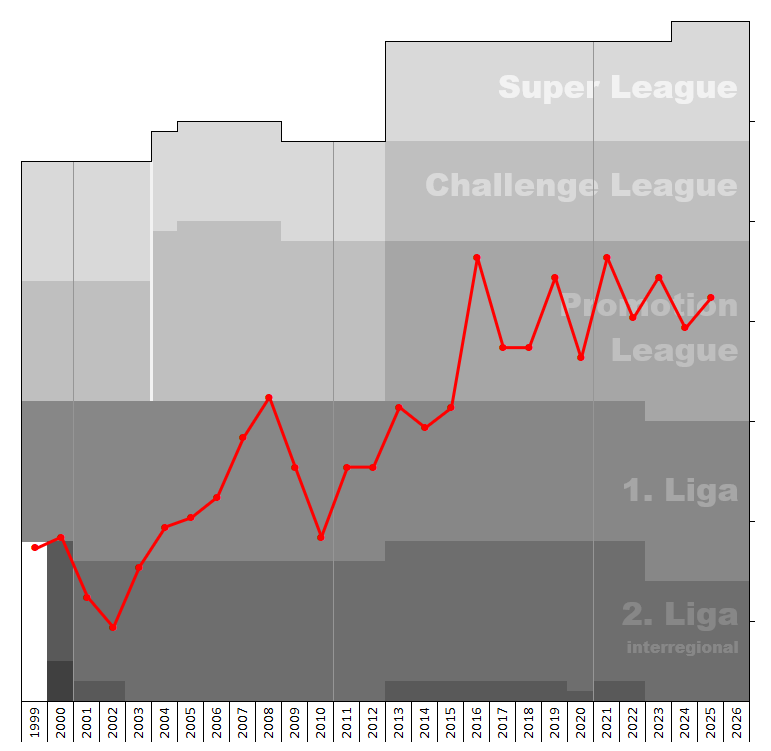
Chart of SC Cham table positions in the Swiss football league system

== Stadium ==
The club plays its home games at Eizmoos which has a capacity of 1,800. The last time the stadium was full was in 2006 against FC Aarau. The stadium is not of a good enough standard to play in the Challenge League so in 2006–07 season and 2007–08 season the club had to play their home games at Zug 94's stadium, the Herti Allmend Stadion.

== Players ==
=== Current squad ===
As of 20 September 2026

Note: Flags indicate national team as defined under FIFA eligibility rules; some limited exceptions apply. Players may hold more than one non-FIFA nationality.

| No. | Pos. | Nation | Player |
|---|---|---|---|
| 1 | GK | SUI | Diego Heller |
| 3 | DF | SUI | Fabio Niederhauser |
| 4 | DF | DEN | Nikolai Andersen |
| 6 | MF | SUI | Iwan Hegglin |
| 7 | MF | SUI | Marvin Bieri |
| 8 | MF | SUI | Yannick Pauli |
| 9 | FW | POR | André Ribeiro |
| 10 | MF | SUI | Matteo Pasquarelli |
| 11 | FW | SUI | Marin Wiskemann |
| 12 | DF | SUI | Nando Zimmermann |
| 13 | DF | SUI | Jan Gehrig |
| 14 | MF | SUI | Lino Lang |
| 16 | MF | SUI | Noah Flühmann |

| No. | Pos. | Nation | Player |
|---|---|---|---|
| 17 | MF | SUI | Ivan Cornacchini |
| 19 | MF | SUI | Ajdin Bajric |
| 20 | GK | SUI | Jan-Peter Zaugg |
| 21 | MF | ESP | Jorge Facal |
| 22 | DF | SUI | Sven Haag |
| 23 | FW | ALB | Florian Kamberi |
| 24 | MF | CIV | Eric Tia |
| 26 | DF | SUI | Luca Heuberger |
| 27 | MF | SUI | Noé Boum (on loan from Rapperswil-Jona) |
| 29 | DF | SUI | Mario Bühler |
| 30 | MF | SUI | Laurin Vögele |
| 38 | MF | SUI | Minas Mekonen |
| 39 | MF | SUI | Janis Wyss |
