= Ridge Mobulu =

Swiss-born Congolese footballer

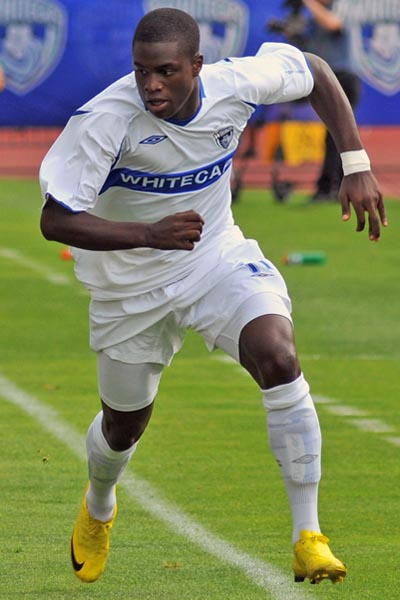

Personal information
- Full name: Ridge Mickael Mobulu
- Date of birth: 29 June 1991 (age 35)
- Place of birth: Aigle, Switzerland
- Height: 5 ft 8 in (1.73 m)
- Position: Left winger

Team information
- Current team: Bavois
- Number: 29

Youth career
- 1996–2003: FC Aigle
- 2003–2005: FC Yvorne
- 2005–2008: Lausanne-Sport

Senior career*
Years	Team	Apps	(Gls)
2008–2010	Lausanne-Sport	21	(5)
2010	→ Bulle (loan)	12	(3)
2010	Vancouver Whitecaps	9	(1)
2011–2012	Stade Nyonnais	8	(1)
2012–2013	Yverdon	15	(3)
2013–2014	Le Mont	32	(8)
2014–2015	Luzern	12	(2)
2015–2016	Aarau	21	(2)
2016–2017	Le Mont	24	(6)
2017–2018	Stade Nyonnais	32	(6)
2019–2022	Yverdon	54	(13)
2021–2022	Yverdon II	2	(1)
2022	Naters	5	(3)
2023	Paradiso	3	(1)
2023–2024	Naters	26	(17)
2024–2025	Vevey-Sports	18	(10)
2025–	Bavois	9	(2)

International career
2005	Switzerland U-15		
- * Club domestic league appearances and goals as of 22 June 2025

Ridge Mobulu -son of Ogamyanu Mobulu (born 29 June 1991) is a Swiss-born Congolese footballer who plays for Swiss Promotion League club Bavois.

== Career ==
=== Youth ===
Mobulu grew up in Lausanne.

=== Professional ===
Mobulu made his professional debut with Lausanne-Sport on 9 December 2007, in a game against Winterthur in Switzerland's second division Challenge League. He made 20 appearances for Lausanne in the 2009–10, scoring five goals, and spent six month on loan with Bulle of Switzerland's third-tier 1. Liga between January and June 2010.

Mobulu moved to Canada in the summer of 2010 to join the Vancouver Whitecaps, initially as a member of the team's PDL affiliate Vancouver Whitecaps Residency. He made his full Whitecaps debut on 28 July, coming on as a second-half substitute for Blake Wagner during a 1–0 away win over Montreal Impact, and scored his first Whitecaps goal during a 2–2 home draw versus Austin Aztex on 29 August.

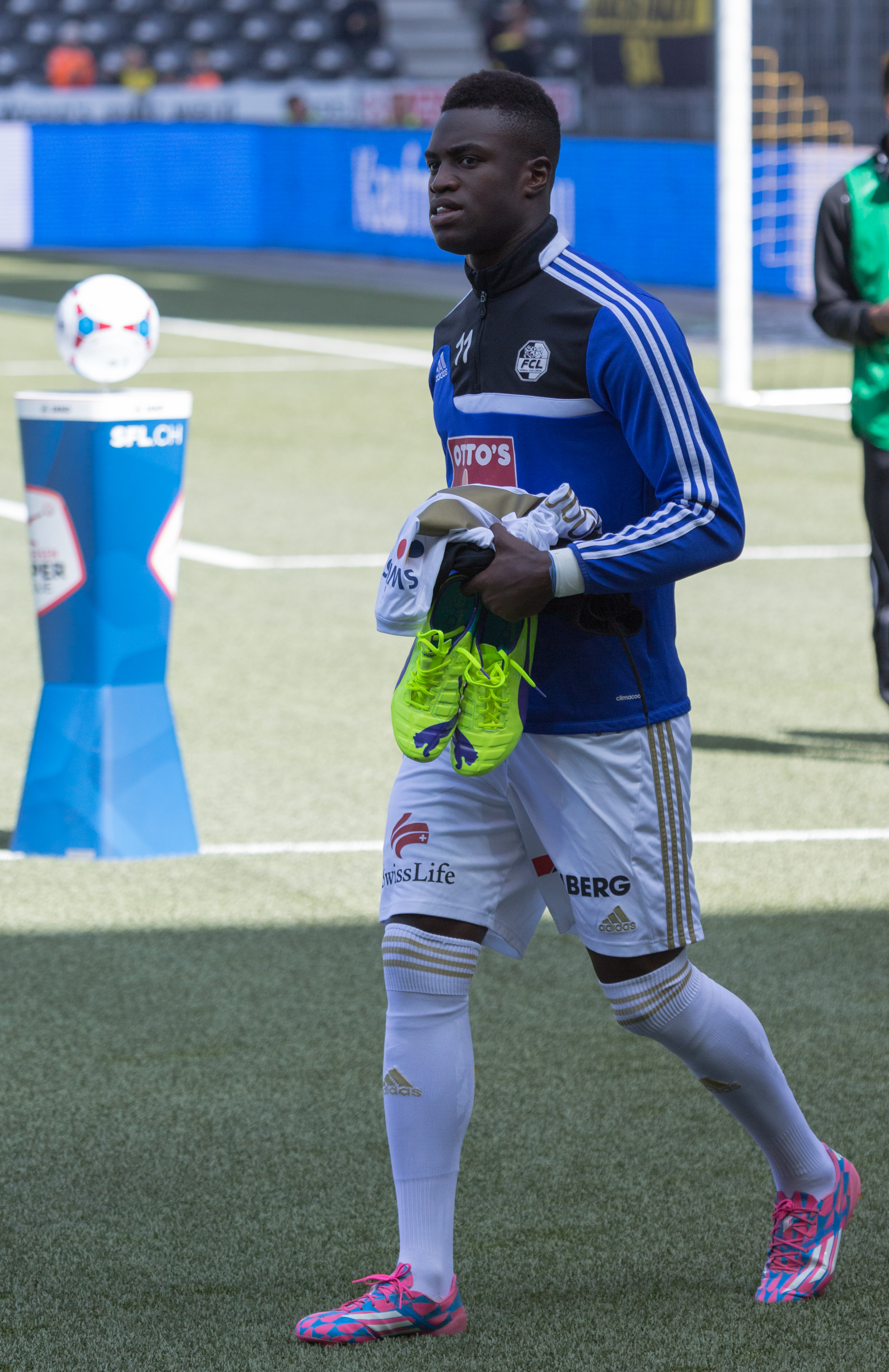
Mobulu playing for FC Luzern

On 4 January 2019, Mobulu re-joined Yverdon-Sport FC.

=== International ===
Mobulu played with the Swiss national U-15 team in 2005, but has since declared his intention to play for the Democratic Republic of the Congo should the opportunity arise. Though born and raised in Switzerland, Mobulu is a citizen of DR Congo through his parents, Ngia Jose Nzobo and Florent Kashama Mobulu.
