= Christopher Teichmann =

German-Swiss footballer (born 1995)

Personal information
- Date of birth: 13 October 1995 (age 31)
- Place of birth: Germany
- Height: 1.83 m (6 ft 0 in)
- Position: Midfielder

Team information
- Current team: Zug 94

Youth career
- Aarau

Senior career*
Years	Team	Apps	(Gls)
2013–2016	Aarau	13	(0)
2013	→ Baden (loan)	8	(0)
2014–2015	→ Old Boys (loan)	24	(9)
2016–2017	Young Fellows Juventus	18	(5)
2017–2023	Baden	143	(79)
2024–	Zug 94	0	(0)

International career^{‡}
2012	Switzerland U18	2	(0)
2014	Switzerland U19	2	(0)
- * Club domestic league appearances and goals as of 26 October 2023 ‡ National team caps and goals as of 16 April 2014

Christopher Teichmann (born 13 October 1995) is a German-Swiss professional footballer who plays as a midfielder for Zug 94.

== Career ==
Born in Germany, Teichmann made his professional debut for FC Aarau of the Swiss Super League on 13 July 2013 against FC Basel in the opening match of the season, in which he started and played 76 minutes as Aarau lost the match 3–1.

On 7 January 2016, Teichmann announced his retirement from professional football to concentrate on his education. He resumed his playing career in the summer of 2016.

== Career statistics ==
As of match played 21 November 2015

Appearances and goals by club, season and competition
Club	Season	League			National Cup		Total	
Club	Season	Division	Apps	Goals	Apps	Goals	Apps	Goals
Aarau	2013–14	Super League	8	0	1	0	9	0
Aarau	2014–15	Super League	0	0	0	0	0	0
Aarau	2015–16	Challenge League	5	0	0	0	5	0
Aarau	Total		13	0	1	0	14	0
Career total			13	0	1	0	14	0
