= Gastón Magnetti =

Argentine-Spanish footballer

Personal information
- Full name: Gastón Orlando Magnetti
- Date of birth: 19 January 1985 (age 41)
- Place of birth: Argentina
- Height: 1.82 m (5 ft 11 1/2 in)
- Position: Forward

Team information
- Current team: FC Collina d'Oro
- Number: 23

Senior career*
Years	Team	Apps	(Gls)
2006–2008	Ferro		
2008	Kriens	13	(1)
2008–2012	Chiasso	91	(53)
2012–2013	Bellinzona	37	(7)
2013–2015	Chiasso	53	(8)
2015–2022	Bellinzona	114	(96)
2022–	FC Collina d'Oro	4	(3)
- * Club domestic league appearances and goals as of 24 September 2022

Gastón Orlando Magnetti (born 19 January 1985) is an Argentine-Spanish footballer who plays for Swiss club FC Collina d'Oro as a centre-forward.
