= Juan Pablo Garat =

Argentine footballer

Juan Garat
Personal information
- Full name: Juan Pablo Garat
- Date of birth: April 19, 1983 (age 43)
- Place of birth: Avellaneda, Argentina
- Height: 1.86 m (6 ft 1 in)
- Position: Defender

Youth career
- 1993–2004: Atlanta

Senior career*
Years	Team	Apps	(Gls)
2004–2005	Atlanta	8	(0)
2005–2009	St. Gallen	76	(4)
2009–2010	Tigre	15	(1)
2010	Dinamo București	10	(1)
2011–2018	Aarau	169	(11)
2018–2020	Baden	22	(1)
Total		300	(18)
- * Club domestic league appearances and goals as of 4 October 2020

Juan Pablo Garat (born 19 April 1983) is an Argentine former footballer.

== Career ==
=== Atlanta and St. Gallen ===
Garat was born on 19 April 1983 in Avellaneda, Argentina and began playing junior-level football in 1993 at Atlanta. He started playing for Atlanta's senior squad during the 2004–05 Torneo Argentino A season.

In 2005, Garat joined St. Gallen, making his Swiss Super League debut on 16 July under coach Ralf Loose in a 3–1 home loss to FC Zürich. He scored his first goal in the competition on 21 April 2007 in a 1–1 draw against Grasshopper. Subsequently, he played in both legs and scored once in the 3–1 aggregate loss to Dacia Chișinău in the second round of the 2007 Intertoto Cup. St. Gallen suffered relegation at the end of the 2007–08 season, but Garat stayed with the club, helping the team gain promotion back to the first league after one year.

=== Tigre and Dinamo București ===
In 2009, Garat went to play for Tigre. He made his Argentine Primera División debut on 12 September 2009 in a 2–1 loss to Arsenal de Sarandí, playing as a starter under coach Diego Cagna, but after suffering an injury, he was replaced in the 7th minute with Maximiliano Oliva. On 4 April 2010, he scored his first goal in the competition with a header in a 2–0 win over Newell's Old Boys.

On 15 June 2010, Garat signed for Dinamo București. His Liga I debut took place on 25 July, when coach Ioan Andone sent him in the 65th minute to replace Cosmin Moți in a 2–1 away victory against Astra Ploiești. On 1 August, he scored his first goal in the league with a header following a cross from Cătălin Munteanu in a 5–3 victory against Sportul Studențesc București. Garat played three matches during the 2010–11 Europa League qualifiers, as Dinamo got past Olimpia Bălți in the second round before they were defeated in the following round by Hajduk Split against whom he scored once.

=== Aarau and Baden ===
Garat left Dinamo in December 2010 and joined Swiss second-tier club Aarau in the summer of 2011. He helped the team gain promotion to the first league at the end of the 2012–13 season. Afterwards, in the first round of the following season, he scored a goal in the 3–1 loss to FC Basel. He made his last appearance in the Swiss top-league on 25 May 2015 in a 5–1 loss to St. Gallen, as Aarau was relegated back to the second league. Garat has accumulated a total of 110 appearances with six goals in the Swiss Super League. He played for Aarau for a further three seasons before joining Baden in 2018, ending his career in 2020.

== Honours ==
St. Gallen

- Swiss Challenge League: 2008–09

Aarau

- Swiss Challenge League: 2012–13
