= Stadio Comunale Bellinzona =

Multi-use stadium in Bellinzona, Switzerland

- Comunale
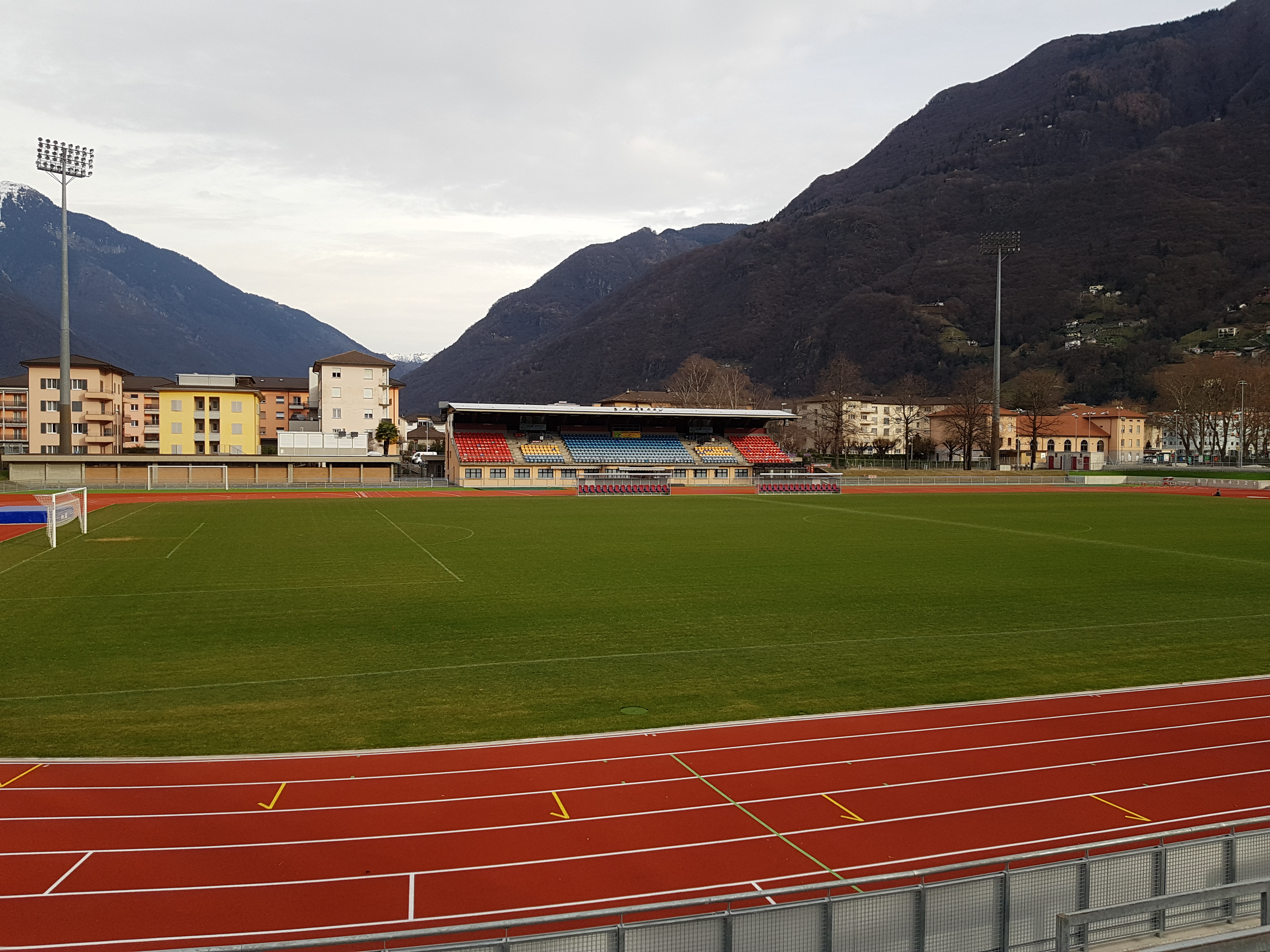
- Interactive map of Stadio Comunale Bellinzona
- Location: Bellinzona, Ticino, Switzerland
- Coordinates: 46.198082°N 9.022304°E
- Owner: Bellinzona
- Capacity: 5,000
- Surface: Grass
- Field size: 105 m × 68 m (344 ft × 223 ft)

Construction
- Built: 1946–1947
- Opened: 27 May 1947
- Renovated: 2009
- Cost: CHF 550,000 (1946)
- Architect: Renato Solari

Tenant
- AC Bellinzona (1947–present)

Stadio Comunale Bellinzona is a multi-use stadium in Bellinzona, Switzerland. It is currently used mostly for football matches and is the home stadium of AC Bellinzona. As of 2009, the stadium has an official capacity of 5,000 people, but could hold up to 20,740. The stadium has 600 seats.

Here is a breakdown of the capacities of each of the five stands of the stadium:

| Stand | Seats |
|---|---|
| Tribuna Principale | 600 |
| Settore Laterale-Est | 450 |
| Settore Laterale-Ovest | 450 |
| Tribuna Giubiasco (Gradinata) | 3,000 |
| Settore Ospiti (Away Sector) | 500 |
| Total | 5,000 |

== League attendance figures ==
Information related to league matches held at the Stadio Comunale by AC Bellinzona in the last 20 years in the tiers of the Swiss Football Association is listed below.

| Season | Average |
|---|---|
| 1999–00 Nationalliga B | 4,614 |
| 2000–01 Nationalliga B | 1,800 |
| 2002–03 Nationalliga B | 1,700 |
| 2003–04 Swiss Challenge League | 1,334 |
| 2004–05 Swiss Challenge League | 2,223 |
| 2005–06 Swiss Challenge League | 979 |
| 2006–07 Swiss Challenge League | 1,876 |
| 2007–08 Swiss Challenge League | 2,295 |
| 2008–09 Swiss Super League | 4,012 |
| 2009–10 Swiss Super League | 3,298 |
| 2010–11 Swiss Super League | 3,338 |
| 2011–12 Swiss Challenge League | 2,498 |
| 2012–13 Swiss Challenge League | 1,926 |
| 2015–2016 2. Liga Interregional | 798 |
| 2016–17 Swiss 1. Liga | 1002 |
| 2017–18 Swiss 1. Liga | 1068 |

== International matches ==
| 18 October 1980 Friendly (Girls) | Switzerland | 2–1 | Italy | Bellinzona, Switzerland |
| 18:15 (CET) | Krummenacher 7'; Juffer 14' | Report | 66' Elisabetta Vignotto | Stadium: Stadio Comunale Bellinzona; Attendance: 600 |

| 25 March 1987 Friendly (Men) | Switzerland | 1–2 | Czechoslovakia | Bellinzona, Switzerland |
| | Július Bielik 11' (o.g.) | Report | 75' Luboš Kubík; 80' Luboš Kubík | Stadium: Stadio Comunale Bellinzona; Attendance: 5300; Referee: Paolo Casarin (Italy) |

| 25 February 2006 Friendly (Girls) | Switzerland | 2–3 | Denmark | Bellinzona, Switzerland |
| 13:00 (CET) | Vanessa Bürki 21'; Flavia Schwarz 60' | Report | 42' Lene Jensen; 62' Eggers Nielsen; 74' Maiken Pape | Stadium: Stadio Comunale Bellinzona; Attendance: 220; Referee: Esther Staubli (Switzerland) |

== See also ==
- List of football stadiums in Switzerland
