= Johnny Szlykowicz =

Polish-French footballer (born 1980)

Personal information
- Full name: Jonathan Szlykowicz
- Date of birth: December 3, 1980 (age 45)
- Place of birth: Beaune, France
- Height: 1.76 m (5 ft 9 in)
- Position: Midfielder

Youth career
- 1999–2002: AJ Auxerre

Senior career*
Years	Team	Apps	(Gls)
2002–2004	Pau FC	46	(8)
2005–2006	SR Delémont	33	(18)
2006–2009	Neuchâtel Xamax	57	(5)
2009	FC Lausanne-Sport	10	(4)
- * Club domestic league appearances and goals

Johnny Szlykowicz (born 3 December 1980) is a former Polish-French football player.

== Career ==
He signed a contract with Neuchâtel Xamax on 5 September 2006, after scored 4 goals in 5 games at the start of season for SR Delémont.

== Personal life ==
His father Zbigniew Szłykowicz was a professional footballer.
