= Kim Jaggy =

Swiss-born Haitian footballer (born 1982)

Personal information
- Full name: Kim Jaggy
- Date of birth: 14 November 1982 (age 44)
- Place of birth: Varen, Switzerland
- Height: 1.76 m (5 ft 9 in)
- Positions: Defender; left back

Team information
- Current team: FC Eschenbach SG
- Number: 15

Youth career
- Hochdorf
- Aarau

Senior career*
Years	Team	Apps	(Gls)
1999–2007	Grasshopper	83	(0)
2007–2009	Sparta Rotterdam	47	(0)
2009–2011	Skoda Xanthi	45	(0)
2011–2014	FC Wil	62	(1)
2013–2014	→ FC Aarau (loan)	33	(0)
2014–2016	FC Aarau	97	(0)
2016–2018	FC Rapperswil-Jona	46	(1)
2018–2025	FC Tuggen	81	(2)
2025–	FC Eschenbach SG	0	(0)

International career^{‡}
2000–2004	Switzerland U21	23	(0)
2011–	Haiti	19	(1)
- * Club domestic league appearances and goals as of 3 August 2020 ‡ National team caps and goals as of 23 July 2013

Kim Jaggy (born 14 November 1982) is a professional footballer who plays as a left-sided defender for FC Eschenbach SG. Born in Switzerland, he plays for the Haiti national football team.

== Club career ==
Jaggy made his debut for Swiss league side Grasshopper in the 1999–2000 season and stayed with them for 10 seasons. In summer 2007 he signed a two-years contract with Dutch Eredivisie outfit Sparta Rotterdam.

In summer 2009 he was deemed surplus to requirements at Sparta and subsequently joined Greek side Skoda Xanthi.

After a two-year spell at the Greek club, Jaggy signed for FC Wil on 19 July 2011.

== Honours ==
- Swiss Championship
  - Winner (2): 2000–01, 2002–03
