= Igor N'Ganga =

Congolese footballer

Igor Nganga
Personal information
- Date of birth: 14 April 1987 (age 39)
- Place of birth: Kinshasa, Zaire
- Height: 1.84 m (6 ft 0 in)
- Position: Defender

Senior career*
Years	Team	Apps	(Gls)
2003–2005	Lausanne-Sport	25	(0)
2005–2007	Young Boys	4	(0)
2005–2007	Young Boys B	34	(1)
2008	→ FC Chiasso (loan)	19	(2)
2008–2011	FC Schaffhausen	84	(5)
2011–2016	FC Aarau	144	(17)
2016–2017	FC Wil	16	(2)
2017–2018	FC Aarau	39	(3)
2018–2020	Lausanne-Sport	55	(3)

International career
2011–2015	Congo	15	(0)
- * Club domestic league appearances and goals

Igor Nganga (born 14 April 1987) is a Congolese former football player.

N'Ganga had a brief spell in the Swiss Super League with BSC Young Boys.

He attracted media attention in November 2014 as the result of a penalty incident during a game against FC Zürich. Zürich were awarded a penalty which was taken by Amine Chermiti. Goalkeeper Joël Mall saved the initial shot but it rebounded back to Chermiti who shot again, but Mall saved the second shot as well. Chermiti then had a third shot at goal but this time it was acrobatically hooked off the line by N'Ganga.
