= Charles-André Doudin =

Swiss footballer (born 1986)

Personal information
- Date of birth: 12 September 1986 (age 40)
- Place of birth: Payerne, Switzerland
- Height: 1.84 m (6 ft 1/2 in)
- Position: Attacking midfielder

Senior career*
Years	Team	Apps	(Gls)
2005	Neuchâtel Xamax		
2006	Meyrin		
2006–2007	Delémont		
2007–2009	La Chaux-de-Fonds		
2009–2010	Lugano	13	(2)
2010–2013	Biel-Bienne	79	(23)
2013–2020	Neuchâtel Xamax	181	(50)
- * Club domestic league appearances and goals as of 23 July 2020

Charles-André Doudin (born 12 September 1986) is a Swiss professional footballer who plays as an attacking midfielder.

== Career ==
Born in Payerne, Doudin has played for Neuchâtel Xamax, Meyrin, Delémont, La Chaux-de-Fonds, Lugano and Biel-Bienne.

In December 2016 he signed a new contract with Neuchâtel Xamax, until 2019.
