= Patrick Rossini =

Swiss footballer (born 2 April 1988)

Patrick Rossini (born 2 April 1988) is a Swiss footballer who plays as a striker for FC Collina d'Oro.

== Early life ==
Rossini grew up in Giubiasco, Switzerland.

== Career ==
Rossini played for Swiss side FC Aarau, where he was regarded as one of the club's most important players.

== Style of play ==
Rossini mainly operates as a striker and has been described as "not a giant today, but thanks to his excellent timing he is a good header player".

== Personal life ==
Rossini has been married and has two children.
