= Igor Djuric (Swiss footballer) =

Swiss football player (born 1988)

Personal information
- Date of birth: 30 August 1988 (age 38)
- Place of birth: Bellinzona, Switzerland
- Height: 1.82 m (6 ft 0 in)
- Position: Defender

Team information
- Current team: Echallens
- Number: 5

Youth career
- Bellinzona

Senior career*
Years	Team	Apps	(Gls)
2005–2006	Bellinzona	15	(0)
2006–2010	Udinese	0	(0)
2008–2009	→ Arezzo (loan)	9	(0)
2009	→ Eupen (loan)	0	(0)
2010	→ Bellinzona (loan)	0	(0)
2010–2011	→ Kriens (loan)	24	(2)
2011–2012	Kriens	25	(1)
2012–2014	Chiasso	71	(7)
2014–2016	Lugano	17	(1)
2016–2022	Neuchâtel Xamax	124	(3)
2022–	Echallens	8	(1)

International career
2006	Switzerland U19	1	(0)
2008	Switzerland U20	3	(0)
2009–2010	Switzerland U21	4	(1)
- * Club domestic league appearances and goals as of 1 October 2022

Igor Djuric (Serbian: Igor Đurić; born 30 August 1988) is a Swiss professional footballer who plays as a defender for Swiss 1. Liga club Echallens.

== Career ==
Djuric made a number of appearances for AC Bellinzona in the 2005–06 season of the Swiss Challenge League. On 3 February 2010, he returned to Bellinzona on loan after four years at Udinese.

On 16 June 2010, he left for SC Kriens on a one-year contract.

On 14 August 2015, he was given a 12-match suspension and a fine of CHF 8,000 by the Swiss Football Association, together with his Lugano teammate, Patrick Rossini, for paying prizes to players from Schaffhausen in the event of a draw or victory against Servette. On 17 September 2015, the court of appeals significantly reduced the sentence to a two-day suspension and a fine of CHF 5,000.

On 5 September 2016, Djuric signed a one-year contract with an option for an additional year with Neuchâtel Xamax. On 21 June 2019, he signed a contract extension until 2021 with Xamax.

== International career ==
Djuric was born in Switzerland and is of Serbian descent. Djuric represented the Swiss under-19 team in the 2007 UEFA European Under-19 Football Championship qualifying round.

== Honours ==
Lugano

- Swiss Challenge League: 2014–15

Neuchâtel Xamax

- Swiss Challenge League: 2017–18
