= Sven Lüscher =

Swiss footballer (born 1984)

Personal information
- Date of birth: 5 March 1984 (age 42)
- Place of birth: Switzerland
- Height: 1.80 m (5 ft 11 in)
- Position: Striker

Senior career*
Years	Team	Apps	(Gls)
2001–2003	FC Aarau	2	(0)
2005–2006	SC Zofingen	28	(12)
2006–2008	SC Kriens	57	(15)
2008	BSC Young Boys	8	(0)
2009–2013	FC Winterthur	114	(25)
2013–2016	FC Aarau	104	(21)
- * Club domestic league appearances and goals

Sven Lüscher (born 5 March 1984) is a Swiss former footballer.

== Career ==
Lüscher started his career at FC Aarau and played two Nationalliga A games. In the 2005–06 season, he scored 12 goals in 28 games for SC Zofingen at 1. Liga (Also within Aargau canton). On 10 July 2006, he was signed by Challenge League side SC Kriens. In May 2008, he signed a two-year contract with Super League side BSC Young Boys on a free transfer. He left on 20 January 2009 Bern and moved to FC Winterthur.

== Honours ==
Individual

- Swiss Super League Goal of the Year: 2017–18
