= Alain Schultz =

Swiss footballer and manager (born 1983)

Personal information
- Full name: Alain Schultz
- Date of birth: 17 February 1983 (age 43)
- Place of birth: Binningen, Switzerland
- Height: 1.76 m (5 ft 9 in)
- Position: Forward

Team information
- Current team: Wohlen II (Manager)

Youth career
- Basel
- Aarau

Senior career*
Years	Team	Apps	(Gls)
2002–2004	Aarau	20	(0)
2003	→ Wohlen (loan)	12	(2)
2004–2011	Wohlen	170	(59)
2009–2010	→ Grasshoppers (loan)	31	(4)
2011–2014	Aarau	87	(20)
2015–2019	Wohlen	107	(18)
2019–2020	Wohlen II		
2020–2023	Sarmenstorf		

Managerial career
- 2019–2020: Wohlen II (player-assistant)
- 2021–2023: Wohlen (youth coach)
- 2023–: Wohlen II
- * Club domestic league appearances and goals as of 11:24, 10 September 2019 (UTC)

Alain Schultz (born 17 February 1983) is a retired Swiss association footballer and current manager for the reserve team of FC Wohlen.

== Career ==
=== Coaching and later career ===
In May 2019, Schultz announced that he was quitting professional football. In the following 2019–20 season, Schultz served as a playing assistant coach for FC Wohlen's reserve team.

Ahead of the 2020–21 season, Schultz joined FC Sarmenstorf as a player; a club, at the time, coached by his friend and former teammate, Michael Winsauer. Alongside this, Schultz also worked as a youth coach at FC Wohlen. He left FC Sarmenstorf at the end of the 2022–23 season.

On 29 April 2023 it was confirmed, that Schultz had been appointed manager of FC Wohlen's reserve team.
