= Dante Senger =

Argentine footballer (born 1983)

Personal information
- Full name: Dante Adrián Senger
- Date of birth: 4 March 1983 (age 43)
- Place of birth: Juan José Castelli, Chaco, Argentina
- Height: 1.88 m (6 ft 2 in)
- Position: Striker

Senior career*
Years	Team	Apps	(Gls)
2005–2006	Estudiantes	15	(0)
2006–2007	FC Locarno	22	(12)
2007–2008	Quilmes	17	(3)
2008–2010	FC Locarno	46	(33)
2010–2012	FC Lugano	41	(28)
2012–2015	FC Aarau	79	(14)
2015–2017	Neuchâtel Xamax FCS	49	(12)
2017–2020	Losone Sportiva		
- * Club domestic league appearances and goals

Dante Adrián Senger (born 4 March 1983) is an Argentine former footballer.

== Career ==
He was FC Locarno's topscorer after the departure of Juan Sara.
