= 1997–98 Swiss Cup =

Tournament details
- Country: Switzerland
- Teams: 182

Final positions
- Champions: Lausanne-Sport
- Runners-up: St. Gallen

Tournament statistics
- Matches played: 181

The 1997–98 Swiss Cup was the 73rd season of Switzerland's football cup competition organised annually by the Swiss Football Association. The competition began on 3 August 1997 with the first game of Round 1 and ended on 1 June 1998 with the final, which was held at the former Wankdorf in Bern. The winners earned a place in the qualifying round of the Cup Winners' Cup.

== Overview ==
The competition began on 3 August with the first game of the first round, but the majority of the matches were played during the week-end of 9–10 August. the competition ended on Whit Monday 1 June 1996 with the final held at the former Wankdorf Stadium in Bern. This year saw some modifications in the early rounds. The 12 clubs from the Nationalliga B were granted byes for the first three rounds. The 12 clubs from the Nationalliga A were granted byes for the first four rounds. The winners of the cup qualified themselves for the first round of the Cup Winners' Cup in the following season.

When possible, the draw respected regionalities and the lower classed team was granted home advantage. In the entire competition, the matches were played in a single knockout format. In the event of a draw after 90 minutes, the match went into extra time. In the event of a draw at the end of extra time, a penalty shoot-out was to decide which team qualified for the next round. No replays were foreseen in the entire competition.

== Round 1 ==
In the first round a total of 158 amateur clubs participated from the third-tier and lower. Reserve teams were not admitted to the competition. The draw respected regionalities, when possible, and the lower classed team was granted home advantage.

Team 1	Score	Team 2
3 August 1997
FC Konolfingen	1–1 (a.e.t.) (5–4 p)	FC Interlaken
6 August 1997
FC Birr	1–5	FC Schwamendingen
7 August 1997
FC Herzogenbuchsee	0–4	FC Kirchberg SG
FC St. Margrethen	1–2	Kreuzlingen
8 August 1997
FC Hergiswil	1–3	FC Dulliken
9 August 1997
FC Porrentruy	4–1	Old Boys
FC Kirchberg (BE)	0–3	SC Derendingen
SC Worb	1–4	FC Marly
FC Wyler Bern	1–2	FC Ostermundigen
FC Therwil	2–5	Burgdorf
SC Siebnen	0–2 (a.e.t.)	FC Buttikon
FC Ecublens	2–1	FC La Sallaz Lausanne
FC Portalban-Gletterens	4–1	FC Moudon
FC Orpund	3–1	FC Fontainemelon
FC Massongex	0–2 (a.e.t.)	FC Savièse
FC Visp	1–2	FC Salgesch
FC Collex-Bossy	1–1 (a.e.t.) (3–2 p)	Signal FC (Bernex)
ES Malley	5–2	FC Vernier
FC Forward Morges	3–4 (a.e.t.)	FC Epalinges
FC La Tour/Le Paquier	0–2	FC Châtel-St-Denis
US Collombey-Muraz	1–0	FC Chalais
FC Etagnières	0–3	FC Saint-Légier
FC Stade Payerne	3–1	CS Romontois
FC Altbüron-Grossdietwil	1–2	FC Willisau
FC Sarnen	1–1 (a.e.t.) (5–4 p)	FC Schönenwerd
FC Winznau	3–2	Zofingen
FC Turgi	1–3 (a.e.t.)	Brugg
CB Laax	1–4	FC Walenstadt
FC Töss (Winterthur)	2–4	FC Mönchaltorf
FC Tössfeld (Winterthur)	2–3	FC Fortuna (SG)
FC Wülflingen	0–2	FC Uznach
Biaschesi	3–0	Malcantone Agno
10 August 1997
FC Zollikofen	3–3 (a.e.t.) (6–7 p)	FC Azzurri Bienne
Black Stars	3–0	Moutier
FC Pfäffikon	5–2	FC Horgen
FC Wetzikon	2–0	FC Bazenheid
SC Aadorf	0–3	FC Winkeln SG
FC Wallisellen	3–0	FC Juventina Wettingen
FC Oetwil am See	1–2	FC Baar
FC Beringen	1–2	FC Widnau
FC Echichens	1–3	Le Mont-sur-Lausanne
Laufen	3–2	FC Alle
FC Bilten	3–10	FC Stäfa ZH
FC Trübbach	1–6	Cham
FC Flawil	1–2 (a.e.t.)	SC Veltheim (Winterthur)
FC Develier	0–3	FC Aesch
FC St-Paul Vésenaz	1–0	FC Cologny-Geneva
SC Reiden	0–1	FC Subingen
FC Alpnach	8–3 (a.e.t.)	SC Schöftland
FC Goldau	2–6	Wohlen
FC Cortaillod	0–4 (a.e.t.)	FC Lamboing
Uster	0–1	Blue Stars
FC Landquart	1–0	FC Flums
AS Italiana Bern	2–1	Düdingen
FC Tresa/Monteggio	0–3	AS Lamone-Cadempino
US Arbedo	4–1	SC Erstfeld
FC Bôle	3–1 (a.e.t.)	FC Deportivo
FC Fislisbach	0–6	FC Seefeld Zürich
12 August 1997
Dornach	4–0	SC Baudepartement Basel

== Round 2 ==
Team 1	Score	Team 2
17–24 August 1997
FC Ecublens	0–2	Stade Lausanne
FC Lamboing	0–4	Serrières
FC Sarnen	1–1 (a.e.t.) (3–2 p)	Schötz
FC Portalban-Gletterens	1–1 (a.e.t.) (4–2 p)	FC Renens
FC Bôle	0–5	Colombier
FC Marly	2–1	SC Bümpliz
Black Stars	2–3	Biel-Bienne
FC Azzurri Bienne	3–1	FC Noiraigue
Burgdorf	1–6	Grenchen
SC Derendingen	1–6	Wangen bei Olten
FC Porrentruy	1–3	Concordia Basel
AS Italiana Bern	0–3	Bulle
Dornach	2–3	SV Lyss
FC Aesch	1–4	Köniz
FC Ostermundigen	3–2	Central Fribourg
FC Subingen	3–1	FC Riehen
Laufen	5–3	FC Klus-Balstahl
FC Konolfingen	1–10	Fribourg
FC Orpund	3–5	La Chaux-de-Fonds
FC Willisau	2–3	Münsingen
FC Savièse	2–1	Naters
Le Mont-sur-Lausanne	0–3	Chênois
FC Salgesch	0–6	Monthey
FC Collex-Bossy	1–2	Vevey Sports
FC St-Paul Vésenaz	1–4	Grand-Lancy
ES Malley	2–3	Stade Nyonnais
FC Epalinges	0–6	Meyrin
FC Châtel-St-Denis	3–1	Montreux-Sports
US Collombey-Muraz	3–1	Martigny-Sports
FC Widnau	0–2	FC Uznach
FC Saint-Légier	1–3 (a.e.t.)	Echallens
FC Winznau	1–8	Muttenz
FC Dulliken	0–2	Hochdorf
FC Alpnach	1–5	Buochs
Wohlen	1–3	FC Sursee
FC Wallisellen	1–6	FC Altstetten (Zürich)
Blue Stars	2–3	Bellinzona
FC Schwamendingen	0–1	FC Muri
FC Seefeld Zürich	0–2	Red Star
Brugg	1–1 (a.e.t.) (p. 8–7)	FC Suhr
FC Stäfa ZH	1–7	SC Cham
FC Baar	1–3 (a.e.t.)	Zug 94
FC Landquart	1–4	Tuggen
FC Buttikon	1–4 (a.e.t.)	Freienbach
FC Pfäffikon	1–8	Rapperswil-Jona
FC Walenstadt	1–1 (a.e.t.) (8–9 p)	FC Glarus
FC Mönchaltorf	0–2	FC Dübendorf
FC Wetzikon	0–5	YF Juventus
FC Fortuna (SG)	1–4	FC Rorschach
FC Winkeln (SG)	0–1	Bülach
SC Veltheim (Winterthur)	0–2 (a.e.t.)	Gossau
Kreuzlingen	1–1 (a.e.t.) (7–5 p)	Frauenfeld
AS Lamone-Cadempino	0–3 (a.e.t.)	Chiasso
GC Biaschesi	1–1 (a.e.t.) (5–4 p)	Mendrisio
US Arbedo	3–7	FC Ascona
FC Stade Payerne	1–6 awd 3–0	Bex

- ^1: Note to match Stade Payerne–Bex: the result was voided and awarded as a 3–0 victory for Stade Payerne, because Bex fielded the ineligible player Saydou Diallo.

== Round 3 ==
Team 1	Score	Team 2
6–7 September 1997
FC Dübendorf	4–5	YF Juventus
Wangen bei Olten	1–0	Hochdorf
FC Savièse	2–4	Echallens
FC Stade Payerne	1–0	Chênois
FC Glarus	0–3	Brugg
FC Ascona	1–1 (a.e.t.) (p. ?)	Buochs
Concordia Basel	0–1	Chiasso
Bulle	1–2	Monthey
FC Sursee	0–3	Muttenz
Bülach	0–1	Red Star
Zug 94	1–2	Rapperswil-Jona
FC Marly	3–3 (a.e.t.) (4–3 p)	Biel-Bienne
FC Azzurri Bienne	1–7	Grenchen
Freienbach	0–2	Tuggen
FC Châtel-St-Denis	5–0	US Collombey-Muraz
SV Lyss	2–0	Köniz
FC Ostermundigen	1–6	Serrières
Cham	2–1	FC Uznach
FC Subingen	0–0 (a.e.t.) (2–3 p)	FC Muri
Laufen	2–2 (a.e.t.) (4–5 p)	Bellinzona
Frauenfeld	3–1	FC Rorschach
Colombier	0–1	Fribourg
Vevey Sports	4–3	Grand-Lancy
FC Sarnen	0–2	GC Biaschesi
FC Portalban-Gletterens	0–2	Stade Nyonnais
La Chaux-de-Fonds	3–1	Münsingen
Gossau	4–1	FC Altstetten (Zürich)
Meyrin	3–1	Stade Lausanne

== Round 4 ==
The teams from the 1997–98 Nationalliga B (NLB) were granted byes for the first three rounds and they joined the competition in the fourth round. These 12 teams were seeded and cound not be drawn against each other. The draw respected regionalities, when possible, and the lower classed team was granted home advantage.

=== Summary ===
Team 1	Score	Team 2
19 September 1997
FC Stade Payerne	0–2	Stade Nyonnais
La Chaux-de-Fonds	1–3	Thun
Grenchen	0–1	Solothurn
FC Châtel-St-Denis	0–3	Meyrin
Gossau	1–3	FC Schaffhausen
FC Muri	0–2	Bellinzona
Frauenfeld	0–3	SV Schaffhausen
Fribourg	0–0 (a.e.t.) (3–5 p)	Vevey Sports
20 September 1997
YF Juventus	2–2 (a.e.t.) (4–3 p)	Biaschesi
Wangen bei Olten	1–3	Wil
Echallens	0–5	Delémont
Brugg	1–3 (a.e.t.)	Buochs
Chiasso	1–4	Lugano
Monthey	2–1	Yverdon-Sport
Muttenz	1–3	Red Star
Rapperswil-Jona	0–3	Winterthur
Tuggen	0–4	Locarno
SV Lyss	2–1	Serrières
Cham	0–4	Baden
21 September 1997
FC Marly	0–4	Young Boys

=== Matches ===
21 September 1997
15:00

FC Marly	0–4	Young Boys
	YB summary	29' (0:1) Fryand; 48' (0:2) Niederhäuser; 55' (0:3) Kehrli; 65' (0:4) Fryand

Stade de la Gérine
Attendance: 1,173
Referee: (Switzerland) Gilles Golay

== Round 5 ==
The first-tier clubs from the 1994–95 Nationalliga A were granted byes for the first four rounds, they joined the competition in this round. The first-tier teams were seeded and cound not be drawn against each other. The draw respected regionalities, when possible, and the lower classed team was granted home advantage.

=== Summary ===
Team 1	Score	Team 2
15 November 1997
Buochs	2–7 (a.e.t.)	Basel
Lugano	5–0	SV Schaffhausen
Red Star	0–6	Grasshopper Club
Winterthur	1–1 (a.e.t.) (7–6 p)	Luzern
Young Boys	1–4	Lausanne-Sport
Meyrin	3–1	SV Lyss
16 November 1997
YF Juventus	2–4	Wil
FC Schaffhausen	0–1	Zürich
Delémont	2–2 (a.e.t.) (3–4 p)	Sion
Bellinzona	1–3	St. Gallen
Stade Nyonnais	1–2	Xamax
Vevey Sports	0–4	Servette
Monthey	0–1	Thun
Solothurn	1–3	Étoile-Carouge
Locarno	1–4	Kriens
Baden	1–4	Aarau

=== Matches ===
15 November 1997
16:00

SC Buochs	2 – 7 (a.e.t.)	Basel
Cavallucci 22' (pen.); Meier (yellow card) 33'; Bieri 54' (2:1); Von Flüe (yellow card) 90'; Barmettler (yellow card) 119'	FCB summary	17' (0:1) Zuffi; (yellow card) 22' Nemtsoudis; (yellow card) 54' Henry; 86' (2:2) Subiat; 96' (2:3) Subiat; 101' (2:4) Subiat; 112' (2:5) Knup; 117' (2:6) Knup; 120+1' (2:7) Henry

Stadion Seefeld, Buochs
Attendance: 2,500
Referee: (Switzerland) René Rogalla (Wallisellen)

15 November 1997

Red Star	0–6	Grasshopper Club
	RSSSF summary	9' (0:1) Moldovan; 29' (0:2) Türkyilmaz; 36' (0:3) Kavelachvili; 64' (0:4) Türkyilmaz; 66' (0:5) Yakin; 76' (0:6) Yakin

Allmend Brunau, Zürich

15 November 1997

Young Boys	1–4	Lausanne-Sport
Moser 6' (1:0)	YB summary	32' (1:1) Thurre; 37' (o.g.) (Lengen); 45' (1:3) N'Kufo; 75' (1:4) N'Kufo

Wankdorf Stadium, Bern
Attendance: 4,400
Referee: (Switzerland) Massimo Busacca (Monte Carasso/Bellinzona)

16 November 1997

FC Schaffhausen	0–1 (a.e.t.)	Zürich
Gerstenmájer (yellow card) 15'; Stübi (yellow card) 42'; Ogg (yellow card) 50'; Pinelli (yellow card) 95'; Šlekys (red card) 113'; Galbarini (yellow card) 118'	FCZ summary	(yellow card) 31' Hodel; (yellow card) 86' Ferreri; 101' (0:1) Di Jorio; (yellow card) 116' Di Jorio

Stadion Breite, Schaffhausen
Attendance: 2,194
Referee: (Switzerland) Jürg Herrmann (Hinterkapplen (Wohlen bei Bern))

16 November 1997

Vevey Sports	0–4	Servette
	Servette summary	13' (0:1) Sesa; 27' (0:2) Varela; 68' (0:3) Sesa; 76' (0:4) Rey

Stade de Copet, Vevey

16 November 1997

Baden	1–4	Aarau
Casamento 24' (1:1)	FCA summary	5' (0:1) Drakopulos; 52' (1:2) Wiederkehr; 76' (1:3) Skrzypczak; 78' (1:4) de Napoli

Esp Stadium, Fislisbach
Attendance: 5,015
Referee: (Liechtenstein) Roland Beck (Triesenberg)

== Round 6 ==
=== Summary ===
Team 1	Score	Team 2
21 February 1998
Wil	0–0 (a.e.t.) (6–5 p)	Zürich
Sion	1–2 (a.e.t.)	St. Gallen
Xamax	2–0	Basel
22 February 1998
Lugano	1–0	Servette
Thun	2–1	Grasshopper Club
Winterthur	1–3	Lausanne-Sport
Étoile-Carouge	3–3 (a.e.t.) (3–0 p)	Kriens
1 April 1998
Meyrin	2–5	Aarau

=== Matches ===
21 February 1998

Wil	0–0 (a.e.t.)	Zürich
Fuchs (yellow card) 15'; Agnaldo (yellow card) 60'	FCZ summary	(yellow card) 6' Opango; (yellow card) 40' Sutter; (yellow card) 48' Fischer
Penalties
Besio (penalty scored); Winkler (penalty scored); Fuchs (penalty scored); Python (penalty missed); Paradiso (penalty scored); Soller (penalty scored); Steingruber (penalty scored)	6–5	(penalty scored) Fischer; (penalty scored) Hodel; (penalty missed) Iodice; (penalty scored) Baldassari; (penalty scored) Nonda; (penalty scored) Guzik; (penalty missed) Weiler

Stadion Bergholz, Wil
Attendance: 2,200
Referee: (Switzerland) Philippe Leuba (Chexbres)

21 February 1998
18:15

Xamax	2–0	Basel
Wittl (yellow card) 34'; Jeanneret (yellow card) 50'; Martinović 64'; Halili 71'; Hamann (yellow card) 76'	FCB summary	(yellow card) 15' Webber; (yellow card) 20' (yellow-red card) 45' Henry; (yellow card) 90+1' Gaudino

Stade de la Maladière (1924), Neuchâtel
Attendance: 3,900
Referee: (Switzerland) Massimo Busacca (Monte Carasso/Bellinzona)

22 February 1998

Lugano	1–0	Servette
Wegmann 32' (1:0)	Servette summary

Cornaredo, Lugano

22 February 1998

Thun	2–1	Grasshopper Club
Plevka 45' (pen.); Kurtulus 72' (2:1)	RSSSF summary	6' (0:1) Türkyilmaz

Stadion Lachen, Thun

1 April 1998

Meyrin	2–5	Aarau
Brunner 25' (1:1); Studer 90' (2:5)	FCA summary	16' (0:1) Zdrilic; 40' (1:2) Viceconte; 45' (1:3) Kilian; 45+1' (1:4) Viceconte; 48' (1:5) Roembiak

Stade des Arbères, Meyrin
Attendance: 850
Referee: (Switzerland) Markus Nobs (Wohlen bei Bern)

== Quarter-finals ==
=== Summary ===
Team 1	Score	Team 2
12 April 1998
Lugano	1–0	Aarau
13 April 1998
Wil	2–1	Étoile-Carouge
Lausanne-Sport	1–1 (a.e.t.) (4–1 p)	Xamax
Thun	0–5	St. Gallen

=== Matches ===
12 April 1998

Lugano	1–0	Aarau
Vivas 66' (1:0)	FCA summary

Cornaredo, Lugano
Attendance: 3,200
Referee: (Switzerland) Jürg Herrmann (Hinterkapplen (Wohlen bei Bern))

13 April 1998

Wil	2–1	Étoile-Carouge
Agnaldo 6' (1:0) (Morisod) 85' (o.g.)	RSSSF summary	33' (1:1) Hertig

Stadion Bergholz, Wil

13 April 1998

Lausanne-Sport	1–1 (a.e.t.)	Xamax
Celestini 49' (pen.)	RSSSF summary	53' (1:1) Martinovic
Penalties
Penalty scored	4–1	Penalty missed Penalty scored

Olympique de la Pontaise, Lausanne

13 April 1998

Thun	0–5	St. Gallen
	RSSSF summary	3' (0:1) Zwyssig; 32' (0:2) H. Yakin; 58' (0:3) Bühlmann; 71' (0:4) Bühlmann; 74' (0:5) Vidallé

Stadion Lachen, Thun

== Semi-finals ==
=== Summary ===
Team 1	Score	Team 2
5 May 1998
Wil	0–2	Lausanne-Sport
13 May 1998
St. Gallen	2–1	Lugano

=== Matches ===
5 May 1998

Wil	0–2	Lausanne-Sport
	RSSSF summary	62' (0:1) Verdanyan; 67' (0:2) N'Diaye

Stadion Bergholz, Wil
Attendance: 3,400
Referee: (Switzerland) Urs Meier (Würenlos)

13 May 1998

St. Gallen	2–1	Lugano
Vidallé 28' (1:0); H. Yakin 56' (2:0)	RSSSF summary	90+1' (2:1) Gimenez

Espenmoos, St. Gallen
Attendance: 11,200
Referee: (Switzerland) Dominique Tavel (Lonay)

== Final ==
=== Summary ===
Team 1	Score	Team 2
1 June 1998
Lausanne-Sport	2–2 (a.e.t.) (4–3 p)	St. Gallen

=== Telegram ===
1 June 1998
15:00

Lausanne-Sport	2–2 (a.e.t.)	St. Gallen
Rehn 58' (1:2); Thurre 89' (2:2)	Fussball-Schweiz summary	30' (0:1) Vurens; 48' (0:2) Vurens
Penalties
Celestini (penalty scored); Londono (penalty scored); Douglas (penalty scored); Puce (penalty scored)	4–3	(penalty scored) Hellinga; (penalty scored) Sène; (penalty scored) Fiechter; (penalty missed) Zwyssig; (penalty missed) Bühlmann

Wankdorf, Bern
Attendance: 25,000
Referee: (Switzerland) Andreas Schluchter (Schönenbuch)

Lausanne-Sport won the cup and this was the club's 8th cup title to this date.

== Further in Swiss football ==
- 1997–98 Nationalliga A
- 1997–98 Nationalliga B
- 1997–98 Swiss 1. Liga

== Sources and references ==
- RSSSF Page

Preceded by 1996–97	Seasons in Swiss Cup	Succeeded by 1998–99
