= 2001–02 Swiss Cup =

Tournament details
- Country: Switzerland
- Teams: 208

Final positions
- Champions: Basel
- Runners-up: Grasshopper Club

Tournament statistics
- Matches played: 207

The 2001–02 Swiss Cup was the 77th season of Switzerland's cup competition held annually by the Swiss Football Association (SFV-ASF). The competition began on 10 August with the first games of Round 1 and ended on 12 May 2002 with the Final held at St. Jakob-Park, Basel. The cup winners were qualified for the first round of the UEFA Cup.

== Overview ==
This season's cup competition began on the week-end 10, 11–12 August with the first round. The competition ended on Sunday 12 May 2002 with the final, which was held for the second time in the new St. Jakob-Park in Basel. The 48 clubs from the 2001–02 Swiss 1. Liga were granted byes for the first round and were to join the competition in the second round. The 12 clubs from the Nationalliga B were granted byes for the first three rounds. The 12 clubs from the Nationalliga A were granted byes for the first four rounds. The winners of the cup were to qualify for the first round of the first round of the UEFA Cup in the following season.

When possible, the draw respected regionalities and the lower classed team was granted home advantage. In the entire competition, the matches were played in a single knockout format. In the event of a draw after 90 minutes, the match went into extra time. In the event of a draw at the end of extra time, a penalty shoot-out was to decide which team qualified for the next round. No replays were foreseen in the entire competition.

== Round 1 ==
In the first round a total of 136 amateur clubs participated from the fourth-tier and lower. Reserve teams were not admitted to the competition, however the U-21 teams who played in the fourth-tier were qualified. The draw respected regionalities, when possible, and the lower classed team was granted home advantage.

Team 1	Score	Team 2
10 August 2001
FC Onex	4–3	US Terre-Sainte
FC Weesen	0–2	FC Landquart-Herrschaft
Gland	0–5	FC Epalinges
11 August 2001
FC Espagnol Lausanne	0–4	ES Malley
US Boncourt	0–3	Muttenz
FC Cudrefin	1–7	FC Valmont
Frauenfeld	1–3 (a.e.t.)	FC Widnau
FC Amriswil	1–2 (a.e.t.)	FC Wittenbach
FC Champagne-Sports	2–0	Serrières U-21
FC Visp	1–3	Martigny-Sports
FC Montlingen	1–3	FC Uzwil
Herisau	4–4 (a.e.t.) (9–7 p)	Winterthur U-21
FC Renens	4–0	Association des Portuguais Genève
Le Locle-Sports	0–8	FC La Tour/Le Pâquier
FC Sierre	2–0 (a.e.t.)	FC Salgesch
Köniz	3–2 (a.e.t.)	FC Langenthal
Bern	0–1	SV Lyss
Ibach	1–0	FC Sursee
FC Altdorf	1–0	FC Olten
FC Goldach	6–0	FC Wetzikon
Montreux-Sports	1–1 (a.e.t.) (6–5 p)	Xamax U-21
FC Deitingen	0–2	Nordstern Basel
FC Affoltern am Albis	5–0	Brugg
FC Winkeln (SG)	1–2	FC Beringen
Bex U-21	0–3	FC Stade Payerne
US Collombey-Muraz	3–1	FC Savièse
FC Tavannes	1–3	FC Alle
Laufen	2–1 (a.e.t.)	Herzogenbuchsee
Dornach	1–1 (a.e.t.) (7–6 p)	Old Boys
FC Marly	2–1	FC Schönbühl
FC Kirchbrg BE	2–1	FC Aarberg
Düdingen	1–3	Dürrenast
FC Kestenholz	0–7	Bümpliz
Kickers Luzern	3–2	FC Hochdorf
FC Brunnen	1–3 (a.e.t.)	FC Sarnen
SC Emmen	1–4	Team Aargau U21
FC Windisch	1–3	Zofingen
FC Buchs	1–6	FC Regensdorf
FC Bad Ragaz	2–6	FC Rüti
FC Glarus	1–3	Cham
FC Stabio	0–2	Lugano U-21
FC Thayngen	1–4	SC Veltheim
US Giubiasco	1–2	FC Ascona
FC Portalban/Gletterens	0–0 (a.e.t.) (3–4 p)	ASI Audax-Friul
FC Beinwil am See	0–4	Blue Stars
FC Siviriez	2–0	Echallens U-21
12 August 2001
FC Flums	0–1	FC St. Margrethen
FC Orsières	2–3 (a.e.t.)	FC Conthey
FC Deportivo	2–5 (a.e.t.)	FC Châtel-St-Denis
FC Polliez-Pittet	1–4	FC Marin-Sports
FC Signal	1–0	FC Dardania Lausanne
FC Donzelle	1–6	FC Lutry
FC Wülflingen	1–2	Brühl
Bazenheid	2–1	FC Bülach
Urania Genève Sport	1–1 (a.e.t.) (1–4 p)	FC Lancy-Sports
FC Belp	6–2	FC Grünstern (Ipsach)
FC Albisrieden	0–7	FC Muri
FC Wiedikon ZH	FF awd 3–0	FC Seefeld Zürich
FC Witikon	1—3	Inter Club Zurigo
FC Bottens	0–3	FC Lamboing
FC Reinach	1–2	Binningen
FC Einsielden	5–0	FC Lachen-Altendorf
FC Moutier	4–0	FC Bellach
FC Hinwil	0–2	FC Horgen
AC Vallemaggia	0–0 (a.e.t.) (8–7 p)	Biaschesi
FC Bodio	3–2	FC Küssnacht am Rigi
FC Heimberg	1–2	FC Ostermundingen
FC Brüttisellen	0–6	FC Kilchberg-Rüschlikon

- ^1Note to match Wiedikon–Seefeld: Seefeld forfeited and the match was awarded as 3–0 victory for Wiedikon.

== Round 2 ==
The 54 teams, including the U-21 teams, from the 2001–02 1. Liga that had been granted byes for the first round, joined the competition in this the second round. These teams were seeded and cound not be drawn against each other. The draw respected regionalities, when possible, and the lower classed team was granted the home advantage.

Team 1	Score	Team 2
24 August 2001
FC Alle	2–4	Dürrenast
Nordstern Basel	1–3	Fribourg
FC Lamboing	2–3	Baulmes
25 August 2001
FC Horgen	2–3	FC Rorschach
FC Ascona	2–0	Buochs
Binningen	0–2	SV Lyss
Moutier	1–2	Biel-Bienne
Köniz	4–2	Naters
FC Kirchberg	2–3 (a.e.t.)	Wangen bei Olten
Dornach	2–3	FC Ostermundigen
FC Beringen	1–0	Kreuzlingen
FC Champagne-Sports	3–5	Vevey Sports
Laufen	1–5	Basel U-21
Herisau	2–1	SV Schaffhausen
FC Renens	2–2 (a.e.t.) (4–2 p)	Stade Nyonnais
FC Valmont	1–2	Colombier
FC Lancy-Sports	1–6	Meyrin
FC La Tour/Le Pâquier	0–4	Bex
FC Widnau	1–1 (a.e.t.) (1–4 p)	FC Schaffhausen
Bazenheid	1–5	YF Juventus
Bümpliz	0–3	Münsingen
FC Goldach	2–1	SC Veltheim (Winterthur)
FC Uzwil	1–2	Gossau
Martigny-Sports	4–1	FC Onex
FC Stade Payerne	0–0 (a.e.t.) (5–4 p)	Serrières
Montreux-Sports	1–6	Grand-Lancy
FC Affoltern am Albis	1–2	Inter Club Zurigo
FC Einsielden	0–3	Schötz
FC Sarnen	2–1	Zug 94
Kickers Luzern	3–5	Luzern U-21
Brühl	3–1	FC Regensdorf
FC Kilchberg-Rüschlikon	2–3	St. Gallen U-21
FC Lutry	1–4	Servette U-21
Cham	1–2	Freienbach
US Collombey-Muraz	4–3	Lausanne-Sport U-21
FC Muri	2–4	FC Wittenbach
FC Sierre	2–1	Stade Lausanne Ouchy
FC Landquart-Herrschaft	0–1 (a.e.t.)	Tuggen
FC Rüti	0–3	Chur
FC Siviriez	2–1 (a.e.t.)	FC Marly
26 August 2001
FC Belp	0–5	Grenchen
FC Wiedikon ZH	0–2	Zürich U-21
FC Marin-Sports	0–6	Echallens
FC Epalinges	3–4	Chênois
Ibach	1–2	Wohlen
Lugano U-21	1–4	FC Malcantone Agno
ASI Audax-Friul	1–0	La Chaux-de-Fonds
Muttenz	1–5	Solothurn
FC St. Margrethen	6–4 (a.e.t.)	Rapperswil-Jona
Zofingen	2–2 (a.e.t.) (6–5 p)	FC Altstetten (Zürich)
Signal FC (Bernex)	0–1	Sion U-21
Team Aargau U-21	5–1	FC Schwamendingen (ZH)
Blue Stars	0–1	Red Star
FC Altdorf	0–5	Grasshopper Club U-21
FC Conthey	1–4	ES Malley
FC Châtel-St-Denis	1–3	Bulle
AC Vallemaggia	2–3	Mendrisio
FC Bodio	1–2	Chiasso

== Round 3 ==
Team 1	Score	Team 2
14 September 2001
Red Star	0–1	Grasshopper Club U-21
ES Malley	1–2 (a.e.t.)	Baulmes
Fribourg	0–1	Bulle
Mendrisio	0–3	Chiasso
FC Siviriez	0–7	Servette U-21
15 September 2001
Dürrenast	3–2	FC Ostermundigen
YF Juventus	2–1	Gossau
Inter Club Zurigo	2–3	Zürich U-21
Herisau	2–0	Freienbach
FC Renens	1–0	US Collombey-Muraz
Echallens	4–1	Chênois
Wohlen	1–0 (a.e.t.)	Malcantone Agno
FC Wittenbach	3–1	FC Beringen
FC Goldach	2–0	Brühl
FC Sierre	0–4	Bex
Martigny-Sports	2–3	FC Stade Payerne
Grand-Lancy	1–2	Vevey Sports
Grenchen	0–2	Basel U-21
ASI Audax-Friul	0–3	Colombier
FC Ascona	3–1	Solothurn
Tuggen	2–1	St. Gallen U-21
FC St. Margrethen	2–0	FC Rorschach
FC Schaffhausen	4–0	Chur
Köniz	1–2	SV Lyss
FC Sarnen	1–2	Luzern U-21
Zofingen	0–1	Wangen bei Olten
Meyrin	3–0	Sion U-21
Team Aargau U-21	1–3 (a.e.t.)	Schötz
Münsingen	1–3	Biel-Bienne

== Round 4 ==
The twelve teams from the 2001–02 Nationalliga B (NLB) were granted byes for the first three rounds and they joined the competition in the fourth round. These teams were seeded and cound not be drawn against each other. The draw respected regionalities, when possible, and the lower classed team was granted home advantage.

=== Summary ===
Team 1	Score	Team 2
5 October 2001
Luzern U-21	0–4	Baden
6 October 2001
YF Juventus	3–0	Locarno
Grasshopper Club U-21	1–3	Wil
Herisau	0–1	FC Schaffhausen
FC Goldach	2–2 (a.e.t.) (0–3 p)	FC Wittenbach
7 October 2001
Bulle	2–2 (a.e.t.)	Wangen bei Olten
Schötz	2–1	Winterthur
Wohlen	2–1 (a.e.t.)	Zürich U-21
Bex	2–3	Concordia Basel
Dürrenast	3–1	SV Lyss
Meyrin	3–5	Delémont
Servette U-21	3–2	Baulmes
FC Stade Payerne	1–3	Vevey Sports
FC Renens	2–4 (a.e.t.)	Biel-Bienne
Basel U-21	2–3	Thun
Tuggen	2–6	Kriens
Chiasso	0–2	Bellinzona
Echallens	0–4	Yverdon-Sport
17 October 2001
Colombier	1–0	Étoile-Carouge
20 October 2001
FC Ascona	3–1	FC St. Margrethen

=== Matches ===
5 October 2001

Luzern U-21	0–4	Baden
	RSSSF summary	29' (0:1) S. Balmer; 46' (0:2) Menezes; 90+2' (0:3) Vogt; 90+3' (0:4) Vogt

Stadion Allmend, Luzern

== Round 5 ==
The twelve first-tier clubs from the 2001–02 Nationalliga A had been granted byes for the first four rounds and they joined the competition in this round. The first-tier teams were seeded and cound not be drawn against each other. The draw respected regionalities, when possible, and the lower classed team was granted home advantage.

=== Summary ===
Team 1	Score	Team 2
10 November 2001
YF Juventus	1–2	Luzern
Wangen bei Olten	2–3 awd 3–0	Servette
FC Wittenbach	1–4	Grasshopper Club
Schötz	0–3	Zürich
Wohlen	0–3	FC Schaffhausen
Concordia Basel	0–5	Basel
11 November 2001
Dürrenast	1–4	Delémont
Servette U-21	0–3	Lausanne-Sport
Vevey Sports	0–1	Young Boys
Biel-Bienne	0–2 (a.e.t.)	Thun
Kriens	0–2	Lugano
Wil	3–2	St. Gallen
Bellinzona	3–0	Baden
Colombier	2–2 (a.e.t.) (4–2 p)	Xamax
Yverdon-Sport	0–0 (a.e.t.) (5–3 p)	Sion
21 November 2001
FC Ascona	0–2	Aarau

- ^2Note to match Wangen bei Olten–Servette: The result was annulled and awarded as 3–0 victory for Wangen bei Olten. The player Goran Obradovic of Servette played although he was suspended.

=== Matches ===
10 November 2001

Wangen bei Olten	2–3	Servette
Tannhäuser 12' (1:0); Nascimento 58' (2:1)	Servette summary	17' (1:1) Robert; 63' (2:2) Robert; 90' (2:3) Obradovic

Sportplatz Chrüzmatt, Wangen bei Olten
- ^3Note: The Servette victory was subsequently overruled and converted to a 3–0 victory for Wangen. Servette were disqualified for fielding the ineligible Obradovic.

10 November 2001
16:00

FC Wittenbach	1–4	Grasshopper Club
Gossolt 7' (1:1)	RSSSF summary GC summary (archive)	4' (0:1) Chapuisat; 19' (pen.) Nuñez; 64' (1:3) Baturina; 90+1' (1:4) Nuñez

Sportanlage Grüntal, Wittenbach
Attendance: 3,500 (sold-out)
Referee: (Switzerland) Massimo Busacca (Monte Carasso/Bellinzona)
- FC Wittenbach played the 2001/02 season in the 2. Liga interregional (fourth-tier) following their promotion in the previous season.

10 November 2001
16:00

Schötz	0–3	Zürich
	FCZ summary	44' (0:1) Kavelachvili; 63' (0:2) Guerrero; 78' (pen.) Guerrero

Sportplatz Wissenhusen, Kilchmatte, Schötz
Attendance: 2,000
Referee: (Switzerland) Carlo Bertolini (Vira-Gambarogno)

10 November 2001
19:30

Concordia	0–5	Basel
Ribeiro (yellow card) 45'	FCB summary	(yellow card) 25' Quennoz; 27' (0:1) Barberis; 41' (0:2) Koumantarakis; 59' (0:3) Giménez; 75' (0:4) Tum; 90+1' (0:5) Tum

St. Jakob-Park, Basel
Attendance: 5,431
Referee: (Switzerland) Claudio Circhetta (Muttenz)

11 November 2001
14:30

Vevey Sports	0–1	Young Boys
Becirovic (red card) 32'	YB summary	21' (0:1) Malacarne; (red card) 32' Petrosyan; (yellow card) 35' Coubageat

Stade de Copet, Vevey
Attendance: 800
Referee: (Switzerland) Martin Salm (Veltheim, Aargau)

21 November 2001
20:00

FC Ascona	0–2	Aarau
	FCA summary	21' (0:1) Gygax; 90' (0:2) Okpala

Stadio Comunale Ascona
Attendance: 600
Referee: (Switzerland) Nicole Petignat (Courgenay)
- FC Ascona played the 2001/02 season in the 2. Liga interregional (fourth-tier)

== Round 6 ==
=== Summary ===
Team 1	Score	Team 2
16 February 2002
Wangen bei Olten	3–2	Delémont
17 February 2002
Colombier	0–1	Basel
FC Schaffhausen	0–3 (a.e.t.)	Zürich
Luzern	1–0 (a.e.t.)	Aarau
Bellinzona	1–2	Young Boys
Wil	3–2	Lugano
Thun	2–4 (a.e.t.)	Lausanne-Sport
Yverdon-Sport	0–1	Grasshopper Club

=== Matches ===
17 February 2002
14:30

Colombier	0–1	Basel
	FCB summary	(yellow card) 53' H. Yakin; 56' (0:1) Giménez; (yellow card) 59' Giménez

Stade des Chézards, Colombier, Switzerland
Attendance: 3,000
Referee: (Switzerland) Florian Etter

17 February 2002
14:30

FC Schaffhausen	0–3 (a.e.t.)	Zürich
Rohrer (yellow card) 11'; Toco (yellow card) 23'; Fehr (yellow card) 62' (yellow-red card) 86'; Colantonio (yellow card) 108'	FCZ summary	(yellow card) 27' Magro; (red card) 63' Iodice; (yellow card) 107' Keller; 100' (0:1) Hellinga; 115' (0:2) Hellinga; 117' (0:3) Guerrero

Stadion Breite, Schaffhausen
Attendance: 2,050
Referee: (Switzerland) Martin Salm (Veltheim, Aargau)

17 February 2002

Luzern	1–0 (a.e.t.)	Aarau
Varela 120' (1:0)	FCA summary

Stadion Allmend, Luzern
Attendance: 4,001
Referee: (Switzerland) Massimo Busacca (Monte Carasso/Bellinzona)

17 February 2002

Bellinzona	1–2	Young Boys
Ojeda 74' (pen.)	YB summary	45' (0:1) Vardanyan; 88' (1:2) Patrick

Stadio Comunale, Bellinzona
Attendance: 1,500
Referee: (Switzerland) Roland Beck (Triesenberg)

17 February 2002

Yverdon-Sport	0–1	Grasshopper Club
	RSSSF summary	65' (0:1) Eduardo Ribeiro

Stade Municipal, Yverdon-les-Bains

== Quarter-finals ==
=== Summary ===
Team 1	Score	Team 2
21 March 2002
Luzern	0–0 (a.e.t.) (3–4 p)	Grasshopper Club
Wangen bei Olten	2–6 (a.e.t.)	Young Boys
Wil	1–1 (a.e.t.) (9–10 p)	Lausanne-Sport
Zürich	1–4	Basel

=== Matches ===
21 March 2002
19:30

Luzern	0–0 (a.e.t.)	Grasshopper Club
	RSSSF summary
Penalties
Nascimento (penalty scored); Greco (penalty scored); D.Andreoli (penalty scored); Kottmann (penalty missed); Arrué (penalty missed)	3–4	(penalty scored) Cabanas; (penalty scored) Petric; (penalty scored) Baturina; (penalty scored) Nuñez; (penalty missed) Eduardo Ribeiro

Stadion Allmend, Luzern

21 March 2002
19:30

Wangen bei Olten	2–6 (a.e.t.)	Young Boys
Knezevic (yellow card) 22'; Music 32' (1:1); Heiniger 49' (2:2); Osaj (yellow card) 60'; Cardoso (yellow card) 92'; Killian (yellow card) 114'	YB summary	5' (0:1) Häberli; 41' (pen 1:2) Sermeter; (yellow card) 54' Häberli; (yellow card) 66' Eugster; (yellow card) 79' Burri; (yellow card) 80' Malacarne; 91' (2:3) Sermeter; (yellow card) 98' Patrick; 105' (2:4) Malacarne; 113' (2:5) Vonlanthen; 120' (pen 2:6) Tikva

Sportplatz Chrüzmatt, Wangen bei Olten
Attendance: 2,310
Referee: (Switzerland) Nicole Petignat (Courgenay)

21 March 2002
19:30

Wil	1–1 (a.e.t.)	Lausanne-Sport
Hasler 86' (1:1)	RSSSF summary	71' (0:1) Leandro; (yellow card) 90' (yellow-red card) 113' Iglesias
Penalties
Isabella (penalty scored); Balmer (penalty scored); Pavlovic (penalty missed); Hasler (penalty scored); Romano (penalty scored); Lustrinelli (penalty scored); Fabinho (penalty scored); Naldo (penalty scored); Mordeku (penalty scored); Satilmis (penalty scored); Rapo (penalty missed)	9–10	(penalty missed) Simon; (penalty scored) Wittl; (penalty scored) Contini; (penalty scored) Zambaz; (penalty scored) Meyer; (penalty scored) Karlen; (penalty scored) Shizo; (penalty scored) Teixeira; (penalty scored) Yoksuzoglu; (penalty scored) Zetzmann; (penalty scored) Meyer

Stadion Bergholz, Wil
Attendance: 1,700
Referee: (Switzerland) Martin Salm (Veltheim, Aargau)

21 March 2002
19:30

Zürich	1–4	Basel
Akalé 24' (1:1); Iodice (yellow card) 45'; Chassot (yellow card) 47'; Akalé (yellow card) 36' (yellow-red card) 88'	FCB summary	17' (0:1) Koumantarakis; (yellow card) 24' Koumantarakis; 44' (1:2) Ergić; 84' (1:3) Varela; 87' (1:4) Chipperfield

Letzigrund, Zürich
Attendance: 6,800
Referee: (Switzerland) Guido Wildhaber (Kerzers)

== Semi-finals ==
=== Summary ===
Team 1	Score	Team 2
11 April 2002
Basel	1–1 (a.e.t.) (4–3 p)	Young Boys
Lausanne-Sport	1–4	Grasshopper Club

=== Matches ===
11 April 2002
20:15

Basel	1–1 (a.e.t.)	Young Boys
Varela (yellow card) 13'; M. Yakin (penalty missed) 16′ Giménez 23' (1:0); Yao (yellow card) 58'; Cravero (red card) 69'; Atouba (yellow card) 90'; Koumantarakis (yellow card) 114'	FCB summary	(yellow card) 16' Rochat; (penalty missed) 30′ Sermeter; 51' (1:1) Descloux; (red card) 73' Collaviti; (yellow card) 77' Tikva
Penalties
M. Yakin (penalty scored); Zwyssig (penalty scored); Giménez (penalty scored); Koumantarakis (penalty missed); Zuberbühler (penalty missed); Chipperfield (penalty scored)	4–3	(penalty scored) Hänzi; (penalty missed) Tikva; (penalty scored) Descloux; (penalty missed) Petrosyan; (penalty scored) Burri; (penalty missed) Berisha

St. Jakob-Park, Basel
Attendance: 25,381
Referee: (Switzerland) Massimo Busacca (Monte Carasso/Bellinzona)

11 April 2002
20:15

Lausanne-Sport	1–4	Grasshopper Club
Meyer 51' (pen 1:2)	RSSSF summary	6' (0:1) Petric; 22' (pen 0:2) Nuñez; 87' (1:3) Baturina; 90' (1:4) Eduardo Ribeiro

Olympique de la Pontaise, Lausanne
Attendance: 2,880
Referee: (Switzerland) Roland Beck (Triesenberg)

== Final ==
The winners of the first drawn semi-final was considered as home team in the final.

=== Summary ===
Team 1	Score	Team 2
12 May 2002
Grasshopper Club	1–2 (a.e.t.)	Basel

=== Telegram ===
12 May 2002
16:00

Grasshopper Club	1–2 (a.e.t.)	Basel
Petrić 38'; Schwegler (yellow card) 28'; Castillo (yellow card) 78'; Cabanas (yellow card) 82'; Petrić (yellow card) 91'; Smiljanić (yellow card) 42' (yellow-red card) 112'	Fussball-Schweiz summary FCB summary	5' Tum; (yellow card) 43' M. Yakin; (yellow card) 114' Barberis; 113' (pen.) M. Yakin

St. Jakob-Park, Basel
Attendance: 30,000 (sold-out)
Referee: (Switzerland) Philippe Leuba

Basel won the cup and this was the club's sixth cup title to this date. Five days earlier the team had also become league champions and this was the second time in the club's history that they had secured the double. Since Basel won the championship and qualified for the 2002–03 UEFA Champions League, Grasshoppers qualified for the first round of the UEFA Cup.

== Further in Swiss football ==
- 2001-02 Nationalliga A
- 2001-02 Nationalliga B
- 2001-02 Swiss 1. Liga
