= 1998–99 Swiss Cup =

Tournament details
- Country: Switzerland
- Teams: 192

Final positions
- Champions: Lausanne-Sport
- Runners-up: Grasshopper Club

Tournament statistics
- Matches played: 191

The 1998–99 Swiss Cup was the 74th season of Switzerland's football cup competition organised annually by the Swiss Football Association. The competition began on 4 August with the first game of the first round and ended on 13 June 1999 with the final held at the former Wankdorf in Bern. The winners earned a place in the first round of the UEFA Cup.

== Overview ==
The competition began on 4 August with the first two games of the first round, but the majority of the matches were played during the week-end of 8–9 August. the competition ended on Sunday 13 June 1999 with the final held at the former Wankdorf Stadium in Bern. This year saw some modifications in the early rounds. The 54 clubs from the 1998–99 1. Liga were granted byes for the first round and were to join the competition in the second round. The 12 clubs from the Nationalliga B were granted byes for the first three rounds. The 12 clubs from the Nationalliga A were granted byes for the first four rounds. The winners of the cup qualified themselves for the first round of the first round of the UEFA Cup in the following season.

When possible, the draw respected regionalities and the lower classed team was granted home advantage. In the entire competition, the matches were played in a single knockout format. In the event of a draw after 90 minutes, the match went into extra time. In the event of a draw at the end of extra time, a penalty shoot-out was to decide which team qualified for the next round. No replays were foreseen in the entire competition.

== Round 1 ==
In the first round a total of 114 amateur clubs participated from the fourth-tier and lower. Reserve teams were not admitted to the competition. The draw respected regionalities, when possible, and the lower classed team was granted home advantage.

Team 1	Score	Team 2
4 August 1998
SC Veltheim (Winterthur)	4–0	Herisau
Ballspiel Club Zürich	– *	FC Spreitenbach
5 August 1998
FC Caslano	0–2	Malcantone Agno
FC Montlingen	0–3	FC Flurlingen
6 August 1998
FC Neumünster	– *	FC Kilchberg-Rüschlikon
7 August 1998
FC Suhrr	5–0	FC Olten
FC Termen/Ried-Brig	0–1	FC Salgesch
FC Courrendlin	2–2 (a.e.t.) (1–4 p)	US Boncourt
8 August 1998
ES Malley	4–3 (a.e.t.)	FC Collex-Bossy
FC Konolfingen	3–0	Düdingen
FC Cortaillod	2–1	FC La Sarraz-Eclépens
FC Roche	1–3	FC Lutry
FC Porrentruy	4–2	Old Boys
CS La Tour-de-Peilz	1–6	FC Châtel-Saint-Denis
FC Lamboing	0–2	FC Kerzers
FC Perly-Certoux	1–1 (a.e.t.) (4–3 p)	US Terre-Sainte
ES Belfaux	1–1 (a.e.t.) (4–2 p)	SC Worb
FC Länggasse (Bern)	0–1	FC Allmendingen Thun
Lengnau	2–3	FC Liestal
FC Malters	– *	Kickers Luzern
FC Nottwil	– *	FC Kölliken
SC Cham	1–1 (a.e.t.) (4–3 p)	FC Einsiedeln
FC Wetzikon	– *	FC Lachen/Altendorf
FC Ruswil	1–2	FC Langenthal
FC Dagmersellen	– *	Schöftland
FC Kirchberg (SG)	– *	FC Uzwil
FC Küssnacht am Rigi	– *	Gossau
FC Töss (Winterthur)	– *	FC Fortuna (SG)
SC Binningen	3–3 (a.e.t.) (2–4 p)	FC Gunzwil
Wettingen	– *	FC Affoltern am Albi
FC Bodio	2–2	FC Tresa/Monteggio
9 August 1998
AS Italiana (Bern)	0–3	FC Lerchenfeld (Thun)
Portugais Grottes (GE)	0–4	Signal FC (Bernex)
FC Bramois	1–1 (a.e.t.) (4–3 p)	FC Sierre
FC Conthey	2–5	FC Savièse
Laufen	3–2 (a.e.t.)	FC Courtetelle
SC Aegerten-Brügg	5–3 (a.e.t.)	FC Grünstern (Ipsach)
FC Au-Heerbrugg	1–2	FC Goldach
SC Fulenbach	1–2	FC Klus-Balstahl
FC Oetwil am See	– *	FC Turgi
FC Adliswil	– *	FC Seefeld Zürich
Kosova Schlieren	– *	Blue Stars
Baulmes	2–1	ASI Audax-Friul (Neuchâtel)
Nordstern Basel	0–5	Black Stars
Zofingen	1–2	FC Subingen
FC Dottikon	3–0	FC Welschenrohr
FC Epalinges	2–0	CS Romontois
FC Bavois	0–2	FC Le Locle
SC Goldau	2–3 (a.e.t.)	Mendrisio
FC Reinach (BL)	2–6 (a.e.t.)	FC Aesch
FC Schmerikon	– *	FC Dübendorf
FC Saint-Paul (Vésenaz)	3–0	FC Crissier
FC Grabs	2–1	FC Flawil
FC Bazenheid	– *	FC Uznach
FC Walenstadt	– *	SC Steinhausen
US Schluein	5–3	CB Vella
11 August 1998
FC Wädenswil	– *	FC Stäfa

- A number of scores remain unknown.

== Round 2 ==
The 54 teams from the 1998–99 1. Liga, that had been granted byes for the first round, joined the competition in this the second round. They were seeded and cound not be drawn against each other. The draw respected regionalities, when possible, and the lower classed team was granted the home advantage.

Team 1	Score	Team 2
21 August 1998
FC Cortaillod	0–2	Echallens
FC Saint-Paul (Vésenaz)	1–0	Gland
FC Perly-Certoux	1–3	Meyrin
22 August 1998
FC Le Locle	2–2 (a.e.t.) (8–9 p)	FC Renens
FC Kerzers	1–3	Colombier
FC Porrentruy	1–2	La Chaux-de-Fonds
FC Savièse	1–5	Martigny-Sports
Baulmes	2–0	Le Mont-sur-Lausanne
ES Belfaux	2–0	Bümpliz
FC Châtel-St-Denis	2–1 (a.e.t.)	Vevey Sports
FC Langenthal	1–2	Biel-Bienne
ES Malley	1–4	Chênois
US Boncourt	1–3	Concordia Basel
FC Lutry	0–3	Bex
23 August 1998
Laufen	0–5	Serrières
FC Bramois	0–4	Monthey
Signal FC (Bernex)	2–2 (a.e.t.) (4–1 p)	Grand-Lancy
FC Allmendingen (Thun)	1–1 (a.e.t.) (3–4 p)	Fribourg
FC Lerchenfeld (Thun)	0–5	Bulle
22–23 August 1998
FC Kilchberg-Rüschlikon	0–4	Red Star
FC Seefeld Zürich	2–3 (a.e.t.)	Wohlen
Malcantone Agno	3–1	Biaschesi
Cham	1–3	Rapperswil-Jona
FC Lachen/Altendorf	0–5	Buochs
FC Bazenheid	0–2 (a.e.t.)	Kreuzlingen
FC Dagmersellen	1–4	Wangen bei Olten
FC Grabs	0–2	Frauenfeld
FC Goldach	1–4 (a.e.t.)	Gossau
FC Kölliken	0–6	FC Sursee
FC Konolfingen	3–2	Köniz
FC Küssnacht am Rigi	5–2	Bülach
FC Schmerikon	5–2	Freienbach
FC Subingen	4–3	Dornach
FC Spreitenbach	1–1 (a.e.t.) (5–4 p)	FC Altstetten (Zürich)
FC Suhr	1–3	Grenchen
FC Walenstadt	0–8	Tuggen
FC Aesch	2–1	SV Lyss
FC Dottikon	1–7	Schötz
Wettingen	3–1	FC Schwamendingen
FC Turgi	0–3	FC Muri
FC Liestal	2–4 (a.e.t.)	Muttenz
FC Aegerten-Brügg	2–3	FC Marly
Black Stars	4–1 (a.e.t.)	FC Alle
Blue Stars	2–1	YF Juventus
FC Flurlingen	0–8	Winterthur
Kickers Luzern	1–1 (a.e.t.) (3–1 p)	Hochdorf
FC Klus-Balstahl	0–3	FC Riehen
FC Schluein	1–6	FC Rorschach
FC Fortuna (SG)	0–2	SV Schaffhausen
FC Epalinges	0–8	Stade Lausanne
FC Gunzwil	0–3	Münsingen
FC Salgesch	1–5	Naters
FC Uzwil	1–1 (a.e.t.) (2–4 p)	SC Veltheim (Winterthur)
FC Wädenswil	0–1	Zug 94
Mendrisio	0–4	Bellinzona
FC Tresa/Monteggio	1–3	FC Ascona

== Round 3 ==
Team 1	Score	Team 2
8 September 1998
FC Spreitenbach	2–0	Wohlen
11 September 1998
ES Belfaux	1–3	Colombier
12–13 September 1998
Baulmes	1–3	Chênois
FC Saint-Paul (Vésenaz)	1–4	FC Renens
Bex	1–2 (a.e.t.)	Signal FC (Bernex)
Naters	1–0	Martigny-Sports
Meyrin	4–1	Echallens
Stade Lausanne	2–2 (a.e.t.) (2–3 p)	Monthey
Biel-Bienne	0–1	La Chaux-de-Fonds
FC Marly	1–2 (a.e.t.)	Münsingen
FC Konolfingen	2–5	Fribourg
FC Subingen	1–4	Wangen bei Olten
Grenchen	3–1	Serrières
Black Stars	2–1	FC Ascona
Schötz	5–1	Malcantone Agno
FC Aesch	0–4	Bellinzona
Zug 94	1–2	FC Küssnacht am Rigi
FC Sursee	0–1	Buochs
Kickers Luzern	5–3	Concordia Basel
SV Schaffhausen	0–4	Red Star
FC Muri	0–1	Gossau
Winterthur	3–0	Tuggen
Blue Stars	2–4	SC Veltheim (Winterthur)
Wettingen	2–2 (a.e.t.) (2–4 p)	FC Rorschach
Kreuzlingen	1–3	Rapperswil-Jona
FC Schmerikon	0–2	Frauenfeld
FC Riehen	1–0	Muttenz
30 September 1998
FC Châtel-St-Denis	3–1	Bulle

== Round 4 ==
Team 1	Score	Team 2
9–11 November 1998
FC Signal	1–5	Stade Nyonnais
FC Bulle	3–1 (a.e.t.)	CS Chênois
FC Meyrin	0–4	Yverdon-Sport FC
FC Renens	0–2	Étoile-Carouge FC
FC Monthey	1–3	FC Naters
FC Black Stars Basel	1–2 (a.e.t.)	FC Grenchen
FC Colombier	1–2	FC Thun
FC La Chaux-de-Fonds	1–1 (a.e.t.) (p. 7–8)	FC Wangen bei Olten
FC Fribourg	0–1	SR Delémont
FC Münsingen	1–3	FC Solothurn
FC Kickers Luzern	2–2 (a.e.t.) (p. 4–5)	FC Chiasso
FC Schötz	0–1	FC Locarno
FC Spreitenbach	0–3	AC Bellinzona
FC Riehen	2–5	SC Buochs
FC Küssnacht a/R	2–4	SC Kriens
FC Winterthur	5–1	FC Rapperswil-Jona
FC Frauenfeld	0–1	FC Schaffhausen
SC Veltheim	1–3 (a.e.t.)	FC Gossau
FC Red Star Zürich	4–3 (a.e.t.)	FC Baden
FC Rorschach	1–3	FC Wil

== Round 5 ==
The 12 first-tier clubs from the 1998–99 Nationalliga A had been granted byes for the first four rounds and they joined the competition in this round. The first-tier teams were seeded and cound not be drawn against each other. The draw respected regionalities, when possible, and the lower classed team was granted home advantage.

=== Summary ===
Team 1	Score	Team 2
20 February 1999
Locarno	0–0 (a.e.t.) (3–5 p)	Zürich
21 February 1999
Yverdon-Sport	3–1	Young Boys
Gossau	0–2 *	Lugano
Stade Nyonnais	2–2 (a.e.t.) (4–2 p)	Basel
17 March 1999
Bulle	1–5	Lausanne-Sport
Delémont	1–0	Xamax
Naters	1–3	Servette
Winterthur	1–2	Grasshopper Club
Buochs	1–0 (a.e.t.)	St. Gallen
Grenchen	2–0	Étoile-Carouge
18 March 1999
Solothurn	0–1	FC Sion
Wil	3–0	Aarau
24 March 1999
FC Schaffhausen	0–1 (a.e.t.)	Luzern
Red Star	3–0	Chiasso
Wangen bei Olten	2–5 (a.e.t.)	Thun
Bellinzona	3–0	Kriens

- Note the match Gossau–Lugano was played in Lugano.

=== Matches ===
20 February 1999

Locarno	0–0 (a.e.t.)	Zürich
De Lusi (yellow card) 21'; Pido (yellow card) 56'	FCZ summary	(yellow card) 26' Tarone; (yellow card) 55' Del Signore; (yellow card) 104' Iodice; (yellow card) 109' Sant'Anna; (yellow card) 116' Bartlett
Penalties
Schreier (penalty missed); Brcic (penalty scored); Woxlin (penalty scored); Gentizon (penalty scored)	3–5	(penalty scored) Fischer; (penalty scored) Del Signore; (penalty scored) Tarone; (penalty scored) Iodice; (penalty scored) Bartlett

Stadio del Lido, Locarno
Attendance: 1,200
Referee: (Liechtenstein) Roland Beck (Triesenberg)

21 February 1999

Yverdon-Sport	3–1	Young Boys
Leandro 40' (1:0); Bencivenga 67' (2:0); Jenny 90+1' (3:1)	YB summary	92' (pen.) Lengen

Stade Municipal, Yverdon-les-Bains
Attendance: 800
Referee: (Switzerland) Carlo Bertolini (Vira-Gambarogno)

21 February 1999
14:30

Stade Nyonnais	2–2 (a.e.t.)	Basel
Oliveira (yellow card) 10'; Margarini (yellow card) 37'; Ceccaroni 44' (o.g.); Aubert 52'; Bridy (yellow card) 62'	Summary	22' (o.g.) Poulard; (yellow card) 34' Ceccaroni; 67' Frick
Penalties
Vernaz (penalty scored); Carrasco (penalty missed); Ostermann (penalty scored); Martin (penalty scored); De Siebenthal (penalty scored)	4–2	(penalty missed) Frick; (penalty scored) Cravero; (penalty scored) Kreuzer; (penalty missed) Sahin

Colovray, Nyon
Attendance: 622
Referee: (Switzerland) Marcel Vollenweider (Rüti, Zürich)

17 March 1999

Naters	1–3	Servette
Jenelten 32' (1:2)	Servette summary	10' (pen.) Rey; 23' (0:2) Rey; 84' (1:3) Lonfat

Sportanlage Stapfen, Naters

17 March 1999

Winterthur	1–2	Grasshopper Club
Gerstenmájer 40' (pen.)	RSSSF summary	30' (1:0) Magnin; 45' (2:1) Magnin

Schützenwiese, Winterthur

18 March 1999

Wil	3–0	Aarau
Fabinho; Amoah 90' (2:0); Amoah 90+2' (3:0)	FCA summary

Stadion Bergholz, Wil
Attendance: 1,250
Referee: (Switzerland) Markus Nobs (Wohlen bei Bern)

== Round 6 ==
=== Summary ===
Team 1	Score	Team 2
13 April 1999
Stade Nyonnais	1–1 (a.e.t.) (2–4 p)	Grasshopper Club
Wil	1–4	Lausanne-Sport
14 April 1999
Buochs	0–1	Servette
Grenchen	0–2	Sion
Thun	1–3	Delémont
Bellinzona	2–3	Luzern
Zürich	0–1	Lugano
15 April 1999
Red Star	2–1	Yverdon-Sport

=== Matches ===
13 April 1999

Stade Nyonnais	1–1 (a.e.t.)	Grasshopper Club
Vernaz 54' (1:1)	RSSSF summary	3' (0:1) Haas
Penalties
Penalty scored Penalty missed	2–4	Penalty scored

Stade de Colovray, Nyon

14 April 1999

Buochs	0–1	Servette
	Servette summary	50' (0:1) Vurens

Stadion Seefeld, Buochs

14 April 1999

Thun	1–3	Delémont
Plevka 62' (1:2)	RSSSF summary	12' (0:1) Ndlovu; 31' (0:2) Ndlovu; 66' (1:3) Jinani

Stadion Lachen, Thun
Attendance: 772
Referee: (Switzerland) Massimo Busacca (Monte Carasso/Bellinzona)

14 April 1999

Zürich	0–1	Lugano
Jamarauli (yellow card) 15'	FCZ summary	(yellow card) 40' Lombardo; 49' (0:1) Nkufo

Letzigrund, Zürich
Attendance: 1,600
Referee: (Switzerland) Dominique Tavel (Lonay)

== Quarter-finals ==
=== Summary ===
Team 1	Score	Team 2
5 May 1999
Red Star	2–1	Lugano
Delémont	1–2	Lausanne-Sport
Luzern	1–2	Grasshopper Club
Sion	1–2	Servette

=== Matches ===
5 May 1999

Red Star	2–1	Lugano
Firat 29' (1:0); Galliker (yellow card) 51'; Ronca 55' (2:0); Forte (yellow card) 82'	RSSSF summary	(yellow card) 20' Morf; (yellow card) 66' Lombardo; 68' (2:1) Giallanza

Letzigrund, Zürich
Attendance: 1,800
Referee: (Switzerland) Claude Detruche, (Thônex)

5 May 1999

Delémont	1–2	Lausanne-Sport
Jinani 13' (1:0); Ndlovu (yellow card) 28'	RSSSF summary	16' (1:1) Pantelić; 38' (1:2) Gerber; (red card) 40' Mazzoni

La Blancherie, Delémont
Attendance: 5,000
Referee: (Switzerland) Marcel Vollenweider (Rüti, Zürich)

5 May 1999

Luzern	1–2	Grasshopper Club
Scepanovic (yellow card) 35'; Scepanovic 49' (1:1)	RSSSF summary	(yellow card) 15' H. Yakin; 20' (0:1) H. Yakin; (yellow card) 37' Haas; (yellow card) 63' Sermeter; 67' (1:2) Cabanas; (yellow card) 78' Tararache

Stadion Allmend, Luzern
Attendance: 5,990
Referee: (Switzerland) Dieter Schoch (Attiswil)

5 May 1999

Sion	1–2	Servette
Biaggi 5' (1:0); Vanetta (yellow card) 26'; Sarni (yellow card) 27'; Biaggi (yellow card) 50'; Gigantelli (yellow card) 88'	Servette summary	(yellow card) 9' Juárez; (yellow card) 23' Vurens; (yellow card) 30' Barea; (yellow card) 45' Karlen; (yellow card) 49' Petrov; 72' (1:1) Bühlmann; 81' (1:2) Vurens; (yellow card) 87' Ouadja

Stade Tourbillon, Sion
Attendance: 4,350
Referee: (Switzerland) Andreas Schluchter (Schönenbuch)

== Semi-finals ==
=== Summary ===
Team 1	Score	Team 2
18 May 1999
Servette	0–1	Lausanne-Sport
20 May 1999
Red Star	0–7	Grasshopper Club

=== Matches ===
18 May 1999

Servette	0–1	Lausanne-Sport
Lonfat (yellow card) 27'; Fournier (yellow card) 86'; Karlen (yellow card) 48' (yellow-red card) 73'	Servette summary	19' (0:1) (yellow card) 86' Pantelić

Charmilles Stadium, Geneva
Attendance: 8,189
Referee: (Switzerland) Dieter Schoch (Attiswil)

20 May 1999

Red Star	0–7	Grasshopper Club
Fehr (yellow card) 31'; Galliker (yellow card) 34'; Ellenberger (penalty missed) 68′ Rohrer (yellow card) 73'	RSSSF summary	(yellow card) 6' Gren; (yellow card) 16' Magnin; 22' (0:1) Tikva; 33' (0:2) de Napoli; 35' (0:3) Gren; 48' (0:4) Tikva; 63' (0:5) Tikva; 82' (0:6) H. Yakin; 87' (0:7) Tikva

Letzigrund, Zürich
Attendance: 3,000
Referee: (Switzerland) Philippe Leuba (Chexbres)

== Final ==
The winners of the first drawn semi-final is considered as home team in the final.

=== Summary ===
Team 1	Score	Team 2
13 June 1999
Lausanne-Sport	2–0	Grasshopper Club

=== Telegram ===
13 June 1999
15:00

Lausanne-Sport	2–0	Grasshopper Club
Diogo 36' (1:0); Diogo (yellow card) 57'; Celestini (yellow card) 79'; Mazzoni 90' (2:0)	Report	(yellow card) 15' Tararache; (yellow card) 67' Comisetti

Wankdorf, Bern
Attendance: 18,000
Referee: (Liechtenstein) Roland Beck (Triesenberg)

Lausanne-Sport won the cup and this was the club's 9th cup title to this date and their second in a row.

== Further in Swiss football ==
- 1998–99 Nationalliga A
- 1998–99 Nationalliga B
- 1998–99 Swiss 1. Liga

Preceded by 1997–98	Seasons in Swiss Cup	Succeeded by 1999–2000

== Sources and references ==
- Switzerland Cup 1998/99 at RSSSF
