= 1997–98 Swiss 1. Liga =

1. Liga
- Season: 1997–98
- Champions: Overall; Chiasso; Group 1: Stade Nyonnais; Group 2: Serrières; Group 3: Chiasso; Group 4: Red Star
- Promoted: Stade Nyonnais; Chiasso
- Relegated: Group 1: Gland; Le Mont; Group 2: FC Marly; Alle; Group 3: Wohlen; Hochdorf; Dornach; Group 4: Bülach; FC Schwamendingen
- Matches: 4 times 182 plus 12 play-offs and 4 play-outs

The 1997–98 Swiss 1. Liga was the 66th season of this league since its creation in 1931. At this time, the 1. Liga was the third tier of the Swiss football league system and it was the highest level of amateur football.

== Format ==
There were 56 clubs in the 1. Liga, divided into four regional groups of 14 teams. Within each group, the teams would play a double round-robin to decide their league position. The four group winners and the four runners-up then contested a play-off for the two promotion slots. The two last placed teams in each group were directly relegated to the 2. Liga Interregional (fourth tier). The four third last placed teams would compete a play-out against the ninth relegation place.

== Group 1 ==
=== Teams ===
Club	Canton	Stadium	Capacity
FC Bex	Vaud	Relais	2,000
CS Chênois	Geneva	Stade des Trois-Chêne	8,000
FC Echallens	Vaud	Sportplatz 3 Sapins	2,000
FC Gland	Vaud	Centre sportif En Bord	2,000
Grand-Lancy FC	Geneva	Stade de Marignac	1,500
FC Stade Lausanne	Vaud	Centre sportif de Vidy	1,000
FC Le Mont	Vaud	Centre Sportif du Châtaignier	2,500
FC Martigny-Sports	Valais	Stade d'Octodure	2,500
FC Meyrin	Geneva	Stade des Arbères	9,000
FC Monthey	Valais	Stade Philippe Pottier	1,800
FC Naters	Valais	Sportanlage Stapfen	3,000
FC Stade Nyonnais	Vaud	Stade de Colovray	7,200
FC Renens	Waadt	Zone sportive du Censuy	2,300
Vevey Sports	Vaud	Stade de Copet	4,000

=== Final league table ===
Pos	Team	Pld	W	D	L	GF	GA	GD	Pts	Qualification or relegation
1	FC Stade Nyonnais	26	21	3	2	78	16	+62	66	Play-off to Nationalliga B
2	FC Meyrin	26	18	4	4	68	30	+38	58	Play-off to Nationalliga B
3	CS Chênois	26	17	5	4	68	31	+37	56	
4	FC Renens	26	14	2	10	54	42	+12	44	
5	FC Naters	26	11	6	9	39	34	+5	39	
6	FC Monthey	26	11	5	10	51	42	+9	38	
7	FC Bex	26	11	5	10	46	50	−4	38	
8	FC Martigny-Sports	26	9	8	9	41	39	+2	35	
9	Vevey Sports	26	9	5	12	39	41	−2	32	
10	FC Echallens	26	9	5	12	32	38	−6	32	
11	FC Stade Lausanne	26	7	7	12	41	55	−14	28	
12	Grand-Lancy FC	26	6	6	14	30	45	−15	24	Play-out against relegation
13	FC Gland	26	2	5	19	24	79	−55	11	Relegation to 2. Liga
14	FC Le Mont	26	2	4	20	22	91	−69	10	Relegation to 2. Liga

Source: RSSSF
Rules for classification: 1) Points; 2) Goal difference; 3) Goals scored; 4) Head-to-head points; 5) Away goals scored; 6) Draw.

== Group 2 ==
=== Teams ===
Club	Canton	Stadium	Capacity
FC Alle	Jura	Centre Sportif Régional	2,000
FC Biel-Bienne	Bern	Stadion Gurzelen	15,000
FC Bulle	Fribourg	Stade de Bouleyres	7,000
SC Bümpliz 78	Bern	Bodenweid	4,000
FC Colombier	Neuchâtel	Stade des Chézards	2,500
FC Fribourg	Fribourg	Stade Universitaire	9,000
FC Grenchen	Solothurn	Stadium Brühl	15,100
FC Köniz	Bern	Sportplatz Liebefeld-Hessgut	2,600
FC La Chaux-de-Fonds	Neuchâtel	Centre Sportif de la Charrière	12,700
SV Lyss	Bern	Sportzentrum Grien	2,000
FC Marly	Fribourg	Stade de la Gérine	2,000
FC Münsingen	Bern	Sportanlage Sandreutenen	1,400
FC Serrières	Neuchâtel	Pierre-à-Bot	1,700
FC Wangen bei Olten	Solothurn	Sportplatz Chrüzmatt	3,000

=== Final league table ===
Pos	Team	Pld	W	D	L	GF	GA	GD	Pts	Qualification or relegation
1	FC Serrières	26	16	8	2	51	23	+28	56	Play-off to Nationalliga B
2	FC Münsingen	26	15	9	2	54	20	+34	54	Play-off to Nationalliga B
3	FC Grenchen	26	16	4	6	43	21	+22	52	
4	FC Wangen bei Olten	26	11	8	7	46	43	+3	41	
5	FC Biel-Bienne	26	10	8	8	48	43	+5	38	
6	FC Fribourg	26	10	7	9	53	39	+14	37	
7	SC Bümpliz 78]	26	9	8	9	48	47	+1	35	
8	FC La Chaux-de-Fonds	26	8	7	11	37	40	−3	31	
9	FC Colombier	26	6	11	9	22	29	−7	29	
10	FC Bulle	26	6	10	10	33	32	+1	28	
11	FC Köniz	26	6	9	11	33	48	−15	27	
12	SV Lyss	26	4	10	12	35	44	−9	22	Play-out against relegation
13	FC Marly	26	5	6	15	34	69	−35	21	Relegation to 2. Liga
14	FC Alle	26	5	5	16	23	52	−29	20	Relegation to 2. Liga

Source: RSSSF
Rules for classification: 1) Points; 2) Goal difference; 3) Goals scored; 4) Head-to-head points; 5) Away goals scored; 6) Draw.

== Group 3 ==
=== Teams ===
Club	Canton	Stadium	Capacity
FC Ascona	Ticino	Stadio Comunale Ascona	1,400
AC Bellinzona	Ticino	Stadio Comunale Bellinzona	5,000
GC Biaschesi	Ticino	Campo Sportivo "Al Vallone"	2,850
SC Buochs	Nidwalden	Stadion Seefeld	5,000
FC Chiasso	Ticino	Stadio Comunale Riva IV	4,000
FC Concordia Basel	Basel-City	Stadion Rankhof	7,000
SC Dornach	Solothurn	Gigersloch	2,500
FC Hochdorf	Lucerne	Arena	3,150
FC Muri	Aargau	Stadion Brühl	2,350
SV Muttenz	Basel-Country	Sportplatz Margelacker	3,200
FC Riehen	Basel-City	Sportplatz Grendelmatte	2,500
FC Schötz	Lucerne	Sportplatz Wissenhusen	1,750
FC Sursee	Lucerne	Stadion Schlottermilch	3,500
FC Wohlen	Aargau	Stadion Niedermatten	3,734

=== Final league table ===
Pos	Team	Pld	W	D	L	GF	GA	GD	Pts	Qualification or relegation
1	FC Chiasso	26	15	6	5	38	21	+17	51	Play-off to Nationalliga B
2	SV Muttenz	26	14	7	5	49	23	+26	49	Play-off to Nationalliga B
3	FC Schötz	26	14	4	8	48	37	+11	46	
4	GC Biaschesi	26	12	8	6	41	26	+15	44	
5	SC Buochs	26	12	7	7	42	30	+12	43	
6	FC Concordia Basel	26	11	8	7	40	41	−1	41	
7	FC Ascona	26	10	7	9	33	32	+1	37	
8	AC Bellinzona	26	10	6	10	44	31	+13	36	
9	FC Riehen	26	8	8	10	38	44	−6	32	
10	FC Sursee	26	7	10	9	41	52	−11	31	
11	FC Muri	26	6	8	12	22	54	−32	26	
12	SC Dornach	26	7	4	15	35	51	−16	25	Play-out against relegation
13	FC Wohlen	26	3	10	13	28	45	−17	19	Relegation to 2. Liga
14	FC Hochdorf	26	4	5	17	22	54	−32	17	Relegation to 2. Liga

Source: RSSSF
Rules for classification: 1) Points; 2) Goal difference; 3) Goals scored; 4) Head-to-head points; 5) Away goals scored; 6) Draw.

== Group 4 ==
=== Teams ===
Club	Canton	Stadium	Capacity
FC Altstetten	Zürich	Buchlern	1,000
FC Bülach	Zürich	Stadion Erachfeld	3,500
FC Frauenfeld	Thurgau	Kleine Allmend	6,370
FC Freienbach	Schwyz	Chrummen	4,500
FC Gossau	St. Gallen	Sportanlage Buechenwald	3,500
FC Kreuzlingen	Thurgau	Sportplatz Hafenareal	1,200
FC Rapperswil-Jona	St. Gallen	Stadion Grünfeld	2,500
FC Red Star Zürich	Zürich	Allmend Brunau	2,000
FC Rorschach	Schwyz	Sportplatz Kellen	1,000
FC Schwamendingen	Zürich	Sportanlage Heerenschürli	1,522
FC Tuggen	Schwyz	Linthstrasse	2,800
FC Vaduz	Liechtenstein	Rheinpark Stadion	7,584
SC YF Juventus	Zürich	Utogrund	2,850
Zug 94	Zug	Herti Allmend Stadion	6,000

=== Final league table ===
Pos	Team	Pld	W	D	L	GF	GA	GD	Pts	Qualification or relegation
1	FC Red Star Zürich	26	18	1	7	48	29	+19	55	Play-off to Nationalliga B
2	FC Gossau	26	14	8	4	56	26	+30	50	Decider for play-off
3	Zug 94	26	16	2	8	62	33	+29	50	Decider winners, play-off to Nationalliga B
4	FC Tuggen	26	15	5	6	46	27	+19	50	
5	FC Frauenfeld	26	14	7	5	40	27	+13	49	
6	FC Rapperswil-Jona	26	10	7	9	43	29	+14	37	
7	SC Young Fellows Juventus	26	10	7	9	31	28	+3	37	
8	FC Altstetten	26	10	7	9	33	35	−2	37	
9	FC Vaduz	26	10	5	11	34	34	0	35	
10	FC Kreuzlingen	26	10	5	11	38	41	−3	35	
11	FC Rorschach	26	9	4	13	34	39	−5	31	
12	FC Freienbach	26	6	4	16	39	64	−25	22	Play-out against relegation
13	FC Bülach	26	4	6	16	28	57	−29	18	Relegation to 2. Liga
14	FC Schwamendingen	26	1	2	23	20	83	−63	5	Relegation to 2. Liga

Source: RSSSF
Rules for classification: 1) Points; 2) Goal difference; 3) Goals scored; 4) Head-to-head points; 5) Away goals scored; 6) Draw.

=== Decider ===
Because the teams from FC Gossau and Zug 94 ended the season level on points they had to play a league positions decider. The match was played on a neutral ground and it took place on 19 May 1998 in Allmend Brunau (Zürich).

Team 1	Score	Team 2
Zug 94	3–0	FC Gossau

Zug 94 win the decider and advance to play-offs.

== Promotion play-offs ==
=== Qualification round ===
Team 1	Score	Team 2
Muttenz	1–1	Red Star
Red Star	1–5	Muttenz

Muttenz win 6–2 on aggregate and continue to the finals.

Team 1	Score	Team 2
Münsingen	1–0	Stade Nyonnais
Stade Nyonnais	2–0	Münsingen

Stade Nyonnais win 2–1 on aggregate and continue to the finals.

Team 1	Score	Team 2
Zug 94	0–0	Chiasso
Chiasso	2–1	Zug 94

Chiasso win 2–1 on aggregate and continue to the finals.

Team 1	Score	Team 2
FC Meyrin	2–2	Serrières
Serrières	2–2; 5–3 a.e.t.	FC Meyrin

Aggregate 4–4. Serrières win in overtime and continue to the finals.

=== Final round ===
Team 1	Score	Team 2
Stade Nyonnais	3–2	Muttenz
Muttenz	0–1	Stade Nyonnais

Stade Nyonnais win 4–2 on aggregate and are promoted to Nationalliga B.

Team 1	Score	Team 2
Serrières	0–1	Chiasso
Chiasso	3–0	Serrières

Chiasso win 4–0 on aggregate and are promoted to Nationalliga B.

== Relegation play-out ==
=== First round ===
Team 1	Score	Team 2
Grand-Lancy	2–1	SV Lyss

SV Lyss continue to the final.

Team 1	Score	Team 2
Freienbach	4–1	Dornach

Dornach continue to the final.

=== Final round ===
Team 1	Score	Team 2
SV Lyss	4–0	Dornach
Dornach	1–3	SV Lyss

SV Lyss win 7–1 on aggregate. Dornach are relegated to 2. Liga.

== See also ==
- 1997–98 Nationalliga A
- 1997–98 Nationalliga B
- 1997–98 Swiss Cup

== Sources ==
- Switzerland 1997–98 at RSSSF

Preceded by 1996–97	Seasons in Swiss 1. Liga	Succeeded by 1998–99
