= 1998–99 Swiss 1. Liga =

1. Liga
- Season: 1998–99
- Champions: Overall; Bellinzona; Group 1: Echallens; Group 2: Fribourg; Group 3: Bellinzona; Group 4: Winterthur
- Promoted: Winterthur; Bellinzona
- Relegated: Group 1: Monthey; FC Bramois; Montreux-Sports; Group 2: FC Riehen; Köniz; Group 3: Biaschesi; FC Muri; Group 4: SC Veltheim; FC Wetzikon
- Matches: 4 times 182 plus 12 play-offs and 4 play-outs

The 1998–1999 Swiss 1. Liga was the 67th season of this league since its creation in 1931. At this time, the 1. Liga was the third tier of the Swiss football league system and it was the highest level of amateur football.

== Format ==
There were 56 clubs in the 1. Liga, divided into four regional groups of 14 teams. Within each group, the teams would play a double round-robin to decide their league position. The four group winners and the four runners-up then contested a play-off for the two promotion slots. The two last placed teams in each group were directly relegated to the 2. Liga Interregional (fourth tier). The four third-last placed teams would compete a play-out against the ninth relegation place.

== Group 1 ==
=== Teams ===
Club	Canton	Stadium	Capacity
FC Bex	Vaud	Relais	2,000
FC Bramois	Valais	Stade du Bois-de-la-Borgne/Glareys	1,000
CS Chênois	Geneva	Stade des Trois-Chêne	8,000
FC Echallens	Vaud	Sportplatz 3 Sapins	2,000
Grand-Lancy FC	Geneva	Stade de Marignac	1,500
FC Martigny-Sports	Valais	Stade d'Octodure	2,500
FC Meyrin	Geneva	Stade des Arbères	9,000
FC Monthey	Valais	Stade Philippe Pottier	1,800
FC Montreux-Sports	Vaud	Stade de Chailly	1,000
FC Naters	Valais	Sportanlage Stapfen	3,000
FC Renens	Waadt	Zone sportive du Censuy	2,300
Signal FC Bernex-Confignon	Geneva	Stade municipal de Bernex	1,000
FC Stade Lausanne	Vaud	Centre sportif de Vidy	1,000
Vevey Sports	Vaud	Stade de Copet	4,000

=== Final league table ===
Pos	Team	Pld	W	D	L	GF	GA	GD	Pts	Qualification or relegation
1	FC Echallens	26	19	4	3	51	15	+36	61	Play-off to Nationalliga B
2	Vevey Sports	26	14	7	5	57	34	+23	49	Play-off to Nationalliga B
3	FC Bex	26	14	4	8	51	37	+14	46	
4	FC Meyrin	26	13	4	9	58	44	+14	43	
5	FC Naters	26	11	9	6	41	34	+7	42	
6	CS Chênois	26	11	7	8	36	27	+9	40	
7	FC Martigny-Sports	26	10	6	10	54	52	+2	36	
8	Grand-Lancy FC	26	8	8	10	32	36	−4	32	
9	FC Renens	26	8	7	11	40	40	0	31	
10	Signal FC	26	8	7	11	39	57	−18	31	
11	FC Stade Lausanne	26	8	6	12	40	48	−8	30	
12	FC Montreux-Sports	26	7	4	15	27	47	−20	25	Play-out against relegation
13	FC Monthey	26	5	5	16	21	45	−24	20	Relegation to 2. Liga
14	FC Bramois	26	5	4	17	29	60	−31	19	Relegation to 2. Liga

Source: RSSSF
Rules for classification: 1) Points; 2) Goal difference; 3) Goals scored; 4) Head-to-head points; 5) Away goals scored; 6) Draw.

== Group 2 ==
=== Teams ===
Club	Canton	Stadium	Capacity
FC Biel-Bienne	Bern	Stadion Gurzelen	15,000
FC Bulle	Fribourg	Stade de Bouleyres	7,000
SC Bümpliz 78	Bern	Bodenweid	4,000
FC Colombier	Neuchâtel	Stade des Chézards	2,500
FC Concordia Basel	Basel-City	Stadion Rankhof	7,000
FC Fribourg	Fribourg	Stade Universitaire	9,000
FC Grenchen	Solothurn	Stadium Brühl	15,100
FC Köniz	Bern	Sportplatz Liebefeld-Hessgut	2,600
FC La Chaux-de-Fonds	Neuchâtel	Centre Sportif de la Charrière	12,700
SV Lyss	Bern	Sportzentrum Grien	000
FC Münsingen	Bern	Sportanlage Sandreutenen	1,400
SV Muttenz	Basel-Country	Sportplatz Margelacker	3,200
FC Riehen	Basel-City	Sportplatz Grendelmatte	2,500
FC Serrières	Neuchâtel	Pierre-à-Bot	1,700

=== Final league table ===
Pos	Team	Pld	W	D	L	GF	GA	GD	Pts	Qualification or relegation
1	FC Fribourg	26	18	5	3	69	28	+41	59	Play-off to Nationalliga B
2	FC Münsingen	26	16	7	3	58	24	+34	55	Play-off to Nationalliga B
3	FC Serrières	26	15	7	4	51	26	+25	52	
4	FC Biel-Bienne	26	13	9	4	42	25	+17	48	
5	FC Grenchen	26	13	5	8	49	30	+19	44	
6	FC Bulle	26	9	9	8	35	40	−5	36	
7	FC La Chaux-de-Fonds	26	8	8	10	27	41	−14	32	
8	SC Bümpliz 78	26	8	7	11	27	41	−14	31	
9	SV Lyss	26	7	6	13	26	39	−13	27	
10	SV Muttenz	26	6	8	12	31	47	−16	26	
11	FC Concordia Basel	26	5	9	12	33	43	−10	24	
12	FC Colombier	26	6	5	15	29	41	−12	23	Play-out against relegation
13	FC Riehen	26	6	4	16	33	67	−34	22	Relegation to 2. Liga
14	FC Köniz	26	4	7	15	30	48	−18	19	Relegation to 2. Liga

Source: RSSSF
Rules for classification: 1) Points; 2) Goal difference; 3) Goals scored; 4) Head-to-head points; 5) Away goals scored; 6) Draw.

== Group 3 ==
=== Teams ===
Club	Canton	Stadium	Capacity
FC Altstetten	Zürich	Buchlern	1,000
FC Ascona	Ticino	Stadio Comunale Ascona	1,400
AC Bellinzona	Ticino	Stadio Comunale Bellinzona	5,000
GC Biaschesi	Ticino	Campo Sportivo "Al Vallone"	2,850
SC Buochs	Nidwalden	Stadion Seefeld	5,000
FC Küsnacht	Zürich	Sportanlage Heslibach	2,300
FC Malcantone Agno	Ticino	Cornaredo Stadium	6,330
FC Muri	Aargau	Stadion Brühl	2,350
FC Red Star Zürich	Zürich	Allmend Brunau	2,000
FC Schötz	Lucerne	Sportplatz Wissenhusen	1,750
FC Sursee	Lucerne	Stadion Schlottermilch	3,500
FC Wangen bei Olten	Solothurn	Sportplatz Chrüzmatt	3,000
SC YF Juventus	Zürich	Utogrund	2,850
Zug 94	Zug	Herti Allmend Stadion	6,000

=== Final league table ===
Pos	Team	Pld	W	D	L	GF	GA	GD	Pts	Qualification or relegation
1	AC Bellinzona	26	21	4	1	76	22	+54	67	Play-off to Nationalliga B
2	SC Buochs	26	17	3	6	66	37	+29	54	Play-off to Nationalliga B
3	FC Schötz	26	11	9	6	63	38	+25	42	
4	FC Sursee	26	12	4	10	42	48	−6	40	
5	FC Wangen bei Olten	26	10	9	7	46	42	+4	39	
6	FC Red Star Zürich	26	8	12	6	34	30	+4	36	
7	FC Altstetten	26	9	7	10	38	41	−3	34	
8	Zug 94	26	9	6	11	33	41	−8	33	
9	FC Malcantone Agno	26	7	11	8	32	37	−5	32	
10	FC Ascona	26	7	8	11	39	48	−9	29	
11	SC Young Fellows Juventus	26	7	7	12	27	38	−11	28	
12	FC Küsnacht	26	7	5	14	30	50	−20	26	Play-out against relegation
13	GC Biaschesi	26	4	7	15	23	47	−24	19	Relegation to 2. Liga
14	FC Muri	26	4	6	16	19	49	−30	18	Relegation to 2. Liga

Source: RSSSF
Rules for classification: 1) Points; 2) Goal difference; 3) Goals scored; 4) Head-to-head points; 5) Away goals scored; 6) Draw.

== Group 4 ==
=== Teams ===
Club	Canton	Stadium	Capacity
FC Frauenfeld	Thurgau	Kleine Allmend	6,370
FC Freienbach	Schwyz	Chrummen	4,500
FC Gossau	St. Gallen	Sportanlage Buechenwald	3,500
FC Horgen	Zürich	Waldegg	2,000
FC Kreuzlingen	Thurgau	Sportplatz Hafenareal	1,200
FC Rapperswil-Jona	St. Gallen	Stadion Grünfeld	2,500
FC Rorschach	Schwyz	Sportplatz Kellen	1,000
SV Schaffhausen	Schaffhausen	Sportplatz Bühl	1,000
FC Tuggen	Schwyz	Linthstrasse	2,800
FC Vaduz	Liechtenstein	Rheinpark Stadion	7,584
SC Veltheim	Aargau	Sportanlage Flüeli	2,000
FC Wetzikon	Zürich	Meierwiesen	2,000
FC Widnau	Zürich	Sportanlage Aegeten	2,000
FC Winterthur	Zürich	Schützenwiese	8,550

=== Final league table ===
Pos	Team	Pld	W	D	L	GF	GA	GD	Pts	Qualification or relegation
1	FC Winterthur	26	21	4	1	98	12	+86	67	Play-off to Nationalliga B
2	FC Vaduz	26	15	5	6	49	32	+17	50	Play-off to Nationalliga B
3	FC Rapperswil-Jona	26	11	7	8	44	38	+6	40	
4	FC Tuggen	26	10	9	7	42	34	+8	39	
5	FC Rorschach	26	11	5	10	35	50	−15	38	
6	FC Frauenfeld	26	10	7	9	43	38	+5	37	
7	FC Horgen	26	9	8	9	42	49	−7	35	
8	FC Kreuzlingen	26	7	10	9	28	35	−7	31	
9	SV Schaffhausen	26	7	10	9	22	33	−11	31	
10	FC Widnau	26	5	13	8	26	44	−18	28	
11	FC Freienbach	26	7	7	12	37	56	−19	28	
12	FC Gossau	26	6	8	12	42	43	−1	26	Play-out against relegation
13	SC Veltheim	26	6	6	14	35	46	−11	24	Relegation to 2. Liga
14	FC Wetzikon	26	4	7	15	18	51	−33	19	Relegation to 2. Liga

Source: RSSSF
Rules for classification: 1) Points; 2) Goal difference; 3) Goals scored; 4) Head-to-head points; 5) Away goals scored; 6) Draw.

== Promotion play-off ==
=== Qualification round ===
Team 1	Score	Team 2
Winterthur	0–0	Buochs
Buochs	0–4	Winterthur

Winterthur win 4–0 on aggregate and continue to the finals.

Team 1	Score	Team 2
Vevey Sports	0–0	Fribourg
Fribourg	2–4	Vevey Sports

Vevey Sports win 4–2 on aggregate and continue to the finals.

Team 1	Score	Team 2
Münsingen	1–1	FC Echallens
FC Echallens	1–2	Münsingen

Münsingen win 3–2 on aggregate and continue to the finals.

Team 1	Score	Team 2
Bellinzona	3–0	Vaduz
Vaduz	0–2	Bellinzona

Bellinzona win 5–0 on aggregate and continue to the finals.

=== Final round ===
Team 1	Score	Team 2
Winterthur	3–0	Münsingen
Münsingen	1–0	Winterthur

Winterthur win 3–1 on aggregate and are promoted to Nationalliga B.

Team 1	Score	Team 2
Bellinzona	9–0	Vevey Sports
Vevey Sports	0–5	Bellinzona

Bellinzona win 14–0 on aggregate and are promoted to Nationalliga B.

== Relegation play-out ==
=== First round ===
Team 1	Score	Team 2
Montreux-Sports	1–3	Colombier

Montreux-Sports continue to the final.

Team 1	Score	Team 2
Küsnacht	1–3	Gossau

Küsnacht] continue to the final.

=== Final round ===
Team 1	Score	Team 2
Montreux-Sports	1–2	Küsnacht
Küsnacht	4–0	Montreux-Sports

Küsnacht win 6–1 on aggregate. Montreux-Sports are relegated to 2. Liga.

== See also ==
- 1998–99 Nationalliga A
- 1998–99 Nationalliga B
- 1998–99 Swiss Cup

== Sources ==
- Switzerland 1998–99 at RSSSF

Preceded by 1997–98	Seasons in Swiss 1. Liga	Succeeded by 1999–2000
