= 1996–97 Swiss 1. Liga =

1. Liga
- Season: 1996–97
- Champions: Overall; Thun; Group 1: FC Renens; Group 2: Serrières; Group 3: FC Ascona; Group 4: Tuggen
- Promoted: Thun; SV Schaffhausen
- Relegated: Group 1: Montreux-Sports; Central Fribourg; Bex; Group 2: FC Noiraigue; FC Klus-Balsthal; Group 3: Mendrisio; FC Suhr; Group 4: Balzers; FC Glarus
- Matches: 4 times 182 plus 12 play-offs and 4 play-outs

The 1996–97 Swiss 1. Liga was the 65th season of this league since its creation in 1931. At this time, the 1. Liga was the third tier of the Swiss football league system and it was the highest level of amateur football.

== Format ==
There were 56 clubs in the 1. Liga, divided into four regional groups of 14 teams. Within each group, the teams would play a double round-robin to decide their league position. The four group winners and the four runners-up then contested a play-off for the two promotion slots. The two last placed teams in each group were directly relegated to the 2. Liga (fourth tier). The four third-last placed teams would compete a play-out against the ninth relegation place.

== Group 1 ==
=== Teams ===
Club	Canton	Stadium	Capacity
FC Bex	Vaud	Relais	2,000
FC Bulle	Fribourg	Stade de Bouleyres	7,000
FC Central Fribourg	Fribourg	Guintzet	2,000
CS Chênois	Geneva	Stade des Trois-Chêne	8,000
FC Echallens	Vaud	Sportplatz 3 Sapins	2,000
FC Fribourg	Fribourg	Stade Universitaire	9,000
Grand-Lancy FC	Geneva	Stade de Marignac	1,500
FC Martigny-Sports	Valais	Stade d'Octodure	2,500
FC Monthey	Valais	Stade Philippe Pottier	1,800
FC Montreux-Sports	Vaud	Stade de Chailly	1,000
FC Renens	Waadt	Zone sportive du Censuy	2,300
FC Stade Lausanne	Vaud	Centre sportif de Vidy	1,000
FC Stade Nyonnais	Vaud	Stade de Colovray	7,200
Vevey Sports	Vaud	Stade de Copet	4,000

=== Final league table ===
Pos	Team	Pld	W	D	L	GF	GA	GD	Pts	Qualification or relegation
1	FC Renens	26	17	9	0	52	14	+38	60	Play-off to Nationalliga B
2	FC Fribourg	26	14	4	8	46	33	+13	46	Play-off to Nationalliga B
3	FC Stade Nyonnais	26	12	6	8	42	31	+11	42	
4	FC Bulle	26	11	8	7	43	43	0	41	
5	FC Martigny-Sports	26	12	3	11	55	36	+19	39	
6	FC Monthey	26	9	9	8	44	47	−3	36	
7	FC Stade Lausanne	26	8	11	7	34	29	+5	35	
8	FC Echallens	26	8	9	9	32	34	−2	33	
9	Grand-Lancy FC	26	8	8	10	34	44	−10	32	
10	Vevey Sports	26	7	10	9	44	44	0	31	
11	CS Chênois	26	8	7	11	42	43	−1	31	
12	FC Bex	26	8	6	12	36	45	−9	30	Play-out against relegation
13	FC Montreux-Sports	26	5	6	15	21	60	−39	21	Relegation to 2. Liga
14	Central Fribourg	26	4	6	16	38	60	−22	18	Relegation to 2. Liga

Source: RSSSF
Rules for classification: 1) Points; 2) Goal difference within the league, but play-off for qualifiers.

== Group 2 ==
=== Teams ===
Club	Canton	Stadium	Capacity
FC Biel-Bienne	Bern	Stadion Gurzelen	15,000
SC Bümpliz 78	Bern	Bodenweid	4,000
FC Colombier	Neuchâtel	Stade des Chézards	2,500
FC Grenchen	Solothurn	Stadium Brühl	15,100
FC Klus-Balsthal	Solothurn	Sportplatz Moos	4,000
FC Köniz	Bern	Sportplatz Liebefeld-Hessgut	2,600
FC La Chaux-de-Fonds	Neuchâtel	Centre Sportif de la Charrière	12,700
SV Lyss	Bern	Sportzentrum Grien	2,000
FC Münsingen	Bern	Sportanlage Sandreutenen	1,400
FC Naters	Valais	Sportanlage Stapfen	3,000
FC Noiraigue	Neuchâtel	Centre Sportif Noiraigue	1,300
FC Serrières	Neuchâtel	Pierre-à-Bot	1,700
FC Thun	Bern	Stadion Lachen	10,350
FC Wangen bei Olten	Solothurn	Sportplatz Chrüzmatt	3,000

=== Final league table ===
Pos	Team	Pld	W	D	L	GF	GA	GD	Pts	Qualification or relegation
1	FC Serrières	26	17	5	4	52	19	+33	56	Play-off to Nationalliga B
2	FC Thun	26	17	4	5	48	26	+22	55	Play-off to Nationalliga B
3	FC Biel-Bienne	26	15	8	3	53	27	+26	53	
4	FC Naters	26	14	7	5	58	30	+28	49	
5	FC Münsingen	26	13	6	7	41	25	+16	45	
6	FC Grenchen	26	10	8	8	39	29	+10	38	
7	FC Wangen bei Olten	26	8	11	7	42	35	+7	35	
8	FC Colombier	26	8	7	11	41	41	0	31	
9	FC La Chaux-de-Fonds	26	7	9	10	37	52	−15	30	
10	SV Lyss	26	7	8	11	41	45	−4	29	
11	FC Köniz	26	3	12	11	30	54	−24	21	
12	SC Bümpliz 78	26	4	8	14	28	46	−18	20	Play-out against relegation
13	FC Noiraigue	26	3	7	16	24	62	−38	16	Relegation to 2. Liga
14	FC Klus-Balsthal	26	3	6	17	23	66	−43	15	Relegation to 2. Liga

Source: RSSSF
Rules for classification: 1) Points; 2) Goal difference within the league, but play-off for qualifiers.

== Group 3 ==
=== Teams ===
Club	Canton	Stadium	Capacity
FC Ascona	Ticino	Stadio Comunale Ascona	1,400
AC Bellinzona	Ticino	Stadio Comunale Bellinzona	5,000
SC Buochs	Nidwalden	Stadion Seefeld	5,000
FC Chiasso	Ticino	Stadio Comunale Riva IV	4,000
FC Concordia Basel	Basel-City	Stadion Rankhof	7,000
FC Hochdorf	Lucerne	Arena	3,150
FC Mendrisio	Ticino	Centro Sportivo Comunale	4,000
FC Muri	Aargau	Stadion Brühl	2,350
SV Muttenz	Basel-Country	Sportplatz Margelacker	3,200
FC Riehen	Basel-City	Sportplatz Grendelmatte	2,500
FC Schötz	Lucerne	Sportplatz Wissenhusen	1,750
FC Suhr	Aargau	Hofstattmatten	2,000
FC Sursee	Lucerne	Stadion Schlottermilch	3,500
Zug 94	Zug	Herti Allmend Stadion	6,000

=== Final league table ===
Pos	Team	Pld	W	D	L	GF	GA	GD	Pts	Qualification or relegation
1	FC Ascona	26	16	7	3	54	21	+33	55	Play-off to Nationalliga B
2	Zug 94	26	12	10	4	39	20	+19	46	Play-off to Nationalliga B
3	AC Bellinzona	26	12	9	5	39	25	+14	45	
4	FC Riehen	26	13	5	8	39	29	+10	44	
5	SC Buochs	26	10	12	4	38	22	+16	42	
6	FC Chiasso	26	12	6	8	34	20	+14	42	
7	SV Muttenz	26	11	6	9	40	35	+5	39	
8	FC Schötz	26	10	6	10	32	32	0	36	
9	FC Sursee	26	8	8	10	38	42	−4	32	
10	FC Muri	26	6	11	9	22	30	−8	29	
11	FC Hochdorf	26	7	5	14	23	46	−23	26	
12	FC Concordia Basel	26	6	7	13	27	44	−17	25	Play-out against relegation
13	FC Mendrisio	26	4	6	16	16	48	−32	18	Relegation to 2. Liga
14	FC Suhr	26	3	6	17	23	50	−27	15	Relegation to 2. Liga

Source: RSSSF
Rules for classification: 1) Points; 2) Goal difference within the league, but play-off for qualifiers.

== Group 4 ==
=== Teams ===
Club	Canton	Stadium	Capacity
FC Altstetten	Zürich	Buchlern	1,000
FC Balzers	Liechtenstein	Sportplatz Rheinau	2,000
FC Bülach	Zürich	Stadion Erachfeld	3,500
FC Dübendorf	Zürich	Zelgli	1,500
FC Frauenfeld	Thurgau	Kleine Allmend	6,370
FC Freienbach	Schwyz	Chrummen	4,500
FC Glarus	Glarus	Buchholz	800
FC Rapperswil-Jona	St. Gallen	Stadion Grünfeld	2,500
FC Red Star Zürich	Zürich	Allmend Brunau	2,000
FC Rorschach	Schwyz	Sportplatz Kellen	1,000
SV Schaffhausen	Schaffhausen	Sportplatz Bühl	1,000
FC Tuggen	Schwyz	Linthstrasse	2,800
FC Vaduz	Liechtenstein	Rheinpark Stadion	7,584
SC YF Juventus	Zürich	Utogrund	2,850

=== Final league table ===
Pos	Team	Pld	W	D	L	GF	GA	GD	Pts	Qualification or relegation
1	FC Tuggen	26	16	4	6	51	27	+24	52	Play-off to Nationalliga B
2	SV Schaffhausen	26	14	5	7	48	34	+14	47	Play-off to Nationalliga B
3	FC Rapperswil-Jona	26	13	7	6	58	30	+28	46	
4	FC Altstetten	26	14	4	8	44	29	+15	46	
5	FC Frauenfeld	26	11	9	6	53	35	+18	42	
6	FC Vaduz	26	11	8	7	38	31	+7	41	
7	FC Rorschach	26	11	5	10	45	41	+4	38	
8	FC Freienbach	26	9	10	7	38	42	−4	37	
9	FC Red Star Zürich	26	9	6	11	48	52	−4	33	
10	FC Bülach	26	9	5	12	37	38	−1	32	
11	SC Young Fellows Juventus	26	7	9	10	34	33	+1	30	
12	FC Dübendorf	26	5	7	14	26	52	−26	22	Play-out against relegation
13	FC Balzers	26	4	6	16	21	49	−28	18	Relegation to 2. Liga
14	FC Glarus	26	5	3	18	19	67	−48	18	Relegation to 2. Liga

Source: RSSSF
Rules for classification: 1) Points; 2) Goal difference within the league, but play-off for qualifiers.

== Promotion play-off ==
=== Qualification round ===
Team 1	Score	Team 2
Fribourg	1–1	Serrières
Serrières	3–2	Fribourg

Serrières win 4–3 on aggregate and continue to the finals.

Team 1	Score	Team 2
Thun	2–1	FC Renens
FC Renens	0–1	Thun

Thun win 3–1 on aggregate and continue to the finals.

Team 1	Score	Team 2
Zug 94	1–4	Tuggen
Tuggen	4–0	Zug 94

Tuggen win 8–1 on aggregate and continue to the finals.

Team 1	Score	Team 2
SV Schaffhausen	1–0	FC Ascona
FC Ascona	1–2	SV Schaffhausen

SV Schaffhausen win 3–1 on aggregate and continue to the finals.

=== Final round ===
Team 1	Score	Team 2
Tuggen	1–0	Thun
Thun	2–0	Tuggen

Thun win 2–1 on aggregate and are promoted to Nationalliga B.

Team 1	Score	Team 2
Serrières	4–3	SV Schaffhausen
SV Schaffhausen	1–0	Serrières

4–4 on aggregate. SV Schaffhausen win on away goals and are promoted to Nationalliga B.

== Relegation play-out ==
=== First round ===
Team 1	Score	Team 2
Bümpliz	2–1	Bex

Bex continue to the final.

Team 1	Score	Team 2
Concordia	2–0	FC Dübendorf

FC Dübendorf continue to the final.

=== Final round ===
Team 1	Score	Team 2
Bex	4–2	FC Dübendorf
FC Dübendorf	3–4	Bex

Bex win 8–5 on aggregate. FC Dübendorf are relegated to 2. Liga.

== See also ==
- 1996–97 Nationalliga A
- 1996–97 Nationalliga B
- 1996–97 Swiss Cup

== Sources ==
- Switzerland 1996–97 at RSSSF

Preceded by 1995–96	Seasons in Swiss 1. Liga	Succeeded by 1997–98
