= 1999–2000 Swiss 1. Liga =

1. Liga
- Season: 1999–2000
- Champions: Group 1: Chênois; Group 2: Wangen b.O. Group 3: Locarno; Group 4: Vaduz
- Promoted: Wangen b.O. Locarno
- Relegated: Group 1: Renes; Visp; Signal; Group 2: Bümpliz; Stade Payerne; Lyss; Group 3: Küsnacht; Ascona; Cham; Group 4: Wülflingen; Frauenfeld; Eschen/Mauren
- Matches: 4 times 182 plus 12 play-offs

The 1999–2000 Swiss 1. Liga was the 68th season of this league since its creation in 1931. At this time, the 1. Liga was the third tier of the Swiss football league system and it was the highest level of amateur football.

== Format ==
The Swiss Football Association (SFV-ASF) were changing the format of the Swiss football league system to the beginning of the following season. Up until and including this season, there were 56 clubs in the 1. Liga, divided into four groups of 14 teams. This was to be reduced to 48 teams and would be divided new into just three groups of 16 teams. These would then also include the best youth teams of the professional clubs from the Super League and the Challenge League. The Swiss youth U-20 championship was to be despanded, these teams would then be called U-21 and would be eligible to play in the third tier or fourth tier. The four top teams in this last U-20 championship would advance to the new 1. Liga. This all meant that the number of relegations this season was increased to twelve.

In the 1999–2000 season, the 1. Liga clubs were divided into four regional groups, each with 14 teams. Within each group, the teams would play a double round-robin to decide their league position. The four group winners and the four runners-up then contested a play-off for the two promotion slots. The three last placed teams in each group were directly relegated to the newly named 2. Liga Interregional (fourth tier).

== Group 1 ==
=== Teams ===
| Club | Canton | Stadium | Capacity |
|---|---|---|---|
| FC Bex | Vaud | Relais | 2,000 |
| FC Bulle | Fribourg | Stade de Bouleyres | 7,000 |
| CS Chênois | Geneva | Stade des Trois-Chêne | 8,000 |
| FC Echallens | Vaud | Sportplatz 3 Sapins | 2,000 |
| Grand-Lancy FC | Geneva | Stade de Marignac | 1,500 |
| FC Martigny-Sports | Valais | Stade d'Octodure | 2,500 |
| FC Meyrin | Geneva | Stade des Arbères | 9,000 |
| FC Naters | Valais | Sportanlage Stapfen | 3,000 |
| FC Renens | Waadt | Zone sportive du Censuy | 2,300 |
| Signal FC Bernex-Confignon | Geneva | Stade municipal de Bernex | 1,000 |
| FC Stade Lausanne | Vaud | Centre sportif de Vidy | 1,000 |
| US Terre Sainte | Vaud | Centre Sportif des Rojalets | 1,400 |
| Vevey Sports | Vaud | Stade de Copet | 4,000 |
| FC Visp | Valais | Sportplatz Mühleye | 1,000 |

=== Final league table ===
| Pos | Team | Pld | W | D | L | GF | GA | GD | Pts | Qualification or relegation |
|---|---|---|---|---|---|---|---|---|---|---|
| 1 | CS Chênois | 26 | 14 | 8 | 4 | 57 | 34 | +23 | 50 | Play-off to Nationalliga B |
| 2 | FC Bex | 26 | 15 | 3 | 8 | 54 | 42 | +12 | 48 | Not eligible for play-offs |
| 3 | FC Naters | 26 | 12 | 9 | 5 | 55 | 28 | +27 | 45 | Decider for play-off |
| 4 | FC Meyrin | 26 | 12 | 9 | 5 | 39 | 33 | +6 | 45 | Decider winners, play-off to Nationalliga B |
| 5 | Vevey Sports | 26 | 12 | 8 | 6 | 53 | 31 | +22 | 44 | |
| 6 | FC Echallens | 26 | 11 | 7 | 8 | 58 | 40 | +18 | 40 | |
| 7 | FC Martigny-Sports | 26 | 10 | 7 | 9 | 43 | 41 | +2 | 37 | |
| 8 | FC Bulle | 26 | 11 | 4 | 11 | 38 | 43 | −5 | 37 | |
| 9 | Grand-Lancy FC | 26 | 9 | 7 | 10 | 42 | 41 | +1 | 34 | |
| 10 | FC Stade Lausanne | 26 | 8 | 10 | 8 | 45 | 47 | −2 | 34 | |
| 11 | US Terre Sainte | 26 | 9 | 5 | 12 | 35 | 34 | +1 | 32 | |
| 12 | FC Renes | 26 | 9 | 4 | 13 | 46 | 58 | −12 | 31 | Relegation to 2. Liga Interregional |
| 13 | FC Visp | 26 | 4 | 4 | 18 | 29 | 61 | −32 | 16 | Relegation to 2. Liga Interregional |
| 14 | Signal FC Bernex-Confignon | 26 | 2 | 3 | 21 | 27 | 88 | −61 | 9 | Relegation to 2. Liga Interregional |

Source: Erste Liga official website
Rules for classification: 1) Points; 2) Goal difference within the league, but play-off for qualifiers.

=== Decider ===
Due the fact that the club FC Bex had infrastructural deficiencies, they were not eligible to enter the play-offs for promotion to the Nationalliga B, this right was passed down to the third placed club in the division. Because the teams from Naters and Meyrin ended the season level on points they had to play a league positions decider. The match was played on a neutral ground and it took place on May 24, 2000, in Martigny.

| Team 1 | Score | Team 2 |
|---|---|---|
| Meyrin | 2–0 | Naters |

Meyrin win the decider and advance to play-offs.

== Group 2 ==
=== Teams ===
| Club | Canton | Stadium | Capacity |
|---|---|---|---|
| FC Biel-Bienne | Bern | Stadion Gurzelen | 15,000 |
| SC Bümpliz 78 | Bern | Bodenweid | 4,000 |
| FC Colombier | Neuchâtel | Stade des Chézards | 2,500 |
| FC Concordia Basel | Basel-City | Stadion Rankhof | 7,000 |
| FC Fribourg | Fribourg | Stade Universitaire | 9,000 |
| FC Grenchen | Solothurn | Stadium Brühl | 15,100 |
| FC La Chaux-de-Fonds | Neuchâtel | Centre Sportif de la Charrière | 12,700 |
| SV Lyss | Bern | Sportzentrum Grien | 1,000 |
| FC Münsingen | Bern | Sportanlage Sandreutenen | 1,400 |
| SV Muttenz | Basel-Country | Sportplatz Margelacker | 3,200 |
| FC Serrières | Neuchâtel | Pierre-à-Bot | 1,700 |
| FC Stade Payerne | Vaud | Stade Municipal | 1,100 |
| FC Wangen bei Olten | Solothurn | Sportplatz Chrüzmatt | 3,000 |
| FC Wohlen | Aargau | Stadion Niedermatten | 3,734 |

=== Final league table ===
| Pos | Team | Pld | W | D | L | GF | GA | GD | Pts | Qualification or relegation |
|---|---|---|---|---|---|---|---|---|---|---|
| 1 | FC Wangen bei Olten | 26 | 18 | 5 | 3 | 52 | 23 | +29 | 59 | Play-off to Nationalliga B |
| 2 | FC Wohlen | 26 | 14 | 9 | 3 | 34 | 12 | +22 | 51 | Play-off to Nationalliga B |
| 3 | FC Fribourg | 26 | 14 | 6 | 6 | 61 | 28 | +33 | 48 | |
| 4 | FC Serrières | 26 | 13 | 9 | 4 | 38 | 20 | +18 | 48 | |
| 5 | FC Biel-Bienne | 26 | 11 | 10 | 5 | 42 | 37 | +5 | 43 | |
| 6 | FC Münsingen | 26 | 12 | 5 | 9 | 41 | 28 | +13 | 41 | |
| 7 | FC Colombier | 26 | 9 | 11 | 6 | 41 | 25 | +16 | 38 | |
| 8 | FC La Chaux-de-Fonds | 26 | 11 | 5 | 10 | 31 | 35 | −4 | 38 | |
| 9 | FC Grenchen | 26 | 8 | 8 | 10 | 33 | 35 | −2 | 32 | |
| 10 | FC Concordia Basel | 26 | 8 | 6 | 12 | 26 | 42 | −16 | 30 | |
| 11 | SV Muttenz | 26 | 7 | 4 | 15 | 33 | 48 | −15 | 25 | |
| 12 | SC Bümpliz 78 | 26 | 6 | 5 | 15 | 29 | 48 | −19 | 23 | Relegation to 2. Liga Interregional |
| 13 | FC Stade Payerne | 26 | 4 | 6 | 16 | 27 | 56 | −29 | 18 | Relegation to 2. Liga Interregional |
| 14 | SV Lyss | 26 | 1 | 3 | 22 | 18 | 69 | −51 | 6 | Relegation to 2. Liga Interregional |

Source: Erste Liga official website
Rules for classification: 1) Points; 2) Goal difference within the league, but play-off for qualifiers.

== Group 3 ==
=== Teams ===
| Club | Canton | Stadium | Capacity |
|---|---|---|---|
| FC Ascona | Ticino | Stadio Comunale Ascona | 1,400 |
| SC Buochs | Nidwalden | Stadion Seefeld | 5,000 |
| SC Cham | Zug | Stadion Eizmoos | 1,800 |
| FC Chiasso | Ticino | Stadio Comunale Riva IV | 4,000 |
| FC Freienbach | Schwyz | Chrummen | 4,500 |
| FC Küsnacht | Zürich | Sportanlage Heslibach | 2,300 |
| FC Locarno | Locarno, Ticino | Stadio comunale Lido | 5,000 |
| FC Malcantone Agno | Ticino | Cornaredo Stadium | 6,330 |
| FC Mendrisio | Ticino | Centro Sportivo Comunale | 4,000 |
| FC Rapperswil-Jona | St. Gallen | Stadion Grünfeld | 2,500 |
| FC Schötz | Lucerne | Sportplatz Wissenhusen | 1,750 |
| FC Sursee | Lucerne | Stadion Schlottermilch | 3,500 |
| FC Tuggen | Schwyz | Linthstrasse | 2,800 |
| Zug 94 | Zug | Herti Allmend Stadion | 6,000 |

=== Final league table ===
| Pos | Team | Pld | W | D | L | GF | GA | GD | Pts | Qualification or relegation |
|---|---|---|---|---|---|---|---|---|---|---|
| 1 | FC Locarno | 26 | 19 | 3 | 4 | 57 | 21 | +36 | 60 | Play-off to Nationalliga B |
| 2 | Zug 94 | 26 | 14 | 6 | 6 | 46 | 25 | +21 | 48 | Play-off to Nationalliga B |
| 3 | FC Tuggen | 26 | 14 | 5 | 7 | 59 | 30 | +29 | 47 | |
| 4 | FC Malcantone Agno | 26 | 14 | 5 | 7 | 42 | 31 | +11 | 47 | |
| 5 | FC Chiasso | 25 | 13 | 4 | 8 | 39 | 31 | +8 | 43 | |
| 6 | FC Schötz | 26 | 12 | 5 | 9 | 52 | 41 | +11 | 41 | |
| 7 | SC Buochs | 26 | 10 | 10 | 6 | 57 | 48 | +9 | 40 | |
| 8 | FC Rapperswil-Jona | 26 | 9 | 8 | 9 | 42 | 43 | −1 | 35 | |
| 9 | FC Mendrisio | 26 | 8 | 3 | 15 | 36 | 48 | −12 | 27 | |
| 10 | FC Freienbach | 26 | 8 | 3 | 15 | 32 | 53 | −21 | 27 | |
| 11 | FC Sursee | 26 | 7 | 5 | 14 | 36 | 63 | −27 | 26 | |
| 12 | FC Küsnacht | 26 | 5 | 7 | 14 | 31 | 57 | −26 | 22 | Relegation to 2. Liga Interregional |
| 13 | FC Ascona | 26 | 4 | 9 | 13 | 32 | 47 | −15 | 21 | Relegation to 2. Liga Interregional |
| 14 | SC Cham | 25 | 2 | 11 | 12 | 24 | 47 | −23 | 17 | Relegation to 2. Liga Interregional |

Source: Erste Liga official website
Rules for classification: 1) Points; 2) Goal difference within the league, but play-off for qualifiers.

== Group 4 ==
=== Teams ===
| Club | Canton | Stadium | Capacity |
|---|---|---|---|
| FC Altstetten | Zürich | Buchlern | 1,000 |
| USV Eschen/Mauren | Liechtenstein | Sportpark Eschen-Mauren | 6,000 |
| FC Frauenfeld | Thurgau | Kleine Allmend | 6,370 |
| FC Gossau | St. Gallen | Sportanlage Buechenwald | 3,500 |
| FC Horgen | Zürich | Waldegg | 1,000 |
| FC Kreuzlingen | Thurgau | Sportplatz Hafenareal | 1,200 |
| FC Red Star Zürich | Zürich | Allmend Brunau | 2,000 |
| FC Rorschach | Schwyz | Sportplatz Kellen | 1,000 |
| SV Schaffhausen | Schaffhausen | Sportplatz Bühl | 1,000 |
| FC Schwamendingen | Zürich | Sportanlage Heerenschürli | 1,522 |
| FC Vaduz | Liechtenstein | Rheinpark Stadion | 7,584 |
| FC Widnau | St. Gallen | Sportanlage Aegeten | 2,000 |
| FC Wülflingen | Zürich | Sporrer | 1,000 |
| SC YF Juventus | Zürich | Utogrund | 2,850 |

=== Final league table ===
| Pos | Team | Pld | W | D | L | GF | GA | GD | Pts | Qualification or relegation |
|---|---|---|---|---|---|---|---|---|---|---|
| 1 | FC Vaduz | 26 | 16 | 6 | 4 | 65 | 22 | +43 | 54 | Play-off to Nationalliga B |
| 2 | FC Red Star Zürich | 26 | 15 | 6 | 5 | 56 | 26 | +30 | 51 | Play-off to Nationalliga B |
| 3 | SC Young Fellows Juventus | 26 | 14 | 7 | 5 | 64 | 32 | +32 | 49 | |
| 4 | FC Kreuzlingen | 26 | 13 | 7 | 6 | 39 | 21 | +18 | 46 | |
| 5 | FC Gossau | 26 | 13 | 7 | 6 | 37 | 24 | +13 | 46 | |
| 6 | FC Altstetten | 26 | 12 | 8 | 6 | 47 | 25 | +22 | 44 | |
| 7 | FC Horgen | 26 | 11 | 4 | 11 | 42 | 48 | −6 | 37 | |
| 8 | FC Rorschach | 26 | 9 | 5 | 12 | 32 | 48 | −16 | 32 | |
| 9 | FC Widnau | 26 | 8 | 6 | 12 | 38 | 38 | 0 | 30 | |
| 10 | SV Schaffhausen | 26 | 9 | 3 | 14 | 30 | 52 | −22 | 30 | |
| 11 | FC Schwamendingen | 26 | 7 | 5 | 14 | 41 | 65 | −24 | 26 | |
| 12 | FC Wülflingen | 26 | 5 | 8 | 13 | 36 | 67 | −31 | 23 | Relegation to 2. Liga Interregional |
| 13 | FC Frauenfeld | 26 | 5 | 7 | 14 | 31 | 51 | −20 | 22 | Relegation to 2. Liga Interregional |
| 14 | USV Eschen/Mauren | 26 | 4 | 3 | 19 | 29 | 68 | −39 | 15 | Relegation to 2. Liga Interregional |

Source: Erste Liga official website
Rules for classification: 1) Points; 2) Goal difference within the league, but play-off for qualifiers.

== Promotion play-off ==
From group 1 the group champions Chênois and decider match winners Meyrin, from group 2 the group winners Wangen b.O. and runners-up Wohlen, from group 3 champions Locarno and runners up Zug 94 played together with group 4 winners Vaduz and runners-up Red Star played in the qualification round of the play-offs. The winners here would advance to the finals. The two final winners would be promoted to the Nationalliga B.

=== Qualification round ===
| Team 1 | Score | Team 2 |
|---|---|---|
| Meyrin | 0–4 | Wangen b.O. |
| Wangen b.O. | 1–2 | Meyrin |

Wangen b.O. win 5–2 on aggregate and continue to the finals.

| Team 1 | Score | Team 2 |
|---|---|---|
| Red Star | 0–2 | Locarno |
| Locarno | 2–1 | Red Star |

Locarno win 4–1 on aggregate and continue to the finals.

| Team 1 | Score | Team 2 |
|---|---|---|
| Zug 94 | 2–1 | Vaduz |
| Vaduz | 3–2 | Zug 94 |

4–4 on aggregate, Zug 94 win on away goals and continue to the finals.

| Team 1 | Score | Team 2 |
|---|---|---|
| Wohlen | 0–1 | ChênoisChênois |
| ChênoisChênois | 1–2 | Wohlen |

2–2 on aggregate, Wohlen win on away goals and continue to the finals.

=== Final round ===
| Team 1 | Score | Team 2 |
|---|---|---|
| Locarno | 3–1 | Wohlen |
| Wohlen | 3–3 | Locarno |

Locarno win 6–4 on aggregate and are promoted to Nationalliga B.

| Team 1 | Score | Team 2 |
|---|---|---|
| Zug 94 | 2–1 | Wangen b.O. |
| Wangen b.O. | 2–0 | Zug 94 |

Wangen b.O. win 3–2 on aggregate and are promoted to Nationalliga B.

== Summary ==
Group 1, group winners were Chênois, group 2 winners were Wangen b.O., group 3 winners were Locarno and group 4 winners were Vaduz. In the promotion play-offs Locarno and Wangen b.O. achieved promotion. Relegated were, from group 1: Renes, Visp and Signal, from group 2: Bümpliz, Stade Payerne and Lyss and from group 3: Küsnacht, Ascona and Cham. Finally from group 4: Wülflingen, Frauenfeld and Eschen/Mauren also suffered relegation.

The remaining teams in the division would be joined by Stade Nyonnais and FC Schaffhausen who suffered relegation from the Nationalliga B this season. They would also be joined by the four youth teams Servette U-21, Grasshopper Club U-21, St. Gallen U-21 and Lausanne-Sport U-21.

== See also ==
- 1999–2000 Nationalliga A
- 1999–2000 Swiss Cup

== Sources ==
- Switzerland 1999–2000 at RSSSF
- Season 1999–2000 at the official website

| Preceded by 1998–99 | Seasons in Swiss 1. Liga | Succeeded by 2000–01 |
