= Pascal Thrier =

Swiss footballer (born 1984)

Personal information
- Full name: Pascal Thrier
- Date of birth: 4 November 1984 (age 42)
- Place of birth: Zürich, Switzerland
- Height: 1.80 m (5 ft 11 in)
- Position: Full back

Senior career*
Years	Team	Apps	(Gls)
2005–2006	Red Star Zürich	20	(3)
2006–2008	FC Winterthur	68	(5)
2009–2012	Lugano	95	(1)
2012–2013	FC Wohlen	11	(0)
2013–2014	FC Schaffhausen	35	(0)
2014–2016	St. Gallen	38	(0)
2016–2018	FC Aarau	48	(1)
Total		315	(10)
- * Club domestic league appearances and goals

Pascal Thrier (born 4 November 1984) is a Swiss former professional footballer who played as a full back. He spent most of his career at FC Lugano, where he made 95 appearances for the team and scored 1 goal.
