= Alexandre Morisod =

Swiss footballer (born 1967)

Personal information
- Date of birth: 8 December 1967 (age 58)
- Position: Midfielder

Senior career*
Years	Team	Apps	(Gls)
1987–1988	Servette		
1988–1992	Urania Genève Sport		
1992–2001	Étoile Carouge		
- * Club domestic league appearances and goals

Alexandre Morisod (born 8 December 1967) is a Swiss former professional footballer who played as a midfielder.
