= Jonathan Vidallé =

Argentine footballer

Personal information
- Full name: Jonathan Vidallé Calvo
- Date of birth: 13 May 1977 (age 49)
- Height: 1.83 m (6 ft 0 in)
- Position: Forward

Senior career*
Years	Team	Apps	(Gls)
1995–1996	Vélez Sarsfield		
1997	Provincial Osorno	16	(6)
1997–1998	St. Gallen	22	(8)
1998–1999	Cremonese	12	(0)
1999–2000	L'Aquila	18	(5)
2000	Rimini	7	(1)
2001	L'Aquila	3	(0)
2001	Avellino	11	(1)
2001–2003	L'Aquila	34	(5)
2003–2004	Taranto	12	(2)
2004	L'Aquila	15	(7)
2004–2005	Sambenedettese	14	(4)
2005–2006	Viterbese	12	(5)
2006	Gela	4	(0)
2006–2007	Lanciano	13	(0)
2007	Centobuchi	25	(8)
- * Club domestic league appearances and goals

Jonathan Vidallé Calvo (born 13 May 1977) is an Argentine-Chilean former professional footballer who played as a forward. Besides Argentina, he played in Switzerland and Italy.

== Career ==
A product of Vélez Sarsfield, Vidallé moved to Chilean side Provincial Osorno in 1997. After a stint with Swiss side St. Gallen, he played for several clubs in Italy in both Serie B and Serie C.

Following his retirement, he has developed a career as a scouting manager for clubs such as Arsenal in England, Parma in Italy and Boca Juniors in Argentina.

== Personal life ==
He is the son of the former Argentine international goalkeeper Enrique Vidallé and holds the Chilean nationality.
