= Martin Fryand =

Swiss footballer (born 1972)

Personal information
- Date of birth: 27 March 1972 (age 54)
- Position: Midfielder

Senior career*
Years	Team	Apps	(Gls)
1991–1995	FC Sion		
1995–1997	FC Lausanne-Sport		
1997–2003	BSC Young Boys		
2002	→ FC Sion		
2003–2007	FC Münsingen		
- * Club domestic league appearances and goals

Martin Fryand (born 27 March 1972) is a retired Swiss football midfielder.
