= Naldo (footballer, born 1976) =

Brazilian footballer

Personal information
- Full name: Ednaldo Mendes da Conceição
- Date of birth: 6 February 1976 (age 50)
- Place of birth: Rio de Janeiro, Brazil
- Height: 1.86 m (6 ft 1 in)
- Position: Forward

Youth career
- Fluminense

Senior career*
Years	Team	Apps	(Gls)
1996	Fluminense		
- Internacional
- Tubarão
2001	Trabzonspor	0	(0)
2002	FC Wil	28	(6)
2003	FC Luzern	9	(0)
2003–2004	St. Gallen	29	(2)
2005–2006	LA Galaxy	24	(1)
2006–2007	Ionikos		
2007–2008	California Cougars		
- * Club domestic league appearances and goals

Ednaldo Mendes da Conceição (born 6 February 1976), known as Naldo, is a Brazilian former professional footballer who played as a forward.

Born in Rio de Janeiro, Naldo came up through the system of hometown Fluminense in 1996. He also played for Internacional and Tubarão and had a short spell with Turkey's Galatasaray. In 2002, Naldo moved to Switzerland, where he played for FC Wil, FC Luzern, and FC St. Gallen. He signed with Major League Soccer and the Los Angeles Galaxy in 2005, but was released after a disappointing season and a single game in 2006. He switch to indoor soccer and joined California Cougars of the Major Indoor Soccer League for the 2007–08 season.
