= David Andreoli =

Swiss/Italian football midfielder (born 1982)

Personal information
- Full name: David Andreoli
- Date of birth: September 29, 1982 (age 44)
- Place of birth: Littau, Switzerland
- Height: 1.70 m (5 ft 7 in)
- Position: Midfielder

Youth career
- –1996: FC Littau
- 1996–2001: FC Luzern

Senior career*
Years	Team	Apps	(Gls)
2001–2007	FC Luzern	38	(3)
2005–2006	→ FC Lugano (loan)	15	(5)
2007–2009	SC Kriens	20	(9)
2009–2010	FC Sursee	24	(4)
2010	SC Cham	11	(0)
2010–2013	SC Buochs	39	(9)

Managerial career
- 2014-2017: SC Buochs
- 2019-: FC Littau
- * Club domestic league appearances and goals as of 25. August 2025

David Andreoli (born September 29, 1982) is a Swiss/Italian football (soccer) midfielder.

During his career, Andreoli has played for FC Luzern, FC Lugano, SC Kriens, FC Sursee, SC Cham and SC Buochs.
