= Avi Tikva =

Israeli footballer

Personal information
- Full name: Avraham Tikva
- Date of birth: 28 June 1976 (age 50)
- Place of birth: Netanya, Israel
- Position: Attacking midfielder

Youth career
- Maccabi Netanya

Senior career*
Years	Team	Apps	(Gls)
1993	Maccabi Netanya	6	(0)
1994–1995	Hapoel Kfar Saba	–	(–)
1995–1996	Maccabi Netanya	–	(–)
1996–1997	Bnei Yehuda	29	(4)
1997–2000	Grasshopper Club Zürich	93	(23)
2000–2001	Hapoel Tel Aviv	26	(4)
2001–2003	BSC Young Boys	43	(13)
2003–2004	Maccabi Petah Tikva	33	(4)
2005	Enosis Neon Paralimni FC	10	(1)
2005–2006	Hapoel Kfar Saba	19	(0)
2006–2007	Hakoah Amidar/Ramat Gan	14	(3)

International career
1992–1993	Israel U18	10	(1)
1996–1997	Israel U21	8	(1)
1998–2002	Israel	12	(1)
- * Club domestic league appearances and goals

Avraham "Avi" Tikva (Hebrew: אברהם "אבי" תקוה; born 28 June 1976) is a retired Israeli professional association footballer. He is the younger brother of former professional footballer Shalom Tikva.

== Biography ==
=== Playing career ===
During the UEFA Cup 1998–99 season with Grasshopper, Tikva was allowed to miss the match against Belgian side Anderlecht in order to observe the Jewish holiday of Yom Kippur.

== Honours ==
- Swiss National League A:
  - Winner (1): 1997–98
  - Runner-up (1): 1998–99
- Swiss Cup:
  - Runner-up (1): 1999
- Toto Cup:
  - Winner (1): 2003–04
