= Rémo Meyer =

Swiss footballer (born 1980)

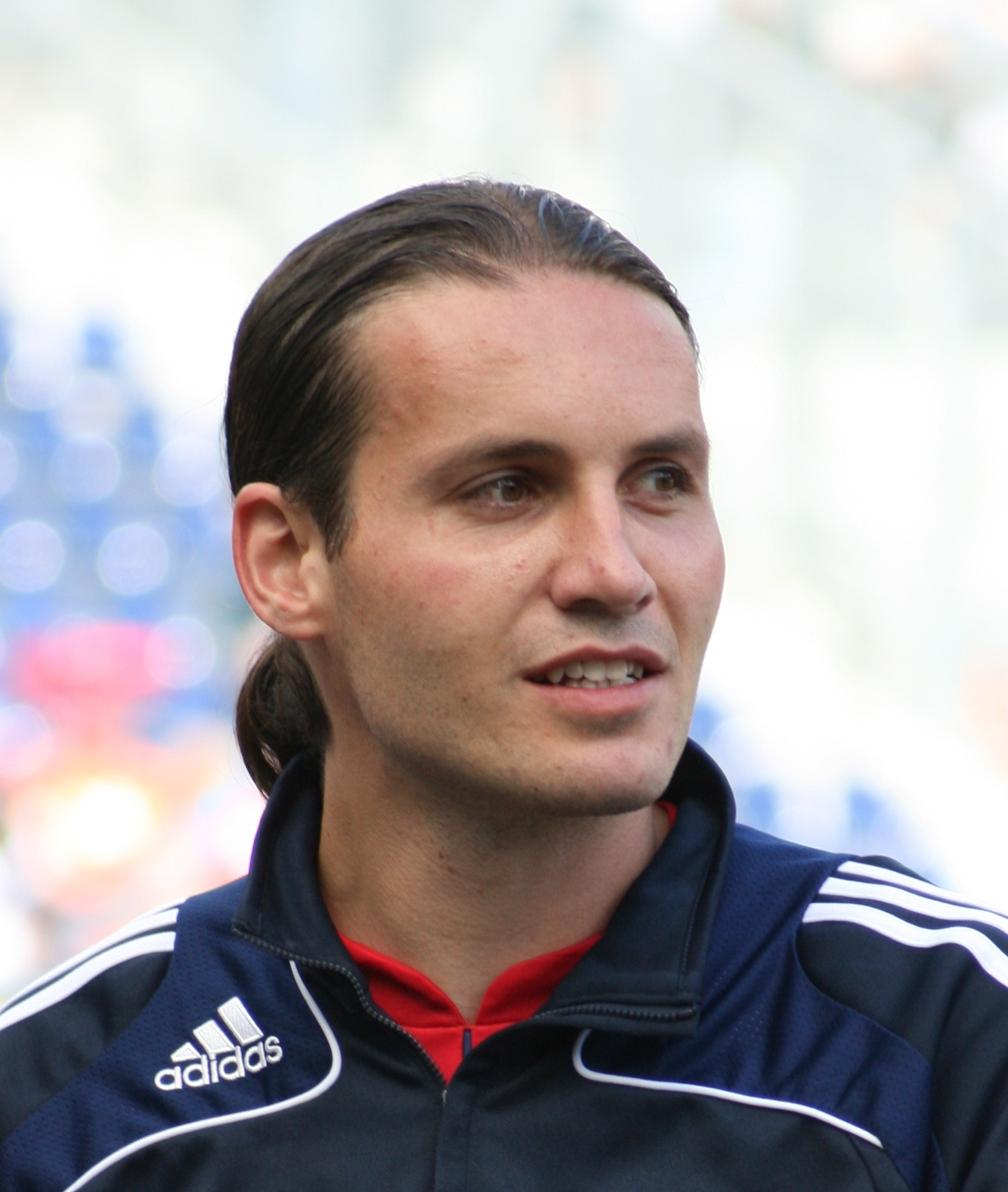
- Meyer in 2009

Personal information
- Date of birth: 12 November 1980 (age 45)
- Place of birth: Langenthal, Switzerland
- Height: 1.83 m (6 ft 0 in)
- Position: Right-back

Senior career*
Years	Team	Apps	(Gls)
1997–2000	FC Luzern	37	(1)
2000–2002	Lausanne Sport	64	(4)
2002–2006	1860 Munich	86	(2)
2006–2009	Red Bull Salzburg	45	(2)
Total		232	(9)

International career
2002–2004	Switzerland	5	(0)
- * Club domestic league appearances and goals

Rémo Meyer (born 12 November 1980) is a Swiss former professional footballer who played as a right-back. He currently serves as director of football for Swiss Super League club FC Luzern.

== International career ==
He has five caps for the Switzerland national football team.

== Personal life ==
Meyer's son, Leny Meyer, is a professional footballer currently under contract with german 3. Liga club VfB Stuttgart II, after joining them from FC Luzern.
