= FC Hochdorf =

Swiss football club

- Full name: Fussballclub Hochdorf
- Founded: 12 March 1921
- Ground: Hochdorf, Lucerne, Switzerland
- Capacity: 2515
- Coach: Erwin Stalder
- League: Regional liga Innerschweiz
- 2008/2009: 2nd

FC Hochdorf is a Swiss football club. It currently compete at Regional Verbaende of Innerschweizerischer Fussballverband group (5th level).

== History ==
Hochdorf played at 2. Liga interregional between 2000 and 2004.

== Staff and board members ==
- Trainer: Rémo Meyer
- Goalkeeper Coach: Patrick Pfrunder
- Physio: Roger Schwendener
- President: Lisbeth Schwegler
- Vice President: Marcel Villiger
- Secretary : Andreas Unternährer
- Treasurer : Andreas Fecker
