= Stade des Arbères =

Football stadium in Meyrin, Switzerland

- Interactive map of Stade des Arbères
- Address: CHE
- Location: Meyrin, Switzerland
- Capacity: 2,800

Construction
- Opened: 2008

Tenant
- Meyrin FC

Stade des Arbères is a football stadium located in Meyrin, near Geneva, Switzerland. It was opened in late May 2008 and has a capacity of 2,800 spectators. The stadium is home to the Meyrin FC football club.

The stadium was built next to the Stade du Bois-Carré, where Meyrin FC used to play before the new venue opened. On 3 June 2014, Stade des Arbères hosted a friendly international football match between the national teams of the United Arab Emirates and Georgia, with the UAE winning 1–0.
