= FC Bülach =

Swiss football club

- Full name: Football Club Bülach
- Founded: 1917
- Ground: Stadion Erachfeld
- Capacity: 3500
- Chairman: Schädeli Armin
- Coach: Di Muro Michelino
- League: 2. Liga
- 2010/2011: Currently 14th

FC Buelach are a football team from Switzerland who played in the 2L Inter Group 4 2008–2009, currently in the 2. Liga.

== Current squad ==
Note: Flags indicate national team as defined under FIFA eligibility rules; some limited exceptions apply. Players may hold more than one non-FIFA nationality.

No.	Pos.	Nation	Player
1	GK	(Italy) ITA	Pietro Padula
2	DF	(Switzerland) SUI	Cyrill Thrier
3	DF	(Switzerland) SUI	Ronald Marsella
4	DF	(Switzerland) SUI	Stephan Biber
5	MF	(Switzerland) SUI	Gianluca Bortoluzzi
8	MF	(Switzerland) SUI	Gianluca Appassito
9	FW	(Dominican Republic) DOM	Manauri Medina
10	MF	(Nigeria) NGA	Anthony Adeyemi
11	MF	(Switzerland) SUI	Bekim Bushati
12	GK	(Switzerland) SUI	Christian Zurfluh
13	MF	(Turkey) TUR	Sagsan Apaydin

No.	Pos.	Nation	Player
14	MF	(Switzerland) SUI	Mladen Savic
15	DF	(Kosovo) KOS	Mehmet Dagli
16	MF	(Switzerland) SUI	Brian Tanner
18	FW	(Kosovo) KOS	Shkelzen Iseni
19	DF	(Switzerland) SUI	Daniel Scherrer
20	FW	(Italy) ITA	Alessandro Salluce
21	FW	(Switzerland) SUI	Matthias Biber
23	MF	(Switzerland) SUI	Nenad Simeonovic
25	MF	(Switzerland) SUI	Sebastian Bradford
26	DF	(Switzerland) SUI	Martin Hirt

== Staff and board members ==
- Manager : Daniel Bernhardsgrütter
- Assistant Trainer : Daniel Bernauer
- Goalkeeper coach: Reto Lopefe
- Club doctor : Mario Schiavi
- Groundsman : Slavisa Simijonovic
- Honorary President : Heinz Lieb
- Honorary President : Edi Koller
