= Sportanlage Stapfen =

Stadium in Naters, Switzerland

Sportanlage Stapfen is a stadium in Naters, Switzerland. It is currently used for football matches and is the home ground of FC Naters. The capacity is 3,000. The stadium was opened in 1997.
