= FC Meyrin =

Swiss football club

Meyrin FC
- Full name: Meyrin Football Club
- Founded: 1 July 1914; 112 years ago
- Ground: Stade des Arbères; Meyrin, Switzerland
- Capacity: 2,018
- Chairman: Antoine Salamolard
- Manager: Domingos Ribeiro
- League: 1. Liga Classic
- 2024–25: Group 1, 3rd of 16
Home colours	Away colours

Meyrin Football Club is a football team based in Meyrin in Switzerland. They currently play in the 1. Liga Classic, the fourth tier of the Swiss football pyramid.

Meyrin were promoted to 1. Liga in summer 1995. In summer 1996 Meyrin were promoted to Nationalliga B and returned to 1. Liga in the following summer. Meyrin were promoted again in 2003 until relegated again in 2006.

== Crest ==
Former logo (–2017)

Meyrin FC change logo from 2017–18 season color is black yellow.

== Managers ==
Years	Manager	Nation
1955–65	Marcel Gander	(Switzerland)
1965–66	Louis Thomas	(Switzerland)
1966–68	Robert Dupuis	(Switzerland)
1968–71	André Grobety	(Switzerland)
1971–73	Claude Martin	(Switzerland)
1973–75	André Bosson	(Switzerland)
1975	Jean-Claude Schindelholz	(Switzerland)
1975–80	Franz Barriquand	(Switzerland)
1980–82	Roger Guinand	(Switzerland)
1982–84	Edmond Sauthier	(Switzerland)
1984–85	Christian Coste	(France)
1985–86	Jean-Charles Martak	(Switzerland)
1986–87	Edmond Sauthier	(Switzerland)
1987–88	Gilbert Cottier	(Switzerland)
1988–89	Christian Coste	(France)
1989–91	Edmond Viros	(Switzerland)
1991–93	Alberto Porto	(Switzerland)
1993–96	Gérard Castella	(Switzerland)
1996–99	Pascal Besnard	(Switzerland)
1999-01	Oscar Gissi	(Argentina)
2001	Claude-Alain Fontaine	(Switzerland)
2001–02	Pascal Besnard	(Switzerland)
2002–05	Jean-Michel Abey	(Switzerland)
2005–06	Adrian Ursea	(Romania)
2005–06	Claude-Alain Fontaine	(Switzerland)
2005–06	Diego Sessolo	(Italy)
2006–08	Domingos Ribeiro	(Portugal) (France)
2008–12	Hervé Musquère	(France)
2012–14	Bruno Codeas	(Portugal) (Switzerland)
2014–15	Carlos Alves	(Portugal)
2015–23	Jean-Philippe Lebeau	(France)
2023–	Domingos Ribeiro	(Portugal) (France)

== Current squad ==
As of 10 April, 2026. Note: Flags indicate national team as defined under FIFA eligibility rules; some limited exceptions apply. Players may hold more than one non-FIFA nationality.

No.	Pos.	Nation	Player
1	GK	SUI	Hassan Taleb
3	DF	FRA	Paul Mory Chanut
5	DF	SUI	Tiago Vilaranda
6	MF	POR	Pedro Rosende
8	MF	POR	Bruno Da Silva
9	FW	SUI	Christopher Nwanne
10	FW	SUI	Leo Gomez
11	FW	SUI	Milan Reymond
12	GK	SUI	Axel Geiser
17	MF	SUI	David Goncalves
19	FW	SUI	Mathieu Vonnez

No.	Pos.	Nation	Player
21	DF	SUI	Raiyan Puntel
22	DF	POR	Timo Ribeiro
23	DF	FRA	Daniel Titié
26	MF	SUI	Sinclair Baddy Dega
27	MF	SUI	Elisio Antunes
30	DF	SUI	Diego Trillo
33	MF	SUI	Arsim Rexhepi
34	DF	LIE	Emanuel Zünd
37	FW	ITA	Javier Conforto
47	DF	ITA	Nabil Arrob
88	FW	SUI	Saikou Njie
