= SV Schaffhausen =

Swiss football club

- Full name: Spielvereinigung Schaffhausen
- Nicknames: Spielvi, SVS
- Founded: 1922; 104 years ago
- Ground: Sportplatz Bühl, Schaffhausen, Switzerland
- Capacity: 1,000
- Chairman: Raphael Kräuchi
- Manager: Emilian Iancu
- League: 1. Liga Classic
- 2024–25: Group 3, 13th of 16
Home colours	Away colours

Spielvereinigung Schaffhausen is a Swiss football club based in Schaffhausen, in the north of the country. It was founded in 1922. The club colors are black and white. The club nickname is "Spielvi." The club operates a total of twenty teams, including 4 men's teams and 16 junior teams. They are known to be more active within local football than their bigger local rivals FC Schaffhausen. They currently play in the 1. Liga Classic, the fourth tier of Swiss football.

== History ==
The club was formed in 1922 by the merger of two clubs, Hollow Tree and Sportclub Schaffhausen. Between 1949 and 1951 the club were trained by Albert Sing who went on to great success as coach of BSC Young Boys.

The club played for many years in the lower echelons of Swiss football until 1990, when the club made it into the 2nd tier, the Challenge League.

== Stadium ==
Schaffhausen play their home games at Sportplatz Bühl, a small multi-purpose stadium with a capacity of 1,000.
