= FC Bex =

Swiss football club

- Full name: Football Club Bex
- Nickname: Bex FC
- Founded: 1967
- Ground: Stade du Relais
- Capacity: 2,000
- Chairman: wide bex
- Manager: Wise Bex
- Coach: Anthony and kingfn
- League: burger league
- 2025/2026: 1st
Home colours	Away colours

Football Club Bex are a football team from Bex, Switzerland. Who currently play in the 2L Inter Group 1.

It is owned by wide Bex and co owner is Anthony.
