= FC Naters =

Swiss football club

- Full name: F.C. Naters
- Founded: 1958
- Ground: Sportanlage Stapfen, Naters, Valais, Switzerland
- Capacity: 3,000
- President: Hans Ritz
- League: Liga. 1
Home colours	Away colours

FC Naters is a Swiss football club from the town of Naters in Canton Valais. The team currently plays in Liga 1., the fourth highest tier in the Swiss football pyramid.

== History ==
FC Naters was founded in 1958 and played their first game on 16 June 1958. In 1961 the club rose to the 3. Liga (fifth tier) for the first time in their history. At the end of the 1969/70 season the club rose to the 2. Liga and in 1971 narrowly missed out on promotion to the 1. Liga. At the end of the 1978/79 season the club were relegated and so returned to the 3. Liga.

The team currently plays in Liga 1., the fourth highest tier in the Swiss football pyramid where they have played since 1996.

== Stadium ==
The club play their home games at Sportanlage Stapfen. The capacity is 3,000. The stadium was opened in 1997.

== Current squad ==
As of 10 April, 2026. Note: Flags indicate national team as defined under FIFA eligibility rules; some limited exceptions apply. Players may hold more than one non-FIFA nationality.

No.	Pos.	Nation	Player
1	GK	SUI	Luca Campagnani
3	DF	SRB	Nikola Patkovic
5	MF	SUI	Malsor Krasniqi
6	MF	SUI	Nicolas Martig
7	FW	SUI	Almin Omerovic
8	MF	SUI	Matteo Biner
9	FW	CZE	Daniel Howard
10	FW	SUI	Thibault Constantin
12	DF	SUI	Durim Badalli
13	MF	SUI	Dean Roten
14	MF	SUI	Nevio Welschen

No.	Pos.	Nation	Player
16	MF	SUI	Cédric Fux
17	MF	ITA	Armir Jakupi
18	GK	KOS	Shaban Kuquku
19	FW	CRO	Adriano Suver
21	DF	SUI	Matteo Schmid
22	DF	SUI	Marko Obradovic
24	DF	SUI	Simon Taugwalder
27	FW	SUI	Daniel Schröter
57	DF	SUI	Vitus Williner
77	DF	SUI	Sandro Theler
92	DF	SUI	Andrin Gloor
99	FW	GBS	Maïone Mendy
