= FC Serrières =

Swiss football club

- Full name: FC Serrières Neuchâtel
- Founded: 1951
- Dissolved: 2013; 13 years ago
- Ground: Pierre-à-Bot; Neuchâtel
- Capacity: 1,700
- League: 2. Liga Interregional
Home colours	Away colours

FC Serrières was a football club from Neuchâtel, Switzerland that was founded in 1951 and merged with Neuchâtel Xamax in 2013 to form Neuchâtel Xamax FCS. It most recently played in the 2. Liga Interregional before the merger.

== Players ==
The last squad of FC Serrières at the time of its 2013 merger is as follows.

Note: Flags indicate national team as defined under FIFA eligibility rules; some limited exceptions apply. Players may hold more than one non-FIFA nationality.

No.	Pos.	Nation	Player
1	GK	FRA	Maxime Brenet
2	DF	SUI	Pascal Oppliger
3	DF	SUI	Loris Pisanello
4	DF	SUI	Jean-Léon Bart
5	DF	SUI	Thomas Bühler
6	MF	BRA	Juninho
7	MF	SUI	Pascal Maire
8	DF	SUI	Marco Pinto
9	FW	SUI	Damien Greub
10	MF	SUI	Giona Preisig

No.	Pos.	Nation	Player
11	MF	POR	Hélder Pinheiro Amorim
12	FW	FRA	Yassine El Allaoui
13	MF	SUI	Luc Robert
14	MF	BRA	Matheus José dos Reis Oliva
16	MF	SUI	Micael Nascimento
17	MF	TUN	Hamza Aouachri
21	FW	SUI	Dominique Coelho
23	MF	SUI	Michael Tortella
25	DF	SUI	Adam El-Hamadeh
