= FC Colombier =

Swiss football club

- Full name: Football Club Colombier
- Founded: 1923
- Ground: Stade des Chézards
- Capacity: 2500
- Chairman: Edio Calani
- Coach: Claude Christen
- Website: http://www.fc-colombier.ch

FC Colombier are a football team from Colombier, Switzerland who are currently playing in the 2L Inter Group 1 2009–10.

FC Colombier's traditional kit colours are red-and-white shirts, with shorts and white socks.

== Current squad ==
Note: Flags indicate national team as defined under FIFA eligibility rules; some limited exceptions apply. Players may hold more than one non-FIFA nationality.

No.	Pos.	Nation	Player
—	GK	SUI	Tim Walker
—	GK	BIH	Almir Samardzic
—	DF	SUI	Raphael Forestier
—	DF	SUI	Jérôme Cochand
—	DF	SUI	Karel Manrau
—	DF	POR	Filipe Andrade
—	DF	SUI	Stéphane Steiner
—	DF	SUI	Gilles Faivre
—	DF	POR	Daniel Fernandes
—	MF	POR	Hugo Melo Costa

No.	Pos.	Nation	Player
—	MF	SUI	Patrick Calani
—	MF	MKD	Toni Apostoloski
—	MF	POR	Alex Santos
—	MF	SUI	Bujar Haziri
—	MF	SUI	Francisco Basilis
—	MF	TUR	Mustafa Ongu
—	MF	POR	Patrick Navalho
—	FW	POR	Yannick Da Costa
—	FW	CMR	Yannick Zengue
—	FW	BIH	Emir Samardzic
