= SC Bümpliz 78 =

Swiss football club

- Full name: Sports Club Bümpliz 78
- Founded: 1978
- Ground: Bodenweid
- Capacity: 4000
- Coach: Daniel Aebi
- 2008–09: 8th

SC Bümpliz 78 is a football team from Switzerland which plays in the 2L Interregional Group 2.

== Current squad ==
Note: Flags indicate national team as defined under FIFA eligibility rules; some limited exceptions apply. Players may hold more than one non-FIFA nationality.

No.	Pos.	Nation	Player
1		SUI	Marc Pfister
2		SUI	Pascal Kropf
3		SUI	Andi Balmer
4		SUI	Jam Kamarys
5		SUI	Bajram Avdiji
6		SUI	Mischa Hollinger
8		SUI	Christian Ambord
11		SUI	Marius Wagner
12		SUI	Dany Blank
14		SUI	Renato Hausler

No.	Pos.	Nation	Player
15		SUI	Mario Sele
16		SUI	Michael Wyss
17		SUI	Raphael Walther
18		SUI	Tommy Neuenschwander
19		SUI	Fabian Seiler
20		SUI	Ronny Schmidt
21		SUI	Joel Hubscher
22		SUI	Joel Nissille
23		SUI	Christian Kung
