= FC Freienbach =

Swiss football club

- Full name: Football Club Freienbach
- Founded: 1965; 61 years ago
- Ground: Chrummen, Freienbach
- Capacity: 4,500
- Chairman: Benjamin Fuchs
- Manager: Stefan Flühmann
- League: 1. Liga Classic
- 2024–25: Group 3, 12th of 16

FC Freienbach is a Swiss football club from Freienbach, Canton of Schwyz. The team currently plays in 1. Liga Classic, the fourth tier in the Swiss football pyramid.

== History ==
The club was formed in 1965.

They finished 2020–21 season in 1st position (2. Liga Interregional).

== Current squad ==
As of 6 April, 2026. Note: Flags indicate national team as defined under FIFA eligibility rules; some limited exceptions apply. Players may hold more than one non-FIFA nationality.

No.	Pos.	Nation	Player
1	GK	SUI	Leon Merkas
2	MF	SUI	Benjamin Tritten
3	DF	SUI	Simon Rohrbach
4	DF	SUI	Egzon Kllokoqi
5	MF	SUI	Dario Marcon
6	MF	SUI	Kenith Catari
7	FW	POR	Claudio Teixeira
8	MF	SUI	Alessandro Sabino
9	FW	BIH	Kemil Festić
10	MF	SUI	Nikolaj Gavric
11	FW	SUI	Lendrit Dellova
13	MF	SUI	Dženan Talić
14	FW	ITA	Giuseppe Giordano
15	DF	SUI	Silvan Gönitzer (captain)

No.	Pos.	Nation	Player
16	MF	SUI	Samuel Heini
17	MF	SUI	Leon Hajrizi
18	MF	SUI	Luca Straub
20	MF	SUI	Silas Morf
21	DF	SUI	Rino Maggio
22	GK	SUI	Raoul Perenzin
23	DF	ITA	Alessio Stumpo
24	MF	RWA	Espoir Niyo
25	MF	ESP	Zidane Vaz
26	GK	SUI	Dominic Haldemann
27	MF	SUI	Jérôme Stähli
29	FW	GHA	Joshua Gasane
33	DF	LIE	Maximilian Göppel
