= FC Red Star Zürich =

Swiss football club

Red Star
- Full name: Football Club Red Star Zürich
- Founded: 1905; 121 years ago
- Ground: Allmend Brunau, Zürich
- Capacity: 2,000
- Chairman: Marcel Cornioley
- Manager: Jérôme Oswald
- League: 2. Liga Interregional
Home colours	Away colours

FC Red Star Zürich is a football club from Zürich, Switzerland and currently play in the 2. Liga Interregional, the fifth tier of Swiss football.

Red Star based its identity on values and practices of amateur sports and became one of the most prolific top amateur clubs in Switzerland, ranking as number 2 in the all-time table of the 1. Liga.
