= 2005–06 Swiss 1. Liga =

1. Liga
- Season: 2005–06
- Champions: Group 1: Servette; Group 2: Biel-Bienne; Group 3: Tuggen
- Promoted: Servette; Delémont
- Relegated: Group 1: Signal Bernex; Grand-Lancy; Group 2: Schötz; Buochs; Group 3: Altstetten; Frauenfeld
- Matches: 720 + 12

The 2005–06 Swiss 1. Liga was the 74th season of this league and was, at this time, the third tier of the Swiss football league system. The 1. Liga was the highest level of amateur football, although an ever-increasing number of teams had professional or semi-professional players in their ranks, this also included the U-21 teams, the eldest youth teams of the professional clubs.

== Format ==
There were 48 teams in this division this season, including eight U-21 teams which were the eldest youth teams of the professional clubs in the Super League and the Challenge League. The 1. Liga was divided into three regional groups, each with 16 teams. Within each group, the teams would play a double round-robin to decide their positions in the league. The three groups winners and three runners-up, together with the two best third placed teams, then contested a play-off for the two promotion slots. The U-21 teams were not eligible for promotion and could not compete the play-offs. The two last placed teams in each group were relegated to the 2. Liga Interregional.

== Group 1 ==
Last season's group winners Lausanne-Sport had achieved promotion to the second tier. Further, ES FC Malley and Stade Lausanne Ouchy had been relegated and were no longer represented in this division. New clubs in this season were Signal FC Bernex-Confignon and SC Düdingen who had both been promoted after winning their 2. Liga Interregional groups. FC Bulle joined the group after being relegated following the 2004–05 Challenge League season. Also new to the group was Servette. During February 2005, the parent company of the club was declared bankrupt and as a consequence their U-21 team took over the club name playing two divisions below the original Servette team.

=== Teams ===
Club	Canton	Stadium	Capacity
FC Bex	Vaud	Relais	2,000
FC Bulle	Fribourg	Stade de Bouleyres	7,000
Étoile Carouge FC	Geneva	Stade de la Fontenette	3,690
CS Chênois	Geneva	Stade des Trois-Chêne	8,000
SC Düdingen	Fribourg	Stadion Birchhölzli	3,000
FC Echallens	Vaud	Sportplatz 3 Sapins	2,000
FC Fribourg	Fribourg	Stade Universitaire	9,000
Grand-Lancy FC	Geneva	Stade de Marignac	1,500
FC Martigny-Sports	Valais	Stade d'Octodure	2,500
ES FC Malley	Vaud	Centre Sportif de la Tuilière	1,500
FC Naters	Valais	Sportanlage Stapfen	3,000
FC Stade Nyonnais	Vaud	Stade de Colovray	7,200
FC Serrières	Neuchâtel	Pierre-à-Bot	1,700
Servette FC	Geneva	Stade de Genève	30,084
Signal FC Bernex-Confignon	Geneva	Stade municipal de Bernex	1,000
Urania Genève Sport	Geneva	Stade de Frontenex	4,000

=== Final league table ===
Pos	Team	Pld	W	D	L	GF	GA	GD	Pts	Qualification or relegation
1	Servette FC	30	21	5	4	82	32	+50	68	Play-off to Challenge League
2	Étoile Carouge FC	30	16	8	6	66	27	+39	56	Play-off to Challenge League
3	Urania Genève Sport	30	16	7	7	55	39	+16	55	Play-off to Challenge League
4	ES FC Malley	30	16	6	8	61	34	+27	54	
5	FC Stade Nyonnais	30	14	6	10	57	51	+6	48	
6	FC Echallens	30	11	11	8	47	43	+4	44	
7	CS Chênois	30	11	8	11	50	54	−4	41	
8	FC Bulle	30	11	7	12	46	50	−4	40	
9	FC Fribourg	30	9	12	9	50	48	+2	39	
10	FC Serrières	30	9	11	10	33	33	0	38	
11	FC Martigny-Sports	30	10	7	13	40	50	−10	37	
12	FC Bex	30	10	7	13	39	56	−17	37	
13	SC Düdingen	30	8	7	15	41	65	−24	31	
14	FC Naters	30	7	7	16	42	60	−18	28	
15	Signal FC Bernex-Confignon	30	3	12	15	37	62	−25	21	Relegation to 2. Liga Interregional
16	Grand-Lancy FC	30	4	7	19	30	72	−42	19	Relegation to 2. Liga Interregional

Source: Erste Liga official website
Rules for classification: 1) Points; 2) Goal difference; 3) Goals scored; 4) Play-off

== Group 2 ==
Last season's bottom two clubs FC Alle and FC Langenthal had suffered relegation. They were replaced by FC Kickers Luzern and SV Muttenz who had both been promoted after winning their 2. Liga Interregional groups respectively. FC Laufen were also promoted after being the best second placed team. Last season's group champions FC Biel-Bienne had missed promotion and remained in the group.

=== Teams ===
Club	Canton	Stadium	Capacity
Basel U-21	Basel-City	Stadion Rankhof or Leichtathletik-Stadion St. Jakob	7,000; 4,000
FC Biel-Bienne	Bern	Gurzelen Stadion	5,500
SC Buochs	Nidwalden	Stadion Seefeld	5,000
SR Delémont	Jura	La Blancherie	5,263
SC Dornach	Solothurn	Gigersloch	2,500
FC Grenchen	Solothurn	Stadium Brühl	15,100
FC Kickers Luzern	Lucerne	Stadion Auf Tribschen	2,950
FC Laufen	Basel-Country	Sportplatz Nau	3,000
Luzern U-21	Lucerne	Stadion Allmend or Allmend Süd	13,000; 2,000
FC Münsingen	Bern	Sportanlage Sandreutenen	1,400
SV Muttenz	Basel-Country	Sportplatz Margelacker	3,200
FC Schötz	Lucerne	Sportplatz Wissenhusen	1,750
FC Solothurn	Solothurn	Stadion FC Solothurn	6,750
FC Wangen bei Olten	Solothurn	Sportplatz Chrüzmatt	3,000
Young Boys U-21	Bern	Stadion Wankdorf or Allmend Bern	32,000; 2,000
SC Zofingen	Aargau	Sportanlagen Trinermatten	2,000

=== Final league table ===
Pos	Team	Pld	W	D	L	GF	GA	GD	Pts	Qualification or relegation
1	FC Biel-Bienne	30	20	8	2	65	20	+45	68	Play-off to Challenge League
2	SR Delémont	30	14	10	6	56	40	+16	52	Play-off to Challenge League
3	Basel U-21	30	14	7	9	78	48	+30	49	
4	FC Kickers Luzern	30	13	10	7	49	41	+8	49	
5	FC Solothurn	30	12	10	8	51	40	+11	46	
6	SC Zofingen	30	10	10	10	52	55	−3	40	
7	FC Grenchen	30	9	11	10	51	46	+5	38	
8	FC Wangen bei Olten	30	10	8	12	51	55	−4	38	
9	FC Laufen	30	9	9	12	37	45	−8	36	
10	Young Boys U-21	30	8	11	11	44	45	−1	35	
11	FC Münsingen	30	7	14	9	37	42	−5	35	
12	SC Dornach	30	10	5	15	42	63	−21	35	
13	SV Muttenz	30	9	8	13	43	67	−24	35	
14	Luzern U-21	30	8	10	12	45	53	−8	34	
15	FC Schötz	30	7	10	13	46	64	−18	31	Relegation to 2. Liga Interregional
16	SC Buochs	30	5	9	16	39	62	−23	24	Relegation to 2. Liga Interregional

Source: Erste Liga official website
Rules for classification: 1) Points; 2) Goal difference; 3) Goals scored; 4) Head-to-head points; 5) Away goals scored; 6) Draw.

== Group 3 ==
Last season's bottom two clubs FC Chur 97 and FC Gossau had suffered relegation. Last season's group winners FC Tuggen had missed promotion and remained in the group. However runner's-up Locarno had achieved promotion, winning the play-offs. Theses teams were replaced by FC Rapperswil-Jona who had been promoted after winning the 2. Liga Interregional group 5 the previous season. Further new to this group were SC Cham and Zug 94 who had played the previous season in group two.

=== Teams ===
Club	Canton	Stadium	Capacity
FC Altstetten	Zürich	Buchlern	1,000
GC Biaschesi	Ticino	Campo Sportivo "Al Vallone"	2,850
FC Brugg	Aargau	Stadion Au	3,300
SC Cham	Zug	Stadion Eizmoos	1,800
FC Frauenfeld	Thurgau	Kleine Allmend	6,370
Grasshopper Club U-21	Zürich	GC/Campus Niederhasli	2,000
FC Herisau	Appenzell Ausserrhoden	Ebnet	2,000
FC Kreuzlingen	Thurgau	Sportplatz Hafenareal	1,200
FC Mendrisio	Ticino	Centro Sportivo Comunale	4,000
FC Rapperswil-Jona	St. Gallen	Stadion Grünfeld	2,500
FC Red Star Zürich	Zürich	Allmend Brunau	2,000
FC Seefeld Zürich	Zürich	Sportanlage Lengg	1,000
St. Gallen U-21	St. Gallen	Espenmoos	11,000
FC Tuggen	Schwyz	Linthstrasse	2,800
Zug 94	Zug	Herti Allmend Stadion	6,000
Zürich U-21	Zürich	Sportplatz Heerenschürli	1,120

=== Final league table ===
Pos	Team	Pld	W	D	L	GF	GA	GD	Pts	Qualification or relegation
1	FC Tuggen	30	21	4	5	76	35	+41	67	Play-off to Challenge League
2	FC Red Star Zürich	30	16	8	6	57	41	+16	56	Play-off to Challenge League
3	FC Herisau	30	15	8	7	55	32	+23	53	Play-off to Challenge League
4	FC Kreuzlingen	30	15	5	10	49	44	+5	50	
5	Zürich U-21	30	13	10	7	52	32	+20	49	
6	Zug 94	30	14	7	9	67	57	+10	49	
7	Grasshopper Club U-21	30	13	6	11	60	41	+19	45	
8	FC Seefeld Zürich	30	12	7	11	42	41	+1	43	
9	GC Biaschesi	30	12	5	13	44	49	−5	41	
10	SC Cham	30	10	10	10	50	49	+1	40	
11	FC Brugg	30	11	6	13	37	39	−2	39	
12	FC Rapperswil-Jona	30	10	6	14	46	55	−9	36	
13	St. Gallen U-21	30	9	7	14	44	52	−8	34	
14	FC Mendrisio	30	8	10	12	35	49	−14	34	
15	FC Altstetten	30	6	6	18	36	74	−38	24	Relegation to 2. Liga Interregional
16	FC Frauenfeld	30	1	3	26	29	89	−60	6	Relegation to 2. Liga Interregional

Source: Erste Liga official website
Rules for classification: 1) Points; 2) Goal difference; 3) Goals scored; 4) Head-to-head points; 5) Away goals scored; 6) Draw.

== Promotion play-off ==
=== Qualification round ===
Team 1	Score	Team 2
Herisau	1–3	Servette
Servette	3–0	Herisau

Servette win 6–1 on aggregate

Team 1	Score	Team 2
Delémont	3–0	Tuggen
Tuggen	0–4	Delémont

Delémont win 7–0 on aggregate

Team 1	Score	Team 2
Red Star	1–0	Étoile Carouge
Étoile Carouge	4–1	Red Star

Étoile Carouge win 4–2 on aggregate

Team 1	Score	Team 2
UGS	2–0	Biel-Bienne
Biel-Bienne	3–1	UGS

3–3 on aggregate UGS win on away goals

=== Final round ===
Team 1	Score	Team 2
Delémont	1–0	Étoile Carouge
Étoile Carouge	1–1	Delémont

Delémont win 2–1 on aggregate and are promoted to the 2006–07 Challenge League.

Team 1	Score	Team 2
UGS	0–3	Servette
Servette	2–1	UGS

Servette win 5–1 on aggregate and are promoted to the 2006–07 Challenge League.

== Summary ==
Group 1 champions were Servette, who also achieved promotion in the play-off finals. Runners-up in this group were UGS, who missed their promotion attempt, being defeated by Servette in this play-off final. Group 2 champions were Biel-Bienne and runners-up were Delémont, who had been relegated two season before. Biel-Bienne failed in their promotion attempt, but Delémont achieved promotion winning against group 1 third placed team Étoile Carouge in the finals. In group 3 champions Tuggen, runners-up Red Star and third placed Herisau all failed in the play-off qualification. From group 1 Signal FC Bernex-Confignon and Grand-Lancy FC were relegated. From group 2 FC Schötz and SC Buochs and from group 3 FC Altstetten and FC Frauenfeld also suffered the same fate and continued the next season in the 2. Liga Interregional.

The remaining teams in the 1. Liga were to be joined in next season by Sion U-21, FC La Tour/Le Pâquier, FC Mendrisio-Stabio, FC Olten and FC Gossau, all of whom had won their 2. Liga Interregional groups. Winterthur U-21 as best second placed team also achieved promotion.

== See also ==
- 2005–06 Swiss Super League
- 2005–06 Swiss Challenge League
- 2005–06 Swiss Cup

== Sources ==
- Switzerland 2005/06 at RSSSF
- Season 2005–06 at the official website

Preceded by 2004–05	Seasons in Swiss 1. Liga	Succeeded by 2006–07
