= 2003–04 Swiss 1. Liga =

1. Liga
- Season: 2003–04
- Champions: Group 1: Étoile Carouge; Group 2: Young Fellows Juventus; Group 3: Locarno
- Promoted: Young Fellows Juventus; Baulmes
- Relegated: Group 1: FC Sierre; Vevey Sports; Group 2: FC Colombier; Group 3: SC Zofingen; SV Schaffhausen
- Matches: once 210 and twice 240 plus 12 play-offs plus 2 play-outs total 704

The 2003–04 Swiss 1. Liga was the 72nd season of this league since its creation in 1931 and, at this time, it was the third tier of the Swiss football league system. The 1. Liga was also the highest level of amateur football, even though there was an ever-increasing number of clubs in this league that played with professional or semi-professional players in their ranks, not just the U-21 teams of the professional clubs.

== Format ==
There were 48 teams in this division this season, including seven U-21 teams, which were the eldest youth teams of the professional clubs in the Super League and the Challenge League. The 1. Liga was divided into three regional groups, each with 16 teams. Within each group, the teams would play a double round-robin to decide their positions in the league. The three group winners and the three runners-up, together with the two best third placed teams, then contested a play-off for the two promotion slots. The U-21 teams were not eligible for promotion and could not compete the play-offs. The two last placed teams in each group were to be relegated to the 2. Liga Interregional.

In advance of this season, FC Sion had been denied a licence by the Swiss Football Association (ASF-SFV) for the 2003–04 Challenge League and were, therefore, demoted to the amateur level. The club contested this in the courts and on 29 October 2003 the court decided how to settle this matter. Due to the settlement decision, the ASF-SFV were forced to withdraw the club from this division and to admit them to the Challenge League, the next highest tier. From this moment, group 1 continued with just 15 teams and all results of the matches with Sion were voided. Due to this decision only five teams from this level were then to be relegated, to re-increase the competition back to the original 48 teams.

== Group 1 ==
=== Teams ===
Club	Canton	Stadium	Capacity
FC Baulmes	Vaud	Stade Sous-Ville	2,500
FC Bex	Vaud	Relais	2,000
FC Echallens	Vaud	Sportplatz 3 Sapins	2,000
Étoile Carouge FC	Geneva	Stade de la Fontenette	3,690
CS Chênois	Geneva	Stade des Trois-Chêne	8,000
FC Fribourg	Fribourg	Stade Universitaire	9,000
Grand-Lancy FC	Geneva	Stade de Marignac	1,500
ES FC Malley	Vaud	Centre Sportif de la Tuilière	1,500
FC Martigny-Sports	Valais	Stade d'Octodure	2,500
FC Naters	Valais	Sportanlage Stapfen	3,000
FC Sion	Valais	Stade de Tourbillon	20,200
FC Stade Lausanne Ouchy	Vaud	Centre sportif de Vidy	1,000
FC Stade Nyonnais	Vaud	Stade de Colovray	7,200
Servette U-21	Geneva	Stade de Genève	30,084
FC Sierre	Valais	Complexe Ecossia	2,000
Vevey Sports	Vaud	Stade de Copet	4,000

=== Final league table ===
Pos	Team	Pld	W	D	L	GF	GA	GD	Pts	Qualification or relegation
1	Étoile Carouge FC	28	21	4	3	58	18	+40	67	Play-off to Challenge League
2	FC Baulmes	28	19	2	7	63	32	+31	59	Play-off to Challenge League
3	ES FC Malley	28	16	8	4	67	40	+27	56	Play-off to Challenge League
4	FC Martigny-Sports	28	15	8	5	52	25	+27	53	
5	CS Chênois	28	14	4	10	54	51	+3	46	
6	Servette U-21	28	10	5	13	36	45	−9	35	
7	FC Fribourg	28	9	8	11	42	53	−11	35	
8	FC Naters	28	9	8	11	35	49	−14	35	
9	FC Stade Lausanne Ouchy	28	9	7	12	40	36	+4	34	
10	Grand-Lancy FC	28	10	3	15	36	51	−15	33	
11	FC Echallens	28	8	7	13	45	51	−6	31	
12	FC Stade Nyonnais	28	6	13	9	30	40	−10	31	
13	FC Bex	28	9	4	15	34	53	−19	31	
14	Vevey Sports	28	5	5	18	35	57	−22	20	Play-out against relegation
15	FC Sierre	28	5	4	19	37	63	−26	19	Relegation to 2. Liga Interregional
16	FC Sion	0	0	0	0	0	0	0	0	FC Sion were admitted to the Challenge League on 29 October 2003

Source: Erste Liga official website
Rules for classification: 1) Points; 2) Goal difference within the league or play-off for qualifiers.

== Group 2 ==
=== Teams ===
Club	Canton	Stadium	Capacity
FC Altstetten	Zürich	Buchlern	1,000
Basel U-21	Basel-City	Stadion Rankhof or Leichtathletik-Stadion St. Jakob	7,000; 4,000
FC Biel-Bienne	Bern	Stadion Gurzelen	15,000
FC Colombier	Neuchâtel	Stade des Chézards	2,500
SC Dornach	Solothurn	Gigersloch	2,500
Grasshopper Club U-21	Zürich	GC/Campus Niederhasli	2,000
FC Grenchen	Solothurn	Stadium Brühl	15,100
FC Münsingen	Bern	Sportanlage Sandreutenen	1,400
FC Red Star Zürich	Zürich	Allmend Brunau	2,000
FC Seefeld Zürich	Zürich	Sportanlage Lengg	1,000
FC Serrières	Neuchâtel	Pierre-à-Bot	1,700
FC Solothurn	Solothurn	Stadion FC Solothurn	6,750
FC Wangen bei Olten	Solothurn	Sportplatz Chrüzmatt	3,000
Young Boys U-21	Bern	Allmend Bern	2,000
SC YF Juventus	Zürich	Utogrund	2,850
Zürich U-21	Zürich	Sportplatz Heerenschürli	1,120

=== Final group table ===
Pos	Team	Pld	W	D	L	GF	GA	GD	Pts	Qualification or relegation
1	SC Young Fellows Juventus	30	18	8	4	66	34	+32	62	Play-off to Challenge League
2	Basel U-21	30	18	5	7	70	46	+24	59	Not eligible to Play-offs
3	FC Wangen bei Olten	30	16	6	8	58	41	+17	54	Play-off to Challenge League
4	FC Biel-Bienne	30	14	8	8	52	34	+18	50	
5	FC Red Star Zürich	30	14	6	10	55	48	+7	48	
6	FC Solothurn	30	14	6	10	47	49	−2	48	
7	Zürich U-21	30	13	7	10	46	40	+6	46	
8	FC Grenchen	30	13	6	11	50	49	+1	45	
9	SC Dornach	30	13	5	12	55	62	−7	44	
10	Grasshopper Club U-21	30	11	9	10	49	43	+6	42	
11	FC Münsingen	30	11	7	12	36	38	−2	40	
12	FC Serrières	30	10	7	13	35	41	−6	37	
13	Young Boys U-21	30	8	8	14	55	49	+6	32	
14	FC Seefeld Zürich	30	9	3	18	45	60	−15	30	
15	FC Altstetten	30	3	8	19	25	69	−44	17	Play-out against relegation
16	FC Colombier	30	4	3	23	24	65	−41	15	Relegation to 2. Liga Interregional

Source: Erste Liga official website
Rules for classification: 1) Points; 2) Goal difference within the league or play-off for qualifiers.

== Group 3 ==
=== Teams ===
Club	Canton	Stadium	Capacity
GC Biaschesi	Ticino	Campo Sportivo "Al Vallone"	2,850
SC Buochs	Nidwalden	Stadion Seefeld	5,000
SC Cham	Zug	Stadion Eizmoos	1,800
FC Chur 97	Grisons	Ringstrasse	2,820
FC Frauenfeld	Thurgau	Kleine Allmend	6,370
FC Gossau	St. Gallen	Sportanlage Buechenwald	3,500
FC Kreuzlingen	Thurgau	Sportplatz Hafenareal	1,200
Luzern U-21	Lucerne	Stadion Allmend or Allmend Süd	15,000; 2,000
FC Locarno	Locarno, Ticino	Stadio comunale Lido	5,000
FC Mendrisio	Ticino	Centro Sportivo Comunale	4,000
SV Schaffhausen	Schaffhausen	Sportplatz Bühl	1,000
FC Schötz	Lucerne	Sportplatz Wissenhusen	1,750
St. Gallen U-21	St. Gallen	Espenmoos	11,000
FC Tuggen	Schwyz	Linthstrasse	2,800
SC Zofingen	Aargau	Sportanlagen Trinermatten	2,000
Zug 94	Zug	Herti Allmend Stadion	6,000

=== Final league table ===
Pos	Team	Pld	W	D	L	GF	GA	GD	Pts	Qualification or relegation
1	FC Locarno	30	16	10	4	56	28	+28	58	Play-off to Challenge League
2	FC Kreuzlingen	30	14	12	4	49	26	+23	54	Play-off to Challenge League
3	FC Tuggen	30	13	14	3	58	34	+24	53	Play-off to Challenge League
4	FC Schötz	30	15	8	7	51	36	+15	53	
5	SC Buochs	30	14	11	5	40	28	+12	53	
6	FC Mendrisio	30	14	7	9	60	43	+17	49	
7	Zug 94	30	13	8	9	42	38	+4	47	
8	FC Gossau	30	10	8	12	40	52	−12	38	
9	FC Chur 97	30	9	10	11	31	46	−15	37	
10	Luzern U-21	30	8	9	13	40	49	−9	33	
11	FC Frauenfeld	30	10	3	17	43	60	−17	33	
12	St. Gallen U-21	30	7	9	14	37	46	−9	30	
13	SC Cham	30	7	9	14	34	48	−14	30	
14	GC Biaschesi	30	7	8	15	47	54	−7	29	
15	SC Zofingen	30	7	8	15	41	58	−17	29	Relegation to 2. Liga Interregional
16	SV Schaffhausen	30	5	8	17	23	46	−23	23	Relegation to 2. Liga Interregional

Source: Erste Liga official website
Rules for classification: 1) Points; 2) Goal difference within the league or play-off for qualifiers.

== Promotion play-off ==
Qualified for the play-offs were the first two teams from group 1; Étoile Carouge and Baulmes, from group 2; Young Fellows Juventus and because Basel U-21 were not eligible to the play-offs, this right was passed down to Wangen b.O. Then from group 3 the first two teams were Locarno and Kreuzlingen. Because in group 2 the third placed team was already qualified in this situation, the two best third best teams were Malley from group 1 and Tuggen from group 3 and they also advanced to the play-off stage.

=== Qualification round ===
Team 1	Score	Team 2
Tuggen	3–1	Étoile Carouge
Étoile Carouge	3–2	Tuggen

Tuggen win 5–4 on aggregate and continue to the finals.

Team 1	Score	Team 2
Malley	1–0	YFJ
YFJ	0–3	Malley

Young Fellows Juventus win 3–1 on aggregate and continue to the finals.

Team 1	Score	Team 2
Wangen b.O.	1–1	Locarno
Locarno	0–0	Wangen b.O.

1–1 on aggregate, Locarno win on away goals and continue to the finals.

Team 1	Score	Team 2
Kreuzlingen	1–2	Baulmes
Baulmes	3–2	Kreuzlingen

Baulmes win 5–3 on aggregate and continue to the finals.

=== Final round ===
Team 1	Score	Team 2
Tuggen	3–2	YFJ
YFJ	3–0	Tuggen

Young Fellows Juventus win 5–3 on aggregate and are promoted to 2004–05 Challenge League.

Team 1	Score	Team 2
Locarno	1–1	Baulmes
Baulmes	2–1	Locarno

Baulmes win 3–2 on aggregate and are promoted to 2004–05 Challenge League.

== Relegation play-out ==
Team 1	Score	Team 2
Altstetten	1–0	Vevey Sports
Vevey Sports	2–2	Altstetten

Altstetten win 3–2 on aggregate and remain in the division. Vevey Sports is relegated to 2. Liga Interregional.

== Summary ==
Group 1 champions were Étoile Carouge and runners-up were Baulmes. Carouge failed for promotion during the play-offs, in contrast to Baulmes, who won their finals. Baulmes were declaired as 1. Liga champions. Group 2 champions were [[SC Young Fellows Juventus]|Young Fellows Juventus]], runners-up were Basel U-21 but they were not eligible to the play-offs, this right was passed down to third placed Wangen b.O. YFJ achieved promotion during the play-offs, but Wangen b.O. failed. Group 3 champions were Locarno and Kreuzlingen were runners-up. Both teams failed in their promotion attempts in the play-off stage.

The remaining teams in the division were to be joined in next season by Lausanne-Sport, FC Alle, FC Langenthal, FC Brugg and FC Herisau as the five 2. Liga Interregional group winners and by Urania Genève Sport, who were the best placed runners-up. They were also joined by SR Delémont who had suffered relegation from the 2003–04 Challenge League.

== See also ==
- 2003–04 Swiss Super League
- 2003–04 Swiss Challenge League
- 2003–04 Swiss Cup

== Sources ==
- Switzerland 2003–04 at RSSSF
- Season 2003–04 at the official website

Preceded by 2002–03	Seasons in Swiss 1. Liga	Succeeded by 2004–05
