= 2011–12 Swiss 1. Liga =

1. Liga
- Season: 2011–12
- Champions: Group 1: Sion U-21; Group 2: BSC Old Boys; Group 3: FC Tuggen
- Promoted: Clubs; FC Fribourg; Yverdon-Sport FC; BSC Old Boys; FC Breitenrain Bern; FC Tuggen; Schaffhausen; SC Young Fellows Juventus; Youth teams Sion U-21; Zürich U-21; Basel U-21; St. Gallen U-21
- Europa League: USV Eschen/Mauren
- Matches: 720

The 2011–12 Swiss 1. Liga was the final season of this league as the third highest tier in the Swiss football league system. From next season it would become the fourth highest tier. The 1. Liga is and remains the highest tier in Swiss amateur football, but many teams at that time had professional or semi-professional players.

== Format ==
The 1. Liga in the 2011–12 season was divided into three regional groups, each with 16 teams. Within each group, the teams would play a double round-robin to decide their positions in the league. Due to the creation of the 1. Liga Promotion that was due to commence the following year, this season would see the number of teams in the groups reduced from 16 to 14, and it would be renamed as 1. Liga Classic. The new Promotion League would serve as the semi-professional link to amateur football. Six clubs could achieve promotion to the new third division, if they had applied for the semi-professional status. Due to the bankruptcy of Xamax in January 2012 it resulted that seven clubs were promoted. The four best U-21 teams would receive a wild card and advance as well. This reconstruction was done to decrease the competitive gap between the professional two top tiers and the amateur leagues.

== Group 1 ==
=== Teams ===
Club	Canton	Stadium	Capacity
FC Baulmes	Vaud	Stade Sous-Ville	2,500
FC Bulle	Fribourg	Stade de Bouleyres	7,000
SC Düdingen	Fribourg	Stadion Birchhölzli	3,000
FC Echallens	Vaud	Sportplatz 3 Sapins	2,000
FC Fribourg	Fribourg	Stade Universitaire	9,000
Grand-Lancy FC	Geneva	Stade de Marignac	1,500
FC Le Mont	Vaud	Centre Sportif du Châtaignier	2,500
ES FC Malley	Vaud	Centre Sportif de la Tuilière	1,500
FC Martigny-Sports	Valais	Stade d'Octodure	2,500
FC Meyrin	Geneva	Stade des Arbères	9,000
FC Monthey	Valais	Stade Philippe Pottier	1,800
FC Naters	Valais	Sportanlage Stapfen	3,000
Sion U-21	Valais	Stade de Tourbillon	20,200
Urania Genève Sport	Geneva	Stade de Frontenex	4,000
Young Boys U-21	Bern	Stadion Wankdorf or Allmend Bern	32,000; 2,000
Yverdon-Sport FC	Vaud	Stade Municipal	6,600

=== Final group table ===
Pos	Team	Pld	W	D	L	GF	GA	GD	Pts	Qualification or relegation
1	Sion U-21	30	17	5	8	70	41	+29	56	Youth team wild card
2	Young Boys U-21	30	16	4	10	74	50	+24	52	To 1. Liga Classic
3	FC Fribourg	30	16	4	10	52	40	+12	52	Promoted to 2012–13 1. Liga Promotion
4	Yverdon-Sport FC	30	15	7	8	53	44	+9	52	Promoted to 2012–13 1. Liga Promotion
5	FC Le Mont	30	15	6	9	51	45	+6	51	To 1. Liga Classic
6	Grand-Lancy FC	30	13	9	8	56	44	+12	48	To 1. Liga Classic
7	FC Meyrin	30	13	6	11	57	42	+15	45	To 1. Liga Classic
8	SC Düdingen	30	14	3	13	63	59	+4	45	To 1. Liga Classic
9	FC Echallens	30	12	8	10	62	49	+13	44	To 1. Liga Classic
10	FC Martigny-Sports	30	11	8	11	51	50	+1	41	To 1. Liga Classic
11	ES FC Malley	30	10	8	12	66	61	+5	38	To 1. Liga Classic
12	FC Bulle	30	10	7	13	46	59	−13	37	To 1. Liga Classic
13	Urania Genève Sport	30	10	6	14	51	67	−16	36	To 1. Liga Classic
14	FC Monthey	30	7	9	14	50	66	−16	30	To 1. Liga Classic
15	FC Naters	30	8	5	17	42	72	−30	29	To 1. Liga Classic
16	FC Baulmes	30	3	5	22	25	80	−55	14	To 1. Liga Classic

Source: Erste Liga official website
Rules for classification: 1) Points; 2) Goal difference; 3) Goals scored; 4) Head-to-head points; 5) Away goals scored; 6) Draw.

== Group 2 ==
=== Teams ===
Club	Canton	Stadium	Capacity
FC Baden	Aargau	Esp Stadium	7,000
Basel U-21	Basel-City	Stadion Rankhof or Youth Campus Basel	7,000; 1,000
FC Breitenrain Bern	Bern	Spitalacker	1,450
SC Dornach	Solothurn	Gigersloch	2,500
Grasshopper Club U-21	Zürich	GC/Campus Niederhasli	2,000
FC Grenchen	Solothurn	Stadium Brühl	15,100
FC Münsingen	Bern	Sportanlage Sandreutenen	1,400
SV Muttenz	Basel-Country	Sportplatz Margelacker	3,200
BSC Old Boys	Basel-City	Stadion Schützenmatte	8,000
FC Schötz	Lucerne	Sportplatz Wissenhusen	1,750
FC Serrières	Neuchâtel	Pierre-à-Bot	1,700
FC Solothurn	Solothurn	Stadion FC Solothurn	6,750
Thun U-21	Bern	Stadion Lachen	10,350
FC Wangen bei Olten	Solothurn	Sportplatz Chrüzmatt	3,000
SC Zofingen	Aargau	Sportanlagen Trinermatten	2,000
Zürich U-21	Zürich	Sportplatz Heerenschürli	1,120

=== Final group table ===
Pos	Team	Pld	W	D	L	GF	GA	GD	Pts	Qualification or relegation
1	BSC Old Boys	30	20	2	8	68	36	+32	62	Promoted to 2012–13 1. Liga Promotion
2	FC Breitenrain Bern	30	18	7	5	54	25	+29	61	Promoted to 2012–13 1. Liga Promotion
3	FC Baden	30	19	3	8	61	31	+30	60	To 1. Liga Classic
4	Zürich U-21	30	16	3	11	55	49	+6	51	Youth team wild card
5	FC Münsingen	30	14	8	8	42	36	+6	50	To 1. Liga Classic
6	Basel U-21	30	13	8	9	56	36	+20	47	Youth team wild card
7	FC Solothurn	30	13	6	11	52	43	+9	45	To 1. Liga Classic
8	SC Dornach	30	12	8	10	54	50	+4	44	To 1. Liga Classic
9	FC Schötz	30	12	6	12	54	57	−3	42	To 1. Liga Classic
10	Grasshopper Club U-21	30	12	4	14	50	58	−8	40	To 1. Liga Classic
11	FC Wangen bei Olten	30	8	9	13	29	47	−18	33	To 1. Liga Classic
12	FC Serrières	30	7	11	12	43	47	−4	32	To 1. Liga Classic
13	FC Grenchen	30	8	5	17	29	64	−35	29	To 1. Liga Classic
14	SV Muttenz	30	8	3	19	41	74	−33	27	To 1. Liga Classic
15	Thun U-21	30	6	8	16	46	58	−12	26	To 1. Liga Classic
16	SC Zofingen	30	5	7	18	35	58	−23	22	To 1. Liga Classic

Source: Erste Liga official website
Rules for classification: 1) Points; 2) Goal difference; 3) Goals scored; 4) Head-to-head points; 5) Away goals scored; 6) Draw.

== Group 3 ==
=== Teams ===
Club	Canton	Stadium	Capacity
FC Balzers	(Liechtenstein)	Sportplatz Rheinau	2,000
GC Biaschesi	Ticino	Campo Sportivo "Al Vallone"	2,850
SC Cham	Zug	Stadion Eizmoos	1,800
USV Eschen/Mauren	(Liechtenstein)	Sportpark Eschen-Mauren	6,000
FC Gossau	St. Gallen	Sportanlage Buechenwald	3,500
SV Höngg	Zürich	Hönggerberg	1,000
Lugano U-21	Ticino	Cornaredo Stadium	6,330
Luzern U-21	Lucerne	Swissporarena or Allmend Süd	16,800; 2,000
FC Mendrisio	Ticino	Centro Sportivo Comunale	4,000
FC Muri	Aargau	Stadion Brühl	2,350
Rapperswil-Jona	St. Gallen	Stadion Grünfeld	2,500
FC Schaffhausen	Schaffhausen	Stadion Breite	7,300
St. Gallen U-21	St. Gallen	Espenmoos or Kybunpark	3,000; 19,264
FC Tuggen	Schwyz	Linthstrasse	2,800
Winterthur U-21	Zürich	Schützenwieseor; Schützenwiese Sportplätze	8,550; 1,500
SC YF Juventus	Zürich	Utogrund	2,850

=== Final group table ===
Pos	Team	Pld	W	D	L	GF	GA	GD	Pts	Qualification or relegation
1	FC Tuggen	30	22	3	5	69	31	+38	69	Promoted to 2012–13 1. Liga Promotion
2	FC Schaffhausen	30	21	3	6	88	28	+60	66	Promoted to 2012–13 1. Liga Promotion
3	SC Young Fellows Juventus	30	20	4	6	83	34	+49	64	Promoted to 2012–13 1. Liga Promotion
4	USV Eschen/Mauren	30	15	8	7	56	43	+13	53	Qualification to Europa League first qualifying round (Note: USV Eschen/Mauren qualified as 2011–12 Liechtenstein Cup winners.)
5	St. Gallen U-21	30	14	8	8	52	43	+9	50	Youth team wild card
6	FC Rapperswil-Jona	30	11	14	5	60	51	+9	47	To 1. Liga Classic
7	SC Cham	30	13	6	11	58	46	+12	45	To 1. Liga Classic
8	FC Mendrisio	30	12	6	12	38	33	+5	42	To 1. Liga Classic
9	Luzern U-21	30	12	4	14	56	59	−3	40	To 1. Liga Classic
10	FC Balzers	30	10	5	15	48	66	−18	35	To 1. Liga Classic
11	Winterthur U-21	30	9	5	16	37	57	−20	32	To 1. Liga Classic
12	GC Biaschesi	30	6	11	13	39	53	−14	29	To 1. Liga Classic
13	Lugano U-21	30	8	4	18	36	64	−28	28	To 1. Liga Classic
14	FC Muri	30	7	7	16	35	66	−31	28	To 1. Liga Classic
15	SV Höngg	30	6	5	19	31	70	−39	23	To 1. Liga Classic
16	FC Gossau	30	5	5	20	42	84	−42	20	To 1. Liga Classic

Source: Erste Liga official website
Rules for classification: 1) Points; 2) Goal difference; 3) Goals scored; 4) Head-to-head points; 5) Away goals scored; 6) Draw.

== See also ==
- 2011–12 Swiss Super League
- 2011–12 Swiss Challenge League
- 2011–12 Swiss Cup

== Sources ==
- Josef Zindel (2018). FC Basel 1893. Die ersten 125 Jahre (in German). Basel: Friedrich Reinhardt Verlag. ISBN 978-3-7245-2305-5.
- Switzerland 2011/12 at RSSSF
- Season 2011–12 at the official website

Preceded by 2010–11	Seasons in Swiss football	Succeeded by 2012–13
