= 2004–05 Swiss 1. Liga =

1. Liga
- Season: 2004–05
- Champions: Group 1: Lausanne-Sport; Group 2: Biel-Bienne; Group 3: Tuggen
- Promoted: Locarno; Lausanne-Sport
- Relegated: Group 1: Malley; Stade Lausanne Ouchy; Group 2: Alle; Langenthal; Group 3: Chur; Gossau
- Matches: 3 times 240 plus 12 play-offs

The 2004–05 Swiss 1. Liga was the 73rd season of this league since its creation in 1931 and, at this time, it was the third tier of the Swiss football league system. The 1. Liga was also the highest level of Swiss amateur football, despite an ever-increasing number of clubs in this league playing with professional or, more often than not, semi-professional players in their ranks and this was not just the case with the U-21 teams of the professional clubs.

== Format ==
There were 48 teams in this division, including seven U-21 teams, which were the eldest youth teams of the professional clubs in the Super League and the Challenge League. The 1. Liga was divided into three regional groups, each with 16 teams. Within each group, the teams would play a double round-robin to decide their positions in the league. The three group winners, the runners-up, together with the two best third placed teams, then contested a play-off for the two promotion slots. The U-21 teams were not eligible for promotion and could not compete in the play-offs. The two last placed teams in each group were to be directly relegated to the 2. Liga Interregional.

== Group 1 ==
=== Teams ===
Club	Canton	Stadium	Capacity
FC Bex	Vaud	Relais	2,000
CS Chênois	Geneva	Stade des Trois-Chêne	8,000
FC Echallens	Vaud	Sportplatz 3 Sapins	2,000
Étoile Carouge FC	Geneva	Stade de la Fontenette	3,690
FC Fribourg	Fribourg	Stade Universitaire	9,000
Grand-Lancy FC	Geneva	Stade de Marignac	1,500
Lausanne-Sport	Vaud	Stade Olympique de la Pontaise	15,700
ES FC Malley	Vaud	Centre Sportif de la Tuilière	1,500
FC Martigny-Sports	Valais	Stade d'Octodure	2,500
FC Naters	Valais	Sportanlage Stapfen	3,000
FC Serrières	Neuchâtel	Pierre-à-Bot	1,700
Servette U-21	Geneva	Stade de Genève	30,084
FC Stade Lausanne Ouchy	Vaud	Centre sportif de Vidy	1,000
FC Stade Nyonnais	Vaud	Stade de Colovray	7,200
Urania Genève Sport	Geneva	Stade de Frontenex	4,000
Young Boys U-21	Bern	Stadion Neufeld or Allmend Bern	14,000; 2,000

=== Final league table ===
Pos	Team	Pld	W	D	L	GF	GA	GD	Pts	Qualification or relegation
1	FC Lausanne-Sport	30	20	3	7	64	27	+37	63	Play-off to Challenge League
2	FC Serrières	30	16	10	4	53	31	+22	58	Play-off to Challenge League
3	Étoile Carouge FC	30	18	3	9	76	49	+27	57	Play-off to Challenge League
4	FC Echallens	30	15	11	4	60	41	+19	56	
5	FC Bex	30	14	8	8	55	43	+12	50	
6	CS Chênois	30	14	4	12	53	53	0	46	
7	Young Boys U-21	30	12	8	10	48	43	+5	44	
8	FC Martigny-Sports	30	11	11	8	46	43	+3	44	
9	FC Stade Nyonnais	30	10	6	14	52	59	−7	36	
10	Grand-Lancy FC	30	9	9	12	43	51	−8	36	
11	FC Fribourg	30	9	6	15	40	49	−9	33	
12	FC Naters	30	9	5	16	54	67	−13	32	
13	Urania Genève Sport	30	8	8	14	49	62	−13	32	
14	Servette U-21	30	9	5	16	50	71	−21	32	
15	ES FC Malley	30	8	6	16	54	74	−20	30	Relegation to 2. Liga Interregional
16	FC Stade Lausanne Ouchy	30	3	7	20	31	65	−34	16	Relegation to 2. Liga Interregional

Source: Erste Liga official website
Rules for classification: 1) Points; 2) Goal difference within the league or play-off for qualifiers.

== Group 2 ==
=== Teams ===
Club	Canton	Stadium	Capacity
FC Alle	Jura	Centre Sportif Régional	000
Basel U-21	Basel-City	Stadion Rankhof or Leichtathletik-Stadion St. Jakob	7,000; 4,000
FC Biel-Bienne	Bern	Stadion Gurzelen	15,000
SC Buochs	Nidwalden	Stadion Seefeld	5,000
SC Cham	Zug	Stadion Eizmoos	1,800
SR Delémont	Jura	La Blancherie	5,263
SC Dornach	Solothurn	Gigersloch	2,500
FC Grenchen	Solothurn	Stadium Brühl	15,100
FC Langenthal	Bern	Rankmatte	2,000
Luzern U-21	Lucerne	Stadion Allmend or Allmend Süd	15,000; 2,000
FC Münsingen	Bern	Sportanlage Sandreutenen	1,400
FC Schötz	Lucerne	Sportplatz Wissenhusen	1,750
FC Solothurn	Solothurn	Stadion FC Solothurn	6,750
FC Wangen bei Olten	Solothurn	Sportplatz Chrüzmatt	3,000
SC Zofingen	Aargau	Sportanlagen Trinermatten	2,000
Zug 94	Zug	Herti Allmend Stadion	6,000

=== Final league table ===
Pos	Team	Pld	W	D	L	GF	GA	GD	Pts	Qualification or relegation
1	FC Biel-Bienne	30	21	7	2	77	24	+53	70	Play-off to Challenge League
2	FC Wangen bei Olten	30	15	6	9	55	41	+14	51	Play-off to Challenge League
3	FC Grenchen	30	14	8	8	53	39	+14	50	
4	FC Solothurn	30	14	7	9	55	44	+11	49	
5	Zug 94	30	13	8	9	60	47	+13	47	
6	FC Münsingen	30	14	5	11	43	43	0	47	
7	Luzern U-21	30	12	6	12	50	52	−2	42	
8	FC Schötz	30	10	11	9	47	46	+1	41	
9	SC Zofingen	30	11	7	12	46	45	+1	40	
10	Basel U-21	30	10	9	11	60	49	+11	39	
11	SC Dornach	30	11	6	13	56	66	−10	39	
12	SC Cham	30	10	6	14	40	50	−10	36	
13	SR Delémont	30	10	5	15	37	53	−16	35	
14	SC Buochs	30	9	6	15	40	55	−15	33	
15	FC Alle	30	4	10	16	36	62	−26	22	Relegation to 2. Liga Interregional
16	FC Langenthal	30	5	7	18	35	74	−39	22	Relegation to 2. Liga Interregional

Source: Erste Liga official website
Rules for classification: 1) Points; 2) Goal difference within the league or play-off for qualifiers.

== Group 3 ==
=== Teams ===
Club	Canton	Stadium	Capacity
FC Altstetten	Zürich	Buchlern	1,000
GC Biaschesi	Ticino	Campo Sportivo "Al Vallone"	2,850
FC Brugg	Aargau	Stadion Au	3,300
FC Chur 97	Grisons	Ringstrasse	2,820
FC Frauenfeld	Thurgau	Kleine Allmend	6,370
FC Gossau	St. Gallen	Sportanlage Buechenwald	3,500
Grasshopper Club U-21	Zürich	GC/Campus Niederhasli	2,000
FC Herisau	Appenzell Ausserrhoden	Ebnet	2,000
FC Kreuzlingen	Thurgau	Sportplatz Hafenareal	1,200
FC Locarno	Locarno, Ticino	Stadio comunale Lido	5,000
FC Mendrisio	Ticino	Centro Sportivo Comunale	4,000
FC Red Star Zürich	Zürich	Allmend Brunau	2,000
FC Seefeld Zürich	Zürich	Sportanlage Lengg	1,000
St. Gallen U-21	St. Gallen	Espenmoos	11,000
FC Tuggen	Schwyz	Linthstrasse	2,800
Zürich U-21	Zürich	Sportplatz Heerenschürli	1,120

=== Final league table ===
Pos	Team	Pld	W	D	L	GF	GA	GD	Pts	Qualification or relegation
1	FC Tuggen	30	21	3	6	70	37	+33	66	Play-off to Challenge League
2	FC Locarno	30	15	7	8	54	36	+18	52	Play-off to Challenge League
3	FC Red Star Zürich	30	14	9	7	64	35	+29	51	Play-off to Challenge League
4	FC Mendrisio	30	11	15	4	40	31	+9	48	
5	FC Kreuzlingen	30	13	8	9	52	48	+4	47	
6	Zürich U-21	30	12	9	9	46	40	+6	45	
7	Grasshopper Club U-21	30	13	6	11	39	36	+3	45	
8	St. Gallen U-21	30	12	6	12	43	47	−4	42	
9	GC Biaschesi	30	10	10	10	35	41	−6	40	
10	FC Herisau	30	9	10	11	38	46	−8	37	
11	FC Altstetten	30	9	7	14	29	48	−19	34	
12	FC Brugg	30	8	9	13	34	53	−19	33	
13	FC Frauenfeld	30	9	5	16	45	53	−8	32	
14	FC Seefeld Zürich	30	8	7	15	44	52	−8	31	
15	FC Chur 97	30	6	12	12	42	53	−11	30	Relegation to 2. Liga Interregional
16	FC Gossau	30	6	5	19	41	60	−19	23	Relegation to 2. Liga Interregional

Source: Erste Liga official website
Rules for classification: 1) Points; 2) Goal difference within the league or play-off for qualifiers.

== Promotion play-off ==
Qualified for the play-offs were the first two teams from group 1; Lausanne-Sport and Serrières, from group 2; Biel-Bienne and Wangen b.O. and from group 3; Tuggen and Locarno. The two best third best teams were Étoile Carouge from group 1 and Red Star from group 3.

=== Qualification round ===
Team 1	Score	Team 2
Étoile Carouge	1–0	Tuggen
Tuggen	1–2	Étoile Carouge

Étoile Carouge win 3–1 on aggregate and advance to Finals.

Team 1	Score	Team 2
Wangen b.O.	2–2	Lausanne-Sport
Lausanne-Sport	6–1	Wangen b.O.

Lausanne-Sport win 8–3 on aggregate and advance to Finals.

Team 1	Score	Team 2
Locarno	1–1	Serrières
Serrières	0–1	Locarno

Locarno win 2–1 on aggregate and advance to Finals.

Team 1	Score	Team 2
Red Star	4–1	Biel-Bienne
Biel-Bienne	1–2	Red Star

Red Star win 6–2 on aggregate and advance to Finals.

=== Final round ===
Team 1	Score	Team 2
Locarno	2–1	Red Star
Red Star	0–2	Locarno

Locarno win 4–1 on aggregate and are promoted to 2005–06 Challenge League.

Team 1	Score	Team 2
Lausanne-Sport	2–1	Étoile Carouge
Étoile Carouge	3–3	Lausanne-Sport

Lausanne-Sport win 5–4 on aggregate and are promoted to 2005–06 Challenge League.

== Summary ==
Group 1 champions were newly promoted Lausanne-Sport, they also achieved immediate promotion to the 2005–06 Challenge League. Runners-up in this group were Serrières, but they failed in their promotion attempt. Group 2 champions were Biel-Bienne and runners-up were Wangen b.O. However, both failed in their promotion attempts. The champions of group 3, Tuggen, also missed promotion. The runners-up in group 3 were Locarno and they achieved promotion. Relegated were Malley and Stade Lausanne Ouchy from group 1, Alle and Langenthal from group 2 and from group 3 Chur and Gossau. The remaining teams in the division were to be joined in next season by Signal FC Bernex-Confignon, SC Düdingen, FC Kickers Luzern, SV Muttenz and FC Rapperswil-Jona, all of whom had won their 2. Liga Interregional groups.

== See also ==
- 2004–05 Swiss Super League
- 2004–05 Swiss Challenge League
- 2004–05 Swiss Cup

== Sources ==
- Switzerland 2004/05 at RSSSF
- Season 2004–05 at the official website

Preceded by 2003–04	Seasons in Swiss 1. Liga	Succeeded by 2005–06
