= 2002–03 Swiss 1. Liga =

1. Liga
- Season: 2002–03
- Champions: Group 1: Meyrin; Group 2: Young Fellows Juventus; Group 3: Malcantone
- Promoted: Meyrin; Malcantone; Chiasso; Bulle; La Chaux-de-Fonds
- Relegated: Group 2: Aarau U-21; Group 3: Rapperswil-Jona
- Matches: 3 times 240 plus 12 play-offs plus 1 play-out

The 2002–03 Swiss 1. Liga was the 71st season of this league since its creation in 1931 and it was the third tier of the Swiss football league system. The 1. Liga was also the highest level of amateur football, even though there was an ever-increasing number of clubs in this league that played with professional or semi-professional players in their ranks and this not just in the U-21 teams of the professional clubs.

== Format ==
There were 48 teams in this division this season, including seven U-21 teams, which were the eldest youth teams of the professional clubs in the Super League and the Challenge League. The 1. Liga was divided into three regional groups, each with 16 teams. Within each group, the teams would play a double round-robin to decide their positions in the league. The three group winners and the three runners-up, together with the two best third placed teams, then contested a play-off for the four promotion slots. The U-21 teams were not eligible for promotion and could not compete the play-offs. The last placed teams in each group were to contest a play-out to decide relegation, two teams would be relegated to the 2. Liga Interregional.

== Group 1 ==
=== Teams ===
Club	Canton	Stadium	Capacity
FC Baulmes	Vaud	Stade Sous-Ville	2,500
FC Bex	Vaud	Relais	2,000
FC Bulle	Fribourg	Stade de Bouleyres	7,000
FC Echallens	Vaud	Sportplatz 3 Sapins	2,000
CS Chênois	Geneva	Stade des Trois-Chêne	8,000
Étoile Carouge FC	Geneva	Stade de la Fontenette	3,690
FC Fribourg	Fribourg	Stade Universitaire	9,000
Grand-Lancy FC	Geneva	Stade de Marignac	1,500
ES FC Malley	Vaud	Centre Sportif de la Tuilière	1,500
FC Martigny-Sports	Valais	Stade d'Octodure	2,500
FC Meyrin	Geneva	Stade des Arbères	9,000
FC Naters	Valais	Sportanlage Stapfen	3,000
Servette U-21	Geneva	Stade de la Fontenette or Stade de Frontenex	3,690; 4,000
FC Stade Lausanne Ouchy	Vaud	Centre sportif de Vidy	1,000
FC Stade Nyonnais	Vaud	Stade de Colovray	7,200
Vevey Sports	Vaud	Stade de Copet	4,000

=== Final league table ===
Pos	Team	Pld	W	D	L	GF	GA	GD	Pts	Qualification or relegation
1	FC Meyrin	30	22	5	3	79	25	+54	71	Play-off to Challenge League
2	FC Bulle	30	17	4	9	58	46	+12	55	Play-off to Challenge League
3	Servette U-21	30	16	4	10	52	34	+18	52	
4	Étoile Carouge FC	30	14	7	9	57	41	+16	49	
5	FC Echallens	30	14	7	9	57	42	+15	49	
6	ES FC Malley	30	14	3	13	58	52	+6	45	
7	FC Martigny-Sports	30	12	5	13	53	54	−1	41	
8	FC Bex	30	11	7	12	62	46	+16	40	
9	FC Naters	30	11	7	12	45	52	−7	40	
10	FC Fribourg	30	10	9	11	51	55	−4	39	
11	FC Stade Lausanne Ouchy	30	10	6	14	38	48	−10	36	
12	FC Baulmes	30	9	8	13	37	50	−13	35	
13	CS Chênois	30	9	6	15	38	52	−14	33	
14	Grand-Lancy FC	30	9	6	15	38	64	−26	33	
15	Vevey Sports	30	8	5	17	40	68	−28	29	
16	FC Stade Nyonnais	30	7	5	18	31	65	−34	26	Play-out against relegation

Source: Erste Liga official website
Rules for classification: 1) Points; 2) Goal difference within the league or play-off for qualifiers.

== Group 2 ==
=== Teams ===
Club	Canton	Stadium	Capacity
FC Altstetten	Zürich	Buchlern	1,000
Aarau U-21	Aargau	Stadion Brügglifeld	9,240
Basel U-21	Basel-City	Stadion Rankhof or Leichtathletik-Stadion St. Jakob	7,000; 4,000
FC Biel-Bienne	Bern	Stadion Gurzelen	15,000
FC Colombier	Neuchâtel	Stade des Chézards	2,500
Grasshopper Club U-21	Zürich	GC/Campus Niederhasli	2,000
FC Grenchen	Solothurn	Stadium Brühl	15,100
FC La Chaux-de-Fonds	Neuchâtel	Centre Sportif de la Charrière	12,700
FC Münsingen	Bern	Sportanlage Sandreutenen	1,400
SV Schaffhausen	Schaffhausen	Sportplatz Bühl	1,000
FC Serrières	Neuchâtel	Pierre-à-Bot	1,700
FC Solothurn	Solothurn	Stadion FC Solothurn	6,750
FC Wangen bei Olten	Solothurn	Sportplatz Chrüzmatt	3,000
SC YF Juventus	Zürich	Utogrund	2,850
SC Zofingen	Aargau	Sportanlagen Trinermatten	2,000
Zürich U-21	Zürich	Sportplatz Heerenschürli	1,120

=== Final league table ===
Pos	Team	Pld	W	D	L	GF	GA	GD	Pts	Qualification or relegation
1	SC Young Fellows Juventus	30	18	7	5	58	33	+25	61	Play-off to Challenge League
2	FC Wangen bei Olten	30	16	8	6	61	33	+28	56	Play-off to Challenge League
3	FC La Chaux-de-Fonds	30	15	11	4	46	27	+19	56	Play-off to Challenge League
4	FC Solothurn	30	15	6	9	51	31	+20	51	
5	Basel U-21	30	12	12	6	66	44	+22	48	
6	FC Biel-Bienne	30	12	12	6	50	34	+16	48	
7	SV Schaffhausen	30	12	6	12	39	36	+3	42	
8	Grasshopper Club U-21	30	12	6	12	55	55	0	42	
9	Zürich U-21	30	10	10	10	54	40	+14	40	
10	FC Colombier	30	9	12	9	43	43	0	39	
11	FC Serrières	30	9	11	10	35	38	−3	38	
12	FC Grenchen	30	9	9	12	65	59	+6	36	
13	FC Altstetten	30	7	14	9	37	50	−13	35	
14	FC Münsingen	30	5	9	16	33	55	−22	24	
15	SC Zofingen	30	3	8	19	31	83	−52	17	
16	Aarau U-21	30	4	3	23	23	86	−63	15	Withdrew from play-out, relegated

Source: Erste Liga official website
Rules for classification: 1) Points; 2) Goal difference within the league or play-off for qualifiers.

== Group 3 ==
=== Teams ===
Club	Canton	Stadium	Capacity
GC Biaschesi	Ticino	Campo Sportivo "Al Vallone"	2,850
SC Buochs	Nidwalden	Stadion Seefeld	5,000
FC Chiasso	Ticino	Stadio Comunale Riva IV	4,000
FC Chur 97	Grisons	Ringstrasse	2,820
FC Frauenfeld	Thurgau	Kleine Allmend	6,370
FC Gossau	St. Gallen	Sportanlage Buechenwald	3,500
FC Kreuzlingen	Thurgau	Sportplatz Hafenareal	1,200
FC Locarno	Locarno, Ticino	Stadio comunale Lido	5,000
Luzern U-21	Lucerne	Stadion Allmend or Allmend Süd	15,000; 2,000
FC Malcantone Agno	Ticino	Cornaredo Stadium	6,330
FC Mendrisio	Ticino	Centro Sportivo Comunale	4,000
FC Rapperswil-Jona	St. Gallen	Stadion Grünfeld	2,500
FC Schötz	Lucerne	Sportplatz Wissenhusen	1,750
St. Gallen U-21	St. Gallen	Espenmoos	11,000
FC Tuggen	Schwyz	Linthstrasse	2,800
Zug 94	Zug	Herti Allmend Stadion	6,000

=== Final league table ===
Pos	Team	Pld	W	D	L	GF	GA	GD	Pts	Qualification or relegation
1	FC Malcantone Agno	30	16	13	1	53	25	+28	61	Play-off to Challenge League
2	FC Chiasso	30	17	8	5	56	31	+25	59	Play-off to Challenge League
3	FC Tuggen	30	17	7	6	58	35	+23	58	Play-off to Challenge League
4	FC Mendrisio	30	13	9	8	48	36	+12	48	
5	FC Locarno	30	11	12	7	47	33	+14	45	
6	FC Chur 97	30	11	12	7	49	43	+6	45	
7	GC Biaschesi	30	12	9	9	40	36	+4	45	
8	SC Buochs	30	12	8	10	53	40	+13	44	
9	St. Gallen U-21	30	12	6	12	45	48	−3	42	
10	FC Kreuzlingen	30	11	4	15	44	52	−8	37	
11	Zug 94	30	9	6	15	29	38	−9	33	
12	FC Gossau	30	8	7	15	28	53	−25	31	
13	Luzern U-21	30	8	6	16	44	53	−9	30	
14	FC Schötz	30	7	8	15	38	50	−12	29	
15	FC Frauenfeld	30	5	10	15	34	64	−30	25	
16	FC Rapperswil-Jona	30	5	7	18	31	60	−29	22	Play-out against relegation

Source: Erste Liga official website
Rules for classification: 1) Points; 2) Goal difference within the league or play-off for qualifiers.

== Promotion play-off ==
=== Finals ===
Team 1	Score	Team 2
Tuggen	2–2	Meyrin
Meyrin	2–0	Tuggen

Meyrin win 4–2 on aggregate and are promoted to 2003–04 Challenge League.

Team 1	Score	Team 2
La Chaux-de-Fonds	1–0	Malcantone
Malcantone	3–1	La Chaux-de-Fonds

Malcantone win 3–2 on aggregate and are promoted to 2003–04 Challenge League.

Team 1	Score	Team 2
Chiasso	1–1	Wangen b.O.
Wangen b.O.	3–1	Chiasso

Chiasso win 4–2 on aggregate and were promoted to 2003–04 Challenge League.

Team 1	Score	Team 2
Bulle	1–1	YFJ
YFJ	1–3	Bulle

Bulle win 4–1 on aggregate and were promoted to 2003–04 Challenge League.

La Chaux-de-Fonds were later also promoted later on the green table by the Swiss Football Association up to the 2003–04 Challenge League following the fact that FC Sion were refused their licence for that division.

== Play-out against relegation ==
Aarau U-21 withdrew from play-outs and were so relegated directly. The one remaining match was played in a neutral venue, on May 25 in Solothurn.

Team 1	Score	Team 2
Stade Nyonnais	2–2	Rapperswil-Jona

FC Stade Nyonnais win 5–4 in the penalty shoot-out. Rapperswil-Jona were relegated. Stade Nyonnais remain at this level.

== Summary ==
Group 1 champions were Meyrin, runners-up were Bulle and they both achieved promotion. Group 2 champions were Young Fellows Juventus and runners-up were Wangen b.O. but they both failed in their promotion attempts in the play-offs. Group 3 champions were Malcantone, runners-up Chiasso and both these teams also achieved promotion. Third placed team in group 2 La Chaux-de-Fonds were later also promoted to 2003–04 Challenge League, as best loser, following the fact that FC Sion were refused a licence for that division.

Due to the bankruptcy of FC Lausanne-Sport, who were demoted to the fourth tier, no team from the higher tier would join the 1. Liga. The remaining teams in the division were to be joined in next season by FC Sierre, Young Boys U-21, SC Dornach, FC Seefeld Zürich, FC Red Star Zürich and SC Cham who had all achieved promotion from the 2. Liga Interregional.

== See also ==
- 2002–03 Nationalliga A
- 2002–03 Swiss Cup

== Sources ==
- Switzerland 2002–03 at RSSSF
- Season 2002–03 at the official website

Preceded by 2001–02	Seasons in Swiss 1. Liga	Succeeded by 2003–04
