= 2006–07 Swiss 1. Liga =

1. Liga
- Season: 2006–07
- Champions: Group 1: Étoile Carouge; Group 2: Basel U-21; Group 3: Red Star
- Promoted: Cham; Gossau
- Relegated: Group 1: Martigny; Chênois; Group 2: Dornach; Kickers Luzern; Group 3: Seefeld; Chur
- Matches: 3 times 240 plus 12 play-offs

The 2006–07 Swiss 1. Liga was the 75th season of this league and, at this time, was the third tier of the Swiss football league system. The 1. Liga was the highest level of amateur football, although a number of teams had professional or semi-professional players in their ranks.

== Format ==
There were 48 teams in this division this season, including eight U-21 teams which were the eldest youth teams of the professional clubs in the Super League and the Challenge League. The 1. Liga was divided into three regional groups, each with 16 teams. Within each group, the teams would play a double round-robin to decide their positions in the league. The three groups winners and three runners-up, together with the two best third placed teams, then contested a play-off for the two promotion slots. The U-21 teams were not eligible for promotion and could not compete the play-offs. The two last placed teams in each group was relegated to the 2. Liga Interregional.

== Group 1 ==
=== Teams ===
| Club | Canton | Stadium | Capacity |
|---|---|---|---|
| FC Bex | Vaud | Relais | 2,000 |
| FC Bulle | Fribourg | Stade de Bouleyres | 7,000 |
| CS Chênois | Geneva | Stade des Trois-Chêne | 8,000 |
| SC Düdingen | Fribourg | Stadion Birchhölzli | 3,000 |
| FC Echallens | Vaud | Sportplatz 3 Sapins | 2,000 |
| Étoile Carouge FC | Geneva | Stade de la Fontenette | 3,690 |
| FC Fribourg | Fribourg | Stade Universitaire | 9,000 |
| FC La Tour/Le Pâquier | Fribourg | Stade de Bouleyres | 7,000 |
| ES FC Malley | Vaud | Centre Sportif de la Tuilière | 1,500 |
| FC Martigny-Sports | Valais | Stade d'Octodure | 2,500 |
| FC Meyrin | Geneva | Stade des Arbères | 9,000 |
| FC Naters | Valais | Sportanlage Stapfen | 3,000 |
| FC Serrières | Neuchâtel | Pierre-à-Bot | 1,700 |
| Sion U-21 | Valais | Stade de Tourbillon | 20,200 |
| FC Stade Nyonnais | Vaud | Stade de Colovray | 7,200 |
| Urania Genève Sport | Geneva | Stade de Frontenex | 4,000 |

=== Final league table ===
| Pos | Team | Pld | W | D | L | GF | GA | GD | Pts | Qualification or relegation |
|---|---|---|---|---|---|---|---|---|---|---|
| 1 | Étoile Carouge FC | 30 | 18 | 10 | 2 | 60 | 13 | +47 | 64 | Promotion play-offs to 2007–08 Challenge League |
| 2 | Urania Genève Sport | 30 | 18 | 7 | 5 | 60 | 32 | +28 | 61 | Promotion play-offs to 2007–08 Challenge League |
| 3 | FC Stade Nyonnais | 30 | 17 | 6 | 7 | 54 | 34 | +20 | 57 | Promotion play-offs to 2007–08 Challenge League |
| 4 | Sion U-21 | 30 | 15 | 7 | 8 | 49 | 37 | +12 | 52 | |
| 5 | ES FC Malley | 30 | 13 | 8 | 9 | 54 | 45 | +9 | 47 | |
| 6 | FC Naters | 30 | 13 | 4 | 13 | 52 | 55 | −3 | 43 | |
| 7 | FC Fribourg | 30 | 9 | 14 | 7 | 43 | 39 | +4 | 41 | |
| 8 | FC Echallens | 30 | 10 | 10 | 10 | 40 | 38 | +2 | 40 | |
| 9 | FC Bex | 30 | 10 | 6 | 14 | 44 | 54 | −10 | 36 | |
| 10 | FC La Tour/Le Pâquier | 30 | 8 | 9 | 13 | 51 | 58 | −7 | 33 | |
| 11 | SC Düdingen | 30 | 9 | 5 | 16 | 31 | 53 | −22 | 32 | |
| 12 | FC Bulle | 30 | 8 | 7 | 15 | 43 | 48 | −5 | 31 | |
| 13 | FC Meyrin | 30 | 7 | 10 | 13 | 35 | 48 | −13 | 31 | |
| 14 | FC Serrières | 30 | 7 | 10 | 13 | 32 | 50 | −18 | 31 | |
| 15 | FC Martigny-Sports | 30 | 7 | 9 | 14 | 33 | 47 | −14 | 30 | Relegation to 2. Liga Interregional |
| 16 | CS Chênois | 30 | 6 | 8 | 16 | 34 | 64 | −30 | 26 | Relegation to 2. Liga Interregional |

Source: RSSSF
Erste Liga official website
Rules for classification: 1) Points; 2) Goal difference within the league or play-off for qualifiers.

== Group 2 ==
=== Teams ===
| Club | Canton | Stadium | Capacity |
|---|---|---|---|
| Basel U-21 | Basel-City | Stadion Rankhof or Leichtathletik-Stadion St. Jakob | 7,000; 4,000 |
| FC Biel-Bienne | Bern | Tissot Arena | 5,200 |
| SC Cham | Zug | Stadion Eizmoos | 1,800 |
| SC Dornach | Solothurn | Gigersloch | 2,500 |
| FC Grenchen | Solothurn | Stadium Brühl | 15,100 |
| FC Kickers Luzern | Lucerne | Stadion Auf Tribschen | 2,950 |
| FC Laufen | Basel-Country | Sportplatz Nau | 3,000 |
| Luzern U-21 | Lucerne | Stadion Allmend or Allmend Süd | 11,000; 2,000 |
| FC Münsingen | Bern | Sportanlage Sandreutenen | 1,400 |
| SV Muttenz | Basel-Country | Sportplatz Margelacker | 3,200 |
| FC Olten | Solothurn | Sportanlagen Kleinholz | 8,000 |
| FC Solothurn | Solothurn | Stadion FC Solothurn | 6,750 |
| FC Wangen bei Olten | Solothurn | Sportplatz Chrüzmatt | 3,000 |
| Young Boys U-21 | Bern | Stadion Wankdorf or Allmend Bern | 32,000; 2,000 |
| SC Zofingen | Aargau | Sportanlagen Trinermatten | 2,000 |
| Zug 94 | Zug | Herti Allmend Stadion | 6,000 |

=== Final league table ===
| Pos | Team | Pld | W | D | L | GF | GA | GD | Pts | Qualification or relegation |
|---|---|---|---|---|---|---|---|---|---|---|
| 1 | Basel U-21 | 30 | 23 | 6 | 1 | 100 | 23 | +77 | 75 | Not eligible to Play-off |
| 2 | FC Biel-Bienne | 30 | 19 | 8 | 3 | 60 | 18 | +42 | 65 | Promotion play-offs to 2007–08 Challenge League |
| 3 | FC Solothurn | 30 | 18 | 8 | 4 | 55 | 22 | +33 | 62 | Promotion play-offs to 2007–08 Challenge League |
| 4 | SC Cham | 30 | 16 | 6 | 8 | 46 | 33 | +13 | 54 | Promotion play-offs to 2007–08 Challenge League |
| 5 | SC Zofingen | 30 | 13 | 6 | 11 | 49 | 49 | 0 | 45 | |
| 6 | Luzern U-21 | 30 | 11 | 8 | 11 | 48 | 51 | −3 | 41 | |
| 7 | FC Wangen bei Olten | 30 | 12 | 5 | 13 | 48 | 58 | −10 | 41 | |
| 8 | SV Muttenz | 30 | 11 | 8 | 11 | 53 | 54 | −1 | 41 | |
| 9 | Young Boys U-21 | 30 | 10 | 8 | 12 | 42 | 51 | −9 | 38 | |
| 10 | Zug 94 | 30 | 9 | 9 | 12 | 37 | 40 | −3 | 36 | |
| 11 | FC Laufen | 30 | 8 | 10 | 12 | 39 | 39 | 0 | 34 | |
| 12 | FC Olten | 30 | 9 | 7 | 14 | 38 | 56 | −18 | 34 | |
| 13 | FC Grenchen | 30 | 9 | 5 | 16 | 43 | 65 | −22 | 32 | |
| 14 | FC Münsingen | 30 | 7 | 11 | 12 | 33 | 40 | −7 | 32 | |
| 15 | SC Dornach | 30 | 5 | 4 | 21 | 33 | 72 | −39 | 19 | Relegation to 2. Liga Interregional |
| 16 | FC Kickers Luzern | 30 | 3 | 5 | 22 | 32 | 85 | −53 | 14 | Relegation to 2. Liga Interregional |

Source: RSSSF
Erste Liga official website
Rules for classification: 1) Points; 2) Goal difference within the league or play-off for qualifiers.

== Group 3 ==
=== Teams ===
| Club | Canton | Stadium | Capacity |
|---|---|---|---|
| FC Baden | Aargau | Esp Stadium | 7,000 |
| GC Biaschesi | Ticino | Campo Sportivo "Al Vallone" | 2,850 |
| FC Brugg | Aargau | Stadion Au | 3,300 |
| FC Chur 97 | Grisons | Ringstrasse | 2,820 |
| FC Gossau | Gossau, St. Gallen | Sportanlage Buechenwald | 3,500 |
| Grasshopper Club U-21 | Zürich | GC/Campus Niederhasli | 2,000 |
| FC Herisau | Appenzell Ausserrhoden | Ebnet | 2,000 |
| FC Kreuzlingen | Thurgau | Sportplatz Hafenareal | 1,200 |
| FC Mendrisio | Ticino | Centro Sportivo Comunale | 4,000 |
| FC Rapperswil-Jona | St. Gallen | Stadion Grünfeld | 2,500 |
| FC Red Star Zürich | Zürich | Allmend Brunau | 2,000 |
| FC Seefeld Zürich | Zürich | Sportanlage Lengg | 1,000 |
| St. Gallen U-21 | St. Gallen | Espenmoos | 11,000 |
| FC Tuggen | Schwyz | Linthstrasse | 2,800 |
| Winterthur U-21 | Zürich | Schützenwiese or Schützenwiese Sportplätze | 8,550; 1,500 |
| Zürich U-21 | Zürich | Sportplatz Heerenschürli | 1,120 |

=== Final league table ===
| Pos | Team | Pld | W | D | L | GF | GA | GD | Pts | Qualification or relegation |
|---|---|---|---|---|---|---|---|---|---|---|
| 1 | FC Red Star Zürich | 30 | 18 | 5 | 7 | 55 | 27 | +28 | 59 | Promotion play-offs to 2007–08 Challenge League |
| 2 | Zürich U-21 | 30 | 18 | 3 | 9 | 53 | 32 | +21 | 57 | Not eligible to Play-off |
| 3 | FC Gossau | 30 | 16 | 6 | 8 | 61 | 35 | +26 | 54 | Promotion play-offs to 2007–08 Challenge League |
| 4 | GC Biaschesi | 30 | 14 | 9 | 7 | 46 | 34 | +12 | 51 | |
| 5 | St. Gallen U-21 | 30 | 14 | 6 | 10 | 43 | 36 | +7 | 48 | |
| 6 | FC Tuggen | 30 | 13 | 6 | 11 | 44 | 48 | −4 | 45 | |
| 7 | Grasshopper Club U-21 | 30 | 12 | 9 | 9 | 64 | 43 | +21 | 45 | |
| 8 | FC Herisau | 30 | 11 | 8 | 11 | 42 | 36 | +6 | 41 | |
| 9 | Winterthur U-21 | 30 | 11 | 8 | 11 | 51 | 46 | +5 | 41 | |
| 10 | FC Rapperswil-Jona | 30 | 12 | 4 | 14 | 53 | 52 | +1 | 40 | |
| 11 | FC Mendrisio-Stabio | 30 | 8 | 9 | 13 | 34 | 47 | −13 | 33 | |
| 12 | FC Brugg | 30 | 8 | 7 | 15 | 41 | 59 | −18 | 31 | |
| 13 | FC Baden | 30 | 9 | 4 | 17 | 25 | 49 | −24 | 31 | |
| 14 | FC Kreuzlingen | 30 | 8 | 7 | 15 | 36 | 54 | −18 | 31 | |
| 15 | FC Seefeld Zürich | 30 | 7 | 9 | 14 | 33 | 55 | −22 | 30 | Relegation to 2. Liga Interregional |
| 16 | FC Chur 97 | 30 | 8 | 6 | 16 | 32 | 60 | −28 | 30 | Relegation to 2. Liga Interregional |

Source: RSSSF
Erste Liga official website
Rules for classification: 1) Points; 2) Goal difference within the league or play-off for qualifiers.

== Promotion play-off ==
=== Qualification round ===
| Team 1 | Score | Team 2 |
|---|---|---|
| SC Cham | 1–1 | Étoile Carouge FC |
| Étoile Carouge FC | 2–2 | SC Cham |

Aggregate 3–3, Cham win on away goals

| Team 1 | Score | Team 2 |
|---|---|---|
| Urania Genève Sport | 3–2 | Red Star Zürich |
| Red Star Zürich | 2–2 | Urania Genève Sport |

Urania win 5–4 on aggregate

| Team 1 | Score | Team 2 |
|---|---|---|
| FC Gossau | 1–2 | FC Solothurn |
| FC Solothurn | 0–3 | FC Gossau |

Gossau win 4–2 on aggregate

| Team 1 | Score | Team 2 |
|---|---|---|
| FC Stade Nyonnais | 1–1 | Biel-Bienne |
| Biel-Bienne | 1–0 | FC Stade Nyonnais |

Biel-Bienne win 2–1 on aggregate

=== Final round ===
| Team 1 | Score | Team 2 |
|---|---|---|
| SC Cham | 1–1 | Biel-Bienne |
| Biel-Bienne | 1–2 | SC Cham |

Cham win 3–2 on aggregate

| Team 1 | Score | Team 2 |
|---|---|---|
| FC Gossau | 1 – 0 | Urania Genève Sport |
| Urania Genève Sport | 2 – 5 | FC Gossau |

Gossau win 6–2 on aggregate

SC Cham and FC Gossau are promoted in Challenge League.

== Summary ==
Group 1 champions were Étoile Carouge and runners-up were Urania Genève Sport. Group 2 champions were Basel U-21, but they were not eligible to the play-offs, this right was passed down to second and third placed Biel-Bienne and FC Solothurn. Group 3 champions were Red Star Zürich. Runners-up were Zürich U-21, but too they were not eligible to the play-offs and this right was passed down to second placed FC Gossau. The best two third placed teams were Stade Nyonnais from group 1 and SC Cham from group 2. In the play-offs Cham and Gossau achieved promotion to the Challenge League.

From group 1 Martigny and Chênois were relegated. From group 2 Dornach and Kickers Luzern suffered relegation and from group 3 Seefeld and Chur suffered relegation too. The remaining teams in the division were to be joined in next season by FC Savièse, SV Lyss, FC Küsnacht, SV Schaffhausen, FC Schötz and BSC Old Boys, these beings the five 2. Liga Interregional group winners and by the best placed runners-up. They were also joined by FC Baulmes and SC YF Juventus who had just suffered relegation after the 2003–04 Challenge League.

== Sources ==
- Switzerland 2006/07 at RSSSF
- Season 2006–07 at the official website

| Preceded by 2005–06 | Seasons in Swiss 1. Liga | Succeeded by 2007–08 |
