= 2001–02 Swiss 1. Liga =

1. Liga
- Season: 2001–02
- Champions: Group 1: Colombier; Group 2: FC Schaffhausen; Group 3: Malcantone
- Promoted: Wohlen; FC Schaffhausen
- Relegated: Group 1: Lausanne-Sport U-21; Sion U-21; Group 2: FC Red Star Zürich; FC Schwamendingen; Group 3: FC Freienbach; FC Rorschach
- Matches: 3 times 240 plus 9 play-offs

The 2001–02 Swiss 1. Liga was the 70th season of this league since its creation in 1931. The 1. Liga was the third tier of the Swiss football league system and it was also the highest level of amateur football, even though there was an ever-increasing number of clubs in this league that played with professional or semi-professional players.

== Format ==
There were 48 teams in this division this season, including eight U-21 teams, which were the eldest youth teams of the professional clubs in the Super League and the Challenge League. The 1. Liga was divided into three regional groups, each with 16 teams. Within each group, the teams would play a double round-robin to decide their positions in the league. The three group winners and the three runners-up then contested a play-off for the two promotion slots. The U-21 teams were not eligible for promotion and could not compete the play-offs. The last placed team in each group were directly relegated to the 2. Liga Interregional.

== Group 1 ==
=== Teams ===
Club	Canton	Stadium	Capacity
FC Baulmes	Vaud	Stade Sous-Ville	2,500
FC Bex	Vaud	Relais	2,000
CS Chênois	Geneva	Stade des Trois-Chêne	8,000
FC Colombier	Neuchâtel	Stade des Chézards	2,500
FC Echallens	Vaud	Sportplatz 3 Sapins	2,000
Grand-Lancy FC	Geneva	Stade de Marignac	1,500
FC La Chaux-de-Fonds	Neuchâtel	Centre Sportif de la Charrière	12,700
Lausanne-Sport U-21	Vaud	Stade Olympique de la Pontaise	15,700
FC Naters	Valais	Sportanlage Stapfen	3,000
FC Meyrin	Geneva	Stade des Arbères	9,000
FC Serrières	Neuchâtel	Pierre-à-Bot	1,700
Servette U-21	Geneva	Stade de Genève	30,084
Sion U-21	Valais	Stade de Tourbillon	20,200
FC Stade Lausanne Ouchy	Vaud	Centre sportif de Vidy	1,000
FC Stade Nyonnais	Vaud	Stade de Colovray	7,200
Vevey Sports	Vaud	Stade de Copet	4,000

=== Final league table ===
Pos	Team	Pld	W	D	L	GF	GA	GD	Pts	Qualification or relegation
1	FC Colombier	30	17	7	6	49	37	+12	58	Play-off to Challenge League
2	FC Serrières	30	15	8	7	45	32	+13	53	Play-off to Challenge League
3	CS Chênois	30	15	7	8	56	38	+18	52	
4	FC Baulmes	30	15	4	11	66	53	+13	49	
5	FC Echallens	30	13	6	11	48	36	+12	45	
6	FC Naters	30	12	9	9	59	48	+11	45	
7	FC La Chaux-de-Fonds	30	12	6	12	50	47	+3	42	
8	FC Stade Lausanne Ouchy	30	11	9	10	42	43	−1	42	
9	FC Meyrin	30	12	5	13	51	52	−1	41	
10	FC Bex	30	9	10	11	39	43	−4	37	
11	Vevey Sports	30	10	7	13	43	53	−10	37	
12	Grand-Lancy FC	30	9	8	13	46	49	−3	35	
13	FC Stade Nyonnais	30	9	8	13	43	51	−8	35	
14	Servette U-21	30	9	8	13	41	56	−15	35	
15	Lausanne-Sport U-21	30	10	4	16	44	65	−21	34	Relegation to 2. Liga Interregional
16	Sion U-21	30	7	4	19	32	51	−19	25	Relegation to 2. Liga Interregional

Source: Erste Liga official website
Rules for classification: 1) Points; 2) Goal difference within the league or play-off for qualifiers.

== Group 2 ==
=== Teams ===
Club	Canton	Stadium	Capacity
FC Altstetten	Zürich	Buchlern	1,000
Basel U-21	Basel-City	Stadion Rankhof or Leichtathletik-Stadion St. Jakob	7,000; 4,000
FC Biel-Bienne	Bern	Stadion Gurzelen	15,000
FC Bulle	Fribourg	Stade de Bouleyres	7,000
FC Fribourg	Fribourg	Stade Universitaire	9,000
Grasshopper Club U-21	Zürich	GC/Campus Niederhasli	2,000
FC Grenchen	Solothurn	Stadium Brühl	15,100
FC Münsingen	Bern	Sportanlage Sandreutenen	1,400
FC Red Star Zürich	Zürich	Allmend Brunau	2,000
FC Schaffhausen	Schaffhausen	Stadion Breite	7,300
SV Schaffhausen	Schaffhausen	Sportplatz Bühl	1,000
FC Solothurn	Solothurn	Stadion FC Solothurn	6,750
FC Schwamendingen	Zürich	Sportanlage Heerenschürli	1,522
FC Wangen bei Olten	Solothurn	Sportplatz Chrüzmatt	3,000
SC YF Juventus	Zürich	Utogrund	2,850
Zürich U-21	Zürich	Sportplatz Heerenschürli	1,120

=== Final league table ===
Pos	Team	Pld	W	D	L	GF	GA	GD	Pts	Qualification or relegation
1	FC Schaffhausen	30	19	8	3	52	23	+29	65	Play-off to Challenge League
2	FC Solothurn	30	16	8	6	60	34	+26	56	Decider for play-off
3	SC Young Fellows Juventus	30	16	8	6	65	46	+19	56	Decider winners, play-off to Challenge League
4	Grasshopper Club U-21	30	14	7	9	62	53	+9	49	
5	Basel U-21	30	14	6	10	67	46	+21	48	
6	FC Biel-Bienne	30	12	8	10	47	43	+4	44	
7	Zürich U-21	30	12	8	10	45	46	−1	44	
8	FC Grenchen	30	11	8	11	52	43	+9	41	
9	FC Altstetten	30	9	10	11	35	40	−5	37	
10	FC Wangen bei Olten	30	8	11	11	56	54	+2	35	
11	SV Schaffhausen	30	9	8	13	34	45	−11	35	
12	FC Bulle	30	9	8	13	37	52	−15	35	
13	FC Münsingen	30	9	8	13	35	51	−16	35	
14	FC Fribourg	30	9	7	14	43	47	−4	34	
15	FC Red Star Zürich	30	8	6	16	32	52	−20	30	Relegation to 2. Liga Interregional
16	FC Schwamendingen	30	4	3	23	24	71	−47	15	Relegation to 2. Liga Interregional

Source: Erste Liga official website
Rules for classification: 1) Points; 2) Goal difference within the league or play-off for qualifiers.

=== Decider ===
The two teams Solothurn and Young Fellows Juventus ended the season level on points and so they had to play a decision match to resolve second position and the play-off slot. This match was played on May 21, 2002, in Sursee.

Team 1	Score	Team 2
Solothurn	1–3	YFJ

SC Young Fellows Juventus win and advance, as group runner-up, to play-offs.

== Group 3 ==
=== Teams ===
Club	Canton	Stadium	Capacity
SC Buochs	Nidwalden	Stadion Seefeld	5,000
FC Chiasso	Ticino	Stadio Comunale Riva IV	4,000
FC Chur 97	Grisons	Ringstrasse	2,820
FC Freienbach	Schwyz	Chrummen	4,500
FC Gossau	St. Gallen	Sportanlage Buechenwald	3,500
FC Kreuzlingen	Thurgau	Sportplatz Hafenareal	1,200
Luzern U-21	Lucerne	Stadion Allmend or Allmend Süd	15,000; 2,000
FC Malcantone Agno	Ticino	Cornaredo Stadium	6,330
FC Mendrisio	Ticino	Centro Sportivo Comunale	4,000
FC Rapperswil-Jona	St. Gallen	Stadion Grünfeld	2,500
FC Rorschach	Schwyz	Sportplatz Kellen	1,000
FC Schötz	Lucerne	Sportplatz Wissenhusen	1,750
St. Gallen U-21	St. Gallen	Espenmoos	11,000
FC Tuggen	Schwyz	Linthstrasse	2,800
FC Wohlen	Aargau	Stadion Niedermatten	3,734
Zug 94	Zug	Herti Allmend Stadion	6,000

=== Final league table ===
Pos	Team	Pld	W	D	L	GF	GA	GD	Pts	Qualification or relegation
1	FC Malcantone Agno	30	19	6	5	63	33	+30	63	Play-off to Challenge League
2	FC Wohlen	30	18	8	4	61	28	+33	62	Play-off to Challenge League
3	FC Tuggen	30	17	9	4	58	24	+34	60	
4	SC Buochs	30	15	7	8	35	29	+6	52	
5	St. Gallen U-21	30	10	13	7	38	34	+4	43	
6	FC Chiasso	30	11	9	10	39	28	+11	42	
7	FC Chur 97	30	12	6	12	58	56	+2	42	
8	FC Mendrisio	30	12	5	13	34	38	−4	41	
9	FC Schötz	30	9	10	11	44	52	−8	37	
10	Luzern U-21	30	9	8	13	42	46	−4	35	
11	FC Gossau	30	8	11	11	39	48	−9	35	
12	FC Kreuzlingen	30	10	5	15	34	50	−16	35	
13	Zug 94	30	9	7	14	35	38	−3	34	
14	FC Rapperswil-Jona	30	7	9	14	43	45	−2	30	
15	FC Freienbach	30	6	5	19	38	71	−33	23	Relegation to 2. Liga Interregional
16	FC Rorschach	30	5	8	17	31	72	−41	23	Relegation to 2. Liga Interregional

Source: Erste Liga official website
Rules for classification: 1) Points; 2) Goal difference within the league or play-off for qualifiers.

== Promotion play-off ==
The three group winners and the three runners-up contested this play-off for the two promotion slots. The U-21 teams were not eligible for this stage.

=== Qualification round ===
Team 1	Score	Team 2
Wohlen	4–1	Colombier
FC Colombier	2–2	Wohlen

Wohlen win 6–3 on aggregate and continue to the finals.

Team 1	Score	Team 2
YFJ	1–0	Malcantone
Malcantone	3–2	YFJ

3–3 on aggregate, Young Fellows Juventus win on away goals and continue to the finals.

Team 1	Score	Team 2
Serrières	1–4	Schaffhausen
Schaffhausen	1–0	Serrières

Schaffhausen win 5–1 on aggregate and continue to the finals.

=== Final round ===
Team 1	Score	Team 2
YFJ	1–2	Wohlen
Wohlen	0–0	Schaffhausen
Schaffhausen	1–1	YFJ

=== Final table ===
Pos	Team	Pld	W	D	L	GF	GA	GD	Pts	Qualification or relegation
1	Wohlen	2	1	1	0	2	1	+1	4	Promotion to Challenge League
2	Schaffhausen	2	0	2	0	1	1	0	2	Promotion to Challenge League
3	Young Fellows Juventus	2	0	1	1	2	3	−1	1	

Source: Erste Liga official website
Rules for classification: 1) Points; 2) Play-off

== Summary ==
Group 1 champions were Colombier, runners-up were Serrières. Group 2 champions were Schaffhausen and runners-up were Young Fellows Juventus. Group 3 champions were Malcantone, runners-up were Wohlen. These six teams played a qualification and the three winners played a single round-robin to decide the two promotion slots. Wohlen and Schaffhausen secured their promotion to the second tier. Wohlen were 1. Liga champions.

From group 1 relegated were Lausanne-Sport U-21 and Sion U-21. Relegated from group 2 were the two clubs Red Star and Schwamendingen and from group 3 the two teams Freienbach and Rorschach also suffered relegation. The remaining teams in the division were to be joined in following season by ES Malley, Martigny-Sports, Zofingen, Aarau U-21, Biaschesi and Frauenfeld, each of which had won their 2. Liga Interregional groups.

== See also ==
- 2001–02 Nationalliga A
- 2001–02 Swiss Cup

== Sources ==
- 2001–02 at RSSSF
- Season 2001–02 at the official website

Preceded by 2000–01	Seasons in Swiss 1. Liga	Succeeded by 2002–03
