= 2010–11 Swiss 1. Liga =

1. Liga
- Season: 2010–11
- Champions: Group 1: Meyrin; Group 2: Schötz; Group 3: SC Brühl
- Promoted: Étoile Carouge; Brühl
- Relegated: Group 1: US Terre Sainte; Chênois; Group 2: Laufen; Bümpliz; Group 3: Zug 94; Buochs
- Matches: 782

The 2010–11 Swiss 1. Liga was the 79th season of this league and the third tier of the Swiss football league system, the highest level of amateur football, but many teams at that time had professional or semi-professional players in their ranks.

== Format ==
The 1. Liga had 48 teams, of which 10 were the eldest youth teams (U-21) of the professional clubs. The 1. Liga was divided into three regional groups. 16 teams compete in each group, playing each other twice over the course of the season. The top two teams in each group and the two best teams in third position then compete a play-off for two promotion places. The U-21 teams are not eligible for promotion. The last two teams in each group are relegated.

== Group 1 ==
=== Teams ===
Club	Canton	Stadium	Capacity
FC Baulmes	Vaud	Stade Sous-Ville	2,500
CS Chênois	Geneva	Stade des Trois-Chêne	8,000
SC Düdingen	Fribourg	Stadion Birchhölzli	3,000
FC Echallens	Vaud	Sportplatz 3 Sapins	2,000
FC Fribourg	Fribourg	Stade Universitaire	9,000
Étoile Carouge FC	Geneva	Stade de la Fontenette	3,690
Grand-Lancy FC	Geneva	Stade de Marignac	1,500
FC Le Mont	Vaud	Centre Sportif du Châtaignier	2,500
ES FC Malley	Vaud	Centre Sportif de la Tuilière	1,500
FC Martigny-Sports	Valais	Stade d'Octodure	2,500
FC Meyrin	Geneva	Stade des Arbères	9,000
FC Naters	Valais	Sportanlage Stapfen	3,000
Sion U-21	Valais	Stade de Tourbillon	20,200
US Terre Sainte	Vaud	Centre Sportif des Rojalets	1,400
Urania Genève Sport	Geneva	Stade de Frontenex	4,000
Young Boys U-21	Bern	Stadion Wankdorf or Allmend Bern	32,000; 2,000

=== Final group table ===
Pos	Team	Pld	W	D	L	GF	GA	GD	Pts	Qualification or relegation
1	FC Meyrin	30	21	3	6	74	38	+36	66	Play-off to Challenge League
2	Étoile Carouge FC	30	16	9	5	57	35	+22	57	Play-off to Challenge League
3	FC Le Mont	30	14	9	7	62	43	+19	51	Did not apply for licence
4	ES FC Malley	30	15	5	10	56	32	+24	50	Play-off to Challenge League
5	Grand-Lancy FC	30	13	7	10	43	42	+1	46	
6	FC Fribourg	30	13	6	11	48	46	+2	45	
7	Urania Genève Sport	30	13	5	12	48	53	−5	44	
8	SC Düdingen	30	12	5	13	57	68	−11	41	
9	FC Echallens	30	11	6	13	47	52	−5	39	
10	FC Martigny-Sports	30	10	6	14	36	46	−10	36	
11	Young Boys U-21	30	9	8	13	40	46	−6	35	
12	Sion U-21	30	9	6	15	44	51	−7	33	
13	FC Baulmes	30	9	6	15	36	48	−12	33	
14	FC Naters	30	9	5	16	51	65	−14	32	
15	US Terre Sainte	30	7	11	12	31	45	−14	32	Relegation to 2. Liga Interregional
16	CS Chênois	30	8	5	17	35	55	−20	29	Relegation to 2. Liga Interregional

Source: Erste Liga official website
Rules for classification: 1) Points; 2) Goal difference; 3) Goals scored; 4) Head-to-head points; 5) Away goals scored; 6) Draw.

== Group 2 ==
=== Teams ===
Club	Canton	Stadium	Capacity
Basel U-21	Basel-City	Stadion Rankhof or Youth Campus Basel	7,000; 1,000
FC Breitenrain Bern	Bern	Spitalacker	1,450
SC Bümpliz 78	Bern	Bodenweid	4,000
SC Dornach	Solothurn	Gigersloch	2,500
Grasshopper Club U-21	Zürich	GC/Campus Niederhasli	2,000
FC Grenchen	Solothurn	Stadium Brühl	15,100
FC Laufen	Basel-Country	Sportplatz Nau	3,000
FC Münsingen	Bern	Sportanlage Sandreutenen	1,400
SV Muttenz	Basel-Country	Sportplatz Margelacker	3,200
BSC Old Boys	Basel-City	Stadion Schützenmatte	8,000
FC Schötz	Lucerne	Sportplatz Wissenhusen	1,750
FC Solothurn	Solothurn	Stadion FC Solothurn	6,750
Thun U-21	Bern	Stadion Lachen	10,350
FC Wangen bei Olten	Solothurn	Sportplatz Chrüzmatt	3,000
SC Zofingen	Aargau	Sportanlagen Trinermatten	2,000
Zürich U-21	Zürich	Sportplatz Heerenschürli	1,120

=== Final group table ===
Pos	Team	Pld	W	D	L	GF	GA	GD	Pts	Qualification or relegation
1	FC Schötz	30	18	7	5	61	27	+34	61	Promotion to Challenge League
2	Zürich U-21	30	17	8	5	57	29	+28	59	Not eligible to Play-off
3	FC Breitenrain Bern	30	16	7	7	48	36	+12	55	Promotion to Challenge League
4	Basel U-21	30	14	8	8	68	34	+34	50	Not eligible to Play-off
5	Grasshopper Club U-21	30	15	4	11	58	48	+10	49	
6	Thun U-21	30	15	3	12	54	52	+2	48	
7	FC Münsingen	30	12	8	10	44	34	+10	44	
8	SC Zofingen	30	12	6	12	50	48	+2	42	
9	BSC Old Boys	30	11	9	10	46	46	0	42	
10	FC Wangen bei Olten	30	11	7	12	43	47	−4	40	
11	SV Muttenz	30	12	4	14	45	66	−21	40	
12	FC Solothurn	30	9	8	13	46	49	−3	35	
13	SC Dornach	30	8	8	14	42	53	−11	32	
14	FC Grenchen	30	6	10	14	40	49	−9	28	
15	FC Laufen	30	7	4	19	41	78	−37	25	Relegation to 2. Liga Interregional
16	SC Bümpliz 78	30	5	3	22	38	85	−47	18	Relegation to 2. Liga Interregional

Source: Erste Liga official website
Rules for classification: 1) Points; 2) Goal difference; 3) Goals scored; 4) Head-to-head points; 5) Away goals scored; 6) Draw.

== Group 3 ==
=== Teams ===
Club	Canton	Stadium	Capacity
FC Baden	Aargau	Esp Stadium	7,000
GC Biaschesi	Ticino	Campo Sportivo "Al Vallone"	2,850
SC Brühl	St. Gallen	Paul-Grüninger-Stadion	4,200
SC Buochs	Nidwalden	Stadion Seefeld	5,000
SC Cham	Zug	Stadion Eizmoos	1,800
USV Eschen/Mauren	(Liechtenstein)	Sportpark Eschen-Mauren	6,000
FC Gossau	St. Gallen	Sportanlage Buechenwald	3,500
Lugano U-21	Ticino	Cornaredo Stadium	6,330
Luzern U-21	Lucerne	Stadion Allmend or Allmend Süd	13,000; 2,000
FC Mendrisio	Ticino	Centro Sportivo Comunale	4,000
Rapperswil-Jona	St. Gallen	Stadion Grünfeld	2,500
St. Gallen U-21	St. Gallen	Espenmoos or Kybunpark	3,000; 19,264
FC Tuggen	Schwyz	Linthstrasse	2,800
Winterthur U-21	Zürich	Schützenwieseor; Schützenwiese Sportplätze	8,550; 1,500
SC YF Juventus	Zürich	Utogrund	2,850
Zug 94	Zug	Herti Allmend Stadion	6,000

=== Final group table ===
Pos	Team	Pld	W	D	L	GF	GA	GD	Pts	Qualification or relegation
1	SC Brühl	30	17	6	7	47	29	+18	57	Play-off to Challenge League
2	FC Tuggen	30	15	9	6	64	43	+21	54	Play-off to Challenge League
3	FC Baden	30	15	8	7	57	35	+22	53	Play-off to Challenge League
4	FC Rapperswil-Jona	30	13	11	6	60	44	+16	50	
5	SC Young Fellows Juventus	30	14	7	9	59	41	+18	49	
6	USV Eschen/Mauren	30	13	9	8	59	50	+9	48	
7	SC Cham	30	13	9	8	51	42	+9	48	
8	Luzern U-21	30	13	6	11	57	50	+7	45	
9	Winterthur U-21	30	12	6	12	53	51	+2	42	
10	St. Gallen U-21	30	12	6	12	59	59	0	42	
11	GC Biaschesi	30	10	7	13	48	49	−1	37	
12	FC Mendrisio	30	10	3	17	39	47	−8	33	
13	Lugano U-21	30	8	8	14	39	50	−11	32	
14	FC Gossau	30	9	5	16	46	72	−26	32	
15	Zug 94	30	9	4	17	47	65	−18	31	Relegation to 2. Liga Interregional
16	SC Buochs	30	3	4	23	32	90	−58	13	Relegation to 2. Liga Interregional

Source: Erste Liga official website
Rules for classification: 1) Points; 2) Goal difference; 3) Goals scored; 4) Head-to-head points; 5) Away goals scored; 6) Draw.

== Play-offs ==
=== Qualification round ===
1 June 2011
18:30

Breitenrain	1–2	Brühl
Goal	Summary	Goal

Spitalacker, Bern

5 June 2011
16:30

Brühl	1–0	Breitenrain
Goal	Summary

Paul-Grüninger-Stadion, St. Gallen

Brühl win 3–1 on aggregate and advance to Finals

1 June 2011
19:30

Étoile Carouge	1–1	Tuggen
Goal	Summary	Goal

Stade de la Fontenette, Carouge

5 June 2011
16:00

Tuggen	0–4	Étoile Carouge
Goal	Summary	Goal

Linthstrasse, Tuggen

Étoile Carouge win 5–1 on aggregate advance to Finals

1 June 2011
20:00

Baden	1–1	Meyrin
Goal	Sunnary	Goal

Esp Stadium, Fislisbach

5 June 2011
18:00

Meyrin	0–3	Baden
	Summary	Goal

Stade des Arbères, Meyrin

FC Baden win 4–1 on aggregate advance to Finals

1 June 2011
20:00

Malley	2–2	Schötz
Goal	Summary	Goal

Centre sportif de la Blécherette, Lausanne

5 June 2011
15:00

Schötz	2–5	Malley
Goal	Summary	Goal

Fussballanlage Wissenhusen, Schötz

Malley win 7–4 on aggregate advance to Finals

=== Final round ===
8 June 2011
19:30

Étoile Carouge	1–0	FC Baden
Goal	Summary

Stade de la Fontenette, Carouge

11 June 2011
19:00

FC Baden	0–0	Étoile Carouge
	Summary

Stadion Altenburg, Wettingen

Étoile Carouge win 1–0 on aggregate and achieve promotion

8 June 2011
20:00

Malley	1–1	Brühl
Goal		Goal

Centre sportif de la Blécherette, Lausanne

11 June 2011
16:30

Brühl	4–2	Malley
Goal	Summary	Goal

Paul-Grüninger-Stadion, St. Gallen

Brühl win 5–3 on aggregate and achieve promotion

== See also ==
- 2010–11 Swiss Super League
- 2010–11 Swiss Challenge League
- 2010–11 Swiss Cup

== Sources ==
- Switzerland 2010/11 at RSSSF
- Season 2010–11 at the official website
