= 2014–15 Swiss 1. Liga =

Swiss 1. Liga
- Season: 2014–15
- Champions: FC Stade Lausanne-Ouchy; SC Cham; FC Wettswil-Bonstetten
- Promoted: SC Cham; SC Kriens
- Relegated: FC Meyrin; FC Monthey; FC Concordia Basel; FC Grenchen; FC Lugano U21; AC Taverne

The 2014–15 season of the Swiss 1. Liga was the 93rd season of the fourth tier of the Swiss football league system.

== Tables ==
=== Group 1 ===
Pos	Team	Pld	W	D	L	GF	GA	GD	Pts	Promotion, qualification or relegation
1	FC Stade Lausanne-Ouchy (C)	26	13	9	4	45	28	+17	48	Qualification to Promotion play-offs
2	Yverdon Sport FC	26	13	8	5	58	42	+16	47	Qualification to Promotion play-offs
3	FC Bavois	26	14	4	8	51	32	+19	46	
4	FC Azzurri 90	26	13	5	8	46	36	+10	44	
5	FC Echallens	26	11	8	7	40	32	+8	41	
6	Team Vaud U21	26	11	8	7	39	31	+8	41	
7	SC Düdingen	26	11	6	9	50	41	+9	39	
8	FC Fribourg	26	10	8	8	38	36	+2	38	
9	Grand-Lancy FC	26	9	7	10	33	36	−3	34	
10	FC Naters	26	7	9	10	29	39	−10	30	
11	US Terre Sainte	26	7	7	12	38	46	−8	28	
12	FC Martigny-Sports	26	8	4	14	43	58	−15	28	
13	FC Meyrin (R)	26	8	3	15	31	43	−12	27	Relegation to 2. Liga Interregional
14	FC Monthey (R)	26	2	4	20	23	64	−41	10	Relegation to 2. Liga Interregional

Rules for classification: 1) Points; 2) Goal Difference
(C) Champions; (R) Relegated

=== Group 2 ===
Pos	Team	Pld	W	D	L	GF	GA	GD	Pts	Promotion, qualification or relegation
1	SC Cham (C, P)	26	20	2	4	90	38	+52	62	Qualification to Promotion play-offs
2	SC Kriens (P)	26	20	1	5	86	23	+63	61	Qualification to Promotion play-offs
3	Zug 94	26	18	2	6	78	32	+46	56	Qualification to Promotion play-offs
4	FC Solothurn	26	15	2	9	58	34	+24	47	
5	FC Wangen bei Olten	26	14	4	8	55	39	+16	46	
6	FC Black Stars Basel	26	13	5	8	59	51	+8	44	
7	BSC Young Boys II	26	13	3	10	57	47	+10	42	
8	FC Luzern II	26	13	2	11	82	40	+42	41	
9	FC Münsingen	26	12	3	11	62	47	+15	39	
10	FC Sursee	26	10	3	13	47	55	−8	33	
11	FC Schötz	26	8	1	17	36	57	−21	25	
12	FC Bern	26	3	5	18	23	66	−43	14	
13	FC Concordia Basel (R)	26	4	1	21	23	96	−73	13	Relegation to 2. Liga Interregional
14	FC Grenchen (R)	26	1	2	23	16	147	−131	5	Relegation to 2. Liga Interregional

Rules for classification: 1) Points; 2) Goal Difference
(C) Champions; (P) Promoted; (R) Relegated

=== Group 3 ===
Pos	Team	Pld	W	D	L	GF	GA	GD	Pts	Promotion, qualification or relegation
1	FC Wettswil-Bonstetten (C)	26	17	5	4	59	27	+32	56	Qualification to Promotion play-offs
2	FC Gossau	26	15	4	7	55	38	+17	49	Qualification to Promotion play-offs
3	FC Baden	26	13	7	6	54	32	+22	46	Qualification to Promotion play-offs
4	Grasshopper Club Zürich II	26	12	8	6	54	32	+22	44	
5	FC Muri	26	13	4	9	46	45	+1	43	Transferred to Group 2
6	FC Mendrisio-Stabio	26	12	4	10	29	28	+1	40	
7	FC Winterthur II	26	11	6	9	52	45	+7	39	
8	(Liechtenstein) USV Eschen/Mauren	26	10	7	9	51	46	+5	37	
9	(Liechtenstein) FC Balzers	26	10	7	9	39	37	+2	37	
10	FC Seuzach	26	10	4	12	41	45	−4	34	
11	FC Dietikon	26	8	3	15	36	54	−18	27	
12	FC Thalwil	26	5	6	15	24	43	−19	21	
13	FC Lugano U21 (R)	26	5	6	15	31	55	−24	21	Relegation to 2. Liga Interregional
14	AC Taverne (R)	26	4	3	19	24	68	−44	15	Relegation to 2. Liga Interregional

Rules for classification: 1) Points; 2) Goal Difference
(C) Champions; (R) Relegated

== Promotion play-offs ==
Semi-Finals
FC Gossau	1	2	3
FC Stade Lausanne-Ouchy	1	3	4
Yverdon Sport FC	1	1	2
SC Kriens	6	2	8
Zug 94	2	0	2
FC Wettswil-Bonstetten	2	0	2
FC Baden	0	0	0
SC Cham	4	5	9

Finals
FC Stade Lausanne-Ouchy	2	0	2
SC Kriens	2	1	3
FC Wettswil-Bonstetten	2	1	3
SC Cham	5	2	7

SC Kriens and SC Cham were promoted to the 2015–16 1. Liga Promotion.
