= Gianni Antoniazzi =

Swiss footballer (born 1998)

Personal information
- Full name: Gianni Ricardo Antoniazzi
- Date of birth: 5 September 1998 (age 28)
- Place of birth: Glarus, Switzerland
- Height: 1.74 m (5 ft 9 in)
- Position: Defender

Team information
- Current team: FC Tuggen
- Number: 12

Youth career
- 2014–2018: Zürich

Senior career*
Years	Team	Apps	(Gls)
2016–2019	Zürich II	37	(0)
2019	→ Vaduz (loan)	14	(0)
2019–2022	Vaduz	23	(0)
2021	→ Chiasso (loan)	11	(0)
2022–2023	FC Weesen	20	(0)
2023–2025	FC Linth 04	36	(2)
2025–	FC Tuggen	0	(0)

International career^{‡}
2015	Switzerland U17	2	(0)
2015–2016	Switzerland U18	3	(0)
2016–2017	Switzerland U19	2	(0)
- * Club domestic league appearances and goals as of 19 November 2025 ‡ National team caps and goals as of 7 June 2017

Gianni Antoniazzi (born 5 September 1998) is a Swiss footballer who plays for FC Tuggen in the 1. Liga Classic.

== Club career ==
Gianni Antoniazzi is a professional footballer who began his career in the youth system of Swiss League club FC Zürich. He was initially loaned to FC Vaduz from January 2019 until June 2019, at which point the transfer was made permanent. During his time with the Liechtenstein club, Antoniazzi was part of the team that finished as runners-up in the 2019–20 Swiss Challenge League and competed in the UEFA Europa League Qualifying rounds as part of the squad beating Breiðablik and Videoton FC Fehérvár, before being knocked out by Eintracht Frankfurt. He also helped FC Vaduz win the Liechtenstein Football Cup twice, during the 2018–19 and 2021–22 seasons. He was briefly loaned to FC Chiasso from February 2021 until June 2021 before returning to Vaduz.

On 26 August 2022, Antoniazzi signed with FC Weesen in the fourth-tier Swiss 1. Liga, where he played 20 games. Ahead of the 2023–24 season, Antoniazzi transferred to FC Linth 04 in the fifth-tier 2. Liga Interregional, making 36 appearances and scoring his first two professional goals. In May 2025, he joined FC Tuggen alongside Liechtensteiner Sandro Wieser.

== International career ==
Antoniazzi has represented Switzerland at an international level. He was part of the Switzerland U19s team during qualifying for the 2017 UEFA European Under-19 Championship. On the bench for the first two matches, Antoniazzi made his debut for the team in the final qualification match against Italy U19s. In July 2017, Antoniazzi played in the 4–0 victory against Liechtenstein U19s.

== Career statistics ==
=== Club ===
Appearances and goals by club, season and competition
Club	Season	League			Cup		Europe		Total	
Club	Season	Division	Apps	Goals	Apps	Goals	Apps	Goals	Apps	Goals
FC Vaduz	2018–19	Swiss Challenge League	14	0	0	0	—		14	0
FC Vaduz	2019–20	Swiss Challenge League	21	0	0	0	4	0	25	0
FC Vaduz	2020–21	Swiss Challenge League	2	0	0	0	—		0	0
FC Vaduz	2021–22	Swiss Challenge League	0	0	0	0	—		0	0
Total			35	0	0	0	4	0	39	0
Chiasso	2020-21	Swiss Promotion League	11	0	1	0	—		12	0
Total			11	0	1	0	0	0	12	0
FC Weesen	2022-23	1. Liga Classic	20	0	0	0	—		20	0
Total			20	0	0	0	0	0	20	0
FC Linth 04	2023-24	2. Liga Interregional	16	0	1	1	—		17	1
FC Linth 04	2024-25	2. Liga Interregional	18	1	1	0	—		19	1
Total			36	1	2	1	0	0	38	2
FC Tuggen	2025-26	1. Liga Classic	0	0	0	0	—		0	0
Total			0	0	0	0	0	0	0	0
Career total			102	1	3	1	4	0	109	2

=== International career ===
Appearances and goals by national team and year
National team	Year	Apps	Goals
Switzerland U19	2016	1	0
Switzerland U19	2017	1	0

== Honours ==
FC Vaduz

- Swiss Challenge League runner up: 2019-20
- Liechtenstein Football Cup: 2018-19, 2021-22
