= Pajtim Badalli =

Swiss footballer of Albanian descent

Personal information
- Full name: Pajtim Badalli
- Date of birth: 22 December 1991 (age 34)
- Place of birth: Fraifeld, Switzerland
- Height: 1.84 m (6 ft 1/2 in)
- Position: Goalkeeper

Youth career
- 2005–2010: FC Lugano

Senior career*
Years	Team	Apps	(Gls)
2010–2011	FC Chiasso	1	(0)
2011–2013	FC Lugano	1	(0)
2014	Teuta	0	(0)
2014–2015	FC Chiasso	7	(0)
2015	FC Locarno	5	(0)
2016–2017	FC Kosova	33	(0)
2017–2018	FC Collina d'Oro		
- * Club domestic league appearances and goals

Pajtim Badalli (born 22 December 1991, in Fraifeld) is a Swiss footballer of Albanian descent.

== Club career ==
Badalli most recently played as a goalkeeper for FC Collina d'Oro in Switzerland. He has also played for FC Chiasso.

== Personal life ==
His older brother Durim Badalli is a goalkeeper who also plays for FC Tuggen.
