= 2005–06 Swiss Challenge League =

Swiss football league season

The 2005–06 Swiss Challenge League was the third season of the Swiss Challenge League, the second tier of the Swiss football league pyramid. It began on 15 July 2005 and ended on 13 May 2006. The champions of this season, FC Luzern, earned promotion to the 2006–07 Super League. The runners-up FC Sion won the promotion/relegation playoff against the 9th-placed team of the 2005–06 Super League, Neuchâtel Xamax. The bottom tho teams, FC Baden and FC Meyrin, were relegated to the 1. Liga.

== Clubs ==
- FC Baden
- FC Baulmes
- AC Bellinzona
- FC Chiasso
- FC Concordia Basel
- SC YF Juventus
- SC Kriens
- FC La Chaux-de-Fonds
- FC Lausanne-Sport
- FC Locarno
- FC Luzern
- AC Lugano
- FC Meyrin
- FC Sion
- FC Vaduz
- FC Wil
- FC Winterthur
- FC Wohlen

== League table ==
Pos	Team	Pld	W	D	L	GF	GA	GD	Pts	Promotion or relegation
1	FC Luzern (C, P)	34	24	7	3	69	33	+36	79	Promotion to 2006–07 Swiss Super League
2	FC Sion (P)	34	22	6	6	61	24	+37	72	Qualification for Promotion play-off
3	FC Lausanne-Sport	34	20	8	6	64	42	+22	68	
4	FC Chiasso	34	17	8	9	51	31	+20	59	
5	FC La Chaux-de-Fonds	34	15	13	6	60	44	+16	58	
6	FC Wohlen	34	15	7	12	50	40	+10	52	
7	FC Wil	34	14	9	11	61	55	+6	51	
8	FC Vaduz	34	13	7	14	57	54	+3	46	
9	AC Bellinzona	34	12	10	12	43	45	−2	46	
10	AC Lugano	34	10	11	13	41	52	−11	41	
11	FC Baulmes	34	9	13	12	36	45	−9	40	
12	FC Concordia Basel	34	10	9	15	44	57	−13	39	
13	SC Kriens	34	9	12	13	42	56	−14	39	
14	FC Winterthur	34	10	7	17	62	53	+9	37	
15	SC YF Juventus	34	8	14	12	39	53	−14	35 (Note: 3 points deducted?)	
16	FC Locarno	34	7	7	20	35	60	−25	28	
17	FC Baden (R)	34	6	9	19	30	59	−29	27	Relegated to 2006–07 Swiss 1. Liga
18	FC Meyrin (R)	34	1	11	22	26	68	−42	14	Relegated to 2006–07 Swiss 1. Liga

Source: rsssf.com
(C) Champions; (P) Promoted; (R) Relegated

== Results ==
Home \ Away	BAD	BAU	ACB	CHI	CON	YF	SCK	CDF	LS	LOC	FCL	LUG	FCM	FCS	VDZ	WIL	WIN	WOH
FC Baden		2–4	1–1	1–2	1–0	3–1	0–0	0–3	1–2	1–0	1–2	1–1	3–2	0–1	1–0	2–2	0–0	1–2
FC Baulmes	1–0		2–0	2–3	0–1	1–1	2–2	2–2	1–1	2–1	0–1	2–1	1–1	0–1	0–3	2–0	1–3	1–0
AC Bellinzona	2–0	1–1		0–0	0–2	0–0	2–2	0–2	2–2	2–2	0–2	2–0	2–0	1–2	0–0	0–0	3–0	2–0
FC Chiasso	3–0	1–0	0–0		1–1	1–2	0–2	3–0	2–0	1–0	1–1	0–2	2–0	1–0	4–0	0–3	1–1	5–0
FC Concordia Basel	3–1	4–1	2–1	0–0		0–1	2–2	2–2	1–3	4–3	0–1	2–1	4–2	0–1	2–2	1–2	2–1	4–3
SC YF Juventus	3–0	1–1	0–4	1–3	0–0		2–3	2–2	0–1	1–1	1–5	0–0	0–0	0–2	1–0	4–2	0–4	0–1
SC Kriens	2–2	1–0	2–3	0–2	4–1	0–0		0–2	4–2	0–2	0–1	1–2	1–1	0–5	3–2	2–0	1–0	0–2
FC La Chaux-de-Fonds	1–2	1–1	2–4	3–1	1–1	1–1	1–1		1–0	2–1	0–0	4–1	2–0	1–0	0–0	5–3	1–1	2–2
FC Lausanne-Sport	3–1	3–0	3–0	1–0	3–0	1–3	2–0	4–3		2–1	4–1	1–0	1–1	2–2	3–1	3–3	5–4	1–0
FC Locarno	2–1	1–1	0–2	0–1	1–0	3–3	0–2	0–1	1–2		1–4	0–2	1–0	0–2	1–1	3–1	2–0	1–4
FC Luzern	3–0	1–0	1–0	2–1	5–1	3–3	2–2	5–1	1–1	1–0		3–2	3–0	2–1	2–1	2–1	2–0	0–1
AC Lugano	1–1	1–1	2–0	3–1	3–0	3–2	1–1	0–0	1–1	0–0	2–2		4–1	0–3	0–4	0–3	2–1	0–0
FC Meyrin	1–1	0–2	0–2	0–1	2–2	1–4	0–0	2–3	0–0	2–3	2–3	1–2		0–3	2–3	0–0	1–1	2–0
FC Sion	1–0	0–1	4–1	1–1	1–0	4–0	2–0	1–1	1–2	2–1	1–0	3–0	1–0		4–1	2–0	2–0	2–0
FC Vaduz	4–0	4–0	2–4	1–3	1–1	3–1	4–3	0–3	2–1	3–0	3–3	2–1	4–0	0–0		0–1	3–1	0–3
FC Wil	2–0	1–1	0–1	2–5	5–1	0–0	2–0	1–4	3–1	4–2	1–2	2–2	2–2	2–2	2–0		4–3	2–0
FC Winterthur	3–1	1–1	4–0	2–1	1–0	0–1	6–0	2–3	1–2	1–1	0–1	4–0	4–0	4–4	1–2	2–3		2–3
FC Wohlen	1–1	1–1	5–1	0–0	1–0	0–0	1–1	1–0	0–1	5–0	1–2	3–1	3–0	3–0	3–1	1–2	0–4	

Source: rsssf.com
Legend: Blue = home team win; Yellow = draw; Red = away team win.

== Promotion/relegation play-offs ==
The ninth-placed team in the 2005–06 Swiss Super League, Neuchâtel Xamax, played a two-legged play-off against the Challenge League runners-up, Sion, for a spot in the 2006–07 Super League.

18 May 2006
19:30 CEST

Sion	0–0	Neuchâtel Xamax

Stade Tourbillon, Sion
Attendance: 12,300
Referee: Massimo Busacca

21 May 2006
16:00 CEST

Neuchâtel Xamax	0–3	Sion
		Vogt 38', 59'; Gaspoz 68'

Stade de la Maladière, Neuchâtel
Attendance: 7,000
Referee: René Rogalla

Sion won 3–0 on aggregate and are promoted
