= 2004–05 Swiss Challenge League =

Football Tournament

The 2004–05 Swiss Challenge League was the second season of the Swiss Challenge League, and the 73rd season of the second tier of the Swiss football league pyramid. It began on 30 July 2004 and ended on 28 May 2005. The champions of this season, Yverdon-Sport FC, earned promotion to the 2005–06 Super League. FC Bulle finished last and were relegated to the Swiss 1. Liga.

== League table ==
Pos	Team	Pld	W	D	L	GF	GA	GD	Pts	Promotion or relegation
1	Yverdon-Sport FC (C, P)	34	20	10	4	59	26	+33	70	Promotion to 2005–06 Swiss Super League
2	FC Vaduz	34	21	6	7	58	28	+30	69	Qualification for Promotion play-off
3	FC Sion	34	19	11	4	63	33	+30	68	
4	FC Chiasso	34	20	5	9	60	37	+23	65	
5	FC Lucerne	34	19	2	13	73	53	+20	59	
6	AC Bellinzona	34	17	6	11	58	46	+12	57	
7	FC Concordia Basel	34	13	12	9	52	40	+12	51	
8	AC Lugano	34	14	8	12	49	46	+3	50	
9	SC Kriens	34	11	15	8	46	37	+9	48	
10	FC La Chaux-de-Fonds	34	12	7	15	57	56	+1	43	
11	FC Winterthur	34	11	8	15	46	53	−7	41	
12	FC Baulmes	34	12	5	17	31	54	−23	41	
13	FC Wil	34	10	10	14	45	54	−9	40	
14	FC Meyrin	34	9	8	17	39	61	−22	35	
15	FC Wohlen	34	8	7	19	38	63	−25	31	
16	SC YF Juventus	34	8	5	21	43	71	−28	29	
17	FC Baden	34	7	7	20	39	62	−23	28	
18	FC Bulle (R)	34	6	6	22	43	79	−36	24	Relegated to 2005–06 Swiss 1. Liga

(C) Champions; (P) Promoted; (R) Relegated

== Promotion/relegation play-off ==
1 June 2005
19:30 CEST

Schaffhausen	1–1	Vaduz
dos Santos 8'		Zarn 78'

Stadion Breite, Schaffhausen
Attendance: 4,000
Referee: Massimo Busacca

12 June 2005
16:15 CEST

Vaduz	0–1	Schaffhausen
		Senn 73'

Rheinpark Stadion, Vaduz
Attendance: 5,066
Referee: Philippe Leuba

Schaffhausen won 2–1 on aggregate.
