= 1. Liga Classic =

- Founded: 1931; 95 years ago
- Country: Switzerland
- Other club from: Liechtenstein
- Confederation: UEFA
- Number of clubs: 48 (in 3 groups of 16)
- Level on pyramid: 4
- Promotion to: Promotion League
- Relegation to: 2nd League Interregional
- Domestic cup: Swiss Cup
- Current champions: Lausanne-Sport II Grasshopper Club II FC Kreuzlingen (2024–25)
- Current: 2025–26 1. Liga Classic

1. Liga Classic (1st League Classic in English) is the fourth tier of the Swiss football league system. At its creation in 1931, the fourth tier of Swiss football was called 3. Liga. The league is operated by a subdivision of the Swiss Football Association called Erste Liga. It is split into 3 groups of 16 teams, by geographical region.

== Name history ==
The fourth tier of Swiss football has taken on various names over time:

- 1931–1944 : 3. Liga
- 1944–2000 : 2. Liga
- 2000–2012 : 2. Liga Interregional (creation of Swiss Amateur League in 2000)
- 2012–2014 : 1. Liga Classique
- 2014–2022 : 1. Liga
- Since 2022 : 1. Liga Classic

== Regional format ==
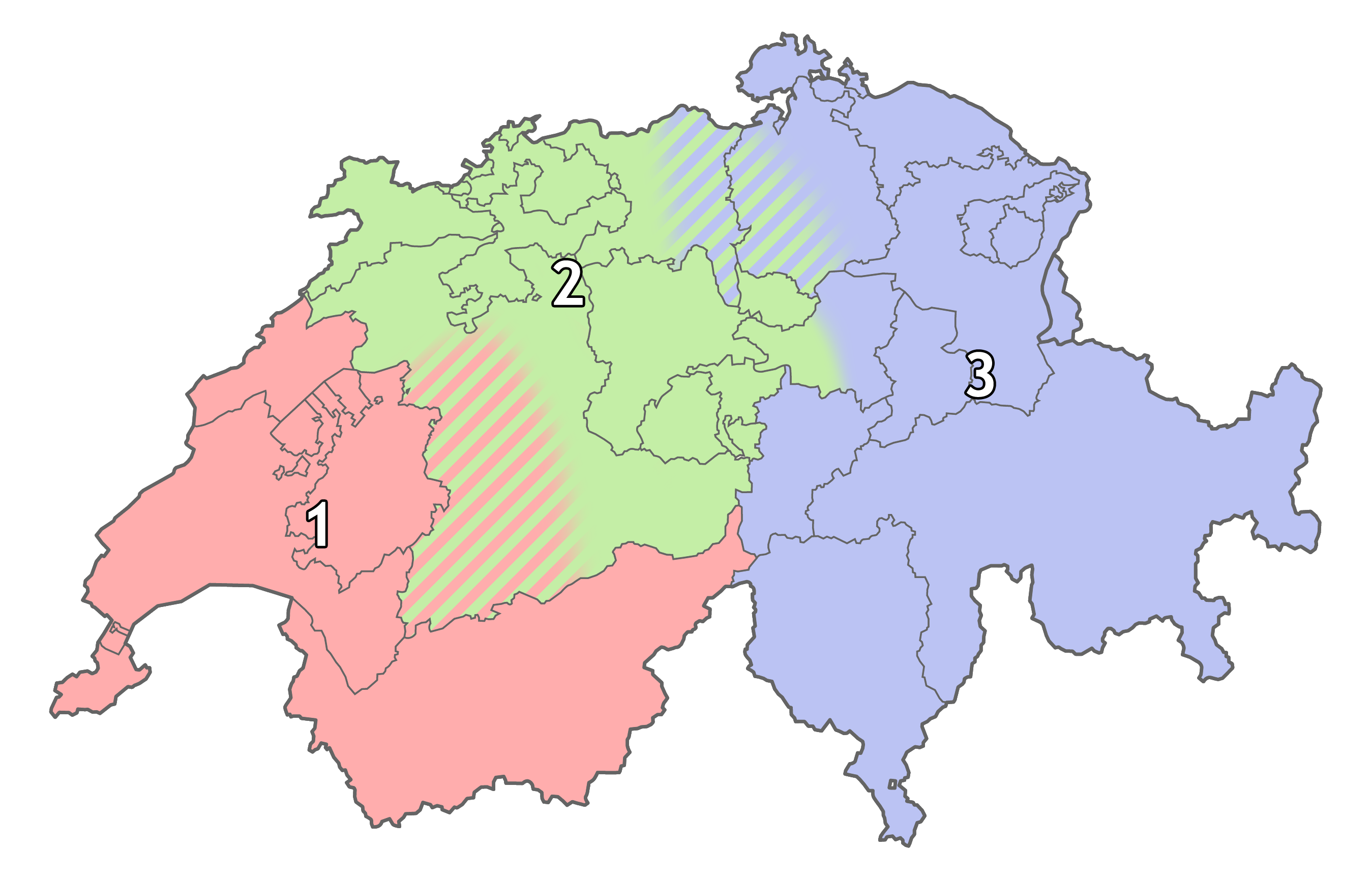
Groups of 1. Liga

Group 1 contains teams from western Switzerland, which is generally French speaking. Group 2 contains teams from Central Switzerland, which is mostly German speaking. Group 3 contains teams from East Switzerland (and Liechtenstein) which contains German and Italian speaking regions.

Two teams in total are promoted at the end of the season to the Promotion League, determined by a play-off competition involving the top 2 teams in each group. The bottom 2 teams in each group are relegated from this division to the 2. Liga Interregional.

== Clubs ==
The clubs in the league for the 2025–26 season will be divided into 3 groups of 16 teams:

=== Group 1 ===
Club	Location
FC Amical Saint-Prex	Saint-Prex
CS Chênois	Thônex
FC Coffrane	Val-de-Ruz
FC Echallens	Echallens
FC La Chaux-de-Fonds	La Chaux-de-Fonds
FC La Sarraz-Eclépens	La Sarraz
Lancy FC	Lancy
FC Martigny-Sports	Martigny
Meyrin FC	Meyrin
FC Monthey	Monthey
FC Oberwallis Naters	Naters
FC Portalban-Gletterens	Delley-Portalban
FC Prishtina Bern	Bern
FC Sion II	Sion
FC Stade-Payerne	Payerne

=== Group 2 ===
Club	Location
FC Bassecourt	Bassecourt
Black Stars Basel	Basel
SC Buochs	Buochs
Concordia Basel	Basel
SR Delémont	Delémont
SC Dornach	Dornach
FC Courtételle	Courtételle
Grasshopper Club II	Zürich
FC Langenthal	Langenthal
FC Münsingen	Münsingen
SV Muttenz	Muttenz
BSC Old Boys	Basel
FC Schötz	Schötz
FC Solothurn	Solothurn
FC Wohlen	Wohlen
Zug 94	Zug

=== Group 3 ===
Club	Location
AC Taverne	Torricella-Taverne
FC Baden	Baden
FC Collilna d'Oro	Collina d'Oro
FC Dietikon	Dietikon
USV Eschen/Mauren	Eschen
FC Freienbach	Freienbach
SV Höngg	Zurich
FC Kosova	Zurich
FC Mendrisio	Mendrisio
SV Schaffhausen	Schaffhausen
FC St. Gallen II	St. Gallen
FC Tuggen	Tuggen
FC Wettswil-Bonstetten	Wettswil am Albis
FC Widnau	Widnau
FC Winterthur II	Winterthur
YF Juventus	Zurich

== League results ==
1st League Classic champions, promoted and relegated teams:

Season	Group 1	Group 2	Group 3	Group 4	Promoted Play-Off Winners	Relegated
1999–2000	Chênois	Wangen bei Olten	Locarno	Vaduz	Wangen bei Olten & Locarno	No Relegation
2000–01	Serrières	Concordia	Vaduz	—	Concordia & Vaduz	No Relegation
2001–02	Colombier	Schaffhausen	Malcantone Agno	—	Wohlen & Schaffhausen	No Relegation
2002–03	Meyrin	YF Juventus	Malcantone Agno	—	Bulle, Chiasso; Malcantone Agno & Meyrin	Rapperswil-Jona & Stade Nyonnais
2003–04	Étoile-Carouge	YF Juventus	Locarno	—	YF Juventus & Baulmes	FC Altstetten & Vevey Sports
2004–05	Lausanne-Sport	Biel-Bienne	Tuggen	—	Lausanne-Sport & Locarno	No Relegation
2005–06	Servette	Biel-Bienne	Tuggen	—	Delémont & Servette	No Relegation
2006–07	Étoile-Carouge	Basel U-21	Red Star Zürich	—	Cham & Gossau	No Relegation
2007–08	Nyon	Basel U-21	Baden	—	Biel-Bienne & Stade Nyonnais	FC Brugg & SC Zofingen
2008–09	Étoile-Carouge	Basel U-21	Chiasso	—	Le Mont & Kriens	Red Star Zürich & FC La Tour/Le Pâquier
2009–10	Sion U-21	YF Juventus	Chiasso	—	Chiasso & Delémont	SC Cham & FC Emmenbrücke
2010–11	Meyrin	Schötz	Brühl	—	Brühl & Étoile-Carouge	SC Bümpliz 78, CS Chênois, US Terre-Sainte, FC Laufen, SC Buochs & Zug 94
2011–12	FC Sion II	BSC Old Boys	FC Tuggen	—	11 promoted clubs	No Relegation
2012–13	FC Le Mont	FC Baden	SC Cham	—	FC Le Mont & FC Köniz	UGS Genève, ES FC Malley, SV Muttenz, SC Dornach, FC Kreuzlingen & CS Biaschesi
2013–14	SC Düdingen	Neuchâtel Xamax	USV Eschen/Mauren	—	Neuchâtel Xamax & FC Rapperswil-Jona	FC Bulle, SC Zofingen, FC Thun II, Chur 97 & SV Höngg
2014–15	FC Stade Lausanne-Ouchy	SC Cham	FC Wettswil-Bonstetten	—	SC Cham & SC Kriens	FC Meyrin, FC Monthey, Concordia Basel, FC Grenchen, FC Lugano II & AC Taverne
2015–16	FC Stade Lausanne-Ouchy	FC Münsingen	FC Baden	—	FC Bavois, FC La Chaux-de-Fonds & FC United Zürich	Signal FC Bernex-Confignon, US Terre-Sainte, FC Bern, FC Dietikon & FC Kosova
2016–17	Yverdon Sport FC	FC Luzern II	FC Gossau	—	Yverdon Sport FC & FC Stade Lausanne-Ouchy	FC La Sarraz-Eclépens, FC Wangen bei Olten, FC Muri, FC Seefeld & Locarno
2017–18	BSC Young Boys II	FC Solothurn	AC Bellinzona	—	AC Bellinzona & FC Münsingen	SC Guin, FC Portalban-Gletterens, FC Sursee, Kickers Luzern, FC Seuzach & FC Balzers
2018–19	Etoile Carouge FC	Black Stars	FC Baden	—	Etoile Carouge FC & Black Stars	FC Thun II, FC Fribourg, SC Zofingen, BSC Old Boys, FC Mendrisio & FC United Zürich
2019–20	FC Lausanne-Sport II	SR Delemont	FC Tuggen	—	No Promotion	No Relegation
2020–21	BSC Young Boys II	FC Biel-Bienne	FC Wettswil-Bonstetten	—	BSC Young Boys II & FC Biel-Bienne	FC Azzurri 90, Olympique de Genève FC, SV Muttenz, Gossau, Red Star Zürich & FC Dietikon
2021–22	BSC Young Boys II	FC Biel-Bienne	FC Tuggen	—	FC Baden, FC Bulle, FC Luzern II & St. Gallen II	Team Vaud, Lancy FC, Zug 94, SC Buochs, FC Thalwil & FC Balzers
2022–23	Servette FC II	SR Delémont	FC Paradiso	—	Servette FC II, SR Delémont, FC Paradiso & FC Lugano II	FC Concordia Lausanne, FC Martigny-Sports, FC Muri AG, SC Dornach, FC Uzwil & FC Weesen
2023–24	FC Grand-Saconnex	FC Schötz	FC Tuggen	—	Grand-Saconnex & Vevey-Sports	Pully Football, US Terre-Sainte, FC Emmenbrücke, FC Muri, FC Balzers & FC Gossau
2024–25	FC Lausanne-Sport II	Grasshopper Club II	Kreuzlingen	—	Lausanne-Sport II & Kreuzlingen	FC Köniz, FC Linth 04, FC Rotkreuz, FC Thun II, FC Uzwil, Yverdon-Sport II
2025–26				—		

== See also ==
- Category:1. Liga Classic players
- Category:1. Liga Classic players
