= Stadion Birchhölzli =

Association football stadium in Düdingen, Switzerland

Stadion Birchhölzli is a football stadium in Düdingen, Switzerland. It is the home ground of SC Düdingen and has a capacity of 1,500.

== See also ==
- List of football stadiums in Switzerland
