= FC Chur 97 =

Swiss football club

- Full name: Fussballclub Chur 97
- Founded: 1997; 28 years ago
- Ground: Ringstrasse
- Capacity: 1,820
- Chairman: Antonello Gialluca
- Coach: Aleksandar Zarkovic
- League: 2. Liga Interregional
- 2024–25: Group 4, 13th of 16
Home colours	Away colours

Fussballclub Chur 97 is a Swiss football club from Chur, canton of Grisons. The team currently play in 2. Liga Interregional, the fifth tier of Swiss football.

== History ==
FC Chur 97 was founded in 1997 as a merger of FC Chur, FC Neustadt and SC Grischuna. Predecessor club FC Chur played in the second tier league (National League B) from 1987 to 1993.
