= Grand-Lancy FC =

Swiss football club

- Full name: Grand-Lancy Football Club
- Founded: 1943
- Dissolved: 30 June 2012
- Ground: Stade de Marignac, Grand Lancy
- Capacity: 1,500
- League: 1. Liga
- 2011/2012: 7th, 2. Liga Interregional
Home colours	Away colours

Grand-Lancy Football Club was a Swiss football team from Grand Lancy. They last playing in Liga 1., the 3rd tier in the Swiss football pyramid Group 1.

The club was formed in 1943. They finished the 2008–2009 season in 1st-place resulting in Promotion to 1. Liga. In 2011 they reached the 2nd round of the Swiss Cup where they would play against FC Luzern of the Swiss Super League. In summer 2012, they filed for bankruptcy and were dissolved by Swiss Football Association. The new club was founded with plays of Lancy Sports and Grand Lancy, as FC Lancy.
