= SC Zofingen =

Association football club

- Full name: SC Zofingen
- Founded: 1896
- Ground: Sportanlagen Trinermatten, Zofingen, Switzerland
- Capacity: 2,000 (670 seated
- Chairman: Pietro di Natale
- Manager: Nicola Nocita
- League: 1. Liga
- 2017–18: 2. Liga Interregional, 1st (promoted)
- Website: https://www.sczofingen.ch
Home colours	Away colours

SC Zofingen is a Swiss football club based in Zofingen, Canton Aargau which is a short distance from Zürich. It was founded on 10 August 1896. They currently play in the Swiss 1. Liga, the third tier of Swiss football.

== History ==
In 1971 the club were promoted to the Challenge League, the 2nd tier of the Swiss football pyramid. In 1973 the club were relegated to the third tier and the following year into the fourth tier. In 1984 the club were promoted to the Swiss 1. Liga. In 1989 the club won the Swiss 1. Liga but could not move into the Challenge League as their stadium was not good enough. In 1990 the club were again champions of the Swiss 1. Liga but failed to win the play off match and so were not promoted. In a dramatic game against FC Kölliken in Lenzburg the club missed a penalty and eventually lost 1–0.

== Current squad ==
As of 3 June 2018

Note: Flags indicate national team as defined under FIFA eligibility rules; some limited exceptions apply. Players may hold more than one non-FIFA nationality.

No.	Pos.	Nation	Player
1	GK	ITA	Alessandro Vodola
2	DF	SUI	Simon Hunziker
3	DF	SUI	Denis Emmenegger
4	MF	SUI	Manuel Weber
5	DF	POL	Dawid Skrzypczak
6	MF	CZE	Michal Rakovan
7	FW	SUI	Matteo Muscia
8	MF	SUI	Oliver Jonjić
9	FW	SUI	Aadil Ajil
10	MF	CRO	Robert Majić
11	FW	BRA	Julio Sant Anna
13	DF	SUI	Mike Sieber

No.	Pos.	Nation	Player
14	MF	SUI	Mauro Noordijk
17	MF	CRO	Marco Granata
18	MF	SVK	Martin Válovčan
19	MF	POR	Ruben Rodrigues Machado
20	FW	ALB	Kushtrim Osaj
21	FW	SUI	Nedim Brzina
22	FW	BRA	Wellington
24	GK	SUI	Gianluca Accola
88	MF	SUI	Almedin Hodžićn
—	DF	ARG	José Luis Mamone
—	FW	SUI	Michel Lässer

== Stadium ==
The club play at Sportanlagen Trinermatten, which opened in 1974. The stadium has one covered grandstand with seating for 670.
