= SC Dornach =

Swiss association football club

- Full name: Sport Club Dornach
- Founded: 1 July 1920; 105 years ago
- Ground: Gigersloch
- Capacity: 2,500
- Chairman: Stefan Schindelholz
- Manager: Nikola Veselinovic
- Coach: Arjan Peço
- League: 2. Liga Interregional
- 2024—25: Group 2, 6th of 16

SC Dornach is a Swiss football team from Dornach, Switzerland. The team currently play in the 2. Liga Interregional, the fifth tier of Swiss football.

== History ==
SC Dornach was founded in 1920.
