= Espenmoos =

Football stadium in St. Gallen, Switzerland

- Interactive map of Espenmoos
- Full name: Espenmoos Stadium
- Location: St. Gallen, Switzerland
- Coordinates: 47°26′17″N 9°23′47″E

Construction
- Built: 1910

Tenant
- FC St. Gallen (1910–2008)

Espenmoos Stadium, is a football stadium in St. Gallen, Switzerland. It was the home ground of the FC St. Gallen until their current stadium Kybunpark opened in 2008. The stadium has since been demolished except for the main seated stand.
