= Stade Universitaire Saint-Léonard =

- Interactive map of Stade Universitaire Saint-Léonard
- Location: Fribourg, Switzerland
- Coordinates: 46.817°N 7.154°E
- Capacity: 9,000

Tenant
- FC Fribourg

Stade Universitaire Saint-Léonard is a stadium in Fribourg, Switzerland, located next to Patinoire Saint-Léonard. It is currently used for football matches and is the home ground of FC Fribourg. The capacity is 9,000, consisting of 1000 seats and 8,000 standing places.
