= FC Baulmes =

Swiss football club

- Full name: FC Baulmes
- Nickname: FCB
- Founded: 1940
- Ground: Stade Sous-Ville, Baulmes, Switzerland
- Capacity: 2,500 (500 seated)
- Manager: Jochen Dries
- League: 1. Liga
Home colours	Away colours

FC Baulmes (FCB) is a Swiss football club based in Baulmes in canton Vaud. The club currently plays in the 1. Liga. It is most notable for briefly playing in the Challenge League. For three seasons from 2004 to 2009, it remained in the second-highest Swiss football league, an anomaly for a village of just over a thousand people. Shortly after its relegation, the club went bankrupt, its financial problems caused in part by a costly CHF 3.5 million stadium construction project. In June 2012, the club's chairman was convicted of fraud and received a 15-month suspended prison sentence; his trustee was similarly convicted. Its financial struggles continued until the 2021–2022 season, when it could not put together a senior team. The club has since begun a recovery under new management.
