= Sportanlage Sandreutenen =

Stadium in Münsingen, Switzerland

Sportanlage Sandreutenen is a stadium in Münsingen, Switzerland. It is currently used for football matches and is the home ground of FC Münsingen. The capacity is 1,400. The stadium has 200 seats and 1,200 standing places.

The stadium record attendance is 4'100 spectators and was made during a Swiss Cup tie on 14 September 2013. In 2013–14 Swiss Cup second round match between FC Münsingen and FC Basel as Basel won 1:0.
