= Linthstrasse =

Linthstrasse is a stadium in Tuggen, Canton Schwyz, Switzerland. It is currently used for football matches and is the home ground of FC Tuggen. The capacity is 2,800 spectators, with 300 seats and 2,500 standing places.

== See also ==
- List of football stadiums in Switzerland
