= Stadion FC Solothurn =

Football stadium in Switzerland

Coordinates: 47.20639°N 7.52078°E

Stadion FC Solothurn is a football stadium in Solothurn, Switzerland. It is the home ground of FC Solothurn and has a capacity of 6,750.
