= FC Münsingen =

Swiss football club

- Full name: Fussballclub Münsingen
- Founded: 1928; 98 years ago
- Ground: Sportanlage Sandreutenen, Münsingen, Switzerland
- Capacity: 1,400 (200 seated)
- President: Andreas Zwahlen
- Manager: Daniel Klossner
- League: 1. Liga Classic
- 2024–25: Group 2, 7th of 16
Home colours	Away colours

FC Münsingen is a Swiss football club from the town of Münsingen in the canton of Bern in Switzerland. The team currently plays in the 1. Liga Classic, the fourth tier in the Swiss football pyramid.

== History ==
Among the sporting highlights of the recent past include Swiss Cup matches against Super League teams Neuchâtel Xamax in 1992 and FC Basel in 1996.

At the end of the 2007/08 season the club narrowly missed out on promotion to the Challenge League.

== Stadium ==
The club play their home games at Sportanlage Sandreutenen. The capacity is 1,400. The stadium has 200 seats and 1,200 standing places.
