= FC Schötz =

Swiss football club

Schötz
- Full name: Fussballclub Schötz
- Founded: 1927
- Ground: Sportplatz Wissenhusen; Schötz
- Capacity: 1,750
- Chairman: Sven Christ
- Manager: Sascha Birrer
- League: Swiss 1. Liga
Home colours	Away colours

Fussballclub Schötz is a football club from Schötz, Switzerland.

The club, founded in 1927, is currently playing in the Swiss 1. Liga.

== Current squad ==
As of 10 April, 2026. Note: Flags indicate national team as defined under FIFA eligibility rules; some limited exceptions apply. Players may hold more than one non-FIFA nationality.

No.	Pos.	Nation	Player
1	GK	SUI	David Schädeli
2	DF	FRA	Mory Karamoko
3	DF	FRA	Roland Pokua
5	MF	SUI	Nando Bühler
6	DF	SUI	Massimo Bühler
7	MF	SUI	Diogo Costa
8	MF	BIH	Emrah Isic
9	DF	SUI	Mile Vukelic
10	MF	SUI	Stephan Andrist
11	FW	SUI	Fabian Rüedi
12	DF	SUI	Manuel Roth
13	MF	FRA	Ilyes Benaziza
14	MF	SUI	Almedin Hodzic

No.	Pos.	Nation	Player
15	MF	SUI	Eliess Rölli
16	MF	GER	Fitim Fejza
17	MF	SUI	Michael Schär
18	GK	POR	João Pedro
19	FW	SUI	Luca Frey
21	FW	GRE	Rafail Tsolakis
22	DF	MAR	Houssam Tafzati
23	DF	SUI	Nikola Mijatovic
24	FW	ITA	Loris Vernocchi
27	MF	SUI	Cyrill Gehrig
28	DF	CRO	Ivan Harambašić
30	GK	SUI	Lenny Heller
31	MF	SUI	Ryan Hügi
77	FW	FRA	Presley Pululu
