= FC Tuggen =

Swiss football club

- Full name: Fussball Club Tuggen
- Founded: 1966; 60 years ago
- Ground: Linthstrasse, Tuggen, Schwyz, Switzerland
- Capacity: 2,800 (300 seated
- President: Felix Huber
- Head Coach: Ivan Previtali
- League: 1. Liga Classic
- 2024–25: Group 3, 7th of 16
Home colours	Away colours

FC Tuggen is a Swiss football club from the town of Tuggen in Canton Schwyz, the German-speaking region of Switzerland. The club was founded in 1966 and currently plays in 1. Liga Classic, the fourth tier of Swiss football pyramid.

== History ==
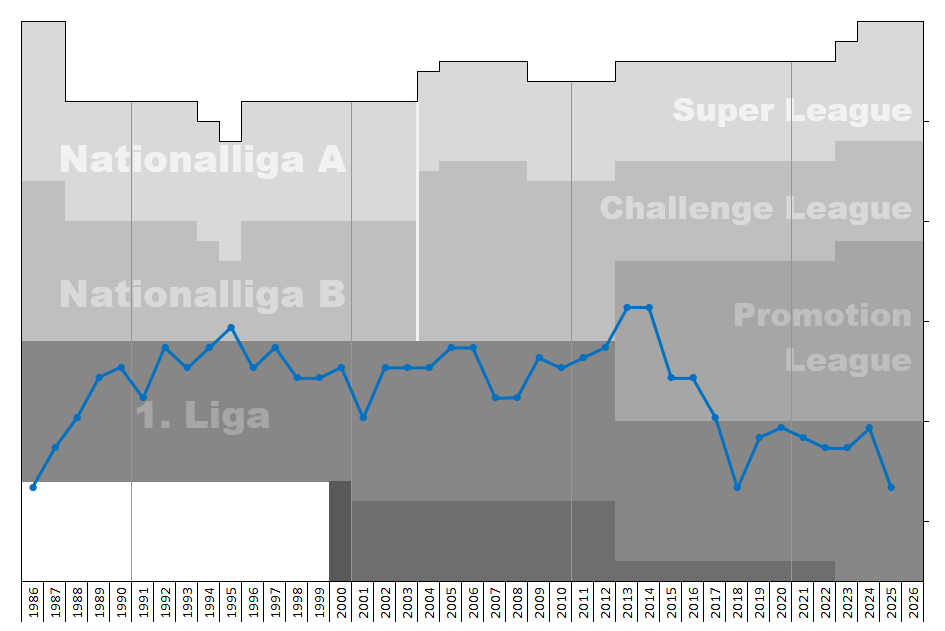
Chart of FC Tuggen table positions in the Swiss football league system

The club was founded on 11 November 1966 as SC Tuggen. In 1976 the club changed its name to FC Tuggen. In 1991, the club reached the quarter-finals of the Swiss Cup, losing 4–0 to FC Chiasso.

=== Stadium ===
Tuggen play its home games in the stadium Linthstrasse. The capacity is 2,800 spectators, with 300 seats and 2,500 standing places.

== Current squad ==
As of 6 March, 2026. Note: Flags indicate national team as defined under FIFA eligibility rules; some limited exceptions apply. Players may hold more than one non-FIFA nationality.

No.	Pos.	Nation	Player
1	GK	SUI	Miroslav Dabić
3	DF	NED	Bjorn Bonthuis
4	DF	SUI	Nikola Vasic
5	MF	SUI	Jonas Rüegg
6	MF	SUI	Silvan Kriz
7	FW	KOS	Dardan Morina
8	MF	SUI	José Meier
9	FW	MKD	Jakup Jakupov
10	MF	FRA	Nathan Tayey
11	FW	SUI	Michael Bärtsch
12	DF	SUI	Gianni Antoniazzi
14	MF	SUI	Eray Erbinel

No.	Pos.	Nation	Player
15	FW	SUI	Altin Ramabaja
16	DF	ROU	Andrei Herlea (captain)
17	MF	SUI	Alessandro Kräuchi
18	MF	KOS	Haxhi Shala
19	MF	SUI	Nando Rüegg
20	MF	SUI	Kevin Quintas
21	MF	SUI	Argtim Ismaili
22	FW	BRA	Fernando Rodrigues
23	DF	SUI	Caine Keller
24	DF	SUI	Edvin Osmani
28	GK	GUA	Joel Balzer

=== Staff ===
- Ivan Previtali – Head Coach
- Javier Santana – Assistant Coach
- Urs Meier – Goalkeeper Coach
- Gjevat Ponik – Team Caretaker
- Katharina Meyer – Physio
- Reto Bartholet – Masseur
