= FC Wangen bei Olten =

Swiss football club

Wangen b.O.
- Full name: FC Wangen bei Olten
- Founded: 12 April 1930
- Ground: Sportplatz Chrüzmatt, Switzerland
- Capacity: 3,000 (300 seats 2,700 standing)
- Manager: Edvaldo Della Casa
- League: 1. Liga (Group 2)
- 2006–07: 1. Liga (Group 2), 8th
- Website: www.fcwangen.com
Home colours	Away colours

FC Wangen bei Olten is a Swiss football club based in Wangen bei Olten. The club has played in Nationalliga B (2nd level), and currently plays at 1. Liga (Group 2) (4th level).

== Recent seasons ==
- 2000–01: Nationalliga B 7th in Abstiegsrunde (relegated)
- 2001–07: 1. Liga

== Stadium ==
The club play their home games in Sportplatz Chrüzmatt. It has a capacity of 3,000. 300 are seating and 2,700 is for standing.

== Current squad ==
Note: Flags indicate national team as defined under FIFA eligibility rules; some limited exceptions apply. Players may hold more than one non-FIFA nationality.

No.	Pos.	Nation	Player
1	GK	SUI	Marco Häfliger
31	GK	SUI	André Grob
2	DF	SUI	Sertac Arabaci
3	DF	MKD	Aleksandar Milushev
4	DF	KOS	Blerim Bekteshi
5	DF	SUI	Faton Hajdari
7	DF	KOS	Kaltrim Osaj
13	DF	SUI	Claudio Zimmerli
19	DF	KOS	Driton Tahiri
6	MF	KOS	Besart Xhema
7	MF	KOS	Kaltrim Osaj
8	MF	BRA	Alan Nabarro

No.	Pos.	Nation	Player
11	MF	CMR	Jordan Otomo
14	MF	POR	Daniel Brito
17	MF	TUR	Ahmet Ceker
19	MF	KOS	Driton Tahiri
20	MF	SUI	Hasan Ates
27	MF	BRA	Guto
28	MF	SUI	Hammam Ghaith
29	MF	SUI	Jeol Rietschin
9	FW	MKD	Cvetan Čurlinov
10	FW	SUI	Avni Halimi
15	FW	SUI	Syart Bala
16	FW	MKD	Dragan Gjorgiev

Coach : Edvaldo Della Casa (Brazil)
