= FC Echallens =

Swiss football club

Échallens Région
- Full name: Football Club Échallens Région
- Founded: 1 July 1921; 105 years ago
- Ground: Stade des Trois Sapins, Échallens
- Capacity: 3,000
- President: Fritz Aeschbach
- Coach: Fábio Almeida
- League: 1. Liga Classic
- 2024–25: Group 1, 6th of 16
Home colours	Away colours

FC Échallens Région, commonly known as Échallens Région is a Swiss football club from Echallens, canton of Vaud. The team currently play in 1. Liga Classic, fourth tier of Swiss football pyramid. The club was formed in 1921.

== Crest ==
Former logo (–2013)

FC Échallens Région change logo from 2013.

== Stadium ==
FC Echallens play their home games at Stade des 3 Sapins in Echallens. The capacity is 3,000 and is the opposite of the modern all seater stadiums in that it is standing-room only.

== Current squad ==
As of 10 April, 2026. Note: Flags indicate national team as defined under FIFA eligibility rules; some limited exceptions apply. Players may hold more than one non-FIFA nationality.

No.	Pos.	Nation	Player
1	GK	SUI	Živko Kostadinović
3	DF	SUI	Jordane Agodey
4	DF	SUI	Ahmet Özcan
6	MF	SUI	Lucas Valle
7	FW	SUI	Jonathan Lima
8	MF	SUI	Arnaud Morard
9	FW	SUI	Baptiste Bersier
10	DF	POR	Stephane Gomes
11	FW	SUI	Ben Käser
12	MF	SUI	Ertan Ali
14	MF	HAI	Julien Joseph

No.	Pos.	Nation	Player
15	DF	COD	Diego Mutombo
16	MF	SUI	Nathan Jaton
17	FW	ESP	Hugo Lopez
18	GK	SUI	Sébastien Burgat
19	MF	SUI	Théo Rochat
20	MF	ITA	Eric Jorge
22	FW	COD	Djove Ifaso
23	FW	SUI	Danilo Ianigro
24	DF	SUI	Tristan Chavanne
25	DF	SUI	Diogo Dos Santos
26	DF	SUI	Fabien Champion
