= 1949–50 Swiss Cup =

Tournament details
- Country: Switzerland

Final positions
- Champions: Lausanne-Sport
- Runners-up: Cantonal Neuchâtel

The 1949–50 Swiss Cup was the 25th season of Switzerland's football cup competition, organised annually since the 1925–26 season by the Swiss Football Association.

== Overview ==
This season's cup competition began with the first round, which was played on the week-end of the 11 September 1949. The competition was to be completed on Easter Monday, 10 April 1950, with the final, which, since 1937, was traditionally held at the former Wankdorf Stadium in Bern. As the final ended in a draw a replay was required and this was held on Ascension Thursday 18 May. The clubs from the 1949–50 Swiss 1. Liga were given a bye for the first round, they joined the competition in the second round on the week-end of 2 October. The clubs from this season's Nationalliga A (NLA) and from this season's Nationalliga B (NLB) were given byes for the first two rounds. These teams joined the competition in the third round, which was played on the week-end of 30 October.

The matches were played in a knockout format. In the event of a draw after 90 minutes, the match went into extra time. In the event of a draw at the end of extra time, a replay was foreseen and this was played on the visiting team's pitch. If the replay ended in a draw after extra time, a toss of a coin would establish the team that qualified for the next round.

== Round 1 ==
In the first round, the lower league teams that had qualified themselves for the competition through their regional football association's regional cup competitions or their association's requirements, competed here. Whenever possible, the draw respected local regionalities. The games of the first round were played on Saturday 11 September 1949.

=== Summary ===
Team 1	Score	Team 2
11 September 1949
SV Ceresio Schaffhausen	4–0	Frauenfeld
FC Uzwil	2–1	Gossau
Chur	4–1	FC Ems
FC Widnau	2–0	FC Amriswil
FC Lachen	3–2	FC Schmerikon
FC Adliswil	4–0	FC Schlieren (ZH)
FC Oerlikon (ZH)	8–0	FC Albisrieden
Post Zürich	1–2	Ballspielclub Zürich
SV Seebach	0–2	FC Töss
FC Tössfeld	1–2	FC Rüti (ZH)
FC Aegerten-Brügg	4–4 (a.e.t.)	FC Viktoria Bern
FC Tavannes	6–3	FC Luterbach
FC Selzach	2–4	Wacker Grenchen
FC Ticino Bern	1–8	US Bienne-Boujean
FC Langnau im Emmental	3–1	FC Grünstern (Ipsach)
Köniz	5–1	FC Interlaken
Bümpliz	4–1	FC Bözingen 34
Black Stars	1–0 (a.e.t.)	FC Gerlafingen
FC Allschwil	1–1 (a.e.t.)	FC Gelterkinden
FC Riehen	5–0	FC Reinach (BL)
FC Courtemaîche	3–2	Binningen
FC Trimbach	6–2	FC Suhr
FC Lenzburg	2–1	FC Brugg
FC Weisslingen	1–4	FC Polizei Zürich
FC Altdorf (Uri)	4–1	Luzerner SC
FC Renens	4–0	FC Orbe
Racing Club Lausanne	0–1	FC Vallorbe
FC Forward Morges	2–0	FC Stade Payerne
Martigny-Sports	14–0	FC Aigle
FC Broc	3–3 (a.e.t.)	Bulle
CA Genève	0–0 (a.e.t.)	Chênois
FC Saint-Maurice	2–0	Monthey
FC Auvernier	1–5	FC Floria
FC La Neuveville	3–2	FC Peseux Comète

Replays

Team 1	Score	Team 2
18 September 1949
FC Gelterkinden	1–2	FC Allschwil
25 September 1949
FC Victoria Bern	6–2	FC Aegerten-Brügg
Bulle	2–0	FC Broc
Chênois	2–1	CA Genève

== Round 2 ==
The clubs from the 1949–50 1. Liga had been given a bye for the first round, these teams now joined the competition here, in the second round.

=== Summary ===
Team 1	Score	Team 2
2 October 1949
CS International Genève	2–0	Chênois
FC Renens	2–1	FC Gardy-Jonction (GE)
FC Vallorbe	0–5	ES Malley
FC Forward Morges	1–0	FC Sierre
Martigny-Sports	1–2	FC Ambrosiana Lausanne
Stade Lausanne	3–6	FC Saint-Maurice
FC Floria	1–0	Yverdon-Sport
Stade Nyonnais	4–1	Bulle
FC La Neuveville	5–3	Saint-Imier-Sports
FC Victoria Bern	1–4	Vevey Sports
CS La Tour-de-Peilz	2–0	Köniz
Montreux-Sports	3–1	Bümpliz
FC Langnau im Emmental	3–6	Central Fribourg
Lengnau	5–0	US Bienne-Boujean
Solothurn	5–0	Wacker Grenchen
FC Birsfelden	4–1	Black Stars
FC Allschwil	0–3	FC Porrentruy
FC Riehen	2–3 (a.e.t.)	FC Pratteln
FC Trimbach	6–4 (a.e.t.)	Concordia
SC Derendingen	1–0	FC Lenzburg
FC Adliswil	0–0 (a.e.t.)	FC Olten
Polizei Zürich	2–0	Zofingen
Uster	5–0	FC Oerlikon (ZH)
Schöftland	2–0	Ballspielclub Zürich
Red Star	4–4 (a.e.t.)	FC Töss
Blue Stars	4–0	FC Lachen
FC Rüti (ZH)	3–3 (a.e.t.)	FC Altstetten (Zürich)
Winterthur	6–0	SV Ceresio Schaffhausen
FC Uzwil	2–6	Schaffhausen
Chur	4–6	FC Wil
Arbon	1–2	FC Widnau
FC Altdorf (Uri)	0–1	Kreuzlingen
Baden	4–0	Lamone Sportiva
Biaschesi	2–0	Emmenbrücke
FC Courtemaîche	1–5	SC Kleinhüningen

Replays

Team 1	Score	Team 2
16 October 1949
FC Olten	5–1	FC Adliswil
FC Töss	1–2	Red Star
FC Altstetten (Zürich)	4–2 (a.e.t.)	FC Rüti (ZH)

== Round 3 ==
The teams from this season's NLA and this season's NLB entered the cup competition in this round. However, the teams from the NLA were seeded and could not be drawn against each other. Whenever possible, the draw respected local regionalities. The third round was played on the week-end of 30 October.

=== Summary ===
Team 1	Score	Team 2
30 October 1949
Grasshopper Club	9–1	Uster
FC Porrentruy	1–2	Basel
Brühl	1–3	FC Wil
Nordstern	3–0	FC Birsfelden
Bellinzona	9–1	Polizei Zürich
FC Widnau	1–2	SC Zug
Biel-Bienne	4–1	Schöftland
Thun	1–2	Lengnau
Bern	4–3	La Neuveville
Vevey Sports	9–2	FC Floria
Grenchen	5–1	FC Pratteln
Lausanne-Sport	4–1	CS International Genève
Lugano	9–0	Biaschesi
Young Fellows	4–0	FC Olten
Locarno	2–1	FC Altstetten (Zürich)
SC Kleinhüningen	0–1	Aarau
Baden	4–1	Solothurn
Luzern	4–0	Winterthur
Schaffhausen	1–0	Chiasso
Blue Stars	0–3	Mendrisio
Kreuzlingen	0–6	Zürich
FC Saint-Maurice	0–3	Servette
FC Forward Morges	0–1	Urania Genève Sport
Fribourg	3–0	SC Derendingen
Central Fribourg	2–4 (a.e.t.)	La Chaux-de-Fonds
Étoile-Sporting	2–1 (a.e.t.)	Montreux-Sports
FC Ambrosiana Lausanne	2–0	Stade Nyonnais
Cantonal Neuchâtel	1–0	FC Renens
FC Trimbach	3–4	Young Boys
ES Malley	4–3 (a.e.t.)	CS La Tour-de-Peilz
Red Star	1–1 (a.e.t.)	St. Gallen
FC Helvetia Bern	1–1 (a.e.t.)	Moutier

Replay

Team 1	Score	Team 2
13 November 1949
St. Gallen	2–1	Red Star
Moutier	2–1	FC Helvetia Bern

=== Matches ===
30 October 1949

FC Porrentruy	1–2	Basel
N. Adam 86' (1:2)	FCB summary	37' (0:1) Hügi (I); 79' (0:2) Stäuble

Stade du Tirage, Porrentruy
Attendance: 3,200
Referee: (Switzerland) Paul von Wartburg (Bern)

30 October 1949

SC Kleinhüningen	0–1	Aarau
	FCA summary	Goal

Rankhof, Basel

30 October 1949

Kreuzlingen	0–6	Zürich
	FCZ summary	3' (0:1) Guerini; 23' (pen.) Hotz; 25' (0:3) Zanetti; 40' (0:4) Hotz; 80' (0:5) Bosshard; 88' (0:6) Zanetti

Sportplatz an der Konstanzerstrasse, Kreuzlingen
Attendance: 900
Referee: (Switzerland) Keller (Seuzach)

30 October 1949

FC Saint-Maurice	0–3	Servette
	Servette summary	(0:1) Fatton (0:2) Fatton (0:3) Eggimann

Stade du Camp du Scex, Saint-Maurice, Switzerland

== Round 4 ==
=== Summary ===
Team 1	Score	Team 2
27 November 1949
Grasshopper Club	1–2	Basel
FC Wil	1–0	Nordstern
Biel-Bienne	2–0	Lengnau
Bern	1–0	Vevey Sports
Grenchen	1–4	Lausanne-Sport
St. Gallen	1–0	Lugano
Young Fellows	5–1	Locarno
Aarau	1–2	Baden
Luzern	3–1	Schaffhausen
Servette	4–2 (a.e.t.)	Urania Genève Sport
Fribourg	3–1	La Chaux-de-Fonds
Étoile-Sporting	3–2 (a.e.t.)	FC Ambrosiana Lausanne
Cantonal Neuchâtel	2–1	Young Boys
Moutier	0–4	ES Malley
Bellinzona	ppd	SC Zug
Mendrisio	ppd	Zürich

Replays

Team 1	Score	Team 2
18 December 1949
Bellinzona	5–0	SC Zug
26 December 1949
Mendrisio	2–6	Zürich

=== Matches ===
27 November 1949
12:30

Grasshopper Club	1–2	Basel
Bickel 2' (1:0)	FCB summary	5' (1:1) Bader; 50' (1:2) Hügi (I)

Hardturm, Zürich
Attendance: 16,000
Referee: (Switzerland) Maurice Tasca (Geneva)

27 November 1949

Aarau	1–2	Baden
Goal	FCA summary	Goal

Stadion Brügglifeld, Aarau

27 November 1949

Servette	4–2 (a.e.t.)	Urania Genève Sport
Fatton; Fatton; Fatton (3:2); Fatton (4:2)	Servette summary	Goal

Stade des Charmilles, Geneva

26 December 1949

Mendrisio	2–6	Zürich
Riva 66' (1:3); Alberto Bernasconi 68' (pen.)	FCZ summary	(0:1) Guerini (0:2) Zanetti; 54' (0:3) Zanetti; 77' (2:4) Schneiter; 82' (2:5) Schneiter; 86' (2:6) Bosshard

Centro Sportivo Comunale, Mendrisio
Attendance: 2,500
Referee: (Switzerland) Armand Merlotti (Neuchâtel)

== Round 5 ==
=== Summary ===
Team 1	Score	Team 2
8 January 1950
FC Wil	2–5 *	Basel
Bellinzona	3–0	Biel-Bienne
Bern	2–4	Lausanne-Sport
St. Gallen	2–3 (a.e.t.)	Young Fellows
Baden	3–0	Luzern
Zürich	2–3 (a.e.t.)	Servette
Fribourg	4–2	Étoile-Sporting
Cantonal Neuchâtel	2–1	ES Malley

- Note: the match Wil–Basel was played in Basel

=== Matches ===
8 January 1950
14:30

Wil	2–5	Basel
Conte (I) 62' (pen. 1:3); Hagen (II) 90' (2:5)	FCB summary	3' (0:1) Wenk; 47' (0:2) Hügi (I); 50' (0:3) Bannwart; 76' (1:4) Stäuble; 78' (1:5) Krieg

Stadion Rankhof, Basel
Attendance: 6,500
Referee: (Switzerland) Eugen Scherz (Bern)

8 January 1950

Zürich	2–3 (a.e.t.)	Servette
Schneiter 56' (1:1); Bosshard 57' (2:1)	FCZ summary Servette summary	2' (0:1) Züfle; 63' (2:2) Tamini; 107' (2:3) Peyla

Letzigrund, Zürich
Attendance: 9,000
Referee: (Switzerland) Joseph Schürch (Winterthur)

== Quarter-finals ==
=== Summary ===
Team 1	Score	Team 2
5 February 1950
Basel	2–0	Bellinzona
Lausanne-Sport	2–1	Young Fellows
Baden	3–4 (a.e.t.)	Servette
Fribourg	3–5 (a.e.t.)	Cantonal Neuchâtel

=== Matches ===
5 February 1950
15:00

Basel	2–0	Bellinzona
Bader 30' (1:0); Stöcklin 67' (pen. 2:0); Hügi (II) (red card)	FCB summary

Stadion Schützenmatte, Basel
Attendance: 8,700
Referee: (Switzerland) Maurice Tasca (Geneva)

5 February 1950

Baden	3–4 (a.e.t.)	Servette
Goal	Servette summary	2x Fatton; 2x Tamini

Esp Stadium, Baden

== Semi-finals ==
=== Summary ===
Team 1	Score	Team 2
5 March 1950
Basel	0–1	Lausanne-Sport
Servette	1–3	Cantonal Neuchâtel

=== Match telegrams ===
5 March 1950
15:30

Basel	0–1	Lausanne-Sport
	FCB summary	85' (0:1) Maillard

Stadion Schützenmatte, Basel
Attendance: 12,500
Referee: (Switzerland) E. Ruefer Bern

5 March 1950

Servette	1–3	Cantonal Neuchâtel
Fatton 48' (1:0)	Servette summary	65' (1:1) Unternährer; 72' (1:2) Facchinetti; 85' (1:3) Facchinetti

Stade des Charmilles, Geneva

== Final ==
The final was held at the former Wankdorf Stadium in Bern on Easter Monday 1950.

=== Summary ===
Team 1	Score	Team 2
10 April 1950
Lausanne-Sport	1–1 (a.e.t.)	Cantonal Neuchâtel

Replay

Team 1	Score	Team 2
18 May 1950
Lausanne-Sport	4–0	Cantonal Neuchâtel

=== Matches ===
10 April 1950
15:00

Lausanne-Sport	1–1 (a.e.t.)	Cantonal Neuchâtel
Hüssy 82' (1:1)	Fussball-Schweiz summary	81' (0:1) Mella

Wankdorf Stadium, Bern
Attendance: 40,000
Referee: (Switzerland) Louis Tschopp (Delémont)

18 May 1950
15:00
Replay

Lausanne-Sport	4–0	Cantonal Neuchâtel
Friedländer 10'; Lanz 21'; Friedländer 59'; Bocquet 84'	Fussball-Schweiz summary

Wankdorf Stadium, Bern
Attendance: 22,000
Referee: (Switzerland) Louis Tschopp (Delémont)

Lausanne-Sport won the cup and this was the club's fourth cup title to this date.

== Further in Swiss football ==
- 1949–50 Nationalliga A
- 1949–50 Nationalliga B
- 1949–50 Swiss 1. Liga

== Sources ==
- Fussball-Schweiz
- FCB Cup games 1949–50 at fcb-achiv.ch
- Switzerland 1949–50 at RSSSF

Preceded by 1948–49	Swiss Cup seasons	Succeeded by 1950–51
