= 1948–49 Swiss Cup =

Tournament details
- Country: Switzerland

Final positions
- Champions: Servette
- Runners-up: Grasshopper Club

The 1948–49 Swiss Cup was the 24th season of Switzerland's football cup competition, organised annually since the 1925–26 season by the Swiss Football Association.

== Overview ==
This season's cup competition began with the first round, which was played on the week-end of the 26 September 1948. The competition was to be completed on Easter Monday, 18 April 1949, with the final, which, since 1937, was traditionally held at the former Wankdorf Stadium in Bern. The clubs from the 1948–49 Swiss 1. Liga were given a bye for the first round, they joined the competition in the second round on the week-end of 10 October. The clubs from this season's Nationalliga A (NLA) and from this season's Nationalliga B (NLB) were given byes for the first two rounds. These teams joined the competition in the third round, which was played on the week-end of 14 November.

The matches were played in a knockout format. In the event of a draw after 90 minutes, the match went into extra time. In the event of a draw at the end of extra time, a replay was foreseen and this was played on the visiting team's pitch. If the replay ended in a draw after extra time, a toss of a coin would establish the team that qualified for the next round.

== Round 1 ==
In the first round, the lower league teams that had qualified themselves for the competition through their regional football association's regional cup competitions or their association's requirements, competed here. Whenever possible, the draw respected local regionalities. The games of the first round were played on Saturday 26 September 1948.

=== Summary ===
Team 1	Score	Team 2
26 September 1948
CA Genève	2–2 (a.e.t.)	Stade Carouge
FC Aigle	4–2	FC Lutry
Bulle	5–1	FC Chailly/Lausanne
FC Renens	1–0	CS La Tour-de-Peilz
Grandson-Sports	3–2	FC Cossonay
Monthey	3–0	FC Visp
Le Locle-Sports	2–1	FC Auvernier
FC Tavannes/Tramelan	1–0	FC Madretsch (Biel)
US Bienne-Boujean	3–0	FC Bözingen 34
FC Selzach	0–1	FC Nidau
Bümpliz	0–1 (a.e.t.)	FC Viktoria Bern
WEF Bern	1–3	FC Längasse (Bern)
Burgdorf	3–0	FC Schönbühl
FC Langenthal	4–2	FC Biberist
Delémont	2–5	Old Boys
FC Röschenz	1–5	FC Münchenstein
Muttenz	0–4	Binningen
SV Sissach	5–0	BCO Basel
FC Suhr	1–0	FC Trimbach
FC Turgi	1–3 (a.e.t.)	Baden
Wettingen	5–0	FC Dietikon
FC Horgen	4–2	Kickers Luzern
SV Höngg	2–1	Ballspielclub Zürich
FC Langnau am Albis	0–1	FC Adliswil
Polizei Zürich	1–0	FC Wädenswil
FC Rüti (ZH)	0–4	FC Wetzikon
FC Albisrieden	2–5	FC Phönix Seen (Winterthur)
FC Wil	2–1	FC Töss
FC St.Margarethen	4–3	Gossau
SV Ceresio Schaffhausen	7–2	SC Veltheim
FC Thayngen	1–5	SV Schaffhausen
FC Bischofszell	4–2	FC Weinfelden
FC Ems	6–2	Chur
FC Wattwil	3–2	FC Winkeln (SG)
US Pro Daro	2–2 (a.e.t.)	US Giubiasco
FC Contone	3–2	SC Balerna

Replays

Team 1	Score	Team 2
3 October 1948
Stade Carouge	1–5	CA Genève
US Giubiasco	1–3	US Pro Daro

== Round 2 ==
=== Summary ===
Team 1	Score	Team 2
10 October 1948
FC Gardy-Jonction (GE)	3–0	Stade Carouge
FC Aigle	1–2	Montreux-Sports
FC Ambrosiana Lausanne	3–2	Bulle
Stade Nyonnais	3–0	FC Renens
Yverdon-Sport	5–0	FC Grandson
Monthey	3–0	FC Sierre
Racing Club Lausanne	3–0	Le Locle-Sports
FC Tavannes/Tramelan	1–5	Étoile-Sporting
Central Fribourg	2–3	US Bienne-Boujean
FC Nidau	0–2	FC Helvetia Bern
FC Viktoria Bern	1–1 (a.e.t.)	Stade Lausanne
ES Malley	5–0	FC Längasse (Bern)
Burgdorf	1–2	SC Derendingen
Lengnau	5–1 (a.e.t.)	FC Langenthal
Old Boys	3–2	FC Porrentruy
FC Birsfelden	1–1 (a.e.t.)	FC Münchenstein
Binningen	0–2	SC Kleinhüningen
Concordia	0–0 (a.e.t.)	SV Sissach
Moutier	6–2	FC Suhr
Baden	2–3	Solothurn
FC Olten	0–1	Wettingen
FC Horgen	0–2	Schöftland
FC Pratteln	1–4	SV Höngg
Zofingen	2–1	FC Adliswil
Polizei Zürich	2–4	Blue Stars
FC Wetzikon	0–2	Uster
FC Schaffhausen	4–3	FC Phönix Seen (Winterthur)
FC Wil	5–1	Arbon
Kreuzlingen	1–0	FC St.Margarethen
SV Ceresio Schaffhausen	2–0	Black Stars
FC Allschwil	2–2 (a.e.t.)	SV Schaffhausen
FC Bischofszell	2–3 (a.e.t.)	Winterthur
FC Ems	1–6	Red Star
FC Wattwil	1–2	FC Altstetten (Zürich)
Emmenbrücke	6–1	US Pro Daro
FC Contone	1–0	Biasca

Replays

Team 1	Score	Team 2
17 October 1948
Stade Lausanne	4–1	FC Viktoria Bern
FC Münchenstein	2–3	FC Birsfelden
SV Sissach	1–5	Concordia
SV Schaffhausen	1–2	FC Allschwil

== Round 3 ==
The teams from this season's NLA and this season's NLB entered the cup competition in this round. However, the teams from the NLA were seeded and could not be drawn against each other. Whenever possible, the draw respected local regionalities. The third round was played on the week-end of 14 November.

=== Summary ===
Team 1	Score	Team 2
14 November 1948
Urania Genève Sport	3–1	FC Helvetia Bern
FC Gardy-Jonction (GE)	1–1 (a.e.t.)	Bern
Moutier	1–0	Stade Lausanne
Thun	1–1 (a.e.t.)	Old Boys
FC Allschwil	0–5	Chiasso
Bellinzona	2–0 (a.e.t.)	Red Star
Biel-Bienne	2–0	Stade Nyonnais
Monthey	1–3	Servette
FC Birsfelden	4–0	Brühl
Lengnau	2–1	Young Fellows
Lausanne-Sport	8–0	FC Ambrosiana Lausanne
Étoile-Sporting	0–1	La Chaux-de-Fonds
Fribourg	3–0	US Bienne-Boujean
Vevey Sports	5–2	Solothurn
St. Gallen	2–0	FC Schaffhausen
Nordstern	3–1 (a.e.t.)	SC Kleinhüningen
Aarau	1–1 (a.e.t.)	FC Altstetten (Zürich)
SC Zug	3–1	SV Ceresio Schaffhausen
Zürich	6–3	FC Wil
Schöftland	4–2	Mendrisio
Grasshopper Club	8–0	Emmenbrücke
Lugano	5–1	Uster
Concordia	5–3	Zofingen
Winterthur	1–2	Basel
SV Höngg	1–3	FC Contone
Yverdon-Sport	2–1	CS International Genève
ES Malley	2–1	Grenchen
Racing Club Lausanne	0–1 *	Cantonal Neuchâtel
Young Boys	3–1	Montreux-Sports
Locarno	2–1	Blue Stars
Kreuzlingen	4–1	Wettingen
5 December 1948
SC Derendingen	1–1 (a.e.t.)	Luzern

- Note: The match Racing Club–Cantonal was played in Neuchâtel.

Replays

Team 1	Score	Team 2
5 December 1948
Bern	0–1	FC Gardy-Jonction (GE)
Old Boys	1–5	Thun
FC Altstetten (Zürich)	0–1	Aarau
26 December 1948
Luzern	1–1 (a.e.t.)	SC Derendingen (t)

- Note: (t): Derendingen qualified on toss of a coin.

=== Matches ===
14 November 1948

Monthey	1–3	Servette
Goal	Servette summary	Fatton; Fatton; Kolly

Stade Philippe Pottier, Monthey

14 November 1948

Zürich	6–3	FC Wil
Zanetti 37' (1:2); Bosshard 40' (2:2); Bosshard 55' (3:3); Schneiter 57' (4:3); Andres 71' (5:3); Andres 84' (6:3)	FCZ summary	10' (0:1) Wiesli; 20' (0:2) Johann Conte; 41' (2:3) Johann Conte

Hardturm, Zürich
Attendance: 2,500
Referee: (Switzerland) Angelo Scanferla (Winterthur)

14 November 1948

Winterthur	1–2	Basel
Diggelmann 35' (1:1)	FCB summary	23' (0:1) Bader; 88' (1:2) Fitze

Schützenwiese, Winterthur
Attendance: 4,500
Referee: (Switzerland) Beck (Zürich)

14 November 1948

Aarau	1–1 (a.e.t.)	FC Altstetten (Zürich)
Goal	FCA summary	Goal

Stadion Brügglifeld, Aarau

5 December 1948

FC Altstetten (Zürich)	0–1	Aarau
	FCA summary	Goal

Buchlern, Altstetten

== Round 4 ==
=== Summary ===
Team 1	Score	Team 2
5 December 1948
Fribourg	3–2	Vevey Sports
St. Gallen	0–2	Nordstern
26 December 1948
Urania Genève Sport	4–0	FC Gardy-Jonction (GE)
Moutier	0–0 (a.e.t.)	Thun
Chiasso	2–1	Bellinzona
Biel-Bienne	1–2	Servette
FC Birsfelden	1–3	Lengnau
Lausanne-Sport	4–0	La Chaux-de-Fonds
Aarau	1–0	SC Zug
Zürich	5–1	Schöftland
Grasshopper Club	2–1	Lugano
Concordia	0–1	Basel
Yverdon-Sport	0–1	ES Malley
Cantonal Neuchâtel	3–1	Young Boys
Locarno	3–0	Kreuzlingen
2 Januar 1949
SC Derendingen	5–1	FC Contone

Replay

Team 1	Score	Team 2
2 January 1949
Thun	3–1 (a.e.t.)	Moutier

=== Matches ===
26 December 1948

Biel-Bienne	1–2	Servette
Goal	Servette summary	Tamini; Peyla

Stadion Gurzelen, Biel/Bienne

26 December 1948

Aarau	1–0	SC Zug
Goal	FCA summary

Stadion Brügglifeld, Aarau

26 December 1948

Zürich	5–1	Schöftland
Zanetti 37' (1:0); Zanetti 50' (2:0); Andres 64' (3:0); Schneiter 87' (pen.) (4:1)); Schneiter 90' (pen.) (5:1))	FCZ summary	(pen.) (3:1)) Willy Uehlinger

Hardturm, Zürich
Attendance: 2,500

26 December 1948

Concordia Basel	0–1	Basel
(penalty missed) 90′	FCB summary	19' (0:1) Baumgratz

Landhof, Basel
Attendance: 2,700
Referee: (Switzerland) E. Ruefer Bern

== Round 5 ==
=== Summary ===
Team 1	Score	Team 2
6 January 1949
Urania Genève Sport	5–0	Thun
Lengnau	0–5	Lausanne-Sport
Fribourg	3–0	Nordstern
Aarau	2–2 (a.e.t.)	Zürich
Grasshopper Club	1–1 (a.e.t.)	Basel
SC Derendingen	0–1	ES Malley
Cantonal Neuchâtel	0–1	Locarno
Chiasso	postponed	Servette

Replays

Team 1	Score	Team 2
23 January 1949
Zürich	4–0	Aarau
Basel	1–2	Grasshopper Club
Chiasso	1–3	Servette

=== Matches ===
6 January 1949

Aarau	2–2 (a.e.t.)	Zürich
Walter Flury 19' (1:1); Libero Taddei 48' (2:1)	FCA summary FCZ summary	9' (0:1) Andres; 85' (2:1) Andres

Stadion Brügglifeld, Aarau
Attendance: 5,500
Referee: (Switzerland) Louis Tschopp (Delémont)

23 January 1949
Replay

Zürich	4–0	Aarau
Schneiter 35' (1:0); Schneiter 65' (2:0); Hotz 69' (3:0); Bosshard 87' (4:0)	FCZ summary FCA summary

Letzigrund, Zürich
Attendance: 6,000
Referee: (Switzerland) Ernst Ruefer (Bern)

9 January 1949
14:15

Grasshopper Club	1–1 (a.e.t.)	Basel
Berbig 59' (1:0)	FCB summary	75' (1:1) Stäuble

Hardturm, Zürich
Attendance: 3,000
Referee: (Switzerland) A. Sandoz Lausanne

22 January 1949
Replay

Basel	1–2	Grasshopper Club
Bopp 33' (pen. 1:0)	FCB summary	64' (1:1) Udo Wang; 75' (1:2) Scholl

Landhof, Basel
Attendance: 6,500
Referee: (Switzerland) von Wartburg Bern

23 January 1949

Chiasso	1–3	Servette
Goal	Servette summary	Züfle; Fatton; Fatton

Stadio Comunale Riva IV, Chiasso

== Quarter-finals ==
=== Summary ===
Team 1	Score	Team 2
16 January 1949
Lausanne-Sport	1–0	Fribourg
13 February 1949
Urania Genève Sport	2–3	Servette
Zürich	0–6	Grasshopper Club
ES Malley	2–0	Locarno

=== Matches ===
13 February 1949

Urania Genève Sport	0–1	Servette
	Servette summary	(0:1) Fatton

Stade de Frontenex, Genève

13 February 1949

Zürich	0–6	Grasshopper Club
	FCZ summary	4' (0:1) Mosimann; 22' (0:2) Mosimann; 73' (0:3) Berbig; 82' (0:4) Berbig; 84' (0:5) Bickel; 86' (0:6) Bickel

Letzigrund, Zürich
Attendance: 10,000
Referee: (Switzerland) Hans Vogt (Schweizerhalle)

== Semi-finals ==
=== Summary ===
Team 1	Score	Team 2
13 March 1949
Grasshopper Club	3–0	ES Malley
27 March 1949
Servette	5–1	Lausanne-Sport

=== Matches ===
13 March 1949

Grasshopper Club	3–0	ES Malley
Berbig 3' (1:0); Udo Wang 15' (2:0); Udo Wang 62' (3:0)	Summary

Referee: (Switzerland)

27 March 1949

Servette	5–1	Lausanne-Sport
Facchinetti 45' (1:1); Facchinetti 75' (2:1); Tamini 77' (3:1); Tamini 87' (4:1); Fatton 88' (5:1)	Summary	13' (0:1) Maillard

Stade des Charmilles, Geneva

== Final ==
The final was held at the former Wankdorf Stadium in Bern on Easter Monday 1949.

=== Summary ===
Team 1	Score	Team 2
18 April 1949
Servette	3–0	Grasshopper Club

=== Telegram ===
18 April 1949

Servette	3–0	Grasshopper Club
Fatton 42' (1:0); Fatton 45' (pen.) (2:0); Tamini 70' (3:0)	Fussball-Schweiz summary

Wankdorf Stadium, Bern
Attendance: 35,000
Referee: (Switzerland) Ernst Dörflinger (Grenchen)

Servette won the cup and this was the club's second cup title to this date.

== Further in Swiss football ==
- 1948–49 Nationalliga A
- 1948–49 Nationalliga B
- 1948–49 Swiss 1. Liga

== Sources ==
- Fussball-Schweiz
- FCB Cup games 1948–49 at fcb-achiv.ch
- Switzerland 1948–49 at RSSSF

Preceded by 1947–48	Swiss Cup seasons	Succeeded by 1949–50
