= 1948–49 Swiss 1. Liga =

1. Liga
- Season: 1948–49
- Champions: 1. Liga champions: Étoile-Sporting; Group West: Étoile-Sporting; Group Cenral: Moutier; Group South and East: Winterthur
- Promoted: Étoile-Sporting; Moutier
- Relegated: Group West: Racing Club Lausanne; Group Central: FC Black Stars Basel; Allschwil; Group South and East: GC Biaschesi
- Matches: 3 times 132 and 1 decider plus 3 play-offs and 3 play-outs

The 1948–49 1. Liga season was the 17th season of the 1. Liga since its creation in 1931. At this time, the 1. Liga was the third-tier of the Swiss football league system.

== Format ==
There were 36 teams competing in the 1. Liga this season. They were divided into three regional groups, each group with 12 teams. Within each group, the teams would play a double round-robin to decide their league position. Two points were awarded for a win and one point was awarded for a draw. The three group winners then contested a play-off round to decide the overall championship and the two promotion slots to the second-tier (NLB). The last placed team in each group were directly relegated to the 2. Liga (fourth tier). The second last placed team from each group then contested a play-out to decide the fourth and final relegation slot.

== Group West ==
=== Teams, locations ===
Club	Based in	Canton	Stadium	Capacity
Ambrosiana Lausanne	Lausanne	Vaud		
FC Central Fribourg	Fribourg	Fribourg	Guintzet	2,000
FC Helvetia Bern	Bern	Bern	Spitalacker, Bern	1,000
FC Étoile-Sporting	La Chaux-de-Fonds	Neuchâtel	Les Foulets / Terrain des Eplatures	1,000 / 500
FC Gardy-Jonction	Geneva	Geneva		
ES FC Malley	Malley	Vaud	Centre sportif de la Tuilière	1,500
FC Montreux-Sports	Montreux	Vaud	Stade de Chailly	1,000
Racing Club Lausanne	Lausanne	Vaud	Centre sportif de la Tuilière	1,000
FC Sierre	Sierre	Valais	Complexe Ecossia	2,000
FC Stade Nyonnais	Nyon	Vaud	Stade de Colovray	7,200
FC Stade Lausanne	Ouchy, Lausanne	Vaud	Centre sportif de Vidy	1,000
Yverdon-Sport FC	Yverdon-les-Bains	Vaud	Stade Municipal	6,600

=== Final league table ===
Pos	Team	Pld	W	D	L	GF	GA	GD	Pts	Qualification or relegation
1	FC Étoile-Sporting	22	16	2	4	66	31	+35	34	To promotion play-off
2	FC Montreux-Sports	22	14	3	5	64	31	+33	31	
3	ES FC Malley	22	12	4	6	56	33	+23	28	
4	FC Helvetia Bern	22	9	7	6	41	32	+9	25	
5	FC Sierre	22	9	5	8	43	43	0	23	
6	Central Fribourg	22	7	6	9	37	48	−11	20	
7	FC Ambrosiana Lausanne	22	7	6	9	31	48	−17	20	
8	FC Stade Nyonnais	22	8	3	11	26	32	−6	19	
9	Yverdon-Sport FC	22	7	5	10	26	40	−14	19	
10	FC Gardy-Jonction	22	6	4	12	30	59	−29	16	
11	FC Stade Lausanne	22	5	5	12	30	38	−8	15	Play-out against relegation
12	Racing Club Lausanne	22	5	4	13	32	47	−15	14	Relegation to 2. Liga

Source: RSSSF
Rules for classification: 1) Points; 2) Goal difference within the league, but decider play-off for qualifiers.

== Group Central ==
=== Teams, locations ===
Club	Based in	Canton	Stadium	Capacity
FC Allschwil	Allschwil	Basel-Landschaft	Im Brüel	1,700
FC Birsfelden	Birsfelden	Basel-Landschaft	Sternenfeld	9,400
FC Black Stars Basel	Basel	Basel-Stadt	Buschwilerhof	1,200
FC Concordia Basel	Basel	Basel-Stadt	Stadion Rankhof	7,000
SC Derendingen	Derendingen	Solothurn	Heidenegg	1,500
SC Kleinhüningen	Basel	Basel-Stadt	Sportplatz Schorenmatte	300
FC Lengnau	Lengnau	Bern	Moos Lengnau BE	3,900
FC Moutier	Moutier	Bern	Stade de Chalière	5,000
FC Porrentruy	Porrentruy	Jura	Stade du Tirage	4,226
FC Pratteln	Pratteln	Basel-Landschaft	In den Sandgruben	5,000
SC Schöftland	Schöftland	Aargau	Sportanlage Rütimatten	2,000
FC Solothurn	Solothurn	Solothurn	Stadion FC Solothurn	6,750

=== Final league table ===
Pos	Team	Pld	W	D	L	GF	GA	GD	Pts	Qualification or relegation
1	FC Moutier	22	16	3	3	62	31	+31	35	To promotion play-off
2	FC Concordia Basel	22	12	6	4	57	38	+19	30	
3	FC Birsfelden	22	12	5	5	47	37	+10	29	
4	SC Derendingen	22	8	8	6	52	41	+11	24	
5	FC Solothurn	22	10	4	8	58	48	+10	24	
6	FC Lengnau	22	8	6	8	34	35	−1	22	
7	FC Porrentruy	22	9	3	10	46	47	−1	21	
8	SC Schöftland	22	10	0	12	51	67	−16	20	
9	FC Pratteln	22	7	4	11	41	50	−9	18	
10	SC Kleinhüningen	22	7	3	12	37	45	−8	17	
11	FC Allschwil	22	6	2	14	31	48	−17	14	Play-out against relegation
12	FC Black Stars Basel	22	3	4	15	34	63	−29	10	Relegation to 2. Liga

Source: RSSSF
Rules for classification: 1) Points; 2) Goal difference within the league, but decider play-off for qualifiers.

== Group South and East ==
=== Teams, locations ===
Club	Based in	Canton	Stadium	Capacity
FC Altstetten (Zürich)	Altstetten	Zürich	Buchlern	1,000
FC Arbon	Arbon	Thurgau	Stacherholz	1,000
GC Biaschesi	Biasca	Ticino	Campo Sportivo "Al Vallone"	2,850
FC Blue Stars Zürich	Zürich	Zürich	Hardhof	1,000
FC Emmenbrücke	Emmen	Lucerne	Stadion Gersag	8,700
FC Kreuzlingen	Kreuzlingen	Thurgau	Sportplatz Hafenareal	1,200
FC Olten	Olten	Solothurn	Sportanlagen Kleinholz	8,000
FC Red Star Zürich	Zürich	Zürich	Allmend Brunau	2,000
FC Schaffhausen	Schaffhausen	Schaffhausen	Stadion Breite	7,300
FC Uster	Uster	Zürich	Sportanlage Buchholz	7,000
FC Winterthur	Winterthur	Zürich	Schützenwiese	8,550
SC Zofingen	Zofingen	Aargau	Sportanlagen Trinermatten	2,000

=== Final league table ===
Pos	Team	Pld	W	D	L	GF	GA	GD	Pts	Qualification or relegation
1	FC Winterthur	22	15	4	3	42	19	+23	34	To promotion play-off
2	FC Schaffhausen	22	12	7	3	66	32	+34	31	
3	FC Red Star Zürich	22	8	9	5	44	35	+9	25	
4	FC Blue Stars Zürich	22	9	5	8	43	31	+12	23	
5	FC Olten	22	9	4	9	42	36	+6	22	
6	FC Uster	22	9	4	9	44	42	+2	22	
7	FC Arbon	22	8	6	8	35	36	−1	22	
8	FC Emmenbrücke	22	6	10	6	33	35	−2	22	
9	FC Kreuzlingen	22	8	3	11	40	60	−20	19	
10	SC Zofingen	22	6	3	13	39	70	−31	15	To decider for tenth place
11	FC Altstetten (Zürich)	22	4	7	11	25	38	−13	15	To decider for tenth place
12	GC Biaschesi	22	5	4	13	35	54	−19	14	Relegation to 2. Liga

Source: RSSSF
Rules for classification: 1) Points; 2) Goal difference within the league, but decider play-off for qualifiers.

=== Decider for tenth place ===
The decider was played on 19 June in Zürich.

Team 1	Score	Team 2
FC Altstetten	0–1	Zofingen

Zofingen won and were placed tenth, thus they remained in the division for the following season. FC Altstetten were placed as eleventh and thus continued to the relegation play-outs.

== Promotion, relegation ==
=== Promotion play-off ===
The three group winners played a single round-robin to decide the overall championship and the two promotion slots. The promotion play-offs were held on 12, 19 and 26 June 1949.

Pos	Team	Pld	W	D	L	GF	GA	GD	Pts	Qualification	ES	MOU	WIN
1	Étoile-Sporting	2	1	1	0	5	0	+5	3	Champions and promoted	—	5–0	—
2	Moutier	2	1	0	1	1	5	−4	2	Promoted	—	—	1–0
3	Winterthur	2	0	1	1	0	1	−1	1		0–0	—	—

Source: RSSSF
Rules for classification: 1) Points; 2) Head-to-head 3) Decider.

Étoile-Sporting became 1. Liga Champions and together with runners-up Moutier were promoted to 1949–50 Nationalliga B. Winterthur remained in the division for the next season.

=== Relegation play-out ===
The three second last placed teams from each group contested a play-out to decide the fourth and final relegation slot. The matches in the play-outs were held on 19 and 26 June 1949. The third match was not played.

Pos	Team	Pld	W	D	L	GF	GA	GD	Pts	Qualification or relegation	SLO	ALTZ	ALW
1	Stade Lausanne	1	1	0	0	3	0	+3	2		—	—	3–0
2	Altstetten	1	1	0	0	4	3	+1	2		n/p	—	—
3	Allschwil	2	0	0	2	3	7	−4	0	Relegated to 2. Liga	—	3–4	—

Source: RSSSF
Rules for classification: 1) Points; 2) Head-to-head 3) Decider.

The match Altstetten against Stade Lausanne was not played. Both teams remained in the division for the next season, Allschwil were relegated to 2. Liga.

== Further in Swiss football ==
- 1948–49 Nationalliga A
- 1948–49 Nationalliga B
- 1948–49 Swiss Cup

== Sources ==
- Switzerland 1948–49 at RSSSF

Preceded by 1947–48	Seasons in Swiss 1. Liga	Succeeded by 1949–50
