= 1948–49 Nationalliga A =

Swiss football season

Nationalliga A
- Season: 1948–49
- Champions: Lugano
- Relegated: Grasshopper Club; Urania Genève Sport
- Top goalscorer: Jacques Fatton (Servette); 21 goals

Nationalliga B
- Season: 1948–49
- Champions: St. Gallen
- Promoted: St. Gallen; Bern
- Relegated: Vevey-Sports; International Genève
- Top goalscorer: Guido Hartmann (Fribourg); 23 goals

The following is the summary of the Swiss National League in the 1948–49 football season, both Nationalliga A and Nationalliga B. This was the 52nd season of top-tier and the 51st season of second-tier football in Switzerland.

== Overview ==
The Swiss Football Association (ASF/SFV) had 28 member clubs at this time which were divided into two divisions of 14 teams each. The teams played a double round-robin to decide their table positions. Two points were awarded for a win and one point was awarded for a draw. The top tier (NLA) was contested by the top 12 teams from the previous season and the two newly promoted teams Urania Genève Sport and Chiasso. The last two teams in the league table at the end of the season were to be relegated.

The second-tier (NLB) was contested by the two teams that had been relegated from the NLA at the end of the last season, these were Bern and Cantonal Neuchâtel, the ten teams that had been in third to twelfth position last season and the two newly promoted teams from the 1. Liga Mendrisio and Vevey-Sports. The top two teams at the end of the season would be promoted to the 1949–50 NLA and the two last placed teams would be relegated to the 1949–50 Swiss 1. Liga.

== Nationalliga A ==
=== Teams, locations ===
Team	Based in	Canton	Stadium	Capacity
FC Basel	Basel	Basel-Stadt	Landhof	4,000
AC Bellinzona	Bellinzona	Ticino	Stadio Comunale Bellinzona	5,000
FC Biel-Bienne	Biel/Bienne	Bern	Stadion Gurzelen	5,500
FC Chiasso	Chiasso	Ticino	Stadio Comunale Riva IV	4,000
Grasshopper Club Zürich	Zürich	Zürich	Hardturm	20,000
FC Grenchen	Grenchen	Solothurn	Stadium Brühl	15,100
FC La Chaux-de-Fonds	La Chaux-de-Fonds	Neuchâtel	Centre Sportif de la Charrière	10,000
FC Lausanne-Sport	Lausanne	Vaud	Pontaise	30,000
FC Locarno	Locarno	Ticino	Stadio comunale Lido	5,000
FC Lugano	Lugano	Ticino	Cornaredo Stadium	6,330
Servette FC	Geneva	Geneva	Stade des Charmilles	27,000
Urania Genève Sport	Genève	Geneva	Stade de Frontenex	4,000
FC Young Fellows	Zürich	Zürich	Utogrund	2,850
FC Zürich	Zürich	Zürich	Letzigrund	25,000

=== Final league table ===
Pos	Team	Pld	W	D	L	GF	GA	GD	Pts	Qualification
1	Lugano	26	18	4	4	41	18	+23	40	Swiss Champions
2	Basel	26	13	7	6	58	37	+21	33	
3	La Chaux-de-Fonds	26	11	7	8	54	50	+4	29	
4	Servette	26	10	7	9	59	43	+16	27	Swiss Cup winners
5	Zürich	26	10	7	9	65	59	+6	27	
6	Bellinzona	26	9	9	8	31	33	−2	27	
7	Locarno	26	10	7	9	32	40	−8	27	
8	Lausanne-Sport	26	11	4	11	52	41	+11	26	
9	Biel-Bienne	26	10	5	11	39	38	+1	25	
10	Grenchen	26	6	11	9	39	42	−3	23	
11	Chiasso	26	8	6	12	35	55	−20	22	
12	Young Fellows Zürich	26	8	5	13	45	66	−21	21	
13	Grasshopper Club	26	7	6	13	42	51	−9	20	Relegated to 1949–50 NLB
14	Urania Genève Sport	26	4	9	13	32	51	−19	17	Relegated to 1949–50 NLB

Source: rsssf.com
Rules for classification: 1) Points; 2) Goal difference within the league, however with play-off for qualifiers;

=== Results ===
Home \ Away	BAS	BEL	BB	CDF	CHI	GCZ	GRE	LS	LOC	LUG	SER	UGS	YFZ	ZÜR
Basel		1–0	1–1	3–2	4–0	2–0	2–2	3–1	4–1	0–1	3–0	1–1	6–1	3–1
Bellinzona	3–3		1–0	2–1	2–0	0–0	1–1	1–2	2–1	1–0	2–0	3–1	2–1	3–3
Biel-Bienne	2–0	4–0		3–2	1–2	5–2	2–0	0–4	1–1	4–2	0–0	2–1	1–4	2–3
La Chaux-de-Fonds	2–4	0–0	0–0		3–1	4–1	3–2	4–3	1–1	2–0	2–2	3–0	3–4	5–2
Chiasso	2–1	2–2	2–2	1–2		3–1	4–0	0–0	2–1	0–2	2–1	1–1	2–1	1–2
Grasshopper Club	2–2	1–1	4–3	1–2	7–0		1–1	0–3	1–1	2–4	2–2	3–0	1–2	2–1
Grenchen	2–3	1–0	0–2	1–1	5–0	2–1		4–5	0–0	0–1	2–4	1–0	5–1	2–2
Lausanne-Sports	2–0	0–1	1–0	2–3	1–3	4–1	1–1		0–1	0–1	4–3	1–1	2–1	1–3
Locarno	2–0	2–1	1–2	3–0	2–2	3–1	0–0	2–1		0–1	1–0	2–1	2–1	2–1
Lugano	1–0	2–0	1–0	3–0	2–0	0–2	0–0	2–1	3–0		2–1	1–1	2–0	1–1
Servette	1–1	1–1	2–0	0–3	1–1	5–0	1–3	2–1	6–0	0–3		6–1	8–2	4–3
Urania	2–3	1–0	0–1	6–1	2–2	1–0	1–1	2–2	0–0	0–2	1–1		4–0	1–6
Young Fellows	3–3	4–0	1–0	2–2	4–2	0–3	2–2	0–4	4–0	1–1	0–5	6–1		0–0
Zürich	2–4	1–1	2–1	3–3	5–1	0–4	4–1	2–6	5–3	2–3	3–3	3–2	5–0	

Source: rsssf.com
Legend: Blue = home team win; Yellow = draw; Red = away team win.

=== Topscorers ===
Rank	Player	Nat.	Goals	Club
1.	Jacques Fatton	(Switzerland)	21	Servette
2.	Charles Antenen	(Switzerland)	19	La Chaux-de-Fonds
3.	Hans Siegenthaler	(Switzerland)	18	Young Fellows Zürich
4.	Erich Andres	(Switzerland)	17	Zürich
5.	Sergio Bernasconi	(Switzerland)	15	Lugano
6.	Hans Hügi	(Switzerland)	14	Basel
6.	Ledio Zanetti	(Switzerland)	14	Zürich
8.	Milorad Nikolić	(Socialist Federal Republic of Yugoslavia)	13	Lausanne-Sport
9.	Ezio Sormani	(Switzerland)	12	Bellinzona
9.	Alessandro Righetti	(Switzerland)	12	Grenchen
9.	Hans-Peter Friedländer	(Switzerland)	12	Lausanne-Sport
9.	Walter Bosshard	(Switzerland)	12	Zürich

== Nationalliga B ==
=== Teams, locations ===
Team	Based in	Canton	Stadium	Capacity
FC Aarau	Aarau	Aargau	Stadion Brügglifeld	9,240
FC Bern	Bern	Bern	Stadion Neufeld	14,000
SC Brühl	St. Gallen	St. Gallen	Paul-Grüninger-Stadion	4,200
FC Cantonal Neuchâtel	Neuchâtel	Neuchâtel	Stade de la Maladière	25,500
FC Fribourg	Fribourg	Fribourg	Stade Universitaire	9,000
CS International Genève	Geneva	Geneva		
FC Luzern	Lucerne	Lucerne	Stadion Allmend	25,000
FC Mendrisio	Mendrisio	Ticino	Centro Sportivo Comunale	4,000
FC Nordstern Basel	Basel	Basel-Stadt	Rankhof	7,600
FC St. Gallen	St. Gallen	St. Gallen	Espenmoos	11,000
FC Thun	Thun	Bern	Stadion Lachen	10,350
Vevey-Sports	Vevey	Vaud	Stade de Copet	4,000
BSC Young Boys	Bern	Bern	Wankdorf Stadium	56,000
SC Zug	Zug	Zug	Herti Allmend Stadion	6,000

=== Final league table ===
Pos	Team	Pld	W	D	L	GF	GA	GD	Pts	Qualification or relegation
1	FC St. Gallen	26	13	8	5	51	34	+17	34	To play-off for NLB championship
2	FC Bern	26	14	6	6	46	31	+15	34	To play-off for NLB championship
3	BSC Young Boys	26	15	3	8	53	26	+27	33	
4	FC Aarau	26	14	4	8	45	31	+14	32	
5	FC Cantonal Neuchâtel	26	11	9	6	57	35	+22	31	
6	FC Fribourg	26	13	5	8	47	43	+4	31	
7	FC Luzern	26	12	6	8	32	28	+4	30	
8	FC Mendrisio	26	10	8	8	46	37	+9	28	
9	SC Brühl	26	8	8	10	34	37	−3	24	
10	FC Thun	26	6	9	11	29	40	−11	21	
11	SC Zug	26	9	3	14	36	59	−23	21	
12	FC Nordstern Basel	26	6	6	14	37	55	−18	18	
13	Vevey-Sports	26	7	2	17	32	56	−24	16	Relegated to 1949–50 1. Liga
14	CS International Genève	26	4	3	19	28	61	−33	11	Relegated to 1949–50 1. Liga

Source: RSSSF
Rules for classification: 1) Points; 2) Goal difference within the league, however with play-off for qualifiers;

=== Decider for NLB championship ===
FC St. Gallen and FC Bern finished the season level on points in joint first position and both achieved promotion to 1949–50 Nationalliga A. However, it required a play-off to decide the division championship. The play-off was played on 19 June 1949 at the Hardturm in Zürich.

Team 1	Score	Team 2
St. Gallen	1–1 (a.e.t.)	Bern

The replay was also played at the Hardturm on 26 June.

Team 1	Score	Team 2
St. Gallen	5–2	Bern

St. Gallen won and became NLB champions.

== Further in Swiss football ==
- 1948–49 Swiss Cup
- 1948–49 Swiss 1. Liga

== Sources ==
- Switzerland 1948–49 at RSSSF

Preceded by 1947–48	Nationalliga seasons in Switzerland	Succeeded by 1949–50
