= 1949–50 Swiss 1. Liga =

1. Liga
- Season: 1949–50
- Champions: 1. Liga champions: Winterthur; Group West: ES Malley; Group Cenral: Concordia; Group South and East: Winterthur
- Promoted: Winterthur; Concordia
- Relegated: Group West: FC Gardy-Jonction; Group Central: Zofingen; Group South and East: Emmenbrücke; Kreuzlingen
- Matches: 3 times 132 and 5 deciders plus 3 play-offs and 3 play-outs

The 1949–50 1. Liga season was the 18th season of the 1. Liga since its creation in 1931. At this time, the 1. Liga was the third-tier of the Swiss football league system.

== Format ==
There were 36 teams competing in the 1. Liga this season. They were divided into three regional groups, each group with 12 teams. Within each group, the teams would play a double round-robin to decide their league position. Two points were awarded for a win and one point was awarded for a draw. The three group winners then contested a play-off round to decide the two promotion slots to the second-tier (NLB). The last placed team in each group were directly relegated to the 2. Liga (fourth tier). The second last placed team from each group then contested a play-out to decide the fourth and last relegation slot.

== Group West ==
=== Teams, locations ===
Club	Based in	Canton	Stadium	Capacity
Ambrosiana Lausanne	Lausanne	Vaud		
FC Central Fribourg	Fribourg	Fribourg	Guintzet	2,000
FC Gardy-Jonction	Geneva	Geneva		
CS International Genève	Geneva	Geneva		
FC La Tour/Le Pâquier	La Tour-de-Trême (Bulle)	Fribourg	Stade de Bouleyres	7,000
ES FC Malley	Malley	Vaud	Centre sportif de la Tuilière	1,500
FC Montreux-Sports	Montreux	Vaud	Stade de Chailly	1,000
FC Sierre	Sierre	Valais	Complexe Ecossia	2,000
FC Stade Lausanne	Ouchy, Lausanne	Vaud	Centre sportif de Vidy	1,000
FC Stade Nyonnais	Nyon	Vaud	Stade de Colovray	7,200
Vevey Sports	Vevey	Vaud	Stade de Copet	4,000
Yverdon-Sport FC	Yverdon-les-Bains	Vaud	Stade Municipal	6,600

=== Final league table ===
Pos	Team	Pld	W	D	L	GF	GA	GD	Pts	Qualification or relegation
1	ES FC Malley	22	18	2	2	73	17	+56	38	To promotion play-off
2	Vevey Sports	22	12	2	8	42	30	+12	26	
3	CS International Genève	22	9	7	6	42	27	+15	25	
4	CS La Tour-de-Peilz	22	9	6	7	37	39	−2	24	
5	FC Stade Nyonnais	22	8	6	8	29	35	−6	22	
6	FC Montreux-Sports	22	8	5	9	24	30	−6	21	
7	FC Sierre	22	7	6	9	45	37	+8	20	
8	FC Ambrosiana Lausanne	22	8	4	10	34	41	−7	20	
9	Yverdon-Sport FC	22	6	7	9	33	41	−8	19	
10	Central Fribourg	22	5	8	9	33	44	−11	18	Decider for tenth place
11	FC Stade Lausanne	22	7	4	11	30	41	−11	18	Decider for tenth place
12	FC Gardy-Jonction	22	3	7	12	21	61	−40	13	Relegation to 2. Liga

Source: RSSSF
Rules for classification: 1) Points; 2) Goal difference within the league, but decider play-off for qualifiers.

=== Decider for tenth place ===
The deciders were played on 18 and 25 June 1950.

Team 1	Score	Team 2
Central Fribourg	2–0	Stade Lausanne
Stade Lausanne	4–2	Central Fribourg

The teams were level with one win each and, therefore, a replay was required. This took place on 2 July in Payerne.

Team 1	Score	Team 2
Central Fribourg	2–1	Stade Lausanne

Central Fribourg won and remained in the division for the following season. Stade Lausanne continued in the play-outs.

== Group Central ==
=== Teams, locations ===
Club	Based in	Canton	Stadium	Capacity
FC Birsfelden	Birsfelden	Basel-Landschaft	Sternenfeld	9,400
FC Concordia Basel	Basel	Basel-Stadt	Stadion Rankhof	7,000
SC Derendingen	Derendingen	Solothurn	Heidenegg	1,500
FC Helvetia Bern	Bern	Bern	Spitalacker, Bern	1,000
SC Kleinhüningen	Basel	Basel-Stadt	Sportplatz Schorenmatte	300
FC Lengnau	Lengnau	Bern	Moos Lengnau BE	3,900
FC Olten	Olten	Solothurn	Sportanlagen Kleinholz	8,000
FC Porrentruy	Porrentruy	Jura	Stade du Tirage	4,226
FC Pratteln	Pratteln	Basel-Landschaft	In den Sandgruben	5,000
Saint-Imier-Sports	Saint-Imier	Bern	Terrain de Fin-des-Fourches	1,000
FC Solothurn	Solothurn	Solothurn	Stadion FC Solothurn	6,750
SC Zofingen	Zofingen	Aargau	Sportanlagen Trinermatten	2,000

=== Final league table ===
Pos	Team	Pld	W	D	L	GF	GA	GD	Pts	Qualification or relegation
1	FC Concordia Basel	22	18	2	2	73	18	+55	38	To promotion play-off
2	FC Lengnau	22	10	7	5	46	32	+14	27	
3	FC Helvetia Bern	22	9	8	5	46	34	+12	26	
4	SC Derendingen	22	8	8	6	39	33	+6	24	
5	FC Solothurn	22	9	6	7	32	44	−12	24	
6	FC Olten	22	7	9	6	40	29	+11	23	
7	SC Kleinhüningen	22	6	10	6	40	35	+5	22	
8	FC Porrentruy	22	7	8	7	39	40	−1	22	
9	Saint-Imier-Sports	22	6	5	11	33	56	−23	17	
10	FC Birsfelden	22	4	7	11	30	46	−16	15	Decider for tenth place
11	FC Pratteln	22	3	9	10	24	45	−21	15	Decider for tenth place
12	SC Zofingen	22	4	3	15	32	62	−30	11	Relegation to 2. Liga

Source: RSSSF
Rules for classification: 1) Points; 2) Goal difference within the league, but decider play-off for qualifiers.

=== Decider for tenth place ===
The deciders were played on 18 and 25 June 1950.

Team 1	Score	Team 2
FC Birsfelden	0–1	FC Pratteln
FC Pratteln	5–3	FC Birsfelden

FC Pratteln won and remained in the division for the next season. FC Birsfelden continued in the play-outs.

== Group South and East ==
=== Teams, locations ===
Club	Based in	Canton	Stadium	Capacity
FC Altstetten (Zürich)	Altstetten	Zürich	Buchlern	1,000
FC Arbon	Arbon	Thurgau	Stacherholz	1,000
FC Baden	Baden	Aargau	Esp Stadium	7,000
FC Blue Stars Zürich	Zürich	Zürich	Hardhof	1,000
FC Emmenbrücke	Emmen	Lucerne	Stadion Gersag	8,700
FC Kreuzlingen	Kreuzlingen	Thurgau	Sportplatz Hafenareal	1,200
FC Red Star Zürich	Zürich	Zürich	Allmend Brunau	2,000
FC Schaffhausen	Schaffhausen	Schaffhausen	Stadion Breite	7,300
SC Schöftland	Schöftland	Aargau	Sportanlage Rütimatten	2,000
FC Uster|	Uster	Zürich	Sportanlage Buchholz	7,000
FC Wil	Wil	St. Gallen	Sportpark Bergholz	6,048
FC Winterthur	Winterthur	Zürich	Schützenwiese	8,550

=== Final league table ===
Pos	Team	Pld	W	D	L	GF	GA	GD	Pts	Qualification or relegation
1	FC Winterthur	22	19	3	0	55	26	+29	41	To promotion play-off
2	FC Wil	22	15	2	5	53	29	+24	32	
3	FC Schaffhausen	22	14	3	5	68	33	+35	31	
4	FC Uster	22	12	1	9	43	43	0	25	
5	FC Baden	22	9	6	7	49	36	+13	24	
6	FC Red Star Zürich	22	9	3	10	30	27	+3	21	
7	FC Arbon	22	6	9	7	39	39	0	21	
8	SC Schöftland	22	7	4	11	43	53	−10	18	
9	FC Altstetten (Zürich)	22	5	5	12	32	51	−19	15	
10	FC Blue Stars Zürich	22	6	2	14	44	65	−21	14	
11	FC Kreuzlingen	22	3	6	13	27	47	−20	12	Play-out against relegation
12	FC Emmenbrücke	22	3	4	15	18	52	−34	10	Relegation to 2. Liga

Source: RSSSF
Rules for classification: 1) Points; 2) Goal difference within the league, but decider play-off for qualifiers.

== Promotion, relegation ==
=== Promotion play-off ===
The three group winners played a single round-robin to decide the two promotion slots. The promotion play-offs were held on 18, 25 June and 2 July 1950.

Pos	Team	Pld	W	D	L	GF	GA	GD	Pts	Qualification	WIN	CON	ESM
1	Winterthur	2	2	0	0	3	1	+2	4	Champions and promoted	—	2–1	—
2	Concordia	2	1	0	1	4	4	0	2	Promoted	—	—	3–2
3	ES Malley	2	0	0	2	2	4	−2	0		0–1	—	—

Source: RSSSF
Rules for classification: 1) Points; 2) Head-to-head 3) Decider.

Winterthur became 1. Liga Champions and together with runners-up Concordia were promoted to 1950–51 Nationalliga B. ES Malley remained in the division for the next season.

=== Relegation play-out ===
The three second last placed teams from each group contested a play-out to decide the fourth and final relegation slot. The matches in the play-outs were held on 2 and 9 July.

Pos	Team	Pld	W	D	L	GF	GA	GD	Pts	Qualification or relegation	SLO	BIR	KRE
1	Stade Lausanne	1	1	0	0	1	0	+1	2		—	—	1–0
2	Birsfelden	1	1	0	0	2	1	+1	2		n/p	—	—
3	Kreuzlingen	2	0	0	2	1	3	−2	0	Relegated to 2. Liga	—	1–2	—

Source: RSSSF
Rules for classification: 1) Points; 2) Head-to-head 3) Decider.

The match Birsfelden against Stade Lausanne was not played. Both teams remained in the division for the next season, Kreuzlingen were relegated to 2. Liga.

== Further in Swiss football ==
- 1949–50 Nationalliga A
- 1949–50 Nationalliga B
- 1949–50 Swiss Cup

== Sources ==
- Switzerland 1949–50 at RSSSF

Preceded by 1948–49	Seasons in Swiss 1. Liga	Succeeded by 1950–51
