= 1948–49 BSC Young Boys season =

BSC Young Boys
1948–49 season
- Chairman: Adolf Rösti
- Manager: Fritz Gschweidl
- Stadium: Stadion Wankdorf
- Nationalliga B: 3rd
- Swiss Cup: Round of 32

The 1948–49 season was the 49th season in the history of Berner Sport Club Young Boys. The team played their home games at Stadion Wankdorf in Bern.

== Players ==
- Eich
- Flühmann
- Zehnder
- C. Casali
- Giacometti
- Hochstrasser
- Neuenschwander
- Beerli
- Grütter
- Monti
- Weil

== Competitions ==
Win Draw Loss

=== Overall record ===
Competition	First match	Last match	Starting round	Final position	Record							
Competition	First match	Last match	Starting round	Final position	Pld	W	D	L	GF	GA	GD	Win %
Nationalliga B	29 August 1948	12 June 1949	Matchday 1	3rd	26	15	3	8	53	26	+27	57.69
Swiss Cup	14 November 1948	26 December 1948	3rd principal round	Round of 32	2	1	0	1	4	4	+0	50.00
Total					28	16	3	9	57	30	+27	57.14

Source: Competitions

=== Nationalliga B ===
==== Matches ====
29 August 1948 1	Young Boys	3–0	Luzern	Bern
				Stadium: Stadion Wankdorf; Attendance: 3,500

5 September 1948 2	FC Fribourg	1–4	Young Boys	Fribourg
				Stadium: Stade Universitaire Saint-Léonard; Attendance: 2,500

12 September 1948 3	Young Boys	3–1	Mendrisio	Bern
				Stadium: Stadion Wankdorf; Attendance: 4,000

26 September 1948 4	SC Brühl	3–2	Young Boys	St. Gallen
				Stadium: Sportplatz Krontal; Attendance: 3,500

3 October 1948 5	Young Boys	0–1	FC Bern	Bern
				Stadium: Stadion Wankdorf; Attendance: 8,000

17 October 1948 6	SC Zug	0–1	Young Boys	Lucerne
				Stadium: Stadion Allmend; Attendance: 1,200

24 October 1948 7	Young Boys	2–1	Nordstern Basel	Bern
				Stadium: Stadion Wankdorf; Attendance: 4,000

31 October 1948 8	CS International Genève	1–1	Young Boys	Geneva
				Stadium: Stade de Frontenex; Attendance: 2,500

7 November 1948 9	Young Boys	2–3	Aarau	Bern
				Stadium: Stadion Wankdorf; Attendance: 4,200

21 November 1948 10	St. Gallen	1–0	Young Boys	St. Gallen
				Stadium: Espenmoos; Attendance: 3,000

28 November 1948 11	Young Boys	2–3	Cantonal Neuchâtel	Bern
				Stadium: Stadion Wankdorf; Attendance: 4,200

12 December 1948 12	Young Boys	1–2	Vevey-Sports	Bern
				Stadium: Stadion Wankdorf; Attendance: 3,000

19 December 1948 13	Thun	0–1	Young Boys	Thun
				Stadium: Sportplatz Grabengut; Attendance: 3,200

20 February 1949 14	Luzern	1–0	Young Boys	Lucerne
				Stadium: Stadion Allmend; Attendance: 3,300

27 February 1949 15	Young Boys	1–1	FC Fribourg	Bern
				Stadium: Stadion Wankdorf; Attendance: 5,000

6 March 1949 16	Mendrisio	3–2	Young Boys	Mendrisio
				Stadium: Stadio comunale di Mendrisio; Attendance: 1,500

13 March 1949 25	Vevey-Sports	0–1	Young Boys	Vevey
				Stadium: Stade de Copet; Attendance: 3,000

20 March 1949 17	Young Boys	2–0	SC Brühl	Bern
				Stadium: Stadion Wankdorf; Attendance: 2,800

27 March 1949 18	FC Bern	1–1	Young Boys	Bern
				Stadium: Stadion Neufeld; Attendance: 9,000

10 April 1949 19	Young Boys	5–0	SC Zug	Bern
				Stadium: Stadion Wankdorf; Attendance: 3,500

24 April 1949 20	Nordstern Basel	2–4	Young Boys	Basel
				Stadium: Stadion Rankhof; Attendance: 2,300

1 May 1949 21	Young Boys	5–1	CS International Genève	Bern
				Stadium: Stadion Wankdorf; Attendance: 1,200

8 May 1949 22	Aarau	0–1	Young Boys	Aarau
				Stadium: Stadion Brügglifeld; Attendance: 4,500

15 May 1949 23	Young Boys	3–0	St. Gallen	Bern
				Stadium: Stadion Wankdorf; Attendance: 6,000

22 May 1949 24	Cantonal Neuchâtel	0–3	Young Boys	Neuchâtel
				Stadium: Stade de la Maladière; Attendance: 4,800

12 June 1949 26	Young Boys	3–0	Thun	Bern
	Monti; Weil			Stadium: Stadion Wankdorf; Attendance: 4,000

=== Swiss Cup ===
14 November 1948 3rd principal round	Young Boys	3–1	Montreux Sports	Bern
				Stadium: Stadion Wankdorf

26 December 1948 Round of 32	Cantonal Neuchâtel	3–1	Young Boys	Neuchâtel
				Stadium: Stade de la Maladière
