= 2024–25 1. Liga Classic =

1. Liga Classic
- Season: 2024–25
- Dates: 3 August 2024 – 24 May 2025
- Champions: Lausanne-Sport U-21; Grasshopper II; Kreuzlingen
- Promoted: Lausanne-Sport U-21; Kreuzlingen
- Relegated: Köniz; Yverdon-Sport II; Thun U-21; Rotkreuz; Linth 04; Uzwil
- Matches: 720
- Top goalscorer: Stephan Andrist (26)
- All statistics correct as of 11 May 2026.

The 2024–25 1. Liga Classic is the 103rd season of the 1. Liga Classic, the fourth tier of the Swiss football league system. The season began on 3 August 2024 and conclude on 24 May 2025.

== Team changes ==
FC St. Gallen U-21 and Servette FC U-21 were both relegated from the 2023–24 Swiss Promotion League.

== League tables ==
=== Group 1 ===
Pos	Team	Pld	W	D	L	GF	GA	GD	Pts	Status
1	Lausanne-Sport U-21 (C, O, P)	30	19	4	7	82	34	+48	61	Qualification to promotion play-offs
2	Lancy	30	19	4	7	58	29	+29	61	Qualification to promotion play-offs
3	Meyrin	30	19	4	7	56	37	+19	61	Qualification to promotion play-offs
4	Chênois	30	18	6	6	60	31	+29	60	
5	Servette U-21	30	17	7	6	78	45	+33	58	
6	Echallens Région	30	15	5	10	54	39	+15	50	
7	Portalban/Gletterens	30	15	4	11	48	34	+14	49	
8	Naters	30	13	6	11	45	37	+8	45	
9	Sion U-21	30	11	10	9	43	40	+3	43	
10	Stade-Payerne	30	9	8	13	44	47	−3	35	
11	Monthey	30	9	7	14	36	52	−16	34	
12	La Sarraz-Eclépens	30	8	9	13	36	46	−10	33	
13	La Chaux-de-Fonds	30	7	2	21	26	61	−35	23	
14	Coffrane	30	5	8	17	37	81	−44	23	
15	Yverdon-Sport II (R)	30	6	2	22	37	88	−51	20	Relegation to 2. Liga Interregional
16	Köniz (R)	30	5	4	21	32	71	−39	19	Relegation to 2. Liga Interregional

Source: SFA
(C) Champions; (O) Play-off winners; (P) Promoted; (R) Relegated

=== Group 2 ===
Pos	Team	Pld	W	D	L	GF	GA	GD	Pts	Status
1	Grasshopper Club U-21 (C)	30	19	7	4	71	27	+44	64	Qualification to promotion play-offs
2	Prishtina Bern	30	15	9	6	58	36	+22	54	Qualification to promotion play-offs
3	Schötz	30	12	10	8	63	56	+7	46	
4	Black Stars	30	11	11	8	52	47	+5	44	
5	Courtételle	30	11	11	8	34	29	+5	44	
6	Solothurn	30	12	6	12	45	44	+1	42	
7	Münsingen	30	10	10	10	48	38	+10	40	
8	Dietikon	30	10	10	10	36	39	−3	40	
9	Langenthal	30	11	7	12	41	46	−5	40	
10	Bassecourt	30	9	11	10	38	38	0	38	
11	Wohlen	30	10	8	12	38	51	−13	38	
12	Concordia Basel	30	9	9	12	44	45	−1	36	
13	Muttenz	30	10	6	14	51	61	−10	36	
14	Besa Biel/Bienne	30	9	6	15	35	53	−18	33	
15	Thun U-21 (R)	30	6	10	14	44	61	−17	28	Relegation to 2. Liga Interregional
16	Rotkreuz (R)	30	6	9	15	37	64	−27	27	Relegation to 2. Liga Interregional

Source: SFA
(C) Champions; (R) Relegated

=== Group 3 ===
Pos	Team	Pld	W	D	L	GF	GA	GD	Pts	Status
1	Kreuzlingen (C, O, P)	30	17	5	8	54	38	+16	56	Qualification to promotion play-offs
2	YF Juventus	30	16	5	9	62	37	+25	53	Qualification to promotion play-offs
3	Wettswil-Bonstetten	30	15	8	7	48	32	+16	53	Qualification to promotion play-offs
4	St. Gallen 1879 U-21	30	14	10	6	54	31	+23	52	
5	Winterthur U-21	30	14	8	8	61	45	+16	50	
6	Collina d'Oro	30	14	6	10	44	29	+15	48	
7	Tuggen	30	15	3	12	58	44	+14	48	
8	Taverne	30	11	7	12	36	49	−13	40	
9	Kosova	30	10	9	11	37	39	−2	39	
10	Eschen/Mauren	30	11	5	14	40	45	−5	38	
11	Höngg	30	9	10	11	36	40	−4	37	
12	Freienbach	30	11	2	17	43	54	−11	35	
13	Schaffhausen	30	9	7	14	45	62	−17	34	
14	Mendrisio	30	9	5	16	32	46	−14	32	
15	Linth 04 (R)	30	7	7	16	44	76	−32	28	Relegation to 2. Liga Interregional
16	Uzwil (R)	30	6	7	17	40	67	−27	25	Relegation to 2. Liga Interregional

Source: SFA
(C) Champions; (O) Play-off winners; (P) Promoted; (R) Relegated

== Promotion play-offs ==
The promotion play-offs consisted of the top two teams in each group, alongside the two best third-place finishers.

=== Semi-finals ===
==== First Leg ====
28 May 2025
19:30

SC YF Juventus	1–0	Lancy FC
Da Silva Chagas 31'	Report

Juchhof 1, Zurich
Referee: Tobias Wyss
28 May 2025
20:00

FC Prishtina Bern	0–2	FC Kreuzlingen
	Report	Anioke 1'; Rama-Bitterfeld 59'

Kunstrasenfeld Bodenweid 2, Bern
Referee: Joël Brunner
28 May 2025
20:00

FC Wettswil-Bonstetten	1–1	FC Lausanne-Sport U-21
Peter 7'	Report	N'Diaye 19'

Moos, Wettswil, Switzerland
Referee: Alessio Auletta
28 May 2025
20:30

Meyrin FC	1–1	Grasshopper Club Zürich U-21
Zünd 79'	Report	Fiechter 2'

Stade des Arbères, Meyrin
Referee: Paul Henchoz

==== Second Leg ====
31 May 2025
18:00

Lancy FC	0–2	SC YF Juventus
	Report	Da Silva Chagas 31'; Advijaj 49'

Stade de Marignac, Lancy
Referee: Arber Smajli

SC YF Juventus win aggregate 0–3 and reach to final promotion play-off.

31 May 2025
18:00

FC Kreuzlingen	4–1	FC Prishtina Bern
Affentranger 29'; Anioke 35'; Rama-Bitterfeld 43'; Bode 59'	Report	Pajaziti 67'

EC Technik Remu Arena, Kreuzlingen
Referee: Laura Mauricio

FC Kreuzlingen win aggregate 6–1 and reach to final promotion play-off.

31 May 2025
18:00

FC Lausanne-Sport U-21	2–0	FC Wettswil-Bonstetten
Parra 34'; Milovanovic 90'	Report

Stade de la Tuilière, Lausanne
Referee: Malik Temmar

Lausanne-Sport U-21 win aggregate 3–1 and reach to final promotion play-off.

31 May 2025
18:00

Grasshopper Club Zürich U-21	2–1	FC Meyrin
Kabashi 13'; Turhan 88'	Report	Antunes 23'

GC Campus, Zürich
Referee: Luca Schelbli

Grasshopper Club U-21 win aggregate 3–2 and reach to final promotion play-off.

=== Finals ===
==== First Leg ====
4 June 2025
19:30

SC YF Juventus	1–1	FC Lausanne-Sport U-21
Hasani 31'	Report	Renovales 6'

Juchhof, Zurich
Referee: Mujo Dedukic
4 June 2025
20:00

Grasshopper Club Zurich U-21	0–1	FC Kreuzlingen
	Report	Rama-Bitterfeld 31'

GC Campus, Zürich
Referee: Patrick Rogalla

==== Second Leg ====
7 June 2025
18:00

FC Lausanne-Sport U-21	3–1 (a.e.t.)	SC YF Juventus
Lippo 88', 114'; Testa 107'	Report	Hasani 76'

Stade de la Tuilière, Lausanne
Referee: Alexander Tester

Lausanne-Sport U-21 win aggregate 4–2 and promotion to Promotion League.

7 June 2025
18:00

FC Kreuzlingen	3–2	Grasshopper Club Zurich U-21
Seeger 61'; Arifagic 90+1'; Anioke 90+6'	Report	Nigg 74'; Tesfom 75'

EC Technik Remu Arena, Kreuzlingen
Referee: Andrin Borra

FC Kreuzlingen win aggregate 4–2 and promotion to Promotion League.
