= Massimo Rizzo =

Massimo Rizzo may refer to:

- Massimo Rizzo, president of the Legacoop Abitanti cooperative, Piedmont, Italy
- Massimo Rizzo (footballer) (1974–), Swiss former football player and manager
- Massimo Rizzo (ice hockey) (2001–), Canadian ice hockey player
