= Urs Meier (footballer) =

Swiss football manager (born 1961)

Personal information
- Date of birth: 7 July 1961 (age 65)
- Place of birth: Zürich, Switzerland
- Position: Defender

Senior career*
Years	Team	Apps	(Gls)
1983–1986	Zug		
1986–1987	Schaffhausen		
1987–1989	Bellinzona		
1989–1995	Grasshoppers		
1995–1997	FC Altstetten		
2015–2017	FC Fislisbach		

Managerial career
- 1993–1995: Grasshoppers (player-assistant)
- 1995–1997: FC Altstetten (player-manager)
- 1997–1998: FC Altstetten
- 1999–2000: Baden
- 2000–2003: Solothurn
- 2003–2004: Baden
- 2005: Baden (caretaker)
- 2005–2007: Zürich (U18)
- 2006: Liechtenstein (caretaker)
- 2007–2010: Liechtenstein (assistant)
- 2007–2008: Zürich (U21)
- 2008–2010: Zürich (U18)
- 2010–2012: Zürich (U21)
- 2012: Zürich (caretaker)
- 2012–2015: Zürich
- 2017–2019: Ripperswil-Jona
- * Club domestic league appearances and goals

Urs Meier (born 7 July 1961) is a Swiss football manager. He is the previous manager of Zürich in the Swiss Super League.

== Coaching career ==
After working with the youth teams at both Bellinzona and Grasshoppers, Meier worked as a playing assistant manager for Grasshoppers. He then moved to FC Altstetten in 1995 as a playing manager. He decided to retire in 1997, but continued as the manager for the club until 1998. He then moved to Thun and worked with the youth sector until 1999. In the 1999–2000 season, he was the manager of Baden, from 2000 to 2003 for Solothurn and from 2003 to 2004 at Baden again.

He previously coached Baden, Solothurn and the Liechtenstein national football team.

Since the 2017–18 season, he has been the head coach of Ripperswil-Jona in the Challenge League.
