= 1949–50 Nationalliga A =

Swiss football season

Nationalliga A
- Season: 1949–50
- Champions: Servette
- Relegated: St. Gallen; Bern
- Top goalscorer: Jacques Fatton (Servette); 32 goals

Nationalliga B
- Season: 1949–50
- Champions: Cantonal Neuchâtel
- Promoted: Cantonal Neuchâtel; Young Boys
- Relegated: Thun; Brühl
- Top goalscorer: Walter Beerli (Young Boys); 30 goals

The following is the summary of the Swiss National League in the 1949–50 football season, both Nationalliga A and Nationalliga B. This was the 53rd season of top-tier and the 52nd season of second-tier football in Switzerland.

== Overview ==
The Swiss Football Association (ASF/SFV) had 28 member clubs at this time which were divided into two divisions of 14 teams each. The teams played a double round-robin to decide their table positions. Two points were awarded for a win and one point was awarded for a draw. The top tier (NLA) was contested by the top 12 teams from the previous season and the two newly promoted teams St. Gallen and Bern. The last two teams in the league table at the end of the season were to be relegated.

The second-tier (NLB) was contested by the two teams that had been relegated from the NLA at the end of the last season, these were Grasshopper Club and Urania Genève Sport, the ten teams that had been in third to twelfth position last season and the two newly promoted teams from the 1. Liga Étoile-Sporting and Moutier. The top two teams at the end of the season would be promoted to the 1950–51 NLA and the two last placed teams would be relegated to the 1950–51 Swiss 1. Liga.

== Nationalliga A ==
=== Teams, locations ===
Team	Based in	Canton	Stadium	Capacity
FC Basel	Basel	Basel-Stadt	Landhof	4,000
AC Bellinzona	Bellinzona	Ticino	Stadio Comunale Bellinzona	5,000
FC Bern	Bern	Bern	Stadion Neufeld	14,000
FC Biel-Bienne	Biel/Bienne	Bern	Stadion Gurzelen	5,500
FC Chiasso	Chiasso	Ticino	Stadio Comunale Riva IV	4,000
FC Grenchen	Grenchen	Solothurn	Stadium Brühl	15,100
FC La Chaux-de-Fonds	La Chaux-de-Fonds	Neuchâtel	Centre Sportif de la Charrière	10,000
FC Lausanne-Sport	Lausanne	Vaud	Pontaise	30,000
FC Locarno	Locarno	Ticino	Stadio comunale Lido	5,000
FC Lugano	Lugano	Ticino	Cornaredo Stadium	6,330
Servette FC	Geneva	Geneva	Stade des Charmilles	27,000
FC St. Gallen	St. Gallen	St. Gallen	Espenmoos	11,000
FC Young Fellows	Zürich	Zürich	Utogrund	2,850
FC Zürich	Zürich	Zürich	Letzigrund	25,000

=== Final league table ===
Pos	Team	Pld	W	D	L	GF	GA	GD	Pts	Qualification or relegation
1	Servette	26	16	3	7	73	41	+32	35	Swiss Champions
2	Basel	26	14	5	7	48	40	+8	33	
3	Lausanne-Sport	26	12	8	6	57	35	+22	32	Swiss Cup winners
4	Chiasso	26	13	5	8	45	39	+6	31	
5	La Chaux-de-Fonds	26	12	7	7	56	53	+3	31	
6	Zürich	26	12	4	10	59	46	+13	28	
7	Grenchen	26	10	7	9	43	44	−1	27	
8	Bellinzona	26	11	4	11	43	44	−1	26	
9	Lugano	26	9	6	11	47	45	+2	24	
10	Young Fellows Zürich	26	10	4	12	48	50	−2	24	
11	Locarno	26	10	4	12	40	47	−7	24	
12	Biel-Bienne	26	8	6	12	45	42	+3	22	
13	St. Gallen	26	7	2	17	40	79	−39	16	Relegated to 1950–51 NLB
14	Bern	26	4	3	19	31	70	−39	11	Relegated to 1950–51 NLB

Source: rsssf.com
Rules for classification: 1) Points; 2) Goal difference within the league, however with play-off for qualifiers;

=== Results ===
Home \ Away	BAS	BEL	BER	BB	CHI	GRE	CDF	LS	LOC	LUG	SER	STG	YFZ	ZÜR
Basel		1–0	3–1	1–1	0–2	1–1	4–3	2–1	3–0	3–2	4–2	2–0	3–0	3–2
Bellinzona	2–1		2–4	3–1	1–0	3–2	3–1	1–0	0–0	1–1	0–4	3–1	2–3	0–1
Bern	0–4	3–2		1–3	1–3	0–4	3–0	0–4	2–3	1–1	0–2	0–3	1–1	0–5
Biel-Bienne	0–0	4–0	2–1		2–3	0–0	2–3	0–0	1–0	3–1	0–1	2–0	6–0	3–3
Chiasso	2–1	1–1	2–0	1–0		4–0	5–2	0–0	2–1	1–3	0–4	2–0	1–0	2–0
Grenchen	2–2	1–2	4–1	5–1	1–2		2–3	3–2	3–2	2–1	2–0	0–0	2–1	1–2
La Chaux-de-Fonds	0–2	3–1	3–2	1–0	3–3	1–1		1–1	1–1	0–0	3–3	5–1	6–2	3–2
Lausanne-Sports	2–2	2–1	3–0	3–2	4–2	1–1	1–1		3–1	1–0	0–2	7–3	0–0	1–1
Locarno	5–0	1–2	1–0	2–4	3–3	3–0	0–2	0–5		1–0	1–0	5–1	3–1	1–0
Lugano	1–2	3–2	1–1	2–1	3–0	1–1	4–2	3–0	5–3		2–4	3–1	3–1	2–3
Servette	2–0	1–1	5–3	3–2	2–1	5–1	6–1	1–4	5–0	3–1		8–0	2–4	3–1
St. Gallen	3–0	2–6	0–3	4–3	3–1	5–1	2–3	0–4	0–1	3–2	3–3		3–1	0–3
Young Fellows	1–2	3–1	3–1	2–0	3–1	1–2	0–1	5–1	2–2	2–2	4–1	4–2		3–0
Zürich	5–2	0–3	6–2	2–2	1–1	0–1	2–4	3–7	2–0	3–0	3–1	7–0	2–1	

Source: rsssf.com
Legend: Blue = home team win; Yellow = draw; Red = away team win.

=== Topscorers ===
Rank	Player	Nat.	Goals	Club
1.	Jacques Fatton	(Switzerland)	32	Servette
2.	Ledio Zanetti	(Switzerland)	20	Zürich
3.	Robert Ballaman	(Switzerland)	18	Biel-Bienne
4.	Charles Antenen	(Switzerland)	17	La Chaux-de-Fonds
5.	Hans-Peter Friedländer	(Switzerland)	15	Lausanne-Sport
6.	Robert Hasler	(Switzerland)	14	Lugano
6.	René Maillard	(Switzerland)	14	Lausanne-Sport
8.	Gottlieb Stäuble	(Switzerland)	13	Basel
8.	Bruno Ernst	(Switzerland)	13	Locarno
8.	Kurt Bertsch	(Switzerland)	13	St. Gallen

== Nationalliga B ==
=== Teams, locations ===
Team	Based in	Canton	Stadium	Capacity
FC Aarau	Aarau	Aargau	Stadion Brügglifeld	9,240
SC Brühl	St. Gallen	St. Gallen	Paul-Grüninger-Stadion	4,200
FC Cantonal Neuchâtel	Neuchâtel	Neuchâtel	Stade de la Maladière	25,500
FC Étoile-Sporting	La Chaux-de-Fonds	Neuchâtel	Les Foulets / Terrain des Eplatures	1,000 / 500
FC Fribourg	Fribourg	Fribourg	Stade Universitaire	9,000
Grasshopper Club Zürich	Zürich	Zürich	Hardturm	20,000
FC Luzern	Lucerne	Lucerne	Stadion Allmend	25,000
FC Mendrisio	Mendrisio	Ticino	Centro Sportivo Comunale	4,000
FC Moutier	Moutier	Bern	Stade de Chalière	5,000
FC Nordstern Basel	Basel	Basel-Stadt	Rankhof	7,600
FC Thun	Thun	Bern	Stadion Lachen	10,350
Urania Genève Sport	Genève	Geneva	Stade de Frontenex	4,000
BSC Young Boys	Bern	Bern	Wankdorf Stadium	56,000
SC Zug	Zug	Zug	Herti Allmend Stadion	6,000

=== Final league table ===
Pos	Team	Pld	W	D	L	GF	GA	GD	Pts	Qualification or relegation
1	FC Cantonal Neuchâtel	26	19	5	2	86	35	+51	43	NLB champions and promoted to 1950–51 Nationalliga A
2	BSC Young Boys	26	19	2	5	95	43	+52	40	Promoted to 1950–51 Nationalliga A
3	Grasshopper Club Zürich	26	15	4	7	81	35	+46	34	
4	FC Nordstern Basel	26	12	4	10	44	46	−2	28	
5	FC Aarau	26	12	3	11	47	50	−3	27	
6	Urania Genève Sport	26	8	9	9	39	36	+3	25	
7	FC Fribourg	26	10	5	11	38	44	−6	25	
8	FC Mendrisio	26	9	6	11	38	47	−9	24	
9	FC Étoile-Sporting	26	9	5	12	53	60	−7	23	
10	FC Luzern	26	8	7	11	50	67	−17	23	
11	FC Moutier	26	10	3	13	32	57	−25	23	
12	SC Zug	26	6	8	12	42	57	−15	20	
13	FC Thun	26	6	3	17	40	68	−28	15	Relegated to 1950–51 1. Liga
14	SC Brühl	26	7	0	19	30	70	−40	14	Relegated to 1950–51 1. Liga

Source: RSSSF
Rules for classification: 1) Points; 2) Goal difference within the league, however with play-off for qualifiers;

== Further in Swiss football ==
- 1949–50 Swiss Cup
- 1949–50 Swiss 1. Liga

== Sources ==
- Switzerland 1949–50 at RSSSF

Preceded by 1948–49	Nationalliga seasons in Switzerland	Succeeded by 1950–51
