= Silas Huber =

Swiss footballer (born 2005)

Personal information
- Full name: Silas Simon Huber
- Date of birth: 10 July 2005 (age 21)
- Place of birth: Aarau, Switzerland
- Height: 1.97 m (6 ft 6 in)
- Position: Goalkeeper

Team information
- Current team: FC Zürich
- Number: 1

Youth career
- 2013–2015: FC Entfelden
- 2015–2023: FC Aarau

Senior career*
Years	Team	Apps	(Gls)
2023–	FC Zürich U21	24	(0)
2025–	FC Zürich	21	(0)

International career^{‡}
2021–2022	Switzerland U17	4	(0)
2023	Switzerland U18	3	(0)
2023–2024	Switzerland U19	8	(0)
2024	Switzerland U20	3	(0)
2025–	Switzerland U21	8	(0)
- * Club domestic league appearances and goals as of 28 September 2026 ‡ National team caps and goals as of 13:52, 15 April 2026 (UTC)

Silas Simon Huber (born 10 July 2005) is a Swiss professional footballer who plays as a goalkeeper for Swiss Super League club FC Zürich.

== Club career ==
Huber is a product of the youth academies of the Swiss clubs FC Entfelden and FC Aarau. On 23 June 2023, he transferred to FC Zürich, where he was originally assigned to their reserves. On 2 October 2024 he was promoted as FC Zürich's third goalkeeper on a contract until 2028. He made his senior and professional debut with FC Zürich in a 3–0 Swiss Super League loss over BSC Young Boys on 1 February 2026.

== International career ==
Huber is a youth international for Switzerland, and was called up to the Switzerland U21s for a set of 2027 UEFA European Under-21 Championship qualification matches in October 2025.

He was one of the 24 players who were called up with the Switzerland national team by head coach Murat Yakin for the 2026–27 UEFA Nations League B matches against Slovenia on 13 November and Scotland on 16 November 2026.
