= Massimo Rizzo (footballer) =

Swiss footballer (born 1974)

Personal information
- Date of birth: 14 March 1974 (age 52)
- Height: 1.78 m (5 ft 10 in)
- Position: Defender

Youth career
- –1992: FC Zürich

Senior career*
Years	Team	Apps	(Gls)
1992–1994	FC Wettingen		
1994–1997	FC Baden		
1997–1998	SC YF Juventus		
1998–2004	FC Wil 1900		
2004–2005	FC Schaffhausen		
2005–2006	FC Zürich		
2006–2010	FC United Zürich		

Managerial career
- 2013–2015: FC Zürich (assistant)
- 2015: FC Zürich
- 2015–2016: FC Zürich (assistant)
- 2020–2021: FC Zürich
- * Club domestic league appearances and goals

Massimo Rizzo (born 14 March 1974) is a Swiss football manager and former player. He last managed Swiss club FC Zürich.
