= Walter Schneiter =

Swiss footballer (1918–1975)

Personal information
- Date of birth: 18 June 1918
- Place of birth: Switzerland
- Date of death: 18 December 1975 (aged 57)
- Position: Forward

Senior career*
Years	Team	Apps	(Gls)
- FC Zürich

International career
1949–1950	Switzerland	3	(0)
- * Club domestic league appearances and goals

Walter Schneiter (18 June 1918 – 18 December 1975) was a Swiss football forward who played for Switzerland in the 1950 FIFA World Cup. He also played for FC Zürich.
