= Sportplatz Hafenareal =

Stadium in Kreuzlingen, Switzerland

Coordinates: 47.6540°N 9.1806°E

Sportplatz Hafenareal is a stadium in Kreuzlingen, Switzerland. The stadium has a capacity for 1,100 people.

It is currently used for football matches and is the home ground of FC Kreuzlingen. The capacity is 1,200. The stadium has 200 seats and 1,000 standing places. The stadium is part of a complex on the banks of Lake Constance in the port area of Kreuzlingen. In 2007 a new club house was erected.
