= Walter Bosshard (footballer) =

Swiss footballer (1921–1984)

Personal information
- Date of birth: 17 January 1921
- Place of birth: Switzerland
- Date of death: 3 February 1984 (aged 63)
- Position: Forward

Senior career*
Years	Team	Apps	(Gls)
1936–1955	FC Zürich	386	(234)
1946–1948	FC Basel	1	(0)
1948–1949	Vevey-Sports	17	(0)
- * Club domestic league appearances and goals

Walter Bosshard (17 January 1921 – 3 February 1984) was a Swiss footballer who played as a forward.

Bosshard joined Basel's first team in their 1946–47 season. He played his domestic league debut for the club in the away game on 28 June 1947 as Basel was beaten 3–1 by Grenchen. Between the years 1946 and 1948 Bossard played a total of three games for Basel without scoring a goal. One of these games was in the Nationalliga A and two were friendly games.

Following his time in Basel, Bossard joined Vevey-Sports who played in the second tier of Swiss football at that time.

Bossard died on 3 February 1984, at the age of 63.

== Sources ==
- Rotblau: Jahrbuch Saison 2017/2018. Publisher: FC Basel Marketing AG. ISBN 978-3-7245-2189-1
- Die ersten 125 Jahre. Publisher: Josef Zindel im Friedrich Reinhardt Verlag, Basel. ISBN 978-3-7245-2305-5
- Verein "Basler Fussballarchiv" Homepage

(NB: Despite all efforts, the editors of these books and the authors in "Basler Fussballarchiv" have failed to be able to identify all the players, their date and place of birth or date and place of death, who played in the games during the early years of FC Basel)
