= FC Kreuzlingen =

Swiss football club

- Full name: Football Club Kreuzlingen
- Founded: 1905; 121 years ago
- Ground: Sportplatz Hafenareal, Kreuzlingen
- Capacity: 1,200 (200 seated)
- President: Bujar Emini
- Manager: Michael Pfister
- League: Promotion League
- 2024–25: 1. Liga Classic Group 3, 1st of 16 (promoted via play-off)
Home colours	Away colours

FC Kreuzlingen is a Swiss football club from the town of Kreuzlingen in Canton Thurgau, the German-speaking region of Switzerland. The team currently play in Promotion League, the third tier of Swiss football after promotion from 1. Liga Classic in 2024–25.

== History ==
- In 1934, the club gained promotion to the Swiss Super League but refused to make the step up on financial grounds.
- In 2003–04, the club narrowly missed out on promotion to the Challenge League.
- In 2024–25, the club secure promotion to Promotion League from next season after win against Grasshopper Club II 3–2 and aggregate 4–2.

== Current squad ==
As of 20 September 2026

Note: Flags indicate national team as defined under FIFA eligibility rules; some limited exceptions apply. Players may hold more than one non-FIFA nationality.

No.	Pos.	Nation	Player
1	GK	SUI	Robin Belser
4	DF	SUI	Yves Seeger
7	MF	SUI	Sandro Di Nucci
9	FW	SUI	Uchenna Anioke
10	FW	SUI	Levin Nay
11	FW	ALG	Reda Laidouci
12	DF	SUI	Enrique Wild
17	MF	GER	Adrian Rama-Bitterfeld
18	DF	KOS	Bleron Mustafa
19	DF	MKD	Ensar Ismaili
20	DF	SUI	Aldin Alili
21	DF	SUI	Giosue Capozzi
22	MF	GER	Simon Tisch-Rottensteiner (on loan from Wil)

No.	Pos.	Nation	Player
24	DF	SUI	Simon Affentranger
25	DF	GER	Mokhtar Boulachab
26	DF	GER	Bennet Ukaj
28	GK	SUI	Fabian Fellmann
31	MF	SUI	Noah Leao Muata
37	MF	GER	Abbas Karaki
42	DF	TUR	Umut Gencoglu
51	MF	SUI	Mihael Cavar (on loan from Zürich)
73	DF	GER	Tristan Matkovic Torrecillas
77	MF	CRO	Mateo Marinovic
90	GK	POR	Luís Reis
98	FW	SUI	Leart Zeqiri Kabashi
99	FW	SUI	Alen Camdzic (on loan from Rapperswil-Jona)

== Stadium ==
The club play their home games at Sportplatz Hafenareal. The capacity is 1,200. The stadium has 200 seats and 1,000 standing places. The stadium is part of a complex on the banks of Lake Constance in the port area of the Freuzlingen. In 2007 a new club house was erected.

== Honours ==
- 1. Liga Classic
  - Champions: 2024–25

== Supporters ==
In 1997 a small ground of fans got together to form a supports group called the Whiskeykurve; they stand at an end of the ground in a stand of the same name.
