= FC Concordia Basel =

Swiss football club

Concordia Basel
- Full name: Fussballclub Concordia Basel
- Nickname(s): Congeli
- Founded: 1907; 118 years ago
- Ground: Leichtathletikstadion, St. Jakob, Basel
- Capacity: 6,000
- Chairman: Balz Bigler
- Manager: Samir Tabakovic
- League: 1. Liga Classic
- 2024–25: Group 2, 12th of 16
Home colours	Away colours

FC Concordia Basel is a Swiss football club based in Basel. The club was founded in 1907. They currently play in the 1. Liga Classic, the fourth tier of Swiss football and their home stadium was Rankhof Stadium until the 2008–09 season.

Concordia is ranking as the number 3 club of Switzerland in the all-time table of the 1. Liga. They won the Och Cup (considered as the former Swiss Cup) in 1922. It is the club's only title.

== History ==
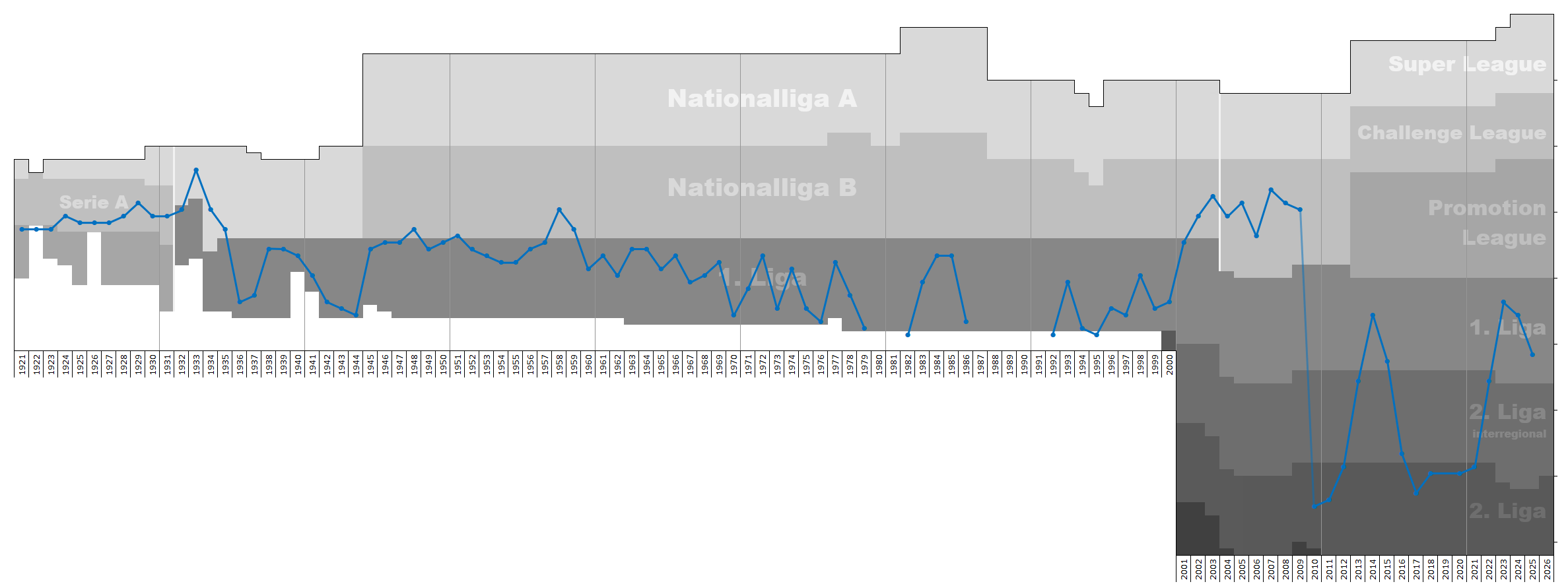
Chart of FC Concordia Basel table positions in the Swiss football league system

In September 2008, Concordia Basel became the first football club in Western Europe to sign North Korean players when they signed North Korea internationals Pak Chol-Ryong and Kim Kuk-Jin.

FC Concordia Basel has been cooperating with FC Basel in the past. FC Concordia Basel has recently won clashes with some major clubs such as FC Basel and Young Boys.
