= FC Zürich =

Professional association football club in Zürich, Switzerland

Zürich
- Full name: Fussballclub Zürich
- Short name: FCZ
- Founded: 1 August 1896; 130 years ago
- Stadium: Letzigrund
- Capacity: 26,105
- President: Ancillo Canepa
- Head coach: Marcel Koller
- League: Swiss Super League
- 2025–26: Swiss Super League, 10th of 12
- Website: fcz.ch
| Home colours | Away colours |

Fussballclub Zürich, commonly abbreviated to FC Zürich or simply FCZ, is a professional football club based in Zurich, Switzerland. The club was founded in 1896 and has won the Swiss Super League thirteen times and the Swiss Cup ten times. Their most recent titles are the 2022 Swiss Super League and the 2018 Swiss Cup. The club plays its home games at the Letzigrund, which has a capacity of around 26,000 for league games and which it shares with city rivals Grasshopper Club Zurich.

FC Zürich is the only Swiss team to have reached the semi-finals of the European Cup more than once. This happened in 1964 and 1977 when the competition was played in its original format. FC Zürich co-founder, first captain and honorary member was Joan Gamper, who grew up in Zurich and later moved to Catalonia, founding Barcelona there in 1899. Since the 1960s, FC Zürich plays in all-white, which is one of the city's colours.

The women's club, FC Zürich Frauen, compete in the Swiss Women's Super League. They are the most successful club in Switzerland with 22 championship titles and multiple Champions League participations. The team's roots originate from the first Swiss women's football club, DFC Zürich.

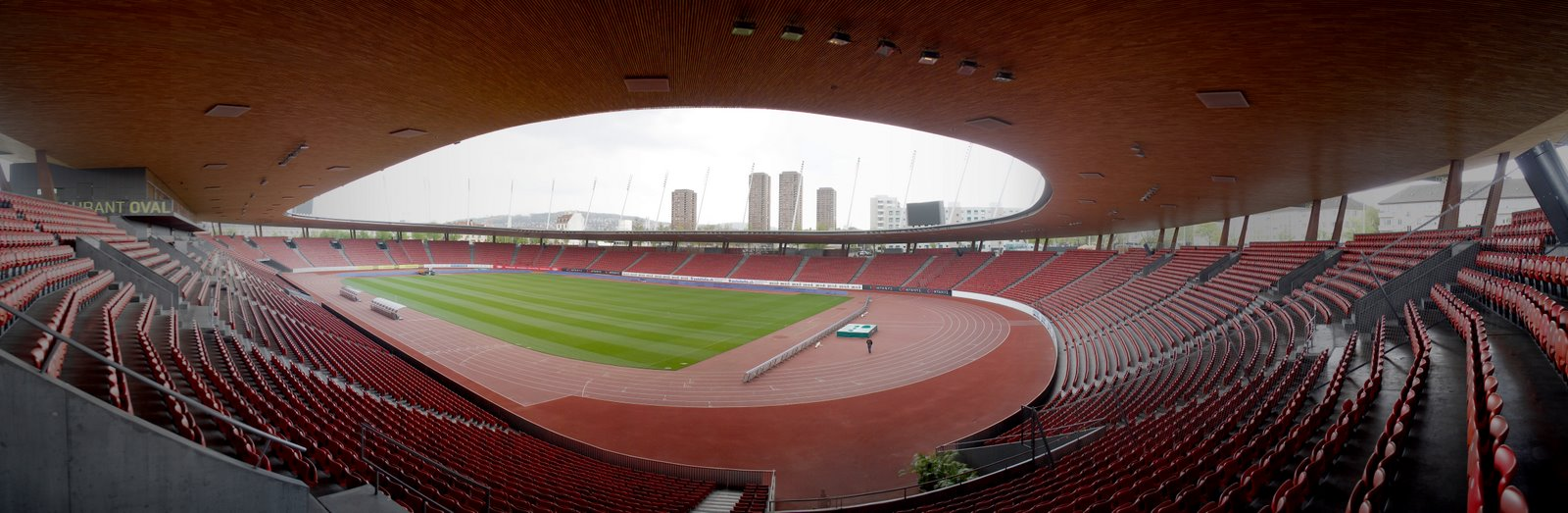
FC Zürich Stadium Letzigrund

== History ==
=== 1896–1924 ===
The club was founded in summer 1896 by former members of the two local clubs: FC Turicum and FC Excelsior. Later, the official founding date was set at 1 August 1896. One of the founding members was the later Barcelona founder Joan Gamper, who coached and played for FC Excelsior and its successor from 1894 to 1897. The new club played its first game on 30 August 1896 on Velorennbahn Hardau in Zurich against St. Gallen, which resulted in a 3–3 draw. In 1898, FC Excelsior merged with FC Zürich, and local club FC Victoria joined shortly thereafter.

The debut game was in 1896 with the colours blue and white. The colours were changed to red and white because rivals Grasshopper Club Zurich had the same colours. When Grasshoppers temporarily retired from the championship in 1909, FCZ returned to the colors blue and white, which they continue to use. Zürich won its first title in the Swiss Serie A in 1901–02, but did not win it again until 1923–24.

Until the 1930s, the club's sporting remit included rowing, boxing, athletics and handball, but football would become the focus of the club.

=== 1925–1960 ===
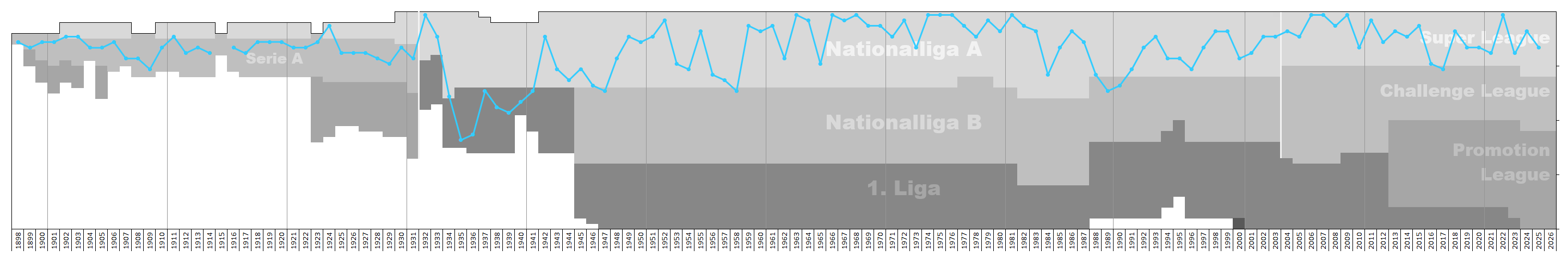
Chart of FC Zürich table positions in the Swiss football league system

Zürich struggled to overcome an unsuccessful record and was described as the "wilderness years" from 1925 to 1960. They were relegated in 1933–34, playing in the 1. Liga until the 1941 season. In 1940–41, they returned to the Nationalliga, where they stayed until their relegation in 1945–46. They were back in the Nationalliga A in 1947–48 and stayed in the top flight until relegated in 1956–57. They were promoted from the Nationalliga B to contest the 1958–59 Nationalliga A, finishing in third place.

=== 1960–1981 ===
This period was known as the "Golden Years" by the FCZ faithful. At this time, the club was run by the president Edwin Nägeli and had players such as Köbi Kuhn, Fritz Künzli, Ilija Katić, René Botteron and many more. Zürich won seven championships in the years 1963, 1966, 1968, 1974, 1975, 1976 and 1981. They also won the Swiss Cup five times: in 1966, 1970, 1972, 1973 and 1976. FCZ also had much success internationally in reaching the semi-finals of the European Cup 1963–64, before losing to Real Madrid and also reaching the semi-finals in the European Cup 1976–77, where they lost to Liverpool.

=== 1981–2005 ===
Following the club's league title in 1981, the club went into a decline, and in 1988 they were relegated to the Nationalliga B. Zürich returned to the top league in 1990. The club did make it to last 16 of the UEFA Cup 1998–99, but were beaten by Roma. The club won the Swiss Cup in 2000, beating Lausanne in the final. They won it again in 2005, beating Luzern.

=== 2006–2016 ===
| Season | League | Ø Attendance | Rank |
|---|---|---|---|
| 2006 | SL | 10,008 | 1/10 |
| 2007 | SL | 10,870 | 1/10 |
| 2008 | SL | 12,186 | 3/10 |
| 2009 | SL | 9,829 | 1/10 |
| 2010 | SL | 10,700 | 7/10 |
| 2011 | SL | 11,750 | 2/10 |
| 2012 | SL | 10,511 | 6/10 |
| 2013 | SL | 10,741 | 4/10 |
| 2014 | SL | 9,564 | 5/10 |
| 2015 | SL | 9,389 | 3/10 |
| 2016 | SL | 8,701 | 10/10 |
| 2017 | SL | 9,702 | 1/10 |
| 2018 | SL | 10,726 | 4/10 |
| 2019 | SL | 10,660 | 7/10 |
| 2020 | SL | 6,422 | 7/10 |
| 2021 | SL | 91 | 8/10 |
| 2022 | SL | 13,396 | 1/10 |
| 2023 | SL | 15,387 | 8/10 |
| 2024 | SL | 15,710 | 4/12 |
| 2025 | SL | 15,710 | 7/12 |
| 2026 | SL | 15,710 | 10/12 |

On 13 May 2006, FCZ ended their 25-year effort to win Super League with a goal in the 93rd minute by Iulian Filipescu against Basel. The goal gave FCZ a 2–1 victory based on goal difference. They retained the title in 2006–07.

In 2008, the local women's team, FFC Zürich Seebach, was combined with FC Zürich and played in the Swiss national league under the name FC Zürich Frauen.

In the 2007–08 season, FCZ finished in third place. In a 2008–09 season match, they edged past Young Boys to win the league title. In 2009, they made their debut play in the group stage of the UEFA Champions League. In the 2010–11 season, FCZ finished second. The following seasons, they finished mostly in mid-table positions. FCZ won the Swiss Cup 2014 in extra time against Basel 2–0.

In the 2015–16 season, the club finished last, one point behind Lugano, and was relegated to the Swiss Challenge League. Four days after the final game of the season, FCZ won the Swiss Cup 2016, beating Lugano 1–0.

=== Recent years ===
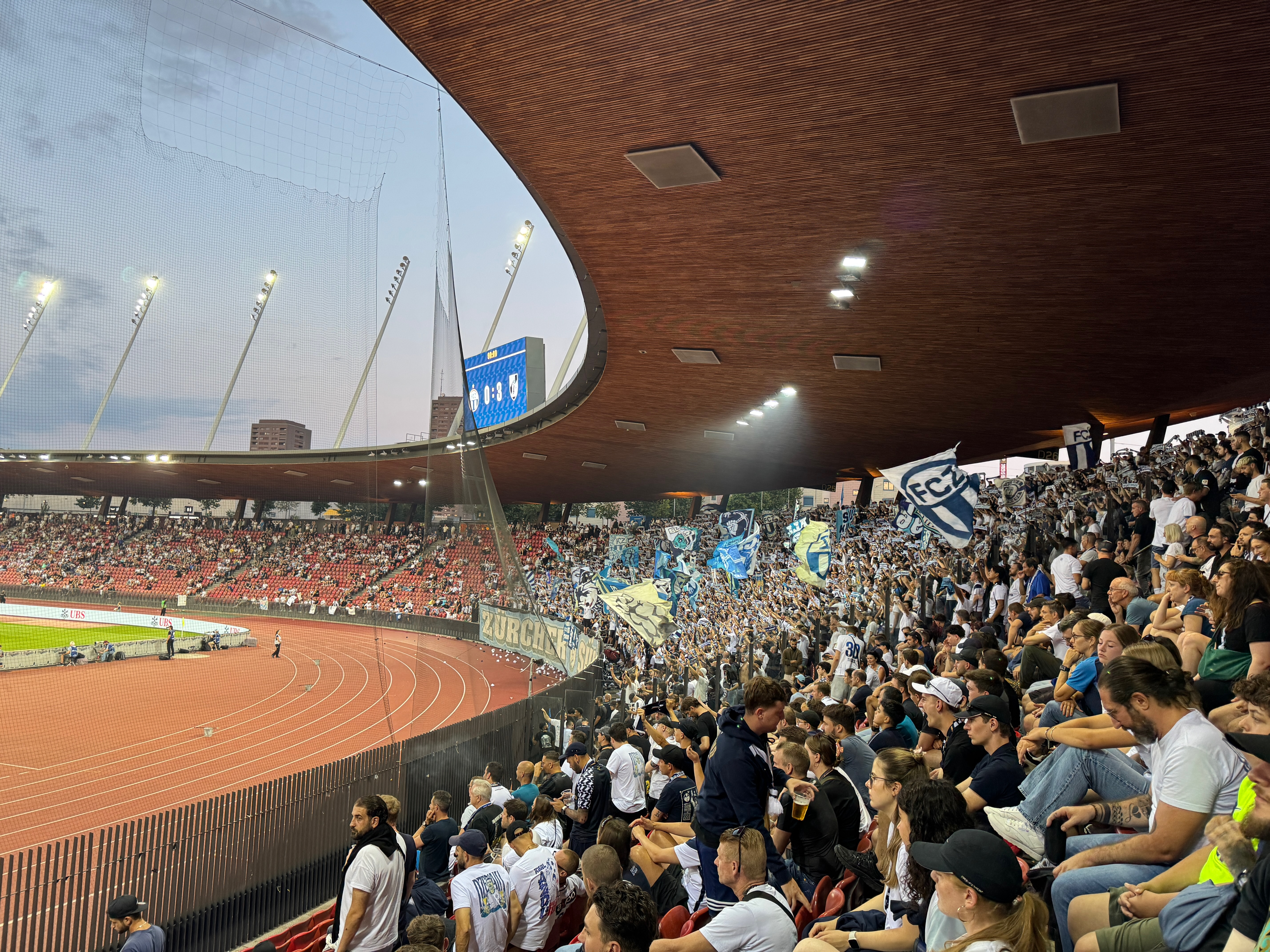
FC Zürich fans at the Letzigrund in 2024

In the 2016–17 season, FC Zürich won the Challenge League ahead of Neuchâtel Xamax, and returned after one year to the Super League. In the 2017–2018 season they finished fourth. On 27 May 2018, they won the Swiss Cup for the tenth time, beating Young Boys 2–1.

In the 2021–2022 season, FC Zürich won the Super League again after an interruption of thirteen years. The club secured its thirteenth league title with a 2–0 away win over Basel, who finished second, with five rounds to go. Despite this success, coach André Breitenreiter departed the club to join Bundesliga side TSG Hoffenheim. On 8 June 2022, former Austrian national coach Franco Foda was announced as the coach for the upcoming season. Despite being able to guide Zürich into the Europa League group stages, the domestic campaign saw the side gain only two points out of a possible 24 in their title defence. The league form, combined with a shock cup defeat to Challenge League side Lausanne on 18 September, proved the final straw and Foda was sacked on 21 September.

In 2024, Ricardo Moniz was appointed head coach on a two-year contract. He was dismissed on 27 May 2025. He was replaced four days later by Mitchell van der Gaag. Van der Gaag was sacked on 23 October, with club president Ancillo Canepa stating that he felt the team had "become stagnant".

Dennis Hediger was named head coach on 1 January 2026, having led the team in the interim since van der Gaag's departure.

== Honours ==
=== National ===
- Super League/Nationalliga A
  - Champions (13): 1901–02, 1923–24, 1962–63, 1965–66, 1967–68, 1973–74, 1974–75, 1975–76, 1980–81, 2005–06, 2006–07, 2008–09, 2021–22
  - Runners-up (9): 1902–03, 1910–11, 1931–32, 1951–52, 1963–64, 1966–67, 1971–72, 1978–79, 2010–11
- Challenge League/Nationalliga B:
  - Champions (4): 1940–41, 1946–47, 1957–58, 2016–17
  - Runners-up (2): 1988–89, 1989–90
- Swiss Cup
  - Winners (10): 1965–66, 1969–70, 1971–72, 1972–73, 1975–76, 1999–2000, 2004–05, 2013–14, 2015–16, 2017–18
  - Runners-up (1): 1980–81
- Swiss League Cup
  - Winners (1): 1980–81
  - Runners-up (2): 1974–75, 1975–76

=== International ===
- European Cup/UEFA Champions League
  - Semi-finalists: 1963–64, 1976–77

== Rivalries ==
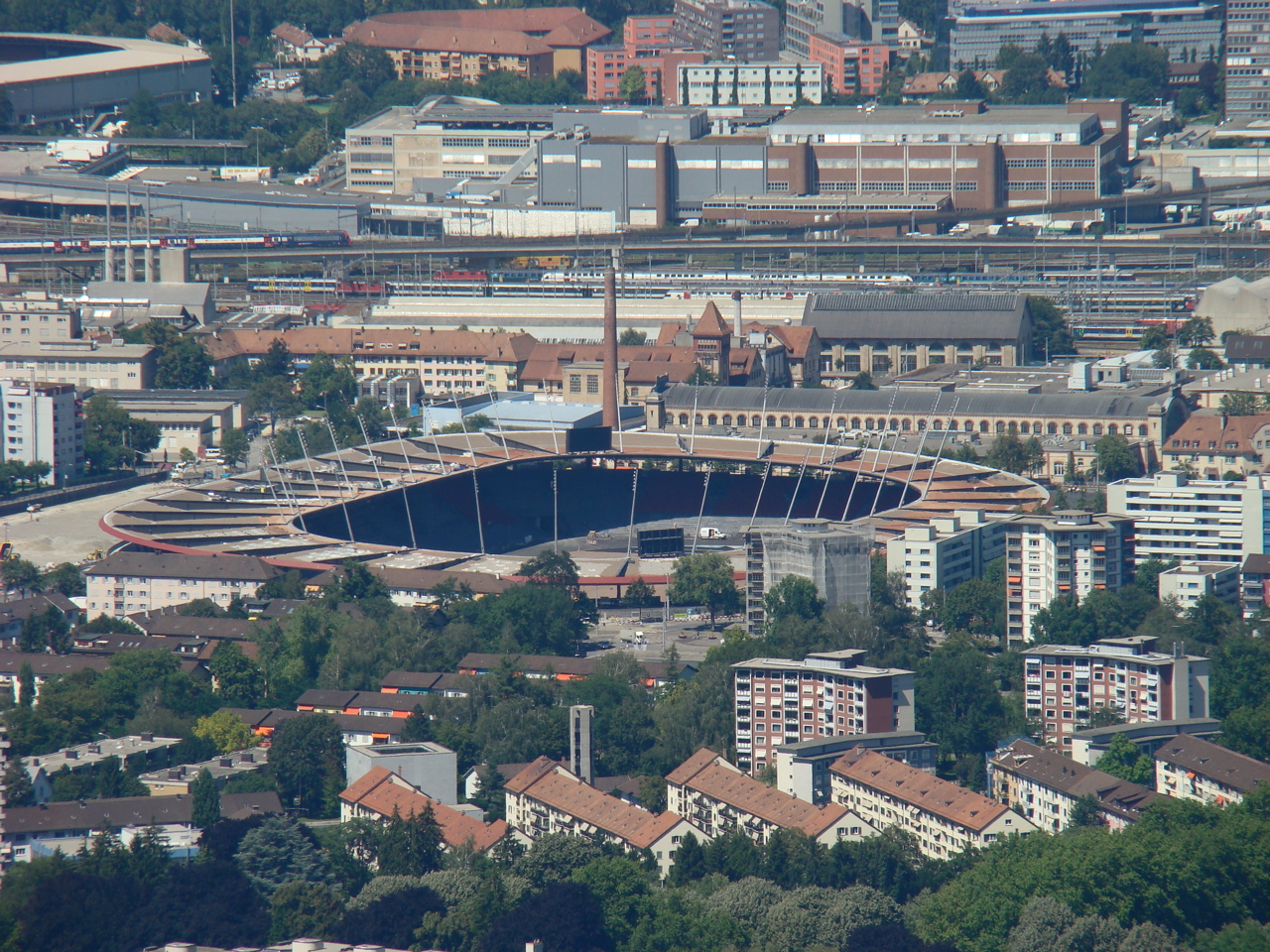
Letzigrund

Grasshoppers, also from Zürich, and Basel are the main rivals of FCZ. Due to the intense rivalry, these matches are so-called high-risk fixtures, with an increased police presence in and around the stadium.

=== Zürich ===
Since its inception, FCZ has always had a fiery relationship with neighbouring club Grasshopper over sporting supremacy in the city. To date, 251 official derbies have been held, with Grasshoppers leading with 121 wins to FC Zurich's 90, leaving 39 draws; however, since the reformation of the Swiss Super League in 2003, FCZ has frequently got the better of their city rivals, winning 33 out of 68 games (GC won 20 and 15 draws).

The October 2011 derby at Letzigrund was abandoned by the referee after rioting by FC Zürich fans. Earlier in the day, Grasshopper Club Zurich fans stole FC Zürich fan banners and displayed them with a message mocking FC Zürich.

=== Final vs. Basel, 13 May 2006 ===
Before the last round of the 2005–06 Swiss Super League, Zürich were three points behind Basel in the league table. The last game of the season was contested by these two clubs vying for the league title at St. Jakob Park, Basel. Alhassane Keita scored the match first goal, for Zürich. In the second half, Mladen Petrić equalised. Basel were seconds away from the title when, in the 93rd minute, Florian Stahel passed the ball to Iulian Filipescu, who scored. Zürich's success at 2–1 was attributed to their superior goal difference. Following the final whistle, Basel supporters stormed the pitch and attacked players on both teams.

== Infrastructure ==
In 2010, the youth and women's teams of the club moved their homebase to the Heerenschürli sport park, in the Hirzenbach quarter of the city, where the academy and women's teams play also their home matches. In June 2022, the club moved with the opening of a newly built "House of FCZ" also their Super League team and offices there in order to have the whole organisation under one roof.

== Players ==
=== Current squad ===
As of 6 September 2026

Note: Flags indicate national team as defined under FIFA eligibility rules; some limited exceptions apply. Players may hold more than one non-FIFA nationality.

| No. | Pos. | Nation | Player |
|---|---|---|---|
| 1 | GK | SUI | Silas Huber |
| 2 | DF | KOS | Lindrit Kamberi (captain) |
| 3 | DF | SUI | Selmin Hodža |
| 4 | DF | COL | Jorge Segura |
| 6 | MF | ITA | Cosimo Fiorini |
| 7 | MF | KOS | Bledian Krasniqi |
| 8 | DF | CUW | Livano Comenencia |
| 11 | FW | NGR | Umeh Emmanuel |
| 12 | GK | UKR | Yevhen Morozov |
| 13 | GK | AUT | Heinz Lindner |
| 14 | MF | SUI | Nevio Di Giusto |
| 17 | MF | SUI | Kevin Spadanuda |
| 18 | MF | GUI | Mohamed Bangoura |
| 19 | FW | SEN | Philippe Kény |
| 21 | MF | SUI | Leandro Schödler |

| No. | Pos. | Nation | Player |
|---|---|---|---|
| 22 | DF | CIV | Chris Kablan |
| 23 | MF | KOS | Valon Berisha |
| 24 | FW | MAR | Mohamed Essakkati |
| 27 | DF | SUI | Ilan Sauter |
| 28 | FW | SUI | Mario Greco |
| 29 | FW | GHA | Damienus Reverson |
| 38 | MF | SUI | Miguel Reichmuth |
| 42 | DF | GER | Alexander Hack |
| 43 | DF | SUI | Neil Volken |
| 44 | DF | SUI | Sebastian Walker |
| 46 | MF | SUI | Jill Stiel |
| 47 | DF | SUI | Doron Lichtenstein |
| 48 | DF | NGR | Kelechi Ihendu |
| 49 | FW | BIH | Din Ramić |
| 60 | GK | GHA | Tyrese Pinthus |

==== Out on loan ====
Note: Flags indicate national team as defined under FIFA eligibility rules; some limited exceptions apply. Players may hold more than one non-FIFA nationality.

| No. | Pos. | Nation | Player |
|---|---|---|---|
| — | DF | SUI | Yuro Bohon Diet (at Kriens until 30 June 2027) |
| — | DF | SUI | Marlon Schwarz (at Wohlen until 30 June 2027) |
| — | MF | SUI | Mihael Cavar (at Kreuzlingen until 30 June 2027) |

| No. | Pos. | Nation | Player |
|---|---|---|---|
| — | MF | SUI | Aaron Tchamda (at Torino U19 until 30 June 2027) |
| — | FW | KEN | Damien Odera (at Otrant-Olympic until 30 June 2027) |
| — | FW | SUI | Pascal Utz (at Kriens until 30 June 2027) |

=== Notable former players ===
As of 15 March 2016

Players and managers admitted to the FC Zurich Hall of Fame

- Jakob Kuhn
- Walter Bosshard
- Urs Fischer
- Fritz Künzli
- Rosario Martinelli
- Almen Abdi
- Lucien Favre
- Joan Gamper
- Karl Grob
- Daniel Gygax
- Daniel Jeandupeux
- Timo Konietzka
- Werner Leimgruber
- Louis Maurer
- Raimondo Ponte
- Ike Shorunmu
- Klaus Stürmer
- Hannu Tihinen
- René Botteron
- Frédéric Chassot
- Josip Drmić
- Blerim Džemaili
- Iulian Filipescu
- Jurica Jerković
- Alhassane Keita
- Shabani Nonda
- Peter Risi
- Wynton Rufer
- Albert Schnorf
- Paul Sturzenegger

Players for the Swiss national football team

- Almen Abdi
- Heinz Bäni
- Heinz Barmettler
- Loris Benito
- Thomas Bickel
- René Botteron
- René Brodmann
- Patrick Bühlmann
- Sandro Burki
- Pierre-Albert Chapuisat
- Frédéric Chassot
- Davide Chiumiento
- Joël Corminbœuf
- Francesco Di Jorio
- Josip Drmić
- Blerim Džemaili
- Ruedi Elsener
- Nico Elvedi
- Urs Fischer
- Mario Gavranović
- Christoph Gilli
- Marco Grassi
- Karl Grob
- René Hasler
- Marc Hodel
- Josef Hügi
- Gökhan Inler
- Daniel Jeandupeux
- Sébastien Jeanneret
- Stephan Keller
- Fritz Kehl
- Jakob Kuhn
- Fritz Künzli
- Adrian Kunz
- August Lehmann
- Werner Leimgruber
- Johnny Leoni
- Heinz Lüdi
- Erni Maissen
- Ludovic Magnin
- Xavier Margairaz
- Peter Marti
- Giuseppe Mazzarelli
- Admir Mehmedi
- Severino Minelli
- André Muff
- Alain Nef
- Dimitri Oberlin
- Bećir Omeragić
- Marco Pascolo
- Yvan Quentin
- Peter Risi
- Alain Rochat
- Ricardo Rodríguez
- Ernst Rutschmann
- Marco Schönbächler
- Werner Schley
- Walter Schneiter
- David Sesa
- Simon Sohm
- Adolf Stelzer
- Jörg Stiel
- Pirmin Stierli
- Xavier Stierli
- Jürg Studer
- Scott Sutter
- Markus Tanner
- Sirio Vernati
- Steve von Bergen
- Johan Vonlanthen
- René Weiler
- Adrian Winter
- Rolf Wüthrich
- Gian-Pietro Zappa
- Hans-Peter Zwicker

Players with World Cup appearances for their national teams

Bulgaria

- Borislav Mihaylov

Czechslovakia

- Jan Berger

Denmark

- Peter Møller

France

- Jean-Marc Ferreri

Germany

- Norbert Eder

Italy

- Roberto Di Matteo

Ivory Coast

- Kanga Akale

New Zealand

- Wynton Rufer

Nigeria

- Ike Shorunmu
- Rashidi Yekini

Romania

- Iulian Filipescu
- Adrian Ilie

Russia

- Aleksandr Kerzhakov

South Africa

- Shaun Bartlett

Sweden

- Tomas Brolin
- Roger Ljung
- Jonas Thern
- Conny Torstensson

Tunisia

- Francileudo Santos
- Yassine Chikhaoui

Yugoslavia

- Mirsad Baljić
- Jurica Jerković

=== Player records ===
Players in bold are still part of the club.

Most appearances (Swiss League since 1955)
| # | Nat. | Player | Apps |
|---|---|---|---|
| 1 | (Switzerland) | Karl Grob | 513 |
| 2 | (Switzerland) | Jakob Kuhn | 398 |
| 3 | (Switzerland) | Rudolf Landolt | 353 |
| 4 | (Italy) | Rosario Martinelli | 344 |
| 5 | (Switzerland) | Werner Leimgruber | 314 |
| 6 | (Switzerland) | Urs Fischer | 303 |
| 7 | (Switzerland) | Marco Schönbächler | 292 |
| 8 | (Switzerland) | Alain Nef | 277 |
| 9 | (Switzerland) | Pirmin Stierli | 248 |
| 10 | (Switzerland) | Heinz Lüdi | 244 |

Top scorers (Swiss League since 1955)
| # | Nat. | Player | Goals |
|---|---|---|---|
| 1 | (Switzerland) | Fritz Künzli | 158 |
| 2 | (Italy) | Rosario Martinelli | 126 |
| 3 | (Switzerland) | Jakob Kuhn | 79 |
| 4 | (Switzerland) | Peter Risi | 76 |
| 5 | (Switzerland) | Bruno Brizzi | 74 |
| 5 | (Switzerland) | Werner Leimgruber | 74 |
| 7 | (Switzerland) | Walter Seiler | 62 |
| 8 | (Turkey) | Ercument Sahin | 60 |
| 9 | (Guinea) | Alhassane Keita | 58 |
| 9 | (Germany) | Klaus Stürmer | 58 |

== Managers ==
- (Hungary) József "Csiby" Winkler (1920–22)
- (Austria) Johann Studnicka (1922–25)
- (Switzerland) Severino Minelli (1943–46)
- (Switzerland) Willy Iseli (1946–48)
- (Switzerland) Theodor Lohrmann (1948–53)
- (Switzerland) Joksch Fridl (1953–55)
- (Switzerland) Ossi Müller (1955–57)
- (Switzerland) Fernando Molina and (Switzerland) Max Barras (1957–58)
- (Austria) Karl Rappan (1958–59)
- (Switzerland) Max Barras (1959–60)
- (Germany) Georg Wurzer (1960–62)
- (Switzerland) Louis Maurer (1962–66)
- (Hungary) László Kubala (July 1966 – Feb 67)
- (Switzerland) René Brodmann (Feb 1967 – July 67)
- (Socialist Federal Republic of Yugoslavia) Lev Mantula (1967–69)
- (Germany) Georg Gawliczek (1 July 1969 – 31 December 1970)
- (Hungary) Juan Schwanner (November 1970 – July 71)
- (Germany) Friedhelm Konietzka (1971–78)
- (Socialist Federal Republic of Yugoslavia) Zlatko Čajkovski (July 1978 – March 80)
- (Switzerland) Albert Sing and (Italy) R. Martinelli (29 Feb 1980 – 30 June 1980)
- (Switzerland) Daniel Jeandupeux (1 July 1980 – March 83)
- (Switzerland) Heini Glättli (March 1983 – April 83)
- (Germany) Max Merkel (April 1983 – May 83)
- (Switzerland) Köbi Kuhn (May 1983 – July 83)
- (Germany) Hans Kodric (July 1983 – November 83)
- (Switzerland) Köbi Kuhn (November 1983 – July 84)
- (Czech Republic) Vaclav Jezek (1984–86)
- (Austria) Hermann Stessl (1 July 1986 – 1 November 1987)
- (Germany) Friedhelm Konietzka (Sept 1987 – July 88)
- (Germany) Hannes Bongartz (1 July 1988 – 30 June 1989)
- (Switzerland) Walter Iselin (July 1989 – October 89)
- (Germany) Herbert Neumann (October 1989 –1 October 1991)
- (Austria) Kurt Jara (1 October 1991 – 1 April 1994)
- (England) Bob Houghton (April 1994 – March 95)
- (Switzerland) Raimondo Ponte (March 1995 – 16 April 2000)
- (France) Gilbert Gress (16 April 2000 – 30 June 2001)
- (Switzerland) Georges Bregy (1 July 2001 – 27 March 2003)
- (Switzerland) Walter Grüter (interim) (27 March 2003 – 30 June 2003)
- (Switzerland) Lucien Favre (1 July 2003 – 30 June 2007)
- (Switzerland) Bernard Challandes (1 July 2007 – 19 April 2010)
- (Switzerland) Urs Fischer (interim) (19 April 2010 – 30 June 2010)
- (Switzerland) Urs Fischer (1 July 2010 – 12 March 2012)
- (Switzerland) Harald Gämperle (interim) (13 March 2012 – 8 June 2012)
- (Switzerland) Urs Meier (interim) (14 April 2012 – 24 May 2012)
- (Austria) Rolf Fringer (1 July 2012 – 26 November 2012)
- (Switzerland) Urs Meier (interim) (26 November 2012 – 30 December 2012)
- (Switzerland) Urs Meier (1 Jan 2013 – 3 August 2015)
- (Switzerland) Massimo Rizzo (interim) (3 August 2015 – 31 August 2015)
- (Finland) Sami Hyypiä (31 August 2015 – 12 May 2016)
- (Switzerland) Uli Forte (13 May 2016 – 20 February 2018)
- (Switzerland) Ludovic Magnin (20 February 2018 – 5 October 2020)
- (Switzerland) Massimo Rizzo (interim) (5 October 2020 – 23 December 2020)
- (Switzerland) Massimo Rizzo (24 December 2020 – 30 June 2021)
- (Germany) André Breitenreiter (1 July 2021 – 24 May 2022)
- (Germany) Franco Foda (9 June 2022 – 21 September 2022)
- (Switzerland) Genesio Colatrella (interim) (22 September 2022 – 10 October 2022)
- (Denmark) Bo Henriksen (11 October 2022 – 13 February 2024)
- (Switzerland) Murat Ural and (Switzerland) Umberto Romano (interim co-trainers) (13 February 2024 – 22 April 2024)
- (Netherlands) Ricardo Moniz (22 April 2024 – 27 May 2025)
- (Netherlands) Mitchell van der Gaag (27 May 2025 – present)

== FC Zürich in European football ==
As of 18 August 2022.

| Competition | Pld | W | D | L | GF | GA |
|---|---|---|---|---|---|---|
| European Cup/UEFA Champions League | 47 | 17 | 5 | 25 | 59 | 83 |
| UEFA Cup/UEFA Europa League | 83 | 28 | 18 | 37 | 101 | 130 |
| UEFA Cup Winners' Cup | 12 | 4 | 4 | 4 | 24 | 16 |
| Inter-Cities Fairs Cup | 10 | 4 | 0 | 6 | 12 | 12 |
| Total | 153 | 52 | 27 | 74 | 189 | 236 |

| Season | Competition | Round | Opponent | Home | Away | Aggregate |
|---|---|---|---|---|---|---|
| 1963–64 | European Cup | PR | (Republic of Ireland) Dundalk | 1–2 | 3–0 | 4–2 |
| 1963–64 | European Cup | 1R | (Turkey) Galatasaray | 2–0 | 0–2 | 2–2 |
| 1963–64 | European Cup | QF | (Netherlands) PSV Eindhoven | 3–1 | 0–1 | 3–2 |
| 1963–64 | European Cup | SF | (Spain) Real Madrid | 1–2 | 0–6 | 1–8 |
| 1966–67 | European Cup | 1R | (Scotland) Celtic | 0–3 | 0–2 | 0–5 |
| 1967–68 | Inter-Cities Fairs Cup | 1R | (Spain) Barcelona | 3–1 | 0–1 | 3–2 |
| 1967–68 | Inter-Cities Fairs Cup | 2R | (England) Nottingham Forest | 1–0 | 1–2 | 2–2(a) |
| 1967–68 | Inter-Cities Fairs Cup | 3R | (Portugal) Sporting CP | 3–0 | 0–1 | 3–1 |
| 1967–68 | Inter-Cities Fairs Cup | QF | (Scotland) Dundee | 0–1 | 0–1 | 0–2 |
| 1968–69 | European Cup | 1R | (Denmark) AB | 1–3 | 1–2 | 2–5 |
| 1969–70 | Inter-Cities Fairs Cup | 1R | (Scotland) Kilmarnock | 3–2 | 1–3 | 4–5 |
| 1970–71 | European Cup Winners' Cup | 1R | (Iceland) Knattspyrnufélag Akureyrar | 7–0 | 7–1 | 14–1 |
| 1970–71 | European Cup Winners' Cup | 2R | (Belgium) Club Brugge | 3–2 | 0–2 | 3–4 |
| 1972–73 | European Cup Winners' Cup | 1R | (Wales) Wrexham | 1–1 | 1–2 | 2–3 |
| 1973–74 | European Cup Winners' Cup | 1R | (Belgium) Anderlecht | 1–0 | 2–3 | 3–3(a) |
| 1973–74 | European Cup Winners' Cup | 2R | (Sweden) Malmö | 0–0 | 1–1 | 1–1(a) |
| 1973–74 | European Cup Winners' Cup | QF | (Portugal) Sporting CP | 1–1 | 0–3 | 1–4 |
| 1974–75 | European Cup | 1R | (England) Leeds United | 2–1 | 1–4 | 3–5 |
| 1975–76 | European Cup | 1R | (Hungary) Újpest | 5–1 | 0–4 | 5–5(a) |
| 1976–77 | European Cup | 1R | (Scotland) Rangers | 1–0 | 1–1 | 2–1 |
| 1976–77 | European Cup | 2R | (Finland) Turun Palloseura | 2–0 | 1–0 | 3–0 |
| 1976–77 | European Cup | QF | (East Germany) Dynamo Dresden | 2–1 | 2–3 | 4–4(a) |
| 1976–77 | European Cup | SF | (England) Liverpool | 1–3 | 0–3 | 1–6 |
| 1977–78 | UEFA Cup | 1R | (Bulgaria) CSKA Sofia | 1–0 | 1–1 | 2–1 |
| 1977–78 | UEFA Cup | 2R | (Germany) Eintracht Frankfurt | 3–4 | 0–3 | 3–7 |
| 1979–80 | UEFA Cup | 1R | (Germany) Kaiserslautern | 1–3 | 1–5 | 2–8 |
| 1981–82 | European Cup | 1R | (East Germany) Dynamo Berlin | 3–1 | 0–2 | 3–3(a) |
| 1982–83 | UEFA Cup | 1R | (Cyprus) Pezoporikos Larnaca | 1–0 | 2–2 | 3–2 |
| 1982–83 | UEFA Cup | 2R | (Hungary) Ferencváros | 1–0 | 1–1 | 2–1 |
| 1982–83 | UEFA Cup | 3R | (Portugal) Benfica | 1–1 | 0–4 | 1–5 |
| 1983–84 | UEFA Cup | 1R | (Belgium) Antwerp | 2–4 | 1–4 | 3–8 |
| 1998–99 | UEFA Cup | 2QR | (Ukraine) Shakhtar Donetsk | 4–0 | 2–3 | 6–3 |
| 1998–99 | UEFA Cup | 1R | (Cyprus) Anorthosis Famagusta | 4–0 | 3–2 | 7–2 |
| 1998–99 | UEFA Cup | 2R | (Scotland) Celtic | 4–2 | 1–1 | 5–3 |
| 1998–99 | UEFA Cup | 3R | (Italy) Roma | 2–2 | 0–1 | 2–3 |
| 1999–00 | UEFA Cup | QR | (Malta) Sliema Wanderers | 1–0 | 3–0 | 4–0 |
| 1999–00 | UEFA Cup | 1R | (Belgium) Lierse | 4–3 | 1–0 | 5–3 |
| 1999–00 | UEFA Cup | 2R | (England) Newcastle United | 1–2 | 1–3 | 2–5 |
| 2000–01 | UEFA Cup | 1R | (Belgium) Genk | 1–2 | 0–2 | 1–4 |
| 2005–06 | UEFA Cup | 2QR | (Poland) Legia Warsaw | 4–1 | 1–0 | 5–1 |
| 2005–06 | UEFA Cup | 1R | (Denmark) Brøndby | 2–1 | 0–2 | 2–3 |
| 2006–07 | UEFA Champions League | 2QR | (Austria) Red Bull Salzburg | 2–1 | 0–2 | 2–3 |
| 2007–08 | UEFA Champions League | 3QR | (Turkey) Beşiktaş | 1–1 | 0–2 | 1–3 |
| 2007–08 | UEFA Cup | 1R | (Italy) Empoli | 3–0 | 1–2 | 4–2 |
| 2007–08 | UEFA Cup | Group E | (Czech Republic) Sparta Prague | —N/a | 2–1 | 3rd |
| 2007–08 | UEFA Cup | Group E | (France) Toulouse | 2–0 | —N/a | 3rd |
| 2007–08 | UEFA Cup | Group E | (Russia) Spartak Moscow | —N/a | 0–1 | 3rd |
| 2007–08 | UEFA Cup | Group E | (Germany) Bayer Leverkusen | 0–5 | —N/a | 3rd |
| 2007–08 | UEFA Cup | R32 | (Germany) Hamburger SV | 1–3 | 0–0 | 1–3 |
| 2008–09 | UEFA Cup | 2QR | (Austria) Sturm Graz | 1–1 | 1–1 (a.e.t.) | 2–2 (4–2 p) |
| 2008–09 | UEFA Cup | 1R | (Italy) Milan | 0–1 | 1–3 | 1–4 |
| 2009–10 | UEFA Champions League | 3QR | (Slovenia) Maribor | 2–3 | 3–0 | 5–3 |
| 2009–10 | UEFA Champions League | PO | (Latvia) Ventspils | 2–1 | 3–0 | 5–1 |
| 2009–10 | UEFA Champions League | Group C | (Spain) Real Madrid | 2–5 | 0–1 | 4th |
| 2009–10 | UEFA Champions League | Group C | (Italy) Milan | 1–1 | 1–0 | 4th |
| 2009–10 | UEFA Champions League | Group C | (France) Marseille | 0–1 | 1–6 | 4th |
| 2011–12 | UEFA Champions League | 3QR | (Belgium) Standard Liège | 1–0 | 1–1 | 2–1 |
| 2011–12 | UEFA Champions League | PO | (Germany) Bayern Munich | 0–1 | 0–2 | 0–3 |
| 2011–12 | UEFA Champions League | Group D | (Portugal) Sporting CP | 0–2 | 0–2 | 4th |
| 2011–12 | UEFA Champions League | Group D | (Romania) Vaslui | 2–0 | 2–2 | 4th |
| 2011–12 | UEFA Champions League | Group D | (Italy) Lazio | 1–1 | 0–1 | 4th |
| 2013–14 | UEFA Europa League | 3QR | (Czech Republic) Slovan Liberec | 1–2 | 1–2 | 2–4 |
| 2014–15 | UEFA Europa League | PO | (Slovakia) Spartak Trnava | 1–1 | 3–1 | 4–2 |
| 2014–15 | UEFA Europa League | Group A | (Cyprus) Apollon Limassol | 3–1 | 2–3 | 3rd |
| 2014–15 | UEFA Europa League | Group A | (Germany) Borussia Mönchengladbach | 1–1 | 0–3 | 3rd |
| 2014–15 | UEFA Europa League | Group A | (Spain) Villarreal | 3–2 | 1–4 | 3rd |
| 2015–16 | UEFA Europa League | 3QR | (Belarus) Dinamo Minsk | 0–1 | 1–1 | 1–2 |
| 2016–17 | UEFA Europa League | Group L | (Spain) Villarreal | 1–1 | 1–2 | 3rd |
| 2016–17 | UEFA Europa League | Group L | (Romania) FCSB | 0–0 | 1–1 | 3rd |
| 2016–17 | UEFA Europa League | Group L | (Turkey) Osmanlıspor | 2–1 | 0–2 | 3rd |
| 2018–19 | UEFA Europa League | Group A | (Germany) Bayer Leverkusen | 3–2 | 0–1 | 2nd |
| 2018–19 | UEFA Europa League | Group A | (Bulgaria) Ludogorets Razgrad | 1–0 | 1–1 | 2nd |
| 2018–19 | UEFA Europa League | Group A | (Cyprus) AEK Larnaca | 1–2 | 1–0 | 2nd |
| 2018–19 | UEFA Europa League | R32 | (Italy) Napoli | 1–3 | 0–2 | 1–5 |
| 2022–23 | UEFA Champions League | 2QR | (Azerbaijan) Qarabağ | 2–2 (a.e.t.) | 2–3 | 4−5 |
| 2022–23 | UEFA Europa League | 3QR | (Northern Ireland) Linfield | 3–0 | 2–0 | 5–0 |
| 2022–23 | UEFA Europa League | PO | (Scotland) Heart of Midlothian | 2–1 | 1–0 | 3–1 |
| 2022–23 | UEFA Europa League | Group A | (England) Arsenal | 1–2 | 0–1 | 4th |
| 2022–23 | UEFA Europa League | Group A | (Norway) Bodø/Glimt | 2–1 | 1–2 | 4th |
| 2022–23 | UEFA Europa League | Group A | (Netherlands) PSV Eindhoven | 1–5 | 0–5 | 4th |
| 2024–25 | UEFA Conference League | 2QR | (Republic of Ireland) Shelbourne | 3–0 | 0–0 | 3–0 |
| 2024–25 | UEFA Conference League | 3QR | (Portugal) Vitória de Guimarães | 0–3 | 0–2 | 0–5 |
