= 1987–88 Swiss 1. Liga =

1. Liga
- Season: 1987–88
- Champions: Overall champions FC Emmenbrücke; Group 1: Urania Genève Sport; Group 2: SV Lyss; Group 3: FC Emmenbrücke; Group 4: FC Glarus
- Promoted: FC Emmenbrücke; Urania Genève Sport; FC Glarus
- Relegated: Group 1: FC Leytron; FC Vernier; Group 2: FC Dürrenast; SC Baudepartement Basel; Group 3: FC Sursee; SC Goldau; Group 4: FC Dübendorf; FC Küsnacht; FC Embrach
- Matches: 4 times 182 and 4 deciders plus 14 play-offs and 4 play-outs

The 1987–88 Swiss 1. Liga was the 56th season of this league since its creation in 1931. At this time, the 1. Liga was the third tier of the Swiss football league system and it was the highest level of amateur football.

== Format ==
There were 56 clubs in the 1. Liga, divided into four regional groups, each with 14 teams. Within each group, the teams would play a double round-robin to decide their league position. Two points were awarded for a win. The four group winners and the four runners-up then contested a play-off for the three promotion slots. The two last placed teams in each group were directly relegated to the 2. Liga (fourth tier). The four third-last placed teams would compete a play-out against the ninth relegation spot.

== Group 1 ==
=== Teams ===
| Club | Canton | Stadium | Capacity |
|---|---|---|---|
| FC Aigle | Vaud | Les Glariers | 1,000 |
| FC Boudry | Neuchâtel | Stade des Buchilles | 1,500 |
| FC Châtel-Saint-Denis | Fribourg | Stade du Lussy - Châtel-St-Denis | 1,000 |
| Concordia/Folgore Lausanne | Vaud | Centre Sportif de la Tuilière | 1,000 |
| FC Colombier | Neuchâtel | Stade des Chézards | 2,500 |
| FC Echallens | Vaud | Sportplatz 3 Sapins | 2,000 |
| Grand-Lancy FC | Geneva | Stade de Marignac | 1,500 |
| FC Leytron | Valais | Stade Saint-Martin | 1,000 |
| FC Le Locle | Neuchâtel | Installation sportive - Jeanneret | 3,142 |
| FC Monthey | Valais | Stade Philippe Pottier | 1,800 |
| FC Raron | Valais | Sportplatz Rhoneglut | 1,000 |
| FC Stade Lausanne | Vaud | Centre sportif de Vidy | 1,000 |
| Urania Genève Sport | Geneva | Stade de Frontenex | 4,000 |
| FC Vernier | Geneva | Stade municipal de Vernier | 1,000 |

=== Final league table ===
| Pos | Team | Pld | W | D | L | GF | GA | GD | Pts | Qualification or relegation |
|---|---|---|---|---|---|---|---|---|---|---|
| 1 | Urania Genève Sport | 26 | 17 | 4 | 5 | 60 | 32 | +28 | 38 | Play-off to Nationalliga B |
| 2 | FC Châtel-Saint-Denis | 28 | 15 | 8 | 5 | 52 | 32 | +20 | 38 | Play-off to Nationalliga B |
| 3 | FC Raron | 26 | 11 | 10 | 5 | 34 | 26 | +8 | 32 | |
| 4 | FC Echallens | 26 | 12 | 5 | 9 | 50 | 39 | +11 | 29 | |
| 5 | FC Le Locle | 26 | 10 | 7 | 9 | 35 | 37 | −2 | 27 | |
| 6 | FC Stade Lausanne | 26 | 9 | 9 | 8 | 25 | 28 | −3 | 27 | |
| 7 | FC Aigle | 26 | 8 | 9 | 9 | 35 | 34 | +1 | 25 | |
| 8 | Concordia/Folgore Lausanne | 19 | 9 | 0 | 10 | 29 | 29 | 0 | 18 | |
| 9 | FC Colombier | 26 | 9 | 6 | 11 | 36 | 37 | −1 | 24 | |
| 10 | FC Monthey | 26 | 6 | 11 | 9 | 35 | 37 | −2 | 23 | |
| 11 | Grand-Lancy FC | 26 | 7 | 9 | 10 | 30 | 32 | −2 | 23 | |
| 12 | FC Boudry | 26 | 8 | 7 | 11 | 34 | 50 | −16 | 23 | Play-out against relegation |
| 13 | FC Leytron | 26 | 7 | 4 | 15 | 29 | 47 | −18 | 18 | Relegation to 2. Liga Interregional |
| 14 | FC Vernier | 25 | 4 | 5 | 16 | 33 | 57 | −24 | 13 | Relegation to 2. Liga Interregional |

Source: RSSSF
Rules for classification: 1) Points; 2) Goal difference within the league, but decider play-off for qualifiers.

== Group 2 ==
=== Teams ===
| Club | Canton | Stadium | Capacity |
|---|---|---|---|
| FC Bern | Bern | Stadion Neufeld | 14,000 |
| SC Baudepartement Basel | Basel-Stadt | Rankhof | 7,600 |
| FC Breitenbach | Solothurn | Grien | 2,000 |
| SC Burgdorf | canton of Bern | Stadion Neumatt | 3,850 |
| FC Central Fribourg | Fribourg | Guintzet | 2,000 |
| SR Delémont | Jura | La Blancherie | 5,263 |
| FC Dürrenast | Bern | Stadion Lachen | 13,500 |
| FC Fribourg | Fribourg | Stade Universitaire | 9,000 |
| FC Köniz | Bern | Sportplatz Liebefeld-Hessgut | 2,600 |
| FC Laufen | Basel-Country | Sportplatz Nau | 3,000 |
| SV Lyss | Bern | Sportzentrum Grien | 2,000 |
| FC Moutier | Bern | Stade de Chalière | 5,000 |
| FC Rapid Ostermundigen | Bern | Oberfeld | 1,000 |
| FC Thun | Bern | Stadion Lachen | 10,350 |

=== Final league table ===
| Pos | Team | Pld | W | D | L | GF | GA | GD | Pts | Qualification or relegation |
|---|---|---|---|---|---|---|---|---|---|---|
| 1 | SV Lyss | 26 | 13 | 10 | 3 | 43 | 20 | +23 | 36 | Play-off to Nationalliga B |
| 2 | FC Thun | 26 | 14 | 7 | 5 | 68 | 36 | +32 | 35 | Play-off to Nationalliga B |
| 3 | FC Laufen | 26 | 7 | 16 | 3 | 37 | 27 | +10 | 30 | |
| 4 | SC Burgdorf | 26 | 10 | 7 | 9 | 47 | 44 | +3 | 27 | |
| 5 | FC Rapid Ostermundigen | 26 | 8 | 11 | 7 | 43 | 49 | −6 | 27 | |
| 6 | FC Bern | 26 | 9 | 8 | 9 | 36 | 37 | −1 | 26 | |
| 7 | Central Fribourg | 26 | 7 | 11 | 8 | 36 | 55 | −19 | 25 | |
| 8 | FC Breitenbach | 26 | 11 | 2 | 13 | 50 | 39 | +11 | 24 | |
| 9 | FC Moutier | 26 | 8 | 8 | 10 | 48 | 47 | +1 | 24 | |
| 10 | SR Delémont | 26 | 8 | 7 | 11 | 57 | 65 | −8 | 23 | |
| 11 | FC Fribourg | 26 | 8 | 7 | 11 | 47 | 49 | −2 | 23 | |
| 12 | FC Dürrenast | 26 | 6 | 10 | 10 | 37 | 46 | −9 | 22 | Decider for twelfth place |
| 13 | FC Köniz | 26 | 8 | 6 | 12 | 34 | 50 | −16 | 22 | Decider for twelfth place |
| 14 | SC Baudepartement Basel | 26 | 6 | 8 | 12 | 37 | 49 | −12 | 20 | Relegation to 2. Liga Interregional |

Source: RSSSF
Rules for classification: 1) Points; 2) Goal difference within the league, but decider play-off for qualifiers.

=== Decider for twelfth position ===
The play-out match for twelfth position was played on 24 May 1988 in Stadion Neumatt in Burgdorf.

| Team 1 | Score | Team 2 |
|---|---|---|
| FC Dürrenast | 0–1 | FC Köniz |

FC Köniz win and continued in the play-outs. FC Dürrenast are directly relegated to 2. Liga Interregional.

== Group 3 ==
=== Teams ===
| Club | Canton | Stadium | Capacity |
|---|---|---|---|
| FC Altdorf | Uri | Gemeindesportplatz | 4,000 |
| FC Ascona | Ticino | Stadio Comunale Ascona | 1,400 |
| SC Buochs | Nidwalden | Stadion Seefeld | 5,000 |
| FC Einsiedeln | Schwyz | Rappenmöösli | 1,300 |
| FC Emmenbrücke | Lucerne | Stadion Gersag | 8,700 |
| SC Goldau | Schwyz | Sportplatz Tierpark | 1,250 |
| FC Klus-Balsthal | Solothurn | Sportplatz Moos | 4,000 |
| SC Kriens | Lucerne | Stadion Kleinfeld | 5,100 |
| FC Mendrisio | Ticino | Centro Sportivo Comunale | 4,000 |
| FC Muri | Aargau | Stadion Brühl | 2,350 |
| FC Sursee | Lucerne | Stadion Schlottermilch | 3,500 |
| FC Suhr | Aargau | Hofstattmatten | 2,000 |
| FC Tresa/Monteggio | Ticino | Cornaredo Stadium | 6,330 |
| FC Zug | Zug | Herti Allmend Stadion | 6,000 |

=== Final league table ===
| Pos | Team | Pld | W | D | L | GF | GA | GD | Pts | Qualification or relegation |
|---|---|---|---|---|---|---|---|---|---|---|
| 1 | FC Emmenbrücke | 26 | 14 | 8 | 4 | 54 | 18 | +36 | 36 | Play-off to Nationalliga B |
| 2 | SC Buochs | 26 | 13 | 10 | 3 | 52 | 29 | +23 | 36 | To decider for second place |
| 3 | FC Suhr | 26 | 14 | 8 | 4 | 41 | 23 | +18 | 36 | To decider for second place |
| 4 | SC Kriens | 26 | 13 | 8 | 5 | 47 | 26 | +21 | 34 | |
| 5 | FC Einsiedeln | 26 | 11 | 7 | 8 | 57 | 48 | +9 | 29 | |
| 6 | FC Zug | 26 | 11 | 6 | 9 | 39 | 32 | +7 | 28 | |
| 7 | FC Ascona | 26 | 10 | 7 | 9 | 34 | 39 | −5 | 27 | |
| 8 | FC Muri | 26 | 8 | 9 | 9 | 33 | 33 | 0 | 25 | |
| 9 | FC Klus-Balsthal | 26 | 9 | 7 | 10 | 32 | 40 | −8 | 25 | |
| 10 | FC Mendrisio | 26 | 7 | 10 | 9 | 32 | 32 | 0 | 24 | |
| 11 | FC Tresa/Monteggio | 26 | 7 | 7 | 12 | 30 | 39 | −9 | 21 | |
| 12 | FC Altdorf (Uri) | 26 | 6 | 8 | 12 | 32 | 52 | −20 | 20 | Play-out against relegation |
| 13 | FC Sursee | 26 | 5 | 5 | 16 | 41 | 64 | −23 | 15 | Relegation to 2. Liga Interregional |
| 14 | SC Goldau | 26 | 3 | 2 | 21 | 25 | 74 | −49 | 8 | Relegation to 2. Liga Interregional |

Source: RSSSF
Rules for classification: 1) Points; 2) Goal difference within the league, but decider play-off for qualifiers.

=== Decider for second position ===
| Team 1 | Score | Team 2 |
|---|---|---|
| FC Suhr | 1–2 | SC Buochs |

SC Buochs win and advance to play-offs.

== Group 4 ==
=== Teams ===
| Club | Canton | Stadium | Capacity |
|---|---|---|---|
| FC Altstätten (St. Gallen) | St. Gallen | Grüntal Altstätten | 1,000 |
| FC Brüttisellen | Zürich | Lindenbuck | 1,000 |
| FC Dübendorf | Zürich | Zelgli | 1,500 |
| FC Embrach | Zürich | Im Bilg | 1,800 |
| FC Frauenfeld | Thurgau | Kleine Allmend | 6,370 |
| FC Glarus | Glarus | Buchholz | 800 |
| FC Herisau | Appenzell Ausserrhoden | Ebnet | 2,000 |
| FC Kilchberg | Zürich | Hochweid | 1,000 |
| FC Küsnacht | Zürich | Sportanlage Heslibach | 2,300 |
| FC Red Star Zürich | Zürich | Allmend Brunau | 2,000 |
| FC Rorschach | Schwyz | Sportplatz Kellen | 1,000 |
| FC Stäfa | Zürich | Sportanlage Frohberg | 1,500 |
| FC Tuggen | Schwyz | Linthstrasse | 2,800 |
| FC Vaduz | Liechtenstein | Rheinpark Stadion | 7,584 |

=== Final league table ===
| Pos | Team | Pld | W | D | L | GF | GA | GD | Pts | Qualification or relegation |
|---|---|---|---|---|---|---|---|---|---|---|
| 1 | FC Glarus | 26 | 13 | 11 | 2 | 32 | 12 | +20 | 37 | Play-off to Nationalliga B |
| 2 | FC Herisau | 26 | 11 | 9 | 6 | 35 | 30 | +5 | 31 | To decider for second place |
| 3 | FC Rorschach | 26 | 12 | 7 | 7 | 30 | 28 | +2 | 31 | To decider for second place |
| 4 | FC Vaduz | 26 | 12 | 6 | 8 | 47 | 26 | +21 | 30 | |
| 5 | FC Kilchberg | 26 | 11 | 7 | 8 | 35 | 35 | 0 | 29 | |
| 6 | FC Altstätten (St. Gallen) | 26 | 10 | 8 | 8 | 43 | 34 | +9 | 28 | |
| 7 | FC Red Star Zürich | 26 | 9 | 9 | 8 | 30 | 29 | +1 | 27 | |
| 8 | FC Tuggen | 26 | 9 | 8 | 9 | 41 | 33 | +8 | 26 | |
| 9 | FC Brüttisellen | 26 | 8 | 9 | 9 | 38 | 34 | +4 | 25 | |
| 10 | FC Frauenfeld | 26 | 9 | 6 | 11 | 28 | 42 | −14 | 24 | |
| 11 | FC Stäfa | 26 | 7 | 8 | 11 | 36 | 49 | −13 | 22 | |
| 12 | FC Küsnacht | 26 | 4 | 12 | 10 | 24 | 28 | −4 | 20 | Decider for twelfth place |
| 13 | FC Dübendorf | 26 | 7 | 6 | 13 | 29 | 41 | −12 | 20 | Decider for twelfth place |
| 14 | FC Embrach | 26 | 2 | 10 | 14 | 14 | 41 | −27 | 14 | Relegation to 2. Liga Interregional |

Source: RSSSF
Rules for classification: 1) Points; 2) Goal difference within the league, but decider play-off for qualifiers.

=== Decider for second place ===
The decider was played on 24 May 1988 in St. Gallen

| Team 1 | Score | Team 2 |
|---|---|---|
| FC Rorschach | 2–2 | FC Herisau |

FC Rorschach win and advance to play-offs.

=== Decider for twelfth place ===
The decider was played on 24 May 1988 in Kilchberg

| Team 1 | Score | Team 2 |
|---|---|---|
| FC Dübendorf | 3–2 | FC Küsnacht |

FC Dübendorf win and continued in the play-outs. FC Küsnacht are relegated directly to 2. Liga Interregional.

== Promotion play-off ==
=== Qualification round ===
| Team 1 | Score | Team 2 |
|---|---|---|
| FC Thun | 4–4 | FC Emmenbrücke |
| FC Emmenbrücke | 4–1 | FC Thun |

FC Emmenbrücke win 8–5 on aggregate and continue to the finals.

| Team 1 | Score | Team 2 |
|---|---|---|
| Châtel-Saint-Denis | 1–1 | Glarus |
| Glarus | 3–0 | Châtel-Saint-Denis |

Glarus win 4–1 on aggregate and continue to the finals.

| Team 1 | Score | Team 2 |
|---|---|---|
| Urania Genève Sport | 5–1 | SC Buochs |
| SC Buochs | 1–1 | Urania Genève Sport |

Urania Genève Sport win 6–2 on aggregate and continue to the finals.

| Team 1 | Score | Team 2 |
|---|---|---|
| FC Rorschach | 2–0 | SV Lyss |
| SV Lyss | 2–1 | FC Rorschach |

FC Rorschach win 3–2 on aggregate and continue to the finals.

=== Final round ===
| Team 1 | Score | Team 2 |
|---|---|---|
| Urania Genève Sport | 0–0 | Glarus |
| Glarus | 1–2 | Urania Genève Sport |

Urania Genève Sport win 2–1 on aggregate and are promoted to 1988–89 Nationalliga B.

| Team 1 | Score | Team 2 |
|---|---|---|
| FC Emmenbrücke | 1–0 | FC Rorschach |
| FC Rorschach | 2–1 | FC Emmenbrücke |

FC Emmenbrücke win on away goals and are promoted to 1988–89 Nationalliga B.

=== Decider for third place ===
The play-offs for the third promotion place was played on 25 June and on 2 July.

| Team 1 | Score | Team 2 |
|---|---|---|
| Glarus | 3–1 | FC Rorschach |
| FC Rorschach | 1–5 | Glarus |

Glarus win 8–2 on aggregate and are promoted to 1988–89 Nationalliga B.

=== Decider for championship ===
The play-off for the championship should have taken place on 25 June.

| Team 1 | Score | Team 2 |
|---|---|---|
| FC Emmenbrücke | not played | Urania Genève Sport |

Urania Genève Sport rejected the offer to play a championship final, thus FC Emmenbrücke were declared as 1. Liga champions for the 1987–88 season.

== Relegation play-out ==
=== First round ===
| Team 1 | Score | Team 2 |
|---|---|---|
| FC Altdorf | 3–1 | FC Dübendorf |

continue to the final.

| Team 1 | Score | Team 2 |
|---|---|---|
| FC Boudry | 4–1 | FC Köniz |

continue to the final.

=== Final round ===
| Team 1 | Score | Team 2 |
|---|---|---|
| FC Köniz | 2–0 | FC Dübendorf |
| FC Dübendorf | 1–2 | FC Köniz |

FC Köniz win 4–1 on aggregate. FC Dübendorf are relegated to 2. Liga.

== Further in Swiss football ==
- 1987–88 Nationalliga A
- 1987–88 Nationalliga B
- 1987–88 Swiss Cup

== Sources ==
- Switzerland 1987–88 at RSSSF

| Preceded by 1986–87 | Seasons in Swiss 1. Liga | Succeeded by 1988–89 |
