= 1986–87 Swiss 1. Liga =

1. Liga
- Season: 1986–87
- Champions: Group 1: FC Montreux-Sports; Group 2: BSC Old Boys; Group 3: FC Solothurn; Group 4: FC Altstätten
- Promoted: FC Montreux-Sports; Yverdon-Sport FC; FC Solothurn; FC Chur; BSC Old Boys
- Relegated: Group 1: FC Saint-Jean GE; FC Savièse; Group 2: FC Lengnau; FC Nordstern Basel; Group 3: FC Ibach; FC Langenthal; Group 4: FC Gossau; FC Rüti
- Matches: 4 times 182 and 1 decider plus 16 play-offs

The 1986–87 Swiss 1. Liga was the 55th season of this league since its creation in 1931. At this time, the 1. Liga was the third tier of the Swiss football league system and it was the highest level of amateur football.

== Format ==
There were 56 clubs in the 1. Liga, divided into four regional groups, each with 14 teams. Within each group, the teams would play a double round-robin to decide their league position. Two points were awarded for a win. Due to a modification in the Nationalliga B (second tier), an increase in the number of teams in the following season, there were to be four direct promotions from the 1. Liga. In the first stage of the play-offs, the four group winners contested a play-off final against one of the four runners-up for the four direct promotion slots. Then in the second stage, the four defeated teams would contest a play-off final against the four last placed teams from the Nationalliga B to decide the last four places in the second tier in the next year. At the other end of the league table the situation was much clearer, the two last placed teams in each group were directly relegated to the 2. Liga (fourth tier).

== Group 1 ==
=== Teams ===
Club	Canton	Stadium	Capacity
FC Aigle	Vaud	Les Glariers	1,000
FC Châtel-Saint-Denis	Fribourg	Stade du Lussy - Châtel-St-Denis	1,000
FC Echallens	Vaud	Sportplatz 3 Sapins	2,000
Folgore Lausanne	Vaud	Centre Sportif de la Tuilière	1,000
FC Fribourg	Fribourg	Stade Universitaire	9,000
Grand-Lancy FC	Geneva	Stade de Marignac	1,500
FC Leytron	Valais	Stade Saint-Martin	1,000
FC Monthey	Valais	Stade Philippe Pottier	1,800
FC Montreux-Sports	Vaud	Stade de Chailly	1,000
FC Saint-Jean GE	Geneva	Centre sportif de Varembé	3,000
FC Savièse	Valais	Stade St-Germain	2,000
FC Stade Lausanne	Vaud	Centre sportif de Vidy	1,000
FC Vernier	Geneva	Stade municipal de Vernier	1,000
Yverdon-Sport FC	Vaud	Stade Municipal	6,600

=== Final league table ===
Pos	Team	Pld	W	D	L	GF	GA	GD	Pts	Qualification or relegation
1	FC Montreux-Sports	26	15	6	5	59	33	+26	36	Play-off to Nationalliga B
2	Yverdon-Sport FC	26	16	4	6	56	37	+19	36	Play-off to Nationalliga B
3	FC Fribourg	26	12	9	5	61	28	+33	33	
4	FC Echallens	26	12	8	6	47	33	+14	32	
5	FC Monthey	26	14	1	11	53	50	+3	29	
6	Grand-Lancy FC	26	12	2	12	49	47	+2	26	
7	FC Châtel-Saint-Denis	26	11	4	11	44	46	−2	26	
8	FC Leytron	26	9	8	9	35	46	−11	26	
9	FC Stade Lausanne	26	8	9	9	39	39	0	25	
10	FC Vernier	26	7	7	12	44	47	−3	21	
11	Folgore Lausanne	26	7	7	12	34	54	−20	21	
12	FC Aigle	26	7	5	14	50	60	−10	19	
13	FC Saint-Jean GE	26	7	4	15	32	57	−25	18	Relegation to 2. Liga Interregional
14	FC Savièse	26	5	6	15	34	60	−26	16	Relegation to 2. Liga Interregional

Source: RSSSF
Rules for classification: 1) Points; 2) Goal difference within the league, but decider play-off for qualifiers.

== Group 2 ==
=== Teams ===
Club	Canton	Stadium	Capacity
SC Baudepartement Basel	Basel-Stadt	Rankhof	7,600
FC Bern	Bern	Stadion Neufeld	14,000
FC Breitenbach	Solothurn	Grien	2,000
FC Colombier	Neuchâtel	Stade des Chézards	2,500
SR Delémont	Jura	La Blancherie	5,263
FC Dürrenast	Bern	Stadion Lachen	13,500
FC Köniz	Bern	Sportplatz Liebefeld-Hessgut	2,600
FC Laufen	Basel-Country	Sportplatz Nau	3,000
FC Le Locle	Neuchâtel	Installation sportive - Jeanneret	3,142
FC Lengnau	Bern	Moos Lengnau BE	3,900
FC Moutier	Bern	Stade de Chalière	5,000
FC Nordstern Basel	Basel-Stadt	Rankhof	7,600
BSC Old Boys	Basel-Stadt	Stadion Schützenmatte	8,000
FC Thun	Bern	Stadion Lachen	10,350

=== Final league table ===
Pos	Team	Pld	W	D	L	GF	GA	GD	Pts	Qualification or relegation
1	BSC Old Boys	26	14	11	1	44	18	+26	39	Play-off to Nationalliga B
2	FC Bern	26	12	8	6	40	28	+12	32	Play-off to Nationalliga B
3	FC Thun	26	13	5	8	54	35	+19	31	
4	FC Colombier	26	11	6	9	38	39	−1	28	
5	SR Delémont	26	11	6	9	41	42	−1	28	
6	FC Dürrenast	26	12	3	11	48	45	+3	27	
7	FC Laufen	26	10	6	10	45	36	+9	26	
8	FC Le Locle	26	8	9	9	29	30	−1	25	
9	FC Breitenbach	26	9	6	11	34	38	−4	24	
10	SC Baudepartement Basel	26	8	7	11	33	39	−6	23	
11	FC Moutier	26	5	12	9	32	40	−8	22	
12	FC Köniz	26	6	9	11	35	44	−9	21	
13	FC Lengnau	26	6	8	12	36	60	−24	20	Relegation to 2. Liga Interregional
14	FC Nordstern Basel	26	5	8	13	35	50	−15	18	Relegation to 2. Liga Interregional

Source: RSSSF
Rules for classification: 1) Points; 2) Goal difference within the league, but decider play-off for qualifiers.

== Group 3 ==
=== Teams ===
Club	Canton	Stadium	Capacity
FC Altdorf	Uri	Gemeindesportplatz	4,000
FC Ascona	Ticino	Stadio Comunale Ascona	1,400
SC Burgdorf	canton of Bern	Stadion Neumatt	3,850
SC Buochs	Nidwalden	Stadion Seefeld	5,000
FC Emmenbrücke	Lucerne	Stadion Gersag	8,700
FC Ibach	Schwyz	Gerbihof	3,300
FC Klus-Balsthal	Solothurn	Sportplatz Moos	4,000
FC Langenthal	Bern	Rankmatte	2,000
FC Mendrisio	Ticino	Centro Sportivo Comunale	4,000
FC Muri	Aargau	Stadion Brühl	2,350
FC Solothurn	Solothurn	Stadion FC Solothurn	6,750
FC Suhr	Aargau	Hofstattmatten	2,000
FC Sursee	Lucerne	Stadion Schlottermilch	3,500
FC Zug	Zug	Herti Allmend Stadion	6,000

=== Final league table ===
Pos	Team	Pld	W	D	L	GF	GA	GD	Pts	Qualification or relegation
1	FC Solothurn	26	15	7	4	49	21	+28	37	Play-off to Nationalliga B
2	SC Buochs	26	15	6	5	49	28	+21	36	Play-off to Nationalliga B
3	FC Mendrisio	26	12	11	3	38	22	+16	35	
4	FC Zug	26	7	14	5	31	22	+9	28	
5	SC Burgdorf	26	9	10	7	37	33	+4	28	
6	FC Klus-Balsthal	26	11	6	9	39	37	+2	28	
7	FC Emmenbrücke	26	10	7	9	32	35	−3	27	
8	FC Suhr	26	6	14	6	32	27	+5	26	
9	FC Sursee	26	6	12	8	32	32	0	24	
10	FC Altdorf (Uri)	26	7	8	11	35	43	−8	22	
11	FC Muri	26	4	11	11	29	42	−13	19	
12	FC Ascona	26	6	7	13	23	40	−17	19	
13	FC Ibach	26	5	8	13	29	51	−22	18	Relegation to 2. Liga Interregional
14	FC Langenthal	26	4	9	13	30	52	−22	17	Relegation to 2. Liga Interregional

Source: RSSSF
Rules for classification: 1) Points; 2) Goal difference within the league, but decider play-off for qualifiers.

== Group 4 ==
=== Teams ===
Club	Canton	Stadium	Capacity
FC Altstätten (St. Gallen)	St. Gallen	Grüntal Altstätten	1,000
FC Brüttisellen	Zürich	Lindenbuck	1,000
FC Chur	Grisons	Ringstrasse	2,820
FC Dübendorf	Zürich	Zelgli	1,500
FC Einsiedeln	Schwyz	Rappenmöösli	1,300
FC Gossau	St. Gallen	Sportanlage Buechenwald	3,500
FC Herisau	Appenzell Ausserrhoden	Ebnet	2,000
FC Küsnacht	Zürich	Sportanlage Heslibach	2,300
FC Red Star Zürich	Zürich	Allmend Brunau	2,000
FC Rorschach	Schwyz	Sportplatz Kellen	1,000
FC Rüti	Zürich	Schützenwiese	1,200
FC Stäfa	Zürich	Sportanlage Frohberg	1,500
FC Tuggen	Schwyz	Linthstrasse	2,800
FC Vaduz	Liechtenstein	Rheinpark Stadion	7,584

=== Final league table ===
Pos	Team	Pld	W	D	L	GF	GA	GD	Pts	Qualification or relegation
1	FC Altstätten (St. Gallen)	26	13	11	2	35	14	+21	37	Play-off to Nationalliga B
2	FC Red Star Zürich	26	13	8	5	38	24	+14	34	To decider for second place
3	FC Chur	26	15	4	7	57	45	+12	34	To decider for second place
4	FC Dübendorf	26	11	10	5	44	31	+13	32	
5	FC Brüttisellen	26	11	10	5	33	22	+11	32	
6	FC Einsiedeln	26	12	5	9	45	39	+6	29	
7	FC Vaduz	26	11	3	12	53	51	+2	25	
8	FC Rorschach	26	8	7	11	40	40	0	23	
9	FC Stäfa	26	9	4	13	36	44	−8	22	
10	FC Herisau	26	8	6	12	30	40	−10	22	
11	FC Tuggen	26	8	5	13	32	42	−10	21	
12	FC Küsnacht	26	5	9	12	27	42	−15	19	
13	FC Gossau	26	6	5	15	25	37	−12	17	Relegation to 2. Liga Interregional
14	FC Rüti	26	4	9	13	23	47	−24	17	Relegation to 2. Liga Interregional

Source: RSSSF
Rules for classification: 1) Points; 2) Goal difference within the league, but decider play-off for qualifiers.

=== Decider for second position ===
The decider was played on 2 June 1987 in Tuggen

Team 1	Score	Team 2
FC Chur	2–2 a.e.t. 5–4 pen.	FC Red Star Zürich

FC Chur win 5–4 in the penalty-shoot-out and advance to play-offs.

== Promotion play-off ==
=== First stage ===
Team 1	Score	Team 2
Yverdon-Sport FC	4–1	FC Altstätten
FC Altstätten	2–5	Yverdon-Sport FC

Yverdon-Sport FC win 9–3 on aggregate and are promoted to 1987–88 Nationalliga B.

Team 1	Score	Team 2
FC Solothurn	0–0	FC Bern
FC Bern	1–2	FC Solothurn

FC Solothurn win 2–1 on aggregate and are promoted to 1987–88 Nationalliga B.

Team 1	Score	Team 2
FC Montreux-Sports	1–1	SC Buochs
SC Buochs	0–2	FC Montreux-Sports

FC Montreux-Sports win 3–1 on aggregate and are promoted to 1987–88 Nationalliga B.

Team 1	Score	Team 2
FC Chur	0–1	BSC Old Boys
BSC Old Boys	0–2	FC Chur

FC Chur win 2–1 on aggregate and are promoted to 1987–88 Nationalliga B.

=== Final stage ===
Team 1	Score	Team 2
FC Altstätten	2–2	FC Olten
FC Olten	2–1	FC Altstätten

FC Olten win 4–3 on aggregate and remain in the 1987–88 Nationalliga B. FC Altstätten remain in the division for the 1987–88 Swiss 1. Liga season..

Team 1	Score	Team 2
FC Bern	3–2	FC Biel-Bienne
FC Biel-Bienne	5–2 a.e.t.	FC Bern

FC Biel-Bienne win 7–5 on aggregate and remain in the 1987–88 Nationalliga B. FC Bern remain in the division for the 1987–88 Swiss 1. Liga season..

Team 1	Score	Team 2
FC Renens	2–1	SC Buochs
SC Buochs	2–3	FC Renens

FC Renens win 5–3 on aggregate and remain in the 1987–88 Nationalliga B. SC Buochs remain in the division for the 1987–88 Swiss 1. Liga season..

Team 1	Score	Team 2
SC Kriens	0–4	BSC Old Boys
BSC Old Boys	2–1	SC Kriens

BSC Old Boys win 6–1 on aggregate and are promoted to the 1987–88 Nationalliga B. SC Kriens are relegated to remain in the division for the 1987–88 Swiss 1. Liga season..

== Promotion from 2.Liga to 1.Liga ==
The following twelve teams were promoted from the 2. Liga Interregional to next season's 1. Liga:

- FC Boudry
- Central Fribourg
- FC Embrach
- FC Frauenfeld
- FC Glarus
- SC Goldau
- FC Kilchberg
- SV Lyss
- FC Rapid Ostermundigen
- FC Raron
- FC Tresa
- Urania Genève Sport

== Further in Swiss football ==
- 1986–87 Nationalliga A
- 1986–87 Nationalliga B
- 1986–87 Swiss Cup

== Sources ==
- Switzerland 1986–87 at RSSSF

Preceded by 1985–86	Seasons in Swiss 1. Liga	Succeeded by 1987–88
