= 1985–86 Swiss 1. Liga =

1. Liga
- Season: 1985–86
- Champions: Overall champions FC Olten; Group 1: ES FC Malley; Group 2: FC Bern; Group 3: SC Kriens; Group 4: FC Einsiedeln
- Promoted: FC Olten; ES FC Malley; SC Kriens
- Relegated: Group 1: FC Stade Payerne; FC Stade Nyonnais; Group 2: FC Concordia Basel; SC Bümpliz 78; Group 3: SC Reiden; FC Tresa/Monteggio; Group 4: FC Frauenfeld; FC Balzers; SC Brühl
- Matches: 4 times 182 plus 13 play-offs and 4 play-outs

The 1985–86 Swiss 1. Liga was the 54th season of this league since its creation in 1931. At this time, the 1. Liga was the third tier of the Swiss football league system and it was the highest level of amateur football.

== Format ==
There were 56 clubs in the 1. Liga, divided into four regional groups, each with 14 teams. Within each group, the teams would play a double round-robin to decide their league position. Two points were awarded for a win. The four group winners and the four runners-up then contested a play-off round to decide the three promotion slots. The two last placed teams in each group were directly relegated to the 2. Liga (fourth tier). The four third-last placed teams would compete a play-out against the ninth relegation spot.

== Group 1 ==
=== Teams ===
Club	Canton	Stadium	Capacity
FC Echallens	Vaud	Sportplatz 3 Sapins	2,000
FC Fribourg	Fribourg	Stade Universitaire	9,000
Grand-Lancy FC	Geneva	Stade de Marignac	1,500
FC Leytron	Valais	Stade Saint-Martin	1,000
ES FC Malley	Vaud	Centre Sportif de la Tuilière	1,500
FC Monthey	Valais	Stade Philippe Pottier	1,800
FC Montreux-Sports	Vaud	Stade de Chailly	1,000
FC Saint-Jean GE	Geneva	Centre sportif de Varembé	3,000
FC Savièse	Valais	Stade St-Germain	2,000
FC Stade Lausanne	Vaud	Centre sportif de Vidy	1,000
FC Stade Nyonnais	Vaud	Stade de Colovray	7,200
FC Stade Payerne	Vaud	Stade Municipal	1,100
FC Vernier	Geneva	Stade municipal de Vernier	1,000
Yverdon-Sport FC	Vaud	Stade Municipal	6,600

=== Final league table ===
Pos	Team	Pld	W	D	L	GF	GA	GD	Pts	Qualification or relegation
1	ES FC Malley	26	17	4	5	79	39	+40	38	Play-off to Nationalliga B
2	FC Fribourg	26	14	8	4	54	23	+31	36	Play-off to Nationalliga B
3	Grand-Lancy FC	26	12	7	7	61	55	+6	31	
4	Yverdon-Sport FC	26	11	9	6	52	49	+3	31	
5	FC Montreux-Sports	26	10	8	8	53	46	+7	28	
6	FC Monthey	26	11	5	10	46	43	+3	27	
7	FC Savièse	26	8	10	8	35	36	−1	26	
8	FC Saint-Jean GE	26	9	7	10	50	50	0	25	
9	FC Stade Lausanne	26	10	4	12	46	50	−4	24	
10	FC Leytron	26	10	4	12	37	56	−19	24	
11	FC Echallens	26	7	8	11	37	39	−2	22	
12	FC Vernier	26	8	6	12	42	46	−4	22	Play-out against relegation
13	FC Stade Payerne	26	6	7	13	37	63	−26	19	Relegation to 2. Liga Interregional
14	FC Stade Nyonnais	26	4	3	19	27	61	−34	11	Relegation to 2. Liga Interregional

Source: RSSSF
Rules for classification: 1) Points; 2) Goal difference within the league, but decider play-off for qualifiers.

== Group 2 ==
=== Teams ===
Club	Canton	Stadium	Capacity
FC Bern	Bern	Stadion Neufeld	14,000
SC Burgdorf	canton of Bern	Stadion Neumatt	3,850
FC Concordia Basel	Basel-City	Stadion Rankhof	7,000
FC Breitenbach	Solothurn	Grien	2,000
SC Bümpliz 78	Bern	Bodenweid	4,000
FC Colombier	Neuchâtel	Stade des Chézards	2,500
SR Delémont	Jura	La Blancherie	5,263
FC Köniz	Bern	Sportplatz Liebefeld-Hessgut	2,600
FC Langenthal	Bern	Rankmatte	2,000
FC Lengnau	Bern	Moos Lengnau BE	3,900
FC Nordstern Basel	Basel-Stadt	Rankhof	7,600
BSC Old Boys	Basel-Stadt	Stadion Schützenmatte	8,000
FC Solothurn	Solothurn	Stadion FC Solothurn	6,750
FC Thun	Bern	Stadion Lachen	10,350

=== Final league table ===
Pos	Team	Pld	W	D	L	GF	GA	GD	Pts	Qualification or relegation
1	FC Bern	26	16	6	4	44	16	+28	38	Play-off to Nationalliga B
2	FC Lengnau	26	11	9	6	47	38	+9	31	Play-off to Nationalliga B
3	FC Colombier	26	10	10	6	45	36	+9	30	
4	BSC Old Boys	26	11	5	10	46	39	+7	27	
5	SC Burgdorf	26	8	11	7	30	36	−6	27	
6	FC Breitenbach	26	9	7	10	38	37	+1	25	
7	FC Köniz	26	8	9	9	43	45	−2	25	
8	FC Thun	26	7	10	9	39	40	−1	24	
9	FC Solothurn	26	6	12	8	28	34	−6	24	
10	SR Delémont	26	7	10	9	38	48	−10	24	
11	FC Nordstern Basel	26	8	7	11	44	43	+1	23	
12	FC Langenthal	26	7	9	10	41	42	−1	23	Decider for twelfth place
13	FC Concordia Basel	26	6	11	9	39	55	−16	23	Decider for twelfth place
14	SC Bümpliz 78	26	7	6	13	36	49	−13	20	Relegation to 2. Liga Interregional

Source: RSSSF
Rules for classification: 1) Points; 2) Goal difference within the league, but decider play-off for qualifiers.

=== Decider for twelfth place ===
The decider was played on 27 May at La Blancherie in Delémont.

Team 1	Score	Team 2
FC Langenthal	4–1	FC Concordia Basel

FC Langenthal win and continue in play-outs. FC Concordia Basel are relegated directly to 2. Liga Interregional.

== Group 3 ==
=== Teams ===
Club	Canton	Stadium	Capacity
FC Altdorf	Uri	Gemeindesportplatz	4,000
FC Ascona	Ticino	Stadio Comunale Ascona	1,400
SC Buochs	Nidwalden	Stadion Seefeld	5,000
FC Emmenbrücke	Lucerne	Stadion Gersag	8,700
FC Ibach	Schwyz	Gerbihof	3,300
FC Klus-Balsthal	Solothurn	Sportplatz Moos	4,000
SC Kriens	Lucerne	Stadion Kleinfeld	5,100
FC Olten	Solothurn	Sportanlagen Kleinholz	8,000
FC Tresa/Monteggio	Ticino	Cornaredo Stadium	6,330
FC Mendrisio	Ticino	Centro Sportivo Comunale	4,000
FC Muri	Aargau	Stadion Brühl	2,350
SC Reiden	Lucerne	Kleinfeld	1,000
FC Suhr	Aargau	Hofstattmatten	2,000
FC Sursee	Lucerne	Stadion Schlottermilch	3,500

=== Final league table ===
Pos	Team	Pld	W	D	L	GF	GA	GD	Pts	Qualification or relegation
1	SC Kriens	26	16	5	5	68	36	+32	37	Play-off to Nationalliga B
2	FC Olten	26	16	5	5	57	31	+26	37	Play-off to Nationalliga B
3	FC Mendrisio	26	13	9	4	48	23	+25	35	
4	SC Buochs	26	12	8	6	43	35	+8	32	
5	FC Sursee	26	10	10	6	48	36	+12	30	
6	FC Ibach	26	9	7	10	41	48	−7	25	
7	FC Ascona	26	7	10	9	26	34	−8	24	
8	FC Suhr	26	8	8	10	30	43	−13	24	
9	FC Emmenbrücke	26	8	7	11	48	44	+4	23	
10	FC Klus-Balsthal	26	6	11	9	33	40	−7	23	
11	FC Altdorf (Uri)	26	7	9	10	41	49	−8	23	
12	FC Muri	26	7	9	10	36	52	−16	23	Play-out against relegation
13	SC Reiden	26	3	9	14	28	48	−20	15	Relegation to 2. Liga Interregional
14	FC Tresa/Monteggio	26	2	9	15	25	53	−28	13	Relegation to 2. Liga Interregional

Source: RSSSF
Rules for classification: 1) Points; 2) Goal difference within the league, but decider play-off for qualifiers.

== Group 4 ==
=== Teams ===
Club	Canton	Stadium	Capacity
FC Altstätten (St. Gallen)	St. Gallen	Grüntal Altstätten	1,000
FC Balzers	Liechtenstein	Sportplatz Rheinau	2,000
SC Brühl	St. Gallen	Paul-Grüninger-Stadion	4,200
FC Brüttisellen	Zürich	Lindenbuck	1,000
FC Dübendorf	Zürich	Zelgli	1,500
FC Einsiedeln	Schwyz	Rappenmöösli	1,300
FC Frauenfeld	Thurgau	Kleine Allmend	6,370
FC Gossau	St. Gallen	Sportanlage Buechenwald	3,500
FC Küsnacht	Zürich	Sportanlage Heslibach	2,300
FC Red Star Zürich	Zürich	Allmend Brunau	2,000
FC Rorschach	Schwyz	Sportplatz Kellen	1,000
FC Rüti	Zürich	Schützenwiese	1,200
FC Stäfa	Zürich	Sportanlage Frohberg	1,500
FC Vaduz	Liechtenstein	Rheinpark Stadion	7,584

=== Final league table ===
Pos	Team	Pld	W	D	L	GF	GA	GD	Pts	Qualification or relegation
1	FC Einsiedeln	26	14	8	4	52	30	+22	36	Play-off to Nationalliga B
2	FC Red Star Zürich	26	14	7	5	54	23	+31	35	Play-off to Nationalliga B
3	FC Rorschach	26	13	6	7	44	32	+12	32	
4	FC Vaduz	26	11	6	9	46	38	+8	28	
5	FC Gossau	26	9	9	8	40	37	+3	27	
6	FC Stäfa	26	9	8	9	36	34	+2	26	
7	FC Rüti	26	8	9	9	33	33	0	25	
8	FC Dübendorf	26	8	7	11	38	39	−1	23	
9	FC Brüttisellen	26	10	3	13	38	49	−11	23	
10	FC Küsnacht	26	9	5	12	35	49	−14	23	
11	FC Altstätten (St. Gallen)	26	8	6	12	36	48	−12	22	
12	FC Frauenfeld	26	8	6	12	35	51	−16	22	Play-out against relegation
13	FC Balzers	26	8	5	13	39	47	−8	21	Relegation to 2. Liga Interregional
14	SC Brühl	26	7	7	12	31	47	−16	21	Relegation to 2. Liga Interregional

Source: RSSSF
Rules for classification: 1) Points; 2) Goal difference within the league, but decider play-off for qualifiers.

== Promotion play-off ==
=== Qualification round ===
Team 1	Score	Team 2
SC Kriens	0–0	FC Red Star Zürich
FC Red Star Zürich	1–1	SC Kriens

SC Kriens win on away goals and continue to the finals.

Team 1	Score	Team 2
FC Lengnau	3–3	ES FC Malley
ES FC Malley	4–1	FC Lengnau

ES FC Malley win 7–4 on aggregate and continue to the finals.

Team 1	Score	Team 2
FC Fribourg	0–1	FC Einsiedeln
FC Einsiedeln	0–2	FC Fribourg

FC Fribourg win 2–1 on aggregate and continue to the finals.

Team 1	Score	Team 2
FC Bern	0–3	FC Olten
FC Olten	7–0	FC Bern

FC Olten win 10–0 on aggregate and continue to the finals.

=== Final round ===
Team 1	Score	Team 2
FC Olten	3–0	SC Kriens
SC Kriens	1–1	FC Olten

FC Olten win 4–1 on aggregate and are promoted to 1986–87 Nationalliga B.

Team 1	Score	Team 2
FC Fribourg	1–0	ES FC Malley
ES FC Malley	2–0	FC Fribourg

ES FC Malley win 2–1 on aggregate and are promoted to 1986–87 Nationalliga B.

=== Decider for third place ===
Team 1	Score	Team 2
FC Fribourg	2–1	SC Kriens
SC Kriens	3–1	FC Fribourg

SC Kriens win 4–3 on aggregate and are promoted to 1986–87 Nationalliga B. FC Fribourg remain in the division.

=== Final for championship ===
Team 1	Score	Team 2
FC Olten	4–3	ES FC Malley

FC Olten win and are declaied 1. Liga champions.

== Relegation play-out ==
The four third-last placed teams from each group, competed a play-out against the ninth and last relegation spot.

=== First round ===
Team 1	Score	Team 2
FC Langenthal	0–0 a.e.t. 4–2 pen.	FC Vernier

FC Vernier continue to the final round.

Team 1	Score	Team 2
FC Muri	2–1	FC Frauenfeld

FC Frauenfeld continue to the final round.

=== Final round ===
Team 1	Score	Team 2
FC Frauenfeld	0–1	FC Vernier
FC Vernier	4–0	FC Frauenfeld

FC Vernier win 5–0 on aggregate. FC Frauenfeld are relegated as ninth and final team to the 2. Liga.

== Further in Swiss football ==
- 1985–86 Nationalliga A
- 1985–86 Nationalliga B
- 1985–86 Swiss Cup

== Sources ==
- Switzerland 1985–86 at RSSSF

Preceded by 1984–85	Seasons in Swiss 1. Liga	Succeeded by 1986–87
