= 1985–86 Nationalliga A =

Swiss football season

Nationalliga A
- Season: 1985–86
- Champions: Young Boys
- Relegated: Grenchen; Baden
- Top goalscorer: Steen Thychosen; Lausanne-Sport (21 goals)

Nationalliga B
- Season: 1985–86
- Champions: FC Locarno
- Promoted: FC Locarno; AC Bellinzona
- Relegated: FC Zug; FC Laufen; FC Le Locle
- Top goalscorer: Wolfgang Vöge; Lugano (29 goals)

Statistics of the Swiss National League in the 1985–86 football season, both Nationalliga A and Nationalliga B. This was the 89th season of top-tier Swiss football.

== Overview ==
There were 32 member clubs in the Swiss Football Association (ASF/SFV), divided into two tiers of 16 teams each. The top tier was named Nationalliga A (NLA) and the second tier was named Nationalliga B (NLB). In both divisions the teams played a double round-robin to decide their table positions. The Swiss champions would qualify for the 1986–87 European Cup, the runners-up and third placed team would qualify for the 1986–87 UEFA Cup. The last two placed teams in the NLA would be directly relegated to the NLB for the following season. The top two placed teams in the NLB would be promoted to the top tier. The last three teams in the NLB would be relegated to next season's 1. Liga.

== Nationalliga A ==
The first round was played on 7 August 1985. There was to be a winter break between 23 November and 2 March 1986. The season was completed on 27 May 1987.

=== Final league table ===
Pos	Team	Pld	W	D	L	GF	GA	GD	Pts	Qualification
1	Young Boys	30	18	8	4	72	28	+44	44	Swiss champions, qualified for 1986–87 European Cup and entered 1986 Intertoto Cup
2	Xamax	30	18	6	6	78	32	+46	42	Qualified for 1986–87 UEFA Cup
3	Luzern	30	16	9	5	56	39	+17	41	Qualified for 1986–87 UEFA Cup and entered 1986 Intertoto Cup
4	Zürich	30	15	9	6	64	43	+21	39	Entered 1986 Intertoto Cup
5	Grasshopper Club	30	15	8	7	64	32	+32	38	Entered 1986 Intertoto Cup
6	Lausanne-Sport	30	13	9	8	59	50	+9	35	Entered 1986 Intertoto Cup
7	Aarau	30	14	6	10	62	47	+15	34	
8	Sion	30	14	5	11	54	39	+15	33	Swiss Cup winners, qualified for 1986–87 Cup Winners' Cup
9	Servette	30	14	3	13	49	50	−1	31	
10	Basel	30	10	10	10	44	40	+4	30	
11	St. Gallen	30	12	6	12	48	46	+2	30	Entered 1986 Intertoto Cup
12	Wettingen	30	8	8	14	35	42	−7	24	
13	La Chaux-de-Fonds	30	3	12	15	24	61	−37	18	
14	Vevey-Sports	30	6	5	19	36	76	−40	17	
15	Grenchen	30	5	6	19	33	81	−48	16	Relegated to 1986–87 Nationalliga B
16	Baden	30	1	6	23	14	86	−72	8	Relegated to 1986–87 Nationalliga B

Source: rsssf.com
Rules for classification: 1) Points; 2) Goal difference; 3) Goals scored; 4) Head-to-head points; 5) Away goals scored; 6) Draw.

=== Results ===
Home \ Away	AAR	BAD	BAS	CHF	GCZ	GRE	LS	LUZ	NX	SER	SIO	STG	VEV	WET	YB	ZÜR
Aarau		4–0	2–1	5–1	1–2	6–2	2–2	5–1	0–1	1–3	2–0	2–1	3–1	4–0	0–4	1–2
Baden	0–1		1–3	1–1	1–8	1–6	2–2	0–1	0–2	1–4	0–2	0–1	2–3	0–5	0–2	0–2
Basel	4–1	5–0		2–0	2–2	3–0	0–3	0–1	1–1	2–0	1–0	3–1	5–2	0–3	0–1	3–3
Chaux-de-Fonds	1–1	1–1	0–0		1–1	2–0	0–4	1–3	0–3	1–1	2–1	1–2	3–1	0–1	1–1	0–0
Grasshopper Club	3–0	3–0	0–0	5–1		6–0	1–0	5–0	2–3	0–1	2–1	0–0	5–1	2–1	2–0	1–3
Grenchen	0–1	1–1	1–0	1–1	0–2		1–1	2–2	1–3	4–1	1–1	0–2	2–1	1–0	0–6	1–8
Lausanne-Sports	2–1	2–0	2–2	2–2	1–0	3–0		0–1	0–2	3–0	3–6	1–0	5–2	0–0	3–3	5–2
Luzern	1–1	3–0	4–0	3–0	0–0	4–0	5–1		2–7	1–1	3–1	2–1	2–1	1–0	1–1	3–0
Xamax	1–1	8–0	4–0	4–2	4–2	4–1	4–0	0–0		0–1	2–1	2–1	5–1	2–0	1–4	9–1
Servette	4–2	1–1	1–2	3–1	3–0	2–1	3–1	0–4	2–1		0–2	4–1	4–1	3–1	1–4	1–2
Sion	4–2	1–0	1–0	1–1	1–1	6–1	1–2	1–2	3–1	2–1		2–0	2–0	2–1	2–3	1–1
St. Gallen	1–2	4–0	1–1	4–0	2–2	3–2	2–2	2–2	2–1	4–1	2–0		2–0	4–2	2–5	1–1
Vevey-Sports	1–1	0–0	2–2	2–0	0–3	3–0	0–3	4–2	2–2	1–0	0–5	1–2		1–1	3–2	2–4
Wettingen	1–6	2–1	1–1	0–0	0–2	0–0	4–1	1–1	0–0	0–3	1–2	3–0	4–0		0–0	2–1
Young Boys	2–0	0–1	1–1	4–0	3–0	6–3	2–2	3–0	2–1	3–0	1–1	3–0	3–0	2–1		3–0
Zürich	0–2	8–0	1–0	4–0	2–2	2–1	2–3	1–1	0–0	3–0	3–1	1–0	2–0	2–0	0–0	

Legend: Blue = home team win; Yellow = draw; Red = away team win.

== Nationalliga B ==
The first round was played on 3 August 1985. There was to be a winter break between 24 November and 2 March 1986. The season was completed on 28 May 1986.

=== Final league table ===
Pos	Team	Pld	W	D	L	GF	GA	GD	Pts	Qualification
1	FC Locarno	30	20	5	5	96	33	+63	45	NLB champions, promoted to 1986–87 Nationalliga A
2	AC Bellinzona	30	18	9	3	58	24	+34	45	Promoted to 1986–87 Nationalliga A
3	Lugano	30	19	5	6	74	45	+29	43	
4	CS Chênois	30	15	11	4	71	44	+27	41	
5	FC Chiasso	30	13	9	8	48	41	+7	35	
6	FC Winterthur	30	12	7	11	57	56	+1	31	
7	FC Bulle	30	10	8	12	45	51	−6	28	
8	FC Biel-Bienne	30	9	9	12	45	55	−10	27	
9	FC Martigny-Sports	30	10	6	14	48	56	−8	26	
10	SC Zug	30	8	9	13	41	49	−8	25	
11	FC Renens	30	10	5	15	42	53	−11	25	
12	Etoile Carouge FC	30	8	9	13	34	47	−13	25	
13	FC Schaffhausen	30	8	9	13	36	51	−15	25	
14	FC Zug	30	7	9	14	39	51	−12	23	Relegated to 1986–87 1. Liga
15	FC Laufen	30	6	8	16	42	70	−28	20	Relegated to 1986–87 1. Liga
16	FC Le Locle	30	7	2	21	39	89	−50	16	Relegated to 1986–87 1. Liga

Source: rsssf.com
Rules for classification: 1) Points; 2) Goal difference; 3) Goals scored; 4) Head-to-head points; 5) Away goals scored; 6) Draw.

== Attendances ==
#	Club	Average
1	Young Boys	10,500
2	Luzern	9,760
3	Xamax	9,300
4	Aarau	6,080
5	Sion	5,600
6	St. Gallen	5,407
7	Basel	5,057
8	GCZ	5,055
9	Servette	4,920
10	Lausanne	4,160
11	Grenchen	4,153
12	Zürich	4,110
13	Wettingen	3,013
14	Vevey	2,587
15	La Chaux-de-Fonds	2,340
16	Baden	1,783

== Further in Swiss football ==
- 1985–86 Swiss Cup
- 1985–86 Swiss 1. Liga

== Sources ==
- Switzerland 1985–86 at RSSSF

Preceded by 1985–86	Nationalliga seasons in Switzerland	Succeeded by 1987–88
