= 1988–89 Swiss 1. Liga =

1. Liga
- Season: 1988–89
- Champions: Group 1: FC Châtel-Saint-Denis; Group 2: FC Laufen; Group 3: SC Kriens; Group 4: FC Altstätten
- Promoted: FC Fribourg; FC Zug; FC Brüttisellen
- Relegated: Group 1: Grand-Lancy FC; Central Fribourg; FC Stade Lausanne; Group 2: FC Köniz; FC Rapid Ostermundigen; Group 3: FC Altdorf; FC Olten; Group 4: FC Stäfa; FC Frauenfeld
- Matches: 4 times 182 plus 14 play-offs and 4 play-outs

The 1988–89 Swiss 1. Liga was the 57th season of this league since its creation in 1931. At this time, the 1. Liga was the third tier of the Swiss football league system and it was the highest level of amateur football.

== Format ==
There were 56 clubs in the 1. Liga, divided into four regional groups, each with 14 teams. Within each group, the teams would play a double round-robin to decide their league position. Two points were awarded for a win. The four group winners and the four runners-up then contested a play-off for the three promotion slots. The two last placed teams in each group were directly relegated to the 2. Liga (fourth tier). The four third-last placed teams would compete a play-out against the ninth relegation spot.

== Group 1 ==
=== Teams ===
Club	Canton	Stadium	Capacity
FC Aigle	Vaud	Les Glariers	1,000
FC Beauregard Fribourg	Fribourg	Guintzet	2,000
FC Central Fribourg	Fribourg	Guintzet	2,000
FC Châtel-Saint-Denis	Fribourg	Stade du Lussy - Châtel-St-Denis	1,000
Concordia/Folgore Lausanne	Vaud	Centre Sportif de la Tuilière	1,000
FC Echallens	Vaud	Sportplatz 3 Sapins	2,000
FC Fribourg	Fribourg	Stade Universitaire	9,000
FC Fully	Valais	Stade de Charnot	1,000
Grand-Lancy FC	Geneva	Stade de Marignac	1,500
FC Monthey	Valais	Stade Philippe Pottier	1,800
FC Raron	Valais	Sportplatz Rhoneglut	1,000
FC Stade Lausanne	Vaud	Centre sportif de Vidy	1,000
FC Stade Nyonnais	Vaud	Stade de Colovray	7,200
Vevey Sports	Vaud	Stade de Copet	4,000

=== Final league table ===
Pos	Team	Pld	W	D	L	GF	GA	GD	Pts	Qualification or relegation
1	FC Châtel-Saint-Denis	26	17	5	4	53	20	+33	39	Play-off to Nationalliga B
2	FC Fribourg	26	12	10	4	44	26	+18	34	Play-off to Nationalliga B
3	FC Echallens	26	12	6	8	48	48	0	30	
4	FC Raron	26	12	5	9	47	37	+10	29	
5	FC Fully	26	11	5	10	39	35	+4	27	
6	FC Aigle	26	11	5	10	43	41	+2	27	
7	Vevey Sports	26	9	8	9	37	36	+1	26	
8	FC Monthey	26	9	7	10	35	31	+4	25	
9	FC Beauregard Fribourg	26	8	8	10	49	52	−3	24	
10	FC Stade Nyonnais	26	9	6	11	37	51	−14	24	
11	Concordia/Folgore Lausanne	26	7	8	11	27	36	−9	22	
12	FC Stade Lausanne	26	5	11	10	33	43	−10	21	Play-out against relegation
13	Grand-Lancy FC	26	6	8	12	37	47	−10	20	Relegation to 2. Liga Interregional
14	Central Fribourg	26	5	6	15	29	55	−26	16	Relegation to 2. Liga Interregional

Source: RSSSF
Rules for classification: 1) Points; 2) Goal difference within the league, but decider play-off for qualifiers.

== Group 2 ==
=== Teams ===
Club	Canton	Stadium	Capacity
FC Bern	Bern	Stadion Neufeld	14,000
FC Breitenbach	Solothurn	Grien	2,000
FC Boudry	Neuchâtel	Stade des Buchilles	1,500
SC Burgdorf	canton of Bern	Stadion Neumatt	3,850
FC Colombier	Neuchâtel	Stade des Chézards	2,500
SR Delémont	Jura	La Blancherie	5,263
FC Köniz	Bern	Sportplatz Liebefeld-Hessgut	2,600
FC Laufen	Basel-Country	Sportplatz Nau	3,000
FC Le Locle	Neuchâtel	Installation sportive - Jeanneret	3,142
SV Lyss	Bern	Sportzentrum Grien	2,000
FC Moutier	Bern	Stade de Chalière	5,000
FC Münsingen	Bern	Sportanlage Sandreutenen	1,400
FC Rapid Ostermundigen	Bern	Oberfeld	1,000
FC Thun	Bern	Stadion Lachen	10,350

=== Final league table ===
Pos	Team	Pld	W	D	L	GF	GA	GD	Pts	Qualification or relegation
1	FC Laufen	26	16	9	1	62	21	+41	41	Play-off to Nationalliga B
2	FC Thun	26	16	5	5	72	36	+36	37	Play-off to Nationalliga B
3	SC Burgdorf	26	14	6	6	55	39	+16	34	
4	SV Lyss	26	12	8	6	34	28	+6	32	
5	FC Münsingen	26	13	4	9	55	38	+17	30	
6	FC Moutier	26	11	7	8	45	26	+19	29	
7	FC Colombier	26	11	6	9	38	35	+3	28	
8	FC Bern	26	9	8	9	41	41	0	26	
9	FC Breitenbach	26	8	10	8	41	41	0	26	
10	SR Delémont	26	8	5	13	41	48	−7	21	
11	FC Le Locle	26	7	7	12	34	48	−14	21	
12	FC Boudry	26	5	5	16	16	49	−33	15	Play-out against relegation
13	FC Rapid Ostermundigen	26	5	4	17	40	75	−35	14	Relegation to 2. Liga Interregional
14	FC Köniz	26	4	2	20	25	74	−49	10	Relegation to 2. Liga Interregional

Source: RSSSF
Rules for classification: 1) Points; 2) Goal difference within the league, but decider play-off for qualifiers.

== Group 3 ==
=== Teams ===
Club	Canton	Stadium	Capacity
FC Altdorf	Uri	Gemeindesportplatz	4,000
FC Ascona	Ticino	Stadio Comunale Ascona	1,400
SC Buochs	Nidwalden	Stadion Seefeld	5,000
FC Klus-Balsthal	Solothurn	Sportplatz Moos	4,000
SC Kriens	Lucerne	Stadion Kleinfeld	5,100
FC Mendrisio	Ticino	Centro Sportivo Comunale	4,000
FC Muri	Aargau	Stadion Brühl	2,350
FC Olten	Solothurn	Sportanlagen Kleinholz	8,000
FC Pratteln	Basel-Country	In den Sandgruben	5,000
FC Solothurn	Solothurn	Stadion FC Solothurn	6,750
FC Suhr	Aargau	Hofstattmatten	2,000
FC Tresa/Monteggio	Ticino	Centro Sportivo Passera	1,280
FC Wohlen	Aargau	Stadion Niedermatten	3,734
FC Zug	Zug	Herti Allmend Stadion	6,000

=== Final league table ===
Pos	Team	Pld	W	D	L	GF	GA	GD	Pts	Qualification or relegation
1	SC Kriens	26	14	8	4	48	27	+21	36	Play-off to Nationalliga B
2	FC Zug	26	11	11	4	31	18	+13	33	Play-off to Nationalliga B
3	FC Ascona	26	11	10	5	37	22	+15	32	
4	FC Solothurn	26	12	6	8	43	32	+11	30	
5	SC Buochs	26	10	8	8	37	30	+7	28	
6	FC Mendrisio	26	11	6	9	37	38	−1	28	
7	FC Pratteln	26	9	10	7	29	31	−2	28	
8	FC Tresa/Monteggio	26	10	7	9	34	37	−3	27	
9	FC Muri	26	6	13	7	34	32	+2	25	
10	FC Klus-Balsthal	26	9	7	10	30	28	+2	25	
11	FC Suhr	26	5	13	8	31	35	−4	23	
12	FC Wohlen	26	6	7	13	25	40	−15	19	Play-out against relegation
13	FC Olten	26	3	11	12	17	35	−18	17	Relegation to 2. Liga Interregional
14	FC Altdorf (Uri)	26	2	9	15	23	51	−28	13	Relegation to 2. Liga Interregional

Source: RSSSF
Rules for classification: 1) Points; 2) Goal difference within the league, but decider play-off for qualifiers.

== Group 4 ==
=== Teams ===
Club	Canton	Stadium	Capacity
FC Altstätten (St. Gallen)	St. Gallen	Grüntal Altstätten	1,000
SC Brühl	St. Gallen	Paul-Grüninger-Stadion	4,200
FC Brüttisellen	Zürich	Lindenbuck	1,000
FC Einsiedeln	Schwyz	Rappenmöösli	1,300
FC Frauenfeld	Thurgau	Kleine Allmend	6,370
FC Herisau	Appenzell Ausserrhoden	Ebnet	2,000
FC Kilchberg	Zürich	Hochweid	1,000
FC Landquart	Graubünden	Stadion Ried	1,000
FC Red Star Zürich	Zürich	Allmend Brunau	2,000
FC Rorschach	Schwyz	Sportplatz Kellen	1,000
FC Stäfa	Zürich	Sportanlage Frohberg	1,500
FC Tuggen	Schwyz	Linthstrasse	2,800
FC Vaduz	Liechtenstein	Rheinpark Stadion	7,584
SC Veltheim	Aargau	Sportanlage Flüeli	2,000

=== Final league table ===
Pos	Team	Pld	W	D	L	GF	GA	GD	Pts	Qualification or relegation
1	FC Altstätten (St. Gallen)	26	14	6	6	56	39	+17	34	Play-off to Nationalliga B
2	FC Brüttisellen	26	12	8	6	50	26	+24	32	Play-off to Nationalliga B
3	FC Herisau	26	11	8	7	43	37	+6	30	
4	FC Tuggen	26	11	7	8	42	30	+12	29	
5	FC Red Star Zürich	26	10	9	7	48	38	+10	29	
6	SC Veltheim	26	11	7	8	45	42	+3	29	
7	FC Landquart	26	10	8	8	34	40	−6	28	
8	FC Rorschach	26	8	9	9	35	34	+1	25	
9	FC Kilchberg	26	7	10	9	37	37	0	24	
10	SC Brühl	26	7	9	10	37	50	−13	23	
11	FC Vaduz	26	7	7	12	30	37	−7	21	
12	FC Einsiedeln	26	4	13	9	32	41	−9	21	Play-out against relegation
13	FC Stäfa	26	7	7	12	38	55	−17	21	Relegation to 2. Liga Interregional
14	FC Frauenfeld	26	7	4	15	29	50	−21	18	Relegation to 2. Liga Interregional

Source: RSSSF
Rules for classification: 1) Points; 2) Goal difference within the league, but decider play-off for qualifiers.

== Promotion play-off ==
=== Qualification round ===
Team 1	Score	Team 2
Altstätten	1–1	FC Thun
FC Thun	2–0	Altstätten

FC Thun win 3–1 on aggregate and continue to the finals.

Team 1	Score	Team 2
SC Kriens	2–3	FC Fribourg
FC Fribourg	2–1	SC Kriens

FC Fribourg win 5–3 on aggregate and continue to the finals.

Team 1	Score	Team 2
FC Zug	3–1	Châtel-Saint-Denis
Châtel-Saint-Denis	3–3	FC Zug

FC Zug win 6–4 on aggregate and continue to the finals.

Team 1	Score	Team 2
FC Laufen	0–0	Brüttisellen
Brüttisellen	1–0	FC Laufen

Brüttisellen win 1–0 on aggregate and continue to the finals.

=== Final round ===
Team 1	Score	Team 2
Brüttisellen	2–1	FC Fribourg
FC Fribourg	2–0	Brüttisellen

FC Fribourg win 3–2 on aggregate and are promoted to 1989–90 Nationalliga B.

Team 1	Score	Team 2
FC Thun	1–2	FC Zug
FC Zug	2–0	FC Thun

FC Zug win 4–1 on aggregate and are promoted to 1989–90 Nationalliga B.

=== Decider for third place ===
The play-off for the third promotion place was played on 24 June 1989 in Burgdorf.

Team 1	Score	Team 2
Brüttisellen	2–2 a.e.t. 3–2 pen.	FC Thun

FC Brüttisellen win after penalty shoot-out and are promoted to 1989–90 Nationalliga B

=== Decider for championship ===
The play-off for the championship place was played on 24 June 1989.

Team 1	Score	Team 2
FC Zug	5–1	FC Fribourg

FC Zug win and are declared 1.Liga champions.

== Relegation play-out ==
=== First round ===
The first play-out against relegation was played on 4 June in Kilchberg.

Team 1	Score	Team 2
FC Wohlen	3–0	Einsiedeln

Einsiedeln continue to the final.

The second play-out against relegation was played on 4 June in Echallens.

Team 1	Score	Team 2
FC Stade Lausanne	1–2	FC Boudry

FC Stade Lausanne continue to the final.

=== Final round ===
The play-out against relegation was played on 11 and 18 June 1989.

Team 1	Score	Team 2
FC Stade Lausanne	1–2	Einsiedeln
Einsiedeln	2–2	FC Stade Lausanne

Einsiedeln win 4–3 on aggregate. FC Stade Lausanne are relegated to 2. Liga.

== Further in Swiss football ==
- 1988–89 Nationalliga A
- 1988–89 Nationalliga B
- 1988–89 Swiss Cup

== Sources ==
- Switzerland 1988–89 at RSSSF

Preceded by 1987–88	Seasons in Swiss 1. Liga	Succeeded by 1989–90
