= 1989–90 Swiss 1. Liga =

1. Liga
- Season: 1989–90
- Champions: Group 1: Urania Genève Sport; Group 2: FC Thun; Group 3: SC Kriens; Group 4: SC Brühl
- Promoted: Urania Genève Sport; SC Burgdorf; SC Kriens
- Relegated: Group 1: FC Stade Nyonnais; FC Bramois; Group 2: FC Biel-Bienne; FC Boudry; Group 3: FC Muri; SC Derendingen; Group 4: FC Vaduz; FC Landquart; FC Wohlen
- Matches: 4 times 182 plus 14 play-offs and 4 play-outs

The 1989–90 Swiss 1. Liga was the 58th season of this league since its creation in 1931. At this time, the 1. Liga was the third tier of the Swiss football league system and it was the highest level of amateur football.

== Format ==
There were 56 clubs in the 1. Liga, divided into four regional groups, each with 14 teams. Within each group, the teams would play a double round-robin to decide their league position. Two points were awarded for a win. The four group winners and the four runners-up then contested a play-off for the three promotion slots. The two last placed teams in each group were directly relegated to the 2. Liga (fourth tier). The four third-last placed teams would compete a play-out against the ninth relegation spot.

== Group 1 ==
=== Teams ===
Club	Canton	Stadium	Capacity
FC Aigle	Vaud	Les Glariers	1,000
FC Beauregard Fribourg	Fribourg	Guintzet	2,000
FC Bramois	Valais	Stade du Bois-de-la-Borgne/Glareys	1,000
FC Châtel-Saint-Denis	Fribourg	Stade du Lussy - Châtel-St-Denis	1,000
FC Collex-Bossy	Geneva	Stade Marc Burdet	1,000
Concordia/Folgore Lausanne	Vaud	Centre Sportif de la Tuilière	1,000
FC Echallens	Vaud	Sportplatz 3 Sapins	2,000
FC Fully	Valais	Stade de Charnot	1,000
FC Monthey	Valais	Stade Philippe Pottier	1,800
FC Raron	Valais	Sportplatz Rhoneglut	1,000
FC Renens	Waadt	Zone sportive du Censuy	2,300
FC Stade Nyonnais	Vaud	Stade de Colovray	7,200
Urania Genève Sport	Geneva	Stade de Frontenex	4,000
Vevey Sports	Vaud	Stade de Copet	4,000

=== Final league table ===
Pos	Team	Pld	W	D	L	GF	GA	GD	Pts	Qualification or relegation
1	Urania Genève Sport	26	17	6	3	59	27	+32	40	Play-off to Nationalliga B
2	Concordia/Folgore Lausanne	26	14	9	3	49	24	+25	37	Play-off to Nationalliga B
3	FC Châtel-Saint-Denis	26	13	5	8	44	35	+9	31	
4	FC Renens	26	13	3	10	54	47	+7	29	
5	FC Monthey	26	10	8	8	50	39	+11	28	
6	FC Fully	26	10	7	9	39	41	−2	27	
7	FC Aigle	26	11	4	11	42	38	+4	26	
8	FC Beauregard Fribourg	26	10	5	11	39	32	+7	25	
9	Vevey Sports	26	8	8	10	34	37	−3	24	
10	FC Collex-Bossy	26	6	12	8	28	38	−10	24	
11	FC Echallens	26	7	8	11	40	51	−11	22	
12	FC Raron	26	7	7	12	32	44	−12	21	Play-out against relegation
13	FC Stade Nyonnais	26	4	7	15	33	60	−27	15	Relegation to 2. Liga Interregional
14	FC Bramois	26	6	3	17	37	67	−30	15	Relegation to 2. Liga Interregional

Source: RSSSF
Rules for classification: 1) Points; 2) Goal difference within the league, but decider play-off for qualifiers.

== Group 2 ==
=== Teams ===
Club	Canton	Stadium	Capacity
FC Bern	Bern	Stadion Neufeld	14,000
FC Biel-Bienne	Bern	Stadion Gurzelen	15,000
FC Breitenbach	Solothurn	Grien	2,000
FC Boudry	Neuchâtel	Stade des Buchilles	1,500
FC Colombier	Neuchâtel	Stade des Chézards	2,500
SR Delémont	Jura	La Blancherie	5,263
FC Domdidier	Fribourg	Terrains de football - Domdidier	1,000
FC Laufen	Basel-Country	Sportplatz Nau	3,000
FC Lerchenfeld	canton of Bern	Sportanlagen Waldeck	2,400
FC Le Locle	Neuchâtel	Installation sportive - Jeanneret	3,142
SV Lyss	Bern	Sportzentrum Grien	2,000
FC Moutier	Bern	Stade de Chalière	5,000
FC Münsingen	Bern	Sportanlage Sandreutenen	1,400
FC Thun	Bern	Stadion Lachen	10,350

=== Final league table ===
Pos	Team	Pld	W	D	L	GF	GA	GD	Pts	Qualification or relegation
1	FC Thun	26	17	6	3	67	33	+34	40	Play-off to Nationalliga B
2	FC Münsingen	26	15	6	5	46	27	+19	36	Play-off to Nationalliga B
3	SR Delémont	26	13	8	5	58	24	+34	34	
4	SV Lyss	26	13	7	6	36	22	+14	33	
5	FC Bern	26	11	8	7	41	35	+6	30	
6	FC Laufen	26	10	7	9	33	26	+7	27	
7	FC Colombier	26	10	5	11	41	42	−1	25	
8	FC Domdidier	26	8	8	10	38	46	−8	24	
9	FC Moutier	26	9	5	12	37	49	−12	23	
10	FC Le Locle	26	6	9	11	23	30	−7	21	
11	FC Lerchenfeld	26	7	6	13	38	44	−6	20	
12	FC Breitenbach	26	7	4	15	35	59	−24	18	Play-out against relegation
13	FC Biel-Bienne	26	5	7	14	24	54	−30	17	Relegation to 2. Liga Interregional
14	FC Boudry	26	4	8	14	20	46	−26	16	Relegation to 2. Liga Interregional

Source: RSSSF
Rules for classification: 1) Points; 2) Goal difference within the league, but decider play-off for qualifiers.

== Group 3 ==
=== Teams ===
Club	Canton	Stadium	Capacity
FC Ascona	Ticino	Stadio Comunale Ascona	1,400
SC Burgdorf	canton of Bern	Stadion Neumatt	3,850
SC Buochs	Nidwalden	Stadion Seefeld	5,000
SC Derendingen	Solothurn	Heidenegg	1,500
FC Klus-Balsthal	Solothurn	Sportplatz Moos	4,000
SC Kriens	Lucerne	Stadion Kleinfeld	5,100
FC Mendrisio	Ticino	Centro Sportivo Comunale	4,000
FC Muri	Aargau	Stadion Brühl	2,350
FC Pratteln	Basel-Country	In den Sandgruben	5,000
FC Riehen	Basel-City	Sportplatz Grendelmatte	2,500
FC Solothurn	Solothurn	Stadion FC Solothurn	6,750
FC Suhr	Aargau	Hofstattmatten	2,000
FC Sursee	Lucerne	Stadion Schlottermilch	3,500
FC Tresa/Monteggio	Ticino	Centro Sportivo Passera	1,280

=== Final league table ===
Pos	Team	Pld	W	D	L	GF	GA	GD	Pts	Qualification or relegation
1	SC Kriens	26	11	10	5	36	23	+13	32	Play-off to Nationalliga B
2	SC Burgdorf	26	11	9	6	41	30	+11	31	Play-off to Nationalliga B
3	FC Sursee	26	12	6	8	35	26	+9	30	
4	FC Ascona	26	10	8	8	31	27	+4	28	
5	FC Mendrisio	26	9	10	7	31	29	+2	28	
6	FC Solothurn	26	9	9	8	37	27	+10	27	
7	FC Tresa/Monteggio	26	9	9	8	33	35	−2	27	
8	FC Suhr	26	7	13	6	23	29	−6	27	
9	FC Pratteln	26	7	12	7	22	21	+1	26	
10	SC Buochs	26	6	13	7	30	28	+2	25	
11	FC Klus-Balsthal	26	7	10	9	29	35	−6	24	
12	FC Riehen	26	8	6	12	36	43	−7	22	Play-out against relegation
13	FC Muri	26	4	12	10	14	31	−17	20	Relegation to 2. Liga Interregional
14	SC Derendingen	26	7	3	16	28	42	−14	17	Relegation to 2. Liga Interregional

Source: RSSSF
Rules for classification: 1) Points; 2) Goal difference within the league, but decider play-off for qualifiers.

== Group 4 ==
=== Teams ===
Club	Canton	Stadium	Capacity
FC Altstätten (St. Gallen)	St. Gallen	Grüntal Altstätten	1,000
SC Brühl	St. Gallen	Paul-Grüninger-Stadion	4,200
FC Einsiedeln	Schwyz	Rappenmöösli	1,300
FC Herisau	Appenzell Ausserrhoden	Ebnet	2,000
FC Kilchberg	Zürich	Hochweid	1,000
FC Kreuzlingen	Thurgau	Sportplatz Hafenareal	1,200
FC Landquart	Graubünden	Stadion Ried	1,000
FC Red Star Zürich	Zürich	Allmend Brunau	2,000
FC Rorschach	Schwyz	Sportplatz Kellen	1,000
FC Tuggen	Schwyz	Linthstrasse	2,800
FC Vaduz	Liechtenstein	Rheinpark Stadion	7,584
SC Veltheim	Aargau	Sportanlage Flüeli	2,000
FC Wohlen	Aargau	Stadion Niedermatten	3,734
FC Young Fellows Zürich	Zürich	Utogrund	2,850

=== Final league table ===
Pos	Team	Pld	W	D	L	GF	GA	GD	Pts	Qualification or relegation
1	SC Brühl	26	15	7	4	48	19	+29	37	Play-off to Nationalliga B
2	FC Rorschach	26	11	12	3	46	25	+21	34	Play-off to Nationalliga B
3	FC Tuggen	26	12	6	8	31	28	+3	30	
4	SC Veltheim	26	8	12	6	44	35	+9	28	
5	FC Red Star Zürich	26	10	7	9	41	26	+15	27	
6	FC Young Fellows Zürich	26	10	7	9	45	37	+8	27	
7	FC Kilchberg	26	10	6	10	35	35	0	26	
8	FC Kreuzlingen	26	8	10	8	42	43	−1	26	
9	FC Einsiedeln	26	8	9	9	28	33	−5	25	
10	FC Altstätten (St. Gallen)	26	8	8	10	37	34	+3	24	
11	FC Herisau	26	9	6	11	36	38	−2	24	
12	FC Vaduz	26	7	7	12	34	53	−19	21	Play-out against relegation
13	FC Landquart	26	6	6	14	24	56	−32	18	Relegation to 2. Liga Interregional
14	FC Wohlen	26	6	5	15	31	60	−29	17	Relegation to 2. Liga Interregional

Source: RSSSF
Rules for classification: 1) Points; 2) Goal difference within the league, but decider play-off for qualifiers.

== Promotion play-off ==
=== Qualification round ===
Team 1	Score	Team 2
FC Münsingen	0–0	Urania Genève Sport
Urania Genève Sport	2–0	FC Münsingen

Urania Genève Sport win 2–0 on aggregate and continue to the finals.

Team 1	Score	Team 2
Concordia/Folgore Lausanne	1–1	FC Thun
FC Thun	0–2	Concordia/Folgore Lausanne

Concordia/Folgore Lausanne win 2–0 on aggregate and continue to the finals.

Team 1	Score	Team 2
SC Burgdorf	4–0	SC Brühl
SC Brühl	1–0	SC Burgdorf

SC Burgdorf win 4–1 on aggregate and continue to the finals.

Team 1	Score	Team 2
FC Rorschach	1–1	SC Kriens
SC Kriens	2–1	FC Rorschach

SC Kriens win 3–2 on aggregate and continue to the finals.

=== Final round ===
Team 1	Score	Team 2
SC Burgdorf	2–0	SC Kriens
SC Kriens	3–4	SC Burgdorf

SC Burgdorf win 6–3 on aggregate and are promoted to Nationalliga B.

Team 1	Score	Team 2
Urania Genève Sport	3–3	Concordia/Folgore Lausanne
Concordia/Folgore Lausanne	1–4	Urania Genève Sport

Urania Genève Sport win 7–4 on aggregate and are promoted to Nationalliga B.

=== Decider for third place ===
The play-off for the third promotion place was played on 16 June 1990 in Châtel-St-Denis.

Team 1	Score	Team 2
Concordia/Folgore Lausanne	3–2	SC Kriens

Concordia/Folgore Lausanne win, but refused promotion, so SC Kriens are promoted to Nationalliga B.

=== Decider for championship ===
The play-off for the 1. Liga championship was played on 16 June 1990 in Châtel-St-Denis.

Team 1	Score	Team 2
Urania Genève Sport	7–1	SC Burgdorf

Urania Genève Sport win and become 1. Liga champions.

== Relegation play-out ==
=== First round ===
Team 1	Score	Team 2
FC Breitenbach	3–3 a.e.t. 4–3 pen.	FC Raron

FC Raron continue to the final.

Team 1	Score	Team 2
FC Riehen	2–2 a.e.t. 4–3 pen.	FC Vaduz

FC Vaduz continue to the final.

=== Final round ===
Team 1	Score	Team 2
FC Vaduz	0–1	FC Raron
FC Raron	3–3	FC Vaduz

FC Raron win 4–3 on aggregate and remain in the division. FC Vaduz are relegated to 2. Liga.

== Further in Swiss football ==
- 1989–90 Nationalliga A
- 1989–90 Nationalliga B
- 1989–90 Swiss Cup

== Sources ==
- Switzerland 1989–90 at RSSSF

Preceded by 1988–89	Seasons in Swiss 1. Liga	Succeeded by 1990–91
