= 1987–88 Nationalliga A =

Swiss football season

Nationalliga A
- Season: 1987–88
- Champions: Xamax (3rd title)
- Relegated: Basel; Zürich
- Top goalscorer: John Eriksen; Servette (36 goals)

Nationalliga B
- Season: 1987–88
- Champions: No team was declared champions
- Promoted: Wettingen; Lugano
- Relegated: FC Solothurn; FC Olten; Vevey Sports
- Top goalscorer: n/a

Statistics of the Swiss National League in the 1987–88 football season, both Nationalliga A and Nationalliga B.

== Overview ==
There had been modifications to the Swiss Football Association (ASF/SFV) in advance of this season and the format of the Swiss Football League (Nationalliga) was changed accordingly. Until last season, there had been 32 member clubs in the association, divided into two tiers of 16 teams each. Now the number of clubs had now been increased to 36. As of this season there were 12 teams in the top-tier, the Nationalliga A (NLA). There were 24 teams in the second-tier, Nationalliga B (NLB), and these were divided into two groups, a West and an East group.

The season was divided into two stages. In the first stage, the qualification phase, each team in each group played a double round-robin to decide their table positions. The top eight teams from the qualification phase of the NLA would advance to the championship group. The last four teams would play against relegation, this against the top six teams in each group of the NLB who were also qualified to play in two promotion/relegation groups.

Therefore, in the second stage the divisions were divided again. The top eight teams from the NLA qualification competed a double round-robin in the championship group to decide championship and over the qualification slots to next season's UEFA European competitions. The bottom four teams from the NLA qualification and the top six teams from both of the NLB qualification groups were drawn into two promotion/relegation groups (NLA/NLB). The top two teams in each of these groups would play the following season in the NLA, the others would contest in the NLB. There were also two relegation groups (NLB/1. Liga), each group with six teams. The last team in each NLB relegation group was to be relegated directly to the 1. Liga and the two fifth placed teams from each group played a play-out against relegation to decide the third relegation slot.

== Nationalliga A ==
=== Qualification phase ===
The qualification stage of the NLA began on 8 August 1987 and was completed on 13 December. The top eight teams in the qualification phase would advance to the championship group and the last four teams would play against relegation.

==== Table ====
Pos	Team	Pld	W	D	L	GF	GA	GD	Pts	Qualification
1	Xamax	22	13	5	4	53	28	+25	44	Advance to championship round halved points (rounded up) as bonus
2	Grasshopper Club	22	12	6	4	30	16	+14	42	Advance to championship round halved points (rounded up) as bonus
3	Young Boys	22	7	12	3	37	28	+9	33	Advance to championship round halved points (rounded up) as bonus
4	Aarau	22	9	7	6	28	24	+4	34	Advance to championship round halved points (rounded up) as bonus
5	St. Gallen	22	9	5	8	28	27	+1	32	Advance to championship round halved points (rounded up) as bonus
6	Luzern	22	7	9	6	30	29	+1	30	Advance to championship round halved points (rounded up) as bonus
7	Servette	22	8	7	7	32	31	+1	31	Advance to championship round halved points (rounded up) as bonus
8	Lausanne-Sport	22	8	7	7	39	39	0	31	Advance to championship round halved points (rounded up) as bonus
9	Sion	22	8	6	8	42	36	+6	30	Continue to promotion/relegation round
10	Bellinzona	22	3	8	11	25	38	−13	17	Continue to promotion/relegation round
11	Basel	22	4	5	13	27	55	−28	17	Continue to promotion/relegation round
12	Zürich	22	4	3	15	26	46	−20	15	Continue to promotion/relegation round

Source: rsssf.com
Rules for classification: 1) Points; 2) Goal difference; 3) Goals scored; 4) Head-to-head points; 5) Away goals scored; 6) Draw.

==== Results ====
Home \ Away	AAR	BAS	BEL	GCZ	LS	NX	LUZ	SER	SIO	STG	YB	ZÜR
Aarau		2–0	0–0	3–0	3–0	0–2	1–3	1–0	2–0	2–1	1–1	2–2
Basel	0–1		1–1	0–1	1–2	1–2	3–3	0–0	3–1	2–1	1–4	5–4
Bellinzona	2–2	2–2		0–1	4–0	3–1	0–0	1–1	2–4	0–1	0–2	1–2
Grasshopper Club	2–1	5–1	3–0		3–0	2–0	1–1	2–0	1–0	0–0	0–0	1–0
Lausanne-Sport	4–1	5–0	0–1	0–0		2–2	3–1	4–2	4–4	4–0	2–0	3–1
Xamax	1–1	9–1	2–1	2–1	3–0		2–1	4–1	3–0	3–1	2–2	5–2
Luzern	0–2	2–0	1–1	2–1	2–2	1–0		1–1	1–1	2–0	1–1	1–0
Servette	2–0	4–0	3–1	3–1	1–1	3–1	2–2		1–1	3–1	1–1	2–1
Sion	1–1	3–1	4–1	1–2	5–2	2–2	3–1	4–1		4–0	1–1	2–0
St. Gallen	0–0	2–0	2–0	0–0	0–0	1–3	2–0	3–0	2–0		2–0	4–1
Young Boys	1–2	1–1	2–2	2–2	5–1	2–2	3–1	1–0	2–1	2–2		1–1
Zürich	2–0	0–4	4–2	0–1	0–0	0–2	0–3	0–1	3–0	1–3	2–3	

Source: rsssf.com
Legend: Blue = home team win; Yellow = draw; Red = away team win.

=== Championship group ===
The first eight teams from the qualification phase competed in the Championship round. The teams took half of the points (rounded up to complete units) gained in the qualification as bonus with them.

==== Final league table ====
Pos	Team	Pld	W	D	L	GF	GA	GD	BP	Pts	Qualification
1	Xamax	14	6	4	4	29	19	+10	16	32	Swiss champions, qualified for 1988–89 European Cup
2	Servette	14	7	4	3	38	23	+15	12	30	Qualified for 1988–89 UEFA Cup
3	Aarau	14	6	5	3	24	17	+7	13	30	Qualified for 1988–89 UEFA Cup and entered 1988 Intertoto Cup
4	Grasshopper Club	14	6	3	5	23	21	+2	15	30	Swiss Cup winners, qualified for 1988–89 Cup Winners' Cup and entered 1988 Intertoto Cup
5	Luzern	14	5	5	4	19	19	0	12	27	Entered 1989 Intertoto Cup
6	St. Gallen	14	4	3	7	16	25	−9	12	23	
7	Lausanne-Sport	14	3	5	6	18	30	−12	12	23	
8	Young Boys	14	4	1	9	18	31	−13	13	22	Entered 1989 Intertoto Cup

Source: rsssf.com
Rules for classification: 1) Points; 2) Goal difference; 3) Goals scored; 4) Head-to-head points; 5) Away goals scored; 6) Draw.

==== Results ====
Home \ Away	AAR	GCZ	LS	LUZ	NX	SER	STG	YB
Aarau		2–2	3–1	3–1	2–2	2–2	1–0	3–1
Grasshopper Club	2–1		3–1	1–2	1–0	3–3	4–1	3–0
Lausanne-Sport	0–0	1–2		4–2	1–3	2–2	2–1	2–1
Luzern	0–0	2–1	1–1		1–1	2–0	0–0	3–0
Xamax	2–0	4–0	6–1	1–1		2–4	2–0	3–2
Servette	1–5	1–0	4–0	1–2	3–3		4–1	6–0
St. Gallen	2–0	1–1	1–1	4–2	2–0	0–2		2–1
Young Boys	1–2	2–0	1–1	2–0	1–0	1–5	5–1	

Source: rsssf.com
Legend: Blue = home team win; Yellow = draw; Red = away team win.

== Attendances ==
#	Club	Average attendance	Highest attendance
1	Xamax	12,456	21,500
2	Aarau	9,272	13,300
3	Luzern	8,828	15,900
4	St. Gallen	8,756	13,500
5	Young Boys	8,019	13,500
6	Servette	6,761	15,000
7	Lausanne	6,483	16,000
8	Sion	6,422	11,000
9	GCZ	6,417	27,500
10	Basel	4,978	10,000
11	Zürich	3,928	11,800
12	Bellinzona	3,694	10,800

== Nationalliga B ==
=== Qualification phase ===
The qualification of the NLB began on 5 August 1987 and was completed by 13 December. The top six teams in each group were qualified to play in the two promotion/relegation groups. The bottom six teams in each group then played in newly drawn groups against relegation. Three teams were to be relegated.

==== Table group East ====
Pos	Team	Pld	W	D	L	GF	GA	GD	Pts	Qualification
1	Lugano	22	16	3	3	74	28	+46	51	Advance to promotion round
2	FC Wettingen	22	15	3	4	53	16	+37	48	Advance to promotion round
3	FC Locarno	22	14	5	3	47	29	+18	47	Advance to promotion round
4	FC Schaffhausen	22	11	5	6	48	31	+17	38	Advance to promotion round
5	FC Chiasso	22	10	7	5	34	28	+6	37	Advance to promotion round
6	BSC Old Boys	22	10	3	9	35	36	−1	33	Advance to promotion round
7	SC Zug	22	8	4	10	32	40	−8	28	Continue in relegation round
8	FC Winterthur	22	6	8	8	28	44	−16	26	Continue in relegation round
9	FC Chur	22	5	6	11	27	39	−12	21	Continue in relegation round
10	FC Olten	22	3	5	14	24	52	−28	14	Continue in relegation round
11	FC Solothurn	22	3	4	15	26	56	−30	13	Continue in relegation round
12	FC Baden	22	3	3	16	23	52	−29	12	Continue in relegation round

Source: rsssf.com
Rules for classification: 1) Points; 2) Goal difference; 3) Goals scored; 4) Head-to-head points; 5) Away goals scored; 6) Draw.

==== Table group West ====
Pos	Team	Pld	W	D	L	GF	GA	GD	Pts	Qualification
1	Etoile Carouge FC	22	14	2	6	54	34	+20	44	Advance to promotion round
2	FC Grenchen	22	12	5	5	56	25	+31	41	Advance to promotion round
3	FC Bulle	22	13	3	6	43	29	+14	42	Advance to promotion round
4	CS Chênois	22	11	6	5	45	29	+16	39	Advance to promotion round
5	ES FC Malley	22	11	5	6	50	35	+15	38	Advance to promotion round
6	FC Martigny-Sports	22	8	8	6	29	31	−2	32	Advance to promotion round
7	Yverdon-Sport FC	22	10	4	8	36	43	−7	34	Continue in relegation round
8	FC Biel-Bienne	22	5	9	8	38	48	−10	24	Continue in relegation round
9	Vevey Sports	22	6	4	12	34	53	−19	22	Continue in relegation round
10	FC Renens	22	4	6	12	34	47	−13	18	Continue in relegation round
11	FC Montreux-Sports	22	4	5	13	27	49	−22	17	Continue in relegation round
12	FC La Chaux-de-Fonds	22	5	1	16	24	47	−23	16	Continue in relegation round

Source: rsssf.com
Rules for classification: 1) Points; 2) Goal difference; 3) Goals scored; 4) Head-to-head points; 5) Away goals scored; 6) Draw.

=== Promotion/relegation round ===
The promotion/relegation stage began on 5 March 1988 and was completed by 23 May.

==== Table group A ====
Pos	Team	Pld	W	D	L	GF	GA	GD	Pts	Qualification
1	Wettingen	14	11	0	3	32	16	+16	22	Promotion to Nationalliga A 1988–89
2	Bellinzona	14	8	1	5	29	20	+9	17	Remain in Nationalliga A 1988–89
3	FC Schaffhausen	14	7	1	6	25	22	+3	15	Remain in Nationalliga B 1988–89
4	ES Malley	14	7	1	6	21	20	+1	15	Remain in Nationalliga B 1988–89
5	Basel	14	5	4	5	27	20	+7	14	Relegation to Nationalliga B1988–89
6	Bulle	14	7	0	7	28	25	+3	14	Remain in Nationalliga B 1988–89
7	Etoile Carouge	14	4	1	9	14	33	−19	9	Remain in Nationalliga B 1988–89
8	Old Boys	14	2	2	10	11	31	−20	6	Remain in Nationalliga B 1988–89

Source: rsssf.com
Rules for classification: 1) Points; 2) Goal difference; 3) Goals scored; 4) Head-to-head points; 5) Away goals scored; 6) Draw.

==== Results ====
Home \ Away	BAS	BEL	BUL	ÉTO	MAL	OBB	SHA	WET
Basel		0–2	1–2	4–0	1–0	1–1	4–1	0–2
Bellinzona	4–1		5–1	1–1	3–4	2–0	1–0	2–1
Bulle	0–2	1–0		5–0	2–1	4–1	3–4	0–3
Étoile Carouge	0–6	3–1	0–3		2–3	2–0	3–2	2–4
Malley	2–2	0–3	1–0	2–0		4–0	0–3	1–0
Old Boys Basel	3–3	0–1	1–4	0–1	0–1		2–1	0–4
Schaffhausen	0–0	4–2	3–1	1–0	2–1	1–2		1–2
Wettingen	3–2	4–2	3–2	1–0	2–1	2–1	1–2	

Legend: Blue = home team win; Yellow = draw; Red = away team win.

==== Table group B ====
Pos	Team	Pld	W	D	L	GF	GA	GD	Pts	Qualification
1	Lugano	14	13	0	1	47	15	+32	26	Promotion to Nationalliga A 1988–89
2	Sion	14	11	1	2	49	14	+35	23	Remain in Nationalliga A 1988–89
3	Grenchen	14	7	1	6	27	24	+3	15	Remain in Nationalliga B 1988–89
4	Chênois	14	6	2	6	21	30	−9	14	Remain in Nationalliga B 1988–89
5	Chiasso	14	5	1	8	21	34	−13	11	Remain in Nationalliga B 1988–89
6	Zürich	14	4	1	9	24	34	−10	9	Relegation to Nationalliga B 1988–89
7	Martigny-Sports	14	3	2	9	16	37	−21	8	Remain in Nationalliga B 1988–89
8	Locarno	14	1	4	9	16	33	−17	6	Remain in Nationalliga B 1988–89

Source: rsssf.com
Rules for classification: 1) Points; 2) Goal difference; 3) Goals scored; 4) Head-to-head points; 5) Away goals scored; 6) Draw.

==== Results ====
Home \ Away	CHÊ	CHI	GRE	LOC	LUG	MAR	SIO	ZÜR
Chênois		3–1	2–4	3–2	1–2	2–0	0–5	3–2
Chiasso	1–0		2–1	1–1	1–5	4–1	1–2	5–3
Grenchen	4–1	2–0		3–0	1–4	1–1	5–1	3–2
Locarno	1–1	2–3	2–1		3–4	1–2	0–1	0–0
Lugano	5–0	3–0	2–0	5–2		6–0	3–2	2–1
Martigny-Sports	1–2	5–0	0–2	0–0	1–4		0–3	4–1
Sion	1–1	3–0	5–0	6–1	3–0	8–0		6–1
Zürich	1–2	3–2	2–0	3–1	0–2	3–1	2–3	

Legend: Blue = home team win; Yellow = draw; Red = away team win.

=== Relegation round NLB/1. Liga ===
The last six teams in each of the two qualification phase groups competed in two relegation groups against relegation to the 1. Liga 1988–89. There was to be one direct relegation in each group, plus a play-out against relegation between both second last placed teams. This stage began on 19 March 1988 and was completed on 24 May.

==== Table group A ====
Pos	Team	Pld	W	D	L	GF	GA	GD	Pts	Qualification
1	FC La Chaux-de-Fonds	10	6	3	1	15	11	+4	15	Remain in NLB 1989–90
2	SC Zug	10	4	2	4	17	12	+5	10	Remain in NLB 1989–90
3	FC Biel-Bienne	10	4	2	4	11	11	0	10	Remain in NLB 1989–90
4	FC Chur	10	1	7	2	7	8	−1	9	Remain in NLB 1989–90
5	FC Renens	10	3	2	5	12	15	−3	8	Play-out against relegation
6	FC Solothurn	10	3	2	5	11	16	−5	8	Relegated to 1989–90 1. Liga

Source: rsssf.com
Rules for classification: 1) Points; 2) Goal difference; 3) Goals scored; 4) Head-to-head points; 5) Away goals scored; 6) Draw.

==== Table group B ====
Pos	Team	Pld	W	D	L	GF	GA	GD	Pts	Qualification
1	Yverdon-Sport FC	10	4	4	2	19	12	+7	12	Remain in NLB 1989–90
2	FC Winterthur	10	4	3	3	14	10	+4	11	Remain in NLB 1989–90
3	FC Baden	10	3	4	3	17	15	+2	10	Remain in NLB 1989–90
4	FC Montreux-Sports	10	4	2	4	10	11	−1	10	Remain in NLB 1989–90
5	Vevey Sports	10	3	3	4	12	13	−1	9	Play-out against relegation
6	FC Olten	10	2	4	4	12	23	−11	8	Relegated to 1989–90 1. Liga

Source: rsssf.com
Rules for classification: 1) Points; 2) Goal difference; 3) Goals scored; 4) Head-to-head points; 5) Away goals scored; 6) Draw.

==== Decider against relegation ====
The decider was played on in .

Team 1	Score	Team 2
FC Renens	1–1	Vevey Sports
Vevey Sports	1–3	FC Renens

FC Renens won 4–2 on aggregate and remain in the division. Vevey Sports are relegated to 2. Liga Interregional.

== Further in Swiss football ==
- 1987–88 Swiss Cup
- 1987–88 Swiss 1. Liga

== Sources ==
- Switzerland 1987–88 at RSSSF

Preceded by 1986–87	Nationalliga seasons in Switzerland	Succeeded by 1988–89
