= 1988–89 Nationalliga A =

Swiss football season

Nationalliga A
- Season: 1988–89
- Champions: Luzern
- Relegated: None
- Top goalscorer: Karl-Heinz Rummenigge; Servette (18 goals)

Nationalliga B
- Season: 1988–89
- Champions: No team was declared champions
- Promoted: None
- Relegated: FC Renens; Urania Genève Sport; FC Biel-Bienne
- Top goalscorer: n/a

Statistics of the Swiss National League in the 1988–89 football season, both Nationalliga A and Nationalliga B.

== Overview ==
The 36 clubs of the Swiss Football League (Nationalliga) were divided into two tiers. In the top-tier, there were 12 teams that played in the Nationalliga A (NLA). There were 24 teams in the Nationalliga B (NLB), the second tier, these were divided into two groups, a West and an East group. Each team in each group played a double round-robin in the qualification phase. Thereafter the divisions were divided into a Swiss championship group with the top eight teams from the qualification and two promotion/relegation groups (NLA/NLB), both with eight teams. These were the bottom four teams from the NLA qualification and the top six teams from both of the NLB qualification groups. Further, there were two relegation groups (NLB/1. Liga), each group with six teams. The last team in each NLB relegation group were to be relegated directly and the two fifth placed teams in each group played a play-out against relegation to decide the third relegation slot.

== Nationalliga A ==
=== Qualification phase ===
The qualification stage of the NLA began on 23 July 1988 and was completed on 11 December. The top eight teams in the qualification phase would advance to the championship group and the last four teams would play against relegation.

==== Table ====
Pos	Team	Pld	W	D	L	GF	GA	GD	Pts	Qualification
1	Luzern	22	10	8	4	27	25	+2	28	Advance to championship round halved points (rounded up) as bonus
2	Grasshopper Club	22	10	7	5	41	29	+12	27	Advance to championship round halved points (rounded up) as bonus
3	Bellinzona	22	9	7	6	34	27	+7	25	Advance to championship round halved points (rounded up) as bonus
4	Sion	22	8	8	6	25	21	+4	24	Advance to championship round halved points (rounded up) as bonus
5	Wettingen	22	5	14	3	23	21	+2	24	Advance to championship round halved points (rounded up) as bonus
6	Young Boys	22	8	7	7	45	36	+9	23	Advance to championship round halved points (rounded up) as bonus
7	Xamax	22	7	9	6	39	33	+6	23	Advance to championship round halved points (rounded up) as bonus
8	Servette	22	8	6	8	39	34	+5	22	Advance to championship round halved points (rounded up) as bonus
9	Aarau	22	5	8	9	27	29	−2	18	Continue to promotion/relegation round
10	Lausanne-Sport	22	5	8	9	27	34	−7	18	Continue to promotion/relegation round
11	St. Gallen	22	5	6	11	29	44	−15	16	Continue to promotion/relegation round
12	Lugano	22	3	10	9	23	46	−23	16	Continue to promotion/relegation round

Source: rsssf.com
Rules for classification: 1) Points; 2) Goal difference; 3) Goals scored; 4) Head-to-head points; 5) Away goals scored; 6) Draw.

==== Results ====
Home \ Away	AAR	BEL	GCZ	LS	LUG	LUZ	NX	SER	SIO	STG	WET	YB
Aarau		2–1	1–2	1–1	2–2	1–1	1–1	2–2	4–1	5–0	0–2	2–1
Bellinzona	1–0		2–1	1–1	0–0	3–1	2–1	4–0	0–2	1–1	1–1	3–0
Grasshopper	1–0	2–2		3–2	3–0	4–1	2–2	4–0	1–0	3–0	2–0	2–2
Lausanne-Sport	0–2	2–2	0–2		4–0	0–0	2–4	1–4	1–1	2–1	1–2	1–4
Lugano	2–1	0–2	2–2	0–2		3–3	1–0	1–6	0–3	3–1	0–0	1–1
Luzern	1–0	2–1	2–0	0–0	2–1		1–0	1–1	2–1	3–2	2–2	1–3
Neuchâtel Xamax	1–1	2–2	4–0	0–2	5–1	0–0		2–1	3–1	3–1	2–2	2–5
Servette	1–0	2–3	2–1	1–1	1–1	0–1	0–1		0–1	7–1	1–1	3–2
Sion	2–0	0–2	0–0	1–0	0–0	3–0	1–1	2–1		2–2	2–0	1–1
St. Gallen	2–2	2–0	2–2	1–2	4–1	0–1	3–3	0–1	2–0		2–1	2–0
Wettingen	0–0	1–0	1–1	1–1	1–1	0–0	2–0	2–2	1–1	0–0		1–1
Young Boys	4–0	4–1	4–3	3–1	3–3	0–2	2–2	2–3	0–0	2–0	1–2	

Legend: Blue = home team win; Yellow = draw; Red = away team win.

=== Championship group ===
The first eight teams of the qualification phase competed in the Championship round. The teams took half of the points (rounded up to complete units) gained in the qualification as bonus with them.

==== Final league table ====
Pos	Team	Pld	W	D	L	GF	GA	GD	BP	Pts	Qualification
1	Luzern	14	7	5	2	17	11	+6	14	33	Swiss champions, qualified for 1989–90 European Cup and entered 1989 Intertoto Cup
2	Grasshopper Club	14	7	2	5	20	18	+2	14	30	Swiss Cup winners, qualified for 1989–90 Cup Winners' Cup and entered 1989 Intertoto Cup
3	Sion	14	6	5	3	22	15	+7	12	29	Qualified for 1989–90 UEFA Cup
4	Wettingen	14	7	2	5	22	14	+8	12	28	Qualified for 1989–90 UEFA Cup and entered 1989 Intertoto Cup
5	Young Boys	14	6	3	5	36	22	+14	12	27	
6	Xamax	14	4	3	7	23	26	−3	12	23	
7	Bellinzona	14	2	4	8	9	26	−17	13	21	Entered 1989 Intertoto Cup
8	Servette	14	3	4	7	25	42	−17	11	21	

Source: rsssf.com
Rules for classification: 1) points; 2) Position in the qualification.

==== Results ====
Home \ Away	BEL	GCZ	LUZ	NX	SER	SIO	WET	YB
Bellinzona		0–0	0–0	0–0	2–5	1–0	0–1	3–0
Grasshopper	2–0		2–1	2–1	6–1	2–1	2–1	1–4
Luzern	1–1	1–0		2–0	1–0	1–0	1–0	3–3
Neuchâtel Xamax	3–0	0–1	0–1		6–3	2–2	1–2	3–2
Servette	4–2	2–2	2–2	3–2		1–1	0–0	0–2
Sion	1–0	2–0	1–1	2–2	3–2		2–1	3–0
Wettingen	3–0	2–0	1–0	1–2	6–2	0–2		3–1
Young Boys	6–0	2–0	1–2	5–1	7–0	2–2	1–1	

Legend: Blue = home team win; Yellow = draw; Red = away team win.

== Nationalliga B ==
=== Qualification phase ===
The qualification of the NLB began on 23 July 1988 and was completed by 11 December. The top six teams in each group were qualified to play in the two promotion/relegation groups. The bottom six teams in each group then played in newly drawn groups against relegation.

==== Table group East ====
Pos	Team	Pld	W	D	L	GF	GA	GD	Pts	Qualification
1	Basel	22	14	4	4	48	23	+25	32	Advance to promotion round
2	Locarno	22	12	6	4	58	28	+30	30	Advance to promotion round
3	Zürich	22	11	8	3	62	32	+30	30	Advance to promotion round
4	Baden	22	10	4	8	44	29	+15	24	Advance to promotion round
5	Old Boys	22	10	4	8	37	29	+8	24	Advance to promotion round
6	Chiasso	22	8	8	6	35	33	+2	24	Advance to promotion round
7	FC Schaffhausen	22	9	6	7	32	36	−4	24	Continue in relegation round
8	Winterthur	22	8	6	8	39	36	+3	22	Continue in relegation round
9	Emmenbrücke	22	7	5	10	31	41	−10	19	Continue in relegation round
10	Chur	22	4	8	10	27	54	−27	16	Continue in relegation round
11	SC Zug	22	3	5	14	14	47	−33	11	Continue in relegation round
12	FC Glarus	22	2	4	16	19	58	−39	8	Continue in relegation round

Source: rsssf.com
Rules for classification: 1) Points; 2) Goal difference; 3) Goals scored; 4) Head-to-head points; 5) Away goals scored; 6) Draw.

==== Table group West ====
Pos	Team	Pld	W	D	L	GF	GA	GD	Pts	Qualification
1	Yverdon-Sport FC	22	13	7	2	51	25	+26	33	Advance to promotion round
2	FC Grenchen	22	14	2	6	51	23	+28	30	Advance to promotion round
3	Etoile Carouge FC	22	12	4	6	45	32	+13	28	Advance to promotion round
4	ES FC Malley	22	11	5	6	39	29	+10	27	Advance to promotion round
5	FC Bulle	22	11	4	7	49	25	+24	26	Advance to promotion round
6	CS Chênois	22	11	3	8	29	28	+1	25	Advance to promotion round
7	Urania Genève Sport	22	7	7	8	39	34	+5	21	Continue in relegation round
8	FC Renens	22	7	5	10	28	36	−8	19	Continue in relegation round
9	FC La Chaux-de-Fonds	22	6	6	10	26	37	−11	18	Continue in relegation round
10	FC Martigny-Sports	22	5	6	11	29	48	−19	16	Continue in relegation round
11	FC Montreux-Sports	22	3	5	14	31	61	−30	11	Continue in relegation round
12	FC Biel-Bienne	22	3	4	15	30	69	−39	10	Continue in relegation round

Source: rsssf.com
Rules for classification: 1) Points; 2) Goal difference; 3) Goals scored; 4) Head-to-head points; 5) Away goals scored; 6) Draw.

=== Promotion/relegation round NLA/NLB ===
The promotion/relegation stage began on 18 March 1989 and was completed by 7 June.

==== Table group A ====
Pos	Team	Pld	W	D	L	GF	GA	GD	Pts	Qualification
1	FC St. Gallen	14	10	3	1	30	13	+17	23	Remain in Nationalliga A 1989–90
2	Lausanne Sports	14	9	4	1	42	8	+34	22	Remain in Nationalliga A 1989–90
3	FC Zürich	14	6	2	6	29	23	+6	14	Remain in Nationalliga B
4	FC Basel	14	4	6	4	19	21	−2	14	Remain in Nationalliga B
5	CS Chênois	14	4	4	6	22	29	−7	12	Remain in Nationalliga B
6	FC Grenchen	14	3	4	7	17	26	−9	10	Remain in Nationalliga B
7	ES Malley	14	2	6	6	15	29	−14	10	Remain in Nationalliga B
8	BSC Old Boys Basel	14	3	1	10	13	38	−25	7	Remain in Nationalliga B

Source: rsssf.com
Rules for classification: 1) Points; 2) Goal difference; 3) Goals scored; 4) Head-to-head points; 5) Away goals scored; 6) Draw.

==== Results ====
Home \ Away	BAS	CHÊ	GRE	LS	MAL	OBB	STG	ZÜR
Basel		1–1	2–1	1–1	1–1	0–1	2–3	1–1
Chênois	2–2		3–3	0–3	3–0	1–2	0–2	2–0
Grenchen	2–2	0–0		0–3	2–4	2–0	0–1	2–0
Lausanne-Sport	4–1	6–1	5–0		1–1	6–0	0–1	6–1
Malley	1–2	1–3	1–0	1–1		1–1	1–1	0–1
Old Boys Basel	0–2	1–4	2–3	0–3	3–1		0–2	1–6
St. Gallen	3–0	5–2	1–1	0–2	1–1	5–1		2–1
Zürich	0–2	3–0	2–1	1–1	9–1	2–1	2–3	

Legend: Blue = home team win; Yellow = draw; Red = away team win.

==== Table group B ====
Pos	Team	Pld	W	D	L	GF	GA	GD	Pts	Qualification
1	AC Lugano	14	10	3	1	29	10	+19	23	Remain in Nationalliga A 1989–90
2	FC Aarau	14	11	1	2	24	9	+15	23	Remain in Nationalliga A 1989–90
3	FC Locarno	14	6	3	5	22	16	+6	15	Remain in Nationalliga B
4	FC Baden	14	6	3	5	22	24	−2	15	Remain in Nationalliga B
5	Yverdon-Sport FC	14	4	6	4	9	9	0	14	Remain in Nationalliga B
6	FC Bulle	14	3	3	8	19	28	−9	9	Remain in Nationalliga B
7	FC Chiasso	14	0	7	7	15	30	−15	7	Remain in Nationalliga B
8	Étoile Carouge FC	14	1	4	9	8	22	−14	6	Remain in Nationalliga B

Source: rsssf.com
Rules for classification: 1) Points; 2) Goal difference; 3) Goals scored; 4) Head-to-head points; 5) Away goals scored; 6) Draw.

==== Results ====
Home \ Away	AAR	BAD	BUL	CHI	ÉTO	LOC	LUG	YS
Aarau		1–1	1–0	4–0	1–0	1–0	1–4	2–0
Baden	0–3		4–1	5–3	3–0	1–0	1–2	0–0
Bulle	1–2	2–0		2–2	1–1	0–3	4–2	0–2
Chiasso	0–3	1–2	2–3		1–1	1–4	0–1	1–1
Étoile Carouge	0–1	1–1	2–1	1–1		1–2	1–5	0–1
Locarno	0–2	6–3	3–2	2–2	1–0		0–0	0–0
Lugano	3–1	4–0	3–1	0–0	1–0	2–1		2–0
Yverdon-Sport	0–1	0–1	1–1	1–1	2–0	1–0	0–0	

Legend: Blue = home team win; Yellow = draw; Red = away team win.

=== Relegation round NLB/1. Liga ===
The last six teams in each of the two qualification phase groups competed in two relegation groups against relegation to the 1. Liga 1991–92. There was to be one direct relegation in each group, plus a play-out against relegation between both second last placed teams. This stage began on 23 March and was completed on 27 May.

==== Table group A ====
Pos	Team	Pld	W	D	L	GF	GA	GD	Pts	Qualification
1	FC Schaffhausen	10	5	3	2	17	13	+4	13	Remain in NLB 1989–90
2	SC Zug	10	3	5	2	20	13	+7	11	Remain in NLB 1989–90
3	FC Martigny-Sports	10	4	3	3	18	23	−5	11	Remain in NLB 1989–90
4	FC Emmenbrücke	10	4	2	4	23	18	+5	10	Remain in NLB 1989–90
5	FC Biel-Bienne	10	3	2	5	16	18	−2	8	Play-out against relegation
6	FC Renens	10	2	3	5	12	21	−9	7	Relegated to 1989–90 1. Liga

Source: rsssf.com
Rules for classification: 1) Points; 2) Goal difference; 3) Goals scored; 4) Head-to-head points; 5) Away goals scored; 6) Draw.

==== Table group B ====
Pos	Team	Pld	W	D	L	GF	GA	GD	Pts	Qualification
1	FC Glarus	10	7	1	2	16	9	+7	15	Remain in NLB 1989–90
2	FC Winterthur	10	5	2	3	19	11	+8	12	Remain in NLB 1989–90
3	FC Montreux-Sports	10	5	1	4	14	15	−1	11	Remain in NLB 1989–90
4	FC La Chaux-de-Fonds	10	3	3	4	11	13	−2	9	Remain in NLB 1989–90
5	FC Chur	10	1	5	4	13	16	−3	7	Play-out against relegation
6	Urania Genève Sport	10	2	2	6	9	18	−9	6	Relegated to 1989–90 1. Liga

Source: rsssf.com
Rules for classification: 1) Points; 2) Goal difference; 3) Goals scored; 4) Head-to-head points; 5) Away goals scored; 6) Draw.

==== Relegation play-out ====
The two games of the two-legged play-out against relegation between both second last placed teams were played on 3 and 10 June 1989.

Team 1	Score	Team 2
FC Biel-Bienne	0–1	FC Chur
FC Chur	2–1	FC Biel-Bienne

FC Chur won 3–1 on aggregate and FC Biel-Bienne were relegated to 1989–90 1. Liga.

== Attendances ==
#	Club	Average
1	Luzern	12,439
2	Xamax	10,144
3	Sion	8,772
4	GCZ	7,494
5	St. Gallen	7,158
6	Young Boys	6,839
7	Aarau	5,511
8	Bellinzona	5,197
9	Servette	4,600
10	Wettingen	4,589
11	Lausanne	4,006
12	Lugano	3,778

== Further in Swiss football ==
- 1988–89 Swiss Cup
- 1988–89 Swiss 1. Liga

== Sources ==
- Switzerland 1988–89 at RSSSF

Preceded by 1987–88	Nationalliga seasons in Switzerland	Succeeded by 1989–90
