= 1986–87 Nationalliga A =

Swiss football season

Nationalliga A
- Season: 1986–87
- Champions: Xamax (2nd title)
- Relegated: Vevey Sports; Wettingen; Locarno; La Chaux-de-Fonds
- Top goalscorer: John Eriksen; Servette (28 goals)

Nationalliga B
- Season: 1986–87
- Champions: FC Grenchen
- Promoted: no team was promoted
- Relegated: SC Kriens
- Top goalscorer: n/a

Statistics of the Swiss National League in the 1986–87 football season, both Nationalliga A and Nationalliga B.

== Overview ==
There were 32 member clubs in the Swiss Football Association (ASF/SFV), divided into two tiers of 16 teams each. At the end of the season there would be changes in the ASF/SFV and to the format of the league. These modifications included increasing the number of members in the association by four clubs. It had also been decided to reduce the size of the top tier NLA by four teams and to increase the size of the second-tier NLB by eight teams.

In both divisions the teams played a double round-robin to decide their table positions. The Swiss champions would qualify for the 1987–88 European Cup, the runners-up and third placed team would qualify for the 1987–88 UEFA Cup. The last two placed teams in the NLA would be directly relegated. The four teams in eleventh to fourteenth position would compete a play-out round with the top four teams of the NLB to decide the last two slots in next season's NLA. The last four teams in the NLB would compete a play-off round against the top eight team of the 1. Liga to decide the final eight slots in next season's NLB.

== Nationalliga A ==
The first round was played on 9 August 1986. There was to be a winter break between 29 November and 28 February 1987. The season was completed on 12 June 1987.

=== Final league table ===
Pos	Team	Pld	W	D	L	GF	GA	GD	Pts	Qualification
1	Xamax	30	21	6	3	75	27	+48	48	Swiss champions qualified for 1987–88 European Cup
2	Grasshopper Club	30	19	5	6	60	36	+24	43	qualified for 1987–88 UEFA Cup and entered 1987 Intertoto Cup
3	Sion	30	17	8	5	76	38	+38	42	qualified for 1987–88 UEFA Cup
4	Servette	30	16	4	10	65	44	+21	36	
5	Luzern	30	12	12	6	55	38	+17	36	
6	Zürich	30	12	12	6	52	44	+8	36	
7	St. Gallen	30	14	6	10	50	43	+7	34	
8	Lausanne-Sport	30	13	6	11	64	60	+4	32	entered 1987 Intertoto Cup
9	Bellinzona	30	10	11	9	42	39	+3	31	entered 1987 Intertoto Cup
10	Young Boys	30	10	8	12	47	45	+2	28	Swiss Cup winners qualified for 1987–88 Cup Winners' Cup
11	Aarau	30	9	8	13	37	42	−5	26	To Promotion/relegation play-off NLA/NLB
12	Basel	30	9	6	15	49	62	−13	24	To Promotion/relegation play-off NLA/NLB
13	Vevey Sports	30	6	8	16	31	72	−41	20	To Promotion/relegation play-off NLA/NLB
14	Wettingen	30	6	7	17	31	48	−17	19	To Promotion/relegation play-off NLA/NLB
15	Locarno	30	6	7	17	44	65	−21	19	Relegated to 1987–88 Nationalliga B
16	La Chaux-de-Fonds	30	1	4	25	22	97	−75	6	Relegated to 1987–88 Nationalliga B and entered 1987 Intertoto Cup

Source: rsssf.com
Rules for classification: 1) Points; 2) Goal difference; 3) Goals scored; 4) Head-to-head points; 5) Away goals scored; 6) Draw.

=== Results ===
Home \ Away	AAR	BAS	BEL	CDF	GCZ	LS	LOC	LUZ	NX	SER	SIO	STG	VEV	WET	YB	ZÜR
Aarau		2–1	0–0	4–4	1–2	2–0	3–1	1–1	0–5	1–0	0–2	0–1	5–0	1–0	2–4	1–1
Basel	0–0		1–1	1–0	0–3	4–3	3–1	2–4	1–4	1–4	2–5	3–4	2–2	1–1	1–0	5–3
Bellinzona	0–0	1–0		5–1	0–2	4–2	2–2	3–0	0–3	1–1	3–0	2–0	3–1	0–0	2–5	1–2
Chaux-de-Fonds	0–0	0–2	3–1		1–2	1–2	0–1	1–1	0–1	0–4	0–3	1–6	0–2	0–4	0–2	1–3
Grasshopper	2–0	2–1	1–1	4–1		5–0	4–4	3–0	1–0	2–0	1–1	1–2	1–0	3–1	1–0	5–1
Lausanne-Sports	4–3	4–3	2–1	7–1	1–2		3–1	4–2	1–1	3–2	1–1	2–0	3–4	2–1	2–0	2–2
Locarno	0–1	3–5	0–0	5–0	0–2	5–1		2–2	0–2	2–1	1–4	0–0	1–1	2–3	4–1	1–1
Luzern	1–0	2–0	1–1	6–1	4–0	1–1	2–0		2–1	2–1	1–1	1–0	5–1	2–0	1–2	0–0
Neuchâtel Xamax	2–1	2–1	2–0	5–0	4–1	2–0	7–2	2–2		1–1	3–2	3–0	3–0	3–1	1–1	4–0
Servette	3–2	2–1	0–1	7–2	3–1	3–2	5–2	2–1	3–1		0–2	3–1	4–1	3–1	2–0	1–1
Sion	3–2	3–1	5–2	6–1	4–1	1–1	5–1	2–2	0–1	3–2		2–2	1–1	3–0	2–1	4–2
St. Gallen	3–1	0–0	1–1	6–1	2–2	3–1	1–0	0–0	0–2	2–0	0–4		2–0	2–0	2–0	2–1
Vevey-Sports	0–2	2–2	1–0	1–0	2–2	1–4	2–1	1–4	2–4	1–4	0–3	0–4		2–1	0–5	1–1
Wettingen	0–1	1–2	1–2	2–0	1–3	1–1	1–2	3–2	1–1	1–3	3–2	2–0	0–0		0–0	1–1
Young Boys	1–0	0–1	0–2	1–1	1–0	1–5	2–0	1–1	2–3	1–1	2–2	7–2	2–2	3–0		1–1
Zürich	1–1	3–2	2–2	3–1	0–1	2–0	1–0	2–2	2–2	4–0	1–0	3–2	3–0	1–0	4–1	

Source: rsssf.com
Legend: Blue = home team win; Yellow = draw; Red = away team win.

== Nationalliga B ==
The first round was played on 9 August 1986. There was to be a winter break between 30 November and 7 March 1987. The season was completed on 13 June 1987.

=== Final league table ===
Pos	Team	Pld	W	D	L	GF	GA	GD	Pts	Qualification
1	FC Grenchen	30	20	7	3	79	30	+49	47	NLB champions qualified to promotion/relegation play-off NLA/NLB
2	FC Lugano	30	17	8	5	76	30	+46	42	Qualified to promotion/relegation play-off NLA/NLB
3	FC Bulle	30	18	6	6	75	39	+36	42	Qualified to promotion/relegation play-off NLA/NLB
4	ES FC Malley	30	14	9	7	53	42	+11	37	Qualified to promotion/relegation play-off NLA/NLB
5	FC Baden	30	15	5	10	60	46	+14	35	
6	CS Chênois	30	13	8	9	66	57	+9	34	
7	FC Schaffhausen	30	13	7	10	54	55	−1	33	
8	FC Chiasso	30	9	9	12	39	49	−10	27	
9	SC Zug	30	7	12	11	32	44	−12	26	
10	FC Winterthur	30	7	11	12	37	41	−4	25	
11	FC Martigny-Sports	30	9	7	14	37	48	−11	25	
12	Etoile Carouge FC	30	9	7	14	36	52	−16	25	
13	FC Biel-Bienne	30	9	6	15	45	71	−26	24	To promotion/relegation play-off NLB/1. Liga
14	SC Kriens	30	7	9	14	40	58	−18	23	To promotion/relegation play-off NLB/1. Liga
15	FC Olten	30	7	4	19	36	68	−32	18	To promotion/relegation play-off NLB/1. Liga
16	FC Renens	30	6	5	19	34	69	−35	17	To promotion/relegation play-off NLB/1. Liga

Source: rsssf.com
Rules for classification: 1) Points; 2) Goal difference; 3) Goals scored; 4) Head-to-head points; 5) Away goals scored; 6) Draw.

== Promotion/relegation play-off NLA/NLB ==
The four teams in eleventh to fourteenth position in the NLA competed a two-legged play-off round with the top four teams of the NLB to decide the last two slots in next season's NLA. The qualification games were played on 20 and 23 June and the finals on 27 and 30 June.

=== Qualification round ===
Team 1	Score	Team 2
Aarau	3–1	ES Malley
ES Malley	0–6	Aarau

Aarau win 9–1 on aggregate and continue to the finals. ES Malley remain in the NLB.

Team 1	Score	Team 2
Basel	2–2	Bulle
Bulle	2–2 (p. 3–5)	Basel

Basel win in the penalty shoot-out and continue to the finals. Bulle remain in the NLB.

Team 1	Score	Team 2
Vevey Sports	1–1	Lugano
Lugano	1–0	Vevey Sports

FC Lugano win 2–1 on aggregate and continue to the finals. Vevey Sports are relegated to 1987–88 Nationalliga B.

Team 1	Score	Team 2
Grenchen	0–0	Wettingen
Wettingen	4–0	Grenchen

Wettingen win 4–0 on aggregate and continue to the finals. FC Grenchen remain in the NLB.

=== Final round ===
Team 1	Score	Team 2
Wettingen	2–1	Basel
Basel	7–0	Wettingen

Basel win 8–2 on aggregate and remain in the NLA. Wettingen are relegated to 1987–88 Nationalliga B

Team 1	Score	Team 2
Aarau	5–0	Lugano
Lugano	1–0	Aarau

Aarau win 5–1 on aggregate and remain in the NLA. Lugano remain in the NLB.

== Promotion/relegation play-off NLB/1. Liga ==
=== First stage ===
The four 1. Liga group winners had played the first stage against the four runners-up. The winners of those four games had achieved promotion.

=== Final stage ===
The four losing teams from the first stage played a two legged match against one of the four last placed teams from the NLB. The winners of these matches, that were played on 21 and 28 June, would play in the second tier, NLB, next season. The losers would play in the third tier, 1.Liga.

Team 1	Score	Team 2
FC Altstätten	2–2	FC Olten
FC Olten	2–1	FC Altstätten

FC Olten win 4–3 on aggregate and remain in the 1987–88 Nationalliga B. FC Altstätten remain in the division for the 1987–88 Swiss 1. Liga season.

Team 1	Score	Team 2
FC Bern	3–2	FC Biel-Bienne
FC Biel-Bienne	5–2 a.e.t.	FC Bern

FC Biel-Bienne win 7–5 on aggregate and remain in the 1987–88 Nationalliga B. FC Bern remain in the division for the 1987–88 Swiss 1. Liga season..

Team 1	Score	Team 2
FC Renens	2–1	SC Buochs
SC Buochs	2–3	FC Renens

FC Renens win 5–3 on aggregate and remain in the 1987–88 Nationalliga B. SC Buochs remain in the division for the 1987–88 Swiss 1. Liga season..

Team 1	Score	Team 2
SC Kriens	0–4	BSC Old Boys
BSC Old Boys	2–1	SC Kriens

BSC Old Boys win 6–1 on aggregate and are promoted to the 1987–88 Nationalliga B. SC Kriens are relegated to the 1987–88 Swiss 1. Liga season..

== Attendances ==
#	Club	Average
1	Xamax	10,840
2	Luzern	7,793
3	Bellinzona	7,433
4	Sion	6,720
5	St. Gallen	6,713
6	Young Boys	6,440
7	Aarau	4,973
8	Servette	4,913
9	Zürich	4,707
10	Grasshopper	4,677
11	Locarno	4,620
12	Lausanne	4,500
13	Basel	4,427
14	Wettingen	2,747
15	Vevey	2,340
16	La Chaux-de-Fonds	893

== Further in Swiss football ==
- 1986–87 Swiss Cup
- 1986–87 Swiss 1. Liga

== Sources ==
- Switzerland 1986–87 at RSSSF

Preceded by 1985–86	Nationalliga seasons in Switzerland	Succeeded by 1987–88
