= FC Wettingen =

- Full name: FC Wettingen
- Nickname: Blau-Weiss
- Founded: 1931 (as FC Wettingen), 1993 (as FC Wettingen 1993)
- Ground: Stadion Altenburg, Wettingen
- Capacity: 10,000 (700 Seats)
- Chairman: Hans-Peter Odermatt
- Manager: Heinz Füglister
- League: Swiss 2nd Liga

FC Wettingen was a Swiss football club from Wettingen, Switzerland. It was founded in 1931, but due to financial problems they went bankrupt in 1993. In the same year it was refounded as FC Wettingen 93. In the 2012/13 season, the name was changed back to FC Wettingen. They play their home games at Stadion Altenburg.

== History ==
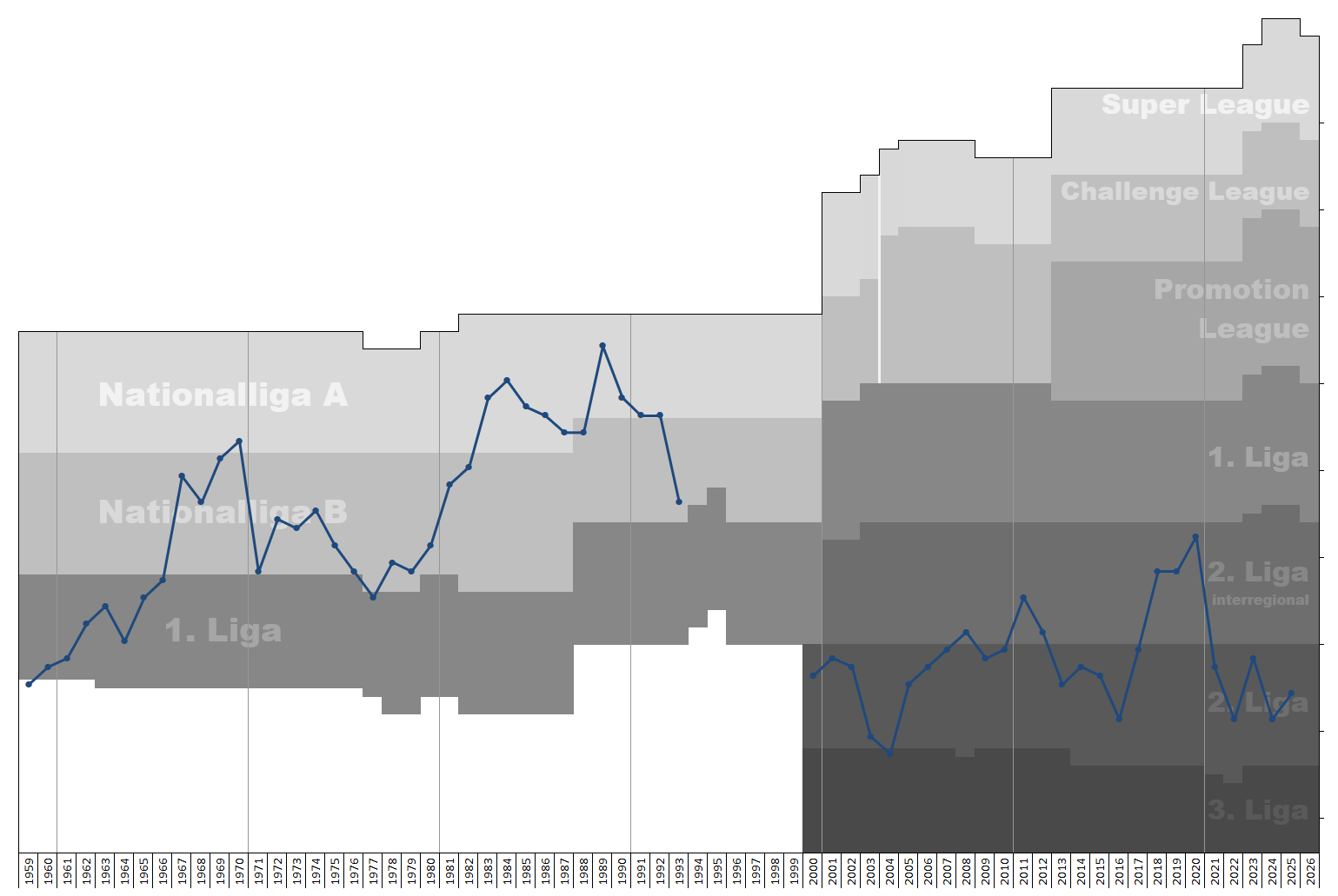
Chart of FC Wettingen table positions in the Swiss football league system

FC Wettingen spent the first few decades of their life bobbing around the lower echelons of the Swiss leagues until finally in 1969 they made it to the National League B. The next season they gained promotion and in the 1969/70 season they played in the Swiss Super League. However, due to their poor return of 15 points from 26 games they were relegated, finishing in 13th place out of 14.

The club spent the next years in the lower leagues of Swiss football until they made a return to top-level football for the 1982–83 season where they remained until their relegation in the 1986–87 season. They made a swift return to the top flight gaining promotion in the 1987–88 season. The 1988/89 season was the most successful for the club and they finished in 4th place thus qualifying for the UEFA Cup (see below). In 1991/92 the club was relegated from the Swiss Super League for the third time. After the 1992/93 season the club folded due to financial reasons and began with the new name FC Wettingen 93 in the 5th League.

== FC Wettingen in Europe ==
Season	Competition	Round	Country	Club	Results
1989/90	UEFA Cup	1	(Republic of Ireland)	Dundalk	3:0, 2:0
		2	(Italy)	Napoli	0:0, 1:2

== See also ==
- 1989 Klötzli incident
