= FC Herisau =

Swiss football club

- Full name: FC Herisau
- Founded: 1906
- Ground: Ebnet, Herisau
- Capacity: 2,000
- Chairman: Wäspi, Marc
- Manager: Troccoli, Domenico
- League: 2. Liga Interregional
Home colours	Away colours

FC Herisau are a Swiss football team currently playing in 2. Liga Interregional, the fourth tier in the Swiss football pyramid Group 5. The club was formed in 1906. They finished 2008/2009 season in 11th position just avoiding relegation .

== Staff and board members ==
- President: Marc Wäspi
- Vice President: Ueli Fischer
- Secretary: Stefan Nef
- Treasurer: Marianne Bauer
- Manager: Sven Ullmann
