= Swiss Football League =

Swiss professional football league

The Swiss Football League is the organisation which controls and directs the professional football in Switzerland and Liechtenstein. Founded in 1933 as the National League (in German Nationalliga, in French Ligue Nationale), it assumed its current name in 2003.

It deals with the Super League and Challenge League championships and is therefore made up of 22 clubs.

== History ==
=== Birth of the National League ===
The National League was founded between 15 and 16 June 1933 in Vevey, where representatives of several clubs had gathered to end years of discussions on the reform of national football. At that time there were two organizations within the federation, the Zusammenschluss der unteren Serien (ZUS), founded in 1921 by the Serie B and Serie C and the Association Suisse de Série A (ASSA), founded in 1925, to which the teams of the maximum series belonged. In the 1931-1932 the National League championship was created, although only two years later the control body of the same name was born. The reform that gave birth to the single group championship was implemented for the 1933–1934 season. On 28 August 1933, the first matches were played under the aegis of the new league.

With the reform called "Wiederkehr project", approved during the extraordinary federal assembly held in Lugano on 9 October 1943, starting from the 1944–1945 season the National League championship was split into two distinct categories, called Lega National A and National League B., each of which is made up of 14 teams

=== Professionalism ===
On 5 July 1960, a circular from the Transfer- und Aufsichtskommission der National-Liga (TRAKO), the Supervisory Commission for transfers of the National League, announced the possibility of transferring a player from one club to another, in exchange of a sum of money, without a request for authorization to TRAKO itself. As a consequence of this, the status of Swiss footballers, who until then had remained officially "amateur", became "semi-professional". This practice was, moreover, already followed by the main clubs.

=== The name change ===
When the league took on its current name in 2003, the championships were also subsequently renamed as Super League and Challenge League.

== League membership ==
The members of the League are 22, twelve from the Super League and ten from the Challenge League.

== Related Items ==
- Swiss Football Association
