= Stadion Lachen =

Multi-use stadium in Thun, Switzerland

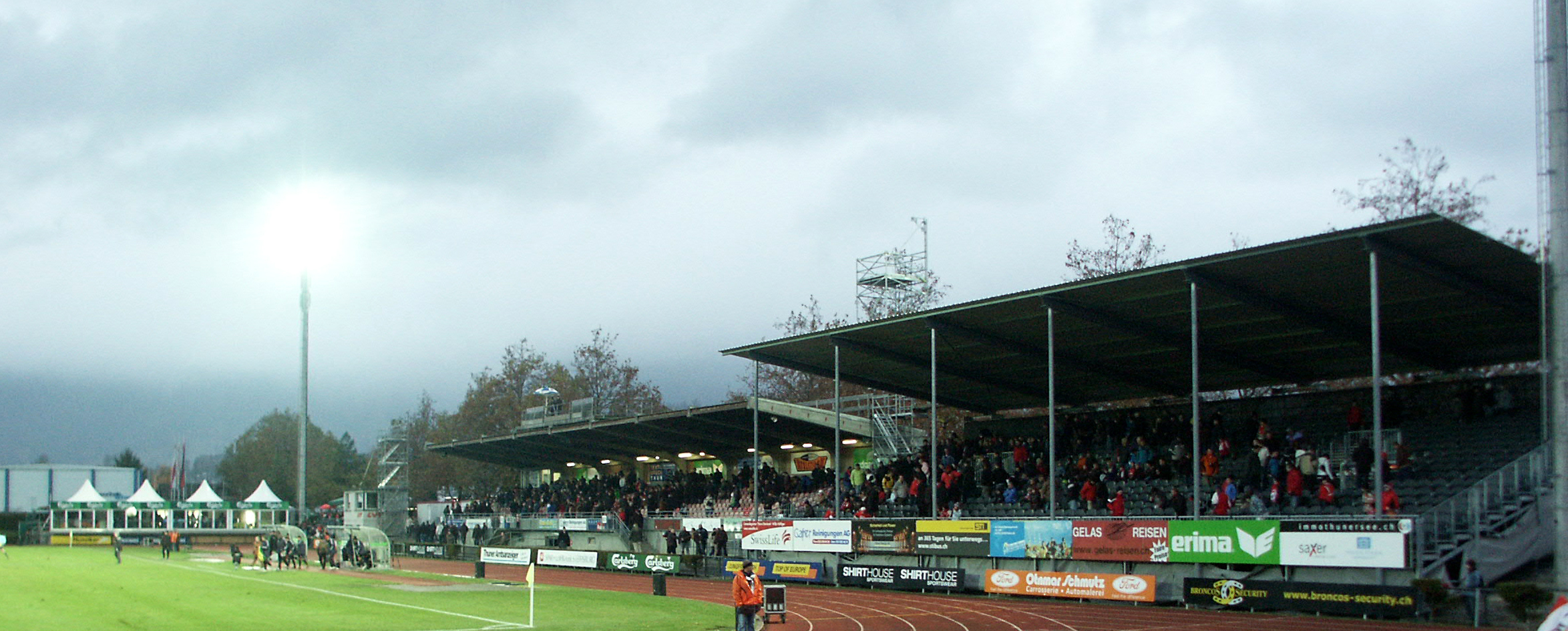
- Interactive map of Stadion Lachen
- Location: Thun, Switzerland
- Coordinates: 46°44′18″N 7°37′43″E
- Capacity: 10,350
- Record attendance: 10,200 (2004)

Construction
- Opened: 1954

Tenant
- FC Thun (1954-2011) Thun Tigers (2012-present)

Stadion Lachen is a multi-use stadium in Thun, Switzerland. It is currently used mostly for American football matches of the Thun Tigers. The stadium served as the home ground of FC Thun from 1954 to 2011 until the Swiss Football League deemed it unfit for top-tier football, prompting the club to construct a new stadium. The stadium has a capacity of 10,350 and opened in 1954. The stadium has areas for both sitting and standing.

The Thun Tigers play home matches at the Stadium since 2012 in the Nationalliga A (American football) the top-level league for American football in Switzerland.

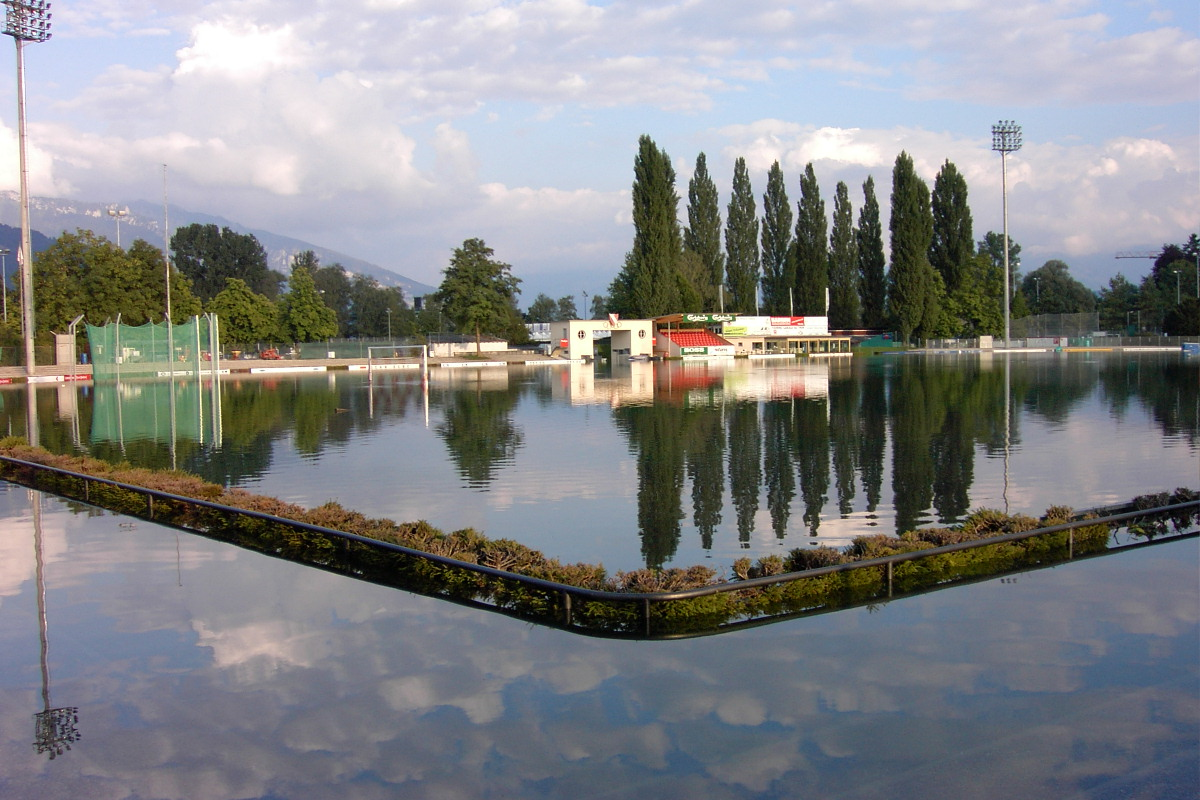
The grounds during a flood in 2005
