= Sportplatz 3 Sapins =

Sportplatz 3 Sapins (French: Stade des 3 Sapins) is a stadium in Échallens, Switzerland. It is currently used for football matches and is the home ground of FC Échallens Région. The capacity is 3,000 and is the opposite of the modern all seater stadiums in that it is standing-room only.

== See also ==
List of football stadiums in Switzerland
