= La Blancherie =

Coordinates: 47°21′36.44″N 7°20′29.09″E

Stade de la Blancherie is a stadium in Delémont, Switzerland. It is the home of SR Delémont and has a capacity of 5,263. The stadium has 600 seats and 4,600 standing places.
