= 1989–90 UEFA Cup =

19th season of Europe's secondary club football tournament organised by UEFA

Tournament details
- Dates: 9 August 1989 – 16 May 1990
- Teams: 65

Final positions
- Champions: (Italy) Juventus (2nd title)
- Runners-up: (Italy) Fiorentina

Tournament statistics
- Matches played: 128
- Goals scored: 329 (2.57 per match)
- Attendance: 2,464,303 (19,252 per match)
- Top scorer(s): Falko Götz (Köln); Karl-Heinz Riedle (Werder Bremen); 6 goals each

The 1989–90 UEFA Cup was the 19th season of the UEFA Cup, the secondary club football competition organised by the Union of European Football Associations (UEFA). The final was played over two legs at the Stadio Comunale Vittorio Pozzo, Turin, Italy, and at the Stadio Partenio, Avellino, Italy. The competition was won by Juventus, who defeated fellow Italian team Fiorentina by an aggregate result of 3–1 to claim their second UEFA Cup title.

This was the first final between two Italian sides in the UEFA competitions history and the third between two clubs of the same country. This was the fifth and final season in which all English clubs were banned from European football competitions

== Association team allocation ==
A total of 65 teams from 31 UEFA member associations participated in the 1988–89 UEFA Cup. 63 teams entered from the first round, competing over six knock-out rounds, while two other teams competed in a preliminary round.

The association ranking based on the UEFA country coefficients is used to determine the number of participating teams for each association:

- Associations 1–3 each have four teams qualify.
- Associations 4–8 each have three teams qualify.
- Associations 9–21 each have two teams qualify.
- Associations 22–32 each have one team qualify.

Due to the ongoing English ban, their first berth was allocated to association 9, gaining a third berth. As two associations were tied for 10th place in the UEFA rankings, both of them qualified a third team for a preliminary round, whose winner would take the remaining English berth in the first round.

=== Association ranking ===
For the 1989–90 UEFA Cup, the associations are allocated places according to their 1988 UEFA country coefficients, which takes into account their performance in European competitions from 1983–84 to 1987–88.

Association ranking for 1989–90 UEFA Cup

Rank	Association	Coeff.	Teams	Notes
1	Italy	41.082	4	
2	Soviet Union	37.550	4	
3	West Germany	36.165	4	
4	Spain	34.799	3	
5	Belgium	31.800	3	
6	Portugal	28.183	3	
7	Scotland	27.700	3	
8	Netherlands	26.633	3	
9	Austria	26.500	3	
=10	France	23.200	3	
=10	(Socialist Federal Republic of Yugoslavia) Yugoslavia	23.200	3	
12	England	22.094	0	
13	Sweden	21.500	2	
14	Czechoslovakia	21.300	2	
15	Romania	20.466	2	
16	East Germany	18.750	2	
17	Greece	17.916	2	

Rank	Association	Coeff.	Teams	Notes
18	Hungary	17.500	2	
19	Switzerland	15.000	2	
20	Finland	13.664	2	
-	Wales	13.000	0	
21	Poland	12.750	2	
22	Bulgaria	11.916	1	
23	Denmark	10.916	1	
24	Albania	9.666	1	
25	Turkey	7.999	1	
26	Norway	6.666	1	
27	Cyprus	6.332	1	
28	(Northern Ireland) Northern Ireland	4.999	1	
29	Iceland	3.999	1	
30	(Republic of Ireland) Republic of Ireland	2.665	1	
31	Malta	1.666	1	
32	Luxembourg	1.665	1	

England: Since the Heysel Stadium disaster in 1985, all English football clubs were placed under an indefinite ban by Union of European Football Associations (UEFA) from all European competitions, which would be lifted in 1990–91. As England was twelfth in the UEFA rankings after three years of ban had been tabulated, their two berths were to be transferred as a third berth for associations 9 and 10. While the first one went to Austria, both France and Yugoslavia were tied as the association 10. Therefore, both countries were awarded a third berth for a special preliminary round to obtain the remaining spot in the first round. In England, League Cup winners Nottingham Forest and Norwich City would have qualified by league position. Had England retained the four European places it held before the ban, Derby County and Tottenham Hotspur would have also qualified.
Wales: There was no national league in Wales before 1992 and the only competition organised by the Football Association of Wales was the Welsh Cup so Wales had just a single participant in European competitions, the winner (or best placed Welsh team as several English teams also competed) of the Welsh Cup which competed in the UEFA Cup Winners' Cup. Its virtual ranking is only an original research, because the UEFA country ranking was only used to allocate the UEFA Cup spots at time, so Wales was not included.

=== Teams ===
The labels in parentheses show how each team qualified for competition:

- TH: Title holders
- CW: Cup winners
- CR: Cup runners-up
- LC: League Cup winners
- 2nd, 3rd, 4th, 5th, 6th, etc.: League position
- P-W: End-of-season European competition play-offs winners

Qualified teams for 1989–90 UEFA Cup
First round
(Italy) Napoli (2nd)^{TH}	(Italy) Juventus (4th)	(Italy) Atalanta (6th)	(Italy) Fiorentina (P-W)
(Soviet Union) Dynamo Kyiv (2nd)	(Soviet Union) Spartak Moscow (4th)	(Soviet Union) Žalgiris Vilnius (5th)	(Soviet Union) Zenit (6th)
(West Germany) Köln (2nd)	(West Germany) Werder Bremen (3rd)	(West Germany) Hamburg (4th)	(West Germany) Stuttgart (5th)
(Spain) Valencia (3rd)	(Spain) Atlético Madrid (4th)	(Spain) Zaragoza (5th)	(Belgium) RFC Liège (3rd)
(Belgium) Club Brugge (4th)	(Belgium) Antwerp (5th)	(Portugal) Porto (2nd)	(Portugal) Boavista (3rd)
(Portugal) Sporting CP (4th)	(Scotland) Aberdeen (2nd)	(Scotland) Dundee United (4th)	(Scotland) Hibernian (5th)
(Netherlands) Ajax (2nd)	(Netherlands) Twente (3rd)	(Netherlands) Feyenoord (4th)	Austria Wien (3rd)
(Austria) Rapid Wien (4th)	(Austria) First Vienna (5th)	(France) Paris Saint-Germain (2nd)	(France) Sochaux (4th)
(Socialist Federal Republic of Yugoslavia) Red Star Belgrade (2nd)	(Socialist Federal Republic of Yugoslavia) Rad (4th)	(Sweden) IFK Göteborg (3rd)	(Sweden) Örgryte (4th)
(Czechoslovakia) Baník Ostrava (2nd)	(Czechoslovakia) Plastika Nitra (3rd)	(Romania) Victoria București (3rd)	(Romania) Flacăra Moreni (4th)
(East Germany) Karl-Marx-Stadt (3rd)	(East Germany) Hansa Rostock (4th)	(Greece) Olympiacos (2nd)	(Greece) Iraklis (4th)
(Hungary) MTK (3rd)	(Hungary) Videoton (4th)	(Switzerland) Sion (3rd)	(Switzerland) Wettingen (4th)
(Finland) Kuusysi (2nd)	(Finland) RoPS (3rd)	(Poland) Katowice (2nd)	(Poland) Górnik Zabrze (3rd)
(Bulgaria) Vitosha Sofia (2nd)	(Denmark) Næstved (2nd)	(Albania) Apolonia (4th)	(Turkey) Galatasaray (3rd)
(Norway) Lillestrøm (2nd)	(Cyprus) Apollon Limassol (2nd)	(Northern Ireland) Glentoran (2nd)	(Iceland) ÍA (3rd)
(Republic of Ireland) Dundalk (2nd)	(Malta) Valletta (2nd)	(Luxembourg) Jeunesse Esch (2nd)	
Preliminary round
(France) Auxerre (5th)	(Socialist Federal Republic of Yugoslavia) Dinamo Zagreb (5th)		

Notes

1. Albania: Partizani finished second in the 1988–89 Albanian National Championship, but couldn't compete in the UEFA Cup, as it was serving a 4-year ban from European competitions, which was eventually reduced to two years. The ban was imposed in late 1987, due to the violent play against Benfica in the first round of the 1987–88 European Cup, and its subsequent disqualification. Apolonia, the next-best team not yet qualified for European competition, took its spot in the UEFA Cup.
2. Yugoslavia: Hajduk Split finished third in the 1988–89 Yugoslav First League, but it was banned in November 1987 from entering any UEFA competition for two seasons, due to crowd trouble during the club's 1987–88 European Cup Winners' Cup second round return leg against Marseille, which came after repeated prior incidents at Hajduk's European home matches throughout the early-to-mid 1980s. The ban was only enacted on seasons where Hadjuk Split would've qualified for European competition, with this being the first instance. Dinamo Zagreb, the next-best team not yet qualified for European competition, took its spot in the UEFA Cup.

== Schedule ==
The schedule of the competition was as follows. Matches were scheduled for Tuesdays and Wednesdays, with each legs of both semifinals now being held over consecutive days. Matches for the first and second round were held on Tuesdays, while other rounds were held on Wednesdays, except for the Antwerp vs Stuttgart match-up in the third round.

Schedule for 1989–90 UEFA Cup
Round	First leg	Second leg
Preliminary round	9 August 1989	23 August 1989
First round	12 September 1989	26 September 1989
Second round	17 October 1989	31 October 1989
Third round	21–22 November 1989	5–6 December 1989
Quarter-finals	7 March 1990	21 March 1990
Semi-finals	3–4 April 1990	17–18 April 1990
Final	2 May 1990	16 May 1990

== Preliminary round ==
Team 1	Agg.	Team 2	1st leg	2nd leg
Auxerre (France)	3–2	(Socialist Federal Republic of Yugoslavia) Dinamo Zagreb	0–1	3–1

=== First leg ===
9 August 1989

Auxerre (France)	0–1	(Socialist Federal Republic of Yugoslavia) Dinamo Zagreb
	Report	Šuker 79'

Stade de l'Abbé-Deschamps, Auxerre
Attendance: 7,885
Referee: Allan Gunn (England)

=== Second leg ===
23 August 1989

Dinamo Zagreb (Socialist Federal Republic of Yugoslavia)	1–3	(France) Auxerre
Panadić 54'	Report	Kovács 33'; Otokoré 36', 57'

Stadion Maksimir, Zagreb
Attendance: 28,471
Referee: Ulf Eriksson (Sweden)

Auxerre won 3–2 on aggregate.

== First round ==
Team 1	Agg.	Team 2	1st leg	2nd leg
Austria Wien	4–0	(Netherlands) Ajax	1–0	3–0
Vitosha Sofia (Bulgaria)	3–4	(Belgium) Antwerp	0–0	3–4
Apollon Limassol (Cyprus)	1–4	(Spain) Zaragoza	0–3	1–1
Aberdeen (Scotland)	2–2 (a)	(Austria) Rapid Wien	2–1	0–1
Hibernian (Scotland)	4–0	(Hungary) Videoton	1–0	3–0
Atlético Madrid (Spain)	1–1 (1–3 p)	(Italy) Fiorentina	1–0	0–1 (a.e.t.)
Valencia (Spain)	4–2	(Romania) Victoria București	3–1	1–1
Kuusysi (Finland)	2–3	(France) Paris Saint-Germain	0–0	2–3
RoPS (Finland)	2–1	(Poland) GKS Katowice	1–1	1–0
Auxerre (France)	8–0	(Albania) Apolonia	5–0	3–0
Sochaux (France)	12–0	(Luxembourg) Jeunesse Esch	7–0	5–0
Iraklis (Greece)	1–2	(Switzerland) Sion	1–0	0–2
Glentoran (Northern Ireland)	1–5	(Scotland) Dundee United	1–3	0–2
ÍA (Iceland)	1–6	(Belgium) RFC Liège	0–2	1–4
Atalanta (Italy)	0–2	(Soviet Union) Spartak Moscow	0–0	0–2
Valletta (Malta)	1–7	(Austria) First Vienna	1–4	0–3
Lillestrøm (Norway)	1–5	(West Germany) Werder Bremen	1–3	0–2
Twente (Netherlands)	1–4	(Belgium) Club Brugge	0–0	1–4
Górnik Zabrze (Poland)	2–5	(Italy) Juventus	0–1	2–4
Sporting CP (Portugal)	0–0 (3–4 p)	(Italy) Napoli	0–0	0–0 (a.e.t.)
Porto (Portugal)	4–1	(Romania) Flacăra Moreni	2–0	2–1
Köln (West Germany)	5–1	(Czechoslovakia) Plastika Nitra	4–1	1–0
Stuttgart (West Germany)	3–2	(Netherlands) Feyenoord	2–0	1–2
Örgryte (Sweden)	2–7	(West Germany) Hamburg	1–2	1–5
Wettingen (Switzerland)	5–0	(Republic of Ireland) Dundalk	3–0	2–0
Galatasaray (Turkey)	1–3	(Socialist Federal Republic of Yugoslavia) Red Star Belgrade	1–1	0–2
Dynamo Kyiv (Soviet Union)	6–1	(Hungary) MTK	4–0	2–1
Zenit Leningrad (Soviet Union)	3–1	(Denmark) Næstved	3–1	0–0
Žalgiris Vilnius (Soviet Union)	2–1	(Sweden) IFK Göteborg	2–0	0–1
Rad (Socialist Federal Republic of Yugoslavia)	2–3	(Greece) Olympiacos	2–1	0–2
Karl-Marx-Stadt (East Germany)	3–2	(Portugal) Boavista	1–0	2–2 (a.e.t.)
Hansa Rostock (East Germany)	2–7	(Czechoslovakia) Baník Ostrava	2–3	0–4

=== First leg ===
12 September 1989

Austria Wien	1–0	(Netherlands) Ajax
Degeorgi 18'	Report

Praterstadion, Vienna
Attendance: 10,000
Referee: George Smith (Scotland)

12 September 1989

Vitosha Sofia (Bulgaria)	0–0	(Belgium) Antwerp
	Report

Vasil Levski National Stadium, Sofia
Attendance: 10,000
Referee: Michel Girard (France)

12 September 1989

Apollon Limassol (Cyprus)	0–3	(Spain) Zaragoza
	Report	Juanito 44' (pen.); Pardeza 73'; Pablo Alfaro 84'

Tsirio Stadium, Limassol
Attendance: 6,490
Referee: Todor Kolev (Bulgaria)

12 September 1989

Aberdeen (Scotland)	2–1	(Austria) Rapid Wien
C. Robertson 80'; Grant 89'	Report	Kranjčar 7'

Pittodrie Stadium, Aberdeen
Attendance: 16,439
Referee: José María Enríquez Negreira (Spain)

12 September 1989

Hibernian (Scotland)	1–0	(Hungary) Videoton
Mitchell 25'	Report

Easter Road Stadium, Edinburgh
Attendance: 12,800
Referee: Jean-François Crucke (Belgium)

12 September 1989

Atlético Madrid (Spain)	1–0	(Italy) Fiorentina
Baltazar 78'	Report

Estadio Vicente Calderón, Madrid
Attendance: 38,000
Referee: Aron Schmidhuber (West Germany)

12 September 1989

Valencia (Spain)	3–1	(Romania) Victoria București
Toni 36'; Fenoll 48'; Flores 71'	Report	Coraș 61'

Estadio Luis Casanova, Valencia
Attendance: 18,000
Referee: Karl-Heinz Tritschler (West Germany)

12 September 1989

Kuusysi (Finland)	0–0	(France) Paris Saint-Germain
	Report

Lahden kisapuisto, Lahti
Attendance: 3,882
Referee: Wieland Ziller (East Germany)

12 September 1989

RoPS (Finland)	1–1	(Poland) GKS Katowice
Tiainen 43'	Report	Kubisztal 2'

Rovaniemen keskuskenttä, Rovaniemi
Attendance: 2,967
Referee: Henning Lund-Sørensen (Denmark)

12 September 1989

Auxerre (France)	5–0	(Albania) Apolonia
Boli 20'; Vahirua 51', 56'; Pogaçë 62' (o.g.); Guerreiro 73'	Report

Stade de l'Abbé-Deschamps, Auxerre
Attendance: 10,455
Referee: Serge Muhmenthaler (Switzerland)

12 September 1989

Sochaux (France)	7–0	(Luxembourg) Jeunesse Esch
Lada 6', 25'; Silvestre 22'; Oudjani 47', 70'; Carrasco 88'; Petry 90' (o.g.)	Report

Stade Auguste-Bonal, Montbéliard
Attendance: 2,182
Referee: Freddy Philippoz (Switzerland)

12 September 1989

Iraklis (Greece)	1–0	(Switzerland) Sion
Toutziaris 28'	Report

Kaftanzoglio Stadium, Thessaloniki
Attendance: 14,041
Referee: Jozef Marko (Czechoslovakia)

12 September 1989

Glentoran (Northern Ireland)	1–3	(Scotland) Dundee United
Jameson 68'	Report	Cleland 31'; McInally 71'; Hinds 85'

The Oval, Belfast
Attendance: 5,814
Referee: Keith Burge (Wales)

12 September 1989

ÍA (Iceland)	0–2	(Belgium) RFC Liège
	Report	Ernès 7'; Waseige 81'

Akranesvöllur, Akranes
Attendance: 684
Referee: Denis McArdle (Republic of Ireland)

12 September 1989

Atalanta (Italy)	0–0	(Soviet Union) Spartak Moscow
	Report

Stadio Comunale, Bergamo
Attendance: 20,063
Referee: Marcel Van Langenhove (Belgium)

12 September 1989

Valletta (Malta)	1–4	(Austria) First Vienna
Zarb 63' (pen.)	Report	Camilleri 17' (o.g.); Balzis 42'; Vidreis 51'; Heraf 86'

Ta' Qali, Attard
Attendance: 1,520
Referee: Giorgos Koukoulakis (Greece)

12 September 1989

Lillestrøm (Norway)	1–3	(West Germany) Werder Bremen
Pedersen 87'	Report	Eilts 10'; Bode 15', 71'

Åråsen Stadion, Lillestrøm
Attendance: 6,972
Referee: Guðmundur Haraldsson (Iceland)

12 September 1989

Twente (Netherlands)	0–0	(Belgium) Club Brugge
	Report

Stadion Het Diekman, Enschede
Attendance: 12,857
Referee: Peter Mikkelsen (Denmark)

12 September 1989

Górnik Zabrze (Poland)	0–1	(Italy) Juventus
	Report	Zavarov 72'

Stadion Górnik, Zabrze
Attendance: 19,633
Referee: Kurt Röthlisberger (Switzerland)

12 September 1989

Sporting CP (Portugal)	0–0	(Italy) Napoli
	Report

Estádio José Alvalade, Lisbon
Attendance: 40,000
Referee: George Courtney (England)

12 September 1989

Porto (Portugal)	2–0	(Romania) Flacăra Moreni
Zé Carlos 36'; Branco 56'	Report

Estádio das Antas, Porto
Attendance: 25,000
Referee: Gerhard Kapl (Austria)

12 September 1989

Köln (West Germany)	4–1	(Czechoslovakia) Plastika Nitra
Götz 8', 56', 60'; Littbarski 72' (pen.)	Report	Hipp 19'

Müngersdorfer Stadion, Cologne
Attendance: 7,000
Referee: Andrew Ritchie (Northern Ireland)

12 September 1989

Stuttgart (West Germany)	2–0	(Netherlands) Feyenoord
Walter 21'; Allgöwer 48'	Report

Neckarstadion, Stuttgart
Attendance: 18,641
Referee: Keith Hackett (England)

12 September 1989

Örgryte (Sweden)	1–2	(West Germany) Hamburg
Roth 71'	Report	Furtok 8'; Jensen 80'

Ullevi, Gothenburg
Attendance: 3,454
Referee: Allan Gunn (England)

12 September 1989

Wettingen (Switzerland)	3–0	(Republic of Ireland) Dundalk
Cleary 42' (o.g.); Corneliusson 66'; Löbmann 69'	Report

Stadion Altenburg, Wettingen
Attendance: 3,700
Referee: Dušan Krchňák (Czechoslovakia)

12 September 1989

Galatasaray (Turkey)	1–1	(Socialist Federal Republic of Yugoslavia) Red Star Belgrade
Hasan 35'	Report	Mrkela 11'

Ali Sami Yen Stadium, Istanbul
Attendance: 30,580
Referee: Alphonse Costantin (Belgium)

12 September 1989

Dynamo Kyiv (Soviet Union)	4–0	(Hungary) MTK
Protasov 12'; Rats 23', 33'; Yakovenko 55'	Report

Republican Stadium, Kyiv
Attendance: 35,000
Referee: Dimitar Dimitrov (Bulgaria)

12 September 1989

Zenit Leningrad (Soviet Union)	3–1	(Denmark) Næstved
Chukhlov 22'; Stepanov 60'; Popelnukha 74'	Report	Jørgensen 19' (pen.)

Kirov Stadium, Leningrad
Attendance: 8,200
Referee: Eero Aho (Finland)

12 September 1989

Žalgiris Vilnius (Soviet Union)	2–0	(Sweden) IFK Göteborg
Fridrikas 36', 88'	Report

Žalgiris Stadium, Vilnius
Attendance: 15,200
Referee: Branko Bujić (Yugoslavia)

12 September 1989

Rad (Socialist Federal Republic of Yugoslavia)	2–1	(Greece) Olympiacos
Nestorović 37'; Đoinčević 53'	Report	Tsalouchidis 89'

Stadion FK Rad, Belgrade
Attendance: 5,000
Referee: Joe Worrall (England)

12 September 1989

Karl-Marx-Stadt (East Germany)	1–0	(Portugal) Boavista
Köhler 17'	Report

Ernst-Thälmann-Stadion, Karl-Marx-Stadt
Attendance: 19,828
Referee: Einar Halle (Norway)

12 September 1989

Hansa Rostock (East Germany)	2–3	(Czechoslovakia) Baník Ostrava
Wahl 27', 38' (pen.)	Report	Kula 57'; Hýravý 66'; Horváth 75'

Ostseestadion, Rostock
Attendance: 20,320
Referee: Kaj Natri (Finland)

=== Second leg ===
26 September 1989

Ajax (Netherlands)	0–3	Austria Wien
Wouters 44'	Report	Pleva 98'

Stadion De Meer, Amsterdam
Attendance: 23,221
Referee: Bruno Galler (Switzerland)

The match was abandoned in the 104th minute with the score at 1–1 after Austria Wien's goalkeeper Franz Wohlfahrt was struck by an iron rod thrown from the home stand. As a result, Ajax had to concede the match by default and were excluded from competing in European football for a year. Austria Wien won 4–0 on aggregate.

26 September 1989

Antwerp (Belgium)	4–3	(Bulgaria) Vitosha Sofia
Geilenkirchen 85'; Claesen 90', 90+2'; Quaranta 90+5'	Report	Slavchev 6'; Donkov 87'; Mihtarski 89'

Bosuilstadion, Antwerp
Attendance: 7,000
Referee: Friedrich Kaupe (Austria)

Antwerp won 4–3 on aggregate.

26 September 1989

Zaragoza (Spain)	1–1	(Cyprus) Apollon Limassol
Pardeza 89'	Report	Pittas 39' (pen.)

Estadio La Romareda, Zaragoza
Attendance: 10,000
Referee: Ernest Kesseler (Luxembourg)

Zaragoza won 4–1 on aggregate.

26 September 1989

Rapid Wien (Austria)	1–0	(Scotland) Aberdeen
Fjørtoft 18'	Report

Praterstadion, Vienna
Attendance: 19,000
Referee: Dieter Pauly (West Germany)

2–2 on aggregate; Rapid Wien won on away goals.

26 September 1989

Videoton (Hungary)	0–3	(Scotland) Hibernian
	Report	Houchen 9'; Evans 60'; Collins 80'

Sóstói Stadion, Székesfehérvár
Attendance: 16,166
Referee: Karl-Josef Assenmacher (West Germany)

Hibernian won 4–0 on aggregate.

26 September 1989

Fiorentina (Italy)	1–0 (a.e.t.)	(Spain) Atlético Madrid
Buso 25'	Report
Penalties
Battistini (penalty scored); Pioli (penalty scored); Sereni (penalty missed); Volpecina (penalty missed); Baggio (penalty scored)	3–1	(penalty missed) Futre; (penalty missed) Marina; (penalty scored) Bustingorri; (penalty missed) Manolo

Stadio Renato Curi, Perugia
Attendance: 24,544
Referee: Michel Vautrot (France)

1–1 on aggregate; Fiorentina won 3–1 on penalties.

26 September 1989

Victoria București (Romania)	1–1	(Spain) Valencia
Hanganu 52'	Report	Toni 37'

Stadionul Victoria, Bucharest
Attendance: 7,300
Referee: Luigi Agnolin (Italy)

Valencia won 4–2 on aggregate.

26 September 1989

Paris Saint-Germain (France)	3–2	(Finland) Kuusysi
Sušić 18'; Vujović 57'; Calderón 68'	Report	Remes 14'; Lius 90' (pen.)

Parc des Princes, Paris
Attendance: 9,437
Referee: José Veiga Trigo (Portugal)

Paris Saint-Germain won 3–2 on aggregate.

26 September 1989

GKS Katowice (Poland)	0–1	(Finland) RoPS
	Report	Karila 59'

Stadion GKS Katowice, Katowice
Attendance: 3,185
Referee: Arsen Hoxha (Albania)

RoPS won 2–1 on aggregate.

26 September 1989

Apolonia (Albania)	0–3	(France) Auxerre
	Report	Scifo 20', 31'; Cocard 72'

Stadiumi Flamurtari, Vlorë
Attendance: 4,500
Referee: Alphonse Constantin (Belgium)

Auxerre won 8–0 on aggregate.

26 September 1989

Jeunesse Esch (Luxembourg)	0–5	(France) Sochaux
	Report	Carrasco 8'; Thomas 27', 28', 54'; Silvestre 39'

Stade de la Frontière, Esch-sur-Alzette
Attendance: 1,000
Referee: Ignace Goris (Belgium)

Sochaux won 12–0 on aggregate.

26 September 1989

Sion (Switzerland)	2–0	(Greece) Iraklis
Baljić 75'; López 79'	Report

Stade de Tourbillon, Sion
Attendance: 14,630
Referee: José María Enríquez Negreira (Spain)

Sion won 2–1 on aggregate.

26 September 1989

Dundee United (Scotland)	2–0	(Northern Ireland) Glentoran
Clark 25'; Gallacher 47'	Report

Tannadice Park, Dundee
Attendance: 9,344
Referee: Neil Midgley (England)

Dundee United won 5–1 on aggregate.

26 September 1989

RFC Liège (Belgium)	4–1	(Iceland) ÍA
Ernès 5', 19'; Wégria 40'; Boffin 83'	Report	Pétursson 22'

Stade Vélodrome de Rocourt, Liège
Attendance: 2,501
Referee: René Bindels (Luxembourg)

RFC Liège won 6–1 on aggregate.

26 September 1989

Spartak Moscow (Soviet Union)	2–0	(Italy) Atalanta
Cherenkov 28'; Rodionov 88'	Report

Central Lenin Stadium, Moscow
Attendance: 49,987
Referee: Bo Karlsson (Sweden)

Spartak Moscow won 2–0 on aggregate.

26 September 1989

First Vienna (Austria)	3–0	(Malta) Valletta
Jenisch 20'; Balzis 57', 78'	Report

Stadion Hohe Warte, Vienna
Attendance: 680
Referee: Lajos Hartmann (Hungary)

First Vienna won 7–1 on aggregate.

26 September 1989

Werder Bremen (West Germany)	2–0	(Norway) Lillestrøm
Neubarth 66'; Sauer 89'	Report

Weserstadion, Bremen
Attendance: 9,873
Referee: Charles Agius (Malta)

Werder Bremen won 5–1 on aggregate.

26 September 1989

Club Brugge (Belgium)	4–1	(Netherlands) Twente
Booy 7'; Disztl 18'; Staelens 20'; Farina 32'	Report	Paus 24'

Olympiastadion, Bruges
Attendance: 18,334
Referee: Wolf-Günter Wiesel (West Germany)

Club Brugge won 4–1 on aggregate.

26 September 1989

Juventus (Italy)	4–2	(Poland) Górnik Zabrze
Schillaci 2', 25'; Fortunato 4'; Marocchi 6'	Report	Koseła 44'; Lissek 83'

Stadio Comunale Vittorio Pozzo, Turin
Attendance: 12,897
Referee: Karl-Heinz Tritschler (West Germany)

Juventus won 5–2 on aggregate.

26 September 1989

Napoli (Italy)	0–0 (a.e.t.)	(Portugal) Sporting CP
	Report
Penalties
Crippa (penalty missed); Careca (penalty scored); Mauro (penalty scored); Baroni (penalty scored); Maradona (penalty missed); Ferrara (penalty scored)	4–3	(penalty missed) Luizinho; (penalty scored) Douglas; (penalty missed) Marlon; (penalty scored) Cascavel; (penalty scored) Carlos Manuel; (penalty missed) Gomes

Stadio San Paolo, Naples
Attendance: 53,268
Referee: Gérard Biguet (France)

0–0 on aggregate; Napoli won 4–3 on penalties.

26 September 1989

Flacăra Moreni (Romania)	1–2	(Portugal) Porto
Beldie 52'	Report	Magalhães 21'; Águas 89'

Stadionul Flacăra, Moreni
Attendance: 8,000
Referee: Yusuf Namoğlu (Turkey)

Porto won 4–1 on aggregate.

26 September 1989

Plastika Nitra (Czechoslovakia)	0–1	(West Germany) Köln
	Report	Higl 33'

Štadión pod Zoborom, Nitra
Attendance: 8,556
Referee: Dragiša Komadinić (Yugoslavia)

Köln won 5–1 on aggregate.

26 September 1989

Feyenoord (Netherlands)	2–1	(West Germany) Stuttgart
Keur 21' van Geel 52' (pen.)	Report	Sigurvinsson 66'

De Kuip, Rotterdam
Attendance: 21,736
Referee: José Rosa dos Santos (Portugal)

Stuttgart won 3–2 on aggregate.

26 September 1989

Hamburg (West Germany)	5–1	(Sweden) Örgryte
von Heesen 25'; Beiersdorfer 35'; Furtok 79'; Eck 88'; Fischer 89'	Report	Grandelius 76'

Volksparkstadion, Hamburg
Attendance: 10,000
Referee: Michał Listkiewicz (Poland)

Hamburg won 7–2 on aggregate.

26 September 1989

Dundalk (Republic of Ireland)	0–2	(Switzerland) Wettingen
	Report	Löbmann 42', 53'

Oriel Park, Dundalk
Attendance: 1,361
Referee: Douglas Hope (Scotland)

Wettingen won 5–0 on aggregate.

26 September 1989

Red Star Belgrade (Socialist Federal Republic of Yugoslavia)	2–0	(Turkey) Galatasaray
Lukić 3'; Pančev 66'	Report

Marakana, Belgrade
Attendance: 46,866
Referee: Joaquín Ramos Marcos (Spain)

Red Star Belgrade won 3–1 on aggregate.

26 September 1989

MTK (Hungary)	1–2	(Soviet Union) Dynamo Kyiv
Jován 87'	Report	Zayets 10'; Salenko 88'

Hungária körúti stadion, Budapest
Attendance: 4,152
Referee: Gerasimos Germanakos (Greece)

Dynamo Kyiv won 6–1 on aggregate.

26 September 1989

Næstved (Denmark)	0–0	(Soviet Union) Zenit Leningrad
	Report

Næstved Stadion, Næstved
Attendance: 4,182
Referee: Rune Larsson (Sweden)

Zenit Leningrad won 3–1 on aggregate.

26 September 1989

IFK Göteborg (Sweden)	1–0	(Soviet Union) Žalgiris Vilnius
M. Nilsson 53'	Report

Ullevi, Gothenburg
Attendance: 4,670
Referee: John Lloyd (Wales)

Žalgiris Vilnius won 2–1 on aggregate.

26 September 1989

Olympiacos (Greece)	2–0	(Socialist Federal Republic of Yugoslavia) Rad
Détári 35'; Anastopoulos 76'	Report

Karaiskakis Stadium, Piraeus
Attendance: 26,052
Referee: Carlo Longhi (Italy)

Olympiacos won 3–2 on aggregate.

26 September 1989

Boavista (Portugal)	2–2 (a.e.t.)	(East Germany) Karl-Marx-Stadt
João Pinto 40', 91'	Report	Heidrich 104'; Mehlhorn 119'

Estádio do Bessa, Porto
Attendance: 6,820
Referee: Alain Delmer (France)

Karl-Marx-Stadt won 3–2 on aggregate.

26 September 1989

Baník Ostrava (Czechoslovakia)	4–0	(East Germany) Hansa Rostock
Nečas 28'; Chýlek 43'; Záleský 83'; Pěcháček 77'	Report

Bazaly, Ostrava
Attendance: 8,140
Referee: Vadim Zhuk (Soviet Union)

Baník Ostrava won 7–2 on aggregate.

== Second round ==
Team 1	Agg.	Team 2	1st leg	2nd leg
First Vienna (Austria)	3–3 (a)	(Greece) Olympiacos	2–2	1–1
Antwerp (Belgium)	6–3	(Scotland) Dundee United	4–0	2–3
Club Brugge (Belgium)	4–6	(Austria) Rapid Wien	1–2	3–4
Hibernian (Scotland)	0–1	(Belgium) RFC Liège	0–0	0–1 (a.e.t.)
Zaragoza (Spain)	1–2	(West Germany) Hamburg	1–0	0–2 (a.e.t.)
RoPS (Finland)	0–8	(France) Auxerre	0–5	0–3
Paris Saint-Germain (France)	1–3	(Italy) Juventus	0–1	1–2
Fiorentina (Italy)	1–1 (a)	(France) Sochaux	0–0	1–1
Porto (Portugal)	5–4	(Spain) Valencia	3–1	2–3
Werder Bremen (West Germany)	5–2	Austria Wien	5–0	0–2
Köln (West Germany)	3–1	(Soviet Union) Spartak Moscow	3–1	0–0
Sion (Switzerland)	3–5	(East Germany) Karl-Marx-Stadt	2–1	1–4
Wettingen (Switzerland)	1–2	(Italy) Napoli	0–0	1–2
Dynamo Kyiv (Soviet Union)	4–1	(Czechoslovakia) Baník Ostrava	3–0	1–1
Zenit Leningrad (Soviet Union)	0–6	(West Germany) Stuttgart	0–1	0–5
Red Star Belgrade (Socialist Federal Republic of Yugoslavia)	5–1	(Soviet Union) Žalgiris Vilnius	4–1	1–0

=== First leg ===
17 October 1989

First Vienna (Austria)	2–2	(Greece) Olympiacos
Niederstrasser 27'; Haiden 84'	Report	Tsalouchidis 35'; Alexiou 70'

Stadion Hohe Warte, Vienna
Attendance: 3,400
Referee: Dimitar Dimitrov (Bulgaria)

17 October 1989

Antwerp (Belgium)	4–0	(Scotland) Dundee United
Geilenkirchen 22'; Van Rooij 23', 31'; Claesen 47'	Report

Bosuilstadion, Antwerp
Attendance: 6,822
Referee: Ivan Grégr (Czechoslovakia)

17 October 1989

Club Brugge (Belgium)	1–2	(Austria) Rapid Wien
Christiaens 23'	Report	Keglevits 87'; Pfeifenberger 90'

Olympiastadion, Bruges
Attendance: 17,993
Referee: David Syme (Scotland)

17 October 1989

Hibernian (Scotland)	0–0	(Belgium) RFC Liège
	Report

Easter Road, Edinburgh
Attendance: 18,010
Referee: Cees Bakker (Netherlands)

17 October 1989

Zaragoza (Spain)	1–0	(West Germany) Hamburg
Sirakov 88'	Report

Estadio La Romareda, Zaragoza
Attendance: 15,000
Referee: Friedrich Kaupe (Austria)

17 October 1989

RoPS (Finland)	0–5	(France) Auxerre
	Report	Otokoré 1'; Scifo 64', 69'; Guerreiro 84'; Cocard 88'

Rovaniemen keskuskenttä, Rovaniemi
Attendance: 4,036
Referee: Klaus Peschel (East Germany)

17 October 1989

Paris Saint-Germain (France)	0–1	(Italy) Juventus
	Report	Rui Barros 65'

Parc des Princes, Paris
Attendance: 30,699
Referee: John Blankenstein (Netherlands)

17 October 1989

Fiorentina (Italy)	0–0	(France) Sochaux
	Report

Stadio Renato Curi, Perugia
Attendance: 16,010
Referee: Lajos Németh (Hungary)

17 October 1989

Porto (Portugal)	3–1	(Spain) Valencia
Águas 7', 48'; Madjer 70'	Report	Arroyo 62'

Estádio das Antas, Porto
Attendance: 22,500
Referee: Michel Girard (France)

17 October 1989

Werder Bremen (West Germany)	5–0	Austria Wien
Neubarth 14'; Hermann 23'; Riedle 58'; Rufer 73'; Kutzop 76'	Report

Weserstadion, Bremen
Attendance: 15,178
Referee: Einar Halle (Norway)

17 October 1989

Köln (West Germany)	3–1	(Soviet Union) Spartak Moscow
Sturm 33'; Görtz 40'; Ordenewitz 71'	Report	Cherenkov 31'

Müngersdorfer Stadion, Cologne
Attendance: 22,000
Referee: John Spillane (Republic of Ireland)

17 October 1989

Sion (Switzerland)	2–1	(East Germany) Karl-Marx-Stadt
Brigger 49'; Piffaretti 66'	Report	Laudeley 25'

Stade de Tourbillon, Sion
Attendance: 10,354
Referee: Rosario Lo Bello (Italy)

17 October 1989

Wettingen (Switzerland)	0–0	(Italy) Napoli
	Report

Letzigrund, Zürich
Attendance: 13,000
Referee: Ion Crăciunescu (Romania)

17 October 1989

Dynamo Kyiv (Soviet Union)	3–0	(Czechoslovakia) Baník Ostrava
Mykhaylychenko 33'; Bezsonov 54'; Lytovchenko 79'	Report

Republican Stadium, Kyiv
Attendance: 50,000
Referee: Ioan Igna (Romania)

17 October 1989

Zenit Leningrad (Soviet Union)	0–1	(West Germany) Stuttgart
	Report	Allgöwer 87'

Kirov Stadium, Leningrad
Attendance: 33,000
Referee: Howard King (Wales)

17 October 1989

Red Star Belgrade (Socialist Federal Republic of Yugoslavia)	4–1	(Soviet Union) Žalgiris Vilnius
Savićević 30'; Kanatlarovski 31'; Pančev 33'; Drizić 56'	Report	Ivanauskas 67'

Marakana, Belgrade
Attendance: 48,989
Referee: Vassilios Nikakis (Greece)

=== Second leg ===
31 October 1989

Olympiacos (Greece)	1–1	(Austria) First Vienna
Détári 53'	Report	Jenisch 57'

Karaiskakis Stadium, Piraeus
Attendance: 31,116
Referee: José Pérez Sánchez (Spain)

3–3 on aggregate; Olympiacos won on away goals.

31 October 1989

Dundee United (Scotland)	3–2	(Belgium) Antwerp
Paatelainen 42'; O'Neill 62'; Clark 89'	Report	Lehnhoff 19'; Claesen 22'

Tannadice Park, Dundee
Attendance: 8,994
Referee: Ulf Eriksson (Sweden)

Antwerp won 6–3 on aggregate.

31 October 1989

Rapid Wien (Austria)	4–3	(Belgium) Club Brugge
Fjørtoft 52'; Keglevits 71', 87'; Pfeifenberger 84'	Report	Farina 18'; Ceulemans 81' (pen.); Booy 90+2'

Gerhard-Hanappi-Stadion, Vienna
Attendance: 18,000
Referee: Carlo Longhi (Italy)

Rapid Wien won 6–4 on aggregate.

31 October 1989

RFC Liège (Belgium)	1–0 (a.e.t.)	(Scotland) Hibernian
De Sart 105'	Report

Stade Vélodrome de Rocourt, Liège
Attendance: 9,570
Referee: Ildefonso Urizar Azpitarte (Spain)

RFC Liège won 1–0 on aggregate.

31 October 1989

Hamburg (West Germany)	2–0 (a.e.t.)	(Spain) Zaragoza
Merkle 69', 96'	Report

Volksparkstadion, Hamburg
Attendance: 18,500
Referee: Alphonse Costantin (Belgium)

Hamburg won 2–1 on aggregate.

31 October 1989

Auxerre (France)	3–0	(Finland) RoPS
Scifo 4' (pen.); Dutuel 66'; Darras 77'	Report

Stade de l'Abbé-Deschamps, Auxerre
Attendance: 5,222
Referee: Carlos Silva Valente (Portugal)

Auxerre won 8–0 on aggregate.

31 October 1989

Juventus (Italy)	2–1	(France) Paris Saint-Germain
Galia 26'; Bosser 83' (o.g.)	Report	Bravo 30'

Stadio Comunale Vittorio Pozzo, Turin
Attendance: 41,306
Referee: George Courtney (England)

Juventus won 3–1 on aggregate.

31 October 1989

Sochaux (France)	1–1	(Italy) Fiorentina
Laurey 36'	Report	Buso 32'

Stade Auguste-Bonal, Montbéliard
Attendance: 15,928
Referee: Emilio Soriano Aladrén (Spain)

1–1 on aggregate; Fiorentina won on away goals.

31 October 1989

Valencia (Spain)	3–2	(Portugal) Porto
Fenoll 39', 62', 89'	Report	Madjer 43'; Jorge Couto 80'

Estadio Luis Casanova, Valencia
Attendance: 38,000
Referee: George Smith (Scotland)

Porto won 5–4 on aggregate.

31 October 1989

Austria Wien	2–0	(West Germany) Werder Bremen
Hasenhüttl 9', 80'	Report

Franz-Horr-Stadion, Vienna
Attendance: 1,500
Referee: Gérard Biguet (France)

Werder Bremen won 5–2 on aggregate.

31 October 1989

Spartak Moscow (Soviet Union)	0–0	(West Germany) Köln
	Report

Central Lenin Stadium, Moscow
Attendance: 50,000
Referee: Thorodd Presberg (Norway)

Köln won 3–1 on aggregate.

31 October 1989

Karl-Marx-Stadt (East Germany)	4–1	(Switzerland) Sion
Ziffert 11'; Steinmann 29' (pen.); Wienhold 41'; Laudeley 64'	Report	Cina 79'

Ernst-Thälmann-Stadion, Karl-Marx-Stadt
Attendance: 20,800
Referee: Alan Snoddy (Northern Ireland)

Karl-Marx-Stadt won 5–3 on aggregate.

31 October 1989

Napoli (Italy)	2–1	(Switzerland) Wettingen
Baroni 47'; Mauro 74' (pen.)	Report	Bertelsen 14'

Stadio San Paolo, Naples
Attendance: 47,334
Referee: Edgar Azzopardi (Malta)

Napoli won 2–1 on aggregate.

31 October 1989

Baník Ostrava (Czechoslovakia)	1–1	(Soviet Union) Dynamo Kyiv
Chýlek 35'	Report	Bezsonov 2'

Bazaly, Ostrava
Attendance: 11,058
Referee: Dušan Čolić (Yugoslavia)

Dynamo Kyiv won 4–1 on aggregate.

31 October 1989

Stuttgart (West Germany)	5–0	(Soviet Union) Zenit Leningrad
Walter 27'; Sigurvinsson 41', 44'; Allgöwer 43'; Buchwald 49'	Report

Neckarstadion, Stuttgart
Attendance: 13,000
Referee: İhsan Türe (Turkey)

Stuttgart won 6–0 on aggregate.

31 October 1989

Žalgiris Vilnius (Soviet Union)	0–1	(Socialist Federal Republic of Yugoslavia) Red Star Belgrade
	Report	Prosinečki 70'

Žalgiris Stadium, Vilnius
Attendance: 13,300
Referee: Lajos Hartmann (Hungary)

Red Star Belgrade won 5–1 on aggregate.

== Third round ==
Team 1	Agg.	Team 2	1st leg	2nd leg
Rapid Wien (Austria)	2–3	(Belgium) RFC Liège	1–0	1–3
Antwerp (Belgium)	2–1	(West Germany) Stuttgart	1–0	1–1
Olympiacos (Greece)	1–1 (a)	(France) Auxerre	1–1	0–0
Fiorentina (Italy)	1–0	(Soviet Union) Dynamo Kyiv	1–0	0–0
Napoli (Italy)	3–8	(West Germany) Werder Bremen	2–3	1–5
Juventus (Italy)	3–1	(East Germany) Karl-Marx-Stadt	2–1	1–0
Hamburg (West Germany)	2–2 (a)	(Portugal) Porto	1–0	1–2
Red Star Belgrade (Socialist Federal Republic of Yugoslavia)	2–3	(West Germany) Köln	2–0	0–3

=== First leg ===
21 November 1989

Antwerp (Belgium)	1–0	(West Germany) Stuttgart
Lehnhoff 10'	Report

Bosuilstadion, Antwerp
Attendance: 9,915
Referee: Alexey Spirin (Soviet Union)

22 November 1989

Rapid Wien (Austria)	1–0	(Belgium) RFC Liège
Kranjčar 47'	Report

Gerhard-Hanappi-Stadion, Vienna
Attendance: 15,500
Referee: Carlos Silva Valente (Portugal)

22 November 1989

Olympiacos (Greece)	1–1	(France) Auxerre
Anastopoulos 30'	Report	Kovács 19'

Karaiskakis Stadium, Piraeus
Attendance: 29,683
Referee: John Blankenstein (Netherlands)

22 November 1989

Fiorentina (Italy)	1–0	(Soviet Union) Dynamo Kyiv
Baggio 77' (pen.)	Report

Stadio Renato Curi, Perugia
Attendance: 22,533
Referee: Karl-Heinz Tritschler (West Germany)

22 November 1989

Napoli (Italy)	2–3	(West Germany) Werder Bremen
Alemão 52'; Careca 65'	Report	Neubarth 41'; Riedle 46'; Rufer 90'

Stadio San Paolo, Naples
Attendance: 43,329
Referee: Bo Karlsson (Sweden)

22 November 1989

Juventus (Italy)	2–1	(East Germany) Karl-Marx-Stadt
Schillaci 82'; Casiraghi 88'	Report	Wienhold 70'

Stadio Comunale Vittorio Pozzo, Turin
Attendance: 17,426
Referee: Guy Goethals (Belgium)

22 November 1989

Hamburg (West Germany)	1–0	(Portugal) Porto
von Heesen 48'	Report

Volksparkstadion, Hamburg
Attendance: 18,200
Referee: Tullio Lanese (Italy)

22 November 1989

Red Star Belgrade (Socialist Federal Republic of Yugoslavia)	2–0	(West Germany) Köln
Savićević 76', 80'	Report

Marakana, Belgrade
Attendance: 62,141
Referee: Gérard Biguet (France)

=== Second leg ===
5 December 1989

Stuttgart (West Germany)	1–1	(Belgium) Antwerp
Frontzeck 51'	Report	Broeckaert 60'

Neckarstadion, Stuttgart
Attendance: 16,000
Referee: Zoran Petrović (Yugoslavia)

Antwerp won 2–1 on aggregate.

6 December 1989

RFC Liège (Belgium)	3–1	(Austria) Rapid Wien
Waseige 5'; Ernès 34'; Boffin 45'	Report	Fjørtoft 80'

Stade Vélodrome de Rocourt, Liège
Attendance: 6,628
Referee: Lajos Németh (Hungary)

RFC Liège won 3–2 on aggregate.

6 December 1989

Auxerre (France)	0–0	(Greece) Olympiacos
	Report

Stade de l'Abbé-Deschamps, Auxerre
Attendance: 14,500
Referee: Dieter Pauly (West Germany)

1–1 on aggregate; Auxerre won on away goals.

6 December 1989

Dynamo Kyiv (Soviet Union)	0–0	(Italy) Fiorentina
	Report

Republican Stadium, Kyiv
Attendance: 61,289
Referee: Joe Worrall (England)

Fiorentina won 1–0 on aggregate.

6 December 1989

Werder Bremen (West Germany)	5–1	(Italy) Napoli
Riedle 24', 62'; Rufer 55'; Sauer 88'; Eilts 90'	Report	Careca 70'

Weserstadion, Bremen
Attendance: 37,360
Referee: Emilio Soriano Aladrén (Spain)

Werder Bremen won 8–3 on aggregate.

6 December 1989

Karl-Marx-Stadt (East Germany)	0–1	(Italy) Juventus
	Report	De Agostini 20'

Ernst-Thälmann-Stadion, Karl-Marx-Stadt
Attendance: 27,800
Referee: George Smith (Scotland)

Juventus won 3–1 on aggregate.

6 December 1989

Porto (Portugal)	2–1	(West Germany) Hamburg
Nascimento 45'; Jorge Couto 63'	Report	Eck 42'

Estádio das Antas, Porto
Attendance: 26,000
Referee: Kurt Röthlisberger (Switzerland)

2–2 on aggregate; Hamburg won on away goals.

6 December 1989

Köln (West Germany)	3–0	(Socialist Federal Republic of Yugoslavia) Red Star Belgrade
Götz 59', 83'; Ordenewitz 90'	Report

Müngersdorfer Stadion, Cologne
Attendance: 36,000
Referee: Jozef Marko (Czechoslovakia)

Köln won 3–2 on aggregate.

== Quarter-finals ==
Team 1	Agg.	Team 2	1st leg	2nd leg
RFC Liège (Belgium)	3–4	(West Germany) Werder Bremen	1–4	2–0
Fiorentina (Italy)	2–0	(France) Auxerre	1–0	1–0
Köln (West Germany)	2–0	(Belgium) Antwerp	2–0	0–0
Hamburg (West Germany)	2–3	(Italy) Juventus	0–2	2–1

=== First leg ===
7 March 1990

RFC Liège (Belgium)	1–4	(West Germany) Werder Bremen
Varga 40'	Report	Bockenfeld 32'; Riedle 35', 68'; Rufer 39'

Stade Vélodrome de Rocourt, Liège
Attendance: 9,239
Referee: Rodger Gifford (Wales)

7 March 1990

Fiorentina (Italy)	1–0	(France) Auxerre
Volpecina 6'	Report

Stadio Renato Curi, Perugia
Attendance: 17,537
Referee: Erik Fredriksson (Sweden)

7 March 1990

Köln (West Germany)	2–0	(Belgium) Antwerp
Littbarski 2'; Giske 53'	Report

Müngersdorfer Stadion, Cologne
Attendance: 26,000
Referee: Neil Midgley (England)

7 March 1990

Hamburg (West Germany)	0–2	(Italy) Juventus
	Report	Schillaci 50'; Casiraghi 57'

Volksparkstadion, Hamburg
Attendance: 42,900
Referee: Bo Karlsson (Sweden)

=== Second leg ===
21 March 1990

Werder Bremen (West Germany)	0–2	(Belgium) RFC Liège
	Report	De Sart 25'; Milošević 80' (pen.)

Weserstadion, Bremen
Attendance: 25,760
Referee: Carlo Longhi (Italy)

Werder Bremen won 4–3 on aggregate.

21 March 1990

Auxerre (France)	0–1	(Italy) Fiorentina
	Report	Nappi 78'

Stade de l'Abbé-Deschamps, Auxerre
Attendance: 18,072
Referee: George Smith (Scotland)

Fiorentina won 2–0 on aggregate.

21 March 1990

Antwerp (Belgium)	0–0	(West Germany) Köln
	Report

Bosuilstadion, Antwerp
Attendance: 17,060
Referee: Emilio Soriano Aladrén (Spain)

Köln won 2–0 on aggregate.

21 March 1990

Juventus (Italy)	1–2	(West Germany) Hamburg
Galia 34'	Report	Furtok 72'; Merkle 78'

Stadio Comunale Vittorio Pozzo, Turin
Attendance: 42,977
Referee: Michel Vautrot (France)

Juventus won 3–2 on aggregate.

== Semi-finals ==
Team 1	Agg.	Team 2	1st leg	2nd leg
Juventus (Italy)	3–2	(West Germany) Köln	3–2	0–0
Werder Bremen (West Germany)	1–1 (a)	(Italy) Fiorentina	1–1	0–0

=== First leg ===
3 April 1990

Werder Bremen (West Germany)	1–1	(Italy) Fiorentina
Landucci 90' (o.g.)	Report	Nappi 78'

Weserstadion, Bremen
Attendance: 24,000
Referee: Peter Mikkelsen (Denmark)

4 April 1990

Juventus (Italy)	3–2	(West Germany) Köln
Rui Barros 22'; Higl 45' (o.g.); Marocchi 53'	Report	Götz 80'; Sturm 90'

Stadio Comunale Vittorio Pozzo, Turin
Attendance: 41,870
Referee: Helmut Kohl (Austria)

=== Second leg ===
17 April 1990

Fiorentina (Italy)	0–0	(West Germany) Werder Bremen
	Report

Stadio Renato Curi, Perugia
Attendance: 25,787
Referee: Gérard Biguet (France)

1–1 on aggregate; Fiorentina won on away goals.

18 April 1990

Köln (West Germany)	0–0	(Italy) Juventus
	Report

Müngersdorfer Stadion, Cologne
Attendance: 51,000
Referee: Zoran Petrović (Yugoslavia)

Juventus won 3–2 on aggregate.

== Final ==
=== First leg ===
2 May 1990

Juventus (Italy)	3–1	(Italy) Fiorentina
Galia 3'; Casiraghi 59'; De Agostini 73'	Report	Buso 10'

Stadio Comunale Vittorio Pozzo, Turin
Attendance: 47,519
Referee: Emilio Soriano Aladrén (Spain)

=== Second leg ===
16 May 1990

Fiorentina (Italy)	0–0	(Italy) Juventus
	Report

Stadio Partenio, Avellino
Attendance: 30,999
Referee: Aron Schmidhuber (West Germany)

Juventus won 3–1 on aggregate.
