= 1989–90 in Swiss football =

Football in Switzerland
- Season: 1989–90

Men's football
- Nationalliga A: Grasshopper Club
- Nationalliga B: No team was declared champions
- 1. Liga: Overall; Urania Genève Sport; Group 1: Urania; Group 2: Thun; Group 3: Kriens; Group 4: Brühl
- Swiss Cup: Grasshopper Club

Women's football
- Swiss Women's Super League: SV Seebach Zürich
- Swiss Cup: SV Seebach Zürich

The following is a summary of the 1989–90 season of competitive football in Switzerland.

== Nationalliga A ==
=== Qualification phase ===
Pos	Team	Pld	W	D	L	GF	GA	GD	Pts	Qualification
1	St. Gallen	22	9	10	3	40	24	+16	37	Advance to championship round halved points (rounded up) as bonus
2	Xamax	22	11	5	6	38	32	+6	38	Advance to championship round halved points (rounded up) as bonus
3	Grasshopper Club	22	9	7	6	31	24	+7	34	Advance to championship round halved points (rounded up) as bonus
4	Luzern	22	9	6	7	39	29	+10	33	Advance to championship round halved points (rounded up) as bonus
5	Sion	22	9	5	8	29	31	−2	32	Advance to championship round halved points (rounded up) as bonus
6	Lausanne-Sport	22	6	10	6	28	27	+1	28	Advance to championship round halved points (rounded up) as bonus
7	Lugano	22	8	6	8	36	35	+1	30	Advance to championship round halved points (rounded up) as bonus
8	Young Boys	22	7	7	8	29	29	0	28	Advance to championship round halved points (rounded up) as bonus
9	Servette	22	7	7	8	34	36	−2	28	Continue to promotion/relegation round
10	Wettingen	22	7	5	10	18	27	−9	26	Continue to promotion/relegation round
11	Aarau	22	5	7	10	20	30	−10	22	Continue to promotion/relegation round
12	Bellinzona	22	5	5	12	31	49	−18	20	Continue to promotion/relegation round

Source: RSSSF
Rules for classification: 1) Points; 2) Goal difference; 3) Goals scored; 4) Head-to-head points; 5) Away goals scored; 6) Draw.

=== Championship group ===
The first eight teams of the qualification phase competed in the Championship round. The teams took half of the points (rounded up to complete units) gained in the qualification as bonus with them.

Pos	Team	Pld	W	D	L	GF	GA	GD	BP	Pts	Qualification
1	Grasshopper Club	14	9	0	5	28	15	+13	13	31	Swiss champions, qualified for 1990–91 European Cup and entered 1990 Intertoto Cup
2	Lausanne-Sport	14	7	6	1	23	9	+14	11	31	Qualified for 1990–91 UEFA Cup
3	Xamax	14	5	6	3	18	14	+4	14	30	as Swiss Cup finalist qualified for 1990–91 Cup Winners' Cup and entered 1990 Intertoto Cup
4	Luzern	14	6	4	4	20	22	−2	12	28	Qualified for 1990–91 UEFA Cup and entered 1990 Intertoto Cup
5	St. Gallen	14	4	5	5	19	15	+4	14	27	Entered 1990 Intertoto Cup
6	Lugano	14	4	4	6	11	23	−12	11	23	
7	Young Boys	14	2	6	6	11	20	−9	11	21	
8	Sion	14	1	5	8	10	22	−12	12	19	

Source: RSSSF
Rules for classification: 1) points; 2) Position in the qualification.
Note: Grasshopper Club champions due to better record in preliminary stage.

== Nationalliga B ==
=== Qualification phase ===
Group East

Pos	Team	Pld	W	D	L	GF	GA	GD	Pts	Qualification
1	FC Baden	22	14	4	4	46	25	+21	32	Promotion round
2	FC Zürich	22	13	4	5	45	24	+21	30	Promotion round
3	FC Winterthur	22	12	5	5	45	30	+15	29	Promotion round
4	FC Schaffhausen	22	8	10	4	36	26	+10	26	Promotion round
5	FC Locarno	22	7	10	5	36	31	+5	24	Promotion round
6	FC Chur	22	7	9	6	28	26	+2	23	Promotion round
7	FC Chiasso	22	8	6	8	24	27	−3	22	Promotion round
8	FC Emmenbrücke	22	6	6	10	38	40	−2	18	Promotion round
9	SC Zug	22	4	10	8	28	39	−11	18	Relegation round
10	FC Glarus	22	3	9	10	27	41	−14	15	Relegation round
11	FC Zug	22	4	6	12	23	52	−29	14	Relegation round
12	FC Brüttisellen	22	5	3	14	33	48	−15	13	Relegation round

Source: RSSSF
Rules for classification: 1) Points; 2) Goal difference; 3) Goals scored; 4) Head-to-head points; 5) Away goals scored; 6) Draw.

Group West

Pos	Team	Pld	W	D	L	GF	GA	GD	Pts	Qualification
1	FC Fribourg	22	13	5	4	43	38	+5	31	Promotion round
2	FC Bulle	22	12	6	4	46	23	+23	30	Promotion round
3	Yverdon-Sport FC	22	10	8	4	39	21	+18	28	Promotion round
4	CS Chênois	22	10	7	5	38	24	+14	27	Promotion round
5	FC Basel	22	11	5	6	40	29	+11	27	Promotion round
6	FC Grenchen	22	8	9	5	38	21	+17	25	Promotion round
7	Etoile Carouge FC	22	9	4	9	35	35	0	22	Promotion round
8	FC La Chaux-de-Fonds	22	8	3	11	41	37	+4	19	Promotion round
9	FC Montreux-Sports	22	5	8	9	27	38	−11	18	Relegation round
10	BSC Old Boys	22	5	6	11	27	40	−13	16	Relegation round
11	ES Malley	22	3	5	14	18	53	−35	11	Relegation round
12	FC Martigny-Sports	22	1	8	13	26	59	−33	10	Relegation round

Source: RSSSF
Rules for classification: 1) Points; 2) Goal difference; 3) Goals scored; 4) Head-to-head points; 5) Away goals scored; 6) Draw.

=== Promotion/relegation round ===
Group A

Pos	Team	Pld	W	D	L	GF	GA	GD	Pts	Qualification
1	Servette	14	8	4	2	29	13	+16	20	Remain in Nationalliga A 1990–91
2	Zürich	14	8	4	2	30	17	+13	20	Promoted to Nationalliga A 1990–91
3	Basel	14	6	5	3	27	17	+10	17	Remain in NLB 1990–91
4	Bellinzona	14	5	5	4	19	16	+3	15	Relegated to NLB 1990–91
5	Yverdon-Sports	14	3	7	4	14	16	−2	13	Remain in NLB 1990–91
6	Fribourg	14	4	3	7	17	27	−10	11	Remain in NLB 1990–91
7	Chur	14	3	3	8	9	21	−12	9	Remain in NLB 1990–91
8	Schaffhausen	14	2	3	9	15	33	−18	7	Remain in NLB 1990–91

Source: RSSSF

Group B

Pos	Team	Pld	W	D	L	GF	GA	GD	Pts	Qualification
1	Aarau	14	10	2	2	35	10	+25	22	Remain in Nationalliga A 1990–91
2	Wettingen	14	9	4	1	29	9	+20	22	Remain in Nationalliga A 1990–91
3	Bulle	14	6	5	3	24	18	+6	17	Remain in NLB 1990–91
4	Baden	14	6	4	4	31	25	+6	16	Remain in NLB 1990–91
5	Locarno	14	4	5	5	15	17	−2	13	Remain in NLB 1990–91
6	Grenchen	14	2	5	7	18	28	−10	9	Remain in NLB 1990–91
7	Winterthur	14	2	3	9	15	38	−23	7	Remain in NLB 1990–91
8	Chênois	14	1	4	9	12	34	−22	6	Remain in NLB 1990–91

Source: RSSSF

=== Relegation round NLB/1. Liga ===
The last six teams in each of the two qualification phase groups competed in two relegation groups against relegation to the 1. Liga 1991–92. The teams received ranking bonus points from their qualifying groups (7th place 6 pts; 8th place 5 pts; 9th place 4 pts; etc). There was to be one direct relegation in each group, plus a play-out against relegation between both second last placed teams.

Group A

Pos	Team	Pld	W	D	L	GF	GA	GD	BP	Pts	Qualification
1	Etoile Carouge FC	10	5	5	0	19	8	+11	6	21	Remain in NLB 1990–91
2	FC Glarus	10	2	7	1	11	10	+1	3	14	Remain in NLB 1990–91
3	FC Emmenbrücke	10	1	7	2	14	15	−1	5	14	Remain in NLB 1990–91
4	ES FC Malley	10	4	2	4	13	16	−3	2	12	Remain in NLB 1990–91
5	FC Montreux-Sports	10	2	4	4	14	18	−4	4	12	Play-out against relegation
6	FC Brüttisellen	10	1	5	4	11	15	−4	1	8	Relegated to 1990–91 1. Liga

Source: RSSSF
Rules for classification: 1) Points; 2) Goal difference; 3) Goals scored; 4) Head-to-head points; 5) Away goals scored; 6) Draw.

Group B

Pos	Team	Pld	W	D	L	GF	GA	GD	BP	Pts	Qualification
1	FC La Chaux-de-Fonds	10	5	3	2	18	14	+4	5	18	Remain in NLB 1990–91
2	FC Chiasso	10	3	5	2	21	12	+9	6	17	Remain in NLB 1990–91
3	BSC Old Boys	10	2	6	2	14	12	+2	3	13	Remain in NLB 1990–91
4	SC Zug	10	3	3	4	13	19	−6	4	13	Remain in NLB 1990–91
5	FC Zug	10	2	5	3	7	12	−5	2	11	Play-out against relegation
6	FC Martigny-Sports	10	1	6	3	17	21	−4	1	9	Relegated to 1990–91 1. Liga

Source: RSSSF
Rules for classification: 1) Points; 2) Goal difference; 3) Goals scored; 4) Head-to-head points; 5) Away goals scored; 6) Draw.

=== Relegation play-out ===
Team 1	Score	Team 2
FC Zug	0–2	FC Montreux-Sports
FC Montreux-Sports	5–1	FC Zug

FC Montreux-Sports won 7–1 on aggregate and FC Zug were relegated to 1990–91 1. Liga.

== 1. Liga ==
=== Group 1 ===
Pos	Team	Pld	W	D	L	GF	GA	GD	Pts	Qualification or relegation
1	Urania Genève Sport	26	17	6	3	59	27	+32	40	Play-off to Nationalliga B
2	Concordia/Folgore Lausanne	26	14	9	3	49	24	+25	37	Play-off to Nationalliga B
3	FC Châtel-Saint-Denis	26	13	5	8	44	35	+9	31	
4	FC Renens	26	13	3	10	54	47	+7	29	
5	FC Monthey	26	10	8	8	50	39	+11	28	
6	FC Fully	26	10	7	9	39	41	−2	27	
7	FC Aigle	26	11	4	11	42	38	+4	26	
8	FC Beauregard Fribourg	26	10	5	11	39	32	+7	25	
9	Vevey Sports	26	8	8	10	34	37	−3	24	
10	FC Collex-Bossy	26	6	12	8	28	38	−10	24	
11	FC Echallens	26	7	8	11	40	51	−11	22	
12	FC Raron	26	7	7	12	32	44	−12	21	Play-out against relegation
13	FC Stade Nyonnais	26	4	7	15	33	60	−27	15	Relegation to 2. Liga Interregional
14	FC Bramois	26	6	3	17	37	67	−30	15	Relegation to 2. Liga Interregional

Source: RSSSF
Rules for classification: 1) Points; 2) Goal difference within the league, but decider play-off for qualifiers.

=== Group 2 ===
Pos	Team	Pld	W	D	L	GF	GA	GD	Pts	Qualification or relegation
1	FC Thun	26	17	6	3	67	33	+34	40	Play-off to Nationalliga B
2	FC Münsingen	26	15	6	5	46	27	+19	36	Play-off to Nationalliga B
3	SR Delémont	26	13	8	5	58	24	+34	34	
4	SV Lyss	26	13	7	6	36	22	+14	33	
5	FC Bern	26	11	8	7	41	35	+6	30	
6	FC Laufen	26	10	7	9	33	26	+7	27	
7	FC Colombier	26	10	5	11	41	42	−1	25	
8	FC Domdidier	26	8	8	10	38	46	−8	24	
9	FC Moutier	26	9	5	12	37	49	−12	23	
10	FC Le Locle	26	6	9	11	23	30	−7	21	
11	FC Lerchenfeld	26	7	6	13	38	44	−6	20	
12	FC Breitenbach	26	7	4	15	35	59	−24	18	Play-out against relegation
13	FC Biel-Bienne	26	5	7	14	24	54	−30	17	Relegation to 2. Liga Interregional
14	FC Boudry	26	4	8	14	20	46	−26	16	Relegation to 2. Liga Interregional

Source: RSSSF
Rules for classification: 1) Points; 2) Goal difference within the league, but decider play-off for qualifiers.

=== Group 3 ===
Pos	Team	Pld	W	D	L	GF	GA	GD	Pts	Qualification or relegation
1	SC Kriens	26	11	10	5	36	23	+13	32	Play-off to Nationalliga B
2	SC Burgdorf	26	11	9	6	41	30	+11	31	Play-off to Nationalliga B
3	FC Sursee	26	12	6	8	35	26	+9	30	
4	FC Ascona	26	10	8	8	31	27	+4	28	
5	FC Mendrisio	26	9	10	7	31	29	+2	28	
6	FC Solothurn	26	9	9	8	37	27	+10	27	
7	FC Tresa/Monteggio	26	9	9	8	33	35	−2	27	
8	FC Suhr	26	7	13	6	23	29	−6	27	
9	FC Pratteln	26	7	12	7	22	21	+1	26	
10	SC Buochs	26	6	13	7	30	28	+2	25	
11	FC Klus-Balsthal	26	7	10	9	29	35	−6	24	
12	FC Riehen	26	8	6	12	36	43	−7	22	Play-out against relegation
13	FC Muri	26	4	12	10	14	31	−17	20	Relegation to 2. Liga Interregional
14	SC Derendingen	26	7	3	16	28	42	−14	17	Relegation to 2. Liga Interregional

Source: RSSSF
Rules for classification: 1) Points; 2) Goal difference within the league, but decider play-off for qualifiers.

=== Group 4 ===
Pos	Team	Pld	W	D	L	GF	GA	GD	Pts	Qualification or relegation
1	SC Brühl	26	15	7	4	48	19	+29	37	Play-off to Nationalliga B
2	FC Rorschach	26	11	12	3	46	25	+21	34	Play-off to Nationalliga B
3	FC Tuggen	26	12	6	8	31	28	+3	30	
4	SC Veltheim	26	8	12	6	44	35	+9	28	
5	FC Red Star Zürich	26	10	7	9	41	26	+15	27	
6	FC Young Fellows Zürich	26	10	7	9	45	37	+8	27	
7	FC Kilchberg	26	10	6	10	35	35	0	26	
8	FC Kreuzlingen	26	8	10	8	42	43	−1	26	
9	FC Einsiedeln	26	8	9	9	28	33	−5	25	
10	FC Altstätten (St. Gallen)	26	8	8	10	37	34	+3	24	
11	FC Herisau	26	9	6	11	36	38	−2	24	
12	FC Vaduz	26	7	7	12	34	53	−19	21	Play-out against relegation
13	FC Landquart	26	6	6	14	24	56	−32	18	Relegation to 2. Liga Interregional
14	FC Wohlen	26	6	5	15	31	60	−29	17	Relegation to 2. Liga Interregional

Source: RSSSF
Rules for classification: 1) Points; 2) Goal difference within the league, but decider play-off for qualifiers.

=== Promotion play-off ===
Qualification round

Team 1	Score	Team 2
FC Münsingen	0–0	Urania Genève Sport
Urania Genève Sport	2–0	FC Münsingen

Urania Genève Sport win 2–0 on aggregate and continue to the finals.

Team 1	Score	Team 2
Concordia/Folgore Lausanne	1–1	FC Thun
FC Thun	0–2	Concordia/Folgore Lausanne

Concordia/Folgore Lausanne win 2–0 on aggregate and continue to the finals.

Team 1	Score	Team 2
SC Burgdorf	4–0	SC Brühl
SC Brühl	1–0	SC Burgdorf

SC Burgdorf win 4–1 on aggregate and continue to the finals.

Team 1	Score	Team 2
FC Rorschach	1–1	SC Kriens
SC Kriens	2–1	FC Rorschach

SC Kriens win 3–2 on aggregate and continue to the finals.

Final round

Team 1	Score	Team 2
SC Burgdorf	2–0	SC Kriens
SC Kriens	3–4	SC Burgdorf

SC Burgdorf win 6–3 on aggregate and are promoted to Nationalliga B.

Team 1	Score	Team 2
Urania Genève Sport	3–3	Concordia/Folgore Lausanne
Concordia/Folgore Lausanne	1–4	Urania Genève Sport

Urania Genève Sport win 7–4 on aggregate and are promoted to Nationalliga B.

Decider for third place

The play-off for the third promotion place was played on 16 June 1990 in Châtel-St-Denis.

Team 1	Score	Team 2
Concordia/Folgore Lausanne	3–2	SC Kriens

Concordia/Folgore Lausanne win, but refused promotion, so SC Kriens are promoted to Nationalliga B.

Decider for championship

The play-off for the 1. Liga championship was played on 16 June 1990 in Châtel-St-Denis.

Team 1	Score	Team 2
Urania Genève Sport	7–1	SC Burgdorf

Urania Genève Sport win and become 1. Liga champions.

=== Relegation play-out ===
First round

Team 1	Score	Team 2
FC Breitenbach	3–3 a.e.t. 4–3 pen.	FC Raron

FC Raron continue to the final.

Team 1	Score	Team 2
FC Riehen	2–2 a.e.t. 4–3 pen.	FC Vaduz

FC Vaduz continue to the final.

Final round

Team 1	Score	Team 2
FC Vaduz	0–1	FC Raron
FC Raron	3–3	FC Vaduz

FC Raron win 4–3 on aggregate and remain in the division. FC Vaduz are relegated to 2. Liga.

== Swiss Cup ==
=== Early rounds ===
The routes of the finalists to the final, played on 4 June 1990 at the Wankdorf in Bern:

Round 3

Team 1	Score	Team 2
2 September 1989
Étoile-Carouge FC	0–4	Neuchâtel Xamax
23 September 1989
FC Ascona	0–4	Grasshoppers

Round 4

Team 1	Score	Team 2
6 April 1990
FC Monthey	1–3	Neuchâtel Xamax
FC Suhr	0–1	Grasshoppers

Round 5

Team 1	Score	Team 2
22 April 1990
FC Chiasso	1–2	Neuchâtel Xamax
BSC Young Boys	0–2	Grasshoppers

Quarter-finals

Team 1	Score	Team 2
1 May 1990
Neuchâtel Xamax	2–1	FC St.Gallen
Grasshoppers	1–0	FC Basel

Semi-finals

Team 1	Score	Team 2
22 May 1990
FC Luzern	1–3	Grasshoppers
Neuchâtel Xamax	2–1	FC Lausanne-Sport

=== Final ===
4 June 1990
15:00

Grasshoppers	2 – 1	Neuchâtel Xamax
Wyss 24' de Vicente 69'	Report	40' Gigon

Wankdorf, Bern
Attendance: 27,000
Referee: (Switzerland) Rolf Blattmann (Zeiningen)

== Swiss Clubs in Europe ==
- Luzern as 1988–89 Nationalliga A champions: 1989–90 European Cup and entered 1989 Intertoto Cup
- Grasshopper Club as 1988–89 Swiss Cup winners: 1989–90 Cup Winners' Cup and entered 1989 Intertoto Cup
- Sion as league third placed team: 1989–90 UEFA Cup
- Wettingen as league fourth placed team: 1989–90 UEFA Cup and entered 1989 Intertoto Cup
- Bellinzona: entered 1989 Intertoto Cup

=== Luzern ===
==== European Cup ====
===== First round =====
13 September 1989 First leg	PSV Eindhoven (Netherlands)	3–0	(Switzerland) Luzern	Philips Stadion, Eindhoven
	Kieft 4'; Ellerman 54'; Romário 81'	Report		Attendance: 16,100; Referee: John Spillane (Republic of Ireland)

27 September 1989 Second leg	Luzern (Switzerland)	0–2	(Netherlands) PSV Eindhoven	Stadion Allmend, Lucerne
		Report	Romário 25', 32'	Attendance: 11,700; Referee: Joël Quiniou (France)

PSV Eindhoven won 5–0 on aggregate.

==== Intertoto Cup ====
===== Group 1 =====
Pos	Team	Pld	W	D	L	GF	GA	GD	Pts	LUZ	KAR	LIÈ	BOS
1	(Switzerland) Luzern	6	4	1	1	14	5	+9	9	—	2–0	2–0	5–0
2	(West Germany) Karlsruhe	6	4	1	1	14	9	+5	9	4–2	—	3–0	3–2
3	(Belgium) Liège	6	0	3	3	1	7	−6	3	0–0	1–1	—	0–0
4	(Netherlands) Den Bosch	6	1	1	4	6	14	−8	3	1–3	2–3	1–0	—

Source: Pawel Mogielnicki's Page
Rules for classification: 1) Points; 2) Goal difference; 3) Goals scored; 4) Head-to-head points; 5) Away goals scored; 6) Draw.

=== Grasshopper Club ===
==== Cup Winners' Cup ====
===== First round =====
12 September 1989 First leg	Slovan Bratislava (Czechoslovakia)	3–0	(Switzerland) Grasshopper	Tehelné pole, Bratislava
	Timko 35'; Vankovič 53' (pen.); Tittel 88' (pen.)	Report		Attendance: 12,817; Referee: Sadık Deda (Turkey)

26 September 1989 Second leg	Grasshopper (Switzerland)	4–0 (a.e.t.)	(Czechoslovakia) Slovan Bratislava	Hardturm, Zürich
	Gren 10', 115'; Egli 59' (pen.); Strudal 84'	Report		Attendance: 3,100; Referee: Günther Habermann (East Germany)

Grasshopper Club won 4–3 on aggregate.

===== Second round =====
18 October 1989 First leg	Torpedo Moscow (Soviet Union)	1–1	(Switzerland) Grasshopper	Torpedo Stadium, Moscow
	Y. Savichev 29'	Report	Strudal 88'	Attendance: 4,900; Referee: Timo Keltanen (Finland)

1 November 1989 Second leg	Grasshopper (Switzerland)	3–0	(Soviet Union) Torpedo Moscow	Hardturm, Zürich
	Egli 33'; Wiederkehr 35'; Gren 79'	Report		Attendance: 12,000; Referee: Kenny Hope (Scotland)

Grasshopper Club won 4–1 on aggregate.

===== Quarter-finals =====
7 March 1990 First leg	Sampdoria (Italy)	2–0	(Switzerland) Grasshopper	Stadio Luigi Ferraris, Genoa
	Vierchowod 13'; Meier 84' (o.g.)	Report		Attendance: 31,323; Referee: Peter Mikkelsen (Denmark)

22 March 1990 Second leg	Grasshopper (Switzerland)	1–2	(Italy) Sampdoria	Hardturm, Zürich
	Wyss 67'	Report	Toninho Cerezo 43'; Lombardo 81'	Attendance: 28,700; Referee: Zoran Petrović (Yugoslavia)

Sampdoria won 4–1 on aggregate.

==== Intertoto Cup ====
===== Group 4 =====
Pos	Team	Pld	W	D	L	GF	GA	GD	Pts	GCZ	GYŐ	ADM	BRØ
1	(Switzerland) Grasshopper Club	6	3	1	2	14	12	+2	7	—	2–1	4–3	3–4
2	(Hungary) Rába ETO Győr	6	3	1	2	10	8	+2	7	1–0	—	5–0	1–0
3	(Austria) Admira Wacker Wien	6	2	1	3	15	17	−2	5	2–2	5–1	—	5–0
4	(Denmark) Brøndby	6	2	1	3	11	13	−2	5	1–3	1–1	5–1	—

Source: Pawel Mogielnicki's Page
Rules for classification: 1) Points; 2) Goal difference; 3) Goals scored; 4) Head-to-head points; 5) Away goals scored; 6) Draw.

=== Sion ===
==== UEFA Cup ====
===== First round =====
12 September 1989 First leg	Iraklis (Greece)	1–0	(Switzerland) Sion	Kaftanzoglio Stadium, Thessaloniki
	Toutziaris 28'	Report		Attendance: 14,041; Referee: Jozef Marko (Czechoslovakia)

26 September 1989 Second leg	Sion (Switzerland)	2–0	(Greece) Iraklis	Stade de Tourbillon, Sion
	Baljić 75'; López 79'	Report		Attendance: 14,630; Referee: José María Enríquez Negreira (Spain)

Sion won 2–1 on aggregate.

===== Second round =====
17 October 1989 First leg	Sion (Switzerland)	2–1	(East Germany) Karl-Marx-Stadt	Stade de Tourbillon, Sion
	Brigger 49'; Piffaretti 66'	Report	Laudeley 25'	Attendance: 10,354; Referee: Rosario Lo Bello (Italy)

31 October 1989 Second leg	Karl-Marx-Stadt (East Germany)	4–1	(Switzerland) Sion	Ernst-Thälmann-Stadion, Karl-Marx-Stadt
	Ziffert 11'; Steinmann 29' (pen.); Wienhold 41'; Laudeley 64'	Report	Cina 79'	Attendance: 20,800; Referee: Alan Snoddy (Northern Ireland)

Karl-Marx-Stadt won 5–3 on aggregate.

=== Wettingen ===
==== UEFA Cup ====
===== First round =====
12 September 1989 First leg	Wettingen (Switzerland)	3–0	(Republic of Ireland) Dundalk	Stadion Altenburg, Wettingen
	Cleary 42' (o.g.); Corneliusson 66'; Löbmann 69'	Report		Attendance: 3,700; Referee: Dušan Krchňák (Czechoslovakia)

26 September 1989 Second leg	Dundalk (Republic of Ireland)	0–2	(Switzerland) Wettingen	Oriel Park, Dundalk
		Report	Löbmann 42', 53'	Attendance: 1,361; Referee: Douglas Hope (Scotland)

Wettingen won 5–0 on aggregate.

===== Second round =====
17 October 1989 First leg	Wettingen (Switzerland)	0–0	(Italy) Napoli	Letzigrund, Zürich
		Report		Attendance: 13,000; Referee: Ion Crăciunescu (Romania)

31 October 1989 First leg	Napoli (Italy)	2–1	(Switzerland) Wettingen	Stadio San Paolo, Naples
	Baroni 47'; Mauro 74' (pen.)	Report	Bertelsen 14'	Attendance: 47,334; Referee: Edgar Azzopardi (Malta)

Napoli won 2–1 on aggregate.

==== Intertoto Cup ====
===== Group 7 =====
Pos	Team	Pld	W	D	L	GF	GA	GD	Pts	ÖRE	SLP	WET	SIÓ
1	(Sweden) Örebro	6	5	0	1	16	5	+11	10	—	2–0	4–1	1–2
2	(Czechoslovakia) Slavia Prague	6	3	0	3	11	10	+1	6	0–4	—	4–0	4–1
3	(Switzerland) Wettingen	6	2	0	4	9	13	−4	4	1–2	1–2	—	3–1
4	(Hungary) Siófoki Bányász	6	2	0	4	7	15	−8	4	1–3	2–1	0–3	—

Source: Pawel Mogielnicki's Page
Rules for classification: 1) Points; 2) Goal difference; 3) Goals scored; 4) Head-to-head points; 5) Away goals scored; 6) Draw.

=== Bellinzona ===
==== Intertoto Cup ====
===== Group 3 =====
Pos	Team	Pld	W	D	L	GF	GA	GD	Pts	TIN	VÁC	EVT	BEL
1	(Austria) Tirol Innsbruck	6	4	1	1	15	5	+10	9	—	1–0	4–0	4–0
2	(Hungary) Váci Izzó	6	2	3	1	3	2	+1	7	0–0	—	1–0	1–0
3	(Bulgaria) Etar Veliko Tarnovo	6	1	3	2	3	7	−4	5	2–1	0–0	—	0–0
4	(Switzerland) Bellinzona	6	0	3	3	5	12	−7	3	3–5	1–1	1–1	—

Source: Pawel Mogielnicki's Page
Rules for classification: 1) Points; 2) Goal difference; 3) Goals scored; 4) Head-to-head points; 5) Away goals scored; 6) Draw.

== Sources ==
- Switzerland 1989–90 at RSSSF
- Cup finals at Fussball-Schweiz
- Intertoto history at Pawel Mogielnicki's Page
- Josef Zindel (2018). FC Basel 1893. Die ersten 125 Jahre (in German). Basel: Friedrich Reinhardt Verlag. ISBN 978-3-7245-2305-5.

Preceded by 1988–89	Seasons in Swiss football	Succeeded by 1990–91
