= Lambert Darchis =

17th-century arts patron from Liège

Lambert Darchis (baptised 31 July 1625; died 25 February 1699) was an arts patron from Liège. He is also thought to have been an ecclesiastic, but according to some sources his ordination has never been confirmed.

== Life ==
Son of Jacques Darchis and Marguerite Froidmont, he was baptized in the Church of Notre-Dame aux Fonts in Liège on July 31, 1625. From 1646 to 1699, he worked in Rome in the service of the Roman Curia, before dying there on February 25, 1699.

Son of Jacques Darchis and Marguerite Froidmont, he was baptised in the church of Notre-Dame aux Fonts in Liège. From 1646 to his death he worked in Rome for the Roman Curia. His will was proven on 22 October 1696 and funded the creation of the 'fondation Lambert-Darchis', which granted travel bursaries to young artists, art restorers, art historians, engravers, composers and would-be ecclesiologists who had been born or were living in Liège or the surrounding diocese. The foundation still exists.

== Recipients of the Fondation ==
=== 18th century ===
- Jean-Noël Hamal (1709–1778), composer
- Laurent-Benoît Dewez (1731–1812), architect
- Léonard Defrance (1735–1805), painter
- Joseph Dreppe (1737–1810), engraver
- André Modeste Grétry (1741–1813), composer
- Henri Hamal (1744–1820), composer

=== 19th century ===
- Gilles-François Closson (1796–1842), painter
- Louis-Eugène Simonis (1810–1882), sculptor
- Jean-Mathieu Nisen (1819–1885), painter
- Victor Fassin (1826–1906), painter
- Adolphe Fassin (1828–1900), sculptor
- Jules Halkin (1830–1888), sculptor
- Léon Philippet (1843–1906), painter
- Alphonse de Tombay (1843–1918), sculptor
- Léon Mignon (1847–1898), sculptor
- Adrien de Witte (1850–1935), painter and engraver
- Joseph Pollard (1853–1922), sculptor

=== 20th century ===
- François Maréchal (1861–1945), engraver
- Richard Heintz (1871–1929), painter
- Dieudonné Jacobs (1887–1967), painter
- Jean-Pierre Ransonnet (born 1944), painter
- Pierre Petry (1945–2017), sculptor
- Claude Rahir (1937–2007), painter, sculptor, mosaicist

== Bibliography (in French) ==
- A. Micha, « La fondation Darchis », Bulletin de l'institut archéologique liégeois, Liège, t. XL, 1910, p. 99-115 (ISSN 0776-1260)
- Jean Puraye, La Fondation Lambert-Darchis à Rome, Liège, Fondation Lambert Darchis, 1993, 424 p.
- Jean Puraye, « Pierre-Joseph Antoine, boursier Darchis. », Bulletin de la société royale Le Vieux-Liège, t. XII, no 262, 1993, p. 441-451 (ISSN 0776-1309)
