= Peter Közle =

German footballer

Personal information
- Date of birth: 18 November 1967 (age 58)
- Place of birth: Trostberg, West Germany
- Height: 1.80 m (5 ft 11 in)
- Positions: Midfielder; forward

Youth career
- 1974–1984: TSV Trostberg
- 1984–: TSV 1860 Rosenheim
- FC Bayern Munich
- TSV Ampfing

Senior career*
Years	Team	Apps	(Gls)
–1987	TSV Ampfing		
1987	Cercle Brugge K.S.V.	2	(0)
1988–1990	BSC Young Boys	69	(27)
1990–1993	Grasshopper Club Zürich	56	(21)
1993–1995	MSV Duisburg	51	(17)
1995–1998	VfL Bochum	73	(17)
1998–2000	1. FC Union Berlin	27	(7)
2000–2001	MSV Duisburg	5	(1)
2002–2003	Old Xaverians	7	(8)
- * Club domestic league appearances and goals

Peter Közle (born 18 November 1967 in Trostberg) is a retired German football player.

== Club career ==
=== Club statistics ===
Club performance			League		Cup		League Cup		Continental		Total	
Season	Club	League	Apps	Goals	Apps	Goals	Apps	Goals	Apps	Goals	Apps	Goals
West Germany			League		DFB-Pokal		DFB-Ligapokal		Europe		Total	
1986–87	TSV Ampfing	Bayernliga			—		—		—			
Belgium			League		Cup		League Cup		Europe		Total	
1987–88	Cercle Brugge K.S.V.	First Division	2	0			—		—			
Switzerland			League		Cup		League Cup		Europe		Total	
1987–88	BSC Young Boys	Nationalliga A	7	0			—					
1988–89	BSC Young Boys	Nationalliga A	32	17			—		—			
1989–90	BSC Young Boys	Nationalliga A	30	10			—		—			
1990–91	Grasshopper Club Zürich	Nationalliga A	28	7			—		2	2		
1991–92	Grasshopper Club Zürich	Nationalliga A	18	12			—		2	0		
1993–94	Grasshopper Club Zürich	Nationalliga A	10	2			—					
Germany			League		DFB-Pokal		DFB-Ligapokal		Europe		Total	
1993–94	MSV Duisburg	Bundesliga	30	13	4	1	—		—		34	14
1994–95	MSV Duisburg	Bundesliga	21	4	2	1	—		—		23	5
1995–96	VfL Bochum	2. Bundesliga	33	11	1	0	—		—		34	11
1996–97	VfL Bochum	Bundesliga	28	6	4	2	—		—		32	8
1997–98	VfL Bochum	Bundesliga	12	0	1	0	1	0	3	0	17	0
1998–99	1. FC Union Berlin	Regionalliga Nordost	27	7	—		—		—		27	7
1999–00	1. FC Union Berlin	Regionalliga Nordost	0	0	—		—		—		0	0
2000–01	MSV Duisburg	2. Bundesliga	5	1	1	1	—		—		6	2
Total	West Germany				0	0	0	0	0	0		
Total	Belgium		2	0			0	0	0	0		
Total	Switzerland		125	48			0	0				
Total	Germany		156	42	13	5	1	0	3	0	173	47
Career total							1	0				
