= Hamal (surname) =

Hamal is a surname. Notable people with that surname include:

== Hamal family of musicians ==
- Henri-Guillaume Hamal (1685–1752), musician and composer who lived and worked in Liège
- Henri Hamal (1744–1820), composer
- Jean-Noël Hamal (1709-1778), composer

== Other ==
- Rajesh Hamal (born 1966), Nepalese actor
