= Hamal (disambiguation) =

Hamal is the brightest star in Aries.

Hamal may also refer to:

- Hamal (surname), including a list of people with the name
- Hamal Castle, Rutten, Belgium
- Hamal Lake, Sindh, Pakistan
- Hamal, a name used in Afghanistan for Farvardin, the first month in the Solar Hijri calendar

== See also ==
- Khamal (disambiguation)
- Kamal (disambiguation)
- Hambal, also known as Hammal, a village in Iran
- Hamal 18, a 2004 American film
- Hamallayya or Hamallism, a religious order
- Hamall Þormóðsson, an 11th-century allsherjargoði of Iceland
