= 1988–89 in Swiss football =

Football in Switzerland
- Season: 1988–89

Men's football
- Nationalliga A: Luzern
- Nationalliga B: No team was declared champions
- 1. Liga: Overall champions FC Zug; Group 1: FC Châtel-Saint-Denis; Group 2: FC Laufen; Group 3: SC Kriens; Group 4: FC Altstätten
- Swiss Cup: Grasshopper Club

Women's football
- Swiss Women's Super League: FC Rapid Lugano
- Swiss Cup: SV Seebach Zürich

The following is a summary of the 1988–89 season of competitive football in Switzerland.

== Nationalliga A ==
=== Qualification phase ===
Pos	Team	Pld	W	D	L	GF	GA	GD	Pts	Qualification
1	Luzern	22	10	8	4	27	25	+2	28	Advance to championship round halved points (rounded up) as bonus
2	Grasshopper Club	22	10	7	5	41	29	+12	27	Advance to championship round halved points (rounded up) as bonus
3	Bellinzona	22	9	7	6	34	27	+7	25	Advance to championship round halved points (rounded up) as bonus
4	Sion	22	8	8	6	25	21	+4	24	Advance to championship round halved points (rounded up) as bonus
5	Wettingen	22	5	14	3	23	21	+2	24	Advance to championship round halved points (rounded up) as bonus
6	Young Boys	22	8	7	7	45	36	+9	23	Advance to championship round halved points (rounded up) as bonus
7	Xamax	22	7	9	6	39	33	+6	23	Advance to championship round halved points (rounded up) as bonus
8	Servette	22	8	6	8	39	34	+5	22	Advance to championship round halved points (rounded up) as bonus
9	Aarau	22	5	8	9	27	29	−2	18	Continue to promotion/relegation round
10	Lausanne-Sport	22	5	8	9	27	34	−7	18	Continue to promotion/relegation round
11	St. Gallen	22	5	6	11	29	44	−15	16	Continue to promotion/relegation round
12	Lugano	22	3	10	9	23	46	−23	16	Continue to promotion/relegation round

Source: rsssf.com
Rules for classification: 1) Points; 2) Goal difference; 3) Goals scored; 4) Head-to-head points; 5) Away goals scored; 6) Draw.

=== Championship group ===
The first eight teams of the qualification phase competed in the Championship round. The teams took half of the points (rounded up to complete units) gained in the qualification as bonus with them.

Pos	Team	Pld	W	D	L	GF	GA	GD	BP	Pts	Qualification
1	Luzern	14	7	5	2	17	11	+6	14	33	Swiss champions, qualified for 1989–90 European Cup and entered 1989 Intertoto Cup
2	Grasshopper Club	14	7	2	5	20	18	+2	14	30	Swiss Cup winners, qualified for 1989–90 Cup Winners' Cup and entered 1989 Intertoto Cup
3	Sion	14	6	5	3	22	15	+7	12	29	Qualified for 1989–90 UEFA Cup
4	Wettingen	14	7	2	5	22	14	+8	12	28	Qualified for 1989–90 UEFA Cup and entered 1989 Intertoto Cup
5	Young Boys	14	6	3	5	36	22	+14	12	27	
6	Xamax	14	4	3	7	23	26	−3	12	23	
7	Bellinzona	14	2	4	8	9	26	−17	13	21	Entered 1989 Intertoto Cup
8	Servette	14	3	4	7	25	42	−17	11	21	

Source: rsssf.com
Rules for classification: 1) points; 2) Position in the qualification.

== Nationalliga B ==
=== Qualification phase ===
Group East

Pos	Team	Pld	W	D	L	GF	GA	GD	Pts	Qualification
1	Basel	22	14	4	4	48	23	+25	32	Advance to promotion round
2	Locarno	22	12	6	4	58	28	+30	30	Advance to promotion round
3	Zürich	22	11	8	3	62	32	+30	30	Advance to promotion round
4	Baden	22	10	4	8	44	29	+15	24	Advance to promotion round
5	Old Boys	22	10	4	8	37	29	+8	24	Advance to promotion round
6	Chiasso	22	8	8	6	35	33	+2	24	Advance to promotion round
7	FC Schaffhausen	22	9	6	7	32	36	−4	24	Continue in relegation round
8	Winterthur	22	8	6	8	39	36	+3	22	Continue in relegation round
9	Emmenbrücke	22	7	5	10	31	41	−10	19	Continue in relegation round
10	Chur	22	4	8	10	27	54	−27	16	Continue in relegation round
11	SC Zug	22	3	5	14	14	47	−33	11	Continue in relegation round
12	FC Glarus	22	2	4	16	19	58	−39	8	Continue in relegation round

Source: rsssf.com
Rules for classification: 1) Points; 2) Goal difference; 3) Goals scored; 4) Head-to-head points; 5) Away goals scored; 6) Draw.

Group East

Pos	Team	Pld	W	D	L	GF	GA	GD	Pts	Qualification
1	Yverdon-Sport FC	22	13	7	2	51	25	+26	33	Advance to promotion round
2	FC Grenchen	22	14	2	6	51	23	+28	30	Advance to promotion round
3	Etoile Carouge FC	22	12	4	6	45	32	+13	28	Advance to promotion round
4	ES FC Malley	22	11	5	6	39	29	+10	27	Advance to promotion round
5	FC Bulle	22	11	4	7	49	25	+24	26	Advance to promotion round
6	CS Chênois	22	11	3	8	29	28	+1	25	Advance to promotion round
7	Urania Genève Sport	22	7	7	8	39	34	+5	21	Continue in relegation round
8	FC Renens	22	7	5	10	28	36	−8	19	Continue in relegation round
9	FC La Chaux-de-Fonds	22	6	6	10	26	37	−11	18	Continue in relegation round
10	FC Martigny-Sports	22	5	6	11	29	48	−19	16	Continue in relegation round
11	FC Montreux-Sports	22	3	5	14	31	61	−30	11	Continue in relegation round
12	FC Biel-Bienne	22	3	4	15	30	69	−39	10	Continue in relegation round

Source: rsssf.com
Rules for classification: 1) Points; 2) Goal difference; 3) Goals scored; 4) Head-to-head points; 5) Away goals scored; 6) Draw.

=== Promotion/relegation round ===
Group A

Pos	Team	Pld	W	D	L	GF	GA	GD	Pts	Qualification
1	FC St. Gallen	14	10	3	1	30	13	+17	23	Remain in Nationalliga A 1989–90
2	Lausanne Sports	14	9	4	1	42	8	+34	22	Remain in Nationalliga A 1989–90
3	FC Zürich	14	6	2	6	29	23	+6	14	Remain in Nationalliga B
4	FC Basel	14	4	6	4	19	21	−2	14	Remain in Nationalliga B
5	CS Chênois	14	4	4	6	22	29	−7	12	Remain in Nationalliga B
6	FC Grenchen	14	3	4	7	17	26	−9	10	Remain in Nationalliga B
7	ES Malley	14	2	6	6	15	29	−14	10	Remain in Nationalliga B
8	BSC Old Boys Basel	14	3	1	10	13	38	−25	7	Remain in Nationalliga B

Source: rsssf.com
Rules for classification: 1) Points; 2) Goal difference; 3) Goals scored; 4) Head-to-head points; 5) Away goals scored; 6) Draw.

Group B

Pos	Team	Pld	W	D	L	GF	GA	GD	Pts	Qualification
1	AC Lugano	14	10	3	1	29	10	+19	23	Remain in Nationalliga A 1989–90
2	FC Aarau	14	11	1	2	24	9	+15	23	Remain in Nationalliga A 1989–90
3	FC Locarno	14	6	3	5	22	16	+6	15	Remain in Nationalliga B
4	FC Baden	14	6	3	5	22	24	−2	15	Remain in Nationalliga B
5	Yverdon-Sport FC	14	4	6	4	9	9	0	14	Remain in Nationalliga B
6	FC Bulle	14	3	3	8	19	28	−9	9	Remain in Nationalliga B
7	FC Chiasso	14	0	7	7	15	30	−15	7	Remain in Nationalliga B
8	Étoile Carouge FC	14	1	4	9	8	22	−14	6	Remain in Nationalliga B

Source: rsssf.com
Rules for classification: 1) Points; 2) Goal difference; 3) Goals scored; 4) Head-to-head points; 5) Away goals scored; 6) Draw.

=== Relegation round NLB/1. Liga ===
The last six teams in each of the two qualification phase groups competed in two relegation groups against relegation to the 1. Liga 1991–92. There was to be one direct relegation in each group, plus a play-out against relegation between both second last placed teams.

Group A

Pos	Team	Pld	W	D	L	GF	GA	GD	Pts	Qualification
1	FC Schaffhausen	10	5	3	2	17	13	+4	13	Remain in NLB 1989–90
2	SC Zug	10	3	5	2	20	13	+7	11	Remain in NLB 1989–90
3	FC Martigny-Sports	10	4	3	3	18	23	−5	11	Remain in NLB 1989–90
4	FC Emmenbrücke	10	4	2	4	23	18	+5	10	Remain in NLB 1989–90
5	FC Biel-Bienne	10	3	2	5	16	18	−2	8	Play-out against relegation
6	FC Renens	10	2	3	5	12	21	−9	7	Relegated to 1989–90 1. Liga

Source: rsssf.com
Rules for classification: 1) Points; 2) Goal difference; 3) Goals scored; 4) Head-to-head points; 5) Away goals scored; 6) Draw.

Group B

Pos	Team	Pld	W	D	L	GF	GA	GD	Pts	Qualification
1	FC Glarus	10	7	1	2	16	9	+7	15	Remain in NLB 1989–90
2	FC Winterthur	10	5	2	3	19	11	+8	12	Remain in NLB 1989–90
3	FC Montreux-Sports	10	5	1	4	14	15	−1	11	Remain in NLB 1989–90
4	FC La Chaux-de-Fonds	10	3	3	4	11	13	−2	9	Remain in NLB 1989–90
5	FC Chur	10	1	5	4	13	16	−3	7	Play-out against relegation
6	Urania Genève Sport	10	2	2	6	9	18	−9	6	Relegated to 1989–90 1. Liga

Source: rsssf.com
Rules for classification: 1) Points; 2) Goal difference; 3) Goals scored; 4) Head-to-head points; 5) Away goals scored; 6) Draw.

=== Relegation play-out ===
Team 1	Score	Team 2
FC Biel-Bienne	0–1	FC Chur
FC Chur	2–1	FC Biel-Bienne

FC Chur won 3–1 on aggregate and FC Biel-Bienne were relegated to 1989–90 1. Liga.

== 1. Liga ==
=== Group 1 ===
Pos	Team	Pld	W	D	L	GF	GA	GD	Pts	Qualification or relegation
1	FC Châtel-Saint-Denis	26	17	5	4	53	20	+33	39	Play-off to Nationalliga B
2	FC Fribourg	26	12	10	4	44	26	+18	34	Play-off to Nationalliga B
3	FC Echallens	26	12	6	8	48	48	0	30	
4	FC Raron	26	12	5	9	47	37	+10	29	
5	FC Fully	26	11	5	10	39	35	+4	27	
6	FC Aigle	26	11	5	10	43	41	+2	27	
7	Vevey Sports	26	9	8	9	37	36	+1	26	
8	FC Monthey	26	9	7	10	35	31	+4	25	
9	FC Beauregard Fribourg	26	8	8	10	49	52	−3	24	
10	FC Stade Nyonnais	26	9	6	11	37	51	−14	24	
11	Concordia/Folgore Lausanne	26	7	8	11	27	36	−9	22	
12	FC Stade Lausanne	26	5	11	10	33	43	−10	21	Play-out against relegation
13	Grand-Lancy FC	26	6	8	12	37	47	−10	20	Relegation to 2. Liga Interregional
14	Central Fribourg	26	5	6	15	29	55	−26	16	Relegation to 2. Liga Interregional

Source: RSSSF
Rules for classification: 1) Points; 2) Goal difference within the league, but decider play-off for qualifiers.

=== Group 2 ===
Pos	Team	Pld	W	D	L	GF	GA	GD	Pts	Qualification or relegation
1	FC Laufen	26	16	9	1	62	21	+41	41	Play-off to Nationalliga B
2	FC Thun	26	16	5	5	72	36	+36	37	Play-off to Nationalliga B
3	SC Burgdorf	26	14	6	6	55	39	+16	34	
4	SV Lyss	26	12	8	6	34	28	+6	32	
5	FC Münsingen	26	13	4	9	55	38	+17	30	
6	FC Moutier	26	11	7	8	45	26	+19	29	
7	FC Colombier	26	11	6	9	38	35	+3	28	
8	FC Bern	26	9	8	9	41	41	0	26	
9	FC Breitenbach	26	8	10	8	41	41	0	26	
10	SR Delémont	26	8	5	13	41	48	−7	21	
11	FC Le Locle	26	7	7	12	34	48	−14	21	
12	FC Boudry	26	5	5	16	16	49	−33	15	Play-out against relegation
13	FC Rapid Ostermundigen	26	5	4	17	40	75	−35	14	Relegation to 2. Liga Interregional
14	FC Köniz	26	4	2	20	25	74	−49	10	Relegation to 2. Liga Interregional

Source: RSSSF
Rules for classification: 1) Points; 2) Goal difference within the league, but decider play-off for qualifiers.

=== Group 3 ===
Pos	Team	Pld	W	D	L	GF	GA	GD	Pts	Qualification or relegation
1	SC Kriens	26	14	8	4	48	27	+21	36	Play-off to Nationalliga B
2	FC Zug	26	11	11	4	31	18	+13	33	Play-off to Nationalliga B
3	FC Ascona	26	11	10	5	37	22	+15	32	
4	FC Solothurn	26	12	6	8	43	32	+11	30	
5	SC Buochs	26	10	8	8	37	30	+7	28	
6	FC Mendrisio	26	11	6	9	37	38	−1	28	
7	FC Pratteln	26	9	10	7	29	31	−2	28	
8	FC Tresa/Monteggio	26	10	7	9	34	37	−3	27	
9	FC Muri	26	6	13	7	34	32	+2	25	
10	FC Klus-Balsthal	26	9	7	10	30	28	+2	25	
11	FC Suhr	26	5	13	8	31	35	−4	23	
12	FC Wohlen	26	6	7	13	25	40	−15	19	Play-out against relegation
13	FC Olten	26	3	11	12	17	35	−18	17	Relegation to 2. Liga Interregional
14	FC Altdorf (Uri)	26	2	9	15	23	51	−28	13	Relegation to 2. Liga Interregional

Source: RSSSF
Rules for classification: 1) Points; 2) Goal difference within the league, but decider play-off for qualifiers.

=== Group 4 ===
Pos	Team	Pld	W	D	L	GF	GA	GD	Pts	Qualification or relegation
1	FC Altstätten (St. Gallen)	26	14	6	6	56	39	+17	34	Play-off to Nationalliga B
2	FC Brüttisellen	26	12	8	6	50	26	+24	32	Play-off to Nationalliga B
3	FC Herisau	26	11	8	7	43	37	+6	30	
4	FC Tuggen	26	11	7	8	42	30	+12	29	
5	FC Red Star Zürich	26	10	9	7	48	38	+10	29	
6	SC Veltheim	26	11	7	8	45	42	+3	29	
7	FC Landquart	26	10	8	8	34	40	−6	28	
8	FC Rorschach	26	8	9	9	35	34	+1	25	
9	FC Kilchberg	26	7	10	9	37	37	0	24	
10	SC Brühl	26	7	9	10	37	50	−13	23	
11	FC Vaduz	26	7	7	12	30	37	−7	21	
12	FC Einsiedeln	26	4	13	9	32	41	−9	21	Play-out against relegation
13	FC Stäfa	26	7	7	12	38	55	−17	21	Relegation to 2. Liga Interregional
14	FC Frauenfeld	26	7	4	15	29	50	−21	18	Relegation to 2. Liga Interregional

Source: RSSSF
Rules for classification: 1) Points; 2) Goal difference within the league, but decider play-off for qualifiers.

=== Promotion play-off ===
Qualification round

Team 1	Score	Team 2
Altstätten	1–1	FC Thun
FC Thun	2–0	Altstätten

FC Thun win 3–1 on aggregate and continue to the finals.

Team 1	Score	Team 2
SC Kriens	2–3	FC Fribourg
FC Fribourg	2–1	SC Kriens

FC Fribourg win 5–3 on aggregate and continue to the finals.

Team 1	Score	Team 2
FC Zug	3–1	Châtel-Saint-Denis
Châtel-Saint-Denis	3–3	FC Zug

FC Zug win 6–4 on aggregate and continue to the finals.

Team 1	Score	Team 2
FC Laufen	0–0	Brüttisellen
Brüttisellen	1–0	FC Laufen

Brüttisellen win 1–0 on aggregate and continue to the finals.

Final round

Team 1	Score	Team 2
Brüttisellen	2–1	FC Fribourg
FC Fribourg	2–0	Brüttisellen

FC Fribourg win 3–2 on aggregate and are promoted to 1989–90 Nationalliga B.

Team 1	Score	Team 2
FC Thun	1–2	FC Zug
FC Zug	2–0	FC Thun

FC Zug win 4–1 on aggregate and are promoted to 1989–90 Nationalliga B.

Decider for third place

The play-off for the third promotion place was played on 24 June 1989 in Burgdorf.

Team 1	Score	Team 2
Brüttisellen	2–2 a.e.t. 3–2 pen.	FC Thun

FC Brüttisellen win after penalty shoot-out and are promoted to 1989–90 Nationalliga B

Decider for championship

The play-off for the championship was played on 24 June 1989.

Team 1	Score	Team 2
FC Zug	5–1	FC Fribourg

FC Zug win and are declared 1.Liga champions.

=== Relegation play-out ===
First round

The first play-out against relegation was played on 4 June in Kilchberg.

Team 1	Score	Team 2
FC Wohlen	3–0	Einsiedeln

FC Wohlen win and Einsiedeln continue to the final.

The second play-out against relegation was played on 4 June in Echallens.

Team 1	Score	Team 2
FC Stade Lausanne	1–2	FC Boudry

FC Boudry win and FC Stade Lausanne continue to the final.

Final round

The play-out against relegation was played on 11 and 18 June 1989.

Team 1	Score	Team 2
FC Stade Lausanne	1–2	Einsiedeln
Einsiedeln	2–2	FC Stade Lausanne

Einsiedeln win 4–3 on aggregate. FC Stade Lausanne are relegated to 2. Liga.

== Swiss Cup ==
=== Early rounds ===
The routes of the finalists to the final, played on 15 May 1989 at the Wankdorf in Bern:

Round 3

Team 1	Score	Team 2
3 September 1988
FC Red Star Zürich	0–6	Grasshoppers
BSC Old Boys	1–2 (a.e.t.)	FC Aarau

Round 4

Team 1	Score	Team 2
13 November 1988
Grasshoppers	2–1	FC St. Gallen
Yverdon-Sport FC	2–4 (a.e.t.)	FC Aarau

Round 5

Team 1	Score	Team 2
11 March 1989
FC Aarau	1–1 (a.e.t.) (p. 4–3)	FC Grenchen
12 March 1989
FC Luzern	2–3	Grasshoppers

Quarter-finals

Team 1	Score	Team 2
12 April 1989
FC Basel	0–2	FC Aarau
FC Lausanne-Sport	1–2 (a.e.t.)	Grasshoppers

Semi-finals

Team 1	Score	Team 2
18 April 1989
FC Aarau	3–2	FC Lugano
FC Sion	0–0 (a.e.t.) (p. 3–4)	Grasshoppers

=== Final ===
15 May 1989
15:00

Grasshopper Club	2–1	FC Aarau
Andermatt (yellow card) 8'; Halter 8', 51' (yellow card) 75'; In-Albon (yellow card) 85'	Report	54' van der Gijp; (yellow card) 76' Kühni

Wankdorf, Bern
Attendance: 27,000
Referee: (Switzerland) Serge Muhmenthaler (Grenchen)

== Swiss Clubs in Europe ==
- Xamax as 1987–88 Nationalliga A champions: 1988–89 European Cup
- Grasshopper Club as 1987–88 Swiss Cup winners: 1988–89 Cup Winners' Cup and entered 1988 Intertoto Cup
- Servette as league second placed team: 1988–89 UEFA Cup
- Aarau as league third placed team: 1988–89 UEFA Cup and entered 1988 Intertoto Cup
- Luzern: entered 1988 Intertoto Cup
- Young Boys: entered 1988 Intertoto Cup

=== Xamax ===
==== European Cup ====
===== First round =====
7 September 1988 First leg	AEL (Greece)	2–1	(Switzerland) Neuchâtel Xamax	Alcazar Stadium, Larissa
16:00	Agorogiannis 5'; Mitsibonas 90'	Report	Hermann 59'	Attendance: 9,717; Referee: Karl-Josef Assenmacher (West Germany)

5 October 1988 Second leg	Neuchâtel Xamax (Switzerland)	2–1 (a.e.t.) (3–0 p)	(Greece) AEL	Stade de la Maladière, Neuchâtel
20:00	Lei-Ravello 61' (pen.); Lüthi 71'	Report	Karapialis 59'	Attendance: 12,200; Referee: Rosario Lo Bello (Italy)
	Penalties
	Hermann (penalty scored); Lei-Ravello (penalty scored); Decastel (penalty scored)		(penalty missed) Mitsibonas; (penalty missed) Bannon; (penalty missed) Tsiolis

3–3 on aggregate; Neuchâtel Xamax won on penalties.

===== Second round =====
26 October 1988 First leg	Neuchâtel Xamax (Switzerland)	3–0	(Turkey) Galatasaray	Stade de la Maladière, Neuchâtel
	Lüthi 55'; Chassot 87'; Decastel 90'	Report		Attendance: 23,000; Referee: Henning Lund-Sørensen (Denmark)

9 November 1988 Second leg	Galatasaray (Turkey)	5–0	(Switzerland) Neuchâtel Xamax	Ali Sami Yen Stadium, Istanbul
12:30	Uğur 18', 76'; Tanju 55', 78', 84'	Report		Attendance: 35,149; Referee: Joël Quiniou (France)

Galatasaray won 5–3 on aggregate.

=== Grasshopper Club ===
==== Cup Winners' Cup ====
===== First round =====
6 September 1988 First leg	Grasshopper (Switzerland)	0–0	(West Germany) Eintracht Frankfurt	St. Jakob Stadium, Basel
		Report		Attendance: 13,600; Referee: George Smith (Scotland)

4 October 1988 Second leg	Eintracht Frankfurt (West Germany)	1–0	(Switzerland) Grasshopper	Waldstadion, Frankfurt
	Bakalorz 32'	Report		Attendance: 13,280; Referee: Dušan Krchňák (Czechoslovakia)

Eintracht Frankfurt won 1–0 on aggregate.

==== Intertoto Cup ====
===== Group 9 =====
Pos	Team	Pld	W	D	L	GF	GA	GD	Pts	GCZ	PÉC	PSZ	ÖST
1	(Switzerland) Grasshopper Club	6	4	2	0	8	2	+6	10	—	1–0	1–0	1–1
2	(Hungary) Pécsi Munkás Sport Club	6	2	1	3	6	6	0	5	0–1	—	3–1	2–0
3	(Poland) Pogoń Szczecin	6	1	3	2	3	4	−1	5	0–0	0–0	—	2–0
4	(Sweden) Östers IF	6	1	2	3	5	10	−5	4	1–4	3–1	0–0	—

Source: Pawel Mogielnicki's Page
Rules for classification: 1) Points; 2) Goal difference; 3) Goals scored; 4) Head-to-head points; 5) Away goals scored; 6) Draw.

=== Servette ===
==== UEFA Cup ====
===== First round =====
7 September 1988 First leg	Servette (Switzerland)	1–0	(Austria) Sturm Graz	Stade des Charmilles, Geneva
20:00	Grossenbacher 89'	UEFA report		Attendance: 9,800; Referee: Manfred Roßner (East Germany)

5 October 1988 Second leg	Sturm Graz (Austria)	0–0	(Switzerland) Servette	Bundesstadion Liebenau, Graz
19:30		UEFA report		Attendance: 7,000; Referee: Jean-François Crucke (Belgium)

Servette won 1–0 on aggregate.

===== Second round =====
26 October 1988 First leg	Groningen (Netherlands)	2–0	(Switzerland) Servette	Stadion Oosterpark, Groningen
20:00	Groeleken 11'; Meijer 83'	UEFA report		Attendance: 19,500; Referee: Alexey Spirin (Soviet Union)

9 November 1988 Second leg	Servette (Switzerland)	1–1	(Netherlands) Groningen	Stade des Charmilles, Geneva
20:15	Schällibaum 30'	UEFA report	Meijer 83'	Attendance: 12,000; Referee: Tullio Lanese (Italy)

Groningen won 3–1 on aggregate.

=== Aarau ===
==== UEFA Cup ====
===== First round =====
7 September 1988 First leg	Aarau (Switzerland)	0–3	(East Germany) Lokomotive Leipzig	Stadion Brügglifeld, Aarau
			Hobsch 67', 81'; Marschall 85'	Attendance: 6,500; Referee: Alain Delmer (France)

5 October 1988 First leg	Lokomotive Leipzig (East Germany)	4–0	(Switzerland) Aarau	Bruno-Plache-Stadion, Leipzig
	Zimmerling 21', 28' (pen.); Halata 59', 83'			Attendance: 5,200; Referee: Kaj Natri (Finland)

Lokomotive Leipzig won 7–0 on aggregate.

==== Intertoto Cup ====
===== Group 2 =====
Pos	Team	Pld	W	D	L	GF	GA	GD	Pts	GÖT	SIG	SLS	AAR
1	(Sweden) IFK Göteborg	6	3	2	1	10	7	+3	8	—	0–0	2–1	1–2
2	(Czechoslovakia) Sigma Olomouc	6	3	1	2	10	10	0	7	3–4	—	2–1	1–0
3	(Bulgaria) Slavia Sofia	6	2	1	3	8	9	−1	5	0–2	3–1	—	2–1
4	(Switzerland) FC Aarau	6	1	2	3	7	9	−2	4	1–1	2–3	1–1	—

Source: Pawel Mogielnicki's Page
Rules for classification: 1) Points; 2) Goal difference; 3) Goals scored; 4) Head-to-head points; 5) Away goals scored; 6) Draw.

=== Young Boys ===
==== Intertoto Cup ====
===== Group 5 =====
Pos	Team	Pld	W	D	L	GF	GA	GD	Pts	YBB	DAC	NOR	SZO
1	(Switzerland) Young Boys	6	4	0	2	16	9	+7	8	—	5–1	3–2	4–0
2	(Czechoslovakia) DAC Dunajská Streda	6	3	1	2	12	8	+4	7	3–1	—	5–1	3–0
3	(Sweden) IFK Norrköping	6	2	1	3	8	13	−5	5	0–2	1–0	—	2–2
4	(Hungary) Szombathelyi Haladás	6	1	2	3	6	12	−6	4	3–1	0–0	1–2	—

Source: Pawel Mogielnicki's Page
Rules for classification: 1) Points; 2) Goal difference; 3) Goals scored; 4) Head-to-head points; 5) Away goals scored; 6) Draw.

=== Luzern ===
==== Intertoto Cup ====
===== Group 6 =====
Pos	Team	Pld	W	D	L	GF	GA	GD	Pts	KAI	AWW	LUZ	ŁKS
1	(West Germany) 1. FC Kaiserslautern	6	4	1	1	15	8	+7	9	—	1–0	4–2	4–1
2	(Austria) Admira Wacker Wien	6	2	3	1	12	7	+5	7	1–1	—	2–0	2–2
3	(Switzerland) FC Luzern	6	3	1	2	11	10	+1	7	2–1	1–1	—	3–1
4	(Poland) ŁKS Łódź	6	0	1	5	9	22	−13	1	2–4	2–6	1–3	—

Source: Pawel Mogielnicki's Page
Rules for classification: 1) Points; 2) Goal difference; 3) Goals scored; 4) Head-to-head points; 5) Away goals scored; 6) Draw.

== Sources ==
- Switzerland 1988–89 at RSSSF
- Cup finals at Fussball-Schweiz
- Intertoto history at Pawel Mogielnicki's Page
- Josef Zindel (2018). FC Basel 1893. Die ersten 125 Jahre (in German). Basel: Friedrich Reinhardt Verlag. ISBN 978-3-7245-2305-5.

Preceded by 1987–88	Seasons in Swiss football	Succeeded by 1989–90
