= FC Petrolul Ploiești in European football =

- Club: Petrolul Ploiești
- First entry: 1958–59 European Cup
- Latest entry: 2014–15 UEFA Europa League

Fotbal Club Petrolul Ploiești, commonly known as Petrolul Ploiești, or simply as Petrolul, is a Romanian professional football club based in Ploiești, Prahova County. The club has participated in 8 editions of the club competitions governed by UEFA, the chief authority for football across Europe, and in 12 editions of European competitions overall thus far.

== Total statistics ==
As of 9 August 2015.

Competition	S	P	W	D	L	GF	GA	GD
UEFA Champions League / European Cup	3	8	2	1	5	8	15	–7
UEFA Cup Winners' Cup / European Cup Winners' Cup	2	6	2	2	2	4	7	–3
UEFA Europa League / UEFA Cup	3	14	7	2	5	25	20	+5
UEFA Intertoto Cup	1	6	1	1	4	6	14	–8
Inter-Cities Fairs Cup	3	13	9	0	4	14	11	+3
Total	12	47	21	6	20	57	67	–10

== Statistics by competition ==
Notes for the abbreviations in the tables below:

- PR: Preliminary round
- QR: Qualifying round
- 1R: First round
- 2R: Second round
- QF: Quarter-finals
- 2QR: Second qualifying round
- 3QR: Third qualifying round
- PO: Play-off round

=== UEFA Champions League / European Cup ===
Season	Round	Opponent	Home	Away	Aggregate
1958–59	PR	(East Germany) Wismut Karl Marx Stadt	2–0	2–4	4–4^{1}
1959–60	PR	(Austria) Wiener Sportclub	1–2	0–0	1–2
1966–67	1R	(England) Liverpool	3–1	0–2	3–3^{2}

^{1} Wismut Karl Marx Stadt progressed to the first round after winning a play-off match 4–0.
^{2} Liverpool progressed to the second round after winning a play-off match 2–0.

=== UEFA Cup Winners' Cup / European Cup Winners' Cup ===
Season	Round	Opponent	Home	Away	Aggregate
1963–64	PR	(Turkey) Fenerbahçe	1–0	1–4	2–4
1995–96	QR	(Wales) Wrexham	1–0	0–0	1–0
1995–96	1R	(Austria) Rapid Wien	0–0	1–3	1–3

=== Inter-Cities Fairs Cup ===
Season	Round	Opponent	Home	Away	Aggregate
1962–63	1R	(Czech Republic) Spartak Brno	4–0	1–0	5–0
1962–63	2R	(East Germany) Leipzig XI	1–0	0–1	1–1^{3}
1962–63	QF	(Hungary) Ferencváros	1–0	0–2	1–2
1964–65	1R	(Turkey) Göztepe A.Ş.	2–1	1–0	3–1
1964–65	2R	(Bulgaria) Lokomotiv Plovdiv	1–0	0–2	1–2
1967–68	1R	(Socialist Federal Republic of Yugoslavia) Dinamo Zagreb	2–0	0–5	2–5

^{3} Petrolul Ploiești progressed to the quarter-finals after winning a play-off match 1–0.

=== UEFA Europa League / UEFA Cup ===
Season	Round	Opponent	Home	Away	Aggregate
1990–91	1R	(Belgium) Anderlecht	0–2	0–2	0–4
2013–14	2QR	(Faroe Islands) Víkingur	3–0	4–0	7–0
2013–14	3QR	(Netherlands) Vitesse Arnhem	1–1	2–1	3–2
2013–14	PO	(England) Swansea City	2–1	1–5	3–6
2014–15	2QR	(Albania) Flamurtari	2–0	3–1	5–1
2014–15	3QR	(Czech Republic) Viktoria Plzeň	1–1	4–1	5–2
2014–15	PO	(Croatia) Dinamo Zagreb	1–3	1–2	2–5

=== UEFA Intertoto Cup ===
==== 1990 – Group 9 ====
Pos	Team	Pld	W	D	L	GF	GA	GD	Pts	CHE	STU	DÜS	PET
1	(East Germany) Chemnitz	6	3	2	1	4	2	+2	8	—	0–0	2–0	1–0
2	(Austria) Sturm Graz	6	2	3	1	9	3	+6	7	0–0	—	0–0	6–1
3	(West Germany) Fortuna Düsseldorf	6	2	2	2	6	6	0	6	2–0	1–0	—	1–1
4	(Romania) Petrolul Ploiești	6	1	1	4	6	14	−8	3	0–1	1–3	3–2	—

Source: Pawel Mogielnicki's Page 1990
Rules for classification: 1) Points; 2) Goal difference; 3) Goals scored; 4) Head-to-head points; 5) Away goals scored; 6) Draw.

Opponent	Home	Away
(East Germany) Chemnitz	0–1	0–1
(Austria) Sturm Graz	1–3	1–6
(Germany) Fortuna Düsseldorf	3–2	1–1
