= Henri-Guillaume Hamal =

Flemish composer (1685–1752)

- Born: Henri-Guillaume Hamal; 3 December 1685; Liège, Holy Roman Empire
- Died: 3 December 1752 (aged 67); Liège, Holy Roman Empire
- Education: Saint Lambert's Cathedral, Liège
- Occupation(s): musician, musical director and composer
- Spouse: Catherine Corbusier
- Children: 5 sons, incl. Jean-Noël, 1 daughter
- Relatives: Henri Hamal (grandson)

Henri-Guillaume Hamal (also Hamalle or Amael; 1685, (Note: Grove gives his date of birth as 3 December 1685. However, Villenfagne (1788), Henri Hamal (published 1835) and F.-J. Fétis (1866) say no more than 1685, and Eitner (1901) even says "um [i.e. circa] 1685". Villenfagne does not specify his date of death, but Hamal, Fétis and Eitner say it was 3 December 1752. The coincidence that Grove gives both date of birth and date of death as 3 December is a matter for concern, suggesting a possible scribal error, and advising caution.) Liège, nowadays in Belgium – 3 December 1752 (aged 67), Liège) was a Walloon (i.e. a French-speaking native of the Low Countries) musician, musical director and composer.

He is the first of the Hamal family of musicians, who were pre-eminent in 18th Century Liège, of whom we have knowledge. (Note: Villenfagne (1788) mentions only three musicians: Henri Dumont (1610-1684), Hamal, and his son Jean-Noël.) He spent his whole life in the Prince-Bishopric of Liège, an ecclesiastical principality of the Holy Roman Empire. The Prince-Bishop was a man of consequence: he was a member of the Imperial Diet. The principality was a strategically-important frontier state. When Hamal was born, it was part of the Spanish Netherlands. Between 1688 and 1704, it was much fought over between the French and the Dutch-British allies (themselves allies of the Empire, as part of the Grand Alliance). In 1714, at the end of the War of the Spanish Succession, it became part of the Austrian Netherlands; but the Dutch troops left only in 1718.

Hamal received his early musical education from Lambert Pietkin (1613-1696), maître de chapelle at Saint Lambert's Cathedral, Liège. He was known as an excellent singer, graceful, tasteful, and expressive. In 1708 or 1709, he married Catherine Corbusier. They had six children, five boys and a girl. His eldest child, Jean-Noël (1709-1778), and his grandson Henri (1744–1820), son of his youngest child, Dieudonné-Lambert, were also musicians in Liège. At around the same time, he was appointed maître de musique (a similar position to maître de chapelle, but of lower status) at the parish church of Onze-Lieve-Vrouwekerk (French: Église de Notre-Dame; English: Church of Our Lady) in Sint-Truiden (French: Saint-Trond), an important town in the principality. He later returned to Liège (Note: The timeline of this part of his life is unclear. Either, he was appointed maître de musique at Sint-Truiden at the age of 23 (which would mean 1708 or 1709) and returned to Liège the same year; or, he was appointed to that post after his marriage in 1708 and returned to Liège in 1711; or, he returned no later than 1711 or 1712; or, he spent the two years 1711 and 1712 in Sint-Truiden.) to take up a position as sous-maîtrise de chapelle in the cathedral organisation, eventually rising to maître de musique.

All sources say that he had a reputation for honesty and probity. He was received by good society in Liège. (Note: Grove says he was "not a society man"; but this contradicts baron de Villenfagne, a nobleman born in Liège the year after Hamal died, who in all probability knew people who had known him.) He composed principally motets, for both accompanied and unaccompanied voices, but also masses, cantatas (in French, Italian and Walloon dialect), a "Tantum ergo", a "Laudate pueri", and a "Te Deum". He had a talent for improvising comic songs in several languages while accompanying himself on the cello. None of his compositions was printed. Some of his manuscripts are recorded as having still been in existence in 1867 and 1901, but all now seem to have been lost. Édouard Fétis's impression was that Hamal was agreeable company but a mediocre musician. Maurice Barthélemy thought that Hamal's grandson Henri tended to overstate his grandfather's importance.
