= Khamal =

Khamal may refer to:

- Mohamed Khamal (born 1990), Moroccan-Dutch kickboxer
- Kamahl (born 1934), Australian singer

== See also ==
- Kamal (disambiguation)
- Hamal (disambiguation)
