= 1988–89 French Division 1 =

51st season of French Division 1

Division 1
- Season: 1988–89
- Champions: Marseille (5th title)
- Relegated: Strasbourg; Laval; Lens
- European Cup: Marseille
- Cup Winners' Cup: Monaco
- UEFA Cup: Paris Saint-Germain; Sochaux; Auxerre
- Matches: 380
- Goals: 900 (2.37 per match)
- Top goalscorer: Jean-Pierre Papin (22)

Olympique de Marseille won Division 1 season 1988/1989 of the French Association Football League with 73 points.

== Participating teams ==
- Auxerre
- Bordeaux
- SM Caen
- AS Cannes
- Stade Lavallois
- RC Lens
- Lille
- Olympique Marseille
- FC Metz
- AS Monaco
- Montpellier La Paillade SC
- FC Nantes Atlantique
- OGC Nice
- Matra Racing
- Paris Saint-Germain FC
- AS Saint-Etienne
- FC Sochaux-Montbéliard
- RC Strasbourg
- Sporting Toulon Var
- Toulouse FC
Location of teams in 1988–89 Division 1

== League table ==
Pos	Team	Pld	W	D	L	GF	GA	GD	Pts	Qualification or relegation
1	Marseille (C)	38	20	13	5	56	35	+21	73	Qualification to European Cup first round
2	Paris Saint-Germain	38	19	13	6	45	26	+19	70	Qualification to UEFA Cup first round
3	Monaco	38	18	14	6	62	38	+24	68	Qualification to Cup Winners' Cup first round (Note: Monaco qualified for 1989–90 European Cup Winners' Cup as runners-up of the 1988–89 Coupe de France as cup winners Marseille also won the league and qualified for the European Cup.)
4	Sochaux	38	19	11	8	50	28	+22	68	Qualification to UEFA Cup first round
5	Auxerre	38	18	9	11	41	32	+9	63	Qualification to UEFA Cup preliminary round
6	Nice	38	16	9	13	45	40	+5	57	
7	Nantes	38	15	12	11	41	40	+1	57	
8	Lille	38	15	11	12	50	38	+12	56	
9	Montpellier	38	14	10	14	51	53	−2	52	
10	Toulouse	38	12	15	11	44	46	−2	51	
11	Toulon	38	12	14	12	30	29	+1	50	
12	Cannes	38	14	8	16	45	47	−2	50	
13	Bordeaux	38	12	13	13	54	46	+8	49	
14	Saint-Étienne	38	12	12	14	39	50	−11	48	
15	Metz	38	12	11	15	47	49	−2	47	
16	Caen	38	10	10	18	39	60	−21	40	
17	Matra Racing	38	10	9	19	49	56	−7	39	
18	Strasbourg (R)	38	10	9	19	47	59	−12	39	Qualification to relegation play-offs
19	Laval (R)	38	8	11	19	33	55	−22	35	Relegation to French Division 2
20	Lens (R)	38	3	8	27	32	73	−41	17	Relegation to French Division 2

Source: Histoire du PSG
Rules for classification: 1) points; 2) goal difference; 3) number of goals scored.
Victory: 3 points, Draw: 1 point, Defeat: 0 points
(C) Champions; (R) Relegated
Notes:

Promoted from Division 2, who will play in Division 1 season 1989/1990

- Olympique Lyonnais: Champion of Division 2, winner of Division 2 group B
- FC Mulhouse: Runner-up, winner of Division 2 group A
- Stade Brest: Third place, winner of barrages against RC Strasbourg

== Results ==
Home \ Away	AUX	BOR	CAE	CAN	LAV	RCL	LIL	OM	MRC	MET	ASM	MHS	FCN	NIC	PSG	STE	SOC	RCS	SCT	TFC
Auxerre		1–1	3–0	0–0	2–1	1–0	1–0	1–0	1–1	2–1	0–0	1–0	1–0	1–0	0–0	2–0	2–1	2–1	3–0	0–0
Bordeaux	2–0		2–3	0–0	2–1	4–1	0–0	0–0	3–2	4–1	1–1	2–1	5–0	2–0	0–1	5–0	1–2	2–0	1–1	1–1
Caen	1–0	3–0		3–0	1–1	1–0	2–1	0–0	1–1	0–0	0–3	0–1	2–3	2–1	0–1	2–3	0–0	3–3	2–1	3–0
Cannes	3–0	1–1	2–0		3–2	3–0	1–0	3–1	2–1	1–1	3–2	0–1	1–2	2–0	0–3	1–0	2–0	4–1	1–0	5–1
Laval	0–1	1–0	1–1	2–0		2–1	1–2	0–1	4–2	3–0	0–0	0–1	0–2	1–2	1–2	1–1	1–1	1–0	0–0	2–0
Lens	0–1	0–2	5–0	2–2	0–2		1–2	0–1	1–1	0–2	1–1	0–0	0–0	2–0	0–0	1–3	2–2	1–3	0–1	1–1
Lille	1–0	0–1	1–1	1–0	8–0	1–0		2–1	3–0	1–1	2–4	3–1	0–1	2–0	2–1	2–2	2–0	1–1	0–0	0–0
Marseille	2–1	2–2	4–2	2–1	1–0	5–2	1–1		2–0	3–2	2–2	1–1	1–0	3–2	1–0	2–0	0–0	3–1	1–0	3–1
Matra Racing	1–2	4–1	3–1	1–0	2–2	3–0	1–0	0–2		1–4	3–0	4–0	2–0	1–1	0–2	3–1	0–2	2–1	1–1	0–1
Metz	2–1	3–0	1–0	2–1	0–0	4–0	3–1	1–3	1–1		0–3	1–2	0–0	1–0	0–1	1–2	1–0	1–1	1–2	1–1
Monaco	1–2	4–2	3–1	2–0	1–0	1–0	1–1	3–0	1–0	1–1		4–2	4–1	1–1	1–0	2–2	0–0	4–1	2–2	1–0
Montpellier	1–0	2–2	1–0	0–0	6–2	2–0	2–3	1–0	0–0	5–3	4–2		1–4	1–1	0–0	2–0	1–2	1–0	0–1	1–0
Nantes	3–2	1–0	3–1	1–1	1–1	3–1	1–0	1–1	1–0	1–0	1–1	2–1		0–1	1–1	1–1	0–0	2–2	0–0	1–2
Nice	1–0	1–0	5–0	2–1	1–0	3–0	0–1	2–2	3–2	1–1	1–1	3–3	1–0		3–1	1–0	3–2	1–0	1–0	2–0
Paris SG	2–2	1–1	3–0	1–0	3–0	3–2	1–1	0–0	2–1	2–2	0–2	3–2	1–0	1–0		3–1	1–0	1–0	0–0	2–1
Saint-Étienne	1–1	1–0	1–1	1–0	1–0	2–4	2–0	0–0	4–3	0–1	0–1	1–0	1–1	0–0	0–0		1–2	0–0	2–1	3–2
Sochaux	3–2	1–1	1–0	4–0	3–0	2–1	2–0	0–0	2–0	1–0	0–0	2–0	0–1	1–0	2–1	1–0		3–0	2–1	2–2
Strasbourg	1–0	3–2	1–2	0–0	3–0	4–1	1–3	2–3	1–1	1–2	1–2	3–1	2–0	3–0	0–0	0–1	0–3		2–1	4–1
Toulon	1–2	1–0	1–0	3–0	0–0	3–1	2–1	1–2	1–0	1–0	1–0	1–1	1–0	0–0	0–1	0–0	0–0	0–0		1–1
Toulouse	0–0	1–1	0–0	4–1	0–0	2–1	1–1	0–0	2–1	2–1	2–0	2–2	1–2	2–1	0–0	3–1	2–1	4–0	1–0	

Legend: Blue = home team win; Yellow = draw; Red = away team win.

== Relegation play-offs ==
Team 1	Agg.	Team 2	1st leg	2nd leg
Strasbourg	2–3	Brest	2–2	0–1

== Top goalscorers ==
Rank	Player	Club	Goals
1	(France) Jean-Pierre Papin	Marseille	22
2	(England) Glenn Hoddle	Monaco	18
2	(Socialist Federal Republic of Yugoslavia) Zlatko Vujović	Cannes	18
4	(France) Laurent Blanc	Montpellier	15
4	(France) Daniel Bravo	Nice	15
4	(France) Stéphane Paille	Sochaux	15
4	(France) Daniel Xuereb	Paris Saint-Germain	15
8	(France) Fabrice Divert	Caen	14
8	(Belgium) Erwin Vandenbergh	Lille	14
8	(Liberia) George Weah	Monaco	14

== Attendances ==
#	Club	Average
1	Marseille	26,530
2	Girondins	17,593
3	PSG	17,319
4	Saint-Étienne	13,325
5	Nantes	12,395
6	Toulouse	10,962
7	Caen	10,600
8	Strasbourg	9,883
9	Metz	9,392
10	AJA	8,774
11	Racing	8,549
12	LOSC	8,359
13	Nice	7,693
14	Lens	7,297
15	Toulon	7,161
16	Stade lavallois	7,093
17	MHSC	6,854
18	Sochaux	6,268
19	Monaco	4,992
20	Cannes	4,662
