= Václav Pěcháček =

Czech footballer

Personal information
- Date of birth: 26 March 1959 (age 67)
- Position: Defender

Senior career*
Years	Team	Apps	(Gls)
1978–1986	Baník Ostrava		
1987	VTJ Tábor		
1987	Dukla Prague		
1988–1990	Baník Ostrava		

International career
- Czechoslovakia U21
- * Club domestic league appearances and goals

Václav Pěcháček (born 26 March 1959) is a retired Czech football defender.
