= Henri Hamal =

Henri Hamal (July 20, 1744, Liège – September 17, 1820, Liège) was a composer. He spent the majority of his career as the director of music at the Saint Lambert's Cathedral, Liège. He should not be confused with his ancestors, the composers Henri-Guillaume Hamal and Jean-Noël Hamal. He wrote mainly sacred music, including 18 masses. He also composed the operas Le triomphe du sentiment (premiered in Liege on 28 January 1775) and Pygmalion (premiered 1781, Liege).
