= 1989 Intertoto Cup =

Tournament details
- Dates: Summer 1989
- Teams: 44

Tournament statistics
- Matches played: 132
- Goals scored: 424 (3.21 per match)

In the 1989 Intertoto Cup no knock-out rounds were contested, and therefore no winner was declared.

== Group stage ==
The teams were divided into eleven groups of four teams each.

=== Group 1 ===
Pos	Team	Pld	W	D	L	GF	GA	GD	Pts	LUZ	KAR	LIÈ	BOS
1	(Switzerland) Luzern	6	4	1	1	14	5	+9	9	—	2–0	2–0	5–0
2	(West Germany) Karlsruhe	6	4	1	1	14	9	+5	9	4–2	—	3–0	3–2
3	(Belgium) Liège	6	0	3	3	1	7	−6	3	0–0	1–1	—	0–0
4	(Netherlands) Den Bosch	6	1	1	4	6	14	−8	3	1–3	2–3	1–0	—

Source: Pawel Mogielnicki's Page
Rules for classification: 1) Points; 2) Goal difference; 3) Goals scored; 4) Head-to-head points; 5) Away goals scored; 6) Draw.

=== Group 2 ===
Pos	Team	Pld	W	D	L	GF	GA	GD	Pts	B03	MAL	NIT	ROS
1	(Denmark) Boldklubben 1903	6	4	1	1	15	8	+7	9	—	3–1	3–1	2–0
2	(Sweden) Malmö	6	2	3	1	8	8	0	7	2–1	—	0–0	2–1
3	(Czechoslovakia) Nitra	6	1	3	2	7	8	−1	5	1–3	1–1	—	3–0
4	(East Germany) Hansa Rostock	6	0	3	3	7	13	−6	3	3–3	2–2	1–1	—

Source: Pawel Mogielnicki's Page
Rules for classification: 1) Points; 2) Goal difference; 3) Goals scored; 4) Head-to-head points; 5) Away goals scored; 6) Draw.

=== Group 3 ===
Pos	Team	Pld	W	D	L	GF	GA	GD	Pts	TIN	VÁC	EVT	BEL
1	(Austria) Tirol Innsbruck	6	4	1	1	15	5	+10	9	—	1–0	4–0	4–0
2	(Hungary) Váci Izzó	6	2	3	1	3	2	+1	7	0–0	—	1–0	1–0
3	(Bulgaria) Etar Veliko Tarnovo	6	1	3	2	3	7	−4	5	2–1	0–0	—	0–0
4	(Switzerland) Bellinzona	6	0	3	3	5	12	−7	3	3–5	1–1	1–1	—

Source: Pawel Mogielnicki's Page
Rules for classification: 1) Points; 2) Goal difference; 3) Goals scored; 4) Head-to-head points; 5) Away goals scored; 6) Draw.

=== Group 4 ===
Pos	Team	Pld	W	D	L	GF	GA	GD	Pts	GCZ	GYŐ	ADM	BRØ
1	(Switzerland) Grasshopper Club	6	3	1	2	14	12	+2	7	—	2–1	4–3	3–4
2	(Hungary) Rába ETO Győr	6	3	1	2	10	8	+2	7	1–0	—	5–0	1–0
3	(Austria) Admira Wacker Wien	6	2	1	3	15	17	−2	5	2–2	5–1	—	5–0
4	(Denmark) Brøndby	6	2	1	3	11	13	−2	5	1–3	1–1	5–1	—

Source: Pawel Mogielnicki's Page
Rules for classification: 1) Points; 2) Goal difference; 3) Goals scored; 4) Head-to-head points; 5) Away goals scored; 6) Draw.

=== Group 5 ===
Pos	Team	Pld	W	D	L	GF	GA	GD	Pts	TAT	LOK	GÖT	LYN
1	(Hungary) Tatabánya	6	2	4	0	11	7	+4	8	—	0–0	5–3	3–1
2	(East Germany) Lokomotive Leipzig	6	2	3	1	10	8	+2	7	0–0	—	2–1	3–0
3	(Sweden) Göteborg	6	2	1	3	11	14	−3	5	3–3	3–1	—	1–0
4	(Denmark) Lyngby	6	1	2	3	8	11	−3	4	0–0	4–4	3–0	—

Source: Pawel Mogielnicki's Page
Rules for classification: 1) Points; 2) Goal difference; 3) Goals scored; 4) Head-to-head points; 5) Away goals scored; 6) Draw.

=== Group 6 ===
Pos	Team	Pld	W	D	L	GF	GA	GD	Pts	NÆS	KIC	STA	DJU
1	(Denmark) Næstved	6	2	3	1	13	9	+4	7	—	1–1	7–2	0–2
2	(West Germany) Stuttgarter Kickers	6	1	5	0	5	4	+1	7	2–2	—	1–1	0–0
3	(Poland) Stal Mielec	6	2	3	1	9	10	−1	7	1–1	0–0	—	1–0
4	(Sweden) Djurgården	6	1	1	4	4	8	−4	3	1–2	0–1	1–4	—

Source: Pawel Mogielnicki's Page
Rules for classification: 1) Points; 2) Goal difference; 3) Goals scored; 4) Head-to-head points; 5) Away goals scored; 6) Draw.

=== Group 7 ===
Pos	Team	Pld	W	D	L	GF	GA	GD	Pts	ÖRE	SLP	WET	SIÓ
1	(Sweden) Örebro	6	5	0	1	16	5	+11	10	—	2–0	4–1	1–2
2	(Czechoslovakia) Slavia Prague	6	3	0	3	11	10	+1	6	0–4	—	4–0	4–1
3	(Switzerland) Wettingen	6	2	0	4	9	13	−4	4	1–2	1–2	—	3–1
4	(Hungary) Siófoki Bányász	6	2	0	4	7	15	−8	4	1–3	2–1	0–3	—

Source: Pawel Mogielnicki's Page
Rules for classification: 1) Points; 2) Goal difference; 3) Goals scored; 4) Head-to-head points; 5) Away goals scored; 6) Draw.

=== Group 8 ===
Pos	Team	Pld	W	D	L	GF	GA	GD	Pts	SPA	WIS	HPT	BTA
1	(Czechoslovakia) Sparta Prague	6	4	2	0	13	4	+9	10	—	3–0	3–0	2–0
2	(Poland) Wisła Kraków	6	2	2	2	11	12	−1	6	3–3	—	0–3	4–0
3	(Israel) Hapoel Petah Tikva	6	2	1	3	9	11	−2	5	1–1	1–2	—	1–3
4	(Israel) Beitar Tel Aviv	6	1	1	4	7	13	−6	3	0–1	2–2	2–3	—

Source: Pawel Mogielnicki's Page
Rules for classification: 1) Points; 2) Goal difference; 3) Goals scored; 4) Head-to-head points; 5) Away goals scored; 6) Draw.

=== Group 9 ===
Pos	Team	Pld	W	D	L	GF	GA	GD	Pts	OST	VEJ	GRA	HAN
1	(Czechoslovakia) Baník Ostrava	6	3	2	1	8	6	+2	8	—	3–0	1–0	2–1
2	(Denmark) Vejle	6	2	3	1	11	11	0	7	1–1	—	1–1	5–4
3	(Austria) GAK	6	1	3	2	8	7	+1	5	3–0	1–1	—	1–2
4	(West Germany) Hannover 96	6	1	2	3	11	14	−3	4	1–1	1–3	2–2	—

Source: Pawel Mogielnicki's Page
Rules for classification: 1) Points; 2) Goal difference; 3) Goals scored; 4) Head-to-head points; 5) Away goals scored; 6) Draw.

=== Group 10 ===
Pos	Team	Pld	W	D	L	GF	GA	GD	Pts	ÖRG	RAP	AUE	SPA
1	(Sweden) Örgryte	6	5	0	1	10	3	+7	10	—	2–0	0–0	2–0
2	(Romania) Rapid București	6	3	0	3	13	12	+1	6	3–1	—	2–1	5–2
3	(East Germany) Wismut Aue	6	2	0	4	10	12	−2	4	0–1	3–2	—	3–1
4	(Bulgaria) Spartak Varna	6	2	0	4	10	16	−6	4	0–2	3–1	4–3	—

Source: Pawel Mogielnicki's Page
Rules for classification: 1) Points; 2) Goal difference; 3) Goals scored; 4) Head-to-head points; 5) Away goals scored; 6) Draw.

=== Group 11 ===
Pos	Team	Pld	W	D	L	GF	GA	GD	Pts	KAI	FIR	RKC	JEN
1	(West Germany) Kaiserslautern	6	3	2	1	11	8	+3	8	—	2–0	2–2	3–1
2	(Austria) First Vienna	6	3	1	2	13	11	+2	7	3–0	—	4–2	1–1
3	(Netherlands) Waalwijk	6	2	2	2	11	11	0	6	1–1	3–4	—	2–0
4	(East Germany) Carl Zeiss Jena	6	1	1	4	6	11	−5	3	1–3	3–1	0–1	—

Source: Pawel Mogielnicki's Page
Rules for classification: 1) Points; 2) Goal difference; 3) Goals scored; 4) Head-to-head points; 5) Away goals scored; 6) Draw.

== See also ==
- 1989–90 European Cup
- 1989–90 European Cup Winners' Cup
- 1989–90 UEFA Cup
