= Radomír Chýlek =

Czech footballer (born 1967)

Personal information
- Date of birth: 26 March 1967 (age 59)
- Place of birth: Čeladná, Czechoslovakia
- Position: Midfielder

Senior career*
Years	Team	Apps	(Gls)
1987–1988	VTJ Tábor		
1988–1992	FC Baník Ostrava		
1993	FC Petra Drnovice		
1994–1995	SSV Ulm 1846		
1996–1998	FK Železárny Třinec		

International career
1991	Czechoslovakia	1	(0)
- * Club domestic league appearances and goals

Radomír Chýlek (born 26 March 1967) is a retired Czech football midfielder.
