= Peter Hinds =

Barbadian footballer

Personal information
- Full name: Peter Rodney Hinds
- Date of birth: 8 June 1962 (age 64)
- Place of birth: Saint Peter, Barbados
- Position: Striker

Senior career*
Years	Team	Apps	(Gls)
- Enfield
- Bishop Auckland
- Fujita Kogyo
1989–1990	Dundee United	13	(1)
1990–1992	Marítimo	56	(14)
1992–1993	Gil Vicente	19	(3)
1997–1998	Ards	32	(2)
1998–2003	PSNI		
2003–2005	Brantwood		
2006–2007	Knockbreda		
- * Club domestic league appearances and goals

Peter Rodney Hinds (born 8 June 1962) is a Barbadian former professional footballer. After playing top division football in Japan, Scotland and Portugal, Hinds spent several years playing in Northern Ireland, where he is currently manager of Northern Amateur Football League club 1st Bangor Old Boys.

== Playing career ==
Hinds was born in Saint Peter, Barbados and moved to England in his youth. After a stint in the British Army he played non-League football as a striker for Enfield and Bishop Auckland. Next, Hinds joined Japan Soccer League team Fujita Kogyo. In 1989, he moved to Scottish League Premier Division club Dundee United where he scored twice in 18 appearances.

In 1990 Hinds moved to C.S. Marítimo of the Portuguese Divisão I, where his first season saw him finish as the club's top scorer with 10 goals in 30 games. The following season wasn't as prolific, with Hinds managing to notch up only four goals in 26 appearances. In 1992, he moved to Divisão I rivals Gil Vicente, but again, Hinds wasn't able to repeat his form of two seasons past. He scored just three goals in 19 appearances.

Hinds soon disappeared from the top level and has most recently been playing in the lower leagues of Northern Ireland, for PSNI from 2001 to 2003, Brantwood (2003–2005) and Knockbreda (2006–2007), prior to joining 1st Bangor Old Boys.

Now plays for Brentwood in the Down Area League. Whoem Brentwood are the current Champions.
