= Andreas Löbmann =

German footballer

Personal information
- Date of birth: 20 February 1963 (age 63)
- Height: 1.83 m (6 ft 0 in)
- Position: Forward

Senior career*
Years	Team	Apps	(Gls)
1982–1989	1860 Munich		
1989–1990	FC Wettingen		
1990–1991	Young Boys		
1991–1992	Blau-Weiß 1890 Berlin	18	(5)
1992–1993	1860 Munich		
- * Club domestic league appearances and goals

Andreas Löbmann (born 20 February 1963) is a German former professional footballer who played as a forward.
