= Alvaro López (footballer, born 1954) =

Swiss footballer

Personal information
- Date of birth: 27 March 1954 (age 72)
- Place of birth: Chalais, Switzerland
- Position: Midfielder

Senior career*
| Years | Team | Apps | (Gls) |
| 1973–1977 | FC Sion | | |
| 1977–1981 | CS Chênois | | |
| 1981–1982 | FC Sion | | |
- * Club domestic league appearances and goals

Alvaro López (born 27 March 1954) is a retired Swiss football midfielder.
