= Pierre Petry =

Luxembourgish footballer

Personal information
- Date of birth: 13 July 1961 (age 65)
- Position: Defender

Senior career*
| Years | Team | Apps | (Gls) |
| 1984–1988 | Progrès Niederkorn | | |
| 1988–1993 | Jeunesse Esch | | |
| 1993–1996 | CS Grevenmacher | | |

International career
| 1984–1993 | Luxembourg | 29 | (0) |
- * Club domestic league appearances and goals

Pierre Petry (born 13 July 1961) is a retired Luxembourgish football defender.
