= Lutz Wienhold =

East German footballer

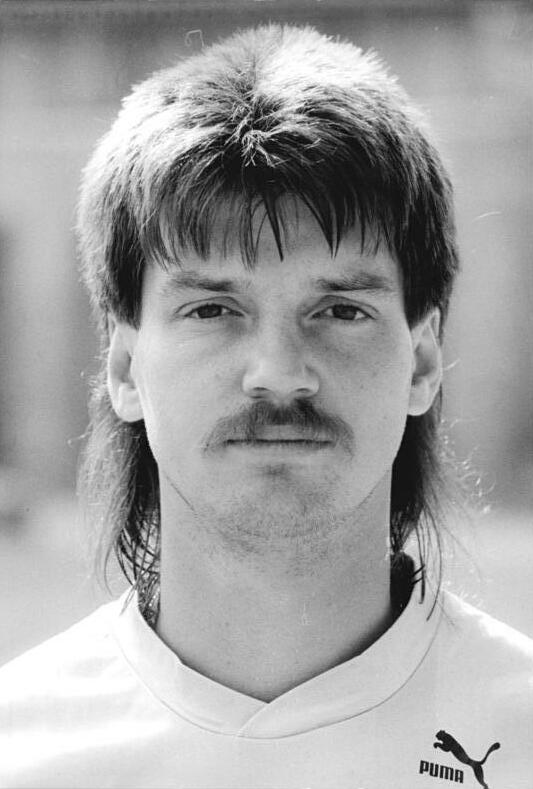
- Wienhold in 1990

Personal information
- Date of birth: 15 September 1965 (age 61)
- Place of birth: Karl-Marx-Stadt, East Germany
- Position: Midfielder

Youth career
- 1974–1984: FC Karl-Marx-Stadt

Senior career*
Years	Team	Apps	(Gls)
1984–1991	Chemnitzer FC	133	(17)
1991–1992	Alpine Donawitz	21	(0)
1992–2000	Chemnitzer FC	183	(13)
Total		337	(30)

International career
	East Germany U-21	5	(0)
- * Club domestic league appearances and goals

Lutz Wienhold (born 15 September 1965) is a German former professional footballer.
