= Thomas Laudeley =

German footballer

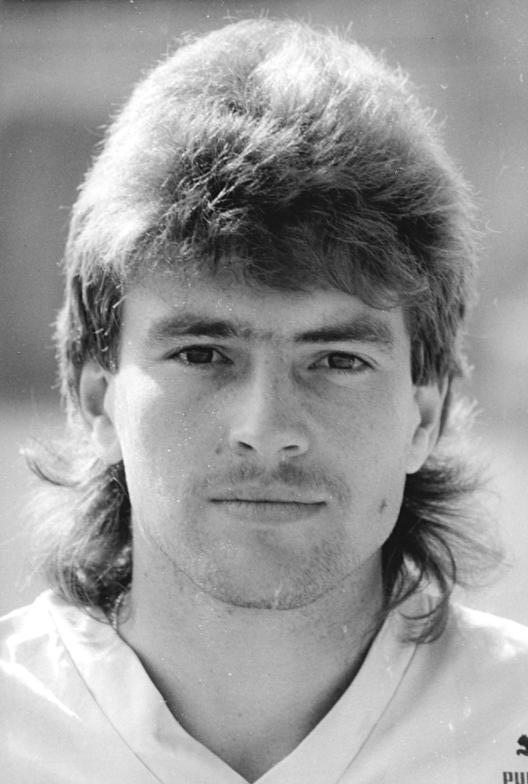

Personal information
- Date of birth: 18 November 1966 (age 59)
- Place of birth: Karl-Marx-Stadt, East Germany
- Height: 1.74 m (5 ft 8 1/2 in)
- Position: Defender

Youth career
- –1975: SG Adelsberg
- 1975–1985: FC Karl-Marx-Stadt

Senior career*
Years	Team	Apps	(Gls)
1985–2001	Chemnitzer FC	388	(12)
2001–2005	VfB Chemnitz		

International career
	East Germany U-21	15	(0)
- * Club domestic league appearances and goals

Thomas Laudeley (born 18 November 1966) is a German former footballer.
