= Jean-Noël Hamal =

Jean-Noël Hamal (Liège, 23 December 1709 - 26 November 1778) was Baroque-era composer. A Walloon, Hamal was director of music at Saint-Lambert Cathedral. He was the first person to play the piano in Liège cathedral.
