= 1990–91 in Swiss football =

Football in Switzerland
- Season: 1990–91

Men's football
- Nationalliga A: Grasshopper Club
- Nationalliga B: No champions declared
- 1. Liga: Group 1: Martigny-Sports; Group 2: Colombier; Group 3: Solothurn; Group 4: Brüttisellen
- Swiss Cup: Sion

Women's football
- Swiss Women's Super League: SV Seebach Zürich
- Swiss Cup: FC Bern women's section

The following is a summary of the 1990–91 season of competitive football in Switzerland.

== Nationalliga A ==
=== Qualification phase ===
Pos	Team	Pld	W	D	L	GF	GA	GD	Pts	Qualification
1	Sion	22	10	10	2	31	20	+11	30	Advance to championship round halved points (rounded up) as bonus
2	Grasshopper Club	22	9	9	4	29	17	+12	27	Advance to championship round halved points (rounded up) as bonus
3	Xamax	22	8	10	4	25	15	+10	26	Advance to championship round halved points (rounded up) as bonus
4	Lausanne-Sport	22	9	8	5	39	30	+9	26	Advance to championship round halved points (rounded up) as bonus
5	Lugano	22	8	9	5	27	22	+5	25	Advance to championship round halved points (rounded up) as bonus
6	Servette	22	9	6	7	30	27	+3	24	Advance to championship round halved points (rounded up) as bonus
7	Young Boys	22	6	11	5	35	26	+9	23	Advance to championship round halved points (rounded up) as bonus
8	Luzern	22	8	7	7	30	28	+2	23	Advance to championship round halved points (rounded up) as bonus
9	FC St. Gallen	22	7	8	7	26	26	0	22	Continue to promotion/relegation round
10	Aarau	22	3	9	10	19	30	−11	15	Continue to promotion/relegation round
11	Zürich	22	3	6	13	21	45	−24	12	Continue to promotion/relegation round
12	FC Wettingen	22	3	5	14	24	50	−26	11	Continue to promotion/relegation round

Source: rsssf.com
Rules for classification: 1) Points; 2) Goal difference; 3) Goals scored; 4) Head-to-head points; 5) Away goals scored; 6) Draw.

=== Championship group ===
The first eight teams of the qualification phase competed in the Championship round. The teams took half of the points (rounded up to complete units) gained in the qualification as bonus with them.

Pos	Team	Pld	W	D	L	GF	GA	GD	BP	Pts	Qualification
1	Grasshopper Club	14	7	5	2	27	15	+12	14	33	Swiss champions, qualified for 1991–92 European Cup and entered 1991 Intertoto Cup
2	Sion	14	3	8	3	14	15	−1	15	29	Swiss Cup winners, qualified for 1991–92 Cup Winners' Cup
3	Xamax	14	5	6	3	16	13	+3	13	29	Qualified for 1991–92 UEFA Cup and entered 1991 Intertoto Cup
4	Lausanne-Sport	14	5	6	3	15	13	+2	13	29	Qualified for 1991–92 UEFA Cup and entered 1991 Intertoto Cup
5	Lugano	14	5	4	5	16	15	+1	13	27	Entered 1991 Intertoto Cup
6	Young Boys	14	3	6	5	21	26	−5	12	24	
7	Servette	14	1	9	4	16	24	−8	12	23	
8	Luzern	14	3	4	7	16	20	−4	12	22	

Source: rsssf.com
Rules for classification: 1) points; 2) Position in the qualification.

== Nationalliga B ==
=== Qualification phase ===
Group East

Pos	Team	Pld	W	D	L	GF	GA	GD	Pts	Qualification
1	Locarno	22	13	6	3	44	23	+21	32	Promotion round
2	Baden	22	13	5	4	41	19	+22	31	Promotion round
3	Schaffhausen	22	12	4	6	45	29	+16	28	Promotion round
4	Basel	22	9	8	5	40	30	+10	26	Promotion round
5	Zug	22	8	10	4	29	22	+7	26	Promotion round
6	Chiasso	22	10	5	7	43	26	+17	25	Promotion round
7	Bellinzona	22	7	6	9	34	32	+2	20	Relegation group
8	Winterthur	22	7	6	9	26	35	−9	20	Relegation group
9	Chur	22	5	7	10	20	25	−5	17	Relegation group
10	FC Glarus	22	4	6	12	23	58	−35	14	Relegation group
11	Emmenbrücke	22	3	7	12	18	39	−21	13	Relegation group
12	Kriens	22	4	4	14	22	47	−25	12	Relegation group

Source: rsssf.com
Rules for classification: 1) Points; 2) Goal difference; 3) Goals scored; 4) Head-to-head points; 5) Away goals scored; 6) Draw.

Group West

Pos	Team	Pld	W	D	L	GF	GA	GD	Pts	Qualification
1	Yverdon-Sport	22	14	6	2	49	21	+28	34	Promotion round
2	BSC Old Boys	22	12	6	4	56	38	+18	30	Promotion round
3	Etoile Carouge	22	11	7	4	38	31	+7	29	Promotion round
4	FC La Chaux-de-Fonds	22	9	9	4	52	37	+15	27	Promotion round
5	FC Fribourg	22	8	8	6	54	36	+18	24	Promotion round
6	Urania Genève Sport	22	9	6	7	45	33	+12	24	Promotion round
7	FC Grenchen	22	9	5	8	42	27	+15	23	Relegation group
8	FC Bulle	22	7	6	9	31	35	−4	20	Relegation group
9	ES Malley	22	3	12	7	22	33	−11	18	Relegation group
10	Montreux-Sports	22	4	7	11	27	47	−20	15	Relegation group
11	CS Chênois	22	2	7	13	19	53	−34	11	Relegation group
12	SC Burgdorf	22	1	7	14	9	53	−44	9	Relegation group

Source: rsssf.com
Rules for classification: 1) Points; 2) Goal difference; 3) Goals scored; 4) Head-to-head points; 5) Away goals scored; 6) Draw.

=== Promotion/relegation round NLA/NLB ===
Group A

Pos	Team	Pld	W	D	L	GF	GA	GD	Pts	Qualification
1	St. Gallen	14	10	2	2	33	11	+22	22	Remain in NLA 1991–92
2	Wettingen	14	9	2	3	25	15	+10	20	Remain in NLA 1991–92
3	Chiasso	14	6	4	4	19	21	−2	16	Remain in NLB 1991–92
4	Basel	14	4	4	6	18	17	+1	12	Remain in NLB 1991–92
5	Yverdon-Sports	14	5	2	7	21	22	−1	12	Remain in NLB 1991–92
6	Fribourg	14	4	3	7	18	25	−7	11	Remain in NLB 1991–92
7	Baden	14	4	3	7	19	26	−7	11	Remain in NLB 1991–92
8	Etoile Carouge	14	4	0	10	16	32	−16	8	Remain in NLB 1991–92

Source: rsssf.com
Rules for classification: 1) Points; 2) Goal difference; 3) Goals scored; 4) Head-to-head points; 5) Away goals scored; 6) Draw.

Group B

Pos	Team	Pld	W	D	L	GF	GA	GD	Pts	Qualification
1	FC Zürich	14	7	7	0	28	10	+18	21	Remain in NLA 1991–92
2	FC Aarau	14	7	6	1	28	12	+16	20	Remain in NLA 1991–92
3	FC Schaffhausen	14	8	2	4	19	12	+7	18	Remain in NLB 1991–92
4	FC Locarno	14	6	5	3	18	13	+5	17	Remain in NLB 1991–92
5	FC La Chaux-de-Fonds	14	5	2	7	27	26	+1	12	Remain in NLB 1991–92
6	Urania Genève Sport	14	2	7	5	16	27	−11	11	Remain in NLB 1991–92
7	SC Zug	14	2	3	9	14	29	−15	7	Remain in NLB 1991–92
8	BSC Old Boys	14	2	2	10	11	32	−21	6	Remain in NLB 1991–92

Source: rsssf.com
Rules for classification: 1) Points; 2) Goal difference; 3) Goals scored; 4) Head-to-head points; 5) Away goals scored; 6) Draw.

=== Relegation round NLB/1. Liga ===
The last six teams in each of the two qualification phase groups competed in two relegation groups against relegation to the 1. Liga 1991–92. The teams received ranking bonus points from their qualifying groups (7th place 6 pts; 8th place 5 pts; 9th place 4 pts; etc). There was to be one direct relegation in each group, plus a play-out against relegation between both second last placed teams.

Group A

Pos	Team	Pld	W	D	L	GF	GA	GD	BP	Pts	Qualification
1	FC Winterthur	10	5	4	1	14	6	+8	5	19	Remain in NLB 1991–92
2	FC Grenchen	10	5	2	3	16	14	+2	6	18	Remain in NLB 1991–92
3	SC Kriens	10	6	1	3	17	13	+4	1	14	Remain in NLB 1991–92
4	ES FC Malley	10	3	2	5	8	10	−2	4	12	Remain in NLB 1991–92
5	FC Glarus	10	2	4	4	13	17	−4	3	11	Play-out against relegation
6	CS Chênois	10	1	3	6	10	18	−8	2	7	Relegated to 1991–92 1. Liga

Source: rsssf.com
Rules for classification: 1) Points; 2) Goal difference; 3) Goals scored; 4) Head-to-head points; 5) Away goals scored; 6) Draw.

Group B

Pos	Team	Pld	W	D	L	GF	GA	GD	BP	Pts	Qualification
1	FC Bulle	10	6	3	1	26	7	+19	5	20	Remain in NLB 1991–92
2	AC Bellinzona	10	3	4	3	14	15	−1	6	16	Remain in NLB 1991–92
3	FC Chur	10	3	5	2	10	7	+3	4	15	Remain in NLB 1991–92
4	FC Emmenbrücke	10	4	1	5	13	15	−2	2	11	Remain in NLB 1991–92
5	FC Montreux-Sports	10	1	5	4	4	16	−12	3	10	Play-out against relegation
6	SC Burgdorf	10	1	6	3	8	15	−7	1	9	Relegated to 1991–92 1. Liga

Source: rsssf.com
Rules for classification: 1) Points; 2) Goal difference; 3) Goals scored; 4) Head-to-head points; 5) Away goals scored; 6) Draw.

=== Relegation play-out ===
Team 1	Score	Team 2
FC Glarus	2–1	FC Montreux-Sports
FC Montreux-Sports	3–1	FC Glarus

FC Montreux-Sports won 4–3 on aggregate. Glarus were originally relegated, however, because Montreux-Sports had their license revoked, Glarus remained in NLB 1991–92 and Montreux-Sports were demoted to the 1991–92 1. Liga.

== 1. Liga ==
=== Group 1 ===
Pos	Team	Pld	W	D	L	GF	GA	GD	Pts	Qualification or relegation
1	FC Martigny-Sports	26	16	5	5	66	39	+27	37	Play-off to Nationalliga B
2	FC Châtel-Saint-Denis	26	15	6	5	53	24	+29	36	To decider for second place
3	FC Monthey	26	14	8	4	57	26	+31	36	To decider for second place
4	FC Savièse	26	12	7	7	51	41	+10	31	
5	FC Fully	26	10	8	8	49	43	+6	28	
6	FC Echallens	26	10	5	11	44	49	−5	25	
7	FC Versoix	26	9	7	10	43	57	−14	25	
8	FC Collex-Bossy	26	9	6	11	41	39	+2	24	
9	FC Renens	26	7	10	9	40	40	0	24	
10	FC Aigle	26	9	6	11	45	51	−6	24	
11	FC Raron	26	7	9	10	32	39	−7	23	
12	Concordia/Folgore Lausanne	26	7	7	12	40	53	−13	21	Decider for twelfth place
13	Vevey Sports	26	7	7	12	45	47	−2	21	Decider for twelfth place
14	FC Jorat-Mezieres	26	3	3	20	26	84	−58	9	Relegation to 2. Liga Interregional

Source: RSSSF
Rules for classification: 1) Points; 2) Goal difference within the league, but decider play-off for qualifiers.

==== Decider for second place ====
The decider was played on 21 May in Montreux

Team 1	Score	Team 2
FC Monthey	0–1	FC Châtel-Saint-Denis

FC Châtel-Saint-Denis win and advance to play-offs.

==== Decider for twelfth place ====
The decider was played on 21 May in Renens

Team 1	Score	Team 2
Concordia/Folgore Lausanne	1–0	Vevey Sports

Concordia/Folgore Lausanne win and advance to play-outs. Vevey Sports are relegation to 2. Liga Interregional.

=== Group 2 ===
Pos	Team	Pld	W	D	L	GF	GA	GD	Pts	Qualification or relegation
1	FC Colombier	26	17	6	3	63	23	+40	40	Play-off to Nationalliga B
2	SR Delémont	26	18	3	5	68	26	+42	39	Play-off to Nationalliga B
3	FC Münsingen	26	12	5	9	40	30	+10	29	
4	FC Laufen	26	10	9	7	41	36	+5	29	
5	SV Lyss	26	9	10	7	49	42	+7	28	
6	SC Bümpliz 78	26	11	6	9	45	40	+5	28	
7	FC Lerchenfeld	26	7	13	6	43	38	+5	27	
8	FC Moutier	26	9	6	11	44	50	−6	24	
9	FC Domdidier	26	9	6	11	40	53	−13	24	
10	FC Bern	26	8	7	11	35	34	+1	23	
11	FC Thun	26	9	5	12	44	55	−11	23	
12	FC Beauregard Fribourg	26	9	5	12	40	50	−10	23	Play-out against relegation
13	FC Le Locle	26	7	6	13	37	44	−7	20	Relegation to 2. Liga Interregional
14	FC Breitenbach	26	2	3	21	27	95	−68	7	Relegation to 2. Liga Interregional

Source: RSSSF
Rules for classification: 1) Points; 2) Goal difference within the league, but decider play-off for qualifiers.

=== Group 3 ===
Pos	Team	Pld	W	D	L	GF	GA	GD	Pts	Qualification or relegation
1	FC Solothurn	26	14	8	4	48	23	+25	36	Play-off to Nationalliga B
2	FC Pratteln	26	12	10	4	39	23	+16	34	To decider for second place
3	SC Buochs	26	13	8	5	32	17	+15	34	To decider for second place
4	FC Riehen	26	13	7	6	36	22	+14	33	
5	FC Mendrisio	26	11	7	8	45	35	+10	29	
6	FC Klus-Balsthal	26	10	7	9	32	34	−2	27	
7	FC Sursee	26	8	10	8	25	23	+2	26	
8	FC Ascona	26	8	10	8	30	30	0	26	
9	FC Altstetten (Zürich)	26	9	8	9	28	35	−7	26	
10	FC Tresa/Monteggio	26	8	7	11	39	45	−6	23	
11	FC Zug	26	5	13	8	25	29	−4	23	
12	FC Suhr	26	5	9	12	32	42	−10	19	Play-out against relegation
13	FC Brugg	26	2	10	14	16	39	−23	14	Relegation to 2. Liga Interregional
14	FC Nordstern Basel	26	5	4	17	30	60	−30	14	Relegation to 2. Liga Interregional

Source: RSSSF
Rules for classification: 1) Points; 2) Goal difference within the league, but decider play-off for qualifiers.

==== Decider for second place ====
The decider was played on 21 May 1991 at the Stadion Schlottermilch in Sursee

Team 1	Score	Team 2
SC Buochs	0–3	FC Pratteln

FC Pratteln win and advance to play-offs.

=== Group 4 ===
Pos	Team	Pld	W	D	L	GF	GA	GD	Pts	Qualification or relegation
1	FC Brüttisellen	26	17	6	3	55	18	+37	40	Play-off to Nationalliga B
2	SC Brühl	26	15	10	1	39	14	+25	40	Play-off to Nationalliga B
3	FC Young Fellows Zürich	26	10	12	4	43	29	+14	32	
4	FC Rorschach	26	10	12	4	40	33	+7	32	
5	FC Red Star Zürich	26	11	8	7	33	29	+4	30	
6	FC Tuggen	26	10	8	8	48	39	+9	28	
7	FC Herisau	26	10	8	8	42	36	+6	28	
8	FC Frauenfeld	26	10	8	8	30	29	+1	28	
9	FC Kreuzlingen	26	8	5	13	35	53	−18	21	
10	FC Altstätten (St. Gallen)	26	6	8	12	26	38	−12	20	
11	FC Balzers	26	7	6	13	33	48	−15	20	
12	SC Veltheim	26	6	6	14	27	45	−18	18	Decider for twelfth place
13	FC Einsiedeln	26	6	6	14	35	43	−8	18	Decider for twelfth place
14	FC Kilchberg	26	3	3	20	20	52	−32	9	Relegation to 2. Liga Interregional

Source: RSSSF
Rules for classification: 1) Points; 2) Goal difference within the league, but decider play-off for qualifiers.

==== Decider for twelfth place ====
The decider was played on 21 May in Altstetten (Zürich)

Team 1	Score	Team 2
FC Einsiedeln	1–2	SC Veltheim

SC Veltheim win and advance to play-outs. FC Einsiedeln are relegation to 2. Liga Interregional.

=== Promotion play-off ===
Qualification round

Team 1	Score	Team 2
FC Pratteln	2–0	FC Brüttisellen
FC Brüttisellen	3–0	FC Pratteln

FC Brüttisellen win 3–2 on aggregate and continue to the finals.

Team 1	Score	Team 2
SC Brühl	0–0	FC Solothurn
FC Solothurn	0–1	SC Brühl

SC Brühl win 1–0 on aggregate and continue to the finals.

Team 1	Score	Team 2
SR Delémont	5–0	FC Martigny-Sports
FC Martigny-Sports	2–3	SR Delémont

SR Delémont win 8–2 on aggregate and continue to the finals.

Team 1	Score	Team 2
FC Châtel-Saint-Denis	3–1	FC Colombier
FC Colombier	1–2	FC Châtel-Saint-Denis

FC Châtel-Saint-Denis win 5–2 on aggregate and continue to the finals.

Final round

Team 1	Score	Team 2
SC Brühl	0–1	FC Châtel-Saint-Denis
FC Châtel-Saint-Denis	1–1	SC Brühl

FC Châtel-Saint-Denis win 2–1 on aggregate and are promoted to 1991–92 Nationalliga B.

Team 1	Score	Team 2
FC Brüttisellen	1–5	SR Delémont
SR Delémont	3–0	FC Brüttisellen

SR Delémont win 8–1 on aggregate and are promoted to 1991–92 Nationalliga B.

Play-off for third place

Team 1	Score	Team 2
FC Brüttisellen	0–0 a.e.t. 5–3 pen.	SC Brühl

FC Brüttisellen win after penalty shoot-out and are promoted to 1991–92 Nationalliga B.

=== Relegation play-out ===
First round

Team 1	Score	Team 2
Concordia/Folgore Lausanne	2–2 a.e.t. 3–1 pen.	FC Beauregard Fribourg

Concordia/Folgore Lausanne win after penalty shoot-out. FC Beauregard Fribourg continue to the final.

Team 1	Score	Team 2
SC Veltheim	1–1 a.e.t. 0–3 pen.	FC Suhr

FC Suhr win after penalty shoot-out. SC Veltheim continue to the final.

Final round

Team 1	Score	Team 2
FC Beauregard Fribourg	2–2	SC Veltheim
SC Veltheim	2–1	FC Beauregard Fribourg

SC Veltheim win 4–3 on aggregate. FC Beauregard Fribourg are relegated to 2. Liga.

== Swiss Cup ==
=== Early rounds ===
The routes of the finalists to the final, played on 8 June 1992 at the Wankdorf in Bern:

Round 3

Team 1	Score	Team 2
30 September 1990
FC Fully	1–3	FC Sion
FC Bassecourt	0–7	BSC Young Boys

Round 4

Team 1	Score	Team 2
24 March 1991
FC Raron	0–2	FC Sion
FC Fribourg	0–1	BSC Young Boys

Round 5

Team 1	Score	Team 2
9 April 1991
FC Locarno	0–1 (a.e.t.)	FC Sion
BSC Young Boys	3–0	FC Schaffhausen

Quarter-finals

Team 1	Score	Team 2
23 April 1991
FC Sion	1–0 (a.e.t.)	FC St. Gallen
BSC Young Boys	2–0	Grasshoppers

Semi-finals

Team 1	Score	Team 2
7 May 1991
FC Sion	2–1	FC Chiasso
BSC Young Boys	4–1	FC Zürich

=== Final ===
20 May 1991
15:00

FC Sion	3 – 2	BSC Young Boys
Orlando 50', 80'; Rey 81'	Report	4' (o.g.) Piffaretti; 47' Zuffi

Wankdorf, Bern
Attendance: 50,000
Referee: (Switzerland) Kurt Röthlisberger (Suhr)

== Swiss Clubs in Europe ==
- Grasshopper Club as 1989–90 Nationalliga A champions: 1990–91 European Cup and entered 1990 Intertoto Cup
- Lausanne-Sport as league second placed team: 1990–91 UEFA Cup
- Xamax as Swiss Cup finalist qualified for 1990–91 Cup Winners' Cup and entered 1990 Intertoto Cup
- Luzern as league second placed team: 1990–91 UEFA Cup and entered 1990 Intertoto Cup
- St. Gallen: entered 1990 Intertoto Cup

=== Grasshopper Club ===
==== European Cup ====
===== First round =====
19 September 1990 First leg	Red Star Belgrade (Socialist Federal Republic of Yugoslavia)	1–1	(Switzerland) Grasshopper	Marakana, Belgrade
17:30 CEST	Binić 43'	Report	Közle 14'	Attendance: 50,157; Referee: Carlo Longhi (Italy)

3 October 1990 Second leg	Grasshopper (Switzerland)	1–4	(Socialist Federal Republic of Yugoslavia) Red Star Belgrade	Hardturm, Zürich
20:00 CEST	Közle 62' (pen.)	Report	Pančev 11'; Prosinečki 49' (pen.), 84' (pen.); Radinović 58'	Attendance: 25,500; Referee: José Rosa dos Santos (Portugal)

Red Star Belgrade won 5–2 on aggregate.

==== Intertoto Cup ====
===== Group 10 =====
Pos	Team	Pld	W	D	L	GF	GA	GD	Pts	UER	OLI	DYN	GCZ
1	(West Germany) Bayer Uerdingen	6	3	2	1	11	7	+4	8	—	2–1	3–0	2–2
2	(Socialist Federal Republic of Yugoslavia) Olimpija Ljubljana	6	2	2	2	10	8	+2	6	1–1	—	1–0	4–1
3	(East Germany) FC Berlin	6	2	1	3	7	9	−2	5	1–2	1–1	—	2–1
4	(Switzerland) Grasshopper Club	6	2	1	3	10	14	−4	5	2–1	3–2	1–3	—

Source: Pawel Mogielnicki's Page 1990
Rules for classification: 1) Points; 2) Goal difference; 3) Goals scored; 4) Head-to-head points; 5) Away goals scored; 6) Draw.

=== Lausanne-Sport ===
==== UEFA Cup ====
===== First round =====
19 September 1990 First leg	Lausanne (Switzerland)	3–2	(Spain) Real Sociedad	Stade Olympique de la Pontaise, Lausanne
20:00	Hottiger 50', 89'; Chapuisat 77'	Report	Lumbreras 16'; Gajate 27'	Attendance: 20,600; Referee: Manfred Roßner (East Germany)

2 October 1990 Second leg	Real Sociedad (Spain)	1–0	(Switzerland) Lausanne	Atotxa, San Sebastián
19:15	Aldridge 55'	Report		Attendance: 18,725; Referee: Gérard Biguet (France)

3–3 on aggregate; Real Sociedad won on away goals.

=== Xamax ===
==== Cup Winners' Cup ====
===== First round =====
19 September 1990 First leg	Estrela da Amadora (Portugal)	1–1	(Switzerland) Neuchâtel Xamax	Estádio José Gomes, Amadora
	Ricky 26'	Report	Sutter 57'	Attendance: 6,000; Referee: Alphonse Constantin (Belgium)

3 October 1990 Second leg	Neuchâtel Xamax (Switzerland)	1–1 (a.e.t.) (3–4 p)	(Portugal) Estrela da Amadora	Stade de la Maladière, Neuchâtel
	Sutter 49'	Report	Valério 82'	Attendance: 12,400; Referee: Dušan Krchňák (Czechoslovakia)
	Penalties
	Sutter (penalty scored); Gigon (penalty scored); Fernandez (penalty scored); Froidevaux (penalty missed); Egli (penalty missed)		(penalty scored) Valério; (penalty scored) Rui Neves; (penalty scored) Dimas; (penalty scored) Paulo Jorge

2–2 on aggregate. Estrela da Amadora won 4–3 on penalties.

==== Intertoto Cup ====
===== Group 1 =====
Pos	Team	Pld	W	D	L	GF	GA	GD	Pts	NEU	SPA	LYN	ADM
1	(Switzerland) Neuchâtel Xamax	6	5	0	1	9	2	+7	10	—	0–1	2–0	1–0
2	(Czechoslovakia) Sparta Prague	6	4	1	1	13	9	+4	9	0–3	—	1–0	4–1
3	(Denmark) Lyngby BK	6	2	0	4	9	12	−3	4	1–2	2–4	—	4–2
4	(Austria) Admira Wacker Wien	6	0	1	5	7	15	−8	1	0–1	3–3	1–2	—

Source: Pawel Mogielnicki's Page 1990
Rules for classification: 1) Points; 2) Goal difference; 3) Goals scored; 4) Head-to-head points; 5) Away goals scored; 6) Draw.

=== Luzern ===
==== UEFA Cup ====
===== First round =====
19 September 1990 First leg	MTK (Hungary)	1–1	(Switzerland) Luzern	Hungária körúti stadion, Budapest
17:00	Cservenkai 44'	Report	Knup 16'	Attendance: 1,480; Referee: Rodger Gifford (Wales)

2 October 1990 Second leg	Luzern (Switzerland)	2–1	(Hungary) MTK	Stadion Allmend, Lucerne
20:00	Van Eck 54'; Nadig 80'	Report	Kardos 70'	Attendance: 10,350; Referee: Ildefonso Urizar Azpitarte (Spain)

Luzern won 3–2 on aggregate.

===== Second round =====
24 October 1990 First leg	Luzern (Switzerland)	0–1	(Austria) Admira Wacker	Stadion Allmend, Lucerne
20:00		Report	Binder 71'	Attendance: 9,500; Referee: Ivan Grégr (Czechoslovakia)

7 November 1990 Second leg	Admira Wacker (Austria)	1–1	(Switzerland) Luzern	Bundesstadion Südstadt, Maria Enzersdorf
19:30	Marschall 51'	Report	Marini 88'	Attendance: 3,286; Referee: Vadim Zhuk (Soviet Union)

Admira Wacker won 2–1 on aggregate.

==== Intertoto Cup ====
===== Group 7 =====
Pos	Team	Pld	W	D	L	GF	GA	GD	Pts	LUZ	NIT	ÖRE	TAT
1	(Switzerland) Luzern	6	4	1	1	13	8	+5	9	—	1–1	3–0	3–2
2	(Czechoslovakia) Plastika Nitra	6	2	3	1	6	3	+3	7	0–2	—	1–0	4–0
3	(Sweden) Örebro	6	2	2	2	8	6	+2	6	2–0	0–0	—	5–1
4	(Hungary) Tatabánya	6	0	2	4	7	17	−10	2	3–4	0–0	1–1	—

Source: Pawel Mogielnicki's Page 1990
Rules for classification: 1) Points; 2) Goal difference; 3) Goals scored; 4) Head-to-head points; 5) Away goals scored; 6) Draw.

=== St. Gallen ===
==== Intertoto Cup ====
===== Group 2 =====
Pos	Team	Pld	W	D	L	GF	GA	GD	Pts	TIN	BOC	STG	SLS
1	(Austria) Tirol Innsbruck	6	4	1	1	12	6	+6	9	—	1–0	1–1	4–1
2	(West Germany) Bochum	6	3	1	2	8	6	+2	7	2–3	—	2–1	1–0
3	(Switzerland) St. Gallen	6	3	1	2	8	7	+1	7	2–1	0–2	—	2–1
4	(Bulgaria) Slavia Sofia	6	0	1	5	3	12	−9	1	0–2	1–1	0–2	—

Source: Pawel Mogielnicki's Page 1990
Rules for classification: 1) Points; 2) Goal difference; 3) Goals scored; 4) Head-to-head points; 5) Away goals scored; 6) Draw.

== Sources ==
- Switzerland 1990–91 at RSSSF
- Cup finals at Fussball-Schweiz
- Intertoto history at Pawel Mogielnicki's Page
- Josef Zindel (2018). FC Basel 1893. Die ersten 125 Jahre (in German). Basel: Friedrich Reinhardt Verlag. ISBN 978-3-7245-2305-5.

Preceded by 1989–90	Seasons in Swiss football	Succeeded by 1991–92
