= 1989–90 Nationalliga A =

Swiss football season

Nationalliga A
- Season: 1989–90
- Champions: Grasshopper Club
- Relegated: Bellinzona
- Top goalscorer: Iván Zamorano; St. Gallen (23 goals)

Nationalliga B
- Season: 1989–90
- Champions: No team was declared champions
- Promoted: Zürich
- Relegated: FC Zug; FC Brüttisellen; FC Martigny-Sports
- Top goalscorer: n/a

Statistics of the Swiss National League in the 1989–90 football season, both Nationalliga A and Nationalliga B.

== Overview ==
The 36 clubs of the Swiss Football League (Nationalliga) were divided into two tiers. In the top-tier, there were 12 teams that played in the Nationalliga A (NLA). There were 24 teams in the Nationalliga B (NLB), the second tier, these were divided into two groups, a West and an East group. Each team in each group played a double round-robin in the qualification phase. Thereafter the divisions were divided into a Swiss championship group with the top eight teams from the qualification and two promotion/relegation groups (NLA/NLB), both with eight teams. These were the bottom four teams from the NLA qualification and the top six teams from both of the NLB qualification groups. Further, there were two relegation groups (NLB/1. Liga), each group with six teams. The last team in each NLB relegation group were to be relegated directly and the two fifth placed teams in each group played a play-out against relegation to decide the third relegation slot.

== Nationalliga A ==
=== Qualification phase ===
The qualification stage of the NLA began on 22 July 1989 and was completed on 10 December. The top eight teams in the qualification phase would advance to the championship group and the last four teams would play against relegation.

==== Table ====
| Pos | Team | Pld | W | D | L | GF | GA | GD | Pts | Qualification |
|---|---|---|---|---|---|---|---|---|---|---|
| 1 | St. Gallen | 22 | 9 | 10 | 3 | 40 | 24 | +16 | 28 | Advance to championship round halved points (rounded up) as bonus |
| 2 | Xamax | 22 | 11 | 5 | 6 | 38 | 32 | +6 | 27 | Advance to championship round halved points (rounded up) as bonus |
| 3 | Grasshopper Club | 22 | 9 | 7 | 6 | 31 | 24 | +7 | 25 | Advance to championship round halved points (rounded up) as bonus |
| 4 | Luzern | 22 | 9 | 6 | 7 | 39 | 29 | +10 | 24 | Advance to championship round halved points (rounded up) as bonus |
| 5 | Sion | 22 | 9 | 5 | 8 | 29 | 31 | −2 | 23 | Advance to championship round halved points (rounded up) as bonus |
| 6 | Lausanne-Sport | 22 | 6 | 10 | 6 | 28 | 27 | +1 | 22 | Advance to championship round halved points (rounded up) as bonus |
| 7 | Lugano | 22 | 8 | 6 | 8 | 36 | 35 | +1 | 22 | Advance to championship round halved points (rounded up) as bonus |
| 8 | Young Boys | 22 | 7 | 7 | 8 | 29 | 29 | 0 | 21 | Advance to championship round halved points (rounded up) as bonus |
| 9 | Servette | 22 | 7 | 7 | 8 | 34 | 36 | −2 | 21 | Continue to promotion/relegation round |
| 10 | Wettingen | 22 | 7 | 5 | 10 | 18 | 27 | −9 | 19 | Continue to promotion/relegation round |
| 11 | Aarau | 22 | 5 | 7 | 10 | 20 | 30 | −10 | 17 | Continue to promotion/relegation round |
| 12 | Bellinzona | 22 | 5 | 5 | 12 | 31 | 49 | −18 | 15 | Continue to promotion/relegation round |

Source: rsssf.com
Rules for classification: 1) Points; 2) Goal difference; 3) Goals scored; 4) Head-to-head points; 5) Away goals scored; 6) Draw.

==== Results ====
| Home \ Away | AAR | BEL | GCZ | LS | LUG | LUZ | NX | SER | SIO | STG | WET | YB |
|---|---|---|---|---|---|---|---|---|---|---|---|---|
| Aarau | | 1–2 | 1–1 | 2–0 | 0–3 | 0–0 | 2–1 | 1–2 | 2–1 | 1–2 | 1–2 | 1–1 |
| Bellinzona | 2–3 | | 4–2 | 2–2 | 2–2 | 1–3 | 0–0 | 2–5 | 1–2 | 2–1 | 0–2 | 2–1 |
| Grasshopper Club | 1–2 | 2–0 | | 1–2 | 5–0 | 1–0 | 1–0 | 1–1 | 1–0 | 1–0 | 1–1 | 3–1 |
| Lausanne-Sport | 0–0 | 5–1 | 1–1 | | 1–1 | 1–1 | 1–1 | 2–3 | 4–1 | 1–1 | 1–0 | 1–2 |
| Lugano | 3–0 | 2–0 | 1–2 | 1–1 | | 2–2 | 6–1 | 4–0 | 1–0 | 2–1 | 2–1 | 1–1 |
| Luzern | 3–0 | 2–2 | 4–2 | 3–0 | 3–0 | | 1–0 | 1–2 | 2–2 | 1–1 | 1–0 | 1–0 |
| Neuchâtel Xamax | 2–1 | 2–1 | 1–1 | 1–0 | 4–2 | 3–2 | | 2–2 | 2–1 | 3–4 | 1–1 | 2–1 |
| Servette | 1–1 | 4–1 | 2–0 | 1–1 | 1–1 | 1–0 | 1–2 | | 2–3 | 2–3 | 0–0 | 1–3 |
| Sion | 2–1 | 3–1 | 0–0 | 2–0 | 3–1 | 0–4 | 2–4 | 2–1 | | 1–1 | 1–0 | 0–0 |
| St. Gallen | 0–0 | 1–1 | 0–0 | 2–2 | 3–1 | 3–1 | 2–0 | 1–1 | 2–2 | | 3–0 | 5–1 |
| Wettingen | 1–0 | 2–1 | 1–3 | 0–1 | 1–0 | 3–1 | 0–4 | 2–1 | 0–1 | 0–3 | | 1–1 |
| Young Boys | 0–0 | 2–3 | 2–1 | 0–1 | 3–0 | 5–3 | 0–2 | 3–0 | 1–0 | 1–1 | 0–0 | |

Source: rsssf.com
Legend: Blue = home team win; Yellow = draw; Red = away team win.

=== Championship group ===
The first eight teams of the qualification phase competed in the Championship round. The teams took half of the points (rounded up to complete units) gained in the qualification as bonus with them. The championship group began on 25 February 1990 and was completed on 30 May.

==== Final league table ====
| Pos | Team | Pld | W | D | L | GF | GA | GD | BP | Pts | Qualification |
|---|---|---|---|---|---|---|---|---|---|---|---|
| 1 | Grasshopper Club | 14 | 9 | 0 | 5 | 28 | 15 | +13 | 13 | 31 | Swiss champions, qualified for 1990–91 European Cup and entered 1990 Intertoto Cup |
| 2 | Lausanne-Sport | 14 | 7 | 6 | 1 | 23 | 9 | +14 | 11 | 31 | Qualified for 1990–91 UEFA Cup |
| 3 | Xamax | 14 | 5 | 6 | 3 | 18 | 14 | +4 | 14 | 30 | as Swiss Cup finalist qualified for 1990–91 Cup Winners' Cup and entered 1990 Intertoto Cup |
| 4 | Luzern | 14 | 6 | 4 | 4 | 20 | 22 | −2 | 12 | 28 | Qualified for 1990–91 UEFA Cup and entered 1990 Intertoto Cup |
| 5 | St. Gallen | 14 | 4 | 5 | 5 | 19 | 15 | +4 | 14 | 27 | Entered 1990 Intertoto Cup |
| 6 | Lugano | 14 | 4 | 4 | 6 | 11 | 23 | −12 | 11 | 23 | |
| 7 | Young Boys | 14 | 2 | 6 | 6 | 11 | 20 | −9 | 11 | 21 | |
| 8 | Sion | 14 | 1 | 5 | 8 | 10 | 22 | −12 | 12 | 19 | |

Source: rsssf.com
Rules for classification: 1) points; 2) Position in the qualification.

==== Results ====
| Home \ Away | GCZ | LS | LUG | LUZ | NX | SIO | STG | YB |
|---|---|---|---|---|---|---|---|---|
| Grasshopper | | 1–0 | 3–0 | 5–1 | 5–0 | 4–2 | 2–0 | 1–2 |
| Lausanne-Sport | 2–1 | | 3–0 | 3–0 | 0–0 | 1–1 | 1–0 | 2–0 |
| Lugano | 1–0 | 0–3 | | 4–0 | 0–5 | 1–0 | 1–4 | 1–1 |
| Luzern | 3–0 | 1–1 | 3–1 | | 0–0 | 3–0 | 2–2 | 2–0 |
| Neuchâtel Xamax | 2–1 | 1–3 | 0–0 | 4–0 | | 1–0 | 0–3 | 0–0 |
| Sion | 2–3 | 1–1 | 0–0 | 0–2 | 1–1 | | 0–3 | 1–1 |
| St. Gallen | 0–1 | 1–1 | 0–1 | 1–1 | 1–1 | 0–2 | | 3–1 |
| Young Boys | 0–1 | 2–2 | 1–1 | 1–2 | 0–3 | 1–0 | 1–1 | |

Source: RSSSF
Legend: Blue = home team win; Yellow = draw; Red = away team win.

== Nationalliga B ==
=== Qualification phase ===
The qualification of the NLB began on 21 July 1989 and was completed on 3 December. The top six teams in each group were qualified to play in the two promotion/relegation groups. The bottom six teams in each group then played in newly drawn groups against relegation.

==== Table group East ====
| Pos | Team | Pld | W | D | L | GF | GA | GD | Pts | Qualification |
|---|---|---|---|---|---|---|---|---|---|---|
| 1 | FC Baden | 22 | 14 | 4 | 4 | 46 | 25 | +21 | 32 | Promotion round |
| 2 | FC Zürich | 22 | 13 | 4 | 5 | 45 | 24 | +21 | 30 | Promotion round |
| 3 | FC Winterthur | 22 | 12 | 5 | 5 | 45 | 30 | +15 | 29 | Promotion round |
| 4 | FC Schaffhausen | 22 | 8 | 10 | 4 | 36 | 26 | +10 | 26 | Promotion round |
| 5 | FC Locarno | 22 | 7 | 10 | 5 | 36 | 31 | +5 | 24 | Promotion round |
| 6 | FC Chur | 22 | 7 | 9 | 6 | 28 | 26 | +2 | 23 | Promotion round |
| 7 | FC Chiasso | 22 | 8 | 6 | 8 | 24 | 27 | −3 | 22 | Relegation round |
| 8 | FC Emmenbrücke | 22 | 6 | 6 | 10 | 38 | 40 | −2 | 18 | Relegation round |
| 9 | SC Zug | 22 | 4 | 10 | 8 | 28 | 39 | −11 | 18 | Relegation round |
| 10 | FC Glarus | 22 | 3 | 9 | 10 | 27 | 41 | −14 | 15 | Relegation round |
| 11 | FC Zug | 22 | 4 | 6 | 12 | 23 | 52 | −29 | 14 | Relegation round |
| 12 | FC Brüttisellen | 22 | 5 | 3 | 14 | 33 | 48 | −15 | 13 | Relegation round |

Source: RSSSF
Rules for classification: 1) Points; 2) Goal difference; 3) Goals scored; 4) Head-to-head points; 5) Away goals scored; 6) Draw.

==== Table group West ====
| Pos | Team | Pld | W | D | L | GF | GA | GD | Pts | Qualification |
|---|---|---|---|---|---|---|---|---|---|---|
| 1 | FC Fribourg | 22 | 13 | 5 | 4 | 43 | 38 | +5 | 31 | Promotion round |
| 2 | FC Bulle | 22 | 12 | 6 | 4 | 46 | 23 | +23 | 30 | Promotion round |
| 3 | Yverdon-Sport FC | 22 | 10 | 8 | 4 | 39 | 21 | +18 | 28 | Promotion round |
| 4 | CS Chênois | 22 | 10 | 7 | 5 | 38 | 24 | +14 | 27 | Promotion round |
| 5 | FC Basel | 22 | 11 | 5 | 6 | 40 | 29 | +11 | 27 | Promotion round |
| 6 | FC Grenchen | 22 | 8 | 9 | 5 | 38 | 21 | +17 | 25 | Promotion round |
| 7 | Etoile Carouge FC | 22 | 9 | 4 | 9 | 35 | 35 | 0 | 22 | Relegation round |
| 8 | FC La Chaux-de-Fonds | 22 | 8 | 3 | 11 | 41 | 37 | +4 | 19 | Relegation round |
| 9 | FC Montreux-Sports | 22 | 5 | 8 | 9 | 27 | 38 | −11 | 18 | Relegation round |
| 10 | BSC Old Boys | 22 | 5 | 6 | 11 | 27 | 40 | −13 | 16 | Relegation round |
| 11 | ES Malley | 22 | 3 | 5 | 14 | 18 | 53 | −35 | 11 | Relegation round |
| 12 | FC Martigny-Sports | 22 | 1 | 8 | 13 | 26 | 59 | −33 | 10 | Relegation round |

Source: RSSSF
Rules for classification: 1) Points; 2) Goal difference; 3) Goals scored; 4) Head-to-head points; 5) Away goals scored; 6) Draw.

=== Promotion/relegation round NLA/NLB ===
The promotion/relegation stage began on 24 February 1990 and was completed on 30 May.

==== Table group A ====
| Pos | Team | Pld | W | D | L | GF | GA | GD | Pts | Qualification |
|---|---|---|---|---|---|---|---|---|---|---|
| 1 | Servette | 14 | 8 | 4 | 2 | 29 | 13 | +16 | 20 | Remain in Nationalliga A 1990–91 |
| 2 | Zürich | 14 | 8 | 4 | 2 | 30 | 17 | +13 | 20 | Promoted to Nationalliga A 1990–91 |
| 3 | Basel | 14 | 6 | 5 | 3 | 27 | 17 | +10 | 17 | Remain in NLB 1990–91 |
| 4 | Bellinzona | 14 | 5 | 5 | 4 | 19 | 16 | +3 | 15 | Relegated to NLB 1990–91 |
| 5 | Yverdon-Sports | 14 | 3 | 7 | 4 | 14 | 16 | −2 | 13 | Remain in NLB 1990–91 |
| 6 | Fribourg | 14 | 4 | 3 | 7 | 17 | 27 | −10 | 11 | Remain in NLB 1990–91 |
| 7 | Chur | 14 | 3 | 3 | 8 | 9 | 21 | −12 | 9 | Remain in NLB 1990–91 |
| 8 | Schaffhausen | 14 | 2 | 3 | 9 | 15 | 33 | −18 | 7 | Remain in NLB 1990–91 |

Source: RSSSF
Rules for classification: 1) Points; 2) Goal difference; 3) Goals scored; 4) Head-to-head points; 5) Away goals scored; 6) Draw.

==== Results ====
| Home \ Away | BAS | BEL | CHU | FRI | SHA | SER | YS | ZÜR |
|---|---|---|---|---|---|---|---|---|
| Basel | | 4–1 | 1–0 | 1–1 | 3–1 | 1–1 | 1–1 | 3–3 |
| Bellinzona | 1–4 | | 4–1 | 4–1 | 2–0 | 2–1 | 0–0 | 0–0 |
| Chur | 1–0 | 0–0 | | 1–3 | 1–1 | 0–0 | 1–0 | 1–4 |
| Fribourg | 0–1 | 1–1 | 1–0 | | 2–0 | 3–3 | 3–2 | 0–4 |
| Schaffhausen | 0–5 | 0–2 | 0–1 | 3–0 | | 4–2 | 2–3 | 2–2 |
| Servette | 3–1 | 2–1 | 3–0 | 3–0 | 4–0 | | 1–0 | 4–0 |
| Yverdon-Sport | 1–1 | 1–1 | 2–1 | 1–0 | 2–2 | 0–0 | | 0–0 |
| Zürich | 3–1 | 1–0 | 2–1 | 3–2 | 4–0 | 1–2 | 3–1 | |

Source: RSSSF
Legend: Blue = home team win; Yellow = draw; Red = away team win.

==== Table group B ====
| Pos | Team | Pld | W | D | L | GF | GA | GD | Pts | Qualification |
|---|---|---|---|---|---|---|---|---|---|---|
| 1 | Aarau | 14 | 10 | 2 | 2 | 35 | 10 | +25 | 22 | Remain in Nationalliga A 1990–91 |
| 2 | Wettingen | 14 | 9 | 4 | 1 | 29 | 9 | +20 | 22 | Remain in Nationalliga A 1990–91 |
| 3 | Bulle | 14 | 6 | 5 | 3 | 24 | 18 | +6 | 17 | Remain in NLB 1990–91 |
| 4 | Baden | 14 | 6 | 4 | 4 | 31 | 25 | +6 | 16 | Remain in NLB 1990–91 |
| 5 | Locarno | 14 | 4 | 5 | 5 | 15 | 17 | −2 | 13 | Remain in NLB 1990–91 |
| 6 | Grenchen | 14 | 2 | 5 | 7 | 18 | 28 | −10 | 9 | Remain in NLB 1990–91 |
| 7 | Winterthur | 14 | 2 | 3 | 9 | 15 | 38 | −23 | 7 | Remain in NLB 1990–91 |
| 8 | Chênois | 14 | 1 | 4 | 9 | 12 | 34 | −22 | 6 | Remain in NLB 1990–91 |

Source: RSSSF
Rules for classification: 1) Points; 2) Goal difference; 3) Goals scored; 4) Head-to-head points; 5) Away goals scored; 6) Draw.

==== Results ====
| Home \ Away | AAR | BAD | BUL | CHÊ | GRE | LOC | WET | WIN |
|---|---|---|---|---|---|---|---|---|
| Aarau | | 3–1 | 0–0 | 6–0 | 3–0 | 2–0 | 1–0 | 1–0 |
| Baden | 2–5 | | 1–1 | 1–1 | 4–1 | 0–2 | 1–3 | 4–0 |
| Bulle | 1–3 | 2–5 | | 3–1 | 2–2 | 2–0 | 1–1 | 3–0 |
| Chênois | 0–3 | 2–3 | 0–0 | | 1–1 | 2–1 | 1–2 | 2–3 |
| Grenchen | 2–0 | 1–4 | 1–3 | 1–1 | | 2–3 | 0–1 | 1–1 |
| Locarno | 2–0 | 1–1 | 0–2 | 2–1 | 1–1 | | 0–1 | 0–0 |
| Wettingen | 1–1 | 1–1 | 3–1 | 5–0 | 4–1 | 1–0 | | 5–1 |
| Winterthur | 1–7 | 2–3 | 1–3 | 3–0 | 0–4 | 3–3 | 0–2 | |

Source: RSSSF
Legend: Blue = home team win; Yellow = draw; Red = away team win.

=== Relegation round NLB/1. Liga ===
The last six teams in each of the two qualification phase groups competed in two relegation groups against relegation to the 1. Liga 1990–91. The teams received ranking bonus points from their qualifying groups (7th place 6 pts; 8th place 5 pts; 9th place 4 pts; etc). There was to be one direct relegation in each group, plus a play-out against relegation between both second last placed teams.

==== Table group A ====
| Pos | Team | Pld | W | D | L | GF | GA | GD | BP | Pts | Qualification |
|---|---|---|---|---|---|---|---|---|---|---|---|
| 1 | Etoile Carouge FC | 10 | 5 | 5 | 0 | 19 | 8 | +11 | 6 | 21 | Remain in NLB 1990–91 |
| 2 | FC Glarus | 10 | 2 | 7 | 1 | 11 | 10 | +1 | 3 | 14 | Remain in NLB 1990–91 |
| 3 | FC Emmenbrücke | 10 | 1 | 7 | 2 | 14 | 15 | −1 | 5 | 14 | Remain in NLB 1990–91 |
| 4 | ES FC Malley | 10 | 4 | 2 | 4 | 13 | 16 | −3 | 2 | 12 | Remain in NLB 1990–91 |
| 5 | FC Montreux-Sports | 10 | 2 | 4 | 4 | 14 | 18 | −4 | 4 | 12 | Play-out against relegation |
| 6 | FC Brüttisellen | 10 | 1 | 5 | 4 | 11 | 15 | −4 | 1 | 8 | Relegated to 1990–91 1. Liga |

Source: RSSSF
Rules for classification: 1) Points; 2) Goal difference; 3) Goals scored; 4) Head-to-head points; 5) Away goals scored; 6) Draw.

==== Table group B ====
| Pos | Team | Pld | W | D | L | GF | GA | GD | BP | Pts | Qualification |
|---|---|---|---|---|---|---|---|---|---|---|---|
| 1 | FC La Chaux-de-Fonds | 10 | 5 | 3 | 2 | 18 | 14 | +4 | 5 | 18 | Remain in NLB 1990–91 |
| 2 | FC Chiasso | 10 | 3 | 5 | 2 | 21 | 12 | +9 | 6 | 17 | Remain in NLB 1990–91 |
| 3 | BSC Old Boys | 10 | 2 | 6 | 2 | 14 | 12 | +2 | 3 | 13 | Remain in NLB 1990–91 |
| 4 | SC Zug | 10 | 3 | 3 | 4 | 13 | 19 | −6 | 4 | 13 | Remain in NLB 1990–91 |
| 5 | FC Zug | 10 | 2 | 5 | 3 | 7 | 12 | −5 | 2 | 11 | Play-out against relegation |
| 6 | FC Martigny-Sports | 10 | 1 | 6 | 3 | 17 | 21 | −4 | 1 | 9 | Relegated to 1990–91 1. Liga |

Source: RSSSF
Rules for classification: 1) Points; 2) Goal difference; 3) Goals scored; 4) Head-to-head points; 5) Away goals scored; 6) Draw.

==== Relegation play-out ====
| Team 1 | Score | Team 2 |
|---|---|---|
| FC Zug | 0–2 | FC Montreux-Sports |
| FC Montreux-Sports | 5–1 | FC Zug |

FC Montreux-Sports won 7–1 on aggregate and FC Zug were relegated to 1990–91 1. Liga.

== Attendances ==
| # | Club | Average |
|---|---|---|
| 1 | Luzern | 11,444 |
| 2 | Xamax | 11,200 |
| 3 | St. Gallen | 10,433 |
| 4 | Sion | 8,194 |
| 5 | GCZ | 7,639 |
| 6 | Lausanne | 7,278 |
| 7 | Servette | 6,884 |
| 8 | Young Boys | 6,356 |
| 9 | Lugano | 5,256 |
| 10 | Aarau | 4,261 |
| 11 | Wettingen | 3,369 |
| 12 | Bellinzona | 2,794 |

== Further in Swiss football ==
- 1989–90 Swiss Cup
- 1989–90 Swiss 1. Liga
- 1989 Klötzli incident

== Sources ==
- Switzerland 1989–90 at RSSSF

| Preceded by 1988–89 | Nationalliga seasons in Switzerland | Succeeded by 1990–91 |
