= 1990–91 Nationalliga A =

Swiss football season

Nationalliga A
- Season: 1990–91
- Champions: Grasshopper Club
- Relegated: none
- Top goalscorer: Dario Zuffi, Young Boys, (17 goals)

Nationalliga B
- Season: 1990–91
- Champions: No team was declared champions
- Promoted: none
- Relegated: Chênois; SC Burgdorf; FC Montreux-Sports
- Top goalscorer: n/a

Statistics of the Swiss National League in the 1990–91 football season, both Nationalliga A and Nationalliga B.

== Overview ==
The 36 teams of the Swiss Football League (Nationalliga) were divided into two tiers. In the top-tier, there were 12 teams that played in the Nationalliga A (NLA). There were 24 teams in the Nationalliga B (NLB), the second tier, these were divided into two groups, a West and an East group. Each team in each group played a double round-robin in the qualification phase. Thereafter the divisions were divided into a Swiss championship group with the top eight teams from the qualification and two promotion/relegation groups (NLA/NLB), both with eight teams. These were the bottom four teams from the NLA qualification and the top six teams from both of the NLB qualification groups. Further, there were two relegation groups (NLB/1. Liga), each group with six teams. The last team in each NLB relegation group were to be relegated directly and the two fifth placed teams in each group played a play-out against relegation to decide the third relegation.

== Nationalliga A ==
=== Qualification phase ===
The qualification stage of the NLA began on 25 July 1990 and was completed on 16 December. The top eight teams in the qualification phase would advance to the championship group and the last four teams would play against relegation.

==== Table ====
Pos	Team	Pld	W	D	L	GF	GA	GD	Pts	Qualification
1	Sion	22	10	10	2	31	20	+11	30	Advance to championship round halved points (rounded up) as bonus
2	Grasshopper Club	22	9	9	4	29	17	+12	27	Advance to championship round halved points (rounded up) as bonus
3	Xamax	22	8	10	4	25	15	+10	26	Advance to championship round halved points (rounded up) as bonus
4	Lausanne-Sport	22	9	8	5	39	30	+9	26	Advance to championship round halved points (rounded up) as bonus
5	Lugano	22	8	9	5	27	22	+5	25	Advance to championship round halved points (rounded up) as bonus
6	Servette	22	9	6	7	30	27	+3	24	Advance to championship round halved points (rounded up) as bonus
7	Young Boys	22	6	11	5	35	26	+9	23	Advance to championship round halved points (rounded up) as bonus
8	Luzern	22	8	7	7	30	28	+2	23	Advance to championship round halved points (rounded up) as bonus
9	St. Gallen	22	7	8	7	26	26	0	22	Continue to promotion/relegation round
10	Aarau	22	3	9	10	19	30	−11	15	Continue to promotion/relegation round
11	Zürich	22	3	6	13	21	45	−24	12	Continue to promotion/relegation round
12	Wettingen	22	3	5	14	24	50	−26	11	Continue to promotion/relegation round

Source: rsssf.com
Rules for classification: 1) Points; 2) Goal difference; 3) Goals scored; 4) Head-to-head points; 5) Away goals scored; 6) Draw.

==== Results ====
Home \ Away	AAR	GCZ	LS	LUG	LUZ	NX	SER	SIO	STG	WET	YB	ZÜR
Aarau		0–2	0–1	1–1	2–2	1–3	1–1	0–0	1–1	1–0	2–1	2–1
Grasshopper Club	0–0		1–1	2–0	0–0	1–0	1–1	2–2	2–0	2–2	0–0	1–2
Lausanne-Sport	1–0	0–0		3–0	3–3	1–0	2–0	3–4	3–1	4–0	1–4	4–2
Lugano	0–0	3–1	3–2		1–2	3–0	0–0	0–0	0–0	3–1	0–0	3–0
Luzern	2–0	0–2	2–2	0–1		0–1	1–3	0–0	3–1	0–0	3–2	5–1
Neuchâtel Xamax	2–0	0–0	5–1	1–1	1–1		0–0	1–1	1–0	2–0	0–0	0–1
Servette	1–0	1–3	0–3	0–1	2–3	0–0		2–1	0–2	1–0	3–0	3–2
Sion	2–1	2–1	2–1	3–0	1–0	2–2	2–1		1–1	3–2	2–0	1–0
St. Gallen	2–1	0–3	1–1	3–0	0–1	1–1	1–4	2–1		2–0	1–1	3–0
Wettingen	4–3	0–3	1–1	0–4	1–2	0–3	1–3	0–0	1–3		4–0	2–2
Young Boys	2–2	2–0	1–1	2–2	3–0	1–1	2–2	0–0	0–0	6–1		5–1
Zürich	1–1	1–2	0–0	1–1	1–0	0–1	1–2	1–1	1–1	2–4	0–3	

Source: rsssf.com
Legend: Blue = home team win; Yellow = draw; Red = away team win.

=== Championship group ===
The first eight teams of the qualification phase competed in the Championship round. The teams took half of the points (rounded up to complete units) gained in the qualification as bonus with them. The championship group began on 3 March 1991 and was completed on 12 June.

==== Table ====
Pos	Team	Pld	W	D	L	GF	GA	GD	BP	Pts	Qualification
1	Grasshopper Club	14	7	5	2	27	15	+12	14	33	Swiss champions, qualified for 1991–92 European Cup and entered 1991 Intertoto Cup
2	Sion	14	3	8	3	14	15	−1	15	29	Swiss Cup winners, qualified for 1991–92 Cup Winners' Cup
3	Xamax	14	5	6	3	16	13	+3	13	29	Qualified for 1991–92 UEFA Cup and entered 1991 Intertoto Cup
4	Lausanne-Sport	14	5	6	3	15	13	+2	13	29	Qualified for 1991–92 UEFA Cup and entered 1991 Intertoto Cup
5	Lugano	14	5	4	5	16	15	+1	13	27	Entered 1991 Intertoto Cup
6	Young Boys	14	3	6	5	21	26	−5	12	24	
7	Servette	14	1	9	4	16	24	−8	12	23	
8	Luzern	14	3	4	7	16	20	−4	12	22	

Source: rsssf.com
Rules for classification: 1) points; 2) Position in the qualification.

==== Results ====
Home \ Away	GCZ	LS	LUG	LUZ	NX	SER	SIO	YB
Grasshopper Club		0–1	2–0	3–2	1–1	1–1	3–2	2–2
Lausanne-Sport	0–0		2–0	3–1	1–1	1–3	1–1	1–3
Lugano	3–3	0–1		1–0	2–1	1–1	1–1	4–0
Luzern	0–3	0–1	0–1		1–1	0–0	2–0	1–1
Neuchâtel Xamax	0–2	1–1	1–0	2–0		1–0	1–1	2–1
Servette	1–5	1–1	2–2	1–1	1–4		0–0	2–4
Sion	1–0	1–0	1–0	2–3	0–0	1–1		1–1
Young Boys	1–2	1–1	0–1	1–5	2–0	2–2	2–2	

Source: rsssf.com
Legend: Blue = home team win; Yellow = draw; Red = away team win.

== Nationalliga B ==
=== Qualification phase ===
The qualification of the NLB began on 25 July 1990 and was completed on 22 December. The top six teams in each group were qualified to play in the two promotion/relegation groups. The bottom six teams in each group then played in the newly drawn groups against relegation.

==== Table group East ====
Pos	Team	Pld	W	D	L	GF	GA	GD	Pts	Qualification
1	Locarno	22	13	6	3	44	23	+21	32	Promotion round
2	Baden	22	13	5	4	41	19	+22	31	Promotion round
3	FC Schaffhausen	22	12	4	6	45	29	+16	28	Promotion round
4	Basel	22	9	8	5	40	30	+10	26	Promotion round
5	SC Zug	22	8	10	4	29	22	+7	26	Promotion round
6	Chiasso	22	10	5	7	43	26	+17	25	Promotion round
7	Bellinzona	22	7	6	9	34	32	+2	20	Relegation group
8	Winterthur	22	7	6	9	26	35	−9	20	Relegation group
9	Chur	22	5	7	10	20	25	−5	17	Relegation group
10	FC Glarus	22	4	6	12	23	58	−35	14	Relegation group
11	Emmenbrücke	22	3	7	12	18	39	−21	13	Relegation group
12	Kriens	22	4	4	14	22	47	−25	12	Relegation group

Source: rsssf.com
Rules for classification: 1) Points; 2) Goal difference; 3) Goals scored; 4) Head-to-head points; 5) Away goals scored; 6) Draw.

==== Table group West ====
Pos	Team	Pld	W	D	L	GF	GA	GD	Pts	Qualification
1	Yverdon-Sport	22	14	6	2	49	21	+28	34	Promotion round
2	BSC Old Boys	22	12	6	4	56	38	+18	30	Promotion round
3	Etoile Carouge	22	11	7	4	38	31	+7	29	Promotion round
4	La Chaux-de-Fonds	22	9	9	4	52	37	+15	27	Promotion round
5	Fribourg	22	8	8	6	54	36	+18	24	Promotion round
6	Urania Genève Sport	22	9	6	7	45	33	+12	24	Promotion round
7	Grenchen	22	9	5	8	42	27	+15	23	Relegation group
8	Bulle	22	7	6	9	31	35	−4	20	Relegation group
9	ES Malley	22	3	12	7	22	33	−11	18	Relegation group
10	Montreux-Sports	22	4	7	11	27	47	−20	15	Relegation group
11	Chênois	22	2	7	13	19	53	−34	11	Relegation group
12	SC Burgdorf	22	1	7	14	9	53	−44	9	Relegation group

Source: rsssf.com
Rules for classification: 1) Points; 2) Goal difference; 3) Goals scored; 4) Head-to-head points; 5) Away goals scored; 6) Draw.

=== Promotion/relegation round NLA/NLB ===
The promotion/relegation stage began on 2 March 1991 and was completed on 12 June.

==== Table group A ====
Pos	Team	Pld	W	D	L	GF	GA	GD	Pts	Qualification
1	St. Gallen	14	10	2	2	33	11	+22	22	Remain in NLA 1991–92
2	Wettingen	14	9	2	3	25	15	+10	20	Remain in NLA 1991–92
3	Chiasso	14	6	4	4	19	21	−2	16	Remain in NLB 1991–92
4	Basel	14	4	4	6	18	17	+1	12	Remain in NLB 1991–92
5	Yverdon-Sports	14	5	2	7	21	22	−1	12	Remain in NLB 1991–92
6	Fribourg	14	4	3	7	18	25	−7	11	Remain in NLB 1991–92
7	Baden	14	4	3	7	19	26	−7	11	Remain in NLB 1991–92
8	Etoile Carouge	14	4	0	10	16	32	−16	8	Remain in NLB 1991–92

Source: rsssf.com
Rules for classification: 1) Points; 2) Goal difference; 3) Goals scored; 4) Head-to-head points; 5) Away goals scored; 6) Draw.

==== Results ====
Home \ Away	BAD	BAS	CHI	ÉTO	FRI	STG	WET	YS
Baden		1–1	1–1	2–0	2–2	0–1	1–3	2–1
Basel	1–4		3–0	3–1	0–0	0–1	1–2	3–0
Chiasso	3–2	0–0		1–0	2–0	0–3	1–5	2–0
Étoile Carouge	2–1	2–1	2–3		3–2	1–5	0–1	0–5
Fribourg	0–1	2–2	1–3	2–1		1–2	2–0	2–0
St. Gallen	2–0	1–0	1–1	2–3	6–1		3–0	1–1
Wettingen	5–1	1–3	1–1	1–0	2–0	2–1		1–0
Yverdon-Sport	4–1	2–0	2–1	3–1	1–3	1–4	1–1	

Source: rsssf.com
Legend: Blue = home team win; Yellow = draw; Red = away team win.

==== Table group B ====
Pos	Team	Pld	W	D	L	GF	GA	GD	Pts	Qualification
1	Zürich	14	7	7	0	28	10	+18	21	Remain in NLA 1991–92
2	Aarau	14	7	6	1	28	12	+16	20	Remain in NLA 1991–92
3	FC Schaffhausen	14	8	2	4	19	12	+7	18	Remain in NLB 1991–92
4	Locarno	14	6	5	3	18	13	+5	17	Remain in NLB 1991–92
5	La Chaux-de-Fonds	14	5	2	7	27	26	+1	12	Remain in NLB 1991–92
6	Urania Genève Sport	14	2	7	5	16	27	−11	11	Remain in NLB 1991–92
7	SC Zug	14	2	3	9	14	29	−15	7	Remain in NLB 1991–92
8	BSC Old Boys	14	2	2	10	11	32	−21	6	Remain in NLB 1991–92

Source: rsssf.com
Rules for classification: 1) Points; 2) Goal difference; 3) Goals scored; 4) Head-to-head points; 5) Away goals scored; 6) Draw.

==== Results ====
Home \ Away	AAR	CDF	LOC	OBB	SHA	URA	ZUG	ZÜR
Aarau		3–1	1–2	4–0	2–1	2–2	2–0	2–2
La Chaux-de-Fonds	0–0		5–1	0–3	2–3	6–0	5–2	0–4
Locarno	0–0	1–1		1–0	1–0	1–1	3–0	0–0
Old Boys	2–6	2–3	0–4		0–1	2–1	0–3	2–2
FC Schaffhausen	0–1	1–0	1–0	3–0		4–1	2–1	0–0
Urania Genève Sport	1–1	2–0	1–1	2–0	1–1		1–1	0–2
SC Zug	1–4	2–3	0–2	2–0	1–2	0–0		1–1
Zürich	0–0	2–1	3–1	0–0	2–0	6–3	4–0	

Source: rsssf.com
Legend: Blue = home team win; Yellow = draw; Red = away team win.

=== Relegation round NLB/1. Liga ===
The last six teams in each of the two qualification phase groups competed in two relegation groups against relegation to the 1. Liga 1991–92. The teams received ranking bonus points from their qualifying groups (7th place 6 pts; 8th place 5 pts; 9th place 4 pts; etc). There was to be one direct relegation in each group, plus a play-out against relegation between both second last placed teams. The relegation stage began on 17 March 1991 and was completed on 25 May.

==== Table group A ====
Pos	Team	Pld	W	D	L	GF	GA	GD	BP	Pts	Qualification
1	Winterthur	10	5	4	1	14	6	+8	5	19	Remain in NLB 1991–92
2	Grenchen	10	5	2	3	16	14	+2	6	18	Remain in NLB 1991–92
3	Kriens	10	6	1	3	17	13	+4	1	14	Remain in NLB 1991–92
4	ES Malley	10	3	2	5	8	10	−2	4	12	Remain in NLB 1991–92
5	FC Glarus	10	2	4	4	13	17	−4	3	11	Play-out against relegation
6	Chênois	10	1	3	6	10	18	−8	2	7	Relegated to 1991–92 1. Liga

Source: rsssf.com
Rules for classification: 1) Points; 2) Goal difference; 3) Goals scored; 4) Head-to-head points; 5) Away goals scored; 6) Draw.

==== Table group B ====
Pos	Team	Pld	W	D	L	GF	GA	GD	BP	Pts	Qualification
1	Bulle	10	6	3	1	26	7	+19	5	20	Remain in NLB 1991–92
2	Bellinzona	10	3	4	3	14	15	−1	6	16	Remain in NLB 1991–92
3	FC Chur	10	3	5	2	10	7	+3	4	15	Remain in NLB 1991–92
4	Emmenbrücke	10	4	1	5	13	15	−2	2	11	Remain in NLB 1991–92
5	Montreux-Sports	10	1	5	4	4	16	−12	3	10	Play-out against relegation
6	SC Burgdorf	10	1	6	3	8	15	−7	1	9	Relegated to 1991–92 1. Liga

Source: rsssf.com
Rules for classification: 1) Points; 2) Goal difference; 3) Goals scored; 4) Head-to-head points; 5) Away goals scored; 6) Draw.

==== Relegation play-out ====
The two legged play-out against relegation between both second last placed teams was played on 1 and 8 June 1991.

Team 1	Score	Team 2
FC Glarus	2–1	Montreux-Sports
Montreux-Sports	3–1	FC Glarus

Montreux-Sports won 4–3 on aggregate. Glarus were originally relegated, however, because Montreux-Sports had their license revoked, Glarus remained in NLB 1991–92 and Montreux-Sports were demoted to the 1991–92 1. Liga.

== Attendances ==
#	Club	Average
1	Sion	9,678
2	Luzern	9,167
3	Lausanne	9,150
4	Xamax	9,061
5	GCZ	6,694
6	St. Gallen	6,556
7	Servette	6,017
8	Young Boys	5,544
9	Zürich	5,089
10	Lugano	3,767
11	Aarau	3,531
12	Wettingen	3,072

== Further in Swiss football ==
- 1990–91 Swiss Cup
- 1990–91 Swiss 1. Liga

== Sources ==
- Switzerland 1990–91 at RSSSF

Preceded by 1989–90	Nationalliga seasons in Switzerland	Succeeded by 1991–92
