= 1990–91 Swiss 1. Liga =

1. Liga
- Season: 1990–91
- Champions: Group 1: Martigny-Sports; Group 2: Colombier; Group 3: Solothurn; Group 4: Brüttisellen
- Promoted: Châtel-Saint-Denis; Delémont; Brüttisellen
- Relegated: Group 1: Vevey Sports; Jorat-Mezieres; Group 2: Le Locle; Breitenbach; Group 3: Beauregard Fribourg; Brugg; Nordstern; Group 4: Einsiedeln; Kilchberg
- Matches: 4 times 182 and 4 deciders plus 13 play-offs and 4 play-outs

The 1990–91 Swiss 1. Liga was the 59th season of this league since its creation in 1931. At this time, the 1. Liga was the third tier of the Swiss football league system and it was the highest level of amateur football.

== Format ==
There were 56 clubs in the 1. Liga, divided into four regional groups, each with 14 teams. Within each group, the teams would play a double round-robin to decide their league position. Two points were awarded for a win. The four group winners and the four runners-up then contested a play-off for the three promotion slots. The two last placed teams in each group were directly relegated to the 2. Liga (fourth tier). The four third-last placed teams would compete a play-out against the ninth relegation spot.

== Group 1 ==
=== Teams ===
Club	Canton	Stadium	Capacity
FC Aigle	Vaud	Les Glariers	1,000
FC Châtel-Saint-Denis	Fribourg	Stade du Lussy - Châtel-St-Denis	1,000
FC Collex-Bossy	Geneva	Stade Marc Burdet	1,000
Concordia/Folgore Lausanne	Vaud	Centre Sportif de la Tuilière	1,000
FC Echallens	Vaud	Sportplatz 3 Sapins	2,000
FC Fully	Valais	Stade de Charnot	1,000
FC Jorat-Mezieres	Vaud	En Pré l'Etang	1,000
FC Martigny-Sports	Valais	Stade d'Octodure	2,500
FC Monthey	Valais	Stade Philippe Pottier	1,800
FC Raron	Valais	Sportplatz Rhoneglut	1,000
FC Renens	Waadt	Zone sportive du Censuy	2,300
FC Savièse	Valais	Stade St-Germain	2,000
FC Versoix	Geneva	Centre sportif de la Bécassière	1,000
Vevey Sports	Vaud	Stade de Copet	4,000

=== Final league table ===
Pos	Team	Pld	W	D	L	GF	GA	GD	Pts	Qualification or relegation
1	FC Martigny-Sports	26	16	5	5	66	39	+27	37	Play-off to Nationalliga B
2	FC Châtel-Saint-Denis	26	15	6	5	53	24	+29	36	To decider for second place
3	FC Monthey	26	14	8	4	57	26	+31	36	To decider for second place
4	FC Savièse	26	12	7	7	51	41	+10	31	
5	FC Fully	26	10	8	8	49	43	+6	28	
6	FC Echallens	26	10	5	11	44	49	−5	25	
7	FC Versoix	26	9	7	10	43	57	−14	25	
8	FC Collex-Bossy	26	9	6	11	41	39	+2	24	
9	FC Renens	26	7	10	9	40	40	0	24	
10	FC Aigle	26	9	6	11	45	51	−6	24	
11	FC Raron	26	7	9	10	32	39	−7	23	
12	Concordia/Folgore Lausanne	26	7	7	12	40	53	−13	21	Decider for twelfth place
13	Vevey Sports	26	7	7	12	45	47	−2	21	Decider for twelfth place
14	FC Jorat-Mezieres	26	3	3	20	26	84	−58	9	Relegation to 2. Liga Interregional

Source: RSSSF
Rules for classification: 1) Points; 2) Goal difference within the league, but decider play-off for qualifiers.

=== Decider for second place ===
The decider was played on 21 May in Montreux

Team 1	Score	Team 2
FC Monthey	0–1	FC Châtel-Saint-Denis

FC Châtel-Saint-Denis win and advance to play-offs.

=== Decider for twelfth place ===
The decider was played on 21 May in Renens

Team 1	Score	Team 2
Concordia/Folgore Lausanne	1–0	Vevey Sports

Concordia/Folgore Lausanne win and advance to play-outs. Vevey Sports are relegation to 2. Liga Interregional

== Group 2 ==
=== Teams ===
Club	Canton	Stadium	Capacity
FC Bern	Bern	Stadion Neufeld	14,000
FC Beauregard Fribourg	Fribourg	Guintzet	2,000
FC Breitenbach	Solothurn	Grien	2,000
SC Bümpliz 78	Bern	Bodenweid	4,000
FC Colombier	Neuchâtel	Stade des Chézards	2,500
SR Delémont	Jura	La Blancherie	5,263
FC Domdidier	Fribourg	Terrains de football, Domdidier	1,000
FC Laufen	Basel-Country	Sportplatz Nau	3,000
FC Lerchenfeld	canton of Bern	Sportanlagen Waldeck	2,400
FC Le Locle	Neuchâtel	Installation sportive - Jeanneret	3,142
SV Lyss	Bern	Sportzentrum Grien	2,000
FC Moutier	Bern	Stade de Chalière	5,000
FC Münsingen	Bern	Sportanlage Sandreutenen	1,400
FC Thun	Bern	Stadion Lachen	10,350

=== Final league table ===
Pos	Team	Pld	W	D	L	GF	GA	GD	Pts	Qualification or relegation
1	FC Colombier	26	17	6	3	63	23	+40	40	Play-off to Nationalliga B
2	SR Delémont	26	18	3	5	68	26	+42	39	Play-off to Nationalliga B
3	FC Münsingen	26	12	5	9	40	30	+10	29	
4	FC Laufen	26	10	9	7	41	36	+5	29	
5	SV Lyss	26	9	10	7	49	42	+7	28	
6	SC Bümpliz 78]	26	11	6	9	45	40	+5	28	
7	FC Lerchenfeld	26	7	13	6	43	38	+5	27	
8	FC Moutier	26	9	6	11	44	50	−6	24	
9	FC Domdidier	26	9	6	11	40	53	−13	24	
10	FC Bern	26	8	7	11	35	34	+1	23	
11	FC Thun	26	9	5	12	44	55	−11	23	
12	FC Beauregard Fribourg	26	9	5	12	40	50	−10	23	Play-out against relegation
13	FC Le Locle	26	7	6	13	37	44	−7	20	Relegation to 2. Liga Interregional
14	FC Breitenbach	26	2	3	21	27	95	−68	7	Relegation to 2. Liga Interregional

Source: RSSSF
Rules for classification: 1) Points; 2) Goal difference within the league, but decider play-off for qualifiers.

== Group 3 ==
=== Teams ===
Club	Canton	Stadium	Capacity
FC Altstetten (Zürich)	Zürich	Buchlern	1,000
FC Ascona	Ticino	Stadio Comunale Ascona	1,400
FC Brugg	Aargau	Stadion Au	3,300
SC Buochs	Nidwalden	Stadion Seefeld	5,000
FC Klus-Balsthal	Solothurn	Sportplatz Moos	4,000
FC Mendrisio	Ticino	Centro Sportivo Comunale	4,000
FC Nordstern Basel	Basel-Stadt	Rankhof	7,600
FC Pratteln	Basel-Country	In den Sandgruben	5,000
FC Riehen	Basel-City	Sportplatz Grendelmatte	2,500
FC Solothurn	Solothurn	Stadion FC Solothurn	6,750
FC Suhr	Aargau	Hofstattmatten	2,000
FC Sursee	Lucerne	Stadion Schlottermilch	3,500
FC Tresa/Monteggio	Ticino	Centro Sportivo Passera	1,280
FC Zug	Zug	Herti Allmend Stadion	6,000

=== Final league table ===
Pos	Team	Pld	W	D	L	GF	GA	GD	Pts	Qualification or relegation
1	FC Solothurn	26	14	8	4	48	23	+25	36	Play-off to Nationalliga B
2	FC Pratteln	26	12	10	4	39	23	+16	34	To decider for second place
3	SC Buochs	26	13	8	5	32	17	+15	34	To decider for second place
4	FC Riehen	26	13	7	6	36	22	+14	33	
5	FC Mendrisio	26	11	7	8	45	35	+10	29	
6	FC Klus-Balsthal	26	10	7	9	32	34	−2	27	
7	FC Sursee	26	8	10	8	25	23	+2	26	
8	FC Ascona	26	8	10	8	30	30	0	26	
9	FC Altstetten (Zürich)	26	9	8	9	28	35	−7	26	
10	FC Tresa/Monteggio	26	8	7	11	39	45	−6	23	
11	FC Zug	26	5	13	8	25	29	−4	23	
12	FC Suhr	26	5	9	12	32	42	−10	19	Play-out against relegation
13	FC Brugg	26	2	10	14	16	39	−23	14	Relegation to 2. Liga Interregional
14	FC Nordstern Basel	26	5	4	17	30	60	−30	14	Relegation to 2. Liga Interregional

Source: RSSSF
Rules for classification: 1) Points; 2) Goal difference within the league, but decider play-off for qualifiers.

=== Decider for second place ===
The decider was played on 21 May 1991 at the Stadion Schlottermilch in Sursee

Team 1	Score	Team 2
SC Buochs	0–3	FC Pratteln

FC Pratteln win and advance to play-offs.

== Group 4 ==
=== Teams ===
Club	Canton	Stadium	Capacity
FC Altstätten (St. Gallen)	St. Gallen	Grüntal Altstätten	1,000
FC Balzers	Liechtenstein	Sportplatz Rheinau	2,000
SC Brühl	St. Gallen	Paul-Grüninger-Stadion	4,200
FC Brüttisellen	Zürich	Lindenbuck	1,000
FC Einsiedeln	Schwyz	Rappenmöösli	1,300
FC Frauenfeld	Thurgau	Kleine Allmend	6,370
FC Herisau	Appenzell Ausserrhoden	Ebnet	2,000
FC Kilchberg	Zürich	Hochweid	1,000
FC Kreuzlingen	Thurgau	Sportplatz Hafenareal	1,200
FC Red Star Zürich	Zürich	Allmend Brunau	2,000
FC Rorschach	Schwyz	Sportplatz Kellen	1,000
FC Tuggen	Schwyz	Linthstrasse	2,800
SC Veltheim	Aargau	Sportanlage Flüeli	2,000
FC Young Fellows Zürich	Zürich	Utogrund	2,850

=== Final league table ===
Pos	Team	Pld	W	D	L	GF	GA	GD	Pts	Qualification or relegation
1	FC Brüttisellen	26	17	6	3	55	18	+37	40	Play-off to Nationalliga B
2	SC Brühl	26	15	10	1	39	14	+25	40	Play-off to Nationalliga B
3	FC Young Fellows Zürich	26	10	12	4	43	29	+14	32	
4	FC Rorschach	26	10	12	4	40	33	+7	32	
5	FC Red Star Zürich	26	11	8	7	33	29	+4	30	
6	FC Tuggen	26	10	8	8	48	39	+9	28	
7	FC Herisau	26	10	8	8	42	36	+6	28	
8	FC Frauenfeld	26	10	8	8	30	29	+1	28	
9	FC Kreuzlingen	26	8	5	13	35	53	−18	21	
10	FC Altstätten (St. Gallen)	26	6	8	12	26	38	−12	20	
11	FC Balzers	26	7	6	13	33	48	−15	20	
12	SC Veltheim	26	6	6	14	27	45	−18	18	Decider for twelfth place
13	FC Einsiedeln	26	6	6	14	35	43	−8	18	Decider for twelfth place
14	FC Kilchberg	26	3	3	20	20	52	−32	9	Relegation to 2. Liga Interregional

Source: RSSSF
Rules for classification: 1) Points; 2) Goal difference within the league, but decider play-off for qualifiers.

=== Decider for twelfth place ===
The decider was played on 21 May in Altstetten (Zürich)

Team 1	Score	Team 2
FC Einsiedeln	1–2	SC Veltheim

SC Veltheim win and advance to play-outs. FC Einsiedeln are relegation to 2. Liga Interregional

== Promotion play-off ==
=== Qualification round ===
Team 1	Score	Team 2
FC Pratteln	2–0	FC Brüttisellen
FC Brüttisellen	3–0	FC Pratteln

FC Brüttisellen win 3–2 on aggregate and continue to the finals.

Team 1	Score	Team 2
SC Brühl	0–0	FC Solothurn
FC Solothurn	0–1	SC Brühl

SC Brühl win 1–0 on aggregate and continue to the finals.

Team 1	Score	Team 2
SR Delémont	5–0	FC Martigny-Sports
FC Martigny-Sports	2–3	SR Delémont

SR Delémont win 8–2 on aggregate and continue to the finals.

Team 1	Score	Team 2
FC Châtel-Saint-Denis	3–1	FC Colombier
FC Colombier	1–2	FC Châtel-Saint-Denis

FC Châtel-Saint-Denis win 5–2 on aggregate and continue to the finals.

=== Final round ===
Team 1	Score	Team 2
SC Brühl	0–1	FC Châtel-Saint-Denis
FC Châtel-Saint-Denis	1–1	SC Brühl

FC Châtel-Saint-Denis win 2–1 on aggregate and are promoted to 1991–92 Nationalliga B.

Team 1	Score	Team 2
FC Brüttisellen	1–5	SR Delémont
SR Delémont	3–0	FC Brüttisellen

SR Delémont win 8–1 on aggregate and are promoted to 1991–92 Nationalliga B.

=== Play-off for third place ===
Team 1	Score	Team 2
FC Brüttisellen	0–0 a.e.t. 5–3 pen.	SC Brühl

FC Brüttisellen win after penalty shoot-out and are promoted to 1991–92 Nationalliga B.

== Relegation play-out ==
=== First round ===
Team 1	Score	Team 2
Concordia/Folgore Lausanne	2–2 a.e.t. 3–1 pen.	FC Beauregard Fribourg

Concordia/Folgore Lausanne win after penalty shoot-out. FC Beauregard Fribourg continue to the final.

Team 1	Score	Team 2
SC Veltheim	1–1 a.e.t. 0–3 pen.	FC Suhr

FC Suhr win after penalty shoot-out. SC Veltheim continue to the final.

=== Final round ===
Team 1	Score	Team 2
FC Beauregard Fribourg	2–2	SC Veltheim
SC Veltheim	2–1	FC Beauregard Fribourg

SC Veltheim win 4–3 on aggregate. FC Beauregard Fribourg are relegated to 2. Liga.

== Further in Swiss football ==
- 1990–91 Nationalliga A
- 1990–91 Nationalliga B
- 1990–91 Swiss Cup

== Sources ==
- Switzerland 1990–91 at RSSSF

Preceded by 1989–90	Seasons in Swiss 1. Liga	Succeeded by 1991–92
