= 1990 Intertoto Cup =

Tournament details
- Dates: Summer 1990
- Teams: 44

Tournament statistics
- Matches played: 132

In the 1990 Intertoto Cup no knock-out rounds were contested, and therefore no winner was declared.

== Teams ==
- (Austria) Sturm Graz
- (Austria) Tirol Innsbruck
- (Austria) Vienna
- (Austria) Admira Wacker Wien
- (Bulgaria) Pirin Blagoevgrad
- (Bulgaria) Slavia Sofia
- (Czechoslovakia) Slovan Bratislava
- (Czechoslovakia) Sparta Prague
- (Czechoslovakia) Bohemians Prague
- (Czechoslovakia) Plastika Nitra
- (Denmark) Lyngby BK
- (Denmark) Vejle BK
- (Denmark) Brøndby
- (Denmark) AGF Aarhus
- (Denmark) OB
- (East Germany) Energie Cottbus
- (East Germany) Hansa Rostock
- (East Germany) Chemnitz
- (East Germany) FC Berlin
- (West Germany) Bochum
- (West Germany) Bayer Uerdingen
- (West Germany) Kaiserslautern
- (West Germany) Karlsruhe
- (West Germany) Fortuna Düsseldorf
- (Hungary) Siófok
- (Hungary) MTK Budapest
- (Hungary) Tatabánya
- (Hungary) Vasas
- (Israel) Maccabi Haifa
- (Israel) Bnei Yehuda
- (Poland) Lech Poznań
- (Romania) Petrolul Ploiești
- (Romania) Sportul București
- (Sweden) Malmö FF
- (Sweden) GAIS
- (Sweden) IFK Norrköping
- (Sweden) Örebro
- (Sweden) Gefle IF
- (Switzerland) Neuchâtel Xamax
- (Switzerland) St. Gallen
- (Switzerland) FC Luzern
- (Switzerland) Grasshopper Club
- (Socialist Federal Republic of Yugoslavia) Olimpija Ljubljana
- (Socialist Federal Republic of Yugoslavia) Osijek

== Group stage ==
The teams were divided into 11 groups of 4 teams each.

=== Group 1 ===
| Pos | Team | Pld | W | D | L | GF | GA | GD | Pts | NEU | SPA | LYN | ADM |
|---|---|---|---|---|---|---|---|---|---|---|---|---|---|
| 1 | (Switzerland) Neuchâtel Xamax | 6 | 5 | 0 | 1 | 9 | 2 | +7 | 10 | — | 0–1 | 2–0 | 1–0 |
| 2 | (Czechoslovakia) Sparta Prague | 6 | 4 | 1 | 1 | 13 | 9 | +4 | 9 | 0–3 | — | 1–0 | 4–1 |
| 3 | (Denmark) Lyngby BK | 6 | 2 | 0 | 4 | 9 | 12 | −3 | 4 | 1–2 | 2–4 | — | 4–2 |
| 4 | (Austria) Admira Wacker Wien | 6 | 0 | 1 | 5 | 7 | 15 | −8 | 1 | 0–1 | 3–3 | 1–2 | — |

Source: Pawel Mogielnicki's Page 1990
Rules for classification: 1) Points; 2) Goal difference; 3) Goals scored; 4) Head-to-head points; 5) Away goals scored; 6) Draw.

=== Group 2 ===
| Pos | Team | Pld | W | D | L | GF | GA | GD | Pts | TIN | BOC | STG | SLS |
|---|---|---|---|---|---|---|---|---|---|---|---|---|---|
| 1 | (Austria) Tirol Innsbruck | 6 | 4 | 1 | 1 | 12 | 6 | +6 | 9 | — | 1–0 | 1–1 | 4–1 |
| 2 | (West Germany) Bochum | 6 | 3 | 1 | 2 | 8 | 6 | +2 | 7 | 2–3 | — | 2–1 | 1–0 |
| 3 | (Switzerland) St. Gallen | 6 | 3 | 1 | 2 | 8 | 7 | +1 | 7 | 2–1 | 0–2 | — | 2–1 |
| 4 | (Bulgaria) Slavia Sofia | 6 | 0 | 1 | 5 | 3 | 12 | −9 | 1 | 0–2 | 1–1 | 0–2 | — |

Source: Pawel Mogielnicki's Page 1990
Rules for classification: 1) Points; 2) Goal difference; 3) Goals scored; 4) Head-to-head points; 5) Away goals scored; 6) Draw.

=== Group 3 ===
| Pos | Team | Pld | W | D | L | GF | GA | GD | Pts | LPO | MHA | SIÓ | BNY |
|---|---|---|---|---|---|---|---|---|---|---|---|---|---|
| 1 | (Poland) Lech Poznań | 6 | 5 | 0 | 1 | 15 | 7 | +8 | 10 | — | 1–0 | 3–1 | 3–0 |
| 2 | (Israel) Maccabi Haifa | 6 | 3 | 2 | 1 | 14 | 5 | +9 | 8 | 4–2 | — | 3–0 | 2–2 |
| 3 | (Hungary) Siófok | 6 | 2 | 1 | 3 | 5 | 9 | −4 | 5 | 0–2 | 0–0 | — | 3–1 |
| 4 | (Israel) Bnei Yehuda | 6 | 0 | 1 | 5 | 5 | 18 | −13 | 1 | 2–4 | 0–5 | 0–1 | — |

Source: Pawel Mogielnicki's Page 1990
Rules for classification: 1) Points; 2) Goal difference; 3) Goals scored; 4) Head-to-head points; 5) Away goals scored; 6) Draw.

=== Group 4 ===
| Pos | Team | Pld | W | D | L | GF | GA | GD | Pts | SLO | VEJ | NOR | MTK |
|---|---|---|---|---|---|---|---|---|---|---|---|---|---|
| 1 | (Czechoslovakia) Slovan Bratislava | 6 | 4 | 1 | 1 | 17 | 3 | +14 | 9 | — | 5–1 | 7–0 | 2–0 |
| 2 | (Denmark) Vejle BK | 6 | 4 | 1 | 1 | 11 | 9 | +2 | 9 | 1–0 | — | 2–2 | 4–1 |
| 3 | (Sweden) IFK Norrköping | 6 | 1 | 2 | 3 | 9 | 16 | −7 | 4 | 1–1 | 1–2 | — | 2–0 |
| 4 | (Hungary) MTK Budapest | 6 | 1 | 0 | 5 | 5 | 14 | −9 | 2 | 0–2 | 0–1 | 4–3 | — |

Source: Pawel Mogielnicki's Page 1990
Rules for classification: 1) Points; 2) Goal difference; 3) Goals scored; 4) Head-to-head points; 5) Away goals scored; 6) Draw.

=== Group 5 ===
| Pos | Team | Pld | W | D | L | GF | GA | GD | Pts | MAL | KAI | COT | B05 |
|---|---|---|---|---|---|---|---|---|---|---|---|---|---|
| 1 | (Sweden) Malmö FF | 6 | 3 | 2 | 1 | 10 | 4 | +6 | 8 | — | 1–1 | 5–0 | 1–0 |
| 2 | (West Germany) Kaiserslautern | 6 | 2 | 3 | 1 | 11 | 9 | +2 | 7 | 3–1 | — | 2–2 | 1–1 |
| 3 | (East Germany) Energie Cottbus | 6 | 3 | 1 | 2 | 10 | 10 | 0 | 7 | 0–2 | 4–0 | — | 2–0 |
| 4 | (Czechoslovakia) Bohemians Prague | 6 | 0 | 2 | 4 | 2 | 10 | −8 | 2 | 0–0 | 0–4 | 1–2 | — |

Source: Pawel Mogielnicki's Page 1990
Rules for classification: 1) Points; 2) Goal difference; 3) Goals scored; 4) Head-to-head points; 5) Away goals scored; 6) Draw.

=== Group 6 ===
| Pos | Team | Pld | W | D | L | GF | GA | GD | Pts | GAIS | BRØ | KAR | ROS |
|---|---|---|---|---|---|---|---|---|---|---|---|---|---|
| 1 | (Sweden) GAIS | 6 | 3 | 2 | 1 | 13 | 7 | +6 | 8 | — | 3–2 | 1–1 | 2–1 |
| 2 | (Denmark) Brøndby | 6 | 3 | 1 | 2 | 15 | 11 | +4 | 7 | 1–1 | — | 4–2 | 2–0 |
| 3 | (West Germany) Karlsruhe | 6 | 2 | 1 | 3 | 12 | 12 | 0 | 5 | 2–0 | 3–4 | — | 4–1 |
| 4 | (East Germany) Hansa Rostock | 6 | 2 | 0 | 4 | 7 | 17 | −10 | 4 | 0–6 | 3–2 | 2–1 | — |

Source: Pawel Mogielnicki's Page 1990
Rules for classification: 1) Points; 2) Goal difference; 3) Goals scored; 4) Head-to-head points; 5) Away goals scored; 6) Draw.

=== Group 7 ===
| Pos | Team | Pld | W | D | L | GF | GA | GD | Pts | LUZ | NIT | ÖRE | TAT |
|---|---|---|---|---|---|---|---|---|---|---|---|---|---|
| 1 | (Switzerland) Luzern | 6 | 4 | 1 | 1 | 13 | 8 | +5 | 9 | — | 1–1 | 3–0 | 3–2 |
| 2 | (Czechoslovakia) Plastika Nitra | 6 | 2 | 3 | 1 | 6 | 3 | +3 | 7 | 0–2 | — | 1–0 | 4–0 |
| 3 | (Sweden) Örebro | 6 | 2 | 2 | 2 | 8 | 6 | +2 | 6 | 2–0 | 0–0 | — | 5–1 |
| 4 | (Hungary) Tatabánya | 6 | 0 | 2 | 4 | 7 | 17 | −10 | 2 | 3–4 | 0–0 | 1–1 | — |

Source: Pawel Mogielnicki's Page 1990
Rules for classification: 1) Points; 2) Goal difference; 3) Goals scored; 4) Head-to-head points; 5) Away goals scored; 6) Draw.

=== Group 8 ===
| Pos | Team | Pld | W | D | L | GF | GA | GD | Pts | FIR | AGF | VAS | GIF |
|---|---|---|---|---|---|---|---|---|---|---|---|---|---|
| 1 | (Austria) Vienna | 6 | 3 | 2 | 1 | 7 | 5 | +2 | 8 | — | 1–1 | 0–1 | 2–1 |
| 2 | (Denmark) AGF Aarhus | 6 | 2 | 3 | 1 | 6 | 3 | +3 | 7 | 1–2 | — | 2–0 | 0–0 |
| 3 | (Hungary) Vasas | 6 | 2 | 2 | 2 | 4 | 5 | −1 | 6 | 0–0 | 0–2 | — | 1–1 |
| 4 | (Sweden) Gefle IF | 6 | 0 | 3 | 3 | 3 | 7 | −4 | 3 | 1–2 | 0–0 | 0–2 | — |

Source: Pawel Mogielnicki's Page 1990
Rules for classification: 1) Points; 2) Goal difference; 3) Goals scored; 4) Head-to-head points; 5) Away goals scored; 6) Draw.

=== Group 9 ===
| Pos | Team | Pld | W | D | L | GF | GA | GD | Pts | CHE | STU | DÜS | PET |
|---|---|---|---|---|---|---|---|---|---|---|---|---|---|
| 1 | (East Germany) Chemnitz | 6 | 3 | 2 | 1 | 4 | 2 | +2 | 8 | — | 0–0 | 2–0 | 1–0 |
| 2 | (Austria) Sturm Graz | 6 | 2 | 3 | 1 | 9 | 3 | +6 | 7 | 0–0 | — | 0–0 | 6–1 |
| 3 | (West Germany) Fortuna Düsseldorf | 6 | 2 | 2 | 2 | 6 | 6 | 0 | 6 | 2–0 | 1–0 | — | 1–1 |
| 4 | (Romania) Petrolul Ploiești | 6 | 1 | 1 | 4 | 6 | 14 | −8 | 3 | 0–1 | 1–3 | 3–2 | — |

Source: Pawel Mogielnicki's Page 1990
Rules for classification: 1) Points; 2) Goal difference; 3) Goals scored; 4) Head-to-head points; 5) Away goals scored; 6) Draw.

=== Group 10 ===
| Pos | Team | Pld | W | D | L | GF | GA | GD | Pts | UER | OLI | DYN | GCZ |
|---|---|---|---|---|---|---|---|---|---|---|---|---|---|
| 1 | (West Germany) Bayer Uerdingen | 6 | 3 | 2 | 1 | 11 | 7 | +4 | 8 | — | 2–1 | 3–0 | 2–2 |
| 2 | (Socialist Federal Republic of Yugoslavia) Olimpija Ljubljana | 6 | 2 | 2 | 2 | 10 | 8 | +2 | 6 | 1–1 | — | 1–0 | 4–1 |
| 3 | (East Germany) FC Berlin | 6 | 2 | 1 | 3 | 7 | 9 | −2 | 5 | 1–2 | 1–1 | — | 2–1 |
| 4 | (Switzerland) Grasshopper Club | 6 | 2 | 1 | 3 | 10 | 14 | −4 | 5 | 2–1 | 3–2 | 1–3 | — |

Source: Pawel Mogielnicki's Page 1990
Rules for classification: 1) Points; 2) Goal difference; 3) Goals scored; 4) Head-to-head points; 5) Away goals scored; 6) Draw.

=== Group 11 ===
| Pos | Team | Pld | W | D | L | GF | GA | GD | Pts | OB | PIR | OSI | SPO |
|---|---|---|---|---|---|---|---|---|---|---|---|---|---|
| 1 | (Denmark) OB | 6 | 2 | 4 | 0 | 12 | 6 | +6 | 8 | — | 2–0 | 5–1 | 2–2 |
| 2 | (Bulgaria) Pirin Blagoevgrad | 6 | 3 | 2 | 1 | 8 | 5 | +3 | 8 | 1–1 | — | 2–1 | 2–0 |
| 3 | (Socialist Federal Republic of Yugoslavia) Osijek | 6 | 2 | 1 | 3 | 9 | 10 | −1 | 5 | 0–0 | 0–2 | — | 3–1 |
| 4 | (Romania) Sportul București | 6 | 0 | 3 | 3 | 6 | 14 | −8 | 3 | 2–2 | 1–1 | 0–4 | — |

Source: Pawel Mogielnicki's Page 1990
Rules for classification: 1) Points; 2) Goal difference; 3) Goals scored; 4) Head-to-head points; 5) Away goals scored; 6) Draw.

== See also ==
- 1990–91 European Cup
- 1990–91 European Cup Winners' Cup
- 1990–91 UEFA Cup

== Sources ==
- Intertoto history at Pawel Mogielnicki's Page
