= 1991–92 Nationalliga A =

Swiss football season

Nationalliga A
- Season: 1991–92
- Champions: Sion
- Relegated: none
- Top goalscorer: Miklos Molnar, Servette, (18 goals)

Nationalliga B
- Season: 1991–92
- Champions: No team was declared champions
- Promoted: none
- Relegated: ES Malley; SC Zug; FC Glarus
- Top goalscorer: n/a

Statistics of the Swiss National League in the 1991–92 football season, both Nationalliga A and Nationalliga B.

== Overview ==
The 36 teams of the Swiss Football League (Nationalliga) were divided into two tiers. In the top-tier, there were 12 teams that played in the Nationalliga A (NLA). There were 24 teams in the Nationalliga B (NLB), the second tier, these were divided into two groups, a West and an East group. Each team in each group played a double round-robin in the qualification phase. Thereafter the divisions were divided into a Swiss championship group with the top eight teams from the qualification and two promotion/relegation groups (NLA/NLB), both with eight teams. These were the bottom four teams from the NLA qualification and the top six teams from both of the NLB qualification groups. Further, there were two relegation groups (NLB/1. Liga), each group with six teams. The last team in each NLB relegation group were to be relegated directly and the two fifth placed teams in each group played a play-out against relegation to decide the third relegation.

== Nationalliga A ==
=== Qualification phase ===
The first stage of the NLA began on 24 July 1991 and was completed on 8 December. The top eight teams in the qualification phase would advance to the championship group and the last four teams would play against relegation.

==== Table ====
Pos	Team	Pld	W	D	L	GF	GA	GD	Pts	Qualification
1	Lausanne-Sport	22	10	10	2	42	17	+25	30	Advance to championship round halved points (rounded up) as bonus
2	Grasshopper Club	22	12	5	5	39	24	+15	29	Advance to championship round halved points (rounded up) as bonus
3	Sion	22	9	10	3	34	20	+14	28	Advance to championship round halved points (rounded up) as bonus
4	Servette	22	10	7	5	37	28	+9	27	Advance to championship round halved points (rounded up) as bonus
5	Xamax	22	9	6	7	28	22	+6	24	Advance to championship round halved points (rounded up) as bonus
6	St. Gallen	22	8	6	8	27	32	−5	22	Advance to championship round halved points (rounded up) as bonus
7	Young Boys	22	8	5	9	30	30	0	21	Advance to championship round halved points (rounded up) as bonus
8	Zürich	22	4	12	6	22	25	−3	20	Advance to championship round halved points (rounded up) as bonus
9	Luzern	22	5	10	7	21	26	−5	20	Continue to promotion/relegation round
10	Lugano	22	6	8	8	25	36	−11	20	Continue to promotion/relegation round
11	Aarau	22	3	8	11	21	39	−18	14	Continue to promotion/relegation round
12	Wettingen	22	1	7	14	18	45	−27	9	Continue to promotion/relegation round

Source: rsssf.com
Rules for classification: 1) Points; 2) Goal difference; 3) Goals scored; 4) Head-to-head points; 5) Away goals scored; 6) Draw.

==== Results ====
Home \ Away	AAR	GCZ	LS	LUG	LUZ	NX	SER	SIO	STG	WET	YB	ZÜR
Aarau		4–0	0–3	0–0	2–0	1–2	0–1	2–2	1–2	2–0	1–4	1–3
Grasshopper	3–1		2–1	1–1	3–1	0–1	1–0	0–1	5–0	3–1	2–1	3–1
Lausanne-Sport	5–0	2–2		4–0	0–0	2–1	4–0	0–0	1–1	2–0	3–3	2–0
Lugano	1–1	2–2	0–3		3–2	3–1	0–2	0–0	2–1	2–0	1–4	2–2
Luzern	0–0	1–3	1–0	1–0		1–1	1–0	0–0	3–0	0–0	1–1	0–1
Neuchâtel Xamax	1–0	0–1	1–1	3–0	1–1		0–3	0–2	1–0	2–1	3–0	3–0
Servette	2–2	2–1	1–1	2–1	6–3	1–1		0–2	3–3	1–1	2–0	0–0
Sion	1–1	1–1	2–2	0–0	2–2	0–0	2–3		2–1	5–0	3–0	2–1
St. Gallen	2–0	2–0	0–2	2–2	2–1	2–1	2–4	0–2		1–0	2–0	0–0
Wettingen	2–2	0–3	1–1	3–0	1–1	0–4	0–3	2–3	1–3		0–1	1–1
Young Boys	5–0	0–2	1–2	1–3	0–0	2–0	2–0	1–0	0–0	4–3		0–2
Zürich	0–0	1–1	1–1	1–2	0–1	1–1	1–1	4–2	1–1	1–1	0–0	

Source: rsssf.com
Legend: Blue = home team win; Yellow = draw; Red = away team win.

=== Championship group ===
The first eight teams of the qualification phase competed in the Championship round. The teams took half of the points (rounded up to complete units) gained in the qualification as bonus with them. The championship group began on 1 March 1992 and was completed on 30 May.

==== Table ====
Pos	Team	Pld	W	D	L	GF	GA	GD	BP	Pts	Qualification
1	Sion	14	7	5	2	23	16	+7	14	33	Swiss champions, qualified for 1992–93 UEFA Champions League
2	Xamax	14	7	5	2	27	16	+11	12	31	Qualified for 1992–93 UEFA Cup
3	Grasshopper Club	14	6	3	5	18	14	+4	15	30	Qualified for 1992–93 UEFA Cup and entered 1992 Intertoto Cup
4	Young Boys	14	7	3	4	24	16	+8	11	28	Entered 1992 Intertoto Cup
5	Servette	14	4	5	5	23	22	+1	14	27	
6	Lausanne Sports	14	2	4	8	11	22	−11	15	23	Entered 1992 Intertoto Cup
7	Zürich	14	3	6	5	17	27	−10	10	22	
8	St. Gallen	14	3	3	8	18	28	−10	11	20	Entered 1992 Intertoto Cup

Source: rsssf.com
Rules for classification: 1) points; 2) Position in the qualification.

==== Results ====
Home \ Away	GCZ	LS	NX	SER	SIO	STG	YB	ZÜR
Grasshopper		0–0	0–0	2–0	0–1	4–1	0–3	3–0
Lausanne-Sport	1–1		1–1	3–2	0–3	2–1	1–3	0–1
Neuchâtel Xamax	1–0	3–1		5–1	2–2	3–1	0–1	3–1
Servette	1–2	1–0	1–1		0–0	4–0	3–0	3–3
Sion	3–1	1–0	3–1	4–3		2–1	0–0	1–1
St. Gallen	1–2	1–0	2–2	0–2	3–2		4–1	1–1
Young Boys	2–1	2–0	1–2	0–0	4–1	1–1		1–2
Zürich	0–2	2–2	1–3	2–2	0–0	2–1	1–5	

Source: rsssf.com
Legend: Blue = home team win; Yellow = draw; Red = away team win.

== Nationalliga B ==
=== Qualification phase ===
The qualification of the NLB began on 28 July 1993 and was completed on 21 November. The top six teams in each group were qualified to play in the two promotion/relegation groups. The bottom six teams in each group then played in the newly drawn groups against relegation.

==== Table group East ====
Pos	Team	Pld	W	D	L	GF	GA	GD	Pts	Qualification
1	FC Schaffhausen	22	11	8	3	54	20	+34	30	Promotion round
2	FC Baden	22	12	5	5	36	22	+14	29	Promotion round
3	FC Chiasso	22	10	7	5	47	22	+25	27	Promotion round
4	AC Bellinzona	22	9	8	5	43	24	+19	26	Promotion round
5	FC Chur	22	10	6	6	30	22	+8	26	Promotion round
6	FC Locarno	22	8	9	5	29	20	+9	25	Promotion round
7	FC Winterthur	22	9	5	8	37	32	+5	23	Relegation round
8	SC Zug	22	9	3	10	28	39	−11	21	Relegation round
9	FC Brüttisellen	22	6	7	9	22	38	−16	19	Relegation round
10	SC Kriens	22	6	5	11	23	36	−13	17	Relegation round
11	FC Glarus	22	4	3	15	16	60	−44	11	Relegation round
12	FC Emmenbrücke	22	4	2	16	18	48	−30	10	Relegation round

Source: rsssf.com
Rules for classification: 1) Points; 2) Goal difference; 3) Goals scored; 4) Head-to-head points; 5) Away goals scored; 6) Draw.

==== Table group West ====
Pos	Team	Pld	W	D	L	GF	GA	GD	Pts	Qualification
1	FC Basel	22	13	5	4	42	30	+12	31	Promotion round
2	FC Grenchen	22	10	7	5	40	27	+13	27	Promotion round
3	Yverdon-Sport FC	22	11	5	6	47	34	+13	27	Promotion round
4	FC Bulle	22	9	8	5	45	29	+16	26	Promotion round
5	ES FC Malley	22	11	4	7	36	30	+6	26	Promotion round
6	FC La Chaux-de-Fonds	22	8	9	5	33	23	+10	25	Promotion round
7	BSC Old Boys	22	9	5	8	38	26	+12	23	Relegation round
8	Urania Genève Sport	22	9	5	8	37	33	+4	23	Relegation round
9	FC Fribourg	22	8	4	10	35	37	−2	20	Relegation round
10	Étoile Carouge FC	22	5	5	12	33	56	−23	15	Relegation round
11	FC Châtel-Saint-Denis	22	5	4	13	22	45	−23	14	Relegation round
12	SR Delémont	22	2	3	17	22	60	−38	7	Relegation round

Source: rsssf.com
Rules for classification: 1) Points; 2) Goal difference; 3) Goals scored; 4) Head-to-head points; 5) Away goals scored; 6) Draw.

=== Promotion/relegation round ===
==== Group A ====
===== Table =====
Pos	Team	Pld	W	D	L	GF	GA	GD	Pts	Qualification
1	Lugano	14	8	6	0	25	8	+17	22	Remain in Nationalliga A 1992–93
2	Aarau	14	7	5	2	20	13	+7	19	Remain in Nationalliga A 1992–93
3	Yverdon-Sports	14	6	6	2	24	17	+7	18	Remain in Nationalliga B 1992–93
4	Basel	14	4	6	4	20	22	−2	14	Remain in Nationalliga B 1992–93
5	Baden	14	2	9	3	14	16	−2	13	Remain in Nationalliga B 1992–93
6	Locarno	14	3	4	7	19	19	0	10	Remain in Nationalliga B 1992–93
7	ES Malley	14	3	4	7	18	30	−12	10	License revoked Relegated to 1992–93 1. Liga
8	Bellinzona	14	2	2	10	14	29	−15	6	Remain in Nationalliga B 1992–93

Source: rsssf.com
Rules for classification: 1) Points; 2) Goal difference; 3) Goals scored; 4) Head-to-head points; 5) Away goals scored; 6) Draw.

===== Results =====
Home \ Away	AAR	BAD	BAS	BEL	LOC	LUG	MAL	YS
Aarau		0–0	0–0	2–0	1–0	0–3 (Note: Match awarded.)	4–1	2–3
Baden	0–1		2–1	1–1	1–1	0–2	0–0	0–0
Basel	2–4	3–3		2–1	2–2	2–2	1–0	1–1
Bellinzona	2–3	1–3	2–1		1–0	0–0	2–4	1–4
Locarno	0–1	0–0	3–0	1–0		1–2	6–0	2–4
Lugano	0–0	1–1	1–1	2–1	1–0		1–0	2–0
Malley	1–1	2–2	0–2	4–1	5–2	0–6		0–0
Yverdon-Sport	1–1	3–1	1–2	2–1	1–1	2–2	2–1	

Source: rsssf.com
Legend: Blue = home team win; Yellow = draw; Red = away team win.

==== Group B ====
===== Table =====
Pos	Team	Pld	W	D	L	GF	GA	GD	Pts	Qualification
1	Chiasso	14	8	4	2	28	16	+12	20	Remain in Nationalliga A 1992–93
2	Bulle	14	8	3	3	29	17	+12	19	Remain in Nationalliga A 1992–93
3	FC Schaffhausen	14	8	3	3	24	14	+10	19	Remain in Nationalliga B 1992–93
4	Luzern	14	8	3	3	24	14	+10	19	Remain in Nationalliga B 1992–93
5	Wettingen	14	6	1	7	20	24	−4	13	Remain in Nationalliga B 1992–93
6	Grenchen	14	3	5	6	18	28	−10	11	Remain in Nationalliga B 1992–93
7	La Chaux-de-Fonds	14	2	2	10	21	31	−10	6	Remain in Nationalliga B 1992–93
8	Chur	14	1	3	10	13	33	−20	5	Remain in Nationalliga B 1992–93

Source: rsssf.com
Rules for classification: 1) Points; 2) Goal difference; 3) Goals scored; 4) Head-to-head points; 5) Away goals scored; 6) Draw.

===== Results =====
Home \ Away	BUL	CDF	CHI	CHU	GRE	LUZ	SHA	WET
Bulle		3–2	2–3	3–0	2–0	2–1	1–1	3–0
Chaux-de-Fonds	1–2		1–3	4–1	3–1	2–3	1–2	1–3
Chiasso	2–1	4–2		2–1	3–0	1–1	0–1	4–1
Chur	3–3	0–0	1–1		2–1	1–3	0–2	2–4
Grenchen	2–2	1–1	1–1	2–1		2–1	4–2	2–4
Luzern	2–1	3–0	4–1	1–0	1–1		1–1	1–0
Schaffhausen	0–1	4–3	0–0	3–0	5–1	1–0		0–1
Wettingen	0–3	1–0	0–3	4–1	0–0	1–2	1–2	

Source: rsssf.com
Legend: Blue = home team win; Yellow = draw; Red = away team win.

=== Relegation round NLB/1. Liga ===
The last six teams in each of the two qualification phase groups competed in two relegation groups against relegation to the 1. Liga 1992–93. The teams were drawn into these two groups and received ranking bonus points from their qualifying groups (7th place 6 pts; 8th place 5 pts; 9th place 4 pts; etc). There was to be one direct relegation in each group, plus a play-out against relegation between both second last placed teams. This stage began on 8 March 1992 and was completed on 23 May.

==== Table group A ====
Pos	Team	Pld	W	D	L	GF	GA	GD	BP	Pts	Qualification
1	FC Fribourg	10	6	3	1	22	6	+16	4	19	Remain in NLB 1992–93
2	SC Kriens	10	4	6	0	13	4	+9	3	17	Remain in NLB 1992–93
3	BSC Old Boys	10	3	4	3	12	15	−3	6	16	Remain in NLB 1992–93
4	SC Zug	10	3	2	5	9	14	−5	5	13	License revoked Relegated to 1992–93 1. Liga
5	FC Châtel-Saint-Denis	10	2	4	4	13	17	−4	2	10	Play-out against relegation
6	FC Emmenbrücke	10	1	3	6	6	19	−13	1	6	Remain in NLB 1992–93

Source: rsssf.com
Rules for classification: 1) Points; 2) Goal difference; 3) Goals scored; 4) Head-to-head points; 5) Away goals scored; 6) Draw.

Note: because SC Zug had their license revoked FC Emmenbrücke remained in NLB 1992–93

==== Table group B ====
Pos	Team	Pld	W	D	L	GF	GA	GD	BP	Pts	Qualification
1	FC Winterthur	10	5	2	3	22	13	+9	6	18	Remain in NLB 1992–93
2	SR Delémont	10	6	3	1	23	9	+14	1	16	Remain in NLB 1992–93
3	Urania Genève Sport	10	4	3	3	20	15	+5	5	16	Remain in NLB 1992–93
4	Étoile Carouge FC	10	4	3	3	17	15	+2	3	14	Remain in NLB 1992–93
5	FC Brüttisellen	10	4	1	5	18	19	−1	4	13	Play-out against relegation
6	FC Glarus	10	0	2	8	6	35	−29	2	4	Relegation to 1. Liga 1992–93

Source: rsssf.com
Rules for classification: 1) Points; 2) Goal difference; 3) Goals scored; 4) Head-to-head points; 5) Away goals scored; 6) Draw.

==== Relegation play-out ====
Team 1	Score	Team 2
FC Châtel-Saint-Denis	1–3	FC Brüttisellen
FC Brüttisellen	0–1	FC Châtel-Saint-Denis

FC Brüttisellen win 3–2 on aggregate. FC Châtel-Saint-Denis were originally relegated, however, because ES FC Malley had their license revoked they remained in NLB 1992–93

== Attendances ==
#	Club	Average
1	Sion	10,586
2	Xamax	10,294
3	Lausanne	8,119
4	Servette	7,956
5	Luzern	7,939
6	St. Gallen	7,389
7	Young Boys	6,478
8	Zürich	6,144
9	GCZ	6,128
10	Aarau	3,733
11	Lugano	3,661
12	Wettingen	2,038

== Further in Swiss football ==
- 1991–92 Swiss Cup
- 1991–92 Swiss 1. Liga

== Sources ==
- Switzerland 1991–92 at RSSSF

Preceded by 1990–91	Nationalliga seasons in Switzerland	Succeeded by 1992–93
