= 1991 Intertoto Cup =

European football competition

In the 1991 Intertoto Cup no knock-out rounds were contested, and therefore no winner was declared.

== Group stage ==
The teams were divided into 9 groups of 4 teams and 1 group of 3 teams each. In two groups teams withdrew from the tournament before it finished.

=== Group 1 ===
Pos	Team	Pld	W	D	L	GF	GA	GD	Pts	NEU	SLO	MAL	TAT
1	(Switzerland) Neuchâtel Xamax	6	4	2	0	14	3	+11	10	—	2–2	0–0	5–0
2	(Czechoslovakia) Slovan Bratislava	6	1	3	2	10	11	−1	5	0–2	—	1–1	4–2
3	(Sweden) Malmö FF	6	0	5	1	5	6	−1	5	1–2	2–2	—	0–0
4	(Hungary) Tatabánya	6	1	2	3	5	14	−9	4	0–3	2–1	1–1	—

Source: Pawel Mogielnicki's Page

=== Group 2 ===
Pos	Team	Pld	W	D	L	GF	GA	GD	Pts	LS	LYN	ZAG	NOR
1	(Switzerland) Lausanne-Sport	6	5	0	1	22	7	+15	10	—	4–1	8–1	3–1
2	(Denmark) Lyngby BK	6	4	0	2	16	12	+4	8	3–1	—	3–0	3–1
3	(Poland) Zagłębie Lubin	6	2	1	3	9	17	−8	5	1–3	3–0	—	2–1
4	(Sweden) IFK Norrköping	6	0	1	5	8	19	−11	1	0–3	2–6	3–2	—

Source: Pawel Mogielnicki's Page

=== Group 3 ===
Pos	Team	Pld	W	D	L	GF	GA	GD	Pts	SAL	HAL	VÁC	IKA
1	Austria Salzburg	6	4	2	0	7	2	+5	10	—	0–0	1–1	2–0
2	(Germany) Halle	6	3	1	2	13	6	+7	7	0–1	—	5–1	5–2
3	(Hungary) Váci Izzó	6	2	1	3	8	11	−3	5	1–2	2–1	—	2–0
4	(Denmark) Ikast FS	6	1	0	5	4	13	−9	2	0–1	0–2	2–1	—

Source: Pawel Mogielnicki's Page
29 June 1991

Halle (Germany)	0–1	Austria Salzburg
		Aigner 50'

Kurt-Wabbel-Stadion, Halle

3 July 1991

Ikast FS (Denmark)	0–1	Austria Salzburg
		Willfurth 10'

Ikast Stadion, Ikast
3 July 1991

Váci Izzó (Hungary)	2–1	(Germany) Halle
Füle 47'; Szalai 51'		Schulz 38'

Ligeti Stadion, Vác

6 July 1991

Halle (Germany)	5–2	(Denmark) Ikast FS

Kurt-Wabbel-Stadion, Halle

7 July 1991

Váci Izzó (Hungary)	1–2	Austria Salzburg
Szalai 8'		Golubica 1'; Sabitzer 38'

Ligeti Stadion, Vác

10 July 1991

Austria Salzburg	0–0	(Germany) Halle

Achstadion, Altheim
10 July 1991

Váci Izzó (Hungary)	2–0	(Denmark) Ikast FS
Füle 61'; Romanek 82'

Ligeti Stadion, Vác

13 July 1991

Halle (Germany)	5–1	(Hungary) Váci Izzó

Kurt-Wabbel-Stadion, Halle

14 July 1991

Austria Salzburg	2–0	(Denmark) Ikast FS
Hrstic 7'; Willfurth 66'

Sportzentrum Aug, Seekirchen am Wallersee

17 July 1991

Austria Salzburg	1–1	(Hungary) Váci Izzó
Sabitzer 17'		Bánföldi 25'

Stadion Lehen, Salzburg
17 July 1991

Ikast FS (Denmark)	0–2	(Germany) Halle

Ikast Stadion, Ikast

21 July 1991

Ikast FS (Denmark)	2–1	(Hungary) Váci Izzó

Ikast Stadion, Ikast

=== Group 4 ===
Pos	Team	Pld	W	D	L	GF	GA	GD	Pts	DBB	SIL	HAM	COT
1	(Czechoslovakia) Dukla Banská Bystrica	6	5	0	1	11	3	+8	10	—	2–0	0–1	1–0
2	(Denmark) Silkeborg IF	6	4	0	2	13	9	+4	8	1–4	—	4–1	4–1
3	(Sweden) Hammarby IF	6	2	0	4	8	12	−4	4	1–2	1–3	—	3–0
4	(Germany) Energie Cottbus	6	1	0	5	4	12	−8	2	0–2	0–1	3–1	—

Source: Pawel Mogielnicki's Page

=== Group 5 ===
Pos	Team	Pld	W	D	L	GF	GA	GD	Pts	B03	AWI	DJU	CHE
1	(Denmark) B 1903	6	5	0	1	13	5	+8	10	—	1–0	2–3	3–0
2	Austria Wien	6	4	0	2	9	6	+3	8	1–3	—	1–0	4–1
3	(Sweden) Djurgårdens IF	6	1	1	4	5	8	−3	3	1–2	1–2	—	0–0
4	(Czech Republic) Cheb	6	1	1	4	2	10	−8	3	0–2	0–1	1–0	—

Source: Pawel Mogielnicki's Page

=== Group 6 ===
Pos	Team	Pld	W	D	L	GF	GA	GD	Pts	GCZ	SIÓ	FRE	Lju
1	(Switzerland) Grasshopper Club	4	2	1	1	5	5	0	5	—	1–0	3–2	–
2	(Hungary) Siófok	4	1	2	1	8	6	+2	4	1–1	—	3–3	–
3	(Denmark) Frem	4	1	1	2	8	10	−2	3	2–0	1–4	—	–
4	(Slovenia) Olimpija Ljubljana	0	0	0	0	0	0	0	0	–	–	–	—

Source: Pawel Mogielnicki's Page

(Slovenia) Olimpija Ljubljana withdrew during the tournament.

=== Group 7 ===
Pos	Team	Pld	W	D	L	GF	GA	GD	Pts	UER	PIR	ÖST	STU
1	(Germany) Bayer Uerdingen	6	3	1	2	7	6	+1	7	—	1–0	2–1	3–1
2	(Bulgaria) Pirin Blagoevgrad	6	2	2	2	6	4	+2	6	2–0	—	1–1	2–0
3	(Sweden) Östers IF	6	1	4	1	6	5	+1	6	1–1	0–0	—	2–0
4	(Austria) Sturm Graz	6	2	1	3	5	9	−4	5	1–0	2–1	1–1	—

Source: Pawel Mogielnicki's Page

=== Group 8 ===
Pos	Team	Pld	W	D	L	GF	GA	GD	Pts	DAC	RAP	PLO	ESS
1	(Czechoslovakia) Dunajská Streda	4	3	0	1	10	3	+7	6	—	3–0	4–1	–
2	(Romania) Rapid București	4	2	0	2	3	9	−6	4	1–0	—	2–1	–
3	(Bulgaria) Botev Plovdiv	4	1	0	3	8	9	−1	2	1–3	5–0	—	–
4	(Germany) Rot-Weiss Essen	0	0	0	0	0	0	0	0	–	–	–	—

Source: Pawel Mogielnicki's Page

(Germany) Rot-Weiss Essen withdrew before the start of tournament.

29 June 1991

Rapid București (Romania)	2–1	(Bulgaria) Botev Plovdiv
Dragan 28'; Constantinovici 48' (pen.)		Kostadinov 11'

Giulești-Valentin Stănescu, Bucharest

3 July 1991

Botev Plovdiv (Bulgaria)	1–3	(Czechoslovakia) Dunajská Streda
Dobrevski 81'		Radványi 39'; Súkenník 82'; Renczés 90'

Hristo Botev, Plovdiv

6 July 1991

Rapid București (Romania)	1–0	(Czechoslovakia) Dunajská Streda
Tsipa 81'

Giulești-Valentin Stănescu, Bucharest

10 July 1991

Dunajská Streda (Czechoslovakia)	4–1	(Bulgaria) Botev Plovdiv
Radványi 12', 60'; Diňa 63' (pen.); Simon 74'		Dobrevski 20'

Mestský štadión, Dunajská Streda

13 July 1991

Dunajská Streda (Czechoslovakia)	3–0	(Romania) Rapid București
Radványi 13', 85'; Prokop 45'

Mestský štadión, Dunajská Streda

20 July 1991

Botev Plovdiv (Bulgaria)	5–0	(Romania) Rapid București
Bakalov 15'; Hvoynev 17', 36', 75'; Dobrevski 66'

Hristo Botev, Plovdiv

=== Group 9 ===
Pos	Team	Pld	W	D	L	GF	GA	GD	Pts	TIN	LUG	SPO	BUD
1	(Austria) Tirol Innsbruck	4	3	0	1	11	4	+7	6	—	2–1	6–0	–
2	(Switzerland) Lugano	4	2	0	2	7	6	+1	4	2–1	—	4–1	–
3	(Romania) Sportul București	4	1	0	3	4	12	−8	2	1–2	2–0	—	–
4	(Socialist Federal Republic of Yugoslavia) Budućnost Titograd	0	0	0	0	0	0	0	0	–	–	–	—

Source: Pawel Mogielnicki's Page

(Socialist Federal Republic of Yugoslavia) Budućnost Titograd withdrew during the tournament.

=== Group 10 ===
Pos	Team	Pld	W	D	L	GF	GA	GD	Pts	ÖRE	SAA	MHA	HPT
1	(Sweden) Örebro	6	5	1	0	11	4	+7	11	—	2–2	1–0	1–0
2	(Germany) Saarbrücken	6	3	2	1	23	10	+13	8	1–2	—	5–1	7–3
3	(Israel) Maccabi Haifa	6	2	0	4	6	17	−11	4	0–3	0–6	—	2–0
4	(Israel) Hapoel Petah Tikva	6	0	1	5	8	17	−9	1	1–2	2–2	2–3	—

Source: Pawel Mogielnicki's Page

== See also ==
- 1991–92 European Cup
- 1991–92 European Cup Winners' Cup
- 1991–92 UEFA Cup
