= 1991–92 Swiss 1. Liga =

1. Liga
- Season: 1991–92
- Champions: Group 1: Chênois; Group 2: Bümpliz; Group 3: Red Star; Group 4: FC Tuggen
- Promoted: Chênois; Wil; Bümpliz
- Relegated: Group 1: Collex-Bossy; Aigle; Concordia/Folgore Lausanne; Group 2: Domdidier; Bern; Group 3: Stabio; Wangen bei Olten; Group 4: Balzers; Kreuzlingen
- Matches: 4 times 182 and 3 deciders plus 13 play-offs and 4 play-outs

The 1991–92 Swiss 1. Liga was the 60th season of this league since its creation in 1931. At this time, the 1. Liga was the third tier of the Swiss football league system and it was the highest level of amateur football.

== Format ==
There were 56 clubs in the 1. Liga, divided into four regional groups of 14 teams. Within each group, the teams would play a double round-robin to decide their league position. Two points were awarded for a win. The four group winners and the four runners-up then contested a play-off for the three promotion slots. The two last placed teams in each group were directly relegated to the 2. Liga (fourth tier). The four third-last placed teams would compete a play-out against the ninth relegation spot.

== Group 1 ==
=== Teams ===
Club	Canton	Stadium	Capacity
FC Aigle	Vaud	Les Glariers	1,000
CS Chênois	Geneva	Stade des Trois-Chêne	8,000
FC Collex-Bossy	Geneva	Stade Marc Burdet	1,000
Concordia/Folgore Lausanne	Vaud	Centre Sportif de la Tuilière	1,000
FC Fully	Valais	Stade de Charnot	1,000
Grand-Lancy FC	Geneva	Stade de Marignac	1,500
FC Martigny-Sports	Valais	Stade d'Octodure	2,500
FC Monthey	Valais	Stade Philippe Pottier	1,800
FC Montreux-Sports	Vaud	Stade de Chailly	1,000
FC Raron	Valais	Sportplatz Rhoneglut	1,000
FC Renens	Waadt	Zone sportive du Censuy	2,300
FC Savièse	Valais	Stade St-Germain	2,000
FC Stade Lausanne	Vaud	Centre sportif de Vidy	1,000
FC Versoix	Geneva	Centre sportif de la Bécassière	1,000

=== Final league table ===
Pos	Team	Pld	W	D	L	GF	GA	GD	Pts	Qualification or relegation
1	CS Chênois	26	18	6	2	56	15	+41	42	Play-off to Nationalliga B
2	FC Martigny-Sports	26	17	6	3	63	27	+36	40	Play-off to Nationalliga B
3	FC Monthey	26	14	8	4	47	23	+24	36	
4	FC Fully	26	13	6	7	40	34	+6	32	
5	FC Raron	26	8	10	8	40	33	+7	26	
6	Grand-Lancy FC	26	8	8	10	37	42	−5	24	
7	FC Montreux-Sports	26	8	7	11	30	35	−5	23	
8	FC Stade Lausanne	26	8	7	11	37	55	−18	23	
9	FC Renens	26	10	3	13	39	40	−1	23	
10	FC Versoix	26	10	2	14	36	46	−10	22	
11	FC Savièse	26	7	8	11	43	63	−20	22	
12	FC Collex-Bossy	26	6	7	13	32	53	−21	19	Play-out against relegation
13	FC Aigle	26	6	6	14	36	41	−5	18	Relegation to 2. Liga Interregional
14	Concordia/Folgore Lausanne	26	4	6	16	20	49	−29	14	Relegation to 2. Liga Interregional

Source: RSSSF
Rules for classification: 1) Points; 2) Goal difference within the league, but decider play-off for qualifiers.

== Group 2 ==
=== Teams ===
Club	Canton	Stadium	Capacity
FC Bern	Bern	Stadion Neufeld	14,000
SC Bümpliz 78	Bern	Bodenweid	4,000
SC Burgdorf	canton of Bern	Stadion Neumatt	3,850
FC Colombier	Neuchâtel	Stade des Chézards	2,500
FC Domdidier	Fribourg	Terrains de football - Domdidier	1,000
FC Echallens	Vaud	Sportplatz 3 Sapins	2,000
FC Klus-Balsthal	Solothurn	Sportplatz Moos	4,000
FC Lerchenfeld	canton of Bern	Sportanlagen Waldeck	2,400
SV Lyss	Bern	Sportzentrum Grien	2,000
FC Moutier	Bern	Stade de Chalière	5,000
FC Münsingen	Bern	Sportanlage Sandreutenen	1,400
FC Serrières	Neuchâtel	Pierre-à-Bot	1,700
FC Solothurn	Solothurn	Stadion FC Solothurn	6,750
FC Thun	Bern	Stadion Lachen	10,350

=== Final league table ===
Pos	Team	Pld	W	D	L	GF	GA	GD	Pts	Qualification or relegation
1	SC Bümpliz 78	26	14	6	6	46	31	+15	34	Play-off to Nationalliga B
2	FC Solothurn	26	12	8	6	41	25	+16	32	To decider for second place
3	FC Moutier	26	12	8	6	42	35	+7	32	To decider for second place
4	FC Münsingen	26	12	6	8	31	21	+10	30	
5	FC Serrières	26	10	9	7	46	41	+5	29	
6	SV Lyss	26	9	10	7	41	39	+2	28	
7	FC Colombier	26	9	8	9	39	42	−3	26	
8	FC Echallens	26	8	9	9	35	38	−3	25	
9	FC Klus-Balsthal	26	8	6	12	36	40	−4	22	
10	SC Burgdorf	26	7	8	11	34	36	−2	22	
11	FC Lerchenfeld	26	9	4	13	38	51	−13	22	
12	FC Thun	26	6	10	10	29	44	−15	22	Play-out against relegation
13	FC Domdidier	26	6	8	12	28	40	−12	20	Relegation to 2. Liga Interregional
14	FC Bern	26	5	10	11	30	33	−3	20	Relegation to 2. Liga Interregional

Source: RSSSF
Rules for classification: 1) Points; 2) Goal difference within the league, but decider play-off for qualifiers.

==== Decider for second place ====
Played on 2 June 1992 at Stade des Chézards in Colombier.

Team 1	Score	Team 2
FC Solothurn	3–0	FC Moutier

FC Solothurn win and advance to play-offs.

== Group 3 ==
=== Teams ===
Club	Canton	Stadium	Capacity
FC Ascona	Ticino	Stadio Comunale Ascona	1,400
SC Buochs	Nidwalden	Stadion Seefeld	5,000
FC Kölliken	Aargau	Sportstätte Walke	2,000
FC Laufen	Basel-Country	Sportplatz Nau	3,000
FC Mendrisio	Ticino	Centro Sportivo Comunale	4,000
FC Pratteln	Basel-Country	In den Sandgruben	5,000
FC Red Star Zürich	Zürich	Allmend Brunau	2,000
FC Riehen	Basel-City	Sportplatz Grendelmatte	2,500
FC Stabio	Ticino	Campo Montalbano	1,000
FC Suhr	Aargau	Hofstattmatten	2,000
FC Sursee	Lucerne	Stadion Schlottermilch	3,500
FC Tresa/Monteggio	Ticino	Centro Sportivo Passera	1,280
FC Wangen bei Olten	Solothurn	Sportplatz Chrüzmatt	3,000
SC YF Juventus	Zürich	Utogrund	2,850

=== Final league table ===
Pos	Team	Pld	W	D	L	GF	GA	GD	Pts	Qualification or relegation
1	FC Red Star Zürich	26	13	7	6	41	27	+14	33	Play-off to Nationalliga B
2	FC Ascona	26	13	6	7	43	34	+9	32	To decider for second place
3	FC Pratteln	26	12	8	6	40	27	+13	32	To decider for second place
4	SC Young Fellows Juventus	26	11	9	6	40	31	+9	31	
5	FC Sursee	26	10	10	6	38	22	+16	30	
6	FC Mendrisio	26	12	6	8	42	30	+12	30	
7	FC Kölliken	26	11	8	7	39	32	+7	30	
8	SC Buochs	26	9	9	8	31	26	+5	27	
9	FC Laufen	26	10	6	10	27	32	−5	26	
10	FC Riehen	26	8	9	9	42	40	+2	25	
11	FC Tresa/Monteggio	26	4	13	9	20	33	−13	21	
12	FC Suhr	26	6	8	12	26	39	−13	20	Play-out against relegation
13	FC Stabio	26	4	6	16	27	57	−30	14	Relegation to 2. Liga Interregional
14	FC Wangen bei Olten	26	3	7	16	24	50	−26	13	Relegation to 2. Liga Interregional

Source: RSSSF
Rules for classification: 1) Points; 2) Goal difference within the league, but decider play-off for qualifiers.

==== Decider for second place ====
Played on 2 June 1992 at Stadion Schlottermilch in Sursee.

Team 1	Score	Team 2
FC Ascona	3–0	FC Pratteln

FC Ascona win and advance to play-offs.

== Group 4 ==
=== Teams ===
Club	Canton	Stadium	Capacity
FC Altstätten (St. Gallen)	St. Gallen	Grüntal Altstätten	1,000
FC Altstetten (Zürich)	Zürich	Buchlern	1,000
FC Balzers	Liechtenstein	Sportplatz Rheinau	2,000
FC Bülach	Zürich	Stadion Erachfeld	3,500
FC Frauenfeld	Thurgau	Kleine Allmend	6,370
FC Freienbach	Schwyz	Chrummen	4,500
FC Herisau	Appenzell Ausserrhoden	Ebnet	2,000
FC Kreuzlingen	Thurgau	Sportplatz Hafenareal	1,200
FC Rorschach	Schwyz	Sportplatz Kellen	1,000
FC Stäfa	Zürich	Sportanlage Frohberg	1,500
FC Tuggen	Schwyz	Linthstrasse	2,800
SC Veltheim	Aargau	Sportanlage Flüeli	2,000
FC Wil	St. Gallen	Lidl Arena	6,048
FC Zug	Zug	Herti Allmend Stadion	6,000

=== Final league table ===
Pos	Team	Pld	W	D	L	GF	GA	GD	Pts	Qualification or relegation
1	FC Tuggen	26	17	7	2	55	25	+30	41	Play-off to Nationalliga B
2	FC Wil	26	14	7	5	59	32	+27	35	To decider for second place
3	FC Frauenfeld	26	14	7	5	45	24	+21	35	To decider for second place
4	FC Zug	26	11	12	3	41	27	+14	34	
5	FC Altstetten (Zürich)	26	12	8	6	54	36	+18	32	
6	FC Rorschach	26	8	12	6	43	29	+14	28	
7	FC Altstätten (St. Gallen)	26	9	8	9	41	40	+1	26	
8	FC Freienbach	26	8	7	11	49	51	−2	23	
9	FC Stäfa	26	7	9	10	43	46	−3	23	
10	SC Brühl	26	7	9	10	35	39	−4	23	
11	FC Herisau	26	5	12	9	30	33	−3	22	
12	SC Veltheim	26	5	8	13	26	47	−21	18	Play-out against relegation
13	FC Balzers	26	6	5	15	29	63	−34	17	Relegation to 2. Liga Interregional
14	FC Kreuzlingen	26	2	3	21	12	70	−58	7	Relegation to 2. Liga Interregional

Source: RSSSF
Rules for classification: 1) Points; 2) Goal difference within the league, but decider play-off for qualifiers.

==== Decider for second place ====
Played on 2 June 1992 at Paul-Grüninger-Stadion in St. Gallen

Team 1	Score	Team 2
FC Wil	2–1	FC Frauenfeld

FC Wil win and advance to play-offs.

== Promotion play-off ==
=== Qualification round ===
Team 1	Score	Team 2
FC Solothurn	0–0	CS Chênois
CS Chênois	4–0	FC Solothurn

CS Chênois win 4–0 on aggregate and continue to the finals.

Team 1	Score	Team 2
FC Martigny-Sports	1–1	SC Bümpliz 78
SC Bümpliz 78	5–2	FC Martigny-Sports

SC Bümpliz 78 win 6–3 on aggregate and continue to the finals.

Team 1	Score	Team 2
FC Wil	0–0	FC Red Star Zürich
FC Red Star Zürich	0–2	FC Wil

FC Wil win 2–0 on aggregate and continue to the finals.

Team 1	Score	Team 2
FC Ascona	0–3	FC Tuggen
FC Tuggen	4–2	FC Ascona

FC Tuggen win 7–2 on aggregate and continue to the finals.

=== Final round ===
Team 1	Score	Team 2
CS Chênois	1–1	SC Bümpliz 78
SC Bümpliz 78	0–1	CS Chênois

CS Chênois win 1–0 on aggregate and are promoted to 1992–93 Nationalliga B.

Team 1	Score	Team 2
FC Wil	5–1	FC Tuggen
FC Tuggen	0–0	FC Wil

FC Wil win 5–1 on aggregate and are promoted to 1992–93 Nationalliga B.

=== Play-off for third place ===
Team 1	Score	Team 2
SC Bümpliz 78	2–2 a.e.t. 4–1 pen.	FC Tuggen

SC Bümpliz 78 win after penalty shoot-out and are promoted to 1992–93 Nationalliga B.

== Relegation play-out ==
=== First round ===
Team 1	Score	Team 2
FC Thun	1–1 a.e.t. 5–3 pen.	FC Collex-Bossy

FC Collex-Bossy were defeated and continue to the final.

Team 1	Score	Team 2
SC Veltheim	2–1	FC Suhr

FC Suhr were defeated and continue to the final.

=== Final round ===
Team 1	Score	Team 2
FC Collex-Bossy	2–1	FC Suhr
FC Suhr	1–0	FC Collex-Bossy

FC Suhr win on away goals. FC Collex-Bossy are relegated to 2. Liga.

== Further in Swiss football ==
- 1991–92 Nationalliga A
- 1991–92 Nationalliga B
- 1991–92 Swiss Cup

== Sources ==
- Switzerland 1991–92 at RSSSF

Preceded by 1990–91	Seasons in Swiss 1. Liga	Succeeded by 1992–93
