= 1992–93 in Swiss football =

Football in Switzerland
- Season: 1992–93

Men's football
- Nationalliga A: Aarau
- Nationalliga B: No champions declared
- 1. Liga: Group 1: Monthey; Group 2: Serrières; Group 3: Sursee; Group 4: Gossau
- Swiss Cup: Lugano

Women's football
- Swiss Women's Super League: SV Seebach Zürich
- Swiss Cup: SV Seebach Zürich

The following is a summary of the 1992–93 season of competitive football in Switzerland.

== Nationalliga A ==
=== Qualification phase ===
Pos	Team	Pld	W	D	L	GF	GA	GD	Pts	Qualification
1	Young Boys	22	11	6	5	44	30	+14	39	Advance to championship round halved points (rounded up) as bonus
2	Servette	22	10	7	5	32	18	+14	37	Advance to championship round halved points (rounded up) as bonus
3	Sion	22	8	10	4	28	21	+7	34	Advance to championship round halved points (rounded up) as bonus
4	Lausanne-Sport	22	7	10	5	28	21	+7	31	Advance to championship round halved points (rounded up) as bonus
5	Aarau	22	9	6	7	30	34	−4	33	Advance to championship round halved points (rounded up) as bonus
6	Zürich	22	8	7	7	21	22	−1	31	Advance to championship round halved points (rounded up) as bonus
7	Xamax	22	6	10	6	30	26	+4	28	Advance to championship round halved points (rounded up) as bonus
8	Lugano	22	7	8	7	29	28	+1	29	Advance to championship round halved points (rounded up) as bonus
9	Grasshopper Club	22	5	11	6	27	27	0	26	Continue to promotion/relegation round
10	St. Gallen	22	4	10	8	21	28	−7	22	Continue to promotion/relegation round
11	Chiasso	22	5	6	11	15	26	−11	21	Continue to promotion/relegation round
12	Bulle	22	4	5	13	18	42	−24	17	Continue to promotion/relegation round

Source: rsssf.com
Rules for classification: 1) Points; 2) Goal difference; 3) Goals scored; 4) Head-to-head points; 5) Away goals scored; 6) Draw.

=== Championship group ===
The first eight teams of the qualification phase competed in the Championship round. The teams took half of the points (rounded up to complete units) gained in the qualification as bonus with them.

Pos	Team	Pld	W	D	L	GF	GA	GD	BP	Pts	Qualification
1	Aarau	14	9	4	1	21	7	+14	12	34	Swiss champions, qualified for 1993–94 UEFA Champions League preliminary round and entered 1993 Intertoto Cup
2	Young Boys	14	5	4	5	15	15	0	14	28	Qualified for 1993–94 UEFA Cup and entered 1993 Intertoto Cup
3	Servette	14	5	3	6	16	19	−3	14	27	Qualified for 1993–94 UEFA Cup
4	Lugano	14	7	2	5	21	14	+7	11	27	Swiss Cup winners, qualified for 1993–94 UEFA Cup Winners' Cup
5	Zürich	14	5	4	5	13	14	−1	12	26	Entered 1993 Intertoto Cup
6	Sion	14	4	3	7	17	22	−5	13	24	
7	Xamax	14	4	5	5	16	16	0	11	24	
8	Lausanne-Sport	14	3	3	8	11	23	−12	12	21	Entered 1993 Intertoto Cup

Source: rsssf.com
Rules for classification: 1) points; 2) Position in the qualification.

== Nationalliga B ==
=== Qualification phase ===
Group East

Pos	Team	Pld	W	D	L	GF	GA	GD	Pts	Qualification
1	FC Luzern	22	13	7	2	41	12	+29	33	Promotion round
2	FC Winterthur	22	13	6	3	46	21	+25	32	Promotion round
3	FC Locarno	22	10	10	2	38	22	+16	30	Promotion round
4	FC Schaffhausen	22	11	7	4	38	23	+15	29	Promotion round
5	FC Wil	22	9	8	5	32	19	+13	26	Promotion round
6	SC Kriens	22	9	7	6	39	26	+13	25	Promotion round
7	FC Baden	22	7	9	6	27	28	−1	23	Relegation round
8	AC Bellinzona	22	3	8	11	28	44	−16	14	Relegation round
9	FC Chur	22	3	8	11	23	44	−21	14	Relegation round
10	FC Wettingen	22	5	3	14	18	39	−21	13	Relegation round
11	FC Emmenbrücke	22	4	5	13	20	42	−22	13	Relegation round
12	FC Brüttisellen	22	5	2	15	23	53	−30	12	Relegation round

Source: rsssf.com
Rules for classification: 1) Points; 2) Goal difference; 3) Goals scored; 4) Head-to-head points; 5) Away goals scored; 6) Draw.

Group West

Pos	Team	Pld	W	D	L	GF	GA	GD	Pts	Qualification
1	Yverdon-Sport FC	22	17	3	2	60	24	+36	37	Promotion round
2	FC Basel	22	16	4	2	54	10	+44	36	Promotion round
3	Etoile Carouge FC	22	14	0	8	48	32	+16	28	Promotion round
4	CS Chênois	22	12	2	8	37	39	−2	26	Promotion round
5	FC Grenchen	22	11	3	8	40	25	+15	25	Promotion round
6	SR Delémont	22	8	5	9	31	33	−2	21	Promotion round
7	Urania Genève Sport	22	7	4	11	33	43	−10	18	Relegation round
8	BSC Old Boys	22	5	7	10	27	39	−12	17	Relegation round
9	FC Fribourg	22	7	3	12	29	42	−13	17	Relegation round
10	SC Bümpliz 78	22	5	5	12	26	52	−26	15	Relegation round
11	FC Châtel-St-Denis	22	2	8	12	25	47	−22	12	Relegation round
12	FC La Chaux-de-Fonds	22	4	4	14	25	49	−24	12	Relegation round

Source: rsssf.com
Rules for classification: 1) Points; 2) Goal difference; 3) Goals scored; 4) Head-to-head points; 5) Away goals scored; 6) Draw.

=== Promotion/relegation round NLA/NLB ===
Group A

Pos	Team	Pld	W	D	L	GF	GA	GD	Pts	Qualification
1	Grasshopper Club Zürich	14	10	2	2	42	8	+34	22	Remain in NLA 1993–94
2	FC Luzern	14	10	2	2	30	6	+24	22	Promoted to NLA 1993–94
3	FC Bulle	14	8	3	3	28	20	+8	19	Relegation to NLB 1993–94
4	FC Basel	14	7	4	3	25	17	+8	18	Remain in NLB 1993–94
5	SR Delémont	14	4	2	8	14	28	−14	10	Remain in NLB 1993–94
6	CS Chênois	14	4	1	9	9	29	−20	9	Remain in NLB 1993–94
7	FC Locarno	14	3	1	10	16	31	−15	7	Remain in NLB 1993–94
8	FC Wil	14	1	3	10	7	32	−25	5	Remain in NLB 1993–94

Source: rsssf.com
Rules for classification: 1) Points; 2) Goal difference; 3) Goals scored; 4) Head-to-head points; 5) Away goals scored; 6) Draw.

Group B

Pos	Team	Pld	W	D	L	GF	GA	GD	Pts	Qualification
1	Yverdon-Sport FC	14	9	3	2	32	21	+11	21	Promoted to NLA 1993–94
2	SC Kriens	14	9	3	2	22	15	+7	21	Promoted to NLA 1993–94
3	FC St. Gallen	14	10	0	4	34	12	+22	20	Relegation to NLB 1993–94
4	FC Schaffhausen	14	8	1	5	22	16	+6	17	Remain in NLB 1993–94
5	FC Chiasso	14	7	2	5	22	15	+7	16	Relegation to NLB 1993–94
6	FC Winterthur	14	2	3	9	12	28	−16	7	Remain in NLB 1993–94
7	Étoile Carouge FC	14	3	0	11	14	33	−19	6	Remain in NLB 1993–94
8	FC Grenchen	14	1	2	11	8	26	−18	4	Remain in NLB 1993–94

Source: rsssf.com
Rules for classification: 1) Points; 2) Goal difference; 3) Goals scored; 4) Head-to-head points; 5) Away goals scored; 6) Draw.

=== Relegation round NLB/1. Liga ===
The last six teams in each of the two qualification phase groups competed in two relegation groups against relegation to the 1. Liga 1993–94. The teams received ranking bonus points from their qualifying groups (7th place 6 pts; 8th place 5 pts; 9th place 4 pts; etc). There were to be three direct relegations in each group and a play-out against relegation between the two third placed teams.

Group A

Pos	Team	Pld	W	D	L	GF	GA	GD	BP	Pts	Qualification
1	AC Bellinzona	10	6	3	1	20	9	+11	5	20	Remain in NLB 1993–94
2	FC Fribourg	10	5	3	2	16	13	+3	4	17	Remain in NLB 1993–94
3	Urania Genève Sport	10	4	3	3	15	17	−2	6	17	Play-out against relegation
4	FC Wettingen	10	6	0	4	20	13	+7	3	15	Relegation to 1. Liga 1993–94
5	FC Châtel-Saint-Denis	10	2	1	7	14	24	−10	2	7	Relegation to 1. Liga 1993–94
6	FC Brüttisellen	10	0	4	6	8	17	−9	1	5	Relegation to 1. Liga 1993–94

Source: rsssf.com
Rules for classification: 1) Points; 2) Goal difference; 3) Goals scored; 4) Head-to-head points; 5) Away goals scored; 6) Draw.

Group B

Pos	Team	Pld	W	D	L	GF	GA	GD	BP	Pts	Qualification
1	BSC Old Boys	10	8	0	2	32	15	+17	5	21	Remain in NLB 1993–94
2	FC Baden	10	4	3	3	23	26	−3	6	17	Remain in NLB 1993–94
3	SC Bümpliz 78	10	4	2	4	14	14	0	3	13	Play-out against relegation
4	FC Emmenbrücke	10	4	1	5	17	18	−1	2	11	Relegation to 1. Liga 1993–94
5	FC Chur	10	2	2	6	14	21	−7	4	10	Relegation to 1. Liga 1993–94
6	FC La Chaux-de-Fonds	10	2	4	4	7	13	−6	1	9	Relegation to 1. Liga 1993–94

Source: rsssf.com
Rules for classification: 1) Points; 2) Goal difference; 3) Goals scored; 4) Head-to-head points; 5) Away goals scored; 6) Draw.

=== Relegation play-out ===
Team 1	Score	Team 2
Urania Genève Sport	2–0	SC Bümpliz 78
SC Bümpliz 78	1–4	Urania Genève Sport

Urania Genève Sport win 6–1 on aggregate. SC Bümpliz 78 are relegated to 1. Liga 1993–94.

== 1. Liga ==
=== Group 1 ===
Pos	Team	Pld	W	D	L	GF	GA	GD	Pts	Qualification or relegation
1	FC Monthey	26	15	6	5	55	31	+24	36	Play-off to Nationalliga B
2	FC Renens	26	13	8	5	49	33	+16	34	Play-off to Nationalliga B
3	FC Stade Lausanne	26	11	9	6	43	25	+18	31	
4	FC Naters	26	12	6	8	46	37	+9	30	
5	FC Echallens	26	14	2	10	45	39	+6	30	
6	Grand-Lancy FC	26	11	6	9	45	35	+10	28	
7	FC Montreux-Sports	26	11	5	10	49	42	+7	27	
8	FC Raron	26	9	9	8	38	33	+5	27	
9	Vevey Sports	26	9	9	8	39	37	+2	27	
10	FC Martigny-Sports	26	10	6	10	49	40	+9	26	
11	FC Fully	26	8	7	11	43	48	−5	23	
12	FC Versoix	26	5	12	9	26	29	−3	22	Play-out against relegation
13	FC Savièse	26	6	8	12	42	51	−9	20	Relegation to 2. Liga Interregional
14	ES FC Malley	26	1	1	24	20	109	−89	3	Relegation to 2. Liga Interregional

Source: RSSSF
Rules for classification: 1) Points; 2) Goal difference; 3) Goals scored; 4) Play-off.

=== Group 2 ===
Pos	Team	Pld	W	D	L	GF	GA	GD	Pts	Qualification or relegation
1	FC Serrières	26	16	7	3	48	20	+28	39	Play-off to Nationalliga B
2	FC Moutier	26	16	3	7	58	33	+25	35	Play-off to Nationalliga B
3	SV Lyss	26	14	6	6	52	32	+20	34	
4	FC Münsingen	26	12	8	6	39	25	+14	32	
5	FC Riehen	26	12	8	6	38	34	+4	32	
6	FC Colombier	26	14	3	9	50	33	+17	31	
7	FC Concordia Basel	26	10	6	10	39	39	0	26	
8	FC Laufen	26	7	9	10	26	33	−7	23	
9	FC Le Locle	26	8	7	11	33	47	−14	23	
10	FC Pratteln	26	6	10	10	26	44	−18	22	
11	FC Thun	26	5	9	12	41	50	−9	19	
12	SC Burgdorf	26	6	7	13	31	52	−21	19	Play-out against relegation
13	FC Lerchenfeld	26	5	6	15	38	50	−12	16	Relegation to 2. Liga Interregional
14	FC Dürrenast	26	3	7	16	33	61	−28	13	Relegation to 2. Liga Interregional

Source: RSSSF
Rules for classification: 1) Points; 2) Goal difference; 3) Goals scored; 4) Play-off.

=== Group 3 ===
Pos	Team	Pld	W	D	L	GF	GA	GD	Pts	Qualification or relegation
1	FC Sursee	26	17	7	2	73	28	+45	41	Play-off to Nationalliga B
2	FC Solothurn	26	17	4	5	66	32	+34	38	Play-off to Nationalliga B
3	FC Suhr	26	11	7	8	36	38	−2	29	
4	FC Ascona	26	11	6	9	46	34	+12	28	
5	FC Mendrisio	26	11	6	9	36	29	+7	28	
6	FC Zug	26	10	7	9	42	39	+3	27	
7	FC Tresa/Monteggio	26	11	4	11	36	47	−11	26	
8	FC Klus-Balsthal	26	10	4	12	33	38	−5	24	
9	SC Buochs	26	8	7	11	39	45	−6	23	
10	FC Muri	26	10	2	14	45	49	−4	22	
11	FC Kölliken	26	8	5	13	35	39	−4	21	
12	FC Freienbach	26	7	7	12	43	49	−6	21	Play-out against relegation
13	SC Zug	26	6	6	14	27	51	−24	18	Relegation to 2. Liga Interregional
14	FC Morbio	26	5	8	13	30	69	−39	18	Relegation to 2. Liga Interregional

Source: RSSSF
Rules for classification: 1) Points; 2) Goal difference; 3) Goals scored; 4) Play-off.

=== Group 4 ===
Pos	Team	Pld	W	D	L	GF	GA	GD	Pts	Qualification or relegation
1	FC Gossau	26	19	6	1	63	17	+46	44	Play-off to Nationalliga B
2	FC Red Star Zürich	26	14	7	5	46	27	+19	35	Play-off to Nationalliga B
3	FC Tuggen	26	12	8	6	47	30	+17	32	
4	FC Altstetten (Zürich)	26	8	13	5	50	39	+11	29	
5	FC Rorschach	26	10	9	7	28	28	0	29	
6	SC Brühl	26	11	5	10	44	38	+6	27	
7	SC Young Fellows Juventus	26	7	12	7	37	31	+6	26	
8	FC Wiedikon	26	7	11	8	34	35	−1	25	
9	FC Frauenfeld	26	7	9	10	35	40	−5	23	
10	FC Altstätten (St. Gallen)	26	5	10	11	36	45	−9	20	
11	FC Stäfa	26	6	8	12	32	52	−20	20	
12	FC Glarus	26	7	6	13	37	60	−23	20	Play-out against relegation
13	SC Veltheim	26	4	9	13	23	44	−21	17	Relegation to 2. Liga Interregional
14	FC Herisau	26	4	9	13	25	51	−26	17	Relegation to 2. Liga Interregional

Source: RSSSF
Rules for classification: 1) Points; 2) Goal difference; 3) Goals scored; 4) Play-off.

=== Promotion play-off ===
Qualification round

Team 1	Score	Team 2
FC Solothurn	0–0	FC Gossau
FC Gossau	4–1	FC Solothurn

FC Gossau win 4–1 on aggregate and continue to the finals.

Team 1	Score	Team 2
FC Moutier	1–4	FC Monthey
FC Monthey	6–0	FC Moutier

FC Monthey win 10–1 on aggregate and continue to the finals.

Team 1	Score	Team 2
FC Renens	4–1	FC Serrières
FC Serrières	2–4	FC Renens

FC Renens win 8–3 on aggregate and continue to the finals.

Team 1	Score	Team 2
FC Red Star Zürich	1–4	FC Sursee
FC Sursee	3–2	FC Red Star Zürich

FC Sursee win 7–3 on aggregate and continue to the finals.

Final round

Team 1	Score	Team 2
FC Gossau	1–1	FC Monthey
FC Monthey	1–1	FC Gossau

2–2 on aggregate, FC Gossau win 7–6 on penalties and are promoted to 1993–94 Nationalliga B.

Team 1	Score	Team 2
FC Renens	1–2	FC Sursee
FC Sursee	0–0	FC Renens

FC Sursee win 2–1 on aggregate and are promoted to 1993–94 Nationalliga B.

Decider for promotion

Team 1	Score	Team 2
FC Monthey	2–1	FC Renens

FC Monthey win and are promoted to 1993–94 Nationalliga B.

=== Relegation play-out ===
First round

Team 1	Score	Team 2
FC Freienbach	2–1	FC Glarus

FC Glarus continue to the final.

Team 1	Score	Team 2
FC Versoix	4–0	SC Burgdorf

SC Burgdorf continue to the final.

Final round

Team 1	Score	Team 2
SC Burgdorf	0–2	FC Glarus
FC Glarus	2–2	SC Burgdorf

FC Glarus win 4–2 on aggregate and remain in 1993–94 1. Liga. SC Burgdorf are relegated to 2. Liga.

== Swiss Cup ==
The routes of the finalists to the final, played on 31 May 1993 at the Wankdorf in Bern:

=== Early rounds ===
Round 3

Team 1	Score	Team 2
3 October 1992
FC Rorschach	1–7	Grasshoppers
4 October 1992
FC Gunzwil	2–7	FC Lugano

Round 4

Team 1	Score	Team 2
21 March 1993
FC Aarau	1–2	Grasshoppers
FC Gossau	1–3	FC Lugano

Round 5

Team 1	Score	Team 2
6 April 1993
FC Fribourg	0–4	Grasshoppers
BSC Young Boys	1–1 (a.e.t.) (p. 4–5)	FC Lugano

Quarter-finals

Team 1	Score	Team 2
20 April 1993
SC Kriens	2–3	Grasshoppers
FC Lugano	4–2	FC Zürich

Semi-finals

Team 1	Score	Team 2
4 May 1993
Neuchâtel Xamax FC	2–3 (a.e.t.)	FC Lugano
Servette FC	0–2	Grasshoppers

=== Final ===
31 May 1993
15:00

FC Lugano	4 – 1	Grasshoppers
Andrioli 14'; Subiat 41', 72'; Fornera 89'	Report	61' Élber

Wankdorf, Bern
Attendance: 20,000
Referee: (Switzerland) Gottfried Friedrich (Seedorf)

== Swiss Clubs in Europe ==
- Sion as 1991–92 Nationalliga A champions: 1992–93 UEFA Champions League first round
- Luzern as 1991–92 Swiss Cup winners: 1992–93 Cup Winners' Cup first round
- Xamax as league second placed team: 1992–93 UEFA Cup
- Grasshopper Club as league third placed team: 1992–93 UEFA Cup and entered 1992 Intertoto Cup
- Young Boys entered 1992 Intertoto Cup
- Lausanne Sports entered 1992 Intertoto Cup
- St. Gallen entered 1992 Intertoto Cup
- Vaduz as 1991–92 Liechtenstein Cup winners: 1992–93 Cup Winners' Cup qualifying round

=== Sion ===
==== Champions League ====
===== First round =====
16 September 1992 First leg	Sion (Switzerland)	4–1	(Ukraine) Tavriya Simferopol	Stade de Tourbillon, Sion
20:00	Hottiger 17'; Túlio 35', 73'; Assis 77'	Report	Shevchenko 85' (pen.)	Attendance: 6,000; Referee: Léon Schelings (Belgium)

30 September 1992 Second leg	Tavriya Simferopol (Ukraine)	1–3	(Switzerland) Sion	Lokomotiv Stadium, Simferopol
19:00	Shevchenko 69' (pen.)	Report	Túlio 67', 77'; Herr 89'	Attendance: 9,400; Referee: Christer Fällström (Sweden)

Sion won 7–2 on aggregate.

===== Second round =====
21 October 1992 First leg	Sion (Switzerland)	2–2	(Portugal) Porto	Stade de Tourbillon, Sion
20:30	Orlando 55'; Assis 60'	Report	Semedo 80'; F. Couto 83'	Attendance: 13,200; Referee: John Blankenstein (Netherlands)

4 November 1992 Second leg	Porto (Portugal)	4–0	(Switzerland) Sion	Estádio das Antas, Porto
21:30	Jorge Costa 50'; Kostadinov 63'; Domingos 85'; Magalhães 87'	Report		Attendance: 20,000; Referee: Brian Hill (England)

Porto won 6–2 on aggregate.

=== Luzern ===
==== Cup Winners' Cup ====
===== First round =====
16 September 1992 First leg	Levski Sofia (Bulgaria)	2–1	(Switzerland) Luzern	Stadion Georgi Asparuhov, Sofia
17:00	Borimirov 53'; Getov 70' (pen.)	Report	Camenzind 9'	Attendance: 15,000; Referee: Václav Krondl (Czechoslovakia)

30 September 1992 Second leg	Luzern (Switzerland)	1–0	(Bulgaria) Levski Sofia	Stadion Allmend, Lucerne
20:00	Camenzind 24'	Report		Attendance: 12,000; Referee: Joaquín Urío Velázquez (Spain)

2–2 on aggregate. Luzern won on away goals.

===== Second round =====
21 October 1992 First leg	Luzern (Switzerland)	1–0	(Netherlands) Feyenoord	Stadion Allmend, Lucerne
17:45	Rueda 75'	Report		Attendance: 11,700; Referee: Loizos Loizou (Cyprus)

4 November 1992 Second leg	Feyenoord (Netherlands)	4–1	(Switzerland) Luzern	De Kuip, Rotterdam
20:00	Taument 2'; Blinker 16'; Kiprich 55', 83' (pen.)	Report	Nadig 12'	Attendance: 27,231; Referee: Alan Snoddy (Northern Ireland)

Feyenoord won 4–2 on aggregate.

=== Xamax ===
==== UEFA Cup ====
===== First round =====
15 September 1992 First leg	Neuchâtel Xamax (Switzerland)	2–2	(Denmark) BK Frem	Stade de la Maladière, Neuchâtel
20:00	Sutter 51'; Manfreda 52'	Report	Mikkelsen 17'; Czakon 22'	Attendance: 4,000; Referee: Marc Batta (France)

29 September 1992 Second leg	BK Frem (Denmark)	4–1	(Switzerland) Neuchâtel Xamax	Valby Idrætspark, Copenhagen
19:00	Haren 15', 33'; H. Jensen 17' (pen.); Thøgersen 54'	Report	Manfreda 22'	Attendance: 3,476; Referee: Marnix Sandra (Belgium)

BK Frem won 6–3 on aggregate.

=== Grasshopper Club ===
==== UEFA Cup ====
===== First round =====
16 September 1992 First leg	Grasshopper (Switzerland)	1–2	(Portugal) Sporting CP	Hardturm, Zürich
20:00	Sutter 36' (pen.)	Report	Balakov 44'; Juskowiak 83'	Attendance: 13,700; Referee: Philippe Leduc (France)

30 September 1992 Second leg	Sporting CP (Portugal)	1–3 (a.e.t.)	(Switzerland) Grasshopper	Estádio José Alvalade, Lisbon
22:30	Cadete 84'	Report	Élber 31', 110'; Magnin 83'	Attendance: 35,000; Referee: Hellmut Krug (Germany)

Grasshopper won 4–3 on aggregate.

===== Second round =====
21 October 1992 First leg	Roma (Italy)	3–0	(Switzerland) Grasshopper	Stadio Olimpico, Rome
19:00	Carnevale 18'; Rizzitelli 25'; Giannini 42'	Report		Attendance: 31,034; Referee: Heinz Holzmann (Austria)

4 November 1992 Second leg	Grasshopper (Switzerland)	4–3	(Italy) Roma	Hardturm, Zürich
19:15	de Vicente 36' (pen.), 68'; Sutter 49'; Gämperle 58'	Report	Rizzitelli 7', 90'; Caniggia 30'	Attendance: 15,100; Referee: Frans Van Den Wijngaert (Belgium)

Roma won 6–4 on aggregate.

==== Intertoto Cup ====
===== Group 1 =====
Pos	Team	Pld	W	D	L	GF	GA	GD	Pts
1	(Denmark) Copenhagen	6	4	1	1	14	8	+6	9
2	(Czech Republic) Sigma Olomouc	6	2	2	2	9	8	+1	6
3	(Austria) Admira Wacker	6	2	1	3	10	14	−4	5
4	(Switzerland) Grasshopper Club	6	1	2	3	9	12	−3	4

Source: Pawel Mogielnicki's Page

=== Young Boys ===
==== Intertoto Cup ====
===== Group 4 =====
Pos	Team	Pld	W	D	L	GF	GA	GD	Pts
1	(Germany) Karlsruher SC	6	2	3	1	12	9	+3	7
2	(Switzerland) Young Boys	6	2	2	2	13	12	+1	6
3	(Sweden) Halmstads BK	6	3	0	3	11	13	−2	6
4	Austria Salzburg	6	2	1	3	12	14	−2	5

Source: Pawel Mogielnicki's Page

=== St. Gallen ===
==== Intertoto Cup ====
===== Group 3 =====
Pos	Team	Pld	W	D	L	GF	GA	GD	Pts
1	(Germany) Bayer Uerdingen	6	5	0	1	8	4	+4	10
2	(Sweden) Häcken	6	2	2	2	12	8	+4	6
3	(Switzerland) St. Gallen	6	1	2	3	8	10	−2	4
4	(Austria) Stahl Linz	6	1	2	3	7	13	−6	4

Source: Pawel Mogielnicki's Page

=== Lausanne-Sports ===
==== Intertoto Cup ====
===== Group 2 =====
Pos	Team	Pld	W	D	L	GF	GA	GD	Pts
1	(Hungary) Siófok	6	3	2	1	9	6	+3	8
2	(Czech Republic) Sparta Prague	6	3	2	1	9	7	+2	8
3	(Austria) Vorwärts Steyr	6	2	1	3	8	10	−2	5
4	(Switzerland) Lausanne-Sport	6	1	1	4	4	7	−3	3

Source: Pawel Mogielnicki's Page

=== Vaduz ===
==== Cup Winners' Cup ====
===== Qualifying round =====
19 August 1992 First leg	Vaduz (Liechtenstein)	0–5	(Ukraine) Chornomorets Odesa	Gemeindesportplatz, Vaduz
16:30		Report	Tsymbalar 45'; Lebed 47'; Sak 52'; Husyev 80', 82'	Attendance: 1,650; Referee: Ernest Kesseler (Luxembourg)

2 September 1992 Second leg	Chornomorets Odesa (Ukraine)	7–1	(Liechtenstein) Vaduz	Central Stadium Chornomorets, Odesa
14:00	Y. Nikiforov 9', 49' (pen.), 78', 90'; Yablonskyi 23'; Tsymbalar 27'; Lebed 77'	Report	Stöber 87'	Attendance: 4,600; Referee: Jozef Marko (Czechoslovakia)

Chornomorets Odesa won 12–1 on aggregate.

== Sources ==
- Switzerland 1992–93 at RSSSF
- Cup finals at Fussball-Schweiz
- Intertoto history at Pawel Mogielnicki's Page
- Josef Zindel (2018). FC Basel 1893. Die ersten 125 Jahre (in German). Basel: Friedrich Reinhardt Verlag. ISBN 978-3-7245-2305-5.

Preceded by 1991–92	Seasons in Swiss football	Succeeded by 1993–94
