= 1991–92 in Swiss football =

Football in Switzerland
- Season: 1991–92

Men's football
- Nationalliga A: Sion
- Nationalliga B: No champions declared
- 1. Liga: Group 1: Chênois; Group 2: Bümpliz; Group 3: Red Star; Group 4: FC Tuggen
- Swiss Cup: Luzern

Women's football
- Swiss Women's Super League: DFC Bern
- Swiss Cup: FC Schwerzenbach

The following is a summary of the 1991–92 season of competitive football in Switzerland.

== Nationalliga A ==
=== Qualification phase ===
| Pos | Team | Pld | W | D | L | GF | GA | GD | Pts | Qualification |
|---|---|---|---|---|---|---|---|---|---|---|
| 1 | Lausanne-Sport | 22 | 10 | 10 | 2 | 42 | 17 | +25 | 30 | Advance to championship round halved points (rounded up) as bonus |
| 2 | Grasshopper Club | 22 | 12 | 5 | 5 | 39 | 24 | +15 | 29 | Advance to championship round halved points (rounded up) as bonus |
| 3 | Sion | 22 | 9 | 10 | 3 | 34 | 20 | +14 | 28 | Advance to championship round halved points (rounded up) as bonus |
| 4 | Servette | 22 | 10 | 7 | 5 | 37 | 28 | +9 | 27 | Advance to championship round halved points (rounded up) as bonus |
| 5 | Xamax | 22 | 9 | 6 | 7 | 28 | 22 | +6 | 24 | Advance to championship round halved points (rounded up) as bonus |
| 6 | St. Gallen | 22 | 8 | 6 | 8 | 27 | 32 | −5 | 22 | Advance to championship round halved points (rounded up) as bonus |
| 7 | Young Boys | 22 | 8 | 5 | 9 | 30 | 30 | 0 | 21 | Advance to championship round halved points (rounded up) as bonus |
| 8 | Zürich | 22 | 4 | 12 | 6 | 22 | 25 | −3 | 20 | Advance to championship round halved points (rounded up) as bonus |
| 9 | Luzern | 22 | 5 | 10 | 7 | 21 | 26 | −5 | 20 | Continue to promotion/relegation round |
| 10 | Lugano | 22 | 6 | 8 | 8 | 25 | 36 | −11 | 20 | Continue to promotion/relegation round |
| 11 | Aarau | 22 | 3 | 8 | 11 | 21 | 39 | −18 | 14 | Continue to promotion/relegation round |
| 12 | Wettingen | 22 | 1 | 7 | 14 | 18 | 45 | −27 | 9 | Continue to promotion/relegation round |

Source: rsssf.com
Rules for classification: 1) Points; 2) Goal difference; 3) Goals scored; 4) Head-to-head points; 5) Away goals scored; 6) Draw.

=== Championship group ===
The first eight teams of the qualification phase competed in the Championship round. The teams took half of the points (rounded up to complete units) gained in the qualification as bonus with them.

| Pos | Team | Pld | W | D | L | GF | GA | GD | BP | Pts | Qualification |
|---|---|---|---|---|---|---|---|---|---|---|---|
| 1 | Sion | 14 | 7 | 5 | 2 | 23 | 16 | +7 | 14 | 33 | Swiss champions, qualified for 1992–93 UEFA Champions League |
| 2 | Xamax | 14 | 7 | 5 | 2 | 27 | 16 | +11 | 12 | 31 | Qualified for 1992–93 UEFA Cup |
| 3 | Grasshopper Club | 14 | 6 | 3 | 5 | 18 | 14 | +4 | 15 | 30 | Qualified for 1992–93 UEFA Cup and entered 1992 Intertoto Cup |
| 4 | Young Boys | 14 | 7 | 3 | 4 | 24 | 16 | +8 | 11 | 28 | Entered 1992 Intertoto Cup |
| 5 | Servette | 14 | 4 | 5 | 5 | 23 | 22 | +1 | 14 | 27 | |
| 6 | Lausanne Sports | 14 | 2 | 4 | 8 | 11 | 22 | −11 | 15 | 23 | Entered 1992 Intertoto Cup |
| 7 | Zürich | 14 | 3 | 6 | 5 | 17 | 27 | −10 | 10 | 22 | |
| 8 | St. Gallen | 14 | 3 | 3 | 8 | 18 | 28 | −10 | 11 | 20 | Entered 1992 Intertoto Cup |

Source: rsssf.com
Rules for classification: 1) points; 2) Position in the qualification.

== Nationalliga B ==
=== Qualification phase ===
Group East

| Pos | Team | Pld | W | D | L | GF | GA | GD | Pts | Qualification |
|---|---|---|---|---|---|---|---|---|---|---|
| 1 | FC Schaffhausen | 22 | 11 | 8 | 3 | 54 | 20 | +34 | 30 | Promotion round |
| 2 | FC Baden | 22 | 12 | 5 | 5 | 36 | 22 | +14 | 29 | Promotion round |
| 3 | FC Chiasso | 22 | 10 | 7 | 5 | 47 | 22 | +25 | 27 | Promotion round |
| 4 | AC Bellinzona | 22 | 9 | 8 | 5 | 43 | 24 | +19 | 26 | Promotion round |
| 5 | FC Chur | 22 | 10 | 6 | 6 | 30 | 22 | +8 | 26 | Promotion round |
| 6 | FC Locarno | 22 | 8 | 9 | 5 | 29 | 20 | +9 | 25 | Promotion round |
| 7 | FC Winterthur | 22 | 9 | 5 | 8 | 37 | 32 | +5 | 23 | Relegation round |
| 8 | SC Zug | 22 | 9 | 3 | 10 | 28 | 39 | −11 | 21 | Relegation round |
| 9 | FC Brüttisellen | 22 | 6 | 7 | 9 | 22 | 38 | −16 | 19 | Relegation round |
| 10 | SC Kriens | 22 | 6 | 5 | 11 | 23 | 36 | −13 | 17 | Relegation round |
| 11 | FC Glarus | 22 | 4 | 3 | 15 | 16 | 60 | −44 | 11 | Relegation round |
| 12 | FC Emmenbrücke | 22 | 4 | 2 | 16 | 18 | 48 | −30 | 10 | Relegation round |

Source: rsssf.com
Rules for classification: 1) Points; 2) Goal difference; 3) Goals scored; 4) Head-to-head points; 5) Away goals scored; 6) Draw.

Group West

| Pos | Team | Pld | W | D | L | GF | GA | GD | Pts | Qualification |
|---|---|---|---|---|---|---|---|---|---|---|
| 1 | FC Basel | 22 | 13 | 5 | 4 | 42 | 30 | +12 | 31 | Promotion round |
| 2 | FC Grenchen | 22 | 10 | 7 | 5 | 40 | 27 | +13 | 27 | Promotion round |
| 3 | Yverdon-Sport FC | 22 | 11 | 5 | 6 | 47 | 34 | +13 | 27 | Promotion round |
| 4 | FC Bulle | 22 | 9 | 8 | 5 | 45 | 29 | +16 | 26 | Promotion round |
| 5 | ES FC Malley | 22 | 11 | 4 | 7 | 36 | 30 | +6 | 26 | Promotion round |
| 6 | FC La Chaux-de-Fonds | 22 | 8 | 9 | 5 | 33 | 23 | +10 | 25 | Promotion round |
| 7 | BSC Old Boys | 22 | 9 | 5 | 8 | 38 | 26 | +12 | 23 | Relegation round |
| 8 | Urania Genève Sport | 22 | 9 | 5 | 8 | 37 | 33 | +4 | 23 | Relegation round |
| 9 | FC Fribourg | 22 | 8 | 4 | 10 | 35 | 37 | −2 | 20 | Relegation round |
| 10 | Étoile Carouge FC | 22 | 5 | 5 | 12 | 33 | 56 | −23 | 15 | Relegation round |
| 11 | FC Châtel-Saint-Denis | 22 | 5 | 4 | 13 | 22 | 45 | −23 | 14 | Relegation round |
| 12 | SR Delémont | 22 | 2 | 3 | 17 | 22 | 60 | −38 | 7 | Relegation round |

Source: rsssf.com
Rules for classification: 1) Points; 2) Goal difference; 3) Goals scored; 4) Head-to-head points; 5) Away goals scored; 6) Draw.

=== Promotion/relegation round NLA/NLB ===
Group A

| Pos | Team | Pld | W | D | L | GF | GA | GD | Pts | Qualification |
|---|---|---|---|---|---|---|---|---|---|---|
| 1 | Lugano | 14 | 8 | 6 | 0 | 25 | 8 | +17 | 22 | Remain in Nationalliga A 1992–93 |
| 2 | Aarau | 14 | 7 | 5 | 2 | 20 | 13 | +7 | 19 | Remain in Nationalliga A 1992–93 |
| 3 | Yverdon-Sports | 14 | 6 | 6 | 2 | 24 | 17 | +7 | 18 | Remain in Nationalliga B 1992–93 |
| 4 | Basel | 14 | 4 | 6 | 4 | 20 | 22 | −2 | 14 | Remain in Nationalliga B 1992–93 |
| 5 | Baden | 14 | 2 | 9 | 3 | 14 | 16 | −2 | 13 | Remain in Nationalliga B 1992–93 |
| 6 | Locarno | 14 | 3 | 4 | 7 | 19 | 19 | 0 | 10 | Remain in Nationalliga B 1992–93 |
| 7 | ES Malley | 14 | 3 | 4 | 7 | 18 | 30 | −12 | 10 | License revoked Relegated to 1992–93 1. Liga |
| 8 | Bellinzona | 14 | 2 | 2 | 10 | 14 | 29 | −15 | 6 | Remain in Nationalliga B 1992–93 |

Source: rsssf.com
Rules for classification: 1) Points; 2) Goal difference; 3) Goals scored; 4) Head-to-head points; 5) Away goals scored; 6) Draw.

Group B

| Pos | Team | Pld | W | D | L | GF | GA | GD | Pts | Qualification |
|---|---|---|---|---|---|---|---|---|---|---|
| 1 | Chiasso | 14 | 8 | 4 | 2 | 28 | 16 | +12 | 20 | Remain in Nationalliga A 1992–93 |
| 2 | Bulle | 14 | 8 | 3 | 3 | 29 | 17 | +12 | 19 | Remain in Nationalliga A 1992–93 |
| 3 | FC Schaffhausen | 14 | 8 | 3 | 3 | 24 | 14 | +10 | 19 | Remain in Nationalliga B 1992–93 |
| 4 | Luzern | 14 | 8 | 3 | 3 | 24 | 14 | +10 | 19 | Remain in Nationalliga B 1992–93 |
| 5 | Wettingen | 14 | 6 | 1 | 7 | 20 | 24 | −4 | 13 | Remain in Nationalliga B 1992–93 |
| 6 | Grenchen | 14 | 3 | 5 | 6 | 18 | 28 | −10 | 11 | Remain in Nationalliga B 1992–93 |
| 7 | La Chaux-de-Fonds | 14 | 2 | 2 | 10 | 21 | 31 | −10 | 6 | Remain in Nationalliga B 1992–93 |
| 8 | Chur | 14 | 1 | 3 | 10 | 13 | 33 | −20 | 5 | Remain in Nationalliga B 1992–93 |

Source: rsssf.com
Rules for classification: 1) Points; 2) Goal difference; 3) Goals scored; 4) Head-to-head points; 5) Away goals scored; 6) Draw.

=== Relegation round NLB/1. Liga ===
The last six teams in each of the two qualification phase groups competed in two relegation groups against relegation to the 1. Liga 1992–93. The teams received ranking bonus points from their qualifying groups (7th place 6 pts; 8th place 5 pts; 9th place 4 pts; etc). There was to be one direct relegation in each group, plus a play-out against relegation between both second last placed teams.

Group A

| Pos | Team | Pld | W | D | L | GF | GA | GD | BP | Pts | Qualification |
|---|---|---|---|---|---|---|---|---|---|---|---|
| 1 | FC Fribourg | 10 | 6 | 3 | 1 | 22 | 6 | +16 | 4 | 19 | Remain in NLB 1993–94 |
| 2 | SC Kriens | 10 | 4 | 6 | 0 | 13 | 4 | +9 | 3 | 17 | Remain in NLB 1993–94 |
| 3 | BSC Old Boys | 10 | 3 | 4 | 3 | 12 | 15 | −3 | 6 | 16 | Remain in NLB 1993–94 |
| 4 | SC Zug | 10 | 3 | 2 | 5 | 9 | 14 | −5 | 5 | 13 | License revoked Relegated to 1992–93 1. Liga |
| 5 | FC Châtel-Saint-Denis | 10 | 2 | 4 | 4 | 13 | 17 | −4 | 2 | 10 | Play-out against relegation |
| 6 | FC Emmenbrücke | 10 | 1 | 3 | 6 | 6 | 19 | −13 | 1 | 6 | Remain in NLB 1993–94 |

Source: rsssf.com
Rules for classification: 1) Points; 2) Goal difference; 3) Goals scored; 4) Head-to-head points; 5) Away goals scored; 6) Draw.

Note: because SC Zug had their license revoked FC Emmenbrücke remained in NLB 1993–94

Group B

| Pos | Team | Pld | W | D | L | GF | GA | GD | BP | Pts | Qualification |
|---|---|---|---|---|---|---|---|---|---|---|---|
| 1 | FC Winterthur | 10 | 5 | 2 | 3 | 22 | 13 | +9 | 6 | 18 | Remain in NLB 1993–94 |
| 2 | SR Delémont | 10 | 6 | 3 | 1 | 23 | 9 | +14 | 1 | 16 | Remain in NLB 1993–94 |
| 3 | Urania Genève Sport | 10 | 4 | 3 | 3 | 20 | 15 | +5 | 5 | 16 | Remain in NLB 1993–94 |
| 4 | Étoile Carouge FC | 10 | 4 | 3 | 3 | 17 | 15 | +2 | 3 | 14 | Remain in NLB 1993–94 |
| 5 | FC Brüttisellen | 10 | 4 | 1 | 5 | 18 | 19 | −1 | 4 | 13 | Play-out against relegation |
| 6 | FC Glarus | 10 | 0 | 2 | 8 | 6 | 35 | −29 | 2 | 4 | Relegation to 1. Liga 1993–94 |

Source: rsssf.com
Rules for classification: 1) Points; 2) Goal difference; 3) Goals scored; 4) Head-to-head points; 5) Away goals scored; 6) Draw.

=== Relegation play-out ===
| Team 1 | Score | Team 2 |
|---|---|---|
| FC Châtel-Saint-Denis | 1–3 | FC Brüttisellen |
| FC Brüttisellen | 0–1 | FC Châtel-Saint-Denis |

FC Brüttisellen win 3–2 on aggregate. FC Châtel-Saint-Denis were originally relegated, however, because ES FC Malley had their license revoked they remained in NLB 1993–94

== 1. Liga ==
=== Group 1 ===
| Pos | Team | Pld | W | D | L | GF | GA | GD | Pts | Qualification or relegation |
|---|---|---|---|---|---|---|---|---|---|---|
| 1 | CS Chênois | 26 | 18 | 6 | 2 | 56 | 15 | +41 | 42 | Play-off to Nationalliga B |
| 2 | FC Martigny-Sports | 26 | 17 | 6 | 3 | 63 | 27 | +36 | 40 | Play-off to Nationalliga B |
| 3 | FC Monthey | 26 | 14 | 8 | 4 | 47 | 23 | +24 | 36 | |
| 4 | FC Fully | 26 | 13 | 6 | 7 | 40 | 34 | +6 | 32 | |
| 5 | FC Raron | 26 | 8 | 10 | 8 | 40 | 33 | +7 | 26 | |
| 6 | Grand-Lancy FC | 26 | 8 | 8 | 10 | 37 | 42 | −5 | 24 | |
| 7 | FC Montreux-Sports | 26 | 8 | 7 | 11 | 30 | 35 | −5 | 23 | |
| 8 | FC Stade Lausanne | 26 | 8 | 7 | 11 | 37 | 55 | −18 | 23 | |
| 9 | FC Renens | 26 | 10 | 3 | 13 | 39 | 40 | −1 | 23 | |
| 10 | FC Versoix | 26 | 10 | 2 | 14 | 36 | 46 | −10 | 22 | |
| 11 | FC Savièse | 26 | 7 | 8 | 11 | 43 | 63 | −20 | 22 | |
| 12 | FC Collex-Bossy | 26 | 6 | 7 | 13 | 32 | 53 | −21 | 19 | Play-out against relegation |
| 13 | FC Aigle | 26 | 6 | 6 | 14 | 36 | 41 | −5 | 18 | Relegation to 2. Liga Interregional |
| 14 | Concordia/Folgore Lausanne | 26 | 4 | 6 | 16 | 20 | 49 | −29 | 14 | Relegation to 2. Liga Interregional |

Source: RSSSF
Rules for classification: 1) Points; 2) Goal difference within the league, but decider play-off for qualifiers.

=== Group 2 ===
| Pos | Team | Pld | W | D | L | GF | GA | GD | Pts | Qualification or relegation |
|---|---|---|---|---|---|---|---|---|---|---|
| 1 | SC Bümpliz 78 | 26 | 14 | 6 | 6 | 46 | 31 | +15 | 34 | Play-off to Nationalliga B |
| 2 | FC Solothurn | 26 | 12 | 8 | 6 | 41 | 25 | +16 | 32 | To decider for second place |
| 3 | FC Moutier | 26 | 12 | 8 | 6 | 42 | 35 | +7 | 32 | To decider for second place |
| 4 | FC Münsingen | 26 | 12 | 6 | 8 | 31 | 21 | +10 | 30 | |
| 5 | FC Serrières | 26 | 10 | 9 | 7 | 46 | 41 | +5 | 29 | |
| 6 | SV Lyss | 26 | 9 | 10 | 7 | 41 | 39 | +2 | 28 | |
| 7 | FC Colombier | 26 | 9 | 8 | 9 | 39 | 42 | −3 | 26 | |
| 8 | FC Echallens | 26 | 8 | 9 | 9 | 35 | 38 | −3 | 25 | |
| 9 | FC Klus-Balsthal | 26 | 8 | 6 | 12 | 36 | 40 | −4 | 22 | |
| 10 | SC Burgdorf | 26 | 7 | 8 | 11 | 34 | 36 | −2 | 22 | |
| 11 | FC Lerchenfeld | 26 | 9 | 4 | 13 | 38 | 51 | −13 | 22 | |
| 12 | FC Thun | 26 | 6 | 10 | 10 | 29 | 44 | −15 | 22 | Play-out against relegation |
| 13 | FC Domdidier | 26 | 6 | 8 | 12 | 28 | 40 | −12 | 20 | Relegation to 2. Liga Interregional |
| 14 | FC Bern | 26 | 5 | 10 | 11 | 30 | 33 | −3 | 20 | Relegation to 2. Liga Interregional |

Source: RSSSF
Rules for classification: 1) Points; 2) Goal difference within the league, but decider play-off for qualifiers.

==== Decider for second place ====
Played on 2 June 1992 at Stade des Chézards in Colombier.

| Team 1 | Score | Team 2 |
|---|---|---|
| FC Solothurn | 3–0 | FC Moutier |

FC Solothurn win and advance to play-offs.

=== Group 3 ===
| Pos | Team | Pld | W | D | L | GF | GA | GD | Pts | Qualification or relegation |
|---|---|---|---|---|---|---|---|---|---|---|
| 1 | FC Red Star Zürich | 26 | 13 | 7 | 6 | 41 | 27 | +14 | 33 | Play-off to Nationalliga B |
| 2 | FC Ascona | 26 | 13 | 6 | 7 | 43 | 34 | +9 | 32 | To decider for second place |
| 3 | FC Pratteln | 26 | 12 | 8 | 6 | 40 | 27 | +13 | 32 | To decider for second place |
| 4 | SC Young Fellows Juventus | 26 | 11 | 9 | 6 | 40 | 31 | +9 | 31 | |
| 5 | FC Sursee | 26 | 10 | 10 | 6 | 38 | 22 | +16 | 30 | |
| 6 | FC Mendrisio | 26 | 12 | 6 | 8 | 42 | 30 | +12 | 30 | |
| 7 | FC Kölliken | 26 | 11 | 8 | 7 | 39 | 32 | +7 | 30 | |
| 8 | SC Buochs | 26 | 9 | 9 | 8 | 31 | 26 | +5 | 27 | |
| 9 | FC Laufen | 26 | 10 | 6 | 10 | 27 | 32 | −5 | 26 | |
| 10 | FC Riehen | 26 | 8 | 9 | 9 | 42 | 40 | +2 | 25 | |
| 11 | FC Tresa/Monteggio | 26 | 4 | 13 | 9 | 20 | 33 | −13 | 21 | |
| 12 | FC Suhr | 26 | 6 | 8 | 12 | 26 | 39 | −13 | 20 | Play-out against relegation |
| 13 | FC Stabio | 26 | 4 | 6 | 16 | 27 | 57 | −30 | 14 | Relegation to 2. Liga Interregional |
| 14 | FC Wangen bei Olten | 26 | 3 | 7 | 16 | 24 | 50 | −26 | 13 | Relegation to 2. Liga Interregional |

Source: RSSSF
Rules for classification: 1) Points; 2) Goal difference within the league, but decider play-off for qualifiers.

==== Decider for second place ====
Played on 2 June 1992 at Stadion Schlottermilch in Sursee.

| Team 1 | Score | Team 2 |
|---|---|---|
| FC Ascona | 3–0 | FC Pratteln |

FC Ascona win and advance to play-offs.

=== Group 4 ===
| Pos | Team | Pld | W | D | L | GF | GA | GD | Pts | Qualification or relegation |
|---|---|---|---|---|---|---|---|---|---|---|
| 1 | FC Tuggen | 26 | 17 | 7 | 2 | 55 | 25 | +30 | 41 | Play-off to Nationalliga B |
| 2 | FC Wil | 26 | 14 | 7 | 5 | 59 | 32 | +27 | 35 | To decider for second place |
| 3 | FC Frauenfeld | 26 | 14 | 7 | 5 | 45 | 24 | +21 | 35 | To decider for second place |
| 4 | FC Zug | 26 | 11 | 12 | 3 | 41 | 27 | +14 | 34 | |
| 5 | FC Altstetten (Zürich) | 26 | 12 | 8 | 6 | 54 | 36 | +18 | 32 | |
| 6 | FC Rorschach | 26 | 8 | 12 | 6 | 43 | 29 | +14 | 28 | |
| 7 | FC Altstätten (St. Gallen) | 26 | 9 | 8 | 9 | 41 | 40 | +1 | 26 | |
| 8 | FC Freienbach | 26 | 8 | 7 | 11 | 49 | 51 | −2 | 23 | |
| 9 | FC Stäfa | 26 | 7 | 9 | 10 | 43 | 46 | −3 | 23 | |
| 10 | SC Brühl | 26 | 7 | 9 | 10 | 35 | 39 | −4 | 23 | |
| 11 | FC Herisau | 26 | 5 | 12 | 9 | 30 | 33 | −3 | 22 | |
| 12 | SC Veltheim | 26 | 5 | 8 | 13 | 26 | 47 | −21 | 18 | Play-out against relegation |
| 13 | FC Balzers | 26 | 6 | 5 | 15 | 29 | 63 | −34 | 17 | Relegation to 2. Liga Interregional |
| 14 | FC Kreuzlingen | 26 | 2 | 3 | 21 | 12 | 70 | −58 | 7 | Relegation to 2. Liga Interregional |

Source: RSSSF
Rules for classification: 1) Points; 2) Goal difference within the league, but decider play-off for qualifiers.

==== Decider for second place ====
Played on 2 June 1992 at Paul-Grüninger-Stadion in St. Gallen

| Team 1 | Score | Team 2 |
|---|---|---|
| FC Wil | 2–1 | FC Frauenfeld |

FC Wil win and advance to play-offs.

=== Promotion play-offs ===
Qualification round

| Team 1 | Score | Team 2 |
|---|---|---|
| FC Solothurn | 0–0 | CS Chênois |
| CS Chênois | 4–0 | FC Solothurn |

CS Chênois win 4–0 on aggregate and continue to the finals.

| Team 1 | Score | Team 2 |
|---|---|---|
| FC Martigny-Sports | 1–1 | SC Bümpliz 78 |
| SC Bümpliz 78 | 5–2 | FC Martigny-Sports |

SC Bümpliz 78 win 6–3 on aggregate and continue to the finals.

| Team 1 | Score | Team 2 |
|---|---|---|
| FC Wil | 0–0 | FC Red Star Zürich |
| FC Red Star Zürich | 0–2 | FC Wil |

FC Wil win 2–0 on aggregate and continue to the finals.

| Team 1 | Score | Team 2 |
|---|---|---|
| FC Ascona | 0–3 | FC Tuggen |
| FC Tuggen | 4–2 | FC Ascona |

FC Tuggen win 7–2 on aggregate and continue to the finals.

Final round

| Team 1 | Score | Team 2 |
|---|---|---|
| CS Chênois | 1–1 | SC Bümpliz 78 |
| SC Bümpliz 78 | 0–1 | CS Chênois |

CS Chênois win 1–0 on aggregate and are promoted to 1992–93 Nationalliga B.

| Team 1 | Score | Team 2 |
|---|---|---|
| FC Wil | 5–1 | FC Tuggen |
| FC Tuggen | 0–0 | FC Wil |

FC Wil win 5–1 on aggregate and are promoted to 1992–93 Nationalliga B.

Play-off for third place

| Team 1 | Score | Team 2 |
|---|---|---|
| SC Bümpliz 78 | 2–2 a.e.t. 4–1 pen. | FC Tuggen |

SC Bümpliz 78 win after penalty shoot-out and are promoted to 1992–93 Nationalliga B.

=== Relegation play-out ===
First round

| Team 1 | Score | Team 2 |
|---|---|---|
| FC Thun | 1–1 a.e.t. 5–3 pen. | FC Collex-Bossy |

FC Collex-Bossy were defeated and continue to the final.

| Team 1 | Score | Team 2 |
|---|---|---|
| SC Veltheim | 2–1 | FC Suhr |

FC Suhr were defeated and continue to the final.

Final round

| Team 1 | Score | Team 2 |
|---|---|---|
| FC Collex-Bossy | 2–1 | FC Suhr |
| FC Suhr | 1–0 | FC Collex-Bossy |

FC Suhr win on away goals. FC Collex-Bossy are relegated to 2. Liga.

== Swiss Cup ==
The routes of the finalists to the final, played on 8 June 1992 at the Wankdorf in Bern:

=== Early rounds ===
Round 3

| Team 1 | Score | Team 2 |
|---|---|---|
28 September 1991
| FC Suhr | 1–5 | FC Luzern |
29 September 1991
| FC Frauenfeld | 0–3 | FC Lugano |

Round 4

| Team 1 | Score | Team 2 |
|---|---|---|
29 March 1992
| FC Grenchen | 0–1 | FC Luzern |
| AC Bellinzona | 1–2 | FC Lugano |

Round 5

| Team 1 | Score | Team 2 |
|---|---|---|
16 April 1992
| FC Luzern | 2–0 | FC Tuggen |
| FC Lugano | 3–0 | FC Baden |

Quarter-finals

| Team 1 | Score | Team 2 |
|---|---|---|
5 May 1992
| FC Luzern | 1–1 (a.e.t.) (p. 5–4) | FC Sion |
| FC Basel | 2–3 | FC Lugano |

Semi-finals

| Team 1 | Score | Team 2 |
|---|---|---|
12 May 1992
| FC Luzern | 4–0 | FC Wettingen |
19 May 1992
| Servette FC | 2–4 (a.e.t.) | FC Lugano |

=== Final ===
8 June 1992
15:00

| FC Luzern | 3 – 1 (a.e.t.) | FC Lugano |
|---|---|---|
| Moser 41'; Knup 96', 117' | Report | 36' Andrioli |

Wankdorf, Bern
Attendance: 40,000
Referee: (Switzerland) Arturo Martino (Neukirch an der Thur)

== Swiss Clubs in Europe ==
- Grasshopper Club as 1990–91 Nationalliga A champions: 1991–92 European Cup and entered 1991 Intertoto Cup
- Sion as 1990–91 Swiss Cup winners: 1991–92 Cup Winners' Cup first round
- Xamax as league third placed team: 1991–92 UEFA Cup and entered 1991 Intertoto Cup
- Lausanne-Sport as league forth placed team: 1991–92 UEFA Cup and entered 1991 Intertoto Cup
- Lugano: entered 1991 Intertoto Cup

=== Grasshopper Club ===
==== European Cup ====
===== First round =====
| 18 September 1991 First leg | Anderlecht (Belgium) | 1–1 | (Switzerland) Grasshopper Club | Constant Vanden Stock Stadium, Brussels |
| 20:00 | Degryse 43' | UEFA report | Nemtsoudis 66' | Attendance: 9,000; Referee: Jan Damgaard (Denmark) |

| 2 October 1991 Second leg | Grasshopper Club (Switzerland) | 0–3 | (Belgium) Anderlecht | Stadion Wankdorf, Bern |
| 20:15 | | UEFA report | Nilis 8', 24', 82' | Attendance: 10,800; Referee: Neil Midgley (England) |

Anderlecht won 4–1 on aggregate.

==== Intertoto Cup ====
===== Group 6 =====
| Pos | Team | Pld | W | D | L | GF | GA | GD | Pts | GCZ | SIÓ | FRE |
|---|---|---|---|---|---|---|---|---|---|---|---|---|
| 1 | (Switzerland) Grasshopper Club | 4 | 2 | 1 | 1 | 5 | 5 | 0 | 5 | — | 1–0 | 3–2 |
| 2 | (Hungary) Siófok | 4 | 1 | 2 | 1 | 8 | 6 | +2 | 4 | 1–1 | — | 3–3 |
| 3 | (Denmark) Frem | 4 | 1 | 1 | 2 | 8 | 10 | −2 | 3 | 2–0 | 1–4 | — |

Source: Pawel Mogielnicki's Page

(Slovenia) Olimpija Ljubljana withdrew during the tournament.

=== Sion ===
==== Cup Winners' Cup ====
===== First round =====
| 17 September 1991 First leg | Valur (Iceland) | 0–1 | (Switzerland) Sion | Laugardalsvöllur, Reykjavík |
| | | Report | Rey 80' | Attendance: 761; Referee: Svend Christensen (Denmark) |

| 2 October 1991 Second leg | Sion (Switzerland) | 1–1 | (Iceland) Valur | Stade de Tourbillon, Sion |
| | Orlando 78' | Report | Einarsson 67' | Attendance: 6,100; Referee: José Veiga Trigo (Portugal) |

Sion won 2–1 on aggregate.

===== Second round =====
| 23 October 1991 First leg | Sion (Switzerland) | 0–0 | (Netherlands) Feyenoord | Stade de Tourbillon, Sion |
| | | Report | | Attendance: 9,111; Referee: Jozef Marko (Czechoslovakia) |

| 6 November 1991 Second leg | Feyenoord (Netherlands) | 0–0 (a.e.t.) (5–3 p) | (Switzerland) Sion | De Kuip, Rotterdam |
| | | Report | | Attendance: 24,408; Referee: Kim Milton Nielsen (Denmark) |
| | Penalties |
| | Metgod (penalty scored); Sabău (penalty scored); Fraser (penalty scored); De Wolf (penalty scored); Bosz (penalty scored) | | (penalty scored) Calderón; (penalty missed) Sauthier; (penalty scored) Geiger; (penalty scored) Baljić |

0–0 on aggregate; Feyenoord won 5–3 on penalties.

=== Xamax ===
==== UEFA Cup ====
===== First round =====
| 17 September 1991 First leg | Neuchâtel Xamax (Switzerland) | 2–0 | (Malta) Floriana | Stade de la Maladière, Neuchâtel |
| 20:15 | Mottiez 43'; I. Hassan 58' | Report | | Attendance: 4,200; Referee: René Bindels (Luxembourg) |

| 1 October 1991 Second leg | Floriana (Malta) | 0–0 | (Switzerland) Neuchâtel Xamax | National Stadium, Ta' Qali |
| 15:15 | | Report | | Attendance: 1,345; Referee: Fabio Baldas (Italy) |

Neuchâtel Xamax won 2–0 on aggregate.

===== Second round =====
| 22 October 1991 First leg | Neuchâtel Xamax (Switzerland) | 5–1 | (Scotland) Celtic | Stade de la Maladière, Neuchâtel |
| 20:15 | H. Hassan 10', 20', 56', 74'; Bonvin 38' | Report | O'Neil 60' | Attendance: 11,300; Referee: Alphonse Constantin (Belgium) |

| 6 November 1991 Second leg | Celtic (Scotland) | 1–0 | (Switzerland) Neuchâtel Xamax | Celtic Park, Glasgow |
| 20:10 | Miller 52' | Report | | Attendance: 25,454; Referee: Pierluigi Pairetto (Italy) |

Neuchâtel Xamax won 5–2 on aggregate.

===== Third round =====
| 27 November 1991 First leg | Neuchâtel Xamax (Switzerland) | 1–0 | (Spain) Real Madrid | Stade de la Maladière, Neuchâtel |
| 20:30 | I. Hassan 35' | Report | | Attendance: 20,400; Referee: Mario van der Ende (Netherlands) |

| 12 December 1991 Second leg | Real Madrid (Spain) | 4–0 | (Switzerland) Neuchâtel Xamax | Estadio Santiago Bernabéu, Madrid |
| 21:00 | I. Hassan 47' (o.g.); Hagi 53'; Míchel 63' (pen.); Sanchís 68' | Report | | Attendance: 59,000; Referee: Joël Quiniou (France) |

Real Madrid won 4–1 on aggregate.

==== Intertoto Cup ====
===== Group 1 =====
| Pos | Team | Pld | W | D | L | GF | GA | GD | Pts | NEU | SLO | MAL | TAT |
|---|---|---|---|---|---|---|---|---|---|---|---|---|---|
| 1 | (Switzerland) Neuchâtel Xamax | 6 | 4 | 2 | 0 | 14 | 3 | +11 | 10 | — | 2–2 | 0–0 | 5–0 |
| 2 | (Czechoslovakia) Slovan Bratislava | 6 | 1 | 3 | 2 | 10 | 11 | −1 | 5 | 0–2 | — | 1–1 | 4–2 |
| 3 | (Sweden) Malmö FF | 6 | 0 | 5 | 1 | 5 | 6 | −1 | 5 | 1–2 | 2–2 | — | 0–0 |
| 4 | (Hungary) Tatabánya | 6 | 1 | 2 | 3 | 5 | 14 | −9 | 4 | 0–3 | 2–1 | 1–1 | — |

Source: Pawel Mogielnicki's Page

=== Lausanne-Sport ===
==== UEFA Cup ====
===== First round =====
| 17 September 1991 First leg | Gent (Belgium) | 0–1 | (Switzerland) Lausanne | Jules Ottenstadion, Ghent |
| 20:00 | | Report | Cina 41' | Attendance: 5,900; Referee: Keith Cooper (Wales) |

| 2 October 1991 Second leg | Lausanne (Switzerland) | 0–1 (a.e.t.) (1–4 p) | (Belgium) Gent | Stade olympique de la Pontaise, Lausanne |
| 20:00 | | Report | Verkuijl 46' | Attendance: 13,100; Referee: Joaquín Urío Velázquez (Spain) |
| | Penalties |
| | Verlaat (penalty missed); Cina (penalty missed); Gigon (penalty scored) | | (penalty scored) Viscaal; (penalty scored) Vandenbergh; (penalty scored) Van Der Linden; (penalty scored) De Roover |

1–1 on aggregate. Gent won 4–1 on penalties.

==== Intertoto Cup ====
===== Group 2 =====
| Pos | Team | Pld | W | D | L | GF | GA | GD | Pts | LS | LYN | ZAG | NOR |
|---|---|---|---|---|---|---|---|---|---|---|---|---|---|
| 1 | (Switzerland) Lausanne-Sport | 6 | 5 | 0 | 1 | 22 | 7 | +15 | 10 | — | 4–1 | 8–1 | 3–1 |
| 2 | (Denmark) Lyngby BK | 6 | 4 | 0 | 2 | 16 | 12 | +4 | 8 | 3–1 | — | 3–0 | 3–1 |
| 3 | (Poland) Zagłębie Lubin | 6 | 2 | 1 | 3 | 9 | 17 | −8 | 5 | 1–3 | 3–0 | — | 2–1 |
| 4 | (Sweden) IFK Norrköping | 6 | 0 | 1 | 5 | 8 | 19 | −11 | 1 | 0–3 | 2–6 | 3–2 | — |

Source: Pawel Mogielnicki's Page

=== Lugano ===
==== Intertoto Cup ====
===== Group 9 =====
| Pos | Team | Pld | W | D | L | GF | GA | GD | Pts | TIN | LUG | SPO | BUD |
|---|---|---|---|---|---|---|---|---|---|---|---|---|---|
| 1 | (Austria) Tirol Innsbruck | 4 | 3 | 0 | 1 | 11 | 4 | +7 | 6 | — | 2–1 | 6–0 | – |
| 2 | (Switzerland) Lugano | 4 | 2 | 0 | 2 | 7 | 6 | +1 | 4 | 2–1 | — | 4–1 | – |
| 3 | (Romania) Sportul București | 4 | 1 | 0 | 3 | 4 | 12 | −8 | 2 | 1–2 | 2–0 | — | – |
| 4 | (Socialist Federal Republic of Yugoslavia) Budućnost Titograd | 0 | 0 | 0 | 0 | 0 | 0 | 0 | 0 | – | – | – | — |

Source: Pawel Mogielnicki's Page

(Socialist Federal Republic of Yugoslavia) Budućnost Titograd withdrew during the tournament.

== Sources ==
- Switzerland 1991–92 at RSSSF
- Cup finals at Fussball-Schweiz
- Intertoto history at Pawel Mogielnicki's Page
- Josef Zindel (2018). FC Basel 1893. Die ersten 125 Jahre (in German). Basel: Friedrich Reinhardt Verlag. ISBN 978-3-7245-2305-5.

| Preceded by 1990–92 | Seasons in Swiss football | Succeeded by 1992–93 |
