= F.C. Copenhagen in European football =

- Club: F.C. Copenhagen
- First entry: 1992–93 UEFA Cup
- Latest entry: 2026–27 UEFA Conference League

F.C. Copenhagen (Danish: FC København) is a Danish football club based in the nation's capital city, Copenhagen. Formed in 1992 as the result of a merger between Kjøbenhavns Boldklub and Boldklubben 1903, the club has competed in UEFA competition in all but one season of its existence. Their best seasons came in the 2010–11 UEFA Champions League, when they became the first Danish team to reach the round of 16 in the competition, and the 2023–24 Champions League, when they reached the last 16 for a second time. They also reached the quarter-finals of the 2019–20 UEFA Europa League, the first time they had reached that stage of any UEFA competition.

== Overall record ==
=== By competition ===
Fully up to date as of 5 November 2026

Competition	Played	Won	Drawn	Lost	GF	GA	GD	Win %
European Cup / Champions League	120	49	31	40	162	152	+10	40.83
UEFA Cup / UEFA Europa League	112	41	33	38	143	117	+26	36.61
UEFA Europa Conference League	39	23	8	8	89	45	+44	58.97
UEFA Cup Winners' Cup	12	6	3	3	25	13	+12	50.00
UEFA Intertoto Cup	16	7	3	6	24	27	−3	43.75
Total	299	126	78	95	443	353	+90	42.14

Source: UEFA.com
Pld = Matches played; W = Matches won; D = Matches drawn; L = Matches lost; GF = Goals for; GA = Goals against; GD = Goal Difference. Defunct competitions indicated in italics.

== Matches ==
Season	Competition	Round	Opponent	Home	Away	Aggregate
1992	UEFA Intertoto Cup	Group 1	(Czech Republic) Sigma Olomouc	1–3	1–1	1st place
1992	UEFA Intertoto Cup	Group 1	(Switzerland) Grasshopper	2–1	3–0	1st place
1992	UEFA Intertoto Cup	Group 1	(Austria) Admira Wacker	5–3	2–0	1st place
1992–93	UEFA Cup	First round	(Finland) MP	5–0	5–1	10–1
1992–93	UEFA Cup	Second round	(France) Auxerre	0–2	0–5	0–7
1993	UEFA Intertoto Cup	Group 3	(Sweden) IFK Norrköping	0–3	—N/a	5th place
1993	UEFA Intertoto Cup	Group 3	(Switzerland) Lausanne	—N/a	1–3	5th place
1993	UEFA Intertoto Cup	Group 3	Austria Wien	—N/a	0–1	5th place
1993	UEFA Intertoto Cup	Group 3	(Poland) Pogoń Szczecin	1–4	—N/a	5th place
1993–94	UEFA Champions League	First round	(Northern Ireland) Linfield	4–0 (a.e.t.)	0–3	4–3
1993–94	UEFA Champions League	Second round	(Italy) Milan	0–6	0–1	0–7
1994–95	UEFA Cup	Preliminary round	(Finland) FC Jazz Pori	0–1	4–0	4–1
1994–95	UEFA Cup	First round	(Slovakia) Slovan Bratislava	1–1	0–1	1–2
1995–96	UEFA Cup Winners' Cup	First round	(Czech Republic) Hradec Králové	2–2	0–5	2–7
1996	UEFA Intertoto Cup	Group 3	(Sweden) Örebro SK	2−2	—N/a	2nd place
1996	UEFA Intertoto Cup	Group 3	(Slovenia) Maribor	—N/a	1−0	2nd place
1996	UEFA Intertoto Cup	Group 3	Austria Wien	2−1	—N/a	2nd place
1996	UEFA Intertoto Cup	Group 3	(Iceland) Keflavík	—N/a	2−1	2nd place
1997–98	UEFA Cup Winners' Cup	First round	(Armenia) Ararat Yerevan	3–0	2–0	5–0
1997–98	UEFA Cup Winners' Cup	Second round	(Spain) Real Betis	1–1	0–2	1–3
1998–99	UEFA Cup Winners' Cup	QR	(Azerbaijan) Qarabağ	6–0	4–0	10–0
1998–99	UEFA Cup Winners' Cup	First round	(Bulgaria) Levski Sofia	4–1	2–0	6–1
1998–99	UEFA Cup Winners' Cup	Second round	(England) Chelsea	0–1	1–1	1–2
1999	UEFA Intertoto Cup	Second round	(Poland) Polonia Warsaw	0–3	1–1	1–4
2001–02	UEFA Champions League	Q2	(Georgia (country)) Torpedo Kutaisi	3–1	1–1	4–2
2001–02	UEFA Champions League	Q3	(Italy) Lazio	2–1	1–4	3–5
2001–02	UEFA Cup	First round	(Federal Republic of Yugoslavia) FK Obilić	2–0	2–2	4–2
2001–02	UEFA Cup	Second round	(Netherlands) Ajax	0–0	1–0	1–0
2001–02	UEFA Cup	Third round	(Germany) Borussia Dortmund	0–1	0–1	0–2
2002–03	UEFA Cup	Q1	(Georgia (country)) Locomotive Tbilisi	3–1	4–1	7–2
2002–03	UEFA Cup	First round	(Sweden) Djurgårdens IF	0–0	1–3	1–3
2003–04	UEFA Cup	First round	(Hungary) Ferencváros	1–1 (a.e.t.)	1–1	2–2 (3–2 p)
2003–04	UEFA Cup	Second round	(Spain) Mallorca	1–2	1–1	2–3
2004–05	UEFA Champions League	Q2	(Slovenia) ND Gorica	0–5	2–1	2–6
2005–06	UEFA Cup	Q2	(Wales) Carmarthen Town	2–0	2–0	4–0
2005–06	UEFA Cup	First round	(Germany) Hamburger SV	0–1	1–1	1–2
2006–07	UEFA Champions League	Q2	(Finland) MyPa	2–0	2–2	4–2
2006–07	UEFA Champions League	Q3	(Netherlands) Ajax	1–2	2–0	3–2
2006–07	UEFA Champions League	Group stage (Group F)	(Portugal) Benfica	0–0	1–3	4th place
2006–07	UEFA Champions League	Group stage (Group F)	(Scotland) Celtic	3–1	0–1	4th place
2006–07	UEFA Champions League	Group stage (Group F)	(England) Manchester United	1–0	0–3	4th place
2007–08	UEFA Champions League	Q2	(Israel) Beitar Jerusalem	1–0	1–1 (a.e.t.)	2–1
2007–08	UEFA Champions League	Q3	(Portugal) Benfica	0–1	1–2	1–3
2007–08	UEFA Cup	First round	(France) Lens	2–1 (a.e.t.)	1–1	3–2
2007–08	UEFA Cup	Group B	(Greece) Panathinaikos	0–1	—N/a	4th place
2007–08	UEFA Cup	Group B	(Russia) Lokomotiv Moscow	—N/a	1–0	4th place
2007–08	UEFA Cup	Group B	(Spain) Atlético Madrid	0–2	—N/a	4th place
2007–08	UEFA Cup	Group B	(Scotland) Aberdeen	—N/a	0–4	4th place
2008–09	UEFA Cup	Q1	(Northern Ireland) Cliftonville	7–0	4–0	11–0
2008–09	UEFA Cup	Q2	(Norway) Lillestrøm SK	3–1	4–2	7–2
2008–09	UEFA Cup	First round	(Russia) FC Moscow	1–1	2–1	3–2
2008–09	UEFA Cup	Group G	(France) Saint-Étienne	1–3	—N/a	3rd place
2008–09	UEFA Cup	Group G	(Spain) Valencia	—N/a	1–1	3rd place
2008–09	UEFA Cup	Group G	(Norway) Rosenborg	1–1	—N/a	3rd place
2008–09	UEFA Cup	Group G	(Belgium) Club Brugge	—N/a	1–0	3rd place
2008–09	UEFA Cup	Round of 32	(England) Manchester City	2–2	1–2	3–4
2009–10	UEFA Champions League	Q2	(Montenegro) FK Mogren	6–0	6–0	12–0
2009–10	UEFA Champions League	Q3	(Norway) Stabæk	3–0	0–0	3–1
2009–10	UEFA Champions League	Play-off round	(Cyprus) APOEL	1–0	1–3	2–3
2009–10	UEFA Europa League	Group stage (Group K)	(Romania) CFR Cluj	2–0	0–2	2nd place
2009–10	UEFA Europa League	Group stage (Group K)	(Czech Republic) Sparta Prague	1–0	3–0	2nd place
2009–10	UEFA Europa League	Group stage (Group K)	(Netherlands) PSV Eindhoven	1–1	0–1	2nd place
2009–10	UEFA Europa League	Round of 32	(France) Marseille	1–3	1–3	2–6
2010–11	UEFA Champions League	Q3	(Belarus) BATE Borisov	3–2	0–0	3–2
2010–11	UEFA Champions League	Play-off round	(Norway) Rosenborg	1–0	1–2	2–2 (a)
2010–11	UEFA Champions League	Group stage (Group D)	(Russia) Rubin Kazan	1–0	0–1	2nd place
2010–11	UEFA Champions League	Group stage (Group D)	(Greece) Panathinaikos	3–1	2–0	2nd place
2010–11	UEFA Champions League	Group stage (Group D)	(Spain) Barcelona	1–1	0–2	2nd place
2010–11	UEFA Champions League	Round of 16	(England) Chelsea	0–2	0–0	0–2
2011–12	UEFA Champions League	Q3	(Republic of Ireland) Shamrock Rovers	1–0	2–0	3–0
2011–12	UEFA Champions League	Play-off round	(Czech Republic) Viktoria Plzeň	1–3	1–2	2–5
2011–12	UEFA Europa League	Group stage (Group B)	(Ukraine) Vorskla Poltava	1–0	1–1	3rd place
2011–12	UEFA Europa League	Group stage (Group B)	(Belgium) Standard Liège	0–1	0–3	3rd place
2011–12	UEFA Europa League	Group stage (Group B)	(Germany) Hannover 96	1–2	2–2	3rd place
2012–13	UEFA Champions League	Q3	(Belgium) Club Brugge	0–0	3–2	3–2
2012–13	UEFA Champions League	Play-off round	(France) Lille	1–0	0–2 (a.e.t.)	1–2
2012–13	UEFA Europa League	Group stage (Group E)	(Norway) Molde	2–1	2–1	3rd place
2012–13	UEFA Europa League	Group stage (Group E)	(Romania) FCSB	1–1	0–1	3rd place
2012–13	UEFA Europa League	Group stage (Group E)	(Germany) VfB Stuttgart	0–2	0–0	3rd place
2013−14	UEFA Champions League	Group stage (Group B)	(Spain) Real Madrid	0–2	0–4	4th place
2013−14	UEFA Champions League	Group stage (Group B)	(Turkey) Galatasaray	1–0	1–3	4th place
2013−14	UEFA Champions League	Group stage (Group B)	(Italy) Juventus	1–1	1–3	4th place
2014–15	UEFA Champions League	Q3	(Ukraine) Dnipro Dnipropetrovsk	2–0	0–0	2–0
2014–15	UEFA Champions League	Play-off round	(Germany) Bayer Leverkusen	2–3	0–4	2–7
2014–15	UEFA Europa League	Group stage (Group B)	(Belgium) Club Brugge	0–4	1–1	4th place
2014–15	UEFA Europa League	Group stage (Group B)	(Italy) Torino	1–5	0–1	4th place
2014–15	UEFA Europa League	Group stage (Group B)	(Finland) HJK	2–0	1–2	4th place
2015–16	UEFA Europa League	Q2	(Wales) Newtown	2–0	3–1	5–1
2015–16	UEFA Europa League	Q3	(Czech Republic) FK Baumit Jablonec	2–3	1–0	3–3 (a)
2016–17	UEFA Champions League	Q2	(Northern Ireland) Crusaders	6–0	3–0	9–0
2016–17	UEFA Champions League	Q3	(Romania) Astra Giurgiu	3–0	1–1	4–1
2016–17	UEFA Champions League	Play-off round	(Cyprus) APOEL	1–0	1–1	2–1
2016–17	UEFA Champions League	Group stage (Group G)	(England) Leicester City	0–0	0–1	3rd place
2016–17	UEFA Champions League	Group stage (Group G)	(Portugal) Porto	0–0	1–1	3rd place
2016–17	UEFA Champions League	Group stage (Group G)	(Belgium) Club Brugge	4–0	2–0	3rd place
2016–17	UEFA Europa League	Round of 32	(Bulgaria) Ludogorets Razgrad	0–0	2–1	2–1
2016–17	UEFA Europa League	Round of 16	(Netherlands) Ajax	2–1	0–2	2–3
2017–18	UEFA Champions League	Q2	(Slovakia) Žilina	1–2	3–1	4–3
2017–18	UEFA Champions League	Q3	(North Macedonia) Vardar	4–1	0–1	4–2
2017–18	UEFA Champions League	Play-off round	(Azerbaijan) Qarabağ	2–1	0–1	2–2 (a)
2017–18	UEFA Europa League	Group stage (Group F)	(Czech Republic) FC Fastav Zlín	3–0	1–1	2nd place
2017–18	UEFA Europa League	Group stage (Group F)	(Moldova) Sheriff Tiraspol	2–0	0–0	2nd place
2017–18	UEFA Europa League	Group stage (Group F)	(Russia) Lokomotiv Moscow	0–0	1–2	2nd place
2017–18	UEFA Europa League	Round of 32	(Spain) Atlético Madrid	1–4	0–1	1–5
2018–19	UEFA Europa League	Q1	(Finland) KuPS	1–1	1−0	2–1
2018–19	UEFA Europa League	Q2	(Iceland) Stjarnan	2–0	5–0	7–0
2018–19	UEFA Europa League	Q3	(Bulgaria) CSKA Sofia	2–1	2–1	4–2
2018–19	UEFA Europa League	Play-off round	(Italy) Atalanta	0–0 (a.e.t.)	0–0	0−0 (4−3 p)
2018–19	UEFA Europa League	Group stage (Group C)	(Russia) Zenit Saint Petersburg	1−1	0–1	4th place
2018–19	UEFA Europa League	Group stage (Group C)	(France) Bordeaux	0–1	2−1	4th place
2018–19	UEFA Europa League	Group stage (Group C)	(Czech Republic) Slavia Prague	0−1	0–0	4th place
2019–20	UEFA Champions League	Q2	(Wales) The New Saints	1−0	2−0	3−0
2019–20	UEFA Champions League	Q3	(Serbia) Red Star Belgrade	1–1 (a.e.t.)	1–1	2–2 (6–7 p)
2019–20	UEFA Europa League	Play-off round	(Latvia) Riga FC	3−1	0−1	3–2
2019–20	UEFA Europa League	Group stage (Group B)	(Ukraine) Dynamo Kyiv	1–1	1–1	2nd place
2019–20	UEFA Europa League	Group stage (Group B)	(Sweden) Malmö FF	0−1	1–1	2nd place
2019–20	UEFA Europa League	Group stage (Group B)	(Switzerland) Lugano	1–0	1–0	2nd place
2019–20	UEFA Europa League	Round of 32	(Scotland) Celtic	1–1	3–1	4–2
2019–20	UEFA Europa League	Round of 16	(Turkey) İstanbul Başakşehir	3–0	0–1	3–1
2019–20	UEFA Europa League	Quarter-finals	(England) Manchester United	0–1 (a.e.t.)		
2020–21	UEFA Europa League	Q2	(Sweden) IFK Göteborg	—N/a	2–1	—N/a
2020–21	UEFA Europa League	Q3	(Poland) Piast Gliwice	3–0	—N/a	—N/a
2020–21	UEFA Europa League	Play-off round	(Croatia) Rijeka	0–1	—N/a	—N/a
2021–22	UEFA Europa Conference League	Q2	(Belarus) Torpedo-BelAZ Zhodino	4–1	5–0	9–1
2021–22	UEFA Europa Conference League	Q3	(Bulgaria) Lokomotiv Plovdiv	4–2	1–1	5–3
2021–22	UEFA Europa Conference League	Play-off round	(Turkey) Sivasspor	5–0	2–1	7–1
2021–22	UEFA Europa Conference League	Group stage (Group F)	(Greece) PAOK	1–2	2–1	1st place
2021–22	UEFA Europa Conference League	Group stage (Group F)	(Slovakia) Slovan Bratislava	2–0	3–1	1st place
2021–22	UEFA Europa Conference League	Group stage (Group F)	(Gibraltar) Lincoln Red Imps	3–1	4–0	1st place
2021–22	UEFA Europa Conference League	Round of 16	(Netherlands) PSV Eindhoven	0–4	4–4	4–8
2022–23	UEFA Champions League	Play-off round	(Turkey) Trabzonspor	2–1	0–0	2–1
2022–23	UEFA Champions League	Group stage (Group G)	(England) Manchester City	0–0	0–5	4th place
2022–23	UEFA Champions League	Group stage (Group G)	(Spain) Sevilla	0–0	0–3	4th place
2022–23	UEFA Champions League	Group stage (Group G)	(Germany) Borussia Dortmund	1–1	0–3	4th place
2023–24	UEFA Champions League	Q2	(Iceland) Breiðablik	6–3	2–0	8–3
2023–24	UEFA Champions League	Q3	(Czech Republic) Sparta Prague	0–0	3–3 (a.e.t.)	3–3 (4–2 p)
2023–24	UEFA Champions League	Play-off round	(Poland) Raków Częstochowa	1–1	1–0	2–1
2023–24	UEFA Champions League	Group stage (Group A)	(Germany) Bayern Munich	1–2	0–0	2nd place
2023–24	UEFA Champions League	Group stage (Group A)	(England) Manchester United	4–3	0–1	2nd place
2023–24	UEFA Champions League	Group stage (Group A)	(Turkey) Galatasaray	1–0	2–2	2nd place
2023–24	UEFA Champions League	Round of 16	(England) Manchester City	1–3	1–3	2–6
2024–25	UEFA Conference League	Q2	(Gibraltar) Bruno's Magpies	5–1	3–0	8–1
2024–25	UEFA Conference League	Q3	(Czech Republic) Baník Ostrava	1–0	0–1 (a.e.t.)	1–1 (2–1 p)
2024–25	UEFA Conference League	PO	(Scotland) Kilmarnock	2–0	1–1	3–1
2024–25	UEFA Conference League	League phase	(Poland) Jagiellonia Białystok	1–2	—N/a	18th place
2024–25	UEFA Conference League	League phase	(Spain) Real Betis	—N/a	1–1	18th place
2024–25	UEFA Conference League	League phase	(Turkey) İstanbul Başakşehir	2–2	—N/a	18th place
2024–25	UEFA Conference League	League phase	(Belarus) Dinamo Minsk	—N/a	2–1	18th place
2024–25	UEFA Conference League	League phase	(Scotland) Heart of Midlothian	2–0	—N/a	18th place
2024–25	UEFA Conference League	League phase	(Austria) Rapid Wien	—N/a	0–3	18th place
2024–25	UEFA Conference League	Knockout phase play-offs	(Germany) 1. FC Heidenheim	1–2	3–1 (a.e.t.)	4–3
2024–25	UEFA Conference League	Round of 16	(England) Chelsea	1–2	0–1	1–3
2025–26	UEFA Champions League	Q2	(Kosovo) Drita	2–0	1–0	3–0
2025–26	UEFA Champions League	Q3	(Sweden) Malmö FF	5–0	0–0	5–0
2025–26	UEFA Champions League	PO	(Switzerland) Basel	2–0	1–1	3–1
2025–26	UEFA Champions League	League phase	(Germany) Bayer Leverkusen	2–2	—N/a	31st place
2025–26	UEFA Champions League	League phase	(Azerbaijan) Qarabağ	—N/a	0–2	31st place
2025–26	UEFA Champions League	League phase	(Germany) Borussia Dortmund	2–4	—N/a	31st place
2025–26	UEFA Champions League	League phase	(England) Tottenham Hotspur	—N/a	0–4	31st place
2025–26	UEFA Champions League	League phase	(Kazakhstan) Kairat	3–2	—N/a	31st place
2025–26	UEFA Champions League	League phase	(Spain) Villarreal	—N/a	3–2	31st place
2025–26	UEFA Champions League	League phase	(Italy) Napoli	1–1	—N/a	31st place
2025–26	UEFA Champions League	League phase	(Spain) Barcelona	—N/a	1–4	31st place
2026–27	UEFA Conference League	Q2	(Ukraine) Polissya Zhytomyr	2–1	3–3	5–4
2026–27	UEFA Conference League	Q3	(Hungary) Debrecen	5–1	3–0	8–1
2026–27	UEFA Conference League	PO	(Finland) Inter Turku	4–1	0–0	4–1
2026–27	UEFA Conference League	League phase	(Portugal) Braga	3–0	—N/a	
2026–27	UEFA Conference League	League phase	(Serbia) Red Star Belgrade	—N/a	2–2	
2026–27	UEFA Conference League	League phase	(Georgia (country)) Iberia 1999	2–1	—N/a	
2026–27	UEFA Conference League	League phase	(Andorra) Inter Club d'Escaldes	—N/a	26 Nov	
2026–27	UEFA Conference League	League phase	(Switzerland) FC Lugano	10 Dec	—N/a	
2026–27	UEFA Conference League	League phase	(Romania) Universitatea Craiova	—N/a	17 Dec	
Season	Competition	Round	Opponent	Home	Away	Aggregate

== Best results ==
- UEFA Champions League
  - Round of 16: 2010–11, 2023–24
- UEFA Europa League/UEFA Cup
  - Quarter-finals: 2019–20
  - Round of 16: 2016–2017
  - Round of 32: 1992–93, 2001–02, 2008–09, 2009–10, 2017–18
- UEFA Conference League
  - Round of 16: 2021–22, 2024–25
- UEFA Cup Winners' Cup
  - Round of 16: 1997–98, 1998–99
  - Round of 32: 1995–96

== UEFA club coefficient ranking ==
=== Current ===
As of 20 February 2025, Source:

Rank	Team	Points
43	(France) Marseille	48.000
44	(Portugal) Braga	46.000
45	(Denmark) Copenhagen	44.375
46	(Turkey) Fenerbahçe	44.250
47	(Serbia) Red Star Belgrade	44.000

=== Rankings since 2006 ===
As of 20 February 2025, Source:

Season	Ranking	Movement	Points	Change
2006–07	139	▲ +4	16.593	▲ +0.917
2007–08	116	▲ +23	19.129	▲ +2.536
2008–09	99	▲ +17	23.748	▲ +4.619
2009–10	72	▲ +27	26.890	▲ +3.142
2010–11	60	▲ +12	34.470	▲ +7.580
2011–12	39	▲ +21	51.110	▲ +16.64
2012–13	44	▼ −5	46.505	▼ −4.605
2013–14	45	▼ −1	47.140	▲ +0.635
2014–15	50	▼ −5	45.260	▼ −1.880
2015–16	52	▼ −2	40.960	▼ −4.300
2016–17	86	▼ −34	24.720	▼ −16.240
2017–18	54	▲ +32	37.800	▲ +13.080
2018–19	43	▲ +11	34.000	▼ -3.800
2019–20	46	▼ -3	31.000	▼ -3.000
2020–21	35	▲ +11	42.000	▲ +11.000
2021–22	41	▲ -1.5	40.500	▼ -1.500
2022–23	44	▲ +0	40.500	+0.000
2023–24	37	▲ +11	51.500	▲ +11.000
