= 1992–93 Swiss 1. Liga =

1. Liga
- Season: 1992–93
- Champions: Group 1: Monthey; Group 2: Serrières; Group 3: Sursee; Group 4: Gossau
- Promoted: Monthey; Sursee; Gossau
- Relegated: Group 1: Savièse; Malley; Group 2: Lerchenfeld; Dürrenast; Burgdorf; Group 3: SC Zug; FC Morbio; Group 4: Veltheim; Herisau
- Matches: 4 times 182 plus 13 play-offs and 4 play-outs

The 1992–93 Swiss 1. Liga was the 61st season of this league since its creation in 1931. At this time, the 1. Liga was the third tier of the Swiss football league system and it was the highest level of amateur football.

== Format ==
There were 56 clubs in the 1. Liga, divided into four regional groups of 14 teams. Within each group, the teams would play a double round-robin to decide their league position. Two points were awarded for a win. The four group winners and the four runners-up then contested a play-off for the three promotion slots. The two last placed teams in each group were directly relegated to the 2. Liga (fourth tier). The four third-last placed teams would compete a play-out against the ninth relegation spot.

== Group 1 ==
=== Teams ===
Club	Canton	Stadium	Capacity
FC Echallens	Vaud	Sportplatz 3 Sapins	2,000
FC Fully	Valais	Stade de Charnot	1,000
Grand-Lancy FC	Geneva	Stade de Marignac	1,500
ES FC Malley	Vaud	Centre Sportif de la Tuilière	1,500
FC Martigny-Sports	Valais	Stade d'Octodure	2,500
FC Monthey	Valais	Stade Philippe Pottier	1,800
FC Montreux-Sports	Vaud	Stade de Chailly	1,000
FC Naters	Valais	Sportanlage Stapfen	3,000
FC Raron	Valais	Sportplatz Rhoneglut	1,000
FC Renens	Waadt	Zone sportive du Censuy	2,300
FC Savièse	Valais	Stade St-Germain	2,000
FC Stade Lausanne	Vaud	Centre sportif de Vidy	1,000
FC Versoix	Geneva	Centre sportif de la Bécassière	1,000
Vevey Sports	Vaud	Stade de Copet	4,000

=== Final league table ===
Pos	Team	Pld	W	D	L	GF	GA	GD	Pts	Qualification or relegation
1	FC Monthey	26	15	6	5	55	31	+24	36	Play-off to Nationalliga B
2	FC Renens	26	13	8	5	49	33	+16	34	Play-off to Nationalliga B
3	FC Stade Lausanne	26	11	9	6	43	25	+18	31	
4	FC Naters	26	12	6	8	46	37	+9	30	
5	FC Echallens	26	14	2	10	45	39	+6	30	
6	Grand-Lancy FC	26	11	6	9	45	35	+10	28	
7	FC Montreux-Sports	26	11	5	10	49	42	+7	27	
8	FC Raron	26	9	9	8	38	33	+5	27	
9	Vevey Sports	26	9	9	8	39	37	+2	27	
10	FC Martigny-Sports	26	10	6	10	49	40	+9	26	
11	FC Fully	26	8	7	11	43	48	−5	23	
12	FC Versoix	26	5	12	9	26	29	−3	22	Play-out against relegation
13	FC Savièse	26	6	8	12	42	51	−9	20	Relegation to 2. Liga Interregional
14	ES FC Malley	26	1	1	24	20	109	−89	3	Relegation to 2. Liga Interregional

Source: RSSSF
Rules for classification: 1) Points; 2) Goal difference; 3) Goals scored; 4) Play-off.

== Group 2 ==
=== Teams ===
Club	Canton	Stadium	Capacity
SC Burgdorf	canton of Bern	Stadion Neumatt	3,850
FC Colombier	Neuchâtel	Stade des Chézards	2,500
FC Concordia Basel	Basel-City	Stadion Rankhof	7,000
FC Dürrenast	canton of Bern	Lachen	10,800
FC Laufen	Basel-Country	Sportplatz Nau	3,000
FC Le Locle	Neuchâtel	Installation sportive - Jeanneret	3,142
FC Lerchenfeld	canton of Bern	Sportanlagen Waldeck	2,400
SV Lyss	Bern	Sportzentrum Grien	2,000
FC Moutier	Bern	Stade de Chalière	5,000
FC Münsingen	Bern	Sportanlage Sandreutenen	1,400
FC Pratteln	Basel-Country	In den Sandgruben	5,000
FC Riehen	Basel-City	Sportplatz Grendelmatte	2,500
FC Serrières	Neuchâtel	Pierre-à-Bot	1,700

=== Final league table ===
Pos	Team	Pld	W	D	L	GF	GA	GD	Pts	Qualification or relegation
1	FC Serrières	26	16	7	3	48	20	+28	39	Play-off to Nationalliga B
2	FC Moutier	26	16	3	7	58	33	+25	35	Play-off to Nationalliga B
3	SV Lyss	26	14	6	6	52	32	+20	34	
4	FC Münsingen	26	12	8	6	39	25	+14	32	
5	FC Riehen	26	12	8	6	38	34	+4	32	
6	FC Colombier	26	14	3	9	50	33	+17	31	
7	FC Concordia Basel	26	10	6	10	39	39	0	26	
8	FC Laufen	26	7	9	10	26	33	−7	23	
9	FC Le Locle	26	8	7	11	33	47	−14	23	
10	FC Pratteln	26	6	10	10	26	44	−18	22	
11	FC Thun	26	5	9	12	41	50	−9	19	
12	SC Burgdorf	26	6	7	13	31	52	−21	19	Play-out against relegation
13	FC Lerchenfeld	26	5	6	15	38	50	−12	16	Relegation to 2. Liga Interregional
14	FC Dürrenast	26	3	7	16	33	61	−28	13	Relegation to 2. Liga Interregional

Source: RSSSF
Rules for classification: 1) Points; 2) Goal difference; 3) Goals scored; 4) Play-off.

== Group 3 ==
=== Teams ===
Club	Canton	Stadium	Capacity
FC Ascona	Ticino	Stadio Comunale Ascona	1,400
SC Buochs	Nidwalden	Stadion Seefeld	5,000
FC Freienbach	Schwyz	Chrummen	4,500
FC Klus-Balsthal	Solothurn	Sportplatz Moos	4,000
FC Kölliken	Aargau	Sportstätte Walke	2,000
FC Mendrisio	Ticino	Centro Sportivo Comunale	4,000
FC Morbio	Ticino	Campo comunale Balerna	1,000
FC Muri	Aargau	Stadion Brühl	2,350
FC Solothurn	Solothurn	Stadion FC Solothurn	6,750
FC Suhr	Aargau	Hofstattmatten	2,000
FC Sursee	Lucerne	Stadion Schlottermilch	3,500
FC Tresa/Monteggio	Ticino	Centro Sportivo Passera	1,280
FC Zug	Zug	Herti Allmend Stadion	6,000
SC Zug	Zug	Herti Allmend Stadion	6,000

=== Final league table ===
Pos	Team	Pld	W	D	L	GF	GA	GD	Pts	Qualification or relegation
1	FC Sursee	26	17	7	2	73	28	+45	41	Play-off to Nationalliga B
2	FC Solothurn	26	17	4	5	66	32	+34	38	Play-off to Nationalliga B
3	FC Suhr	26	11	7	8	36	38	−2	29	
4	FC Ascona	26	11	6	9	46	34	+12	28	
5	FC Mendrisio	26	11	6	9	36	29	+7	28	
6	FC Zug	26	10	7	9	42	39	+3	27	
7	FC Tresa/Monteggio	26	11	4	11	36	47	−11	26	
8	FC Klus-Balsthal	26	10	4	12	33	38	−5	24	
9	SC Buochs	26	8	7	11	39	45	−6	23	
10	FC Muri	26	10	2	14	45	49	−4	22	
11	FC Kölliken	26	8	5	13	35	39	−4	21	
12	FC Freienbach	26	7	7	12	43	49	−6	21	Play-out against relegation
13	SC Zug	26	6	6	14	27	51	−24	18	Relegation to 2. Liga Interregional
14	FC Morbio	26	5	8	13	30	69	−39	18	Relegation to 2. Liga Interregional

Source: RSSSF
Rules for classification: 1) Points; 2) Goal difference; 3) Goals scored; 4) Play-off.

== Group 4 ==
=== Teams ===
Club	Canton	Stadium	Capacity
FC Altstätten (St. Gallen)	St. Gallen	Grüntal Altstätten	1,000
FC Altstetten (Zürich)	Zürich	Buchlern	1,000
SC Brühl	St. Gallen	Paul-Grüninger-Stadion	4,200
FC Frauenfeld	Thurgau	Kleine Allmend	6,370
FC Glarus	Glarus	Buchholz	800
FC Gossau	St. Gallen	Sportanlage Buechenwald	3,500
FC Herisau	Appenzell Ausserrhoden	Ebnet	2,000
FC Red Star Zürich	Zürich	Allmend Brunau	2,000
FC Rorschach	Schwyz	Sportplatz Kellen	1,000
FC Stäfa	Zürich	Sportanlage Frohberg	1,500
FC Tuggen	Schwyz	Linthstrasse	2,800
SC Veltheim	Aargau	Sportanlage Flüeli	2,000
FC Wiedikon	Zürich	Heuried	1,000
SC YF Juventus	Zürich	Utogrund	2,850

=== Final league table ===
Pos	Team	Pld	W	D	L	GF	GA	GD	Pts	Qualification or relegation
1	FC Gossau	26	19	6	1	63	17	+46	44	Play-off to Nationalliga B
2	FC Red Star Zürich	26	14	7	5	46	27	+19	35	Play-off to Nationalliga B
3	FC Tuggen	26	12	8	6	47	30	+17	32	
4	FC Altstetten (Zürich)	26	8	13	5	50	39	+11	29	
5	FC Rorschach	26	10	9	7	28	28	0	29	
6	SC Brühl	26	11	5	10	44	38	+6	27	
7	SC Young Fellows Juventus	26	7	12	7	37	31	+6	26	
8	FC Wiedikon	26	7	11	8	34	35	−1	25	
9	FC Frauenfeld	26	7	9	10	35	40	−5	23	
10	FC Altstätten (St. Gallen)	26	5	10	11	36	45	−9	20	
11	FC Stäfa	26	6	8	12	32	52	−20	20	
12	FC Glarus	26	7	6	13	37	60	−23	20	Play-out against relegation
13	SC Veltheim	26	4	9	13	23	44	−21	17	Relegation to 2. Liga Interregional
14	FC Herisau	26	4	9	13	25	51	−26	17	Relegation to 2. Liga Interregional

Source: RSSSF
Rules for classification: 1) Points; 2) Goal difference; 3) Goals scored; 4) Play-off.

== Promotion play-off ==
=== Qualification round ===
Team 1	Score	Team 2
FC Solothurn	0–0	FC Gossau
FC Gossau	4–1	FC Solothurn

FC Gossau win 4–1 on aggregate and continue to the finals.

Team 1	Score	Team 2
FC Moutier	1–4	FC Monthey
FC Monthey	6–0	FC Moutier

FC Monthey win 10–1 on aggregate and continue to the finals.

Team 1	Score	Team 2
FC Renens	4–1	FC Serrières
FC Serrières	2–4	FC Renens

FC Renens win 8–3 on aggregate and continue to the finals.

Team 1	Score	Team 2
FC Red Star Zürich	1–4	FC Sursee
FC Sursee	3–2	FC Red Star Zürich

FC Sursee win 7–3 on aggregate and continue to the finals.

=== Final round ===
Team 1	Score	Team 2
FC Gossau	1–1	FC Monthey
FC Monthey	1–1	FC Gossau

2–2 on aggregate, FC Gossau win 7–6 on penalties and are promoted to 1993–94 Nationalliga B.

Team 1	Score	Team 2
FC Renens	1–2	FC Sursee
FC Sursee	0–0	FC Renens

FC Sursee win 2–1 on aggregate and are promoted to 1993–94 Nationalliga B.

=== Decider for promotion ===
Team 1	Score	Team 2
FC Monthey	2–1	FC Renens

FC Monthey win and are promoted to 1993–94 Nationalliga B.

== Relegation play-out ==
=== First round ===
Team 1	Score	Team 2
FC Freienbach	2–1	FC Glarus

FC Glarus continue to the final.

Team 1	Score	Team 2
FC Versoix	4–0	SC Burgdorf

SC Burgdorf continue to the final.

=== Final round ===
Team 1	Score	Team 2
SC Burgdorf	0–2	FC Glarus
FC Glarus	2–2	SC Burgdorf

FC Glarus win 4–2 on aggregate and remain in 1993–94 1. Liga. SC Burgdorf are relegated to 2. Liga.

== Further in Swiss football ==
- 1992–93 Nationalliga A
- 1992–93 Nationalliga B
- 1992–93 Swiss Cup

== Sources ==
- Switzerland 1992–93 at RSSSF

Preceded by 1991–92	Seasons in Swiss 1. Liga	Succeeded by 1993–94
