= 1993–94 Swiss 1. Liga =

1. Liga
- Season: 1993–94
- Champions: Group 1: FC Naters; Group 2: SV Lyss; Group 3: SC Young Fellows Juventus; Group 4: FC Tuggen
- Promoted: FC Solothurn; FC Echallens; FC Tuggen
- Relegated: Group 1: FC Fully; FC Versoix; FC Châtel-Saint-Denis; Group 2: FC Laufen; FC Concordia Basel; Group 3: FC Wangen bei Olten; FC Brüttisellen; Group 4: FC Rorschach; FC Wädenswil; FC Altstetten
- Matches: 4 times 182 and 1 decider plus 14 play-offs and 4 play-outs

The 1993–94 Swiss 1. Liga was the 62nd season of this league since its creation in 1931. At this time, the 1. Liga was the third tier of the Swiss football league system and it was the highest level of amateur football.

== Format ==
There were 56 clubs in the 1. Liga, divided into four regional groups of 14 teams. Within each group, the teams would play a double round-robin to decide their league position. Two points were awarded for a win. The four group winners and the four runners-up then contested a play-off for the three promotion slots. The two last placed teams in each group were directly relegated to the 2. Liga (fourth tier). The four third-last placed teams would compete a play-out against the ninth and tenth relegation places.

== Group 1 ==
=== Teams ===
Club	Canton	Stadium	Capacity
FC Châtel-Saint-Denis	Fribourg	Stade du Lussy - Châtel-St-Denis	1,000
FC Echallens	Vaud	Sportplatz 3 Sapins	2,000
FC Fully	Valais	Stade de Charnot	1,000
Grand-Lancy FC	Geneva	Stade de Marignac	1,500
FC Martigny-Sports	Valais	Stade d'Octodure	2,500
FC Montreux-Sports	Vaud	Stade de Chailly	1,000
FC Naters	Valais	Sportanlage Stapfen	3,000
FC Raron	Valais	Sportplatz Rhoneglut	1,000
FC Renens	Waadt	Zone sportive du Censuy	2,300
Signal FC Bernex-Confignon	Geneva	Stade municipal de Bernex	1,000
FC Stade Lausanne	Vaud	Centre sportif de Vidy	1,000
FC Stade Nyonnais	Vaud	Stade de Colovray	7,200
FC Versoix	Geneva	Centre sportif de la Bécassière	1,000
Vevey Sports	Vaud	Stade de Copet	4,000

=== Final league table ===
Pos	Team	Pld	W	D	L	GF	GA	GD	Pts	Qualification or relegation
1	FC Naters	26	17	6	3	51	21	+30	40	Play-off to Challenge League
2	FC Echallens	26	13	10	3	55	36	+19	36	Play-off to Challenge League
3	FC Renens	26	16	2	8	53	31	+22	34	
4	FC Stade Nyonnais	26	10	10	6	41	34	+7	30	
5	Signal FC (Bernex)	26	12	6	8	42	38	+4	30	
6	FC Raron	26	10	6	10	43	39	+4	26	
7	FC Martigny-Sports	26	9	8	9	45	41	+4	26	
8	FC Stade Lausanne	26	10	4	12	36	38	−2	24	
9	FC Montreux-Sports	26	8	7	11	39	37	+2	23	
10	Grand-Lancy FC	26	8	7	11	45	52	−7	23	
11	Vevey Sports	26	8	7	11	28	40	−12	23	
12	FC Fully	26	7	5	14	43	48	−5	19	Play-out against relegation
13	FC Versoix	26	4	9	13	27	44	−17	17	Relegation to 2. Liga Interregional
14	FC Châtel-Saint-Denis	26	4	5	17	30	72	−42	13	Relegation to 2. Liga Interregional

Source: RSSSF
Rules for classification: 1) Points; 2) Goal difference within the league, but play-off for qualifiers.

== Group 2 ==
=== Teams ===
Club	Canton	Stadium	Capacity
SC Bümpliz 78	Bern	Bodenweid	4,000
FC Colombier	Neuchâtel	Stade des Chézards	2,500
FC Concordia Basel	Basel-City	Stadion Rankhof	7,000
FC La Chaux-de-Fonds	Neuchâtel	Centre Sportif de la Charrière	12,700
FC Laufen	Basel-Country	Sportplatz Nau	3,000
FC Le Locle	Neuchâtel	Installation sportive - Jeanneret	3,142
SV Lyss	Bern	Sportzentrum Grien	2,000
FC Moutier	Bern	Stade de Chalière	5,000
FC Münsingen	Bern	Sportanlage Sandreutenen	1,400
FC Pratteln	Basel-Country	In den Sandgruben	5,000
FC Riehen	Basel-City	Sportplatz Grendelmatte	2,500
FC Serrières	Neuchâtel	Pierre-à-Bot	1,700
FC Solothurn	Solothurn	Stadion FC Solothurn	6,750
FC Thun	Bern	Stadion Lachen	10,350

=== Final league table ===
Pos	Team	Pld	W	D	L	GF	GA	GD	Pts	Qualification or relegation
1	SV Lyss	26	17	3	6	45	33	+12	37	Play-off to Challenge League
2	FC Solothurn	26	16	2	8	57	35	+22	34	Play-off to Challenge League
3	FC Colombier	26	13	7	6	40	25	+15	33	
4	FC La Chaux-de-Fonds	26	13	6	7	56	35	+21	32	
5	FC Riehen	26	11	6	9	46	38	+8	28	
6	FC Moutier	26	13	2	11	48	48	0	28	
7	FC Serrières	26	11	3	12	48	44	+4	25	
8	FC Münsingen	26	9	6	11	25	28	−3	24	
9	FC Le Locle	26	7	10	9	37	48	−11	24	
10	FC Thun	26	7	9	10	41	45	−4	23	
11	SC Bümpliz 78	26	9	5	12	38	47	−9	23	
12	FC Pratteln	26	7	8	11	30	40	−10	22	Play-out against relegation
13	FC Laufen	26	7	4	15	24	39	−15	18	Relegation to 2. Liga Interregional
14	FC Concordia Basel	26	2	9	15	18	48	−30	13	Relegation to 2. Liga Interregional

Source: RSSSF
Rules for classification: 1) Points; 2) Goal difference within the league, but play-off for qualifiers.

== Group 3 ==
=== Teams ===
Club	Canton	Stadium	Capacity
FC Altstetten (Zürich)	Zürich	Buchlern	1,000
FC Brüttisellen	Zürich	Lindenbuck	1,000
SC Buochs	Nidwalden	Stadion Seefeld	5,000
FC Emmenbrücke	Lucerne	Stadion Gersag	8,700
FC Frauenfeld	Thurgau	Kleine Allmend	6,370
FC Klus-Balsthal	Solothurn	Sportplatz Moos	4,000
FC Kölliken	Aargau	Sportstätte Walke	2,000
FC Muri	Aargau	Stadion Brühl	2,350
FC Red Star Zürich	Zürich	Allmend Brunau	2,000
FC Suhr	Aargau	Hofstattmatten	2,000
FC Wangen bei Olten	Solothurn	Sportplatz Chrüzmatt	3,000
FC Wiedikon	Zürich	Heuried	1,000
SC YF Juventus	Zürich	Utogrund	2,850
Zug 94	Zug	Herti Allmend Stadion	6,000

=== Final league table ===
Pos	Team	Pld	W	D	L	GF	GA	GD	Pts	Qualification or relegation
1	SC Young Fellows Juventus	26	18	3	5	56	17	+39	39	Play-off to Nationalliga B
2	SC Buochs	26	12	11	3	46	28	+18	35	Play-off to Nationalliga B
3	FC Emmenbrücke	26	14	6	6	47	32	+15	34	
4	FC Suhr	26	12	10	4	43	29	+14	34	
5	FC Klus-Balsthal	26	10	9	7	32	29	+3	29	
6	FC Red Star Zürich	26	9	6	11	38	42	−4	24	
7	FC Kölliken	26	8	8	10	31	43	−12	24	
8	FC Wiedikon	26	9	5	12	46	47	−1	23	
9	FC Muri	26	9	5	12	41	52	−11	23	
10	FC Frauenfeld	26	7	8	11	37	40	−3	22	
11	FC Altstetten (Zürich)	26	6	9	11	45	46	−1	21	To decider for play-out
12	Zug 94	26	6	9	11	27	39	−12	21	To decider for play-out
13	FC Wangen bei Olten	26	6	7	13	31	48	−17	19	Relegation to 2. Liga
14	FC Brüttisellen	26	3	10	13	24	52	−28	16	Relegation to 2. Liga

Source: RSSSF
Rules for classification: 1) Points; 2) Goal difference within the league, but play-off for qualifiers.

=== Decider ===
Decider for 11th/12th position. 12th position means advance to play-out against relegation. The decider was played at a neutral ground. It took place in the Stadion Brühl in Muri, Aargau.

Team 1	Score	Team 2
FC Altstetten	0–1	Zug 94

Zug 94 win and remain in 1. Liga. Altstetten continue in play-outs.

== Group 4 ==
=== Teams ===
Club	Canton	Stadium	Capacity
FC Altstätten (St. Gallen)	St. Gallen	Grüntal Altstätten	1,000
FC Ascona	Ticino	Stadio Comunale Ascona	1,400
SC Brühl	St. Gallen	Paul-Grüninger-Stadion	4,200
FC Chur 97	Grisons	Ringstrasse	2,820
FC Freienbach	Schwyz	Chrummen	4,500
FC Glarus	Glarus	Buchholz	800
FC Tresa/Monteggio	Ticino	Cornaredo Stadium	6,330
FC Mendrisio	Ticino	Centro Sportivo Comunale	4,000
FC Rorschach	Schwyz	Sportplatz Kellen	1,000
FC Stäfa	Zürich	Sportanlage Frohberg	1,500
TSV St. Otmar St. Gallen	St. Gallen	Feldhandball-Rasen im Lerchenfeld	1,000
FC Tuggen	Schwyz	Linthstrasse	2,800
FC Vaduz	Liechtenstein	Rheinpark Stadion	7,584
FC Wädenswil	Zürich	Beichlen	1,000

=== Final league table ===
Pos	Team	Pld	W	D	L	GF	GA	GD	Pts	Qualification or relegation
1	FC Tuggen	26	19	3	4	62	24	+38	41	Play-off to Nationalliga B
2	FC Ascona	26	17	5	4	64	31	+33	39	Play-off to Nationalliga B
3	SC Brühl	26	16	6	4	60	27	+33	38	
4	FC Glarus	26	14	7	5	56	37	+19	35	
5	FC Mendrisio	26	9	8	9	40	37	+3	26	
6	FC Tresa/Monteggio	26	8	9	9	38	38	0	25	
7	FC Stäfa	26	9	7	10	42	51	−9	25	
8	FC Chur	26	9	6	11	34	38	−4	24	
9	FC Vaduz	26	9	6	11	37	49	−12	24	
10	TSV St. Otmar St. Gallen	26	9	6	11	28	42	−14	24	
11	FC Freienbach	26	7	7	12	34	41	−7	21	
12	FC Rorschach	26	6	8	12	29	39	−10	20	Play-out against relegation
13	FC Wädenswil	26	4	4	18	29	57	−28	12	Relegation to 2. Liga
14	FC Altstätten (St. Gallen)	26	2	6	18	17	59	−42	10	Relegation to 2. Liga

Source: RSSSF
Rules for classification: 1) Points; 2) Goal difference within the league, but play-off for qualifiers.

== Promotion play-offs ==
=== Qualification round ===
Team 1	Score	Team 2
FC Echallens	2–0	SV Lyss
SV Lyss	3–3	FC Echallens

FC Echallens win 5–3 on aggregate and continue to the finals.

Team 1	Score	Team 2
FC Solothurn	1–0	FC Naters
FC Naters	1–1	FC Solothurn

FC Solothurn win 2–1 on aggregate and continue to the finals.

Team 1	Score	Team 2
SC Buochs	1–4	FC Tuggen
FC Tuggen	3–2	SC Buochs

FC Tuggen win 7–3 on aggregate and continue to the finals.

Team 1	Score	Team 2
FC Ascona	0–1	SC Young Fellows Juventus
SC Young Fellows Juventus	1–2	FC Ascona

2–2 on aggregate. FC Ascona win on away goals and continue to the finals.

=== Final round ===
Team 1	Score	Team 2
FC Solothurn	1–1	FC Ascona
FC Ascona	1–3	FC Solothurn

FC Solothurn win 4–2 on aggregate and are promoted to Nationalliga B. FC Ascona continue in decider for 3rd place.

Team 1	Score	Team 2
FC Echallens	2–0	FC Tuggen
FC Tuggen	0–4	FC Echallens

FC Echallens win 6–0 on aggregate and are promoted to Nationalliga B. FC Tuggen continue in decider for 3rd place.

=== Decider for promotion ===
Team 1	Score	Team 2
FC Tuggen	2–0	FC Ascona

FC Tuggen win 2–0 and are promoted to Nationalliga B.

== Relegation play-outs ==
Team 1	Score	Team 2
FC Pratteln	0–0	FC Fully
FC Fully	0–1	FC Pratteln

Pratteln win 1–0 on aggregate and remain in 1. Liga. Fully are relegated.

Team 1	Score	Team 2
FC Rorschach	0–1	FC Altstetten
FC Altstetten	1–1	FC Rorschach

Altstetten win 2–1 on aggregate and remain in 1. Liga. Rorschach are relegated.

== See also ==
- 1993–94 Nationalliga A
- 1993–94 Nationalliga B
- 1993–94 Swiss Cup

== Sources ==
- Switzerland 1993–94 at RSSSF

Preceded by 1992–93	Seasons in Swiss 1. Liga	Succeeded by 1994–95
