= 1992 Intertoto Cup =

1992 European summer football tournament

In the 1992 Intertoto Cup no knock-out rounds were contested, and therefore no winner was declared.

== Group stage ==
The teams were divided into ten groups of four teams each.

=== Group 1 ===
Pos	Team	Pld	W	D	L	GF	GA	GD	Pts
1	(Denmark) Copenhagen	6	4	1	1	14	8	+6	9
2	(Czech Republic) Sigma Olomouc	6	2	2	2	9	8	+1	6
3	(Austria) Admira Wacker	6	2	1	3	10	14	−4	5
4	(Switzerland) Grasshopper Club	6	1	2	3	9	12	−3	4

=== Group 2 ===
Pos	Team	Pld	W	D	L	GF	GA	GD	Pts
1	(Hungary) Siófok	6	3	2	1	9	6	+3	8
2	(Czech Republic) Sparta Prague	6	3	2	1	9	7	+2	8
3	(Austria) Vorwärts Steyr	6	2	1	3	8	10	−2	5
4	(Switzerland) Lausanne-Sport	6	1	1	4	4	7	−3	3

=== Group 3 ===
Pos	Team	Pld	W	D	L	GF	GA	GD	Pts
1	(Germany) Bayer Uerdingen	6	5	0	1	8	4	+4	10
2	(Sweden) Häcken	6	2	2	2	12	8	+4	6
3	(Switzerland) St. Gallen	6	1	2	3	8	10	−2	4
4	(Austria) Stahl Linz	6	1	2	3	7	13	−6	4

=== Group 4 ===
Pos	Team	Pld	W	D	L	GF	GA	GD	Pts
1	(Germany) Karlsruher SC	6	2	3	1	12	9	+3	7
2	(Switzerland) Young Boys	6	2	2	2	13	12	+1	6
3	(Sweden) Halmstads BK	6	3	0	3	11	13	−2	6
4	Austria Salzburg	6	2	1	3	12	14	−2	5

=== Group 5 ===
Pos	Team	Pld	W	D	L	GF	GA	GD	Pts
1	(Austria) Rapid Wien	6	3	1	2	13	10	+3	7
2	(Sweden) Helsingborgs IF	6	2	3	1	11	13	−2	7
3	(Denmark) Brøndby IF	6	2	1	3	14	14	0	5
4	(Germany) VfL Bochum	6	1	3	2	7	8	−1	5

=== Group 6 ===
Pos	Team	Pld	W	D	L	GF	GA	GD	Pts
1	(Denmark) Lyngby BK	6	4	1	1	10	5	+5	9
2	(France) SM Caen	6	2	2	2	6	5	+1	6
3	(Germany) Schalke 04	6	2	2	2	11	11	0	6
4	(Netherlands) RKC Waalwijk	6	1	1	4	6	12	−6	3

=== Group 7 ===
Pos	Team	Pld	W	D	L	GF	GA	GD	Pts
1	(Czechoslovakia) Slovan Bratislava	6	4	1	1	18	11	+7	9
2	(Hungary) Váci Izzó	6	4	0	2	13	10	+3	8
3	(Denmark) Aarhus	6	1	3	2	6	7	−1	5
4	(Sweden) Kiruna	6	0	2	4	8	17	−9	2

=== Group 8 ===
Pos	Team	Pld	W	D	L	GF	GA	GD	Pts
1	(Denmark) AaB	6	4	2	0	11	2	+9	10
2	(Sweden) Hammarby IF	6	2	1	3	8	10	−2	5
3	(Netherlands) SVV/Dordrecht '90	6	1	3	2	7	10	−3	5
4	(Germany) Saarbrücken	6	1	2	3	6	10	−4	4

=== Group 9 ===
Pos	Team	Pld	W	D	L	GF	GA	GD	Pts
1	(Czech Republic) Slavia Prague	6	5	1	0	16	4	+12	11
2	(Germany) Bayer Leverkusen	6	2	2	2	8	7	+1	6
3	(Israel) Maccabi Petah Tikva	6	1	3	2	7	11	−4	5
4	(Israel) Maccabi Netanya	6	0	2	4	4	13	−9	2

=== Group 10 ===
Pos	Team	Pld	W	D	L	GF	GA	GD	Pts
1	(Bulgaria) Lokomotiv Gorna Oryahovitsa	6	3	2	1	6	6	0	8
2	(Bulgaria) Lokomotiv Sofia	6	2	2	2	8	7	+1	6
3	(Romania) Argeş Piteşti	6	2	1	3	11	10	+1	5
4	(Romania) Rapid București	6	1	3	2	8	10	−2	5

== See also ==
- 1992–93 Champions League
- 1992–93 European Cup Winners' Cup
- 1992–93 UEFA Cup
