= 1993–94 Nationalliga A =

Swiss football season

Nationalliga A
- Season: 1993–94
- Champions: Servette
- Relegated: Kriens; Yverdon-Sport
- Top goalscorer: Giovane Élber, Grasshopper Club (21 goals)

Nationalliga B
- Season: 1993–94
- Champions: Basel
- Promoted: Basel; St. Gallen
- Relegated: Old Boys; Bulle; Urania Genève Sport; Monthey; FC Sursee; Fribourg; Chiasso

Statistics of the Swiss National League in the 1993–94 football season, both Nationalliga A and Nationalliga B.

== Overview ==
The 32 teams of the Swiss Football League (Nationalliga) were divided into two tiers. In the top-tier, there were 12 teams that played in the Nationalliga A (NLA). There were 20 teams in the Nationalliga B (NLB), the second tier, these were divided into two groups, a West and an East group. Each team in each group played a double round-robin in the qualification phase. Thereafter the divisions were divided into a Swiss championship group, a promotion/relegation group (NLA/NLB) and two relegation groups (NLB/1. Liga), each group with eight teams. Due to a system change, the format of the following NLB season was to reduce the number of teams to just 16. Therefore, there were to be seven relegations from the NLB to next season's 1. Liga (third tier), with only three promotions in the opposite direction.

== Nationalliga A ==
=== Qualification phase ===
The qualification of the NLA began on 28 July 1993 and was completed on 12 December. Twelve teams competed in this first NLA stage. The top eight teams in the qualification phase then advanced to the championship group and the last four teams played against relegation.

==== Table ====
Pos	Team	Pld	W	D	L	GF	GA	GD	Pts	Qualification
1	Grasshopper Club	22	12	7	3	37	15	+22	43	Advance to championship round halved points (rounded up) as bonus
2	Sion	22	11	9	2	34	14	+20	42	Advance to championship round halved points (rounded up) as bonus
3	Young Boys	22	9	7	6	37	25	+12	34	Advance to championship round halved points (rounded up) as bonus
4	Servette	22	9	7	6	38	37	+1	34	Advance to championship round halved points (rounded up) as bonus
5	Lausanne-Sport	22	9	6	7	28	27	+1	33	Advance to championship round halved points (rounded up) as bonus
6	Lugano	22	7	8	7	23	27	−4	29	Advance to championship round halved points (rounded up) as bonus
7	Luzern	22	8	5	9	26	32	−6	29	Advance to championship round halved points (rounded up) as bonus
8	Aarau	22	8	5	9	24	31	−7	29	Advance to championship round halved points (rounded up) as bonus
9	Zürich	22	6	8	8	25	22	+3	26	Continue to promotion/relegation round
10	Xamax	22	4	9	9	24	31	−7	21	Continue to promotion/relegation round
11	Yverdon-Sport	22	3	8	11	19	33	−14	17	Continue to promotion/relegation round
12	Kriens	22	3	7	12	17	38	−21	16	Continue to promotion/relegation round

Source: rsssf.com
Rules for classification: 1) Points; 2) Goal difference; 3) Goals scored; 4) Head-to-head points; 5) Away goals scored; 6) Draw.

==== Results ====
Home \ Away	AAR	GCZ	KRI	LS	LUG	LUZ	NX	SER	SIO	YB	YS	ZÜR
Aarau		2–1	2–0	0–0	0–2	1–2	4–0	1–1	0–2	1–0	3–1	1–0
Grasshopper	1–1		1–1	4–1	2–0	2–0	5–1	1–0	1–1	3–3	3–3	2–0
Kriens	0–1	0–2		1–3	0–3	1–0	1–1	2–2	1–1	2–4	2–0	0–2
Lausanne-Sport	2–0	2–1	2–1		1–2	0–2	2–0	2–3	1–1	2–1	0–0	0–0
Lugano	1–3	0–3	0–0	0–0		1–0	2–2	1–1	2–0	0–2	2–1	2–2
Luzern	5–2	0–1	2–1	3–1	2–2		1–0	0–4	1–1	0–0	2–0	0–1
Neuchâtel Xamax	3–0	0–0	0–0	0–2	0–0	1–2		4–1	0–0	2–2	5–0	0–0
Servette	1–1	1–3	3–2	3–2	1–0	1–1	1–0		3–4	1–1	2–0	4–2
Sion	4–0	1–0	0–0	0–0	2–0	3–0	2–0	1–1		1–0	4–1	3–1
Young Boys	2–0	0–0	6–0	1–4	3–0	3–1	2–3	4–2	0–2		1–0	0–0
Yverdon-Sport	0–0	0–0	3–1	0–1	1–2	2–2	2–0	5–1	1–1	0–0		1–1
Zürich	3–1	0–1	0–1	4–0	1–1	4–0	2–2	0–1	1–0	1–2	0–0	

Legend: Blue = home team win; Yellow = draw; Red = away team win.

=== Championship group ===
The first eight teams of the qualification phase competed in the Championship round. The teams took half of the points (rounded up to complete units) gained in the qualification as bonus with them. The championship group began on 20 February 1994 and was completed on 10 May.

==== Table ====
Pos	Team	Pld	W	D	L	GF	GA	GD	BP	Pts	Qualification
1	Servette	14	8	5	1	29	14	+15	13	34	Swiss champions, qualified for 1994–95 Champions League and entered 1994 Intertoto Cup
2	Grasshopper Club	14	6	5	3	28	17	+11	16	33	Swiss Cup winners, qualified for 1994–95 Cup Winners' Cup and entered 1994 Intertoto Cup
3	Sion	14	5	5	4	21	15	+6	16	31	qualified for 1994–95 UEFA Cup first round and entered 1994 Intertoto Cup
4	Aarau	14	7	4	3	23	16	+7	11	29	qualified for 1994–95 UEFA Cup preliminary round
5	Lugano	14	5	5	4	21	19	+2	11	26	
6	Young Boys	14	2	6	6	13	23	−10	13	23	entered 1994 Intertoto Cup
7	Lausanne-Sport	14	4	1	9	14	28	−14	12	21	entered 1994 Intertoto Cup
8	Luzern	14	2	3	9	15	32	−17	11	18	

Source: rsssf.com
Rules for classification: 1) points; 2) Position in the qualification.

==== Results ====
Home \ Away	AAR	GCZ	LS	LUG	LUZ	SER	SIO	YB
Aarau		1–1	0–1	4–3	3–0	1–1	2–1	2–2
Grasshopper	1–1		3–0	3–3	3–0	4–2	3–1	4–0
Lausanne-Sport	1–0	2–3		0–2	1–3	0–3	1–1	1–2
Lugano	1–2	1–1	2–1		4–1	1–1	1–0	0–4
Luzern	1–3	3–1	1–2	1–3		2–4	2–2	0–0
Servette	1–0	1–1	3–0	1–0	3–0		4–3	1–1
Sion	1–1	1–0	5–0	0–0	2–0	0–0		1–1
Young Boys	1–2	0–0	0–4	0–0	1–1	1–4	1–3	

Legend: Blue = home team win; Yellow = draw; Red = away team win.

== Nationalliga B ==
=== Qualification phase ===
The qualification of the NLB began on 28 July 1993 and was completed on 21 November. The top two teams in each group were qualified for the promotion/relegation group. The bottom eight teams in each group then played in newly drawn groups against relegation.

==== Table group West ====
Pos	Team	Pld	W	D	L	GF	GA	GD	Pts	Qualification
1	FC Schaffhausen	18	13	3	2	41	21	+20	29	Advance to promotion/relegation NLA/LNB round
2	St. Gallen	18	9	5	4	35	21	+14	23	Advance to promotion/relegation NLA/LNB round
3	Baden	18	9	3	6	38	30	+8	21	Continue to relegation round NLB/1. Liga according to their rank, the teams would receive bonus points in the next stage
4	Bellinzona	18	8	5	5	33	30	+3	21	Continue to relegation round NLB/1. Liga according to their rank, the teams would receive bonus points in the next stage
5	Locarno	18	7	6	5	23	20	+3	20	Continue to relegation round NLB/1. Liga according to their rank, the teams would receive bonus points in the next stage
6	Chiasso	18	6	5	7	15	23	−8	17	Continue to relegation round NLB/1. Liga according to their rank, the teams would receive bonus points in the next stage
7	Winterthur	18	5	5	8	29	35	−6	15	Continue to relegation round NLB/1. Liga according to their rank, the teams would receive bonus points in the next stage
8	Wil	18	4	6	8	20	22	−2	14	Continue to relegation round NLB/1. Liga according to their rank, the teams would receive bonus points in the next stage
9	Gossau	18	1	9	8	15	29	−14	11	Continue to relegation round NLB/1. Liga according to their rank, the teams would receive bonus points in the next stage
10	FC Sursee	18	2	5	11	16	34	−18	9	Continue to relegation round NLB/1. Liga according to their rank, the teams would receive bonus points in the next stage

Source: rsssf.com
Rules for classification: 1) Points; 2) Goal difference; 3) Goals scored; 4) Head-to-head points; 5) Away goals scored; 6) Draw.

==== Table group East ====
Pos	Team	Pld	W	D	L	GF	GA	GD	Pts	Qualification
1	Étoile Carouge	18	11	5	2	33	13	+20	27	Advance to promotion/relegation NLA/LNB round
2	Basel	18	12	1	5	39	14	+25	25	Advance to promotion/relegation NLA/LNB round
3	Chênois	18	8	6	4	31	20	+11	22	Continue to relegation round NLB/1. Liga according to their rank, the teams would receive bonus points in the next stage
4	Old Boys	18	6	8	4	27	31	−4	20	Continue to relegation round NLB/1. Liga according to their rank, the teams would receive bonus points in the next stage
5	Monthey	18	6	6	6	25	23	+2	18	Continue to relegation round NLB/1. Liga according to their rank, the teams would receive bonus points in the next stage
6	Bulle	18	7	3	8	28	24	+4	17	Continue to relegation round NLB/1. Liga according to their rank, the teams would receive bonus points in the next stage
7	Grenchen	18	7	3	8	25	24	+1	17	Continue to relegation round NLB/1. Liga according to their rank, the teams would receive bonus points in the next stage
8	Delémont	18	7	3	8	24	29	−5	17	Continue to relegation round NLB/1. Liga according to their rank, the teams would receive bonus points in the next stage
9	Fribourg	18	6	1	11	21	28	−7	13	Continue to relegation round NLB/1. Liga according to their rank, the teams would receive bonus points in the next stage
10	Urania Genève Sport	18	2	0	16	11	58	−47	4	Continue to relegation round NLB/1. Liga according to their rank, the teams would receive bonus points in the next stage

Source: rsssf.com
Rules for classification: 1) Points; 2) Goal difference; 3) Goals scored; 4) Head-to-head points; 5) Away goals scored; 6) Draw.

=== Promotion/relegation group NLA/NLB ===
The teams in the ninth to twelfth positions in Nationalliga A competed with the top two teams of both Nationalliga B groups in a NLA/NLB promotion/relegation round. The stage began on 20 February and was completed on 9 May 1994.

==== Table ====
Pos	Team	Pld	W	D	L	GF	GA	GD	Pts	Qualification or relegation
1	Basel	14	7	6	1	22	7	+15	20	Promoted to NLA 1994–95
2	St. Gallen	14	8	4	2	28	14	+14	20	Promoted to NLA 1994–95
3	Xamax	14	9	2	3	21	12	+9	20	Remain in NLA 1994–95
4	Zürich	14	7	4	3	24	15	+9	18	Remain in NLA 1994–95
5	Kriens	14	4	4	6	21	20	+1	12	Relegated to NLB 1994–95
6	Étoile Carouge	14	3	5	6	14	24	−10	11	Remain in NLB 1994–95
7	FC Schaffhausen	14	2	3	9	14	31	−17	7	Remain in NLB 1994–95
8	Yverdon-Sport	14	1	2	11	8	29	−21	4	Relegated to NLB 1994–95

Source: rsssf.com

==== Results ====
Home \ Away	BAS	ÉTO	KRI	NX	STG	SHA	YS	ZÜR
Basel		0–0	1–0	3–1	3–0	3–0	1–1	1–1
Étoile Carouge	1–1		2–2	0–2	3–0	2–2	2–0	0–0
Kriens	0–1	3–0		0–0	1–1	5–0	2–0	1–2
Neuchâtel Xamax	1–0	2–1	2–0		1–1	1–0	3–1	1–0
St. Gallen	0–0	5–1	3–0	3–1		4–1	3–1	3–0
Schaffhausen	1–4	1–2	2–2	1–3	0–1		2–0	0–1
Yverdon-Sport	0–3	1–0	1–4	0–2	1–1	1–2		1–2
Zürich	1–1	5–0	5–1	2–1	1–3	2–2	2–0	

Legend: Blue = home team win; Yellow = draw; Red = away team win.

=== Relegation groups NLB/1. Liga ===
The last eight teams in each of the two qualification phase groups competed in two relegation groups against relegation to the 1. Liga 1994–95. The teams were drawn into these two groups and received ranking bonus points from their qualifying groups (3rd place 8 pts; 4th place 7 pts; 5th place 6 pts; etc). There were three direct relegations and a relegation play-out between the two fifth placed teams. This stage began on 5 March 1993 and was completed on 25 May.

==== Table group A ====
Pos	Team	Pld	W	D	L	GF	GA	GD	BP	Pts	Qualification or relegation
1	Baden	14	8	2	4	29	12	+17	8	26	Remain in NLB
2	Locarno	14	8	3	3	22	19	+3	6	25	Remain in NLB
3	Delémont	14	8	3	3	25	19	+6	3	22	Remain in NLB
4	Winterthur	14	6	4	4	28	24	+4	4	20	Remain in NLB
5	Gossau	14	7	2	5	21	13	+8	2	18	Play-out against relegation
6	Old Boys	14	4	2	8	17	24	−7	7	17	Relegation to 1. Liga 1994–95
7	Bulle	14	1	5	8	9	22	−13	5	12	Relegation to 1. Liga 1994–95
8	Urania Genève Sport	14	2	3	9	17	35	−18	1	8	Relegation to 1. Liga 1994–95

Source: RSSSF
Rules for classification: 1) Points; 2) Goal difference; 3) Goals scored; 4) Head-to-head points; 5) Away goals scored; 6) Draw.

==== Table group B ====
Pos	Team	Pld	W	D	L	GF	GA	GD	BP	Pts	Qualification or relegation
1	Wil	14	9	3	2	22	12	+10	3	24	Remain in NLB
2	Chênois	14	6	4	4	18	15	+3	8	24	Remain in NLB
3	Grenchen	14	7	5	2	22	12	+10	4	23	Remain in NLB
4	Bellinzona	14	6	3	5	22	17	+5	7	22	Remain in NLB
5	Chiasso	14	4	7	3	17	9	+8	5	20	Play-out against relegation
6	Monthey	14	5	4	5	26	20	+6	6	20	Relegation to 1. Liga 1994–95
7	FC Sursee	14	3	3	8	13	27	−14	1	10	Relegation to 1. Liga 1994–95
8	Fribourg	14	1	1	12	9	37	−28	2	5	Relegation to 1. Liga 1994–95

Source: RSSSF
Rules for classification: 1) Points; 2) Goal difference; 3) Goals scored; 4) Head-to-head points; 5) Away goals scored; 6) Draw.

==== Play-out against relegation ====
Team 1	Score	Team 2
Gossau	1–0	Chiasso
Chiasso	1–1	Gossau

Gossau win 2–1 on aggregate. Chiasso is relegated to 1. Liga 1994–95.

== Attendances ==
#	Club	Average
1	Sion	8,639
2	Xamax	8,350
3	Luzern	7,736
4	Servette	6,006
5	Young Boys	5,350
6	Aarau	5,139
7	Zürich	4,956
8	GCZ	4,794
9	Lausanne	4,772
10	Yverdon	3,156
11	Lugano	2,933
12	Kriens	2,878

== Further in Swiss football ==
- 1993–94 Swiss Cup
- 1993–94 Swiss 1. Liga

== Sources ==
- Switzerland 1993–94 at RSSSF
