= 1992–93 UEFA Cup =

22nd season of Europe's secondary club football tournament organised by UEFA

Tournament details
- Dates: 15 September 1992 – 19 May 1993
- Teams: 64

Final positions
- Champions: (Italy) Juventus (3rd title)
- Runners-up: (Germany) Borussia Dortmund

Tournament statistics
- Matches played: 126
- Goals scored: 394 (3.13 per match)
- Attendance: 2,337,805 (18,554 per match)
- Top scorer(s): Gérald Baticle (Auxerre); 8 goals

The 1992–93 UEFA Cup was the 22nd season of Europe's then-tertiary club football tournament organised by UEFA. The final was played over two legs at Westfalenstadion, Dortmund, Germany, and at Stadio Delle Alpi, Turin, Italy. The competition was won by Italian club Juventus, who beat Borussia Dortmund of Germany by an aggregate result of 6–1, to claim their third UEFA Cup title.

Juventus became the first club to win the UEFA Cup three times, and registered a record score for a two-legged UEFA Cup final. Due to the breakup of Yugoslavia and the international sanctions for the ongoing Yugoslav Wars, UEFA banned all Yugoslavian teams from competing. Slovenia, a former Yugoslav republic, was represented for the first time in the UEFA Cup, although Olimpija Ljubljana competed in its unofficial predecessor Inter-Cities Fairs' Cup in the late 1960s.

== Association team allocation ==
A total of 64 teams from 31 UEFA member associations participated in the 1992–93 UEFA Cup, all entering from the first round over six knock-out rounds. The association ranking based on the UEFA country coefficients was originally used to determine the number of participating teams for each association:

- Associations 1–3 each have four teams qualify.
- Associations 4–8 each have three teams qualify.
- Associations 9–21 each have two teams qualify.
- Associations 22–32 each have one team qualify.

The various political reorganizations and disputes in Europe resulted in various changes in the team allocation. Yugoslavia (association 10 in the ranking) and Albania were banned from entering the competition, and their three berths went to associations 9, 11 and 12 as a third berth. East Germany had ceased to exist as a country after the German reunification, and its results were erased from the UEFA ranking. As the place allocation was one team short, the newly formed Slovenia was allowed to enter the competition without a ranking coefficient.

=== Association ranking ===
For the 1992–93 UEFA Cup, the associations are allocated places according to their 1991 UEFA country coefficients, which takes into account their performance in European competitions from 1986–87 to 1990–91. Therefore, it did not include any of the new football federations that had join UEFA in the prior months. Having returned to European competitions in 1990 after a five-year ban, England's score was limited to the last of the five seasons accounted for in the ranking, and only two English clubs competed in the UEFA Cup.

Association ranking for 1992–93 UEFA Cup

Rank	Association	Coeff.	Teams	Notes
1	Italy	48.171	4	
2	Germany	46.387	4	
3	Spain	38.666	4	
4	France	34.650	3	
5	Belgium	34.433	3	
6	Portugal	29.633	3	
7	Netherlands	26.150	3	
8	Soviet Union: Russia; Ukraine	25.566	3	
9	Scotland	24.500	3	
10	FR Yugoslavia	24.466	0	
11	Romania	24.300	3	
12	Austria	21.000	3	
-	East Germany	19.250	0	
13	Sweden	17.600	2	
14	Denmark	15.748	2	
-	Wales	15.000	0	

Rank	Association	Coeff.	Teams	Notes
15	Switzerland	15.000	2	
16	Czechoslovakia	14.600	2	
17	Poland	14.250	2	
18	Greece	13.000	2	
19	England	12.500	2	
20	Bulgaria	12.416	2	
21	Turkey	11.665	2	
22	Finland	10.415	1	
23	Hungary	10.250	1	
24	Albania	8.999	0	
25	Norway	5.999	1	
26	Cyprus	4.666	1	
27	Iceland	4.000	1	
28	Northern Ireland	3.666	1	
29	Republic of Ireland	1.999	1	
30	Luxembourg	1.998	1	
31	Malta	1.666	1	
-	Slovenia	0.000	1	

Unranked countries entered in other European competitions
Association	EC	CWC
Estonia	Yes	No
Faroe Islands	Yes	Yes
Israel	Yes	Yes
Latvia	Yes	No
Liechtenstein	No	Yes
Lithuania	Yes	No
Ukraine	Yes	Yes

Wales: There was no national league in Wales before 1992 and the only competition organised by the Football Association of Wales was the Welsh Cup, so Wales had just a single participant in European competitions, the winner (or best-placed Welsh team as several English teams also competed) of the Welsh Cup, which competed in the UEFA Cup Winners' Cup. Its virtual ranking is only an original research, because the UEFA country ranking was only used to allocate the UEFA Cup spots at time, so Wales was not included.
East Germany: The slots previously allocated to East Germany did not apply due to the reunification of Germany, and the end of the NOFV-Oberliga the previous year. It was the first time a country disappeared since the introduction of the UEFA ranking, requiring an unprecedented decision. As two spots vacated, UEFA no more considered East Germany. Consequently, Turkey moved to the additional spot zone, and another place became available at the bottom of the list for the title holders. As the latter was not needed, it was given to a new country, Slovenia.
Soviet Union, Russia & Ukraine: The Soviet Union was formally dissolved shortly after the end of the 1991 Soviet Top League. Following an agreement between Russia, Ukraine and UEFA, Ukraine relinquished all Soviet football heritage to Russia, that in turn immediately accepted a separate Ukrainian representation in the UEFA Champions League and the Cup Winners' Cup through the 1992 Vyshcha Liha and the 1992 Ukrainian Cup. On the other hand, the UEFA Cup slots were still awarded through the Soviet League results, although teams would compete for their own associations. After the results of the Ukrainian competitions, two Russian sides and one Ukrainian side took the Soviet spots.
Albania: All Albanian clubs were excluded from European competitions for the 1992–93 season, after the political situation in Albania collapsed and the national team could not complete the UEFA Euro 1992 qualifying. Their berth in the UEFA Cup was allocated as a third berth to association 9, Scotland. In Albania, Partizani would have qualified for the UEFA Cup.
Yugoslavia: One week after the 1991-92 Yugoslav First League was finished, Yugoslavia was disqualified from European club competitions, after a United Nations ban due to the breakup of the country and the ensuing warfare there. Their two slots in the UEFA Cup were allocated as a third berth for associations 11-12, namely Romania and Austria. In Yugoslavia, Vojvodina and OFK Beograd would have qualified by league position.

=== Teams ===
The labels in parentheses show how each team qualified for competition:

- TH: Title holders
- CW: Cup winners
- CR: Cup runners-up
- LC: League Cup winners
- 2nd, 3rd, 4th, 5th, 6th, etc.: League position
- P-W: End-of-season European competition play-offs winners

Qualified teams for 1992–93 UEFA Cup
(Italy) Juventus (2nd)	(Italy) Torino (3rd)	(Italy) Napoli (4th)	(Italy) Roma (5th)
(Germany) Borussia Dortmund (2nd)	(Germany) Eintracht Frankfurt (3rd)	(Germany) Köln (4th)	(Germany) Kaiserslautern (5th)
(Spain) Real Madrid (2nd)	(Spain) Valencia (4th)	(Spain) Real Sociedad (5th)	(Spain) Zaragoza (6th)
(France) Paris Saint-Germain (3rd)	(France) Auxerre (4th)	(France) Caen (5th)	(Belgium) Anderlecht (2nd)
(Belgium) Standard Liège (3rd)	(Belgium) Mechelen (4th)	(Portugal) Benfica (2nd)	(Portugal) Sporting CP (4th)
(Portugal) Vitória de Guimarães (5th)	(Netherlands) Ajax (2nd)^{TH}	(Netherlands) Vitesse (4th)	(Netherlands) Groningen (5th)
(Russia) Torpedo Moscow (3rd)	(Ukraine) Dynamo Kyiv (5th)	(Russia) Dynamo Moscow (6th)	(Scotland) Heart of Midlothian (2nd)
(Scotland) Celtic (3rd)	(Scotland) Hibernian (LC)	(Romania) Electroputere Craiova (3rd)	(Romania) Universitatea Craiova (4th)
(Romania) Politehnica Timișoara (5th)	Austria Salzburg (2nd)	(Austria) Wacker Innsbruck (3rd)	(Austria) Rapid Wien (5th)
(Sweden) Norrköping (2nd)	(Sweden) Örebro (3rd)	(Denmark) Copenhagen (2nd)	(Denmark) Frem (3rd)
(Switzerland) Neuchâtel Xamax (2nd)	(Switzerland) Grasshopper (3rd)	(Czechoslovakia) Sigma Olomouc (3rd)	(Czechoslovakia) Slavia Prague (4th)
(Poland) GKS Katowice (2nd)	(Poland) Widzew Łódź (3rd)	(Greece) Panathinaikos (3rd)	(Greece) PAOK (4th)
(England) Manchester United (2nd)	(England) Sheffield Wednesday (3rd)	(Bulgaria) Lokomotiv Plovdiv (3rd)	(Bulgaria) Botev Plovdiv (4th)
(Turkey) Fenerbahçe (2nd)	(Turkey) Galatasaray (3rd)	(Finland) MP Mikkeli (2nd)	(Hungary) Vác (2nd)
(Norway) Rosenborg (2nd)	(Cyprus) Anorthosis (2nd)	(Iceland) Fram (2nd)	(Northern Ireland) Portadown (2nd)
(Republic of Ireland) Derry City (2nd)	Spora Luxembourg (3rd)	(Malta) Floriana (2nd)	(Slovenia) Izola (3rd)

Notes

1. Russia/Ukraine: As per the original agreement between Russia and Ukraine after the dissolution of the Soviet Union, teams qualified for the UEFA Cup through the 1991 Soviet Top League would compete for their own federations, with two Ukrainian sides and one Russian side, while Ukraine was allowed to obtain a place of their own for the UEFA Champions League and the European Cup Winners' Cup. Chornomorets, one of the Ukrainian sides that had qualified for the UEFA Cup, won the 1992 Ukrainian Cup and entered the European Cup Winners' Cup, relinquishing the spot to the next best non-qualified team. This was Dynamo Moscow, giving Russia a second team along a single Ukrainian side.
2. Austria: FC Swarovski Tirol qualified for the UEFA Cup, but the team was dissolved and its licence in the Austrian Football Bundesliga was taken by Wacker Innsbruck. While considered a new team, Wacker Innsbruck retained the UEFA Cup placing, effectively reversing the events of 1986.

== Schedule ==
The schedule of the competition was as follows. Matches were scheduled for Tuesdays, Wednesdays and Thursdays, with the first four rounds effectively splitting matches across all three days. The first leg of the semi-finals was played on a Tuesday, while the second leg was played on a Tuesday and a Thursday, but the final was still played on Wednesdays.

Schedule for 1992–93 UEFA Cup
Round	First leg	Second leg
First round	15–17 September 1992	29 September – 1 October 1992
Second round	20–22 October 1992	3–5 November 1992
Third round	24–26 November 1992	8–10 December 1992
Quarter-finals	2–4 March 1993	16–18 March 1993
Semi-finals	6 April 1993	20–22 April 1993
Final	5 May 1993	19 May 1993

== First round ==
Team 1	Agg.	Team 2	1st leg	2nd leg
Köln (Germany)	2–3	(Scotland) Celtic	2–0	0–3
Dynamo Moscow (Russia)	5–3	(Norway) Rosenborg	5–1	0–2
Electroputere Craiova (Romania)	0–10	(Greece) Panathinaikos	0–6	0–4
Dynamo Kyiv (Ukraine)	3–3 (a)	(Austria) Rapid Wien	1–0	2–3
Copenhagen (Denmark)	10–1	(Finland) MP Mikkeli	5–0	5–1
Wacker Innsbruck (Austria)	1–5	(Italy) Roma	1–4	0–1
Politehnica Timișoara (Romania)	1–5	(Spain) Real Madrid	1–1	0–4
Fenerbahçe (Turkey)	5–3	(Bulgaria) Botev Plovdiv	3–1	2–2
Floriana (Malta)	2–8	(Germany) Borussia Dortmund	0–1	2–7
GKS Katowice (Poland)	1–2	(Turkey) Galatasaray	0–0	1–2
Grasshopper (Switzerland)	4–3	(Portugal) Sporting CP	1–2	3–1 (a.e.t.)
Hibernian (Scotland)	3–3 (a)	(Belgium) Anderlecht	2–2	1–1
IFK Norrköping (Sweden)	1–3	(Italy) Torino	1–0	0–3
Juventus (Italy)	10–1	(Cyprus) Anorthosis	6–1	4–0
Fram (Iceland)	0–7	(Germany) Kaiserslautern	0–3	0–4
Manchester United (England)	0–0 (3–4 p)	(Russia) Torpedo Moscow	0–0	0–0 (a.e.t.)
Neuchâtel Xamax (Switzerland)	3–6	(Denmark) BK Frem	2–2	1–4
Paris Saint-Germain (France)	5–0	(Greece) PAOK	2–0	3–0^{1}
Lokomotiv Plovdiv (Bulgaria)	3–9	(France) Auxerre	2–2	1–7
Casino Salzburg (Austria)	1–6	(Netherlands) Ajax	0–3	1–3
Sheffield Wednesday (England)	10–2	Spora Luxembourg	8–1	2–1
Sigma Olomouc (Czechoslovakia)	3–1	(Romania) Universitatea Craiova	1–0	2–1
Slavia Prague (Czechoslovakia)	3–4	(Scotland) Heart of Midlothian	1–0	2–4
Benfica (Portugal)	8–0	(Slovenia) Belvedur Izola	3–0	5–0
Caen (France)	3–4	(Spain) Zaragoza	3–2	0–2
Standard Liège (Belgium)	5–0	(Northern Ireland) Portadown	5–0	0–0
Vác (Hungary)	2–1	(Netherlands) Groningen	1–0	1–1
Valencia (Spain)	1–6	(Italy) Napoli	1–5	0–1
Vitesse (Netherlands)	5–1	(Republic of Ireland) Derry City	3–0	2–1
Vítoria de Guimarães (Portugal)	3–2	(Spain) Real Sociedad	3–0	0–2
Widzew Łódź (Poland)	2–11	(Germany) Eintracht Frankfurt	2–2	0–9
Mechelen (Belgium)	2–1	(Sweden) Örebro	2–1	0–0

^{1}: The match was stopped in the 51st minute, while Paris Saint-Germain were leading by 2–0, due to incidents in the stands. Paris Saint-Germain were later awarded a 0–3 walkover win by UEFA.

=== First leg ===
15 September 1992
15:30

Floriana (Malta)	0–1	(Germany) Borussia Dortmund
	Report	Rummenigge 21'

National Stadium, Ta' Qali
Attendance: 1,929
Referee: Andreas Georgiou (Cyprus)

15 September 1992
15:30

Fram (Iceland)	0–3	(Germany) Kaiserslautern
	Report	Witeczek 29', 66'; Wagner 64'

Laugardalsvöllur, Reykjavík
Attendance: 585
Referee: Thorbjørn Aas (Norway)

15 September 1992
18:00

Köln (Germany)	2–0	(Scotland) Celtic
Jensen 25'; Ordenewitz 82'	Report

Müngersdorfer Stadion, Cologne
Attendance: 26,000
Referee: Vadim Zhuk (Belarus)

15 September 1992
20:00

Hibernian (Scotland)	2–2	(Belgium) Anderlecht
Beaumont 4'; Evans 80'	Report	Degryse 37' (pen.); Van Vossen 67'

Easter Road, Edinburgh
Attendance: 14,213
Referee: Hans-Jürgen Weber (Germany)

15 September 1992
20:00

Neuchâtel Xamax (Switzerland)	2–2	(Denmark) BK Frem
Sutter 51'; Manfreda 52'	Report	Mikkelsen 17'; Czakon 22'

Stade de la Maladière, Neuchâtel
Attendance: 4,000
Referee: Marc Batta (France)

15 September 1992
20:45

Caen (France)	3–2	(Spain) Zaragoza
Paille 6', 37'; Gravelaine 15'	Report	Sanjuán 31'; Pardeza 79'

Stade de Venoix, Caen
Attendance: 5,134
Referee: Kurt Röthlisberger (Switzerland)

16 September 1992
15:00

Fenerbahçe (Turkey)	3–1	(Bulgaria) Botev Plovdiv
Kocaman 14', 38'; Çolak 54' (pen.)	Report	Dermendzhiev 51'

Şükrü Saracoğlu Stadium, Istanbul
Attendance: 12,382
Referee: Wieland Ziller (Germany)

16 September 1992
15:00

Vác (Hungary)	1–0	(Netherlands) Groningen
Füle 27'	Report

Vác Városi Stadion, Vác
Attendance: 1,650
Referee: Gheorghe Ionescu (Romania)

16 September 1992
15:30

Widzew Łódź (Poland)	2–2	(Germany) Eintracht Frankfurt
Jóźwiak 19'; Koniarek 26'	Report	Yeboah 68'; Wolf 84'

Stadion Miejski Widzewa, Łódź
Attendance: 7,600
Referee: Sadık Deda (Turkey)

16 September 1992
16:00

Electroputere Craiova (Romania)	0–6	(Greece) Panathinaikos
	Report	Antoniou 7'; Warzycha 38', 53', 66'; Marangos 70'; Kalantzis 85'

Stadionul Central, Craiova
Attendance: 2,500
Referee: Zbigniew Przesmycki (Poland)

16 September 1992
16:00

Sigma Olomouc (Czechoslovakia)	1–0	(Romania) Universitatea Craiova
Čapka 87'	Report

Stadion Míru, Olomouc
Attendance: 6,129
Referee: Kaj Natri (Finland)

16 September 1992
16:30

Politehnica Timișoara (Romania)	1–1	(Spain) Real Madrid
Cuc 61'	Report	Alfonso 15'

Stadionul Silviu Bindea, Timișoara
Attendance: 8,250
Referee: Ryszard Wójcik (Poland)

16 September 1992
16:30

Lokomotiv Plovdiv (Bulgaria)	2–2	(France) Auxerre
Sadakov 33' (pen.); Vidolov 58'	Report	Baticle 4'; Cocard 73'

Stadion Lokomotiv, Plovdiv
Attendance: 4,000
Referee: Fabio Baldas (Italy)

16 September 1992
17:00

Dynamo Moscow (Russia)	5–1	(Norway) Rosenborg
Sklyarov 34', 62'; Timofeev 46'; Simutenkov 57'; Tetradze 68'	Report	Løken 75'

Central Dynamo Stadium, Moscow
Attendance: 7,250
Referee: Karel Bohuněk (Czechoslovakia)

16 September 1992
18:00

Dynamo Kyiv (Ukraine)	1–0	(Austria) Rapid Wien
Yakovenko 46'	Report

Republican Stadium, Kyiv
Attendance: 17,000
Referee: Antonio Martín Navarrete (Spain)

16 September 1992
18:00

Slavia Prague (Czechoslovakia)	1–0	(Scotland) Heart of Midlothian
Tatarchuk 85'	Report

Stadion Eden, Prague
Attendance: 4,549
Referee: Sergei Khusainov (Russia)

16 September 1992
19:00

IFK Norrköping (Sweden)	1–0	(Italy) Torino
Blohm 82'	Report

Norrköpings Idrottspark, Norrköping
Attendance: 8,605
Referee: Peter Mikkelsen (Denmark)

16 September 1992
19:00

Juventus (Italy)	6–1	(Cyprus) Anorthosis Famagusta
R. Baggio 4'; Möller 11'; Vialli 43', 62'; Conte 45'; Torricelli 75'	Report	Ketsbaia 84'

Stadio Delle Alpi, Turin
Attendance: 4,743
Referee: László Molnár (Hungary)

16 September 1992
19:15

Casino Salzburg (Austria)	0–3	(Netherlands) Ajax
	Report	Davids 53'; Overmars 65'; Kreek 80'

Stadion Lehen, Salzburg
Attendance: 7,592
Referee: Pierluigi Pairetto (Italy)

16 September 1992
19:30

Copenhagen (Denmark)	5–0	(Finland) MP
Mi. Johansen 12', 53'; Uldbjerg 29'; Højer Nielsen 69' (pen.); Larsen 86'	Report

Parken Stadium, Copenhagen
Attendance: 8,430
Referee: Marek Kowalczyk (Poland)

16 September 1992
19:30

Mechelen (Belgium)	2–1	(Sweden) Örebro
Eijkelkamp 32'; De Boeck 63'	Report	Millqvist 83'

Achter de Kazerne, Mechelen
Attendance: 4,400
Referee: Francesco Bianchi (Switzerland)

16 September 1992
20:00

GKS Katowice (Poland)	0–0	(Turkey) Galatasaray
	Report

Stadion GKS Katowice, Chorzów
Attendance: 2,610
Referee: Mircea Salomir (Romania)

16 September 1992
20:00

Grasshopper (Switzerland)	1–2	(Portugal) Sporting CP
Sutter 36' (pen.)	Report	Balakov 44'; Juskowiak 83'

Hardturm, Zürich
Attendance: 13,700
Referee: Philippe Leduc (France)

16 September 1992
20:00

Vitesse (Netherlands)	3–0	(Republic of Ireland) Derry City
Van den Brom 20', 55'; Van Arum 90'	Report

Nieuw-Monnikenhuize, Arnhem
Attendance: 5,692
Referee: João Pinto Correia (Portugal)

16 September 1992
20:15

Standard Liège (Belgium)	5–0	(Northern Ireland) Portadown
Asselman 8', 45'; Goossens 52', 65'; Léonard 55'	Report

Stade Maurice Dufrasne, Liège
Attendance: 9,428
Referee: Haim Lipkovitz (Israel)

16 September 1992
20:30

Wacker Innsbruck (Austria)	1–4	(Italy) Roma
Baur 34'	Report	Giannini 15', 41'; Caniggia 20'; Muzzi 70'

Tivoli-Stadion, Innsbruck
Attendance: 8,300
Referee: Manuel Díaz Vega (Spain)

16 September 1992
20:30

Paris Saint-Germain (France)	2–0	(Greece) PAOK
Weah 13', 24'	Report

Parc des Princes, Paris
Attendance: 18,876
Referee: Brian McGinlay (Scotland)

16 September 1992
20:45

Sheffield Wednesday (England)	8–1	Spora Luxembourg
Waddle 9'; Anderson 23', 29'; Warhurst 31', 73'; Bart-Williams 60', 81'; Worthington 65'	Report	Cruz 11'

Hillsborough Stadium, Sheffield
Attendance: 19,792
Referee: Freddy Philippoz (Switzerland)

16 September 1992
21:05

Manchester United (England)	0–0	(Russia) Torpedo Moscow
	Report

Old Trafford, Manchester
Attendance: 19,998
Referee: Aron Schmidhuber (Germany)

16 September 1992
22:00

Benfica (Portugal)	3–0	(Slovenia) Belvedur Izola
Paneira 42', 73'; William 44' (pen.)	Report

Estádio da Luz, Lisbon
Attendance: 12,000
Referee: Periklis Vasilakis (Greece)

16 September 1992
22:00

Valencia (Spain)	1–5	(Italy) Napoli
Roberto 54'	Report	Fonseca 21', 60', 64', 87', 90'

Estadio Luis Casanova, Valencia
Attendance: 19,000
Referee: Hubert Forstinger (Austria)

17 September 1992
20:30

Vitória de Guimarães (Portugal)	3–0	(Spain) Real Sociedad
Kuprešanin 14', 76'; Barbosa 28'	Report

Estádio D. Afonso Henriques, Guimarães
Attendance: 6,000
Referee: Sándor Puhl (Hungary)

=== Second leg ===
29 September 1992
13:00

Galatasaray (Turkey)	2–1	(Poland) GKS Katowice
Şükür 30'; Götz 55' (pen.)	Report	Maciejewski 73'

Ali Sami Yen Stadium, Istanbul
Attendance: 21,460
Referee: Rodger Gifford (Wales)

Galatasaray won 2–1 on aggregate.

29 September 1992
15:15

Torpedo Moscow (Russia)	0–0 (a.e.t.)	(England) Manchester United
	Report
Penalties
Borisov (penalty missed); Afanasyev (penalty missed); Chugainov (penalty scored); Ulyanov (penalty scored); Arefyev (penalty scored); Grishin (penalty scored)	4–3	(penalty scored) Ince; (penalty scored) Irwin; (penalty missed) Bruce; (penalty missed) McClair; (penalty scored) Robson; (penalty missed) Pallister

Eduard Streltsov Stadium, Moscow
Attendance: 11,357
Referee: Jan Damgaard (Denmark)

0–0 on aggregate. Torpedo Moscow won 4–3 on penalties.

29 September 1992
18:00

Borussia Dortmund (Germany)	7–2	(Malta) Floriana
Zorc 8'; Delia 19' (o.g.); Franck 58'; Rummenigge 66'; Mill 72', 80', 90'	Report	Crawley 11', 18'

Westfalenstadion, Dortmund
Attendance: 11,790
Referee: Denis McArdle (Republic of Ireland)

Borussia Dortmund won 8–2 on aggregate.

29 September 1992
19:00

Anorthosis Famagusta (Cyprus)	0–4	(Italy) Juventus
	Report	Ravanelli 14'; Kohler 39'; Casiraghi 66', 89'

Antonis Papadopoulos Stadium, Larnaca
Attendance: 4,500
Referee: Brian Hill (England)

Juventus won 10–1 on aggregate.

29 September 1992
19:00

BK Frem (Denmark)	4–1	(Switzerland) Neuchâtel Xamax
Haren 15', 33'; H. Jensen 17' (pen.); Thøgersen 54'	Report	Manfreda 22'

Valby Idrætspark, Copenhagen
Attendance: 3,476
Referee: Marnix Sandra (Belgium)

BK Frem won 6–3 on aggregate.

29 September 1992
20:00

Anderlecht (Belgium)	1–1	(Scotland) Hibernian
Nilis 4'	Report	D. Jackson 15'

Stade Constant Vanden Stock, Brussels
Attendance: 22,000
Referee: Antonio Martín Navarrete (Spain)

3–3 on aggregate. Anderlecht won on away goals.

29 September 1992
20:15

Kaiserslautern (Germany)	4–0	(Iceland) Fram
Kuntz 31', 84'; Witeczek 56', 77'	Report

Fritz-Walter-Stadion, Kaiserslautern
Attendance: 23,197
Referee: Juan Ansuátegui Roca (Spain)

Kaiserslautern won 7–0 on aggregate.

29 September 1992
20:30

Derry City (Republic of Ireland)	1–2	(Netherlands) Vitesse
Mooney 60'	Report	Straal 44'; Laamers 65'

Brandywell Stadium, Derry
Attendance: 3,500
Referee: Gylfi Orrason (Iceland)

Vitesse won 5–1 on aggregate.

29 September 1992
20:45

Auxerre (France)	7–1	(Bulgaria) Lokomotiv Plovdiv
Baticle 2', 66'; Cocard 11'; Prunier 12', 48'; Vahirua 26'; Laslandes 80'	Report	Sadakov 22'

Stade de l'Abbé-Deschamps, Auxerre
Attendance: 7,000
Referee: Keith Burge (Wales)

Auxerre won 9–3 on aggregate.

29 September 1992
21:00

Real Madrid (Spain)	4–0	(Romania) Politehnica Timișoara
Alfonso 28'; Luis Enrique 57'; Esnáider 65'; Míchel 87'	Report

Estadio Santiago Bernabéu, Madrid
Attendance: 18,000
Referee: Martin Bodenham (England)

Real Madrid won 5–1 on aggregate.

29 September 1992
21:00

Portadown (Northern Ireland)	0–0	(Belgium) Standard Liège
	Report

Shamrock Park, Portadown
Attendance: 1,010
Referee: Georges Ramos (France)

Standard Liège won 5–0 on aggregate.

30 September 1992
13:30

Botev Plovdiv (Bulgaria)	2–2	(Turkey) Fenerbahçe
Iskrenov 5'; Petrov 41'	Report	Dilmen 36', 77'

Stadion Hristo Botev, Plovdiv
Attendance: 8,000
Referee: Michał Listkiewicz (Poland)

Fenerbahçe won 5–3 on aggregate.

30 September 1992
14:00

Ajax (Netherlands)	3–1	(Austria) Casino Salzburg
Pettersson 26', 78'; Bergkamp 49'	Report	Reisinger 57'

Olympisch Stadion, Amsterdam
Attendance: 17,000
Referee: Andrew Waddell (Scotland)

Ajax won 6–1 on aggregate.

30 September 1992
14:30

Universitatea Craiova (Romania)	1–2	(Czechoslovakia) Sigma Olomouc
Gane 21'	Report	Kerbr 23', 42'

Stadionul Central, Craiova
Attendance: 5,298
Referee: Egil Nervik (Norway)

Sigma Olomouc won 3–1 on aggregate.

30 September 1992
16:00

Belvedur Izola (Slovenia)	0–5	(Portugal) Benfica
	Report	Pacheco 20', 46', 65'; João Pinto 57'; César Brito 87'

Mestni stadion Izola, Izola
Attendance: 4,000
Referee: Jaap Uilenberg (Netherlands)

Benfica won 8–0 on aggregate.

30 September 1992
17:30

MP (Finland)	1–5	(Denmark) Copenhagen
Allen 64'	Report	Højer Nielsen 8'; Ma. Johansen 18', 32'; Uldbjerg 45'; Rasmussen 82'

Mikkelin urheilupuisto, Mikkeli
Attendance: 971
Referee: Nikolai Levnikov (Russia)

Copenhagen won 10–1 on aggregate.

30 September 1992
18:00

Eintracht Frankfurt (Germany)	9–0	(Poland) Widzew Łódź
Kruse 8', 14', 37'; Yeboah 21', 22', 36', 69'; Rahn 83'; Bein 89'	Report

Waldstadion, Frankfurt am Main
Attendance: 11,200
Referee: Leslie Mottram (Scotland)

Eintracht Frankfurt won 11–2 on aggregate.

30 September 1992
19:00

Rosenborg (Norway)	2–0	(Russia) Dynamo Moscow
Ingebrigtsen 8'; Løken 47'	Report

Lerkendal Stadion, Trondheim
Attendance: 10,218
Referee: Keith Cooper (Wales)

Dynamo Moscow won 5–3 on aggregate.

30 September 1992
19:00

Panathinaikos (Greece)	4–0	(Romania) Electroputere Craiova
Saravakos 43'; Warzycha 58'; Kalantzis 67'; Frantzeskos 82'	Report

O.A.K.A., Athens
Attendance: 9,858
Referee: Alphonse Constantin (Belgium)

Panathinaikos won 10–0 on aggregate.

30 September 1992
19:00

Roma (Italy)	1–0	(Austria) Wacker Innsbruck
Häßler 51'	Report

Stadio Olimpico, Rome
Attendance: 23,093
Referee: Leif Sundell (Sweden)

Roma won 5–1 on aggregate.

30 September 1992
19:00

Örebro (Sweden)	0–0	(Belgium) Mechelen
	Report

Eyravallen, Örebro
Attendance: 5,085
Referee: Svend Erik Christensen (Denmark)

Mechelen won 2–1 on aggregate.

30 September 1992
19:30

Groningen (Netherlands)	1–1	(Hungary) Vác
Huizingh 57'	Report	Füle 44'

Stadion Oosterpark, Groningen
Attendance: 10,741
Referee: Esa Palsi (Finland)

Vác won 2–1 on aggregate.

30 September 1992
19:30

Real Sociedad (Spain)	2–0	(Portugal) Vitória de Guimarães
Lumbreras 6'; Fuentes 23'	Report

Atotxa, San Sebastián
Attendance: 12,432
Referee: Joël Quiniou (France)

Vitória de Guimarães won 3–2 on aggregate.

30 September 1992
19:35

Rapid Wien (Austria)	3–2	(Ukraine) Dynamo Kyiv
Mandreko 8'; Fjørtoft 15', 38'	Report	Leonenko 45' (pen.), 87'

Gerhard-Hanappi-Stadion, Vienna
Attendance: 16,000
Referee: Piero Ceccarini (Italy)

3–3 on aggregate. Dynamo Kyiv won on away goals.

30 September 1992
20:30

Celtic (Scotland)	3–0	(Germany) Köln
McStay 36'; Creaney 38'; Collins 81'	Report

Celtic Park, Glasgow
Attendance: 30,747
Referee: Guy Goethals (Belgium)

Celtic won 3–2 on aggregate.

30 September 1992
20:30

Heart of Midlothian (Scotland)	4–2	(Czechoslovakia) Slavia Prague
Mackay 10'; Baird 21'; Levein 42'; Snodin 79'	Report	Šilhavý 14'; Kuka 65'

Tynecastle Park, Edinburgh
Attendance: 16,154
Referee: Rune Larsson (Sweden)

Heart of Midlothian won 4–3 on aggregate.

30 September 1992
20:30

Napoli (Italy)	1–0	(Spain) Valencia
Fonseca 9'	Report

Stadio San Paolo, Naples
Attendance: 22,876
Referee: Bo Karlsson (Sweden)

Napoli won 6–1 on aggregate.

30 September 1992
22:30

Sporting CP (Portugal)	1–3 (a.e.t.)	(Switzerland) Grasshopper
Cadete 84'	Report	Élber 31', 110'; Magnin 83'

Estádio José Alvalade, Lisbon
Attendance: 35,000
Referee: Hellmut Krug (Germany)

Grasshopper won 4–3 on aggregate.

1 October 1992
20:00

Spora Luxembourg	1–2	(England) Sheffield Wednesday
Cruz 20'	Report	Watson 18'; Warhurst 36'

Stade Municipal, Luxembourg
Attendance: 2,379
Referee: Guðmundur Maríasson (Iceland)

Sheffield Wednesday won 10–2 on aggregate.

1 October 1992
20:30

Torino (Italy)	3–0	(Sweden) IFK Norrköping
Bruno 2'; Casagrande 77'; Aguilera 80'	Report

Stadio delle Alpi, Turin
Attendance: 17,783
Referee: Aleksey Spirin (Russia)

Torino won 3–1 on aggregate.

1 October 1992
20:30

PAOK (Greece)	0–3	(France) Paris Saint-Germain
	Report

Toumba Stadium, Thessaloniki
Attendance: 20,000
Referee: John Blankenstein (Netherlands)

Match abandoned after 51 minutes due to fan trouble with Paris Saint-Germain leading 2–0 (Weah 15', Sassus 32'), game awarded 3–0 to Paris Saint-Germain. Paris Saint-Germain won 5–0 on aggregate.

1 October 1992
21:00

Zaragoza (Spain)	2–0	(France) Caen
Brehme 24'; Poyet 64'	Report

La Romareda, Zaragoza
Attendance: 15,000
Referee: Howard King (Wales)

Zaragoza won 4–3 on aggregate.

== Second round ==
Team 1	Agg.	Team 2	1st leg	2nd leg
Kaiserslautern (Germany)	5–3	(England) Sheffield Wednesday	3–1	2–2
Roma (Italy)	6–4	(Switzerland) Grasshopper	3–0	3–4
Auxerre (France)	7–0	(Denmark) Copenhagen	5–0	2–0
BK Frem (Denmark)	1–6	(Spain) Zaragoza	0–1	1–5
Borussia Dortmund (Germany)	3–1	(Scotland) Celtic	1–0	2–1
Eintracht Frankfurt (Germany)	0–1	(Turkey) Galatasaray	0–0	0–1
Fenerbahçe (Turkey)	2–7	(Czechoslovakia) Sigma Olomouc	1–0	1–7
Heart of Midlothian (Scotland)	0–2	(Belgium) Standard Liège	0–1	0–1
Panathinaikos (Greece)	0–1	(Italy) Juventus	0–1	0–0
Napoli (Italy)	0–2	(France) Paris Saint-Germain	0–2	0–0
Anderlecht (Belgium)	7–2	(Ukraine) Dynamo Kyiv	4–2	3–0
Real Madrid (Spain)	7–5	(Russia) Torpedo Moscow	5–2	2–3
Benfica (Portugal)	6–1	(Hungary) Vác	5–1	1–0
Torino (Italy)	1–2	(Russia) Dynamo Moscow	1–2	0–0
Vitesse (Netherlands)	2–0	(Belgium) Mechelen	1–0	1–0
Vítoria de Guimarães (Portugal)	1–5	(Netherlands) Ajax	0–3	1–2

=== First leg ===
20 October 1992
18:15

Kaiserslautern (Germany)	3–1	(England) Sheffield Wednesday
Funkel 7' (pen.); Marin 51'; Witeczek 53'	Report	Hirst 5'

Fritz-Walter-Stadion, Kaiserslautern
Attendance: 20,802
Referee: Joël Quiniou (France)

20 October 1992
20:15

Borussia Dortmund (Germany)	1–0	(Scotland) Celtic
Chapuisat 71'	Report

Westfalenstadion, Dortmund
Attendance: 35,803
Referee: Ion Crăciunescu (Romania)

20 October 1992
20:15

Panathinaikos (Greece)	0–1	(Italy) Juventus
	Report	Platt 68'

O.A.K.A., Athens
Attendance: 69,767
Referee: Bo Karlsson (Sweden)

21 October 1992
17:30

Fenerbahçe (Turkey)	1–0	(Czechoslovakia) Sigma Olomouc
Kartal 36' (pen.)	Report

Şükrü Saracoğlu Stadium, Istanbul
Attendance: 32,195
Referee: Luben Spasov (Bulgaria)

21 October 1992
19:00

Roma (Italy)	3–0	(Switzerland) Grasshopper
Carnevale 18'; Rizzitelli 25'; Giannini 42'	Report

Stadio Olimpico, Rome
Attendance: 31,034
Referee: Heinz Holzmann (Austria)

21 October 1992
19:45

Anderlecht (Belgium)	4–2	(Ukraine) Dynamo Kyiv
Nilis 24'; Degryse 37'; Versavel 51' van Vossen 60'	Report	Shkapenko 20'; Leonenko 54'

Stade Constant Vanden Stock, Brussels
Attendance: 17,000
Referee: Frederick McKnight (Northern Ireland)

21 October 1992
20:00

Vitesse (Netherlands)	1–0	(Belgium) Mechelen
van den Brom 32'	Report

Nieuw-Monnikenhuize, Arnhem
Attendance: 9,499
Referee: Juan Ansuátegui Roca (Spain)

21 October 1992
20:15

Eintracht Frankfurt (Germany)	0–0	(Turkey) Galatasaray
	Report

Waldstadion, Frankfurt am Main
Attendance: 40,802
Referee: Brian McGinlay (Scotland)

21 October 1992
20:15

Vitória de Guimarães (Portugal)	0–3	(Netherlands) Ajax
	Report	Davids 1'; Pettersson 37'; Bergkamp 48'

Estádio D. Afonso Henriques, Guimarães
Attendance: 8,000
Referee: Václav Krondl (Czechoslovakia)

21 October 1992
20:30

Heart of Midlothian (Scotland)	0–1	(Belgium) Standard Liège
	Report	Bettagno 7'

Tynecastle Park, Edinburgh
Attendance: 16,897
Referee: Gerhard Kapl (Austria)

21 October 1992
20:30

Napoli (Italy)	0–2	(France) Paris Saint-Germain
	Report	Weah 16', 35'

Stadio San Paolo, Naples
Attendance: 35,378
Referee: Karl-Josef Assenmacher (Germany)

21 October 1992
20:45

Auxerre (France)	5–0	(Denmark) Copenhagen
Baticle 15', 40', 80'; Martins 53'; Otokoré 90'	Report

Stade de l'Abbé-Deschamps, Auxerre
Attendance: 9,597
Referee: László Vágner (Hungary)

21 October 1992
21:00

Real Madrid (Spain)	5–2	(Russia) Torpedo Moscow
Hierro 8', 28', 32'; Zamorano 52'; Míchel 85' (pen.)	Report	Shustikov 36'; Grishin 39'

Estadio Santiago Bernabéu, Madrid
Attendance: 43,000
Referee: Frans Van Den Wijngaert (Belgium)

21 October 1992
22:00

Benfica (Portugal)	5–1	(Hungary) Vác
Yuran 42'; Isaías 55', 85'; Pacheco 58' (pen.); William 79' (pen.)	Report	Szedlacsek 82'

Estádio da Luz, Lisbon
Attendance: 21,000
Referee: Ryszard Wójcik (Poland)

22 October 1992
19:00

BK Frem (Denmark)	0–1	(Spain) Zaragoza
	Report	Poyet 12'

Valby Idrætspark, Copenhagen
Attendance: 2,852
Referee: Andrew Waddell (Scotland)

22 October 1992
20:30

Torino (Italy)	1–2	(Russia) Dynamo Moscow
Timofeev 56' (o.g.)	Report	Qasımov 45'; Simutenkov 69'

Stadio delle Alpi, Turin
Attendance: 26,943
Referee: Hellmut Krug (Germany)

=== Second leg ===
3 November 1992
20:00

Mechelen (Belgium)	0–1	(Netherlands) Vitesse
	Report	Cocu 74'

Achter de Kazerne, Mechelen
Attendance: 8,000
Referee: Arie Frost (Israel)

Vitesse won 2–0 on aggregate.

3 November 1992
20:30

Celtic (Scotland)	1–2	(Germany) Borussia Dortmund
Creaney 13'	Report	Chapuisat 53'; Zorc 58'

Celtic Park, Glasgow
Attendance: 31,578
Referee: Leif Sundell (Sweden)

Borussia Dortmund won 3–1 on aggregate.

3 November 1992
21:00

Zaragoza (Spain)	5–1	(Denmark) BK Frem
Mateuț 8', 39', 83'; Seba 40', 67'	Report	Colding 74'

La Romareda, Zaragoza
Attendance: 4,800
Referee: Arturo Martino (Switzerland)

Zaragoza won 6–1 on aggregate.

4 November 1992
12:00

Galatasaray (Turkey)	1–0	(Germany) Eintracht Frankfurt
Tütüneker 6'	Report

Ali Sami Yen Stadium, Istanbul
Attendance: 29,546
Referee: Pierluigi Pairetto (Italy)

Galatasaray won 1–0 on aggregate.

4 November 1992
14:00

Sigma Olomouc (Czechoslovakia)	7–1	(Turkey) Fenerbahçe
Hanuš 9' (pen.), 90'; Kerbr 12'; Barbořík 34'; Maroši 51'; Fiala 76'; Vaďura 80'	Report	Kocaman 38'

Andrův stadion, Olomouc
Attendance: 10,152
Referee: Jorge Coroado (Portugal)

Sigma Olomouc won 7–2 on aggregate.

4 November 1992
17:00

Copenhagen (Denmark)	0–2	(France) Auxerre
	Report	Cocard 64'; Bonalair 88'

Parken Stadium, Copenhagen
Attendance: 5,061
Referee: Philip Don (England)

Auxerre won 7–0 on aggregate.

4 November 1992
17:00

Torpedo Moscow (Russia)	3–2	(Spain) Real Madrid
Talalaev 11'; Tishkov 61'; Murashov 77'	Report	Zamorano 9'; Hierro 56'

Eduard Streltsov Stadium, Moscow
Attendance: 6,500
Referee: Jaap Uilenberg (Netherlands)

Real Madrid won 7–5 on aggregate.

4 November 1992
17:00

Vác (Hungary)	0–1	(Portugal) Benfica
	Report	Schwarz 14'

Vác Városi Stadion, Vác
Attendance: 3,000
Referee: Oğuz Sarvan (Turkey)

Benfica won 6–1 on aggregate.

4 November 1992
18:00

Dynamo Kyiv (Ukraine)	0–3	(Belgium) Anderlecht
	Report	van Vossen 20'; Nilis 61', 67'

Republican Stadium, Kyiv
Attendance: 24,000
Referee: Rune Pedersen (Norway)

Anderlecht won 7–2 on aggregate.

4 November 1992
19:15

Grasshopper (Switzerland)	4–3	(Italy) Roma
de Vicente 36' (pen.), 68'; Sutter 49'; Gämperle 58'	Report	Rizzitelli 7', 90'; Caniggia 30'

Hardturm, Zürich
Attendance: 15,100
Referee: Frans Van Den Wijngaert (Belgium)

Roma won 6–4 on aggregate.

4 November 1992
20:00

Standard Liège (Belgium)	1–0	(Scotland) Heart of Midlothian
Wilmots 62'	Report

Stade Maurice Dufrasne, Liège
Attendance: 15,502
Referee: Philippe Leduc (France)

Standard Liège won 2–0 on aggregate.

4 November 1992
20:00

Ajax (Netherlands)	2–1	(Portugal) Vitória de Guimarães
Bergkamp 25'; Alflen 60'	Report	N'Dinga 57'

Olympisch Stadion, Amsterdam
Attendance: 22,000
Referee: Ilkka Koho (Finland)

Ajax won 5–1 on aggregate.

4 November 1992
20:15

Sheffield Wednesday (England)	2–2	(Germany) Kaiserslautern
Wilson 27'; Sheridan 65'	Report	Witeczek 62'; Zeyer 76'

Hillsborough Stadium, Sheffield
Attendance: 27,597
Referee: Sándor Puhl (Hungary)

Kaiserslautern won 5–3 on aggregate.

4 November 1992
20:15

Juventus (Italy)	0–0	(Greece) Panathinaikos
	Report

Stadio delle Alpi, Turin
Attendance: 21,592
Referee: Mario van der Ende (Netherlands)

Juventus won 1–0 on aggregate.

4 November 1992
21:00

Paris Saint-Germain (France)	0–0	(Italy) Napoli
	Report

Parc des Princes, Paris
Attendance: 43,605
Referee: Joe Worrall (England)

Paris Saint-Germain won 2–0 on aggregate.

5 November 1992
18:00

Dynamo Moscow (Russia)	0–0	(Italy) Torino
	Report

Central Dynamo Stadium, Moscow
Attendance: 13,000
Referee: Jozef Marko (Czechoslovakia)

Dynamo Moscow won 2–1 on aggregate.

== Third round ==
Team 1	Agg.	Team 2	1st leg	2nd leg
Roma (Italy)	5–4	(Turkey) Galatasaray	3–1	2–3
Ajax (Netherlands)	3–0	(Germany) Kaiserslautern	2–0	1–0
Borussia Dortmund (Germany)	4–3	(Spain) Zaragoza	3–1	1–2
Dynamo Moscow (Russia)	2–4	(Portugal) Benfica	2–2	0–2
Paris Saint-Germain (France)	1–1 (a)	(Belgium) Anderlecht	0–0	1–1
Sigma Olomouc (Czechoslovakia)	1–7	(Italy) Juventus	1–2	0–5
Standard Liège (Belgium)	3–4	(France) Auxerre	2–2	1–2
Vitesse (Netherlands)	0–2	(Spain) Real Madrid	0–1	0–1

=== First leg ===
24 November 1992
18:30

Ajax (Netherlands)	2–0	(Germany) Kaiserslautern
Davids 1'; Jonk 83'	Report

Olympisch Stadion, Amsterdam
Attendance: 39,000
Referee: Howard King (Wales)

24 November 1992
19:00

Standard Liège (Belgium)	2–2	(France) Auxerre
Goossens 9', 48'	Report	Verlaat 55'; Baticle 71'

Stade Maurice Dufrasne, Liège
Attendance: 16,600
Referee: Jim McCluskey (Scotland)

24 November 1992
20:15

Borussia Dortmund (Germany)	3–1	(Spain) Zaragoza
Chapuisat 13'; Zorc 23' (pen.); Povlsen 42'	Report	Franco 51'

Westfalenstadion, Dortmund
Attendance: 35,917
Referee: David Elleray (England)

24 November 1992
20:45

Paris Saint-Germain (France)	0–0	(Belgium) Anderlecht
	Report

Parc des Princes, Paris
Attendance: 32,402
Referee: Angelo Amendolia (Italy)

25 November 1992
13:30

Sigma Olomouc (Czechoslovakia)	1–2	(Italy) Juventus
Maroši 89'	Report	Möller 23'; D. Baggio 76'

Andrův stadion, Olomouc
Attendance: 13,473
Referee: Joaquín Urío Velázquez (Spain)

25 November 1992
18:00

Dynamo Moscow (Russia)	2–2	(Portugal) Benfica
Kalitvintsev 75'; Derkach 88'	Report	Isaías 36', 54'

Central Dynamo Stadium, Moscow
Attendance: 8,700
Referee: John Blankenstein (Netherlands)

25 November 1992
18:45

Roma (Italy)	3–1	(Turkey) Galatasaray
Aldair 59', 90'; Muzzi 80'	Report	Şükür 85'

Stadio Olimpico, Rome
Attendance: 23,980
Referee: Bernd Heynemann (Germany)

26 November 1992
19:30

Vitesse (Netherlands)	0–1	(Spain) Real Madrid
	Report	Hierro 73'

Nieuw Monnikenhuize, Arnhem
Attendance: 12,074
Referee: Kaj Natri (Finland)

=== Second leg ===
8 December 1992
17:00

Benfica (Portugal)	2–0	(Russia) Dynamo Moscow
Isaías 52'; Yuran 57'	Report

Estádio da Luz, Lisbon
Attendance: 50,000
Referee: Gheorghe Constantin (Romania)

Benfica won 4–2 on aggregate.

8 December 1992
20:00

Zaragoza (Spain)	2–1	(Germany) Borussia Dortmund
Poyet 27'; Brehme 90' (pen.)	Report	Chapuisat 62'

La Romareda, Zaragoza
Attendance: 39,000
Referee: Hubert Forstinger (Austria)

Borussia Dortmund won 4–3 on aggregate.

8 December 1992
20:00

Anderlecht (Belgium)	1–1	(France) Paris Saint-Germain
Bosman 53'	Report	Kombouaré 76'

Stade Constant Vanden Stock, Brussels
Attendance: 21,000
Referee: Kurt Röthlisberger (Switzerland)

1–1 on aggregate. Paris Saint-Germain won on away goals.

8 December 1992
20:15

Kaiserslautern (Germany)	0–1	(Netherlands) Ajax
	Report	Alflen 42'

Fritz-Walter-Stadion, Kaiserslautern
Attendance: 27,111
Referee: Jorge Coroado (Portugal)

Ajax won 3–0 on aggregate.

8 December 1992
20:45

Auxerre (France)	2–1	(Belgium) Standard Liège
Dutuel 71'; Baticle 81'	Report	Wilmots 88'

Stade de l'Abbé-Deschamps, Auxerre
Attendance: 18,083
Referee: Patrick Kelly (Republic of Ireland)

Auxerre won 4–3 on aggregate.

9 December 1992
11:55

Galatasaray (Turkey)	3–2	(Italy) Roma
Mustafa 27', 58'; Arif 75'	Report	Caniggia 7'; Häßler 47'

Ali Sami Yen Stadium, Istanbul
Attendance: 22,868
Referee: Peter Mikkelsen (Denmark)

Roma won 5–4 on aggregate.

10 December 1992
20:30

Juventus (Italy)	5–0	(Czechoslovakia) Sigma Olomouc
Vialli 6', 50'; Casiraghi 29'; Möller 46'; Ravanelli 70'	Report

Stadio delle Alpi, Turin
Attendance: 5,047
Referee: Joël Quiniou (France)

Juventus won 7–1 on aggregate.

10 December 1992
21:00

Real Madrid (Spain)	1–0	(Netherlands) Vitesse
Zamorano 31'	Report

Estadio Santiago Bernabéu, Madrid
Attendance: 18,000
Referee: Leslie Mottram (Scotland)

Real Madrid won 2–0 on aggregate.

== Quarter-finals ==
Team 1	Agg.	Team 2	1st leg	2nd leg
Roma (Italy)	1–2	(Germany) Borussia Dortmund	1–0	0–2
Auxerre (France)	4–3	(Netherlands) Ajax	4–2	0–1
Real Madrid (Spain)	4–5	(France) Paris Saint-Germain	3–1	1–4
Benfica (Portugal)	2–4	(Italy) Juventus	2–1	0–3

=== First leg ===
2 March 1993
20:30

Roma (Italy)	1–0	(Germany) Borussia Dortmund
Mihajlović 66'	Report

Stadio Olimpico, Rome
Attendance: 41,351
Referee: Mario van der Ende (Netherlands)

2 March 1993
21:15

Real Madrid (Spain)	3–1	(France) Paris Saint-Germain
Butragueño 31'; Zamorano 34'; Míchel 90'	Report	Ginola 49'

Estadio Santiago Bernabéu, Madrid
Attendance: 42,000
Referee: David Elleray (England)

3 March 1993
18:15

Auxerre (France)	4–2	(Netherlands) Ajax
Verlaat 16'; Martins 43'; Vahirua 81'; Dutuel 90'	Report	Pettersson 3'; Vink 45'

Stade de l'Abbé-Deschamps, Auxerre
Attendance: 17,952
Referee: Arcangelo Pezzella (Italy)

4 March 1993
21:30

Benfica (Portugal)	2–1	(Italy) Juventus
Paneira 11', 80'	Report	Vialli 59' (pen.)

Estádio da Luz, Lisbon
Attendance: 35,000
Referee: Guy Goethals (Belgium)

=== Second leg ===
16 March 1993
20:00

Ajax (Netherlands)	1–0	(France) Auxerre
F. de Boer 60'	Report

Olympisch Stadion, Amsterdam
Attendance: 43,000
Referee: Kurt Röthlisberger (Switzerland)

Auxerre won 4–3 on aggregate.

17 March 1993
17:45

Juventus (Italy)	3–0	(Portugal) Benfica
Kohler 2'; D. Baggio 43'; Ravanelli 67'	Report

Stadio delle Alpi, Turin
Attendance: 51,697
Referee: Peter Mikkelsen (Denmark)

Juventus won 4–2 on aggregate.

18 March 1993
20:00

Paris Saint-Germain (France)	4–1	(Spain) Real Madrid
Weah 33'; Ginola 81'; Valdo 87'; Kombouaré 90+4'	Report	Zamorano 90+3'

Parc des Princes, Paris
Attendance: 45,084
Referee: Sándor Puhl (Hungary)

Paris Saint-Germain won 5–4 on aggregate.

18 March 1993
20:15

Borussia Dortmund (Germany)	2–0	(Italy) Roma
Schulz 41'; Sippel 46'	Report

Westfalenstadion, Dortmund
Attendance: 35,800
Referee: Václav Krondl (Czech Republic)

Borussia Dortmund won 2–1 on aggregate.

== Semi-finals ==
Team 1	Agg.	Team 2	1st leg	2nd leg
Borussia Dortmund (Germany)	2–2 (6–5 p)	(France) Auxerre	2–0	0–2 (a.e.t.)
Juventus (Italy)	3–1	(France) Paris Saint-Germain	2–1	1–0

=== First leg ===
6 April 1993
20:15

Borussia Dortmund (Germany)	2–0	(France) Auxerre
Karl 59'; Zorc 87'	Report

Westfalenstadion, Dortmund
Attendance: 35,800
Referee: Frans Van Den Wijngaert (Belgium)

6 April 1993
20:40

Juventus (Italy)	2–1	(France) Paris Saint-Germain
R. Baggio 54', 90'	Report	Weah 23'

Stadio delle Alpi, Turin
Attendance: 42,793
Referee: Antonio Martín Navarrete (Spain)

=== Second leg ===
20 April 1993
20:45

Auxerre (France)	2–0 (a.e.t.)	(Germany) Borussia Dortmund
Martins 8'; Verlaat 72'	Report
Penalties
Vahirua (penalty scored); Prunier (penalty scored); Laslandes (penalty scored); Verlaat (penalty scored); Dutuel (penalty scored); Mahé (penalty missed)	5–6	(penalty scored) Karl; (penalty scored) Chapuisat; (penalty scored) Reinhardt; (penalty scored) Schulz; (penalty scored) Zorc; (penalty scored) Rummenigge

Stade de l'Abbé-Deschamps, Auxerre
Attendance: 18,310
Referee: Serge Muhmenthaler (Switzerland)

2–2 on aggregate. Borussia Dortmund won 6–5 on penalties.

22 April 1993
20:15

Paris Saint-Germain (France)	0–1	(Italy) Juventus
	Report	R. Baggio 77'

Parc des Princes, Paris
Attendance: 46,152
Referee: Jaap Uilenberg (Netherlands)

Juventus won 3–1 on aggregate.

== Final ==
=== First leg ===
5 May 1993
20:15

Borussia Dortmund (Germany)	1–3	(Italy) Juventus
Rummenigge 2'	Report	D. Baggio 27'; R. Baggio 30', 74'

Westfalenstadion, Dortmund
Attendance: 37,900
Referee: Sándor Puhl (Hungary)

=== Second leg ===
19 May 1993
20:30

Juventus (Italy)	3–0	(Germany) Borussia Dortmund
D. Baggio 5', 43'; Möller 65'	Report

Stadio delle Alpi, Turin
Attendance: 62,781
Referee: John Blankenstein (Netherlands)

Juventus won 6–1 on aggregate.

== Top scorers ==
The top scorers from the 1992–93 UEFA Cup are as follows:

Rank	Name	Team	Goals
1	(France) Gérald Baticle	(France) Auxerre	8
2	(Liberia) George Weah	(France) Paris Saint-Germain	7
3	(Italy) Roberto Baggio	(Italy) Juventus	6
3	(Uruguay) Daniel Fonseca	(Italy) Napoli	6
3	(Germany) Marcel Witeczek	(Germany) Kaiserslautern	6
6	(Italy) Dino Baggio	(Italy) Juventus	5
6	(Spain) Fernando Hierro	(Spain) Real Madrid	5
6	(Brazil) Isaías	(Portugal) Benfica	5
6	(Italy) Gianluca Vialli	(Italy) Juventus	5
6	(Ghana) Tony Yeboah	(Germany) Eintracht Frankfurt	5
6	(Chile) Iván Zamorano	(Spain) Real Madrid	5

== See also ==
- 1992–93 UEFA Champions League
- 1992-93 UEFA Cup Winners' Cup
