= Marosi =

Marosi or Maroši is a surname. Notable people with the surname include:

- Ádám Marosi (born 1984), Hungarian modern pentathlete
- Attila Marosi (born 1982), Hungarian alpine skier
- István Marosi (1944–2018), Hungarian handball player
- Jan Maroši (born 1965), Czech footballer
- József Marosi (1934–2026), Hungarian fencer
- Katalin Marosi (born 1979), Hungarian tennis player
- László Marosi (born 1962), Hungarian handball player
- Marko Maroši (born 1993), Slovak footballer
- Martin Maroši (born 1988), Slovak footballer
- Paula Marosi (1936–2022), Hungarian fencer
