= 1991–92 Danish Superliga =

2nd season of Danish Superliga

Danish Superliga
- Season: 1991-92
- Champions: Lyngby BK
- Relegated: Vejle BK

The 1991–92 Danish Superliga season was the 2nd season of the Danish Superliga league championship, governed by the Danish Football Association.

The tournament was held in two rounds. First round was in the autumn 1991, and the second in the spring 1992. The teams placed first to eighth in first round, played in second round. Their goal scores were reset to zero, and their mutual points were shorted to the half.

The two teams placed ninth and tenth in first round, played in the qualification league in the spring. They had respectively 8 and 7 points with.

The Danish champions qualified for the UEFA Champions League 1992-93 qualification, while the second and third placed teams qualified for the qualification round of the UEFA Cup 1992-93. The teams placed first and second in the qualification league promoted.

== Autumn 1991 ==
=== Table ===
Pos	Team	Pld	W	D	L	GF	GA	GD	Pts	Qualification or relegation
1	Brøndby	18	8	8	2	30	18	+12	24	Qualification to Spring 1992 competition
2	Lyngby Boldklub	18	8	7	3	32	18	+14	23	Qualification to Spring 1992 competition
3	B 1903	18	8	5	5	32	26	+6	21	Qualification to Spring 1992 competition
4	AaB	18	6	7	5	30	18	+12	19	Qualification to Spring 1992 competition
5	AGF	18	6	7	5	19	19	0	19	Qualification to Spring 1992 competition
6	Frem	18	5	7	6	25	27	−2	17	Qualification to Spring 1992 competition
7	Næstved IF	18	6	4	8	33	34	−1	16	Qualification to Spring 1992 competition
8	Silkeborg IF	18	6	4	8	24	30	−6	16	Qualification to Spring 1992 competition
9	Vejle BK	18	6	2	10	24	30	−6	14	Qualification to Qualification League
10	OB	18	4	3	11	28	49	−21	11	Qualification to Qualification League

Source: danskfodbold.com
Rules for classification: 1) points; 2) goal difference; 3) number of goals scored.

=== Results ===
Home \ Away	AGF	B03	BKF	BIF	LBK	NIF	OB	SIF	VBK	AAB
AGF		4–1	2–0	1–1	0–3	3–0	1–1	0–3	3–2	0–0
B 1903	3–1		2–1	1–1	2–2	0–0	3–2	4–0	1–0	0–1
BK Frem	3–1	1–3		1–1	1–1	2–2	2–1	2–2	1–0	0–0
Brøndby IF	0–1	2–2	1–1		1–0	3–1	2–0	3–1	0–1	1–1
Lyngby BK	0–0	1–1	2–1	0–2		0–2	3–1	4–2	3–1	1–1
Næstved IF	2–0	1–3	2–0	3–3	0–2		3–6	0–1	3–1	2–2
OB	0–0	3–2	2–5	0–2	1–5	0–6		0–4	2–1	1–3
Silkeborg IF	0–0	1–0	1–1	1–1	0–3	1–3	1–3		1–2	2–1
Vejle BK	0–0	4–2	1–2	1–3	1–1	5–2	2–1	1–0		1–2
AaB	0–2	1–2	3–1	2–3	1–1	2–1	4–4	2–3	3–0	

== Spring 1992 ==
=== Table ===
Pos	Team	Pld	W	D	L	GF	GA	GD	Pts	Qualification or relegation
1	Lyngby Boldklub (C)	14	9	2	3	22	7	+15	32	Qualification to Champions League first round
2	B 1903	14	8	2	4	32	26	+6	29	Qualification to UEFA Cup first round
3	Frem	14	6	5	3	20	12	+8	26	Qualification to UEFA Cup first round
4	AGF (Note: AGF qualified for the Cup Winners' Cup via the 1991–92 Danish Cup)	14	5	3	6	18	15	+3	23	Qualification to Cup Winners' Cup first round
5	AaB	14	4	5	5	16	19	−3	23	
6	Silkeborg IF	14	5	4	5	13	20	−7	22	
7	Brøndby	14	4	2	8	16	24	−8	22	
8	Næstved IF	14	2	3	9	33	34	−1	15	

Source: danskfodbold.com
Rules for classification: 1) points; 2) goal difference; 3) number of goals scored.
(C) Champions

=== Results ===
Home \ Away	AGF	B03	BKF	BIF	LBK	NIF	SIF	AAB
AGF		1–0	0–0	3–0	1–1	6–1	0–1	1–0
B 1903	1–0		0–0	1–0	0–1	3–1	3–0	6–0
BK Frem	3–3	2–0		3–1	0–1	2–1	3–0	0–1
Brøndby IF	2–0	1–3	0–0		1–2	3–1	2–3	4–2
Lyngby BK	0–1	3–0	1–2	1–0		4–0	3–0	1–0
Næstved IF	1–0	0–2	2–2	0–1	0–4		3–0	1–1
Silkeborg IF	3–1	1–3	1–0	1–1	2–0	1–1		0–0
AaB	2–1	1–1	1–3	4–0	0–0	4–1	0–0	

== Top goalscorers ==
Rank	Player	Club	Goals
1	(Denmark) Peter Møller	AaB	17
2	(Denmark) Lars Elstrup	OB	12
2	(Denmark) Michael Manniche	B 1903	12
4	(Denmark) Søren Andersen	AGF	11
5	(Denmark) Per Pedersen	Lyngby Boldklub	10
5	(Denmark) Steen Thychosen	Vejle BK	10
5	(Denmark) Alex Nielsen	Næstved IF	10
5	(Denmark) Heine Fernandez	Silkeborg IF	10
5	(Denmark) Søren Juel	Næstved IF	10
10	(Denmark) Kim Vilfort	Brøndby IF	9
10	(Denmark) Peter Nielsen	Lyngby Boldklub	9
10	(Denmark) Torben Frank	Lyngby Boldklub	9

== See also ==
- 1991–92 in Danish football
