= Pascal Vahirua =

French retired footballer (born 1966)

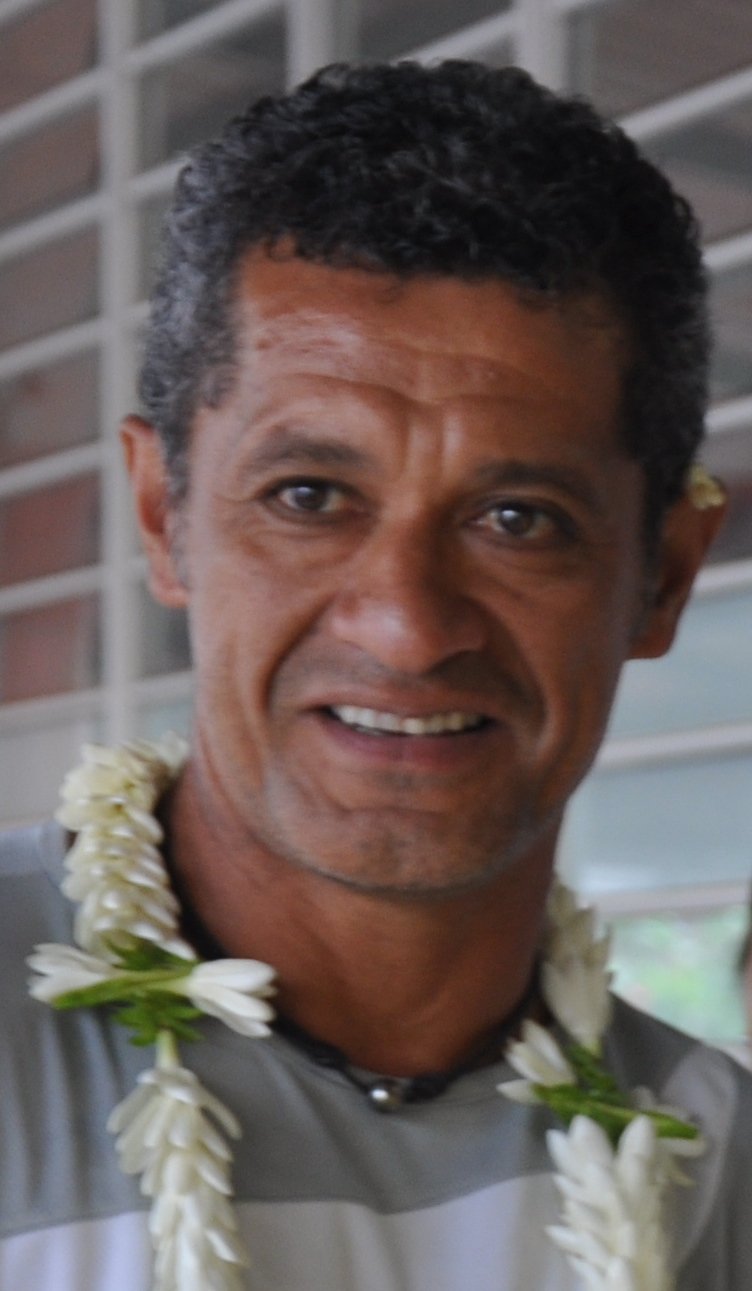

Personal information
- Date of birth: 9 March 1966 (age 60)
- Place of birth: Papeete, Tahiti, French Polynesia, France
- Height: 1.75 m (5 ft 9 in)
- Position: Winger

Youth career
- Mateiea
- Vataka
- 1982–1985: Auxerre

Senior career*
Years	Team	Apps	(Gls)
1985–1995	Auxerre	287	(53)
1995–1998	Caen	74	(4)
1998–2001	Atromitos		
2001–2002	Tours	11	(1)
2002–2005	Stade Auxerrois		
2005	Auxerre II		

International career
1990–1994	France	22	(1)
- * Club domestic league appearances and goals

Pascal Vahirua (born 9 March 1966) is a French former professional footballer who played as a winger. His career was intimately connected with AJ Auxerre. Vahirua appeared for the France national team at Euro 1992.

== Club career ==
Vahirua was born in Papeete, Tahiti, French Polynesia. Discovered by legendary club manager Guy Roux, who was vacationing in the island, he moved to AJ Auxerre's youth academy in 1982, aged 16, going on to amass nearly 400 official appearances for the club in nine full professional seasons and making his Ligue 1 debut on 25 September 1984 in a 3–1 home win against Stade Brestois 29.

During the 90s, speedy Vahirua was part of a solid team whose attacking unit also included Gérald Baticle, Christophe Cocard and Corentin Martins. They reached the semi-finals of the 1992–93 UEFA Cup, losing on penalties to Borussia Dortmund. He left the team in 1995 – precisely the year they would go on to achieve a historic double – with only the 1994 edition of the French Cup to his credit.

In the following seven seasons, Vahirua represented Stade Malherbe Caen, Atromitos F.C. in Greece and Tours FC, retiring professionally in 2002. He played amateur football for three more years in the city of Auxerre, with neighbours Stade Auxerrois and AJ's reserves, after which he took charge of football development in the area, which included the club's youth sides.

== International career ==
Vahirua earned his first cap for France on 21 January 1990, in a friendly home with Kuwait (1–0), and scored his only goal in another exhibition game, against Belgium in preparation for the UEFA Euro 1992 (3–3), on 25 March.

Summoned for the final stages by Michel Platini, the coach who also gave him his debut, Vahirua played twice in an eventual group stage exit, and was also part of the nation's infamous 1994 FIFA World Cup qualification campaign, in which they lost their last two home matches. With a total of 22 internationals, he was the first ever Polynesian to don the French shirt.

== Personal life ==
Vahirua is cousin to another footballer and winger, Marama Vahirua. He was brought up in another famed academy in France, FC Nantes.

== Career statistics ==
=== International ===
Appearances and goals by national team and year
National team	Year	Apps	Goals
France	1990	6	0
France	1991	4	0
France	1992	9	1
France	1993	2	0
France	1994	1	0
Total		22	1

List of international goals scored by Pascal Vahirua
No.	Date	Venue	Cap	Opponent	Score	Result	Competition	Ref.
1	25 March 1992	Parc des Princes, Paris, France	11	Belgium	2–2	3–3	Friendly	

== Honours ==
Auxerre

- Coupe de France: 1993–94
- Coupe Gambardella: 1985
- Championnat National: 1985–86
