= 1994–95 Danish Cup =

Tournament details
- Country: Denmark

Final positions
- Champions: F.C. Copenhagen
- Runners-up: AB

The 1994–95 Danish Cup was the 41st season of the Danish Cup, the highest football competition in Denmark. The final was played on 25 May 1995.

== First round ==
Team 1	Score	Team 2
AB 70	2–5	Nykøbing FA
Albertslund IF	2–0	IK Viking Rønne
Ballerup IF	2–4	Møns FK
Fjordager IF	3–4 (a.e.t.)	Sædding/Guldager IF
Fjordbakken IF	0–3	IF Hasle Fuglebakken
Frederikshavn fI	3–4	Aarhus Fremad
Hjørring AIK Frem	1–0	Hadsund BK
Faaborg B&I	2–2 (a.e.t.) (5–3 p)	Otterup B&IK
Greve IF	6–1	Stubbekøbing BK
Hammerum IF	3–2	B 1909
Holbæk B&I	4–2	Dragør BK
Humlebæk BK	7–3	Skælskør B&I
Kolding BK	2–3	Dalum IF
Kolding IF	6–1	Hobro IK
Korup IF	1–3	BK Prespa
Nykøbing Mors IF	0–6	Bramming BK
Rikken FC	2–1	Horslunde BK
Roskilde BK	5–0	Sundby BK
Skovshoved IF	4–6	Ryvang FC
IF Skjold Skævinge	2–5	Søllerød BK
AIK 65 Strøby	0–6	Vordingborg IF
Tjørring IF	3–3 (a.e.t.) (4–3 p)	TST 79 Aarhus
Vejen SF	2–0	Asaa BK
Vildbjerg SF	3–0	Krogsbølle-Roerslev FK

== Second round ==
Team 1	Score	Team 2
Albertslund IF	2–4	Helsingør IF
BK Avarta	0–3	Hellerup IK
IF Skjold Birkerød	13–2	Rikken FC
Bramming BK	1–4	Nørre Aaby IK
Hammerum IF	1–3	Vejen SF
Holbæk B&I	4–3 (a.e.t.)	FC Fredericia
Kastrup BK	0–2	Harlev IK
Kolding IF	1–2	Aalborg Chang
Køge BK	7–4	Nykøbing FA
Møns FK	1–6	Greve IF
BK Prespa	6–5	Humlebæk BK
Randers Freja	1–3	Dalum IF
Roskilde BK	1–0	Ryvang FC
Svendborg fB	4–0	Haderslev FK
Sædding/Guldager IF	5–1	Faaborg B&I
Søllerød BK	5–8	Vordingborg IF
Tjørring IF	2–3	Aarhus Fremad
Vanløse IF	3–2	Glostrup IF 32
Varde IF	1–0	IF Hasle Fuglebakken
Vildbjerg SF	2–0	Hjørring AIK Frem

== Third round ==
Team 1	Score	Team 2
B.93	4–2	Ølstykke FC
IF Skjold Birkerød	2–1 (a.e.t.)	Herlev IF
Helsingør IF	1–0	Brønshøj BK
Herning Fremad	4–0	AC Horsens
Hellerup IK	4–6	Holbæk B&I
Holstebro BK	1–1 (a.e.t.) (7–8 p)	Nørresundby BK
Hvidovre IF	4–2	Greve IF
Køge BK	0–0 (a.e.t.) (3–4 p)	Roskilde BK
BK Prespa	2–1	Vanløse IF
Svendborg fB	4–2	B 1913
Sædding/Guldager IF	1–2	Aarhus Fremad
Varde IF	0–1	Vejen SF
Vejle BK	0–6	Esbjerg fB
Vildbjerg SF	1–3	Dalum IF
Vordingborg IF	2–4	AB
Aalborg Chang	3–1	Nørre Aaby IK

== Fourth round ==
Team 1	Score	Team 2
AB	5–3 (a.e.t.)	Hvidovre IF
IF Skjold Birkerød	4–3	Næstved IF
Esbjerg fB	4–1	Holbæk B&I
Fremad Amager	5–1	Vejen SF
Herfølge BK	4–2	Ikast FS
Lyngby BK	3–3 (a.e.t.) (5–3 p)	AGF
Nørresundby BK	0–5	AaB
BK Prespa	4–4 (a.e.t.) (4–2 p)	Dalum IF
Svendborg fB	2–3	Helsingør IF
Viborg FF	2–1	Herning Fremad
Aalborg Chang	1–0 (a.e.t.)	B.93
Roskilde BK	1–5	Roskilde BK

== Fifth round ==
Team 1	Score	Team 2
AB	3–1	Roskilde BK
IF Skjold Birkerød	3–0	Aalborg Chang
Brøndby IF	5–4	Viborg FF
Esbjerg fB	0–1 (a.e.t.)	Lyngby BK
F.C. Copenhagen	2–1	Fremad Amager
Helsingør IF	0–5	AaB
BK Prespa	0–5	Odense BK
Silkeborg IF	2–5	Herfølge BK

== Quarter-finals ==
Team 1	Score	Team 2
AB	1–0	Brøndby IF
Herfølge BK	2–4	F.C. Copenhagen
Lyngby BK	2–4	AaB
Odense BK	2–1	IF Skjold Birkerød

== Semi-finals ==
Team 1	Agg.	Team 2	1st leg	2nd leg
AB	1–1 (a)	Odense BK	0–0	1–1
F.C. Copenhagen	2–0	AaB	2–0	0–0

== Final ==
25 May 1995

AB	0–5	F.C. Copenhagen
	Report	Lønstrup 12'; Nielsen 67', 81'; Uldbjerg 70'; Johansen 90'

Parken Stadium, Copenhagen
Attendance: 20,536
Referee: Knud Erik Fisker
