= Roberto Straal =

Dutch footballer

Personal information
- Date of birth: 19 December 1966
- Place of birth: Arnhem, Netherlands
- Height: 1.88 m (6 ft 2 in)
- Position: Defender

Senior career*
Years	Team	Apps	(Gls)
1986–1987	De Graafschap		
1987–1994	Vitesse		
1994–1995	MVV Maastricht	26	(2)
1995–1998	SC Heerenveen	59	(7)
1998–2001	Arminia Bielefeld	26	(0)
2001–2004	BSV Schwarz-Weiß Rehden		
- * Club domestic league appearances and goals

Roberto Straal (born 19 December 1966) is a Dutch former professional footballer who played as a defender. He played for Eerste Divisie and Eredivisie clubs De Graafschap, Vitesse, MVV Maastricht and SC Heerenveen and for German clubs Arminia Bielefeld and BSV Schwarz-Weiß Rehden.
