= Kim Mikkelsen =

Danish footballer (born 1965)

Personal information
- Date of birth: 24 November 1965 (age 60)
- Place of birth: Frederiksberg
- Position: Midfielder

Senior career*
Years	Team	Apps	(Gls)
1984–1986	BK Frem		
1987	Herfølge BK		
1987–1990	FC Roskilde		
1991–1992	BK Frem		
1993–1994	FC København		
1995–1996	Herfølge BK		
1996–1998	BK Frem		

International career
- Denmark u-21
- * Club domestic league appearances and goals

Kim Mikkelsen (born 24 November 1965) is a Danish retired football midfielder.
