= Jesmond Delia =

Maltese footballer

Personal information
- Full name: Jesmond Delia
- Date of birth: 20 March 1967 (age 59)
- Place of birth: Cospicua, Malta
- Position: Defender

Youth career
- St. George's

Senior career*
Years	Team	Apps	(Gls)
1983–1988	St. George's	17	(0)
1989–1995	Floriana	104	(2)
1996–1998	Hibernians	53	(1)
1998–2003	Pietà Hotspurs	75	(5)
2001-2002	→ Marsaxlokk (loan)	12	(0)
2002–2003	→ Msida Saint-Joseph (loan)	18	(0)
2003–2004	Floriana	20	(0)
2004–2006	St. George's	33	(6)
2006–2007	Mqabba	13	(0)
2007–2008	St. George's	16	(1)
2008–2010	Pietà Hotspurs	21	(1)
Total		382	(16)

International career^{‡}
1989–1995	Malta	11	(0)
- * Club domestic league appearances and goals as of 17 January 2010 ‡ National team caps and goals as of 17 January 2010

Jesmond Delia (born 20 March 1967 in Malta) is a retired footballer who last played for Maltese First Division side Pietà Hotspurs, where he played as a defender. He was voted Malta Footballer of the Month in November 1999.

== Club career ==
He has played a large part of his career during different spells for hometown club St. George's. After a one-year loan spell at Msida Saint-Joseph, Delia rejoined Floriana from Pietà Hotspurs in summer 2003. He had earlier been loaned to Marsaxlokk.

== International career ==
Delia made his debut for Malta in an April 1989 World Cup qualification match against Northern Ireland and earned a total of 11 caps, scoring no goals. His final international was a September 1995 European Championship qualification match away against Luxembourg.

== Personal life ==
Delia's son Jamie joined Mqabba from Attard in summer 2022.

== Honours ==
Floriana

- Maltese Premier League: 1

1993

- FA Trophy: 2

1993, 1994

Hibernians

- FA Trophy: 1

1998
