= Iørn Uldbjerg =

Danish footballer (born 1968)

Personal information
- Full name: Iørn Peter Uldbjerg
- Date of birth: February 1, 1968 (age 58)
- Place of birth: ?, Denmark
- Position: Midfielder

Youth career
- Tårnby BK

Senior career*
Years	Team	Apps	(Gls)
1976–1988	Tårnby BK		
1988–1992	B 1903		
1992–1998	FC Copenhagen	131	(14)
1998–2000	Herfølge BK	32	(0)
2000–2001	Farum BK		

International career
1988	Denmark u-21	6	(0)

Managerial career
- 2007–2009: FA 2000
- 2009: Allerød FK (caretaker)
- 2010-XXXX: KB (reserves)
- 2012–2018: FB
- * Club domestic league appearances and goals

Iørn Peter Uldbjerg (born February 1, 1968) is a Danish retired football (soccer) player, who most prominently won the 1993 Danish football championship with FC København. He began his senior career at Tårnby Boldklub and played six games for the Denmark national under-21 football team in 1988, before signing a professional contract with B 1903. He started playing for FC København when the club was founded in 1992, and after leaving the club in 1998, he ended his career at Herfølge BK and Farum BK.

Uldbjerg was part of the Herfølge squad that won the 1999–2000 Danish Superliga.

== Honours ==
FC Copenhagen

- Danish Cup: 1994–95, 1996–97

Herfølge

Danish Superliga: 1999–2000
