= Alex Nielsen =

Danish footballer (born 1958)

Personal information
- Full name: Alex Nielsen
- Date of birth: 26 March 1958 (age 68)
- Place of birth: Denmark
- Position: Goalkeeper

Youth career
- Boldklubben Sylvia

Senior career*
Years	Team	Apps	(Gls)
- Fremad Amager
	Vejle Boldklub	327	(0)
- Hvidovre IF

International career
	Denmark U21	16	
	Denmark	1	
- * Club domestic league appearances and goals

Alex Nielsen (born 26 March 1958) is a Danish former football goalkeeper.

== Biography ==
Nielsen is mainly known for his many years as goalkeeper at Vejle Boldklub. He came to VB in 1977 from Fremad Amager and became the first professional player at Vejle Boldklub.

Nielsen made his debut in 1978 against Medan and played his last game for VB in 1987 against the Czech Olympic team. During his time at the club Vejle won the Danish Cup in 1977 and 1981 and the Danish Championship in 1978 and 1984.
