= Pelle Blohm =

Swedish footballer (born 1967)

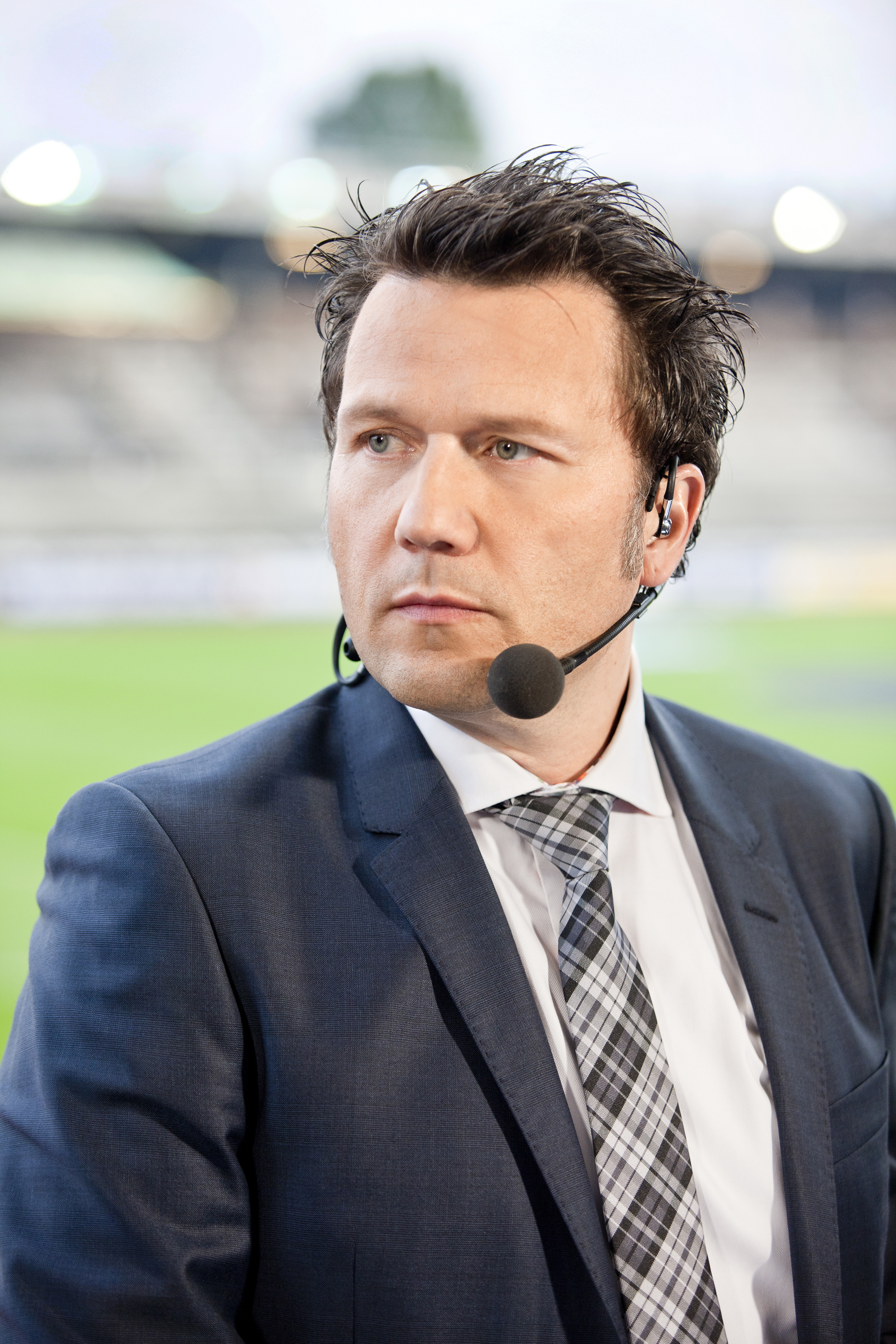

Personal information
- Full name: Per Arne Blohm
- Date of birth: 10 February 1967 (age 59)
- Place of birth: Örebro, Sweden
- Height: 1.78 m (5 ft 10 in)
- Position: Midfielder

Senior career*
Years	Team	Apps	(Gls)
1983–1988	BK Forward	125	(10)
1988–1992	Örebro SK	66	(6)
1992–1996	IFK Norrköping	84	(8)
1996–1997	Dalian Wanda	21	(1)
1997–1999	Viking FK	21	(3)
1999–2001	GAIS	34	(2)
Total		351	(30)

International career^{‡}
1982–1983	Sweden U17	17	(0)
1984	Sweden U19	8	(1)
1989	Sweden U21	1	(0)
1990	Sweden	1	(0)
- * Club domestic league appearances and goals as of 26 October 2017 (UTC) ‡ National team caps and goals as of 26 October (UTC)

Per Arne "Pelle" Blohm (born 10 February 1967) is a Swedish former professional footballer who played as a midfielder. During his club career, he played for BK Forward, Örebro SK, IFK Norrköping, Dalian Wanda, Viking FK and GAIS between 1983 and 2001. He made one appearance for the Sweden national team in 1990.

== Club career ==
Blohm became one of the first Westerners to play professionally in China when he signed with Dalian Wanda in 1996. He also represented BK Forward, Örebro SK, IFK Norrköping, Viking FK and GAIS during a career that spanned between 1983 and 2001.

== International career ==
Having represented the Sweden U17, U19, and U21 teams, Blohm made his only appearance for the Sweden national team on 10 October 1990 when he replaced Klas Ingesson in the 80th minute of a friendly 1–3 loss against Germany.

== Career statistics ==
=== International ===
Appearances and goals by national team and year
National team	Year	Apps	Goals
Sweden	1990	1	0
Total		1	0

== Honours ==
IFK Norrköping

- Svenska Cupen: 1993-94

Dalian Wanda

- Chinese Jia-A League: 1994
