= Lars Højer =

Danish footballer (born 1970)

Personal information
- Full name: Lars Højer Nielsen
- Date of birth: 8 December 1970 (age 55)
- Place of birth: Copenhagen, Denmark
- Position: Midfielder

Youth career
- 1976–1984: BK Heimdal
- 1984–1988: B 1903

Senior career*
Years	Team	Apps	(Gls)
1988–1992	B 1903		
1992–1999	Copenhagen	166	(54)
2000–2003	BK Skjold		

International career
1991–1992	Denmark U21	8	(0)
1993	Denmark	1	(0)

Managerial career
- 2000–2005: BK Skjold
- ?: BK Skjold (women)
- * Club domestic league appearances and goals

Lars Højer Nielsen (born 8 December 1970) is a Danish former professional footballer who played as a midfielder. He made 166 appearances for Copenhagen in the Danish Superliga from 1992 to 1999. His sons, Casper Højer and Oliver Højer, are also professional footballers.

Højer was known as a free kick specialist.

Previously he led BK Skjold's team from the fourth best Danish league to the second tier as a playing coach. He has also coached the club's women's team.

Højer is currently the head of scouting for Copenhagen.

== Honours ==
Copenhagen

- Danish Superliga: 1992–93
- Danish Cup : 1994–95, 1996–97
- Danish Super Cup: 1995

Individual

- Copenhagen Player of the Year: 1994
