= Martin Maroši =

Slovak footballer

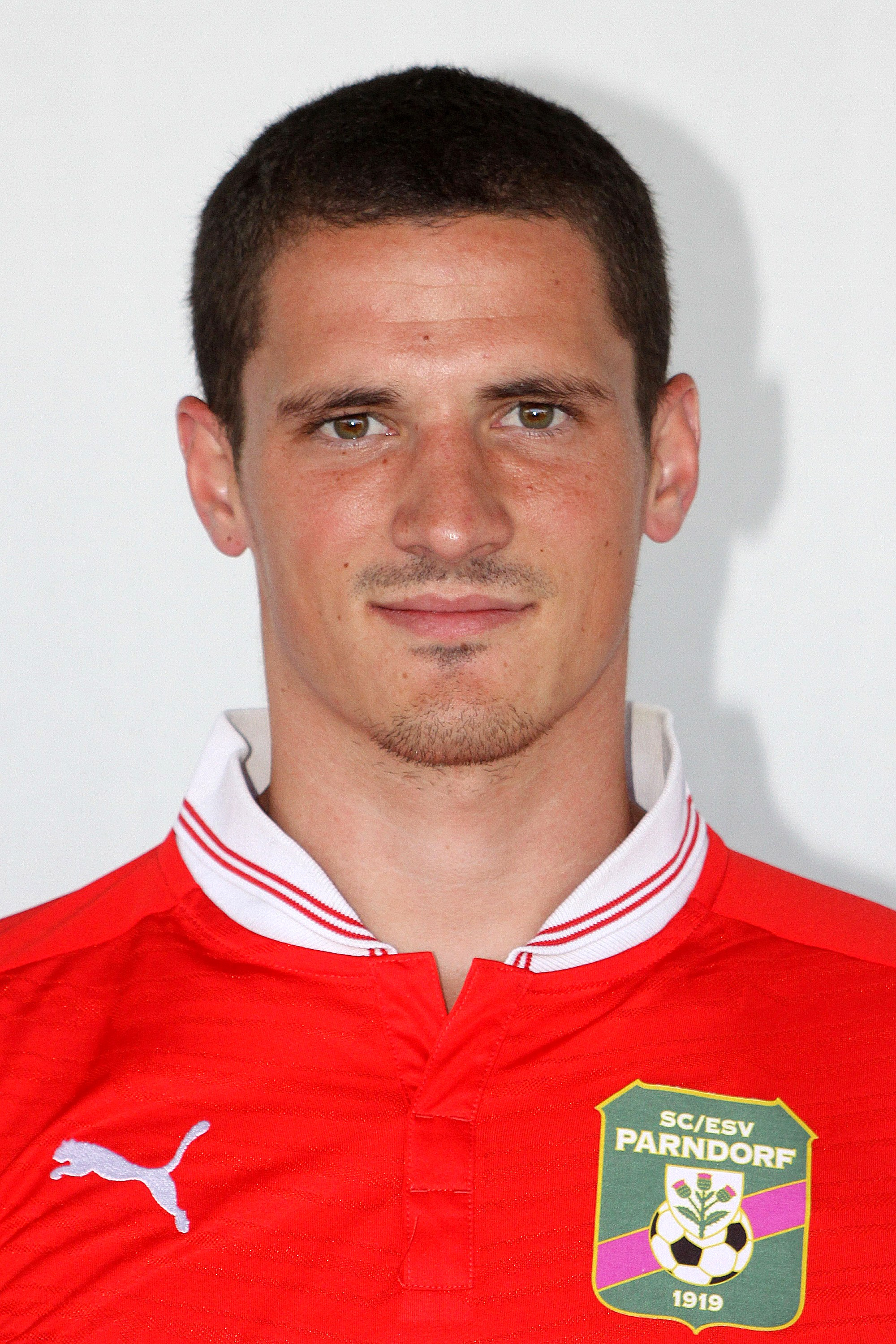

Personal information
- Full name: Martin Maroši
- Date of birth: 23 March 1988 (age 38)
- Place of birth: Bratislava, Slovakia, Czechoslovakia
- Height: 1.76 m (5 ft 9 in)
- Position: Midfielder

Youth career
- Inter Bratislava

Senior career*
| Years | Team | Apps | (Gls) |
| 2006–2009 | Artmedia Petržalka | 8 | (0) |
| 2010–2012 | Fotbal Třinec | 28 | (4) |
| 2011 | → Zbrojovka Brno (loan) | 0 | (0) |
| 2013–2016 | SC/ESV Parndorf 1919 | 28 | (9) |
- * Club domestic league appearances and goals as of 30 June 2016

Martin Maroši (born 23 March 1988 in Bratislava) is a Slovak footballer who currently plays for FK Fotbal Třinec in the Czech Republic as a midfielder.

He emerged from Inter Bratislava's youth set up and was signed up by Artmedia Petržalka as a promising young talent. He made his debut as a late substitute in a UEFA Cup away tie against Dinamo Minsk. After a difficult time trying to break into the first team he moved to Czech 2nd division side Fotbal Třinec in search of first team opportunities.

He spent half a year on loan at Czech First League outfit Zbrojovka Brno in the second half of the 2010–11 season, but failed to make a league appearance for the first team, playing just 45 minutes in a cup match against Kroměříž.

== Personal life ==
He is also the nephew of former Zbrojovka Brno and Sigma Olomouc player and icon Jan Maroši.
