= Jan Maroši =

Czech footballer

Personal information
- Date of birth: 4 November 1965 (age 60)
- Place of birth: Plzeň, Czechoslovakia
- Position: Midfielder

Youth career
- 1971–1977: TJ Sokol Medlánky
- 1977–1982: TJ KPS Brno

Senior career*
Years	Team	Apps	(Gls)
1983–1987	TJ KS Brno		
1987–1994	Sigma Olomouc	198	(52)
1994–2000	Brno	167	(15)
Total		366	(67)

International career
1991–1992	Czechoslovakia	2	(0)
- * Club domestic league appearances and goals

Jan Maroši (born 4 November 1965) is a Czech former football player. He made two international appearances for the Czechoslovakia national football team and is also known for having scored directly from a corner for Sigma Olomouc in a 1992–93 UEFA Cup match against Juventus. He made a total of 366 top flight appearances spanning the end of the Czechoslovak First League and the beginning of the Gambrinus liga, scoring 67 goals. In 2006 Maroši was ranked 15th on the list of players with most appearances in the Czech and/or Czechoslovak top flight since the Czechoslovak First League began in 1925.

== Club career ==
=== Sigma Olomouc ===
Maroši started out at Sigma Olomouc in 1987. Olomouc achieved third-place finishes in the Czechoslovak First League in 1990–91 and 1991–92 and subsequently qualified twice for the UEFA Europa League. In the 1991–92 UEFA Cup, Maroši scored in the second round match against Torpedo Moscow and Olomouc went on to reach the quarter-finals.

In the following season's 1992–93 UEFA Cup, Maroši again featured in Olomouc's European campaign, scoring the fourth goal in a 7–1 thrashing of Fenerbahçe in the second round. Although he scored a late goal directly from a corner against Juventus in the third round, it was to no avail as Juventus went on to win the tie comfortably, 7–1 on aggregate and subsequently went on to win the whole competition.

=== Brno ===
Maroši spent the second half of his career at Brno, joining in 1994. After Pavel Tobiáš became manager of Brno in the 2000–01 Gambrinus liga, Maroši was told he was surplus to requirements, signalling an end to his playing career at the top level.

== Post-playing career ==
Maroši went on to work as assistant coach to Roman Kotol at Dolní Kounice in the 2002–03 Czech 2. Liga.

After his career as a football player, Maroši became director of a sport school in Brno. In 2009, he became chairman of the City Football Association in Brno.

== Personal life ==
Maroši's nephew, Martin Maroši, is also a professional footballer.
