= 1995–96 Swiss Cup =

Tournament details
- Country: Switzerland
- Teams: 196

Final positions
- Champions: Sion
- Runners-up: Servette

Tournament statistics
- Matches played: 195

The 1995–96 Swiss Cup was the 71st season of Switzerland's football cup competition organised annually by the Swiss Football Association. The competition began on 9 August with the first games of Round 1 and ended on 19 May 1996 with the Final held at the former Wankdorf in Bern. The winners earned a place in the qualifying round of the Cup Winners' Cup.

== Overview ==
The competition began on 9 August and the week-end of 11–12 August 1995 with the games of the first round and ended on Sunday 19 May 1996 with the final held at the former Wankdorf Stadium in Bern. The 16 clubs from the Nationalliga B were granted byes for the first round. The 12 clubs from the Nationalliga A were granted byes for the first two rounds. The winners of the cup qualified themselves for the first round of the Cup Winners' Cup in the following season.

When possible, the draw respected regionalities and the lower classed team was granted home advantage. In the entire competition, the matches were played in a single knockout format. In the event of a draw after 90 minutes, the match went into extra time. In the event of a draw at the end of extra time, a penalty shoot-out was to decide which team qualified for the next round. No replays were foreseen in the entire competition.

== Round 1 ==
In the first round a total of 168 amateur clubs participated from the third-tier and lower. Reserve teams were not admitted to the competition. The 56 teams from the 1995–96 1. Liga were seeded and cound not be drawn against each other. The draw respected regionalities, when possible, and the lower classed team was granted home advantage.

Team 1	Score	Team 2
9 August 1995
FC Bottens	0–10	FC Renens
10 August 1995
FC Subingen	1–1 (a.e.t.) (5–4 p)	Dornach
FC Bad Ragaz	0–1	FC Uznach
11 August 1995
FC Vionnaz	1–2	FC Riddes
FC Domdidier	1–3	Fribourg
FC Develier	0–2	FC Olympic Fahy
Köniz	0–3	Münsingen
12 August 1995
US Boncourt	2–3	La Chaux-de-Fonds
FC Schwarzenburg	0–7	FC Langenthal
FC Worb	2–1	Thun
FC Wyler Bern	3–1	FC Herzogenbuchsee
FC Dulliken	2–3	FC Klus-Balstahl
FC Leuzigen	0–1	Grenchen
FC Therwil	1–3	FC Pratteln
FC Mellingen	2–3	Wohlen
Zofingen	2–3	FC Suhr
Kickers Luzern	3–1	FC Sursee
Luzerner Sport Club	1–3	Emmenbrücke
FC Willisau	4–1	FC Hochdorf
FC Dagmersellen	1–2	Schötz
FC Gunzwil	7–1	FC Küssnacht am Rigi
FC Entlebuch	1–9	Buochs
Uster	2–3	Bülach
Gossau	1–4	SV Schaffhausen
FC Bassersdorf	4–4 (a.e.t.) (5–4 p)	YF Juventus
SV Seebach (Zürich)	1–9	FC Seefeld Zürich
FC Glattfelden	1–9	FC Altstetten (Zürich)
FC Rüti	2–0	Freienbach
FC Lachen	0–1	Tuggen
Rapperswil-Jona	3–1 (a.e.t.)	Chur
FC Einsielden	1–2	FC Stäfa
FC Amriswil	2–2 (a.e.t.) (3–4 p)	Frauenfeld
Ibach	3–4	Mendrisio
FC Stabio	1–3	FC Tresa-Monteggio
Meyrin	5–0	Urania Genève Sport
FC Compesières	2–3	Grand-Lancy
FC Saint-Légier	0–1	CS La Tour-de-Peilz
FC Chêne-Aubonne	4–0	Le Mont-sur-Lausanne
FC Apples-Ballens	0–7	Echallens
FC Forward Morges	1–3	Stade Lausanne
FC Stade Payerne	0–1	Vevey Sports
Pully-Football	2–0	FC Lutry
FC Fully	1–3	Monthey
Bex	1–2	FC Raron
FC Collombey-Muraz	4–3 (a.e.t.)	FC Salgesch
FC Schmitten	0–2	Central Fribourg
FC Beauregard Fribourg	0–2	Bulle
FC Marin-Sport	1–0	FC Le Locle
FC La Tour/Le Pâquier	2–3	CS Romontois
13 August 1995
CS Italien GE	0–6	Chênois
FC Vernier	0–7	Stade Nyonnais
Athlétique Regina	1–2	Signal FC (Bernex)
ES Malley	1–2	Montreux-Sports
FC Saint-Gingolph	1–2	Martigny-Sports
FC Noiraigue	5–0	ASI Audax-Friul
FC Haute-Rive	0–1	Serrières
FC Fontainemelon	1–6	Colombier
FC Nidau	2–7	Moutier
FC Courtételle	3–0	FC Bözingen 34
Azzurri Bienne	0–4	Biel-Bienne
FC Lerchenfeld (Thun)	1–5	SV Lyss
FC Langnau im Emmental (BE)	0–4	Bümpliz
Muttenz	2–0	Old Boys
FC Biberist	2–5	FC Bellach
Concordia Basel	1–1 (a.e.t.) (4–3 p)	Nordstern Basel
FC Liestal	0–2	FC Riehen
FC Rothrist	2–3	FC Menziken
FC Veltheim (AG)	0–5	FC Kölliken
SC Veltheim (Winterthur)	1–0	FC Wiedikon
FC Oberentfelden	0–2	FC Muri (AG)
FC Beringen	3–4	FC Mönchaltdorf
FC Weinfelden-Bürglen	0–2	Red Star
FC Embrach	1–3	Blue Stars
FC Kollbrunn-Rikon	0–9	Zug 94
FC Affoltern am Albis	3–3 (a.e.t.) (3–5 p)	SV Höngg
FC Landquart	0–4	FC Glarus
FC Flawil	2–0	Brühl
Arbon	1–8	Gossau
FC Winkeln St. Gallen	7–0	Herisau
Blau-Weiss St. Gallen	0–1	FC Rorschach
FC Staad	2–1	St. Otmar St. Gallen
Biaschesi	1–2	FC Ascona
AS Lamone-Cadempino	2–2 (a.e.t.) (4–5 p)	AC Vallemaggia
Losone Sportiva	1–3	Bellinzona

== Round 2 ==
The teams from the 1995–96 Nationalliga B (NLB) were granted byes for the first round and joined the competition in the second round. These 12 teams were seeded and cound not be drawn against each other. The draw respected regionalities, when possible, and the lower classed team was granted home advantage.

Teams from the 1. Liga (third-tier) against teams from the NLB:

Team 1	Score	Team 2
2–3 September 1995
Buochs	0–0 (a.e.t.) (4–1 p)	Kriens
Mendrisio	1–5	Chiasso
Monthey	2–5	FC Naters

Teams from the 2. Liga (fourth-tier) against teams from the NLB:

Team 1	Score	Team 2
2–3 September 1995
FC Mönchaltdorf	0–6	FC Schaffhausen
CS La Tour-de-Peilz	0–3	Yverdon-Sports
FC Winkeln St.Gallen	2–3	Wil
Signal FC (Bernex)	2–7	Étoile Carouge
Moutier	3–7	Delémont
FC Flawil	0–5	Winterthur
Kickers Luzern	1–3	Locarno
FC Langenthal	1–4	Solothurn
Wohlen	1–5	Baden

Teams from the 1. Liga amongst themselves:

Team 1	Score	Team 2
2–3 September 1995
FC Altstetten (Zürich)	1–1 (a.e.t.) (4–5 p)	Zug 94
Bülach	0–1	Red Star
FC Suhr	2–5 (a.e.t.)	FC Muri (AG)
Gossau	1–0	FC Rorschach
Stade Nyonnais	1–5	Meyrin
Tuggen	3–1	FC Stäfa
Concordia Basel	6–0	La Chaux-de-Fonds
FC Renens	2–1	Stade Lausanne
Montreux-Sports	0–1	Bulle
FC Raron	2–1	Martigny-Sports
Grand-Lancy	0–3	Chênois
Echallens	0–1	Vevey Sports
FC Riehen	1–2	Biel-Bienne
FC Klus-Balstahl	3–0	Münsingen
FC Ascona	2–0	FC Tresa/Monteggio

Teams from the 2. Liga against teams from the 1. Liga:

Team 1	Score	Team 2
2–3 September 1995
FC Wyler Bern	0–2	Bümpliz
Rapperswil-Jona	5–1	FC Glarus
FC Gunzwil	2–1	Emmenbrücke
FC Marin Sport	1–1 (a.e.t.) (2–4 p)	Fribourg
CS Romontois	1–2 (a.e.t.)	SV Lyss
AC Vallemaggia	1–7	Bellinzona
FC Noiraigue	0–1	Colombier
SC Veltheim (Winterthur)	0–1	SV Schaffhausen
Central Fribourg	1–5	Serrières
FC Menziken	0–3	FC Kölliken
FC Subingen	1–0 (a.e.t.)	Grenchen

Teams from the 3. Liga against teams from the 1. Liga:

Team 1	Score	Team 2
2–3 September 1995
FC Staad	0–2	Frauenfeld

Teams from the 2. Liga amongst themselves:

Team 1	Score	Team 2
2–3 September 1995
FC Collombey-Muraz	4–5 (a.e.t.)	FC Riddes
FC Rüti	2–0	FC Bad Ragaz
SV Höngg	1–2	Blue Stars
FC Courtételle	3–6	Muttenz
FC Willisau	1–6	Schötz
FC Bellach	0–1	FC Worb
Pully-Football	4–1	FC Chêne-Aubonne

Teams from the 3. Liga against teams from the 2. Liga:

Team 1	Score	Team 2
2–3 September 1995
FC Olympic Fahy	0–0 (a.e.t.) (6–5 p)	FC Pratteln
FC Bassersdorf	1–3	FC Seefeld Zürich

== Round 3 ==
The first-tier clubs from the 1994–95 Nationalliga A were granted byes for the first two rounds, eight of them joined the competition in this round The four clubs that were competing in the UEFA European competitions, Grasshopper Club (1995–96 Champions League), Lugano, Xamax (both 1995–96 UEFA Cup) and Sion (1995–96 Cup Winners' Cup) were granted byes for this round as well. The eight participating first-tier teams were seeded and cound not be drawn against each other. The draw respected regionalities, when possible, and the lower classed team was granted home advantage.

=== Summary ===
Team 1	Score	Team 2
16 September 1995
Colombier	0–4	Young Boys
22 September 1995
Serrieres	3–2	SV Lyss
23 September 1995
Rapperswil-Jona	0–2	FC Schaffhausen
Pully Football	1–7	FC Renens
Fribourg	0–1	Bulle
FC Kölliken	2–4 (a.e.t.)	Concordia Basel
FC Worb	1–3	Bümpliz
FC Riddes	1–2	FC Raron
Schötz	3–2	Buochs
FC Subingen	1–6	Basel
Frauenfeld	0–5	St. Gallen
Gossau	3–1	Chiasso
Vevey Sports	0–1	Naters
Chênois	0–2	Servette
Yverdon-Sport	1–2 (a.e.t.)	Lausanne-Sport
Muttenz	1–3	Delémont
24 September 1995
Meyrin	3–1	Étoile-Carouge
Blue Stars	0–3	FC Seefeld Zürich
Bellinzona	0–0 (a.e.t.) (3–4 p)	FC Wil
Red Star	1–4	Zürich
Winterthur	0–3	Locarno
FC Klus-Balstahl	0–3	Luzern
FC Olympic Fahy	1–6	Baden
FC Gunzwil	1–0	FC Muri
FC Ascona	6–1	SV Schaffhausen
FC Rüti	1–2	Tuggen
Biel-Bienne	2–1	Solothurn
Zug 94	PP *	Aarau

- The match Zug–Aarau was postponed and played at a later date.

Rescheduled

Team 1	Score	Team 2
8 October 1995
Zug 94	0–3	Aarau

- Lugano, Xamax, Grasshopper Club and Sion were granted byes for this round.

=== Matches ===
16 September 1995

Colombier	0–4	Young Boys
	YB summary	23' (0:1) Sutter; 46' (0:2) Dittgen; 61' (0:3) Christensen; 75' (0:4) Streun

Stade des Chézards, Colombier
Attendance: 712
Referee: (Switzerland) Reto Rutz (Amriswil)

23 September 1995
17:00

FC Subingen	1–6	Basel
Styner 38' (1:3)	FCB summary	8' (0:1) Rey; 13' (0:2) Okolosi; 37' (0:3) Rey; 49' (1:4) Rey; (yellow card) 69' Walker; 75' (1:5) H. Yakin; 77' (pen.) Rey

Sportplatz Affoltern, Subingen
Attendance: 3,200
Referee: (Switzerland) Markus Nobs (Wohlen bei Bern)

23 September 1995

Chênois	0–2	Servette
	Servette summary	62' (0:1) Sogbie; 64' (0:2) Neuville

Stade des Trois-Chêne, Thônex

24 September 1995

Red Star	1–4	Zürich
Kocatürk 27' (1:1)	FCZ summary	3' (0:1) Andersen; 32' (1:2) Andersen; 34' (1:3) Di Jorio; 80' (1:4) Castillo

Allmend Brunau, Zürich
Attendance: 1,500
Referee: (Switzerland) Marcel Vollenweider (Rüti, Zürich)

8 October 1995

Zug 94	0–3	Aarau
	FCA summary	29' (0:1) Pavličević; 85' (0:2) Skrzypczak; 88' (0:3) Ratinho

Herti Allmend Stadion, Zug
Attendance: 1,050
Referee: (Switzerland) Jürg Herrmann (Hinterkapplen (Wohlen bei Bern))

== Round 4 ==
=== Summary ===
Team 1	Score	Team 2
9 March 1996
FC Renens	0–1	Servette
Serrieres	0–2	Delémont
Tuggen	0–2	Zürich
Baden	1–1 (a.e.t.) (3–5 p)	Grasshopper Club
Sion	3–0	Bulle
Locarno	0–1	FC Wil
Concordia Basel	0–2	Luzern
10 March 1996
Meyrin	1–2 (a.e.t.)	Young Boys
FC Raron	1–2	Biel-Bienne
Aarau	1–0	FC Lugano
FC Ascona	1–4	St. Gallen
Bümpliz	1–1 (a.e.t.) (9–8 p)	Naters
FC Gunzwil	0–2	FC Schaffhausen
Lausanne-Sport	2–5	Xamax
Schötz	2–0	FC Seefeld Zürich
Gossau	0–2	Basel

=== Matches ===
9 March 1996

FC Renens	0–1	Servette
	Servette summary	28' (0:1) Neuville

Zone sportive du Censuy, Renens

9 March 1996

Tuggen	0–2	Zürich
Wild (yellow card) 65'	FCZ summary	40' (0:1) Hodel; (yellow card) 64' Andersen; (yellow card) 70' Hodel; 82' (0:2) Di Jorio

Linthstrasse, Tuggen
Attendance: 2,100
Referee: (Switzerland) Hans Stadler

9 March 1996

Baden	1–1 (a.e.t.)	Grasshopper Club
Orsatti 38' (1:1)	RSSSF summary	3' (0:1) Vega
Penalties
Stiel (penalty scored); Rizzo (penalty scored); Casamento (penalty scored); Orsatti (penalty missed)	3–5	(penalty scored) Gren; (penalty scored) Vega; (penalty scored) Lombardo; (penalty scored) Haas; (penalty scored) Koller

Esp Stadium, Baden
Attendance: 2,032

10 March 1996

Meyrin	1–2 (a.e.t.)	Young Boys
Di Sanza 53' (1:1)	YB summary	8' (0:1) Gerber; 119' (1:2) Gerber

Stade des Arbères, Meyrin
Attendance: 1,300
Referee: (Switzerland) Serge Muhmenthaler (Grenchen)

10 March 1996

Aarau	1–0	FC Lugano
Kilian 75' (1:0)	FCA summary

Stadion Brügglifeld, Aarau
Attendance: 3,600
Referee: (Switzerland) Andreas Schluchter (Schönenbuch)

10 March 1996
15:00

Gossau	0–2	Basel
Schnelli (yellow card) 26'	FCB summary	(yellow card) 36' Meier; 36' (0:1) Nyarko; (yellow card) 44' Zuffi; 90+1' (0:2) Okolosi

Gemeindesportplatz, Gossau
Attendance: 2,500
Referee: (Switzerland) Urs Meier (Würenlos)

== Round 5 ==
=== Summary ===
Team 1	Score	Team 2
21 March 1996
Aarau	2–0	Zürich
Schötz	2–0 (a.e.t.)	FC Schaffhausen
FC Wil	1–2 (a.e.t.)	Luzern
Xamax	2–0	Bümpliz
Biel-Bienne	1–4	Basel
Delémont	1–2	Sion
St. Gallen	2–1	Grasshopper Club
Servette	3–1	Young Boys

=== Matches ===
21 March 1996

Aarau	2–0	Zürich
Ćirić 1' (1:0); Ćirić (yellow card) 18'; Ćirić 57' (2:0)	FCA summary FCA summary	(yellow card) 29' (yellow-red card) 72' Walker; (yellow card) 68' Nonda

Stadion Brügglifeld, Aarau
Attendance: 2,800
Referee: (Switzerland) Kurt Zuppinger (Bremgarten, Aargau)

21 March 1996

Schötz	2–0 (a.e.t.)	FC Schaffhausen
Rölli 97' (1:0); Rölli 102' (2:0)	RSSSF summary

Sportplatz Wissenhusen, Schötz
Attendance: 1,000
Referee: (Switzerland) Guido Wildhaber (Kerzers)

21 March 1996

FC Wil	1–2 (a.e.t.)	Luzern
Salvi 31' (1:1); Python (yellow card) 51'; Fuchs (yellow card) 107'; Šlekys (yellow card) 117'	RSSSF summary	8' (0:1) Bwalya; (yellow card) 39' Joller; 113' (1:2) Aleksandrov; (yellow card) 117'Aleksandrov

Stadion Bergholz, Wil
Attendance: 800
Referee: (Switzerland) Carlo Bertolini (Vira-Gambarogno)

21 March 1996

Xamax	2–0	Bümpliz
Wittl 23' (1:0); Panduru (yellow card) 37' (yellow-red card) 45'; Bonalair 90+2' (2:0)	RSSSF summary

Stade de la Maladière (1924), Neuchâtel
Attendance: 1,600
Referee: (Switzerland) Dominique Tavel (Lonay)

21 March 1996
20:00

Biel-Bienne	1–4	Basel
Eberhard (yellow card) 38'; Sahli 88' (pen.)	FCB summary	(yellow card) 29' Cantaluppi; 41' Rey; 53' Tabakovic; 67' Zuffi; 90' H. Yakin

Gurzelen Stadion, Biel/Bienne
Attendance: 3,798
Referee: (Liechtenstein) Roland Beck (Triesenberg)

21 March 1996

Delémont	1–2	Sion
Przybylo 81' (1:2)	RSSSF summary	41' (0:1) Mirandinha; 53' (0:2) Vidmar

La Blancherie, Delémont
Attendance: 3,250
Referee: (Switzerland) Markus Nobs (Wohlen bei Bern) ()

21 March 1996

St. Gallen	2–1	Grasshopper Club
Winkler 12' (1:0); Giannini 33' (2:0); Zellweger (yellow card) 86'	RSSSF summary	36' (2:1) Vega; (yellow card) 71' Vogel; (yellow card) 90' Vega

Espenmoos, St. Gallen
Attendance: 5,000
Referee: (Switzerland) Kurt Röthlisberger (Suhr, Aargau)

21 March 1996

Servette	3–1	Young Boys
Ippoliti 32' (1:0); Neuville 45' (2:0); Neuville 90' (3:1)	Servette summary YB summary	31' (2:1) Neqrouz

Charmilles Stadium, Geneva
Attendance: 1,700
Referee: (Switzerland) Marcel Vollenweider (Rüti, Zürich)

== Quarter-finals ==
=== Summary ===
Team 1	Score	Team 2
11 April 1996
Schötz	0–0 (a.e.t.) (1–4 p)	St. Gallen
Aarau	1–4	Servette
Sion	2–0	Luzern
23 April 1996
Xamax	2–1 (a.e.t.)	Basel

=== Matches ===
11 April 1996

Schötz	0–0 (a.e.t.)	St. Gallen
	RSSSF summary	(yellow card) 56' Milton; (yellow card) 75' Koch
Penalties
Penalty scored Penalty missed	1–4	Penalty scored

Sportplatz Wissenhusen (Kilchmatte), Schötz
Attendance: 3,100
Referee: (Switzerland) Dominique Tavel (Lonay)

11 April 1996

Aarau	1–4	Servette
Daniel Wyss 35' (pen.)	FCA summary Servette summary	8' (0:1) Neuville; 16' (0:2) Neuville; 37' (1:3) Neuville; 40' (1:4) Neuville

Stadion Brügglifeld, Aarau
Attendance: 4,900
Referee: (Switzerland) Cornu

11 April 1996

Sion	2–0	Luzern
Vercruysse 63' (1:0); Vidmar (yellow card) 78'; Vidmar 84' (2:0)	RSSSF summary	(yellow card) 69' Müller

Stade Tourbillon, Sion
Attendance: 10,000
Referee: (Switzerland) Serge Muhmenthaler (Grenchen)

23 April 1996
20:00

Xamax	2–1 (a.e.t.)	Basel
Kunz 16' (1:0); Bonalair (yellow card) 44'; Kunz 94' (2:1)	FCB summary	38' (1:1) H. Yakin; (yellow card) 28' (yellow-red card) 71' Nyarko; (yellow card) 111' Orlando

Stade de la Maladière (1924), Neuchâtel
Attendance: 4,400
Referee: (Switzerland) Kurt Röthlisberger (Suhr, Aargau)

== Semi-finals ==
=== Summary ===
Team 1	Score	Team 2
7 May 1996
Xamax	0–1 (a.e.t.)	Servette
Sion	2–1	St. Gallen

=== Matches ===
7 May 1996

Xamax	0–1 (a.e.t.)	Servette
Perret (yellow card) 89'	Sevette summary	(yellow card) 27' Pizzinat; (yellow card) 38' Varela; (yellow card) 80' (yellow-red card) 116' Ippoliti; 91' (0:1) Baumann

Stade de la Maladière (1924), Neuchâtel
Attendance: 5,500
Referee: (Switzerland) Karl Strässle (Steinach)

7 May 1996

Sion	2–1	St. Gallen
Vidmar 45' (pen.); Kombouaré (red card) 53'; Vidmar 70' (2:0); Vidmar (yellow card) 12' (yellow-red card) 87'	RSSSF summary	89' (pen.) Diallo

Stade Tourbillon, Sion
Attendance: 11,000
Referee: (Switzerland) Dieter Schoch (Attiswil)

== Final ==
=== Summary ===
Team 1	Score	Team 2
19 May 1996
Sion	3–2	Servette

=== Telegram ===
19 May 1996
15:00

Sion	3–2	Servette
Bonvin 64'; Wicky 67'; Quentin (yellow card) 72'; Vidmar 74'; Wicky (yellow card) 85'	Report	(yellow card) 5' Karlen; (yellow card) 18' Nemecek; 30' Karlen; 62' Neuville; (yellow card) 68' Barea

Wankdorf, Bern
Attendance: 27,500
Referee: (Switzerland) Urs Meier (Würenlos)

Sion won the cup and this was the club's 8th cup title to this date and their second in a row.

== See also ==
- 1995–96 Nationalliga A
- 1995–96 Nationalliga B
- 1995–96 Swiss 1. Liga

== Sources and references ==
- Switzerland 1995/96 at RSSSF

Preceded by 1994–95	Seasons in Swiss Cup	Succeeded by 1996–97
