= 1995–96 in Swiss football =

Football in Switzerland
- Season: 1995–96

Men's football
- Nationalliga A: Grasshopper Club
- Nationalliga B: Yverdon-Sport
- 1. Liga: Overall; Gossau; Group 1: FC Renens; Group 2: Fribourg; Group 3: Bellinzona; Group 4: Gossau

Women's football
- Swiss Women's Super League: FFC Bern
- Swiss Cup: FFC Bern

The following is a summary of the 1995–96 season of competitive football in Switzerland.

== Nationalliga A ==
=== Qualification phase ===
| Pos | Team | Pld | W | D | L | GF | GA | GD | Pts | Qualification |
|---|---|---|---|---|---|---|---|---|---|---|
| 1 | Grasshopper Club | 22 | 13 | 4 | 5 | 38 | 22 | +16 | 43 | Advance to championship round halved points (rounded up) as bonus |
| 2 | Sion | 22 | 13 | 3 | 6 | 37 | 28 | +9 | 42 | Advance to championship round halved points (rounded up) as bonus |
| 3 | Xamax | 22 | 12 | 5 | 5 | 40 | 24 | +16 | 41 | Advance to championship round halved points (rounded up) as bonus |
| 4 | Luzern | 22 | 11 | 7 | 4 | 36 | 25 | +11 | 40 | Advance to championship round halved points (rounded up) as bonus |
| 5 | Basel | 22 | 9 | 3 | 10 | 23 | 29 | −6 | 30 | Advance to championship round halved points (rounded up) as bonus |
| 6 | Servette | 22 | 7 | 7 | 8 | 28 | 28 | 0 | 28 | Advance to championship round halved points (rounded up) as bonus |
| 7 | Aarau | 22 | 7 | 6 | 9 | 36 | 27 | +9 | 27 | Advance to championship round halved points (rounded up) as bonus |
| 8 | St. Gallen | 22 | 6 | 9 | 7 | 26 | 24 | +2 | 27 | Advance to championship round halved points (rounded up) as bonus |
| 9 | Lausanne-Sport | 22 | 6 | 9 | 7 | 25 | 25 | 0 | 27 | Continue to promotion/relegation round |
| 10 | Lugano | 22 | 5 | 6 | 11 | 21 | 42 | −21 | 21 | Continue to promotion/relegation round |
| 11 | Zürich | 22 | 4 | 6 | 12 | 17 | 32 | −15 | 18 | Continue to promotion/relegation round |
| 12 | Young Boys | 22 | 4 | 5 | 13 | 14 | 35 | −21 | 17 | Continue to promotion/relegation round |

Source: rsssf.com
Rules for classification: 1) Points; 2) Goal difference; 3) Goals scored; 4) Head-to-head points; 5) Away goals scored; 6) Draw.

=== Championship group ===
The first eight teams of the qualification phase competed in the Championship round. The teams took half of the points (rounded up to complete units) gained in the qualification as bonus with them.

| Pos | Team | Pld | W | D | L | GF | GA | GD | BP | Pts | Qualification |
|---|---|---|---|---|---|---|---|---|---|---|---|
| 1 | Grasshopper Club | 14 | 8 | 6 | 0 | 26 | 7 | +19 | 22 | 52 | Swiss champions, qualified for 1996–97 Champions League |
| 2 | Sion | 14 | 8 | 2 | 4 | 20 | 14 | +6 | 21 | 47 | Swiss Cup winners, qualified for 1996–97 Cup Winners' Cup |
| 3 | Xamax | 14 | 5 | 7 | 2 | 21 | 16 | +5 | 21 | 43 | qualified for 1996–97 UEFA Cup |
| 4 | Aarau | 14 | 7 | 4 | 3 | 23 | 18 | +5 | 14 | 39 | qualified for 1996–97 UEFA Cup |
| 5 | Luzern | 14 | 4 | 3 | 7 | 23 | 19 | +4 | 20 | 35 | entered 1996 UEFA Intertoto Cup |
| 6 | Basel | 14 | 3 | 4 | 7 | 11 | 20 | −9 | 15 | 28 | entered 1996 UEFA Intertoto Cup |
| 7 | Servette | 14 | 2 | 5 | 7 | 18 | 25 | −7 | 14 | 25 | |
| 8 | St. Gallen | 14 | 2 | 3 | 9 | 11 | 34 | −23 | 14 | 23 | |

Source: rsssf.com
Rules for classification: 1) points; 2) Position in the qualification.

== Nationalliga B ==
=== Qualification phase ===
| Pos | Team | Pld | W | D | L | GF | GA | GD | Pts | Qualification or relegation |
|---|---|---|---|---|---|---|---|---|---|---|
| 1 | Kriens | 22 | 14 | 2 | 6 | 43 | 23 | +20 | 44 | Advance to promotion/relegation NLA/LNB round |
| 2 | Yverdon-Sport | 22 | 11 | 5 | 6 | 41 | 23 | +18 | 38 | Advance to promotion/relegation NLA/LNB round |
| 3 | Delémont | 22 | 11 | 5 | 6 | 40 | 33 | +7 | 38 | Advance to promotion/relegation NLA/LNB round |
| 4 | Étoile Carouge | 22 | 9 | 8 | 5 | 26 | 24 | +2 | 35 | Advance to promotion/relegation NLA/LNB round |
| 5 | Winterthur | 22 | 9 | 5 | 8 | 26 | 21 | +5 | 32 | Continue to relegation round NLB/1. Liga halved points (rounded up) as bonus |
| 6 | Baden | 22 | 9 | 5 | 8 | 31 | 27 | +4 | 32 | Continue to relegation round NLB/1. Liga halved points (rounded up) as bonus |
| 7 | FC Schaffhausen | 22 | 7 | 7 | 8 | 33 | 31 | +2 | 28 | Continue to relegation round NLB/1. Liga halved points (rounded up) as bonus |
| 8 | Wil | 22 | 7 | 7 | 8 | 34 | 36 | −2 | 28 | Continue to relegation round NLB/1. Liga halved points (rounded up) as bonus |
| 9 | Chiasso | 22 | 6 | 7 | 9 | 19 | 25 | −6 | 25 | Continue to relegation round NLB/1. Liga halved points (rounded up) as bonus |
| 10 | Solothurn | 22 | 6 | 5 | 11 | 26 | 37 | −11 | 23 | Continue to relegation round NLB/1. Liga halved points (rounded up) as bonus |
| 11 | Locarno | 22 | 5 | 6 | 11 | 20 | 33 | −13 | 21 | Continue to relegation round NLB/1. Liga halved points (rounded up) as bonus |
| 12 | Naters | 22 | 4 | 6 | 12 | 16 | 42 | −26 | 18 | Continue to relegation round NLB/1. Liga halved points (rounded up) as bonus |

Source: rsssf.com
Rules for classification: 1) Points; 2) Goal difference; 3) Goals scored; 4) Head-to-head points; 5) Away goals scored; 6) Draw.

=== Promotion/relegation group NLA/NLB ===
The teams in the ninth to twelfth positions in Nationalliga A competed with the top four teams of Nationalliga B in a Nationalliga A/B promotion/relegation round.

| Pos | Team | Pld | W | D | L | GF | GA | GD | Pts | Qualification |
|---|---|---|---|---|---|---|---|---|---|---|
| 1 | Young Boys | 14 | 10 | 3 | 1 | 28 | 13 | +15 | 33 | Remain in 1996–97 Nationalliga A |
| 2 | Zürich | 14 | 8 | 4 | 2 | 21 | 12 | +9 | 28 | Remain in 1996–97 Nationalliga A |
| 3 | Lausanne-Sport | 14 | 7 | 6 | 1 | 24 | 10 | +14 | 27 | Remain in 1996–97 Nationalliga A |
| 4 | Lugano | 14 | 4 | 5 | 5 | 13 | 17 | −4 | 17 | Remain in 1996–97 Nationalliga A |
| 5 | Yverdon-Sport | 14 | 3 | 4 | 7 | 16 | 22 | −6 | 13 | Remain in Nationalliga B |
| 6 | Delémont | 14 | 3 | 4 | 7 | 17 | 26 | −9 | 13 | Remain in Nationalliga B |
| 7 | Kriens | 14 | 2 | 5 | 7 | 14 | 22 | −8 | 11 | Remain in Nationalliga B |
| 8 | Etoile-Carouge | 14 | 1 | 5 | 8 | 9 | 20 | −11 | 8 | Remain in Nationalliga B |

Source: rsssf.com
Rules for classification: 1) Points; 2) Goal difference; 3) Goals scored; 4) Head-to-head points; 5) Away goals scored; 6) Draw.

=== Relegation group NLB/1. Liga ===
The last eight teams of the qualification phase competed in the relegation group against relegation to the 1. Liga. The teams took half of the points (rounded up to complete units) gained in the qualification as bonus with them.

| Pos | Team | Pld | W | D | L | GF | GA | GD | BP | Pts | Qualification or relegation |
|---|---|---|---|---|---|---|---|---|---|---|---|
| 1 | Winterthur | 14 | 7 | 5 | 2 | 27 | 18 | +9 | 16 | 42 | Remain in NLB |
| 2 | Baden | 14 | 7 | 1 | 6 | 21 | 22 | −1 | 16 | 38 | Remain in NLB |
| 3 | Wil | 14 | 6 | 5 | 3 | 28 | 18 | +10 | 14 | 37 | Remain in NLB |
| 4 | FC Schaffhausen | 14 | 6 | 4 | 4 | 15 | 16 | −1 | 14 | 36 | Remain in NLB |
| 5 | Solothurn | 14 | 4 | 4 | 6 | 13 | 23 | −10 | 12 | 28 | Remain in NLB |
| 6 | Locarno | 14 | 3 | 6 | 5 | 18 | 17 | +1 | 11 | 26 | Remain in NLB |
| 7 | Naters | 14 | 4 | 5 | 5 | 13 | 14 | −1 | 9 | 26 | Relegated to 1. Liga |
| 8 | Chiasso | 14 | 1 | 6 | 7 | 13 | 20 | −7 | 13 | 22 | Relegated to 1. Liga |

Source: RSSSF
Rules for classification: 1) points; 2) Position in the qualification.

== 1. Liga ==
=== Group 1 ===
| Pos | Team | Pld | W | D | L | GF | GA | GD | Pts | Qualification or relegation |
|---|---|---|---|---|---|---|---|---|---|---|
| 1 | FC Renens | 26 | 16 | 8 | 2 | 57 | 23 | +34 | 56 | Play-off to Nationalliga B |
| 2 | FC Meyrin | 26 | 18 | 2 | 6 | 57 | 25 | +32 | 56 | Play-off to Nationalliga B |
| 3 | CS Chênois | 26 | 17 | 4 | 5 | 56 | 26 | +30 | 55 | |
| 4 | FC Stade Nyonnais | 26 | 15 | 7 | 4 | 69 | 30 | +39 | 52 | |
| 5 | FC Bulle | 26 | 12 | 6 | 8 | 42 | 33 | +9 | 42 | |
| 6 | FC Monthey | 26 | 11 | 8 | 7 | 52 | 36 | +16 | 41 | |
| 7 | FC Martigny-Sports | 26 | 10 | 8 | 8 | 52 | 49 | +3 | 38 | |
| 8 | Grand-Lancy FC | 26 | 10 | 6 | 10 | 39 | 43 | −4 | 36 | |
| 9 | FC Echallens | 26 | 9 | 4 | 13 | 37 | 50 | −13 | 31 | |
| 10 | FC Stade Lausanne | 26 | 8 | 6 | 12 | 29 | 42 | −13 | 30 | |
| 11 | FC Montreux-Sports | 26 | 7 | 5 | 14 | 30 | 48 | −18 | 26 | |
| 12 | Vevey Sports | 26 | 5 | 7 | 14 | 31 | 53 | −22 | 22 | Play-out against relegation |
| 13 | FC Fully | 26 | 4 | 4 | 18 | 37 | 80 | −43 | 16 | Relegation to 2. Liga |
| 14 | FC Raron | 26 | 1 | 3 | 22 | 19 | 69 | −50 | 6 | Relegation to 2. Liga |

Source: RSSSF
Rules for classification: 1) Points; 2) Goal difference within the league, but play-off for qualifiers.

=== Group 2 ===
| Pos | Team | Pld | W | D | L | GF | GA | GD | Pts | Qualification or relegation |
|---|---|---|---|---|---|---|---|---|---|---|
| 1 | FC Fribourg | 26 | 21 | 3 | 2 | 66 | 18 | +48 | 66 | Play-off to Nationalliga B |
| 2 | FC Münsingen | 26 | 14 | 5 | 7 | 47 | 30 | +17 | 47 | Play-off to Nationalliga B |
| 3 | FC Grenchen | 26 | 12 | 10 | 4 | 42 | 26 | +16 | 46 | |
| 4 | FC Thun | 26 | 14 | 2 | 10 | 46 | 38 | +8 | 44 | |
| 5 | FC Biel-Bienne | 26 | 11 | 6 | 9 | 40 | 28 | +12 | 39 | |
| 6 | FC Colombier | 26 | 11 | 6 | 9 | 38 | 30 | +8 | 39 | |
| 7 | SV Lyss | 26 | 9 | 11 | 6 | 39 | 39 | 0 | 38 | |
| 8 | FC Serrières | 26 | 9 | 7 | 10 | 43 | 36 | +7 | 34 | |
| 9 | FC La Chaux-de-Fonds | 26 | 9 | 4 | 13 | 33 | 46 | −13 | 31 | |
| 10 | SC Bümpliz 78] | 26 | 8 | 6 | 12 | 38 | 44 | −6 | 30 | |
| 11 | FC Concordia Basel | 26 | 9 | 2 | 15 | 40 | 58 | −18 | 29 | |
| 12 | FC Riehen | 26 | 7 | 7 | 12 | 44 | 46 | −2 | 28 | Play-out against relegation |
| 13 | BSC Old Boys | 26 | 6 | 5 | 15 | 30 | 58 | −28 | 23 | Relegation to 2. Liga |
| 14 | FC Le Locle | 26 | 2 | 6 | 18 | 13 | 62 | −49 | 12 | Relegation to 2. Liga |

Source: RSSSF
Rules for classification: 1) Points; 2) Goal difference within the league, but play-off for qualifiers.

=== Group 3 ===
| Pos | Team | Pld | W | D | L | GF | GA | GD | Pts | Qualification or relegation |
|---|---|---|---|---|---|---|---|---|---|---|
| 1 | AC Bellinzona | 26 | 20 | 5 | 1 | 66 | 13 | +53 | 65 | Play-off to Nationalliga B |
| 2 | FC Ascona | 26 | 15 | 7 | 4 | 44 | 23 | +21 | 52 | Decider winners, play-off to Nationalliga B |
| 3 | SC Buochs | 26 | 15 | 7 | 4 | 50 | 22 | +28 | 52 | Decider for play-off |
| 4 | Zug 94 | 26 | 12 | 7 | 7 | 35 | 24 | +11 | 43 | |
| 5 | FC Freienbach | 26 | 11 | 8 | 7 | 40 | 38 | +2 | 41 | |
| 6 | FC Muri | 26 | 9 | 4 | 13 | 29 | 35 | −6 | 31 | |
| 7 | FC Suhr | 26 | 6 | 13 | 7 | 28 | 34 | −6 | 31 | |
| 8 | FC Klus-Balsthal | 26 | 7 | 10 | 9 | 36 | 43 | −7 | 31 | |
| 9 | FC Sursee | 26 | 8 | 6 | 12 | 29 | 36 | −7 | 30 | |
| 10 | FC Hochdorf | 26 | 7 | 8 | 11 | 25 | 33 | −8 | 29 | |
| 11 | FC Mendrisio | 26 | 8 | 5 | 13 | 25 | 41 | −16 | 29 | |
| 12 | FC Emmenbrücke | 26 | 8 | 4 | 14 | 29 | 47 | −18 | 28 | Play-out against relegation |
| 13 | FC Tresa-Monteggio | 26 | 6 | 6 | 14 | 25 | 35 | −10 | 24 | Relegation to 2. Liga |
| 14 | FC Kölliken | 26 | 3 | 4 | 19 | 19 | 56 | −37 | 13 | Relegation to 2. Liga |

Source: RSSSF
Rules for classification: 1) Points; 2) Goal difference within the league, but play-off for qualifiers.

==== Decider ====
The decider for second position in the table was played 21 May 1996 in Stadio Comunale Bellinzona.

| Team 1 | Score | Team 2 |
|---|---|---|
| FC Ascona | 2–0 | SC Buochs |

FC Ascona advance to play-offs.

=== Group 4 ===
| Pos | Team | Pld | W | D | L | GF | GA | GD | Pts | Qualification or relegation |
|---|---|---|---|---|---|---|---|---|---|---|
| 1 | FC Gossau | 26 | 16 | 4 | 6 | 66 | 29 | +37 | 52 | Play-off to Nationalliga B |
| 2 | FC Altstetten | 26 | 13 | 8 | 5 | 53 | 28 | +25 | 47 | Play-off to Nationalliga B |
| 3 | FC Tuggen | 26 | 13 | 6 | 7 | 46 | 31 | +15 | 45 | |
| 4 | FC Frauenfeld | 26 | 10 | 10 | 6 | 33 | 26 | +7 | 40 | |
| 5 | FC Rorschach | 26 | 10 | 8 | 8 | 40 | 37 | +3 | 38 | |
| 6 | FC Dübendorf | 26 | 10 | 6 | 10 | 46 | 49 | −3 | 36 | |
| 7 | FC Red Star Zürich | 26 | 10 | 6 | 10 | 40 | 44 | −4 | 36 | |
| 8 | SC Young Fellows Juventus | 26 | 9 | 8 | 9 | 36 | 35 | +1 | 35 | |
| 9 | FC Glarus | 26 | 9 | 8 | 9 | 40 | 46 | −6 | 35 | |
| 10 | FC Bülach | 26 | 9 | 7 | 10 | 36 | 44 | −8 | 34 | |
| 11 | SV Schaffhausen | 26 | 8 | 8 | 10 | 29 | 36 | −7 | 32 | |
| 12 | FC Vaduz | 26 | 7 | 8 | 11 | 26 | 38 | −12 | 29 | Play-out against relegation |
| 13 | SC Brühl | 26 | 6 | 5 | 15 | 34 | 60 | −26 | 23 | Relegation to 2. Liga |
| 14 | FC Stäfa | 26 | 4 | 4 | 18 | 26 | 48 | −22 | 16 | Relegation to 2. Liga |

Source: RSSSF
Rules for classification: 1) Points; 2) Goal difference within the league, but play-off for qualifiers.

=== Promotion play-off ===
Qualification round

| Team 1 | Score | Team 2 |
|---|---|---|
| FC Altstetten | 0–1 | AC Bellinzona |
| AC Bellinzona | 1–1 | FC Altstetten |

AC Bellinzona win 2–1 on aggregate and continue to the finals.

| Team 1 | Score | Team 2 |
|---|---|---|
| FC Ascona | 1–1 | FC Gossau |
| FC Gossau | 4–3 | FC Ascona |

FC Gossau win 5–4 on aggregate and continue to the finals.

| Team 1 | Score | Team 2 |
|---|---|---|
| FC Münsingen | 1–0 | FC Renens |
| FC Renens | 1–0 | FC Münsingen |

1–1 on aggregate. FC Renens win 6–5 in penalties and continue to the finals.

| Team 1 | Score | Team 2 |
|---|---|---|
| FC Meyrin | 0–0 | FC Fribourg |
| FC Fribourg | 0–2 | FC Meyrin |

FC Meyrin win 2–0 on aggregate and continue to the finals.

Final round

| Team 1 | Score | Team 2 |
|---|---|---|
| FC Gossau | 1–0 | AC Bellinzona |
| AC Bellinzona | 0–3 | FC Gossau |

FC Gossau win 4–0 on aggregate and are promoted to Nationalliga B.

| Team 1 | Score | Team 2 |
|---|---|---|
| FC Meyrin | 2–2 | FC Renens |
| FC Renens | 2–6 | FC Meyrin |

FC Meyrin win 8–4 on aggregate and are promoted to Nationalliga B.

=== Relegation play-out ===
First round

| Team 1 | Score | Team 2 |
|---|---|---|
| FC Vaduz | 5–0 | FC Emmenbrücke |

FC Emmenbrücke continue to the finals.

| Team 1 | Score | Team 2 |
|---|---|---|
| FC Riehen | 4–0 | Vevey Sports |

Vevey Sports continue to the finals.

Final round

| Team 1 | Score | Team 2 |
|---|---|---|
| Vevey Sports | 1–1 | FC Emmenbrücke |
| FC Emmenbrücke | 1–6 | Vevey Sports |

Vevey Sports win 7–2 on aggregate and remain in the 1. Liga. FC Emmenbrücke are relegated to 2. Liga.

== Swiss Cup ==
The route of the finalists to the final:

- Round 3: Sion bye. CS Chênois-Servette 0–2.
- Round 4: Sion-FC Bulle 3–0. FC Renens-Servette 0–1.
- Round 5: SR Delémont-Sion 1–2 . Servette-BSC Young Boys 3–1.
- Quarter-finals: Sion-FC Luzern 2–0. FC Aarau-Servette 1–4.
- Semi-finals: Sion-FC St. Gallen 2–1. Neuchâtel Xamax FC-Servette 0–1 a.e.t.

The winners of the first drawn semi-final is considered as home team in the final.

=== Final ===
19 May 1996
15:00

| FC Sion | 3 – 2 | Servette FC |
|---|---|---|
| Bonvin 64'; Wicky 67'; Vidmar 74' | Report | 30' Karlen; 62' Neuville |

Wankdorf, Bern
Attendance: 27,500
Referee: (Switzerland) Urs Meier (Würenlos)

== Swiss Clubs in Europe ==
- Grasshopper Club as 1994–95 Nationalliga A champions: 1995–96 UEFA Champions League qualifying round
- Lugano as league runners-up: 1995–96 UEFA Cup Preliminary round
- Xamax as third placed team: 1995–96 UEFA Cup Preliminary round
- Sion as 1994–95 Swiss Cup winners: 1995–96 Cup Winners' Cup qualifying round
- Aarau: 1995 UEFA Intertoto Cup
- Luzern: 1995 UEFA Intertoto Cup
- Basel: 1995 UEFA Intertoto Cup
- Vaduz as 1994–95 Liechtenstein Cup winners: 1995–96 Cup Winners' Cup qualifying round

=== Grasshopper Club ===
==== Champions League ====
===== Qualifying round =====
| 9 August 1995 First leg | Grasshopper Club (Switzerland) | 1–1 | (Israel) Maccabi Tel Aviv | Hardturm, Zürich |
| 20:15 | Ibrahim 49' | Report | Kashentsev 54' | Attendance: 11,100; Referee: Juan Ansuátegui Roca (Spain) |

| 23 August 1995 Second leg | Maccabi Tel Aviv (Israel) | 0–1 | (Switzerland) Grasshopper Club | Bloomfield, Tel Aviv |
| 18:00 | | Report | Comisetti 4' | Attendance: 15,432; Referee: Marcello Nicchi (Italy) |

Grasshopper Club won 2–1 on aggregate

===== Group stage =====
| 13 September 1995 Matchday 1 | Grasshopper Club (Switzerland) | 0–3 | (Hungary) Ferencváros | Hardturm, Zürich |
| 20:30 | Gren (red card) 33' | Report | Lisztes 61'; Vincze 81', 90' | Attendance: 15,350; Referee: Rune Pedersen (Norway) |

| 27 September 1995 Matchday 2 | Real Madrid (Spain) | 2–0 | (Switzerland) Grasshopper Club | Santiago Bernabéu, Madrid |
| 20:30 | Zamorano 69', 89' | Report | | Attendance: 62,000; Referee: Zbigniew Przesmycki (Poland) |

| 18 October 1995 Matchday 3 | Ajax (Netherlands) | 3–0 | (Switzerland) Grasshopper Club | Olympic Stadium, Amsterdam |
| 20:30 | Kluivert 12', 68'; Finidi 87' | Report | | Attendance: 41,000; Referee: Adrian Porumboiu (Romania) |

| 1 November 1995 Matchday 4 | Grasshopper Club (Switzerland) | 0–0 | (Netherlands) Ajax | Hardturm, Zürich |
| 20:30 | | Report | | Attendance: 20,100; Referee: Nikolay Levnikov (Russia) |

| 22 November 1995 Matchday 5 | Ferencváros (Hungary) | 3–3 | (Switzerland) Grasshopper Club | Üllői út, Budapest |
| 20:30 | Albert 20'; Lisztes 24'; Nyilas 85' (pen.) | Report | Subiat 21'; Comisetti 47'; Ibrahim 64' | Attendance: 14,864; Referee: Kim Milton Nielsen (Denmark) |

| 6 December 1995 Matchday 6 | Grasshopper Club (Switzerland) | 0–2 | (Spain) Real Madrid | Hardturm, Zürich |
| 20:30 | | Report | Raúl 55'; Míchel 67' | Attendance: 20,100; Referee: Jim McCluskey (Scotland) |

Final table

| Pos | Team | Pld | W | D | L | GF | GA | GD | Pts | Qualification | AJA | RM | FER | GC |
|---|---|---|---|---|---|---|---|---|---|---|---|---|---|---|
| 1 | (Netherlands) Ajax | 6 | 5 | 1 | 0 | 15 | 1 | +14 | 16 | Advance to knockout stage | — | 1–0 | 4–0 | 3–0 |
| 2 | (Spain) Real Madrid | 6 | 3 | 1 | 2 | 11 | 5 | +6 | 10 | Advance to knockout stage | 0–2 | — | 6–1 | 2–0 |
| 3 | (Hungary) Ferencváros | 6 | 1 | 2 | 3 | 9 | 19 | −10 | 5 | | 1–5 | 1–1 | — | 3–3 |
| 4 | (Switzerland) Grasshopper Club | 6 | 0 | 2 | 4 | 3 | 13 | −10 | 2 | | 0–0 | 0–2 | 0–3 | — |

Source: UEFA

=== Lugano ===
==== UEFA Cup ====
===== Preliminary round =====
| 8 August 1995 First leg | Jeunesse Esch (Luxembourg) | 0–0 | (Switzerland) Lugano | Esch-sur-Alzette |
| | | Report |

| 23 August 1995 Second leg | Lugano (Switzerland) | 4–0 | (Luxembourg) Jeunesse Esch | Lugano |
| | Erceg 18', 54', 45'; Esposito 34' | Report |

Lugano won 4-0 on aggregate.

===== First round =====
| 12 September 1995 First leg | Lugano (Switzerland) | 1–1 | (Italy) Internazionale | Cornaredo Stadium, Lugano |
| | Carrasco 67' | Report | Roberto Carlos 12' | Attendance: 12,000; Referee: Dick Jol (Netherlands) |

| 26 September 1995 Second leg | Internazionale (Italy) | 0–1 | (Switzerland) Lugano | San Siro, Milan |
| | | Report | Carrasco 85' | Attendance: 15,955; Referee: Hans-Jürgen Weber (Germany) |

Lugano won 2–1 on aggregate.

===== Second round =====
| 17 October 1995 First leg | Lugano (Switzerland) | 1–2 | (Czech Republic) Slavia Prague | Lugano |
| | Shalimov 83' | Report | Vágner 19'; Pěnička 25' |

| 31 October 1995 Second leg | Slavia Prague (Czech Republic) | 1–0 | (Switzerland) Lugano | Prague |
| | Šmicer 62' | Report |

Slavia Prague won 3–1 on aggregate.

=== Xamax ===
==== UEFA Cup ====
===== Preliminary round =====
| 8 August 1995 First leg | Red Star Belgrade (Federal Republic of Yugoslavia) | 0–1 | (Switzerland) Xamax | Red Star Stadium, Belgrade |
| 20:00 | | Report | Wittl 86' | Attendance: 59,000; Referee: Alain Sars (France) |

| 22 August 1995 Second leg | Xamax (Switzerland) | 0–0 | (Federal Republic of Yugoslavia) Red Star Belgrade | Stade de la Maladière, Xamax |
| 20:00 | | Report | | Attendance: 12,000; Referee: Bernd Heynemann (Germany) |

Xamax won 1–0 on aggregate.

===== First round =====
| 12 September 1995 First leg | Xamax (Switzerland) | 1–1 | (Italy) Roma | Neuchâtel |
| | Jeanneret 14' | Report | Moriero 20' |

| 26 September 1995 Second leg | Roma (Italy) | 4–0 | (Switzerland) Xamax | Rome |
| | Balbo 26', 35'; Fonseca 32'; Rueda 55' (o.g.) | Report |

Roma won 5–1 on aggregate.

=== Sion ===
==== Cup Winners' Cup ====
===== Qualifying round =====
| 10 August 1995 First leg | Tiligul Tiraspol (Moldova) | 0–0 | (Switzerland) Sion | Stadionul Republican, Chișinău |
| 19:30 | | Report | | Attendance: 4,500; Referee: Vesselin Bogdanov (Bulgaria) |

| 23 August 1995 Second leg | Sion (Switzerland) | 3–2 | (Moldova) Tiligul Tiraspol | Stade Tourbillon, Sion |
| 20:15 | Moser 22'; Herr 28'; Bonvin 44' | | Oprea 79'; Popovici 90' | Attendance: 6,500; Referee: Theodoros Kefalas (Greece) |

Sion won 3–2 on aggregate.

===== First round =====
| 14 September 1995 First leg | AEK Athens (Greece) | 2–0 | (Switzerland) Sion | Nikos Goumas Stadium, Athens |
| 21:00 | Vlachos 45'; Borbokis 70' | Report | | Attendance: 20,740; Referee: Frans van den Wijngaert (Belgium) |

| 28 September 1995 Second leg | Sion (Switzerland) | 2–2 | (Greece) AEK Athens | Stade Tourbillon, Sion |
| 20:30 | Bonvin 20'; Giallanza 84' | Report | Ketsbaia 82'; Batista 87' | Attendance: 6,900; Referee: Loris Stafoggia (Italy) |

AEK Athens won 4–2 on aggregate.

=== Aarau ===
==== Intertoto Cup ====
===== Group 3 =====
| 25 June 1995 Matchday 1 | Aarau (Switzerland) | 2–2 | (Norway) Tromsø | Stadion Brügglifeld, Aarau |
| 17:00 | Kilian 73'; Wiederkehr 89' | Report | Flo 61'; Berg Johansen 86' | Attendance: 2,430; Referee: Štefan Tivold (Slovenia) |

| 2 July 1995 Matchday 2 | Germinal Ekeren (Belgium) | 3–3 | (Switzerland) Aarau | Stadion Louis Lucas, Kapellen |
| 16:00 | Kinet 10'; Lukaku 16'; Radzinski 85' | Report | Wiederkehr 20'; Wyss 21'; Allenspach 71' | Attendance: 1,500; Referee: Georg Dardenne (Germany) |

| 16 July 1995 Matchday 4 | Aarau (Switzerland) | 6–1 | (Faroe Islands) HB Tórshavn | Stadion Brügglifeld, Aarau |
| 17:00 | Skrzypczak 13', 26', 49', 54'; Wiederkehr 15'; Saibene 58' | Report | Mohr 36' | Attendance: 1,610; Referee: Charles Schaak (Luxembourg) |

| 23 July 1995 Matchday 5 | Universitatea Cluj (Romania) | 2–3 | (Switzerland) Aarau | Stadionul Ion Moina, Cluj-Napoca |
| | Falub 58'; Șandru 74' | Report | Ratinho 20'; Allenspach 67'; Wyss 76' | Attendance: 500; Referee: Zygmunt Ziober (Poland) |

Final table

| Pos | Team | Pld | W | D | L | GF | GA | GD | Pts | Qualification | AAR | GER | TRO | TÓR | UCL |
|---|---|---|---|---|---|---|---|---|---|---|---|---|---|---|---|
| 1 | (Switzerland) Aarau | 4 | 2 | 2 | 0 | 14 | 8 | +6 | 8 | Advanced to round of 16 | — | — | 2–2 | 6–1 | — |
| 2 | (Belgium) Germinal Ekeren | 4 | 2 | 2 | 0 | 10 | 5 | +5 | 8 | | 3–3 | — | — | — | 4–1 |
| 3 | (Norway) Tromsø | 4 | 2 | 1 | 1 | 13 | 4 | +9 | 7 | | — | 0–2 | — | 10–0 | — |
| 4 | (Faroe Islands) HB Tórshavn | 4 | 0 | 2 | 2 | 2 | 17 | −15 | 2 | | — | 1–1 | — | — | 0–0 |
| 5 | (Romania) Universitatea Cluj | 4 | 0 | 1 | 3 | 3 | 8 | −5 | 1 | | 2–3 | — | 0–1 | — | — |

Source: rsssf.com

===== Round of 16 =====
| 29 July 1995 One match only | Aarau (Switzerland) | 1–2 (a.e.t.) | (Germany) Karlsruhe | Stadion Brügglifeld, Aarau |
| | Saibene 90+1' | Report | Schuster 87'; Knup 97' | Attendance: 6,700; Referee: António José Almeida Marçal (Portugal) |

=== Luzern ===
==== Intertoto Cup ====
===== Group 2 =====
| 25 June 1995 Matchday 1 | Tottenham Hotspur (England) | 0–2^{1} | (Switzerland) Luzern | Goldstone Ground, Hove |
| | | Report | Fink 69'; Aleksandrov 87' | Attendance: 2,497; Referee: Bertrand Saules (France) |

| 1 July 1995 Matchday 2 | Luzern (Switzerland) | 3–2 | (Sweden) Öster | Stadion Allmend, Lucerne |
| | Fink 34'; Aleksandrov 42', 61' | | Eklund 23'; Axeldal 71' | Attendance: 2,000; Referee: Alain Hamer (Luxembourg) |

| 8 July 1995 Matchday 3 | Köln (Germany) | 2–2 | (Switzerland) Luzern | Müngersdorferstadion, Cologne |
| 15:30 | Labbadia 12'; Baumann 14' | Report | Wolf 28'; Aleksandrov 69' | Attendance: 5,300; Referee: Hugo Luyten (Netherlands) |

| 22 July 1995 Matchday 5 | Luzern (Switzerland) | 1–1 | (Slovenia) Rudar Velenje | Stadion Allmend, Lucerne |
| | Fink 10' | | Cvikl 56' | Attendance: 2,000; Referee: Gianni Beschin (Italy) |

^{1}Played at Brighton & Hove Albion's Goldstone Ground as White Hart Lane was unavailable

Final table

| Pos | Team | Pld | W | D | L | GF | GA | GD | Pts | Qualification | KÖL | LUZ | ÖST | TOT | RUD |
|---|---|---|---|---|---|---|---|---|---|---|---|---|---|---|---|
| 1 | (Germany) Köln | 4 | 2 | 2 | 0 | 11 | 2 | +9 | 8 | Advanced to round of 16 | — | 2–2 | — | 8–0 | — |
| 2 | (Switzerland) Luzern | 4 | 2 | 2 | 0 | 8 | 5 | +3 | 8 | | — | — | 3–2 | — | 1–1 |
| 3 | (Sweden) Öster | 4 | 2 | 1 | 1 | 7 | 5 | +2 | 7 | | 0–0 | — | — | — | 3–1 |
| 4 | (England) Tottenham Hotspur | 4 | 1 | 0 | 3 | 3 | 13 | −10 | 3 | | — | 0–2 | 1–2 | — | — |
| 5 | (Slovenia) Rudar Velenje | 4 | 0 | 1 | 3 | 3 | 7 | −4 | 1 | | 0–1 | — | — | 1–2 | — |

Source: rsssf.com

=== Basel ===
==== Intertoto Cup ====
===== Group 1 =====
| 24 June 1995 Matchday 1 | Basel (Switzerland) | 1 – 0 | (England) Sheffield Wednesday | St. Jakob Stadium, Basel |
| 20:00 | Walker (yellow card) 14'; Rey 68' | Report | (yellow card) 14' Brien | Attendance: 5,200; Referee: Ladislav Gádoši (Austria) |

| 1 July 1995 Matchday 2 | Górnik Zabrze (Poland) | 1 – 2 | (Switzerland) Basel | Stadion Górnika, Zabrze |
| 17:00 | Brzoza 39' | Report | (yellow card) 24' Douimi; 27', 41' Zuffi; (yellow card) 84' | Attendance: 1,714; Referee: Ladislav Gádoši (Slovakia) |

| 8 July 1995 Matchday 3 | Basel (Switzerland) | 2 – 3 | (Germany) Karlsruhe | St. Jakob Stadium, Basel |
| 16:00 | Nyarko (yellow card) 33'; Zuffi 39' (pen.); Ceccaroni (yellow card) 53'; Gigon (yellow card) 71'; Rey 84' | Report | 13' Fink; (yellow card) 19' Reich; 31' (yellow card) 56' Nowotny; (yellow card) 37' Metz; (yellow card) 43' Kiriakov; (yellow card) 64' Schuster; 78' Schmitt | Attendance: 11,300; Referee: Gylfi Þór Orrason (Iceland) |

| 15 July 1995 Matchday 4 | Aarhus GF (Denmark) | 2 – 1 | (Switzerland) Basel | Aarhus Idrætspark, Aarhus |
| 17:00 | Jokovic 7'; Piechnik 35' | Report | 78' Yakin; (yellow card) 89' Tabakovic | Attendance: 1,600; Referee: Timo Keltanen (Finland) |

Final table

| Pos | Team | Pld | W | D | L | GF | GA | GD | Pts | Qualification | KAR | SHW | BAS | AAR | GÓR |
|---|---|---|---|---|---|---|---|---|---|---|---|---|---|---|---|
| 1 | (Germany) Karlsruhe | 4 | 3 | 1 | 0 | 13 | 4 | +9 | 10 | Advanced to round of 16 | — | 1–1 | — | 3–0 | — |
| 2 | (England) Sheffield Wednesday | 4 | 2 | 1 | 1 | 7 | 5 | +2 | 7 | | — | — | — | 3–1 | 3–2 |
| 3 | (Switzerland) Basel | 4 | 2 | 0 | 2 | 6 | 6 | 0 | 6 | | 2–3 | 1–0 | — | — | — |
| 4 | (Denmark) Aarhus GF | 4 | 2 | 0 | 2 | 7 | 8 | −1 | 6 | | — | — | 2–1 | — | 4–1 |
| 5 | (Poland) Górnik Zabrze | 4 | 0 | 0 | 4 | 5 | 15 | −10 | 0 | | 1–6 | — | 1–2 | — | — |

Source: rsssf.com

=== Vaduz ===
==== Cup Winners' Cup ====
===== Qualifying round =====
| 10 August 1995 First leg | Vaduz (Liechtenstein) | 0–5 | (Czech Republic) Hradec Králové | Sportpark Eschen-Mauren, Eschen |
| 18:00 | | Report | Černý 15'; Samec 32', 50', 59'; Ptáček 37' | Attendance: 1,170; Referee: Mateo Beušan (Croatia) |

| 24 August 1995 Second leg | Hradec Králové (Czech Republic) | 9–1 | (Liechtenstein) Vaduz | Všesportovní stadion, Hradec Králové |
| 16:30 | Samec 4', 10', 30', 54'; Urban 15', 77' (pen.); Vrábel 37'; Smarda 50' (pen.); Ptáček 64' | Report | Ritter 28' | Attendance: 3,558; Referee: Vladimir Pyanikh (Ukraine) |

Hradec Králové won 14–1 on aggregate.

== Sources ==
- Switzerland 1995–96 at RSSSF
- Cup finals at Fussball-Schweiz
- UEFA Intertoto Cup 1995 at RSSSF
- Josef Zindel (2018). FC Basel 1893. Die ersten 125 Jahre (in German). Basel: Friedrich Reinhardt Verlag. ISBN 978-3-7245-2305-5.

| Preceded by 1994–95 | Seasons in Swiss football | Succeeded by 1996–97 |
