= 1994–95 in Swiss football =

Football in Switzerland
- Season: 1994–95

Men's football
- Nationalliga A: Grasshopper Club
- Nationalliga B: Yverdon-Sport
- 1. Liga: Overall champions Chiasso; Group 1: Naters; Group 2: Münsingen; Group 3: SC Brühl; Group 4: Chiasso
- Swiss Cup: Grasshopper Club

Women's football
- Swiss Women's Super League: FFC Bern
- Swiss Cup: FFC Bern

The following is a summary of the 1994–95 season of competitive football in Switzerland. This was the final season in Switzerland in which two points were awarded for a win; from the next season onwards this was to be changed to three points.

== Nationalliga A ==
=== Qualification phase ===
Pos	Team	Pld	W	D	L	GF	GA	GD	Pts	Qualification
1	Grasshopper Club	22	13	5	4	36	21	+15	31	Advance to championship round halved points (rounded up) as bonus
2	Lugano	22	8	9	5	30	17	+13	25	Advance to championship round halved points (rounded up) as bonus
3	Aarau	22	8	9	5	34	22	+12	25	Advance to championship round halved points (rounded up) as bonus
4	Xamax	22	9	6	7	33	31	+2	24	Advance to championship round halved points (rounded up) as bonus
5	Lausanne-Sport	22	8	8	6	34	35	−1	24	Advance to championship round halved points (rounded up) as bonus
6	Sion	22	10	3	9	32	37	−5	23	Advance to championship round halved points (rounded up) as bonus
7	Basel	22	6	8	8	18	15	+3	20	Advance to championship round halved points (rounded up) as bonus
8	Luzern	22	7	6	9	22	31	−9	20	Advance to championship round halved points (rounded up) as bonus
9	Zürich	22	4	11	7	23	27	−4	19	Continue to promotion/relegation round
10	Servette	22	6	6	10	26	31	−5	18	Continue to promotion/relegation round
11	St. Gallen	22	4	10	8	20	28	−8	18	Continue to promotion/relegation round
12	Young Boys	22	6	5	11	24	37	−13	17	Continue to promotion/relegation round

Source: rsssf.com
Rules for classification: 1) Points; 2) Goal difference; 3) Goals scored; 4) Head-to-head points; 5) Away goals scored; 6) Draw.

=== Championship group ===
The first eight teams of the qualification phase competed in the Championship round. The teams took half of the points (rounded up to complete units) gained in the qualification as bonus with them.

Pos	Team	Pld	W	D	L	GF	GA	GD	BP	Pts	Qualification
1	Grasshopper Club	14	9	3	2	25	13	+12	16	37	Swiss champions, qualified for 1995–96 Champions League
2	Lugano	14	6	5	3	25	17	+8	13	30	qualified for 1995–96 UEFA Cup
3	Xamax	14	6	4	4	27	20	+7	12	28	qualified for 1995–96 UEFA Cup
4	Aarau	14	5	4	5	17	16	+1	13	27	entered 1995 UEFA Intertoto Cup
5	Luzern	14	5	5	4	14	18	−4	10	25	entered 1995 UEFA Intertoto Cup
6	Sion	14	5	2	7	24	25	−1	12	24	Swiss Cup winners, qualified for 1995–96 Cup Winners' Cup
7	Basel	14	7	0	7	20	19	+1	10	24	entered 1995 UEFA Intertoto Cup
8	Lausanne-Sport	14	1	1	12	11	35	−24	12	15	

Source: rsssf.com
Rules for classification: 1) points; 2) Position in the qualification.

== Nationalliga B ==
=== Qualification phase ===
Group West

Pos	Team	Pld	W	D	L	GF	GA	GD	Pts	Qualification
1	Yverdon-Sport	14	9	4	1	45	18	+27	22	Advance to promotion/relegation NLA/LNB round
2	Solothurn	14	7	2	5	18	15	+3	16	Advance to promotion/relegation NLA/LNB round
3	Étoile Carouge	14	6	4	4	20	24	−4	16	Continue to relegation round NLB/1. Liga halved points (rounded up) as bonus
4	Grenchen	14	4	7	3	25	26	−1	15	Continue to relegation round NLB/1. Liga halved points (rounded up) as bonus
5	Baden	14	5	4	5	21	24	−3	14	Continue to relegation round NLB/1. Liga halved points (rounded up) as bonus
6	Delémont	14	4	5	5	21	21	0	13	Continue to relegation round NLB/1. Liga halved points (rounded up) as bonus
7	Echallens	14	3	2	9	13	21	−8	8	Continue to relegation round NLB/1. Liga halved points (rounded up) as bonus
8	Chênois	14	3	2	9	14	28	−14	8	Continue to relegation round NLB/1. Liga halved points (rounded up) as bonus

Source: rsssf.com
Rules for classification: 1) Points; 2) Goal difference; 3) Goals scored; 4) Head-to-head points; 5) Away goals scored; 6) Draw.

Group East

Pos	Team	Pld	W	D	L	GF	GA	GD	Pts	Qualification
1	Kriens	14	8	4	2	22	9	+13	20	Advance to promotion/relegation NLA/LNB round
2	Winterthur	14	9	1	4	25	19	+6	19	Advance to promotion/relegation NLA/LNB round
3	Locarno	14	7	3	4	33	17	+16	17	Continue to relegation round NLB/1. Liga halved points (rounded up) as bonus
4	Bellinzona	14	7	2	5	22	16	+6	16	Continue to relegation round NLB/1. Liga halved points (rounded up) as bonus
5	Wil	14	5	5	4	21	13	+8	15	Continue to relegation round NLB/1. Liga halved points (rounded up) as bonus
6	FC Schaffhausen	14	6	3	5	23	22	+1	15	Continue to relegation round NLB/1. Liga halved points (rounded up) as bonus
7	Tuggen	14	2	1	11	10	31	−21	5	Continue to relegation round NLB/1. Liga halved points (rounded up) as bonus
8	Gossau	14	1	3	10	12	41	−29	5	Continue to relegation round NLB/1. Liga halved points (rounded up) as bonus

Source: rsssf.com
Rules for classification: 1) Points; 2) Goal difference; 3) Goals scored; 4) Head-to-head points; 5) Away goals scored; 6) Draw.

=== Play-off for NLB championship ===
Semi-finals

Team 1	Score	Team 2
Winterthur	1–3	Yverdon-Sport
Yverdon-Sport	1–1	Winterthur

Yverdon-Sport win 4–2 on aggregate and continue to the final.

Team 1	Score	Team 2
Solothurn	2–1	Kriens
Kriens	2–2 a.e.t.	Solothurn

Solothurn win 4–3 on aggregate and continue to the finals.

Third place

Team 1	Score	Team 2
Kriens	2–2	Winterthur
Winterthur	2–0	Kriens

Winterthur win 4–2 on aggregate and are declaired third.

Final

Team 1	Score	Team 2
Yverdon-Sport	0–0	Solothurn
Solothurn	1–2	Yverdon-Sport

Yverdon-Sport win 2–1 on aggregate and are declaired NLB champions. Solothurn are runners-up

=== Promotion/relegation group NLA/NLB ===
The teams in the ninth to twelfth positions in Nationalliga A competed with the top four teams of Nationalliga B in a Nationalliga A/B promotion/relegation round.

Pos	Team	Pld	W	D	L	GF	GA	GD	Pts	Qualification
1	BSC Young Boys	14	7	3	4	22	14	+8	17	Remain in 1995–96 Nationalliga A
2	FC St. Gallen	14	5	6	3	20	13	+7	16	Remain in 1995–96 Nationalliga A
3	FC Zürich	14	5	6	3	19	16	+3	16	Remain in 1995–96 Nationalliga A
4	Servette FC	14	5	6	3	15	13	+2	16	Remain in 1995–96 Nationalliga A
5	SC Kriens	14	4	7	3	18	14	+4	15	Remain in Nationalliga B
6	Yverdon-Sport FC	14	6	3	5	18	15	+3	15	Remain in Nationalliga B
7	FC Winterthur	14	3	7	4	13	13	0	13	Remain in Nationalliga B
8	FC Solothurn	14	0	4	10	4	31	−27	4	Remain in Nationalliga B

Source: rsssf.com
Rules for classification: 1) Points; 2) Goal difference; 3) Goals scored; 4) Head-to-head points; 5) Away goals scored; 6) Draw.

=== Relegation group NLB/1. Liga ===
The last six teams in each of the two qualification phase groups competed in the relegation group against relegation to the 1. Liga. The teams all entered the phase in one sole group. The teams took half of the points (rounded up to complete units) gained in the qualification as bonus with them. As the NLB was to be reduced to one single group the following season, six teams would be relegated to the 1995–96 Swiss 1. Liga.

Pos	Team	Pld	W	D	L	GF	GA	GD	BP	Pts	Qualification or relegation
1	FC Schaffhausen	22	8	12	2	35	17	+18	8	36	Remain in NLB
2	SR Delémont	22	12	5	5	38	21	+17	7	36	Remain in NLB
3	Wil	22	11	6	5	32	16	+16	8	36	Remain in NLB
4	AC Bellinzona	22	11	6	5	29	19	+10	8	36	Licence revoked, relegated to 1995–96 Swiss 1. Liga
5	FC Locarno	22	8	8	6	29	28	+1	9	33	Remain in NLB
6	FC Grenchen	22	9	7	6	25	25	0	8	33	Licence revoked, relegated to 1995–96 Swiss 1. Liga
7	FC Baden	22	8	8	6	34	27	+7	7	31	Remain in NLB, see note below
8	Étoile Carouge	22	8	4	10	37	33	+4	8	28	Remain in NLB, see note below
9	FC Gossau	22	7	7	8	32	36	−4	3	24	Relegated to 1995–96 Swiss 1. Liga
10	CS Chênois	22	4	9	9	22	35	−13	4	21	Relegated to 1995–96 Swiss 1. Liga
11	FC Echallens	22	4	4	14	13	37	−24	4	16	Relegated to 1995–96 Swiss 1. Liga
12	FC Tuggen	22	2	4	16	18	50	−32	3	11	Relegated to 1995–96 Swiss 1. Liga

Source: RSSSF
Rules for classification: 1) points; 2) Position in the qualification; 3) Goal difference; 4) Goals scored; 5) Head-to-head points; 6) Away goals scored; 7) Draw.

Note

Because AC Bellinzona and FC Grenchen had their licenses revoked, FC Baden and Étoile Carouge remained in the NLB.

== 1. Liga ==
=== Group 1 ===
Pos	Team	Pld	W	D	L	GF	GA	GD	Pts	Qualification or relegation
1	FC Naters	26	17	6	3	50	22	+28	40	Play-off to Nationalliga B
2	FC Bulle	26	17	5	4	64	25	+39	39	Decider winners, to play-off to Nationalliga B
3	FC Raron	26	16	7	3	56	25	+31	39	To decider
4	FC Renens	26	14	7	5	61	32	+29	35	
5	Vevey Sports	26	15	2	9	45	26	+19	32	
6	FC Martigny-Sports	26	10	7	9	40	47	−7	27	
7	FC Montreux-Sports	26	10	6	10	34	33	+1	26	
8	FC Stade Nyonnais	26	9	6	11	42	44	−2	24	
9	FC Stade Lausanne	26	9	4	13	37	53	−16	22	
10	FC Monthey	26	8	5	13	40	48	−8	21	
11	Grand-Lancy FC	26	8	4	14	32	37	−5	20	
12	Signal FC (Bernex)	26	6	5	15	29	42	−13	17	Decider winners, to play-out against relegation
13	FC Le Mont	26	6	5	15	38	76	−38	17	Decider losers, relegation to 2. Liga
14	Urania Genève Sport	26	1	3	22	24	82	−58	5	Relegation to 2. Liga

Source: RSSSF
Rules for classification: 1) Points; 2) Goal difference within the league, but play-off for qualifiers.

==== Deciders ====
The decider for second position, qualification to play-off, was played at a neutral ground. It took place on 23 May 1995 at the Stade d'Octodure in Martigny.

Team 1	Score	Team 2
Bulle	2–1	Raron

Bulle win and advance to play-offs. Raron remain in division

Decider for 12th/13th position, play-out or direct relegation, was played at a neutral ground. It took place on 23 May 1995 at the Stade de Colovray in Nyon.

Team 1	Score	Team 2
Signal FC (Bernex)	2–0	Le Mont

Signal FC (Bernex) win and advance to play-outs. Le Mont are directly relegated to 2. Liga.

=== Group 2 ===
Pos	Team	Pld	W	D	L	GF	GA	GD	Pts	Qualification or relegation
1	FC Münsingen	26	15	10	1	40	11	+29	40	Play-off to Nationalliga B
2	FC Thun	26	15	7	4	57	21	+36	37	Play-off to Nationalliga B
3	FC Fribourg	26	10	9	7	39	24	+15	29	
4	BSC Old Boys	26	12	5	9	35	34	+1	29	
5	FC Serrières	26	8	12	6	39	33	+6	28	
6	FC Biel-Bienne	26	10	7	9	46	37	+9	27	
7	FC Riehen	26	8	8	10	35	34	+1	24	
8	FC Le Locle	26	10	4	12	38	40	−2	24	
9	FC La Chaux-de-Fonds	26	7	10	9	29	44	−15	24	
10	FC Colombier	26	8	7	11	33	37	−4	23	
11	SV Lyss	26	8	7	11	35	41	−6	23	To decider
12	SC Bümpliz 78	26	9	5	12	29	44	−15	23	To decider
13	FC Moutier	26	9	4	13	28	38	−10	22	Relegation to 2. Liga
14	ASI Audax-Friul	26	2	7	17	15	60	−45	11	Relegation to 2. Liga

Source: RSSSF
Rules for classification: 1) Points; 2) Goal difference within the league, but play-off for qualifiers.

==== Decider ====
Decider for 11th/12th position. 12th position means advance to play-out against relegation. The decider was played at a neutral ground. It took place on 23 May 1995 at Stadion Gurzelen in Biel/Bienne.

Team 1	Score	Team 2
SV Lyss	2–1 (a.e.t.)	Bümpliz

SV Lyss win and remain in the division. Bümpliz advance to play-outs against relegation.

=== Group 3 ===
Pos	Team	Pld	W	D	L	GF	GA	GD	Pts	Qualification or relegation
1	SC Brühl	26	16	8	2	61	24	+37	40	Play-off to Nationalliga B
2	FC Altstetten	26	15	9	2	56	23	+33	39	Play-off to Nationalliga B
3	FC Frauenfeld	26	15	8	3	62	25	+37	38	
4	SC Young Fellows Juventus	26	14	5	7	46	30	+16	33	
5	FC Suhr	26	10	8	8	46	39	+7	28	
6	FC Red Star Zürich	26	10	7	9	40	31	+9	27	
7	FC Bülach	26	10	6	10	35	41	−6	26	
8	FC Klus-Balsthal	26	9	5	12	34	40	−6	23	
9	SV Schaffhausen	26	5	13	8	25	32	−7	23	
10	FC Kölliken	26	5	10	11	30	47	−17	20	
11	FC Muri	26	4	10	12	29	51	−22	18	
12	TSV St. Otmar St. Gallen	26	5	7	14	32	54	−22	17	Play-out against relegation
13	FC Wiedikon	26	5	6	15	27	50	−23	16	Relegation to 2. Liga
14	FC Pratteln	26	5	6	15	21	57	−36	16	Relegation to 2. Liga

Source: RSSSF
Rules for classification: 1) Points; 2) Goal difference within the league, but play-off for qualifiers.

=== Group 4 ===
Pos	Team	Pld	W	D	L	GF	GA	GD	Pts	Qualification or relegation
1	FC Chiasso	26	17	5	4	48	17	+31	39	Play-off to Nationalliga B
2	FC Freienbach	26	14	9	3	43	22	+21	37	Play-off to Nationalliga B
3	FC Ascona	26	15	6	5	48	21	+27	36	
4	FC Sursee	26	11	10	5	33	18	+15	32	
5	SC Buochs	26	11	8	7	44	36	+8	30	
6	Zug 94	26	12	5	9	39	32	+7	29	
7	FC Glarus	26	9	6	11	33	37	−4	24	
8	FC Mendrisio	26	8	7	11	23	27	−4	23	
9	FC Vaduz	26	7	8	11	33	41	−8	22	
10	FC Tresa-Monteggio	26	6	10	10	25	34	−9	22	
11	FC Emmenbrücke	26	7	8	11	27	39	−12	22	
12	FC Stäfa	26	4	10	12	21	37	−16	18	Play-out against relegation
13	FC Uznach	26	4	8	14	24	51	−27	16	Relegation to 2. Liga
14	FC Chur	26	5	4	17	20	49	−29	14	Relegation to 2. Liga

Source: RSSSF
Rules for classification: 1) Points; 2) Goal difference within the league, but play-off for qualifiers.

=== Promotion play-off ===
Qualification round

Team 1	Score	Team 2
Thun	1–1	Naters
Naters	2–0	Thun

Naters win 3–1 on aggregate and continue to the finals.

Team 1	Score	Team 2
Bulle	0–0	Münsingen
Münsingen	1–1	Bulle

1–1 on aggregate. Bulle win on away goals and continue to the finals.

Team 1	Score	Team 2
FC Altstetten	0–0	Chiasso
Chiasso	1–0	FC Altstetten

Chiasso win 1–0 on aggregate and continue to the finals.

Team 1	Score	Team 2
Freienbach	2–2	SC Brühl
SC Brühl	1–2	Freienbach

Freienbach win 4–3 on aggregate and continue to the finals.

Final round

Team 1	Score	Team 2
Naters	4–2	Bulle
Bulle	2–2	Naters

Naters win 6–2 on aggregate and are promoted to Nationalliga B.

Team 1	Score	Team 2
Chiasso	2–0	Freienbach
Freienbach	2–3	Chiasso

Chiasso win 5–2 on aggregate and are promoted to Nationalliga B.

=== Relegation play-outs ===
Team 1	Score	Team 2
TSV St. Otmar St. Gallen	0–0	FC Stäfa
FC Stäfa	2–0	TSV St. Otmar St. Gallen

FC Stäfa win on 2–0 on aggregate. TSV St. Otmar St. Gallen are relegated to 2. Liga.

Team 1	Score	Team 2
Signal FC (Bernex)	2–3	Bümpliz
Bümpliz	4–1	Signal FC (Bernex)

Bümpliz win on 7–3 on aggregate. Signal FC (Bernex) are relegated to 2. Liga.

== Swiss Cup ==
The route of the finalists to the final. Clubs playing in the European competitions were granted a bye in the third round:

- Round 3: Sion bye. GC bye.
- Round 4: FC Renens-Sion 1–3 (a.e.t.). FC Sursee-GC 0–2.
- Round 5: FC Freienbach-Sion 0–9. GC-FC Lugano 1–0.
- Quarter-finals: AC Bellinzona-Sion 0–1. FC Wil-GC 0–2.
- Semi-finals: Sion-SR Delémont 6–1. BSC Young Boys-GC 1–2 (a.e.t.).

The winners of the first drawn semi-final is considered as home team in the final.

=== Final ===
5 June 1995
15:00

FC Sion	4 – 2	Grasshoppers
Ouattara 5'; Assis 40' (pen.); Bonvin 68'; Orlando (red card) 78'; Ouattara 84'	Report	52' Vega; 70' Willems

Wankdorf, Bern
Attendance: 35,000
Referee: (Switzerland) Werner Müller (Obererlinsbach)

== Swiss Clubs in Europe ==
- Servette as 1993–94 Nationalliga A champions: 1994–95 UEFA Champions League qualifying round and 1994 Intertoto Cup
- Sion as league third placed team: 1994–95 UEFA Cup first round and 1994 Intertoto Cup
- Aarau as league fourth placed team: 1994–95 UEFA Cup preliminary round
- Grasshopper Club as 1993–94 Swiss Cup winners: 1994–95 UEFA Cup Winners' Cup and 1994 Intertoto Cup
- Young Boys: 1994 Intertoto Cup
- Lausanne-Sport: 1994 Intertoto Cup
- Schaan as 1993–94 Liechtenstein Cup winners: 1994–95 UEFA Cup Winners' Cup qualifying round

=== Servette ===
==== Champions League ====
===== Qualifying round =====
10 August 1994 First leg	Steaua București (Romania)	4–1	(Switzerland) Servette	Stadionul Steaua, Bucharest
20:30	Ilie 1'; Stan 16' (pen.); Pârvu 25'; Lăcătuș 49'	Report	Sinval 71'	Attendance: 8,000; Referee: Vassilios Nikakis (Greece)

24 August 1994 Second leg	Servette (Switzerland)	1–1	(Romania) Steaua București	Stade des Charmilles, Geneva
20:15	Schepull 13'	Report	Pârvu 51'	Attendance: 5,800; Referee: Markus Merk (Germany)

Steaua București won 5–2 on aggregate.

==== Intertoto Cup ====
===== Group 6 =====
Pos	Team	Pld	W	D	L	GF	GA	GD	Pts
1	(Slovakia) Slovan Bratislava	4	2	1	1	9	5	+4	5
2	(Czech Republic) Slavia Prague	4	2	1	1	9	6	+3	5
3	(Switzerland) Servette	4	2	0	2	5	8	−3	4
4	(Denmark) Brøndby IF	4	1	1	2	7	9	−2	3
5	(Austria) Admira Wacker	4	1	1	2	3	5	−2	3

=== Sion ===
==== UEFA Cup ====
===== First round =====
13 September 1994 First leg	Apollon Limassol (Cyprus)	1–3	(Switzerland) Sion	Tsirio Stadium, Limassol
19:15	Krčmarević 35'	Report	Bonvin 71'; Marin 82', 86'	Attendance: 8,000; Referee: Gheorghe Constantin (Romania)

27 September 1994 Second leg	Sion (Switzerland)	2–3 (a.e.t.)	(Cyprus) Apollon Limassol	Stade de Tourbillon, Sion
20:15	Marin 90'; Orlando 103'	Report	Krčmarević 48'; Špoljarić 67'; Šćepović 77'	Attendance: 8,000; Referee: Vítor Melo Pereira (Portugal)

Sion won 5–4 on aggregate.

===== Second round =====
18 October 1994 First leg	Sion (Switzerland)	2–0	(France) Marseille	Stade de Tourbillon, Sion
29:45	Wicky 24'; Kunz 43'	Report		Attendance: 15,700; Referee: Jorge Coroado (Portugal)

1 November 1994 Second leg	Marseille (France)	3–1	(Switzerland) Sion	Stade Vélodrome, Marseille
20:45	Libbra 47', 65'; Ferreri 73'	Report	Kunz 5'	Attendance: 40,000; Referee: László Vágner (Hungary)

3–3 on aggregate. Sion won on away goals.

===== Third round =====
24 November 1994 First leg	Nantes (France)	4–0	(Switzerland) Sion	Stade de la Beaujoire, Nantes
20:30	Loko 15'; Ferri 33'; N'Doram 54'; Makélélé 82'	Report		Attendance: 34,210; Referee: Dermot Gallagher (England)

8 December 1994 Second leg	Sion (Switzerland)	2–2	(France) Nantes	Stade de Tourbillon, Sion
20:30	Herr 76'; Marin 82'	Report	Loko 30'; N'Doram 31'	Attendance: 12,000; Referee: Hellmut Krug (Germany)

Nantes won 6–2 on aggregate.

==== Intertoto Cup ====
===== Group 5 =====
Pos	Team	Pld	W	D	L	GF	GA	GD	Pts
1	(Hungary) Békéscsaba	4	3	0	1	14	7	+7	6
2	(Denmark) OB	4	2	0	2	11	6	+5	4
3	(Austria) Rapid Wien	4	2	0	2	4	6	−2	4
4	(Germany) Dynamo Dresden	4	1	1	2	6	6	0	3
5	(Switzerland) Sion	4	1	1	2	6	16	−10	3

=== Aarau ===
==== UEFA Cup ====
===== Preliminary round =====
9 August 1994 First leg	Aarau (Switzerland)	1–0	(Slovenia) Mura	Stadion Brügglifeld, Aarau
20:00	Kucharski 71'	Report		Attendance: 4,800; Referee: José Pratas (Portugal)

23 August 1994 Second leg	Mura (Slovenia)	0–1	(Switzerland) Aarau	Mestni stadion Fazanerija, Murska Sobota
17:30		Report	Skrzypczak 17'	Attendance: 4,500; Referee: Géza Kiss (Hungary)

Aarau won 2–0 on aggregate.

===== First round =====
13 September 1994 First leg	Aarau (Switzerland)	0–0	(Portugal) Marítimo	Stadion Brügglifeld, Aarau
20:00		Report		Attendance: 5,400; Referee: Karol Ihring (Slovakia)

27 September 1994 Second leg	Marítimo (Portugal)	1–0	(Switzerland) Aarau	Estádio dos Barreiros, Funchal
19:00	Paulo Alves 62'	Report		Attendance: 9,000; Referee: John Blankenstein (Netherlands)

Marítimo won 1–0 on aggregate.

=== Grasshopper Club ===
==== Cup Winners' Cup ====
===== First round =====
15 September 1994 First leg	Grasshopper (Switzerland)	3–0	(Ukraine) Chornomorets Odesa	Hardturm, Zürich
20:00	Bickel 41'; Koller 52'; Subiat 85'	Report		Attendance: 3,600; Referee: Jiří Ulrich (Czech Republic)

29 September 1994 Second leg	Chornomorets Odesa (Ukraine)	1–0	(Switzerland) Grasshopper	Central Stadium Chornomorets, Odesa
19:00	Huseynov 10'	Report		Attendance: 5,913; Referee: Hermann Albrecht (Germany)

Grasshopper won 3–1 on aggregate.

===== Second round =====
20 October 1994 First leg	Sampdoria (Italy)	3–0	(Switzerland) Grasshopper	Stadio Luigi Ferraris, Genoa
20:30	Melli 45'; Mihajlović 76'; Maspero 83'	Report		Attendance: 25,316; Referee: Ryszard Wójcik (Poland)

3 November 1994 Second leg	Grasshopper (Switzerland)	3–2	(Italy) Sampdoria	Hardturm, Zürich
20:30	Willems 13'; Bickel 52'; Koller 55'	Report	Melli 17'; Lombardo 40'	Attendance: 12,100; Referee: John Blankenstein (Netherlands)

Sampdoria won 5–3 on aggregate.

==== Intertoto Cup ====
===== Group 7 =====
Pos	Team	Pld	W	D	L	GF	GA	GD	Pts
1	(Switzerland) Grasshopper Club	4	3	0	1	9	2	+7	6
2	(Sweden) Trelleborgs FF	4	3	0	1	8	4	+4	6
3	(Denmark) Aalborg	4	2	0	2	6	9	−3	4
4	(Germany) MSV Duisburg	4	1	0	3	4	8	−4	2
5	(Slovakia) Dunajská Streda	4	1	0	3	3	7	−4	2

=== Young Boys ===
==== Intertoto Cup ====
===== Group 2 =====
Pos	Team	Pld	W	D	L	GF	GA	GD	Pts
1	(Switzerland) Young Boys	4	3	0	1	6	2	+4	6
2	(Israel) Hapoel Be'er Sheva	4	2	1	1	9	5	+4	5
3	(Romania) Electroputere Craiova	4	2	1	1	6	3	+3	5
4	(Germany) Karlsruhe	4	1	1	2	2	4	−2	3
5	(Sweden) Häcken	4	0	1	3	3	12	−9	1

=== Lausanne-Sport ===
==== Intertoto Cup ====
===== Group 3 =====
9 July 1994 Matchday 1	Sparta Rotterdam (Netherlands)	3–1	(Switzerland) Lausanne-Sport	Rotterdam
	Winston Bogarde 40', 60'; Jos van Eck 55'		Francesco Di Jorio 55'	Stadium: Het Kasteel; Attendance: 500

Pos	Team	Pld	W	D	L	GF	GA	GD	Pts
1	(Sweden) AIK	4	3	1	0	9	5	+4	7
2	(Germany) Bayer Leverkusen	4	2	0	2	8	6	+2	4
3	(Netherlands) Sparta Rotterdam	3	1	1	1	6	6	0	3
4	(Switzerland) Lausanne-Sport	4	1	1	2	3	5	−2	3
5	(Austria) Tirol Innsbruck	3	0	1	2	1	5	−4	1

=== Schaan ===
==== Cup Winners' Cup ====
===== Qualifying round =====
11 August 1994 First leg	Pirin Blagoevgrad (Bulgaria)	3–0	(Liechtenstein) Schaan	Vasil Levski National Stadium, Sofia
18:00	Orachev 18'; Yanev 29'; Petrov 59'	Report		Attendance: 1,744; Referee: Andreas Georgiou (Cyprus)

24 August 1994 Second leg	Schaan (Liechtenstein)	0–1	(Bulgaria) Pirin Blagoevgrad	Sportanlage Rheinwiese, Schaan
18:00		Report	Yanev 2'	Attendance: 1,150; Referee: Štefan Tivold (Slovenia)

Pirin Blagoevgrad won 4–0 on aggregate.

== Sources ==
- Switzerland 1994–95 at RSSSF
- Cup finals at Fussball-Schweiz
- Intertoto-history, 1994 by Pawel Mogielnicki
- Josef Zindel (2018). FC Basel 1893. Die ersten 125 Jahre (in German). Basel: Friedrich Reinhardt Verlag. ISBN 978-3-7245-2305-5.

Preceded by 1993–94	Seasons in Swiss football	Succeeded by 1995–96
