= Ramon Vega =

Swiss footballer (born 1971)

Personal information
- Full name: Ramon Vega
- Date of birth: 14 June 1971 (age 55)
- Place of birth: Olten, Switzerland
- Height: 1.90 m (6 ft 3 in)
- Position: Centre back

Youth career
- FC Olten

Senior career*
Years	Team	Apps	(Gls)
1990–1996	Grasshoppers	169	(13)
1996–1997	Cagliari	14	(0)
1997–2001	Tottenham Hotspur	64	(7)
2000–2001	→ Celtic (loan)	18	(2)
2001–2002	Watford	27	(1)
2002–2003	Créteil	23	(4)
Total		315	(27)

International career
1993–2001	Switzerland	23	(1)
- * Club domestic league appearances and goals

Ramon Vega (Spanish pronunciation: [raˈmon ˈβeɣa]; Swiss Standard German pronunciation: [ˈraː.mon ˈveː.ga]; born 14 June 1971) is a Swiss retired footballer, who played as a central defender.

During his 13-year professional career he played for Grasshoppers, Cagliari, Tottenham Hotspur, Celtic, Watford and Créteil. Vega also played 23 times for Switzerland, appearing in the UEFA Euro 1996 tournament.

== Early life ==
Vega was one of five children to Spanish immigrants. He was born in Olten near Zürich, with the remaining siblings already born in his parents' native city of Madrid.

Vega attended school in Trimbach and went on to study for a degree in banking and financing, at the Zürich Business School.

== Club career ==
Vega began his professional career in with local Grasshopper Club Zürich in 1989, being a defensive mainstay from his second season onwards. He was essential in two of the three leagues he actually conquered, playing in 67 games combined and scoring seven goals.

In the 1996 summer Vega moved to Italy with Cagliari Calcio, in the Serie A. However, after only seven months, he signed with England's Tottenham Hotspur, for a transfer fee of £3.75 million. He was used mostly as a backup with his new side, helping it win the Football League Cup in 1999; in the final, a 1–0 win over Leicester City, he broke his ankle, and could never regain his previous form with Spurs.

In mid-December 2000, Vega moved on loan to Celtic – in the previous off-season, he rejected a move to the club– where he played a significant part in the winning of three trophies, in a short six-month spell. In his debut, on the 17th, he netted twice in the home demolition of Aberdeen (6–0); he also scored a brace against Dunfermline in the Scottish Cup.

Released by Tottenham in June 2001, after also having refused the Scottish club's offer of an additional year, Vega moved back to England with Watford, penning a three-year deal with the Championship outfit. One of the side's best-paid players under manager Gianluca Vialli, he was released after just one season, as the club underachieved for a final 14th position; for the Hornets he netted three times, once in the league against Norwich City and twice in the League Cup, against Bristol City and Bradford City.

Vega retired in 2004 aged 33, after one season with lowly US Créteil-Lusitanos in France.

== International career ==
Vega first played for Switzerland in 1993, but was overlooked for the 1994 FIFA World Cup in the United States.

Two years later, he was picked – and started – for the squad at UEFA Euro 1996 in England, helping them to a 1–1 draw against the hosts. His career brought him a total of 23 caps, and he also captained the side on occasion, scoring in the 1–1 friendly match with England – who were preparing for the 1998 World Cup – in Bern.

== Personal life ==
After his retirement, in 2012 he became a founding member of the Duet Group, a financial group specializing in asset management and private equity. In 2006 Vega also founded the Matterhorn Capital Rosalp, a Swiss real estate company focusing on the development of luxury hotels worldwide, opening the first facilities in Verbier, Switzerland. He also opened "Ramon Vega's Soccer School" in Marbella, Spain.

Vega owned a stake in a Romford jewellery shop, Ministry of Gold.

In February 2009, Vega unsuccessfully bid to purchase Premier League team and FA Cup holders Portsmouth from its owner Alexandre Gaydamak; however, he was consistently not able to demonstrate an ability to secure financing for his proposal.

In October 2015 he announced that he was considering standing as a candidate in the FIFA presidential election but ultimately did not stand. 11 years later, he announced his candidacy in the 2027 election against incumbent Gianni Infantino.

== Career statistics ==
As of January 2004

Appearances and goals by club, season and competition
Club	Season	League			Cup¹		League Cup²		Total	
Club	Season	Division	Apps.	Goals	Apps.	Goals	Apps.	Goals	Apps.	Goals
Cagliari	1996–97	Serie A	14	0	0	0	0	0	14	0
Tottenham Hotspur	1996–97	Premier League	8	1	0	0	0	0	8	1
Tottenham Hotspur	1997–98	Premier League	25	3	3	0	2	0	30	3
Tottenham Hotspur	1998–99	Premier League	16	2	4	0	5	1	25	3
Tottenham Hotspur	1999-2000	Premier League	5	1	2	0	1	0	8	1
Tottenham Hotspur	2000–01	Premier League	10	0	0	0	3	0	13	0
Celtic (loan)	2000–01	Scottish Premier League	18	2	6	2	2	0	26	4
Watford	2001–02	First Division	27	1	1	0	5	2	33	3
Créteil	2002–03	Ligue 2	23	4	0	0	0	0	23	4
Career total			146	14	16	2	18	3	180	19

¹ include Coppa Italia, FA Cup, Scottish Cup, and Coupe de France .

² include Football League Cup, Scottish League Cup, and Coupe de la Ligue.

== Honours ==
Grasshoppers

- Swiss Super League: 1990–91, 1994–95, 1995–96
- Swiss Cup: 1993–94

Tottenham Hotspur

- Football League Cup: 1998–99

Celtic

- Scottish Premier League: 2000–01
- Scottish Cup: 2000–01
- Scottish League Cup: 2000–01
