= Mats Gren =

Swedish football manager and player

Personal information
- Full name: Mats Åke Gren
- Date of birth: 20 December 1963 (age 62)
- Place of birth: Falun, Sweden
- Height: 1.86 m (6 ft 1 in)
- Position: Central defender

Senior career*
Years	Team	Apps	(Gls)
1978–1983	Falu BS	45	(12)
1984–1985	IFK Göteborg	40	(9)
1985–2000	Grasshopper	427	(45)
Total		512	(66)

International career
1984–1990	Sweden U21	12	(5)
1984–1992	Sweden	22	(0)

Managerial career
- 2004: Grasshopper (assistant)
- 2005–2006: FC Vaduz
- 2007–2009: Grasshopper (assistant)
- 2009–2011: Vejle
- 2012–2014: Jönköpings Södra IF
- 2020–2021: BK Häcken (women)
- * Club domestic league appearances and goals

Mats Åke Gren (born 20 December 1963) is a Swedish football coach and former player who played as a defender. He played for IFK Göteborg and Grasshopper during a professional career that spanned between 1978 and 2000. A full international between 1984 and 1992, he won 22 caps for the Sweden national team and represented his country at the 1990 FIFA World Cup. Gren was first playing as a forward, but as he was a utility player, the last ten years in Grasshopper he played as a defender and also became team captain.

== Club career ==
Gren played for Falu BS 1982–1984. He then played for IFK Göteborg in 1984–1985 and became Swedish champion in 1984. Gren then moved to Grasshopper, where he played from 1985 to 2000. He won the Swiss National League five times (1990, 1991, 1995, 1996, 1998) and won four Swiss Cup titles (1988, 1989, 1990, 1994).

== International career ==
Gren played 22 games for the Sweden national team and was on the squad in the 1990 FIFA World Cup, in one match as a substitute.

== Coaching career ==
He was assistant manager of Grasshopper from 2009.

On 31 May 2009 he was named as the new head coach of Vejle Boldklub and signed over three years here between 30 June 2012.

Due to a poor start to the spring season of 2011, where Vejle dropped from 2nd to 3rd in the Danish 1st Division, Gren was sacked by the club board on 12 April 2011.

In 2014, Gren left his job as manager Jönköpings Södra to take the role as sporting director at IFK Göteborg. On 10 October 2018, with the club showing poor results and having financial difficulties, IFK Göteborg sacked Gren.

== Career statistics ==
=== International ===
Appearances and goals by national team and year
National team	Year	Apps	Goals
Sweden	1984	3	0
Sweden	1985	2	0
Sweden	1986	0	0
Sweden	1987	1	0
Sweden	1988	1	0
Sweden	1989	3	0
Sweden	1990	3	0
Sweden	1991	6	0
Sweden	1992	3	0
Total		22	0

== Honours ==
=== Player ===
IFK Göteborg

- Swedish Champion: 1984

Grasshopper

- Swiss National League: 1989–90, 1990–91, 1994–95, 1995–96, 1997–98
- Swiss Cup: 1987–88, 1988–89, 1989–90, 1993–94

=== Manager ===
BK Häcken

- Damallsvenskan: 2020
