= Mirandinha (footballer, born 1970) =

Brazilian footballer

Personal information
- Full name: Isaílton Ferreira da Silva
- Date of birth: 13 November 1970 (age 55)
- Place of birth: Palmares, Brazil
- Height: 1.73 m (5 ft 8 in)
- Position: Winger

Youth career
- –1989: Sport Recife

Senior career*
Years	Team	Apps	(Gls)
1989–1992	Sport Recife		
1991	→ Central (loan)		
1992	→ Noroeste (loan)		
1993	→ Ceará (loan)		
1994	Paysandu		
1995	Paraná		
1995–1996	Sion		
1996–1999	Corinthians	137	(47)
1999–2000	Juventude		
2001	América Mineiro		

Managerial career
- 2011: Araripina
- * Club domestic league appearances and goals as of 25 October 2023

Isaílton Ferreira da Silva (born 13 November 1970), better known as Mirandinha, is a Brazilian former professional footballer who played as a winger.

== Career ==
Mirandinha began his career at Sport, being part of the champion squad of the 1990 Campeonato Brasileiro Série B. He played for several other clubs until he was traded to FC Sion, where he remained for one season. In October 1996, he was hired by Corinthians, where he made history by becoming Brazilian champion twice. He stood out for his great speed and dribbling ability.

In 2011, Mirandinha was coach of Araripina.

== Honours ==
Sport

- Campeonato Brasileiro Série B: 1990
- Campeonato Pernambucano: 1991

Sion

- Swiss Cup: 1995–96

Corinthians

- Campeonato Paulista: 1997, 1999
- Campeonato Brasileiro: 1998, 1999
