= Adrian Kunz =

Swiss footballer and manager (born 1967)

Personal information
- Date of birth: 7 July 1967 (age 59)
- Height: 1.77 m (5 ft 10 in)
- Position: Forward

Senior career*
| Years | Team | Apps | (Gls) |
| 1987–1989 | Neuchâtel Xamax | 14 | (0) |
| 1989–1991 | FC Bulle | 74 | (34) |
| 1991–1994 | Young Boys | 100 | (31) |
| 1994–1995 | Sion | 32 | (9) |
| 1995–1998 | Neuchâtel Xamax | 90 | (40) |
| 1997–1999 | Werder Bremen | 16 | (1) |
| 1999 | FC Zürich | 10 | (3) |
| 1999–2000 | FC Aarau | 12 | (0) |
| 2000–2002 | SC Düdingen | | |
| 2004 | FC Langenthal | 1 | (0) |

International career
| 1992–1998 | Switzerland | 13 | (2) |

Managerial career
- 2003–2004: FC Langenthal
- 2006: Thun
- 2007–2008: SC Düdingen
- 2008–2009: Fribourg
- 2009–2010: FC Breitenrain
- 2011–2012: FC Wohlen
- * Club domestic league appearances and goals

Adrian Kunz (born 7 July 1967) is a Swiss former footballer and an ex-manager of several Swiss clubs, most recently Swiss Challenge League side FC Wohlen in 2011–12. Kunz played as a forward in a playing career that included spells at domestic clubs such as BSC Young Boys, FC Sion and FC Aarau, as well as two seasons at German side Werder Bremen.

== Club career ==
Kunz started his career with Neuchâtel Xamax in the 1987–88 season. He made nine appearances in his first season as Xamax finished as league champions of the Nationalliga A, the country's top division. The following season, Kunz played five league games for Xamax and also made his debut in Europe, coming on as a late substitute for Philippe Perret in Xamax's 5–0 second-leg defeat to Turkish giants Galatasaray on 9 November 1988 in the second round of the competition, a defeat that meant Xamax were eliminated on aggregate.

Kunz left for FC Bulle of the Nationalliga B midway through the season, and scored five times in thirteen games for his new club, with Bulle finishing fifth in the league. The 1989–90 season saw greater success for both player and club; Bulle finished as runners-up of the Nationalliga B West but ended up missing out on promotion by five points, while Kunz scored 15 goals in 32 league appearances, making him the joint-third top scorer in Bulle's promotion group. Kunz also netted 15 times in the following season, but did so in three fewer league games as Bulle slipped to eighth in the Nationalliga B, narrowly avoiding relegation to the third tier. Scoring six times in just ten games, Kunz was the second-top scorer in Bulle's relegation group, beaten only by teammate Andre Magnin.

With Bulle in decline, Kunz joined top-flight side BSC Young Boys ahead of the 1991–92 campaign. Ironically, Kunz found playing time easier to come by at his new, more successful club, playing all but three of 36 league games as the club finished in fourth place. The forward also scored twelve league goals – almost a quarter of Young Boys' collective tally for the season. Although Young Boys enjoyed more success in the 1992–93 season, finishing as league runners-up, Kunz only managed to score six goals in 32 appearances.

However, Kunz recovered to score 13 league goals for the club in the 1993–94 campaign, ending the season as the Swiss top-flight's joint-fifth top-scorer and recording the league's joint-third highest assist count in the first stage of the season. With Young Boys slipping to a disappointing sixth-placed finish, Kunz transferred to third-placed FC Sion in time for the 1994–95 season.

He played for Werder Bremen between 1997 and 1999, winning the 1998 UEFA Intertoto Cup.

== Honours ==
Neuchâtel Xamax

- Swiss Super League: 1987–88
- Swiss Super Cup: 1987

FC Sion

- Swiss Cup: 1994–95

Werder Bremen

- UEFA Intertoto Cup: 1998
