= Jean-Philippe Karlen =

Swiss footballer (born 1972)

Personal information
- Date of birth: 26 September 1972
- Place of birth: Switzerland
- Position(s): Defender, Midfielder, Forward

Senior career*
Years	Team	Apps	(Gls)
–1992	FC Lausanne-Sport	6	(0)
1992–1994	Yverdon-Sport FC	40+	(1+)
1994–1995	SC Kriens	10	(1)
1995–1999	Servette FC	97	(3)
1999–2002	FC Lausanne-Sport	83	(3)
2002–2003	SR Delémont	18	(0)
2003	Chongqing Dangdai Lifan F.C.		
2003–2004	Yverdon-Sport FC		
2003/04-2005	FC Lausanne-Sport		
- *Club domestic league appearances and goals

Jean-Philippe Karlen (born 26 September 1972) is a Swiss retired footballer.
