= Christophe Bonvin =

Swiss footballer (born 1965)

Personal information
- Date of birth: 14 July 1965 (age 61)
- Place of birth: Sion, Switzerland
- Height: 1.86 m (6 ft 1 in)
- Position: Striker

Senior career*
Years	Team	Apps	(Gls)
1982–1988	Sion		
1988–1990	Servette		
1990–1993	Neuchâtel Xamax		
1993–1997	Sion		

International career
1987–1996	Switzerland	45	(8)
- * Club domestic league appearances and goals

Christophe Bonvin (born 14 July 1965) is a former Swiss footballer who played as a midfielder.

He mostly played for FC Sion, but also for Servette and Neuchâtel Xamax. For Switzerland national football team he got 45 international caps, scored 8 goals and was in roster for Euro 1996.

== Honours ==
=== Player ===
FC Sion

- Swiss Championship: 1996–97
- Swiss Cup: 1985–86, 1994–95, 1995–96, 1996–97

Neuchâtel Xamax

- Swiss Super Cup: 1990
