= 1994–95 Nationalliga A =

Swiss football season

Nationalliga A
- Season: 1994–95
- Champions: Grasshopper Club
- Relegated: none
- Top goalscorer: Petar Aleksandrov Xamax (27 goals)

Nationalliga B
- Season: 1995–96
- Champions: Yverdon-Sport
- Promoted: none
- Relegated: Bellinzona; Grenchen; Gossau; Chênois; Echallens; Tuggen

Statistics of the Swiss National League in the 1994–95 football season. This was the final season in which two points were awarded for a win; going forward this changed to three points.

== Overview ==
The 28 teams of the Swiss Football League (Nationalliga) were divided into two divisions. There were 12 teams who played in the Nationalliga A (NLA), the top-tier. There were 16 teams in the Nationalliga B (NLB), the second tier, these were divided into two groups, a West group and an East group. Each team in each group played a double round-robin in the qualification phase. Thereafter the divisions were divided into a Swiss championship group, a NLA/NLB promotion/relegation group, each group with eight teams, and a relegation group NLB/1. Liga, here with the remaining 12 teams. Because the format in the following NLB season would be reduced from two groups to just one group of only 12 teams, there were two be six relegations from the NLB to the 1. Liga (third tier).

== Nationalliga A ==
=== Qualification phase ===
The qualification of the NLA began on 27 July 1994 and was completed on 4 December. The top eight teams in the qualification phase would advance to the championship group and the last four teams would play against relegation.

==== Table ====
Pos	Team	Pld	W	D	L	GF	GA	GD	Pts	Qualification
1	Grasshopper Club	22	13	5	4	36	21	+15	31	Advance to championship round halved points (rounded up) as bonus
2	Lugano	22	8	9	5	30	17	+13	25	Advance to championship round halved points (rounded up) as bonus
3	Aarau	22	8	9	5	34	22	+12	25	Advance to championship round halved points (rounded up) as bonus
4	Xamax	22	9	6	7	33	31	+2	24	Advance to championship round halved points (rounded up) as bonus
5	Lausanne-Sport	22	8	8	6	34	35	−1	24	Advance to championship round halved points (rounded up) as bonus
6	Sion	22	10	3	9	32	37	−5	23	Advance to championship round halved points (rounded up) as bonus
7	Basel	22	6	8	8	18	15	+3	20	Advance to championship round halved points (rounded up) as bonus
8	Luzern	22	7	6	9	22	31	−9	20	Advance to championship round halved points (rounded up) as bonus
9	Zürich	22	4	11	7	23	27	−4	19	Continue to promotion/relegation round
10	Servette	22	6	6	10	26	31	−5	18	Continue to promotion/relegation round
11	St. Gallen	22	4	10	8	20	28	−8	18	Continue to promotion/relegation round
12	Young Boys	22	6	5	11	24	37	−13	17	Continue to promotion/relegation round

Source: rsssf.com
Rules for classification: 1) Points; 2) Goal difference; 3) Goals scored; 4) Head-to-head points; 5) Away goals scored; 6) Draw.

==== Results ====
Home \ Away	AAR	BAS	GCZ	LS	LUG	LUZ	NX	SER	SIO	STG	YB	ZÜR
Aarau		0–0	5–1	1–1	0–0	2–1	2–2	3–0	3–0	3–0	2–0	3–0
Basel	0–2		0–2	2–1	0–1	4–0	0–0	2–1	1–2	0–0	0–1	0–0
Grasshopper	1–0	0–3		1–1	1–0	6–1	4–0	1–0	2–0	2–1	2–1	2–1
Lausanne-Sport	2–2	2–1	0–0		4–2	1–2	1–4	3–1	3–2	3–0	4–2	0–0
Lugano	1–1	1–1	1–0	2–3		2–0	1–1	0–1	3–0	0–0	4–0	2–2
Luzern	1–0	0–1	1–1	0–0	0–2		0–1	2–1	3–2	3–0	0–0	2–1
Neuchâtel Xamax	1–1	1–0	0–2	3–0	1–1	1–1		4–2	4–2	3–0	4–0	0–1
Servette	2–2	0–0	3–1	0–0	0–0	1–0	1–2		1–1	1–0	4–0	2–0
Sion	2–0	0–0	1–2	4–2	0–3	2–0	2–1	3–2		1–1	2–0	2–1
St. Gallen	2–2	0–3	1–1	4–0	1–0	0–0	4–0	2–1	0–1		1–1	1–1
Young Boys	1–0	1–0	1–1	1–2	0–3	1–3	4–0	4–1	1–3	1–1		4–0
Zürich	4–0	0–0	0–3	1–1	1–1	2–2	2–0	1–1	4–0	1–1	0–0	

Source: rsssf.com
Legend: Blue = home team win; Yellow = draw; Red = away team win.

=== Championship group ===
The first eight teams of the qualification phase competed in the Championship round. The teams took half of the points (rounded up to complete units) gained in the qualification as bonus with them. The championship group began on 26 February 1995 and was completed on 13 June.

==== Table ====
Pos	Team	Pld	W	D	L	GF	GA	GD	BP	Pts	Qualification
1	Grasshopper Club	14	9	3	2	25	13	+12	16	37	Swiss champions, qualified for 1995–96 Champions League
2	Lugano	14	6	5	3	25	17	+8	13	30	qualified for 1995–96 UEFA Cup
3	Xamax	14	6	4	4	27	20	+7	12	28	qualified for 1995–96 UEFA Cup
4	Aarau	14	5	4	5	17	16	+1	13	27	entered 1995 UEFA Intertoto Cup
5	Luzern	14	5	5	4	14	18	−4	10	25	entered 1995 UEFA Intertoto Cup
6	Sion	14	5	2	7	24	25	−1	12	24	Swiss Cup winners, qualified for 1995–96 Cup Winners' Cup
7	Basel	14	7	0	7	20	19	+1	10	24	entered 1995 UEFA Intertoto Cup
8	Lausanne-Sport	14	1	1	12	11	35	−24	12	15	

Source: rsssf.com
Rules for classification: 1) points; 2) Position in the qualification.

==== Results ====
Home \ Away	AAR	BAS	GCZ	LS	LUG	LUZ	NX	SIO
Aarau		0–1	2–2	4–1	3–3	3–0	1–1	2–1
Basel	0–1		1–0	5–0	1–2	2–0	1–2	3–1
Grasshopper	1–0	1–0		4–1	0–4	4–1	2–0	3–0
Lausanne-Sport	0–1	0–1	1–3		0–1	0–1	2–3	3–1
Lugano	0–0	4–1	0–2	4–0		0–0	0–0	3–2
Luzern	1–0	2–1	0–0	0–0	1–1		1–0	3–2
Neuchâtel Xamax	3–0	5–1	1–2	2–1	5–2	3–3		0–2
Sion	2–0	1–2	1–1	5–1	2–1	2–1	2–2	

Source: rsssf.com
Legend: Blue = home team win; Yellow = draw; Red = away team win.

== Attendances ==
#	Club	Average attendance	Highest attendance
1	Basel	14,767	28,000
2	Xamax	9,833	15,600
3	Luzern	9,042	16,500
4	Sion	8,044	11,000
5	GCZ	6,356	16,100
6	St. Gallen	5,461	10,200
7	Aarau	5,400	9,300
8	Young Boys	4,714	9,900
9	Servette	4,650	7,500
10	Lausanne	4,392	8,500
11	Lugano	4,317	7,200
12	Zürich	3,875	12,000

== Nationalliga B ==
=== Qualification phase ===
The qualification of the NLB began on 30 July 1994 and was completed on 23 October. The top two teams in each group were qualified for the promotion/relegation group, they also competed in play-offs for the title of NLB champions. The bottom six teams in each group would play against relegation.

==== Table group West ====
Pos	Team	Pld	W	D	L	GF	GA	GD	Pts	Qualification
1	Yverdon-Sport	14	9	4	1	45	18	+27	22	Advance to promotion/relegation NLA/LNB round
2	Solothurn	14	7	2	5	18	15	+3	16	Advance to promotion/relegation NLA/LNB round
3	Étoile Carouge	14	6	4	4	20	24	−4	16	Continue to relegation round NLB/1. Liga halved points (rounded up) as bonus
4	Grenchen	14	4	7	3	25	26	−1	15	Continue to relegation round NLB/1. Liga halved points (rounded up) as bonus
5	Baden	14	5	4	5	21	24	−3	14	Continue to relegation round NLB/1. Liga halved points (rounded up) as bonus
6	Delémont	14	4	5	5	21	21	0	13	Continue to relegation round NLB/1. Liga halved points (rounded up) as bonus
7	Echallens	14	3	2	9	13	21	−8	8	Continue to relegation round NLB/1. Liga halved points (rounded up) as bonus
8	Chênois	14	3	2	9	14	28	−14	8	Continue to relegation round NLB/1. Liga halved points (rounded up) as bonus

Source: rsssf.com
Rules for classification: 1) Points; 2) Goal difference; 3) Goals scored; 4) Head-to-head points; 5) Away goals scored; 6) Draw.

==== Table group East ====
Pos	Team	Pld	W	D	L	GF	GA	GD	Pts	Qualification
1	Kriens	14	8	4	2	22	9	+13	20	Advance to promotion/relegation NLA/LNB round
2	Winterthur	14	9	1	4	25	19	+6	19	Advance to promotion/relegation NLA/LNB round
3	Locarno	14	7	3	4	33	17	+16	17	Continue to relegation round NLB/1. Liga halved points (rounded up) as bonus
4	Bellinzona	14	7	2	5	22	16	+6	16	Continue to relegation round NLB/1. Liga halved points (rounded up) as bonus
5	Wil	14	5	5	4	21	13	+8	15	Continue to relegation round NLB/1. Liga halved points (rounded up) as bonus
6	FC Schaffhausen	14	6	3	5	23	22	+1	15	Continue to relegation round NLB/1. Liga halved points (rounded up) as bonus
7	Tuggen	14	2	1	11	10	31	−21	5	Continue to relegation round NLB/1. Liga halved points (rounded up) as bonus
8	Gossau	14	1	3	10	12	41	−29	5	Continue to relegation round NLB/1. Liga halved points (rounded up) as bonus

Source: rsssf.com
Rules for classification: 1) Points; 2) Goal difference; 3) Goals scored; 4) Head-to-head points; 5) Away goals scored; 6) Draw.

=== Play-off for NLB championship ===
The top two teams in the two groups were qualified for the promotion/relegation group. But in advance they played play-offs to decide the NLB championship. The two legged semi-finals were played on 6 and 13 November. The final for the championship and the decider for third place were played on 20 and 23 November 1994.

Semi-finals

Team 1	Score	Team 2
Winterthur	1–3	Yverdon-Sport
Yverdon-Sport	1–1	Winterthur

Yverdon-Sport won 4–2 on aggregate and continued to the final.

Team 1	Score	Team 2
Solothurn	2–1	Kriens
Kriens	2–2 a.e.t.	Solothurn

Solothurn won 4–3 on aggregate and continued to the final.

Third place

Team 1	Score	Team 2
Kriens	2–2	Winterthur
Winterthur	2–0	Kriens

Winterthur won 4–2 on aggregate and declared third.

Final

Team 1	Score	Team 2
Yverdon-Sport	0–0	Solothurn
Solothurn	1–2	Yverdon-Sport

Yverdon-Sport won 2–1 on aggregate and declared NLB champions, Solothurn as runner-up

=== Promotion/relegation group NLA/NLB ===
The teams in the ninth to twelfth positions in Nationalliga A competed with the top four teams of Nationalliga B in a Nationalliga A/B promotion/relegation round. The stage began on 26 February and was completed on 13 June 1995.

==== Table ====
Pos	Team	Pld	W	D	L	GF	GA	GD	Pts	Qualification
1	BSC Young Boys	14	7	3	4	22	14	+8	17	Remain in 1995–96 Nationalliga A
2	FC St. Gallen	14	5	6	3	20	13	+7	16	Remain in 1995–96 Nationalliga A
3	FC Zürich	14	5	6	3	19	16	+3	16	Remain in 1995–96 Nationalliga A
4	Servette FC	14	5	6	3	15	13	+2	16	Remain in 1995–96 Nationalliga A
5	SC Kriens	14	4	7	3	18	14	+4	15	Remain in Nationalliga B
6	Yverdon-Sport FC	14	6	3	5	18	15	+3	15	Remain in Nationalliga B
7	FC Winterthur	14	3	7	4	13	13	0	13	Remain in Nationalliga B
8	FC Solothurn	14	0	4	10	4	31	−27	4	Remain in Nationalliga B

Source: rsssf.com
Rules for classification: 1) Points; 2) Goal difference; 3) Goals scored; 4) Head-to-head points; 5) Away goals scored; 6) Draw.

==== Results ====
Home \ Away	KRI	SER	SOL	STG	WIN	YB	YS	ZÜR
Kriens		2–1	0–0	2–2	1–1	0–1	1–0	1–1
Servette	1–1		2–0	0–0	0–0	2–1	3–3	0–0
Solothurn	1–1	0–1		0–3	0–0	0–3	0–1	2–2
St. Gallen	1–0	1–1	3–0		1–1	2–2	0–1	1–1
Winterthur	1–2	3–1	3–1	0–2		3–1	0–0	0–1
Young Boys	0–0	2–1	4–0	2–1	2–0		0–1	2–2
Yverdon-Sport	3–2	0–1	3–0	1–2	1–1	1–2		2–1
Zürich	1–5	0–1	5–0	2–1	0–0	1–0	2–1	

Source: RSSSF
Legend: Blue = home team win; Yellow = draw; Red = away team win.

=== Relegation group NLB/1. Liga ===
The last six teams in each of the two qualification phase groups competed in the relegation group against relegation to the 1. Liga. The teams all entered the phase in one sole group. The teams took half of the points (rounded up to complete units) gained in the qualification as bonus with them. As the NLB was to be reduced to one single group the following season, six teams would be relegated to the 1995–96 Swiss 1. Liga. This stage began on 25 November 1994 and was completed on 17 June 1995.

==== Table ====
Pos	Team	Pld	W	D	L	GF	GA	GD	BP	Pts	Qualification or relegation
1	FC Schaffhausen	22	8	12	2	35	17	+18	8	36	Remain in NLB
2	SR Delémont	22	12	5	5	38	21	+17	7	36	Remain in NLB
3	Wil	22	11	6	5	32	16	+16	8	36	Remain in NLB
4	AC Bellinzona	22	11	6	5	29	19	+10	8	36	Licence revoked, relegated to 1995–96 Swiss 1. Liga
5	FC Locarno	22	8	8	6	29	28	+1	9	33	Remain in NLB
6	FC Grenchen	22	9	7	6	25	25	0	8	33	Licence revoked, relegated to 1995–96 Swiss 1. Liga
7	FC Baden	22	8	8	6	34	27	+7	7	31	Remain in NLB, see note below
8	Étoile Carouge	22	8	4	10	37	33	+4	8	28	Remain in NLB, see note below
9	FC Gossau	22	7	7	8	32	36	−4	3	24	Relegated to 1995–96 Swiss 1. Liga
10	CS Chênois	22	4	9	9	22	35	−13	4	21	Relegated to 1995–96 Swiss 1. Liga
11	FC Echallens	22	4	4	14	13	37	−24	4	16	Relegated to 1995–96 Swiss 1. Liga
12	FC Tuggen	22	2	4	16	18	50	−32	3	11	Relegated to 1995–96 Swiss 1. Liga

Source: RSSSF
Rules for classification: 1) points; 2) Position in the qualification; 3) Goal difference; 4) Goals scored; 5) Head-to-head points; 6) Away goals scored; 7) Draw.

Note

Because AC Bellinzona and FC Grenchen had their licenses for the following season revoked they were relegated to the 1. Liga. Therefore, FC Baden and Étoile Carouge remained in the NLB in the following season.

== Further in Swiss football ==
- 1994–95 Swiss Cup
- 1994–95 Swiss 1. Liga

== Sources ==
- Switzerland 1994–95 at RSSSF
- Switzerland - List of Champions rsssf.com
