= 1995–96 Swiss 1. Liga =

1. Liga
- Season: 1995–96
- Champions: Overall; Gossau; Group 1: FC Renens; Group 2: Fribourg; Group 3: Bellinzona; Group 4: Gossau
- Promoted: Gossau; FC Meyrin
- Relegated: Group 1: FC Fully; FC Raron; Group 2: Old Boys; FC Le Locle; Group 3: Tresa-Monteggio; FC Kölliken; Emmenbrücke; Group 4: SC Brühl; FC Stäfa
- Matches: 4 times 182 and 1 decider plus 12 play-offs and 4 play-outs

The 1995–96 Swiss 1. Liga was the 64th season of this league since its creation in 1931. At this time, the 1. Liga was the third tier of the Swiss football league system and it was the highest level of amateur football.

== Format ==
There were 56 clubs in the 1. Liga, divided into four regional groups of 14 teams. Within each group, the teams would play a double round-robin to decide their league position. The four group winners and the four runners-up then contested a play-off for the two promotion slots. The two last placed teams in each group were directly relegated to the 2. Liga (fourth tier). The four third-last placed teams would compete a play-out against the ninth relegation place.

== Group 1 ==
=== Teams ===
| Club | Canton | Stadium | Capacity |
|---|---|---|---|
| FC Bulle | Fribourg | Stade de Bouleyres | 7,000 |
| CS Chênois | Geneva | Stade des Trois-Chêne | 8,000 |
| FC Echallens | Vaud | Sportplatz 3 Sapins | 2,000 |
| FC Fully | Valais | Stade de Charnot | 1,000 |
| Grand-Lancy FC | Geneva | Stade de Marignac | 1,500 |
| FC Martigny-Sports | Valais | Stade d'Octodure | 2,500 |
| FC Meyrin | Geneva | Stade des Arbères | 9,000 |
| FC Monthey | Valais | Stade Philippe Pottier | 1,800 |
| FC Montreux-Sports | Vaud | Stade de Chailly | 1,000 |
| FC Raron | Valais | Sportplatz Rhoneglut | 1,000 |
| FC Renens | Waadt | Zone sportive du Censuy | 2,300 |
| FC Stade Lausanne | Vaud | Centre sportif de Vidy | 1,000 |
| FC Stade Nyonnais | Vaud | Stade de Colovray | 7,200 |
| Vevey Sports | Vaud | Stade de Copet | 4,000 |

=== Final league table ===
| Pos | Team | Pld | W | D | L | GF | GA | GD | Pts | Qualification or relegation |
|---|---|---|---|---|---|---|---|---|---|---|
| 1 | FC Renens | 26 | 16 | 8 | 2 | 57 | 23 | +34 | 56 | Play-off to Nationalliga B |
| 2 | FC Meyrin | 26 | 18 | 2 | 6 | 57 | 25 | +32 | 56 | Play-off to Nationalliga B |
| 3 | CS Chênois | 26 | 17 | 4 | 5 | 56 | 26 | +30 | 55 | |
| 4 | FC Stade Nyonnais | 26 | 15 | 7 | 4 | 69 | 30 | +39 | 52 | |
| 5 | FC Bulle | 26 | 12 | 6 | 8 | 42 | 33 | +9 | 42 | |
| 6 | FC Monthey | 26 | 11 | 8 | 7 | 52 | 36 | +16 | 41 | |
| 7 | FC Martigny-Sports | 26 | 10 | 8 | 8 | 52 | 49 | +3 | 38 | |
| 8 | Grand-Lancy FC | 26 | 10 | 6 | 10 | 39 | 43 | −4 | 36 | |
| 9 | FC Echallens | 26 | 9 | 4 | 13 | 37 | 50 | −13 | 31 | |
| 10 | FC Stade Lausanne | 26 | 8 | 6 | 12 | 29 | 42 | −13 | 30 | |
| 11 | FC Montreux-Sports | 26 | 7 | 5 | 14 | 30 | 48 | −18 | 26 | |
| 12 | Vevey Sports | 26 | 5 | 7 | 14 | 31 | 53 | −22 | 22 | Play-out against relegation |
| 13 | FC Fully | 26 | 4 | 4 | 18 | 37 | 80 | −43 | 16 | Relegation to 2. Liga |
| 14 | FC Raron | 26 | 1 | 3 | 22 | 19 | 69 | −50 | 6 | Relegation to 2. Liga |

Source: RSSSF
Rules for classification: 1) Points; 2) Goal difference within the league, but play-off for qualifiers.

== Group 2 ==
=== Teams ===
| Club | Canton | Stadium | Capacity |
|---|---|---|---|
| FC Biel-Bienne | Bern | Stadion Gurzelen | 15,000 |
| SC Bümpliz 78 | Bern | Bodenweid | 4,000 |
| FC Colombier | Neuchâtel | Stade des Chézards | 2,500 |
| FC Concordia Basel | Basel-City | Stadion Rankhof | 7,000 |
| FC Fribourg | Fribourg | Stade Universitaire | 9,000 |
| FC Grenchen | Solothurn | Stadium Brühl | 15,100 |
| FC La Chaux-de-Fonds | Neuchâtel | Centre Sportif de la Charrière | 12,700 |
| FC Le Locle | Neuchâtel | Installation sportive - Jeanneret | 3,142 |
| SV Lyss | Bern | Sportzentrum Grien | 2,000 |
| FC Münsingen | Bern | Sportanlage Sandreutenen | 1,400 |
| BSC Old Boys | Basel-City | Stadion Schützenmatte | 8,000 |
| FC Riehen | Basel-City | Sportplatz Grendelmatte | 2,500 |
| FC Serrières | Neuchâtel | Pierre-à-Bot | 1,700 |
| FC Thun | Bern | Stadion Lachen | 10,350 |

=== Final league table ===
| Pos | Team | Pld | W | D | L | GF | GA | GD | Pts | Qualification or relegation |
|---|---|---|---|---|---|---|---|---|---|---|
| 1 | FC Fribourg | 26 | 21 | 3 | 2 | 66 | 18 | +48 | 66 | Play-off to Nationalliga B |
| 2 | FC Münsingen | 26 | 14 | 5 | 7 | 47 | 30 | +17 | 47 | Play-off to Nationalliga B |
| 3 | FC Grenchen | 26 | 12 | 10 | 4 | 42 | 26 | +16 | 46 | |
| 4 | FC Thun | 26 | 14 | 2 | 10 | 46 | 38 | +8 | 44 | |
| 5 | FC Biel-Bienne | 26 | 11 | 6 | 9 | 40 | 28 | +12 | 39 | |
| 6 | FC Colombier | 26 | 11 | 6 | 9 | 38 | 30 | +8 | 39 | |
| 7 | SV Lyss | 26 | 9 | 11 | 6 | 39 | 39 | 0 | 38 | |
| 8 | FC Serrières | 26 | 9 | 7 | 10 | 43 | 36 | +7 | 34 | |
| 9 | FC La Chaux-de-Fonds | 26 | 9 | 4 | 13 | 33 | 46 | −13 | 31 | |
| 10 | SC Bümpliz 78] | 26 | 8 | 6 | 12 | 38 | 44 | −6 | 30 | |
| 11 | FC Concordia Basel | 26 | 9 | 2 | 15 | 40 | 58 | −18 | 29 | |
| 12 | FC Riehen | 26 | 7 | 7 | 12 | 44 | 46 | −2 | 28 | Play-out against relegation |
| 13 | BSC Old Boys | 26 | 6 | 5 | 15 | 30 | 58 | −28 | 23 | Relegation to 2. Liga |
| 14 | FC Le Locle | 26 | 2 | 6 | 18 | 13 | 62 | −49 | 12 | Relegation to 2. Liga |

Source: RSSSF
Rules for classification: 1) Points; 2) Goal difference within the league, but play-off for qualifiers.

== Group 3 ==
=== Teams ===
| Club | Canton | Stadium | Capacity |
|---|---|---|---|
| FC Ascona | Ticino | Stadio Comunale Ascona | 1,400 |
| AC Bellinzona | Ticino | Stadio Comunale Bellinzona | 5,000 |
| SC Buochs | Nidwalden | Stadion Seefeld | 5,000 |
| FC Emmenbrücke | Lucerne | Stadion Gersag | 8,700 |
| FC Freienbach | Schwyz | Chrummen | 4,500 |
| FC Hochdorf | Lucerne | Arena | 3,150 |
| FC Kölliken | Aargau | Sportstätte Walke | 2,000 |
| FC Klus-Balsthal | Solothurn | Sportplatz Moos | 4,000 |
| FC Mendrisio | Ticino | Centro Sportivo Comunale | 4,000 |
| FC Muri | Aargau | Stadion Brühl | 2,350 |
| FC Suhr | Aargau | Hofstattmatten | 2,000 |
| FC Sursee | Lucerne | Stadion Schlottermilch | 3,500 |
| FC Tresa-Monteggio | Ticino | Cornaredo Stadium | 6,330 |
| Zug 94 | Zug | Herti Allmend Stadion | 6,000 |

=== Final league table ===
| Pos | Team | Pld | W | D | L | GF | GA | GD | Pts | Qualification or relegation |
|---|---|---|---|---|---|---|---|---|---|---|
| 1 | AC Bellinzona | 26 | 20 | 5 | 1 | 66 | 13 | +53 | 65 | Play-off to Nationalliga B |
| 2 | FC Ascona | 26 | 15 | 7 | 4 | 44 | 23 | +21 | 52 | Decider winners, play-off to Nationalliga B |
| 3 | SC Buochs | 26 | 15 | 7 | 4 | 50 | 22 | +28 | 52 | Decider for play-off |
| 4 | Zug 94 | 26 | 12 | 7 | 7 | 35 | 24 | +11 | 43 | |
| 5 | FC Freienbach | 26 | 11 | 8 | 7 | 40 | 38 | +2 | 41 | |
| 6 | FC Muri | 26 | 9 | 4 | 13 | 29 | 35 | −6 | 31 | |
| 7 | FC Suhr | 26 | 6 | 13 | 7 | 28 | 34 | −6 | 31 | |
| 8 | FC Klus-Balsthal | 26 | 7 | 10 | 9 | 36 | 43 | −7 | 31 | |
| 9 | FC Sursee | 26 | 8 | 6 | 12 | 29 | 36 | −7 | 30 | |
| 10 | FC Hochdorf | 26 | 7 | 8 | 11 | 25 | 33 | −8 | 29 | |
| 11 | FC Mendrisio | 26 | 8 | 5 | 13 | 25 | 41 | −16 | 29 | |
| 12 | FC Emmenbrücke | 26 | 8 | 4 | 14 | 29 | 47 | −18 | 28 | Play-out against relegation |
| 13 | FC Tresa-Monteggio | 26 | 6 | 6 | 14 | 25 | 35 | −10 | 24 | Relegation to 2. Liga |
| 14 | FC Kölliken | 26 | 3 | 4 | 19 | 19 | 56 | −37 | 13 | Relegation to 2. Liga |

Source: RSSSF
Rules for classification: 1) Points; 2) Goal difference within the league, but play-off for qualifiers.

=== Decider ===
The decider for second position in the table was played 21 May 1996 in Stadio Comunale Bellinzona.

| Team 1 | Score | Team 2 |
|---|---|---|
| FC Ascona | 2–0 | SC Buochs |

FC Ascona advance to play-offs.

== Group 4 ==
=== Teams ===
| Club | Canton | Stadium | Capacity |
|---|---|---|---|
| FC Altstetten | Zürich | Buchlern | 1,000 |
| SC Brühl | St. Gallen | Paul-Grüninger-Stadion | 4,200 |
| FC Bülach | Zürich | Stadion Erachfeld | 3,500 |
| FC Dübendorf | Zürich | Zelgli | 1,500 |
| FC Frauenfeld | Thurgau | Kleine Allmend | 6,370 |
| FC Glarus | Glarus | Buchholz | 800 |
| FC Gossau | St. Gallen | Sportanlage Buechenwald | 3,500 |
| FC Red Star Zürich | Zürich | Allmend Brunau | 2,000 |
| FC Rorschach | Schwyz | Sportplatz Kellen | 1,000 |
| SV Schaffhausen | Schaffhausen | Sportplatz Bühl | 1,000 |
| FC Stäfa | Zürich | Sportanlage Frohberg | 1,500 |
| FC Tuggen | Schwyz | Linthstrasse | 2,800 |
| FC Vaduz | Liechtenstein | Rheinpark Stadion | 7,584 |
| SC YF Juventus | Zürich | Utogrund | 2,850 |

=== Final league table ===
| Pos | Team | Pld | W | D | L | GF | GA | GD | Pts | Qualification or relegation |
|---|---|---|---|---|---|---|---|---|---|---|
| 1 | FC Gossau | 26 | 16 | 4 | 6 | 66 | 29 | +37 | 52 | Play-off to Nationalliga B |
| 2 | FC Altstetten | 26 | 13 | 8 | 5 | 53 | 28 | +25 | 47 | Play-off to Nationalliga B |
| 3 | FC Tuggen | 26 | 13 | 6 | 7 | 46 | 31 | +15 | 45 | |
| 4 | FC Frauenfeld | 26 | 10 | 10 | 6 | 33 | 26 | +7 | 40 | |
| 5 | FC Rorschach | 26 | 10 | 8 | 8 | 40 | 37 | +3 | 38 | |
| 6 | FC Dübendorf | 26 | 10 | 6 | 10 | 46 | 49 | −3 | 36 | |
| 7 | FC Red Star Zürich | 26 | 10 | 6 | 10 | 40 | 44 | −4 | 36 | |
| 8 | SC Young Fellows Juventus | 26 | 9 | 8 | 9 | 36 | 35 | +1 | 35 | |
| 9 | FC Glarus | 26 | 9 | 8 | 9 | 40 | 46 | −6 | 35 | |
| 10 | FC Bülach | 26 | 9 | 7 | 10 | 36 | 44 | −8 | 34 | |
| 11 | SV Schaffhausen | 26 | 8 | 8 | 10 | 29 | 36 | −7 | 32 | |
| 12 | FC Vaduz | 26 | 7 | 8 | 11 | 26 | 38 | −12 | 29 | Play-out against relegation |
| 13 | SC Brühl | 26 | 6 | 5 | 15 | 34 | 60 | −26 | 23 | Relegation to 2. Liga |
| 14 | FC Stäfa | 26 | 4 | 4 | 18 | 26 | 48 | −22 | 16 | Relegation to 2. Liga |

Source: RSSSF
Rules for classification: 1) Points; 2) Goal difference within the league, but play-off for qualifiers.

== Promotion play-off ==
=== Qualification round ===
| Team 1 | Score | Team 2 |
|---|---|---|
| FC Altstetten | 0–1 | AC Bellinzona |
| AC Bellinzona | 1–1 | FC Altstetten |

AC Bellinzona win 2–1 on aggregate and continue to the finals.

| Team 1 | Score | Team 2 |
|---|---|---|
| FC Ascona | 1–1 | FC Gossau |
| FC Gossau | 4–3 | FC Ascona |

FC Gossau win 5–4 on aggregate and continue to the finals.

| Team 1 | Score | Team 2 |
|---|---|---|
| FC Münsingen | 1–0 | FC Renens |
| FC Renens | 1–0 | FC Münsingen |

1–1 on aggregate. FC Renens win 6–5 in penalties and continue to the finals.

| Team 1 | Score | Team 2 |
|---|---|---|
| FC Meyrin | 0–0 | FC Fribourg |
| FC Fribourg | 0–2 | FC Meyrin |

FC Meyrin win 2–0 on aggregate and continue to the finals.

=== Final round ===
| Team 1 | Score | Team 2 |
|---|---|---|
| FC Gossau | 1–0 | AC Bellinzona |
| AC Bellinzona | 0–3 | FC Gossau |

FC Gossau win 4–0 on aggregate and are promoted to Nationalliga B.

| Team 1 | Score | Team 2 |
|---|---|---|
| FC Meyrin | 2–2 | FC Renens |
| FC Renens | 2–6 | FC Meyrin |

FC Meyrin win 8–4 on aggregate and are promoted to Nationalliga B.

== Relegation play-out ==
The first round in the play-outs were played on 25 May as single legged semi-finals on neutral grounds. The first match at the Linthstrasse in Tuggen and the other at the Stadion Gurzelen in Biel/Bienne. The final was played two legged at home and away.

=== First round ===
| Team 1 | Score | Team 2 |
|---|---|---|
| FC Vaduz | 5–0 | FC Emmenbrücke |

FC Emmenbrücke continue to the finals.

| Team 1 | Score | Team 2 |
|---|---|---|
| FC Riehen | 4–0 | Vevey Sports |

Vevey Sports continue to the finals.

=== Final round ===
| Team 1 | Score | Team 2 |
|---|---|---|
| Vevey Sports | 1–1 | FC Emmenbrücke |
| FC Emmenbrücke | 1–6 | Vevey Sports |

Vevey Sports win 7–2 on aggregate and remain in the 1. Liga. FC Emmenbrücke are relegated to 2. Liga.

== See also ==
- 1995–96 Nationalliga A
- 1995–96 Nationalliga B
- 1995–96 Swiss Cup

== Sources ==
- Switzerland 1995–96 at RSSSF

| Preceded by 1994–95 | Seasons in Swiss 1. Liga | Succeeded by 1996–97 |
