= 1995–96 Nationalliga A =

Swiss football season

Nationalliga A
- Season: 1995–96
- Champions: Grasshopper Club
- Relegated: none
- Top goalscorer: Viorel Moldovan and Petar Aleksandrov (both 27 goals)

Nationalliga B
- Season: 1995–96
- Champions: Yverdon-Sport
- Promoted: none
- Relegated: Naters; Chiasso

Statistics of the two divisions of the Swiss National League in the 1995–96 football season.

== Overview ==
The 24 teams of the Swiss Football League (Nationalliga) were divided into two divisions. Both Nationalliga A (NLA) and Nationalliga B (NLB) were contested by 12 teams, with each team playing a double round-robin in the qualification phase. Thereafter the divisions were divided into a championship group, a NLA/NLB promotion/relegation group and a relegation group NLB/1. Liga, each group with eight teams.

== Nationalliga A ==
=== Qualification phase ===
The first stage of the NLA began on 22 July 1995 and was completed on 3 December. The top eight teams in the qualification phase would advance to the championship group and the last four teams would play against relegation.

==== Table ====
Pos	Team	Pld	W	D	L	GF	GA	GD	Pts	Qualification
1	Grasshopper Club	22	13	4	5	38	22	+16	43	Advance to championship round halved points (rounded up) as bonus
2	Sion	22	13	3	6	37	28	+9	42	Advance to championship round halved points (rounded up) as bonus
3	Xamax	22	12	5	5	40	24	+16	41	Advance to championship round halved points (rounded up) as bonus
4	Luzern	22	11	7	4	36	25	+11	40	Advance to championship round halved points (rounded up) as bonus
5	Basel	22	9	3	10	23	29	−6	30	Advance to championship round halved points (rounded up) as bonus
6	Servette	22	7	7	8	28	28	0	28	Advance to championship round halved points (rounded up) as bonus
7	Aarau	22	7	6	9	36	27	+9	27	Advance to championship round halved points (rounded up) as bonus
8	St. Gallen	22	6	9	7	26	24	+2	27	Advance to championship round halved points (rounded up) as bonus
9	Lausanne-Sport	22	6	9	7	25	25	0	27	Continue to promotion/relegation round
10	Lugano	22	5	6	11	21	42	−21	21	Continue to promotion/relegation round
11	Zürich	22	4	6	12	17	32	−15	18	Continue to promotion/relegation round
12	Young Boys	22	4	5	13	14	35	−21	17	Continue to promotion/relegation round

Source: rsssf.com
Rules for classification: 1) Points; 2) Goal difference; 3) Goals scored; 4) Head-to-head points; 5) Away goals scored; 6) Draw.

==== Results ====
Home \ Away	AAR	BAS	GCZ	LS	LUG	LUZ	NX	SER	SIO	STG	YB	ZÜR
Aarau		2–0	1–1	3–0	5–0	1–1	2–2	2–4	0–1	5–1	0–0	2–0
Basel	2–1		1–3	0–1	0–2	2–0	0–2	2–2	2–1	0–0	1–0	0–3
Grasshopper	2–1	1–3		1–1	1–0	4–0	2–1	1–1	2–0	3–1	3–0	2–0
Lausanne-Sport	0–2	1–0	1–2		3–0	3–1	1–1	0–0	1–1	0–0	2–0	3–0
Lugano	2–0	0–1	1–1	1–1		1–1	0–3	0–2	1–3	1–1	2–0	1–1
Luzern	3–0	3–1	2–0	1–1	1–1		3–2	2–1	3–2	1–1	3–1	1–0
Neuchâtel Xamax	3–2	1–0	2–1	4–2	4–0	1–1		1–0	3–0	3–0	0–1	0–2
Servette	2–1	1–2	2–0	1–1	2–3	1–0	3–0		0–1	2–2	0–0	0–0
Sion	2–1	4–1	2–1	1–0	5–2	1–3	1–1	3–1		1–0	0–1	2–2
St. Gallen	0–0	0–1	1–2	2–1	3–0	1–1	1–1	4–0	3–0		0–0	1–0
Young Boys	0–4	1–4	0–1	1–1	3–1	0–4	1–2	1–2	1–4	2–0		2–0
Zürich	1–1	0–0	1–4	3–1	1–2	0–1	1–3	2–1	0–1	0–4	0–0	

Source: RSSSF
Legend: Blue = home team win; Yellow = draw; Red = away team win.

=== Championship group ===
The first eight teams of the qualification phase competed in the Championship round. The teams took half of the points (rounded up to complete units) gained in the qualification as bonus with them.

==== Table ====
Pos	Team	Pld	W	D	L	GF	GA	GD	BP	Pts	Qualification
1	Grasshopper Club	14	8	6	0	26	7	+19	22	52	Swiss champions, qualified for 1996–97 Champions League
2	Sion	14	8	2	4	20	14	+6	21	47	Swiss Cup winners, qualified for 1996–97 Cup Winners' Cup
3	Xamax	14	5	7	2	21	16	+5	21	43	qualified for 1996–97 UEFA Cup
4	Aarau	14	7	4	3	23	18	+5	14	39	qualified for 1996–97 UEFA Cup
5	Luzern	14	4	3	7	23	19	+4	20	35	entered 1996 UEFA Intertoto Cup
6	Basel	14	3	4	7	11	20	−9	15	28	entered 1996 UEFA Intertoto Cup
7	Servette	14	2	5	7	18	25	−7	14	25	
8	St. Gallen	14	2	3	9	11	34	−23	14	23	

Source: rsssf.com
Rules for classification: 1) points; 2) Position in the qualification.

==== Results ====
Home \ Away	AAR	BAS	GCZ	LUZ	NX	SER	SIO	STG
Aarau		1–0	0–0	2–2	3–2	3–0	1–0	4–0
Basel	1–3		0–2	1–0	1–2	2–0	2–0	1–1
Grasshopper	0–0	3–0		2–1	3–3	2–0	3–0	3–0
Luzern	4–0	1–1	1–2		0–1	2–1	2–3	5–0
Neuchâtel Xamax	3–1	1–1	0–0	1–1		1–1	2–0	3–0
Servette	1–1	1–1	2–2	3–4	4–1		0–1	3–2
Sion	2–0	2–0	0–0	1–0	1–1	3–2		3–1
St. Gallen	3–4	3–0	0–4	1–0	0–0	0–0	0–4	

Source: RSSSF
Legend: Blue = home team win; Yellow = draw; Red = away team win.

== Nationalliga B ==
=== Qualification phase ===
The NLB was contested by 12 teams with each team playing each other twice in the qualification phase. The first stage began on 13 July 1996 and was completed on 23 November. The division was then separated into a NLA/NLB promotion/relegation group and a relegation group to the 1. Liga. The top four teams would play for promotion and the last eight teams would play against relegation.

==== Table ====
Pos	Team	Pld	W	D	L	GF	GA	GD	Pts	Qualification or relegation
1	Kriens	22	14	2	6	43	23	+20	44	Advance to promotion/relegation NLA/LNB round
2	Yverdon-Sport	22	11	5	6	41	23	+18	38	Advance to promotion/relegation NLA/LNB round
3	Delémont	22	11	5	6	40	33	+7	38	Advance to promotion/relegation NLA/LNB round
4	Étoile Carouge	22	9	8	5	26	24	+2	35	Advance to promotion/relegation NLA/LNB round
5	Winterthur	22	9	5	8	26	21	+5	32	Continue to relegation round NLB/1. Liga halved points (rounded up) as bonus
6	Baden	22	9	5	8	31	27	+4	32	Continue to relegation round NLB/1. Liga halved points (rounded up) as bonus
7	FC Schaffhausen	22	7	7	8	33	31	+2	28	Continue to relegation round NLB/1. Liga halved points (rounded up) as bonus
8	Wil	22	7	7	8	34	36	−2	28	Continue to relegation round NLB/1. Liga halved points (rounded up) as bonus
9	Chiasso	22	6	7	9	19	25	−6	25	Continue to relegation round NLB/1. Liga halved points (rounded up) as bonus
10	Solothurn	22	6	5	11	26	37	−11	23	Continue to relegation round NLB/1. Liga halved points (rounded up) as bonus
11	Locarno	22	5	6	11	20	33	−13	21	Continue to relegation round NLB/1. Liga halved points (rounded up) as bonus
12	Naters	22	4	6	12	16	42	−26	18	Continue to relegation round NLB/1. Liga halved points (rounded up) as bonus

Source: rsssf.com
Rules for classification: 1) Points; 2) Goal difference; 3) Goals scored; 4) Head-to-head points; 5) Away goals scored; 6) Draw.

=== Promotion/relegation group NLA/NLB ===
The teams in the ninth to twelfth positions in Nationalliga A competed with the top four teams of the Nationalliga B in a Nationalliga A/B promotion/relegation round. The top four teams would play in the top-tier the following season, the other four would play in the second tier.

==== Table ====
Pos	Team	Pld	W	D	L	GF	GA	GD	Pts	Qualification
1	Young Boys	14	10	3	1	28	13	+15	33	Remain in 1996–97 Nationalliga A
2	Zürich	14	8	4	2	21	12	+9	28	Remain in 1996–97 Nationalliga A
3	Lausanne-Sport	14	7	6	1	24	10	+14	27	Remain in 1996–97 Nationalliga A
4	Lugano	14	4	5	5	13	17	−4	17	Remain in 1996–97 Nationalliga A
5	Yverdon-Sport	14	3	4	7	16	22	−6	13	Remain in Nationalliga B
6	Delémont	14	3	4	7	17	26	−9	13	Remain in Nationalliga B
7	Kriens	14	2	5	7	14	22	−8	11	Remain in Nationalliga B
8	Etoile-Carouge	14	1	5	8	9	20	−11	8	Remain in Nationalliga B

Source: rsssf.com
Rules for classification: 1) Points; 2) Goal difference; 3) Goals scored; 4) Head-to-head points; 5) Away goals scored; 6) Draw.

==== Results ====
Home \ Away	DEL	ÉTO	KRI	LS	LUG	ZÜR	YB	YS
Delémont		1–1	3–2	1–1	1–0	0–1	1–1	1–3
Étoile Carouge	4–2		1–2	1–1	0–0	0–1	0–4	0–0
Kriens	4–1	0–0		0–5	0–1	0–1	1–3	2–2
Lausanne-Sport	2–0	1–0	0–0		3–0	2–0	1–1	1–0
Lugano	2–1	1–0	0–0	3–3		0–2	0–0	2–1
Zürich	1–1	2–0	2–1	2–2	1–1		4–1	1–1
Young Boys	3–2	2–0	2–1	1–0	3–2	2–1		3–0
Yverdon-Sport	1–2	3–2	1–1	1–2	2–1	1–2	0–2	

Source: rsssf.com
Legend: Blue = home team win; Yellow = draw; Red = away team win.

=== Relegation group NLB/1. Liga ===
The last eight teams of the qualification phase competed in the relegation group against relegation to the 1. Liga. The teams took half of the points (rounded up to complete units) gained in the qualification as bonus with them. At the end of the season the two bottom placed teams would be relegated to the 1996–97 Swiss 1. Liga.

==== Table ====
Pos	Team	Pld	W	D	L	GF	GA	GD	BP	Pts	Qualification or relegation
1	Winterthur	14	7	5	2	27	18	+9	16	42	Remain in NLB
2	Baden	14	7	1	6	21	22	−1	16	38	Remain in NLB
3	Wil	14	6	5	3	28	18	+10	14	37	Remain in NLB
4	FC Schaffhausen	14	6	4	4	15	16	−1	14	36	Remain in NLB
5	Solothurn	14	4	4	6	13	23	−10	12	28	Remain in NLB
6	Locarno	14	3	6	5	18	17	+1	11	26	Remain in NLB
7	Naters	14	4	5	5	13	14	−1	9	26	Relegated to 1. Liga
8	Chiasso	14	1	6	7	13	20	−7	13	22	Relegated to 1. Liga

Source: RSSSF
Rules for classification: 1) points; 2) Position in the qualification.

== Attendances ==
#	Club	Average
1	Basel	12,028
2	Luzern	10,942
3	Sion	9,933
4	Xamax	9,200
5	St. Gallen	8,089
6	GCZ	6,192
7	Aarau	5,383
8	Servette	5,228
9	Young Boys	4,804
10	Zürich	3,731
11	Lausanne	3,703
12	Lugano	2,950

== Further in Swiss football ==
- 1995–96 Swiss Cup
- 1995–96 Swiss 1. Liga

== Sources ==
- Switzerland 1995–96 at RSSSF
