= 1996–97 UEFA Cup Winners' Cup =

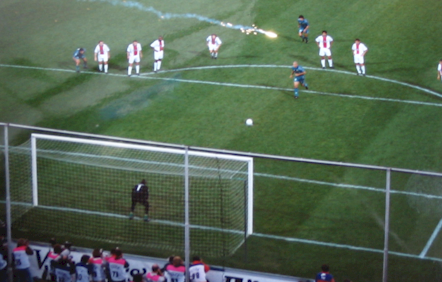
- Ronaldo's converted penalty in Rotterdam saw Barcelona beat PSG 1–0 and rack up a record fourth Cup Winners' Cup title.

Tournament details
- Dates: 8 August 1996 – 14 May 1997
- Teams: 49

Final positions
- Champions: (Spain) Barcelona (4th title)
- Runners-up: (France) Paris Saint-Germain

Tournament statistics
- Matches played: 95
- Goals scored: 252 (2.65 per match)
- Attendance: 1,346,295 (14,172 per match)
- Top scorer(s): Robbie Fowler (Liverpool); 7 goals

The 1996–97 season of the UEFA Cup Winners' Cup was won by Barcelona after beating holders Paris Saint-Germain in the final. It was the last of four occasions that the Spanish club won the tournament.

All times are CET/CEST. (Note: CET (UTC+1) for matches on 31 October 1996, 6 and 20 March 1997, and CEST (UTC+2) for all other matches.)

== Teams ==
Location of teams competing in the 1996-97 UEFA Cup Winners' Cup first round.
Yellow: Did not qualify from qualifying round; Red: Qualified for first round.

First round
(France) Paris Saint-Germain^{TH}	(Italy) Fiorentina	(France) Nîmes Olympique	(Spain) Barcelona
(Germany) Kaiserslautern	(Netherlands) PSV Eindhoven	(Portugal) Benfica	(England) Liverpool
(Belgium) Cercle Brugge	(Greece) AEK Athens	(Russia) Lokomotiv Moscow	(Turkey) Galatasaray
(Denmark) AGF	(Austria) Sturm Graz	(Sweden) AIK	
Qualifying round
(Switzerland) Sion	(Czech Republic) Sparta Prague	(Scotland) Heart of Midlothian	(Norway) Brann
(Ukraine) Nyva Vinnytsia	(Hungary) Kispest-Honvéd	(Romania) Gloria Bistrița	(Poland) Ruch Chorzów
(Israel) Hapoel Ironi Rishon LeZion	(Cyprus) AEK Larnaca	(Croatia) Varteks	(Latvia) Universitāte Rīga
(Slovakia) Chemlon Humenné	(Slovenia) Olimpija Ljubljana	(Georgia (country)) Dinamo Batumi	(Iceland) KR
(Finland) MyPa	(Bulgaria) Levski Sofia	(Belarus) MPKC Mozyr	(Northern Ireland) Glentoran
(North Macedonia) Sloga Jugomagnat	(Moldova) Constructorul Chișinău	(Republic of Ireland) Shelbourne	(Malta) Valletta
(Lithuania) Kareda Šiauliai	(Albania) Flamurtari Vlorë	Union Luxembourg	(Faroe Islands) HB Tórshavn
(Liechtenstein) FC Vaduz	(Wales) TNS Llansantffraid	(Armenia) Kotayk Abovyan	(Estonia) Tallinna Sadam
(Federal Republic of Yugoslavia) Red Star Belgrade	(Azerbaijan) Qarabağ		

^{TH} Title Holders

== Qualifying round ==
Team 1	Agg.	Team 2	1st leg	2nd leg
MPKC Mozyr (Belarus)	2–3	(Iceland) KR	2–2	0–1
Shelbourne (Republic of Ireland)	2–5	(Norway) Brann	1–3	1–2
TNS Llansantffraid (Wales)	1–6	(Poland) Ruch Chorzów	1–1	0–5
Kispest-Honvéd (Hungary)	2–0	(North Macedonia) Sloga Jugomagnat	1–0	1–0
Varteks (Croatia)	5–1	Union Luxembourg	2–1	3–0
Universitāte Rīga (Latvia)	2–2 (2–4 p)	(Liechtenstein) Vaduz	1–1	1–1 (aet)
Glentoran (Northern Ireland)	1–10	(Czech Republic) Sparta Prague	1–2	0–8
Dinamo Batumi (Georgia (country))	9–0	(Faroe Islands) HB Tórshavn	6–0	3–0
Tallinna Sadam (Estonia)	2–2 (a)	(Ukraine) Nyva Vinnytsia	2–1	0–1
Chemlon Humenné (Slovakia)	3–0	(Albania) Flamurtari Vlorë	1–0	2–0
Sion (Switzerland)	4–2	(Lithuania) Kareda Šiauliai	4–2	0–0
Olimpija Ljubljana (Slovenia)	1–1 (4–3 p)	(Bulgaria) Levski Sofia	1–0	0–1 (aet)
Red Star Belgrade (Federal Republic of Yugoslavia)	1–1 (a)	(Scotland) Heart of Midlothian	0–0	1–1
Qarabağ (Azerbaijan)	1–2	(Finland) MyPa	0–1	1–1 (aet)
Kotayk Abovyan (Armenia)	1–5	(Cyprus) AEK Larnaca	1–0	0–5
Constructorul Chișinău (Moldova)	3–3 (a)	(Israel) Hapoel Ironi Rishon LeZion	1–0	2–3
Valletta (Malta)	2–4	(Romania) Gloria Bistrița	1–2	1–2

=== First leg ===
8 August 1996
18:00

MPKC Mozyr (Belarus)	2–2	(Iceland) KR
Yaromka 51'; Skorabahatska 73'	Lineups	Daðason 87'; Þ. Jónsson 90'

Yunatstva, Mazyr
Attendance: 4,800
Referee: Armand Ancion (Belgium)

8 August 1996
19:45

Shelbourne (Republic of Ireland)	1–3	(Norway) Brann
S. Geoghegan 42'	Lineups	Mjelde 26'; M. Pedersen 29'; Eftevaag 68' (pen.)

Tolka Park, Dublin
Attendance: 3,010
Referee: Vítor Melo Pereira (Portugal)

8 August 1996
19:30

TNS Llansantffraid (Wales)	1–1	(Poland) Ruch Chorzów
Gęsior 82' (o.g.)	Lineups	Gęsior 6'

Racecourse Ground, Wrexham
Attendance: 1,558
Referee: Eyjólfur Ólafsson (Iceland)

8 August 1996
19:00

Kispest-Honvéd (Hungary)	1–0	(North Macedonia) Sloga Jugomagnat
Tóth 11'	Lineups

Bozsik József Stadion, Budapest
Attendance: 2,733
Referee: Serhiy Tatulyan (Ukraine)

8 August 1996
17:30

Varteks (Croatia)	2–1	Union Luxembourg
Mumlek 40'; Maretić 80' (pen.)	Lineups	Kharoubi 85'

Stadion Varteks, Varaždin
Attendance: 2,300
Referee: Josef Krula (Czech Republic)

8 August 1996
18:30

Universitāte Rīga (Latvia)	1–1	(Liechtenstein) Vaduz
Zariņš 43'	Lineups	Daumantas 40'

Latvijas Universitātes stadions, Riga
Attendance: 1,500
Referee: Merab Malaguradze (Georgia)

8 August 1996
19:30

Glentoran (Northern Ireland)	1–2	(Czech Republic) Sparta Prague
Little 53'	Lineups	Siegl 48'; Lokvenc 89'

The Oval, Belfast
Attendance: 2,200
Referee: Lawrence Sammut (Malta)

8 August 1996
18:00

Dinamo Batumi (Georgia (country))	6–0	(Faroe Islands) HB Tórshavn
Tugushi 11', 23', 54'; Ujmajuridze 27', 70'; Davidsen 87' (o.g.)	Lineups

Central Stadium, Batumi
Attendance: 6,400
Referee: Jüri Saar (Estonia)

8 August 1996
18:00

Tallinna Sadam (Estonia)	2–1	(Ukraine) Nyva Vinnytsia
Krõlov 25' (pen.); Viikmäe 76'	Lineups	Romanchuk 78'

Kadriorg Stadium, Tallinn
Attendance: 700
Referee: Asim Khudiev (Azerbaijan)

8 August 1996
17:00

Chemlon Humenné (Slovakia)	1–0	(Albania) Flamurtari Vlorë
Lyubarskyi 72'	Lineups

Chemlonský štadión, Humenné
Attendance: 5,320
Referee: Robert Sedlacek (Austria)

8 August 1996
20:00

Sion (Switzerland)	4–2	(Lithuania) Kareda Šiauliai
Chassot 14'; Bonvin 26'; Pančev 35' (pen.); Vercruysse 88'	Lineups	Mikalajūnas 73' (pen.); Dančenka 86'

Stade de Tourbillon, Sion
Attendance: 5,200
Referee: Yevi Kollari (Albania)

8 August 1996
20:15

Olimpija Ljubljana (Slovenia)	1–0	(Bulgaria) Levski Sofia
Bozgo 50'	Lineups

Stadion Bežigrad, Ljubljana
Attendance: 691
Referee: Marek Kowalczyk (Poland)

8 August 1996
18:30

Red Star Belgrade (Federal Republic of Yugoslavia)	0–0	(Scotland) Heart of Midlothian
	Lineups

Marakana, Belgrade
Attendance: 13,646
Referee: Hermann Albrecht (Germany)

8 August 1996
18:00

Qarabağ (Azerbaijan)	0–1	(Finland) MyPa
	Lineups	Mahlio 83'

Tofiq Bahramov Republican Stadium, Baku
Attendance: 11,500
Referee: Georgios Fasolis (Greece)

8 August 1996
18:00

Kotayk Abovyan (Armenia)	1–0	(Cyprus) AEK Larnaca
Berberyan 80'	Lineups

Hrazdan Stadium, Yerevan
Attendance: 3,600
Referee: Sergejs Braga (Latvia)

8 August 1996
19:00

Constructorul Chișinău (Moldova)	1–0	(Israel) Hapoel Ironi Rishon LeZion
Rogaciov 20'	Lineups

Stadionul Republican, Chișinău
Attendance: 4,500
Referee: Metin Tokat (Turkey)

8 August 1996
18:00

Valletta (Malta)	1–2	(Romania) Gloria Bistrița
Dončić 74'	Lineups	Matei 53'; Dăncuș 66'

National Stadium, Ta' Qali
Attendance: 1,093
Referee: Willie Young (Scotland)

=== Second leg ===
21 August 1996
20:00

KR (Iceland)	1–0	(Belarus) MPKC Mozyr
Daníelsson 90'	Lineups

KR-völlur, Reykjavík
Attendance: 1,722
Referee: Sven Kjelbrott (Norway)

KR won 3–2 on aggregate.

22 August 1996
19:00

Brann (Norway)	2–1	(Republic of Ireland) Shelbourne
Mjelde 9'; M. Pedersen 70'	Lineups	Rutherford 4'

Brann Stadion, Bergen
Attendance: 2,189
Referee: Keimpe Zuidema (Netherlands)

Brann won 5–2 on aggregate.

22 August 1996
16:30

Ruch Chorzów (Poland)	5–0	(Wales) TNS Llansantffraid
A. Bąk 2', 58'; Grzesik 47'; M. Bąk 63', 65'	Lineups

Ruch Chorzów Stadium, Chorzów
Attendance: 6,701
Referee: Dragutin Poljak (Croatia)

Ruch Chorzów won 6–1 on aggregate.

22 August 1996
16:00

Sloga Jugomagnat (North Macedonia)	0–1	(Hungary) Kispest-Honvéd
	Lineups	Ghinda 77'

Stadion Gradski Park, Skopje
Attendance: 1,000
Referee: Marcello Nicchi (Italy)

Kispest-Honvéd won 2–0 on aggregate.

22 August 1996
20:00

Union Luxembourg	0–3	(Croatia) Varteks
	Lineups	Besek 64'; Mumlek 77'; Cvetko 87'

Stade Achille Hammerel, Luxembourg
Attendance: 490
Referee: Roland Beck (Liechtenstein)

Varteks won 5–1 on aggregate.

22 August 1996
18:00

Vaduz (Liechtenstein)	1–1 (a.e.t.)	(Latvia) Universitāte Rīga
Polverino 89'	Lineups	Zariņš 48'
Penalties
Müller (penalty scored); Polverino (penalty scored); Weber (penalty scored); Heeb (penalty scored)	4–2	(penalty missed) Draguns; (penalty missed) Zariņš; (penalty scored) Mastyanica; (penalty scored) Dolgopolovs

Gemeindesportplatz, Vaduz
Attendance: 1,100
Referee: Krsto Danilovski (Macedonia)

2–2 on aggregate. Vaduz won 4–2 on penalties.

22 August 1996
20:15

Sparta Prague (Czech Republic)	8–0	(Northern Ireland) Glentoran
Gunda 1', 25'; Mistr 19'; Siegl 24', 48', 80'; Z. Svoboda 77'; Gabriel 86'	Lineups

Stadion Letná, Prague
Attendance: 5,391
Referee: Miroslav Radoman (FR Yugoslavia)

Sparta Prague won 10–1 on aggregate.

22 August 1996
18:00

HB Tórshavn (Faroe Islands)	0–3	(Georgia (country)) Dinamo Batumi
	Lineups	Ghlonti 20', 21'; Ujmajuridze 63'

Svangaskarð, Toftir
Attendance: 300
Referee: Juha Pulkkinen (Finland)

Dinamo Batumi won 9–0 on aggregate.

22 August 1996
17:00

Nyva Vinnytsia (Ukraine)	1–0	(Estonia) Tallinna Sadam
Romanchuk 66'	Lineups

Tsentralnyi Stadion, Vinnytsia
Attendance: 12,000
Referee: Slavik Kazaryan (Armenia)

2–2 on aggregate. Nyva Vinnytsia won on away goals.

22 August 1996
16:30

Flamurtari Vlorë (Albania)	0–2	(Slovakia) Chemlon Humenné
	Lineups	Lyubarskyi 48'; Valkučák 53'

Qemal Stafa Stadium, Tirana
Attendance: 4,500
Referee: Attila Juhos (Hungary)

Chemlon Hummené won 3–0 on aggregate.

22 August 1996
18:00

Kareda Šiauliai (Lithuania)	0–0	(Switzerland) Sion
	Lineups

Savivaldybė Stadium, Šiauliai
Attendance: 2,500
Referee: Lars Gerner (Denmark)

Sion won 4–2 on aggregate.

22 August 1996
20:00

Levski Sofia (Bulgaria)	1–0 (a.e.t.)	(Slovenia) Olimpija Ljubljana
Simeonov 58'	Lineups
Penalties
Zaytsev (penalty missed); Yonkov (penalty scored); Todorov (penalty missed); Simeonov (penalty scored)	2–4	(penalty scored) Bozgo; (penalty scored) Ačimovič; (penalty scored) Velkoski; (penalty missed) Djuranović; (penalty scored) Gajser

Stadion Georgi Asparuhov, Sofia
Attendance: 12,000
Referee: Bohdan Benedik (Slovakia)

1–1 on aggregate. Olimpija Ljubljana won 4–2 on penalties.

22 August 1996
19:30

Heart of Midlothian (Scotland)	1–1	(Federal Republic of Yugoslavia) Red Star Belgrade
McPherson 45'	Lineups	Marinović 59'

Tynecastle Stadium, Edinburgh
Attendance: 15,062
Referee: Karl-Erik Nilsson (Sweden)

1–1 on aggregate. Red Star Belgrade won on away goals.

22 August 1996
20:00

MyPa (Finland)	1–1 (a.e.t.)	(Azerbaijan) Qarabağ
Keskitalo 119'	Lineups	Musayev 27'

Saviniemen jalkapallostadion, Anjalankoski
Attendance: 2,326
Referee: Terje Hauge (Norway)

MyPa won 2–1 on aggregate.

22 August 1996
17:00

AEK Larnaca (Cyprus)	5–0	(Armenia) Kotayk Abovyan
Kuntić 28'; Alexandrou 42'; Kovačević 60' (pen.); Kopunović 81'; Markou 84'	Lineups

GSZ Stadium, Larnaca
Attendance: 2,037
Referee: Amit Klein (Israel)

AEK Larnaca won 5–1 on aggregate.

22 August 1996
19:00

Hapoel Ironi Rishon LeZion (Israel)	3–2	(Moldova) Constructorul Chişinău
Sabag 9'; Kapeta 26'; Cebula 57'	Lineups	Rogaciov 42'; Skydan 86'

Municipal Stadium, Rishon LeZion
Attendance: 1,500
Referee: Juan Ansuátegui Roca (Spain)

3–3 on aggregate. Constructorul Chişinău won on away goals.

22 August 1996
17:00

Gloria Bistrița (Romania)	2–1	(Malta) Valletta
Lazăr 33'; Voica 83'	Lineups	J. Agius 23'

Stadionul Municipal Gloria, Bistrița
Attendance: 2,060
Referee: Jiří Ulrich (Czech Republic)

Gloria Bistrița won 4–2 on aggregate.

== First round ==
Team 1	Agg.	Team 2	1st leg	2nd leg
Nîmes Olympique (France)	5–2	(Hungary) Kispest-Honvéd	3–1	2–1
Sturm Graz (Austria)	3–3 (a)	(Czech Republic) Sparta Prague	2–2	1–1
Barcelona (Spain)	2–0	(Cyprus) AEK Larnaca	2–0	0–0
Constructorul Chişinău (Moldova)	0–5	(Turkey) Galatasaray	0–1	0–4
Kaiserslautern (Germany)	1–4	(Federal Republic of Yugoslavia) Red Star Belgrade	1–0	0–4 (aet)
MyPa (Finland)	1–4	(England) Liverpool	0–1	1–3
Sion (Switzerland)	6–0	(Ukraine) Nyva Vinnytsia	2–0	4–0
AGF (Denmark)	1–1 (a)	(Slovenia) Olimpija Ljubljana	1–1	0–0
Cercle Brugge (Belgium)	3–6	(Norway) Brann	3–2	0–4
KR (Iceland)	1–2	(Sweden) AIK	0–1	1–1
Benfica (Portugal)	5–1	(Poland) Ruch Chorzów	5–1	0–0
AEK Athens (Greece)	3–1	(Slovakia) Chemlon Humenné	1–0	2–1
Gloria Bistrița (Romania)	1–2	(Italy) Fiorentina	1–1	0–1
Dinamo Batumi (Georgia (country))	1–4	(Netherlands) PSV Eindhoven	1–1	0–3
Vaduz (Liechtenstein)	0–7	(France) Paris Saint-Germain	0–4	0–3
Lokomotiv Moscow (Russia)	2–2 (a)	(Croatia) Varteks	1–0	1–2

=== First leg ===
12 September 1996
20:30

Nîmes Olympique (France)	3–1	(Hungary) Kispest-Honvéd
Jeunechamp 65'; Préget 75'; Meilhac 86'	Lineups	Tóth 70'

Stade des Costières, Nîmes
Attendance: 7,948
Referee: Richard O'Hanlon (Republic of Ireland)

12 September 1996
20:30

Sturm Graz (Austria)	2–2	(Czech Republic) Sparta Prague
Vastić 8'; Mählich 85'	Lineups	Řepka 57'; Lokvenc 72'

Gruabn, Graz
Attendance: 3,208
Referee: Karl-Erik Nilsson (Sweden)

12 September 1996
21:30

Barcelona (Spain)	2–0	(Cyprus) AEK Larnaca
Ronaldo 19', 77'	Lineups

Estadi Olímpic de Montjuïc, Barcelona
Attendance: 35,000
Referee: Roland Beck (Liechtenstein)

12 September 1996
19:00

Constructorul Chişinău (Moldova)	0–1	(Turkey) Galatasaray
	Lineups	Knup 73'

Stadionul Republican, Chișinău
Attendance: 1,841
Referee: Kostadin Gerginov (Bulgaria)

12 September 1996
20:30

Kaiserslautern (Germany)	1–0	(Federal Republic of Yugoslavia) Red Star Belgrade
Wegmann 59'	Lineups

Fritz-Walter-Stadion, Kaiserslautern
Attendance: 25,719
Referee: Kenny Clarke (Scotland)

12 September 1996
20:00

MyPa (Finland)	0–1	(England) Liverpool
	Lineups	Bjørnebye 61'

Saviniemen jalkapallostadion, Anjalankoski
Attendance: 4,767
Referee: Gylfi Orrason (Iceland)

12 September 1996
20:00

Sion (Switzerland)	2–0	(Ukraine) Nyva Vinnytsia
Colombo 50'; Bonvin 82'	Lineups

Stade de Tourbillon, Sion
Attendance: 6,500
Referee: Andreas Georgiou (Cyprus)

12 September 1996
19:30

AGF (Denmark)	1–1	(Slovenia) Olimpija Ljubljana
Bak 15'	Lineups	Bozgo 57'

Aarhus Idrætspark, Århus
Attendance: 5,950
Referee: Mikko Vuorela (Finland)

12 September 1996
20:00

Cercle Brugge (Belgium)	3–2	(Norway) Brann
Gernsøe 5'; Van Maele 26'; Camerman 31'	Lineups	Flo 38'; Eftevaag 89' (pen.)

Olympiastadion, Bruges
Attendance: 4,500
Referee: John Ashman (Wales)

12 September 1996
19:00

KR (Iceland)	0–1	(Sweden) AIK
	Lineups	Nordin 78'

Laugardalsvöllur, Reykjavík
Attendance: 2,707
Referee: Tore Hollung (Norway)

12 September 1996
21:30

Benfica (Portugal)	5–1	(Poland) Ruch Chorzów
Donizete Pantera 24'; João Pinto 26'; Jamir 31'; Valdo 68', 90'	Lineups	Gęsior 71'

Estádio da Luz, Lisbon
Attendance: 17,000
Referee: Hermann Albrecht (Germany)

12 September 1996
21:15

AEK Athens (Greece)	1–0	(Slovakia) Chemlon Humenné
Batista 48'	Lineups

Nikos Goumas Stadium, Athens
Attendance: 15,141
Referee: Yuri Chebotaryov (Russia)

12 September 1996
21:00

Gloria Bistrița (Romania)	1–1	(Italy) Fiorentina
Lazăr 3'	Lineups	Batistuta 47'

Stadionul Municipal Gloria, Bistrița
Attendance: 10,000
Referee: Christer Fällström (Sweden)

12 September 1996
21:00

Dinamo Batumi (Georgia (country))	1–1	(Netherlands) PSV Eindhoven
Mujiri 21'	Lineups	Nilis 40' (pen.)

Central Stadium, Batumi
Attendance: 14,000
Referee: Kurt Zuppinger (Switzerland)

12 September 1996
17:00

Vaduz (Liechtenstein)	0–4	(France) Paris Saint-Germain
	Lineups	Le Guen 13'; Dely Valdés 41'; Leonardo 45'; Allou 72'

Gemeindesportplatz, Vaduz
Attendance: 3,900
Referee: Romāns Lajuks (Latvia)

12 September 1996
19:30

Lokomotiv Moscow (Russia)	1–0	(Croatia) Varteks
Cherevchenko 12'	Lineups

Lokomotiv Stadium, Moscow
Attendance: 760
Referee: Jacek Granat (Poland)

=== Second leg ===
26 September 1996
20:45

Kispest-Honvéd (Hungary)	1–2	(France) Nîmes Olympique
Piroska 61'	Lineups	Ecker 6'; Sabin 38'

Bozsik József Stadion, Budapest
Attendance: 3,645
Referee: Vladimir Antonov (Moldova)

Nîmes Olympique won 5–2 on aggregate.

26 September 1996
20:20

Sparta Prague (Czech Republic)	1–1	(Austria) Sturm Graz
Horňák 86'	Lineups	Novotný 77' (o.g.)

Stadion Letná, Prague
Attendance: 5,643
Referee: Juan Fernández Marín (Spain)

3–3 on aggregate. Sparta Prague won on away goals.

26 September 1996
20:15

AEK Larnaca (Cyprus)	0–0	(Spain) Barcelona
	Lineups

GSZ Stadium, Larnaca
Attendance: 6,000
Referee: Claude Colombo (France)

Barcelona won 2–0 on aggregate.

26 September 1996
20:00

Galatasaray (Turkey)	4–0	(Moldova) Constructorul Chișinău
Şükür 49', 80'; Arif 73'; Hagi 75'	Lineups

Ali Sami Yen Stadium, Istanbul
Attendance: 16,695
Referee: Miroslav Radoman (FR Yugoslavia)

Galatasaray won 5–0 on aggregate.

26 September 1996
20:30

Red Star Belgrade (Federal Republic of Yugoslavia)	4–0 (a.e.t.)	(Germany) Kaiserslautern
D. Stanković 55', 97'; Njeguš 107'; Pantelić 120'	Lineups

Red Star Stadium, Belgrade
Attendance: 42,568
Referee: Éric Blareau (Belgium)

Red Star Belgrade won 4–1 on aggregate.

26 September 1996
19:45

Liverpool (England)	3–1	(Finland) MyPa
Berger 18'; Collymore 59'; Barnes 78'	Lineups	Keskitalo 64'

Anfield, Liverpool
Attendance: 39,013
Referee: Syarhey Shmolik (Belarus)

Liverpool won 4–1 on aggregate.

26 September 1996
16:00

Nyva Vinnytsia (Ukraine)	0–4	(Switzerland) Sion
	Lineups	Lukić 2'; Vercruysse 9', 68'; Milton 54'

Tsentralnyi Stadion, Vinnytsia
Attendance: 12,000
Referee: Manfred Schüttengruber (Austria)

Sion won 6–0 on aggregate.

26 September 1996
20:00

Olimpija Ljubljana (Slovenia)	0–0	(Denmark) AGF
	Lineups

Stadion Bežigrad, Ljubljana
Attendance: 1,433
Referee: Sotiris Vorgias (Greece)

1–1 on aggregate. Olimpija Ljubljana won on away goals.

26 September 1996
20:00

Brann (Norway)	4–0	(Belgium) Cercle Brugge
Mjelde 5', 80'; Eftevaag 78'; Helland 86'	Lineups

Brann Stadion, Bergen
Attendance: 6,104
Referee: Valeriy Onufer (Ukraine)

Brann won 6–3 on aggregate.

26 September 1996
19:00

AIK (Sweden)	1–1	(Iceland) KR
Simpson 79'	Lineups	Benediktsson 87'

Råsunda Fotbollsstadion, Solna
Attendance: 3,267
Referee: Stephen Lodge (England)

AIK won 2–1 on aggregate.

26 September 1996
20:00

Ruch Chorzów (Poland)	0–0	(Portugal) Benfica
	Lineups

Ruch Chorzów Stadium, Chorzów
Attendance: 4,547
Referee: Mika Peltola (Finland)

Benfica won 5–1 on aggregate.

26 September 1996
15:30

Chemlon Humenné (Slovakia)	1–2	(Greece) AEK Athens
Diňa 1'	Lineups	Nikolaidis 17'; Batista 44'

Chemlonský štadión, Humenné
Attendance: 14,600
Referee: Mateo Beusan (Croatia)

AEK Athens won 3–1 on aggregate.

26 September 1996
20:30

Fiorentina (Italy)	1–0	(Romania) Gloria Bistrița
Orlando 23'	Lineups

Stadio Artemio Franchi, Florence
Attendance: 18,607
Referee: Ladislav Gádoši (Slovakia)

Fiorentina won 2–1 on aggregate.

26 September 1996
20:30

PSV Eindhoven (Netherlands)	3–0	(Georgia (country)) Dinamo Batumi
Nilis 15' (pen.); Eijkelkamp 57'; Marcelo Ramos 86'	Lineups

Philips Stadion, Eindhoven
Attendance: 14,200
Referee: Stuart Dougal (Scotland)

PSV Eindhoven won 4–1 on aggregate.

26 September 1996
20:45

Paris Saint-Germain (France)	3–0	(Liechtenstein) Vaduz
Allou 22'; Roche 40'; Mboma 50'	Lineups

Parc des Princes, Paris
Attendance: 15,973
Referee: Bujar Pregja (Albania)

Paris Saint-Germain won 7–0 on aggregate.

26 September 1996
16:00

Varteks (Croatia)	2–1	(Russia) Lokomotiv Moscow
Vugrinec 62', 79'	Lineups	Kosolapov 41'

Stadion Varteks, Varaždin
Attendance: 8,500
Referee: Georg Dardenne (Germany)

2–2 on aggregate. Lokomotiv Moscow won on away goals.

== Second round ==
Team 1	Agg.	Team 2	1st leg	2nd leg
Sion (Switzerland)	4–8	(England) Liverpool	1–2	3–6
Nîmes Olympique (France)	2–3	(Sweden) AIK	1–3	1–0
Fiorentina (Italy)	3–2	(Czech Republic) Sparta Prague	2–1	1–1
Olimpija Ljubljana (Slovenia)	0–6	(Greece) AEK Athens	0–2	0–4
Brann (Norway)	4–3	(Netherlands) PSV Eindhoven	2–1	2–2
Barcelona (Spain)	4–2	(Federal Republic of Yugoslavia) Red Star Belgrade	3–1	1–1
Benfica (Portugal)	4–2	(Russia) Lokomotiv Moscow	1–0	3–2
Galatasaray (Turkey)	4–6	(France) Paris Saint-Germain	4–2	0–4

=== First leg ===
17 October 1996
20:00

Sion (Switzerland)	1–2	(England) Liverpool
Bonvin 11'	Lineups	Fowler 24'; Barnes 60'

Stade de Tourbillon, Sion
Attendance: 16,500
Referee: Antonio López Nieto (Spain)

17 October 1996
17:00

Nîmes Olympique (France)	1–3	(Sweden) AIK
Fidani 88'	Lineups	Simpson 9'; Pachà 12'; M. Johansson 70'

Stade des Costières, Nîmes
Attendance: 15,049
Referee: Leslie Irvine (Northern Ireland)

17 October 1996
20:45

Fiorentina (Italy)	2–1	(Czech Republic) Sparta Prague
Batistuta 5'; Schwarz 56'	Lineups	Siegl 80'

Stadio Artemio Franchi, Florence
Attendance: 22,400
Referee: Serge Muhmenthaler (Switzerland)

17 October 1996
18:00

Olimpija Ljubljana (Slovenia)	0–2	(Greece) AEK Athens
	Lineups	Kostis 12'; Ketsbaia 49'

Stadion Bežigrad, Ljubljana
Attendance: 1,473
Referee: Atanas Uzunov (Bulgaria)

17 October 1996
20:00

Brann (Norway)	2–1	(Netherlands) PSV Eindhoven
Mjelde 29', 34' (pen.)	Lineups	Cocu 90'

Brann Stadion, Bergen
Attendance: 7,842
Referee: Alain Hamer (Luxembourg)

17 October 1996
21:00

Barcelona (Spain)	3–1	(Federal Republic of Yugoslavia) Red Star Belgrade
Giovanni 34', 36'; Figo 54'	Lineups	Živković 21'

Camp Nou, Barcelona
Attendance: 73,000
Referee: Rémi Harrel (France)

17 October 1996
21:00

Benfica (Portugal)	1–0	(Russia) Lokomotiv Moscow
João Pinto 8'	Lineups

Estádio da Luz, Lisbon
Attendance: 8,090
Referee: Alain Sars (France)

17 October 1996
20:30

Galatasaray (Turkey)	4–2	(France) Paris Saint-Germain
Şükür 5', 31'; Tugay 13'; Ünsal 53'	Lineups	Le Guen 18'; Dely Valdés 19'

Ali Sami Yen Stadium, Istanbul
Attendance: 25,627
Referee: Pierluigi Collina (Italy)

=== Second leg ===
31 October 1996
20:45

Liverpool (England)	6–3	(Switzerland) Sion
McManaman 28'; Bjørnebye 54'; Barnes 65'; Fowler 71', 72'; Berger 90'	Lineups	Chassot 19', 64'; Bonvin 23'

Anfield, Liverpool
Attendance: 38,514
Referee: Hartmut Strampe (Germany)

Liverpool won 8–4 on aggregate.

31 October 1996
18:00

AIK (Sweden)	0–1	(France) Nîmes Olympique
	Lineups	Brundin 69' (o.g.)

Råsunda Fotbollsstadion, Solna
Attendance: 5,620
Referee: Ľuboš Micheľ (Slovakia)

AIK won 3–2 on aggregate.

31 October 1996
20:45

Sparta Prague (Czech Republic)	1–1	(Italy) Fiorentina
Lokvenc 5'	Lineups	Robbiati 63'

Stadion Letná, Prague
Attendance: 16,021
Referee: David Elleray (England)

Fiorentina won 3–2 on aggregate.

31 October 1996
21:00

AEK Athens (Greece)	4–0	(Slovenia) Olimpija Ljubljana
Savevski 4' (pen.); Batista 20'; Maladenis 80'; Kostis 85'	Lineups

Nikos Goumas Stadium, Athens
Attendance: 14,482
Referee: Hermann Albrecht (Germany)

AEK Athens won 6–0 on aggregate.

31 October 1996
20:30

PSV Eindhoven (Netherlands)	2–2	(Norway) Brann
Eijkelkamp 75'; Zenden 82'	Lineups	Hasund 35'; Flo 60'

Philips Stadion, Eindhoven
Attendance: 19,000
Referee: Philippe Leduc (France)

Brann won 4–3 on aggregate.

31 October 1996
20:30

Red Star Belgrade (Federal Republic of Yugoslavia)	1–1	(Spain) Barcelona
Jovičić 47'	Lineups	Giovanni 48'

Red Star Stadium, Belgrade
Attendance: 44,694
Referee: Gerd Grabher (Austria)

Barcelona won 4–2 on aggregate.

31 October 1996
20:00

Lokomotiv Moscow (Russia)	2–3	(Portugal) Benfica
Solomatin 9'; Haras 59'	Lineups	Panduru 48'; Donizete Pantera 63'; João Pinto 89'

Lokomotiv Stadium, Moscow
Attendance: 6,500
Referee: Knud Erik Fisker (Denmark)

Benfica won 4–2 on aggregate.

31 October 1996
20:45

Paris Saint-Germain (France)	4–0	(Turkey) Galatasaray
Leonardo 10'; Dely Valdés 23'; Loko 59'; Raí 78'	Lineups

Parc des Princes, Paris
Attendance: 34,032
Referee: Karol Ihring (Slovakia)

Paris Saint-Germain won 6–4 on aggregate.

== Quarter-finals ==
Team 1	Agg.	Team 2	1st leg	2nd leg
Benfica (Portugal)	1–2	(Italy) Fiorentina	0–2	1–0
Paris Saint-Germain (France)	3–0	(Greece) AEK Athens	0–0	3–0
Brann (Norway)	1–4	(England) Liverpool	1–1	0–3
Barcelona (Spain)	4–2	(Sweden) AIK	3–1	1–1

=== First leg ===
6 March 1997
19:45

Benfica (Portugal)	0–2	(Italy) Fiorentina
	Lineups	Baiano 45'; Batistuta 90'

Estádio da Luz, Lisbon
Attendance: 32,632
Referee: Hellmut Krug (Germany)

6 March 1997
20:30

Paris Saint-Germain (France)	0–0	(Greece) AEK Athens
	Lineups

Parc des Princes, Paris
Attendance: 21,952
Referee: Urs Meier (Switzerland)

6 March 1997
20:15

Brann (Norway)	1–1	(England) Liverpool
Hasund 48'	Lineups	Fowler 10'

Brann Stadion, Bergen
Attendance: 12,700
Referee: Nikolai Levnikov (Russia)

6 March 1997
21:00

Barcelona (Spain)	3–1	(Sweden) AIK
Popescu 2'; Ronaldo 55'; Pizzi 81'	Lineups	Simpson 1'

Camp Nou, Barcelona
Attendance: 57,300
Referee: David Elleray (England)

=== Second leg ===
20 March 1997
20:45

Fiorentina (Italy)	0–1	(Portugal) Benfica
	Lineups	Edgar 22'

Stadio Artemio Franchi, Florence
Attendance: 35,071
Referee: Mario van der Ende (Netherlands)

Fiorentina won 2–1 on aggregate.

20 March 1997
21:15

AEK Athens (Greece)	0–3	(France) Paris Saint-Germain
	Lineups	Loko 22', 44', 81'

Nikos Goumas Stadium, Athens
Attendance: 27,200
Referee: Antonio López Nieto (Spain)

Paris Saint-Germain won 3–0 on aggregate.

20 March 1997
19:45

Liverpool (England)	3–0	(Norway) Brann
Fowler 26' (pen.), 77'; Collymore 60'	Lineups

Anfield, Liverpool
Attendance: 40,326
Referee: Alfredo Trentalange (Italy)

Liverpool won 4–1 on aggregate.

20 March 1997
20:30

AIK (Sweden)	1–1	(Spain) Barcelona
Simpson 73'	Lineups	Ronaldo 12'

Råsunda Fotbollsstadion, Solna
Attendance: 35,049
Referee: Gilles Veissière (France)

Barcelona won 4–2 on aggregate.

== Semi-finals ==
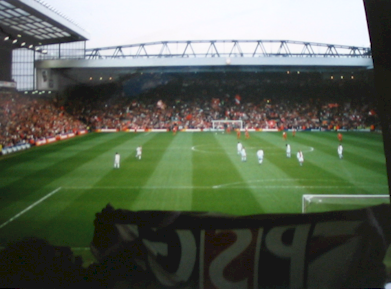
Paris SG halted Liverpool's progress at the semi-final stage.

Team 1	Agg.	Team 2	1st leg	2nd leg
Barcelona (Spain)	3–1	(Italy) Fiorentina	1–1	2–0
Paris Saint-Germain (France)	3–2	(England) Liverpool	3–0	0–2

=== First leg ===
10 April 1997
21:30

Barcelona (Spain)	1–1	(Italy) Fiorentina
Nadal 42'	Lineups	Batistuta 62'

Camp Nou, Barcelona
Attendance: 87,000
Referee: Bernd Heynemann (Germany)

10 April 1997
20:45

Paris Saint-Germain (France)	3–0	(England) Liverpool
Leonardo 11'; Cauet 43'; Leroy 83'	Lineups

Parc des Princes, Paris
Attendance: 35,142
Referee: Hellmut Krug (Germany)

=== Second leg ===
24 April 1997
20:45

Fiorentina (Italy)	0–2	(Spain) Barcelona
	Lineups	Couto 30'; Guardiola 35'

Stadio Artemio Franchi, Florence
Attendance: 43,588
Referee: Anders Frisk (Sweden)

After Barcelona's second goal, Iván de la Peña of Barcelona was hit by an object thrown from the stands and required medical assistance. As a result, Fiorentina received a two-match European competition stadium ban, enforced at the start of their 1998–99 UEFA Cup campaign.

Barcelona won 3–1 on aggregate.

24 April 1997
19:30

Liverpool (England)	2–0	(France) Paris Saint-Germain
Fowler 12'; Wright 80'	Lineups

Anfield, Liverpool
Attendance: 38,948
Referee: Rune Pedersen (Norway)

Paris Saint-Germain won 3–2 on aggregate.

== Final ==
14 May 1997
20:30

Barcelona (Spain)	1–0	(France) Paris Saint-Germain
Ronaldo 37' (pen.)	Lineups

De Kuip, Rotterdam
Attendance: 36,802
Referee: Markus Merk (Germany)

== Top scorers ==
The top scorers from the 1996–97 UEFA Cup Winners' Cup are as follows:

Rank	Name	Team	Goals
1	(England) Robbie Fowler	(England) Liverpool	7
2	(Norway) Mons Ivar Mjelde	(Norway) Brann	6
3	(Brazil) Ronaldo	(Spain) Barcelona	5
3	(Czech Republic) Horst Siegl	(Czech Republic) Sparta Prague	5
5	(Argentina) Gabriel Batistuta	(Italy) Fiorentina	4
5	(Switzerland) Christophe Bonvin	(Switzerland) Sion	4
5	(France) Patrice Loko	(France) Paris Saint-Germain	4
5	(Sweden) Pascal Simpson	(Sweden) AIK	4
5	(Turkey) Hakan Şükür	(Turkey) Galatasaray	4
10	(England) John Barnes	(England) Liverpool	3
10	(Greece) Daniel Batista	(Greece) AEK Athens	3
10	(Switzerland) Frédéric Chassot	(Switzerland) Sion	3
10	(Panama) Julio Dely Valdés	(France) Paris Saint-Germain	3
10	(Norway) Claus Eftevaag	(Norway) Brann	3
10	(Brazil) Giovanni	(Spain) Barcelona	3
10	(Portugal) João Pinto	(Portugal) Benfica	3
10	(Brazil) Leonardo	(France) Paris Saint-Germain	3
10	(Czech Republic) Vratislav Lokvenc	(Czech Republic) Sparta Prague	3
10	(Georgia (country)) Temur Tugushi	(Georgia (country)) Dinamo Batumi	3
10	(Georgia (country)) David Ujmajuridze	(Georgia (country)) Dinamo Batumi	3
10	(France) Philippe Vercruysse	(Switzerland) Sion	3

== See also ==
- 1996–97 UEFA Champions League
- 1996–97 UEFA Cup
- 1996 UEFA Intertoto Cup
