= 1995–96 Slovak Cup =

Tournament details
- Country: Slovakia
- Teams: 32

Final positions
- Champions: Chemlon Humenné
- Runners-up: Spartak Trnava

The 1995–96 Slovak Cup was the 27th season of Slovakia's annual knock-out cup competition and the third since the independence of Slovakia. It began on 19 September 1995 with the matches of first round and ended on 26 May 1996 with the final. The winners of the competition earned a place in the qualifying round of the UEFA Cup Winners' Cup. Inter Bratislava were the defending champions.

== First round ==
The games were played on 19, 20 and 26 September and on 17 and 18 October 1995.

Team 1	Score	Team 2
PFK Piešťany	0–0 (4–3 p)	FC Nitra
Chemlon Humenné	4–0	Tesla Stropkov
SCP Ružomberok	2–4	BSC JAS Bardejov
Rimavská Sobota	2–0	Tatran Prešov
Slovan Levice	4–0	ŠK Svätý Jur
DAC Dunajská Streda	2–0	FC Vráble
ŠK Selce	1–1 (4–3 p)	1. FC Košice
Lokomotíva Košice	1–1 (2–3 p)	Matador Púchov
Spartak ZŤS Dubnica	2–1	Artmedia Petržalka
ŠM Gabčíkovo	6–1	Juhcelpap Štúrovo
MŠK Žilina	1–0	Kalcit Rožňava
SEZ Krompachy	2–3	Dukla Banská Bystrica
Spartak Trnava	6–2	Ozeta Dukla Trenčín
MFK Petrimex Prievidza	1–1 (6–7 p)	Slavoj Trebišov
Slovan Bratislava	5–0	Tatran Devín
ŠKP Bratislava	0–3	Inter Bratislava

Sources: , , , ,

== Second round ==
The games were played on 24 October 1995.

Team 1	Score	Team 2
Rimavská Sobota	4–1	DAC Dunajská Streda
ŠM Gabčíkovo	2–0	Inter Bratislava
Slavoj Trebišov	1–1 (3–1 p)	Slovan Bratislava
Spartak ZŤS Dubnica	0–3	Spartak Trnava
Slovan Levice	2–1	BSC JAS Bardejov
ŠK Selce	0–2	Dukla Banská Bystrica
PFK Piešťany	1–5	Chemlon Humenné
Matador Púchov	0–0 (3–1 p)	MŠK Žilina

== Quarter-finals ==
The games were played on 2 and 3 April 1996.

2 April 1996	Dukla Banská Bystrica	7–0	ŠM Gabčíkovo	Banská Bystrica
	Ovad 25'; Strelec 47' (pen.); Slobodník 53'; Babnič 64'; Toman 69'; Ma. Bažík 76', 83'	Report		Stadium: Štadión SNP Štiavničky; Attendance: 120; Referee: Jozef Ligocký

2 April 1996	Spartak Trnava	2–1	Slavoj Trebišov	Trnava
	Mačák 34'; Kostka 56'	Report	Wikarski 46'	Stadium: Anton Malatinský Stadium; Attendance: 12,000; Referee: Bohdan Benedik

2 April 1996	Slovan Levice	0–2	Chemlon Humenné	Levice
		Report	Lyubarskyi 45' (pen.); Valkučák 47'	Stadium: Futbalový štadión Levice; Attendance: 2,000; Referee: Ladislav Gádoši

3 April 1996	Rimavská Sobota	2–0	Matador Púchov	Rimavská Sobota
	Pisár 36', 52'	Report		Stadium: Na Záhradkách Stadium; Attendance: 2,000; Referee: Vladimír Hriňák

== Semi-finals ==
The first legs were played on 9 April 1996. The second legs were played on 1 May 1996.

=== First legs ===
9 April 1996	Dukla Banská Bystrica	1–0	Spartak Trnava	Banská Bystrica
	Toman 30' (pen.)	Report		Stadium: Štadión SNP Štiavničky; Attendance: 2,400; Referee: Vladimír Hriňák

9 April 1996	Chemlon Humenné	4–0	Rimavská Sobota	Humenné
	Lyubarskyi 37', 64' (pen.); Hanc 6'; Mati 58'	Report		Stadium: Štadión Humenné; Attendance: 3,500; Referee: Karol Zvolánek

=== Second legs ===
1 May 1996	Spartak Trnava	3–1 (3–2 agg.)	Dukla Banská Bystrica	Trnava
	Kostka 19'; Šimon 52' (pen.); Mačák 57'	Report	Toman 15'	Stadium: Anton Malatinský Stadium; Attendance: 12,000; Referee: Ľuboš Micheľ

1 May 1996	Rimavská Sobota	1–1 (1–5 agg.)	Chemlon Humenné	Rimavská Sobota
	Pisár 64'	Report 1 Report 2	Lyubarskyi 82'	Stadium: Na Záhradkách Stadium; Attendance: 3,500; Referee: Anton Stredák

== Final ==
26 May 1996
17:00 CEST

Spartak Trnava	1–2	Chemlon Humenné
Formanko 78'	Report	Lyubarskyi 54'; Mati 65'

Štadión Bukóza, Vranov nad Topľou
Attendance: 9,000
Referee: Karol Ihring
