= Antti Kuismala =

Finnish footballer (born 1976)

Personal information
- Full name: Antti Matias Kuismala
- Date of birth: 20 January 1976 (age 50)
- Place of birth: Ristiina, Finland
- Height: 1.88 m (6 ft 2 in)
- Position: Goalkeeper

Senior career*
Years	Team	Apps	(Gls)
1996–1997	MP	39	(0)
1998	Jazz	14	(0)
1999	Mikkeli	27	(0)
2000	TPV	25	(0)
2001–2003	Jaro	74	(0)
2004	Tromsø	0	(0)
2005	TP-Seinäjoki	8	(0)
2005–2007	IFK Mariehamn	48	(0)
2008	MP	7	(0)
2009–2012	MyPa	82	(0)
2011	→ MP (loan)	3	(0)
2013–2015	MP	76	(0)
Total		378	(0)
- * Club domestic league appearances and goals as of 18 October 2015

Antti Kuismala (born 20 January 1976) is a Finnish former footballer.

== Personal life ==
His son Joona is also a footballer.
