= AEK Larnaca FC in European football =

The Cypriot football club AEK Larnaca FC has taken part in various European competitions over the years, notably taking part in the UEFA Cup Winners' Cup in 1996–97, reaching the group stages of the UEFA Europa League in 2011–12, 2018–19, and 2022–23, and reaching the Round of 16 of the UEFA Conference League in 2025–26.

== All time statistics ==
As of match played 19 March 2026

Competition	S	Pld	W	D	L	GF	GA	GD
UEFA Champions League	1	2	0	2	0	2	2	0
UEFA Cup Winners' Cup / European Cup Winners' Cup	1	4	1	1	2	5	3	+2
UEFA Europa League / UEFA Cup	9	68	31	17	20	106	79	+27
UEFA Europa Conference League / Conference League	4	18	5	7	6	14	19	−5
Total	15	92	37	27	28	127	103	+24

== Opponents ==
As of match played 19 March 2026

Country	Club	Pld	W	D	L	GF	GA	GD
Armenia	Kotayk Abovian	2	1	0	1	5	1	+4
Subtotal		2	1	0	1	5	1	+4
Austria	Sturm Graz	2	2	0	0	7	0	+7
Subtotal		2	2	0	0	7	0	+7
Belarus	Dinamo Minsk	2	1	1	0	3	1	+2
Belarus	Torpedo-BelAZ Zhodino	2	1	1	0	4	3	+1
Subtotal		4	2	2	0	7	4	+3
Belgium	Gent	2	0	1	1	1	4	+3
Subtotal		2	0	1	1	1	4	+3
Bulgaria	Ludogorets Razgrad	2	0	2	0	1	1	0
Bulgaria	Levski Sofia	2	2	0	0	7	0	+7
Subtotal		4	2	2	0	8	1	+7
Croatia	Rijeka	1	0	1	0	0	0	0
Subtotal		1	0	1	0	0	0	0
Czech Republic	Mladá Boleslav	2	1	1	0	5	2	+3
Czech Republic	Slovan Liberec	2	0	0	2	0	4	–4
Czech Republic	Viktoria Plzeň	2	0	1	1	1	3	–2
Subtotal		6	1	2	3	6	9	–3
Denmark	Midtjylland	2	0	2	0	2	2	0
Subtotal		2	0	2	0	2	2	0
England	Crystal Palace	3	1	1	1	2	2	0
England	West Ham United	2	0	0	2	0	6	–6
Subtotal		5	1	1	3	2	8	–6
France	Bordeaux	2	0	0	2	0	4	–4
France	Rennes	2	0	1	1	2	3	–1
Subtotal		4	0	1	3	2	7	–5
Germany	Bayer Leverkusen	2	0	0	2	3	9	–6
Germany	Schalke 04	2	0	1	1	0	5	–5
Subtotal		4	0	1	3	3	14	–11
Gibraltar	Lincoln Red Imps	2	1	1	0	6	1	+5
Subtotal		2	1	1	0	6	1	+5
Hungary	Paks	2	0	0	2	0	5	–5
Subtotal		2	0	0	2	0	5	–5
Israel	Maccabi Haifa	2	1	0	1	2	2	0
Israel	Maccabi Petah Tikva	2	1	0	1	3	4	–1
Israel	Maccabi Tel Aviv	2	0	1	1	1	2	–1
Subtotal		6	2	1	3	6	8	–2
Malta	Floriana	2	2	0	0	9	0	+9
Subtotal		2	2	0	0	9	0	+9
Moldova	Petrocub Hîncești	2	2	0	0	2	0	+2
Subtotal		2	2	0	0	2	0	+2
Netherlands	AZ	1	1	0	0	4	0	+4
Subtotal		1	1	0	0	4	0	+4
North Macedonia	Shkëndija	1	1	0	0	1	0	+1
Subtotal		1	1	0	0	1	0	+1
Northern Ireland	Cliftonville	2	2	0	0	5	2	+3
Subtotal		2	2	0	0	5	2	+3
Norway	Brann	2	0	0	2	1	6	–5
Norway	Rosenborg	2	1	1	0	2	1	+1
Subtotal		4	1	1	2	3	7	–4
Poland	Legia Warsaw	2	1	0	1	5	3	+2
Subtotal		2	1	0	1	5	3	+2
Republic of Ireland	Cork City	2	2	0	0	2	0	+2
Republic of Ireland	Dundalk	2	1	1	0	4	0	+4
Subtotal		4	3	1	0	6	0	+6
Romania	Steaua București	2	0	1	1	2	4	– 2
Subtotal		2	0	1	1	2	4	–2
Russia	Spartak Moscow	2	1	1	0	2	1	+1
Subtotal		2	1	1	0	2	1	+1
San Marino	Folgore	2	2	0	0	6	1	+5
Subtotal		2	2	0	0	6	1	+5
Scotland	Aberdeen	1	0	1	0	0	0	0
Subtotal		1	0	1	0	0	0	0
Serbia	Partizan	4	2	1	1	6	5	+1
Subtotal		4	2	1	1	6	5	+1
Slovakia	Trenčín	2	1	1	0	4	1	+3
Subtotal		2	1	1	0	4	1	+3
Slovenia	Celje	2	1	1	0	3	2	+1
Subtotal		2	1	1	0	3	2	+1
Spain	Barcelona	2	0	1	1	0	2	–2
Subtotal		2	0	1	1	0	2	–2
Sweden	BK Häcken	1	0	1	0	1	1	0
Subtotal		1	0	1	0	1	1	0
Switzerland	Zürich	2	1	0	1	2	2	0
Subtotal		2	1	0	1	2	2	0
Turkey	Fenerbahçe	2	0	0	2	1	4	–3
Subtotal		2	0	0	2	1	4	–3
Ukraine	Dnipro-1	4	3	1	0	6	1	+5
Ukraine	Dynamo Kyiv	2	1	1	0	4	3	+1
Subtotal		6	4	2	0	10	4	+6
Total		92	37	27	28	127	103	+24

== Competitions ==
=== UEFA Champions League ===
Including 2022–23 season

Season	Round	Country	Club	Home	Away	Aggregate
2022–23	Second qualifying round	Denmark	Midtjylland	1–1 (a.e.t.)	1–1	2–2 (3–4 p)

=== UEFA Cup Winners' Cup / European Cup Winners' Cup ===
Season	Round	Country	Club	Home	Away	Aggregate
1996–97	Qualifying round	Armenia	Kotayk Abovian	5–0	0–1	5–1
1996–97	First round	Spain	Barcelona	0–0	0–2	0–2

=== UEFA Europa League / UEFA Cup ===
Including 2025–26 season

Season	Round	Country	Club	Home	Away	Aggregate
2004–05	Second qualifying round	Israel	Maccabi Petah Tikva	3–0	0–4	3–4
2011–12	Second qualifying round	Malta	Floriana	1–0	8–0	9–0
2011–12	Third qualifying round	Czech Republic	Mladá Boleslav	3–0	2–2	5–2
2011–12	Play-off round	Norway	Rosenborg	2–1	0–0	2–1
2011–12	Group stage (J)	Israel	Maccabi Haifa	2–1	0–1	4th place
2011–12	Group stage (J)	Romania	Steaua București	1–1	1–3	4th place
2011–12	Group stage (J)	Germany	Schalke 04	0–5	0–0	4th place
2015–16	Third qualifying round	France	Bordeaux	0–1	0–3	0–4
2016–17	First qualifying round	San Marino	Folgore	3–0	3–1	6–1
2016–17	Second qualifying round	Northern Ireland	Cliftonville	2–0	3–2	5–2
2016–17	Third qualifying round	Russia	Spartak Moscow	1–1	1–0	2–1
2016–17	Play-off round	Czech Republic	Slovan Liberec	0–1	0–3	0–4
2017–18	First qualifying round	Gibraltar	Lincoln Red Imps	5–0	1–1	6–1
2017–18	Second qualifying round	(Republic of Ireland) Ireland	Cork City	1–0	1–0	2–0
2017–18	Third qualifying round	Belarus	Dinamo Minsk	2–0	1–1	3–1
2017–18	Play-off round	Czech Republic	Viktoria Plzeň	0–0	1–3	1–3
2018–19	Second qualifying round	(Republic of Ireland) Ireland	Dundalk	4–0	0–0	4–0
2018–19	Third qualifying round	Austria	Sturm Graz	5–0	2–0	7–0
2018–19	Play-off round	Slovakia	Trenčín	3–0	1–1	4–1
2018–19	Group stage (A)	Switzerland	Zürich	0–1	2–1	3rd place
2018–19	Group stage (A)	Germany	Bayer Leverkusen	1–5	2–4	3rd place
2018–19	Group stage (A)	Bulgaria	Ludogorets Razgrad	1–1	0–0	3rd place
2019–20	First qualifying round	Moldova	Petrocub Hîncești	1–0	1–0	2–0
2019–20	Second qualifying round	Bulgaria	Levski Sofia	3–0	4–0	7–0
2019–20	Third qualifying round	Belgium	Gent	1–1	0–3	1–4
2022–23	Third qualifying round	Serbia	Partizan	2–1	2–2	4–3
2022–23	Play-off round	Ukraine	Dnipro-1	3–0	2–1	5–1
2022–23	Group stage (B)	Ukraine	Dynamo Kyiv	3–3	1–0	3rd place
2022–23	Group stage (B)	France	Rennes	1–2	1–1	3rd place
2022–23	Group stage (B)	Turkey	Fenerbahçe	1–2	0–2	3rd place
2025–26	First qualifying round	Serbia	Partizan	1–0	1–2 (a.e.t.)	2–2 (6–5 p)
2025–26	Second qualifying round	Slovenia	Celje	2–1	1–1	3–2
2025–26	Third qualifying round	Poland	Legia Warsaw	4–1	1–2	5–3
2025–26	Play-off round	Norway	Brann	0–4	1–2	1–6

=== UEFA Conference League ===
Including 2025–26 season

Season	Round	Country	Club	Home	Away	Aggregate
2022–23	Knockout round play-offs	Ukraine	Dnipro-1	1–0	0–0	1–0
2022–23	Round of 16	England	West Ham United	0–2	0–4	0–6
2023–24	Second qualifying round	Belarus	Torpedo-BelAZ Zhodino	1–1	3–2	4–3
2023–24	Third qualifying round	Israel	Maccabi Tel Aviv	1–1	0–1	1–2
2024–25	Second qualifying round	Hungary	Paks	0–2	0–3	0–5
2025–26	League phase	Netherlands	AZ	4–0	—N/a	8th place
2025–26	League phase	England	Crystal Palace	—N/a	1–0	8th place
2025–26	League phase	Scotland	Aberdeen	0–0	—N/a	8th place
2025–26	League phase	Croatia	Rijeka	—N/a	0–0	8th place
2025–26	League phase	Sweden	BK Häcken	—N/a	1–1	8th place
2025–26	League phase	North Macedonia	Shkëndija	1–0	—N/a	8th place
2025–26	Round of 16	England	Crystal Palace	1–2 (a.e.t.)	0–0	1–2
