= Joona Kuismala =

Finnish footballer (born 2005)

Personal information
- Date of birth: 23 November 2005 (age 20)
- Place of birth: Finland
- Height: 1.86 m (6 ft 1 in)
- Position: Centre back

Team information
- Current team: MyPa

Youth career
- –2022: MP

Senior career*
Years	Team	Apps	(Gls)
2022	SavU	15	(0)
2023–2024	MP	23	(1)
2024	Elva	15	(1)
2025	MP	22	(0)
2026	MyPa	4	(1)

International career^{‡}
- Finland U18
2023–2024	Finland U19	3	(0)
2024–	Finland U21	1	(0)
- * Club domestic league appearances and goals as of 22 July 2026 ‡ National team caps and goals as of 9 June 2024

Joona Kuismala (born 23 November 2005) is a Finnish professional footballer who plays as a centre back.

== Personal life ==
His father Antti Kuismala is a former footballer and currently a youth coach for MP.
