= 1999–2000 Israeli Premier League =

Israeli Premier League
- Season: 1999–2000
- Champions: Hapoel Tel Aviv; 11th title
- Relegated: Hapoel Kfar Saba; Maccabi Herzliya; Hapoel Jerusalem
- Top goalscorer: Assi Tubi (27)

The 1999–2000 Israeli Premier League season was the first in its history. The league had been formed to replace the former top division, Liga Leumit, which became the country's second tier.

Before the season started promoted club was Maccabi Netanya. Ironi Ashdod and Liga Alef side Hapoel Ashdod were merged into F.C. Ashdod.

The season took place from the first match on 14 August 1999 to the final match on 27 May 2000. Hapoel Tel Aviv won the title, teams relegated were Hapoel Kfar Saba, Maccabi Herzliya and Hapoel Jerusalem.

== Final table ==
Pos	Team	Pld	W	D	L	GF	GA	GD	Pts	Qualification or relegation
1	Hapoel Tel Aviv (C)	39	26	7	6	76	28	+48	85	Qualification for the Champions League second qualifying round
2	Maccabi Haifa	39	22	10	7	86	35	+51	76	Qualification for the UEFA Cup qualifying round
3	Hapoel Petah Tikva	39	23	5	11	77	52	+25	74	Qualification for the Intertoto Cup first round
4	Maccabi Petah Tikva	39	18	6	15	50	47	+3	60	
5	Beitar Jerusalem	39	15	14	10	61	54	+7	59	Qualification for the UEFA Cup qualifying round
6	Maccabi Tel Aviv (Note: Maccabi Tel Aviv had four points deducted as Kfir Edri tested positive for Ephedrine.)	39	18	8	13	66	42	+24	58	
7	Hapoel Haifa	39	13	18	8	53	36	+17	57	
8	F.C. Ashdod	39	13	13	13	48	49	−1	52	
9	Ironi Rishon LeZion	39	10	13	16	41	65	−24	43	
10	Maccabi Netanya	39	10	11	18	53	71	−18	41	
11	Bnei Yehuda	39	9	13	17	37	64	−27	40	
12	Hapoel Kfar Saba (R)	39	8	14	17	40	56	−16	38	Relegated to Liga Leumit
13	Maccabi Herzliya (R)	39	9	8	22	33	73	−40	35	Relegated to Liga Leumit
14	Hapoel Jerusalem (R)	39	6	6	27	33	82	−49	24	Relegated to Liga Leumit

(C) Champions; (R) Relegated

== Results ==
=== First and second round ===
Home \ Away	BEI	BnY	ASH	HHA	HJE	HKS	HPT	HTA	IRZ	MHA	MHE	MNE	MPT	MTA
Beitar Jerusalem	—	1–1	3–1	3–3	2–0	1–1	1–1	2–0	2–0	1–1	1–1	4–2	3–1	0–1
Bnei Yehuda	2–1	—	1–1	0–2	2–0	1–1	2–4	2–1	1–3	0–2	3–1	1–1	0–2	0–0
F.C. Ashdod	1–1	1–0	—	0–0	3–0	3–2	0–2	1–2	4–2	0–0	0–1	0–2	0–1	1–0
Hapoel Haifa	1–1	1–1	3–0	—	3–2	3–0	2–2	0–0	2–0	0–0	4–0	2–1	1–0	2–4
Hapoel Jerusalem	0–2	0–1	0–1	1–1	—	2–1	0–1	0–1	1–1	1–3	1–4	1–3	0–2	0–1
Hapoel Kfar Saba	1–2	4–1	1–1	0–3	1–0	—	1–3	0–1	2–0	1–1	0–0	0–0	2–2	0–3
Hapoel Petah Tikva	3–0	4–0	4–2	0–2	3–1	2–1	—	0–1	1–0	2–5	1–0	1–0	0–1	2–1
Hapoel Tel Aviv	4–1	1–0	4–2	1–0	3–0	5–1	2–0	—	1–2	0–0	4–0	3–0	2–1	1–1
Ironi Rishon LeZion	1–4	1–0	0–0	0–0	2–2	2–2	1–1	1–3	—	0–7	3–1	1–0	0–1	0–0
Maccabi Haifa	0–2	3–1	0–0	3–2	1–2	1–0	2–0	1–0	4–1	—	3–0	1–1	5–1	1–2
Maccabi Herzliya	1–2	4–0	1–1	0–0	1–2	0–2	1–3	0–5	0–0	2–5	—	1–0	0–4	3–1
Maccabi Netanya	2–3	1–1	0–6	1–2	2–1	4–1	1–2	2–5	2–4	1–3	0–3	—	0–1	3–1
Maccabi Petah Tikva	3–0	1–1	3–1	2–1	0–2	3–2	1–2	1–5	0–0	1–2	1–0	0–0	—	2–1
Maccabi Tel Aviv	1–3	3–1	1–2	0–0	1–1	0–1	0–1	2–0	4–0	0–1	3–0	0–0	1–2	—

Legend: Blue = home team win; Yellow = draw; Red = away team win.

=== Third round ===
Home \ Away	BEI	BnY	ASH	HHA	HJE	HKS	HPT	HTA	IRZ	MHA	MHE	MNE	MPT	MTA
Beitar Jerusalem	—	2–1	1–1	—	1–1	—	—	—	1–4	3–1	—	2–3	1–1	—
Bnei Yehuda	—	—	0–1	—	—	—	2–1	1–1	1–1	—	1–0	—	1–0	—
F.C. Ashdod	—	—	—	—	2–0	1–1	2–2	0–0	—	—	1–0	—	3–2	2–4
Hapoel Haifa	0–0	5–0	0–0	—	3–0	—	—	—	1–1	0–4	—	1–1	—	—
Hapoel Jerusalem	—	2–2	—	—	—	2–1	—	—	3–1	—	1–2	0–4	—	2–4
Hapoel Kfar Saba	1–1	1–1	—	0–0	—	—	—	—	—	1–0	—	1–1	—	2–2
Hapoel Petah Tikva	2–1	—	—	3–1	4–1	0–1	—	0–3	—	—	8–1	—	—	2–2
Hapoel Tel Aviv	2–1	—	—	3–1	3–0	1–0	—	—	—	1–1	2–0	—	—	2–1
Ironi Rishon LeZion	—	—	0–2	—	—	2–1	2–1	1–2	—	—	0–1	—	1–0	—
Maccabi Haifa	—	1–1	2–0	—	6–0	—	4–1	—	0–0	—	—	7–0	1–2	—
Maccabi Herzliya	0–0	—	—	1–1	—	0–2	—	—	—	2–4	—	0–0	—	0–4
Maccabi Netanya	—	4–1	3–1	—	—	—	2–4	1–1	2–2	—	—	—	2–1	—
Maccabi Petah Tikva	—	—	—	0–0	3–1	1–0	2–4	1–0	—	—	0–1	—	—	0–1
Maccabi Tel Aviv	4–1	1–2	—	1–0	—	—	—	—	5–1	3–0	—	2–1	—	—

Legend: Blue = home team win; Yellow = draw; Red = away team win.

== Top scorers ==
Rank	Player	Club	Goals
1	(Israel) Assi Tubi	Maccabi Petah Tikva	27
2	(Moldova) Serghei Cleşcenco	Maccabi Haifa	22
3	(Israel) Yossi Benayoun	Maccabi Haifa	19
4	(Israel) Rafi Cohen	Maccabi Haifa	18
5	(Israel) Ronen Harazi	Hapoel Tel Aviv	17
5	(Israel) Kobi Refua	Bnei Yehuda	17
7	(Israel) Eli Abarbanel	Hapoel Petah Tikva	14
7	(Israel) Amir Turgeman	Hapoel Haifa	14
9	(Israel) Nissan Kapeta	Ironi Rishon LeZion	13
9	(Albania) Viktor Paço	Beitar Jerusalem	13
9	(Israel) Niv Tal	Hapoel Petah Tikva	13

== See also ==
- 1999–2000 Toto Cup Al
