= Janne Hyppönen =

Finnish footballer and manager (born 1970)

Janne Hyppönen (born 14 September 1970 in Vehkalahti) is a top Finnish football manager and former player.

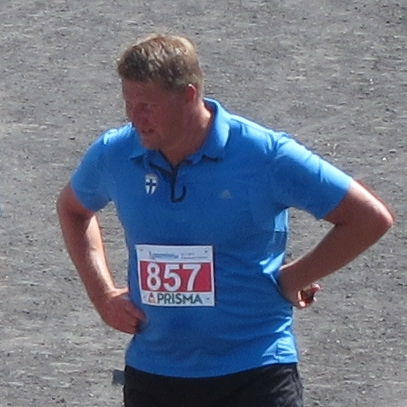
Hyppönen in 2013

He has coached Veikkausliiga clus MYPA and KooTeePee.

Later he has also worked as a coaching director of the youth sector of KTP, having started in November 2019.
