= Jussi-Pekka Rämä =

Finnish footballer (born 1996)

Personal information
- Date of birth: 15 February 1996 (age 30)
- Place of birth: Kouvola, Finland
- Height: 1.84 m (6 ft 0 in)
- Position: Striker

Team information
- Current team: MyPa
- Number: 16

Youth career
- 2012–2015: MYPA

Senior career*
Years	Team	Apps	(Gls)
2013	MYPA	1	(0)
2014	Sudet/2	3	(0)
2014	FC Peltirumpu	5	(5)
2015–2016	Purha	26	(6)
2017–2021	MYPA	111	(63)
2022	MuSa	21	(9)
2023–2025	MyPa	43	(41)
2026	PaPe	10	(20)
2026	→ HaPK (loan)	1	(0)
2026–	MyPa	0	(0)
- * Club domestic league appearances and goals as of 12:41, 19 August 2026 (UTC)

Jussi-Pekka Rämä (born 15 February 1996) is a Finnish professional footballer who plays as a striker for Myllykosken Pallo.

Rämä played youth football with Kouvolan Jalkapallo (KJP) before starting his adult career playing with several clubs in Kouvola. After playing for Purha, he moved to MYPA in 2017. After ending his professional career in 2025, he made sporadic appearances for lower division clubs in south-eastern Finland, before returning to MyPa in 2026. During his stint with the club Rämä has scored 104 goals in 158 matches.

== Youth career ==
Rämä played for KJP youth clubs while also playing some matches for lower league clubs in Kouvola, including Purha, FC Peltirumpu, Sudet and a match in the Finnish League Cup for MYPA.

== Career ==
Rämä started his career with Purha in 2015. He moved to MyPa in 2017 when the club returned to Finnish football after suffering bankruptcy in 2015. Rämä quickly became a crucial part of MYPA's squad, scoring 19 goals in 18 matches in the third division Kolmonen during his first full season with the club.

In 2021, Rämä moved to Musan Salama, playing the 2022 season in the club, before returning to MyPa (Note: MYPA changed the spelling of their name to 'MyPa' in 2022.) for the 2023 season.

In 2025, Rämä ended his professional career. After this, he continued playing for different lower division clubs such as Voikkaan Pallo-Peikot and Haminan Pallo-Kissat.

In August 2026, Rämä returned to MyPa for the remainder of the 2026 season.

== Career statistics ==
=== Club ===
As of match played 21 September 2025

Appearances and goals by club, season and competition
Club	Season	League			National cup (Note: Includes Finnish Cup, Finnish Region's Cup)		League cup (Note: Includes Finnish League Cup)		Other (Note: Includes promotion/relegation playoffs, training matches)		Total	
Club	Season	Division	Apps	Goals	Apps	Goals	Apps	Goals	Apps	Goals	Apps	Goals
MYPA	2013	Veikkausliiga	0	0	0	0	1	0	0	0	1	0
Sudet/2	2014	Nelonen	3	0	0	0	0	0	0	0	3	0
FC Peltirumpu	2014	Kolmonen	5	5	0	0	0	0	0	0	5	5
Purha	2015	Kolmonen	9	2	2	0	0	0	0	0	11	2
Purha	2016	Kolmonen	15	4	0	0	0	0	—		15	4
Purha	Total		24	6	2	0	0	0	0	0	26	6
MYPA	2017	Kolmonen	18	19	4	4	0	0	0	0	22	23
MYPA	2018	Kakkonen	22	23	0	0	0	0	1	0	23	23
MYPA	2019	Ykkönen	25	7	3	0	0	0	0	0	28	7
MYPA	2020	Ykkönen	13	2	5	0	0	0	0	0	18	2
MYPA	2021	Kakkonen	20	8	1	0	0	0	0	0	21	8
MYPA	Total		98	59	13	4	0	0	0	0	111	63
MuSa	2022	Kakkonen	20	9	1	0					21	9
MuSa	Total		20	9	1	0	0	0	0	0	21	9
MyPa	2023	Kolmonen	17	31	3	3			1	0	20	34
MyPa	2024	Kakkonen	8	2	0	0					8	2
MyPa	2025	Kakkonen	14	5	1	0					15	5
	Total		39	38	4	3	0	0	1	0	43	41
PaPe	2026	Vitonen	6	14	3	6	—		—		10	20
HaPK	2026	Kolmonen	1	0	0	0	—		—		1	0
MyPa	2026	Kakkonen	0	0	0	0	—		—		0	0
Career total			193	131	23	13	1	0	2	0	223	144

==== Individual ====
- Kakkonen top goalscorer: 2018
- Kolmonen top goalscorer: 2023
