= Ilkka Mäkelä =

Finnish football manager, former player, and coach

Personal information
- Date of birth: 25 June 1963 (age 63)
- Place of birth: Elimäki, Finland
- Position: Defender

Team information
- Current team: MyPa (Manager)

Senior career*
Years	Team	Apps	(Gls)
–1982	MP	?	(?)
1983	Kuusysi	27	(12)
1984	MP	22	(7)
1985–1989	Haka	98	(13)
1988	Wettingen	?	(?)
1990–1996	MP	159	(7)
1997–1999	RoPS	77	(2)
2000	Lahti	27	(0)
2001–2003	MYPA	7	(0)

International career
	Finland U-21	15	(?)
	Finland	11	(0)

Managerial career
- 2001–2003: MyPa (player-assistant)
- 2004–2007: MyPa
- 2008–2010: Lahti
- 2011–2013: Finland U15
- 2011–2013: Finland U16
- 2011–2013: Finland U17
- 2015–2017: MP
- 2020: MyPa
- 2023–: MP (club president)
- * Club domestic league appearances and goals

Ilkka Mäkelä (born 25 June 1963, in Elimäki) is a Finnish football manager, former player, and current club president of Mikkelin Palloilijat (MP).

== Coaching career ==
He was sacked after the 2010 season as FC Lahti were relegated to Ykkönen. On 20 December 2010 he signed a three-year contract with Finnish FA, taking the Finland's U15, U16 and U17 teams under his management.

On 19 November 2019 MyPa confirmed, that Mäkelä would return as the club's manager for the 2020 season.
