= Antti Ronkainen (footballer) =

Finnish footballer (born 1958)

Personal information
- Date of birth: 7 June 1958 (age 68)
- Place of birth: Mikkeli, Finland
- Position: Midfielder

Senior career*
Years	Team	Apps	(Gls)
1973–1977	MP	52	(4)
1978–1979	Haka	49	(16)
1980–1984	Vasalund IF	98	(18)
1985–1987	MP	41	(4)
1988	JoKu Joutseno	16	(3)
1989–1992	MP	104	(0)
Total		360	(45)

International career
1975	Finland U18		
1978–1981	Finland	12	(0)

Managerial career
- 1993: PU-62
- 2000–2001: MiKi
- 2005–2006: MP
- * Club domestic league appearances and goals

Antti Ronkainen (born 7 June 1958) is a Finnish football manager and former footballer who played as a midfielder.

== Career ==
As a player, Ronkainen was known for his ball control and dangerous spiraling free kicks. He was part of the Finland under-18 national team that finished as runners-up at the 1975 UEFA European Under-18 Championship. Later on, he made 12 appearances for the Finland national team between 1978 and 1981, including four in 1982 FIFA World Cup qualification.

== Managerial career ==
Ronkainen was the manager of PU-62 in 1993, and MiKi between 2000 and 2001. In 2005, he was appointed as the manager of MP, after manager Risto Lähde stepped down before the start of the season. In October 2005, he signed a two-year contract extension at MP, but left the club in 2006.
