= Michael Brundin =

Swedish footballer

Personal information
- Full name: Per Michael Brundin
- Date of birth: 5 October 1965 (age 61)
- Place of birth: Timrå, Sweden
- Height: 1.86 m (6 ft 1 in)
- Position: Centre-back

Senior career*
| Years | Team | Apps | (Gls) |
| 1983–1986 | IFK Sundsvall | 82 | (1) |
| 1987–1994 | GIF Sundsvall | 163 | (4) |
| 1994–1995 | Vitória Setúbal | 23 | (1) |
| 1995–1996 | Campomaiorense | 12 | (0) |
| 1996–2000 | AIK | 113 | (0) |
| 2001 | GIF Sundsvall | 12 | (1) |
| Total | | 405 | (7) |

International career
| 1983–1984 | Sweden U19 | 8 | (0) |
- * Club domestic league appearances and goals

Per Michael Brundin (born 5 October 1965) is a Swedish former professional footballer who played as a centre-back. Between 1994 and 1996, Brundin moved abroad to play in Portugal for Vitória de Setúbal and Campomaiorense.

== Honours ==
GIF Sundsvall

- Swedish Football Division 1 Norra: 1990

AIK

- Allsvenskan: 1998
- Svenska Cupen: 1996–97, 1998–99
