= Michael Gernsøe =

Danish footballer (born 1971)

Personal information
- Date of birth: 22 May 1971 (age 55)
- Place of birth: Copenhagen, Denmark
- Position: Striker

Senior career*
Years	Team	Apps	(Gls)
1994–1996	Fremad Amager		
1996	Cercle Brugge	8	(0)
1997–1998	Hvidovre	2	(0)
1998–2001	Fremad Amager		
2002	HIK		
2002–2008	AB 70		
- * Club domestic league appearances and goals

Michael Gernsøe (born 22 May 1971) is a Danish former professional footballer who played as a striker.

Gernsøe made an impressive breakthrough under head coach Torben Storm as part of the Fremad Amager team in 1995–96. This prompted a move to Belgian club Cercle Brugge in 1996. After eight league appearances, he returned to Denmark to play for Hvidovre IF.

He retired from football in November 2007, after having played several years for lower-tier club AB 70.
