= David Ujmajuridze =

Georgian footballer

Personal information
- Full name: David Ujmajuridze
- Date of birth: 17 January 1970 (age 56)
- Place of birth: Kobuleti, Georgian SSR
- Position: Striker

Youth career
- 1988–1990: Dinamo Batumi

Senior career*
Years	Team	Apps	(Gls)
1990–1997	Dinamo Batumi	143	(56)
1997–1998	Enosis Neon Paralimni	25	(8)
1998–1999	Anagennisi Deryneia	-	(-)
- * Club domestic league appearances and goals

David Ujmajuridze (born 17 January 1970) is a retired Georgian football striker. After becoming top goalscorer of the Erovnuli Liga in 1996–97 he tried his luck in Cyprus.
