= Lennart Bak =

Danish footballer (born 1972)

Personal information
- Date of birth: 13 September 1972 (age 54)
- Place of birth: Frederikshavn
- Position: Midfielder

Senior career*
Years	Team	Apps	(Gls)
1992–1994	Frederikshavn		
1994–1996	AGF		
1997–1998	Foggia		
1998–1999	Salernitana		
1999–2000	AGF		
2001–2002	AaB		
- * Club domestic league appearances and goals

Lennart Bak (born 13 September 1972) is a Danish retired football midfielder.
