= Moshe Sabag =

Israeli footballer

Moshe Sabag משה סבג
Personal information
- Full name: Moshe Sabag
- Date of birth: April 27, 1973 (age 53)
- Place of birth: Klahim, Israel
- Position: Defender

Youth career
- Hapoel Merhavim
- Hapoel Be'er Sheva

Senior career*
Years	Team	Apps	(Gls)
1990–1995	Hapoel Merhavim		
1995–2007	Hapoel Ironi Rishon LeZion	326	(21)
2000	Hapoel Be'er Sheva (loan)		
2001	Hapoel Ashkelon (loan)		
2008	Hapoel Tzafririm Holon	13	(4)
2008–2009	Hapoel Nahlat Yehuda	16	(2)
2009–2010	F.C. Shikun HaMizrah	22	(7)
2010–2012	Maccabi Be'er Ya'akov	57	(28)
- * Club domestic league appearances and goals

Moshe Sabag (Hebrew: משה סבג; born April 27, 1973) is an Israeli football (soccer) player.

== Honours ==
- Israel State Cup:
  - Runner-up (1): 1996
