= Claus Eftevaag =

Norwegian footballer (born 1969)

Personal information
- Full name: Claus Lehland Eftevaag
- Date of birth: 20 December 1969 (age 56)
- Place of birth: Kristiansand, Norway
- Position: Defender

Senior career*
Years	Team	Apps	(Gls)
1986–1995	Start		
1996–1997	Brann	27	(2)
1997–1998	Lierse	21	(2)

International career
1984–1985	Norway U15	11	(2)
1985–1986	Norway U16	12	(2)
1986	Norway U17	2	(0)
1988	Norway U18	2	(0)
1987	Norway U19	6	(4)
1989	Norway U20	4	(0)
1987–1991	Norway U21	19	(6)
1990–1995	Norway	3	(0)
- * Club domestic league appearances and goals

Claus Eftevaag (born 20 December 1969) is a retired Norwegian football defender.

== Honours ==
Lierse SK

- Belgian Super Cup: 1997
