= Ruslan Romanchuk =

Ukrainian footballer

Personal information
- Full name: Ruslan Volodymyrovych Romanchuk
- Date of birth: 12 October 1974 (age 52)
- Place of birth: Odesa, Ukrainian SSR
- Position: Midfielder

Senior career*
Years	Team	Apps	(Gls)
1992–1995	Chornomorets Odesa	60	(4)
1992–1995	→ Chornomorets-2 Odesa	30	(2)
1995	Kremin Kremenchuk	4	(0)
1995–1996	Nyva Vinnytsia	46	(7)
1997	FC Gütersloh	4	(0)
1998–1999	TuS Celle	7	(1)
2000–2002	Chornomorets Odesa	67	(10)
2000–2002	→ Chornomorets-2 Odesa	4	(0)
2003	Zakarpattya Uzhhorod	9	(1)
2003	Ivan Odesa	5	(0)
2004	Taraz	16	(3)
2004	Spartak Sumy	7	(0)
2005	Dnister Ovidiopol	12	(2)
- * Club domestic league appearances and goals

Ruslan Volodymyrovych Romanchuk (born 12 October 1974) is a retired Ukrainian football midfielder.
