= Eugen Voica =

Romanian footballer

Personal information
- Date of birth: 2 December 1969 (age 56)
- Place of birth: Bistrița, Romania
- Position: Midfielder

Senior career*
Years	Team	Apps	(Gls)
1991–1992	Politehnica Timișoara		
1992–1995	Universitatea Cluj	50	(2)
1994	→ Politehnica Timișoara		
1995–1998	Gloria Bistrița		
1998	Universitatea Cluj	5	(0)
1999	Ceahlăul Piatra Neamț		
- * Club domestic league appearances and goals

Eugen Voica (born 2 December 1969) is a retired Romanian football midfielder.

== Activity ==
- FC Politehnica Timișoara (1991-1992)
- FC Universitatea Cluj (1992-1993)
- FC Politehnica Timișoara (1994-1994)
- FC Universitatea Cluj (1994-1995)
- ACF Gloria Bistrița (1995-1998)
- FC Universitatea Cluj (1998-1998)
- CSM Ceahlăul Piatra Neamț (1999-1999)
