= Ruslan Lyubarskyi =

Ukrainian footballer (born 1973)

Personal information
- Date of birth: 29 September 1973 (age 53)
- Place of birth: Bar, Ukrainian SSR, Soviet Union
- Height: 1.80 m (5 ft 11 in)
- Positions: Midfielder; striker

Youth career
- CSKA Kyiv

Senior career*
Years	Team	Apps	(Gls)
1992–1993	CSKA Kyiv	38	(10)
1993–1996	Chemlon Humenné	90	(18)
1996–1997	Sparta Prague	7	(0)
1997–2000	Košice	83	(34)
2000–2004	Maccabi Netanya	144	(31)
2004–2008	Metalurh Zaporizhya	94	(4)
2008–2009	Humenné	26	(5)
2009–2010	Zemplín Michalovce	20	(9)
2010–2015	Futura Humenné	56	(8)
2015–2018	TJ Družstevník Radvaň nad Laborcom		
2018–2019	ŠK Slávia Lackovce		

Managerial career
- 2011–2012: 1. HFC Humenné (player-manager)
- * Club domestic league appearances and goals

Ruslan Lyubarskyi (born 29 September 1973) is a Ukrainian former professional footballer who played as a midfielder. He is mostly known for his time playing in Košice in the Corgoň Liga and Maccabi Netanya in the Israeli Premier League.

== Career ==
Lyubarski was born in Bar, Ukraine. He spent six seasons in Slovakia, where he led 1. FC Košice to two championships. He had a brief spell with Sparta Prague. He also played for Maccabi Netanya in Israel for four seasons, also playing with the club in the Intertoto Cup. Lyubarskyi came to Metalurh in 2004, and debuted in a match against Tavriya Simferopol.

In 2008 he came back to play in Slovakia as he signed for Humenné.

On 17 July 2015, Lyubarski moved to TJ Družstevník Radvaň nad Laborcom, a small amateur club that plays in 4. Liga.

== Honours ==
- Corgoň Liga: 1997, 1998
- Slovak Cup: 1996
- 3. Liga: 2011–12
