= Vitālijs Dolgopolovs =

Latvian footballer

Personal information
- Date of birth: 3 October 1973 (age 53)
- Position: Midfielder

Senior career*
Years	Team	Apps	(Gls)
1990–1992	Olimpia Liepāja		
1993–1995	RAF Jelgava		
1996	Universitāte Rīga		
1997	FK Ventspils		

International career
1996	Latvia	1	(0)
- * Club domestic league appearances and goals

Vitālijs Dolgopolovs (born 3 October 1973) is a retired Latvian football midfielder.
