= Cesar Pachà =

Chilean-Swedish footballer

Personal information
- Full name: Cesar Alex Pachà Romero
- Date of birth: 1 November 1975
- Place of birth: Santiago, Chile
- Height: 1.85 m (6 ft 1 in)
- Position: Forward

Youth career
- 1985–86: O'Higgins
- 1987: Djurgårdens IF
- 1988–1989: IF Brommapojkarna
- 1990: Sundbybergs IK

Senior career*
Years	Team	Apps	(Gls)
1991–1995	Spårvägens GoIF	44	(19)
1996–1997	AIK	34	(6)
1998–2000	Hammarby IF	10	(0)
2001	FC Lahti	9	(2)
2001–2002	Väsby IK	11	(2)
2003	Kuopio PS	16	(1)
2006–2007	Hanvikens SK	–	(–)
Total		124	(30)

International career
	Sweden U21	3	(2)
- * Club domestic league appearances and goals

Cesar Alex Pachà Romero (born 1 November 1975) is a Chilean-Swedish former footballer.

== Personal life ==
His younger brothers, Victor and Eber, were also footballers. They all three coincided in Hanvikens SK.

== Honours ==
AIK

- Svenska Cupen: 1996–97
