= Temur Tugushi =

Georgian footballer (1972–2021)

Temur Tugushi თემურ ტუღუში
Personal information
- Date of birth: 24 February 1972
- Date of death: 18 August 2021 (aged 49)
- Place of death: Tbilisi, Georgia
- Height: 1.70 m (5 ft 7 in)
- Position: Midfielder

Senior career*
Years	Team	Apps	(Gls)
1989	MTsOP Tbilisi	1	(0)
1990–1997	FC Dinamo Batumi	209	(60)
1997–1998	Bnei Yehuda Tel Aviv F.C.	12	(1)
1998	FC Dinamo Batumi	11	(6)
1999	FC Dinamo Tbilisi	9	(3)
1999–2002	FC Dinamo Batumi	84	(5)
2002–2004	FC Kolkheti-1913 Poti	21	(0)

International career
1994	Georgia	3	(0)
- * Club domestic league appearances and goals

Temur Tugushi (Georgian: თემურ ტუღუში; 24 February 1972 – 18 August 2021) was a Georgian professional football player and manager.

== Honours ==
Dinamo Batumi

- Georgian Cup: 1998

Dinamo Tbilisi

- Georgian League: 1998–99
