= Mikkelin Palloilijat =

Finnish football club

- Full name: Mikkelin Palloilijat
- Nickname: Siniset (The Blues)
- Founded: 1929; 97 years ago
- Ground: Mikkelin Urheilupuisto, Mikkeli, Finland
- Capacity: 7,000
- Chairman: Keijo Pylkkänen
- Manager: Ozeias Graciano
- League: Ykkösliiga
- 2026: Ykkösliiga, 7th of 10
- Website: https://mikkelinpalloilijat.fi/
Home colours	Away colours

Mikkelin Palloilijat (or MP) is a Finnish professional football club, based in Mikkeli, that competes in the Ykkösliiga, the second tier in the Finnish football league system. The club was founded in 1929 and also included volleyball, bandy and ice hockey divisions.

== History ==
In 1998, MP merged with Mikkelin Kissat to form FC Mikkeli. Due to financial difficulties, this union was dissolved in 2001 and the two clubs returned to manage individually. It played in the Finnish First Division (Ykkönen) from 2004 to 2006 but was relegated to Kakkonen at the end of the season. The club gained promotion to Ykkönen by winning the Group A of Kakkonen 2009 but was immediately relegated back to Kakkonen in 2010. The club's manager is Juha Pasoja, and it plays its home matches at Mikkelin Urheilupuisto. In 2015, they got promoted to the Ykkönen again.

Ice hockey departments of MP and local rivals MiPK merged in 1970, creating new club Jukurit. Jukurit has since then been quite successful in Finnish amateur levels of ice hockey. However, the only medal in the Finnish championship is still won by MP, a bronze in A-juniors in the year 1961.

Bandy department of MP was disbanded in 1977. After that the colours of Mikkeli on bandy fields have been represented by Mikkelin Kampparit. Kampparit was formed in 1972.

MP was a pioneer of women's football in Finland, forming one of the first ladies team. The spot in Kansallinen Liiga was moved from MP to Porrassalmen Urheilijat-62 in 1992.

== Season to season ==
Season to season of MP

Season	Level	Division	Section	Administration	Position	Movements
1930	Tier 3	Piirisarja (Second Division)		Savo (SPL Savo)	?	
1931	Tier 3	Piirisarja (Second Division)		Savo (SPL Savo)	2nd	
1932	Tier 3	Piirisarja (Second Division)		Savo (SPL Savo)	4th	
1933	Tier 3	Piirisarja (Second Division)		Savo (SPL Savo)	2nd	
1934	Tier 3	Piirisarja (Second Division)		Savo (SPL Savo)	3rd	
1935	Tier 3	Piirisarja (Second Division)		Savo (SPL Savo)	5th	
1936	Tier 4	Piirisarja (Third Division)	?	Savo (SPL Savo)	?	
1937	Tier 4	Piirisarja (Third Division)	?	Savo (SPL Savo)	?	
1938	Tier 4	Piirisarja (Third Division)	?	Savo (SPL Savo)	?	Play-offs
1939	Tier 2	Itä-Länsi Sarja (First Division)	East series north group	Finnish FA (Suomen Pallolitto)	6th	
1940–41						Did not participate
1943–44						Did not participate
1945–46	Tier 3	Maakuntasarja (Second Division)	Kymenlaakso North	Finnish FA (Suomen Pallolitto)	3rd	
1946–47	Tier 3	Maakuntasarja (Second Division)	Kymenlaakso North	Finnish FA (Suomen Pallolitto)	2nd	
1947–48	Tier 3	Maakuntasarja (Second Division)	Kymenlaakso North	Finnish FA (Suomen Pallolitto)	1st	Play-offs
1948	Tier 3	Maakuntasarja (Second Division)	East group A	Finnish FA (Suomen Pallolitto)	5th	
1949	Tier 3	Maakuntasarja (Second Division)	East group A	Finnish FA (Suomen Pallolitto)	6th	Relegated
1950	Tier 4	Piirisarja (Third Division)	?	Savo (SPL Savo)	?	Play-offs, promoted
1951	Tier 3	Maakuntasarja (Second Division)	East group B	Finnish FA (Suomen Pallolitto)	3rd	
1952	Tier 3	Maakuntasarja (Second Division)	East group A	Finnish FA (Suomen Pallolitto)	5th	
1953	Tier 3	Maakuntasarja (Second Division)	East group B	Finnish FA (Suomen Pallolitto)	6th	Relegated
1954	Tier 4	Piirisarja (Third Division)	?	Saimaa (SPL Saimaa)	?	
1955	Tier 4	Piirisarja (Third Division)	?	Saimaa (SPL Saimaa)	?	Play-offs, promoted
1956	Tier 3	Maakuntasarja (Second Division)	East group II	Finnish FA (Suomen Pallolitto)	6th	
1957	Tier 3	Maakuntasarja (Second Division)	East group I	Finnish FA (Suomen Pallolitto)	6th	
1958	Tier 3	Maakuntasarja (Second Division)	Group 6	Finnish FA (Suomen Pallolitto)	2nd	
1959	Tier 3	Maakuntasarja (Second Division)	Group 4	Finnish FA (Suomen Pallolitto)	1st	Promoted
1960	Tier 2	Suomensarja (First Division)	East Group	Finnish FA (Suomen Pallolitto)	6th	
1961	Tier 2	Suomensarja (First Division)	East Group	Finnish FA (Suomen Pallolitto)	5th	
1962	Tier 2	Suomensarja (First Division)	East Group	Finnish FA (Suomen Pallolitto)	3rd	
1963	Tier 2	Suomensarja (First Division)	East Group	Finnish FA (Suomen Pallolitto)	4th	
1964	Tier 2	Suomensarja (First Division)	East Group	Finnish FA (Suomen Pallolitto)	3rd	
1965	Tier 2	Suomensarja (First Division)	East Group	Finnish FA (Suomen Pallolitto)	1st	Promoted
1966	Tier 1	Mestaruussarja		Finnish FA (Suomen Palloliitto	4th	
1967	Tier 1	Mestaruussarja		Finnish FA (Suomen Palloliitto	10th	
1968	Tier 1	Mestaruussarja		Finnish FA (Suomen Palloliitto	8th	
1969	Tier 1	Mestaruussarja		Finnish FA (Suomen Palloliitto	5th	
1970	Tier 1	Mestaruussarja		Finnish FA (Suomen Palloliitto	2nd	
1971	Tier 1	Mestaruussarja		Finnish FA (Suomen Palloliitto	5th	
1972	Tier 1	Mestaruussarja		Finnish FA (Suomen Palloliitto	2nd	
1973	Tier 1	Mestaruussarja		Finnish FA (Suomen Palloliitto	7th	
1974	Tier 1	Mestaruussarja		Finnish FA (Suomen Palloliitto	10th	
1975	Tier 1	Mestaruussarja		Finnish FA (Suomen Palloliitto	9th	
1976	Tier 1	Mestaruussarja		Finnish FA (Suomen Palloliitto	6th	
1977	Tier 1	Mestaruussarja		Finnish FA (Suomen Palloliitto	11th	Relegated
1978	Tier 2	I divisioona (First Division)		Finnish FA (Suomen Pallolitto)	4th	
1979	Tier 2	I divisioona (First Division)		Finnish FA (Suomen Pallolitto)	1st	Promotion Group 6th
1980	Tier 2	I divisioona (First Division)		Finnish FA (Suomen Pallolitto)	1st	Promotion Group 3rd, promoted
1981	Tier 1	Mestaruussarja		Finnish FA (Suomen Palloliitto	11th	Relegation Group 6th, relegated
1982	Tier 2	I divisioona (First Division)		Finnish FA (Suomen Pallolitto)	3rd	Promotion Group 5th
1983	Tier 2	I divisioona (First Division)		Finnish FA (Suomen Pallolitto)	1st	Promotion Group 2nd, promoted
1984	Tier 1	Mestaruussarja		Finnish FA (Suomen Palloliitto	12th	Relegated
1985	Tier 2	I divisioona (First Division)		Finnish FA (Suomen Pallolitto)	1st	Promoted
1986	Tier 1	Mestaruussarja		Finnish FA (Suomen Palloliitto	7th	
1987	Tier 1	Mestaruussarja		Finnish FA (Suomen Palloliitto	7th	
1988	Tier 1	Mestaruussarja		Finnish FA (Suomen Palloliitto	9th	Relegation Group 3rd
1989	Tier 1	Mestaruussarja		Finnish FA (Suomen Palloliitto	9th	Relegation Group 4th
1990	Tier 1	Futisliiga		Finnish FA (Suomen Palloliitto	3rd	Play-offs
1991	Tier 1	Futisliiga		Finnish FA (Suomen Palloliitto	2nd	
1992	Tier 1	Veikkausliiga		Finnish FA (Suomen Palloliitto	10th	
1993	Tier 1	Veikkausliiga		Finnish FA (Suomen Palloliitto	9th	Relegation Group 1st
1994	Tier 1	Veikkausliiga		Finnish FA (Suomen Palloliitto	11th	
1995	Tier 1	Veikkausliiga		Finnish FA (Suomen Palloliitto	11th	Relegation play-off
1996	Tier 1	Veikkausliiga		Finnish FA (Suomen Palloliitto	12th	Relegated
1997	Tier 2	Ykkönen (First Division)	South Group	Finnish FA (Suomen Pallolitto)	4th	Promotion Group 7th
1998	Tier 2	Ykkönen (First Division)	North Group	Finnish FA (Suomen Pallolitto)	6th	Relegation Group 1st
1999						did not participate
2000						did not participate
2001						did not participate
2002	Tier 3	Kakkonen (Second Division)	East Group	Finnish FA (Suomen Pallolitto)	2nd	
2003	Tier 3	Kakkonen (Second Division)	East Group	Finnish FA (Suomen Pallolitto)	2nd	Play-offs, promoted
2004	Tier 2	Ykkönen (First Division)		Finnish FA (Suomen Pallolitto)	7th	
2005	Tier 2	Ykkönen (First Division)		Finnish FA (Suomen Pallolitto)	9th	
2006	Tier 2	Ykkönen (First Division)		Finnish FA (Suomen Pallolitto)	13th	Relegated
2007	Tier 3	Kakkonen (Second Division)	Group A	Finnish FA (Suomen Pallolitto)	3rd	
2008	Tier 3	Kakkonen (Second Division)	Group A	Finnish FA (Suomen Pallolitto)	6th	
2009	Tier 3	Kakkonen (Second Division)	Group A	Finnish FA (Suomen Pallolitto)	1st	Promoted
2010	Tier 2	Ykkönen (First Division)		Finnish FA (Suomen Pallolitto)	14th	Relegated
2011	Tier 3	Kakkonen (Second Division)	Group A	Finnish FA (Suomen Pallolitto)	3rd	
2012	Tier 3	Kakkonen (Second Division)	East Group	Finnish FA (Suomen Pallolitto)	3rd	
2013	Tier 3	Kakkonen (Second Division)	East Group	Finnish FA (Suomen Pallolitto)	2nd	
2014	Tier 3	Kakkonen (Second Division)	East Group	Finnish FA (Suomen Pallolitto)	2nd	Promoted
2015	Tier 2	Ykkönen (First Division)		Finnish FA (Suomen Pallolitto)	9th	Relegated
2016	Tier 3	Kakkonen (Second Division)	Group A	Finnish FA (Suomen Pallolitto)	3rd	
2017	Tier 3	Kakkonen (Second Division)	Group A	Finnish FA (Suomen Pallolitto)	9th	
2018	Tier 3	Kakkonen (Second Division)	Group A	Finnish FA (Suomen Pallolitto)	7th	
2019	Tier 3	Kakkonen (Second Division)	Group A	Finnish FA (Suomen Pallolitto)	1st	Promoted
2020	Tier 2	Ykkönen (First Division)		Finnish FA (Suomen Pallolitto)	7th	
2021	Tier 2	Ykkönen (First Division)		Finnish FA (Suomen Pallolitto)	9th	
2022	Tier 2	Ykkönen (First Division)		Finnish FA (Suomen Pallolitto)	8th	
2023	Tier 2	Ykkönen (First Division)		Finnish FA (Suomen Pallolitto)	3rd	Promotion Playoff
2024	Tier 2	Ykkösliiga (League One)		Finnish FA (Suomen Pallolitto)	10th	Relegated
2025	Tier 3	Ykkönen (First Division)		Finnish FA (Suomen Pallolitto)	1st	Promoted
2026	Tier 2	Ykkösliiga (League One)		Finnish FA (Suomen Pallolitto)		

- 25 seasons in Veikkausliiga
- 26 seasons in Second Tier
- 32 seasons in Third Tier
- 6 seasons in Fourth Tier

== Current squad ==
As of 3 September 2026

Note: Flags indicate national team as defined under FIFA eligibility rules; some limited exceptions apply. Players may hold more than one non-FIFA nationality.

No.	Pos.	Nation	Player
1	GK	CAN	Shafique Wilson
2	DF	FIN	Salomon Särkkä
4	DF	FIN	Ville Laiho
5	FW	FIN	Aapo Karttunen
6	DF	FIN	Tyson Afshari
7	DF	JPN	Aoi Chishima
8	MF	FIN	Miko Koivuniemi (on loan from Ilves)
9	FW	SYR	Mohamad Ahmad Al-Sheikh
10	FW	FIN	Eero Ylönen
11	MF	FIN	Oliver Häyhänen
12	FW	FIN	Onni Kimari
13	FW	FIN	Veikko Karttunen
14	MF	FIN	Mico Snellman
15	FW	FIN	Santeri Stenius
16	FW	NGR	Samson Obioha

No.	Pos.	Nation	Player
17	DF	FIN	Santu Seppänen
18	DF	FIN	Nuutti Krivetz
19	MF	FIN	Veikko Janhunen
21	MF	FIN	Kasper Sundberg
22	GK	FIN	Jonne Uronen
24	MF	CAN	Rohun Kawale
26	MF	FIN	Akoon Kuek
28	FW	FIN	Akseli Tervaniemi
31	FW	FIN	Paavo Haapalainen
33	GK	FIN	Timi Heikkinen
42	DF	FIN	Arop Ring
44	MF	FIN	Niila Forsell
87	MF	FIN	Milot Kastrati
97	DF	FIN	Aaron Traore
99	FW	FIN	Peetu Kerminen

== Management and boardroom ==
=== Management ===
As of 21 February 2020

Name	Role
(Senegal) Issa Thiaw	Head coach
(Finland) Jorma Naakka	Coach
(Brazil) Ozeias Graciano	Coach
(Finland) Janne Loukiainen	Coach
(Finland) Mika Korpela	Team manager
(Finland) Aki Lampinen	Kit manager
(Finland) Hannu Paajanen	Doctor
(Finland) Ilari Kuitunen	Doctor
(Finland) Timo Kyttä	Physiotherapist
(Finland) Janne Lindberg	Coaching coordinator
(Finland) Ilkka Mäkelä	Club president

== Notable former players ==
- (Finland) Jussi Jääskeläinen
- (Finland) Topi Keskinen
- (Finland) Shefki Kuqi
- (Finland) Eetu Muinonen
- (Finland) Antti Kuismala
- (Finland) Antti Ronkainen
- (Finland) Olli Rehn
- (Finland) Ilkka Mäkelä
