= Myllykosken Pallo −47 =

Finnish association football club

MyPa
- Full name: Myllykosken Pallo -47
- Short name: MyPa
- Founded: 1947; 79 years ago
- Ground: Saviniemen Jalkapallostadion; Kouvola
- Capacity: 4,167
- Chairman: Inka Häkkinen
- Manager: Miika Kuntonen
- League: Kolmonen
- 2026: Kakkonen Group A, 10th of 10 (relegated)
- Website: http://mypa.fi/
Home colours	Away colours

Myllykosken Pallo -47, commonly referred to as MyPa, is a Finnish football club based in Myllykoski, a neighbourhood in Kouvola. The club currently competes in Kakkonen, the fourth tier of Finnish football league system. Founded in 1947, the club spent most of the 1990s and 2000s in the top tier of Finnish football, Veikkausliiga. The club temporarily shut down after having ceased operations in 2015 due to financial difficulties, but returned in 2017 to the third division Kolmonen. The club's home ground is Saviniemen Jalkapallostadion.

== History ==
MyPa was founded in December 1947 in the village of Myllykoski in the then municipality of Sippola, which in 1975 became part of the town of Anjalankoski and since 2009 is part of Kouvola. Before that there had been some small-scale football culture in Myllykoski, so forming a football club was a natural step. The final move came from the local paper industry, which built a football pitch with spectator stands. MyPa was promoted to the highest tier in 1975, but the season ended in relegation.

=== Veikkausliiga ===
MyPa played continuously in the Veikkausliiga from 1992 to 2014. From 1993 to 1996 they were runners up four consecutive times under the control of Harri Kampman. They won a first Finnish Cup in 1992, and a second in 1995. In 1997 Timo Liekoski was named as the manager of the club, but his employment lasted only one season. He was replaced by Juha Malinen. From 1999 to 2001, under the control of Malinen, MyPa finished third three times in a row, and finished second in 2002. After the 2003 season Malinen was replaced by Ilkka Mäkelä. Though dropping to 8th in the league, in 2004 MyPa won a third Finnish Cup, and the following season won their first league championship. The seasons following the championship were marked by mixed success. Mäkelä resigned during the 2007 season after a series of losses, and the former assistant coach Janne Hyppönen became the new manager. Hyppönen was sacked in September 2008 and assistant Janne Lindberg took over in a caretaker capacity for the rest of the season. In the 2009 season the club changed their spelling from 'MyPa' to 'MYPA'. In the same season under Lindberg MYPA finished ninth, which was their worst placement in Veikkausliiga. MYPA was denied league licence for the 2015 season due to financial troubles, and after at first having accepted a place in the second tier Ykkönen, finally withdrew from all professional football on February 13th 2015.

=== Return ===
MYPA made a return in the 2017 season earning a place from Purha in the Finnish third division Kolmonen due to Purha having difficulties gathering a team for the upcoming season.

In the 2017 Kolmonen season MYPA didn't lose a single match and was promoted to the second division Kakkonen. Playing in Group A of the second division, MYPA continued their positive endeavors by winning their group, which granted them a place in the promotion playoffs to Ykkönen. They lost the following playoffs to Tampereen Pallo-Veikot.

Due to PS Kemi relinquishing their place in Ykkönen after getting relegated from Veikkausliiga, MYPA received an invitation to join Ykkönen on their place as first in line for the 2019 season. MYPA accepted the offer and played in Ykkönen for the next two seasons. After struggling on a higher level, MYPA was relegated in the 2020 Ykkönen back to Kakkonen. Losing many key players after getting relegated, MYPA's struggles continued and was relegated back into Kolmonen. After the 2021 season MYPA changed their club name's spelling back into 'MyPa'.

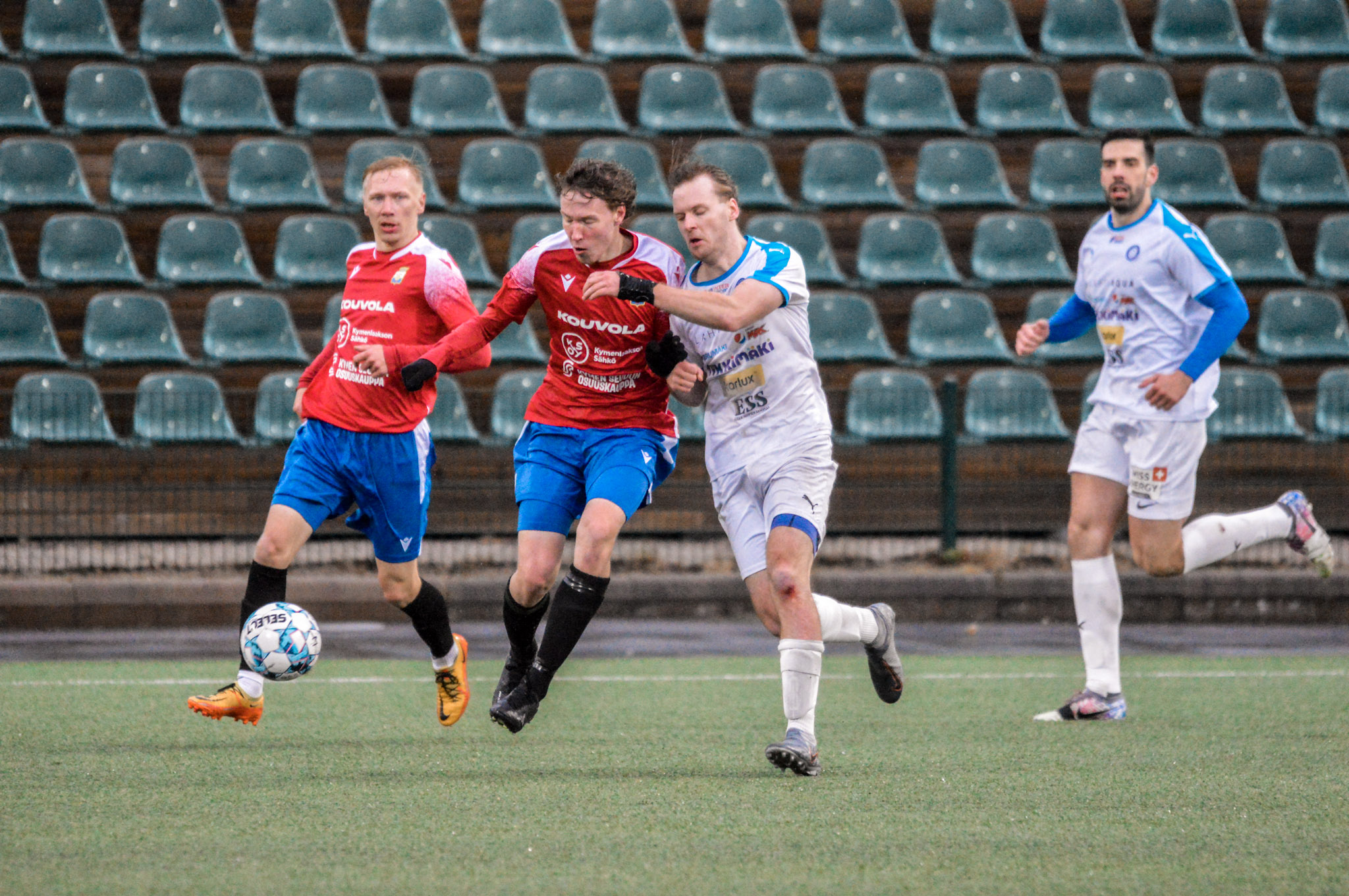
MyPa against FC Kuusysi in 2023 Finnish Cup

In 2022 on their first season back in Kolmonen, MyPa was able to stabilize their results and started winning matches more frequently. However, due to losing points in key matches through the season, MyPa narrowly missed the promotion playoffs and came second behind Haminan Pallo-Kissat. In 2023 after bringing back many key players from the earlier seasons such as Jari Hassel and Jussi-Pekka Rämä, results improved and they won the league by a large margin. The championship granted them a direct promotion to Kakkonen for the 2024 season with Rämä being the top goalscorer of the league with 31 goals in 17 matches.

=== International achievements ===
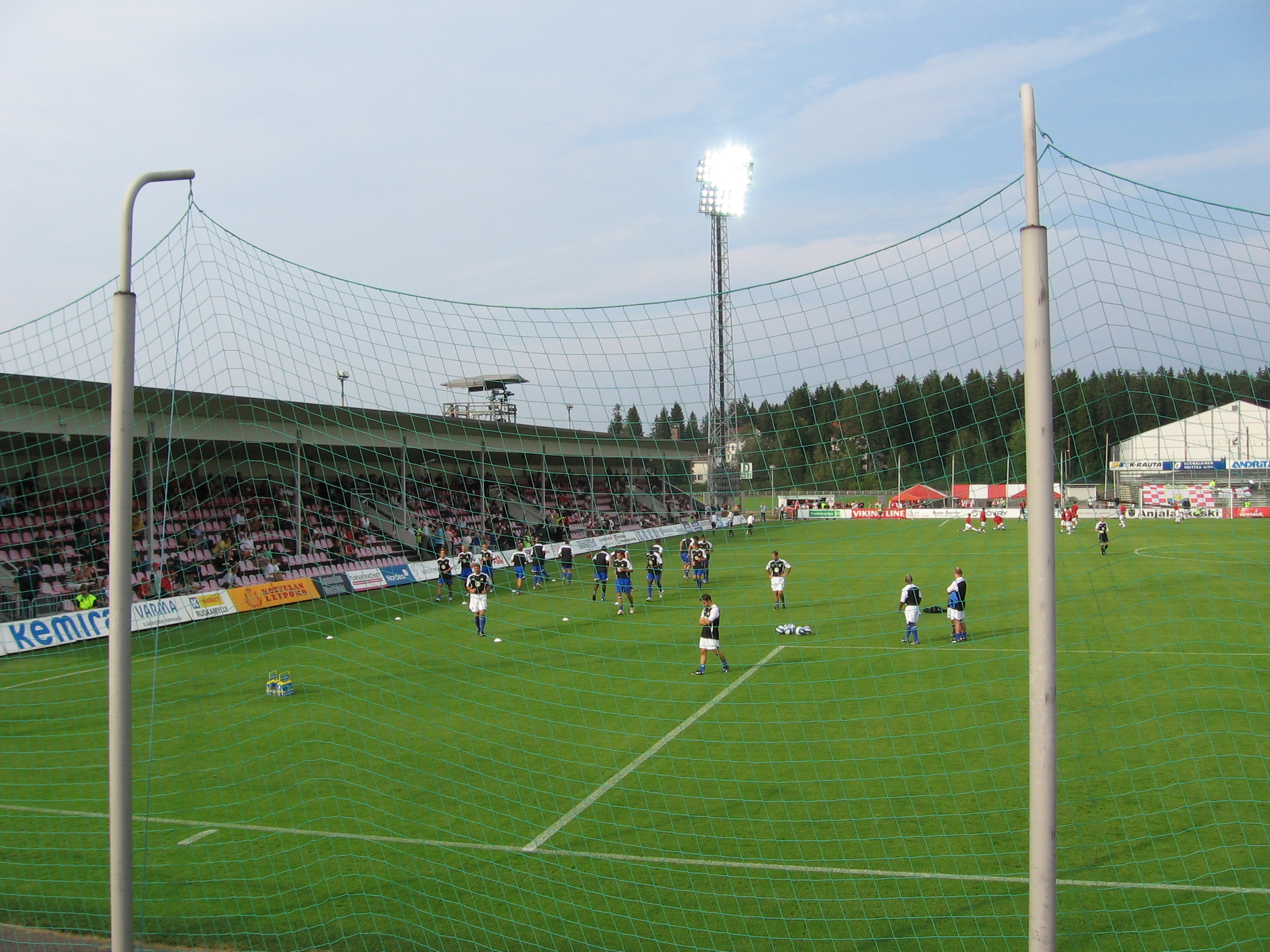
Blackburn Rovers players warming up before a match against MyPa in the 2007–08 UEFA Cup.

MyPa has participated in the UEFA Cup Winners' Cup, UEFA Cup and Intertoto Cup. It has faced many clubs like Boavista, PSV Eindhoven, Rapid București, Liverpool, Blackburn Rovers and Dundee United. In 2005 they reached the first round of UEFA Cup but lost the decisive match against Swiss side Grasshoppers 1–4 on aggregate.

Season	Competition	Round	Country	Club	Score	Agg.
1993–94	UEFA Cup Winners' Cup	Qualifying round	(Iceland)	Valur	1–3, 0–1	1–4
1994–95	UEFA Cup	Qualifying round	(Slovakia)	Inter Bratislava	3–0, 0–1	3–1
1994–95	UEFA Cup	First round	(Portugal)	Boavista	1–2, 1–1	2–3
1995–96	UEFA Cup	Qualifying round	(Scotland)	Motherwell	3–1, 0–2	3–3
1995–96	UEFA Cup	First round	(Netherlands)	PSV Eindhoven	1–1, 1–7	2–8
1996–97	UEFA Cup Winners' Cup	Qualifying round	(Azerbaijan)	Qarabağ	1–0, 1–1	2–1
1996–97	UEFA Cup Winners' Cup	First round	(England)	Liverpool	0–1, 1–3	1–4
1997–98	UEFA Cup	Prel. round	(Cyprus)	Apollon Limassol	1–1, 0–3	1–4
2000	UEFA Intertoto Cup	First round	(Switzerland)	Neuchâtel Xamax	1–2, 3–3	4–5
2001–02	UEFA Cup	Qualifying round	(Sweden)	Helsingborgs IF	1–3, 1–2	2–5
2002–03	UEFA Cup	First qualifying round	(Denmark)	OB Odense	1–0, 0–2	1–2
2003–04	UEFA Cup	Qualifying round	(Switzerland)	Young Boys	3–2, 2–2	5–4
2003–04	UEFA Cup	First round	(France)	Sochaux	0–1, 0–2	0–3
2004	UEFA Intertoto Cup	First round	(Czech Republic)	Tescoma Zlín	1–1, 2–3	3–4
2005–06	UEFA Cup	First qualifying round	(Estonia)	FC TVMK	1–1, 1–0	2–1
2005–06	UEFA Cup	Second qualifying round	(Scotland)	Dundee United	0–0, 2–2	2–2
2005–06	UEFA Cup	First round	(Switzerland)	Grasshopper	1–1, 0–3	1–4
2006–07	UEFA Champions League	First qualifying round	(Wales)	The New Saints	1–0, 1–0	2–0
2006–07	UEFA Champions League	Second qualifying round	(Denmark)	Copenhagen	2–2, 0–2	2–4
2007–08	UEFA Cup	First qualifying round	(Faroe Islands)	EB/Streymur	1–0, 1–1	2–1
2007–08	UEFA Cup	Second qualifying round	(England)	Blackburn Rovers	0–1, 0–2	0–3
2010–11	UEFA Europa League	First qualifying round	(Estonia)	Narva Trans	2–0, 5–0	7–0
2010–11	UEFA Europa League	Second qualifying round	(Andorra)	UE Sant Julià	3–0, 5–0	8–0
2010–11	UEFA Europa League	Third qualifying round	(Romania)	Politehnica Timișoara	1–2, 3–3	4–5
2012–13	UEFA Europa League	First qualifying round	(Wales)	Cefn Druids	0–0, 5–0	5–0
2012–13	UEFA Europa League	Second qualifying round	(Romania)	Rapid București	1–3, 0–2	1–5
2014–15	UEFA Europa League	First qualifying round	(Faroe Islands)	ÍF Fuglafjørður	1–0, 0–0	1–0
2014–15	UEFA Europa League	Second qualifying round	(Belarus)	Dinamo Minsk	0–3, 0–0	0–3

=== UEFA club competition record ===
Updated 14 February 2015.

Competition	Pld	W	D	L	GF	GA
UEFA Champions League	4	2	1	1	4	4
UEFA Cup Winners' Cup	6	1	1	4	4	9
UEFA Cup / UEFA Europa League	42	12	13	17	52	57
UEFA Intertoto Cup	4	0	2	2	7	9
Total	56	15	17	24	67	79

== Honours ==
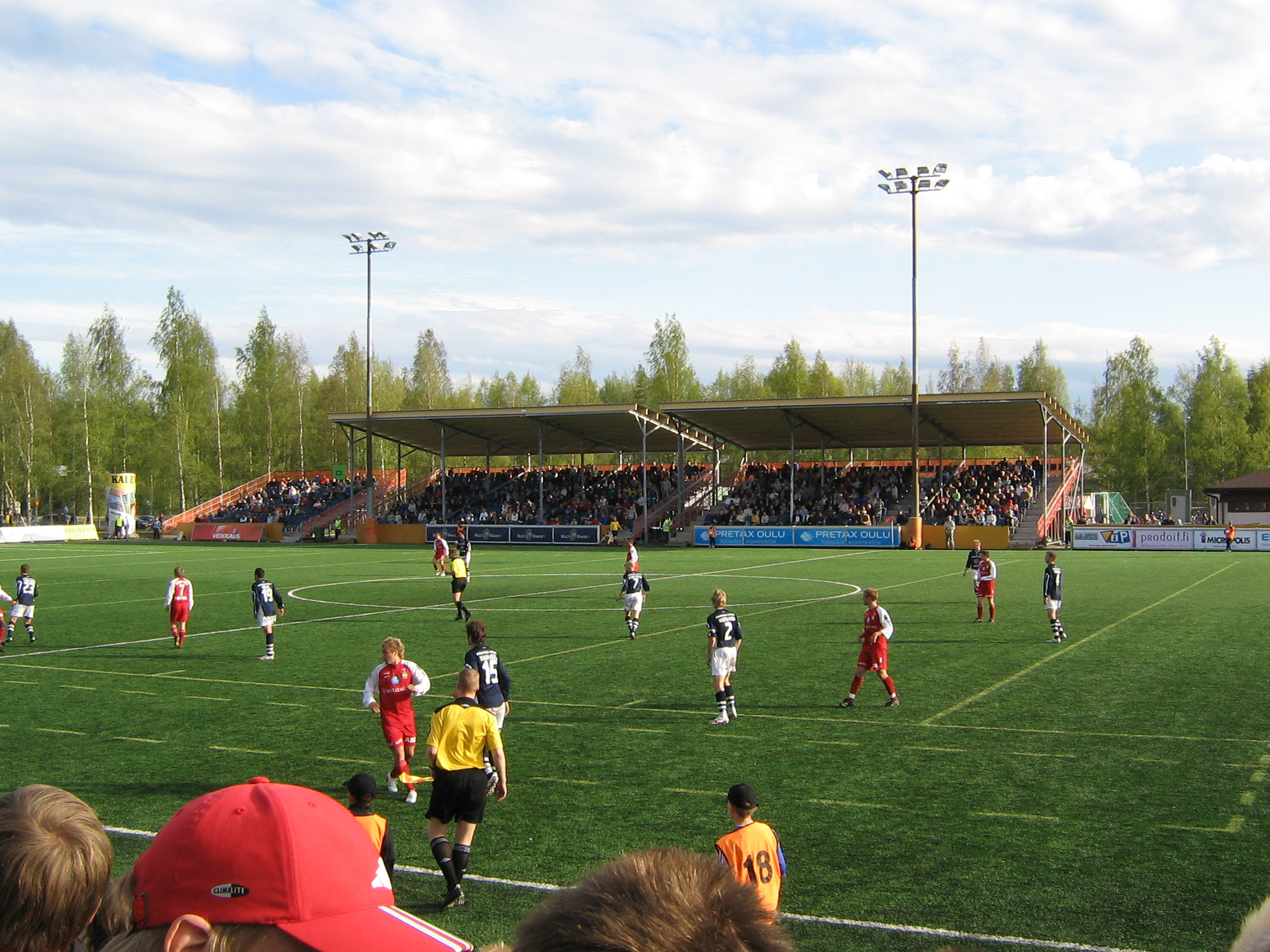
Veikkausliiga match against AC Oulu in May 2007

- Veikkausliiga
  - Winners (1): 2005
  - Runners-up (5): 1993, 1994, 1995, 1996, 2002
  - Third place (3): 1999, 2000, 2001
- Ykkönen, I divisioona
  - Winners (2): 1974, 1991
- Kakkonen
  - A-Group, Winners (1): 2018
- Kolmonen
  - South-Eastern Group, Winners (2): 2017, 2023
- Finnish Cup
  - Winners (3): 1992, 1995, 2004

== Season to season ==
Season to Season of MyPa

Season	Level	Division	Section	Administration	Position	Movements
1929-1947	Myllykosken Kilpa-Veikot (MyKV)					
1947	Tier 3	Maakuntasarja (Second Division)	Häme-East Group	Finnish FA (Suomen Pallolitto)	2nd	
1948	Tier 3	Maakuntasarja (Second Division)	East Group B	Finnish FA (Suomen Pallolitto)	2nd	
1949	Tier 3	Maakuntasarja (Second Division)	East Group B	Finnish FA (Suomen Pallolitto)	2nd	
1950	Tier 3	Maakuntasarja (Second Division)	East Group B	Finnish FA (Suomen Pallolitto)	2nd	
1951	Tier 3	Maakuntasarja (Second Division)	East Group B	Finnish FA (Suomen Pallolitto)	2nd	
1952	Tier 3	Maakuntasarja (Second Division)	East Group B	Finnish FA (Suomen Pallolitto)	3rd	
1953	Tier 3	Maakuntasarja (Second Division)	East Group B	Finnish FA (Suomen Pallolitto)	5th	
1954	Tier 3	Maakuntasarja (Second Division)	East Group IV	Finnish FA (Suomen Pallolitto)	6th	Relegated
1955	Tier 4	Piirinsarja (District League)		Kotka (SPL Kymenlaakso)		
1956	Tier 4	Aluesarja (Fourth Division)	Group 16	Kotka (SPL Kymenlaakso)	2nd	
1957	Tier 4	Aluesarja (Fourth Division)	Group 10 Kymenlaakso & Lahti	Kotka (SPL Kymenlaakso)	1st	Promoted
1958	Tier 3	Maakuntasarja (Third Division)	Group 2 South-East	Finnish FA (Suomen Pallolitto)	7th	Relegated
1959	Tier 4	Aluesarja (Fourth Division)	Group 10 Kymenlaakso	Kotka (SPL Kymenlaakso)	2nd	
1960	Tier 4	Aluesarja (Fourth Division)	Group 10	Kotka (SPL Kymenlaakso)	1st	Promoted
1961	Tier 3	Maakuntasarja (Third Division)	Group 4 South-East	Finnish FA (Suomen Pallolitto)	3rd	
1962	Tier 3	Maakuntasarja (Third Division)	Group 4 South-East	Finnish FA (Suomen Pallolitto)	2nd	
1963	Tier 3	Maakuntasarja (Third Division)	Group 5 South-East	Finnish FA (Suomen Pallolitto)	4th	
1964	Tier 3	Maakuntasarja (Third Division)	Group 5	Finnish FA (Suomen Pallolitto)	4th	
1965	Tier 3	Maakuntasarja (Third Division)	Group 5 South-East	Finnish FA (Suomen Pallolitto)	3rd	
1966	Tier 3	Maakuntasarja (Third Division)	Group 6	Finnish FA (Suomen Pallolitto)	3rd	
1967	Tier 3	Maakuntasarja (Third Division)	Group 6	Finnish FA (Suomen Pallolitto)	2nd	
1968	Tier 3	Maakuntasarja (Third Division)	Group 5	Finnish FA (Suomen Pallolitto)	5th	
1969	Tier 3	Maakuntasarja (Third Division)	Group 5	Finnish FA (Suomen Pallolitto)	1st	Promoted
1970	Tier 2	II divisioona (First Division)	East Group	Finnish FA (Suomen Pallolitto)	8th	
1971	Tier 2	II divisioona (First Division)	East Group	Finnish FA (Suomen Pallolitto)	3rd	
1972	Tier 2	II divisioona (First Division)	East Group	Finnish FA (Suomen Pallolitto)	3rd	moved to new First Division
1973	Tier 2	I divisioona (First Division)		Finnish FA (Suomen Pallolitto)	7th	
1974	Tier 2	I divisioona (First Division)		Finnish FA (Suomen Pallolitto)	1st	Promoted
1975	Tier 1	Mestaruussarja (Premier League)		Finnish FA (Suomen Palloliitto)	12th	Relegated
1976	Tier 2	I divisioona (First Division)		Finnish FA (Suomen Pallolitto)	7th	
1977	Tier 2	I divisioona (First Division)		Finnish FA (Suomen Pallolitto)	9th	
1978	Tier 2	I divisioona (First Division)		Finnish FA (Suomen Pallolitto)	7th	
1979	Tier 2	I divisioona (First Division)		Finnish FA (Suomen Pallolitto)	7th	
1980	Tier 2	I divisioona (First Division)		Finnish FA (Suomen Pallolitto)	6th	
1981	Tier 2	I divisioona (First Division)		Finnish FA (Suomen Pallolitto)	7th	Relegated
1982	Tier 3	II divisioona (Second Division)	South Group	Finnish FA (Suomen Pallolitto)		
1983	Tier 3	II divisioona (Second Division)	South Group	Finnish FA (Suomen Pallolitto)		
1984	Tier 3	II divisioona (Second Division)	South Group	Finnish FA (Suomen Pallolitto)		Promoted
1985	Tier 2	I divisioona (First Division)		Finnish FA (Suomen Pallolitto)	5th	
1986	Tier 2	I divisioona (First Division)		Finnish FA (Suomen Pallolitto)	9th	
1987	Tier 2	I divisioona (First Division)		Finnish FA (Suomen Pallolitto)	6th	
1988	Tier 2	I divisioona (First Division)		Finnish FA (Suomen Pallolitto)	2nd	Promotion play-offs
1989	Tier 2	I divisioona (First Division)		Finnish FA (Suomen Pallolitto)	5th	
1990	Tier 2	I divisioona (First Division)		Finnish FA (Suomen Pallolitto)	5th	
1991	Tier 2	I divisioona (First Division)		Finnish FA (Suomen Pallolitto)	1st	Promoted
1992	Tier 1	Veikkausliiga (Premier League)		Finnish FA (Suomen Palloliitto)	4th	
1993	Tier 1	Veikkausliiga (Premier League)		Finnish FA (Suomen Palloliitto)	2nd	Upper Group – 2nd
1994	Tier 1	Veikkausliiga (Premier League)		Finnish FA (Suomen Palloliitto)	2nd	
1995	Tier 1	Veikkausliiga (Premier League)		Finnish FA (Suomen Palloliitto)	2nd	
1996	Tier 1	Veikkausliiga (Premier League)		Finnish FA (Suomen Palloliitto)	6th	Upper Group – 2nd
1997	Tier 1	Veikkausliiga (Premier League)		Finnish FA (Suomen Palloliitto)	4th	Third Round – 5th
1998	Tier 1	Veikkausliiga (Premier League)		Finnish FA (Suomen Palloliitto)	6th	Third Round – 7th
1999	Tier 1	Veikkausliiga (Premier League)		Finnish FA (Suomen Palloliitto)	5th	Upper Group – 3rd
2000	Tier 1	Veikkausliiga (Premier League)		Finnish FA (Suomen Palloliitto)	3rd	
2001	Tier 1	Veikkausliiga (Premier League)		Finnish FA (Suomen Palloliitto)	3rd	
2002	Tier 1	Veikkausliiga (Premier League)		Finnish FA (Suomen Palloliitto)	2nd	Upper Group – 2nd
2003	Tier 1	Veikkausliiga (Premier League)		Finnish FA (Suomen Palloliitto)	4th	
2004	Tier 1	Veikkausliiga (Premier League)		Finnish FA (Suomen Palloliitto)	8th	
2005	Tier 1	Veikkausliiga (Premier League)		Finnish FA (Suomen Palloliitto)	1st	Champions
2006	Tier 1	Veikkausliiga (Premier League)		Finnish FA (Suomen Palloliitto)	6th	
2007	Tier 1	Veikkausliiga (Premier League)		Finnish FA (Suomen Palloliitto)	5th	
2008	Tier 1	Veikkausliiga (Premier League)		Finnish FA (Suomen Palloliitto)	5th	
2009	Tier 1	Veikkausliiga (Premier League)		Finnish FA (Suomen Palloliitto)	9th	
2010	Tier 1	Veikkausliiga (Premier League)		Finnish FA (Suomen Palloliitto)	9th	
2011	Tier 1	Veikkausliiga (Premier League)		Finnish FA (Suomen Palloliitto)	8th	
2012	Tier 1	Veikkausliiga (Premier League)		Finnish FA (Suomen Palloliitto)	6th	
2013	Tier 1	Veikkausliiga (Premier League)		Finnish FA (Suomen Palloliitto)	6th	
2014	Tier 1	Veikkausliiga (Premier League)		Finnish FA (Suomen Palloliitto)	8th	Bankruptcy
2015	Closed					
2016	Closed					
2017	Tier 4	Kolmonen (Third Division)	South-East Finland Group	Southeast Finland (SPL Kaakkois-Suomi)	1st	Promoted
2018	Tier 3	Kakkonen (Second Division)	Group A	Finnish FA (Suomen Palloliitto)	1st	Promoted
2019	Tier 2	Ykkönen (First Division)		Finnish FA (Suomen Palloliitto)	9th	
2020	Tier 2	Ykkönen (First Division)		Finnish FA (Suomen Palloliitto)	12th	Relegated
2021	Tier 3	Kakkonen (Second Division)	Group A	Finnish FA (Suomen Palloliitto)	11th	Relegated
2022	Tier 4	Kolmonen (Third Division)	South-East Finland Group B	Southeast Finland (SPL Kaakkois-Suomi)	2nd	
2023	Tier 4	Kolmonen (Third Division)	South-East Finland Group B	Southeast Finland (SPL Kaakkois-Suomi)	1st	Promoted
2024	Tier 4 (Note: Kakkonen switched from tier 3 to tier 4 after the adaptation of Ykkösliiga as the new tier 2 division.)	Kakkonen (Second Division)	Group A	Finnish FA (Suomen Palloliitto)	7th	
2025	Tier 4	Kakkonen (Second Division)	Group A	Finnish FA (Suomen Palloliitto)	5th	
2026	Tier 4	Kakkonen (Second Division)	Group A	Finnish FA (Suomen Palloliitto)		

- 24 seasons in first tier \ Veikkausliiga, mestaruussarja
- 20 seasons in second tier \ Ykkönen, I divisioona
- 23 seasons in third tier \ Kakkonen, II divisioona, Maakuntasarja
- 11 seasons in fourth tier \ Kakkonen, Kolmonen, Aluesarja, Piirinsarja

== Players ==
As of 13 April 2026

Note: Flags indicate national team as defined under FIFA eligibility rules; some limited exceptions apply. Players may hold more than one non-FIFA nationality.

No.	Pos.	Nation	Player
1	GK	FIN	Lassi Laine
2	DF	FIN	Vili Ekman
3	DF	FIN	Joosua Erjanko
4	DF	FIN	Onni Eskelinen
5	DF	FIN	Juhani Rauos
6	DF	FIN	Miro Köykkä
7	FW	FIN	Daniel Kaiga
8	DF	FIN	Niko Ritola
9	FW	FIN	Otto Haimi
10	FW	FIN	Tomi Räikkönen
11	MF	FIN	Mohammed Ahmed
13	DF	FIN	Olli Kähkönen
14	FW	FIN	Veeti Piira
15	MF	FIN	Sasu Hernesniemi

No.	Pos.	Nation	Player
17	FW	FIN	Otto Heimonen
18	FW	FIN	Aleksi Onatsu
19	MF	FIN	Kasperi Ahola
20	MF	FIN	Aapeli Saarelainen
21	DF	FIN	Kasper Mehtojärvi
25	GK	FIN	Mico Vanhala
26	FW	FIN	Khalid Kaddouri
27	MF	FIN	Veikko Turunen
28	MF	FIN	Onni Rauhala
37	FW	FIN	Veeti Niemi
61	DF	FIN	Veeti Karppanen
77	DF	FIN	Joona Kuismala
87	FW	FIN	Väinö Hietala
99	GK	FIN	Antti Kaikkonen

== Management ==
=== Coaching staff ===
Updated 13 April 2026

Name	Role
(Finland) Miika Kuntonen	Manager
(Finland) Jari Hassel	Coach
(Finland) Markus Mehtojärvi	Coach
(Finland) Antti Kaikkonen	Goalkeeping coach

== Managers ==
- (Finland) Teemu Pälli (1948)
- (Finland) Aki Ruotsalainen (1949–1952)
- (Finland) Arvo Lavenius (1953–1954)
- (Finland) Ensio Mustajärvi (1955–1956)
- (Finland) Jaakko Toikander (1956, 1964–1973)
- ??? (1957-1960)
- (Finland) Aimo Kinnunen (1961-1962)
- (Finland) Jaakko Tuomi (1963)
- (Finland) Olli Käppi (1974–1975)
- (Finland) Erkki Jauhiainen (1976–1978)
- (Finland) Aarne Olkkola (1979–1981)
- (Finland) Jorma Ovaska (1981–1982)
- (Finland) Rauno Ruotsalainen (1983–1986)
- (Scotland) Billy Hodgson (1987–1990)
- (Finland) Harri Kampman (1991–96)
- (Finland) Timo Liekoski (1997)
- (Finland) Juha Malinen (1998–2003)
- (Finland) Ilkka Mäkelä (Jan 2004 – Aug 2007)
- (Finland) Janne Hyppönen (Aug 2007 – Sept 2008)
- (Finland) Janne Lindberg (Sept 2008 – Dec 2010)
- (Finland) Toni Korkeakunnas (Jan 2011 – Sept 2013)
- (Finland) Antti Muurinen (Sept 2013 – Feb 2015)
- (Finland) Jukka Karjalainen (Apr 2017 – Nov 2019)
- (Finland) Ilkka Mäkelä (Jan 2020 – Sep 2020)
- (Finland) Marko Honkanen (Sep 2020 – Nov 2021)
- (Finland) Jyrki Saarela (Nov 2021 – Oct 2023)
- (Finland) Mika Pasanen (Oct 2023 – Sep 2024)
- (Finland) Miika Kuntonen (Sep 2024 –)

== Kits ==
Kit supplier	Period
(United Kingdom) Umbro	?–1993
(United States) Reebok	1994–1996
(United States) Nike	1997–2009
(Germany) Puma	2010–2013
(United Kingdom) Umbro	2014
(Sweden) Craft	2017–2020
(Italy) Macron	2021–present
