= Marcel Müller (footballer) =

Swiss footballer (born 1972)

Personal information
- Date of birth: 7 September 1972 (age 54)
- Position: Midfielder

Senior career*
Years	Team	Apps	(Gls)
1994–1995	FC Wil 1900		
1996–1998	FC Vaduz		
1998–2000	FC Widnau		
2000–2002	FC Vaduz		
2002–2006	FC Balzers		
2007–2008	FC Altstetten ZH		
2008–2009	FC Herisau		
- * Club domestic league appearances and goals

Marcel Müller (born 7 September 1972) is a retired Swiss football midfielder.
