= Damir Maretić =

Croatian footballer (born 1969)

Personal information
- Date of birth: 2 March 1969 (age 57)
- Place of birth: Split, SR Croatia, SFR Yugoslavia
- Height: 1.79 m (5 ft 10 in)
- Position: Midfielder

Senior career*
Years	Team	Apps	(Gls)
1992–1993	Zadar		
1993	Belišće	10	(0)
1996–1997	Varteks	26	(0)
1995–1996	→ Budućnost Hodošan (loan)		
1998	Budućnost Hodošan		
1998–1999	Pogoń Szczecin	11	(1)
1999–2000	Dinara		
2000–2002	Domžale		
- * Club domestic league appearances and goals

Damir Maretić (born 2 March 1969) is a Croatian former professional footballer who played as a midfielder.
