= Lumír Mistr =

Former footballer (born 1969)

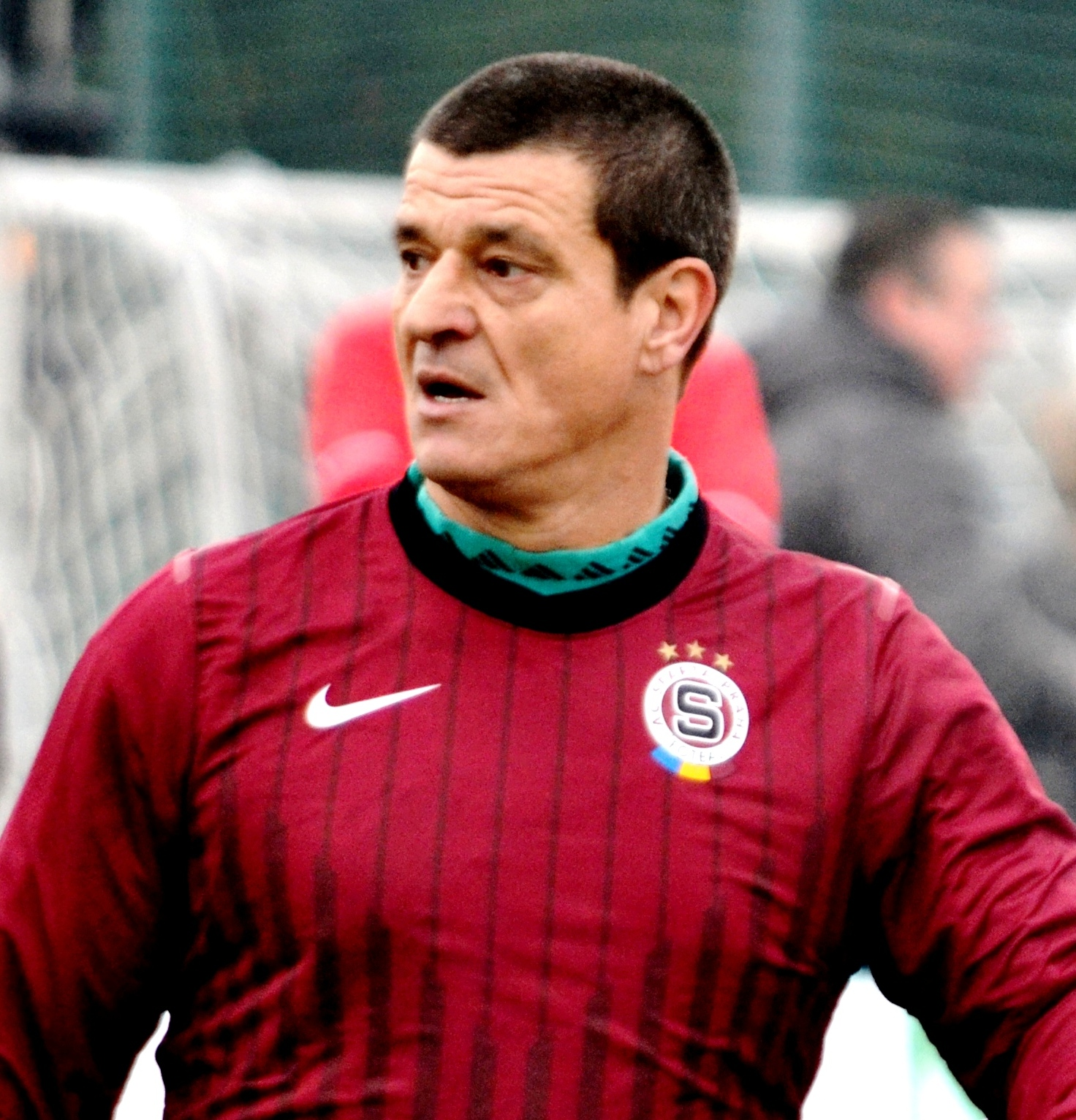

Personal information
- Date of birth: 12 January 1969 (age 57)
- Position: Midfielder

Senior career*
Years	Team	Apps	(Gls)
1988–1991	RH Cheb/Union Cheb	36	(4)
1991–1998	Sparta Prague	116	(23)
1999	Dukla Příbram	8	(0)
1999	Aris Thessaloniki	4	(0)

International career
1992	Czechoslovakia	2	(0)
- * Club domestic league appearances and goals

Lumír Mistr (born 12 January 1969) is a Czech former professional footballer who played as a midfielder. In league competition he made 160 appearances and scored 28 goals across three clubs.

== Biography ==
Mistr won five league titles with Sparta Prague where he spent most of his career: the 1992–93 Czechoslovak title, followed by four Czech titles in 1994, 1995, 1997 and 1998. A skillful midfielder, Mistr was the integral part of the club which won 1–0 against FC Barcelona at the 1991–92 European Cup on 1 April 1992.

Mistr retired from playing at the age of 30 due to multiple health issues. He is married with two daughters. In August 2018, Mistr became a grandfather as his youngest daughter gave birth to a girl.

As of 2022, Mistr was working as a security guard at a workwear company's premises in the Radotín district of Prague.
