= Nissan Kapeta =

Israeli footballer

Nissan Kapeta ניסן קאפטה
Personal information
- Full name: Nissim Kapeta
- Date of birth: December 28, 1972 (age 53)
- Place of birth: Rishon LeZion, Israel
- Position: Striker

Youth career
- 1981–1990: Hapoel Ironi Rishon LeZion

Senior career*
Years	Team	Apps	(Gls)
1990–2003	Hapoel Ironi Rishon LeZion	292	(106)
2001–2003	→ Bnei Yehuda (loan)	18	(8)
2003–2004	Hapoel Tzafririm Holon		
2004–2005	A.S. Ramat Eliyahu		
2005	Hapoel Nahlat Yehuda		
2005–2006	Maccabi Shikun HaMizrah		
2006–2007	Hapoel Ironi Rishon LeZion	2	(1)
- * Club domestic league appearances and goals

Nissan Kapeta (Hebrew: ניסן קאפטה; born December 28, 1972) is a former Israeli football (soccer) player.

== Honours ==
- Israeli Third Division:
  - Winner (1): 1991–92
- Israeli Second Division:
  - Winner (1): 1993–94
  - Runner-up (1): 2001–02
- Israel State Cup:
  - Runner-up (1): 1996
