= Jozef Valkučák =

Slovak footballer

Personal information
- Date of birth: 10 July 1966 (age 60)
- Position: Midfielder

Senior career*
Years	Team	Apps	(Gls)
1987–1992	Dukla Banská Bystrica		
1993–1997	1. HFC Humenné		
1998–1999	1. FC Tatran Prešov		
2000	BV Cloppenburg		
2000–2001	1. FC Tatran Prešov		
- * Club domestic league appearances and goals

Jozef Valkučák (born 10 July 1966) is a retired Slovak football midfielder.
