= 1997–98 FC Hansa Rostock season =

FC Hansa Rostock
1997–98 season
- Manager: Ewald Lienen
- Bundesliga: 6th
- DFB-Pokal: First round

== Season summary ==
Hansa finished sixth and qualified for the Intertoto Cup.

== First-team squad ==
Squad at end of season

Note: Flags indicate national team as defined under FIFA eligibility rules; some limited exceptions apply. Players may hold more than one non-FIFA nationality.

No.	Pos.	Nation	Player
1	GK	GER	Martin Pieckenhagen
2	MF	GER	Timo Lange
4	MF	GER	Jens Dowe
5	DF	GER	Uwe Ehlers
7	MF	GER	Martin Groth
8	MF	GER	Hilmar Weilandt
9	MF	MKD	Toni Micevski
10	FW	GER	Enrico Röver
12	DF	EGY	Yasser Radwan
13	MF	MKD	Borislav Tomovski
14	FW	BIH	Sergej Barbarez
15	DF	GER	Ralf Ewen

No.	Pos.	Nation	Player
16	DF	GER	Thomas Gansauge
17	DF	GER	Heiko März
18	MF	POL	Sławomir Majak
19	MF	GER	Stefan Studer
20	FW	GER	Steffen Baumgart
21	GK	GER	Daniel Klewer
22	FW	CRO	Igor Pamić
24	DF	GER	Marco Laaser
25	DF	GER	Marco Zallmann
26	GK	GER	Perry Bräutigam
27	FW	SUI	Oliver Neuville (Note: Neuville was born in Locarno, Switzerland, but also qualified to represent Germany and Italy internationally through his father and mother respectively, and would make his international debut for Germany in September 1998.)
33	DF	GER	Marko Rehmer

=== Left club during season ===
Note: Flags indicate national team as defined under FIFA eligibility rules; some limited exceptions apply. Players may hold more than one non-FIFA nationality.

No.	Pos.	Nation	Player
3	DF	GER	Christian Beeck (to Fortuna Düsseldorf)
6	MF	GER	Thomas Ziemer (to 1. FC Nürnberg)

No.	Pos.	Nation	Player
11	MF	POL	Sławomir Chałaśkiewicz (to Carl Zeiss Jena)

== Competitions ==
=== Bundesliga ===
==== League table ====
Pos	Team	Pld	W	D	L	GF	GA	GD	Pts	Qualification or relegation
4	VfB Stuttgart	34	14	10	10	55	49	+6	52	Qualification to UEFA Cup first round
5	Schalke 04	34	13	13	8	38	32	+6	52	Qualification to UEFA Cup first round
6	Hansa Rostock	34	14	9	11	54	46	+8	51	Qualification to Intertoto Cup third round
7	Werder Bremen	34	14	8	12	43	47	−4	50	Qualification to Intertoto Cup second round
8	MSV Duisburg	34	11	11	12	43	44	−1	44	Qualification to Cup Winners' Cup first round (Note: As domestic cup winners Bayern Munich had qualified for UEFA Champions League, their place in the Cup Winners' Cup was transferred to finalists Duisburg.)

Source: www.dfb.de
Rules for classification: 1) points; 2) goal difference; 3) number of goals scored.

=== DFB-Pokal ===
16 August 1997 First round	Hansa Rostock	0–2	Bayer Leverkusen	Rostock
		Report (in German)	N. Kovač 62'; Kirsten 77'	Stadium: Ostseestadion; Attendance: 5,000; Referee: Uwe Kemmling (Kleinburgwedel)
