= 1999–2000 Bayer 04 Leverkusen season =

Bayer 04 Leverkusen
1999–2000 season
- Head coach: Christoph Daum
- Stadium: BayArena
- Bundesliga: 2nd
- DFB-Pokal: Third round
- DFB-Ligapokal: Semi-finals
- UEFA Champions League: First group stage
- UEFA Cup: Third round
- Top goalscorer: League: Ulf Kirsten (17); All: Ulf Kirsten (23)
- Average home league attendance: 22,500
Home colours	Away colours

The 1999–2000 season was the 96th season in the history of Bayer 04 Leverkusen and the club's 21st consecutive season in the top flight of German football. In addition to the domestic league, Leverkusen participated in this season's editions of the DFB-Pokal, the UEFA Champions League, and the UEFA Cup.

== Pre-season and friendlies ==
Win Draw Loss

== Competitions ==
=== Overall record ===
Competition	First match	Last match	Starting round	Final position	Record							
Competition	First match	Last match	Starting round	Final position	Pld	W	D	L	GF	GA	GD	Win %
Bundesliga	13 August 1999	20 May 2000	Matchday 1	2nd	34	21	10	3	74	36	+38	61.76
DFB-Pokal	12 October 1999		Third round	Third round	1	0	0	1	2	3	−1	0.00
DFB-Ligapokal	10 July 1999	13 July 1999	Preliminary round	Semi-finals	2	1	0	1	4	3	+1	50.00
UEFA Champions League	14 September 1999	2 November 1999	First group stage	First group stage	6	1	4	1	7	7	+0	16.67
UEFA Cup	23 November 1999	9 December 1999	Third round	Third round	2	1	0	1	2	2	+0	50.00
Total					45	24	14	7	89	51	+38	53.33

Source: Competitions

=== Bundesliga ===
==== League table ====
Pos	Team	Pld	W	D	L	GF	GA	GD	Pts	Qualification or relegation
1	Bayern Munich (C)	34	22	7	5	73	28	+45	73	Qualification to Champions League group stage
2	Bayer Leverkusen	34	21	10	3	74	36	+38	73	Qualification to Champions League group stage
3	Hamburger SV	34	16	11	7	63	39	+24	59	Qualification to Champions League third qualifying round
4	1860 Munich	34	14	11	9	55	48	+7	53	Qualification to Champions League third qualifying round
5	1. FC Kaiserslautern	34	15	5	14	54	59	−5	50	Qualification to UEFA Cup first round

Source: www.dfb.de
Rules for classification: 1) points; 2) goal difference; 3) number of goals scored.
(C) Champions

==== Results summary ====
Overall								Home						Away					
Pld	W	D	L	GF	GA	GD	Pts	W	D	L	GF	GA	GD	W	D	L	GF	GA	GD
34	21	10	3	74	36	+38	73	13	4	0	44	17	+27	8	6	3	30	19	+11

Source: DFB

==== Results by round ====
Round	1	2	3	4	5	6	7	8	9	10	11	12	13	14	15	16	17	18	19	20	21	22	23	24	25	26	27	28	29	30	31	32	33	34
Ground	A	H	A	H	A	H	A	H	A	H	A	H	A	H	H	A	H	H	A	H	A	H	A	H	A	H	A	H	A	H	A	A	H	A
Result	D	W	W	W	D	W	L	W	D	D	D	D	W	W	D	W	W	W	L	W	D	W	W	W	W	D	W	W	D	W	W	W	W	L
Position	11	4	3	2	1	1	3	3	3	4	4	3	2	2	2	2	2	2	2	2	2	2	2	2	2	2	1	1	2	1	1	1	1	2

Source: DFB
A = Away; H = Home; W = Win; D = Draw; L = Loss

==== Matches ====
13 August 1999 1	MSV Duisburg	0–0	Bayer Leverkusen	Duisburg
20:00 CEST (UTC+2)				Stadium: Wedaustadion

22 August 1999 2	Bayer Leverkusen	2–0	Bayern Munich	Leverkusen
17:30 CEST (UTC+2)				Stadium: BayArena

28 August 1999 3	VfB Stuttgart	1–3	Bayer Leverkusen	Stuttgart
15:30 CEST (UTC+2)				Stadium: Gottlieb-Daimler-Stadion

11 September 1999 4	Bayer Leverkusen	3–2	Schalke 04	Leverkusen
15:30 CEST (UTC+2)				Stadium: BayArena

18 September 1999 5	Hertha BSC	0–0	Bayer Leverkusen	Berlin
15:30 CEST (UTC+2)				Stadium: Olympiastadion

26 September 1999 6	Bayer Leverkusen	3–1	1. FC Kaiserslautern	Leverkusen
17:30 CEST (UTC+2)				Stadium: BayArena

2 October 1999 7	VfL Wolfsburg	3–1	Bayer Leverkusen	Wolfsburg
15:30 CEST (UTC+2)				Stadium: VfL-Stadion am Elsterweg

15 October 1999 8	Bayer Leverkusen	4–1	SSV Ulm 1846	Leverkusen
20:00 CEST (UTC+2)				Stadium: BayArena

23 October 1999 9	SC Freiburg	0–0	Bayer Leverkusen	Freiburg
15:30 CEST (UTC+2)				Stadium: Dreisamstadion

30 October 1999 10	Bayer Leverkusen	1–1	1860 Munich	Leverkusen
15:30 CEST (UTC+2)				Stadium: BayArena

6 November 1999 11	Borussia Dortmund	1–1	Bayer Leverkusen	Dortmund
15:30 CEST (UTC+2)				Stadium: Westfalenstadion

20 November 1999 12	Bayer Leverkusen	1–1	Hansa Rostock	Leverkusen
15:30 CEST (UTC+2)				Stadium: BayArena

27 November 1999 13	Arminia Bielefeld	1–2	Bayer Leverkusen	Bielefeld
15:30 CEST (UTC+2)				Stadium: Bielefelder Alm

4 December 1999 14	Bayer Leverkusen	3–2	Werder Bremen	Leverkusen
15:30 CEST (UTC+2)				Stadium: BayArena

12 December 1999 15	Bayer Leverkusen	2–2	Hamburger SV	Leverkusen
17:30 CEST (UTC+2)				Stadium: BayArena

15 December 1999 16	Eintracht Frankfurt	1–2	Bayer Leverkusen	Frankfurt
20:00 CEST (UTC+2)				Stadium: Waldstadion

18 December 1999 17	Bayer Leverkusen	2–1	SpVgg Unterhaching	Leverkusen
17:30 CEST (UTC+2)				Stadium: BayArena

5 February 2000 18	Bayer Leverkusen	3–0	MSV Duisburg	Leverkusen
15:30 CEST (UTC+2)				Stadium: BayArena

9 February 2000 19	FC Bayern Munich	4–1	Bayer Leverkusen	Munich
20:00 CEST (UTC+2)				Stadium: Olympiastadion

12 February 2000 20	Bayer Leverkusen	1–0	VfB Stuttgart	Leverkusen
15:30 CEST (UTC+2)				Stadium: BayArena

18 February 2000 21	Schalke 04	1–1	Bayer Leverkusen	Gelsenkirchen
20:00 CEST (UTC+2)				Stadium: Arena AufSchalke

26 February 2000 22	Bayer Leverkusen	3–1	Hertha BSC	Leverkusen
15:30 CEST (UTC+2)				Stadium: BayArena

4 March 2000 23	1. FC Kaiserslautern	1–3	Bayer Leverkusen	Kaiserslautern
15:30 CEST (UTC+2)				Stadium: Fritz-Walter-Stadion

11 March 2000 24	Bayer Leverkusen	4–1	VfL Wolfsburg	Leverkusen
15:30 CEST (UTC+2)				Stadium: BayArena

18 March 2000 25	SSV Ulm 1846	1–9	Bayer Leverkusen	Ulm
15:30 CEST (UTC+2)				Stadium: Donaustadion

25 March 2000 26	Bayer Leverkusen	1–1	SC Freiburg	Leverkusen
15:30 CEST (UTC+2)				Stadium: BayArena

1 April 2000 27	1860 Munich	1–2	Bayer Leverkusen	Munich
15:30 CEST (UTC+2)				Stadium: Olympiastadion

8 April 2000 28	Bayer Leverkusen	3–1	Borussia Dortmund	Leverkusen
15:30 CEST (UTC+2)				Stadium: BayArena

12 April 2000 29	Hansa Rostock	1–1	Bayer Leverkusen	Rostock
20:00 CEST (UTC+2)		Report		Stadium: Ostseestadion

16 April 2000 30	Bayer Leverkusen	4–1	Arminia Bielefeld	Leverkusen
17:30 CEST (UTC+2)		Report		Stadium: BayArena

20 April 2000 31	Werder Bremen	1–3	Bayer Leverkusen	Bremen
20:00 CEST (UTC+2)		Report		Stadium: Weserstadion

30 April 2000 32	Hamburger SV	0–2	Bayer Leverkusen	Hamburg
17:30 CEST (UTC+2)		Report		Stadium: Volksparkstadion

13 May 2000 33	Bayer Leverkusen	4–1	Eintracht Frankfurt	Leverkusen
15:30 CEST (UTC+2)	Neuville 10'; Kirsten 56'; Rink 72'; Beinlich 81' (pen.)	Report	Kracht 40'	Stadium: BayArena; Attendance: 22,500; Referee: Markus Merk

20 May 2000 34	SpVgg Unterhaching	2–0	Bayer Leverkusen	Unterhaching
15:30 CEST (UTC+2)	Ballack 20' (o.g.); Oberleitner 72'	Report		Stadium: Sportpark Unterhaching; Attendance: 11,300; Referee: Herbert Fandel

=== DFB-Pokal ===
12 October 1999 Third round	Waldhof Mannheim	3–2 (a.e.t.)	Bayer Leverkusen	Mannheim
--:-- CEST (UTC+2)	Schwinkendorf 26'; Licht 83'; Klausz 105'		Ponte 10'; Beinlich 78'	Stadium: Carl-Benz-Stadion; Attendance: 15,000; Referee: Edgar Steinborn

=== UEFA Champions League ===
==== Group stage ====
Pos	Team	Pld	W	D	L	GF	GA	GD	Pts	Qualification
1	(Italy) Lazio	6	4	2	0	13	3	+10	14	Advance to second group stage
2	(Ukraine) Dynamo Kyiv	6	2	1	3	8	8	0	7	Advance to second group stage
3	(Germany) Bayer Leverkusen	6	1	4	1	7	7	0	7	Transfer to UEFA Cup
4	(Slovenia) Maribor	6	1	1	4	2	12	−10	4	

Source: UEFA
