= 1993–94 in Swiss football =

Football in Switzerland
- Season: 1993–94

Men's football
- Nationalliga A: Servette
- Nationalliga B: Basel
- 1. Liga: Group 1: FC Naters; Group 2: SV Lyss; Group 3: SC Young Fellows Juventus; Group 4: FC Tuggen
- Swiss Cup: Grasshopper Club

Women's football
- Swiss Women's Super League: SV Seebach Zürich
- Swiss Women's Cup: DFC Bern

The following is a summary of the 1993–94 season of competitive football in Switzerland.

== Nationalliga A ==
=== Qualification phase ===
Pos	Team	Pld	W	D	L	GF	GA	GD	Pts	Qualification
1	Grasshopper Club	22	12	7	3	37	15	+22	43	Advance to championship round halved points (rounded up) as bonus
2	Sion	22	11	9	2	34	14	+20	42	Advance to championship round halved points (rounded up) as bonus
3	Young Boys	22	9	7	6	37	25	+12	34	Advance to championship round halved points (rounded up) as bonus
4	Servette	22	9	7	6	38	37	+1	34	Advance to championship round halved points (rounded up) as bonus
5	Lausanne-Sport	22	9	6	7	28	27	+1	33	Advance to championship round halved points (rounded up) as bonus
6	Lugano	22	7	8	7	23	27	−4	29	Advance to championship round halved points (rounded up) as bonus
7	Luzern	22	8	5	9	26	32	−6	29	Advance to championship round halved points (rounded up) as bonus
8	Aarau	22	8	5	9	24	31	−7	29	Advance to championship round halved points (rounded up) as bonus
9	Zürich	22	6	8	8	25	22	+3	26	Continue to promotion/relegation round
10	Xamax	22	4	9	9	24	31	−7	21	Continue to promotion/relegation round
11	Yverdon-Sport	22	3	8	11	19	33	−14	17	Continue to promotion/relegation round
12	Kriens	22	3	7	12	17	38	−21	16	Continue to promotion/relegation round

Source: rsssf.com
Rules for classification: 1) Points; 2) Goal difference; 3) Goals scored; 4) Head-to-head points; 5) Away goals scored; 6) Draw.

=== Championship group ===
The first eight teams of the qualification phase competed in the Championship round. The teams took half of the points (rounded up to complete units) gained in the qualification as bonus with them.

Pos	Team	Pld	W	D	L	GF	GA	GD	BP	Pts	Qualification
1	Servette	14	8	5	1	29	14	+15	13	34	Swiss champions, qualified for 1994–95 Champions League and entered 1994 Intertoto Cup
2	Grasshopper Club	14	6	5	3	28	17	+11	16	33	Swiss Cup winners, qualified for 1994–95 Cup Winners' Cup and entered 1994 Intertoto Cup
3	Sion	14	5	5	4	21	15	+6	16	31	qualified for 1994–95 UEFA Cup first round and entered 1994 Intertoto Cup
4	Aarau	14	7	4	3	23	16	+7	11	29	qualified for 1994–95 UEFA Cup preliminary round
5	Lugano	14	5	5	4	21	19	+2	11	26	
6	Young Boys	14	2	6	6	13	23	−10	13	23	entered 1994 Intertoto Cup
7	Lausanne-Sport	14	4	1	9	14	28	−14	12	21	entered 1994 Intertoto Cup
8	Luzern	14	2	3	9	15	32	−17	11	18	

Source: rsssf.com
Rules for classification: 1) points; 2) Position in the qualification.

== Nationalliga B ==
=== Qualification phase ===
Group West

Pos	Team	Pld	W	D	L	GF	GA	GD	Pts	Qualification
1	FC Schaffhausen	18	13	3	2	41	21	+20	29	Advance to promotion/relegation NLA/LNB round
2	St. Gallen	18	9	5	4	35	21	+14	23	Advance to promotion/relegation NLA/LNB round
3	Baden	18	9	3	6	38	30	+8	21	Continue to relegation round NLB/1. Liga according to their rank, the teams would receive bonus points in the next stage
4	Bellinzona	18	8	5	5	33	30	+3	21	Continue to relegation round NLB/1. Liga according to their rank, the teams would receive bonus points in the next stage
5	Locarno	18	7	6	5	23	20	+3	20	Continue to relegation round NLB/1. Liga according to their rank, the teams would receive bonus points in the next stage
6	Chiasso	18	6	5	7	15	23	−8	17	Continue to relegation round NLB/1. Liga according to their rank, the teams would receive bonus points in the next stage
7	Winterthur	18	5	5	8	29	35	−6	15	Continue to relegation round NLB/1. Liga according to their rank, the teams would receive bonus points in the next stage
8	Wil	18	4	6	8	20	22	−2	14	Continue to relegation round NLB/1. Liga according to their rank, the teams would receive bonus points in the next stage
9	Gossau	18	1	9	8	15	29	−14	11	Continue to relegation round NLB/1. Liga according to their rank, the teams would receive bonus points in the next stage
10	FC Sursee	18	2	5	11	16	34	−18	9	Continue to relegation round NLB/1. Liga according to their rank, the teams would receive bonus points in the next stage

Source: rsssf.com
Rules for classification: 1) Points; 2) Goal difference; 3) Goals scored; 4) Head-to-head points; 5) Away goals scored; 6) Draw.

Group East

Pos	Team	Pld	W	D	L	GF	GA	GD	Pts	Qualification
1	Étoile Carouge	18	11	5	2	33	13	+20	27	Advance to promotion/relegation NLA/LNB round
2	Basel	18	12	1	5	39	14	+25	25	Advance to promotion/relegation NLA/LNB round
3	Chênois	18	8	6	4	31	20	+11	22	Continue to relegation round NLB/1. Liga according to their rank, the teams would receive bonus points in the next stage
4	Old Boys	18	6	8	4	27	31	−4	20	Continue to relegation round NLB/1. Liga according to their rank, the teams would receive bonus points in the next stage
5	Monthey	18	6	6	6	25	23	+2	18	Continue to relegation round NLB/1. Liga according to their rank, the teams would receive bonus points in the next stage
6	Bulle	18	7	3	8	28	24	+4	17	Continue to relegation round NLB/1. Liga according to their rank, the teams would receive bonus points in the next stage
7	Grenchen	18	7	3	8	25	24	+1	17	Continue to relegation round NLB/1. Liga according to their rank, the teams would receive bonus points in the next stage
8	Delémont	18	7	3	8	24	29	−5	17	Continue to relegation round NLB/1. Liga according to their rank, the teams would receive bonus points in the next stage
9	Fribourg	18	6	1	11	21	28	−7	13	Continue to relegation round NLB/1. Liga according to their rank, the teams would receive bonus points in the next stage
10	Urania Genève Sport	18	2	0	16	11	58	−47	4	Continue to relegation round NLB/1. Liga according to their rank, the teams would receive bonus points in the next stage

Source: rsssf.com
Rules for classification: 1) Points; 2) Goal difference; 3) Goals scored; 4) Head-to-head points; 5) Away goals scored; 6) Draw.

=== Promotion/relegation group NLA/NLB ===
The teams in the ninth to twelfth positions in Nationalliga A competed with the top two teams of both Nationalliga B groups in a NLA/NLB promotion/relegation round.

Pos	Team	Pld	W	D	L	GF	GA	GD	Pts	Qualification or relegation
1	Basel	14	7	6	1	22	7	+15	20	Promoted to NLA 1994–95
2	St. Gallen	14	8	4	2	28	14	+14	20	Promoted to NLA 1994–95
3	Xamax	14	9	2	3	21	12	+9	20	Remain in NLA 1994–95
4	Zürich	14	7	4	3	24	15	+9	18	Remain in NLA 1994–95
5	Kriens	14	4	4	6	21	20	+1	12	Relegated to NLB 1994–95
6	Étoile Carouge	14	3	5	6	14	24	−10	11	Remain in NLB 1994–95
7	FC Schaffhausen	14	2	3	9	14	31	−17	7	Remain in NLB 1994–95
8	Yverdon-Sport	14	1	2	11	8	29	−21	4	Relegated to NLB 1994–95

Source: rsssf.com

=== Relegation group NLB/1. Liga ===
The last eight teams in each of the two qualification phase groups competed in two relegation groups against relegation to the 1. Liga 1994–95. The teams were drawn into these two groups and received ranking bonus points from their qualifying groups (3rd place 8 pts; 4th place 7 pts; 5th place 6 pts; etc). There was to be three direct relegations and a relegation play-out between the two fifth placed teams.

Group A

Pos	Team	Pld	W	D	L	GF	GA	GD	BP	Pts	Qualification or relegation
1	Baden	14	8	2	4	29	12	+17	8	26	Remain in NLB
2	Locarno	14	8	3	3	22	19	+3	6	25	Remain in NLB
3	Delémont	14	8	3	3	25	19	+6	3	22	Remain in NLB
4	Winterthur	14	6	4	4	28	24	+4	4	20	Remain in NLB
5	Gossau	14	7	2	5	21	13	+8	2	18	Play-out against relegation
6	Old Boys	14	4	2	8	17	24	−7	7	17	Relegation to 1. Liga 1994–95
7	Bulle	14	1	5	8	9	22	−13	5	12	Relegation to 1. Liga 1994–95
8	Urania Genève Sport	14	2	3	9	17	35	−18	1	8	Relegation to 1. Liga 1994–95

Source: RSSSF
Rules for classification: 1) Points; 2) Goal difference; 3) Goals scored; 4) Head-to-head points; 5) Away goals scored; 6) Draw.

Group B

Pos	Team	Pld	W	D	L	GF	GA	GD	BP	Pts	Qualification or relegation
1	Wil	14	9	3	2	22	12	+10	3	24	Remain in NLB
2	Chênois	14	6	4	4	18	15	+3	8	24	Remain in NLB
3	Grenchen	14	7	5	2	22	12	+10	4	23	Remain in NLB
4	Bellinzona	14	6	3	5	22	17	+5	7	22	Remain in NLB
5	Chiasso	14	4	7	3	17	9	+8	5	20	Play-out against relegation
6	Monthey	14	5	4	5	26	20	+6	6	20	Relegation to 1. Liga 1994–95
7	FC Sursee	14	3	3	8	13	27	−14	1	10	Relegation to 1. Liga 1994–95
8	Fribourg	14	1	1	12	9	37	−28	2	5	Relegation to 1. Liga 1994–95

Source: RSSSF
Rules for classification: 1) Points; 2) Goal difference; 3) Goals scored; 4) Head-to-head points; 5) Away goals scored; 6) Draw.

=== Play-out ===
Team 1	Score	Team 2
Gossau	1–0	Chiasso
Chiasso	1–1	Gossau

Gossau win 2–1 on aggregate. Chiasso is relegated to 1. Liga 1994–95.

== 1. Liga ==
=== Group 1 ===
Pos	Team	Pld	W	D	L	GF	GA	GD	Pts	Qualification or relegation
1	FC Naters	26	17	6	3	51	21	+30	40	Play-off to Challenge League
2	FC Echallens	26	13	10	3	55	36	+19	36	Play-off to Challenge League
3	FC Renens	26	16	2	8	53	31	+22	34	
4	FC Stade Nyonnais	26	10	10	6	41	34	+7	30	
5	Signal FC (Bernex)	26	12	6	8	42	38	+4	30	
6	FC Raron	26	10	6	10	43	39	+4	26	
7	FC Martigny-Sports	26	9	8	9	45	41	+4	26	
8	FC Stade Lausanne	26	10	4	12	36	38	−2	24	
9	FC Montreux-Sports	26	8	7	11	39	37	+2	23	
10	Grand-Lancy FC	26	8	7	11	45	52	−7	23	
11	Vevey Sports	26	8	7	11	28	40	−12	23	
12	FC Fully	26	7	5	14	43	48	−5	19	Play-out against relegation
13	FC Versoix	26	4	9	13	27	44	−17	17	Relegation to 2. Liga Interregional
14	FC Châtel-Saint-Denis	26	4	5	17	30	72	−42	13	Relegation to 2. Liga Interregional

Source: RSSSF
Rules for classification: 1) Points; 2) Goal difference within the league, but play-off for qualifiers.

=== Group 2 ===
Pos	Team	Pld	W	D	L	GF	GA	GD	Pts	Qualification or relegation
1	SV Lyss	26	17	3	6	45	33	+12	37	Play-off to Challenge League
2	FC Solothurn	26	16	2	8	57	35	+22	34	Play-off to Challenge League
3	FC Colombier	26	13	7	6	40	25	+15	33	
4	FC La Chaux-de-Fonds	26	13	6	7	56	35	+21	32	
5	FC Riehen	26	11	6	9	46	38	+8	28	
6	FC Moutier	26	13	2	11	48	48	0	28	
7	FC Serrières	26	11	3	12	48	44	+4	25	
8	FC Münsingen	26	9	6	11	25	28	−3	24	
9	FC Le Locle	26	7	10	9	37	48	−11	24	
10	FC Thun	26	7	9	10	41	45	−4	23	
11	SC Bümpliz 78	26	9	5	12	38	47	−9	23	
12	FC Pratteln	26	7	8	11	30	40	−10	22	Play-out against relegation
13	FC Laufen	26	7	4	15	24	39	−15	18	Relegation to 2. Liga Interregional
14	FC Concordia Basel	26	2	9	15	18	48	−30	13	Relegation to 2. Liga Interregional

Source: RSSSF
Rules for classification: 1) Points; 2) Goal difference within the league, but play-off for qualifiers.

=== Group 3 ===
Pos	Team	Pld	W	D	L	GF	GA	GD	Pts	Qualification or relegation
1	SC Young Fellows Juventus	26	18	3	5	56	17	+39	39	Play-off to Nationalliga B
2	SC Buochs	26	12	11	3	46	28	+18	35	Play-off to Nationalliga B
3	FC Emmenbrücke	26	14	6	6	47	32	+15	34	
4	FC Suhr	26	12	10	4	43	29	+14	34	
5	FC Klus-Balsthal	26	10	9	7	32	29	+3	29	
6	FC Red Star Zürich	26	9	6	11	38	42	−4	24	
7	FC Kölliken	26	8	8	10	31	43	−12	24	
8	FC Wiedikon	26	9	5	12	46	47	−1	23	
9	FC Muri	26	9	5	12	41	52	−11	23	
10	FC Frauenfeld	26	7	8	11	37	40	−3	22	
11	FC Altstetten (Zürich)	26	6	9	11	45	46	−1	21	To decider for play-out
12	Zug 94	26	6	9	11	27	39	−12	21	To decider for play-out
13	FC Wangen bei Olten	26	6	7	13	31	48	−17	19	Relegation to 2. Liga
14	FC Brüttisellen	26	3	10	13	24	52	−28	16	Relegation to 2. Liga

Source: RSSSF
Rules for classification: 1) Points; 2) Goal difference within the league, but play-off for qualifiers.

==== Decider ====
Decider for 11th/12th position. 12th position meant advance to play-out against relegation. The decider was played at a neutral ground. It took place in the Stadion Brühl in Muri, Aargau.

Team 1	Score	Team 2
FC Altstetten	0–1	Zug 94

Zug 94 win and remain in 1. Liga. Altstetten continue in play-outs.

=== Group 4 ===
Pos	Team	Pld	W	D	L	GF	GA	GD	Pts	Qualification or relegation
1	FC Tuggen	26	19	3	4	62	24	+38	41	Play-off to Nationalliga B
2	FC Ascona	26	17	5	4	64	31	+33	39	Play-off to Nationalliga B
3	SC Brühl	26	16	6	4	60	27	+33	38	
4	FC Glarus	26	14	7	5	56	37	+19	35	
5	FC Mendrisio	26	9	8	9	40	37	+3	26	
6	FC Tresa/Monteggio	26	8	9	9	38	38	0	25	
7	FC Stäfa	26	9	7	10	42	51	−9	25	
8	FC Chur	26	9	6	11	34	38	−4	24	
9	FC Vaduz	26	9	6	11	37	49	−12	24	
10	TSV St. Otmar St. Gallen	26	9	6	11	28	42	−14	24	
11	FC Freienbach	26	7	7	12	34	41	−7	21	
12	FC Rorschach	26	6	8	12	29	39	−10	20	Play-out against relegation
13	FC Wädenswil	26	4	4	18	29	57	−28	12	Relegation to 2. Liga
14	FC Altstätten (St. Gallen)	26	2	6	18	17	59	−42	10	Relegation to 2. Liga

Source: RSSSF
Rules for classification: 1) Points; 2) Goal difference within the league, but play-off for qualifiers.

=== Promotion play-offs ===
Qualification round

Team 1	Score	Team 2
FC Echallens	2–0	SV Lyss
SV Lyss	3–3	FC Echallens

FC Echallens win 5–3 on aggregate and continue to the finals.

Team 1	Score	Team 2
FC Solothurn	1–0	FC Naters
FC Naters	1–1	FC Solothurn

FC Solothurn win 2–1 on aggregate and continue to the finals.

Team 1	Score	Team 2
SC Buochs	1–4	FC Tuggen
FC Tuggen	3–2	SC Buochs

FC Tuggen win 7–3 on aggregate and continue to the finals.

Team 1	Score	Team 2
FC Ascona	0–1	SC Young Fellows Juventus
SC Young Fellows Juventus	1–2	FC Ascona

2–2 on aggregate. FC Ascona win on away goals and continue to the finals.

Final round

Team 1	Score	Team 2
FC Solothurn	1–1	FC Ascona
FC Ascona	1–3	FC Solothurn

FC Solothurn win 4–2 on aggregate and are promoted to Nationalliga B. FC Ascona continue in decider for 3rd place.

Team 1	Score	Team 2
FC Echallens	2–0	FC Tuggen
FC Tuggen	0–4	FC Echallens

FC Echallens win 6–0 on aggregate and are promoted to Nationalliga B. FC Tuggen continue in decider for 3rd place.

Decider for promotion

Team 1	Score	Team 2
FC Tuggen	2–0	FC Ascona

FC Tuggen win 2–0 and are promoted to Nationalliga B.

=== Relegation play-outs ===
Team 1	Score	Team 2
FC Pratteln	0–0	FC Fully
FC Fully	0–1	FC Pratteln

Pratteln win 1–0 on aggregate and remain in 1. Liga. Fully are relegated.

Team 1	Score	Team 2
FC Rorschach	0–1	FC Altstetten
FC Altstetten	1–1	FC Rorschach

Altstetten win 2–1 on aggregate and remain in 1. Liga. Rorschach are relegated.

== Swiss Cup ==
The routes of the finalists to the final, played on 15 May 1994 at the Wankdorf in Bern:

Round 3

Team 1	Score	Team 2
FC Freienbach	0–2	Grasshoppers
SC Brühl	0–3	FC Schaffhausen

Round 4

Team 1	Score	Team 2
FC Gossau	0–1	Grasshoppers
FC Suhr	0–2	FC Schaffhausen

Round 5

Team 1	Score	Team 2
FC Lugano	1–2	Grasshoppers
FC Schaffhausen	0–0 (a.e.t.) (p. 5–4)	SR Delémont

Quarter-finals

Team 1	Score	Team 2
FC Baden	1–5	Grasshoppers
FC Schaffhausen	3–1	BSC Old Boys

Semi-finals

Team 1	Score	Team 2
FC Zürich	1–2	Grasshoppers
FC Basel	0–0 (a.e.t.) (p. 5–6)	FC Schaffhausen

The winners of the first drawn semi-final is considered as home team in the final. Remark: FC Schaffhausen as a club from the NLB (second tier) in the final.

=== Final ===
15 May 1994
15:00

Grasshoppers	4 – 0	FC Schaffhausen
Bickel 5'; Vega 35'; Magnin 71', 77'	Report

Wankdorf, Bern
Attendance: 12,000
Referee: (Switzerland) Daniel Roduit (Châteauneuf)

== Swiss Clubs in Europe ==
- Aarau as 1992–93 Nationalliga A champions: 1993–94 UEFA Champions League preliminary round and entered 1993 Intertoto Cup
- Young Boys as league second placed team: 1993–94 UEFA Cup and entered 1993 Intertoto Cup
- Servette as league third placed team: 1993–94 UEFA Cup
- Lugano as 1992–93 Swiss Cup winners: 1993–94 Cup Winners' Cup qualifying round
- Zürich entered: 1993 Intertoto Cup
- Lausanne-Sport entered: 1993 Intertoto Cup
- Balzers as 1992–93 Liechtenstein Cup winners: 1993–94 Cup Winners' Cup qualifying round

=== Aarau ===
==== Champions League ====
===== Qualifying round =====
18 August 1993 First leg	Omonia (Cyprus)	2–1	(Switzerland) Aarau	Makario Stadium, Nicosia
19:00	Kizilashvili 15', 61'	Report	Ratinho 62'	Attendance: 14,268; Referee: Gheorghe Constantin (Romania)

1 September 1993 Second leg	Aarau (Switzerland)	2–0	(Cyprus) Omonia	Stadion Brügglifeld, Aarau
20:00	Stiel 7'; Heldmann 37'	Report		Attendance: 8,356; Referee: Hermann Albrecht (Germany)

Aarau won 3–2 on aggregate.

===== First round =====
15 September 1993 First leg	Aarau (Switzerland)	0–1	(Italy) Milan	Hardturm, Zürich
20:30		Report	Papin 54'	Attendance: 9,400; Referee: Alan Snoddy (Northern Ireland)

29 September 1993 Second leg	Milan (Italy)	0–0	(Switzerland) Aarau	San Siro, Milan
20:30		Report		Attendance: 58,993; Referee: Marc Batta (France)

Milan won 1–0 on aggregate.

==== Intertoto Cup ====
===== Group 8 =====
Pos	Team	Pld	W	D	L	GF	GA	GD	Pts
1	(Germany) Dynamo Dresden	4	2	2	0	4	1	+3	6
2	(Switzerland) Aarau	4	1	3	0	4	3	+1	5
3	(Austria) Wiener SC	4	1	2	1	5	4	+1	4
4	(Greece) Iraklis	4	1	1	2	5	7	−2	3
5	(Israel) Beitar Jerusalem	4	0	2	2	3	6	−3	2

=== Young Boys ===
==== UEFA Cup ====
===== First round =====
14 September 1993 First leg	BSC Young Boys (Switzerland)	0–0	(Scotland) Celtic	Bern
20:00 GMT		UEFA summary	(yellow card) 43' McNally	Stadium: Wankdorf Stadium; Attendance: 7,300

29 September 1993 Second leg	Celtic (Scotland)	1–0 (a.e.t.) (1–0 agg.)	(Switzerland) BSC Young Boys	Glasgow
20:00 GMT	Baumann 104' (o.g.)	UEFA summary	(yellow card) 72' Reich	Stadium: Celtic Park; Attendance: 18,876; Referee: Jef van Vliet (Netherlands)

Celtic won 1–0 on aggregate.

==== Intertoto Cup ====
===== Group 7 =====
Pos	Team	Pld	W	D	L	GF	GA	GD	Pts
1	(Switzerland) Young Boys	4	3	1	0	9	5	+4	7
2	(Czech Republic) Sigma Olomouc	4	3	0	1	5	2	+3	6
3	(Denmark) Aarhus	4	2	0	2	12	6	+6	4
4	Austria Salzburg	4	1	0	3	3	10	−7	2
5	(Romania) Oțelul Galați	4	0	1	3	4	10	−6	1

=== Servette ===
==== UEFA Cup ====
===== First round =====
14 September 1993 First leg	Crusaders (Northern Ireland)	0–0	(Switzerland) Servette	Seaview, north Belfast
21:00		UEFA summary

28 September 1993 Second leg	Servette (Switzerland)	4–0	(Northern Ireland) Crusaders	Stade des Charmilles, Geneva
20:00	Anderson 57'; Dunlop 58' (o.g.); Giallanza 60', 69'	UEFA summary		Attendance: 5,200; Referee: Lyube Spasov (Bulgaria)

Servette won 4–0 on aggregate.

===== Second round =====
19 October 1993 First leg	Bordeaux (France)	2–1	(Switzerland) Servette	Stade du Parc Lescure, Bordeaux
20:30	Paille 36'; Vercruysse 56'	UEFA summary	Anderson 55'	Attendance: 10,530; Referee: Alan Snoddy (Northern Ireland)

3 November 1993 Second leg	Servette (Switzerland)	0–1	(France) Bordeaux	Stade des Charmilles, Geneva
20:45		Report	Schepull 65' (o.g.)	Attendance: 18,000; Referee: Sergei Khusainov (Russia)

Bordeaux won 3–1 on aggregate.

=== Lugano ===
==== Cup Winners' Cup ====
===== Qualifying round =====
18 August 1993 First leg	Lugano (Switzerland)	5–0	(Belarus) Neman Grodno	Cornaredo Stadium, Lugano
19:00	Andreoli 37', 83'; Subiat 59'; Fink 68'; Penzavalli 85'	Report		Attendance: 6,000; Referee: Rémi Harrel (France)

1 September 1993 Second leg	Neman Grodno (Belarus)	2–1	(Switzerland) Lugano	Dinamo Stadium, Minsk
19:00	Solodovnikov 60'; Mazurchik 69'	Report	Subiat 29'	Attendance: 2,000; Referee: Václav Krondl (Czech Republic)

Lugano won 6–2 on aggregate.

===== First round =====
14 September 1993 First Leg	Real Madrid (Spain)	3–0	(Switzerland) FC Lugano	Madrid, Spain
	Dubovský 44'; Míchel 67' (pen.); Fernandez 71' (o.g.)	Report		Stadium: Santiago Bernabéu; Attendance: 37,600; Referee: Dick Jol (Netherlands)

29 September 1993 Second Leg	FC Lugano (Switzerland)	1–3 (1–6 agg.)	(Spain) Real Madrid	Zürich, Switzerland
	Subiat 61'	Report	Hierro 41'; Zamorano 77', 88'	Stadium: Letzigrund; Attendance: 8,000; Referee: Gerald Ashby (England)

Real won 6–1 on aggregate.

=== Zürich ===
==== Intertoto Cup ====
===== Group 6 =====
Pos	Team	Pld	W	D	L	GF	GA	GD	Pts
1	(Switzerland) Zürich	4	2	1	1	7	5	+2	5
2	(Slovakia) Slovan Bratislava	4	2	1	1	8	8	0	5
3	(Austria) Tirol Innsbruck	4	1	2	1	5	4	+1	4
4	(Germany) VfL Bochum	4	1	2	1	5	5	0	4
5	(Denmark) Silkeborg IF	4	0	2	2	4	7	−3	2

=== Lausanne-Sport ===
==== Intertoto Cup ====
===== Group 3 =====
Pos	Team	Pld	W	D	L	GF	GA	GD	Pts
1	(Sweden) IFK Norrköping	4	3	0	1	11	6	+5	6
2	(Switzerland) Lausanne-Sport	4	3	0	1	11	6	+5	6
3	Austria Wien	4	3	0	1	7	2	+5	6
4	(Poland) Pogoń Szczecin	4	1	0	3	5	11	−6	2
5	(Denmark) Copenhagen	4	0	0	4	2	11	−9	0

=== Balzers ===
==== Cup Winners' Cup ====
===== Qualifying round =====
15 August 1993 First leg	Balzers (Liechtenstein)	3–1	(Albania) Albpetrol Patos	Sportplatz Rheinau, Balzers
16:30	Nushöhr 31'; M. Frick 53', 86'	Report	Poçi 37'	Attendance: 1,600; Referee: Roman Steindl (Austria)

31 August 1993 Second leg	Albpetrol Patos (Albania)	0–0	(Liechtenstein) Balzers	Qemal Stafa Stadium, Tirana
16:30		Report		Attendance: 1,250; Referee: Darko Jamšek (Slovenia)

Balzers won 3–1 on aggregate.

===== First round =====
15 September 1993 First leg	CSKA Sofia (Bulgaria)	8–0	(Liechtenstein) Balzers	Vasil Levski National Stadium, Sofia
17:30	Shishkov 12', 21', 54', 69'; Andonov 47', 50'; Nankov 68' (pen.), 88'	Report		Attendance: 6,200; Referee: Charles Agius (Malta)

29 September 1993 Second leg	Balzers (Liechtenstein)	1–3	(Bulgaria) CSKA Sofia	Sportplatz Rheinau, Balzers
20:00	Kuster 63'	Report	Andonov 32'; Tanev 53'; Ćirić 90'	Attendance: 1,200; Referee: Georgios Michanikos (Cyprus)

CSKA Sofia won 11–1 on aggregate.

== Sources ==
- Switzerland 1993–94 at RSSSF
- Cup finals at Fussball-Schweiz
- Josef Zindel (2018). FC Basel 1893. Die ersten 125 Jahre (in German). Basel: Friedrich Reinhardt Verlag. ISBN 978-3-7245-2305-5.

Preceded by 1992–93	Seasons in Swiss football	Succeeded by 1994–95
