= AaB Fodbold in European football =

AaB in European Football
- Club: AaB
- First entry: 1966–67 European Cup Winners' Cup
- Latest entry: 2014–15 UEFA Europa League

AaB is an association football club from Aalborg, Denmark. The team has participated in four seasons of the UEFA Champions League, eight seasons of the UEFA Cup and Europa League, three seasons of the UEFA Cup Winners' Cup, and four seasons of the UEFA Intertoto Cup.

== Key ==
- S: Seasons
- P: Played
- W: Games won
- D: Games drawn
- L: Games lost
- F: Goals for
- A: Goals against
- aet: Match determined after extra time
- a: Match determined by away goals rule
- p: Match determined by penalties
- 1R: First round
- 2R: Second round
- 3R: Third round
- QR: Qualifying round
- 2Q: Second qualifying round
- 3Q: Third qualifying round
- PO: Play-off round

== Statistics ==
=== Overview ===
As of 26 February 2015

Competition	S	P	W	D	L	GF	GA	GD
UEFA Champions League	4	24	7	6	11	32	41	–9
UEFA Cup Winners' Cup	3	6	1	1	4	3	13	–10
UEFA Europa League	8	32	10	7	15	34	48	–14
UEFA Intertoto Cup	4	16	8	4	4	25	24	+1
Total	–	78	26	18	34	94	126	–32

=== Matches ===
As of 27 November 2025

Season	Competition	Round	Club	Home	Away	Aggregate
1966–67	European Cup Winners' Cup	1R	(England) Everton	0–0	1–2	1–2
1970–71	European Cup Winners' Cup	1R	(Poland) Górnik Zabrze	0–1	1–8	1–9
1987–88	European Cup Winners' Cup	1R	(Socialist Federal Republic of Yugoslavia) Hajduk Split	1–0	0–1(aet)	1–1(2–4 p)
1993–94	UEFA Cup	1R	(Spain) Deportivo	1–0	0–5	1–5
1995–96	UEFA Champions League	QR	(Ukraine) Dynamo Kyiv	1–3	0–1	1–4^{1}
1995–96	UEFA Champions League	Group A	(Greece) Panathinaikos	2–1	0–2	4th
1995–96	UEFA Champions League	Group A	(France) Nantes	0–2	1–3	4th
1995–96	UEFA Champions League	Group A	(Portugal) Porto	2–2	0–2	4th
1996	UEFA Intertoto Cup	Group 1	(Belgium) Standard Liège	—N/a	0–1	2nd
1996	UEFA Intertoto Cup	Group 1	(Germany) VfB Stuttgart	—N/a	1–0	2nd
1996	UEFA Intertoto Cup	Group 1	(Israel) Hapoel Haifa F.C.	5–4	—N/a	2nd
1996	UEFA Intertoto Cup	Group 1	(Northern Ireland) Cliftonville	4–0	—N/a	2nd
1997	UEFA Intertoto Cup	Group 1	(Germany) MSV Duisburg	—N/a	0–2	3rd
1997	UEFA Intertoto Cup	Group 1	(Belarus) Dinamo-93 Minsk	2–1	—N/a	3rd
1997	UEFA Intertoto Cup	Group 1	(Netherlands) Heerenveen	—N/a	2–8	3rd
1997	UEFA Intertoto Cup	Group 1	(Poland) Polonia Warszawa	2–0	—N/a	3rd
1999–2000	UEFA Champions League	3Q	(Ukraine) Dynamo Kyiv	1–2	2–2	3–4
1999–2000	UEFA Cup	1R	(Italy) Udinese	1–2	0–1	1–3
2000	UEFA Intertoto Cup	2R	(Latvia) Dinaburg FC	1–0	0–0	1–0
2000	UEFA Intertoto Cup	3R	(Italy) Udinese	0–2	2–1	2–3
2004–05	UEFA Cup	2Q	(Lithuania) Žalgiris	0–0	3–1	3–1
2004–05	UEFA Cup	1R	(France) Auxerre	1–1	0–2	1–3
2007	UEFA Intertoto Cup	2R	(Finland) FC Honka Espoo	1–1	2–2	3–3 (a)
2007	UEFA Intertoto Cup	3R	(Belgium) K.A.A. Gent	2–1	1–1	3–2
2007–08	UEFA Cup	2Q	(Finland) HJK	3–0	1–2	4–2
2007–08	UEFA Cup	1R	(Italy) Sampdoria	0–0	2–2	2–2 (a)
2007–08	UEFA Cup	Group G	(Spain) Getafe	1–2	—N/a	4th
2007–08	UEFA Cup	Group G	(England) Tottenham Hotspur	—N/a	2–3	4th
2007–08	UEFA Cup	Group G	(Belgium) Anderlecht	1–1	—N/a	4th
2007–08	UEFA Cup	Group G	(Israel) Hapoel Tel Aviv	—N/a	3–1	4th
2008–09	UEFA Champions League	2Q	(Bosnia and Herzegovina) Modriča	5–0	2–1	7–1
2008–09	UEFA Champions League	3Q	(Lithuania) FBK Kaunas	2–0	2–0	4–0
2008–09	UEFA Champions League	Group E	(England) Manchester United	0–3	2–2	3rd
2008–09	UEFA Champions League	Group E	(Spain) Villarreal	2–2	3–6	3rd
2008–09	UEFA Champions League	Group E	(Scotland) Celtic	2–1	0–0	3rd
2008–09	UEFA Cup	Round of 32	(Spain) Deportivo	3–0	3–1	6–1
2008–09	UEFA Cup	Round of 16	(England) Manchester City	2–0 (a.e.t.)	0–2	2–2 (3–4 p)
2009–10	UEFA Europa League	2Q	(Bosnia and Herzegovina) Slavija Sarajevo	0–0	1–3	1–3
2013–14	UEFA Europa League	2Q	(Georgia (country)) FC Dila Gori	0–0	0–3	0–3
2014–15	UEFA Champions League	3Q	(Croatia) Dinamo Zagreb	0–1	2–0	2–1
2014–15	UEFA Champions League	PO	(Cyprus) APOEL	1–1	0–4	1–5
2014–15	UEFA Europa League	Group J	(Ukraine) Dynamo Kyiv	3–0	0–2	2nd
2014–15	UEFA Europa League	Group J	(Romania) Steaua București	1–0	0–6	2nd
2014–15	UEFA Europa League	Group J	(Portugal) Rio Ave	1–0	0–2	2nd
2014–15	UEFA Europa League	Round of 32	(Belgium) Club Brugge	1–3	0–3	1–6

Notes

- Note 1: Dynamo Kyiv won their tie against AaB, but, in their first group game against Panathinaikos, they were accused of a failed attempt to bribe referee Antonio López Nieto to get a win. Despite an appeal, they were thrown out of the competition by UEFA and were banned for the subsequent two years. AaB replaced them in the group stage. Dynamo's ban was eventually reduced to just one (current) season.

=== Record by country of opposition ===
As of 26 February 2015

Country	P	W	D	L	GF	GA	GD
Belarus	1	1	0	0	2	1	1
Belgium	6	1	2	3	5	10	–5
Bosnia and Herzegovina	4	2	1	1	8	4	4
Croatia	2	1	0	1	2	1	1
Cyprus	2	0	1	1	1	5	–4
England	7	1	2	4	7	12	–5
Finland	4	1	2	1	7	5	2
France	4	0	1	3	2	8	–6
(Georgia (country)) Georgia	2	0	1	1	0	3	–3
Germany	2	1	0	1	1	2	–1
Greece	2	1	0	1	2	3	–1
Israel	2	2	0	0	8	5	3
Italy	6	1	2	3	5	8	–3
Latvia	2	1	1	0	1	0	1
Lithuania	4	3	1	0	7	1	6
Netherlands	1	0	0	1	2	8	–6
Northern Ireland	1	1	0	0	4	0	4
Poland	3	1	0	2	3	9	–6
Portugal	4	1	1	2	3	6	–3
Romania	2	1	0	1	1	6	–5
Scotland	2	1	1	0	2	1	1
Spain	7	3	1	3	13	16	–3
Ukraine	6	1	1	4	7	10	–3
(Socialist Federal Republic of Yugoslavia) Yugoslavia	2	1	0	1	1	1	0

== Additional official appearances ==
Before the Intertoto Cup was taken over by UEFA in 1995, a number of tournaments were held with AaB taking part in five of them. These matches are considered official. In addition to those matches, AaB also qualified for one season of the Royal League, an official club competition for Scandinavian teams.

=== Matches ===
As of 16 February 2006

Season	Competition	Round	Club	Home	Away	Aggregate
1970	Intertoto Cup	Group B7	(Czechoslovakia) Baník	1–2	0–3	4th
1970	Intertoto Cup	Group B7	(Poland) Gwardia Warszawa	1–1	1–7	4th
1970	Intertoto Cup	Group B7	(Austria) Swarovski Wattens	2–3	2–5	4th
1977	Intertoto Cup	Group 9	(Sweden) Öster	1–3	2–2	4th
1977	Intertoto Cup	Group 9	(Czechoslovakia) FC Zbrojovka Brno	0–4	1–2	4th
1977	Intertoto Cup	Group 9	Austria Salzburg	1–1	1–1	4th
1992	Intertoto Cup	Group 8	(Sweden) Hammarby IF	3–0	0–0	1st
1992	Intertoto Cup	Group 8	(Netherlands) Dordrecht'90	3–0	1–1	1st
1992	Intertoto Cup	Group 8	(Germany) 1. FC Saarbrücken	2–1	2–0	1st
1993	Intertoto Cup	Group 5	(Czech Republic) Slavia Prague	—N/a	0–3	3rd
1993	Intertoto Cup	Group 5	(Germany) 1. FC Lokomotive Leipzig	—N/a	1–2	3rd
1993	Intertoto Cup	Group 5	(Sweden) BK Häcken	3–1	—N/a	3rd
1993	Intertoto Cup	Group 5	(Israel) Maccabi Tel Aviv	2–1	—N/a	3rd
1994	Intertoto Cup	Group 7	(Switzerland) Grasshoppers	—N/a	1–3	3rd
1994	Intertoto Cup	Group 7	(Sweden) Trelleborg	0–4	—N/a	3rd
1994	Intertoto Cup	Group 7	(Germany) MSV Duisburg	—N/a	2–1	3rd
1994	Intertoto Cup	Group 7	(Slovakia) DAC Dunajská Streda	3–1	—N/a	3rd
2005–06	Royal League	Group 3	(Sweden) Djurgårdens IF	1–3	1–2	4th
2005–06	Royal League	Group 3	(Norway) Lyn	2–1	0–0	4th
2005–06	Royal League	Group 3	(Sweden) IFK Göteborg	0–0	3–3	4th
