= Oliver Neuville =

German footballer (born 1973)

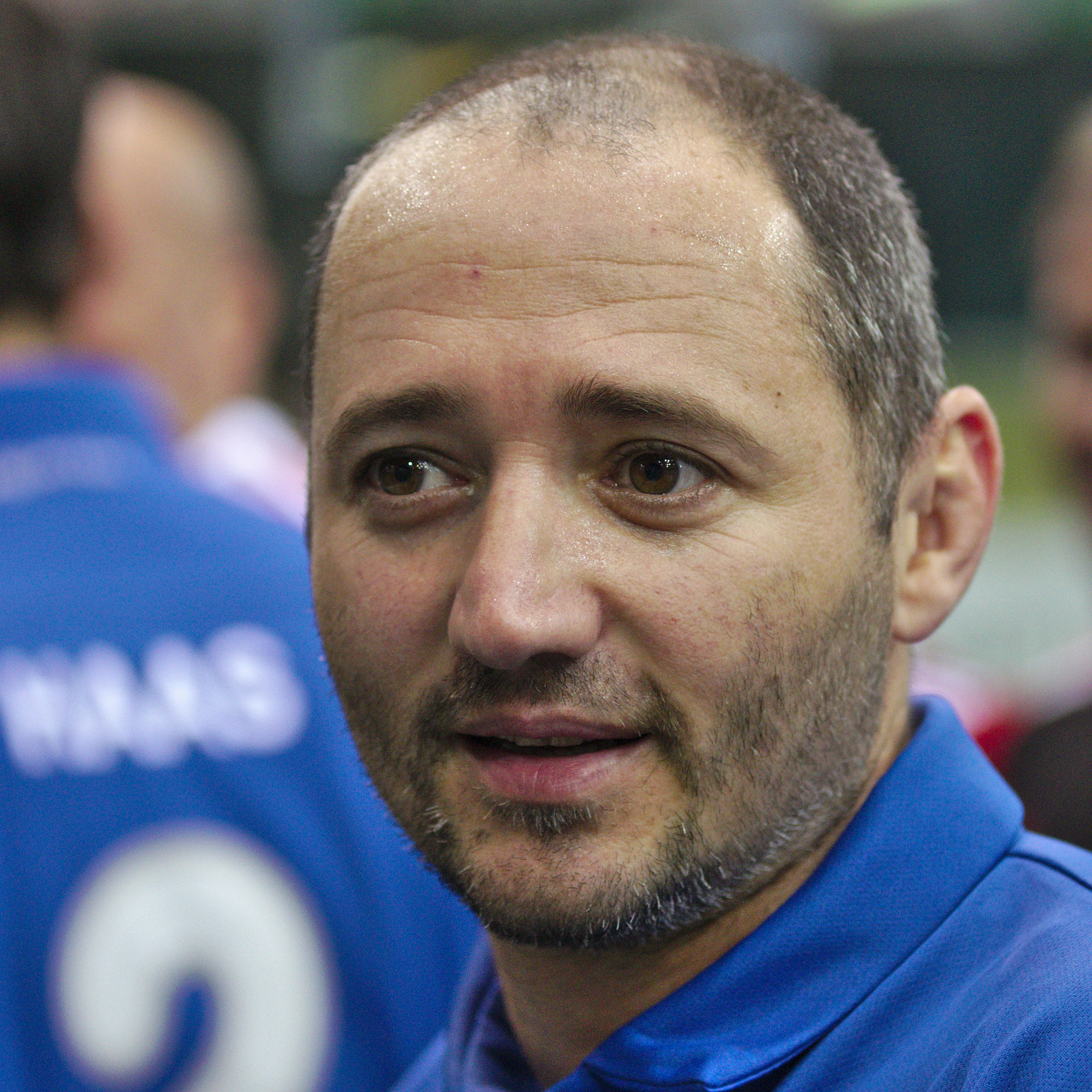
- Neuville in 2014

Personal information
- Full name: Oliver Patric Neuville
- Date of birth: 1 May 1973 (age 53)
- Place of birth: Locarno, Switzerland
- Height: 1.71 m (5 ft 7 in)
- Position: Striker

Youth career
- 1979–1990: US Gambarogno

Senior career*
Years	Team	Apps	(Gls)
1991–1992	FC Locarno	14	(8)
1992–1996	Servette	114	(43)
1996–1997	Tenerife	33	(5)
1997–1999	Hansa Rostock	50	(22)
1999–2004	Bayer Leverkusen	165	(42)
2004–2010	Borussia Mönchengladbach	153	(42)
2008–2009	Borussia Mönchengladbach II	2	(0)
2010	Arminia Bielefeld	12	(2)
Total		543	(164)

International career
1998–2008	Germany	69	(10)
Medal record
Men's football
Representing Germany
FIFA World Cup
Runner-up	2002 Korea/Japan
Third place	2006 Germany
UEFA European Championship
Runner-up	2008 Austria–Switzerland
- * Club domestic league appearances and goals

Oliver Patric Neuville (German pronunciation: [ˈɔlivɐ ˈnøːvɪl]; born 1 May 1973) is a former footballer who played as a striker. Born in Switzerland, he represented the Germany national team.

During an 18-year professional career which began in Switzerland, he played mainly for German clubs Bayer Leverkusen (five seasons) and Borussia Mönchengladbach (six), amassing Bundesliga totals of 334 games and 91 goals.

Neuville appeared nearly 70 times for Germany during one full decade, representing them at two World Cups and at Euro 2008.

== Club career ==
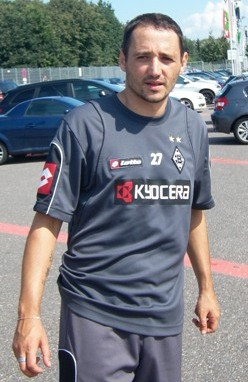
Neuville with Borussia Mönchengladbach in 2008

Born in Locarno, Switzerland, to a German father from Aachen and Swiss mother of Italian descent, Neuville started his professional career with Servette FC. In only his second season in the Swiss Super League, he scored a career-best 16 goals to help the club win the national championship after a nine-year wait.

In 1996–97, Neuville played in Spain with CD Tenerife, where he was part of a well-balanced attacking line that also featured Juanele (eight goals), Meho Kodro (six), Antonio Pinilla (seven) and Aurelio Vidmar (one), netting five goals in 1,885 minutes as the Canary Islands team easily retained their La Liga status, and also playing a relatively important part in their semi-final run in the UEFA Cup. Subsequently, he moved to Germany and signed for F.C. Hansa Rostock, scoring eight times in only 17 contests in his debut campaign in the Bundesliga, as the side from the former East Germany finished sixth.

Neuville signed for Bayer 04 Leverkusen in the 1999 summer, quickly becoming an essential offensive figure for his new club. He scored 28 goals combined from 2000 to 2002 (including a hat-trick against Hamburger SV on 24 November 2001), while also adding five in 15 UEFA Champions League appearances in 2001–02, as Bayer finished second to Real Madrid (he scored one apiece in both legs of the semifinal clash against Manchester United); the club also finished second in the league during this timeframe.

After Klaus Augenthaler's became Leverkusen coach, Neuville's playing time was limited and he was not offered a contract extension. In summer 2004, aged 31, Neuville joined Borussia Mönchengladbach on a free transfer. On 17 October 2004 he scored an infamous goal with his hand against 1. FC Kaiserslautern in a 2–0 home win, which was widely reviled and landed him a two-match ban. He netted 22 goals in his first two seasons combined, but appeared scarcely as the Foals dropped down a level in 2007, mainly due to injury.

Neuville returned to form in 2007–08, scoring 15 goals to help Borussia return to the top flight the immediate campaign after, the competition's sixth-best. He made his last Bundesliga appearance on the final matchday of the 2009–10 season, against former team Bayer Leverkusen.

It was planned that Neuville would start to work as a youth coach for Borussia Mönchengladbach. Instead, he decided to play one more year and signed for Arminia Bielefeld in the 2. Bundesliga. However, after only a couple of months, he left by mutual consent, retiring at the age of 37.

== International career ==
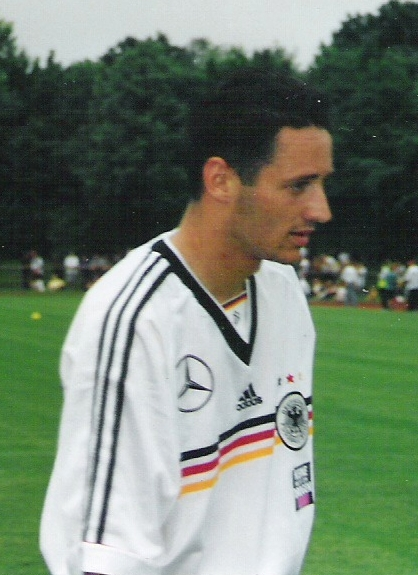
Neuville with Germany

After electing to represent Germany at international level, Neuville made his international debut on 2 September 1998 against Malta, in a friendly, replacing Mario Basler for the last fifteen minutes of the 2–1 away win. In his first months training with the national team he needed an interpreter to understand coach Erich Ribbeck's message, while getting his across as well.

Subsequently, Neuville went on to collect 69 caps with ten goals. He was picked for the squad that finished second at the 2002 FIFA World Cup. Neuville made his first start of the tournament in the round-of-16 win against Paraguay, and scored his first World Cup goal late on, the only goal of the game. In the final against Brazil, Neuville hit the post with a free kick from 30 yards out with the scores at 0-0, before Germany eventually lost the match 2-0.

After missing selection for UEFA Euro 2004, in the second group stage match of the 2006 World Cup against Poland, Neuville, who had replaced Lukas Podolski, buried a desperate injury-time cross from fellow substitute David Odonkor, beating goalkeeper Artur Boruc on the way to a 1–0 victory. He did not score again for the national team until 31 May 2008, when he slid in a Marcell Jansen cross in a Euro 2008 warm-up against Serbia, appearing in the tournament's final stages in the Group B match against Austria as a late substitute, and retiring from international play at the age of 35.

== Personal life ==
Along with Bernd Schneider, Neuville was one of the two known smokers in the Germany national team. His name (properly pronounced in French – not German – fashion) stemmed from his Belgian grandfather.

In 1997, Neuville fathered a son named Lars-Oliver.

== Career statistics ==
=== Club ===
Appearances and goals by club, season and competition
Club	Season	League			National cup		Europe		Total	
Club	Season	Division	Apps	Goals	Apps	Goals	Apps	Goals	Apps	Goals
FC Locarno	1991–92	Swiss Challenge League	14	8			–		14	8
Servette	1992–93	Nationalliga A	28	4			–		28	4
Servette	1993–94	Nationalliga A	31	16			3	0	34	16
Servette	1994–95	Nationalliga A	21	8			2	0	23	8
Servette	1995–96	Nationalliga A	34	15			–		34	15
Servette	Total		114	43			5	0	119	43
Tenerife	1996–97	La Liga	33	5	2	0	8	0	43	5
Hansa Rostock	1997–98	Bundesliga	17	8	0	0	–		17	8
Hansa Rostock	1998–99	Bundesliga	33	14	2	0	2	0	37	14
Hansa Rostock	Total		50	22	2	0	2	0	54	22
Bayer Leverkusen	1999–2000	Bundesliga	33	4	1	0	7	2	41	6
Bayer Leverkusen	2000–01	Bundesliga	34	15	2	0	8	1	44	16
Bayer Leverkusen	2001–02	Bundesliga	33	13	5	1	17	7	55	21
Bayer Leverkusen	2002–03	Bundesliga	33	4	5	0	10	0	48	4
Bayer Leverkusen	2003–04	Bundesliga	32	6	3	2	0	0	35	8
Bayer Leverkusen	Total		165	42	16	3	42	10	223	55
Borussia Mönchengladbach	2004–05	Bundesliga	32	12	1	0	0	0	33	12
Borussia Mönchengladbach	2005–06	Bundesliga	34	10	1	0	0	0	35	10
Borussia Mönchengladbach	2006–07	Bundesliga	16	4	1	0	–		17	4
Borussia Mönchengladbach	2007–08	2. Bundesliga	34	15	2	0	–		36	15
Borussia Mönchengladbach	2008–09	Bundesliga	25	1	1	0	0	0	26	1
Borussia Mönchengladbach	2009–10	Bundesliga	12	0	2	0	0	0	14	0
Borussia Mönchengladbach	Total		153	42	8	0	0	0	161	42
Borussia Mönchengladbach II	2008–09	Regionalliga West	1	0	–		–		1	0
Borussia Mönchengladbach II	2009–10	Regionalliga West	1	0	–		–		1	0
Borussia Mönchengladbach II	Total		2	0	0	0	0	0	2	0
Arminia Bielefeld	2010–11	2. Bundesliga	12	2	1	0	–		13	2
Career total			543	164	29	3	57	10	629	177

=== International ===
Appearances and goals by national team and year
National team	Year	Apps	Goals
Germany	1998	3	0
Germany	1999	12	1
Germany	2000	4	0
Germany	2001	10	1
Germany	2002	10	2
Germany	2003	7	0
Germany	2004	2	0
Germany	2005	3	1
Germany	2006	14	4
Germany	2007	1	0
Germany	2008	3	1
Total		69	10

Scores and results list Germany's goal tally first, score column indicates score after each Neuville goal.

List of international goals scored by Oliver Neuville
No.	Date	Venue	Opponent	Score	Result	Competition
1	31 March 1999	Frankenstadion, Nuremberg, Germany	Finland	2–0	2–0	UEFA Euro 2000 qualifying
2	14 November 2001	Westfalenstadion, Dortmund, Germany	Ukraine	2–0	4–1	2002 FIFA World Cup qualification
3	27 March 2002	Ostseestadion, Rostock, Germany	United States	2–1	4–2	Friendly
4	15 June 2002	Jeju World Cup Stadium, Seogwipo, South Korea	Paraguay	1–0	1–0	2002 FIFA World Cup
5	8 October 2005	Atatürk Olympic Stadium, Istanbul, Turkey	Turkey	1–2	1–2	Friendly
6	22 March 2006	Westfalenstadion, Dortmund, Germany	United States	2–0	4–1	Friendly
7	27 May 2006	Dreisamstadion, Freiburg, Germany	Luxembourg	6–0	7–0	Friendly
8	27 May 2006	Dreisamstadion, Freiburg, Germany	Luxembourg	7–0	7–0	Friendly
9	14 June 2006	Westfalenstadion, Dortmund, Germany	Poland	1–0	1–0	2006 FIFA World Cup
10	31 May 2008	Veltins-Arena, Gelsenkirchen, Germany	Serbia	1–1	2–1	Friendly

== Honours ==
Servette

- Swiss League: 1993–94

Bayer Leverkusen

- UEFA Champions League runner-up: 2001–02
- DFB-Pokal runner-up: 2001–02

Borussia Mönchengladbach

- 2. Bundesliga: 2007–08

Germany

- FIFA World Cup runner-up: 2002; third place: 2006
- UEFA European Championship runner-up: 2008
- FIFA Confederations Cup third place: 2005

=== Individual ===
- Goal of the Year in Germany: 2006
- Goal of the Month in Germany: July 2006
- Silver Laurel Leaf: 2006
