= 1999–2000 in German football =

Football in Germany
- Season: 1999–2000

Men's football
- Bundesliga: Bayern Munich
- 2. Bundesliga: 1. FC Köln
- DFB-Pokal: Bayern Munich
- DFB-Ligapokal: Bayern Munich

Women's football
- Frauen-Bundesliga: FCR 2001 Duisburg
- DFB-Pokal: 1. FFC Frankfurt

The 1999–2000 season was the 90th season of competitive football in Germany.

== National teams ==
=== Germany national football team ===
==== UEFA Euro 2000 qualification ====
Win Draw Loss

Date Kick–off time	Venue	Location	Opponent	Score F–A	Att.	Goalscorers and disciplined players		Ref.
Date Kick–off time	Venue	Location	Opponent	Score F–A	Att.	Germany	Opponent	Ref.
4 September 1999; 19:00 CEST	Olympic Stadium	Helsinki, Finland	Finland	2–1	20,184	Bierhoff 2', 17'	Ylönen (yellow card) 44'; Salli 63'; Tainio (yellow card) 74'	
8 September 1999; 20:30 CEST	Westfalenstadion	Dortmund, Germany	Northern Ireland	4–0	41,000	Bierhoff 2'; Ziege 16', 33', 45' (yellow card) 42'; Linke (yellow card) 69'; Strunz (yellow card) 77'	Horlock (yellow card) 34'; Quinn (yellow card) 57'; Lomas (yellow card) 58'	
9 October 1999; 19:30 CEST	Olympiastadion	Munich, Germany	Turkey	0–0	63,572	Scholl (yellow card) 32'; Nerlinger (yellow card) 77'	Ercan (yellow card) 55'; Buruk (yellow card) 70'; Yalçın (yellow card) 82'	

==== UEFA Euro 2000 ====
Win Draw Loss

Round	Date Kick–off time	Venue	Location	Opponent	Score F–A	Att.	Goalscorers and disciplined players		Ref.
Round	Date Kick–off time	Venue	Location	Opponent	Score F–A	Att.	Germany	Opponent	Ref.
Group A	12 June 2000; 18:00 CEST	Stade Maurice Dufrasne	Liège, Belgium	Romania	1–1	30,000	Scholl 28'	Moldovan 5'; Ilie (yellow card) 49'; Hagi (yellow card) 49'	
Group A	17 June 2000; 20:45 CEST	Stade du Pays de Charleroi	Charleroi, Belgium	England	0–1	27,700	Jeremies (yellow card) 43'	Beckham (yellow card) 41'; Shearer 53'	
Group A	20 June 2000; 20:45 CEST	Stadion Feijenoord	Rotterdam, Netherlands	Portugal	0–3	44,000	Ballack (yellow card) 25'; Jancker (yellow card) 26'; Deisler (yellow card) 27'; Rink (yellow card) 90'	Beto (yellow card) 27'; Conceição 35', 54', 71'	

==== 1999 FIFA Confederations Cup ====
Win Draw Loss

Round	Date Kick–off time	Venue	Location	Opponent	Score F–A	Att.	Goalscorers and disciplined players		Ref.
Round	Date Kick–off time	Venue	Location	Opponent	Score F–A	Att.	Germany	Opponent	Ref.
Group B	24 July 1999; 12:00 CDT	Estadio Jalisco	Guadalajara, Mexico	Brazil	0–4	60,000	Scholl (yellow card) 9'	Emerson (yellow card) 12'; Vampeta (yellow card) 17'; Zé Roberto 62'; Ronaldinho 72' (pen.); Alex 86', 87'	
Group B	28 July 1999; 18:00 CDT	Estadio Jalisco	Guadalajara, Mexico	New Zealand	2–0	42,000	Preetz 6'; Marschall (yellow card) 19'; Matthäus 33' (yellow card) 47'	—	
Group B	30 July 1999; 18:00 CDT	Estadio Jalisco	Guadalajara, Mexico	United States	0–2	53,000	Gerber (yellow card) 60'; Wörns (yellow card) 75'; Matthäus (yellow card) 81'; Rink (yellow card) 90+2'	Olsen 23' (yellow card) 33'; Hejduk (yellow card) 39'; Agoos (yellow card) 47'; Moore 50'	

==== Friendly matches ====
Win Draw Loss

Date Kick–off time	Venue	Location	Opponent	Score F–A	Att.	Goalscorers and disciplined players		Ref.
Date Kick–off time	Venue	Location	Opponent	Score F–A	Att.	Germany	Opponent	Ref.
14 November 1999; 17:30 CET	Ullevaal Stadion	Oslo, Norway	Norway	1–0	14,359	Scholl 90'	—	
23 February 2000; 20:15 CET	Amsterdam Arena	Amsterdam, Netherlands	Netherlands	1–2	50,000	Ziege 22'; Baumann (yellow card) 85'	Kluivert 15'; Zenden 28'; Davids (yellow card) 88'	
29 March 2000; 19:00 CEST	Stadion Maksimir	Zagreb, Croatia	Croatia	1–1	5,000	Rehmer 12'; Bierhoff (yellow card) 57'; Ramelow (yellow card) 58'	Šuker (yellow card) 39'; N. Kovač 70' (yellow card) 73'; R. Kovač (yellow card) 78'	
26 April 2000; 20:30 CEST	Fritz Walter Stadion	Kaiserslautern, Germany	Switzerland	1–1	32,000	Kirsten 85'	Yakin 35'; Sesa (yellow card) 74'	
3 June 2000; 20:30 CEST	Frankenstadion	Nuremberg, Germany	Czech Republic	3–2	30,000	Jancker 38'; Bierhoff 62' (pen.), 90'	Kuka 54'; Berger 80'	
7 June 2000; 19:30 CEST	Dreisamstadion	Freiburg, Germany	Liechtenstein	8–2	24,000	Bierhoff 1'; Scholl 31'; Bode 65'; Hasler 80' (o.g.); Kirsten 81', 86'; Jancker 84', 88'	Stocklasa 17'; Frick 56'	

=== Germany women's national football team ===
==== UEFA Women's Euro 2001 qualification ====
Win Draw Loss

Date Kick–off time	Venue	Location	Opponent	Score F–A	Att.	Goalscorers		Ref.
Date Kick–off time	Venue	Location	Opponent	Score F–A	Att.	Germany	Opponent	Ref.
23 September 1999; 14:00 CEST	Playmobilstadion	Fürth, Germany	Ukraine	3–0	1,900	Grings 30', 85'; Fitschen 90'	—	
14 October 1999; 14:00 CEST	Marschweg-Stadion	Oldenburg, Germany	Iceland	5–0	2,050	Grings 6'; Wiegmann 25', 64'; Voss 39'; Müller 86'	—	
11 November 1999; 14:30 CET	Nuovo Stadio Contrada Le Piane	Isernia, Italy	Italy	4–4	1,300	Fitschen 7'; Grings 12', 30'; Wiegmann 72'	Panico 29', 37', 68'; Zorri 76'	
6 April 2000; 15:05 CEST	Stadion am Bornheimer Hang	Frankfurt, Germany	Italy	3–0	5,800	Prinz 18'; Grings 43'; Smisek 82'	—	
11 May 2000	Olimpiyskiy National Sports Complex	Kyiv, Ukraine	Ukraine	6–1	400	Prinz 16', 17', 38', 58'; Grings 40'; Müller 73'	Verezubova 24'	

==== Friendly matches ====
Win Draw Loss

Date Kick–off time	Location	Opponent	Score F–A	Att.	Goalscorers		Ref.
Date Kick–off time	Location	Opponent	Score F–A	Att.	Germany	Opponent	Ref.
2 September 1999; 19:00 CEST	Plauen, Germany	Russia	3–1	1,900	Wiegmann 7' (pen.); Smisek 46'; Grings 80'	Barbashina 31'	
16 March 2000	Arnhem, Netherlands	Netherlands	0–2	500	—	Noom 42'; Migchelsen 80'	

== League season ==
=== Men ===
==== Bundesliga ====
Pos	Team	Pld	W	D	L	GF	GA	GD	Pts	Qualification or relegation
1	Bayern Munich (C)	34	22	7	5	73	28	+45	73	Qualification to Champions League group stage
2	Bayer Leverkusen	34	21	10	3	74	36	+38	73	Qualification to Champions League group stage
3	Hamburger SV	34	16	11	7	63	39	+24	59	Qualification to Champions League third qualifying round
4	1860 Munich	34	14	11	9	55	48	+7	53	Qualification to Champions League third qualifying round
5	1. FC Kaiserslautern	34	15	5	14	54	59	−5	50	Qualification to UEFA Cup first round
6	Hertha BSC	34	13	11	10	39	46	−7	50	Qualification to UEFA Cup first round
7	VfL Wolfsburg	34	12	13	9	51	58	−7	49	Qualification to Intertoto Cup third round
8	VfB Stuttgart	34	14	6	14	44	47	−3	48	Qualification to Intertoto Cup second round
9	Werder Bremen	34	13	8	13	65	52	+13	47	Qualification to UEFA Cup first round (Note: As domestic cup winners FC Bayern Munich had qualified for UEFA Champions League, the UEFA Cup place belonging to the domestic cup winners was transferred to Werder Bremen.)
10	SpVgg Unterhaching	34	12	8	14	40	42	−2	44	
11	Borussia Dortmund	34	9	13	12	41	38	+3	40	
12	SC Freiburg	34	10	10	14	45	50	−5	40	
13	Schalke 04	34	8	15	11	42	44	−2	39 (Note: Head-to-head was used as a tie-breaker between Schalke 04 and Frankfurt.)	
14	Eintracht Frankfurt (Note: Eintracht Frankfurt were docked two points because of licensing irregularities.)	34	12	5	17	42	44	−2	39	
15	Hansa Rostock	34	8	14	12	44	60	−16	38	
16	SSV Ulm 1846 (R)	34	9	8	17	36	62	−26	35	Relegation to 2. Bundesliga
17	Arminia Bielefeld (R)	34	7	9	18	40	61	−21	30	Relegation to 2. Bundesliga
18	MSV Duisburg (R)	34	4	10	20	37	71	−34	22	Relegation to 2. Bundesliga

Source: www.dfb.de
Rules for classification: 1) points; 2) goal difference; 3) number of goals scored.
(C) Champions; (R) Relegated

==== 2. Bundesliga ====
Pos	Team	Pld	W	D	L	GF	GA	GD	Pts	Promotion or relegation
1	1. FC Köln (C, P)	34	19	8	7	68	39	+29	65	Promotion to Bundesliga
2	VfL Bochum (P)	34	18	7	9	67	48	+19	61	Promotion to Bundesliga
3	Energie Cottbus (P)	34	18	4	12	62	42	+20	58	Promotion to Bundesliga
4	1. FC Nürnberg	34	15	10	9	54	46	+8	55	
5	Borussia Mönchengladbach	34	14	12	8	60	43	+17	54	
6	Rot-Weiß Oberhausen	34	12	13	9	43	34	+9	49	
7	SpVgg Greuther Fürth	34	10	16	8	40	39	+1	46	
8	Alemannia Aachen	34	12	10	12	46	54	−8	46	
9	Mainz 05	34	11	12	11	41	42	−1	45	
10	Hannover 96	34	12	8	14	56	56	0	44	
11	Chemnitzer FC	34	11	10	13	42	49	−7	43	
12	Waldhof Mannheim	34	10	12	12	50	59	−9	42	
13	FC St. Pauli	34	8	15	11	37	45	−8	39	
14	Stuttgarter Kickers	34	10	9	15	49	58	−9	39	
15	Fortuna Köln (R)	34	8	11	15	38	50	−12	35	Relegation to Regionalliga (Note: Fortuna Köln and Tennis Borussia Berlin were relegated to the Regionalliga Nord. Karlsruher SC and Kickers Offenbach were relegated to the Regionalliga Süd.)
16	Kickers Offenbach (R)	34	8	11	15	35	58	−23	35	Relegation to Regionalliga
17	Karlsruher SC (R)	34	5	12	17	35	56	−21	27	Relegation to Regionalliga
18	Tennis Borussia Berlin (Note: Tennis Borussia Berlin had their license revoked. Under paragraph 41 of the DFB regulations, Tennis Borussia Berlin were placed last.) (R)	34	10	10	14	42	50	−8	40	Relegation to Regionalliga

Source: Bundesliga.de
Rules for classification: 1) points; 2) goal difference; 3) number of goals scored.
(C) Champions; (P) Promoted; (R) Relegated

=== Women ===
==== Bundesliga ====
Pos	Team	Pld	W	D	L	GF	GA	GD	Pts	Relegation
1	FCR Duisburg	22	20	0	2	85	10	+75	60	1999–2000 Frauen-Bundesliga champions
2	1. FFC Frankfurt (Note: 1998–99 Frauen-Bundesliga champion)	22	14	3	5	67	13	+54	45	
3	Sportfreunde Siegen	22	13	3	6	48	28	+20	42	
4	1. FFC Turbine Potsdam	22	13	2	7	43	27	+16	41	
5	Grün-Weiß Brauweiler	22	11	6	5	50	30	+20	39	
6	SC 07 Bad Neuenahr	22	12	2	8	41	28	+13	38	
7	WSV Wendschott	22	10	5	7	46	37	+9	35	
8	FFC Flaesheim-Hillen (Note: Promoted from the 2. Bundesliga (women) last season)	22	6	2	14	23	74	−51	20	
9	FSV Frankfurt	22	6	1	15	28	52	−24	19	
10	1. FC Saarbrücken	22	5	3	14	25	40	−15	18	
11	TuS Niederkirchen	22	4	2	16	16	63	−47	14	Will be relegated to the 2. Bundesliga (women)
12	1. FC Nürnberg	22	2	3	17	15	85	−70	9	Will be relegated to the 2. Bundesliga (women)
