= Borislav Tomoski =

Macedonian footballer

Personal information
- Date of birth: 21 September 1972 (age 54)
- Place of birth: Skopje, SR Macedonia, SFR Yugoslavia
- Height: 1.75 m (5 ft 9 in)
- Position: Midfielder

Youth career
- Vojvodina

Senior career*
Years	Team	Apps	(Gls)
1990–1991	Vojvodina	7	(0)
1991–1995	Teteks		
1995–1997	Erzgebirge Aue	65	(3)
1997–1998	Hansa Rostock	1	(0)
1998–2002	Erzgebirge Aue	119	(8)
2002–2003	Rot-Weiss Essen	26	(1)
2003–2005	SC Paderborn	54	(0)
2005–2007	Chemnitzer FC	36	(0)
2007–2009	VfB Auerbach		

International career
1994	Macedonia	2	(0)
- * Club domestic league appearances and goals

Borislav Tomoski (Macedonian Cyrillic: Борислав Томоски; born 21 September 1972) is a Macedonian former professional footballer who played as a midfielder.

== Club career ==
Tomovski started playing with FK Vojvodina in the 1990–91 Yugoslav First League. In 1995, he moved to Germany to Erzgebirge Aue where he played until 2002, with the exception of the 1997–98 season during which he played at Bundesliga club Hansa Rostock. After 2002, he stayed in Germany playing for Rot-Weiss Essen, SC Paderborn, Chemnitzer FC, and VfB Auerbach.

== International career ==
Tomoski made his senior debut for Macedonia in a March 1994 friendly match against Slovenia and has earned a total of two caps, scoring no goals. His second and final international was an August 1994 friendly against Turkey.
