= 1994–95 Swiss 1. Liga =

1. Liga
- Season: 1994–95
- Champions: Overall champions Chiasso; Group 1: Naters; Group 2: Münsingen; Group 3: SC Brühl; Group 4: Chiasso
- Promoted: Chiasso; Naters
- Relegated: Group 1: Signal FC (Bernex); Le Mont; Urania Genève Sport; Group 2: FC Moutier; ASI Audax-Friul; Group 3: FC Pratteln; FC Wiedikon; Group 4: TSV St. Otmar St. Gallen; FC Uznach; Chur
- Matches: 4 times 182 and 3 deciders plus 12 play-offs and 4 play-outs

The 1994–95 Swiss 1. Liga was the 63rd season of this league since its creation in 1931. At this time, the 1. Liga was the third tier of the Swiss football league system and it was the highest level of amateur football. This was the final season in which two points were awarded for a win; from the next season onwards this was to changed to three points.

== Format ==
There were 56 clubs in the 1. Liga, divided into four regional groups of 14 teams. Within each group, the teams would play a double round-robin to decide their league position. The four group winners and the four runners-up then contested a play-off for the two promotion slots. The two last placed teams in each group were directly relegated to the 2. Liga (fourth tier). The four third-last placed teams would compete a play-out against the ninth and tenth relegation places.

== Group 1 ==
=== Teams ===
Club	Canton	Stadium	Capacity
FC Bulle	Fribourg	Stade de Bouleyres	7,000
Grand-Lancy FC	Geneva	Stade de Marignac	1,500
FC Le Mont	Vaud	Centre Sportif du Châtaignier	2,500
FC Martigny-Sports	Valais	Stade d'Octodure	2,500
FC Monthey	Valais	Stade Philippe Pottier	1,800
FC Montreux-Sports	Vaud	Stade de Chailly	1,000
FC Naters	Valais	Sportanlage Stapfen	3,000
FC Raron	Valais	Sportplatz Rhoneglut	1,000
FC Renens	Waadt	Zone sportive du Censuy	2,300
Signal FC Bernex-Confignon	Geneva	Stade municipal de Bernex	1,000
FC Stade Lausanne	Vaud	Centre sportif de Vidy	1,000
FC Stade Nyonnais	Vaud	Stade de Colovray	7,200
Urania Genève Sport	Geneva	Stade de Frontenex	4,000
Vevey Sports	Vaud	Stade de Copet	4,000

=== Final league table ===
Pos	Team	Pld	W	D	L	GF	GA	GD	Pts	Qualification or relegation
1	FC Naters	26	17	6	3	50	22	+28	40	Play-off to Nationalliga B
2	FC Bulle	26	17	5	4	64	25	+39	39	Decider winners, to play-off to Nationalliga B
3	FC Raron	26	16	7	3	56	25	+31	39	To decider
4	FC Renens	26	14	7	5	61	32	+29	35	
5	Vevey Sports	26	15	2	9	45	26	+19	32	
6	FC Martigny-Sports	26	10	7	9	40	47	−7	27	
7	FC Montreux-Sports	26	10	6	10	34	33	+1	26	
8	FC Stade Nyonnais	26	9	6	11	42	44	−2	24	
9	FC Stade Lausanne	26	9	4	13	37	53	−16	22	
10	FC Monthey	26	8	5	13	40	48	−8	21	
11	Grand-Lancy FC	26	8	4	14	32	37	−5	20	
12	Signal FC (Bernex)	26	6	5	15	29	42	−13	17	Decider winners, to play-out against relegation
13	FC Le Mont	26	6	5	15	38	76	−38	17	Decider losers, relegation to 2. Liga
14	Urania Genève Sport	26	1	3	22	24	82	−58	5	Relegation to 2. Liga

Source: RSSSF
Rules for classification: 1) Points; 2) Goal difference within the league, but play-off for qualifiers.

=== Deciders ===
The decider for second position, qualification to play-off, was played at a neutral ground. It took place on 23 May 1995 at the Stade d'Octodure in Martigny.

Team 1	Score	Team 2
Bulle	2–1	Raron

Bulle win and advance to play-offs. Raron remain in division

Decider for 12th/13th position, play-out or direct relegation, was played at a neutral ground. It took place on 23 May 1995 at the Stade de Colovray in Nyon.

Team 1	Score	Team 2
Signal FC (Bernex)	2–0	Le Mont

Signal FC (Bernex) win and advance to play-outs. Le Mont are directly relegated to 2. Liga.

== Group 2 ==
=== Teams ===
Club	Canton	Stadium	Capacity
ASI Audax-Friul	Neuchâtel	Pierre-à-Bot	1,700
FC Biel-Bienne	Bern	Stadion Gurzelen	15,000
SC Bümpliz 78	Bern	Bodenweid	4,000
FC Colombier	Neuchâtel	Stade des Chézards	2,500
FC Fribourg	Fribourg	Stade Universitaire	9,000
FC La Chaux-de-Fonds	Neuchâtel	Centre Sportif de la Charrière	12,700
FC Le Locle	Neuchâtel	Installation sportive - Jeanneret	3,142
SV Lyss	Bern	Sportzentrum Grien	2,000
FC Moutier	Bern	Stade de Chalière	5,000
FC Münsingen	Bern	Sportanlage Sandreutenen	1,400
BSC Old Boys	Basel-City	Stadion Schützenmatte	8,000
FC Riehen	Basel-City	Sportplatz Grendelmatte	2,500
FC Serrières	Neuchâtel	Pierre-à-Bot	1,700
FC Thun	Bern	Stadion Lachen	10,350

=== Final league table ===
Pos	Team	Pld	W	D	L	GF	GA	GD	Pts	Qualification or relegation
1	FC Münsingen	26	15	10	1	40	11	+29	40	Play-off to Nationalliga B
2	FC Thun	26	15	7	4	57	21	+36	37	Play-off to Nationalliga B
3	FC Fribourg	26	10	9	7	39	24	+15	29	
4	BSC Old Boys	26	12	5	9	35	34	+1	29	
5	FC Serrières	26	8	12	6	39	33	+6	28	
6	FC Biel-Bienne	26	10	7	9	46	37	+9	27	
7	FC Riehen	26	8	8	10	35	34	+1	24	
8	FC Le Locle	26	10	4	12	38	40	−2	24	
9	FC La Chaux-de-Fonds	26	7	10	9	29	44	−15	24	
10	FC Colombier	26	8	7	11	33	37	−4	23	
11	SV Lyss	26	8	7	11	35	41	−6	23	To decider
12	SC Bümpliz 78	26	9	5	12	29	44	−15	23	To decider
13	FC Moutier	26	9	4	13	28	38	−10	22	Relegation to 2. Liga
14	ASI Audax-Friul	26	2	7	17	15	60	−45	11	Relegation to 2. Liga

Source: RSSSF
Rules for classification: 1) Points; 2) Goal difference within the league, but play-off for qualifiers.

=== Decider ===
Decider for 11th/12th position. 12th position means advance to play-out against relegation. The decider was played at a neutral ground. It took place on 23 May 1995 at Stadion Gurzelen in Biel/Bienne.

Team 1	Score	Team 2
SV Lyss	2–1 (a.e.t.)	Bümpliz

SV Lyss win and remain in the division. Bümpliz advance to play-outs against relegation.

== Group 3 ==
=== Teams ===
Club	Canton	Stadium	Capacity
FC Altstetten	Zürich	Buchlern	1,000
SC Brühl	St. Gallen	Paul-Grüninger-Stadion	4,200
FC Bülach	Zürich	Stadion Erachfeld	3,500
FC Frauenfeld	Thurgau	Kleine Allmend	6,370
FC Klus-Balsthal	Solothurn	Sportplatz Moos	4,000
FC Kölliken	Aargau	Sportstätte Walke	2,000
FC Muri	Aargau	Stadion Brühl	2,350
FC Pratteln	Basel-Country	In den Sandgruben	5,000
FC Red Star Zürich	Zürich	Allmend Brunau	2,000
SV Schaffhausen	Schaffhausen	Sportplatz Bühl	1,000
TSV St. Otmar St. Gallen	St. Gallen	Feldhandball-Rasen im Lerchenfeld	1,000
FC Suhr	Aargau	Hofstattmatten	2,000
FC Wiedikon	Zürich	Heuried	1,000
SC YF Juventus	Zürich	Utogrund	2,850

=== Final league table ===
Pos	Team	Pld	W	D	L	GF	GA	GD	Pts	Qualification or relegation
1	SC Brühl	26	16	8	2	61	24	+37	40	Play-off to Nationalliga B
2	FC Altstetten	26	15	9	2	56	23	+33	39	Play-off to Nationalliga B
3	FC Frauenfeld	26	15	8	3	62	25	+37	38	
4	SC Young Fellows Juventus	26	14	5	7	46	30	+16	33	
5	FC Suhr	26	10	8	8	46	39	+7	28	
6	FC Red Star Zürich	26	10	7	9	40	31	+9	27	
7	FC Bülach	26	10	6	10	35	41	−6	26	
8	FC Klus-Balsthal	26	9	5	12	34	40	−6	23	
9	SV Schaffhausen	26	5	13	8	25	32	−7	23	
10	FC Kölliken	26	5	10	11	30	47	−17	20	
11	FC Muri	26	4	10	12	29	51	−22	18	
12	TSV St. Otmar St. Gallen	26	5	7	14	32	54	−22	17	Play-out against relegation
13	FC Wiedikon	26	5	6	15	27	50	−23	16	Relegation to 2. Liga
14	FC Pratteln	26	5	6	15	21	57	−36	16	Relegation to 2. Liga

Source: RSSSF
Rules for classification: 1) Points; 2) Goal difference within the league, but play-off for qualifiers.

== Group 4 ==
=== Teams ===
Club	Canton	Stadium	Capacity
FC Ascona	Ticino	Stadio Comunale Ascona	1,400
SC Buochs	Nidwalden	Stadion Seefeld	5,000
FC Chiasso	Ticino	Stadio Comunale Riva IV	4,000
FC Chur	Grisons	Ringstrasse	2,820
FC Emmenbrücke	Lucerne	Stadion Gersag	8,700
FC Freienbach	Schwyz	Chrummen	4,500
FC Glarus	Glarus	Buchholz	800
FC Mendrisio	Ticino	Centro Sportivo Comunale	4,000
FC Stäfa	Zürich	Sportanlage Frohberg	1,500
FC Sursee	Lucerne	Stadion Schlottermilch	3,500
FC Tresa-Monteggio	Ticino	Cornaredo Stadium	6,330
FC Uznach	St. Gallen	Benknerstrasse	500
FC Vaduz	Liechtenstein	Rheinpark Stadion	7,584
Zug 94	Zug	Herti Allmend Stadion	6,000

=== Final league table ===
Pos	Team	Pld	W	D	L	GF	GA	GD	Pts	Qualification or relegation
1	FC Chiasso	26	17	5	4	48	17	+31	39	Play-off to Nationalliga B
2	FC Freienbach	26	14	9	3	43	22	+21	37	Play-off to Nationalliga B
3	FC Ascona	26	15	6	5	48	21	+27	36	
4	FC Sursee	26	11	10	5	33	18	+15	32	
5	SC Buochs	26	11	8	7	44	36	+8	30	
6	Zug 94	26	12	5	9	39	32	+7	29	
7	FC Glarus	26	9	6	11	33	37	−4	24	
8	FC Mendrisio	26	8	7	11	23	27	−4	23	
9	FC Vaduz	26	7	8	11	33	41	−8	22	
10	FC Tresa-Monteggio	26	6	10	10	25	34	−9	22	
11	FC Emmenbrücke	26	7	8	11	27	39	−12	22	
12	FC Stäfa	26	4	10	12	21	37	−16	18	Play-out against relegation
13	FC Uznach	26	4	8	14	24	51	−27	16	Relegation to 2. Liga
14	FC Chur	26	5	4	17	20	49	−29	14	Relegation to 2. Liga

Source: RSSSF
Rules for classification: 1) Points; 2) Goal difference within the league, but play-off for qualifiers.

== Promotion play-off ==
=== Qualification round ===
Team 1	Score	Team 2
Thun	1–1	Naters
Naters	2–0	Thun

Naters win 3–1 on aggregate and continue to the finals.

Team 1	Score	Team 2
Bulle	0–0	Münsingen
Münsingen	1–1	Bulle

1–1 on aggregate. Bulle win on away goals and continue to the finals.

Team 1	Score	Team 2
FC Altstetten	0–0	Chiasso
Chiasso	1–0	FC Altstetten

Chiasso win 1–0 on aggregate and continue to the finals.

Team 1	Score	Team 2
Freienbach	2–2	SC Brühl
SC Brühl	1–2	Freienbach

Freienbach win 4–3 on aggregate and continue to the finals.

=== Final round ===
Team 1	Score	Team 2
Naters	4–2	Bulle
Bulle	2–2	Naters

Naters win 6–2 on aggregate and are promoted to Nationalliga B.

Team 1	Score	Team 2
Chiasso	2–0	Freienbach
Freienbach	2–3	Chiasso

Chiasso win 5–2 on aggregate and are promoted to Nationalliga B.

== Relegation play-outs ==
Team 1	Score	Team 2
TSV St. Otmar St. Gallen	0–0	FC Stäfa
FC Stäfa	2–0	TSV St. Otmar St. Gallen

FC Stäfa win on 2–0 on aggregate. TSV St. Otmar St. Gallen are relegated to 2. Liga.

Team 1	Score	Team 2
Signal FC (Bernex)	2–3	Bümpliz
Bümpliz	4–1	Signal FC (Bernex)

Bümpliz win on 7–3 on aggregate. Signal FC (Bernex) are relegated to 2. Liga.

== See also ==
- 1994–95 Nationalliga A
- 1994–95 Nationalliga B
- 1994–95 Swiss Cup

== Sources ==
- Switzerland 1994–95 at RSSSF

Preceded by 1993–94	Seasons in Swiss 1. Liga	Succeeded by 1995–96
