= Harri Ylönen =

Finnish footballer (born 1972)

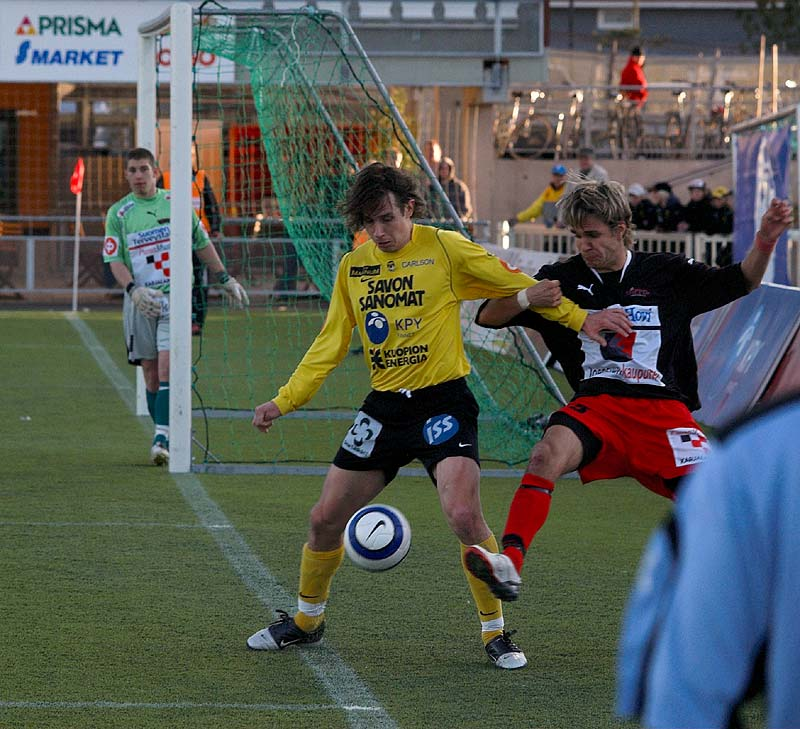
- Ylönen with KuPS in 2007

Personal information
- Full name: Harri Juhani Ylönen
- Date of birth: 21 December 1972 (age 53)
- Place of birth: Kuopio, Finland
- Height: 1.80 m (5 ft 11 in)
- Position: Defender

Senior career*
Years	Team	Apps	(Gls)
1991–1992	KuPS	56	(9)
1993–1998	Haka	139	(2)
1999–2001	Brann	69	(2)
2002–2004	Haka	73	(3)
2004–2005	Sportfreunde Siegen	9	(0)
2006	Haka	12	(1)
2007–2009	KuPS	23	(2)

International career
1995–2002	Finland	46	(1)

Managerial career
- 2008–2014: KuPS (assistant)
- 2014: KuPS
- * Club domestic league appearances and goals

Harri Juhani Ylönen (born 21 December 1972) is a Finnish former footballer and manager.

== Career statistics ==
=== Club ===
As of 1 September 2024.

Appearances and goals by club, season and competition
Club	Season	League			Cup (Note: Includes Suomen Cup)		Europe		Total	
Club	Season	Division	Apps	Goals	Apps	Goals	Apps	Goals	Apps	Goals
KuPS	1991	Veikkausliiga	26	4	–		–		26	4
KuPS	1992	Veikkausliiga	31	6	–		–		31	6
KuPS	Total		57	10	0	0	0	0	57	10
Haka	1993	Veikkausliiga	17	0	–		–		17	0
Haka	1994	Veikkausliiga	18	0	–		–		18	0
Haka	1995	Veikkausliiga	26	2	–		–		26	2
Haka	1996	Veikkausliiga	25	0	–		4 (Note: Appearances in UEFA Cup)	0	29	0
Haka	1997	Ykkönen	26	0	1	0	–		27	0
Haka	1998	Veikkausliiga	27	0	–		4 (Note: Appearances in UEFA Cup Winners' Cup)	0	31	0
Haka	Total		139	2	1	0	8	0	148	2
Brann	1999	Tippeligaen	26	1	6	0	2 (Note: Appearances in UEFA Intertoto Cup)	0	34	1
Brann	2000	Tippeligaen	25	0	2	0	4	0	31	0
Brann	2001	Tippeligaen	18	1	5	0	0	0	23	1
Brann	Total		69	2	13	0	6	0	88	2
Brann 2	2001	3. divisjon	1	0	–		–		1	0
Haka	2002	Veikkausliiga	27	0	1	1	4	0	32	1
Haka	2003	Veikkausliiga	20	1	0	0	2	0	22	1
Haka	2004	Veikkausliiga	26	2	0	0	4	0	30	2
Haka	Total		73	3	1	1	10	0	84	4
Sportfreunde Siegen	2004–05	Regionalliga Süd	8	0	–		–		8	0
Sportfreunde Siegen	2005–06	2. Bundesliga	1	0	–		–		1	0
Sportfreunde Siegen	Total		9	0	0	0	0	0	9	0
Sportfreunde Siegen II	2005–06	Oberliga Westfalen	4	0	–		–		4	0
Haka	2006	Veikkausliiga	12	1	–		1	0	13	1
KuPS	2007	Ykkönen	12	1	–		–		12	1
KuPS	2008	Veikkausliiga	20	2	–		–		20	2
KuPS	2009	Veikkausliiga	3	0	1	0	–		4	0
KuPS	Total		35	3	1	0	0	0	36	3
Career total			399	21	16	1	25	0	440	22

=== International goals ===
As of match played 16 February 1996. Finland score listed first, score column indicates score after each Ylönen goal.

List of international goals scored by Harri Ylönen
No.	Date	Venue	Opponent	Score	Result	Competition
1	16 February 1996	Rajamangala Stadium, Bangkok, Thailand	Thailand	1–0	2–5	Friendly

== Honours ==
Haka

- Veikkausliiga: 1995, 1998, 2004
- Finnish Cup: 1997, 2002

Sportfreunde Siegen

- Westphalian Cup: 2004–05
