= 1994 Intertoto Cup =

1994 edition of the Intertoto Cup, a European football competition

- 1994

Tournament information

Tournament statistics
- Matches played: 80
- Goals scored: 256 (3.2 per match)

In the 1994 Intertoto Cup no knock-out rounds were contested, and therefore no winner was declared.

== Group stage ==
The teams were divided into 8 groups of 5 teams each. Opponents played each other once.

=== Group 1 ===
Pos	Team	Pld	W	D	L	GF	GA	GD	Pts
1	(Sweden) Halmstads BK	4	2	1	1	5	5	0	5
2	(Bulgaria) Lokomotiv Sofia	4	2	1	1	10	11	−1	5
3	(Israel) Maccabi Netanya	4	1	2	1	5	5	0	4
4	(Czech Republic) Sparta Prague	4	1	1	2	8	7	+1	3
5	(Denmark) Silkeborg IF	4	1	1	2	8	8	0	3

=== Group 2 ===
Pos	Team	Pld	W	D	L	GF	GA	GD	Pts
1	(Switzerland) Young Boys	4	3	0	1	6	2	+4	6
2	(Israel) Hapoel Be'er Sheva	4	2	1	1	9	5	+4	5
3	(Romania) Electroputere Craiova	4	2	1	1	6	3	+3	5
4	(Germany) Karlsruhe	4	1	1	2	2	4	−2	3
5	(Sweden) Häcken	4	0	1	3	3	12	−9	1

=== Group 3 ===
Pos	Team	Pld	W	D	L	GF	GA	GD	Pts
1	(Sweden) AIK	4	3	1	0	9	5	+4	7
2	(Germany) Bayer Leverkusen	4	2	0	2	8	6	+2	4
3	(Netherlands) Sparta Rotterdam	3	1	1	1	6	6	0	3
4	(Switzerland) Lausanne-Sport	4	1	1	2	3	5	−2	3
5	(Austria) Tirol Innsbruck	3	0	1	2	1	5	−4	1

9 July 1994	Sparta Rotterdam (Netherlands)	3–1	(Switzerland) Lausanne-Sport	Hoek van Holland
	Winston Bogarde 40', 60'; Jos van Eck 55'		Francesco Di Jorio 55'	Stadium: Lemaireweg; Attendance: 500

16 July 1994	Bayer Leverkusen (Germany)	3–1	(Netherlands) Sparta Rotterdam	Leverkusen
	Bernd Schuster 41', 55'; Heiko Scholz 70'		Milco Pieren 30'	Stadium: Stadion Menzenberger Straße; Attendance: 800

27 July 1994	Tirol Innsbruck (Austria)	0–0	(Netherlands) Sparta Rotterdam	Innsbruck
(Note: The match was interrupted due to rain.)				Stadium: Tivoli Stadion Tirol; Attendance: 2,000; Referee: Konrad Plautz

30 July 1994	Sparta Rotterdam (Netherlands)	2–2	(Sweden) AIK	Rotterdam
	Dennis de Nooijer 30', 60'		Mattias Johansson 20'; Krister Nordin 50'	Stadium: Het Kasteel; Attendance: 3,000

=== Group 4 ===
Pos	Team	Pld	W	D	L	GF	GA	GD	Pts
1	(Germany) Hamburger SV	4	3	0	1	11	5	+6	6
2	(Hungary) Váci Izzó	4	3	0	1	10	5	+5	6
3	(Czech Republic) České Budějovice	4	2	1	1	5	4	+1	5
4	(Slovakia) Inter Bratislava	4	1	0	3	5	8	−3	2
5	(Denmark) Ikast FS	4	0	1	3	3	12	−9	1

=== Group 5 ===
Pos	Team	Pld	W	D	L	GF	GA	GD	Pts
1	(Hungary) Békéscsaba	4	3	0	1	14	7	+7	6
2	(Denmark) OB	4	2	0	2	11	6	+5	4
3	(Austria) Rapid Wien	4	2	0	2	4	6	−2	4
4	(Germany) Dynamo Dresden	4	1	1	2	6	6	0	3
5	(Switzerland) Sion	4	1	1	2	6	16	−10	3

=== Group 6 ===
Pos	Team	Pld	W	D	L	GF	GA	GD	Pts
1	(Slovakia) Slovan Bratislava	4	2	1	1	9	5	+4	5
2	(Czech Republic) Slavia Prague	4	2	1	1	9	6	+3	5
3	(Switzerland) Servette	4	2	0	2	5	8	−3	4
4	(Denmark) Brøndby IF	4	1	1	2	7	9	−2	3
5	(Austria) Admira Wacker	4	1	1	2	3	5	−2	3

=== Group 7 ===
Pos	Team	Pld	W	D	L	GF	GA	GD	Pts
1	(Switzerland) Grasshopper Club	4	3	0	1	9	2	+7	6
2	(Sweden) Trelleborgs FF	4	3	0	1	8	4	+4	6
3	(Denmark) AaB	4	2	0	2	6	9	−3	4
4	(Germany) MSV Duisburg	4	1	0	3	4	8	−4	2
5	(Slovakia) Dunajská Streda	4	1	0	3	3	7	−4	2

=== Group 8 ===
Pos	Team	Pld	W	D	L	GF	GA	GD	Pts
1	Austria Wien	4	1	3	0	7	3	+4	5
2	(Sweden) IFK Norrköping	4	1	3	0	7	5	+2	5
3	(Netherlands) Willem II	4	2	0	2	4	7	−3	4
4	(France) SM Caen	4	0	3	1	5	6	−1	3
5	(Denmark) Lyngby BK	4	0	3	1	6	8	−2	3

== See also ==
- 1994–95 UEFA Champions League
- 1994–95 UEFA Cup Winners' Cup
- 1994–95 UEFA Cup
