= 1998–99 in Swiss football =

Football in Switzerland
- Season: 1998–99

Men's football
- Nationalliga A: Servette
- Nationalliga B: Delémont
- 1. Liga: Overall; Bellinzona; Group 1: Echallens; Group 2: Fribourg; Group 3: Bellinzona; Group 4: Winterthur
- Swiss Cup: Lausanne-Sport

Women's football
- Swiss Women's Super League: Schwerzenbach
- Swiss Cup: FC Bern

The following is a summary of the 1998–99 season of competitive football in Switzerland.

== Nationalliga A ==
=== Qualification phase ===
Pos	Team	Pld	W	D	L	GF	GA	GD	Pts	Qualification
1	Servette	22	12	8	2	38	24	+14	44	Advance to championship round halved points (rounded up) as bonus
2	Grasshopper Club	22	11	5	6	37	25	+12	38	Advance to championship round halved points (rounded up) as bonus
3	Zürich	22	10	8	4	33	21	+12	38	Advance to championship round halved points (rounded up) as bonus
4	Lausanne-Sport	22	10	8	4	36	33	+3	38	Advance to championship round halved points (rounded up) as bonus
5	Xamax	22	7	11	4	30	23	+7	32	Advance to championship round halved points (rounded up) as bonus
6	Basel	22	8	4	10	21	34	−13	28	Advance to championship round halved points (rounded up) as bonus
7	Luzern	22	6	9	7	26	25	+1	27	Advance to championship round halved points (rounded up) as bonus
8	St. Gallen	22	7	6	9	31	31	0	27	Advance to championship round halved points (rounded up) as bonus
9	Sion	22	5	8	9	22	36	−14	23	Continue to promotion/relegation round
10	Lugano	22	5	7	10	35	43	−8	22	Continue to promotion/relegation round
11	Young Boys	22	4	7	11	33	34	−1	19	Continue to promotion/relegation round
12	Aarau	22	3	7	12	28	41	−13	16	Continue to promotion/relegation round

Source: rsssf.com
Rules for classification: 1) points; 2) goal difference; 3) number of goals scored.

=== Championship round ===
The first eight teams of the qualification phase competed in the Championship round. The teams took half of the points (rounded up to complete units) gained in the qualification as bonus with them.

Pos	Team	Pld	W	D	L	GF	GA	GD	BP	Pts	Qualification
1	Servette	14	7	3	4	19	14	+5	22	46	Swiss champions, qualified for Champions League third qualifying round
2	Grasshopper Club	14	8	3	3	31	11	+20	19	46	qualified for UEFA Cup qualifying round
3	Lausanne-Sport	14	8	2	4	28	20	+8	19	45	Swiss Cup winners, qualified for UEFA Cup first round
4	Zürich	14	7	2	5	24	15	+9	19	42	qualified for UEFA Cup qualifying round
5	Basel	14	5	4	5	18	19	−1	14	33	qualified for Intertoto Cup first round
6	Xamax	14	2	6	6	12	27	−15	16	28	qualified for Intertoto Cup first round
7	Luzern	14	4	2	8	13	27	−14	14	28	
8	St. Gallen	14	2	4	8	13	25	−12	14	24	

Source: rsssf.com
Rules for classification: 1) points; 2) Position in the qualification.

== Nationalliga B ==
=== Qualification phase ===
Pos	Team	Pld	W	D	L	GF	GA	GD	Pts	Qualification or relegation
1	Wil	22	12	7	3	45	27	+18	43	Advance to promotion/relegation NLA/LNB round
2	Delémont	22	12	4	6	43	27	+16	40	Advance to promotion/relegation NLA/LNB round
3	Étoile Carouge	22	11	7	4	29	19	+10	40	Advance to promotion/relegation NLA/LNB round
4	Yverdon-Sport	22	11	4	7	33	28	+5	37	Advance to promotion/relegation NLA/LNB round
5	Schaffhausen	22	10	5	7	36	31	+5	35	Continue to relegation round NLB/1. Liga halved points (rounded up) as bonus
6	Kriens	22	9	7	6	30	29	+1	34	Continue to relegation round NLB/1. Liga halved points (rounded up) as bonus
7	Locarno	22	8	4	10	21	26	−5	28	Continue to relegation round NLB/1. Liga halved points (rounded up) as bonus
8	Thun	22	6	7	9	28	33	−5	25	Continue to relegation round NLB/1. Liga halved points (rounded up) as bonus
9	Stade Nyonnais	22	4	10	8	33	36	−3	22	Continue to relegation round NLB/1. Liga halved points (rounded up) as bonus
10	Baden	22	6	4	12	31	36	−5	22	Continue to relegation round NLB/1. Liga halved points (rounded up) as bonus
11	Solothurn	22	4	6	12	27	40	−13	18	Continue to relegation round NLB/1. Liga halved points (rounded up) as bonus
12	Chiasso	22	2	9	11	14	38	−24	15	Continue to relegation round NLB/1. Liga halved points (rounded up) as bonus

Source: rsssf.com
Rules for classification: 1) Points; 2) Goal difference; 3) Goals scored; 4) Head-to-head points; 5) Away goals scored; 6) Draw.

=== Promotion/relegation group NLA/NLB ===
The teams in the ninth to twelfth positions in Nationalliga A competed with the top four teams of Nationalliga B in a Nationalliga A/B promotion/relegation round.

Pos	Team	Pld	W	D	L	GF	GA	GD	Pts	Qualification
1	Lugano	14	9	2	3	19	10	+9	29	Remain in NLA
2	Delémont	14	7	2	5	23	20	+3	23	Promoted to NLA
3	Yverdon-Sport	14	6	3	5	22	17	+5	21	Promoted to NLA
4	Aarau	14	6	2	6	24	24	0	20	Remain in NLA
5	Sion	14	6	1	7	16	17	−1	19	Relegated to NLB
6	Young Boys	14	5	2	7	25	31	−6	17	Relegated to NLB
7	Wil	14	5	1	8	26	30	−4	16	Remain in NLB
8	Étoile Carouge	14	4	3	7	18	24	−6	15	Remain in NLB

Source: RSSSF
Rules for classification: 1) Points; 2) Goal difference; 3) Goals scored; 4) Head-to-head points; 5) Away goals scored; 6) Draw.

=== Relegation group NLB/1. Liga ===
The last eight teams of the qualification phase competed in the relegation group against relegation to the 1. Liga. The teams took half of the points (rounded up to complete units) gained in the qualification as bonus with them.

Pos	Team	Pld	W	D	L	GF	GA	GD	BP	Pts	Qualification or relegation
1	Baden	14	7	4	3	25	18	+7	11	36	Remain in NLB
2	Thun	14	6	4	4	30	20	+10	13	35	Remain in NLB
3	Stade Nyonnais	14	7	3	4	29	22	+7	11	35	Remain in NLB
4	Kriens	14	5	3	6	19	18	+1	17	35	Remain in NLB
5	Schaffhausen	14	4	2	8	15	25	−10	18	32	Remain in NLB
6	Solothurn	14	5	6	3	20	19	+1	9	30	Remain in NLB
7	Locarno	14	3	3	8	14	29	−15	14	26	Relegated to 1. Liga
8	Chiasso	14	3	7	4	14	15	−1	8	24	Relegated to 1. Liga

Source: RSSSF
Rules for classification: 1) points; 2) Position in the qualification.

== 1. Liga ==
=== Group 1 ===
Pos	Team	Pld	W	D	L	GF	GA	GD	Pts	Qualification or relegation
1	FC Echallens	26	19	4	3	51	15	+36	61	Play-off to Nationalliga B
2	Vevey Sports	26	14	7	5	57	34	+23	49	Play-off to Nationalliga B
3	FC Bex	26	14	4	8	51	37	+14	46	
4	FC Meyrin	26	13	4	9	58	44	+14	43	
5	FC Naters	26	11	9	6	41	34	+7	42	
6	CS Chênois	26	11	7	8	36	27	+9	40	
7	FC Martigny-Sports	26	10	6	10	54	52	+2	36	
8	Grand-Lancy FC	26	8	8	10	32	36	−4	32	
9	FC Renens	26	8	7	11	40	40	0	31	
10	Signal FC	26	8	7	11	39	57	−18	31	
11	FC Stade Lausanne	26	8	6	12	40	48	−8	30	
12	FC Montreux-Sports	26	7	4	15	27	47	−20	25	Play-out against relegation
13	FC Monthey	26	5	5	16	21	45	−24	20	Relegation to 2. Liga
14	FC Bramois	26	5	4	17	29	60	−31	19	Relegation to 2. Liga

Source: RSSSF
Rules for classification: 1) Points; 2) Goal difference within the league, but play-off for qualifiers.

=== Group 2 ===
Pos	Team	Pld	W	D	L	GF	GA	GD	Pts	Qualification or relegation
1	FC Fribourg	26	18	5	3	69	28	+41	59	Play-off to Nationalliga B
2	FC Münsingen	26	16	7	3	58	24	+34	55	Play-off to Nationalliga B
3	FC Serrières	26	15	7	4	51	26	+25	52	
4	FC Biel-Bienne	26	13	9	4	42	25	+17	48	
5	FC Grenchen	26	13	5	8	49	30	+19	44	
6	FC Bulle	26	9	9	8	35	40	−5	36	
7	FC La Chaux-de-Fonds	26	8	8	10	27	41	−14	32	
8	SC Bümpliz 78	26	8	7	11	27	41	−14	31	
9	SV Lyss	26	7	6	13	26	39	−13	27	
10	SV Muttenz	26	6	8	12	31	47	−16	26	
11	FC Concordia Basel	26	5	9	12	33	43	−10	24	
12	FC Colombier	26	6	5	15	29	41	−12	23	Play-out against relegation
13	FC Riehen	26	6	4	16	33	67	−34	22	Relegation to 2. Liga
14	FC Köniz	26	4	7	15	30	48	−18	19	Relegation to 2. Liga

Source: RSSSF
Rules for classification: 1) Points; 2) Goal difference within the league, but play-off for qualifiers.

=== Group 3 ===
Pos	Team	Pld	W	D	L	GF	GA	GD	Pts	Qualification or relegation
1	AC Bellinzona	26	21	4	1	76	22	+54	67	Play-off to Nationalliga B
2	SC Buochs	26	17	3	6	66	37	+29	54	Play-off to Nationalliga B
3	FC Schötz	26	11	9	6	63	38	+25	42	
4	FC Sursee	26	12	4	10	42	48	−6	40	
5	FC Wangen bei Olten	26	10	9	7	46	42	+4	39	
6	FC Red Star Zürich	26	8	12	6	34	30	+4	36	
7	FC Altstetten	26	9	7	10	38	41	−3	34	
8	Zug 94	26	9	6	11	33	41	−8	33	
9	FC Malcantone Agno	26	7	11	8	32	37	−5	32	
10	FC Ascona	26	7	8	11	39	48	−9	29	
11	SC Young Fellows Juventus	26	7	7	12	27	38	−11	28	
12	FC Küsnacht	26	7	5	14	30	50	−20	26	Play-out against relegation
13	GC Biaschesi	26	4	7	15	23	47	−24	19	Relegation to 2. Liga
14	FC Muri	26	4	6	16	19	49	−30	18	Relegation to 2. Liga

Source: RSSSF
Rules for classification: 1) Points; 2) Goal difference within the league, but play-off for qualifiers.

=== Group 4 ===
Pos	Team	Pld	W	D	L	GF	GA	GD	Pts	Qualification or relegation
1	FC Winterthur	26	21	4	1	98	12	+86	67	Play-off to Nationalliga B
2	FC Vaduz	26	15	5	6	49	32	+17	50	Play-off to Nationalliga B
3	FC Rapperswil-Jona	26	11	7	8	44	38	+6	40	
4	FC Tuggen	26	10	9	7	42	34	+8	39	
5	FC Rorschach	26	11	5	10	35	50	−15	38	
6	FC Frauenfeld	26	10	7	9	43	38	+5	37	
7	FC Horgen	26	9	8	9	42	49	−7	35	
8	FC Kreuzlingen	26	7	10	9	28	35	−7	31	
9	SV Schaffhausen	26	7	10	9	22	33	−11	31	
10	FC Widnau	26	5	13	8	26	44	−18	28	
11	FC Freienbach	26	7	7	12	37	56	−19	28	
12	FC Gossau	26	6	8	12	42	43	−1	26	Play-out against relegation
13	SC Veltheim	26	6	6	14	35	46	−11	24	Relegation to 2. Liga
14	FC Wetzikon	26	4	7	15	18	51	−33	19	Relegation to 2. Liga

Source: RSSSF
Rules for classification: 1) Points; 2) Goal difference within the league, but play-off for qualifiers.

=== Promotion play-off ===
Qualification round

Team 1	Score	Team 2
Winterthur	0–0	Buochs
Buochs	0–4	Winterthur

Winterthur win 4–0 on aggregate and continue to the finals.

Team 1	Score	Team 2
Vevey Sports	0–0	Fribourg
Fribourg	2–4	Vevey Sports

Vevey Sports win 4–2 on aggregate and continue to the finals.

Team 1	Score	Team 2
Münsingen	1–1	FC Echallens
FC Echallens	1–2	Münsingen

Münsingen win 3–2 on aggregate and continue to the finals.

Team 1	Score	Team 2
Bellinzona	3–0	Vaduz
Vaduz	0–2	Bellinzona

Bellinzona win 5–0 on aggregate and continue to the finals.

Final round

Team 1	Score	Team 2
Winterthur	3–0	Münsingen
Münsingen	1–0	Winterthur

Winterthur win 3–1 on aggregate and are promoted to Nationalliga B.

Team 1	Score	Team 2
Bellinzona	9–0	Vevey Sports
Vevey Sports	0–5	Bellinzona

Bellinzona win 14–0 on aggregate and are promoted to Nationalliga B.

=== Relegation play-out ===
First round

Team 1	Score	Team 2
Montreux-Sports	1–3	Colombier

Montreux-Sports continue to the final.

Team 1	Score	Team 2
Küsnacht	1–3	Gossau

Küsnacht continue to the final.

Final round

Team 1	Score	Team 2
Montreux-Sports	1–2	Küsnacht
Küsnacht	4–0	Montreux-Sports

Küsnacht win 6–1 on aggregate. Montreux-Sports are relegated to 2. Liga.

== Swiss Cup ==
The route of the finalists to the final:

- Round five: FC Bulle-LS 1–5. FC Winterthur-GC 1–2.
- Round six: FC Wil-LS 1–4. Stade Nyonnais-GC 1–1 a.e.t. 2–4 after penalties.
- Quarter-finals: SR Delémont-LS 1–2. FC Luzern-GC 1–2.
- Semi-finals: Servette FC-LS 0–1. FC Red Star Zürich-GC 0–7.

The winners of the first drawn semi-final is considered as home team in the final.

Final

13 June 1999
15:00

Lausanne-Sport	2 – 0	Grasshopper Club
Diogo 36'; Diogo (yellow card) 57'; Celestini (yellow card) 79'; Mazzoni 90'	Report	(yellow card) 15' Tararache; (yellow card) 67' Comisetti

Wankdorf, Bern
Attendance: 18,000
Referee: (Liechtenstein) Roland Beck

== Swiss clubs in Europe ==
- Grasshopper Club as 1997–98 Nationalliga A champions: Champions League first qualifying round
- Servette as runners-up: UEFA Cup second qualifying round
- Zürich as fourth placed team: UEFA Cup second qualifying round
- Lausanne-Sport as 1997–98 Swiss Cup winners: Cup Winners' Cup qualifying round
- Sion: Intertoto Cup first round
- St. Gallen: Intertoto Cup first round
- Vaduz as 1997–98 Liechtenstein Cup winners: Cup Winners' Cup qualifying round

=== Grasshoppers ===
==== Champions League ====
===== First qualifying round =====
22 July 1998 First leg	Grasshopper Club (Switzerland)	6–0	(Luxembourg) Jeunesse Esch	Hardturm, Zürich
19:30	Nkufo 6', 51'; Kavelashvili 28'; Cabanas 41'; Tikva 65' (pen.); Tararache 90'	Report		Attendance: 4,800; Referee: Serguei Goussev (Russia)

29 July 1998 Second leg	Jeunesse Esch (Luxembourg)	0–2	(Switzerland) Grasshopper Club	Stade de la Frontière, Esch-sur-Alzette
20:00		Report	Esposito 36'; Türkyilmaz 44'	Attendance: 612; Referee: John McDermott (Republic of Ireland)

Grasshopper won 8–0 on aggregate.

===== Second qualifying round =====
12 August 1998 First leg	Galatasaray (Turkey)	2–1	(Switzerland) Grasshopper Club	Ali Sami Yen Stadium, Istanbul
19:00	Hagi 58' (pen.); Şükür 66'	Report	Vogel 85' (pen.)	Attendance: 21,043; Referee: Marc Batta (France)

26 August 1998 Second leg	Grasshopper Club (Switzerland)	2–3	(Turkey) Galatasaray	Hardturm, Zürich
20:00	Türkyilmaz 50'; Vogel 70' (pen.)	Report	Şükür 17', 46'; Hagi 64' (pen.)	Attendance: 15,000; Referee: Vítor Melo Pereira (Portugal)

Galatasaray won 5–3 on aggregate. Grasshoppers transferred to the first round of the UEFA Cup.

==== UEFA Cup ====
===== First round =====
16 September 1998 First leg	Anderlecht (Belgium)	0–2	(Switzerland) Grasshopper	Constant Vanden Stock Stadium, Brussels
18:00 (CET)		Report	Comisetti 52'; Tikva 56'	Attendance: 10,430; Referee: Marcel Lică (Romania)

29 September 1998 Second leg	Grasshopper (Switzerland)	0–0	(Belgium) Anderlecht	Hardturm, Zürich
20:15 (CET)		Report		Attendance: 7,400; Referee: Georgios Bikas (Greece)

Grasshoppers won 2–0 on aggregate.

===== Second round =====
20 October 1998 First leg	Grasshopper (Switzerland)	0–2	(Italy) Fiorentina	Hardturm, Zürich
19:00 (CET)		Report	Batistuta 20'; Robbiati 48'	Attendance: 16,000; Referee: Graham Poll (England)

3 November 1998 Second leg	Fiorentina (Italy)	0–3 (awarded)	(Switzerland) Grasshopper	Stadio Arechi, Salerno
20:45 (CET)	Oliveira 12', 39'	Report	Gren 31'	Attendance: 40,000; Referee: Michel Piraux (Belgium)

The match was abandoned at half-time after the fourth official, Philippe Flament of Belgium, sustained a knee injury and bruising from a firecracker thrown onto the pitch by fans in the stands. At the moment of the incident, Fiorentina led 2–1 on the night and 4-1 on aggregate. Four days later at a UEFA emergency meeting, Fiorentina was kicked out of the UEFA Cup and the match was recorded as a 0–3 Grasshopper win. Future expulsion from European competition for Fiorentina was also considered by UEFA but eventually ruled out because of mitigating circumstances, specifically that the match, as part of an earlier punishment, was not played at Fiorentina's home stadium but in Salerno and credible evidence that the firecracker was likely thrown by fans of the local club Salernitana holding a grudge following a recent Serie A fixture between the two clubs.
Grasshopper won 3–2 on aggregate.

===== Third round =====
24 November 1998 First leg	Grasshopper (Switzerland)	3–3	(France) Bordeaux	Letzigrund, Zürich
18:30 (CET)	Kavelashvili 20'; Türkyilmaz 32'; Comisetti 53'	Report	Wiltord 5', 73'; Micoud 19'	Attendance: 7,200; Referee: Atanas Uzunov (Bulgaria)

8 December 1998 Second leg	Bordeaux (France)	0–0	(Switzerland) Grasshopper	Stade du Parc Lescure, Bordeaux
19:30 (CET)		Report		Attendance: 18,000; Referee: Ryszard Wójcik (Poland)

3–3 on aggregate; Bordeaux won on away goals.

=== Servette ===
==== UEFA Cup ====
===== Second qualifying round =====
11 August 1998 First leg	Germinal Ekeren (Belgium)	1–4	(Switzerland) Servette	Antwerp
	Morhaye 85'	Report	Rey 21' (pen.) 51'; Wolf 36'; Durix 79'

25 August 1998 Second leg	Servette (Switzerland)	1–2	(Belgium) Germinal Ekeren	Geneva
	Rey 83' (pen.)	Report	Fournier 6' (o.g.); Karagiannis 43'

Servette won 5–3 on aggregate.

===== First round =====
15 September 1998 First leg	Servette (Switzerland)	2–1	(Bulgaria) CSKA Sofia	Charmilles Stadium, Geneva
20:00 (CET)	Pizzinat 84'; Melunović 89'	Report	Stanchev 45'	Attendance: 5,200; Referee: Sándor Puhl (Hungary)

29 September 1998 Second leg	CSKA Sofia (Bulgaria)	1–0	(Switzerland) Servette	Balgarska Armia Stadium, Sofia
17:00 (CET)	Stanchev 10'	Report		Attendance: 15,000; Referee: Claus Bo Larsen (Denmark)

2–2 on aggregate; CSKA Sofia won on away goals.

=== Zürich ===
==== UEFA Cup ====
===== Second qualifying round =====
11 August 1998 First leg	Zürich (Switzerland)	4–0	(Ukraine) Shakhtar Donetsk	Letzigrund, Zürich
21:30	Sant'Anna 1'; Đorđević 61'; Chassot 71'; Tarone 88'	Report		Attendance: 8,000; Referee: Fernand Meese (Belgium)

25 August 1998 Second leg	Shakhtar Donetsk (Ukraine)	3–2	(Switzerland) Zürich	Shakhtar Stadium, Donetsk
19:00	Orbu 24', 69'; Štolcers 90'	Report	Bartlett 16', 26'	Attendance: 13,000; Referee: Dani Koren (Israel)

Zürich won 6–3 on aggregate.

===== First round =====
15 September 1998 First leg	Zürich (Switzerland)	4–0	(Cyprus) Anorthosis Famagusta	Letzigrund, Zürich
20:00 (CET)	Nixon 35'; Hodel 58'; Bartlett 69'; Chassot 81'	Report		Attendance: 4,100; Referee: Sergey Shmolik (Belarus)

29 September 1998 Second leg	Anorthosis Famagusta (Cyprus)	2–3	(Switzerland) Zürich	Antonis Papadopoulos Stadium, Larnaca
19:00 (CET)	Fischer 45' (o.g.); Krčmarević 73'	Report	Sant'Anna 12'; Bartlett 38', 62'	Attendance: 4,000; Referee: Kenny Clark (Scotland)

Zürich won 7–2 on aggregate.

===== Second round =====
20 October 1998 First leg	Celtic (Scotland)	1–1	(Switzerland) Zürich	Celtic Park, Glasgow
21:00 (CET)	Brattbakk 23'	Report	Fischer 78'	Attendance: 41,120; Referee: Vasyl Melnychuk (Ukraine)

3 November 1998 Second leg	Zürich (Switzerland)	4–2	(Scotland) Celtic	Letzigrund, Zürich
20:15 (CET)	Del Signore 51'; Chassot 55'; Bartlett 61'; Sant'Anna 75'	Report	O'Donnell 53'; Larsson 72'	Attendance: 15,500; Referee: Leif Sundell (Sweden)

Zürich won 5–3 on aggregate.

===== Third round =====
24 November 1998 First leg	Roma (Italy)	1–0	(Switzerland) Zürich	Stadio Olimpico, Rome
16:00 (CET)	Totti 90' (pen.)	Report		Attendance: 19,375; Referee: William Young (Scotland)

8 December 1998 Second leg	Zürich (Switzerland)	2–2	(Italy) Roma	Letzigrund, Zürich
20:45 (CET)	Bartlett 60', 79'	Report	Delvecchio 14'; Totti 90'	Attendance: 15,200; Referee: Manuel Díaz Vega (Spain)

Roma won 3–2 on aggregate.

=== Lausanne-Sport ===
==== Cup Winners' Cup ====
===== Qualifying round =====
13 August 1998 First leg	Lausanne-Sport (Switzerland)	5–1	(Armenia) Tsement Ararat	Stade Olympique de la Pontaise, Lausanne
19:30	Celestini 29', 47', 59', 70'; Cavin 70'	Report	T. Hovhannisyan 36'	Attendance: 3,500; Referee: Stefan Ormandzhiev (Bulgaria)

27 August 1998 Second leg	Tsement Ararat (Armenia)	1–2	(Switzerland) Lausanne-Sport	Hrazdan Stadium, Yerevan
18:00	Asatryan 39'	Report	Douglas 66'; Hottiger 89'	Attendance: 1,500; Referee: Frank De Bleeckere (Belgium)

Lausanne-Sport won 7–2 on aggregate.

===== First round =====
17 September 1998 First leg	Lazio (Italy)	1–1	(Switzerland) Lausanne-Sport	Stadio Olimpico, Rome
20:45	Nedvěd 37'	Report	Douglas 54'	Attendance: 22,659; Referee: Dani Koren (Israel)

1 October 1998 Second leg	Lausanne-Sport (Switzerland)	2–2	(Italy) Lazio	Stade Olympique de la Pontaise, Lausanne
20:45	Douglas 10'; Rehn 84'	Report	Salas 7'; Sérgio Conceição 26'	Attendance: 12,500; Referee: Kyros Vassaras (Greece)

3–3 on aggregate; Lazio won on away goals.

=== Sion ===
==== Intertoto Cup ====
===== First round =====
21 June 1998 First leg	TPS (Finland)	0–1	(Switzerland) Sion	Veritas Stadion, Turku
		Report	Pascale 72'	Attendance: 400; Referee: Kristinn Jakobsson (Iceland)

28 June 1998 Second leg	Sion (Switzerland)	2–3	(Finland) TPS	Stade Tourbillon, Sion
	Derivaz 41'; Ouattara 85'	Report	Kaijasilta 10', 89'; Puhakainen 75'	Attendance: 1,350; Referee: Slavik Kazaryan (Armenia)

TPS 3–3 Sion on aggregate. TPS won on away goals rule.

=== St. Gallen ===
==== Intertoto Cup ====
===== First round =====
20 June 1998 First leg	St. Gallen (Switzerland)	3–2	(Estonia) Tulevik Viljandi	Espenmoos, St. Gallen
	Yakin 31', 58'; Hellinga 38' (pen.)		Lell 4'; Pari 88'	Attendance: 717; Referee: Bujar Pregja (Albania)

27 June 1998 Second leg	Tulevik Viljandi (Estonia)	1–6	(Switzerland) St. Gallen	Linnastaadion, Viljandi
	Arbeiter 10'		Contini 7'; Tsawa 42'; Yakin 43'; Vurens 60' dal Santo 79', 87'	Attendance: 185; Referee: Eyjölfur Ólafsson (Iceland)

St. Gallen won 9–3 on aggregate.

===== Second round =====
5 July 1998 First leg	Austria Salzburg	3–1	(Switzerland) St. Gallen	Stadion Lehen, Salzburg
	Kitzbichler 44'; Glieder 53', 61' (pen.)	Report	Vurens 84'	Attendance: 1,500; Referee: Pasquale Rodomonti (Italy)

11 July 1998 Second leg	St. Gallen (Switzerland)	1–0	Austria Salzburg	Espenmoos, St. Gallen
	Zwyssig 90'	Report		Attendance: 1,700; Referee: Edo Trivković (Croatia)

Austria Salzburg won 3–2 on aggregate.

=== Vaduz ===
==== Cup Winners' Cup ====
===== Qualifying round =====
13 August 1998 First leg	Vaduz (Liechtenstein)	0–2	(Sweden) Helsingborg	Rheinpark Stadion, Vaduz
20:00		Report	Stavrum 9'; Wibrån 67'	Attendance: 950; Referee: Gerard Perry (Republic of Ireland)

27 August 1998 Second leg	Helsingborg (Sweden)	3–0	(Liechtenstein) Vaduz	Olympia, Helsingborg
19:00	Wibrån 43'; Edman 57'; Powell 67'	Report		Attendance: 3,600; Referee: Andrei Butenko (Russia)

Helsingborg won 5–0 on aggregate.

== Sources ==
- Switzerland 1998–99 at RSSSF
- Switzerland Cup 1998–99 at RSSSF
- Cup finals at Fussball-Schweiz
- UEFA Intertoto Cup 1998 at RSSSF
- Josef Zindel (2018). FC Basel 1893. Die ersten 125 Jahre (in German). Basel: Friedrich Reinhardt Verlag. ISBN 978-3-7245-2305-5.

Preceded by 1997–98	Seasons in Swiss football	Succeeded by 1999–2000
