= Johann Vogel (footballer) =

Swiss footballer (born 1977)

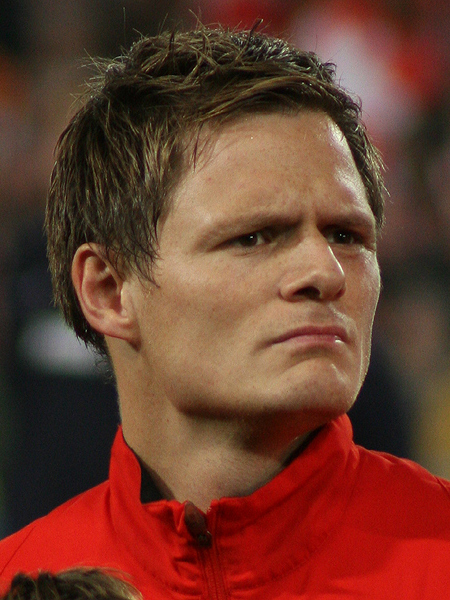
- Vogel in 2006

Personal information
- Full name: Johann Louis François Vogel
- Date of birth: 8 March 1977 (age 49)
- Place of birth: Geneva, Switzerland
- Height: 1.75 m (5 ft 9 in)
- Position: Midfielder

Youth career
- 1984–1992: FC Meyrin

Senior career*
Years	Team	Apps	(Gls)
1992–1999	Grasshoppers	133	(13)
1999–2005	PSV	169	(7)
2005–2006	A.C. Milan	14	(0)
2006–2007	Betis	17	(0)
2008–2009	Blackburn Rovers	7	(0)
2012	Grasshoppers	3	(0)
Total		343	(20)

International career
	Switzerland U21	7	(0)
1995–2007	Switzerland	94	(2)
- * Club domestic league appearances and goals

Johann Louis François Vogel (born 8 March 1977) is a Swiss former professional footballer who played as a midfielder. He spent much of his professional career with Grasshopper Club Zürich and PSV. In his later career, he played for A.C. Milan, Betis, and Blackburn Rovers before returning to Grasshoppers. At international level, he amassed 94 caps scoring twice for the Switzerland national team.

== Club career ==
=== Early career ===
Born in Geneva, to German father, and Swiss mother, Vogel joined Swiss amateur club FC Meyrin in his youth, but made the cut into professional football by joining Grasshopper Club Zürich. In his time at Grasshoppers, he usually played central defence or rightback although on occasion, he could be called to feature in a central defensive midfield role.

In his role as a defensive midfield player, in which he uses his ability to pass accurately and to effectively retain possession of the ball, Vogel can be counted on to add depth to either defence or attack.

=== PSV and AC Milan ===
Dutch club PSV sought his services in 1999 and he became a prominent member of the team until he decided to leave to join A.C. Milan at the end of the 2004–05 season. In his final season with PSV, he was noted for forming a formidable midfield partnership with Mark van Bommel and Phillip Cocu where the club managed to reach the semi-finals of the Champions League tournament.

=== Real Betis ===
On 31 August 2006, he joined Real Betis in an exchange deal for Ricardo Oliveira. Vogel made his Betis debut against Athletic Bilbao on 10 September 2006 at the Manuel Ruiz de Lopera, which Betis won 3–0.

Vogel made his last La Liga appearance for Betis on 19 May 2007 against Tarragona. On 27 December 2007, he agreed to leave Betis after suing them.

Everton confirmed they were in talks to sign the player after being told he could leave his then club Real Betis in July 2007. However the deal hit problems due to Real Betis wanting payment for him.

=== Blackburn Rovers ===
On 18 March 2008, he agreed a two-and-a-half-year contract (with Blackburn having an option for a further year) with Mark Hughes' Blackburn Rovers. Vogel joined fellow Swiss footballers Stéphane Henchoz and Bruno Berner at Ewood Park, as well as his former PSV-colleague André Ooijer. After receiving International clearance to play for Blackburn Rovers on 25 March, he was given the number 8 shirt by Mark Hughes, the shirt vacated by Robbie Savage after his move to Derby County.

Vogel made his debut for Rovers on 5 April against Tottenham Hotspur.

However, in the 2008–09 season, Vogel found himself frozen out at Ewood Park. He came on as a substitute in a 3–1 defeat by Liverpool.

On 7 April 2009, his contract was terminated by Blackburn Rovers with immediate effect and by mutual consent. After that, he announced his retirement from professional football.

=== Grasshoppers comeback ===
Two and a half years after his retirement, Vogel decided to return to the field again. He made comeback with Grasshoppers where he made his professional debut and appeared in the starting line-up against FC Thun on 5 February 2012. After appearing in another two league matches, he retired for the second time.

== International career ==
Vogel made his debut for Switzerland on 8 March 1995 in a 1–1 draw against Greece. Vogel has played in Euro 1996, Euro 2004, 2006 World Cup and has made 94 appearances in total for his country. He scored his first goal on 10 March 1999 in a friendly against Austria.

Until 8 March 2007, he was the captain of Switzerland.

== Career statistics ==
=== Club ===
Appearances and goals by club, season and competition
Club	Season	League			National cup		League cup		Continental		Total	
Club	Season	Division	Apps	Goals	Apps	Goals	Apps	Goals	Apps	Goals	Apps	Goals
Grasshoppers	1992–93	Swiss Super League	3	0	—		—		—		3	0
Grasshoppers	1993–94	Swiss Super League	4	0	—		—		—		4	0
Grasshoppers	1994–95	Swiss Super League	23	0	—		—		—		23	0
Grasshoppers	1995–96	Swiss Super League	24	0	—		—		—		24	0
Grasshoppers	1996–97	Swiss Super League	28	3	—		—		—		28	3
Grasshoppers	1997–98	Swiss Super League	24	5	—		—		1	0	25	5
Grasshoppers	1998–99	Swiss Super League	27	5	—		—		—		27	5
Grasshoppers	Total		133	13			0	0	1	0	134	13
PSV	1999–00	Eredivisie	31	2	—		—		4	0	35	2
PSV	2000–01	Eredivisie	30	1	1	0	—		10	0	41	1
PSV	2001–02	Eredivisie	25	1	—		—		8	0	33	1
PSV	2002–03	Eredivisie	32	1	—		—		6	0	38	1
PSV	2003–04	Eredivisie	24	1	—		—		7	0	31	1
PSV	2004–05	Eredivisie	27	1	—		—		13	0	40	1
PSV	Total		169	7	1	0	—		48	0	218	7
A.C. Milan	2005–06	Serie A	14	0	3	0	—	—	5	0	22	0
Betis	2006–07	La Liga	17	0	1	0	—		—		18	0
Betis	2007–08	La Liga	0	0	—		—		—		0	0
Betis	Total		17	0	1	0	—		—		18	0
Blackburn Rovers	2007–08	Premier League	6	0	—		—		—		6	0
Blackburn Rovers	2008–09	Premier League	1	0	—		—		—		1	0
Blackburn Rovers	Total		7	0	—		—		—		7	0
Grasshoppers	2011–12	Swiss Super League	3	0	—		—		—		3	0
Career total			343	20	2	0	—		54	0	399	20

=== International ===
#	Date	Venue	Opponent	Score	Result	Competition
1.	10 March 1999	Espenmoos, St. Gallen	Austria	1–1	2–4	Friendly
2.	15 August 2001	Ernst-Happel-Stadion, Vienna	Austria	1–0	2–1	Friendly

== Honours ==
Grasshoppers

- Swiss National League A: 1994–95, 1995–96, 1997–98
- Swiss Cup: 1994

PSV Eindhoven

- Eredivisie: 1999–00, 2000–01, 2002–03, 2004–05
- KNVB Cup: 2004–05
- Johan Cruijff-schaal: 2000, 2001, 2003

Individual

- Dutch Footballer of the Year: 2001
