= 1996–97 in Swiss football =

Football in Switzerland
- Season: 1996–97

Men's football
- Nationalliga A: Sion
- Nationalliga B: Étoile Carouge
- 1. Liga: Overall; Thun; Group 1: FC Renens; Group 2: Serrières; Group 3: FC Ascona; Group 4: Tuggen
- Swiss Cup: Sion

Women's football
- Swiss Women's Super League: FFC Bern
- Swiss Cup: FFC Bern

The following is a summary of the 1996–97 season of competitive football in Switzerland.

== Nationalliga A ==
=== Qualification phase ===
Pos	Team	Pld	W	D	L	GF	GA	GD	Pts	Qualification
1	Xamax	22	12	8	2	36	20	+16	44	Advance to championship round halved points (rounded up) as bonus
2	Grasshopper Club	22	10	9	3	42	27	+15	39	Advance to championship round halved points (rounded up) as bonus
3	Sion	22	9	10	3	33	21	+12	37	Advance to championship round halved points (rounded up) as bonus
4	Aarau	22	9	8	5	21	14	+7	35	Advance to championship round halved points (rounded up) as bonus
5	Lausanne-Sports	22	9	7	6	35	32	+3	34	Advance to championship round halved points (rounded up) as bonus
6	St. Gallen	22	6	10	6	20	26	−6	28	Advance to championship round halved points (rounded up) as bonus
7	Zürich	22	6	9	7	24	25	−1	27	Advance to championship round halved points (rounded up) as bonus
8	Basel	22	5	11	6	32	32	0	26	Advance to championship round halved points (rounded up) as bonus
9	Servette	22	5	9	8	24	25	−1	24	Continue to promotion/relegation round
10	Luzern	22	4	11	7	27	32	−5	23	Continue to promotion/relegation round
11	Lugano	22	2	9	11	14	32	−18	15	Continue to promotion/relegation round
12	Young Boys	22	3	3	16	17	39	−22	12	Continue to promotion/relegation round

Source: rsssf.com
Rules for classification: 1) Points; 2) Goal difference; 3) Goals scored; 4) Head-to-head points; 5) Away goals scored; 6) Draw.

=== Championship group ===
The first eight teams of the qualification phase competed in the Championship round. The teams took half of the points (rounded up to complete units) gained in the qualification as bonus with them.

Pos	Team	Pld	W	D	L	GF	GA	GD	BP	Pts	Qualification
1	Sion	14	9	3	2	18	10	+8	19	49	Swiss champions, qualified for 1997–98 Champions League
2	Xamax	14	6	6	2	22	14	+8	22	46	qualified for 1997–98 UEFA Cup
3	Grasshopper Club	14	7	4	3	37	18	+19	20	45	qualified for 1997–98 UEFA Cup
4	Lausanne-Sports	14	8	2	4	20	16	+4	17	43	entered 1997 UEFA Intertoto Cup
5	Aarau	14	3	4	7	17	22	−5	18	31	entered 1997 UEFA Intertoto Cup
6	St. Gallen	14	3	4	7	13	26	−13	14	27	
7	Zürich	14	1	7	6	9	18	−9	14	24	
8	Basel	14	3	2	9	16	28	−12	13	24	

Source: rsssf.com
Rules for classification: 1) points; 2) Position in the qualification.

== Nationalliga B ==
=== Qualification phase ===
Pos	Team	Pld	W	D	L	GF	GA	GD	Pts	Qualification or relegation
1	Étoile Carouge	22	11	9	2	39	20	+19	42	Advance to promotion/relegation NLA/LNB round
2	FC Schaffhausen	22	12	6	4	32	18	+14	42	Advance to promotion/relegation NLA/LNB round
3	Kriens	22	12	5	5	40	25	+15	41	Advance to promotion/relegation NLA/LNB round
4	Solothurn	22	10	7	5	28	26	+2	37	Advance to promotion/relegation NLA/LNB round
5	Yverdon-Sport	22	9	8	5	34	26	+8	35	Continue to relegation round NLB/1. Liga halved points (rounded up) as bonus
6	Winterthur	22	9	7	6	30	21	+9	34	Continue to relegation round NLB/1. Liga halved points (rounded up) as bonus
7	Locarno	22	7	7	8	28	27	+1	28	Continue to relegation round NLB/1. Liga halved points (rounded up) as bonus
8	Wil	22	7	6	9	33	30	+3	27	Continue to relegation round NLB/1. Liga halved points (rounded up) as bonus
9	Baden	22	7	6	9	29	30	−1	27	Continue to relegation round NLB/1. Liga halved points (rounded up) as bonus
10	Delémont	22	5	5	12	30	44	−14	20	Continue to relegation round NLB/1. Liga halved points (rounded up) as bonus
11	Gossau	22	4	4	14	29	50	−21	16	Continue to relegation round NLB/1. Liga halved points (rounded up) as bonus
12	Meyrin	22	2	4	16	15	50	−35	10	Continue to relegation round NLB/1. Liga halved points (rounded up) as bonus

Source: rsssf.com
Rules for classification: 1) Points; 2) Goal difference; 3) Goals scored; 4) Head-to-head points; 5) Away goals scored; 6) Draw.

=== Promotion/relegation group NLA/NLB ===
The teams in the ninth to twelfth positions in Nationalliga A competed with the top four teams of Nationalliga B in a Nationalliga A/B promotion/relegation round.

Pos	Team	Pld	W	D	L	GF	GA	GD	Pts	Qualification
1	Servette	14	7	4	3	18	10	+8	25	Remain in 1997–98 Nationalliga A
2	Étoile Carouge	14	7	3	4	15	13	+2	24	Promoted
3	Luzern	14	6	5	3	16	12	+4	23	Remain in 1997–98 Nationalliga A
4	Kriens	14	6	4	4	22	16	+6	22	Promoted
5	Young Boys	14	5	5	4	19	17	+2	20	Relegated
6	Solothurn	14	3	5	6	9	17	−8	14	Remain in Nationalliga B
7	Lugano	14	2	5	7	11	17	−6	11	Relegated
8	FC Schaffhausen	14	2	5	7	13	21	−8	11	Remain in Nationalliga B

Source: rsssf.com
Rules for classification: 1) Points; 2) Goal difference; 3) Goals scored; 4) Head-to-head points; 5) Away goals scored; 6) Draw.

=== Relegation group NLB/1. Liga ===
The last eight teams of the qualification phase competed in the relegation group against relegation to the 1. Liga. The teams took half of the points (rounded up to complete units) gained in the qualification as bonus with them.

Pos	Team	Pld	W	D	L	GF	GA	GD	BP	Pts	Qualification or relegation
1	Winterthur	14	8	2	4	21	13	+8	17	43	Remain in NLB
2	Baden	14	7	4	3	28	20	+8	14	39	Remain in NLB
3	Wil	14	6	3	5	23	21	+2	14	35	Remain in NLB
4	Yverdon-Sport	14	4	4	6	17	21	−4	18	34	Remain in NLB
5	Locarno	14	4	7	3	14	14	0	14	33	Remain in NLB
6	Delémont	14	5	5	4	28	24	+4	10	30	Remain in NLB
7	Gossau	14	5	1	8	15	23	−8	8	24	Relegated to 1. Liga
8	Meyrin	14	1	6	7	13	23	−10	5	14	Relegated to 1. Liga

Source: RSSSF
Rules for classification: 1) points; 2) Position in the qualification.

== 1. Liga ==
=== Group 1 ===
Pos	Team	Pld	W	D	L	GF	GA	GD	Pts	Qualification or relegation
1	FC Renens	26	17	9	0	52	14	+38	60	Play-off to Nationalliga B
2	FC Fribourg	26	14	4	8	46	33	+13	46	Play-off to Nationalliga B
3	FC Stade Nyonnais	26	12	6	8	42	31	+11	42	
4	FC Bulle	26	11	8	7	43	43	0	41	
5	FC Martigny-Sports	26	12	3	11	55	36	+19	39	
6	FC Monthey	26	9	9	8	44	47	−3	36	
7	FC Stade Lausanne	26	8	11	7	34	29	+5	35	
8	FC Echallens	26	8	9	9	32	34	−2	33	
9	Grand-Lancy FC	26	8	8	10	34	44	−10	32	
10	Vevey Sports	26	7	10	9	44	44	0	31	
11	CS Chênois	26	8	7	11	42	43	−1	31	
12	FC Bex	26	8	6	12	36	45	−9	30	Play-out against relegation
13	FC Montreux-Sports	26	5	6	15	21	60	−39	21	Relegation to 2. Liga
14	Central Fribourg	26	4	6	16	38	60	−22	18	Relegation to 2. Liga

Source: RSSSF
Rules for classification: 1) Points; 2) Goal difference within the league, but play-off for qualifiers.

=== Group 2 ===
Pos	Team	Pld	W	D	L	GF	GA	GD	Pts	Qualification or relegation
1	FC Serrières	26	17	5	4	52	19	+33	56	Play-off to Nationalliga B
2	FC Thun	26	17	4	5	48	26	+22	55	Play-off to Nationalliga B
3	FC Biel-Bienne	26	15	8	3	53	27	+26	53	
4	FC Naters	26	14	7	5	58	30	+28	49	
5	FC Münsingen	26	13	6	7	41	25	+16	45	
6	FC Grenchen	26	10	8	8	39	29	+10	38	
7	FC Wangen bei Olten	26	8	11	7	42	35	+7	35	
8	FC Colombier	26	8	7	11	41	41	0	31	
9	FC La Chaux-de-Fonds	26	7	9	10	37	52	−15	30	
10	SV Lyss	26	7	8	11	41	45	−4	29	
11	FC Köniz	26	3	12	11	30	54	−24	21	
12	SC Bümpliz 78	26	4	8	14	28	46	−18	20	Play-out against relegation
13	FC Noiraigue	26	3	7	16	24	62	−38	16	Relegation to 2. Liga
14	FC Klus-Balsthal	26	3	6	17	23	66	−43	15	Relegation to 2. Liga

Source: RSSSF
Rules for classification: 1) Points; 2) Goal difference within the league, but play-off for qualifiers.

=== Group 3 ===
Pos	Team	Pld	W	D	L	GF	GA	GD	Pts	Qualification or relegation
1	FC Ascona	26	16	7	3	54	21	+33	55	Play-off to Nationalliga B
2	Zug 94	26	12	10	4	39	20	+19	46	Play-off to Nationalliga B
3	AC Bellinzona	26	12	9	5	39	25	+14	45	
4	FC Riehen	26	13	5	8	39	29	+10	44	
5	SC Buochs	26	10	12	4	38	22	+16	42	
6	FC Chiasso	26	12	6	8	34	20	+14	42	
7	SV Muttenz	26	11	6	9	40	35	+5	39	
8	FC Schötz	26	10	6	10	32	32	0	36	
9	FC Sursee	26	8	8	10	38	42	−4	32	
10	FC Muri	26	6	11	9	22	30	−8	29	
11	FC Hochdorf	26	7	5	14	23	46	−23	26	
12	FC Concordia Basel	26	6	7	13	27	44	−17	25	Play-out against relegation
13	FC Mendrisio	26	4	6	16	16	48	−32	18	Relegation to 2. Liga
14	FC Suhr	26	3	6	17	23	50	−27	15	Relegation to 2. Liga

Source: RSSSF
Rules for classification: 1) Points; 2) Goal difference within the league, but play-off for qualifiers.

=== Group 4 ===
Pos	Team	Pld	W	D	L	GF	GA	GD	Pts	Qualification or relegation
1	FC Tuggen	26	16	4	6	51	27	+24	52	Play-off to Nationalliga B
2	SV Schaffhausen	26	14	5	7	48	34	+14	47	Play-off to Nationalliga B
3	FC Rapperswil-Jona	26	13	7	6	58	30	+28	46	
4	FC Altstetten	26	14	4	8	44	29	+15	46	
5	FC Frauenfeld	26	11	9	6	53	35	+18	42	
6	FC Vaduz	26	11	8	7	38	31	+7	41	
7	FC Rorschach	26	11	5	10	45	41	+4	38	
8	FC Freienbach	26	9	10	7	38	42	−4	37	
9	FC Red Star Zürich	26	9	6	11	48	52	−4	33	
10	FC Bülach	26	9	5	12	37	38	−1	32	
11	SC Young Fellows Juventus	26	7	9	10	34	33	+1	30	
12	FC Dübendorf	26	5	7	14	26	52	−26	22	Play-out against relegation
13	FC Balzers	26	4	6	16	21	49	−28	18	Relegation to 2. Liga
14	FC Glarus	26	5	3	18	19	67	−48	18	Relegation to 2. Liga

Source: RSSSF
Rules for classification: 1) Points; 2) Goal difference within the league, but play-off for qualifiers.

=== Promotion play-off ===
==== Qualification round ====
Team 1	Score	Team 2
Fribourg	1–1	Serrières
Serrières	3–2	Fribourg

Serrières win 4–3 on aggregate and continue to the finals.

Team 1	Score	Team 2
Thun	2–1	FC Renens
FC Renens	0–1	Thun

Thun win 3–1 on aggregate and continue to the finals.

Team 1	Score	Team 2
Zug 94	1–4	Tuggen
Tuggen	4–0	Zug 94

Tuggen win 8–1 on aggregate and continue to the finals.

Team 1	Score	Team 2
SV Schaffhausen	1–0	FC Ascona
FC Ascona	1–2	SV Schaffhausen

SV Schaffhausen win 3–1 on aggregate and continue to the finals.

==== Final round ====
Team 1	Score	Team 2
Tuggen	1–0	Thun
Thun	2–0	Tuggen

Thun win 2–1 on aggregate and are promoted to Nationalliga B.

Team 1	Score	Team 2
Serrières	4–3	SV Schaffhausen
SV Schaffhausen	1–0	Serrières

4–4 on aggregate. SV Schaffhausen win on away goals and are promoted to Nationalliga B.

=== Relegation play-out ===
==== First round ====
Team 1	Score	Team 2
Bümpliz	2–1	Bex

Bex continue to the final.

Team 1	Score	Team 2
Concordia	2–0	FC Dübendorf

FC Dübendorf continue to the final.

==== Final round ====
Team 1	Score	Team 2
Bex	4–2	FC Dübendorf
FC Dübendorf	3–4	Bex

Bex win 8–5 on aggregate. FC Dübendorf are relegated to 2. Liga.

== Swiss Cup ==
Clubs that were playing in the European competitions were given a bye in round 4. The route of the finalists to the final:

- Round 4: Sion bye. Grenchen-Luzern 0–3
- Round 5: FC Riehen-Sion 0–2. Lugano-Luzern 0–3.
- Round 6: Sion-Grasshopper Club 2–1. Monthey-Luzern 2–3.
- Quarter-finals: Sion-St. Gallen 5–0. Étoile Carouge-Luzern 0–6.
- Semi-finals: Sion-Fribourg 5–2. Luzern-FC Schaffhausen 2–1

=== Final ===
8 June 1997
15:00

FC Sion	3 – 3 (a.e.t.)	FC Luzern
Meyrieu 1'; Gaspoz 28'; Lukić 84' (pen.)	Report	17', 68' (pen.) Wolf; 42' Kögl
Penalties
Lukić (penalty scored); Outtara (penalty scored); Zambaz (penalty scored); Gaspoz (penalty scored); Assis (penalty missed); Quentin (penalty scored)	5 – 4	(penalty scored) Wolf; (penalty scored) Wyss; (penalty scored) Moser; (penalty scored) Kögl; (penalty missed) Sermeter; (penalty missed) Sawu

Wankdorf, Bern
Attendance: 28,500
Referee: (Switzerland) Claude Détruche (Thônex)

== Swiss Clubs in Europe ==
- Grasshopper Club as 1995–96 Nationalliga A champions: 1996–97 Champions League qualifying round
- Sion as 1995–96 Swiss Cup winners: qualifying round of the 1996–97 UEFA Cup Winners' Cup
- Xamax as third placed team in the league: qualifying round of the 1996–97 UEFA Cup
- Aarau as fourth placed team: qualifying round of the 1996–97 UEFA Cup
- Luzern: 1996 UEFA Intertoto Cup
- Basel: 1996 UEFA Intertoto Cup
- Vaduz as 1995–96 Liechtenstein Cup winners: qualifying round of the 1996–97 UEFA Cup Winners' Cup

=== Grasshopper Club ===
==== Champions League ====
===== Qualifying round =====
7 August 1996 First leg	Grasshopper Club (Switzerland)	5–0	(Czech Republic) Slavia Prague	Hardturm, Zürich
20:15	Türkyilmaz 11', 46'; Esposito 43'; Moldovan 57'; Koller 89'	Report		Attendance: 9,300; Referee: Jorge Monteiro Coroado (Portugal)

21 August 1996 Second leg	Slavia Prague (Czech Republic)	0–1	(Switzerland) Grasshopper Club	Stadion Evžena Rošického, Prague
20:15		Report	Türkyilmaz 70'	Attendance: 3,012; Referee: Kim Milton Nielsen (Denmark)

Grasshopper won 6–0 on aggregate.

===== Group Stage / Group A =====
11 September 1996 Matchday 1	Grasshopper Club (Switzerland)	3–0	(Scotland) Rangers	Hardturm, Zürich
20:30	Yakin 18'; Türkyilmaz 28', 79'	Report		Attendance: 20,030; Referee: José María García-Aranda (Spain)

25 September 1996 Matchday 2	Ajax (Netherlands)	0–1	(Switzerland) Grasshopper Club	Amsterdam Arena, Amsterdam
20:30		Report	Yakin 60'	Attendance: 43,134; Referee: Günter Benkö (Austria)

16 October 1996 Matchday 3	Auxerre (France)	1–0	(Switzerland) Grasshopper Club	Stade de l'Abbé-Deschamps, Auxerre
20:30	Deniaud 43'	Report		Attendance: 17,000; Referee: Rune Pedersen (Norway)

30 October 1996 Matchday 4	Grasshopper Club (Switzerland)	3–1	(France) Auxerre	Hardturm, Zürich
20:30	Moldovan 17', 29'; Gren 59'	Report	Gren 48' (o.g.)	Attendance: 19,200; Referee: Vadim Zhuk (Belarus)

20 November 1996 Matchday 5	Rangers (Scotland)	2–1	(Switzerland) Grasshopper Club	Ibrox Stadium, Glasgow
19:30	McCoist 67', 73'	Report	Berger 77'	Attendance: 34,192; Referee: László Vágner (Hungary)

4 December 1996 Matchday 6	Grasshopper Club (Switzerland)	0–1	(Netherlands) Ajax	Hardturm, Zürich
20:30		Report	Kluivert 32'	Attendance: 19,200; Referee: Pierluigi Collina (Italy)

Table

Pos	Team	Pld	W	D	L	GF	GA	GD	Pts	Qualification	AUX	AJA	GRA	RAN
1	(France) Auxerre	6	4	0	2	8	7	+1	12	Advance to knockout stage	—	0–1	1–0	2–1
2	(Netherlands) Ajax	6	4	0	2	8	4	+4	12	Advance to knockout stage	1–2	—	0–1	4–1
3	(Switzerland) Grasshopper Club	6	3	0	3	8	5	+3	9		3–1	0–1	—	3–0
4	(Scotland) Rangers	6	1	0	5	5	13	−8	3		1–2	0–1	2–1	—

Source: UEFA

=== Sion ===
==== Cup Winners' Cup ====
===== Qualifying round =====
8 August 1996 First leg	Sion (Switzerland)	4–2	(Lithuania) Kareda Šiauliai	Stade Tourbillon, Sion
20:00	Chassot 14'; Bonvin 26'; Pančev 35' (pen.); Vercruysse 88'	Lineups	Baranauskas 73' (pen.); Dančenka 86'	Attendance: 5,200; Referee: Yevi Kollari (Albania)

22 August 1996 Second leg	Kareda Šiauliai (Lithuania)	0–0	(Switzerland) Sion	Savivaldybė Stadium, Šiauliai
17:00		Lineups		Attendance: 2,500; Referee: Lars Gerner (Denmark)

Sion won 4–2 on aggregate.

===== First round =====
12 September 1996 First leg	Sion (Switzerland)	2–0	(Ukraine) Nyva Vinnytsia	Stade Tourbillon, Sion
20:00	Colombo 50'; Bonvin 82'	Lineups		Attendance: 6,500; Referee: Andreas Georgiou (Cyprus)

26 September 1996 Second leg	Nyva Vinnytsia (Ukraine)	0–4	(Switzerland) Sion	Tsentralnyi Stadion, Vinnitsa
15:00		Lineups	Lukić 2'; Vercruysse 9', 68'; Milton 54'	Attendance: 12,000; Referee: Manfred Schüttengruber (Austria)

Sion won 6–0 on aggregate.

===== Second round =====
17 October 1996 First leg	Sion (Switzerland)	1–2	(England) Liverpool	Stade Tourbillon, Sion
20:00	Bonvin 10'	Lineups	Fowler 28'; Barnes 80'	Attendance: 16,500; Referee: Antonio López Nieto (Spain)

31 October 1996 Second leg	Liverpool (England)	6–3	(Switzerland) Sion	Anfield, Liverpool
20:45	McManaman 27'; Bjørnebye 55'; Barnes 66'; Fowler 70', 79'; Berger 89'	Lineups	Chassot 20', 65'; Bonvin 23'	Attendance: 38,514; Referee: Hartmut Strampe (Germany)

Liverpool won 8–4 on aggregate.

=== Xamax ===
==== UEFA Cup ====
===== Qualifaying round =====
6 August 1996 First leg	Anorthosis Famagusta (Cyprus)	1–2	(Switzerland) Neuchâtel Xamax	Antonis Papadopoulos Stadium, Larnaca
19:00	Stavrou 18'	Report	Vernier 29'; Leśniak 57'	Attendance: 9,400; Referee: Alan Howells (Wales)

20 August 1996 Second leg	Neuchâtel Xamax (Switzerland)	4–0	(Cyprus) Anorthosis Famagusta	Stade de la Maladière, Neuchâtel
20:00	Sandjak 10', 27'; Cyprien 17'; Vernier 37'	Report		Attendance: 12,074; Referee: Haim Lipkovich (Israel)

Neuchâtel Xamax won 6–1 on aggregate.

===== First round =====
10 September 1996 First leg	Dynamo Kyiv (Ukraine)	0–0	(Switzerland) Neuchâtel Xamax	Olimpiyskiy National Sports Complex, Kyiv
19:00		Report		Attendance: 60,000; Referee: Armand Ancion (Belgium)

24 September 1996 Second leg	Neuchâtel Xamax (Switzerland)	2–1	(Ukraine) Dynamo Kyiv	Stade de la Maladière, Neuchâtel
21:00	Leśniak 25'; Isabella 54'	Report	Maksymov 60'	Attendance: 8,600; Referee: Charles Agius (Malta)

Neuchâtel Xamax won 2–1 on aggregate.

===== Second round =====
15 October 1996 First leg	Helsingborg (Sweden)	2–0	(Switzerland) Neuchâtel Xamax	Helsingborg
	Jonson 14', 60'	Report

29 October 1996 Second leg	Neuchâtel Xamax (Switzerland)	1–1	(Sweden) Helsingborg	Xamax
	Bonalair 51' (pen.)	Report	Jonson 43'

Helsingborg won 3–1 on aggregate.

=== Aarau ===
==== UEFA Cup ====
===== Qualifaying round =====
6 August 1996 First leg	Aarau (Switzerland)	4–0	(Estonia) Lantana Tallinn	Aarau
	Georgiev 21'; Skrzypczak 55'; Pavličević 76', 86'	Report

20 August 1996 Second leg	Lantana Tallinn (Estonia)	2–0	(Switzerland) Aarau	Tallinn
	Lebret 80'; Hepner 85'	Report

Aarau won 4–2 on aggregate.

===== First round =====
10 September 1996 First leg	Brøndby (Denmark)	5–0	(Switzerland) Aarau	Brøndby
	Vilfort 21' (pen.); Bjur 56'; Møller 66', 88', 89'	Report

24 September 1996 Second leg	Aarau (Switzerland)	0–2	(Denmark) Brøndby	Prague
		Report	Møller 39'; Daugaard 90' (pen.)

Brøndby won 7–0 on aggregate.

=== Luzern ===
==== Intertoto Cup ====
===== Group 6, matches =====
22 June 1996 Matchday 1	Örgryte (Sweden)	3–0	(Switzerland) Luzern	Slottsskogsvallen, Gothenburg
	Samuelsson 4'; Allbäck 67', 71'			Attendance: 405; Referee: Robert Boggi (Italy)

30 June 1996 Matchday 2	Luzern (Switzerland)	2–0	(Israel) Hapoel Tel Aviv	Stadion Allmend, Lucerne
	Wyss 47'; Sawu 67'			Attendance: 1,088; Referee: Sergei Tatulyan (Ukraine)

7 July 1996 Matchday 3	Rennes (France)	1–2	(Switzerland) Luzern	Stade de la Route de Lorient, Rennes
	Merdy 62'		Sawu 54', 60'	Attendance: 1,969; Referee: Ladislav Gádoši (Slovakia)

20 July 1996 Matchday 5	Luzern (Switzerland)	0–1	(Croatia) Segesta	Stadion Allmend, Lucerne
			Šašivarević 81'	Attendance: 1,400; Referee: Keimpe Zuidema (Netherlands)

Table

Pos	Team	Pld	W	D	L	GF	GA	GD	Pts	Qualification
1	(Croatia) Segesta	4	3	1	0	7	3	+4	10	Advanced to semi-finals
2	(Sweden) Örgryte	4	2	2	0	8	2	+6	8	
3	(Switzerland) Luzern	4	2	0	2	4	5	−1	6	
4	(France) Rennes	4	1	1	2	5	5	0	4	
5	(Israel) Hapoel Tel Aviv	4	0	0	4	1	10	−9	0	

Source: rsssf.com

=== Basel ===
==== Intertoto Cup ====
===== Group 7, matches =====
22 June 1996 Matchday 1	Basel (Switzerland)	2 – 2	(Ukraine) Shakhtar Donetsk	St. Jakob Stadium, Basel
10:15	Zuffi 12' (1:0); H. Yakin 80' (2:2)	Summary	22' (1:1) Ostachov; (yellow card) 29' Jaksmanutski; (yellow card) 45' Pyatenko; 57' (1:2) Pyatenko	Attendance: 2,000; Referee: (Croatia) Darko Cvitkovic

29 June 1997 Matchday 2	Antalyaspor (Turkey)	2 – 5	(Switzerland) Basel	Isparta Atatürk Stadium, Isparta
17:30	Aliriza 2' (1:0); Nuri 34' (2:3); Murat (yellow card) 39'	Summary	23' (1:1) Smajić; 25' (1:2) Moser; 29' (1:3) H. Yakin; 56' (2:4) Giallanza; (yellow card) 57' Poulard; 61' (2:5) La Placa; (yellow card) 69' Frick; (yellow card) 85' Armentano	Attendance: 4,600; Referee: (Romania) Gheorghe Constantin

13 July 1996 Matchday 4	Basel (Switzerland)	5 – 0	(Belarus) Ataka-Aura Minsk	St. Jakob Stadium, Basel
20:00	Nyarko 20' (1:0); Moser 22' (2:0); La Placa 42' (3:0); Frick 53' (4:0); Armentano 67' (5:0); Salvi (yellow card) 89'	Summary	(yellow card) 50' Ermakovich	Attendance: 4,200; Referee: Vanco Kocev (Macedonia)

20 July 1996 Matchday 5	Rotor Volgograd (Russia)	3 – 2	(Switzerland) Basel	Central Stadium, Volgograd
18:00	Niederhaus 18' (1:0); Yesipov 38' (2:2); Veretennikov 57' (3:2); Yesipov (yellow card) 61'	Summary	29' (1:1) Orlando; 30' (1:2) Giallanza; (yellow card) 31' Giallanza; (yellow card) 49' Salvi	Attendance: 8,000; Referee: Branimir Babarogić (FR Yugoslavia)

Table

Pos	Team	Pld	W	D	L	GF	GA	GD	Pts	Qualification
1	(Russia) Rotor Volgograd	4	3	0	1	12	5	+7	9	Advanced to semi-finals
2	(Switzerland) Basel	4	2	1	1	14	7	+7	7	
3	(Turkey) Antalyaspor	4	2	0	2	7	7	0	6	
4	(Ukraine) Shakhtar Donetsk	4	1	1	2	5	8	−3	4	
5	(Belarus) Ataka-Aura Minsk	4	1	0	3	2	13	−11	3	

Source: rsssf.com

=== Vaduz ===
==== Cup Winners' Cup ====
===== Qualifying round =====
8 August 1996 First leg	Universitate Riga (Latvia)	1–1	(Liechtenstein) Vaduz	Latvijas Universitates Stadions, Riga
17:30	Zarins 43'	Lineups	Daumantas 40'	Attendance: 1,500; Referee: Merab Malagouradze (Georgia)

22 August 1996 Second leg	Vaduz (Liechtenstein)	1–1 (a.e.t.) (4–2 p)	(Latvia) Universitate Riga	Gemeindesportplatz, Vaduz
18:00	Polvorino 89'	Lineups	Zarins 48'	Attendance: 1,100; Referee: Krsto Danilovski (Macedonia)
	Penalties
	Müller (penalty scored); Polvorino (penalty scored); Weber (penalty scored); Heeb (penalty scored)		(penalty missed) Draguns; (penalty missed) Zarins; (penalty scored) Mastyanica; (penalty scored) Dolgopolovs

2–2 on aggregate. Vaduz won 4–2 on penalties.

===== Round 1 =====
12 September 1996 First leg	Vaduz (Liechtenstein)	0–4	(France) Paris Saint-Germain	Gemeindesportplatz, Vaduz
17:00		Lineups	Le Guen 12'; Dely Valdés 39'; Leonardo 43'; Allou 72'	Attendance: 3,900; Referee: Romans Lajuks (Latvia)

26 September 1996 Second leg	Paris Saint-Germain (France)	3–0	(Liechtenstein) Vaduz	Parc des Princes, Paris
20:45	Allou 23'; Roche 40'; Mboma 50'	Lineups		Attendance: 15,973; Referee: Bujar Pregja (Albania)

Paris Saint-Germain won 7–0 on aggregate.

== Sources ==
- Switzerland 1996–97 at RSSSF
- Switzerland Cup 1996–97 at RSSSF
- Cup finals at Fussball-Schweiz
- UEFA Intertoto Cup 1996 at RSSSF
- Josef Zindel (2018). FC Basel 1893. Die ersten 125 Jahre (in German). Basel: Friedrich Reinhardt Verlag. ISBN 978-3-7245-2305-5.

Preceded by 1995–96	Seasons in Swiss football	Succeeded by 1997–98
