= Antonio Pascale =

Italian footballer (born 1977)

Personal information
- Date of birth: 8 July 1977 (age 49)
- Position: Forward

Senior career*
Years	Team	Apps	(Gls)
1994–1996	FC Sion		
1996–1997	FC Locarno		
1997–1998	SC Kriens		
1998–1999	FC Sion		
1999–2000	FC Schaffhausen		
2000–2002	SR Delémont		
- * Club domestic league appearances and goals

Antonio Pascale (born 8 July 1977) is a retired Italian football striker.
