= David Merdy =

French footballer (born 1975)

Personal information
- Date of birth: 19 December 1975 (age 50)
- Place of birth: France
- Position: Forward

Senior career*
Years	Team	Apps	(Gls)
-1998	Stade Rennais F.C.	7	(1)
1996-1997	Troyes AC→(loan)	33	(5)
1997-1998	ASOA Valence→(loan)	24	(4)
1998-2000	Wasquehal Football	13	(0)
2000-2001	AS Béziers		
2001/2002	Kilmarnock F.C.	0	(0)
2002/2003	SO Romorantin		
2004-2007	Rodez AF		
2007-2009	Bergerac Périgord FC		
2009-2010	Espérance de Plouguerneau		
2010-2011	AF Lozère		
- Stade Olympique Millau Football
- * Club domestic league appearances and goals

David Merdy (born 19 December 1975 in France) is a French retired footballer.
