= 1997–98 in Swiss football =

Football in Switzerland
- Season: 1997–98

Men's football
- Nationalliga A: Grasshopper Club
- Nationalliga B: Lugano
- 1. Liga: Overall; Chiasso; Group 1: Stade Nyonnais; Group 2: Serrières; Group 3: Chiasso; Group 4: Red Star

Women's football
- Swiss Women's Super League: SV Seebach Zürich
- Swiss Cup: FFC Bern

The following is a summary of the 1997–98 season of competitive football in Switzerland.

== Nationalliga A ==
=== Qualification phase ===
Pos	Team	Pld	W	D	L	GF	GA	GD	Pts	Qualification
1	Grasshopper Club	22	14	4	4	59	23	+36	46	Advance to championship round halved points (rounded up) as bonus
2	Lausanne-Sport	22	12	6	4	45	27	+18	42	Advance to championship round halved points (rounded up) as bonus
3	Servette	22	11	6	5	45	33	+12	39	Advance to championship round halved points (rounded up) as bonus
4	Aarau	22	10	5	7	38	31	+7	35	Advance to championship round halved points (rounded up) as bonus
5	St. Gallen	22	7	9	6	38	34	+4	30	Advance to championship round halved points (rounded up) as bonus
6	Zürich	22	7	9	6	31	28	+3	30	Advance to championship round halved points (rounded up) as bonus
7	Sion	22	7	9	6	30	27	+3	30	Advance to championship round halved points (rounded up) as bonus
8	Luzern	22	7	8	7	26	28	−2	29	Advance to championship round halved points (rounded up) as bonus
9	Xamax	22	7	5	10	37	39	−2	26	Continue to promotion/relegation round
10	Kriens	22	5	7	10	23	41	−18	22	Continue to promotion/relegation round
11	Basel	22	5	4	13	28	46	−18	19	Continue to promotion/relegation round
12	Étoile Carouge	22	1	6	15	20	63	−43	9	Continue to promotion/relegation round

Source: rsssf.com
Rules for classification: 1) Points; 2) Goal difference; 3) Goals scored; 4) Head-to-head points; 5) Away goals scored; 6) Draw.

=== Championship round ===
Pos	Team	Pld	W	D	L	GF	GA	GD	BP	Pts	Qualification
1	Grasshopper Club (C)	14	11	1	2	39	16	+23	23	57	Qualification to Champions League first qualifying round
2	Servette	14	5	6	3	18	15	+3	20	41	Qualification to UEFA Cup second qualifying round
3	Lausanne-Sport	14	5	4	5	17	17	0	21	40	Qualification to Cup Winners' Cup qualifying round
4	Zürich	14	6	5	3	27	17	+10	15	38	Qualification to UEFA Cup second qualifying round
5	Sion	14	6	4	4	23	21	+2	15	37	Qualification to Intertoto Cup first round
6	St. Gallen	14	4	5	5	12	17	−5	15	32	Qualification to Intertoto Cup first round
7	Aarau	14	1	4	9	13	27	−14	18	25	
8	Luzern	14	1	5	8	10	29	−19	15	23	

Source: rsssf.com
Rules for classification: 1) points; 2) Position in the qualification.
(C) Champions

== Nationalliga B ==
=== Qualification phase ===
Pos	Team	Pld	W	D	L	GF	GA	GD	Pts	Qualification or relegation
1	Young Boys	22	13	3	6	48	22	+26	42	Advance to promotion/relegation NLA/LNB round
2	Lugano	22	11	7	4	44	21	+23	40	Advance to promotion/relegation NLA/LNB round
3	Baden	22	12	3	7	42	31	+11	39	Advance to promotion/relegation NLA/LNB round
4	Solothurn	22	9	10	3	31	19	+12	37	Advance to promotion/relegation NLA/LNB round
5	Delémont	22	11	3	8	47	31	+16	36	Continue to relegation round NLB/1. Liga halved points (rounded up) as bonus
6	Locarno	22	9	7	6	46	36	+10	34	Continue to relegation round NLB/1. Liga halved points (rounded up) as bonus
7	Wil	22	8	10	4	31	26	+5	34	Continue to relegation round NLB/1. Liga halved points (rounded up) as bonus
8	FC Schaffhausen	22	9	6	7	35	32	+3	33	Continue to relegation round NLB/1. Liga halved points (rounded up) as bonus
9	Yverdon-Sport	22	7	9	6	37	33	+4	30	Continue to relegation round NLB/1. Liga halved points (rounded up) as bonus
10	Winterthur	22	3	7	12	22	41	−19	16	Continue to relegation round NLB/1. Liga halved points (rounded up) as bonus
11	SV Schaffhausen	22	1	6	15	12	63	−51	9	Continue to relegation round NLB/1. Liga halved points (rounded up) as bonus
12	Thun	22	1	5	16	18	58	−40	8	Continue to relegation round NLB/1. Liga halved points (rounded up) as bonus

Source: rsssf.com
Rules for classification: 1) Points; 2) Goal difference; 3) Goals scored; 4) Head-to-head points; 5) Away goals scored; 6) Draw.

=== Promotion/relegation group NLA/NLB ===
Pos	Team	Pld	W	D	L	GF	GA	GD	Pts	Qualification
1	Xamax	14	7	5	2	35	22	+13	26	Remain in 1998–99 Nationalliga A
2	Lugano	14	6	5	3	15	12	+3	23	Promoted
3	Basel	14	6	4	4	27	22	+5	22	Remain in 1998–99 Nationalliga A
4	BSC Young Boys	14	6	4	4	20	23	−3	22	Promoted
5	Solothurn	14	6	3	5	17	15	+2	21	Remain in 1998–99 Nationalliga B
6	Kriens	14	4	4	6	19	25	−6	16	Relegated
7	Baden	14	3	3	8	15	23	−8	12	Remain in 1998–99 Nationalliga B
8	Étoile Carouge	14	3	2	9	13	19	−6	11	Relegated

Source: rsssf.com
Rules for classification: 1) Points; 2) Goal difference; 3) Goals scored; 4) Head-to-head points; 5) Away goals scored; 6) Draw.

=== Relegation group NLB/1. Liga ===
The last eight teams of the qualification phase competed in the relegation group against relegation to the 1. Liga. The teams took half of the points (rounded up to complete units) gained in the qualification as bonus with them.

Pos	Team	Pld	W	D	L	GF	GA	GD	BP	Pts	Qualification or relegation
1	Yverdon-Sport	14	9	3	2	33	14	+19	15	45	Remain in NLB
2	Delémont	14	7	5	2	34	12	+22	18	44	Remain in NLB
3	FC Schaffhausen	14	5	5	4	17	17	0	17	37	Remain in NLB
4	Wil	14	4	5	5	23	17	+6	17	34	Remain in NLB
5	Locarno	14	5	1	8	17	24	−7	17	33	Remain in NLB
6	Thun	14	8	3	3	17	12	+5	4	31	Remain in NLB
7	Winterthur	14	4	3	7	17	22	−5	8	23	Relegated to 1. Liga
8	SV Schaffhausen	14	1	1	12	11	51	−40	5	9	Relegated to 1. Liga

Source: RSSSF
Rules for classification: 1) points; 2) Position in the qualification.

== 1. Liga ==
=== Group 1 ===
Pos	Team	Pld	W	D	L	GF	GA	GD	Pts	Qualification or relegation
1	FC Stade Nyonnais	26	21	3	2	78	16	+62	66	Play-off to Nationalliga B
2	FC Meyrin	26	18	4	4	68	30	+38	58	Play-off to Nationalliga B
3	CS Chênois	26	17	5	4	68	31	+37	56	
4	FC Renens	26	14	2	10	54	42	+12	44	
5	FC Naters	26	11	6	9	39	34	+5	39	
6	FC Monthey	26	11	5	10	51	42	+9	38	
7	FC Bex	26	11	5	10	46	50	−4	38	
8	FC Martigny-Sports	26	9	8	9	41	39	+2	35	
9	Vevey Sports	26	9	5	12	39	41	−2	32	
10	FC Echallens	26	9	5	12	32	38	−6	32	
11	FC Stade Lausanne	26	7	7	12	41	55	−14	28	
12	Grand-Lancy FC	26	6	6	14	30	45	−15	24	Play-out against relegation
13	FC Gland	26	2	5	19	24	79	−55	11	Relegation to 2. Liga
14	FC Le Mont	26	2	4	20	22	91	−69	10	Relegation to 2. Liga

Source: RSSSF
Rules for classification: 1) Points; 2) Goal difference; 3) Goals scored; 4) Head-to-head points; 5) Away goals scored; 6) Draw.

=== Group 2 ===
Pos	Team	Pld	W	D	L	GF	GA	GD	Pts	Qualification or relegation
1	FC Serrières	26	16	8	2	51	23	+28	56	Play-off to Nationalliga B
2	FC Münsingen	26	15	9	2	54	20	+34	54	Play-off to Nationalliga B
3	FC Grenchen	26	16	4	6	43	21	+22	52	
4	FC Wangen bei Olten	26	11	8	7	46	43	+3	41	
5	FC Biel-Bienne	26	10	8	8	48	43	+5	38	
6	FC Fribourg	26	10	7	9	53	39	+14	37	
7	SC Bümpliz 78]	26	9	8	9	48	47	+1	35	
8	FC La Chaux-de-Fonds	26	8	7	11	37	40	−3	31	
9	FC Colombier	26	6	11	9	22	29	−7	29	
10	FC Bulle	26	6	10	10	33	32	+1	28	
11	FC Köniz	26	6	9	11	33	48	−15	27	
12	SV Lyss	26	4	10	12	35	44	−9	22	Play-out against relegation
13	FC Marly	26	5	6	15	34	69	−35	21	Relegation to 2. Liga
14	FC Alle	26	5	5	16	23	52	−29	20	Relegation to 2. Liga

Source: RSSSF
Rules for classification: 1) Points; 2) Goal difference; 3) Goals scored; 4) Head-to-head points; 5) Away goals scored; 6) Draw.

=== Group 3 ===
Pos	Team	Pld	W	D	L	GF	GA	GD	Pts	Qualification or relegation
1	FC Chiasso	26	15	6	5	38	21	+17	51	Play-off to Nationalliga B
2	SV Muttenz	26	14	7	5	49	23	+26	49	Play-off to Nationalliga B
3	FC Schötz	26	14	4	8	48	37	+11	46	
4	GC Biaschesi	26	12	8	6	41	26	+15	44	
5	SC Buochs	26	12	7	7	42	30	+12	43	
6	FC Concordia Basel	26	11	8	7	40	41	−1	41	
7	FC Ascona	26	10	7	9	33	32	+1	37	
8	AC Bellinzona	26	10	6	10	44	31	+13	36	
9	FC Riehen	26	8	8	10	38	44	−6	32	
10	FC Sursee	26	7	10	9	41	52	−11	31	
11	FC Muri	26	6	8	12	22	54	−32	26	
12	SC Dornach	26	7	4	15	35	51	−16	25	Play-out against relegation
13	FC Wohlen	26	3	10	13	28	45	−17	19	Relegation to 2. Liga
14	FC Hochdorf	26	4	5	17	22	54	−32	17	Relegation to 2. Liga

Source: RSSSF
Rules for classification: 1) Points; 2) Goal difference; 3) Goals scored; 4) Head-to-head points; 5) Away goals scored; 6) Draw.

=== Group 4 ===
Pos	Team	Pld	W	D	L	GF	GA	GD	Pts	Qualification or relegation
1	FC Red Star Zürich	26	18	1	7	48	29	+19	55	Play-off to Nationalliga B
2	FC Gossau	26	14	8	4	56	26	+30	50	Decider for play-off
3	Zug 94	26	16	2	8	62	33	+29	50	Decider winners, play-off to Nationalliga B
4	FC Tuggen	26	15	5	6	46	27	+19	50	
5	FC Frauenfeld	26	14	7	5	40	27	+13	49	
6	FC Rapperswil-Jona	26	10	7	9	43	29	+14	37	
7	SC Young Fellows Juventus	26	10	7	9	31	28	+3	37	
8	FC Altstetten	26	10	7	9	33	35	−2	37	
9	FC Vaduz	26	10	5	11	34	34	0	35	
10	FC Kreuzlingen	26	10	5	11	38	41	−3	35	
11	FC Rorschach	26	9	4	13	34	39	−5	31	
12	FC Freienbach	26	6	4	16	39	64	−25	22	Play-out against relegation
13	FC Bülach	26	4	6	16	28	57	−29	18	Relegation to 2. Liga
14	FC Schwamendingen	26	1	2	23	20	83	−63	5	Relegation to 2. Liga

Source: RSSSF
Rules for classification: 1) Points; 2) Goal difference; 3) Goals scored; 4) Head-to-head points; 5) Away goals scored; 6) Draw.

==== Decider ====
Because the teams from FC Gossau and Zug 94 ended the season level on points they had to play a league positions decider. The match was played on a neutral ground and it took place on 19 May 1998 in Allmend Brunau (Zürich).

Team 1	Score	Team 2
Zug 94	3–0	FC Gossau

Zug 94 win the decider and advance to play-offs.

=== Promotion play-offs ===
Qualification round

Team 1	Score	Team 2
Muttenz	1–1	Red Star
Red Star	1–5	Muttenz

Muttenz win 6–2 on aggregate and continue to the finals.

Team 1	Score	Team 2
Münsingen	1–0	Stade Nyonnais
Stade Nyonnais	2–0	Münsingen

Stade Nyonnais win 2–1 on aggregate and continue to the finals.

Team 1	Score	Team 2
Zug 94	0–0	Chiasso
Chiasso	2–1	Zug 94

Chiasso win 2–1 on aggregate and continue to the finals.

Team 1	Score	Team 2
FC Meyrin	2–2	Serrières
Serrières	2–2; 5–3 a.e.t.	FC Meyrin

Aggregate 4–4. Serrières win in overtime and continue to the finals.

Final round

Team 1	Score	Team 2
Stade Nyonnais	3–2	Muttenz
Muttenz	0–1	Stade Nyonnais

Stade Nyonnais win 4–2 on aggregate and are promoted to Nationalliga B.

Team 1	Score	Team 2
Serrières	0–1	Chiasso
Chiasso	3–0	Serrières

Chiasso win 4–0 on aggregate and are promoted to Nationalliga B.

=== Relegation play-out ===
First round

Team 1	Score	Team 2
Grand-Lancy	2–1	SV Lyss

SV Lyss continue to the final.

Team 1	Score	Team 2
Freienbach	4–1	Dornach

Dornach continue to the final.

Final round

Team 1	Score	Team 2
SV Lyss	4–0	Dornach
Dornach	1–3	SV Lyss

SV Lyss win 7–1 on aggregate. Dornach relegated to 2. Liga.

== Swiss Cup ==
The route of the finalists to the final:

- Round 5: Young Boys-Lausanne-Sport 1–4. Bellinzona-St. Gallen 1–3.
- Round 6: Winterthur-Lausanne-Sport 1–3. Sion-St. Gallen 1–2 a.e.t.
- Quarter-finals: Lausanne-Sport-Xamax 1–1 a.e.t., 4–1 in penalties. Thun-St. Gallen 0–5.
- Semi-finals: Wil-Lausanne-Sport 0–2. St. Gallen-Lugano 2–1.

The winners of the first drawn semi-final is considered as home team in the final.

=== Final ===
1 June 1998
15:00

Lausanne-Sport	2–2 (a.e.t.)	St. Gallen
Rehn 58'; Thurre 89'	Report	30', 48' Vurens
Penalties
Celestini (penalty scored); Londono (penalty scored); Douglas (penalty scored); Puce (penalty scored)	4 – 3	(penalty scored) Hellinga; (penalty scored) Sène; (penalty scored) Fiechter; (penalty missed) Zwyssig; (penalty missed) Bühlmann

Wankdorf, Bern
Attendance: 25,000
Referee: (Switzerland) Andreas Schluchter (Schönenbuch)

== Swiss Clubs in Europe ==
- Sion as 1996–97 Nationalliga A champions (and 1996–97 Swiss Cup winners): 1997–98 Champions League
- Luzern as finalist in the 1996–97 Swiss Cup: First round of the 1997–98 UEFA Cup Winners' Cup
- Xamax as league runners-up: 1997–98 UEFA Cup
- Grasshopper Club as third placed team: 1997–98 UEFA Cup
- Lausanne-Sport: 1997 UEFA Intertoto Cup
- Aarau: 1997 UEFA Intertoto Cup
- Balzers as 1996–97 Liechtenstein Cup winners: qualifying round of the 1997–98 UEFA Cup Winners' Cup

=== Sion ===
==== Champions League ====
===== First qualifying round =====
23 July 1997 First leg	Sion (Switzerland)	4–0	(Luxembourg) Jeunesse Esch	Stade Tourbillon, Sion
20:00	Lipawsky 5', 45'; Seoane 15'; Derivaz 61'	Report		Attendance: 7,000; Referee: Amit Klein (Israel)

30 July 1997 Second leg	Jeunesse Esch (Luxembourg)	0–1	(Switzerland) Sion	Stade de la Frontière, Esch-sur-Alzette
		Report	Zambaz 89'	Attendance: 1,600; Referee: Pavlín Jirků (Czech Republic)

Sion won 5–0 on aggregate.

===== Second qualifying round =====
13 August 1997 First leg	Sion (Switzerland)	1–4	(Turkey) Galatasaray	Sion
	Lonfat 32'	(Report)	Luiz de Sousa Milton 4'; Erdem 9'; Ilie 60'; Kaya 85'	Stadium: Stade Tourbillon; Referee: (Russia) Nikolay Levnikov

27 August 1997 Second leg	Galatasaray (Turkey)	4–1	(Switzerland) Sion	Istanbul
	Ilie 40', 52', 56'; Akyel 62'	(UEFA report)	Ouattara 70'	Stadium: Ali Sami Yen Stadı; Referee: (Netherlands) Mario Van Der Ende

Galatasaray won 8–2 on aggregate. Sion transfer to UEFA Cup

==== UEFA Cup ====
===== First round =====
16 September 1997 First leg	Sion (Switzerland)	0–1	(Russia) Spartak Moscow	Sion
19:00		Report	Kechinov 73'	Attendance: 6,000

15 October 1997 Second leg	Spartak Moscow (Russia)	5–1	(Switzerland) Sion	Moscow
17:00	Buznikin 6'; Titov 34'; Kechinov 41'; Tikhonov 60'; Romaschenko 83'	Report	Camadini 65'	Attendance: 29,000
Note: The original 2nd leg game finished 2–2 (scorers: Shirko, Alenichev – Lota 2x) on 30 September (Report), but had to be replayed because the goal posts were 8 cm short of the prescribed height.

Spartak Moscow won 6–1 on aggregate.

=== Luzern ===
==== Cup Winners' Cup ====
===== First round =====
18 September 1997 First leg	Slavia Prague (Czech Republic)	4–2	(Switzerland) Luzern	Stadion Eden, Prague
20:00	Ašanin 4'; Vácha 13'; Vágner 48'; Labant 53'	Lineups	Aleksandrov 6'; Koilov 74'	Attendance: 5,614; Referee: Fiorenzo Treossi (Italy)

2 October 1997 Second leg	Luzern (Switzerland)	0–2	(Czech Republic) Slavia Prague	Stadion Allmend, Luzern
20:00		Lineups	Koilov 55' (o.g.); Vágner 74'	Attendance: 5,614; Referee: Mikko Vuorela (Finland)

Slavia Prague won 6–2 on aggregate.

=== Xamax ===
==== UEFA Cup ====
===== First qualifying round =====
23 July 1997 First leg	Xamax (Switzerland)	7–0	(Moldova) Tiligul-Tiras Tiraspol	Stade de la Maladière (1924), Neuchâtel
20:00	Isabella 9', 16'; Kunz 15'; Sandjak 70'; Perret 72'; Rothenbühler 76'; Gigon 90'	Report		Referee: Dobrinov (Bulgaria)

30 July 1997 Second leg	Tiligul-Tiras Tiraspol (Moldova)	1–3	(Switzerland) Xamax	Tiraspol
17:00	Lukianchikov 14'	Report	Sandjak 11'; Martin 28'; Jeanneret 80'

Neuchâtel Xamax won 10–1 on aggregate.

===== Second qualifying round =====
12 August 1997 First leg	Xamax (Switzerland)	3–0	(Norway) Viking	Stade de la Maladière (1924), Neuchâtel
20:00	Sandjak 54', 81'; Fuglestad 58' (o.g.)	Report		Attendance: 6,100; Referee: Jacek Granat (Poland)

26 August 1997 Second leg	Viking (Norway)	2–1	(Switzerland) Xamax	Stavanger Stadion, Stavanger
19:00	Skogheim 54'; Mansson 85'	Report	Kunz 48'	Attendance: 1,877; Referee: Miroslav Radoman (FR Yugoslavia)

Neuchâtel Xamax won 4–2 on aggregate.

===== First round =====
16 September 1997 First leg	Internazionale (Italy)	2–0	(Switzerland) Xamax	San Siro, Milan
20:45	Ronaldo 59'; Zé Elias 71'	Report		Attendance: 30,000; Referee: Karl-Erik Nilsson (Sweden)

30 September 1997 Second leg	Xamax (Switzerland)	0–2	(Italy) Internazionale	Stade de la Maladière (1924), Neuchâtel
20:45		Report	Moriero 26'; Ganz 69'	Attendance: 15,000

Internazionale won 4–0 on aggregate.

=== Grasshopper Club ===
==== UEFA Cup ====
===== First qualifying round =====
23 July 1997 First leg	Grasshopper Club (Switzerland)	3–0	(Northern Ireland) Coleraine	Hardturm, Zürich
	H. Yakin 33'; Aspinall 36' (o.g.); Subiat 80'	Report		Referee: Bazzoli (Italy)

30 July 1997 Second leg	Coleraine (Northern Ireland)	1–7	(Switzerland) Grasshopper Club	Coleraine
20:30	O'Dowd 22'	Report	Magnin 15'; Esposito 27'; Ahinful 33'; Shiels 51' (o.g.); Tikva 63'; H. Yakin 64'; Aspinall 83' (o.g.)

Grasshoppers won 10–1 on aggregate.

===== Second qualifying round =====
12 August 1997 First leg	Grasshopper Club (Switzerland)	3–0	(Norway) Brann	Hardturm, Zürich
19:30	Magnin 50'; Türkyilmaz 65'; Thüler 83'	Report

26 August 1997 Second leg	Brann (Norway)	2–0	(Switzerland) Grasshopper Club	Bergen
	Paldan 41', 44'	Report

Grasshoppers won 3–2 on aggregate.

===== First round =====
16 September 1997 First leg	Croatia Zagreb	4–4	(Switzerland) Grasshopper Club	Stadion Maksimir, Zagreb
20:15	Šarić 23'; Viduka 41'; Prosinečki 58' (pen.); Cvitanović 78'	Report	Moldovan 20', 79'; Esposito 62'; Türkyilmaz 65'	Attendance: 35,000

30 September 1997 Second leg	Grasshopper Club (Switzerland)	0–5	Croatia Zagreb	Hardturm, Zürich
20:00		Report	Cvitanović 25', 32', 89'; Prosinečki 86' (pen.), 90' (pen.)	Attendance: 16,000

Croatia Zagreb won 9–4 on aggregate.

=== Lausanne-Sport ===
==== Intertoto Cup ====
===== Group 3 =====
22 June 1997 Matchday 1	Lausanne Sports (Switzerland)	4–1	(Cyprus) Nea Salamis Famagusta	Stade Olympique de la Pontaise, Lausanne
	Iglesias 20'; Hänzi 56'; N'Kufo 59', 81'		Mihić 90'	Attendance: 800; Referee: Grujica Tomić (Croatia)

28 June 1997 Matchday 2	Auxerre (France)	1–1	(Switzerland) Lausanne Sports	Stade Abbé-Deschamps, Auxerre
	Guivarc'h 38'		Ohrel 45' (pen.)	Attendance: 3,917; Referee: Emanuel Zammit (Malta)

13 July 1997 Matchday 4	Lausanne Sports (Switzerland)	6–0	(Northern Ireland) Ards	Stade Olympique de la Pontaise, Lausanne
	Hänzi 28', 38'; Iglesias 52'; Carrasco 72'; Celestini 76' (pen.); Douglas 79' (pen.)			Attendance: 1,070; Referee: Vladimir Antonov (Moldova)

20 July 1997 Matchday 5	Royal Antwerp (Belgium)	2–2	(Switzerland) Lausanne Sports	Bosuilstadion, Antwerp
	da Silva 58'; Kiekens 73' (pen.)		Douglas 39'; Thurre 62'	Attendance: 2,000; Referee: Igor Horozhankin (Ukraine)

Pos	Team	Pld	W	D	L	GF	GA	GD	Pts	Qualification
1	(France) Auxerre	4	3	1	0	19	2	+17	10	Advanced to semi-finals
2	(Switzerland) Lausanne Sports	4	2	2	0	13	4	+9	8	
3	(Belgium) Royal Antwerp	4	2	1	1	7	7	0	7	
4	(Cyprus) Nea Salamis Famagusta	4	1	0	3	6	19	−13	3	
5	(Northern Ireland) Ards	4	0	0	4	1	14	−13	0	

Source: rsssf.com

=== Aarau ===
==== Intertoto Cup ====
===== Group 4 =====
22 June 1997 Matchday 1	Standard Liège (Belgium)	0–0	(Switzerland) Aarau	Stade Maurice Dufrasne, Liège
				Attendance: 2,412; Referee: Livio Bazzoli (Italy)

29 June 1997 Matchday 2	Aarau (Switzerland)	0–1	(Israel) Maccabi Petah Tikva	Stadion Brügglifeld, Aarau
			Biala 74'	Attendance: 1,400; Referee: Marcel Lică (Romania)

6 July 1997 Matchday 3	Köln (Germany)	3–0	(Switzerland) Aarau	Südstadion, Cologne
	Vlădoiu 22', 29', 84'			Attendance: 11,000; Referee: Milan Mitrović (Slovenia)

19 July 1997 Matchday 5	Aarau (Switzerland)	0–0	(Republic of Ireland) Cork City	Stadion Brügglifeld, Aarau
				Attendance: 700; Referee: Željko Širić (Croatia)

Pos	Team	Pld	W	D	L	GF	GA	GD	Pts	Qualification
1	(Germany) Köln	4	3	1	0	9	2	+7	10	Advanced to semi-finals
2	(Israel) Maccabi Petah Tikva	4	1	2	1	2	3	−1	5	
3	(Belgium) Standard Liège	4	0	4	0	1	1	0	4	
4	(Republic of Ireland) Cork City	4	0	3	1	0	2	−2	3	
5	(Switzerland) Aarau	4	0	2	2	0	4	−4	2	

Source: rsssf.com

=== Balzers ===
==== Cup Winners' Cup ====
===== Qualifying round =====
14 August 1997 First leg	Balzers (Liechtenstein)	1–3	(Hungary) BVSC Budapest	Sportplatz Rheinau, Balzers
18:00	Wörnhard 38'	Lineups	Telser 50' (o.g.); Füzi 76'; Csordás 84'	Attendance: 660; Referee: Ante Kulušić (Croatia)

28 August 1997 Second leg	BVSC Budapest (Hungary)	2–0	(Liechtenstein) Balzers	Szőnyi úti Stadion, Budapest
19:00	Komlósi 12'; Bükszegi 90'	Lineups		Attendance: 1,500; Referee: Richard O'Hanlon (Republic of Ireland)

BVSC won 5–1 on aggregate.

== Sources ==
- Switzerland 1997–98 at RSSSF
- Switzerland Cup 1997–98 at RSSSF
- Cup finals at Fussball-Schweiz
- UEFA Intertoto Cup 1997 at RSSSF
- Josef Zindel (2018). FC Basel 1893. Die ersten 125 Jahre (in German). Basel: Friedrich Reinhardt Verlag. ISBN 978-3-7245-2305-5.

Preceded by 1996–97	Seasons in Swiss football	Succeeded by 1998–99
