= Alari Lell =

Estonian footballer

Personal information
- Full name: Alari Lell
- Date of birth: 10 June 1976 (age 50)
- Place of birth: Tallinn, Estonia
- Height: 1.93 m (6 ft 4 in)
- Position: Defender

Senior career*
Years	Team	Apps	(Gls)
1993–1994	Norma Tallinn	1	(0)
1994–2000	FC Flora	14	(0)
1995–1998	→ Lelle SK (Note: Lelle SK were known as Pärnu Tervis during the 1995–96 season) (loan)	42	(2)
1998–1999	→ Viljandi Tulevik (loan)	37	(0)
2000	→ FC Kuressaare (loan)	27	(2)
2001	HÜJK Emmaste	18	(3)
2002–2003	FC Kuressaare	30	(0)
2004	Kärdla Hiiu Kalur	20	(6)
2005	Concordia Audentes	13	(3)
2006	Tallinna Kalev	10	(2)
2007–2008	Nõmme United	10	(1)
2009–2013	Lilleküla JK Retro (Note: Known as Eesti Koondis until 2012.)	57	(17)
Total		279	(36)

International career
1995	Estonia	6	(0)
- * Club domestic league appearances and goals

Alari Lell (born 10 June 1976) is an Estonian former footballer who played as a defender. He played for several clubs in his native country, including FC Flora Tallinn, JK Tervis Pärnu, JK Viljandi Tulevik and FC Kuressaare.

== Club career ==
He was released by Flora ahead of the 2001 season.

== International career ==
Lell earned his first official cap for the Estonia national football team on 25 March 1995, when Estonia played Italy in a qualifier for Euro 1996. He obtained a total number of six caps.
